= Mark Weissman =

American politician (1949–2026)

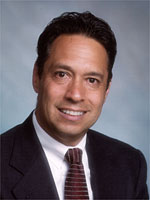
- Weissman in 2000

Member of the Florida House of Representatives from the 90th District
- In office November 7, 2000 – November 5, 2002
- Preceded by: John Rayson
- Succeeded by: Irving Slosberg

Personal details
- Born: February 24, 1949 New York City, U.S.
- Died: April 2026 (aged 77)
- Party: Democratic
- Children: Gabrielle, Alexandra, Samuel, Andrea
- Education: Miami-Dade Community College (A.A.); Nova University (B.S.)
- Occupation: Funeral home director

Mark Weissman (February 24, 1949 – April 2026) was an American Democratic politician and funeral home director who served as a member of the Florida House of Representatives from the 90th District from 2000 to 2002.

== Early life and career ==
Weissman was born in the Bronx in New York City. He moved to Florida in 1971 and attended Miami-Dade Community College, receiving his associate degree in 1971. He later attended Nova University, graduating with his bachelor's degree in 1986. He owned and operated several cemeteries for several decades, which he sold to Service Corporation International.

In 1996, Weissman ran for the Parkland City Commission from District 4 in a special election following the resignation of the previous commissioner. He ran against civic activist Mary Wing Soares, production worker Tom Timmons, and businessman Jeffrey Kolodney, and won the election by a wide margin, receiving 51 percent of the vote. He was re-elected unopposed in 1998.

== Florida House of Representatives ==
In 2000, Democratic State Representative John Rayson was term-limited and unable to seek re-election to another term. Weissman ran to succeed him in the 90th district, which was based in northern Broward County. He faced Keiser College Vice President Belinda Keiser in the Democratic primary, which was open to all voters because no other candidates filed. Weissman narrowly defeated Keiser, winning 52 percent of the vote to her 48 percent.

Weissman declined to seek re-election in 2002 after he was drawn into the same district as fellow Democratic State Representative Nan Rich, and instead planned to run for a seat in 2004.

In 2004, when State Representative Stacy Ritter was term limited, Weissman ran to succeed her in the 96th district, which included Coral Springs and Tamarac. He faced attorney and political activist Ari Porth in the Democratic primary. Porth defeated Weissman by a wide margin, winning 55 percent of the vote to Weissman's 45 percent.

== Death ==
Weissman died in April 2026, at the age of 77.
