= 2018 Florida House of Representatives election =

- November 6, 2018

All 120 seats in the Florida House of Representatives 61 seats needed for a majority
- Turnout: 45.39% ▲1.86 pp
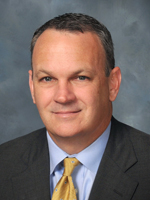

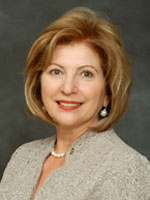
	Majority party	Minority party
Leader	Richard Corcoran	Janet Cruz
Party	Republican	Democratic
Leader since	November 22, 2016	November 21, 2016
Leader's seat	37th–Dade City	62nd–Tampa
Last election	79 seats, 57.08%	41 seats, 39.77%
Seats before	78	42
Seats won	73	47
Seat change	▼5	▲5
Popular vote	3,320,015	2,494,934
Percentage	56.21%	42.24%
- Results: Republican gain Democratic gain Republican hold Democratic hold
Speaker before election
Richard Corcoran
Republican
Elected Speaker
José R. Oliva
Republican

The 2018 Florida House of Representatives election was held in the U.S. state of Florida on November 6, 2018, to elect members to the House of Representatives. The election coincided with the election for governor, and other elections. The Republicans won 73 seats and losing only two, maintaining their control since 1997, while the Democrats gained six seats. Four vacant seats, all won by Republicans in 2016, were picked up by Democrats.

== Results ==
Party	Votes		Seats		
Party	No.	%	No.	+/−	%
Republican Party of Florida	3,320,015	56.21	73	−2	60.83
Florida Democratic Party	2,494,934	42.24	47	+6	39.16
Independent	81,720	1.38	0	0	0.00
Libertarian Party of Florida	5,381	0.32	0	0	0.00
Green Party of Florida	4,622	0.32	0	0	0.00
Write-in	3,925	0.15	0	0	0.00
Total	5,906,926	100.00	120	±0	100.00
Registered voters (as of August 2018)	13,013,657	100.00			
Turnout	5,906,926	45.39			
Source: Florida Division of Elections, CBS Miami

Popular vote
Republican	56.21%
Democratic	42.24%
Other	0.83%

House seats
Republican	60.83%
Democratic	39.16%

=== Closest races ===
Seats where the margin of victory was under 10%:

1. District 89, 0.0%
2. District 26, 0.1% gain
3. District 105, 0.9%
4. District 115, 0.9%
5. District 72, 1.5%
6. District 15, 1.9%
7. District 29, 2%
8. District 118, 2.3% gain
9. District 28, 2.5%
10. District 44, 2.6%
11. District 21, 2.9%
12. District 84, 2.9%
13. District 59, 3%
14. District 83, 4.2%
15. District 60, 4.6%
16. District 69, 5.4% gain
17. District 30, 5.9%
18. District 114, 5.9%
19. District 120, 6.2%
20. District 103, 6.5% gain
21. District 63, 6.9% gain
22. District 64, 7%
23. District 93, 7.1%
24. District 67, 7.9%
25. District 42, 8.9%
26. District 58, 9%
27. District 85, 9.2%

== Predictions ==
Source	Ranking	As of
Governing	Likely R	October 8, 2018

== Retiring incumbents ==
=== Republicans ===
- Clay Ingram, District 1 (term-limited)
- Frank White, District 2 (retiring, ran for Fl Att gen)
- Elizabeth W. Porter, District 10 (term-limited)
- Jay Fant, District 15 (retiring, ran for FL Att Gen)
- Jason Brodeur, District 28 (term-limited)
- Jay Metz, District 32 (term-limited, appointed to 5th judicial circuit court)
- Don Hahnfeldt, District 33 (deceased)
- Richard Corcoran, District 37 (term-limited)
- Mike Miller, District 47 (retiring, ran for CD-7)
- Tom Goodson, District 51 (term-limited)
- Ben Albritton, District 56 (term-limited ran for SD-26)
- Jake Rayburn, District 57 (retiring)
- Ross Spano, District 59 (retiring, ran for CD-15)
- Larry Alhern, District 66 (term-limited, ran for Pinellas Co. Commission district 6)
- Kathleen Peters, District 69 (retiring, ran for Pinellas Co. commission District 6)
- Jim Boyd, District 71 (term-limited)
- Joe Gruters, District 73 (retiring, ran for SD-23)
- Julio Gonzalez, District 74 (retiring, ran for CD-17)
- Matt Caldwell, District 79 (term-limited, ran for agricultural commissioner)
- Gayle Harrell, District 83 (term-limited, ran for SD-25)
- Bill Hager, District 89 (term-limited)
- George Moraitis, District 93 (term-limited)
- Manny Díaz Jr., District 103 (retiring, ran for SD-36)
- Carlos Trujillo, District 105 (term-limited, appointed U.S. Ambassador to the OAS)
- Michael Bileca, District 115 (term-limited)
- Jeanette Nuñez, District 119 (term-limited, ran for lt. gov of FL)

=== Democrats ===
- Sean Shaw, District 61 (retiring, ran for FL att. gen.)
- Janet Cruz, District 62 (term-limited, ran for SD 18)
- Joseph Abruzzo, District 81 (retiring)
- Larry Lee Jr., District 84 (retiring)
- Lori Berman, District 90 (retiring, ran for SD 31 special election)
- Barrington Russell, District 95 (retiring)
- Katie Edwards-Walpole, District 98 (retiring)
- Cynthia Stafford, District 100 (term-limited)
- David Richardson, District 113 (retiring, ran for CD-27)
