= Anne Mackenzie (politician) =

American politician

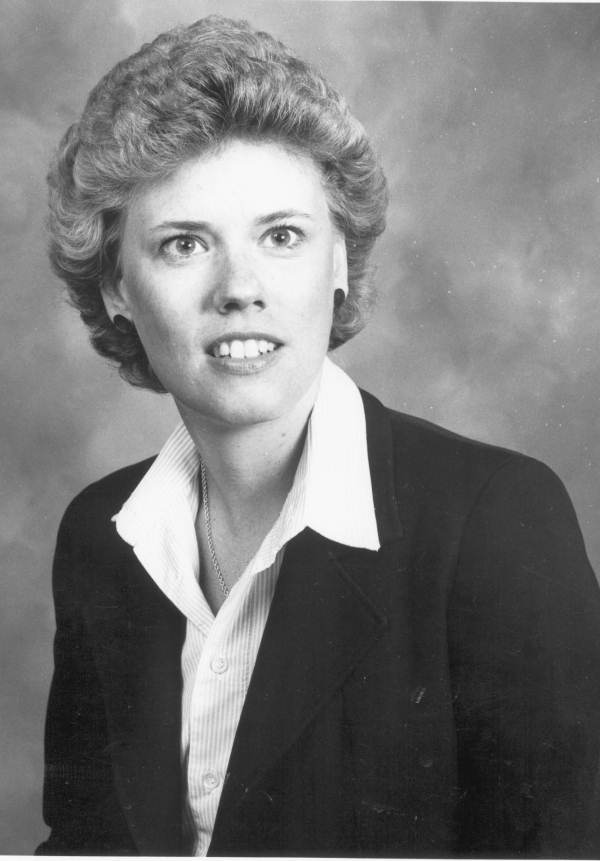
- Mackenzie in 1982

Member of the Florida House of Representatives from the 95th district
- In office 1982–1998

Personal details
- Born: 1946 or 1947 (age 78–79) Eau Claire, Wisconsin
- Education: Ripon College

Anne Mackenzie (born 1946/1947) is an American former politician in the state of Florida. She was a member of the Florida House of Representatives for the Democratic Party from the 95th district between 1982 and 1998.

== Early life ==
Mackenzie grew up in Eau Claire, Wisconsin. She attended Ripon College in Ripon, Wisconsin, graduating in 1972. While attending the college, she was president of Alpha Xi Delta, secretary of the student senate, co-editor of The Crimson and co-host of a WRPN radio show. She worked as a legislative aide to representative Linda Cox for six years and as member of the Broward County Zoning Advisory Board for two years. In the 1978 general election, she lost a contest for election to the Florida State Senate to Ken Jenne.

== Political career ==
Mackenzie was first elected to the Florida House of Representatives in the 1982 general election to represent Fort Lauderdale. She was a strong supporter of social and women's issues, including the Equal Rights Amendment, as well as public education funding. Mackenzie served as the inaugural director of the Florida Legislative Center and Museum, working with John Phelps to grow the center. She was vice-chair of a Joint House-Senate Committee on Information Technology Resources.

She was appointed as the majority leader by T. K. Wetherell on April 15, 1991, replacing Fred Lippman who had been accused of sexual harassment. Mackenzie was the majority leader in the legislature, at the same time as Tom Gustafson served as the speaker of the house and Lippman served as rules chairman, all three being from Broward County. She was the first woman to hold this position and the longest-serving. She was also chair of the finance and taxation committee and the rules and calendar committee, the first woman to hold both positions, and chair of the appropriations, transport and economic development committee.

In January 1998, the Florida Democrats voted Mackenzie in as the party leader to replace Willie Logan, who they felt was not a strong enough leader. Logan would have been the first Black speaker of the house if the party had retaken the majority in the 1998 general election and the move opened a racial divide within the party. Mackenzie announced in July 1998 that she would not run for re-election as she was concerned that she had not been able to unify the Democrats. In August, after her announcement, the dispute culminated in Vice President Al Gore flying to Florida to mediate the party's issues.

== Personal life ==
Mackenzie is married to her husband, Walter Law. She was a member of the board and chair of the Council on Culture and Arts, executive director of the Fort Lauderdale Downtown Council, and a member of the Healthy Start Coalition. She received the Allen Morris Award for Most Effective in Committee 1988-1990 and was inducted in the Broward County Women's Hall of Fame.
