= Anika Omphroy =

American politician from Florida

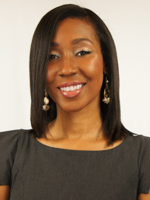

Member of the Florida House of Representatives from the 95th district
- In office November 6, 2018 – November 8, 2022
- Preceded by: Barrington Russell
- Succeeded by: Christine Hunschofsky

Personal details
- Pronunciation: A-nih-kuh TEH-ne OMF-roy
- Born: July 25 Brooklyn, New York, U.S.
- Party: Democratic
- Relations: Hazelle P. Rogers maternal aunt
- Education: Nova Southeastern University (BS)
- Committees: Agriculture & Natural Resources Appropriations Subcommittee - Democratic Ranking Member 12/28/2020 - 11/8/2022; Appropriations Committee 12/18/2020 - 11/8/2022; Commerce Committee 12/18/2020 - 11/8/2022; Regulatory Reform Subcommittee 12/18/2020 - 11/8/2022; Redistricting Committee 9/3/2021 - 11/8/2022; Select Committee on Gaming 5/14/2021 - 5/22/2021; Environment, Agriculture & Flooding Subcommittee 12/18/2020 - 11/8/2022; Secondary Education & Career Development Subcommittee 12/18/2020 - 11/8/2022; Civil Justice Subcommittee - Democratic Ranking Member 12/14/2018 - 11/3/2020; Agriculture & Natural Resources Appropriations Subcommittee 12/14/2018 - 11/3/2020; Agriculture & Natural Resources Subcommittee 12/14/2018 - 11/3/2020; Civil Justice Subcommittee 8/30/2019 - 9/9/2019; Health Market Reform Subcommittee 12/14/2018 - 11/3/2020
- Website: Official website

Anika Tene Omphroy is an American politician who served as a member of the Florida House of Representatives from 2018 to 2022. Omphroy represented the State's 95th House District, which includes part of Broward County. She is a member of the Democratic Party.

== Florida House of Representatives ==
Omphroy became State Representative-Elect on Qualifying day when incumbent state Representative Barrington Russell, Sr. failed to qualify at noon on June 22, 2018. Omphroy became the youngest State Representative to serve House District 95.

Omphroy ran for office in 2016. She had never held elected office before. She faced the Mayor of Lauderdale Lakes, Barrington Russell, in the Florida House District 95 open-seat election. Despite finishing third, Omphroy was within three percentage points of Russel and Robert Lynch. The Sun Sentinel Editorial Board endorsed her in that race, stating that "Omphroy is a business consultant who exudes energy and passion for helping people and businesses do better."
