= Jared Moskowitz =

American politician (born 1980)

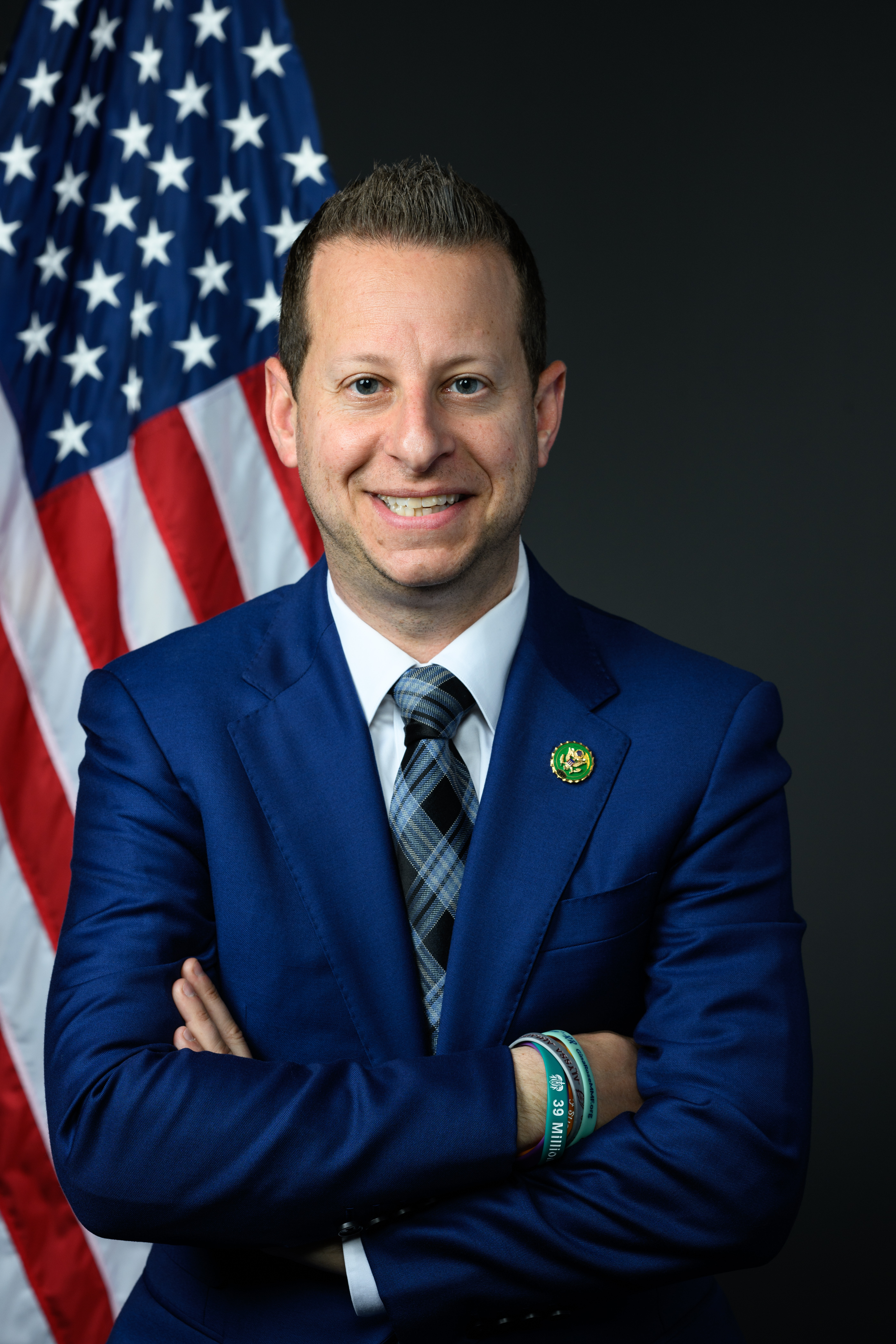
- Official portrait, 2023

Member of the U.S. House of Representatives from Florida's 23rd district
- Incumbent
- Assumed office January 3, 2023
- Preceded by: Ted Deutch

Member of the Broward County Commission from the 8th district
- In office January 12, 2022 – November 29, 2022
- Appointed by: Ron DeSantis
- Preceded by: Barbara Sharief
- Succeeded by: Robert McKinzie

Director of the Florida Division of Emergency Management
- In office January 15, 2019 – April 30, 2021
- Governor: Ron DeSantis
- Preceded by: Wes Maul
- Succeeded by: Kevin Guthrie

Member of the Florida House of Representatives from the 97th district
- In office November 6, 2012 – January 11, 2019
- Preceded by: Marty Kiar
- Succeeded by: Dan Daley

Member of the Parkland City Commission from the 2nd district
- In office 2006–2012
- Preceded by: Debby Beck
- Succeeded by: Christine Hunschofsky

Personal details
- Born: Jared Evan Moskowitz; December 18, 1980 (age 45) Coral Springs, Florida, U.S.
- Party: Democratic
- Spouse: Leah Rifkin
- Children: 2
- Education: George Washington University (BA); Nova Southeastern University (JD)
- Website: House website Campaign website

Jared Evan Moskowitz (/ˈmɒskəwɪts/ MOSS-kə-wits; born December 18, 1980) is an American politician and attorney serving as the U.S. representative for Florida's 23rd congressional district since 2023. A member of the Democratic Party, he previously served on the Broward County Commission from 2022 to 2023 and as Director of the Florida Division of Emergency Management from 2019 to 2021. Moskowitz also represented the 97th district in the Florida House of Representatives from 2012 to 2019 and was a city commissioner for Parkland, Florida from 2006 to 2012.

Born and raised in Broward County, Moskowitz graduated from George Washington University in 2003 and earned a Juris Doctor from the Shepard Broad College of Law in 2007. While attending law school, he was elected to the Parkland City Commission at the age 25 in 2006. Re-elected in 2010, Moskowitz resigned from the city commission to successfully run for the Florida Legislature in 2012. During his final term in the Florida House, Moskowitz was appointed by Governor Ron DeSantis as the director of the Florida Division of Emergency Management in 2019. Following his resignation in 2021, DeSantis appointed Moskowitz to the Broward County Commission, where he served for ten months before his election to the U.S. Congress in 2022.

While serving in Congress, Moskowitz has been described as a centrist and moderate Democrat. In 2026, The New York Times referred to him as "one of the most vocal supporters of Israel in the House."

== Early life and education ==
Moskowitz was born on December 18, 1980, in Coral Springs, Florida. His father, Michael, was an attorney, philanthropist, and prominent Democratic fundraiser. Moskowitz graduated from Marjory Stoneman Douglas High School in Parkland, Florida. He earned a Bachelor of Arts in political science from George Washington University in 2003 and a Juris Doctor from the Shepard Broad Law Center at Nova Southeastern University in 2007. He was admitted to the Florida Bar in 2008.

== Early political career ==
Moskowitz began his political career as an intern for Vice President Al Gore and later worked as an assistant on Joe Lieberman's 2004 presidential campaign. In 2008, he was a Florida delegate pledged to Barack Obama at the Democratic National Convention.

While attending law school, Moskowitz was elected to the Parkland City Commission for District 2 in 2006, and was reelected in 2010. In March 2006, he defeated incumbent Debby Beck. As a city commissioner, Moskowitz supported efforts to make the city more eco-friendly by providing subsidies to households that purchased low-flow toilets and showerheads, energy-efficient air conditioners, and hybrid cars. He resigned in 2012 to run for the state legislature. He was succeeded on the city commission by Christine Hunschofsky.

After law school, Moskowitz worked as the director of government relations and general counsel for AshBritt Environmental, a disaster recovery and environmental services company.

=== Florida House of Representatives ===
Following the 2012 redistricting, Moskowitz ran for the newly drawn 97th house district, which consisted of northern Broward County. He won the Democratic primary unopposed and advanced to the general election, where he faced Republican nominee James Gleason, a business owner who had been an unsuccessful candidate for mayor of Coral Springs. The Sun-Sentinel praised both candidates as "good choices for an open seat" but endorsed Moskowitz, declaring that his "good grasp of statewide and local issues" made him the better candidate. He defeated Gleason with 69% of the vote.

During his first term in the legislature, Moskowitz sponsored a memorial for Robert Levinson, who has been held as a hostage in Iran since 2007, calling on "Congress, the Obama administration and the Secretary of State's office to work to get Levinson home." Moskowitz's proposed memorial passed both houses of the legislature and was signed by Governor Rick Scott.

In 2014 and 2016, Moskowitz was reelected to the legislature without opposition.

In 2018, after the shooting at Marjory Stoneman Douglas High School, Moskowitz helped draft the bipartisan Marjory Stoneman Douglas High School Safety Act, a bill to tighten gun control, school security, and school safety.

=== Division of Emergency Management ===
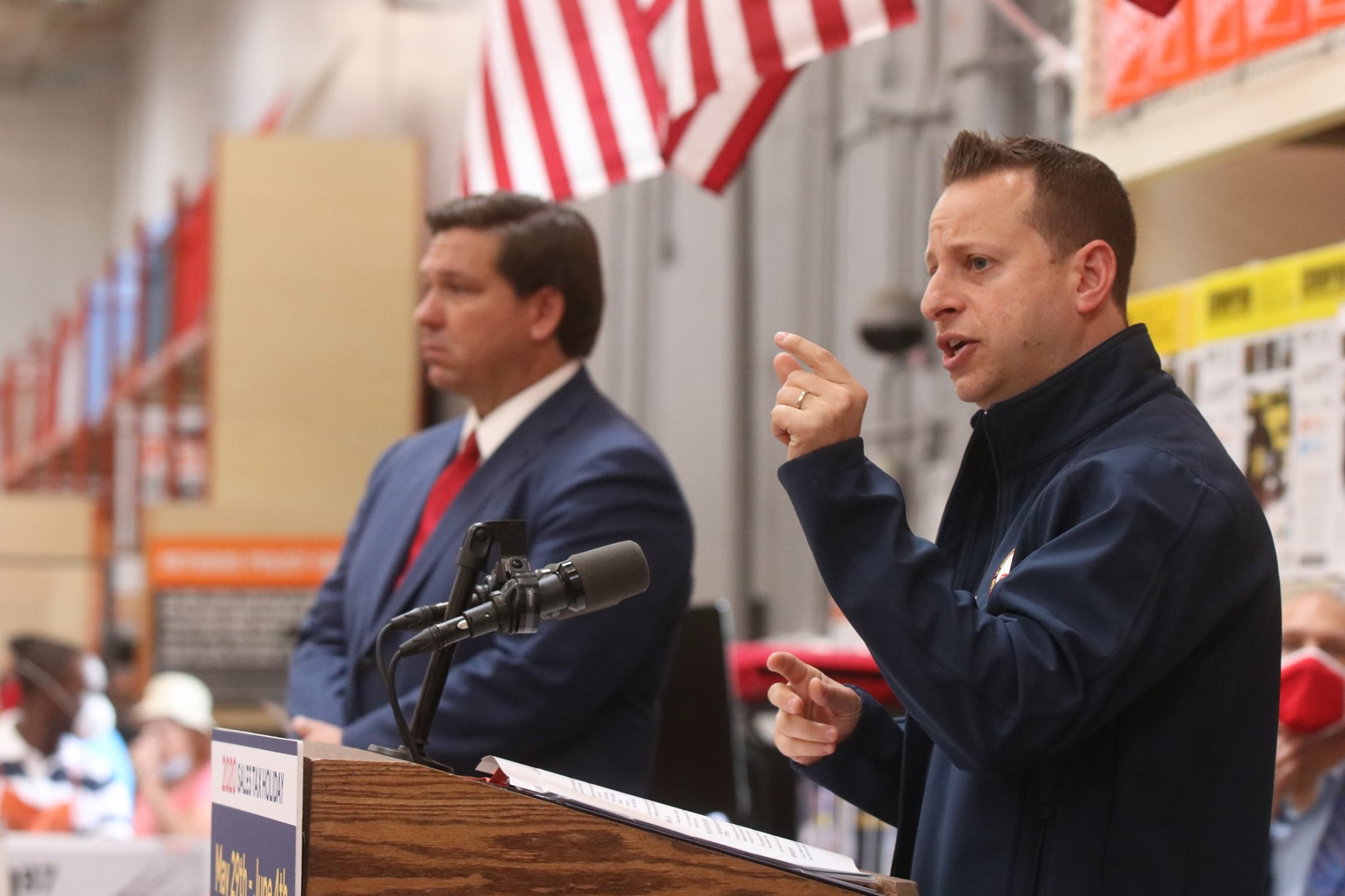
Moskowitz with Governor Ron DeSantis announcing the establishment of COVID-19 testing sites in Florida, 2020

In December 2018, Governor-elect Ron DeSantis appointed Moskowitz as director of the Florida Division of Emergency Management. He took office the next month as the state was recovering from Hurricane Michael, a Category 5 storm. As director, he managed Florida's response to multiple crises, including two hurricane seasons and the COVID-19 pandemic. During the pandemic, he oversaw the distribution of personal protective equipment (PPE), vaccines, and testing supplies.

In 2020, at the beginning of the COVID-19 pandemic, Moskowitz criticized 3M for diverting millions of N95 masks intended for Florida to foreign buyers offering higher prices. He described his unsuccessful efforts to secure masks, with distributors directing state officials to empty warehouses. According to Moskowitz, 3M's U.S. distributors acknowledged that Florida's orders were delayed in favor of more profitable foreign sales, including to Germany, Russia, and France.

Moskowitz also criticized 60 Minutes for running a story that claimed that Governor Ron DeSantis engaged in a pay-to-play scheme with supermarket chain Publix over distribution of the COVID-19 vaccine, writing that "[n]o one" from DeSantis's "office suggested Publix" to distribute the vaccines.

In April 2021, Moskowitz left the Division of Emergency Management to spend more time with his family. Governor Ron DeSantis credited Moskowitz with Florida's logistics response to hurricanes and the pandemic. Later that year, in August, Miami-Dade County mayor Daniella Levine Cava appointed him as an advisor for the county's COVID-19 response.

=== Broward County Commission ===
In November 2021, DeSantis appointed Moskowitz to the Broward County Commission. In March 2022, he announced that he would be a candidate for the United States House of Representatives. He continued to serve on the commission during 2022, and served until his successor was sworn in on November 29.

== U.S. House of Representatives ==
=== Elections ===
==== 2022 ====
Florida's 23rd district

In 2022, following Representative Ted Deutch's announcement that he would not be running for re-election, Moskowitz declared his candidacy for Florida's 23rd congressional district. He secured the Democratic nomination in the August primary with 61.1% of the vote, defeating a range of challengers including Ben Sorensen who received 20.5%.

In the November general election, Moskowitz faced Republican nominee Joe Budd. Moskowitz won with 51.6% of the vote, while Budd received 46.8%. Independent candidates Christine Scott and Mark Napier received 1.1% and 0.5%, respectively.

==== 2024 ====
In 2024, Moskowitz was re-elected to a second term. He faced Republican Joe Kaufman and won 52.5% to 47.5% of the vote. Following his reelection, Moskowitz was informed of a potential assassination plot against him. A suspect was arrested near his home with a rifle and a manifesto containing antisemitic views.

==== 2026 ====
Following redistricting, Moskowitz is running for reelection in the 25th district. He faced a primary challenge from activist and union organizer Oliver Larkin, who is a member of the Democratic Socialists of America. Moskowitz defeated Larkin in the Democratic primary, receiving 63.5% of the vote.

=== Tenure ===
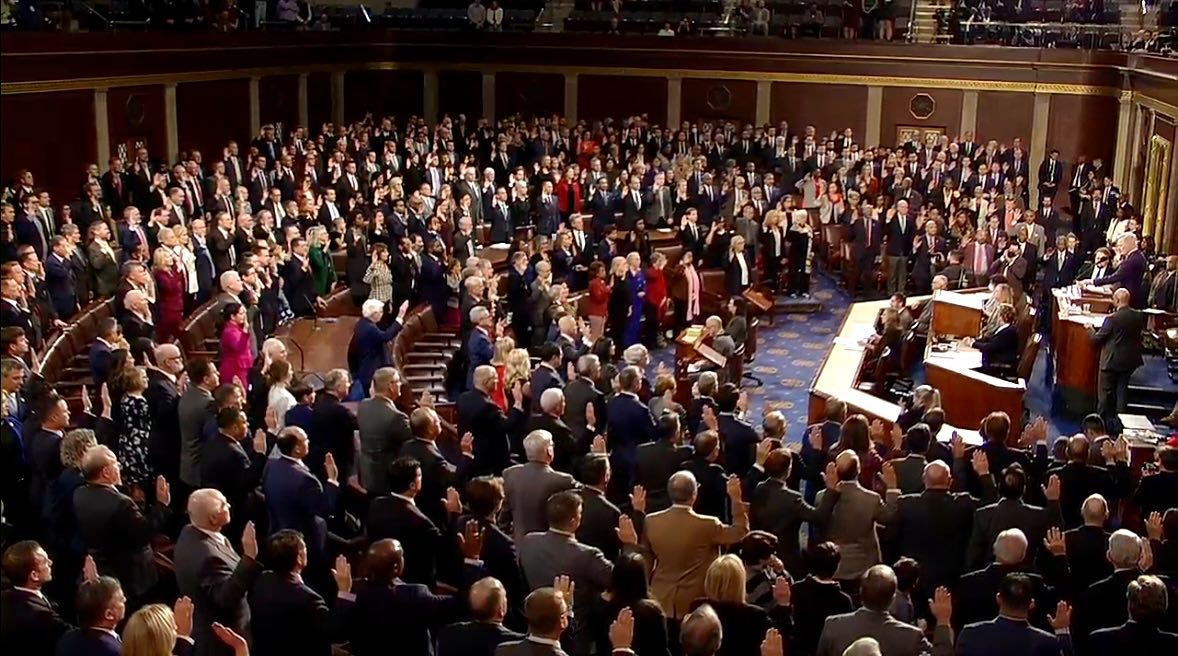
Moskowitz being sworn in with the 118th Congress, 2023

Moskowitz was sworn into office on January 7, 2023, as the U.S. representative for Florida's 23rd congressional district. During the 118th Congress, he served on the Foreign Affairs and Oversight and Accountability committees. In February, Moskowitz and Republican Representative Mario Díaz-Balart reintroduced the EAGLES Act, a bipartisan bill aimed at expanding the U.S. Secret Service National Threat Assessment Center to improve research, training, and threat assessment programs for preventing targeted school violence.

In 2024, Moskowitz was named one of six Democrats on a bipartisan task force investigating the attempted assassination of Donald Trump.

On March 6, 2025, Moskowitz was one of ten Democrats in Congress who joined all of their Republican colleagues in voting to censure Democratic congressman Al Green for interrupting President Donald Trump's speech to Congress.

On March 10, 2023, an account held in trust for Moskowitz's young children sold between $65,000 and $150,000 worth of Seacoast Banking shares the same day Silicon Valley Bank failed. Moskowitz had attended a private congressional briefing on the banking crisis the same day as the sale. By March 13, Seacoast shares had fallen approximately 20%.

In April 2025, Moskowitz disclosed stock purchases totalling between $20,000 and $300,000 across twenty companies. The trades occurred shortly after President Trump implemented new tariffs, which temporarily lowered stock prices, as the markets rose two days later after Trump announced a 90-day pause on the tariffs. In response to questions about the timing of the trades, his spokesperson said they were made by an outside financial advisor.

=== Committee assignments ===
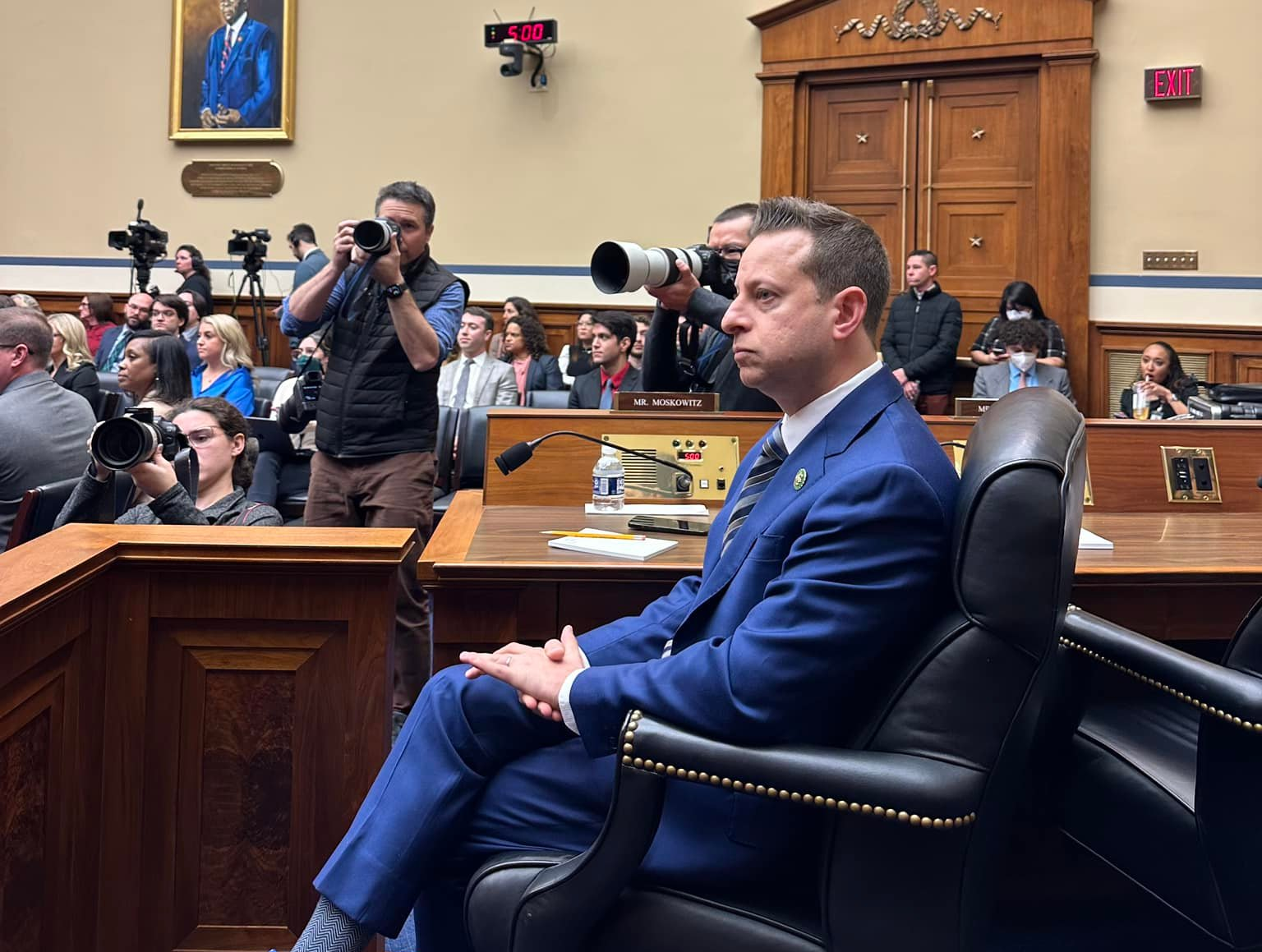
Moskowitz on the Oversight Committee, 2023

Moskowitz's committee assignments for the 119th Congress include:

- Committee on Foreign Affairs
  - Subcommittee on East Asia and Pacific
  - Subcommittee on Oversight and Intelligence (ranking member)
- Committee on the Judiciary
  - Subcommittee on Crime and Federal Government Surveillance
  - Subcommittee on Oversight

=== Caucus memberships ===
Moskowitz's caucus memberships include:

- Black Maternal Health Caucus
- Congressional Equality Caucus
- Congressional Ukraine Caucus
- Future Forum
- New Democrat Coalition
- Bipartisan School Safety and Security Caucus (co-chair)
- Disaster Preparedness and Recovery Caucus (co-chair and co-founder)

== Political positions ==
Moskowitz votes as a centrist Democrat. He describes himself as having both progressive and conservative views.

=== COVID-19 policy ===
In February 2023, Moskowitz was one of 11 Democrats who voted for a resolution to end the COVID-19 national emergency.

=== Department of Government Efficiency ===
Moskowitz was the only Democrat to join the Department of Government Efficiency (DOGE) caucus in Congress. He proposed reorganizing the Department of Homeland Security (DHS) by potentially removing agencies such as the Federal Emergency Management Agency (FEMA) and the Secret Service from its jurisdiction. This proposal aims to reduce the size of the DHS.

=== Israel–Palestine ===
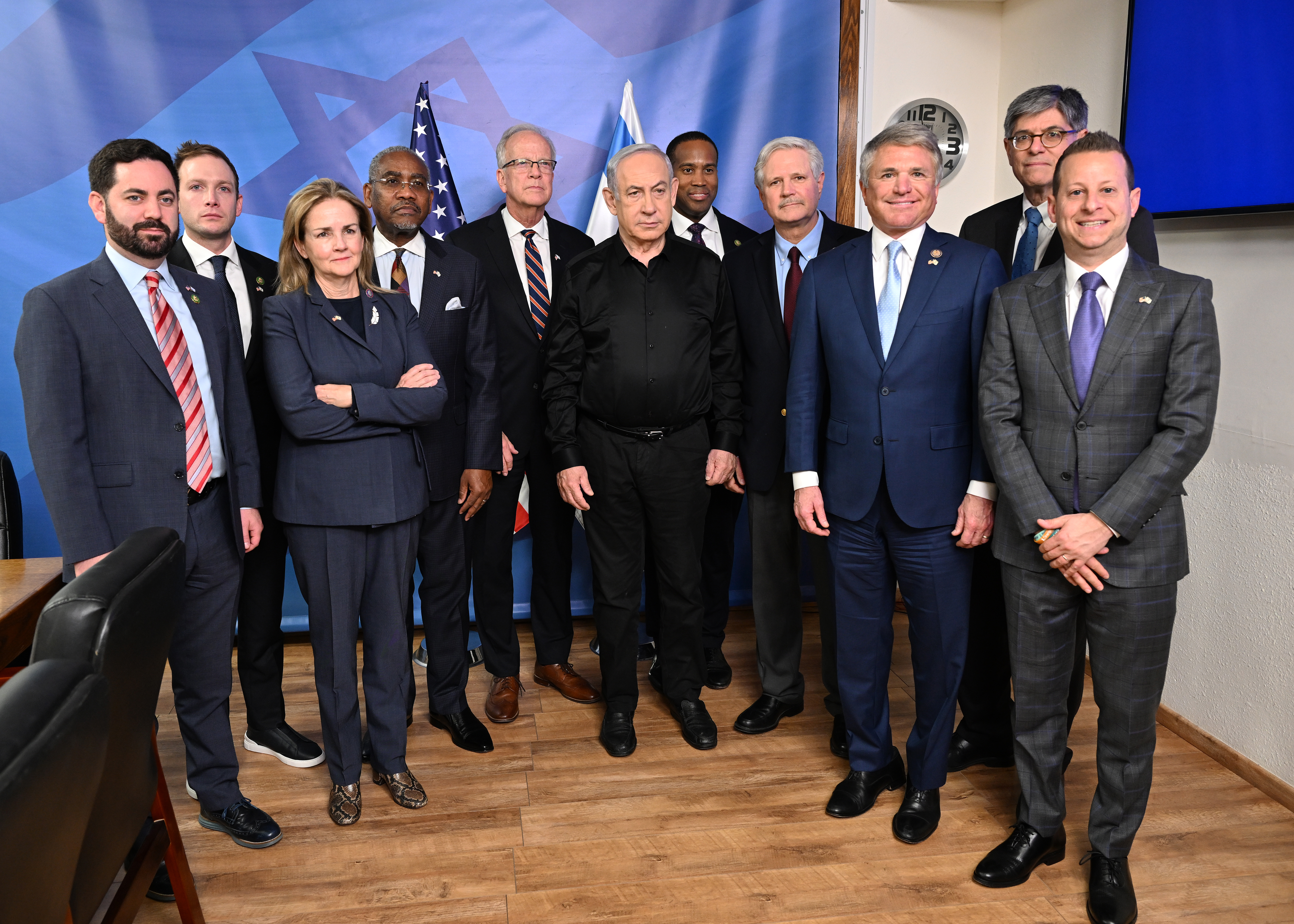
Moskowitz with Prime Minister Netanyahu in Israel, 2023

In November 2023, Moskowitz was one of 12 House Democrats to vote for a $14.3 billion aid package to Israel that was funded by cutting the Internal Revenue Service (IRS) budget, saying that he was not "going to take the bait". He wrote on October 10 supporting strong retaliation by Israel after the October 7 attacks, "This is the largest attack in Israel in 50 years, The response will be the largest response in 50 years. Blame Hamas. They knew Israel would respond in kind. They didn't care that this would get people in Gaza killed."

He criticized pro-Palestinians demonstrations at Columbia University as anti-Semitic and said that the university leadership did not protect Jewish students. Moskowitz said the International Criminal Court arrest warrant for Benjamin Netanyahu was "irrelevant because Israel is not a party to their treaty" and called it "the Harry Potter Ministry of Magic".

In June 2024, Moskowitz along with Representative Josh Gottheimer, and three Republicans introduced an amendment to the State Department’s funding bill barring the Biden administration from citing Gaza Health Ministry death tolls. The House passed it 269–144, with support from 62 Democrats and all but two Republicans. The Gaza Health Ministry, long cited by U.S. and Israeli officials and media, is the only official source for death data in Gaza.

Moskowitz criticized the New York University grad speaker over his pro-Palestine graduation speech in May 2025 saying: "He lied to the university. Second of all, he lied to everyone listening. There's no genocide going on in Israel. There is a war, it's unfortunate, and there are people in harm's way because of what Hamas did. Yes, there are situations that I wish would improve, like, you know, getting more food into Gaza. But at the end of the day, that's up to the university whether they give him his diploma or not. You know, in fact, they can give him his diploma, it's not going to matter. Good luck getting a job. That was a stupid, selfish thing, ruined the ceremony for a lot of families."

=== Immigration ===
In 2025, Moskowitz was one of 46 House Democrats who joined all Republicans to vote for the Laken Riley Act.

== Personal life ==
Moskowitz is married to Leah Rifkin, and they have two children. They live in Coral Springs. He is Jewish.

== Electoral history ==
2012 Florida House of Representatives election, 97th district
Party	Candidate	Votes	%
Democratic	Jared Moskowitz	45,567	68.83
Republican	James Gleason	20,640	31.17
Total votes		66,207	100
Democratic hold			

2014 Florida House of Representatives election, 97th district
Party	Candidate	Votes	%
Democratic	Jared Moskowitz (incumbent)	unopposed	100
Total votes		N/A	100
Democratic hold			

2016 Florida House of Representatives election, 97th district
Party	Candidate	Votes	%
Democratic	Jared Moskowitz (incumbent)	unopposed	100
Total votes		N/A	100
Democratic hold			

2018 Florida House of Representatives election, 97th district
Primary election
Party	Candidate	Votes	%
Democratic	Jared Moskowitz (incumbent)	17,702	78.82
Democratic	Imtiaz Mohammad	4,758	21.18
Total votes		22,460	100
General election
Democratic	Jared Moskowitz (incumbent)	unopposed	100
Total votes		N/A	100
Democratic hold			

2022 U.S. House of Representatives election, Florida's 23rd district
Primary election
Party	Candidate	Votes	%
Democratic	Jared Moskowitz	38,822	61.11
Democratic	Ben Sorensen	13,012	20.48
Democratic	Hava Holzhauer	5,276	8.31
Democratic	Allen Ellison	3,960	6.23
Democratic	Mike Trout	1,390	2.19
Democratic	Michaelangelo Hamilton	1,064	1.67
Total votes		63,524	100
General election
Democratic	Jared Moskowitz	143,951	51.59
Republican	Joe Budd	130,681	46.83
Independent	Christine Scott	3,079	1.10
Independent	Mark Napier	1,338	0.48
Total votes		279,049	100
Democratic hold			

2024 U.S. House of Representatives election, Florida's 23rd district
Party	Candidate	Votes	%
Democratic	Jared Moskowitz (incumbent)	196,311	52.45
Republican	Joe Kaufman	178,006	47.55
Total votes		374,317	100
Democratic hold			

2026 U.S. House of Representatives election, Florida's 25th district
Primary election
Party	Candidate	Votes	%
Democratic	Jared Moskowitz (incumbent)	28,330	63.48
Democratic	Oliver Larkin	16,301	36.52
Total votes		44,631	100

== See also ==
- List of Jewish members of the United States Congress

U.S. House of Representatives
Preceded by Debbie Wasserman Schultz	Member of the U.S. House of Representatives from Florida's 23rd congressional district 2023–present	Incumbent
U.S. order of precedence (ceremonial)
Preceded by Nathaniel Moran	United States representatives by seniority 339th	Succeeded by Kevin Mullin
