= Lisa Dunkley =

American politician

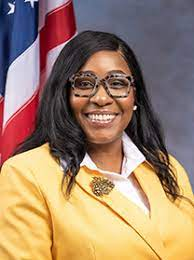
- Dunkley in 2023

Member of the Florida House of Representatives from the 97th district
- Incumbent
- Assumed office November 8, 2022
- Preceded by: Dan Daley

Personal details
- Party: Democratic

Lisa A. Dunkley is an American politician serving in the Florida House of Representatives representing District 97 since 2022.

== Life ==
Lisa Dunkley was born in Jamaica. She moved to Florida in 1995. She completed a B.B.A. from the Florida Atlantic University. She retired from the United States Army after serving her final tour in Iraq. She worked for the Florida Department of Transportation. and later transitioned to the non-profit sector.

During the 2022 Florida House of Representatives election, Dunkley, a Democrat, won a three-way primary with 62% of the vote.
