= Christine Hunschofsky =

American politician

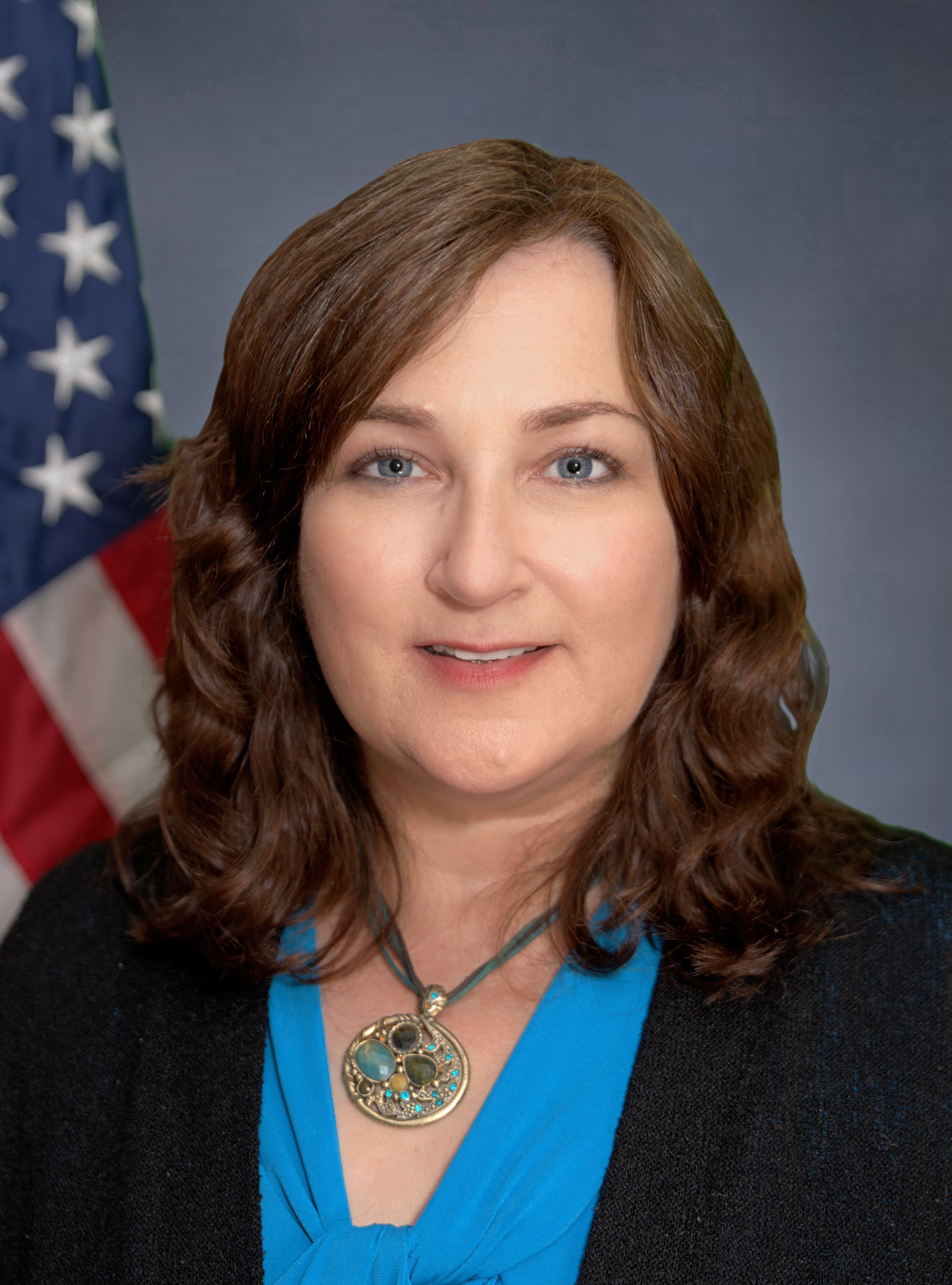

Minority Leader of the Florida House of Representatives
- Incumbent
- Assumed office November 3, 2026
- Preceded by: Fentrice Driskell

Member of the Florida House of Representatives
- Incumbent
- Assumed office November 3, 2020
- Preceded by: Kristin Jacobs
- Constituency: 96th district (2020–2022); 95th district (2022–present)

Mayor of Parkland, Florida
- In office January 2017 – November 3, 2020
- Preceded by: Michael Udine
- Succeeded by: Rich Walker

Personal details
- Born: Boston, Massachusetts, U.S.
- Party: Democratic
- Spouse: Hannes
- Children: 2
- Education: Babson College (1996), Boston University (1992)

Christine Hunschofsky is an American politician from the state of Florida. A Democrat, she has been a member of the Florida House of Representatives since 2020, after serving as the mayor of Parkland from 2016 to 2020.

== Early life ==
Hunschofsky grew up in Boston, and attended Boston Latin School. She graduated from Boston University with a Bachelor of Science in business administration and a Bachelor of Arts in philosophy. She also graduated from Babson College in 1996 with her MBA.

== Political career ==
=== Mayor of Parkland ===
After moving to Parkland, Hunschofsky became involved with the community. She was a member of the Parkland Education Advisory Board for 7 years, wrote for Parkland Life Magazine, and was involved with the Mary Help of Christians Catholic Church. She was elected City Commissioner in March 2013 with 84 percent of the vote, and in 2016 ran for Mayor of Parkland and won with 76 percent of the vote.

Hunschofsky was mayor on February 14, 2018, when 17 were killed and another 17 were wounded in a mass shooting at Marjory Stoneman Douglas High School in Parkland. Afterward, she and other mayors went to Washington, D.C. to lobby the federal government for stricter background checks for those purchasing guns, and other gun control measures. Their efforts were not successful, and no bill was passed at the time.

Hunschofsky spoke at a community event on the anniversary of the shooting, saying "While we are still healing, while a lot of this is still raw, to see the human spirit that we have here in Parkland, I think that's the message. We might have been shaken but we refuse to be down for the count."

=== Florida House of Representatives ===
In 2020 she ran for Kristin Jacobs' vacated Florida House District 96 seat, receiving an endorsement from 2020 presidential candidate Pete Buttigieg, as well as local officials such as Florida Senator Kevin Rader and Representatives Dan Daley, Michael Gottlieb, and Tina Polsky, in addition to many other Florida politicians, including many mayors. She also received an endorsement from Fred Guttenberg, the father of one of the Parkland Shooting victims, who praised Hunschofsky for being "truly there for our community" and working "tirelessly to guide our city through its darkest days." She won the primary election with 72.2% of the vote to her opponent Saima Farooqui's 20.7%, who also ran against Kristin Jacobs in 2018. Hunschofsky faced no Republican opponent in the general election.

== Elections ==
2020 Florida's 96th House district Primary Election
Party	Candidate	Votes	%
Democratic	Christine Hunschofsky	13,052	72.0
Democratic	Saima Farooqui	5,088	28.0
Total votes		18,140	100%
