= Jack N. Tobin =

American politician (1941–2011)

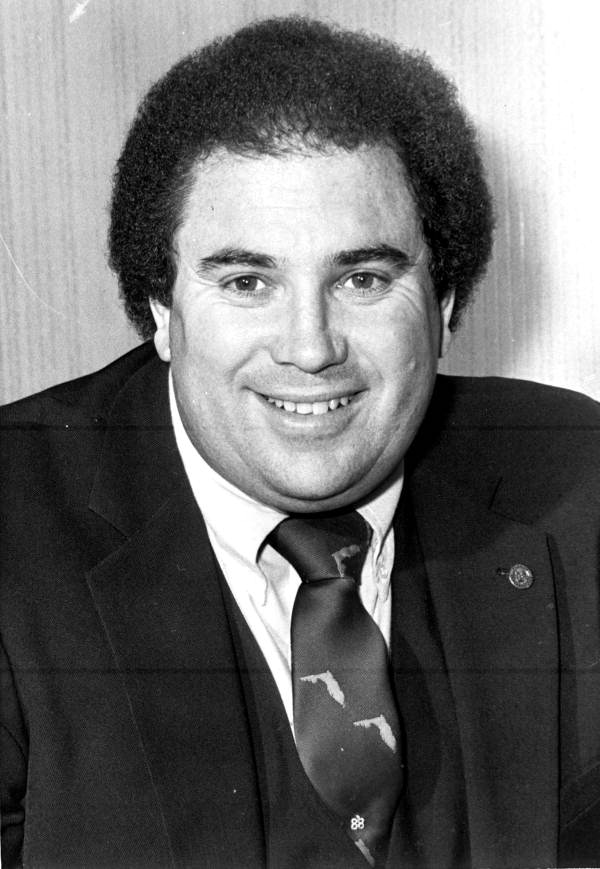
- Tobin in 1992

Member of the Florida House of Representatives
- In office November 2, 1982 – November 3, 1998
- Preceded by: Tom Gustafson
- Succeeded by: Ron Greenstein
- Constituency: 88th District (1982–1992); 95th District (1992–1998)

Personal details
- Born: September 14, 1941 New York, U.S.
- Died: April 19, 2011 (aged 69)
- Party: Democratic
- Education: New York University

Jack N. Tobin (September 14, 1941 – April 19, 2011) was an American politician. He served as a Democratic member for the 88th and 95th district of the Florida House of Representatives.

== Life and career ==
Tobin was born in New York. He attended New York University.

In 1982, Tobin was elected to represent the 88th district of the Florida House of Representatives, succeeding Tom Gustafson. He served until 1992, when he was succeeded by Suzanne Jacobs. In the same year, he was elected to represent the 95th district, succeeding Anne Mackenzie. He served until 1998, when he was succeeded by Ron Greenstein.

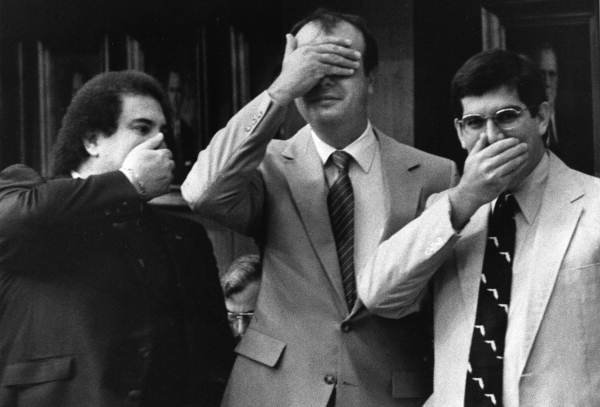
Tobin (left) with Joseph H. Titone and Peter Deutsch in the 1980s or 1990s

Tobin died on April 19, 2011, at the age of 69.
