= Tracy Stafford =

American politician

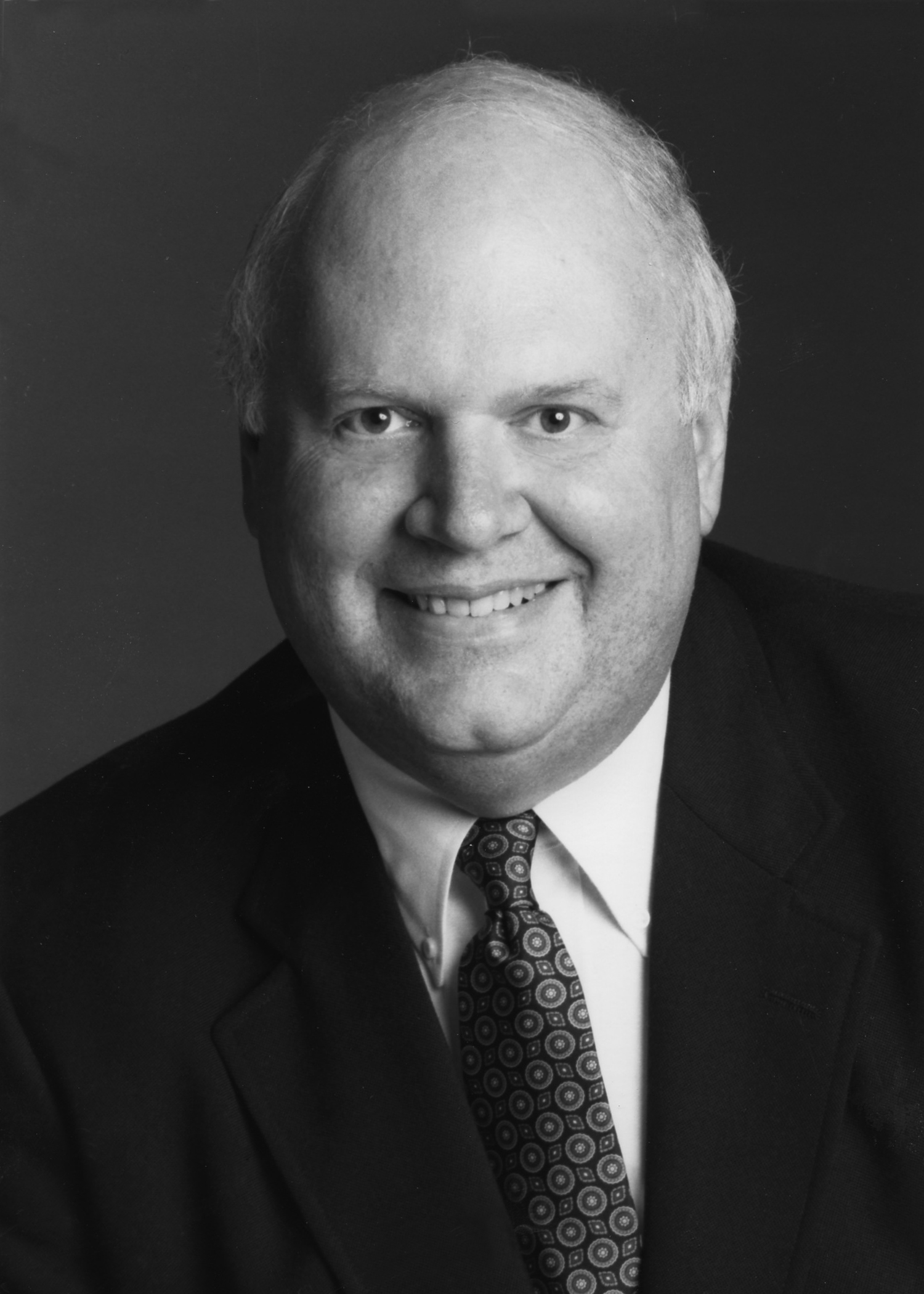

Florida House of Representatives

Member of the Florida House of Representatives 94th district (1990–1992) 92nd district (1992–2000)
- In office 1990–2000
- Preceded by: Tom Gustafson (94th); John Rayson (92nd)
- Succeeded by: Josephus Eggelletion, Jr. (94th); Jack Seiler (92nd)

Personal details
- Born: January 2, 1948 (age 78)
- Party: Democratic

Tracy Stafford (born January 2, 1948, in Fort Lauderdale, Florida) served in the Florida House of Representatives from 1990 to 2000. He currently lives in Wilton Manors, Florida, where he also served as mayor from 1986 to 1990.

== Family ==
A fifth-generation Floridian, Tracy Eugene Stafford was born the elder child of Leslie Stafford, who worked for the Eli Witt Company, and Marcia Stafford, a kindergarten teacher and City Clerk for the City of Wilton Manors. Tracy's younger sister is actress and author Nancy Stafford who was crowned Miss Florida in 1976 and would later work as an actress on the TV series Matlock. At the 39th Annual Pioneer Day Event at the Fort Lauderdale History Center on December 3, 2011, the Broward County Historical Commission named both Tracy and Nancy as Broward County Pioneers.

== Education ==
After graduating from Ft. Lauderdale High School, Tracy attended the University of Florida where he attained his Bachelor of Arts degree in English Literature and his Juris Doctor. He was a member of the Phi Kappa Psi fraternity, Florida Beta chapter and was elected three times to the position of Archon, representing District IV on the national Fraternity's Executive Council for a total of five years. The District IV seat was also once held by President Woodrow Wilson.

== Political Races ==
Tracy was elected to the Wilton Manors City Council, serving from 1975-1981. During that time, he made an unsuccessful run for the Florida House of Representatives in 1978 when members were elected in multi-member districts. He left the Council in 1981 to accept the position of city administrator. He ran for Mayor of Wilton Manors in 1986 and won the first of two terms, serving as mayor for a total of four years.

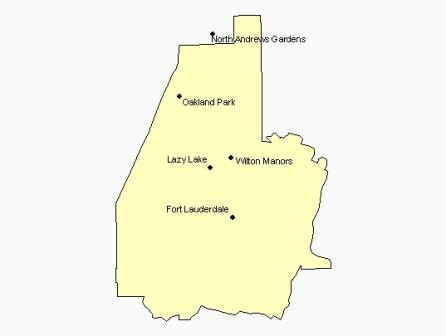
Florida House District 94 (1982-1992 maps). WP:C Courtesy: Florida Office of Economic & Demographic Research http://edr.state.fl.us/

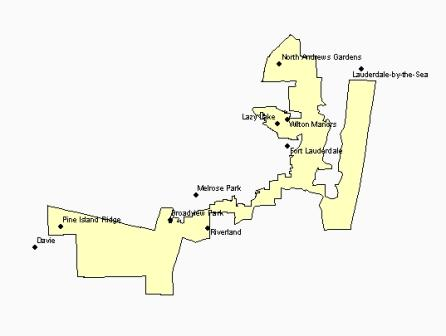
Florida House District 92 (1992-2002 maps). WP:C Courtesy: Florida Office of Economic & Demographic Research http://edr.state.fl.us/

In 1990 when District 94 occupant and House Speaker Tom Gustafson was retiring from the Florida Legislature, Tracy ran as a Democrat for the open seat, beating Republican Bobbi Elder to win the first of five consecutive elections to the Florida House of Representatives, which by this time had reformed its composition to single-member districts. At that time, District 94 encompassed all of Wilton Manors, Lazy Lake, some of Oakland Park and much of Ft. Lauderdale.

Because of redistricting that would take effect in 1992, Wilton Manors and some of the neighborhoods of Ft. Lauderdale and Oakland Park that had been in District 94 were now in the new District 92. However, District 92 would be a "swing district" of which 70 percent of its area was new and its voter composition having a Republican plurality but no partisan majority. District 92 would include most of Wilton Manors, Lazy Lake, the eastern half of Oakland Park, and a large portion of Ft. Lauderdale including Middle River Terrace, Poinsettia Heights, Lake Ridge, Victoria Park, Colee Hammock, Tarpon River, Shady Banks, the southern half of Coral Ridge Isles and all of Ft. Lauderdale beach from the Galt Ocean Mile to Harbor Beach. District 92 would also include around a third of Davie and some (at the time) unincorporated areas such as Broadview Park, Pine Island Ridge, Riverland, Lauderdale Isles and the North Andrews Neighborhood Association a.k.a. North Andrews Gardens.

In 1992, Tracy successfully fended off a Democratic primary challenger and then beat the Republican Mayor of Davie and former Miami Dolphins quarterback Earl Morrall with 51.6 percent of the vote. Tracy would subsequently win election over three more Republicans including former Broward County Commissioner Jack Moss in 1994 with 55.49 percent of the vote and George LeMieux in 1998 with 56.49 percent of the vote. LeMieux would later become a Chief of Staff to Governor Charlie Crist and then be appointed a United States Senator from Florida.

Due to term limits, Tracy retired from the Florida House of Representatives in 2000 and was replaced by the Democratic Mayor of Wilton Manors Jack Seiler.

== Legislative accomplishments ==
At various times during his five terms in the Florida House of Representatives, Tracy served as Chair of the House Juvenile Justice Committee, Broward County Legislative Delegation and Florida Advisory Council on Intergovernmental Relations. He was also appointed to chair a task force on contraband forfeiture to make recommendations to state lawmakers on how to provide a proper balance within Florida law between the ability of law enforcement to seize property used in the commission of a crime and to protect the property rights of individuals. In addition, Tracy served as a member of the House Criminal Justice Committee and House Judiciary Committee.

One of Tracy's biggest legislative accomplishments was his placing the Hoffman-LaRoche drug Rohypnol - known clinically as flunitrazepam and commonly as "roofies" - in Schedule I of the state statutes, effectively banning the date rape drug in Florida with severe penalties for its possession and use. While it took two sessions of the Florida Legislature to pass the measure, it was the first bill signed into law by Governor Lawton Chiles in 1997, becoming Laws of Florida, Chapter 97-1. Tracy also passed legislation into law that allows the eviction of a person convicted of a crime from a rental property within 72 hours if that property was used in the commission of the crime, such as prostitution or drug dealing.

Tracy also passed legislation ensuring that the results of a person's genetic test - that would potentially show a predisposition for a disease - would remain a private document at the discretion of the individual. Florida would then become only the fourth state to provide such protection to its residents. The effect of the legislation would prevent insurance companies and others from obtaining the information and then using it to make medical coverage either unaffordable or unavailable.

Prior to the common use of the Internet, Tracy introduced legislation that would have mandated that information about the legislative process in the Florida Legislature be posted on the World Wide Web. He was also one of the first state legislators in Florida to provide an e-mail address for communication with constituents.

Tracy would be the first member of the Florida House of Representatives to introduce legislation that would provide domestic partnership benefits to same-sex couples.

Florida House of Representatives
Preceded by Tom Gustafson	Member of the Florida House of Representatives from the 94th district 1990–1992	Succeeded by Josephus Eggelletion, Jr.
Preceded by John Rayson	Member of the Florida House of Representatives from the 92nd district 1992–2000	Succeeded by Jack Seiler
