= Fred Lippman =

American politician

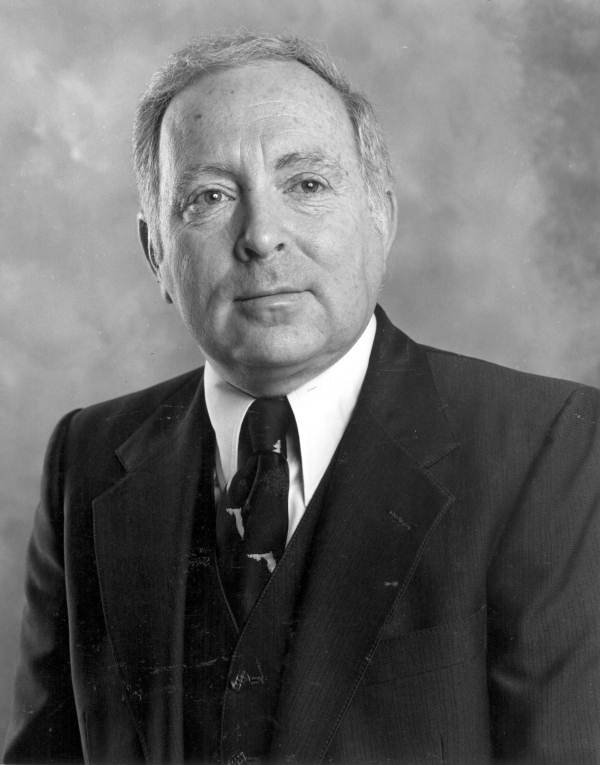

Member of the Florida House of Representatives
- In office November 7, 1978 – November 3, 1998
- Preceded by: John Adams
- Succeeded by: Eleanor Sobel
- Constituency: 94th district (1978–1982); 97th district (1982–1992); 100th district (1992–1998)

Personal details
- Born: April 13, 1935 Brooklyn, New York, U.S.
- Party: Democratic
- Occupation: Pharmacist

Frederick Lippman (born April 13, 1935) is an American former politician from the state of Florida.

Lippman was born in Brooklyn, New York, and attended Columbia University and the Columbia University College of Pharmacy. He was a pharmacist. He served in the Florida House of Representatives for the 100th district from 1978 to 1999, as a Democrat.
