= Susan Goldstein =

American politician (born 1958)

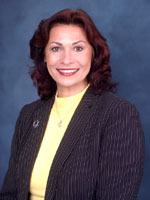

Member of the Florida House of Representatives from the 97th district
- In office November 2, 2004 – November 7, 2006
- Preceded by: Nan Rich
- Succeeded by: Marty Kiar

Personal details
- Born: February 24, 1958 (age 68) Pittsburgh, Pennsylvania
- Party: Republican
- Spouse: Irv Goldstein
- Children: 2
- Occupation: Investment banker, community activist

Susan K. Goldstein (born February 24, 1958) is a Republican politician from Florida who served as a member of the Florida House of Representatives from the 97th district from 2004 to 2006.

== Early life ==
Goldstein was born in Pittsburgh, Pennsylvania, in 1958. She was an investment banker, and took classes at the Parkway Technical Institute and Financial Estate Institute. Goldstein moved to Florida in 1981, and when her daughter, Stephanie, was born with autism, she quit her job to advocate for children. She served as the vice president of the Autism Society of Florida and lobbied for legislation to provide for autism insurance coverage.

== Florida House of Representatives ==
In 2004, when State Representative Nan Rich opted to run for the State Senate rather than seek re-election, Goldstein ran to succeed her in the Florida House of Representatives from the 97th district. She won the Republican primary unopposed, and faced Weston City Commissioner Barbara Herrera-Hill, the Democratic nominee, in the general election. Goldstein narrowly defeated Herrera-Hill, winning 51 percent of the vote to her 49 percent.

Goldstein ran for re-election in 2006, and was challenged by attorney Marty Kiar, who won the Democratic nomination. The race attracted attention from both parties, and Goldstein was defeated by Kiar, who won 53 percent of the vote to her 47 percent.

== Post-legislative career ==
After leaving the legislature, Goldstein worked as a lobbyist. She endorsed Marco Rubio's presidential campaign in 2016, and was one of five co-chairs of his campaign in Broward County. In 2018, following the controversy over a tweet by Roseanne Barr referring to Barack Obama as an "ape," Goldstein attracted criticism for comparing Obama to Curious George.
