= Ari Porth =

American politician

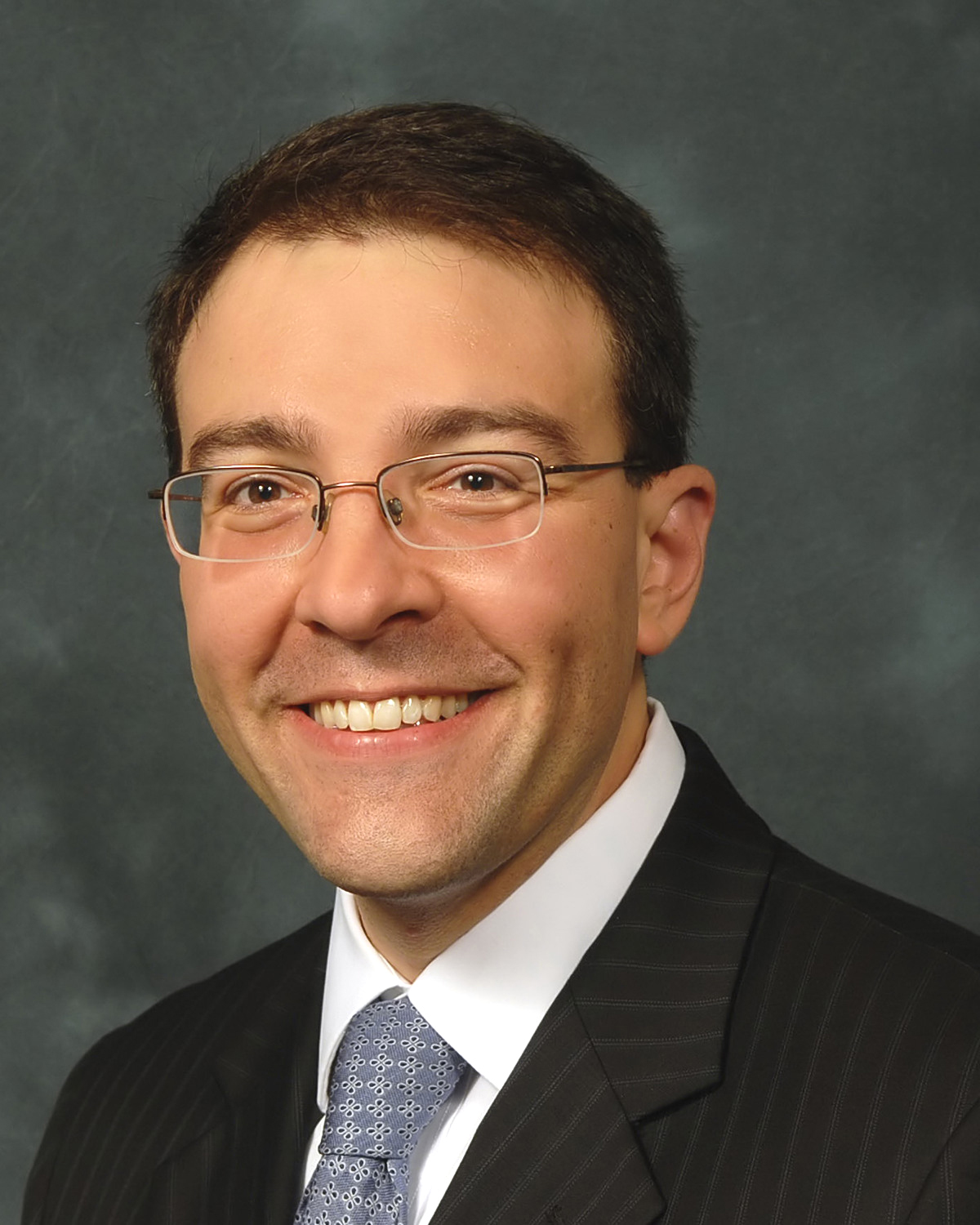

Judge of the Broward Circuit Court
- Incumbent
- Assumed office January 2013

Member of the Florida House of Representatives from the 96th district
- In office November 16, 2004 – November 20, 2012
- Preceded by: Stacy Ritter
- Succeeded by: Jim Waldman

Personal details
- Born: September 25, 1970 (age 56) Washington, D.C.
- Spouse: Tatyana Porth
- Children: Gabriel
- Education: Northeastern University (B.S.); Nova Southeastern University (J.D.)
- Profession: Attorney

Ari Abraham Porth (born September 25, 1970, Washington, D.C.) is an American attorney, jurist, and politician. From 2004 to 2012, he served as a member of the Florida House of Representatives. Porth currently serves as a Circuit Court Judge in Broward County, Florida.

== Personal life ==
After attending public schools in both Florida and Michigan, Porth graduated from Northeastern University and went to work for Senator Bob Graham as a legislative aide in Washington, D.C. While working for the Senator, he focused on issues related to veterans, substance use and AIDS.

Porth moved back home to South Florida where he received his J.D. degree from Nova Southeastern University and served as an Assistant State Attorney for Broward County from 1995 through 2012 where he tried juveniles and adults for crimes against property and person. Porth's last assignment at the SAO was with the Truancy Division, working to improve school attendance in partnership with law enforcement, schools, children, parents, and the courts.

Porth has held leadership roles and remains active in a number of civic and charitable organizations including the Associated Marine Institute at Ft. Lauderdale, the B'nai B'rith Justice Unit, Hatikvah House, and Children's Home Society.

Porth lives with his wife, Tatyana, and their son, Gabriel in Coral Springs, Florida.

== Political career ==
In 2004, Porth was first elected to the Florida House of Representatives in 2004, succeeding Stacy Ritter. He served District 96, which represented parts of Coral Springs, Tamarac, Lauderhill, Sunrise, and North Lauderdale in Broward County.

He served on the Policy Council, the Health Services Policy Council, the Health Regulations Committee, the Criminal Justice Appropriations Committee, the Select Committee on Standards of Official Conduct and the Select Committee on Florida's Strategic and Economic Future. Porth also chaired the Legislature's Early Childhood Caucus and the Broward Legislative Delegation.

Two of the most significant bills Porth sponsored and passed in the House include SB 2142 Protecting Florida's Investments Act of 2007 and SB 2654 the Window of Opportunity Act of 2008. The first divested Florida's pension plan investments from any dealings with Iran or Sudan and served as landmark legislation nationally. The second required certain insurance companies to provide behavioral therapies for children on the Autism spectrum. During the 2011 session, Porth worked on prison sentencing reform for nonviolent offenders (HB 917) and passed a bill authorizing Florida's first public boarding school for at risk youth and creating services for juveniles who have gone through the delinquency system (SB 404).
