= George LeMieux =

American lawyer and politician (born 1969)

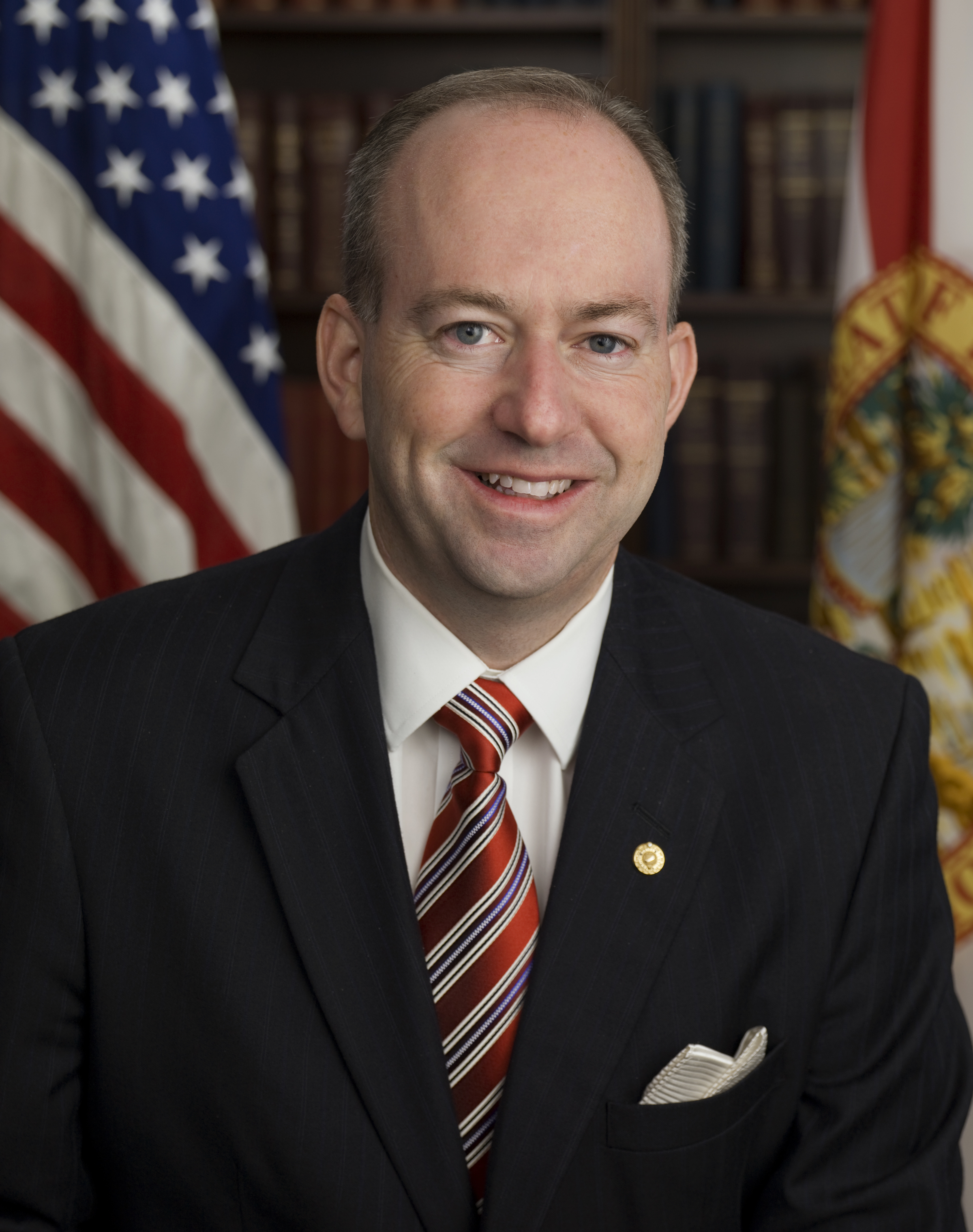
- Official portrait, 2009

United States Senator from Florida
- In office September 9, 2009 – January 3, 2011
- Appointed by: Charlie Crist
- Preceded by: Mel Martínez
- Succeeded by: Marco Rubio

Personal details
- Born: George Stephen LeMieux; May 21, 1969 (age 57) Fort Lauderdale, Florida, U.S.
- Party: Republican
- Children: 4
- Education: Emory University (BA); Georgetown University (JD)
- LeMieux's voice LeMieux outlining a plan for U.S. assistance after the 2010 Haiti earthquake. Recorded February 25, 2010

George Stephen LeMieux (/ləˈmjuː/; born May 21, 1969) is an American former politician who was a United States senator from Florida from 2009 to 2011. He is chairman of the Florida-based law firm of Gunster, Yoakley & Stewart and was chief of staff to Governor Charlie Crist. He was the Deputy Florida Attorney General and is credited with spearheading Crist's successful campaign for governor. In 2009, Crist appointed LeMieux as U.S. Senator to replace Mel Martínez, who resigned.

== Early life and education ==
LeMieux was born in Fort Lauderdale, Florida, the son of Karen Ann (née Huckestein) and George Harvey LeMieux, a building contractor and secretary to the company. He grew up in Coral Springs, Florida, and graduated in 1987 from Coral Springs High School. He enrolled at Emory University, where he majored in political science, served as Chapter President of the Beta Epsilon chapter of Delta Tau Delta fraternity and graduated magna cum laude with Phi Beta Kappa membership in 1991. He was Senior Orator that year. He went on to earn his Juris Doctor, cum laude, from the Georgetown University Law Center in 1994.

He interned for Congressman Clay Shaw and U.S. Senator Connie Mack III. In 1994, he joined the law firm of Gunster Yoakley & Stewart P.A. in its Fort Lauderdale office. LeMieux is an AV-rated attorney, and focuses his legal practice on resolving business and governmental disputes and advising CEOs and C-suite executives on business, law, and government from a local, state, and national perspective. He continued his practice there for eight years, at which time he left to serve as Florida's Deputy Attorney General and Chief of Staff to the Attorney General's Office, where he supervised more than 400 lawyers and 1,300 total staff.

== Career ==
=== Public service career ===
LeMieux worked closely with Charlie Crist and is credited with being the "maestro" of Crist's campaign for Governor. His friendship with Crist began in the 1990s when Crist was a state senator from St. Petersburg and LeMieux was working to expand the role of the Republican Party in Broward County, which is strongly Democratic.

In 1998, LeMieux ran for the state House, pitted against four-term incumbent Democrat Tracy Stafford. According to the St. Petersburg Times, during the campaign, he went to more than 10,000 doors in a district drawn to protect a Democrat. He campaigned for better health insurance, leaner bureaucracy and smaller class sizes. "I remember sitting in classrooms in Broward County with 40 kids in them", the St. Petersburg Times quoted him as saying. He also backed a $100 limit on the amount of money out-of-state companies could give to Florida candidates as a way of allowing working people to have a bigger impact in the system. After losing the race, LeMieux became head of the Republican Party in Broward County.

In 2002, Crist asked LeMieux to be his chief of staff in the Attorney General's office. LeMieux left the firm of Gunster Yoakley to take the position upon Crist's assumption of the office on January 7, 2003. LeMieux also served as chief of staff for Crist's 2006 campaign for governor which defeated rival Tom Gallagher by 32 points to win the GOP nomination. As campaign chief of staff, LeMieux shaped Crist's message and made key strategic moves, such as demanding lecterns for the second TV debate with Democratic opponent Jim Davis instead of a conference table, and also for deciding that Crist would not accompany President Bush on the day before the election. When asked why Crist was not attending the President's visit to Florida, Karl Rove responded "just ask George LeMieux". He also advised Crist regarding the selection of running mate Jeff Kottkamp. Crist defeated Davis and was inaugurated Governor of Florida on January 2, 2007.

While in public service, LeMieux managed more than 400 lawyers as Deputy Attorney General, led compact negotiations with the Seminole Tribe of Florida as Chief of Staff to the Governor, and supervised all aspects of the Executive Office of the Governor including the Governor's legislative agenda, policy initiatives and the management of the agencies that report to the Governor. Shortly before leaving public office, he took on the role as Governor Crist's liaison to the Council of 100, a nonpartisan group of high-powered business leaders, noting that Crist wanted him to work with the council to find ways of helping businesses.

=== Returning to the private sector ===
In January 2008, LeMieux returned to the law firm of Gunster Yoakley, residing in both its Fort Lauderdale office and its newer Tallahassee office. Within three months of rejoining, LeMieux was named chairman of the firm.

=== U.S. Senator ===
LeMieux proposed "the 2007 Solution", a plan to eliminate the deficit by 2013 and cut the national public debt nearly in half by 2020.

On Thursday, May 13, 2010, the Senate adopted an amendment to the then-pending Financial Regulatory Reform that was authored by LeMieux and Senator Maria Cantwell of Washington. An editorial in the Wall Street Journal applauded the LeMieux amendment saying its reforms would "destroy the government-created ratings cartel" and that "Mr. LeMieux wants institutions to do some actual due diligence on the assets they hold instead of simply complying with the law by holding assets with a high rating from S&P."

LeMieux was involved in the high-profile blockage of President Barack Obama's nominee for United States Ambassador to Brazil, Thomas A. Shannon Jr., who was eventually confirmed.

During his time in the Senate, LeMieux was recognized for his record on pro-business and tax reform. He has received several awards including a 93% rating from the National Taxpayers Union and the "Spirit of Enterprise" award from the U.S. Chamber of Commerce.

=== 2012 United States Senate election ===
On April 15, 2011, LeMieux launched his candidacy for the United States Senate seat held by Bill Nelson. While running for the seat, LeMieux campaigned on a platform of fiscal responsibility until dropping out of the race on June 20, 2012. He subsequently endorsed Republican Representative Connie Mack IV.

=== The LeMieux Center for Public Policy ===
On December 7, 2012, LeMieux and Palm Beach Atlantic University President William M.B. Fleming Jr. founded the LeMieux Center for Public Policy. According to the University president, "The LeMieux Center will provide students with opportunities to engage with state and national officials, journalists, authors, academics and other notable thought leaders on issues important to Florida, the United States and the world. The LeMieux Center will host an annual interactive lecture series featuring notable speakers on issues of public policy and servant leadership." According to the University, the LeMieux Center will also offer an independent study program to two PBA upperclassmen starting in the fall semester of 2013. On December 6, 2010, LeMieux decided that Palm Beach Atlantic University's Warren Library would house his senatorial papers and memorabilia from his service in the U.S. Senate.

=== The LeMieux Report ===
In February 2008, LeMieux launched The LeMieux Report, an electronic newsletter in text form and video courtesy of YouTube, offering analysis and commentary on key legal, business and political issues that impact the state's economy and business community. The report was sent out to a list of corporate movers and shakers on a weekly basis. His last video posted on August 25, 2009 focused on the governor's appointee to the Senate, a pick unknown to LeMieux himself who eventually became Mel Martínez's successor.

Our goal is to examine the hottest issues of the week that impact Florida business ... [A]s the Governor's Chief of Staff I briefed him every day on the most important issues facing Florida. Now I can share that analysis with Florida's leaders.

LeMieux said he will be able to help readers navigate through important and sometimes complex issues, offering clarity and context. He added "Business executives are busy people. They don't have the time to sift through all of the information that inundates today's professional to determine what is most important to their interests. The LeMieux Report boils it down and gives them the information they need in a format that's easy to digest."

He was admitted to the Florida Bar in 1994 and was board certified in business litigation in 2004. Other court admissions include the United States Supreme Court, United States District Court – Southern District of Florida, Middle District of Florida, Northern District of Florida; the United States Court of Appeals-Eleventh and Federal Circuits.

== Affiliations ==
Among his civic and charitable commitments, LeMieux was the Chairman of the Broward County Republican Party, Chairman of the Jeb Bush re-election campaign, Republican nominee for the Florida House of Representatives – District 92, and served on the City of Fort Lauderdale Beach Redevelopment Advisory Board. He has been a director for Goodwill of Broward County, as well as Riverwalk, Inc., and a trustee for the Greater Fort Lauderdale Chamber of Commerce. In 2002, he was named one of the 50 Most Powerful People in Broward County by Gold Coast Magazine, and 20 People on the Fast Track by Fast Track Magazine. LeMieux received the "Pollie" award from the American Association of Political Consultants as the nation's "MVP" in a Republican campaign for 2006. LeMieux served as the Executive Director of the Crist/Kottkamp transition team, and went on to lead the Executive Office of the Governor as the Governor's Chief of Staff in 2007.

== Family ==
LeMieux has three sons, George, Taylor, and Chase, and one daughter Madeleine.

U.S. Senate
Preceded by Mel Martínez	U.S. Senator (Class 3) from Florida; 2009–2011; Served alongside: Bill Nelson	Succeeded by Marco Rubio
Honorary titles
Preceded by Kirsten Gillibrand	Baby of the Senate; 2009–2010	Succeeded by Carte Goodwin
Preceded by Carte Goodwin	Baby of the Senate; 2010–2011	Succeeded by Mike Lee
U.S. order of precedence (ceremonial)
Preceded by Jim Talent as Former US Senator	Order of precedence of the United States	Succeeded by Laphonza Butler as Former US Senator
