= Tom Gustafson =

American politician

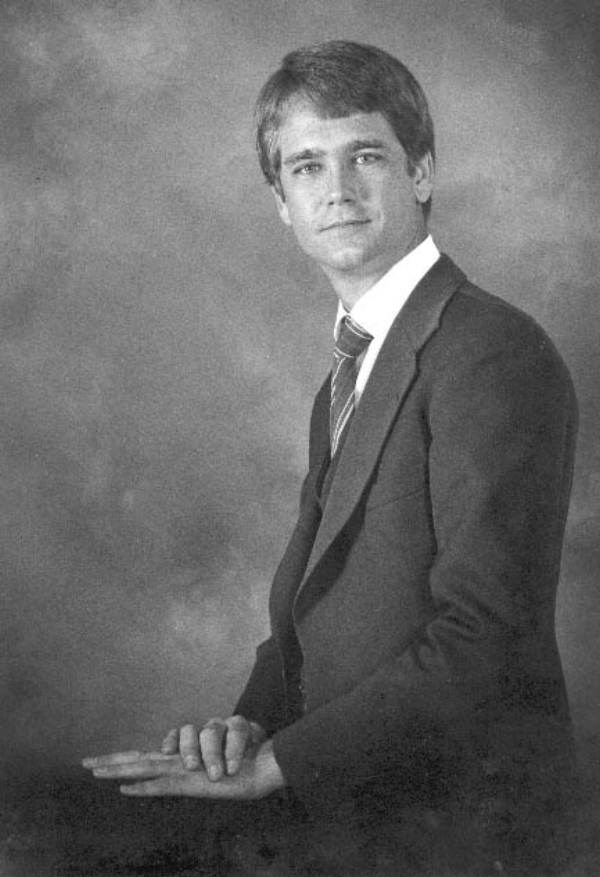
- Portrait of Gustafson from the late 1970s

85th Speaker of the Florida House of Representatives
- In office 1988–1990
- Preceded by: Jon L. Mills
- Succeeded by: T. K. Wetherell

Member of the Florida House of Representatives from the 94th district
- In office 1982–1990
- Preceded by: Fred Lippman
- Succeeded by: Tracy Stafford

Member of the Florida House of Representatives from the 88th district
- In office 1976–1982
- Preceded by: Randy Avon
- Succeeded by: Jack N. Tobin

Personal details
- Born: October 9, 1949 (age 76) Ocean City, New Jersey, U.S.
- Party: Democratic
- Spouse: Lynn
- Education: University of Notre Dame (BA; University of Florida Law School (JD)
- Occupation: Lawyer

Tom F. Gustafson Jr. (born October 9, 1949) is an American attorney and politician who served as Speaker of the Florida House of Representatives from 1988 to 1990. A member of the Democratic Party, Gustafson served in the Florida House of Representatives from 1977 to 1990, during which time he also served as majority whip from 1978 to 1980. Though born in New Jersey, Gustafson moved to Florida the year he was born and attended the University of Florida Law School after graduating from the University of Notre Dame.

Florida House of Representatives
Preceded by Randy Avon	Member of the Florida House of Representatives from the 88th district 1976–1982	Succeeded by Jack N. Tobin
Preceded by Fred Lippman	Member of the Florida House of Representatives from the 94th district 1982–1990	Succeeded by Tracy Stafford
Political offices
Preceded by Jon L. Mills	Speaker of the Florida House of Representatives; 1988–1990	Succeeded by T. K. Wetherell
