= Kristin Jacobs =

American politician (1959–2020)

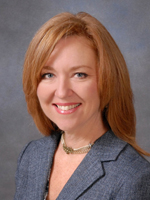

Member of the Florida House of Representatives from the 96th district
- In office November 4, 2014 – April 11, 2020
- Preceded by: Jim Waldman
- Succeeded by: Christine Hunschofsky

Mayor of Broward County
- In office November 20, 2012 – November 20, 2013
- Preceded by: John Rodstrom
- Succeeded by: Barbara Sharief
- In office November 16, 2004 – November 15, 2005
- Preceded by: Ilene Lieberman
- Succeeded by: Benjamin Graber

Member of the Broward County Commission from the 2nd district
- In office November 7, 1998 – November 16, 2014
- Preceded by: Sylvia Poitier
- Succeeded by: Mark D. Bogen

Personal details
- Born: October 17, 1959 San Diego, California, U.S.
- Died: April 11, 2020 (aged 60) Coconut Creek, Florida, U.S.
- Party: Democratic
- Children: 3
- Education: Southwestern College; Broward College

Kristin Diane Jacobs (October 17, 1959 – April 11, 2020) was an American politician who served as a member of the Florida House of Representatives from 2014 until her death in 2020. She represented the 96th District, including Coconut Creek, Margate, Coral Springs and Parkland in northeastern Broward County.

== Early life and education ==
Jacobs was born in San Diego, California, and attended Southwestern College before moving to Florida, where she attended Broward College.

== Career ==
Jacobs served on the Broward County Board of Code and Zoning and the Community Action Agency Advisory Board, founding the Coalition of Unincorporated Broward Communities, and becoming president of the North Andrews Neighborhood Association.

In 1998, Jacobs ran for a seat on the Broward County Commission from District 2, challenging incumbent Commissioner Sylvia Poitier in the Democratic Party primary. Jacobs criticized Poitier for accepting campaign contributions from developers, allowing the construction of housing developments that threatened the Everglades, and for ethics violations, and was endorsed by the Sun-Sentinel in her campaign, which called her "an articulate, energetic, well-informed challenger poised to invigorate the County Commission with new ideas, integrity and reform-minded leadership." Jacobs defeated Poitier with 54% of the vote. She faced former state representative Bob Shelley, the Republican nominee, in the general election, whom she defeated with 65% of the vote. She was re-elected in 2002, defeating Independent candidate Bob Hoffman with 82% of the vote, and again in 2006, when she defeated Hoffman, winning 86% of the vote. She was unopposed for re-election in 2010.

In 2009, she brought together four Southeast Florida counties. The counties signed a compact to speak with one voice to Federal and State government about the unique needs of the region. Building on that model, in 2013 she forged a second compact with Miami-Dade, Broward and Palm Beach Counties, agreeing to work together to achieve common goals.

In 2008, Jacobs was invited by Congress to testify on the Clean Water Act and in 2013, she was invited by the Senate to testify on Climate Change. Later in 2013, the White House asked Jacobs to meet President Barack Obama and to be a part of his address on National Climate Change Policy at Georgetown University. She was then asked by the White House to serve on the National Climate Preparedness and Resilience Task Force.

Jacobs was an advocate for women and children and introduced Broward County's Human Rights Act to prevent discrimination. She was known as the "mother" of Broward's Living Wage Ordinance, which guarantees a decent salary for county workers and contracted employees.

Jacobs was a longtime advocate of light rail and successfully fought for the passage of Broward's first streetcar, The WAVE, and Complete Streets, which added bicycle and pedestrian-friendly urban design to county roads. Jacobs worked to expand affordable housing, revitalize neighborhoods, encourage sustainable development and was an advocate for making solar energy a viable option for homeowners.

Jacobs supported the classifying of kratom as a Schedule I controlled substance.

=== 2012 Congressional campaign ===
On February 20, 2012, Jacobs announced that she would run for Congress in the newly redistricted 22nd Congressional District, which stretched along the coastline in Broward and Palm Beach counties. She campaigned as "a consensus builder" and emphasized her ability to work with others to enact public policy while maintaining her core values of protecting reproductive rights and marriage equality. She criticized her opponent, Lois Frankel, the former mayor of West Palm Beach and the former Minority Leader of the Florida House of Representatives, calling her a "divisive insider" and a "pay to play Tallahassee politician." During the campaign, she earned the endorsement of the Service Employees International Union, which praised her for having a "proven record advocating for good family-sustaining jobs, improved public transportation and smart energy independence." She also was endorsed by The Palm Beach Post, which urged voters to "make Congress work" by electing people with Jacobs' "temperament," and complimented her "experience in local and regional issues that also need to be addressed knowledgeably in Washington." Frankel defeated Jacobs by a wide margin, winning 61% of the vote to Jacobs's 39%.

=== Florida House of Representatives ===
When incumbent state representative Jim Waldman was unable to seek re-election in 2014 due to term limits, Jacobs, who was also prevented from seeking another term on the County Commission due to term limits, ran to succeed him in the 96th District. She faced former state representative Steve Perman in the Democratic Party primary, and campaigned on her strong policymaking credentials, especially on climate change and water issues, saying, "I don't think South Florida has that many experts on the issue. I come armed with information. I'm looking forward to be being part of a statewide strategy on how we deal with water issues." She defeated Perman comfortably, winning 76% of the vote to his 24%, and advanced to the general election. Jacobs only faced write-in opposition in the general election, and won nearly 100% of the vote.

=== Environmental and transportation work ===
In 2009, she was the lead official in the development of the four-county Southeast Florida Regional Climate Change Compact, creating a nonpartisan forum for the political leadership of 5.5 million residents to speak with one voice to Federal and State government about the unique needs of their region. This effort has propelled the collective advancement of regional and Broward-specific climate resiliency initiatives, now established as a national and international model. Building on that model, in 2013 she forged a second compact expanding upon common interests with Miami-Dade, Broward, and Palm Beach counties.

In 2008, she was called to testify before the U.S. House of Representatives on challenges to the Clean Water Act. In 2010, Jacobs was invited to participate in a media event with several congressional members in Washington, D.C., to encourage Congress to pass the America's Commitment to Clean Water Act.

In 2011, Jacobs was selected to serve as Chair of the White House National Ocean Council's Governance Coordinating Committee, which advised President Barack Obama on local government perspectives on ocean policy. In 2013, she was chosen to join President Obama at Georgetown University as he unveiled the nation's first Climate Action Plan. The same year, President Obama appointed her to the Local and Tribal Leaders Task Force on Climate Preparedness and Resilience.

In 2014, Jacobs continued to speak out nationally, as she was the only elected official in the United States asked to speak at the White House unveiling of its third update of the National Climate Assessment, which featured her work in Southeast Florida. Also in 2014, the U.S. Senate twice invited Jacobs to testify in Senate hearings on climate change policy.

Jacobs sponsored Broward's Complete Streets program adding bicycle and pedestrian-friendly urban design to county roads. In furtherance of this goal, she sponsored Broward's B-Cycle, the first countywide bikeshare program in the United States. She was the lead in bringing forward Broward County's first streetcar project, the Wave, which received a line-item mention in President Obama's 2014 proposed budget.

The combination of environmental and transportation projects sponsored by Jacobs have combined to place the Broward County Commission on target to reach its adopted goal to reduce CO_{2} emissions 20 percent by 2020.

== Personal life ==
Jacobs died on April 11, 2020, in Coconut Creek, Florida, of colon cancer. She was 60 years old. Jacobs had three children and three grandchildren.
