= Nan Rich =

American politician (born 1942)

Nan H. Rich
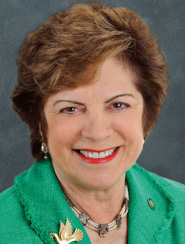

Mayor of Broward County
- In office November 28, 2023 – November 19, 2024
- Vice Mayor: Beam Furr
- Preceded by: Lamar P. Fisher
- Succeeded by: Beam Furr

Vice Mayor of Broward County
- In office November 29, 2022 – November 28, 2023
- Mayor: Lamar P. Fisher
- Preceded by: Lamar P. Fisher
- Succeeded by: Beam Furr

Member of the Broward County Commission from the 1st district
- Incumbent
- Assumed office November 22, 2016
- Preceded by: Marty Kiar

Minority Leader of the Florida Senate
- In office November 16, 2010 – November 20, 2012
- Preceded by: Al Lawson
- Succeeded by: Chris Smith

Member of the Florida Senate from the 34th district
- In office November 2, 2004 – November 6, 2012
- Preceded by: Debbie Wasserman Schultz
- Succeeded by: Redistricted

Member of the Florida House of Representatives from the 97th district
- In office November 7, 2000 – November 2, 2004
- Preceded by: Debbie Wasserman Schultz
- Succeeded by: Susan Goldstein

Personal details
- Born: February 9, 1942 (age 84) New York City, New York, U.S.
- Party: Democratic
- Spouse: David Rich
- Education: University of Florida

Nan H. Rich (born February 9, 1942) is an American politician from the state of Florida and currently serves as a county commissioner in Broward County, Florida.

== Career ==
She served as a Democratic member of the Florida Senate from 2004 to 2012. Rich served as Senate Minority Leader from 2010 to 2012 and was term-limited out of the Senate in 2012. She served in the Florida House of Representatives from 2000 to 2004.

She was a candidate for Governor of Florida in 2014, but lost the Democratic primary to Charlie Crist, who garnered 74 percent of the vote. Rich received endorsements from both the Florida NOW and NOW as well as Buddy MacKay, the most recent Democratic governor of Florida.

President Bill Clinton appointed Rich to the Board of the United States Holocaust Memorial Museum in Washington, D.C. Rich served as president of the National Council of Jewish Women (1996-1999).

== Personal life ==
Rich attended the University of Florida, where she was a member of Alpha Epsilon Phi sorority.

Florida House of Representatives
Preceded by Debbie Wasserman Schultz	Member of the Florida House of Representatives from the 97th district 2000–2004	Succeeded by Susan Goldstein
Florida Senate
Preceded by Debbie Wasserman Schultz	Member of the Florida Senate from the 34th district 2004–2012	Succeeded by Maria Sachs
Preceded by Al Lawson	Minority Leader of the Florida Senate; 2010–2012	Succeeded by Chris Smith
