= Jim Waldman =

American politician (born 1958)

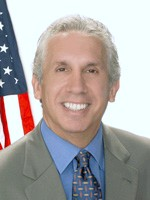

Member of the Florida House of Representatives
- In office November 7, 2006 – November 4, 2014
- Preceded by: Ron Greenstein
- Succeeded by: Kristin Jacobs
- Constituency: 95th District (2006–2012); 96th District (2012–2014)

Personal details
- Born: March 21, 1958 (age 68) Washington, D.C.
- Party: Democratic
- Education: University of Connecticut; University of Florida (B.S.B.A.); Nova University Law School (J.D.)
- Profession: Attorney

James W. Waldman (born March 21, 1958) is an American politician who served as a member of the Florida House of Representatives from 2006 to 2014, representing the 95th District from 2006 to 2012, and representing the 96th District, which included Coconut Creek, Margate, and Parkland in northeastern Broward County, from 2012 to 2014. He is part of the Democratic Party.

== History ==
Waldman was born in Washington, D.C. and attended the University of Connecticut for a few years before moving to Florida in 1977 transferring to the University of Florida in 1978, where he graduated with a degree in finance in 1980. Following this, he attended the Shepard Broad Law Center at Nova Southeastern University, graduating with his Juris Doctor in 1985. Waldman worked in private practice as an attorney and eventually rose to become the general counsel of Keiser University. In 1993, Waldman was elected to the Coconut Creek City Commission.

In 1994, Waldman resigned his seat on the Coconut Creek City Commission and challenged incumbent State Representative John Rayson in the Democratic primary in the 90th District, which included Deerfield Beach and Pompano in northern Broward County. Waldman attacked Rayson for representing X-rated clubs and for helping them to incorporate while he simultaneously staked out a public position against them, which prompted an investigation by the Florida Ethics Commission. Despite the controversy, Waldman lost to Rayson by a wide margin, winning only 40% of the vote to Rayson's 60%. Following his defeat, Waldman endorsed Rayson and called for party unity, saying, "It was a tough campaign but now is the time for Democrats to unite against the Republicans in November."

In 1999, Waldman ran again for the City Commission in District E, running against retired police captain Stanley Cohen. He campaigned on his support for economic development and for an agreement between the Seminole Tribe of Florida and Coconut Creek. The Sun-Sentinel endorsed Waldman over Cohen, noting that he brought "experience and a wide grasp of issues to the commission." Waldman defeated Cohen by a wide margin, winning 69% of the vote to Cohen's 31%. Waldman was re-elected without opposition in 2001, 2003, and 2005.

== Florida House of Representatives ==
Following the inability of Ron Greenstein to seek re-election to the Florida House of Representatives in 2006, Waldman ran to succeed him in the 95th District, which stretched from Coconut Creek to Pompano Beach in northeastern Broward County. In the Democratic primary, he faced Amy Shapiro Rose and Chris Finnegan. During the campaign, Rose attacked Waldman for making a loan to a businessman arrested for insurance fraud and for not living in the district, while Waldman emphasized his experience in municipal government. Waldman was endorsed by the Broward Teachers Union, the Broward County Council of Professional Firefighters, and the Broward County Police Benevolent Association, while Rose was endorsed by the Broward AFL-CIO, the National Alliance of Retired Americans, and the National Organization of Women. He was also endorsed by the Sun-Sentinel which noted, "His community and political experience, and his ideas, are clearly superior to his competitors," though they noted that his association with a convicted business partner was "troubling." Waldman ended up narrowly defeating narrowly defeated Amy Shapiro Rose and Chris Finnegan, winning with 45% of the vote, compared to Rose's 40% and Finnegan's 15%, and was unopposed in the general election. In 2008, Waldman faced only write-in opposition and won re-election with nearly 100% of the vote.

During his second term in the legislature, Waldman pushed legislation that increased the cigarette tax in response to budget shortfalls. He worked with fellow State Representative Kelly Skidmore on legislation that would have banned discrimination on the basis of sexual orientation or gender identity. In 2009, Waldman was one of just three Democrats to join with the Republican majority to weaken the class size amendment and to give local school districts flexibility in implementing the regulations.

In 2010, he faced Scott Yardley, the Republican nominee and a computer programmer. Waldman campaigned on his legislative experience and accomplishments, while Yardley argued for tort reform and greater states' rights. The Sun-Sentinel endorsed Waldman for re-election, praising him as a "capable lawmaker" whose "experience and knowledge of the issues" gave him the edge over his opponent. Waldman ended up defeating Yardley by a wide margin, winning 61% of the vote to Yardley's 39%.

In 2012, following the reconfiguration of districts, Waldman was drawn into the 96th District, which closely resembled his previous district but no longer stretched out to Pompano Beach. He won the renomination of his party and the general election unopposed.

His continued employment at Keiser University caused a minor controversy in 2010 when it emerged that he solicited information from state education officials "that was of interest to his employer," used the company jet to fly to Tallahassee for his legislative duties, and sponsored legislation that would have benefitted the company, among other institutions. In 2009, he had "sought an ethics opinion on whether his job posed a conflict," and the general counsel for the House concluded that it was "very unlikely" that Waldman's dual roles meant that he would need to abstain from voting.

== Florida Senate ==
Waldman, who was unable to seek another term in the state House in 2014 due to term limits, initially filed to run for the Florida Senate in 2016 to replace State Senator Jeremy Ring, who is also term-limited, in the 29th District. However, the state's Senate districts were redrawn in 2016 following a court case alleging their unconstitutionality, and Waldman instead opted to run in the newly created 34th District, facing trial attorney Gary Farmer in the Democratic primary. He was defeated in the primary election receiving 28.3% of the vote to Farmer's 43.2%.
