= Ron Greenstein =

American politician (born 1951)

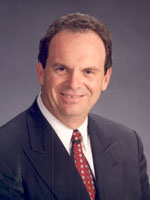

Member of the Florida House of Representatives from the 95th district
- In office November 3, 1998 – November 7, 2006
- Preceded by: Jack N. Tobin
- Succeeded by: Jim Waldman

Personal details
- Born: February 26, 1951 (age 75) New York City, U.S.
- Party: Democratic
- Spouse: Rebecca O'Hara
- Children: Riley, Noah Shane
- Education: Santa Fe Junior College (A.A.); Florida International University (B.A.)

Military service
- Allegiance: United States
- Branch/service: United States Army
- Years of service: 1969–1970

Ron L. Greenstein (born February 26, 1951) is an American politician who served as a member of the Florida House of Representatives from 1998 to 2006. He is a member of the Democratic Party.

== Early life and career ==
Greenstein was born in Brooklyn, and joined the United States Army in 1969, serving until 1970. He attended Santa Fe Junior College, receiving his associate degree in 1970, and then Florida International University, receiving his bachelor's degree in 1974. Greenstein worked as a letter carrier from 1973 to 1978 for the United States Postal Service, and then as an air traffic controller until 1981. He worked as a loan officer for several banks in Broward County.

In 1988, Greenstein ran for the Coconut Creek City Commission in District A, where he faced Patricia Cecere, a journalist and the chairwoman of the city's Parks and Recreation Board. He defeated Cecere and served out the remaining two years of retiring City Commissioner Christine Coble. He was re-elected without opposition in 1990, 1992, 1995, and 1998.

== Florida House of Representatives ==
In 1998, incumbent Democratic State Representative Jack N. Tobin announced that he would not seek re-election, and Greenstein ran to succeed him in the 95th District, which included northern Broward County. He faced former Margate City Commissioner Mitch Anton in the Democratic primary, He defeated Anton by a wide margin, winning 70 percent of the vote, and won the seat outright because no other candidates filed for the race.

Greenstein was re-elected unopposed in 2000. In 2002, after redistricting added Pompano Beach to his district, he was challenged by photographer Mary Beth Jones, the Libertarian nominee. He defeated Jones in a landslide, receiving 81 percent of the vote. Greenstein was re-elected unopposed to his final term in 2004.

In 2006, Greenstein was term-limited and could not run for re-election to a fifth term, and retired from politics.
