= Michael Ferguson (Florida politician) =

American politician

- Official portrait, 2026

Member of the Florida House of Representatives from the 100th district
- Incumbent
- Assumed office November 3, 2026
- Preceded by: Chip LaMarca

Personal details
- Born: Michael Terence Ferguson; March 30, 1994 (age 32) St. Louis, Missouri, U.S.
- Party: Democratic
- Education: Nova Southeastern University (BA, JD)

Military service
- Allegiance: United States
- Branch/service: United States Air Force
- Years of service: 2021–2025
- Rank: Captain
- Unit: Air Force Judge Advocate General's Corps
- Awards: Air and Space Commendation Medal

Michael Terence Ferguson (born March 30, 1994) is an American politician, attorney, and former U.S. Air Force officer serving as a member of the Florida House of Representatives, representing the 100th district in Broward County since 2026.

== Early life and education ==
Michael Terence Ferguson was born on March 30, 1994, in St. Louis, Missouri. He was raised in Lauderdale-by-the-Sea, Florida, and graduated from Cardinal Gibbons High School in Fort Lauderdale, where he played football and lacrosse. He received his bachelor's degree in political science from Nova Southeastern University in 2017, and earned his Juris Doctor from the Shepard Broad College of Law in 2020.

== Career and military service ==
Ferguson served as an active duty officer in the United States Air Force from 2021 to 2025. He served in the Air Force Judge Advocate General's Corps and received numerous decorations during his service, including: Air and Space Commendation Medal, National Defense Service Medal, Global War on Terrorism Expeditionary Medal, and Nuclear Deterrence Operations Service Medal. He retired at the rank of captain.

Ferguson has worked as a trial lawyer at Krupnick Campbell Malone, a law firm founded by Skip Campbell.

== Florida House of Representatives (2026–present) ==
=== 2026 campaign ===
In April 2026, Ferguson announced his candidacy for the 100th district of the Florida House of Representatives, attempting to succeed term-limited Republican incumbent Chip LaMarca. In the 2026 general election, he defeated Republican nominee Yoni Anijar, receiving 52% of the vote in a district President Donald Trump won by 7.8 points in the 2024 presidential election. Ferguson was the first Democrat to win the district "in half a century." His election coincided with 14 other Florida State House seats flipping to the Democratic Party.

=== Tenure ===
On November 17, 2026, Ferguson was formally sworn into office at the Florida State Capitol.

== Electoral history ==
2026 Florida House of Representatives District 100 election
Party	Candidate	Votes	%
Democratic	Michael Ferguson	37,761	52.02
Republican	Yoni Anijar	34,825	47.98
Total votes		72,586	100.0

== Personal life ==
Ferguson lives in Lauderdale-by-the-Sea, Florida. His older brother, Patrick, was elected to the Lauderdale-by-the-Sea Town Commission in 2026.
