= Marty Kiar =

American politician (born 1977)

- Kiar in 2025

Property Appraiser of Broward County
- Incumbent
- Assumed office January 3, 2017
- Preceded by: Lori Nance Parrish

Member of the Broward County Commission from the 1st district
- In office November 20, 2012 – November 22, 2016
- Preceded by: Ilene Lieberman
- Succeeded by: Nan Rich

Member of the Florida House of Representatives from the 97th district
- In office November 21, 2006 – November 20, 2012
- Preceded by: Susan Goldstein
- Succeeded by: Jared Moskowitz

Personal details
- Born: June 19, 1977 (age 49) Pembroke Pines, Florida, U.S.
- Party: Democratic
- Spouse: Kelly Kiar
- Children: Brianne
- Parent(s): Monroe Kiar; Mariann Kiar
- Education: Palm Beach Atlantic University (BA); Nova Southeastern University (JD)
- Profession: Attorney

Martin David Kiar (born June 19, 1977) is an American politician and attorney who has served as Property Appraiser of Broward County, Florida since 2017. A member of the Democratic Party, he previously served as a Broward County Commissioner from 2012 to 2016, and as a member of the Florida House of Representatives from 2006 to 2012, representing the 97th District.

== History ==
Kiar was born in Pembroke Pines on June 19, 1977 to Monroe and Mariann Kiar. His mother was a school principal. His father was a former Councilmember and Mayor of the Town of Davie. His brother, Marc Kiar, is a school teacher and athletic director in Broward County. His sister, Casey Kiar Lee, is a business woman and community activist in Broward County. Martin Kiar graduated from Western High School. He then attended Palm Beach Atlantic University, receiving his bachelor's degree in 1999, and then the Shepard Broad Law Center, the law school of Nova Southeastern University, receiving his Juris Doctor and graduating magna cum laude in 2002. Upon graduation, he worked as an Assistant Town Attorney and Assistant Municipal Prosecutor for Davie. Kiar was also appointed to the Town of Davie School of Advisory Board, Broward County Housing and Finance Authority, and the Town of Davie Airport Advisory Board.

== Florida House of Representatives ==
In 2004, when incumbent State Representative Nan Rich could not seek another term due to term limits, Kiar ran to succeed her in the 97th District, which included Coconut Creek, Davie, and Weston in western Broward County. He faced Weston City Commissioner Barbara Herrera-Hill in the Democratic primary, and campaigned on providing seniors with assistance for purchasing prescription drugs and reforming the Florida Comprehensive Assessment Test. He was endorsed by the Sun-Sentinel over Herrera-Hill, which praised his "history of public service" and "energy and enthusiasm." Ultimately, however, Herrera-Hill defeated Kiar, winning 53% of the vote to his 47%.

Official portrait of then-Representative Marty Kiar, November 2006.

Herrera-Hill ended up losing to Republican nominee Susan Goldstein, so when Goldstein ran for re-election in 2006, Kiar ran against her. He faced executive recruiter Walter Birch in the Democratic primary, and campaigned on increasing access to health insurance for low-income individuals, improving public education, providing working families with affordable housing, and shutting down the Citizens Property Insurance Corporation, which Kiar called a "mess" plagued with corruption. Kiar comfortably won the primary with 64% of the vote, and advanced to the general election. He was supported by Michael Schiavo, the wife of Terri Schiavo, who was kept on life support while her husband wished to allow her to die when a number of state politicians got involved. He criticized Susan Goldstein for supporting intervention in the case, declaring, "Susan Goldstein decided she knew what was best for me and my family. [She] should apologize not just to me but the people who voted for her." During the campaign, Kiar was criticized for accepting campaign contributions from Chris Kovanes, a former Davie Town Administrator who was accused of embezzling hundreds of thousands of dollars, which Kiar called "despicable." Kiar advocated for the creation of a publicly elected state insurance commissioner to reform home insurance, the enaction of property tax breaks for "first-time homebuyers and public servants such as teachers, firefighters, and police officers," and the preservation of the state's Class Size Amendment. In the end, Kiar narrowly defeated Goldstein, unseating her with 53% of the vote.

When he ran for re-election in 2008, he was opposed by Todd Goberville, a salesman and the former Chairman of the Florida Federation of Young Republicans. Goberville attacked Kiar for ineffectiveness in the legislature while Kiar criticized Goberville for opposing stem cell research and supporting school vouchers. He received the endorsement of the Sun-Sentinel in his campaign, which praised him for being "sincere, if not overly idealistic" and argued that "he deserves the chance to be a fence mender" in the legislature. Ultimately, Kiar ended up defeating Goberville handily, winning re-election with 58% of the vote. In 2010, he was re-elected to his third and final term in the legislature without opposition.

== Broward County Commission ==
In 2012, rather than seek re-election to the legislature, Kiar instead opted to run for the Broward County Commission from the 1st District, which includes Davie, Lauderhill, Plantation, Sunrise, Tamarac, and Weston in western Broward County. Though he was initially opposed by a number of candidates, all of them dropped out, and he won election to the County Commission entirely unopposed.

== Broward County Property Appraiser ==
Marty took office as the Broward County Property Appraiser on January 3, 2017 having been elected unopposed in 2016.

Florida House of Representatives
Preceded by Susan Goldstein	Member of the Florida House of Representatives from the 80th district November 21, 2006–November 20, 2012	Succeeded by Jared Moskowitz
