= Chip LaMarca =

American politician (born 1968)

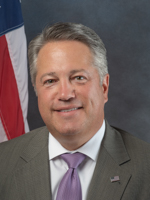

Member of the Florida House of Representatives
- In office November 6, 2018 – November 3, 2026
- Preceded by: George Moraitis
- Succeeded by: Michael Ferguson
- Constituency: 93rd district (2018–2022); 100th district (2022–2026)

Member of the Broward County Commission from the 4th district
- In office November 2010 – November 6, 2018
- Preceded by: Ken Keechl
- Succeeded by: Lamar Fisher

Personal details
- Born: March 16, 1968 (age 58) Winchester, Massachusetts, U.S.
- Party: Republican
- Spouse: Eileen LaMarca
- Education: Broward College (AA); Florida Atlantic University; Boston University

Chip LaMarca is an American politician who was a Republican member of the Florida Legislature representing the state's 100th House District, which includes part of Broward County, from 2018 to 2026. In 2010, LaMarca unseated incumbent Broward County Commissioner Ken Keechl. In 2014, LaMarca beat Keechl in a rematch. LaMarca spent eight years on the county commission and was the sole Republican elected on the board.

== History ==
A native of Winchester, Massachusetts, LaMarca moved to Florida in 1971. Prior to his election to the Florida House of Representatives, LaMarca served on the Lighthouse Point City Commission and the Broward County Commission.

LaMarca owns and operates LaMarca Construction Corporation, a construction group specializing in turnkey power generation and fuel systems, with a professional history in environmental systems, concentrating in groundwater and soil remediation.

== Florida House of Representatives ==
In 2018, LaMarca decided to run for the open state house seat in Northeast Broward County, House District 93. He was unopposed in the primary and was elected to the Florida House of Representatives in the November 6, 2018 general election, defeating Democrat Emma Collum and a third candidate, Kelly Milam with 52.78% of the vote.

=== 2021–2022 Committee assignments ===
- Joint Committee on Public Counsel Oversight (Alternating Chair)
- Tourism, Infrastructure & Energy Subcommittee (Vice Chair)
- Early Learning & Elementary Education Subcommittee
- Education & Employment Committee
- Environment, Agriculture & Flooding Subcommittee
- Infrastructure & Tourism Appropriations Subcommittee

== Election history ==
2022 Florida House of Representatives District 100
Party	Candidate	Votes	%
Republican	Chip LaMarca	42,656	57.13
Democratic	Linda Thompson Gonzalez	32,003	42.87
Republican hold			

2020 Florida House of Representatives District 93
Party	Candidate	Votes	%
Republican	Chip LaMarca	54,593	55.24
Democratic	Linda Thompson Gonzalez	44,239	44.76
Republican hold			

2018 Florida House of Representatives District 93
Party	Candidate	Votes	%
Republican	Chip LaMarca	40,551	52.78
Democratic	Emma Collum	35,098	45.68
Independent	Nancy Milam	1,179	1.53
Republican hold			

2014 Broward County Commission District 4
Party	Candidate	Votes	%
Republican	Chip LaMarca	28,331	52.87
Democratic	Ken Keechl	25,253	47.13
Republican hold			

2010 Broward County Commission District 4
Party	Candidate	Votes	%
Republican	Chip LaMarca	26,168	49.80
Democratic	Ken Keechl	23,657	45.02
Independent	Chris Chiari	2,718	5.17
Republican gain from Democratic			

2005 Lighthouse Point City Commission Seat 4
Party	Candidate	Votes	%
Nonpartisan	Chip LaMarca	1,860	71.16
Nonpartisan	Meredith Chaiken-Weiss	514	19.66
Nonpartisan	Nick Louis	240	9.18
