= Leland Rayson =

American politician

Member of the Illinois House of Representatives

Personal details
- Born: August 23, 1921 Oak Park, Illinois
- Died: January 8, 2001 (aged 79) Stuart, Florida
- Party: Democratic

Leland Homer Rayson (August 23, 1921 – January 8, 2001) was an American lawyer and politician.

Rayson was born in Oak Park, Illinois. He received his bachelor's degree from University of Rochester and his law degree from Northwestern University Pritzker School of Law. Rayson served in the United States Navy during World War II. Rayson was admitted to the Illinois bar. He was also involved in the real estate business and was the editor of the North-Worth Reporter. Rayson lived in Tinley Park, Illinois with his wife and family. He served on the local school. Rayson served in the Illinois House of Representatives from 1965 to 1977 and was a Democrat. Rayson and his wife moved to Port St. Lucie, Florida in 1988. Rayson died from cancer at Martin memorial Hospital in Stuart, Florida.

His son John Rayson is a lawyer and has served in the Florida Legislature.
