= Florida's 96th House of Representatives district =

Florida district

Florida's 96th State House of Representatives district
Representative
Dan Daley; D–Coral Springs

Florida's 96th House of Representatives district elects one member of the Florida House of Representatives. It contains parts of Broward County.

== Members ==
- Dan Daley (since 2022)
