= Lamar Fisher =

American politician

Lamar P. Fisher
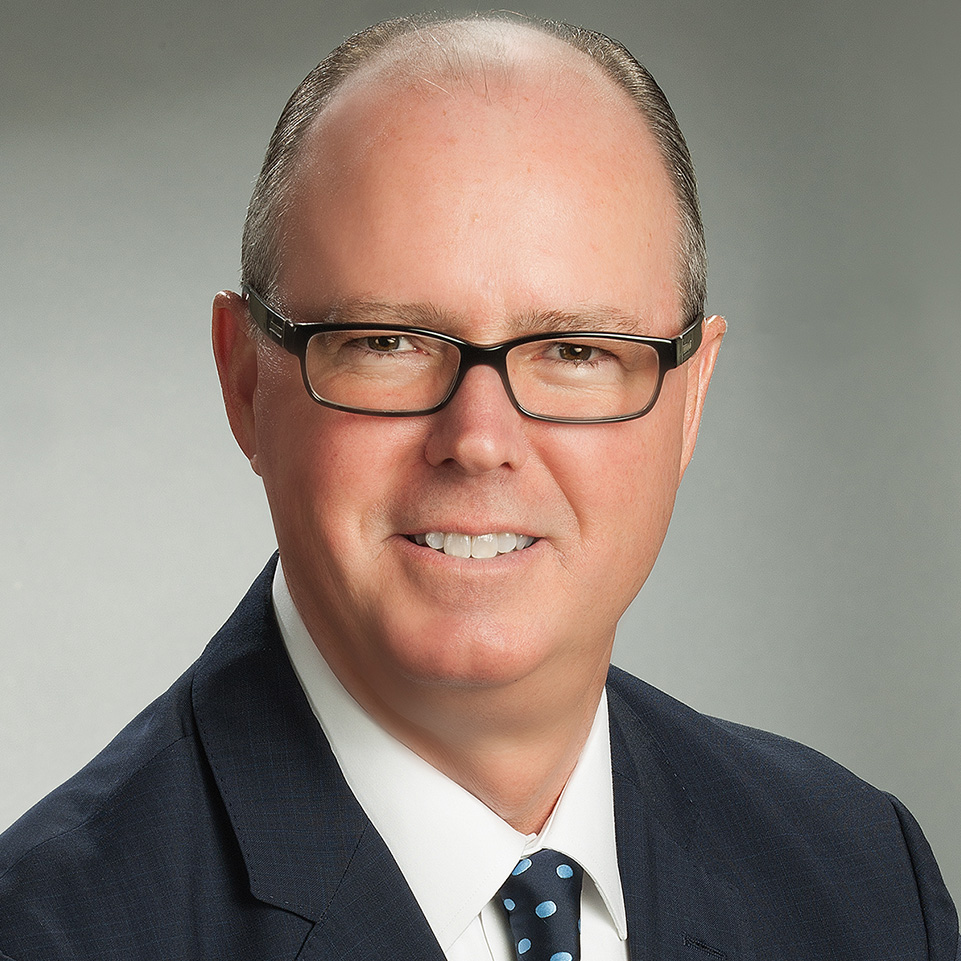
- Fisher's portrait

Member of the Broward County Commission from the 4th district
- Incumbent
- Assumed office November 2018
- Preceded by: Chip LaMarca

Mayor of Pompano Beach
- In office March 2007 – November 2018
- Preceded by: John Rayson
- Succeeded by: Rex Hardin

Personal details
- Born: Lamar P. Fisher
- Party: Democratic
- Profession: Auctioneer

Lamar P. Fisher is an American politician who is a former Mayor of Pompano Beach, Florida, serving from March 2007 until November 2018.

Fisher was elected Mayor of Pompano Beach in 2007, running unopposed. In November 2018, Fisher was elected to the Broward County Commission. He was opposed in his election by Republican candidate Shari McCartney.

Fisher is also the CEO and President of Fisher Auction Company.
