= Florida's 97th House of Representatives district =

Florida district

Florida's 97th State House of Representatives district
Representative
Lisa Dunkley; D–Sunrise

Florida's 97th House of Representatives district elects one member of the Florida House of Representatives. It contains parts of Broward County.

== Members ==
- Susan Goldstein (until 2006)
- Marty Kiar (2006–2012)
- Jared Moskowitz (2012–2019)
- Dan Daley (2019–2022)
- Lisa Dunkley (since 2022)
