= Barrington Russell =

American politician

Member of the Florida House of Representatives from the 95th district
- In office November 8, 2016 – November 7, 2018
- Preceded by: Hazelle P. Rogers
- Succeeded by: Anika Omphroy

Personal details
- Born: March 2, 1958 (age 68) Jamaica
- Party: Democratic

Barrington Russell (born March 2, 1958) is an American politician who served in the Florida House of Representatives from the 95th district from 2016 to 2018.
