= Stacy Ritter =

American politician (born 1960)

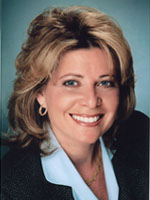

Member of the Florida House of Representatives from the 96th district
- In office November 19, 1996 – November 16, 2004
- Preceded by: Benjamin Graber
- Succeeded by: Ari Porth

Personal details
- Born: June 8, 1960 (age 66) Washington, D.C.
- Party: Democratic
- Spouse: Russ Klenet
- Children: Matt, Scott, Stephanie
- Education: Rollins College (B.A.); Shepard Broad Law Center (J.D.)
- Profession: Attorney

Stacy Ritter (born June 8, 1960) is a Democratic politician who currently serves as president and CEO of the Greater Fort Lauderdale Convention & Visitors Bureau. Previously, she served as a Broward County Commissioner, representing the 3rd District from 2006 to the present. Prior to being elected to the Broward County Commission, Ritter served as a member of the Florida House of Representatives from 1996 to 2004, representing the 96th District.

== History ==
Ritter was born in Washington, D.C., and moved to the state of Florida in 1974. She graduated from Piper High School, and later attended Rollins College, receiving her bachelor's degree in history in 1982, and Shepard Broad Law Center, the law school at Nova Southeastern University, receiving her Juris Doctor in 1985. Ritter worked as an attorney in private practice, specializing in probate work, and volunteered as a lobbyist with the National Council of Jewish Women, helping to convince then-Governor Lawton Chiles to veto a school prayer bill.

== Florida House of Representatives ==
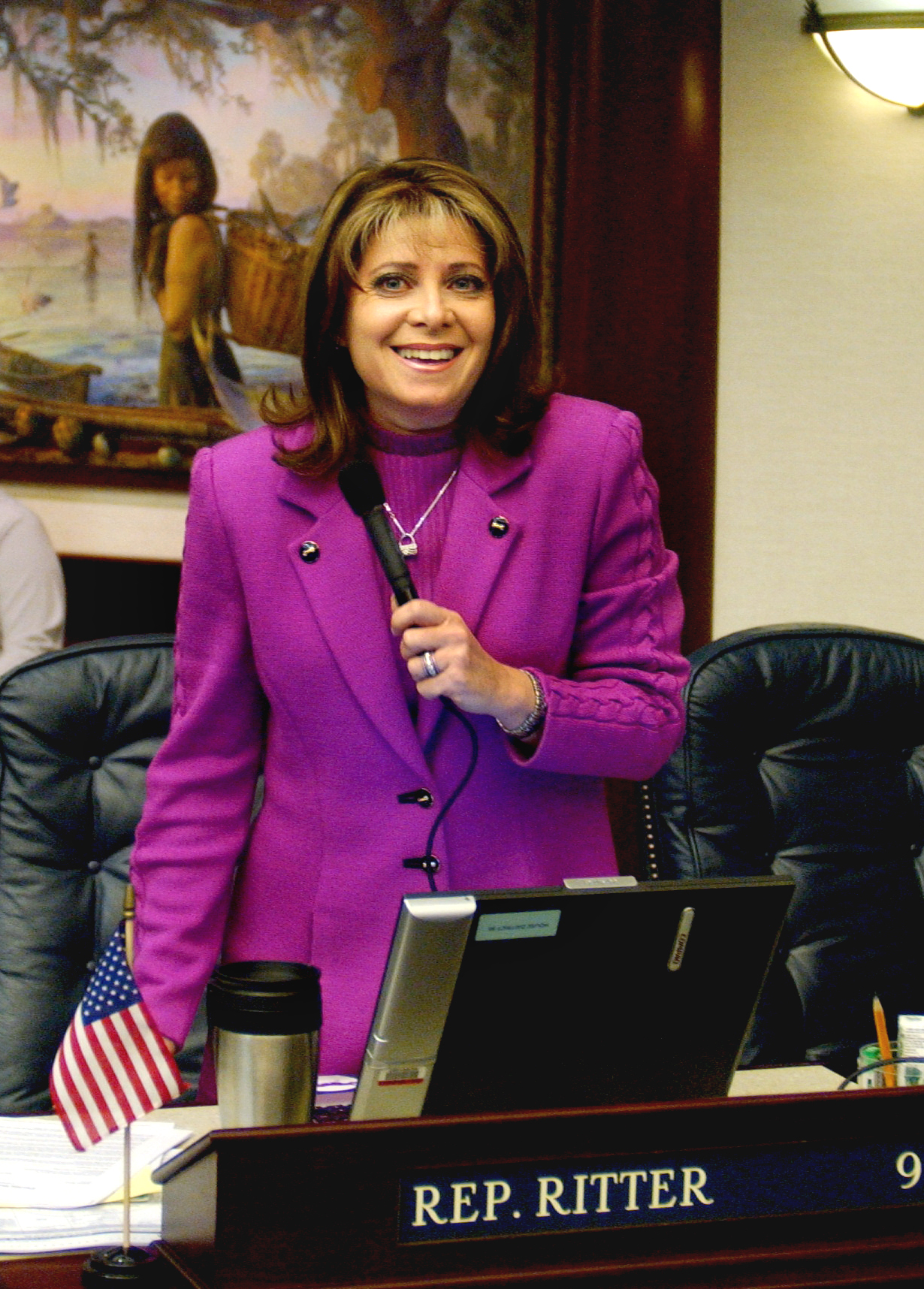
Ritter comments on a matter of personal privilege to her colleagues on the Florid House floor in 2004

In 1996, when incumbent State Representative Benjamin Graber declined to seek another term in the legislature to instead run for Congress, Ritter ran to succeed him in the 96th District. She faced Broward County School Board Member Karen Dickerhoof in the Democratic primary, and campaigned on a "fresh approach," which meant using in-line skates to go door-to-door within the district. She sold herself as a "political outsider" and criticized Dickerhoof for being "too close to Broward's political power brokers" while supporting "educational alternatives to reduce juvenile crime and strong growth management across [the county]." Ultimately, Ritter defeated Dickerhoof by a wide margin, winning 57% of the vote, and advanced to the general election, where she was opposed by Linda Blake, the Republican nominee. Once again, Ritter campaigned on reducing juvenile crime and controlling growth and emphasized her support for abortion rights. Ultimately, owing to the partisan breakdown of the district, Ritter defeated Blake in a landslide with 61% of the vote.

When she ran for re-election in 1998, Ritter defeated her opponent, Republican nominee Kevin Norton, in a rout, winning 71% of the vote. She repeated her success in 2000, dispatching Republican Joe Kaufman with 68% of the vote. When she sought her final term in the legislature in 2002, she was opposed only by Libertarian nominee Roger Eckert, and won in yet another landslide, scoring 84% of the vote.

== Broward County Commission ==
When Broward County Commissioner Benjamin Graber resigned from the county commission to run for the State Senate, a special election was held to replace him in the 1st District, and Ritter ran to succeed him. She won the Democratic primary unopposed, and faced John Irving Halpern, the Republican nominee, in the general election. Ritter campaigned on using casinos and gambling to replace property taxes as sources of revenue for the county; consolidating services in the engineering, finance, accounting, and legal departments at Fort Lauderdale-Hollywood International Airport and Port Everglades; and promoting programs that assist minority-owned businesses. She ended up defeating Halpern in a landslide, winning 71% of the vote. In 2008, during the next regularly scheduled general election, Ritter was re-elected to the County Commission without opposition. Ritter was accused of violating campaign finance law in 2010 by accepting campaign contributions without reporting and for using campaign funds to pay for personal expenses during her 2008 campaign. She admitted "sloppy bookkeeping," but denied that she violated or intended to violate campaign finance laws, and in 2011, the Florida Elections Commission dropped most of the charges.

In 2012, Ritter ran for re-election, and was opposed by Robert Sutton, the Republican nominee and a high school math teacher. Sutton attacked Ritter over her alleged ethical issues while Ritter campaigned on her successes in starting major construction projects in the county, including the building of another runway at the Fort Lauderdale-Hollywood International Airport, a new county courthouse, and installations at Port Everglades. Ritter ended up defeating Sutton in a landslide, winning re-election with 67% of the vote.

In May 2016, Ritter was appointed president of the Greater Fort Lauderdale Convention & Visitors Bureau, despite objections from the county's Tourist Development Council.
