= Hazelle P. Rogers =

American politician (born 1952)

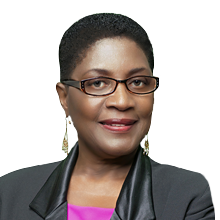

Member of the Broward County Commission from the 9th district
- Incumbent
- Assumed office November 29, 2022
- Preceded by: Dale Holness

Member of the Florida House of Representatives
- In office November 4, 2008 – November 8, 2016
- Preceded by: Matthew Meadows
- Succeeded by: Barrington Russell
- Constituency: 94th district (2008–2012); 95th district (2012–2016)

Personal details
- Born: September 28, 1952 (age 74) Kingston, British Jamaica
- Party: Democratic
- Education: New York City Community College (AAS); University of Phoenix (B.S.)
- Profession: Real estate consultant

Hazelle P. Rogers (born September 28, 1952) is a Democratic member of the Broward County Commission. She was a Democratic member of the Florida House of Representatives and was the Mayor of Lauderdale Lakes. She formerly represented the 95th District, which includes North Lauderdale, Lauderdale Lakes, and Lauderhill in northern Broward County, from 2012 to 2016, previously representing the 94th District from 2008 to 2012, before redistricting took place. She won an election to the Broward County Commission on August 23, 2022. She was sworn into this position in November 2022.

== History ==
Rogers was born in Kingston, Jamaica, and moved to New York City in 1969 as a 17 year-old. Rogers attended New York City Community College, where she graduated with an associate degree in 1976. She attended Pace University in 1980, but did not graduate. In 1982, Rogers relocated to the state of Florida, where she became the Secretary of the Eastgate Homeowners Association.

Rogers was elected to the Lauderdale Lakes City Commission in 1996, where she served until she was elected to the legislature. While serving on the City Commission, Rogers graduated from the University of Phoenix with a degree in business in 2003.

== Florida House of Representatives ==
When incumbent State Representative Matthew Meadows, was unable to seek re-election in 2008 due to term limits, she ran to succeed him in the 94th District, which ran from Broward Estates to North Lauderdale in Broward County. In the Democratic primary, Rogers faced Eric Hammond, Kenneth Thurston, Roshawn Banks, Robert Lynch, and Rubin Young. She campaigned on "curbing rising property taxes" and on providing affordable housing to the community. Rogers emerged victorious in the primary, winning 39% of the vote to Hammond's 27%, Thurston's 21%, Banks's 5%, Lynch's 5%, and Young's 3%.

She won the general election unopposed. When she ran for re-election in 2010, she was challenged in the Democratic primary by John Labriola, who campaigned on outlawing abortion and same-sex marriage, arguing that the party had become too liberal, saying, "We need to get our moral house in order if we ever hope to fix the economy and get America prosperous again." She defeated Labriola easily with 88% of the vote, advancing to the general election, where she was once again elected unopposed.

While serving in the legislature in 2011, Rogers authored legislation with State Senator Gary Siplin that required school districts to "adopt a dress code that prohibits students from 'wearing clothing that exposes underwear or body parts in an indecent or vulgar manner,'" calling it a "pro-family, pro-education, pro-jobs bill" that would "make for a better school district and more productive students."

In 2012, when state legislative districts were redrawn, Rogers was moved into the 95th District, which included much of the territory that she had previously represented in the 94th District. She won both the primary and general election entirely unopposed.

== Broward County Commission ==
Rogers joined the Broward County Commission in 2022, after winning the seat formerly held by Dale Holness, in an August 2022 election.

== Recognition ==
In 2020, Rogers received the Order of Distinction from the government of Jamaica.
