= John Rayson =

American politician

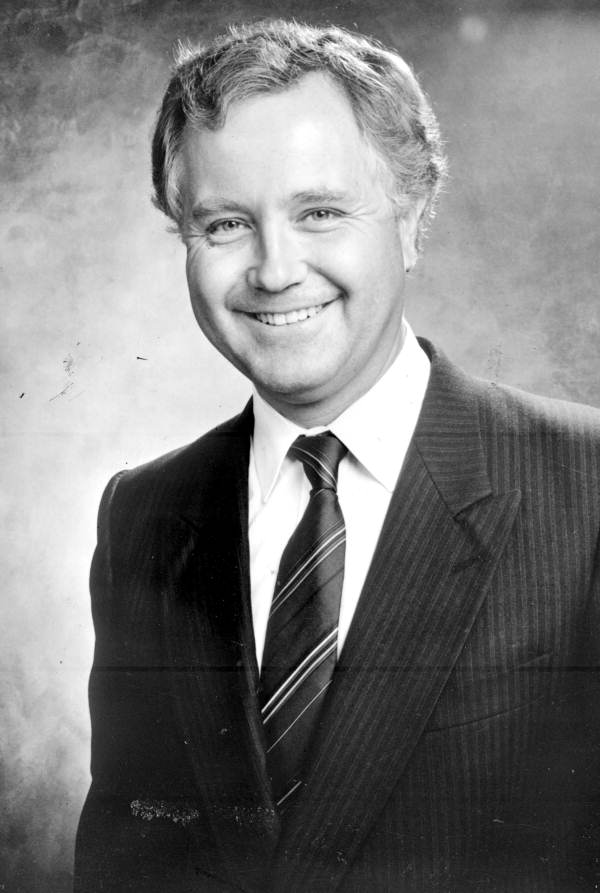

Mayor of Pompano Beach
- In office 2004–2007
- Succeeded by: Lamar Fisher

Member of the Florida House of Representatives
- In office November 6, 1990 – November 7, 2000
- Preceded by: Robert Shelley
- Succeeded by: Mark Weissman
- Constituency: 92nd district (1990–1992); 90th district (1992–2000)

Personal details
- Born: March 29, 1949 (age 77) Oak Park, Illinois, U.S.
- Party: Democratic
- Children: Jessica, Chloe, Robert, Bradley
- Relatives: Leland Rayson (father)
- Education: University of Rochester (B.A.); Case Western Reserve University School of Law (J.D.)
- Occupation: Attorney

John C. Rayson (born March 29, 1949, in Oak Park, Illinois) is a Broward County, Florida attorney. He served as the mayor of Pompano Beach, Florida from 2004 to 2007. Prior to becoming mayor, Rayson served as a member of the Florida House of Representatives from 1990 to 2000.

He unsuccessfully sought election as a Broward County, Florida circuit judge.

On July 26, 2007, he was selected as Davie, Florida's town attorney.

Rayson was born in Oak Park, Illinois. His father Leland Rayson served in the Illinois House of Representatives. Rayson received his bachelor's degree from University of Rochester in 1971 and his law degree from Case Western Reserve University in 1974. Rayson was admitted to the Florida bar and is a Democrat.
