= Florida's 100th House of Representatives district =

Florida district

Florida's 100th State House of Representatives district
Representative
Michael Ferguson; D–Lauderdale-by-the-Sea

Florida's 100th House of Representatives district elects one member of the Florida House of Representatives. It contains parts of Broward County, including: Deerfield Beach, Lighthouse Point, Hillsboro Beach, Pompano Beach, Sea Ranch Lakes, Lauderdale-by-the-Sea, and Fort Lauderdale.

== Members ==
- Chip LaMarca (2022–2026)
- Michael Ferguson (2026–present)
