= Florida's 95th House of Representatives district =

Florida district

Florida's 95th State House of Representatives district
Representative
Christine Hunschofsky; D–Parkland

Florida's 95th House of Representatives district elects one member of the Florida House of Representatives. It contains parts of Broward County.

== Members ==
- Hazelle P. Rogers (2012–2016)
- Barrington Russell (2016–2018)
- Anika Omphroy (2018–2022)
- Christine Hunschofsky (since 2022)
