= Dan Daley =

American politician

Daniel Patrick Daley

Member of the Florida House of Representatives
- Incumbent
- Assumed office June 18, 2019
- Preceded by: Jared Moskowitz
- Constituency: 97th district (2019–2022); 96th district (2022–present)

City Commissioner of Coral Springs
- In office 2012–2019

Vice Mayor of Coral Springs
- In office 2015–2017

Personal details
- Born: Huntington, New York, U.S.
- Party: Democratic
- Education: Florida State University; Nova Southeastern University

Dan Daley is an American politician. He is a Democrat representing the 96th district in the Florida House of Representatives. Previously, he served as a city commissioner and vice mayor of Coral Springs, FL.

== Education ==
Daley earned a BS in subjects like Political Science and Criminology from Florida State University in 2010, and JD from Shepard Broad Law Center at Nova Southeastern University in 2015.

== Political career ==
Daley served as a city commissioner in Coral Springs, FL from 2012 to 2019, and also as vice mayor from 2015 to 2017.

In 2019, he was the only candidate to qualify for the special election to replace Jared Moskowitz as the Florida state representative for the 97th district. He had been endorsed by Moskowitz and Congressman Ted Deutch, among others.

Daley sits on the following House subcommittees:

- Local Administration
- Transportation & Tourism Appropriations
- Workforce Development & Tourism

On April 21, 2022, Daley attempted to stage a sit-in demonstration to prevent a vote on Florida's congressional district maps. Opponents of the tactic compared his actions to an insurrection. The demonstration was ultimately unsuccessful.

In 2025, Daley sponsored HB 479 to strengthen penalties for drivers who leave the scene of crashes involving property damage The bill mandates that offenders provide restitution to affected parties, emphasizing accountability.

In November 2026, Daley announced his candidacy for the 37th district of the Florida Senate in 2028.
