= Eleanor Sobel =

American Politician

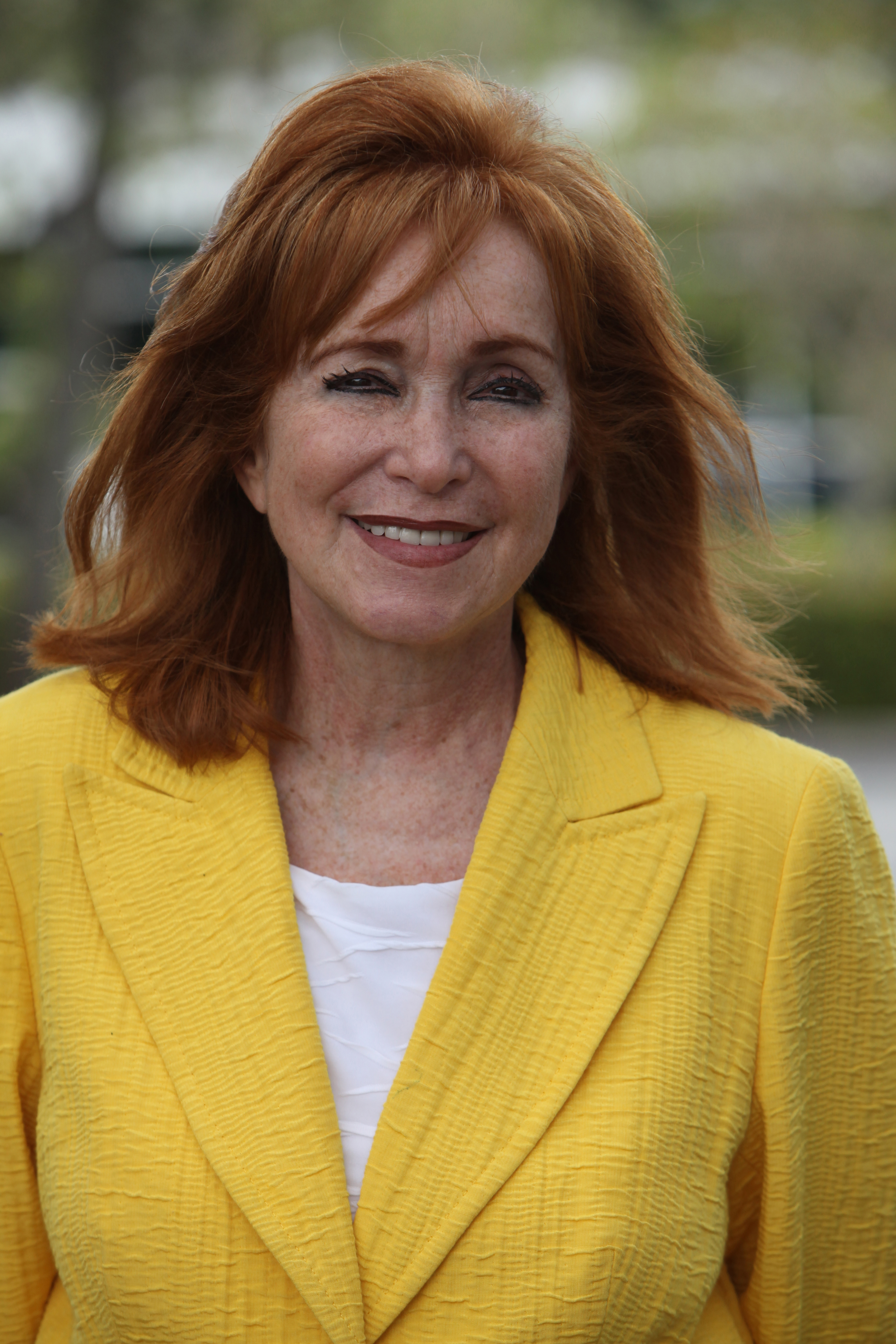

Member of the Florida Senate
- In office November 4, 2008 – November 8, 2016
- Preceded by: Steven Geller
- Succeeded by: Perry Thurston (redistricting)
- Constituency: 31st district (2008–2012); 33rd district (2012–2016)

Member of the Florida House of Representatives
- In office November 3, 1998 – November 7, 2006
- Preceded by: Fred Lippman
- Succeeded by: Elaine Schwartz
- Constituency: 100th district (1998–2002); 99th district (2002–2006)

Personal details
- Party: Democratic
- Spouse: Dr. Stuart Sobel
- Education: Brooklyn College (BA); City University of New York (MA); Columbia University (MA)
- Profession: Teacher and community activist

Eleanor Sobel (born February 11, 1946) is a Democratic former member of the Florida State Senate. Sobel representing the 33rd District, which includes Davie, Hallandale Beach, Hollywood, and Pembroke Pines in southeastern Broward County, from 2012 to 2016, having previously represented the 31st District from 2008 to 2012. Before winning election to the Florida Senate, Sobel served as a member of the Florida House of Representatives, representing the 100th District from 1998 to 2002 and the 99th District from 2002 to 2006.

== History ==
Sobel was born in Brooklyn, New York, and attended Brooklyn College, graduating with a degree in history in 1967. She then attended the City University of New York, where she received a master's degree in social studies education in 1968, and Columbia University, receiving a master's degree in learning disabilities in 1975.

In 1976, Sobel moved to Florida, where she worked as a school teacher and a community activist, working on the campaigns of mayoral candidate Mara Giulanti and City Commission candidate Kenneth Gottlieb, who would later go on to serve in the Florida House of Representatives with Sobel. When Suzanne Gunzburger resigned from the Hollywood City Commission following her election to the Broward County Commission, Sobel's unique approach through more than 1,000 signatures supporting her appointment was a first time approach to an open appointed seat and was elected by the City Commission to replace Gunzburger on November 20, 1992.

Sobel served as Vice Mayor of Hollywood from 1996 to 1997. Until 1998, she served on the City Commission when she was narrowly defeated for re-election by former Mayor Sal Oliveri by just 139 votes. In light of her defeat, she remarked, "I look out there and I see people who have worked together, a city that has moved forward in four years. We tried our best. These things happen."

== Florida House of Representatives ==
When incumbent State Representative Fred Lippman declined to seek another term in 1998, Sobel ran to succeed him in the 100th District, which included Hallandale Beach and Hollywood in southern Broward County. She faced Arthur Palamara, Mike Mallor, and Doria Bonham-Yeaman in the Democratic primary, which also served as the general election because no other candidates filed, and a contentious election, largely between Sobel and Palamara, soon followed. Sobel campaigned on reducing class sizes, providing funding for pre-school programs, reforming HMO practices, providing health care for the working poor, and reducing crime by increasing victims' rights and expanding after-school programs and neighborhood crime watch organizations. In the end, Sobel defeated her opponents to win her party's nomination, receiving 53% of the vote to Palamara's 42%, Bonham-Yeaman's 3%, and Mallor's 2%. Running for re-election in 2000, she faced Eric Spivey, the Republican nominee and a former insurance executive. Sobel was endorsed for re-election by the Sun-Sentinel, which praised her "lengthy experience in public office" and for doing a "decent job of representing her district," concluding, "[S]he deserves the opportunity to gain more experience and seniority in the state Legislature." Spivey did not prove to be a serious challenge for Sobel, and she won re-election in a landslide, receiving 73% of the vote to Spivey's 27%. She was re-elected without opposition in 2002 and 2004, and could not seek another term in 2006 due to term limits.

== Broward County School Board ==
In 2006, when Sobel could not seek another term in the legislature due to term limits, she instead opted to run for an open seat on the Broward County School Board. In a nonpartisan election, she faced Terry Snipes, a teacher, and Mac McElyea, the former Mayor of Dania Beach, and campaigned on leading a nationwide search for a superintendent, "implementing the class-size amendment, improving the dropout rate in high schools and hiring a nurse for every school." Once again, Sobel was endorsed by the Sun-Sentinel, which declared, "Eleanor Sobel is the best of three candidates for the job," citing her experience in the legislature. She ended up winning by a wide margin, receiving 51% of the vote to McElyea's 25% and Snipes's 24%.

== Florida Senate ==
When State Senator Steven Geller was unable to seek re-election, Sobel ran to succeed him in the 31st District, which was based in Broward County, and submitted her resignation from the School Board. She faced former State Representatives Kenneth Gottlieb and Tim Ryan in the Democratic primary, and the Sun-Sentinel remarked that all three candidates were "cut-from-the-same-cloth" who "compiled similar voting records and took similar positions on issues." Despite that, however, they endorsed Ryan in what they called "a tough choice. Ultimately, Sobel won narrowly over her opponents, receiving 36% of the vote to Gottlieb's 34% and Ryan's 31%, and advanced to the general election, where she received nearly 100% of the vote against only write-in opposition.

When the state's legislative districts were redrawn in 2012, Sobel ran for re-election in the newly created 33rd District, which contained much of the territory that she had previously represented. She won the Democratic primary uncontested, and faced Juan Selaya, the Republican nominee, in the general election. The Sun-Sentinel endorsed her for re-election, calling her "a strong voice in Tallahassee for education, health care issues and senior citizens' services." Sobel ended up defeating Selaya with 67% of the vote.

Sobel served as a champion for elderly reform through improving the practices and procedures for assisted living facilities (ALF). The bill passed in 2015.

Under the leadership of Senator Sobel, Chair of the Senate Committee of Children, Families, and Elder Affairs, significantly advanced help for people with mental health and substance abuse issues through greater access to services.

Sobel was also a strong proponent of the Affordable Health Care Act.

Sobel is a strong advocate for LGBT rights and honored the 6 couples that challenged Florida's same sex marriage ban by awarding them with the award and married the couples in her office.

In 2016, Governor Rick Scott signed [Senate Bill 716] into law which Sobel had sponsored. The bill establishes a Holocaust Memorial in Tallahassee at the State Capitol.

Sobel is a strong advocate for animal rights and protections especially greyhounds. She successfully passed the Victoria Q. Gaetz Greyhound Protection Act in the Florida Senate that would report greyhound injuries (current law limits reporting of deaths) but the bill died in the Florida House of Representatives.

In 2016, the New Times of Broward and Palm Beach named Senator Eleanor Sobel as their Best politician of 2016.

Also in 2016, Sobel sponsored SB498, which decriminalized co-habitation by removing the prohibition against unmarried couples living together (FSS 798.02).

=== Committee assignments ===
- Children, Families, and Elder Affairs (Chair)
- Select Committee On Patient Protection and Affordable Care Act (Vice Chair)
- Ethics and Elections (Vice Chair)
- Health Policy (Vice Chair)
- Appropriations Subcommittee on Health and Human Services
- Appropriations on Transportation, Tourism, and Economic Development

== 2016 Hollywood mayoral campaign ==
On December 4, 2015, Sobel announced that she would run for Mayor of Hollywood in 2016, confirming speculation that began shortly after Mayor Peter Bober announced he would not seek re-election.

== 2017 ==
Sobel currently contributes to the Sun Sentinel South Florida 100 influential leaders opinion panel on issues of importance.

Florida House of Representatives
Preceded by Fred Lippman	Member of the Florida House of Representatives from the 100th district November 3, 1998–November 5, 2002	Succeeded by Tim Ryan
Preceded by Tim Ryan	Member of the Florida House of Representatives from the 99th district November 5, 2002–November 7, 2006	Succeeded by Elaine Schwartz
Florida Senate
Preceded by Steven Geller	Member of the Florida Senate from the 31st district November 4, 2008–November 6, 2012	Succeeded by Chris Smith
Preceded by Oscar Braynon	Member of the Florida Senate from the 33rd district November 6, 2012–November 8, 2016	Succeeded by Perry Thurston
