= Tim Ryan (Florida politician) =

American politician (born 1956)

Tim M. Ryan
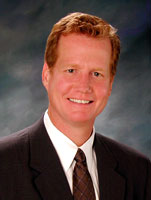

Member of the Broward County Commission from the 7th district
- Incumbent
- Assumed office November 2012

Member of the Florida House of Representatives from the 100th district
- In office November 19, 2002 – November 21, 2006
- Preceded by: Eleanor Sobel
- Succeeded by: Evan Jenne

Member of the Florida House of Representatives from the 99th district
- In office November 17, 1998 – November 19, 2002
- Preceded by: Annie Mackenzie
- Succeeded by: Eleanor Sobel

Mayor of Broward County
- In office November 18, 2014 – November 17, 2015
- Vice Mayor: Marty Kiar
- Preceded by: Barbara Sharief
- Succeeded by: Martin David Kiar

Personal details
- Born: Timothy M. Ryan; February 7, 1956 (age 70) Fort Lauderdale, Florida, U.S.
- Party: Democratic
- Spouse: Debra Lynn "Debbie" Miller
- Children: Johanna, Brendan, Colman, Catriona
- Education: University of Florida (BS); Fredric G. Levin College of Law (JD)
- Profession: Attorney

Timothy M. Ryan (born February 7, 1956) is an American attorney and Democratic politician who currently serves as a Broward County Commissioner, representing the 7th District from 2012 to the present. Prior to being elected to the Broward County Commission, Ryan served as a member of the Florida House of Representatives from 1998 to 2006, representing the 99th District from 1998 to 2002, and the 100th District from 2002 to 2006.

== History ==
Ryan was born in Fort Lauderdale, Florida, in 1956, and attended Chaminade High School, graduating in 1974. After high school, he attended the University of Florida, receiving his bachelor's degree in economics in 1978, and receiving his Juris Doctor from the Fredric G. Levin College of Law in 1981. After graduation, he joined the law office of Ryan & Ryan, which his father founded, and worked as a city attorney for Dania Beach, Florida.

== Florida House of Representatives ==
In 2010, incumbent State Representative Annie Mackenzie was unable to seek re-election due to term limits, so Ryan ran to succeed her in the 99th District. In the Democratic primary, he faced Patti Webster, Kenneth Cooper, Bobbie Grace, and J. T. MacKenzie, and he campaigned on increasing access to healthcare for lower-income children, reducing recidivism for juvenile criminal offenders, and reducing statewide class sizes. Because only Democrats filed for the seat, the primary was open, and Ryan and Webster both received 32% of the vote. Because no candidate received a majority, a runoff election was held between Ryan and Webster. During the campaign, Webster attacked Ryan for receiving contributions from the sugar industry, though he claimed that he had not solicited the contributions. Ultimately, Ryan defeated Webster, receiving 55% of the vote to Webster's 45%. He was re-elected without opposition in 2000.

In 2002, following the reconfiguration of the state's legislative districts, Ryan was drawn into the 100th District, which included most of the territory that he had previously represented. He was re-elected without opposition in both 2002 and 2004, but could not seek a fifth term in 2006 due to term limits.

== Florida Senate campaign ==
In 2008, when State Senator Steven Geller was unable to seek re-election due to term limits, Ryan ran to succeed him in the 31st District, which was based in Broward County. He faced former State Representative Kenneth Gottlieb and Broward County School Board Member Eleanor Sobel in the Democratic primary. The Sun-Sentinel remarked that all three candidates were "cut-from-the-same-cloth" who "compiled similar voting records and took similar positions on issues." Despite that, however, they endorsed Ryan in what they called "a tough choice," suggesting, "Ryan offers the most promise in taking lessons learned from his legislative experience and using them to work with senators on both sides of the aisle to get things done." Ultimately, Sobel emerged narrowly victorious over her opponents, receiving 36% of the vote to Gottlieb's 34% and Ryan's 31%.

== Broward County Commission ==
Incumbent Broward County Commissioner John Rodstrom was unable to seek another term on the County Commission due to term limits, so Ryan ran to succeed him in the 7th District, which includes Dania Beach, Davie, Fort Lauderdale, Hollywood, Lazy Lake, and Wilton Manors in southern Broward County. He faced former County Commissioner Ken Keechl and Rodstrom's wife, Fort Lauderdale City Commissioner Charlotte Rodstrom, in the Democratic primary. Ryan campaigned on providing Dania residents with compensation related to the noise level that would result from a second runway at the Fort Lauderdale-Hollywood International Airport, and fought off charges that, because he was not from Fort Lauderdale, he would not be invested in solving the city's problems. Ultimately, Ryan won a narrow surprise victory over Keechl and Rodstrom, winning 40% of the vote to Keech's 32% and Rodstrom's 28%. In the general election, Ryan faced only write-in opposition and won handily, receiving 97% of the vote.
