= Les Miller (Florida politician) =

American politician

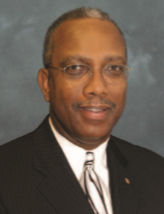

Member of the Hillsborough County Commission from the 3rd district
- In office 2011–2021
- Preceded by: Kevin White
- Succeeded by: Gwen Myers

Minority Leader of the Florida Senate
- In office November 3, 2004 – November 7, 2006
- Preceded by: Ron Klein
- Succeeded by: Steven Geller

Member of the Florida Senate
- In office November 7, 2000 – November 7, 2006
- Preceded by: Jim Hargrett
- Succeeded by: Arthenia Joyner
- Constituency: 21st district (2000–2002); 18th district (2002–2006)

Minority Leader of the Florida House of Representatives
- In office November 3, 1998 – November 7, 2000
- Preceded by: Buzz Ritchie
- Succeeded by: Lois Frankel

Member of the Florida House of Representatives from the 59th district
- In office November 3, 1992 – November 7, 2000
- Preceded by: Brian Rush
- Succeeded by: Arthenia Joyner

Member of the Tampa City Council
- In office October 8, 1991 – December 3, 1991
- Preceded by: Perry Curtis Harvey Jr.
- Succeeded by: Perry Curtis Harvey Jr.
- Constituency: 5th district

Personal details
- Born: April 21, 1951 (age 75) Tampa, Florida, U.S.
- Party: Democratic
- Spouse: Gwendolyn M. "Gwen" Martin
- Children: 4
- Education: University of South Florida (B.A.)

Lesley J. Miller Jr. (born April 21, 1951) is an American Democratic politician who currently serves as a Hillsborough County Commissioner, representing the 3rd District since 2010. Prior to serving on the County Commission, Miller served in the Florida House of Representatives from 1992 to 2000, and in the Florida Senate from 2000 to 2006, and unsuccessfully ran for Congress in 2006.

== History ==
Miller was born in Tampa in 1951, and briefly attended Bethune-Cookman College before dropping out to serve in the United States Air Force from 1971 to 1974. He later attended the University of South Florida, where he served as the president of the Student Government Association, as the student representative on the Florida Board of Regents, and as President of the Black Student Union. Miller began working for the Tampa Electric Company in 1977 before retiring with a disability in 1987. Miller was appointed to the Tampa-Hillsborough County Cable TV Board in 1981, serving until 1991. In 1982, Miller ran for the Florida House of Representatives from the 63rd District, which included most of downtown Tampa. He ultimately placed last in the Democratic primary, receiving 9% of the vote to Jim Hargrett's 34%, Warren Dawson's 31%, Bob Lester's 13%, and George Butler's 13%. Miller was subsequently appointed to the Hillsborough City-County Planning Commission in 1987, and unsuccessfully ran for the Tampa City Council for an at-large seat in 1988. He started a government relations firm and briefly worked for the Tampa Urban League as its vice-president and Chief Operating Officer before he was laid off, at which point he began working as a recruiter for Time Customer Service.

== Tampa City Council ==
In 1991, following the indictment and suspension of City Councilman Perry Harvey, the only African-American member of the council, Miller announced that he would run to succeed him in the 5th District, a heavily black district that included most of East Tampa. In the nonpartisan primary, he faced a number of candidates, most notably journalist Nadine Smith, pastor James D. Sykes, caseworker Pete Edwards, and businessman Roy Robinson. Miller based his campaign on providing affordable housing to the district's residents, arguing that when people own their own houses, it produces "vibrant, productive neighborhoods" that get more people involved in city government. The American Family Association, which was seeking to repeal the city's sexual orientation anti-discrimination ordinance, sent out fliers attacking Miller for supporting the ordinance. Miller strongly argued against repealing the ordinance, noting, "By my being a black man, I can't discriminate against someone because of their race, sex, sexual preference or national origin. Because I know what it is like to be discriminated against." Ultimately, Miller narrowly secured a spot in the runoff election, beating Sykes 21–18% for second place, while Smith placed first with 27% of the vote.

In the runoff election against Smith, several of Miller's former rivals endorsed him, as did the St. Petersburg Times, which praised him for having "presented a vision of Tampa as a city of thriving neighborhoods and provided specific suggestions to accomplish that goal." Despite Smith's lead over Miller in the initial election, he overwhelmingly defeated her in the runoff, winning 58–42%, largely because of his strong performance in the district's black precincts.

However, Miller only ended up serving for about two months on the city council. When suspended councilman Perry Harvey was acquitted by a jury of embezzlement charges, he was statutorily entitled to resume his office. Accordingly, after only 56 days on the council, Miller left office. Having quit his job as a recruiter, Miller was unemployed and, despite being a former elected official, was forced to bartend at parties to pay his bills. Miller held office on the council from October 8, 1991 until December 3, 1991.

== Florida House of Representatives ==
In 1992, State Representative Jim Hargrett, who had represented the 63rd District in the legislature, announced that he would run for the Florida Senate rather than seek re-election in the renumbered 59th District, which contained most of the territory he had previously represented. Miller announced that he would run to succeed Hargrett, and he won the Democratic primary unopposed. In the general election, he faced Nancy Vildibill, the Republican nominee. Miller campaigned on his support for increasing government spending on public education and healthcare, closing tax loopholes utilized by the wealthy and corporations, growth management, and campaign finance reform. The St. Petersburg Times endorsed Miller over Vildibill, praising him for his diverse life experiences and his "clearer grasp on the issues in his district." Ultimately, owing to the district's strong Democratic lean, Miller won his first term in a landslide, receiving 72% of the vote to Vildibill's 28%.

Miller was re-elected entirely unopposed in 1994 and 1996, and was selected as the Democratic Whip for the 1996–1998 session, serving under Minority Leader Buzz Ritchie. In summer of 1998, Willie Logan, who had been selected as the Democratic caucus as its Speaker-designate in the event that it won a majority in the 1998 elections, was ousted and replaced by Anne Mackenzie. Following an outcry from black lawmakers, Mackenzie abruptly announced that she wouldn't seek re-election, which necessitated another election for the party's leader for the 1998–2000 session. Miller announced his candidacy, and was opposed by Josephus Eggelletion and Al Lawson. After Miller appeared to secure the requisite number of votes, Eggelletion withdrew from the contest, but Lawson continued running, arguing that Miller "has some problems with the Black Caucus members" and was being "used" by the party's white legislators to gloss over the party's racial problems. Ultimately, however, Miller ended up defeating Lawson, winning 34 votes to Lawson's 18. Miller won re-election in 1998 unopposed, but was unable to serve as Speaker following the elections, in which Democrats, already in the minority, lost seven additional seats.

== Florida Senate ==
In 2000, State Senator Jim Hargrett was unable to run for re-election due to term limits, and Miller ran to succeed him in the 21st District, which included heavily black neighborhoods in Tampa, St. Petersburg and Bradenton. He faced former State Education Commissioner Doug Jamerson, who had previously represented St. Petersburg in the state house, in the Democratic primary. Miller, who raised significantly more than Jamerson and represented more of the district than Jamerson did in the House, was widely seen as the frontrunner for the seat, which Jamerson acknowledged. The race between Miller and Jamerson remained relatively civil, with each of them emphasizing their experience though Jamerson attacked Miller for not working to prevent the privatization of Tampa General Hospital, and Miller noted that Jamerson "had some high profile positions and wasn't able to keep it up." The two candidates split newspaper endorsements, with the Sarasota Herald-Tribune and the Times endorsing Jamerson while the Tampa Tribune endorsed Miller. On Election Day, Miller won 74% of the vote in Hillsborough County, Jamerson won 86% of the vote in Pinellas County, and the two came to a draw in Manatee County. However, because the Hillsborough portions of the district were more sizable than the other two counties combined, Miller was able to prevail over Jamerson, 54–46%.

In the general election, Miller faced Republican nominee Rudy Bradley, a fellow state representative who had been elected to a safely Democratic House district in St. Petersburg as a Democrat before switching parties in 1999. Miller focused his campaign on economic development and health care, while criticizing Bradley for his party switch. However, despite Bradley's prodigious fundraising, he was at a severe disadvantage in the heavily Democratic district. In the end, Miller won his first term in the Senate in a landslide, beating Bradley 70–26%, with independent candidate Kim Coljohn winning 4% of the vote.

Following the 2000 census and the redistricting that followed, Miller was unopposed for re-election in the 18th District, which included most of the territory he had previously represented. Miller was selected by the Senate Democratic caucus to serve as Minority Leader for the 2004–2006 legislative session. He served alongside House Minority Leader Chris Smith, which was the first time in state history that black lawmakers simultaneously held leadership posts in both chambers.

== 2006 congressional campaign ==
When Congressman Jim Davis opted to run for governor in 2006 rather than seek re-election, Miller ran to succeed him in the 11th District, which included most of the territory he had represented in the state senate. Miller faced Hillsborough County Commissioner Kathy Castor, the daughter of longtime politician Betty Castor, in the 11th district's Democratic primary. He entered the race with endorsements from his female Democratic colleagues in the state senate, while Castor won the endorsement of EMILY's List. An early poll showed Castor leading Miller by nearly twenty points, and Castor raised more than twice what Miller did as the campaign continued. Both the St. Petersburg Times and the Tampa Tribune endorsed Castor over Miller. The Times praised Miller's "experience and leadership qualities," but endorsing Castor "for her rounded experience and consistent record in pushing the right issues for the growing region." The Tribune similarly praised Miller for his "smart ideas on all the key issues" and for his legislative accomplishments, but concluded that Castor was the better choice because of her energy, determination, and leadership potential in Congress. Castor ended up defeating Miller by a wide margin, winning 54% of the vote to his 34%, with the remaining 16% going to other candidates.

== Hillsborough County Commission ==
In 2010, Miller made a return to elected office by challenging County Commissioner Kevin White, who represented the 3rd District, for re-election in the Democratic primary. Miller, along with Hillsborough County Children's Board member Valerie Goddard, opted to challenge White due to his ethical issues—he had been found guilty in a civil case of sexually harassing his former aide. Miller didn't draw attention to White's ethical troubles, instead emphasizing his own legislative accomplishments and arguing that the district's needs had gone unmet during White's tenure. The Times and Tribune split their endorsements. The Times endorsed Miller, arguing that his "big edge in political experience" and tenure as an "effective lawmaker who knew how to work with the opposing party to help his constituents" would serve the district well, while the Tribune endorsed Goddard, concluding that while Miller was more experienced, "he brings little passion or urgency to the campaign" and "he has had his time." Miller ended up winning the primary by a wide margin, receiving 51% of the vote while Goddard won 29% and White placed third with 20%. In the general election, he faced only write-in opposition and won his first term on the County Commission with 96% of the vote. He was re-elected in 2014 and 2018 without opposition.

Miller, who was prevented from running for another term on the County Commission in 2020 due to term limits, initially announced that he would run to succeed Hillsborough County Clerk Pat Frank. Though he was endorsed by Frank in 2019, he dropped out of the race a few months later, citing his desire to spend time with his family and his severe arthritis, along with other health problems.

Florida House of Representatives
| Preceded by Brian Rush | Member of the Florida House of Representatives from the 59th district 1992–2000 | Succeeded by Arthenia Joyner |
| Preceded by Buzz Ritchie | Minority Leader of the Florida House of Representatives; 1998–2000 | Succeeded by Lois Frankel |
Florida Senate
| Preceded by Jim Hargrett | Member of the Florida Senate from the 21st district 2000–2002 | Succeeded by Mike Bennett |
| Preceded by Howard E. Futch | Member of the Florida Senate from the 18th district 2002–2006 | Succeeded by Arthenia Joyner |
| Preceded by Ron Klein | Minority Leader of the Florida Senate; 2004–2006 | Succeeded by Steven Geller |
Political offices
| Preceded by Kevin White | Member of the Hillsborough County Commission from the 3rd district 2011–2021 | Succeeded by Gwen Myers |
