= Doris Hargrett Clack =

African-American librarian

- Born: March 24, 1928; Wakulla County
- Died: November 22, 1995 (aged 67)
- Education: Florida A&M University, University of Michigan, University of Pittsburgh
- Occupation: Librarian
- Employer: Florida State University

Doris Hargrett Clack (March 24, 1928 – November 22, 1995) was an African-American librarian and expert on cataloging and classification. She was a professor of library science at Florida State University for 23 years and did extensive scholarly work on the library classification of black studies and the second edition of the Anglo-American Cataloguing Rules (AACR2).

== Family and early life ==
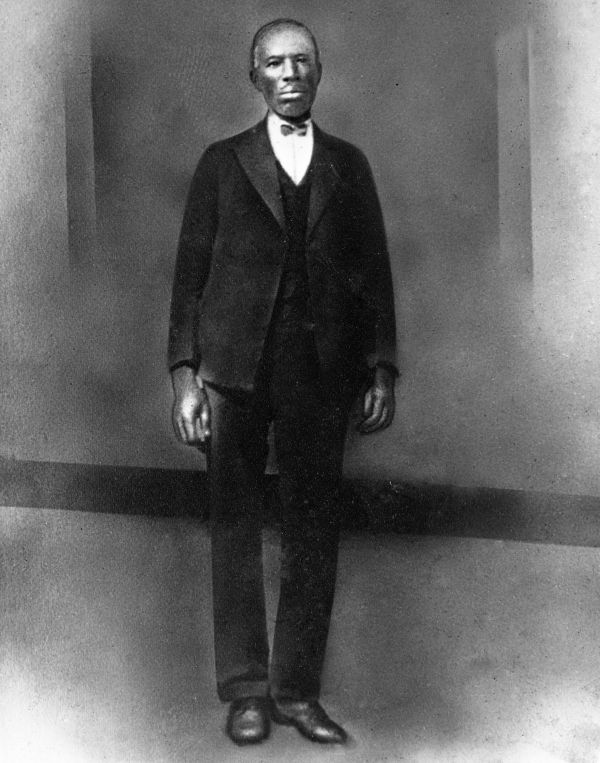
Andrew Joshua Hargrett

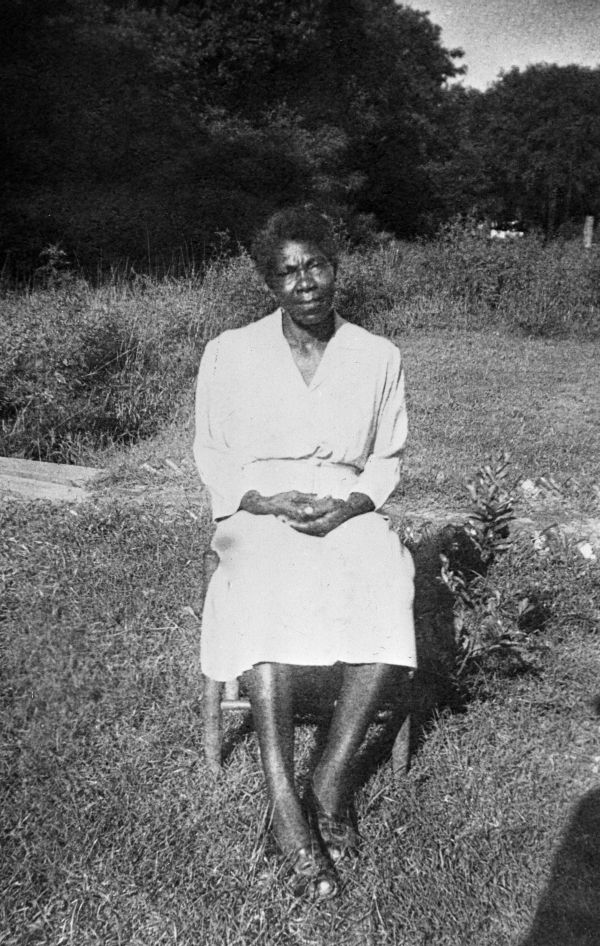
Delia Leana Green

Doris Hargrett Clack was born Doris Alease Hargrett on March 24, 1928, in Hyde Park in Wakulla County, Florida, a rural part of the Florida Panhandle. She was the eighth of nine children of Andrew Joshua Hargrett and Delia Leana Green.

Her paternal grandfather, Amos Hargrett (1833-1905), was born into slavery but went on to hold a number of political offices and was one of the few African-American delegates to the Florida Constitutional Convention of 1885. Amos Hargrett had eleven children and four of them became teachers, including Andrew Hargrett, who attended the State Normal College that later became Florida A&M University. Andrew Hargrett, whose son dubbed him a "Frontier Professor", became an itinerant teacher and later school principal who supplemented his income through farming, fishing, and carpentry. Andrew Hargrett led the effort to improve African-American education in Wakulla County, leading to the founding of the first elementary school and the first high school, Shadeville High School, for African-Americans in the county.

Her maternal grandfather was Dennis Green, a farmer in Liberty County, Florida. Since there was no secondary school for African-Americans in the county, a family roundtable was held to determine which of Green's four children would attend school in Apalachicola, Florida. Delia Green was chosen and in Apalachicola she met Andrew Hargrett. Delia Green would become a schoolteacher herself.

== Education ==
Doris Hargrett Clack began her schooling in Wakulla County schools founded by her father and graduated from Lincoln High School in Tallahassee, Florida. She graduated with an A.B. from Florida A&M University in 1949, a master's in library science from the University of Michigan in 1956, and a PhD in library science from the University of Pittsburgh in 1973. Her dissertation was titled An Investigation Into the Adequacy of Library of Congress Subject Headings for Resources for Black Studies.

== Career ==
Clack taught for seven years in public high schools in Gadsden, Leon, and Wakulla counties in the Florida Panhandle. After earning her master's degree, she started working for the Florida A&M University library, eventually heading the cataloging and technical services divisions.

In 1973, was hired as an associate professor at the Florida State University School of Library Science in Tallahassee, Florida, where she taught cataloging until her death in 1995.

One of her students wrote of Clack:

She had always been so elegant, tall and fashionably dressed, with a milk chocolate complexion, a beautiful smile, and regal posture [...] she was serious about cataloging and firm, even strict, in teaching us the discipline. But she also seemed very caring, and she followed the fashion trends [...]

Clack authored numerous books and articles on library cataloging, including Black Literature Resources: Analysis and Organization (1975) and Authority Control: Principles, Applications, and Instructions (1990), which has been described as "a classic reference on the topic" of authority control.

Clack conducted numerous workshops on the introduction of the new rules in second edition of Anglo-American Cataloguing Rules (AACR2), published in 1979. In what was described as "perhaps the height of her career", she organized the International Conference on AACR2 in March 1979, which featured Seymour Lubetzky, Michael Gorman, and numerous other figures pivotal in the development of AACR2. She also edited and wrote the preface for the conference proceedings, which were published as The Making of a Code: The Issues Underlying AACR2 (1980).

Clack also worked extensively with libraries in West Africa. She taught at the library school of the University of Maiduguri from 1987 to 1988, studied libraries in Ibadan and Lagos, and lectured throughout Nigeria. In the 1990s she traveled twice to Ghana to lecture at the University of Ghana and elsewhere. A testament to the ties that Clack developed there was that one friend in Morso named her daughter after Clack.

== Personal life ==
Doris Hargrett Clack married Harold Lee Clack in 1954 and had two children, Harold Levi Clack and Herek Lerron Clack. She died of cancer on 22 November 1995.

== See also ==
- Jim Hargrett, another descendant of Amos Hargrett, served in the Florida Legislature
