= Harold J. Dyer =

American politician

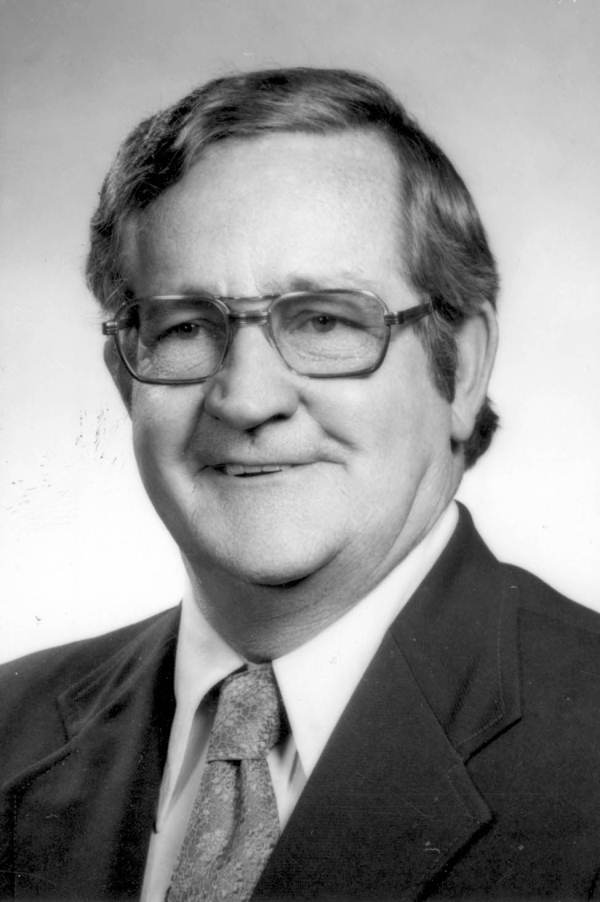
- Dyer in 1974

Member of the Florida House of Representatives from the 93rd district
- In office 1972–1982
- Preceded by: Dick Clark
- Succeeded by: Debby Sanderson

Personal details
- Born: September 2, 1921 Chicago, Illinois, U.S.
- Died: March 26, 2008 (aged 86)
- Party: Democratic
- Education: Wright Junior College

Harold J. Dyer (September 2, 1921 – March 26, 2008) was an American politician. He served as a Democratic member for the 93rd district of the Florida House of Representatives.

== Life and career ==
Dyer was born in Chicago, Illinois. He attended Wright Junior College.

Dyer was a businessman.

In 1972, Dyer was elected to represent the 93rd district of the Florida House of Representatives, succeeding Dick Clark. He served until 1982, when he was succeeded by Debby Sanderson.

Dyer died on March 26, 2008, of heart failure, at the age of 86.
