= Evan Jenne =

American politician (born 1977)

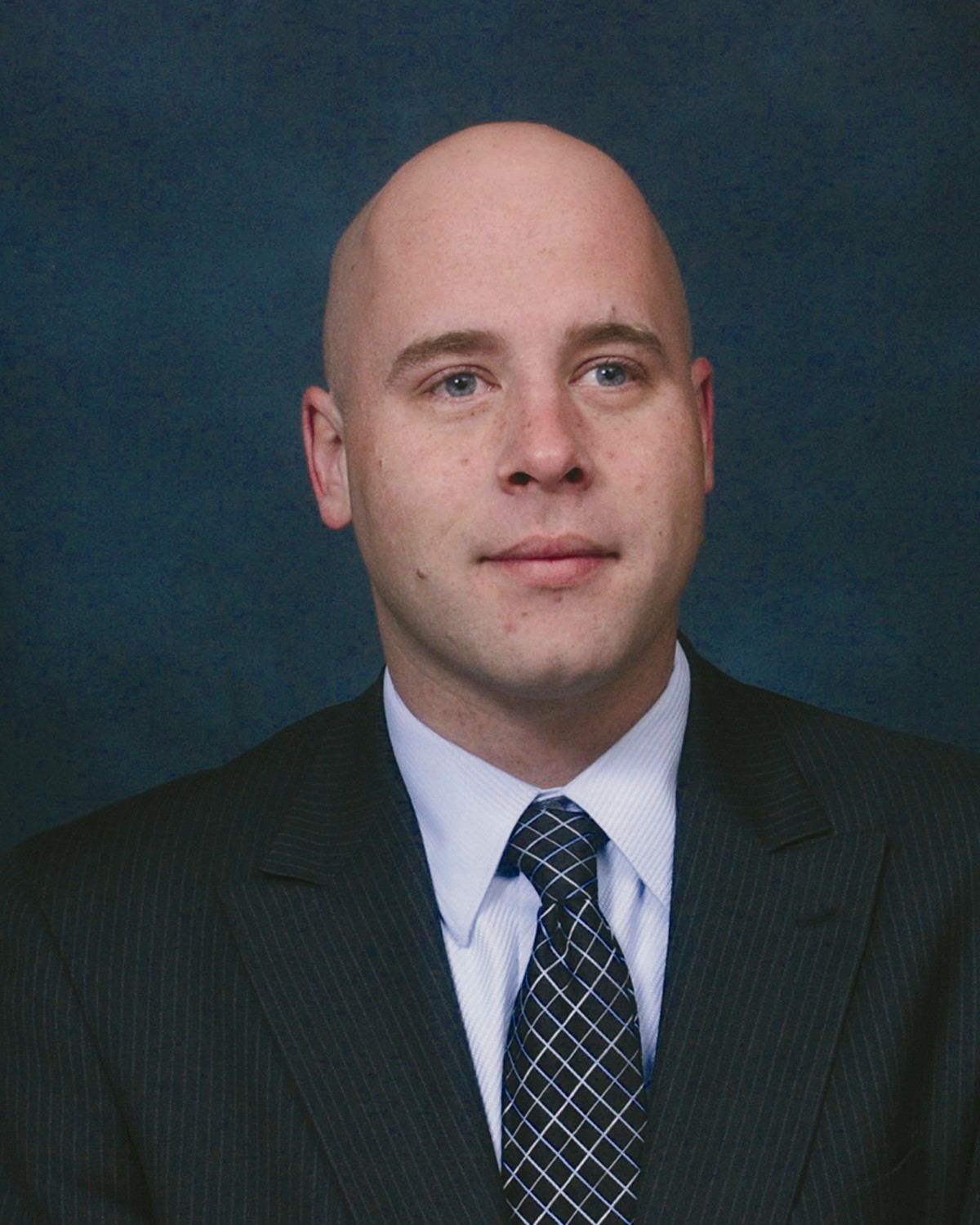

Minority Leader of the Florida House of Representatives
- In office January 11, 2022 – November 22, 2022
- Preceded by: Bobby DuBose
- Succeeded by: Fentrice Driskell

Member of the Florida House of Representatives from the 99th district
- In office November 4, 2014 – November 8, 2022
- Preceded by: Elaine Schwartz
- Succeeded by: Daryl Campbell

Member of the Florida House of Representatives from the 100th district
- In office November 7, 2006 – November 6, 2012
- Preceded by: Tim Ryan
- Succeeded by: Redistricted

Personal details
- Born: September 4, 1977 (age 48) Hollywood, Florida, U.S.
- Party: Democratic
- Education: Florida State University, Tallahassee (BS, MPA)

Evan Boyd Jenne (born September 4, 1977) is an American Democratic politician who had served as a member of the Florida House of Representatives, representing the 99th District, which included most of Hollywood in southern Broward County, from 2014 to 2022. Previously, Jenne represented the 100th District, which stretched from Dania Beach to Pembroke Pines in southern Broward County, from 2006 to 2012. Jenne has been co-leader under Broward colleague Bobby DuBose as House minority leader for the 2020–2022 Legislature.

== History ==
Jenne was born in Hollywood to Kenneth Jenne II and Caroline Jenne, who later divorced. His father served as a Broward County Commissioner, State Senator, and as the Sheriff of Broward County.

Evan Jenne attended the Florida State University, where he graduated with a degree in political science in 1999, and then a Master of Public Administration in 2002.

== Florida House of Representatives ==
In 2006, following the inability of State Representative Tim M. Ryan to seek re-election due to term limits, Jenne ran to succeed him in the 100th District, which stretched from Dania Beach to Pembroke Pines in southern Broward County. He won both the Democratic primary and the general election entirely unopposed. During his first term in the legislature, he authored legislation that "would compensate a 6-year-old boy born with brain damage because of negligence by South Broward Hospital District employees" and that would allow victims of sexual assault to be granted leave by their employers.

In 2008, Jenne was opposed in the primary by Robert Kellner and Freda Sherman Stevens, whom he was able to handily defeat, receiving 52% of the vote to Kellner's 30% and Stevens's 18%, and in the general election, he was re-elected unopposed. He faced Edward Bender, an independent candidate, when he ran for re-election in 2010, and earned the endorsement of the Sun-Sentinel, which praised Jenne for his "pro-consumer record" and for "crossing the aisle and working with House Republicans to get things accomplished." Ultimately, Bender did not pose a significant risk to Jenne, and he was overwhelmingly re-elected, receiving 66% of the vote to Bender's 34%.

When the state's legislative districts were redrawn in 2012, Jenne was located in the same district as fellow State Representative Elaine Schwartz. Seeking to avoid a divisive election with Schwartz, he declined to seek re-election, initially announcing that he would run for the Broward County Commission in the 7th District. He later dropped out of that race, saying, "I took a harder look at it and the content [on the County Commission] didn't interest me as much as the content in Tallahassee. It's a completely different situation."

Instead, because Schwartz was term-limited in 2014, Jenne ran to succeed her in the 99th District, which stretches from Dania Beach to Southwest Ranches in southern Broward County. Ultimately, Jenne was successful in his bid to return to the legislature, winning in the 99th District without opposition. He was re-elected in 2016 and 2018 without opposition.

For the 2020–22 Legislature, Jenne and fellow Broward Democrat Bobby DuBose were elected by the House Democratic caucus to serve as co-minority leaders.

Florida House of Representatives
Preceded by Tim Ryan	Member of the Florida House of Representatives from the 100th district 2006–2012	Succeeded by Joseph Gibbons
Preceded by Elaine Schwartz	Member of the Florida House of Representatives from the 99th district 2014–2022	Succeeded by Daryl Campbell
Preceded by Bobby DuBose	Minority Leader of the Florida House of Representatives; 2022	Succeeded by Fentrice Driskell
