= Senator Thurston (disambiguation) =

John M. Thurston (1847–1916) was a U.S. Senator from Nebraska from 1895 to 1901. Senator Thurston may also refer to:

- Lloyd Thurston (1880–1970), Iowa State Senate
- Perry Thurston (born 1961), Florida State Senate
