= Senator McPherson (disambiguation) =

John R. McPherson (1833–1897) was a U.S. Senator from New Jersey from 1877 to 1895. Senator McPherson may also refer to:

- Bruce McPherson (born 1944), California State Senate
- Marquis Lafayette McPherson (1822–1871), Iowa State Senate
- Tom McPherson (1935–2020), Florida State Senate
