= Joseph Gibbons =

Joseph Gibbons may refer to:

- Joseph Gibbons (Florida politician) (born 1948), Florida businessman and Democratic politician
- Joseph Gibbons (Toronto politician) (died 1946), municipal politician in Toronto, Canada

== See also ==
- Joe Gibbon (1935–2019), American baseball player
- Joseph Gibbins (1888–1965), British trade unionist and politician
