= Jim Hargrett =

American politician

James T. Hargrett Jr.
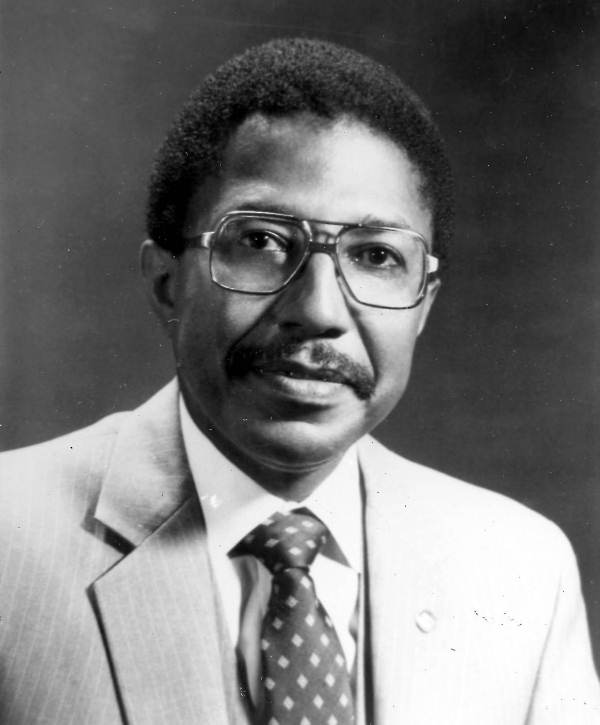

Member of the Florida Senate from the 21st district
- In office January 1993 – January 2001
- Preceded by: John Grant
- Succeeded by: Les Miller

Member of the Florida House of Representatives from the 63rd district
- In office January 1983 – January 1993
- Preceded by: Spud Clements
- Succeeded by: Dean Saunders

Personal details
- Born: July 31, 1942 (age 84) Tampa, Florida, U.S.
- Party: Democratic
- Spouse: Berlyn
- Children: 2
- Education: Morehouse College; Atlanta University
- Occupation: Businessman

James T. Hargrett Jr. (born July 31, 1942) is a former state legislator in Florida. He served in the Florida House of Representatives from 1982 to 1992 (63rd district). He also served in the Florida Senate from 1992 to 2000.

In 1998, Hargrett was one of several African-American Democrats in the Florida Legislature to endorse Republican Jeb Bush for Governor.

He is a descendant of Amos Hargrett.

== See also ==
- Andrew Hargrett
- Doris Hargrett Clack
- Amos Hargrett
