= Senator Sanderson =

Senator Sanderson may refer to:

- Debby Sanderson (born 1941), Florida State Senate
- George Sanderson (politician) (1810–1886), Pennsylvania State Senate
- John P. Sanderson (1818–1864), Pennsylvania State Senate
- John Pease Sanderson (1816–1871), Florida State Senate
- Norman W. Sanderson (born 1951), North Carolina State Senate
- Robert B. Sanderson (1825–1887), Wisconsin State Senate
