= Shadeville, Florida =

- Unincorporated community
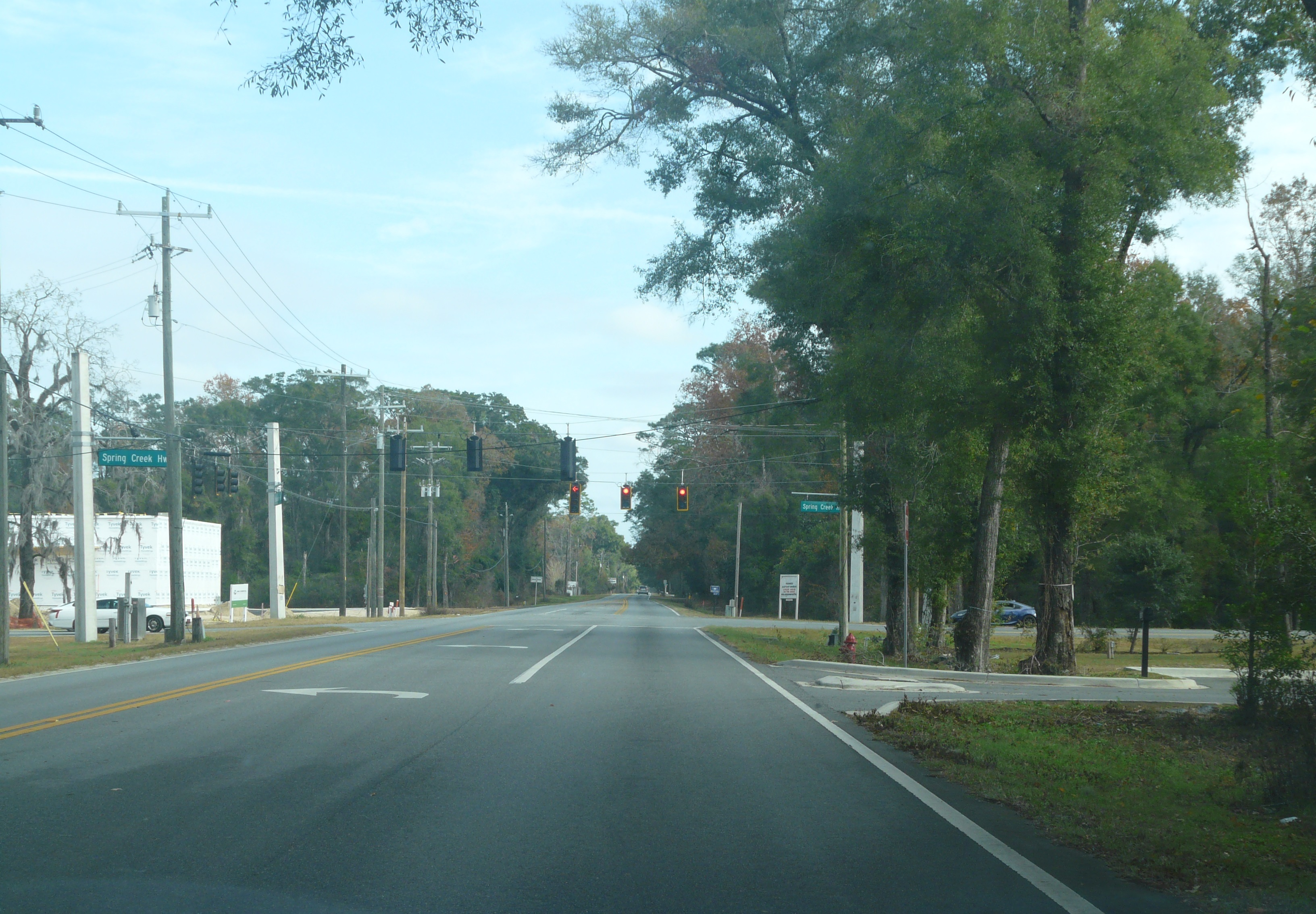

- Location within Florida
- Coordinates: 30°11′58″N 84°18′32″W
- Country: United States
- State: Florida
- County: Wakulla
- Elevation: 26 ft (7.9 m)
- Time zone: UTC-5 (Eastern (EST))
  - Summer (DST): UTC-4 (EDT)
- Area code: 850
- GNIS feature ID: 306371

Shadeville is an unincorporated community in Wakulla County, Florida, United States.

It is home to Shadeville Elementary School and was home to Shadeville High School established with the efforts of Andrew Hargrett.
