= Ken Jenne =

American politician

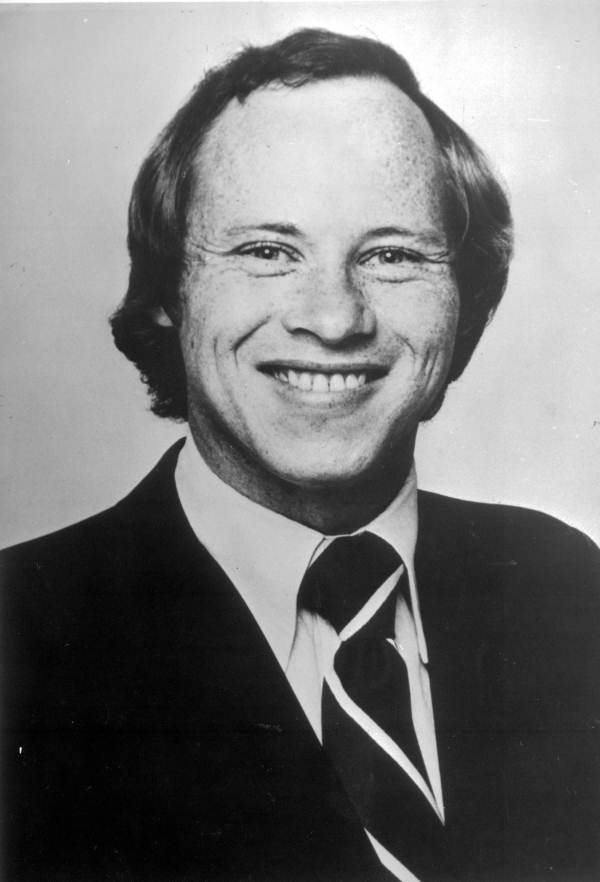

Sheriff of Broward County
- In office 1997–2007
- Preceded by: Ron Cochran
- Succeeded by: Al Lamberti

Member of the Florida Senate from the 29th district
- In office 1993–1997
- Preceded by: Peter Weinstein
- Succeeded by: Steven Geller

Member of the Florida Senate from the 30th district
- In office 1991–1993
- Preceded by: Tom McPherson
- Succeeded by: Matthew Meadows

Member of the Florida Senate from the 32nd district
- In office 1979–1989
- Preceded by: William G. Zinkil
- Succeeded by: Howard Forman

Minority leader of the Florida Senate
- In office 1994–1998
- Preceded by: ???
- Succeeded by: Buddy Dyer

Personal details
- Born: December 1, 1946 (age 79) Lake Worth Beach, Florida, U.S.
- Party: Democratic
- Spouse: Caroline M. Jenne (m. circa 1976-2011; divorced)
- Relations: Evan Jenne (son)
- Education: Palm Beach Junior College; Florida Atlantic University (BA); Florida State University (JD)

Kenneth C. Jenne II (born December 1, 1946) is a former American politician who served as a member of the Florida State Senate and a former sheriff of Broward County (Broward County Sheriff's Office), which encompasses Fort Lauderdale. He resigned as sheriff in September 2007, after having pleaded guilty to federal tax evasion and mail fraud. On November 16, 2007, he was sentenced to a year and a day in federal prison.

== Education ==
Jenne was born and raised in Lake Worth Beach, Florida. His father, Kenneth C. Jenne Sr., was employed by a utility company, and his mother worked for the Palm Beach County Clerk of the Court. He attended Palm Beach Junior College, where he was student government president. In 1968, he earned his Bachelor of Arts in political science from Florida Atlantic University in Boca Raton, where he served as student body president.

He subsequently earned a Juris Doctor from Florida State University in Tallahassee. He later served in the United States Army Reserve. He retired at the rank of sergeant as a public safety supervisor. He graduated from the FBI's National Executive Institute, as well as the National Sheriffs' Institute.

== Career ==
=== Politics ===
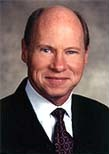
Jenne as Sheriff of Broward County

By 1972, Jenne was a prosecutor for the Broward County State Attorney's Office. Following his time as a prosecutor, he was elected to the Broward County Commission and served as commission chairman in 1976.

Jenne was elected to the Florida Senate in 1978 to represent District 32. He would remain in this position until 1988. Jenne was subsequently elected to the Florida Senate in 1990, this time representing District 29 and he would stay in this position until 1998. Jenne is credited with holding a majority of the top committee chairmanships in the Florida Senate, including the position of Senate Democratic Leader. In January 1998, Florida Governor Lawton Chiles, a fellow Democrat, selected him to become Broward County sheriff to succeed the late Ron Cochran.

=== Law enforcement ===
As sheriff, Jenne directed a 6,300-member organization with a $638 million budget. Under his direction, the organization was responsible for law enforcement and fire rescue duties in 14 cities and towns, as well as all unincorporated areas of Broward County. He resigned on September 4, 2007 in light of federal corruption charges.

== Corruption ==
Jenne resigned in September 2007, after agreeing to plead guilty to federal tax evasion and mail fraud charges after a corruption investigation uncovered crimes in his outside business dealings, federal prosecutors said. Jenne faced a possible grand jury indictment on more serious money laundering charges. Several of Jenne's long-term Democratic allies, including former Florida Attorney General Bob Butterworth and former Florida Senate President Jim Scott, pleaded for leniency.

Jenne pleaded guilty to three counts of tax evasion and one count of mail fraud conspiracy and was sentenced to a year and a day in federal prison.

== Incarceration ==
Before being assigned to prison, Jenne resided in the Federal Detention Center, Miami. In December 2007, he was transferred to the United States Penitentiary, Atlanta. Later that month he was moved to the penitentiary in Lee County, Virginia.

Jenne served most of his sentence in the Virginia prison. By September 2008, he was moved back to FDC Miami, as he was a possible witness in a civil case against the Broward Sheriff's Office (BSO) involving a jail beating. Jenne was released from FDC Miami on September 29, 2008. He now reportedly lives in Hollywood, Florida and is a business consultant.

Party political offices
Preceded by Bill Gunter	Democratic nominee for Treasurer, Insurance Commissioner, and Fire Marshal of Florida; 1988	Succeeded by George L. Stuart Jr.
Florida Senate
Preceded by William G. Zinkil	Member of the Florida Senate from the 32nd district 1979–1989	Succeeded by Howard Forman
Preceded by Tom McPherson	Member of the Florida Senate from the 30th district 1991–1993	Succeeded by Matthew Meadows
Preceded by Peter Weinstein	Member of the Florida Senate from the 29th district 1993–1997	Succeeded by Steven Geller
Political offices
Preceded by Ron Cochran	Sheriff of Broward County; 1997-2007	Succeeded by Al Lamberti
