= Matthew Meadows =

American politician (1938–2025)

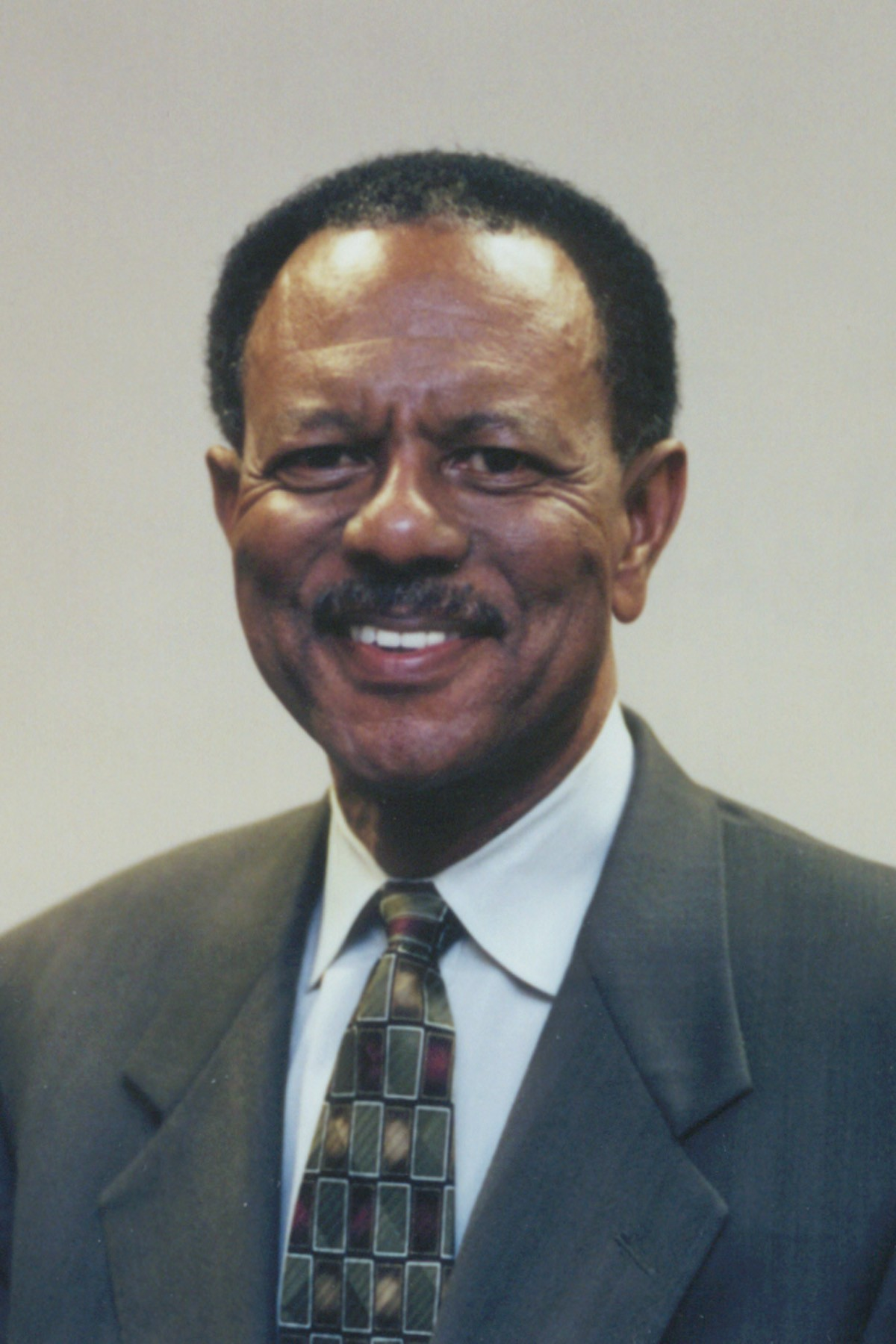

Member of the Florida House of Representatives from the 94th district
- In office November 7, 2000 – November 4, 2008
- Preceded by: Josephus Eggelletion
- Succeeded by: Hazelle P. Rogers

Member of the Florida Senate from the 30th district
- In office November 3, 1992 – November 3, 1998
- Preceded by: Ken Jenne
- Succeeded by: M. Mandy Dawson

Personal details
- Born: September 5, 1938 Fort Pierce, Florida, U.S.
- Died: May 7, 2025 (aged 86) Fort Lauderdale, Florida, U.S.
- Party: Democratic
- Spouse: Charley Mae Harris
- Children: 5
- Profession: Educator

Matthew Meadows (September 5, 1938 – May 7, 2025) was an American educator and Democratic politician who served as a member of both chambers of the Florida Legislature.

== Early life and education ==
Meadows was born in Fort Pierce, Florida. He received his Bachelor of Science degree from Bethune-Cookman College in 1961 and was later awarded an Honorary Doctorate of Divinity.

== Career ==
Meadows was first elected to the Florida House of Representatives in 2000 and served four successive terms. Meadows was unable to seek re-election in 2008 due to term limits. He served in the Florida Senate from 1992 to 1998.

During his time in the Senate, Meadows was a part of the effort to pay reparations to the descendants of the victims of the Rosewood massacre. This bill made Florida one of the first states to tackle the issue of monetary amends for past racial violence.

== Personal life and death ==
Meadows was married to Charley Mae Harris, a native of Macon, Georgia. He and his wife had five children.

Meadows died on May 7, 2025, at the age of 86.

Florida Senate
| Preceded by Ken Jenne | Member of the Florida Senate from the 30th district 1992–1998 | Succeeded by M. Mandy Dawson |
Florida House of Representatives
| Preceded by Josephus Eggelletion | Member of the Florida House of Representatives from the 94th district 2000–2008 | Succeeded by Hazelle P. Rogers |
