= Bobby DuBose =

American Politician

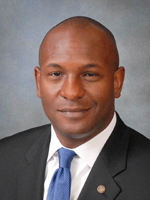

Minority Leader of the Florida House of Representatives
- In office November 16, 2020 – January 11, 2022
- Preceded by: Kionne McGhee
- Succeeded by: Evan Jenne

Member of the Florida House of Representatives from the 94th district
- In office November 4, 2014 – January 11, 2022
- Preceded by: Perry Thurston
- Succeeded by: Daryl Campbell

Personal details
- Born: February 15, 1971 (age 55) Fort Lauderdale, Florida, U.S.
- Party: Democratic
- Spouse: Yvette DuBose
- Children: 2
- Education: University of Florida (BA)

Bobby Brainard DuBose (born February 15, 1971) is an American Democratic politician who served as a member of the Florida House of Representatives, representing the 94th District, which includes most of Fort Lauderdale in central Broward County, from 2014 to 2022. DuBose served as minority leader with fellow Broward colleague as Evan Jenne co-leader for the 2020–2022 Legislature. On July 27, 2021, DuBose announced his resignation from the Florida House of Representatives, effective January 11, 2022.

== Early life and career ==
DuBose was born in Fort Lauderdale and attended the University of Florida, graduating with a degree in economics and then working as a self-employed insurance agent. In 2009, he ran for the Fort Lauderdale City Commission from District III, and came in first in the municipal primary election, receiving 49% of the vote to Pamela Adams's 31%, Nadine Hankerson's 12%, and Magdalene J. Lewis's 8%. Because no candidate received a majority, a runoff election was held between DuBose and Adams, which DuBose won handily with 64% of the vote. In 2011, DuBose was elected to his second term without opposition and served as the Vice-Mayor of Fort Lauderdale from 2011 to 2012.

== Florida House of Representatives ==
In 2014, incumbent state representative Perry Thurston was unable to seek re-election due to term limits, so DuBose ran to succeed him. He faced Lauderdale Lakes City Commissioner Levoyd Williams in the Democratic primary, which was an open primary because no other candidates filed. The two candidates pledged to run a positive campaign because DuBose "grew up playing with Williams' children," both candidates are members of Kappa Alpha Psi, and they are lifelong friends. DuBose pledged to work with Republicans in the legislature, noting, "I've learned to work with Republicans, Democrats, and independents, and we've been able to mobilize on central issues that affect us." In the end, DuBose defeated Williams in a landslide, receiving 67% of the vote, to win his first term in the legislature.

In 2020, DuBose faced 21-year old activist Elijah Manley in the Democratic primary. After a contentious primary, DuBose won his final term in the Florida House of Representatives with 69% of the vote to Manley's 31%.

For the 2020–22 Legislature, Dubose and fellow Broward Democrat Evan Jenne were elected by the House Democratic caucus to serve as co-minority leaders.

On April 20, Dubose declared he was running for Congress in the special election after incumbent Alcee Hastings died from pancreatic cancer.

On July 27, 2021, DuBose submitted his irrevocable resignation as required by Florida Law, to run for Congress. As noted in his resignation letter, he will step down from the Florida House of Representatives on January 11, 2022.

DuBose was defeated in the November 2, 2021 Special Democratic Primary Election for Florida's 20th Congressional District. He placed fifth out of eleven candidates.

Florida House of Representatives
Preceded by Perry Thurston	Member of the Florida House of Representatives from the 94th district 2014–2022	Vacant
Preceded by Kionne McGhee	Minority Leader of the Florida House of Representatives; 2020–2022	Succeeded by Evan Jenne
