= Amos Hargrett =

Florida politician

- Born: September 14, 1833; Miccosukee, Florida, U.S.
- Died: November 1, 1905 (aged 72); Florida, U.S.
- Resting place: Walker Cemetery
- Occupations: Farmer, county commissioner, justice of the peace, postmaster
- Known for: Delegate to Florida's 1885 Constitutional Convention
- Children: Amos Hargrett Jr. (1865–1931)
- Relatives: James Hargrett (great-grandson)

Amos Hargrett (September 14, 1833 – November 1905) was a farmer, county commissioner, justice of the peace, and delegate to Florida's 1885 Constitutional Convention. He was one of seven delegates who were African American. Former Florida state senator James Hargrett is his great-grandson.

He was born in Miccosukee, Florida. He was enslaved.

He served as a Wakulla County Commissioner from 1868 to 1870 during the Reconstruction era. He served as commissioner of pilotage in St. Marks from 1874 to 1877. He served as a justice of the peace in Wakulla County in 1876 and 1877 and was a delegate to Florida's 1885 Constitutional Convention. From 1892 to 1894 he served as postmaster in St. Marks. A hushand and father he served as a deacon in the Missionary Baptist Church for thirty years. Amos Hargrett Jr. (1865 – 1931) was born in Wakulla County.

He served on the board of canvassers with W. T. Duval and James W. Smith Jr. in 1877.

He is buried at the Walker Cemetery.

== See also ==
- Andrew Hargrett
- Jim Hargrett
- Doris Hargrett Clack
- African American officeholders from the end of the Civil War until before 1900
