= Arthenia Joyner =

American politician

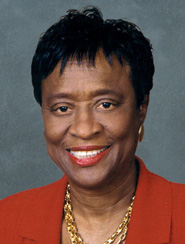

Minority Leader of the Florida Senate
- In office November 18, 2014 – November 21, 2016
- Preceded by: Chris Smith
- Succeeded by: Oscar Braynon

Member of the Florida Senate
- In office November 7, 2006 – November 8, 2016
- Preceded by: Les Miller
- Succeeded by: Darryl Rouson
- Constituency: 18th district (2006-2012); 19th district (2012–2016)

Member of the Florida House of Representatives from the 59th district
- In office November 7, 2000 – November 7, 2006
- Preceded by: Les Miller
- Succeeded by: Betty Reed

Personal details
- Born: February 3, 1943 (age 83) Lakeland, Florida, U.S.
- Party: Democratic
- Education: Florida A&M University (BS); Florida A&M University College of Law (JD)
- Profession: Teacher and attorney

Arthenia Joyner (born February 3, 1943) is an American politician, attorney, and civil rights activist from Florida. She served as a member of the Florida Senate for ten years, representing parts of the Tampa Bay Area from 2006 to 2016. She was the Senate minority leader during her last two years in office. Prior to being elected to the Senate, Joyner served three terms in the Florida House of Representatives, representing an eastern Tampa-based district from 2000 to 2006. Currently, Joyner is Of Counsel with the Swope, Rodante, Newsome & Steinberg law firm located in Ybor City, FL.

== History ==
Joyner was born in Lakeland, and attended Florida A&M University, receiving her bachelor's degree in political science in 1964. She later attended the Florida A&M University College of Law, graduating with her Juris Doctor in 1968. While attending FAMU, Joyner was twice arrested for her role in the civil rights movement for her protests in support of movie theater desegregation. After graduation, she worked as a legal assistant to State Representative Joe Lang Kershaw in 1969. Joyner was a founding partner in the law firm of Stewart, Joyner and Jordan-Holmes, and was the first black female attorney in Polk County and Hillsborough County. From 1984 to 1985, she served as the President of the National Bar Association, and was arrested for her role in a protest against apartheid during her tenure. In 1995, Joyner was appointed by then-President Bill Clinton to serve as the American representative at the United Nations Fourth World Conference on Women in Beijing.

In 1991, Joyner was appointed to the Hillsborough County Aviation Authority by then-Governor Lawton Chiles, on which she served as the first black board member. She was criticized by Chiles for billing twenty five thousand dollars to the Authority for airline tickets to attend meetings that did not directly relate to aviation issues. Joyner played a role in the development of the Airport Minority Advisory Council and in promoting hiring diversity for the Authority. She resigned from the Authority in 1999.

== Florida House of Representatives ==
Incumbent State Representative Les Miller was unable to seek another term in the Florida House of Representatives in 2000 due to term limits. Joyner ran to succeed him in the 59th District, which included Brandon and downtown Tampa. She was opposed in the Democratic primary by Frank Reddick, the President of the Sickle Cell Association of Hillsborough County. Because she and Reddick were the only two candidates who filed for the seat, the primary, which ordinarily would have been closed to only Democrats, was opened to the general electorate. Joyner and Reddick both campaigned on their support for reducing crime, increasing the availability of health care and child care, and creating good-paying jobs. Joyner significantly outraised Reddick, receiving campaign contributions from Bill McBride and Alex Sink. During the campaign, Reddick attacked Joyner for her alleged financial indiscretion on the Airport Authority and for allegedly losing touch with the community. However, Joyner handily defeated Reddick, winning 71% of the vote.

When Joyner ran for re-election in 2002, she was opposed by Libertarian nominee Rex Curry. She campaigned on her support for revitalizing east Tampa with economic development projects and on her philosophy that the government should do more "to care for the most vulnerable in society." She won re-election in a landslide, receiving 89% of the vote to Curry's 11%. She was re-elected without opposition in 2004.

== Florida Senate ==
In 2006, Les Miller, whom Joyner had succeeded in the State House, opted to run for Congress in 2006 rather than seeking another term in the Florida Senate. Joyner ran to succeed him in the 18th District, which included parts of Apollo Beach, Bradenton, St. Petersburg, and Tampa in Hillsborough, Manatee, and Pinellas Counties. She faced Gerald White, an electricity company manager, in the Democratic primary, and was endorsed by the St. Petersburg Times. The Times, which noted her "mixed" record and criticized her for being "missing in action," praised her for having "her priorities straight" and for being "a strong supporter of civil rights, health care, and open government." During the campaign, her legislative office was vandalized when "racist and vulgar phrases" were scratched onto her office's door and the door's lock was damaged. After the incident, Joyner expressed sadness that someone could "spew such hatred and venom at another human being in the twenty-first century," and called for an ongoing national discussion on racial issues. Joyner defeated White in the Democratic primary by a wide margin, winning 79% of the vote to his 21%, and advanced to the general election. In the general election, she was opposed by only a write-in candidate and won with nearly 100% of the vote. She was re-elected in 2010 without opposition.

When the state's legislative districts were redrawn in 2012, Joyner ran for re-election in the 19th District, which contained most of the territory that she had previously represented. She was unopposed in both the primary and general elections, and won re-election to a final term uncontested. She was term-limited in 2016.

While in the legislature, Joyner worked with State Representative Larry Ahern, a Republican, to author legislation that would make prosecuting identity theft easier by eliminating a legal requirement that the stolen personal information be used fraudulently. She strongly opposed legislation passed by the legislature that expedited the execution of inmates on death row, saying, "Is swift justice fair justice? We have seen cases where, years later, convicted people were exonerated." During the confirmation process for Public Service Commissioner Lisa Edgar, Joyner lead a bipartisan coalition of Senators to support her in her nomination for a third term, praising her for having "a reputation for character and integrity," and rejecting claims made by the opposition that she was too friendly with utility companies.

For the 2014–2016 legislative term, Joyner was elected by her colleagues to serve as the floor leader of the Senate Democrats.
