= Perry Thurston =

American politician

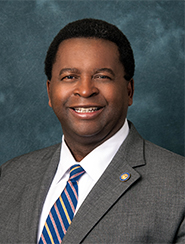

Member of the Florida Senate from the 33rd district
- In office November 8, 2016 – January 10, 2022
- Preceded by: Redistricted
- Succeeded by: Rosalind Osgood

Minority Leader of the Florida House of Representatives
- In office November 20, 2012 – November 18, 2014
- Preceded by: Ron Saunders
- Succeeded by: Mark Pafford

Member of the Florida House of Representatives
- In office November 6, 2006 – November 4, 2014
- Preceded by: Chris Smith
- Succeeded by: Bobby DuBose
- Constituency: 93rd district (2006–2012); 94th district (2012–2014)

Personal details
- Born: Perry Eugene Thurston Jr. January 30, 1961 (age 65) Pompano Beach, Florida, U.S.
- Party: Democratic
- Spouse: Dawn Board
- Children: 2
- Education: Morehouse College (BS); University of Miami (JD)

Perry Eugene Thurston Jr. (born January 30, 1961) is an American lawyer and politician who served as a member of the Florida Senate from 2016 to 2022. He represented the 33rd district, which includes Lauderhill, Lauderdale Lakes, North Lauderdale, Margate, Oakland Park, and surrounding areas in Broward County. He previously served four terms in the Florida House of Representatives, representing the Fort Lauderdale area from 2006 to 2014, and was the House minority leader in his final term. Thurston was an unsuccessful candidate for the Democratic nomination for Attorney General of Florida in 2014.

== Early life and education ==
Thurston was born in Pompano Beach and attended Morehouse College in Atlanta, Georgia, where he graduated with a Bachelor of Science degree in finance in 1982. After graduation, he returned to Florida, where he worked in banking until he decided to attend the University of Miami School of Law, where he graduated in 1987.

== Career ==
After graduating from law school, Thurston worked for the Broward County Public Defender's Office for four years, and then began working in private practice as a defense attorney.

=== Florida House of Representatives ===
When State Representative M. Mandy Dawson did not seek re-election in 1998, making a successful run for the Florida Senate instead, Thurston ran to succeed her in the 93rd District. In the Democratic primary, he faced Chris Smith, Hazel K. Armbrister, and Fred Segal. Smith placed first in the primary, but he did not win a majority, so he and Thurston, the second-place finisher, advanced to a runoff election, which Smith easily won.

In 2006, Smith could not seek re-election, and Thurston ran to succeed him in the 93rd District. Against Alain Valias-Jean, Randy Smith, Sallie Tillman-Watson, and McKinley Williams II, Thurston won the Democratic primary with 43% of the vote. In the general election, he crushed his opponent, independent candidate Nick Sakhnovsky, with 82% of the vote. Thurston was re-elected in 2008 and 2010 without opposition.

When Florida House of Representatives districts were redrawn in 2012, Thurston was redistricted into the 94th District, which included most of the territory that he had previously represented in the 93rd District. He won the Democratic nomination without an opponent, and was opposed by Republican nominee Scott Herman in the general election. The South Florida Sun-Sentinel endorsed Thurston for re-election, praising him as "an advocate for those issues important to his district and his party...education, economic development, and criminal justice issues." In the end, Thurston won in a landslide with 84% of the vote to secure his final term in the House.

During the 2012-2014 term, Thurston served as Minority Leader of the Florida House of Representatives. In that capacity, he played a critical role in the controversy over the proposed Medicaid expansion as provided for by the Patient Protection and Affordable Care Act, joining to support Governor Rick Scott's proposal to take "more than $50 billion from the federal government over the next decade," which would allow "an estimated 1.1 million low-income Floridians to purchase private insurance." Owing to the refusal by Republicans to consider the proposal, Thurston engaged in a series of legislative maneuvers to slow down the session, "relying on a parliamentary tactic that requires a full reading of all House bills ready for floor votes," which caused Will Weatherford, the Speaker of the Florida House of Representatives to use an automated bill reader named "Mary" to speed-read through the bills. When the legislative session drew to a close without a decision on the Medicaid expansion, Democrats, including Thurston, joined forces to urge Governor Scott to call a special session to resolve the issue. However, despite the battle over health care, he did not engage in a protracted fight over the budget, declaring, "There will be some [Democrats] who will be voting for the budget, and they'll have legitimate reasons to vote for it, which I think are legitimate reasons."

=== 2014 Attorney General campaign ===
In late 2012, Thurston confirmed that he was considering running against Republican Attorney General of Florida Pam Bondi in 2014, and at the annual convention of the Florida Democratic Party in October 2013, he announced that he was running, declaring, "I will be a candidate for attorney general in November 2014. I look at the attorney general's position as the people's attorney, and I think that we need, Florida can do better. I think we need an attorney general who's going to focus on health care needs of Florida citizens, not necessarily some national agenda." Thurston, however, is also a candidate for the Florida Senate in 2016, when State Senator Chris Smith is term-limited. When asked about how his Senate candidacy impacts his attorney general campaign, he said, "I will not be running for the Senate once I win this election in 2014," but, when asked about whether he would run for the Senate if he loses, noted, "I have not made a decision about that, but I fully expect to win in 2014."

He faced George Sheldon, who had most recently served as the Assistant Secretary for the Administration for Children and Families in the United States Department of Health and Human Services, in the Democratic primary. Thurston campaigned on his support for protecting consumers, expanding individual rights, and increasing government oversight, specifically criticizing Bondi for her opposition to the Patient Protection and Affordable Care Act, the restoration of felons' civil rights, medical marijuana, and marriage equality. He argued, "There would have been a time when she would have defended the fact that I couldn't get married to [some women] because we're not of the same race." Despite the fact that neither Thurston nor Sheldon raised very much money in the primary, Thurston emphasized his support for voting rights and his opposition to suing President Barack Obama in radio advertisements that he aired targeting African-American voters. Ultimately, Sheldon defeated Thurston handily in the primary, winning 61% of the vote to Thurston's 39%.

=== Florida Senate ===
In 2016, Thurston ran for the Florida Senate seat vacated by Chris Smith, who was term-limited. He was elected without primary or general election opposition. Thurston was scheduled to succeed Gary Farmer as minority leader of the Florida Senate in the 2022–2024 legislative session. With Thurston announcing a run for Congress in the special election for Alcee Hastings's seat, Democrats chose Lauren Book to lead Senate Democrats in Tallahassee. Due to Florida's resign to run laws, Thurston will be forced to resign from the Florida Senate in order to run for Congress. On July 27, 2021, Thurston announced his resignation from the Florida Senate, effective January 10, 2022.

=== 2022 congressional special election ===
After incumbent representative Alcee Hastings died of pancreatic cancer, Thurston announced that he would run to succeed him in a special election.

Florida House of Representatives
Preceded by Chris Smith	Member of the Florida House of Representatives from the 93rd district 2006–2012	Succeeded by George Moraitis
Preceded by Hazelle P. Rogers	Member of the Florida House of Representatives from the 94th district 2012–2014	Succeeded by Bobby DuBose
Preceded by Ron Saunders	Minority Leader of the Florida House of Representatives; 2012–2014	Succeeded by Mark Pafford
Florida Senate
Preceded by Eleanor Sobel	Member of the Florida Senate from the 33rd district 2016–present	Incumbent
