= Elaine Schwartz =

American politician (born 1943)

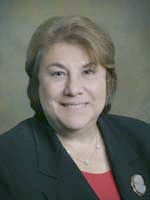

Member of the Florida House of Representatives from the 99th district
- In office November 21, 2006 – November 18, 2014
- Preceded by: Eleanor Sobel
- Succeeded by: Evan Jenne

Personal details
- Born: April 13, 1943 (age 83) New York City, New York, U.S.
- Citizenship: United States
- Party: Democratic
- Education: Hofstra University (B.A.); New York University School of Law (J.D.)
- Profession: Attorney

Elaine Schwartz (born April 13, 1943) is a Democratic politician who served as a member of the Florida House of Representatives, representing the 99th District, which includes most of Hollywood in southern Broward County, from 2006 to 2014.

== History ==
Schwartz was born in New York City and attended Hofstra University, from which she graduated in 1964 with a degree in history. Following graduation, she attended the New York University School of Law, receiving her Juris Doctor in 1968. She worked for the Federal Reserve Bank of New York as an attorney before moving to Florida in 1980. Schwartz gained employment as an Assistant City Attorney in Hollywood, where she lives. Prior to her election to the legislature, she served on the Hollywood Housing Authority as the Vice-Chair and as a Commissioner.

== Florida House of Representatives ==
When incumbent State Representative Eleanor Sobel was unable to seek re-election in 2006, Schwartz ran to succeed her in the 99th District, which stretched from Pembroke Pines to Hollywood in southern Broward County. She ran in the Democratic primary to succeed Sobel, winning 50% of the vote against Arthur Palamara and Barry Sacharow. In the general election, Schwartz defeated Republican nominee Juan Selaya in a landslide, receiving 75% of the vote to Selaya's 25%. She was re-elected without opposition in 2008 and 2010.

In 2012, following the reconfiguration of Florida House Districts, Schwartz was kept in the 99th District, which maintained most of the territory that she previously represented. She won her party's nomination unopposed and faced Republican nominee Elizabeth Eddy in the general election. Schwartz was endorsed by the Sun-Sentinel, which praised her for being "a voice for children, working families, and women's issues during her time in the Florida Legislature," and the Miami Herald, which identified her support for expanding the Nursing Home Diversion Program, resulting in the opening of "thousands of new slots" for the disabled elderly to "stay in their homes or assisted living facilities." Ultimately, Schwartz was re-elected in a landslide to her final term in the legislature over Eddy, winning 66% of the vote.
