= Suzanne Gunzburger =

American politician (1939–2026)

Suzanne N. "Sue" Gunzburger
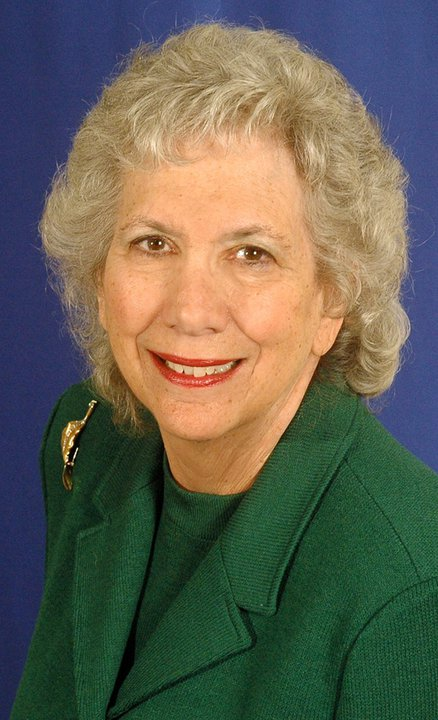

Personal details
- Born: July 12, 1939 Buffalo, New York, U.S.
- Died: March 1, 2026 (aged 86) Hollywood, Florida, U.S.
- Party: Democratic
- Spouse: Gerard Gunzburger (1931–2009)
- Children: 3
- Occupation: Broward County commissioner; social worker; teacher

Suzanne N. "Sue" Gunzburger (July 12, 1939 – March 1, 2026) was an American activist who was long-term elected official in Broward County, Florida, known for her work in support of environmental preservation, social services, public funding of the arts, LGBT equality, and adoption of the Broward County Ethics Code.

== Education and early community activism ==
Gunzburger received her bachelor's degree in education from Wayne State University and her Master of Social Work degree from Barry University.

Originally a public school teacher, Gunzburger became a social worker and family therapist in the 1970s. She was also a long-time community and political activist who was appointed by President Jimmy Carter as a delegate to the White House Conference on Families in 1980.

== Political career ==
In 1982, Gunzburger was elected to the Hollywood (Florida) City Commission. She was re-elected in 1986 and 1990 and served on the Commission for ten years.

In 1992, Gunzburger resigned from the Commission in order to run in a special election for Broward County Commissioner. While initially viewed as an underdog, she finished first by a comfortable margin over her three opponents in the Democratic primary, and won the Democratic primary run-off by defeating Broward County School Board member Don Samuels. Gunzburger went on to defeat municipal official Kurt Volcker (Republican) by a wide margin in the 1992 general election.

Gunzburger was re-elected in a landslide margin in 1994 over veteran J.D. Fredericks (Republican) and was subsequently re-elected without opposition in 1998, 2002 and 2006. In 2010, she faced a tough primary challenge from the former Florida Senate Democratic Leader Steve Geller. After a hotly contested, costly, and largely negative race, Gunzburger defeated Geller by a 56.5% to 43.5% vote. She went on to win the 2010 general election by an 84-16 margin. Gunzburger was term-limited in 2014 and announced retirement from elected office.

When Gunzburger retired in November 2014, she tied the late Gerald F. Thompson's record for being the longest serving county commissioner in Broward County history. Both Thompson (served 1974-1996) and Gunzburger (served 1992-2014) served 22 years apiece on the County Commission. With Broward County's adoption of 12-year term limits, no future Broward County Commissioner will be able to tie or break this record. During tenure on the County Commission, Gunzburger was also at various times Commission Vice Chair (1993–94 and 1998–99), Commission Chair (1994–95 and 1999-2000), Broward County Vice Mayor (2009–10) and Broward County Mayor (2010–11).

Gunzburger was also a founding member of the governing body of the Broward County Children's Services Council, an independent taxing district, from its creation in 2000 until her retirement in 2014.

== 2000 presidential recount ==
Gunzburger is perhaps best known from her role in the 2000 Florida election recount. She was one of the three members on the Broward County Canvass Board. She received several death threats and thousands of emails (both supportive and hostile) during the recount.

Gunzburger was also named as a defendant in one of the lawsuits filed by the George W. Bush campaign in its attempt to halt the recount. For her efforts in the 2000 recount, the Broward County Democratic Party gave Gunzburger its "Democrat of the Year" award in 2001.

== Personal life and death ==
Gunzburger was married for 49 years to Gerard J. Gunzburger until his death in 2009. He was a Holocaust survivor, chemist, inventor, and plastics manufacturing executive. Gunzburger had three children:

Ron Gunzburger - retired Senior Advisor to Maryland Governor Larry Hogan and the Governor’s Director of Covid-19 Response Strategy during the pandemic, former general counsel/senior commander at the Broward County (Florida) Sheriff’s Office, and founder/publisher of the Politics1.com website.
Cindy Katz, a teaching assistant, who is a mother of three in New York.
Judy Gunzburger, who works in South Florida as an educator in the correctional system.

Gunzburger died on March 1, 2026, at the age of 86. She was Jewish, and a longtime board member of Temple Beth El of Hollywood.
