= Howard Forman (politician) =

American politician (1946–2023)

Member of the Florida Senate from the 32nd district
- In office 1989–2000
- Preceded by: Ken Jenne
- Succeeded by: Debbie Wasserman Schultz

Personal details
- Born: January 6, 1946 Pittsburgh, Pennsylvania, U.S.
- Died: October 12, 2023 (aged 77) Pembroke Pines, Florida, U.S.
- Party: Democratic
- Spouse: Susan Schwartzman
- Children: 2 (and two stepchildren)
- Occupation: marketing consultant

Howard C. Forman (January 6, 1946 – October 12, 2023) was an American politician in the state of Florida.

Forman was born in Pittsburgh and came to Florida in 1955. He was a marketing consultant. He served in the Florida State Senate from 1989 to 2000 (district 32), as a member of the Democratic Party. Forman died on October 12, 2023, at the age of 77.
