= James A. Scott =

American politician

James Alexander Scott
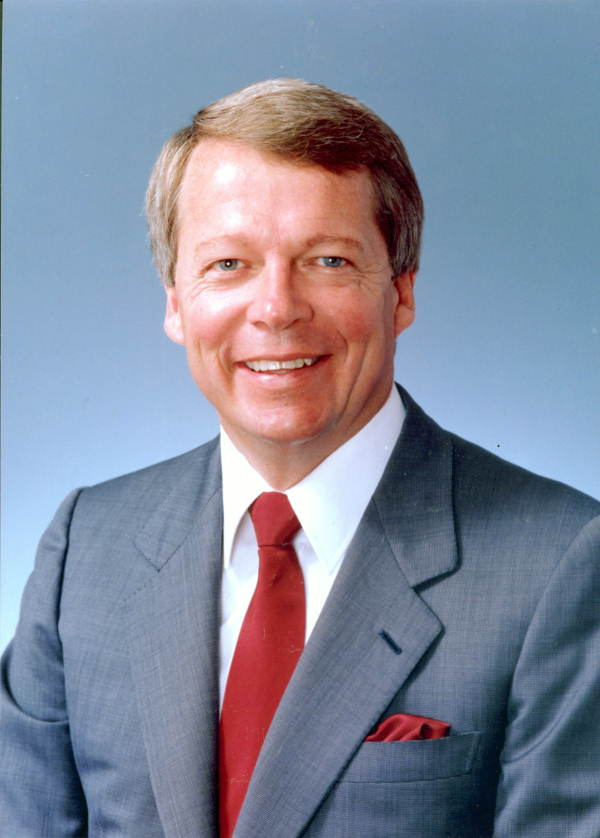

Member of the Broward County Commission from the 4th district
- In office December 12, 2000 – November 19, 2006
- Preceded by: Scott Cowan
- Succeeded by: Ken Keechl

President of the Florida Senate
- In office November 22, 1994 – November 19, 1996
- Preceded by: Pat Thomas
- Succeeded by: Toni Jennings

Member of the Florida Senate from the 31st district
- In office November 16, 1976 – November 21, 2000
- Preceded by: David C. Lane
- Succeeded by: Debby Sanderson

Personal details
- Born: January 14, 1942 (age 84) Pikeville, Kentucky, U.S.
- Party: Republican
- Spouse: Janice Ann Suskey (m. 1966; died 2004) Ginger Wetherell (m. 2020)
- Children: 2
- Education: University of Kentucky (BA, JD)

James A. "Jim" Scott (born January 14, 1942) is a former member of the Florida Senate and former member of the member of the Broward County Commission. He is a member of the Republican Party.

Scott was born in Pikeville, Kentucky. He attended the University of Kentucky, where he earned his BA and JD.

Scott was a founding partner of the Tripp Scott law firm and is Chairman Emeritus. The firm is associated with the Republican Party of Florida.

In 1976, Scott was elected to the Florida Senate. In 1994, he became President of the Florida Senate. He left the State Senate in 2000.

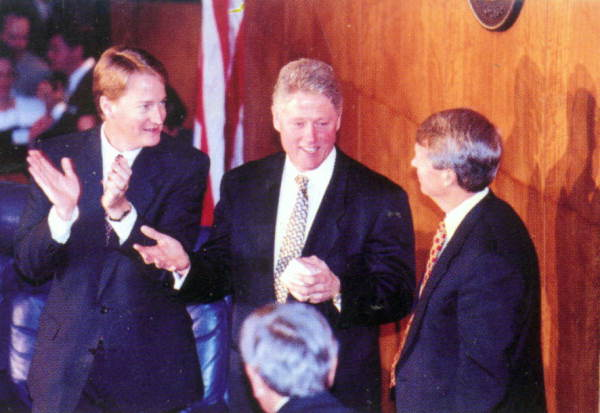
Scott with President Bill Clinton and Speaker Peter R. Wallace in 1995

On December 12, 2000, Governor Jeb Bush appointed Scott to the Broward County Commission. He replaced Scott Cowan. His term expired on November 19, 2006, after he lost reelection to Ken Keechl.

After Mel Martínez resigned from the U.S. Senate in 2009, Governor Charlie Crist considered appointing Scott to fill the remainder of the vacancy. Ultimately, the position went to George LeMieux.

Florida Senate
Preceded by David C. Lane	Member of the Florida Senate from the 31st district 1976–2000	Succeeded by Debby Sanderson
Political offices
Preceded by Pat Thomas	President of the Florida Senate; 1994–1996	Succeeded by Toni Jennings
Preceded by Scott Cowan	Member of the Broward County Commission from the 4th district 2000–2006	Succeeded by Ken Keechl
