= Daryl Campbell (politician) =

American politician

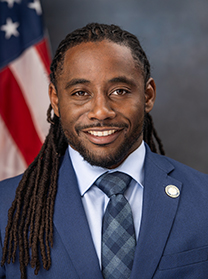

Member of the Florida House of Representatives from the 99th district
- Incumbent
- Assumed office January 31, 2022
- Preceded by: Bobby DuBose

Personal details
- Born: May 29, 1986 (age 40) New Rochelle, New York, U.S.
- Party: Democratic
- Education: Jacksonville University; Barry University
- Website: darylcampbell.org

Daryl Campbell (born May 29, 1986) is an American politician. He serves as a Democratic member for the 99th district of the Florida House of Representatives.

Born in New Rochelle, New York. Campbell attended Jacksonville University, where he earned his bachelor's degree based on social work in 2010. He then attended Barry University, where he earned his master's degree in 2017. Campbell settled in Fort Lauderdale, Florida. In 2022, he won the election for the 94th district of the Florida House of Representatives, in which Campbell was against Josephus Eggelletion III, Elijah Manley and Rod Kemp. He succeeded Bobby DuBose. Campbell assumed his office on January 31, 2022.

== Political career ==
=== 2022 special election ===
In 2022, Campbell won a special election to succeed Democrat Bobby DuBose, who resigned in an unsuccessful attempt to run for Congress. After the election, there was a brief controversy over whether the Speaker of the House at the time, Chris Sprowls, would seat Campbell. Sprowls had previously hinted that he would wait until the March certification of the election, which would come after the state's legislative session had ended. The controversy was resolved when Campbell was seated on January 31.

The special election was for House District 94. Following decennial redistricting, Campbell came to represent House District 99 after winning re-election in 2022.

=== Tenure ===
In the 2022 legislative session, Campbell arrived after the bill filing deadline and was not permitted to file his own bills, per House rules.

==== 2023 legislative session ====
In 2023, Campbell passed his first bill, relating to sickle cell disease. The bill requires the Agency for Health Care Administration (AHCA) to review and report, every two years, the same information it was required to report in the Fiscal Year 2022-23 General Appropriations Act (GAA). AHCA must also evaluate the existing Medicaid payment methods for sickle cell disease (SCD) treatments and medications provided in hospitals. If these payment methods create barriers to access, AHCA must assess whether they can be improved or changed to make treatment more accessible.

==== 2024 legislative session ====
In 2024, he passed another bill. HB 975 creates a new category for “persons with lived experience,” allowing individuals who have experienced homelessness to apply for jobs with the State Office or a Continuum of Care (CoC) organization through a modified background check process.

== Electoral history ==
Campbell was first elected in a 2022 special election and was reelected to a full two-year term in 2022 and again in 2024.

He has previously been endorsed by the Florida Medical Association, Florida Nurses Association, Broward Young Democrats, SEIU Florida, the South Florida Sun Sentinel and the Metro Broward Firefighters.

== Allegations of harassment ==
In November 2024, Campbell was accused of sexual harassment by his former legislative aide. The aide, Athena Guice, claimed that while working as a District aide in the Florida House, Campbell asked her to sleep in the same room with him during business trips, and making several advances on her. Guice also accused Campbell of retaliation following her coming forward. Campbell denied the allegations in a statement provided to the Miami New Times.
