= Shadeville High School =

High school in Florida

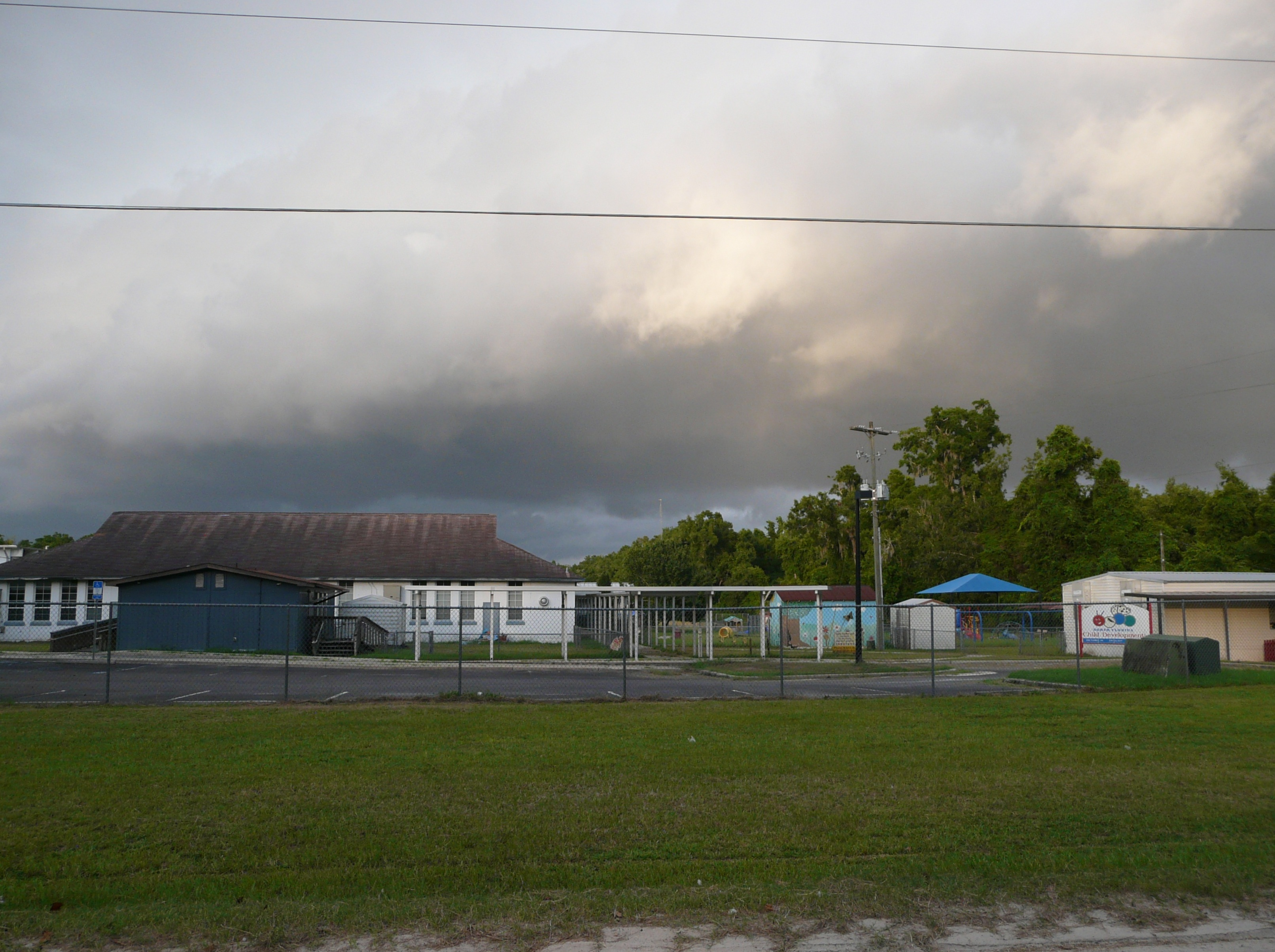
Wakulla Educational Center on the old Shadeville High School site

Shadeville High School was located at 87 Andrew Hargrett, Sr., Road, Shadeville, Florida, 6 miles (9.7 km) east of Crawfordville, Florida. It was built in 1931 and was the first and only high school for black people in Wakulla County, Florida. It was closed with school desegregation in 1967, when a new Wakulla High School was built. The building was demolished; there is a historical marker. Shadeville Elementary School continues operating.

Andrew J. Hargrett, Sr. helped establish the school.

A historical marker commemorates the school.
