= Dick Clark (Florida politician) =

American politician (1933–2019)

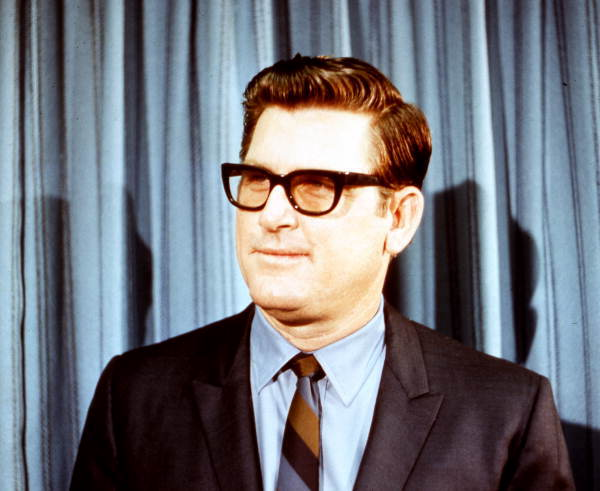

Member of the Florida House of Representatives for the 93rd district
- In office 1968–1976

Personal details
- Born: Richard Wayne Clark; May 9, 1933 San Antonio, Texas, U.S.
- Died: October 5, 2019 (aged 86) Johns Creek, Georgia, U.S.
- Party: Democratic
- Spouse: Diane LaPrade
- Children: Lisa Marie, Richard, Christina, and Caryn
- Relatives: Stephen P. Clark (brother)
- Education: Loyola University
- Occupation: general contractor

Richard Wayne Clark (May 9, 1933 – October 5, 2019) was an American politician from Florida who served as a member of the Florida House of Representatives in the 93rd district from 1968 to 1976 He was a member of the Democratic Party.

Clark was born in San Antonio, Texas. He moved to Florida at the age of four and later attended Loyola University, where he was a member of Upsilon Beta Lambda. He served in the Florida House of Representatives from 1968 to 1976 as a Democrat. He also served as Majority Leader of the Florida House of Representatives towards the end of his term.

He was a general contractor by profession. He was the brother of Miami mayor Stephen P. Clark. Clark died on October 5, 2019.
