= Chris Smith (Florida politician) =

American politician (born 1970)

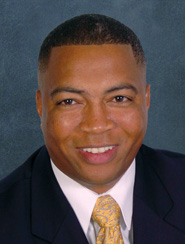

Minority Leader of the Florida Senate
- In office November 20, 2012 – November 18, 2014
- Preceded by: Nan Rich
- Succeeded by: Arthenia Joyner

Member of the Florida Senate
- In office November 4, 2008 – November 8, 2016
- Preceded by: M. Mandy Dawson
- Succeeded by: Jeff Clemens (redistricted)
- Constituency: 29th district (2008-2014); 31st district (2014–2016)

Member of the Florida House of Representatives from the 93rd district
- In office November 3, 1998 – November 7, 2006
- Preceded by: M. Mandy Dawson
- Succeeded by: Perry Thurston

Personal details
- Born: March 15, 1970 (age 56) Fort Lauderdale, Florida, U.S.
- Party: Democratic
- Spouse: Desorae Giles-Smith
- Children: Christopher Leveorn Smith, Christian Nicholas Giles Smith
- Education: Johnson C. Smith University (BS); Florida State University (JD)
- Profession: Attorney

Christopher L. Smith (born March 15, 1970, in Fort Lauderdale, Florida) was a Democratic member of the Florida Senate, who represented the 31st District, which includes eastern Broward County since 2012.

== History ==
Smith attended Johnson C. Smith University in Charlotte, North Carolina, where he received a degree in political science. He participated in Model United Nations while in college, even traveling to Moscow, Russia to participate in the International Model United Nations in 1990. Following his undergraduate work, he attended Florida State University, where he graduated with a Juris Doctor in 1995. He started working for the law firm Johnson, Anselmo, Murdoch, Burke & George, P.A., where he currently works.

Many critics argue Smith's employment with Johnson, Anselmo, Murdoch, Burke & George, P.A. has led to conflicts in interest during his career in the State Senate: previously serving as a lobbyist for Florida Power & Light (FP&L), Smith protested the confirmation of two former Florida Public Service Commission (FPSC) commissioners while serving as State Senator. Although he claimed his reservation for their confirmation was in an effort to increase diversity, it is arguably suspicious that these two commissioners had just denied FP&L's bid for their largest rate increase in history. In 1995, he was appointed to the Fort Lauderdale Planning and Zoning Board.

== Florida House of Representatives ==
Following the decision by Democratic State Representative M. Mandy Dawson to run for the Florida State Senate rather than seek re-election, Smith ran to succeed her. Smith faced Perry Thurston, Hazel K. Armbrister, and Fred Segal in the Democratic primary, which was opened to the entire electorate because all of the candidates were Democrats. Although Smith came in first place with 47% of the vote, the fact that he did not attain an outright majority of the vote mandated a run-off election between Smith and Thurston, the second-place finisher, which he won in a landslide, receiving 58 percent of the vote. He was unopposed in the general election, and was re-elected without opposition in 2002.

In 2004, Smith faced Sallie Tillman-Watson in the Democratic primary, but he turned away her challenge easily. He was re-elected to his final term in the general election without opposition. From 2004 to 2006, he served as the Minority Leader of the Florida House of Representatives.

== Florida Senate ==
In 2008, when State Senator M. Mandy Dawson was unable to seek another term due to term limits, Smith ran to succeed her in the 29th District, which includes parts of Broward County and Palm Beach County. In the Democratic primary, Smith defeated Earlen C. Smiley, the Deputy Superintendent of the Broward County School Board; Michael E. Carn; and Terry A. Williams Edden in a landslide. In the general election, he was elected without opposition. When Florida Senate districts were reconfigured, Smith was drawn into the 31st District and ran for re-election there. He faced Republican Chris Smithmyer, who was recruited by the Republican Party of Florida to run in Smith's district due to his similar-sounding name.

Smith was endorsed for re-election by the South Florida Sun-Sentinel, which praised him for becoming "the lead advocate for issues dear to Senate Democrats, from closing corporate tax loopholes to providing more state funding to make higher education more accessible and affordable." In the end, Smith was overwhelmingly re-elected over Smithmyer, receiving 84% of the vote. For the 2012-2014 legislative term, Smith served as the Senate Democratic Leader, and, by virtue of the fact that his party was in the minority, the Minority Leader of the Senate.

== 2016 Broward County Commission, District 9 Election ==
Chris Smith fell short of beating incumbent Broward County Commissioner Dale Holness in the race for the District 9 seat, by 385 votes.

2016 District 9 Broward County Commission Election
Party	Candidate	Votes	%
Democratic	Dale Holness	10,264	50.9
Democratic	Chris L. Smith	9,879	49.0

Florida House of Representatives
Preceded by M. Mandy Dawson	Member of the Florida House of Representatives from the 93rd district 1998–2006	Succeeded by Perry Thurston
Florida Senate
Preceded by M. Mandy Dawson	Member of the Florida Senate from the 29th district 2008–2012	Succeeded by Jeremy Ring
Preceded by Eleanor Sobel	Member of the Florida Senate from the 31st district 2012–2016	Succeeded by Jeff Clemens
Preceded by Nan Rich	Minority Leader of the Florida Senate; 2012–2014	Succeeded by Arthenia Joyner
