= Steven Geller =

American politician (born 1958)

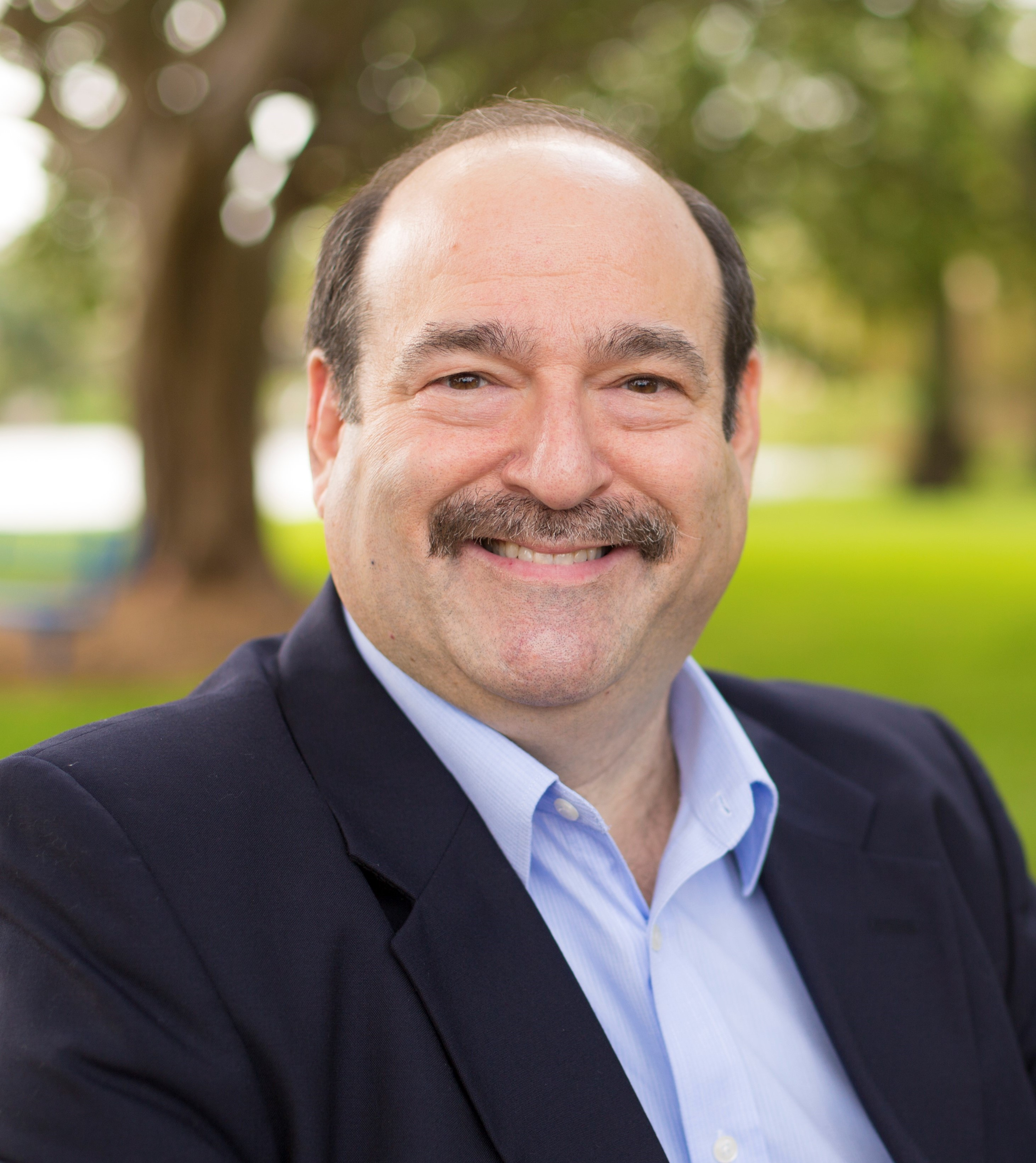

Member of the Broward County Commission from the 5th district
- Incumbent
- Assumed office November 22, 2016
- Preceded by: Lois Wexler

Minority Leader of the Florida Senate
- In office November 21, 2006 – November 4, 2008
- Preceded by: Les Miller
- Succeeded by: Al Lawson

Member of the Florida Senate
- In office March 17, 1998 – November 4, 2008
- Preceded by: Ken Jenne
- Succeeded by: Eleanor Sobel
- Constituency: 29th district (1998–2002); 31st district (2002–2008)

Member of the Florida House of Representatives
- In office November 8, 1988 – March 17, 1998
- Preceded by: Irma Rochlin
- Succeeded by: Kenneth Gottlieb
- Constituency: 98th district (1988–1992); 101st district (1992–1998)

Personal details
- Born: November 4, 1958 (age 67) The Bronx, New York City, New York, U.S.
- Party: Democratic
- Spouse: Laurel Leffler
- Children: 2
- Education: Florida State University (BA, JD)

Steven Anthony Geller (born November 4, 1958) is an American attorney and politician who serves on the Broward County Commission for District 5. As of November 2020, Geller was the mayor of Broward County from November 2020 till November 2021. He was the former vice mayor from November 2019 until November 2020.

== Early life and education ==
Geller was born in The Bronx and moved to Florida with his family in 1965. He graduated high school from Miami Coral Park Senior High School. He received a Bachelor of Arts degree in history in 1979 and a Juris Doctor in 1982, both from Florida State University.

== Career ==
=== Law ===
Geller is an actively practicing attorney. He was a shareholder at the national law firm of Greenspoon Marder, and is the principal of Geller Law Firm, P.A., where he practices in the areas of zoning and land use, gaming law, lobbying and administrative law, first party property insurance law, and commercial litigation. He has been practicing law since 1982, is A-V rated by Martindale Hubbell, has been listed in Florida Superlawyers, South Florida's Best Lawyers, and the Bar Register of Distinguished Attorneys. He is of-counsel to the law firm of Sachs Sax Caplan.

=== Politics and government ===
A Democrat, he previously served in the Florida Legislature from 1988 to 2008. He was a member of the Florida House of Representatives from 1988 through 1998. He was elected to the Florida Senate in a special election in 1998, and re-elected until term limits forced his retirement in 2008. He served as Senate Minority (Democratic) Leader from 2006 to 2008. Geller was appointed by different Republican Senate presidents as a committee chair in 2000 and again in 2002. Geller also served as the Democratic ranking member on numerous committees, and co-chaired the Select Committee on Property Insurance Accountability.

He served as chair of the South Florida Regional Planning Council for more than 3 terms, on the board of directors of the Florida Association of Counties, as chair of the Broward County Water Advisory Board, and on the Broward County Cultural Council. Geller was first elected to the Broward County Commission in 2016, and was re-elected without opposition in 2020 and 2024.

Geller served as a national leader in several different legislative organizations. He served on many committees and as national president of both the National Conference of Insurance Legislators (NCOIL) and the National Council of Legislators from Gaming States (NCLGS). Geller also served as Chairman of the National Public Sector Gaming Study Commission. Geller currently serves as the pro bono General Counsel of NCLGS.

Geller served and serves on many Democratic organizations. He was a superdelegate to the Democratic National Convention in 2008. He served as parliamentarian of the Florida Democratic Party from 1982 to 1996 and as state president of the Florida Young Democrats in 1980–1981. He currently serves on the state executive committee of the Florida Democratic Party. He also serves as chair of the Real Solutions Caucus, a group of approximately 35 current and former Broward County Democratic elected officials.

He is a past chairman of the board of the Holocaust Documentation & Education Center (HDEC).

== Personal life ==
He is married to Laurel Geller (née Leffler) and has two sons.

Florida House of Representatives
| Preceded by Irma Rochlin | Member of the Florida House of Representatives from the 98th district 1988–1992 | Succeeded by Steven B. Feren |
| Preceded by Mike Abrams | Member of the Florida House of Representatives from the 101st district 1992–1998 | Succeeded by Kenneth Gottlieb |
Florida Senate
| Preceded by Ken Jenne | Member of the Florida Senate from the 29th district 1998–2002 | Succeeded by M. Mandy Dawson |
| Preceded by Debby Sanderson | Member of the Florida Senate from the 31st district 2002–2008 | Succeeded by Eleanor Sobel |
| Preceded by Les Miller | Minority Leader of the Florida Senate; 2006–2008 | Succeeded by Al Lawson |
Political offices
| Preceded by Lois Wexler | Member of the Broward County Commission from the 5th district 2016–present | Incumbent |
| Preceded by Dale Holness | Vice Mayor of Broward County; 2019–2020 | Succeeded by Michael Udine |
| Preceded by Dale Holness | Mayor of Broward County; 2020–present | Incumbent |
