= Irma Rochlin =

American politician (1924–2025)

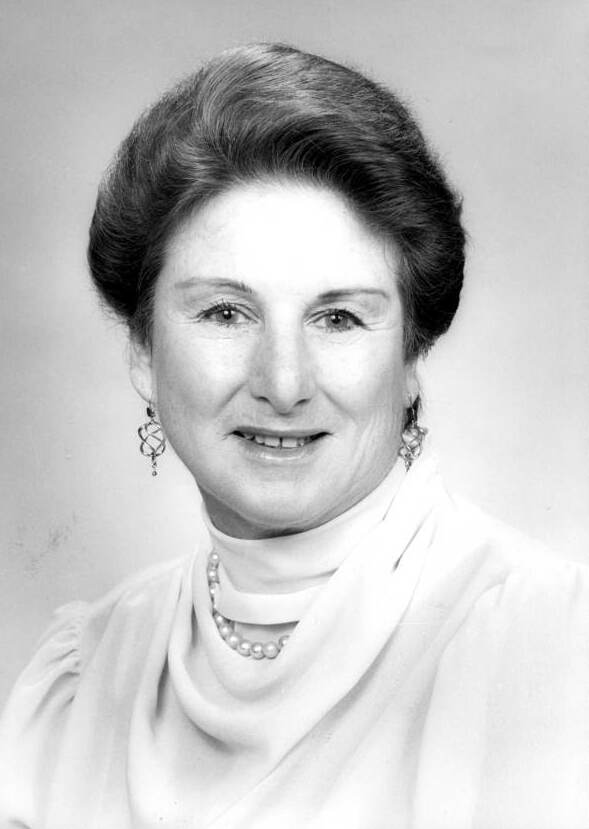

Member of the Florida House of Representatives from the 98th district
- In office 1984–1988

Personal details
- Born: Irma Sally Silverstein; April 28, 1924 New York City, U.S.
- Died: February 14, 2025 (aged 100) Miami Beach, Florida, U.S.
- Party: Democratic
- Spouse: Larry Rochlin

Irma Sally Rochlin (née Silverstein; April 28, 1924 – February 14, 2025) was an American nurse and politician in the state of Florida.

== Background ==
Irma Silverstein was born on April 28, 1924, in Brooklyn, New York City, and later moved to Florida in 1935. She studied nursing at Johns Hopkins University, graduating in 1945. Upon completing her studies, she served in the U.S. Army Nurse Corps, making the grade of Lieutenant.

She married Larry Rochlin in 1947. The couple had four daughters. She died in Miami Beach, Florida, on February 14, 2025, at the age of 100.

== Political career ==
Rochlin served in the Florida House of Representatives from 1984 to 1988 for district 98. She was a member of the Democratic Party.
