= M. Mandy Dawson =

American politician

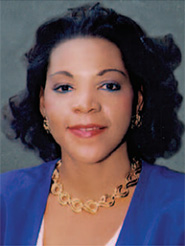

Member of the Florida Senate
- In office November 3, 1998 – November 4, 2008
- Preceded by: Matthew Meadows (30th); Steven Geller (29th)
- Succeeded by: Ron Klein (30th); Chris Smith (29th)
- Constituency: 30th district (1998–2002); 29th district (2002–2008)

Member of the Florida House of Representatives from the 93rd district
- In office November 3, 1992 – November 3, 1998
- Preceded by: Debby Sanderson
- Succeeded by: Chris Smith

Personal details
- Born: Muriel Mandy Dawson; July 18, 1956 (age 70) Fort Lauderdale, Florida, U.S.
- Party: Democratic
- Spouse: Hobson Bethune (m. 2010; died 2017)
- Education: Barry University (BS)

M. Mandy Dawson (née Muriel Mandy Dawson; July 18, 1956) was a Democratic member of the Florida Senate, representing the 29th District from 1999 to 2008. Previously she was a member of the Florida House of Representatives from 1993 through 1998.

== Early life and education ==
Dawson was born in Fort Lauderdale and moved to Daytona Beach when she was six years old. She attended Florida A&M University from 1975 to 1980 and earned a Bachelor of Science degree in social work from Barry University.

== Career ==
She was the first African-American female elected to the Florida Legislature from Broward County. During her time in the legislature, she worked on bills restoring civil rights for ex-offenders, penalties for leaving children in locked cars, and keeping Black physicians on managed care panels to address health care inequalities. Since leaving office, she has worked as a political campaign manager.

== Personal life ==
She married Hobson Bethune, a retired Marine and longtime youth athletics coach, in 2010. Bethune died in 2017.

Mandy Dawson suffered from chronic back pain requiring hospitalization and surgery. She later became addicted to prescription drugs. In 2002, Dawson was arrested and charged with felony prescription drug fraud for altering a painkiller prescription from 60 pills to 160. In return for dismissal of the charges, she entered a pretrial intervention program.

On July 20, 2011, Dawson was charged with federal income tax evasion and failure to file tax returns. In court papers filed in early February 2012, Dawson signaled her intention to plead guilty to the tax evasion charges.

Florida House of Representatives
Preceded by Debby Sanderson	Member of the Florida House of Representatives from the 93rd district 1992–1998	Succeeded by Chris Smith
Florida Senate
Preceded by Matthew Meadows	Member of the Florida Senate from the 30th district 1998–2002	Succeeded by Ron Klein
Preceded by Steven Geller	Member of the Florida Senate from the 29th district 2002–2008	Succeeded by Chris Smith
