= Joseph Gibbons (Florida politician) =

American politician (born 1948)

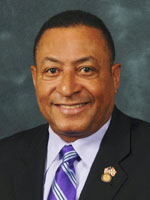

Member of the Florida House of Representatives from the 100th district
- In office November 6, 2012 – November 4, 2014
- Preceded by: Evan Jenne
- Succeeded by: Joe Geller

Member of the Florida House of Representatives from the 105th district
- In office November 7, 2006 – November 6, 2012
- Preceded by: Kenneth Gottlieb
- Succeeded by: Carlos Trujillo

Personal details
- Born: September 23, 1948 (age 78) New York City, New York, U.S.
- Citizenship: United States
- Party: Democratic
- Education: Calvin College (B.A.); John Jay College of Criminal Justice (M.P.A.)
- Profession: Businessman

Joseph A. "Joe" Gibbons (born September 23, 1948) is a Democratic politician who served as a member of the Florida House of Representatives from 2006 to 2014, representing the 105th District from 2006 to 2012 and the 100th District, which includes eastern Broward County and eastern Miami-Dade County, from 2012 to 2014.

== History ==
Gibbons was born in New York City and attended Calvin College, where he graduated with a degree in general studies in 1970. After graduation, he attended the John Jay College of Criminal Justice, from which he received a Master of Public Administration in 1974. He then worked for IBM as a salesman for eight years, receiving the IBM 100% Club Presidency for his high sales achievements. He moved to Florida in 1994 and started the Gibbons Consulting Group, of which he is the President. Gibbons served as a Hallandale Beach City Commissioner from 2003 to 2006, when he was elected to the legislature.

== Florida House of Representatives ==
When incumbent State Representative Kenneth Gottlieb was unable to seek re-election in 2006, Gibbons ran to succeed him in the 105th District, which stretched from Pembroke Pines to Hallandale Beach in southern Broward County. In the Democratic primary, Gibbons narrowly defeated Henry Rose by 331 votes, and was uncontested in the general election. He was re-elected without opposition in 2008 and 2010.

In 2012, following the redistricting process, Gibbons was redrawn into the 100th District, which included his home in Hallandale Beach and stretched from Fort Lauderdale in Broward to Indian Creek. Gibbons was opposed in the Democratic primary by Sheldon Lisbon, a former Surfside Town Commissioner and son of Holocaust survivors. During the course of the campaign, Lisbon sent out a controversial campaign email that said, "[District 100] is primarily a Jewish district that composed of residents like us," which contrasted with the fact that Gibbons is African-American. The Anti-Defamation League blasted Lisbon for the email, which they called "divisive" and "contrary to the ideal of including all Americans in the political process." Gibbons ultimately defeated Lisbon in the primary, winning 55% of the vote to Lisbon's 45%. In the general election, Gibbons was elected to his final term in the House unopposed once again.

== Broward County Commission ==
In 2014, Gibbons was term-limited and was unable to run for re-election in the Florida House of Representatives, so he instead ran for the Broward County Commission in the 6th District, which consists of southeastern Broward County, stretching from Pembroke Pines to Hollywood and Hallandale Beach, as incumbent County Commissioner Sue Gunzburger could not seek re-election. He faced former Hollywood City Commissioner Beam Furr, and during the campaign, came under fire for whether he actively lived in the county or not. In 2009 and 2010, the County Property Appraiser's Office determined that he "falsely claimed his Hallandale Beach condo was his permanent residence," and his wife, Ava Parker, continues to maintain her residence and business in Jacksonville, where they are raising their children, while she spends most of her time in Lakeland as the Chief Operating Officer at Florida Polytechnic University. The Sun-Sentinel, though praising Gibbons as a "strong candidate," ultimately endorsed Furr, praising his "demonstrated courage in looking out for taxpayers." Ultimately, Furr comfortably defeated Gibbons, receiving 57% of the vote to Gibbons's 43%.
