= Debby Sanderson =

American politician

Debby P. Sanderson
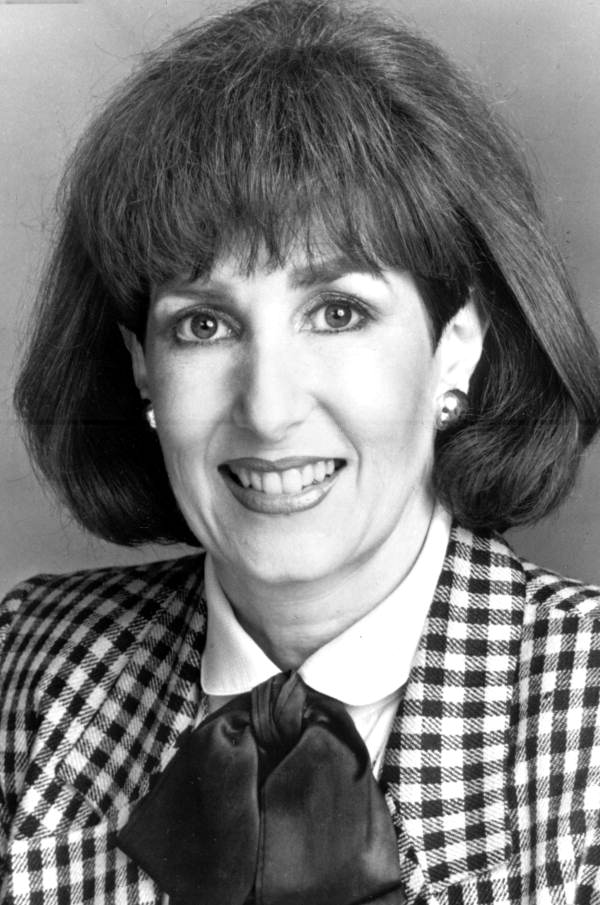

Member of the Florida Senate from the 31st district
- In office 2000–2002
- Preceded by: James A. Scott
- Succeeded by: Steven Geller

Member of the Florida House of Representatives from the 91st district
- In office 1992–2000
- Preceded by: Bill Clark
- Succeeded by: Connie Mack IV

Member of the Florida House of Representatives from the 93rd district
- In office 1982–1992
- Preceded by: Harold J. Dyer
- Succeeded by: M. Mandy Dawson

Personal details
- Born: September 28, 1941 (age 85) Stratford, Connecticut, U.S.
- Spouse: Pete Sanderson
- Education: Broward Community College; Florida Atlantic University

Debby P. Sanderson (born September 28, 1941) is a former Republican member of the Florida House of Representatives and the Florida Senate. She was the first Republican woman elected to the House of Representatives from Broward County. She retired from the State Senate in 2002 after redistricting.

Florida House of Representatives
Preceded by Harold J. Dyer	Member of the Florida House of Representatives from the 93rd district 1982–1992	Succeeded by M. Mandy Dawson
Preceded by Bill Clark	Member of the Florida House of Representatives from the 91st district 1992–2000	Succeeded by Connie Mack IV
Florida Senate
Preceded by James A. Scott	Member of the Florida Senate from the 31st district 2000–2002	Succeeded by Steven Geller
