= Josephus Eggelletion =

American politician (1949–2018)

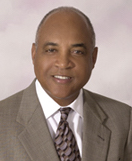

Member of the Broward County Commission from the 9th district
- In office November 21, 2000 – December 10, 2009 (Note: Eggelletion was suspended from office from September 24 to December 10, 2009, when he resigned. On November 23, 2009, Governor Charlie Crist appointed Al Jones to serve during Eggelletion's suspension; he also succeeded him upon his resignation.)
- Preceded by: District created
- Succeeded by: Al Jones

Member of the Florida House of Representatives from the 94th district
- In office November 3, 1992 – November 7, 2000
- Preceded by: Bill Clark (redistricting)
- Succeeded by: Matthew Meadows

Personal details
- Born: April 23, 1949 Miami, Florida
- Died: November 21, 2018 (aged 69) Lauderdale Lakes, Florida
- Party: Democratic
- Children: 2
- Education: Florida A&M University (B.S.)
- Occupation: Teacher

Josephus Eggelletion (April 23, 1949 – November 21, 2018) was a Democratic politician from Florida who served as a member of the Florida House of Representatives from the 94th district from 1992 to 2000 and as a member of the Broward County Commission from 2000 to 2009.

== Early life ==
Eggelletion was born in Miami, in 1949, and moved to Broward County in 1955, where he grew up. He graduated from Dillard High School in 1967, and later attended Florida A&M University, where he received his bachelor's degree in political science in 1971. Eggelletion worked for the Eckerd Drug Corporation as a manager from 1971 to 1974, and then taught at Cooper City High School from 1974 to 1979, and at Dillard High School starting in 1979.

In 1990, Eggelletion was appointed to fill a vacancy on the Lauderdale Lakes City Council. He was elected later that year to a full term and re-elected in 1992.

== Florida House of Representatives ==
Following redistricting in 1992, State Representative Bill Clark declined to seek another term, and Eggelletion ran to succeed him in the renumbered 94th district. No one filed to run against him, and he was elected to the House unopposed.

He was re-elected unopposed in 1994, 1996, and 1998. Eggelletion was prohibited from seeking a fifth consecutive term in 2000 because of term limits.

== Broward County Commission ==
In 2000, the Broward County Commission expanded itself from seven to nine members, and drew a Black-majority 9th district in the central part of the county. Eggelletion ran for the seat, and faced Pompano Beach City Commissioner Pat Larkins and Fort Lauderdale City Commissioner Carlton Moore in the Democratic primary. Eggelletion placed first in the primary, winning 40 percent of the vote, and proceeded to a runoff with Moore, who placed second with 35 percent. Eggelletion defeated Moore in the runoff with 55 percent of the vote, and was sworn in on November 21, 2000, as the commission's second-ever Black member.

Eggelletion ran for re-election in 2004, and was challenged in the Democratic primary by Allen Jackson, a Pompano Beach Police Department community involvement specialist. Jackson waged an active campaign against Eggelletion, and lost by less than expected, receiving 38 percent of the vote to Eggelletion's 62 percent. Eggelletion faced no opponent in the general election and was elected unopposed.

In 2008, Eggelletion ran for a third term. He was challenged by three opponents: Jackson, in a rematch of their 2004 election, Lauderdale Lakes City Commissioner John Billingsley Jr., and Lauderhill City Commissioner Dale Holness. Eggelletion won the primary by a wide margin, but with only a bare majority, receiving 52 percent of the vote to Jackson's 18 percent, Holness's 17 percent, and Billingsley's 12 percent.

== Legal troubles ==
Eggelletion was arrested on September 23, 2009, following Operation Flat Screen, a four-year investigation by the Federal Bureau of Investigation in which he and several other officials in the county were paid bribes. He was charged with fraud and money laundering, and was immediately suspended from office by Governor Charlie Crist. On November 23, 2009, Crist appointed Al Jones, a former Dania Beach City Commissioner, to serve during Eggelletion's suspension.

While Eggelletion originally pleaded not guilty and maintained his innocence, on December 10, 2009, he pleaded guilty and resigned from office as part of a plea deal. He was later sentenced to 30 months in prison. He later pleaded guilty to a state-level bribery charges, and received an identical sentence to be served simultaneously. Eggelletion was imprisoned at FCI Jesup in Jesup, Georgia, and was released on July 18, 2012, after receiving good behavior credits.

== Death ==
Eggelletion died on November 21, 2018.
