= Spud Clements =

American politician (1928–1992)

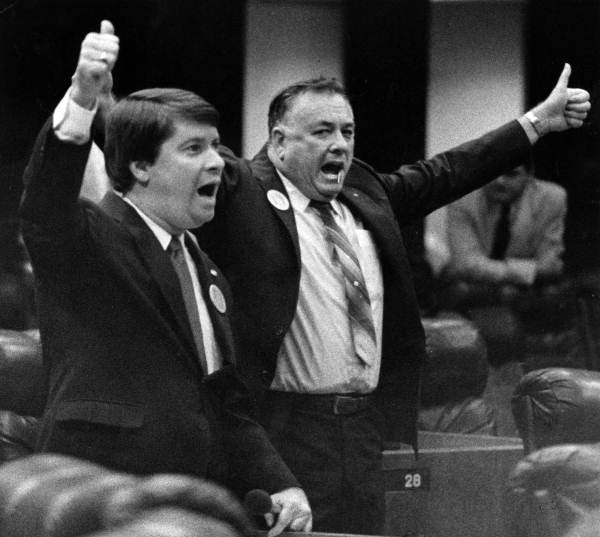
- Clements (right) votes yes in the House, 1987

Member of the Florida House of Representatives for the 62nd district
- In office 1980–1990

Personal details
- Born: Spurgeon Legreer Clements Jr. September 4, 1928 Tampa, Florida, U.S.
- Died: July 1, 1992 (aged 63) Tampa, Florida, U.S.
- Party: Democratic
- Occupation: police officer

Spurgeon Legreer "Spud" Clements Jr. (September 4, 1928 – July 1, 1992) was an American politician in the state of Florida.

Clements was born in Tampa. He attended the University of Tampa, University of Louisville, FBI National Academy, University of Virginia and Hillsborough Community College. He worked in law enforcement, and was a Florida Highway Patrol officer. He served in the Florida House of Representatives from 1980 to 1990 for district 62 as a member of the Democratic Party. He died in 1992 of complications from surgery.
