= Florida's 99th House of Representatives district =

Florida district

Florida's 99th State House of Representatives district
Representative
Daryl Campbell; D–Fort Lauderdale

Florida's 99th House of Representatives district elects one member of the Florida House of Representatives. It contains parts of Broward County.

== Members ==
- Daryl Campbell (since 2022)
