= Tom McPherson =

American politician (1935–2020)

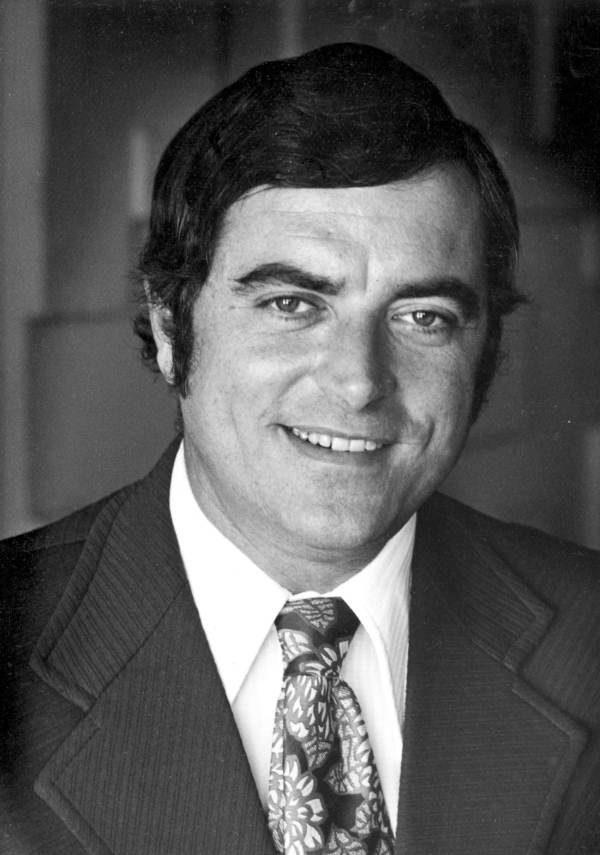
Tom McPherson

Thomas Allen McPherson (March 26, 1935 – December 15, 2020) was an American politician from Florida, serving both as a mayor and in both state government houses.

== Biography ==
McPherson was the first elected mayor of Cooper City, Florida, with prior mayors being appointed by property developers. He was born in Decatur, Illinois. He later served in both houses of government in Florida for over 16 years.

During his time in the legislature, McPherson championed environmental issues, including raising over $100 million via bonds to protect environmentally sensitive areas. He also served as the House Community Affairs Committee chairman.

McPherson lost his state Senate seat in 1990 after losing in the primary to Ken Jenne. McPherson lost the seat a year after admitting his drinking problem on the floor of the state Senate.

McPherson died in Tallahassee, Florida on December 15, 2020, at the age of 85.

He is portrayed by Michael Chernus in the 2026 Tom McCarthy film A Statement.
