= Andrew Hargrett =

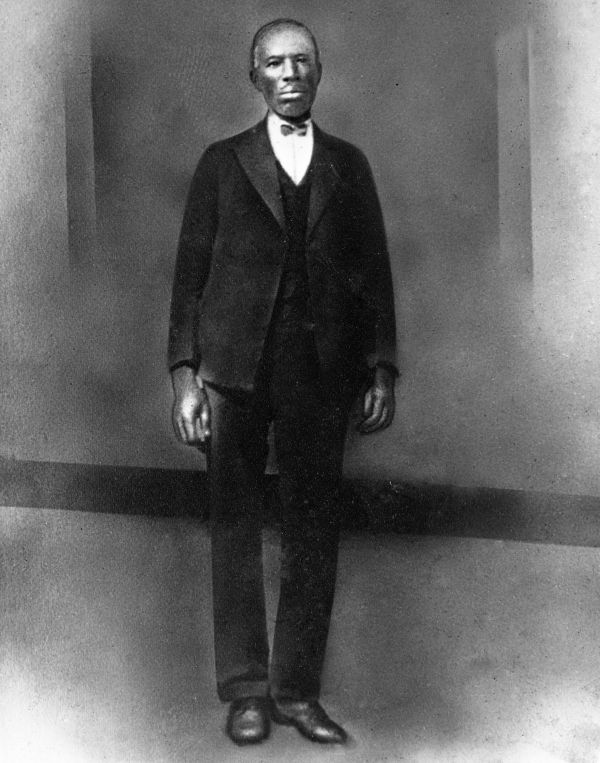

Andrew Joshua Hargrett, Sr. (1879–1932) was a pioneering African-American educator who organized Shadeville Elementary School in 1909, the first school for black people in Wakulla County, Florida. In the late 1920s, he also led the crusade to establish Shadeville High School, the county's first high school for black students. His oldest son, Andrew Hargrett II, was in the first graduating class in 1930.

For 37 years, Shadeville High School continued to educate students in the area. The school was closed in 1967 after desegregation. On August 21, 1989, the Wakulla County, Florida Commission renamed the road that runs past the site of the former Shadeville High School, in honor of Andrew J. Hargrett, Sr., for his early contributions to education. The Old Shadeville High School Marker can be found at 87 Andrew J. Hargrett, Sr. Road (off County Road 61, east of Crawfordville Highway). The monument was established by the Shadeville High School Alumni Association in 1992.

In addition to organizing the first elementary school and high school for black students in Wakulla County, Florida, Andrew J. Hargrett, Sr. also trained adults to serve as teachers in the schools. Because the state of Florida required teachers to be certified to teach, he provided tutoring for black people, as well as white people, to prepare for the examination. His efforts helped to ensure that Wakulla County retained qualified teachers at all levels. He also traveled throughout the county speaking about the importance of education and encouraging parents to send their children to school.

== Personal life ==
Andrew J. Hargrett, Sr. attended Florida Normal and Industrial College (now Florida A & M University), which at the time offered two years of college education. He completed a program of study in carpentry, mathematics, and history. After completing his studies, he successfully passed the Florida teacher's examination to become certified to teach.

In 1906, he married Cora Horton, who died on July 8, 1909, five months after the birth of their son, Ovid Vance Hargrett. In 1913, he married Delia Green, a teacher. They settled in the Hyde Park Community of Wakulla County, Florida, and together, they had nine children: Garrett, Andrew II, Quinton, Eddie, Ethel, Fred, Mary De, Doris (Doris Hargrett Clack), and Edith.

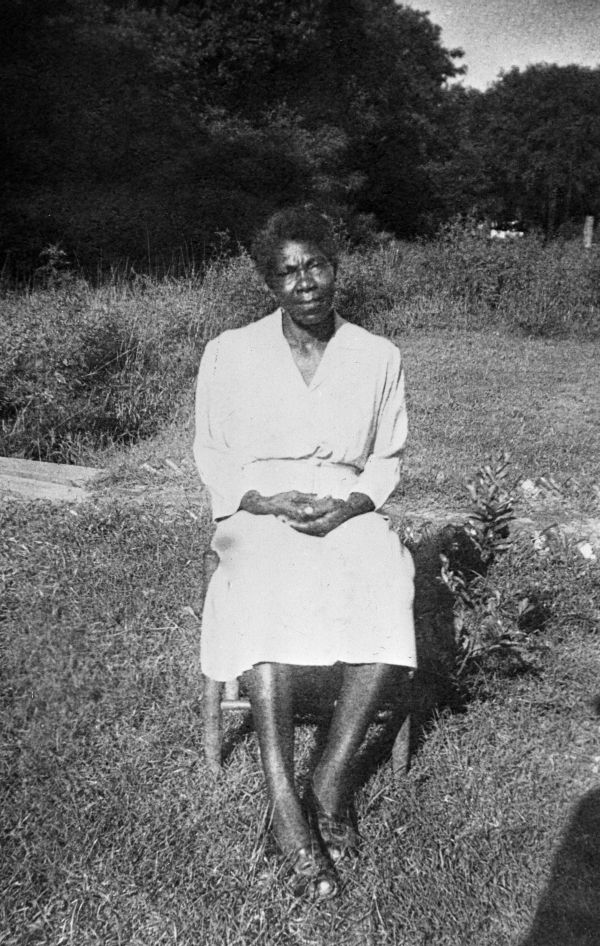
Delia Leana Green

They instilled the importance of education in their children, all of whom graduated from high school and attended college, with the exception of Quinton, who died as an infant.

On March 9, 1932, Andrew J. Hargrett Sr. died, following a serious illness that was determined to be stomach cancer. His wife, Delia, continued to champion the cause of education among her family until her death on August 15, 1964.

== See also ==
- James Hargrett
- Amos Hargrett
