= Kenneth Gottlieb =

American politician and judge (born 1963)

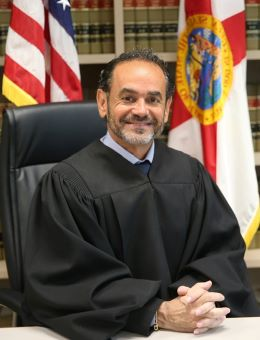

Judge of the Broward County Court, Group 20
- Incumbent
- Assumed office January 4, 2011
- Preceded by: Kathleen Ireland

Member of the Florida House of Representatives
- In office March 17, 1998 – November 7, 2006
- Preceded by: Steven Geller
- Succeeded by: Joseph Gibbons
- Constituency: 101st district (1998–2002); 105th district (2002–2006)

Personal details
- Born: May 26, 1963 (age 63) Hollywood, Florida
- Spouse: Jennifer Gottlieb (divorced)
- Children: 2
- Education: University of Florida (B.A.); University of Miami School of Law (J.D.)

Kenneth Alan Gottlieb (born May 26, 1963) is an American politician and judge from Florida who has served as a judge on the Broward County Court since 2011. Prior to his election to the bench in 2010, he served as a member of the Florida House of Representatives from 1998 to 2006 and on the Hollywood City Commission.
