= 2020 Florida House of Representatives election =

- November 3, 2020

All 120 seats in the Florida House of Representatives 61 seats needed for a majority
- Turnout: 63.34% ▲17.95 pp
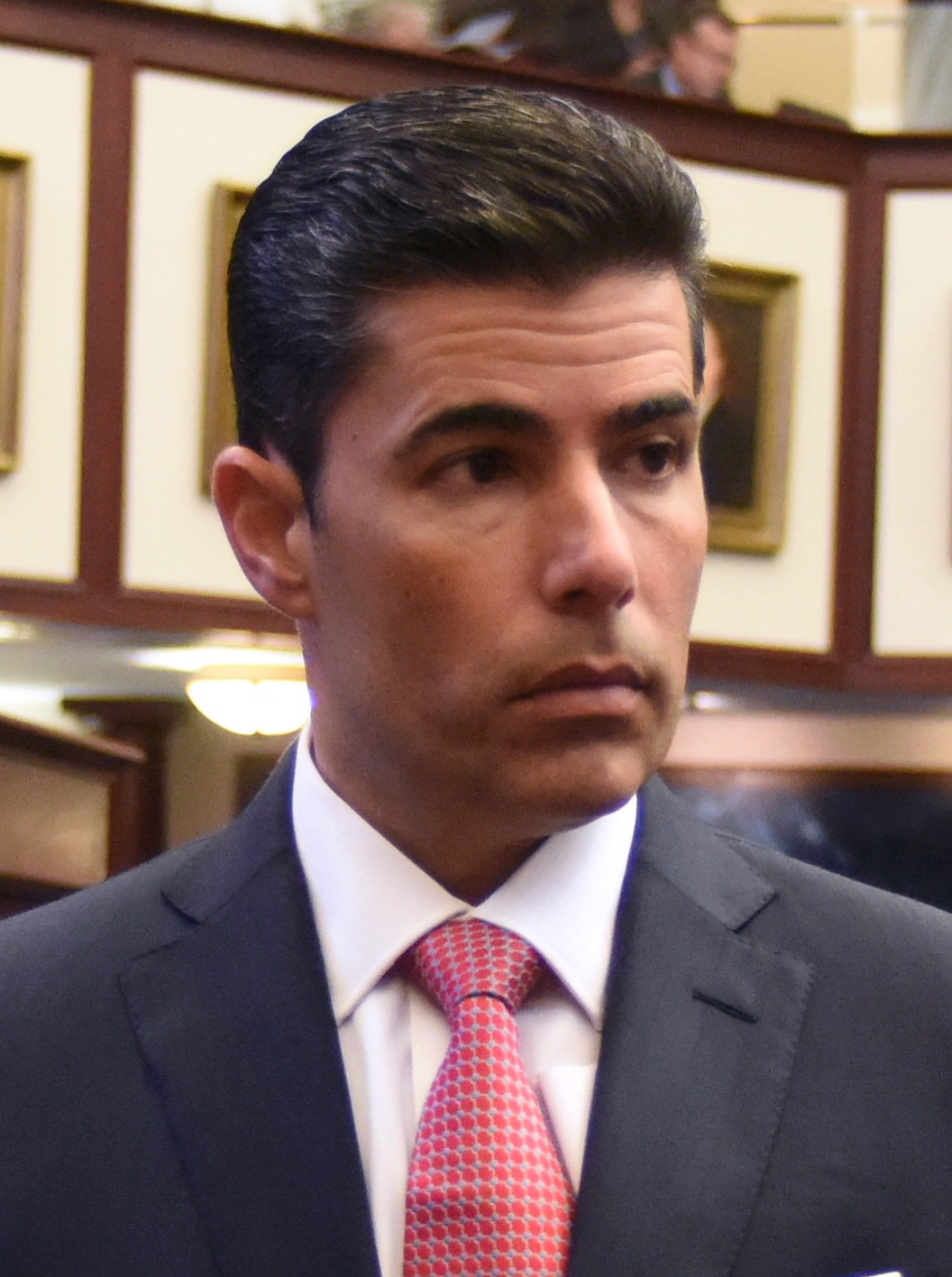

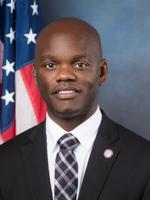
	Majority party	Minority party
Leader	José Oliva (term-limited)	Kionne McGhee (term-limited)
Party	Republican	Democratic
Leader since	November 20, 2018	November 19, 2018
Leader's seat	110th-Miami Lakes	117th-Miami
Last election	73 seats, 56.21%	47 seats, 42.24%
Seats won	78	42
Seat change	▲5	▼5
Popular vote	5,075,575	3,796,251
Percentage	56.97%	42.61%
Swing	▲0.76%	▲0.37%
- Results: Republican gain Republican hold Democratic hold
Speaker before election
José Oliva
Republican
Elected Speaker
Chris Sprowls
Republican

The 2020 elections for the Florida House of Representatives took place on Tuesday, November 3, 2020, to elect representatives from all 120 districts. The Republican Party had held a House majority since 1997.

The elections for U.S. president, U.S. House of Representatives, and the state Florida senate were also held on this date.

The Republicans gained seven seats, while the Democrats lost four in the state house.

== Overview ==
Party	Votes		Seats		
Party	No.	%	No.	+/−	%
Republican Party of Florida	5,075,575	56.97	78	+5	65.00
Florida Democratic Party	3,796,251	42.61	42	-5	35.00
Independent	32,224	0.36	0	0	0.00
Libertarian Party of Florida	5,506	0.06	0	0	0.00
Write-in	38	0.00	0	0	0.00
Total	8,909,594	100.00	120	±0	100.00
Registered voters / turnout (as of August 2020)	14,065,627	63.34			
Source: Florida Division of Elections

Popular vote
Republican	56.97%
Democratic	42.61%
Other	0.42%

House seats
Republican	65%
Democratic	35%

=== Closest races ===
Seats where the margin of victory was under 10%:

1. District 42, 1.1%
2. District 59, 1.4%
3. District 21, 2.2%
4. District 29, 3.9%
5. District 44, 4.8%
6. District 69, 5% gain
7. District 30, 6%
8. District 84, 6% gain
9. District 112, 6%
10. District 28, 6.1%
11. District 26, 6.2%
12. District 41, 6.6%
13. District 105, 7.4%
14. District 15, 7.6%
15. District 68, 7.6%
16. District 64, 8.2%
17. District 60, 8.6%
18. District 103, 8.4% gain
19. District 114, 8.8%
20. District 57, 9%
21. District 72, 9.2%

== Predictions ==
Source	Ranking	As of
The Cook Political Report	Likely R	October 21, 2020

== Primary election polling ==
District 4 - Republican

Poll source	Date(s) administered	Sample size (Note: Key: A – all adults RV – registered voters LV – likely voters V – unclear)	Margin of error	Sandra Atkinson	Jeff Hinkle	Patt Maney	Jonathan Tallman	Undecided
St. Pete Polls/Florida Politics	August 13, 2020	468 (LV)	± 4.5%	10%	25%	35%	12%	19%

District 27 - Republican

Poll source	Date(s) administered	Sample size	Margin of error	Webster Barnaby	Erika Benfield	Zenaida Denizac	Undecided
St. Pete Polls/Florida Politics	August 4, 2020	302 (LV)	± 5.6%	36%	16%	9%	39%

District 53 - Republican

Poll source	Date(s) administered	Sample size	Margin of error	Randy Fine	Marcie Adkins	Undecided
St. Pete Polls/Florida Politics	Released August 16, 2020	– (LV) (Note: Not yet released)	–	59%	22%	20%

District 55 - Republican

Poll source	Date(s) administered	Sample size	Margin of error	Ned Hancock	Kaylee Tuck	Undecided
St. Pete Polls/Florida Politics	July 24, 2020	422 (LV)	± 4.8%	35%	37%	28%

District 76 - Republican

Poll source	Date(s) administered	Sample size	Margin of error	Adam Botana	Jason Maughan	Undecided
St. Pete Polls/Florida Politics	Released August 7, 2020	– (LV)	± 5.6%	35%	19%	46%

District 78 - Republican

Poll source	Date(s) administered	Sample size	Margin of error	Roger Lolly	Charles Lynch	Jenna Persons	Undecided
St. Pete Polls/Florida Politics	August 1–2, 2020	232 (LV)	± 6.4%	21%	10%	40%	29%

== Retiring incumbents ==
=== Democrats ===
- Loranne Ausley, District 9 (term-limited, running for SD-3)
- Clovis Watson, District 20 (term-limited, running for Alachua Co. sheriff)
- John Cortes, District 43 (retiring, running for Osceola Co. Clerk of Courts)
- Bruce Antone, District 46 (term-limited, running for Orange Co. School Board District 5)
- Amy Mercado, District 48 (retiring, running for Orange Co. Property Appraiser)
- Adam Hattersley, District 59 (retiring, running for CD-15)
- Wengay Newton, District 70 (retiring, running for Pinellas Co. Commission District 7)
- Margaret Good, District 72 (retiring, running for CD-16)
- Tina Polsky, District 81 (retiring, running for SD-29)
- Shevrin Jones, District 101 (term-limited, running for SD-35)
- Sharon Pritchett, District 102 (term-limited, running for Miami Gardens mayor)
- Richard Stark, District 104 (term-limited, running for Weston mayor)
- Barbara Watson, District 107 (term-limited running for SD-35)
- Javier Fernandez, District 114 (retiring, running for SD-39)
- Kionne McGhee, District 117 (term-limited, running for Miami-Dade Co. Commission District 9)

=== Republicans ===
- Mel Ponder, District 4 (retiring, running for Okaloosa County Commission district 5)
- Travis Cummings, District 18 (term-limited)
- Charlie Stone, District 22 (term-limited)
- David Santiago, District 27 (term-limited)
- Jennifer Sullivan, District 31 (term-limited)
- Mike La Rosa, District 42 (term-limited)
- Cary Pigman, District 55 (term-limited)
- Ray Rodrigues, District 76 (term-limited, running for SD-27)
- Dane Eagle, District 77 (term-limited, running for CD-19)
- Heather Fitzenhagen, District 78 (term-limited, running for SD-27)
- Byron Donalds, District 80 (term-limited, running for CD-19)
- MaryLynn Magar, District 82 (term-limited)
- Ana Maria Rodriguez, District 105 (retiring, running for SD-39)
- José R. Oliva, District 110 (term-limited)
- Holly Merrill Raschein, District 120 (term-limited)

== Incumbents defeated ==
=== Republicans ===
- Mike Hill, District 1 (defeated in primary by Michelle Salzman)

=== Democrats ===
- Kimberly Daniels, District 14 (defeated in primary by Angie Nixon)
- Al Jacquet, District 88 (defeated in primary by Omari Hardy)

== General election polling ==
=== District 15 ===
Poll source	Date(s) administered	Sample size	Margin of error	Wyman Duggan (R)	Tammyette Thomas (D)	Undecided
St. Pete Polls/Florida Politics	October 31 – November 1, 2020	310 (LV)	± 5.6%	50%	41%	9%

=== District 21 ===
Poll source	Date(s) administered	Sample size	Margin of error	Chuck Clemons (R)	Kayser Enneking (D)	Undecided
St. Pete Polls	October 31 – November 1, 2020	419 (LV)	± 4.8%	45%	46%	9%

=== District 26 ===
Poll source	Date(s) administered	Sample size	Margin of error	Elizabeth Fetterhoff (R)	Patrick Henry (D)	Other	Undecided
St. Pete Polls/Florida Politics	October 5, 2020	422 (LV)	± 4.8%	46%	48%	2% (Note: "Third party" with 2%)	2%

=== District 36 ===
Poll source	Date(s) administered	Sample size	Margin of error	Amber Mariano (R)	Daniel Endonino (D)	Undecided
St. Pete Polls/Florida Politics	October 13, 2020	427 (LV)	± 4.9%	54%	39%	7%

Note: Anthony Arestia was the democratic candidate for District 36 but was forced to withdraw for personal reasons.

=== District 55 ===
Poll source	Date(s) administered	Sample size	Margin of error	Kaylee Tuck (R)	Linda Tripp (D)	Undecided
St. Pete Polls/Florida Politics	October 23, 2020	492 (LV)	± 4.4%	63%	30%	7%

=== District 59 ===
Poll source	Date(s) administered	Sample size	Margin of error	Andrew Learned (D)	Michael Owen (R)	Undecided
St. Pete Polls/Florida Politics	October 24–25, 2020	320 (LV)	± 5.5%	44%	42%	14%

=== District 60 ===
Poll source	Date(s) administered	Sample size	Margin of error	Jackie Toledo (R)	Julie Jenkins (D)	Undecided
St. Pete Polls/Florida Politics	October 17–18, 2020	405 (LV)	± 4.9%	41%	50%	9%
Democratic Party/Julie Jenkins (Note: The Democratic Party nominated Jenkins prior to this poll's release.)	Released September 19, 2020	– (V)	> ± 4%	42%	36%	–
St. Pete Polls/Florida Politics	September 14, 2020	466 (LV)	± 4.5%	42%	48%	10%

=== District 64 ===
Poll source	Date(s) administered	Sample size	Margin of error	Traci Koster (R)	Jessica Harrington (D)	Undecided
St. Pete Polls/Florida Politics	October 24–25, 2020	443 (LV)	± 4.7%	48%	43%	9%
St. Pete Polls/Florida Politics	September 28, 2020	579 (LV)	± 4.1%	48%	43%	9%

=== District 69 ===
Poll source	Date(s) administered	Sample size	Margin of error	Jennifer Webb (D)	Linda Chaney (R)	Undecided
St. Pete Polls/Florida Politics	October 17–18, 2020	567 (LV)	± 4.1%	50%	40%	11%
St. Pete Polls/Florida Politics	September 3, 2020	658 (LV)	± 3.8%	48%	41%	11%

=== District 72 ===
Poll source	Date(s) administered	Sample size	Margin of error	Drake Buckman (D)	Fiona McFarland (R)	Undecided
St. Pete Polls/Florida Politics	October 31 – November 1, 2020	– (LV)	± 4.6%	47%	48%	5%
St. Pete Polls/Florida Politics	October 17–18, 2020	418 (LV)	± 4.8%	48%	44%	7%

=== District 89 ===
Poll source	Date(s) administered	Sample size	Margin of error	Mike Caruso (R)	Jim Bonfiglio (D)	Undecided
St. Pete Polls/Florida Politics	October 24–25, 2020	332 (LV)	± 5.4%	44%	45%	10%
St. Pete Polls/Florida Politics	October 6, 2020	409 (LV)	± 4.8%	45%	47%	9%
Florida Watch/Progress Florida (Note: Progress Florida primarily supports Democratic candidates.)	Released September 20, 2020	– (V)	± 4.9%	45%	42%	–

Hypothetical polling in district 89

Poll source	Date(s) administered	Sample size	Margin of error	Generic Republican	Generic Democrat
Florida Watch/Progress Florida	Released September 20, 2020	– (V)	± 4.9%	44%	45%

=== District 93 ===
Poll source	Date(s) administered	Sample size	Margin of error	Chip LaMarca (R)	Linda Thompson Gonzalez (D)	Undecided
St. Pete Polls/Florida Politics	October 17–18, 2020	309 (LV)	± 5.6%	46%	45%	9%

== Results ==
State house districts that cover more than one county will have a "Results by county" subsection.

=== District 1 ===
Florida House of Representatives election
Party	Candidate	Votes	%
Republican	Michelle Salzman	57,363	65.3%
Democratic	Franscine C. Mathis	30,485	34.7%
Total votes		87,848	100%
Republican hold			

=== District 2 ===
Florida House of Representatives election
Party	Candidate	Votes	%
Republican	Alex Andrade (incumbent)	49,953	55.8%
Democratic	Dianne Krumel	39,507	44.2%
Total votes		89,460	100%
Republican hold			

==== Results by county ====
County	Alex Andrade Republican	Dianne Krumel Democratic	Totals
County	#	#	#
Escambia	42,742	36,336	79,078
Santa Rosa	7,211	3,171	10,382
Total	49,953	39,507	89,460

=== District 3 ===
Florida House of Representatives election
Party	Candidate	Votes	%
Republican	Jayer Williamson (incumbent)	82,702	76.1%
Democratic	Angela L. Hoover	25,929	23.9%
Total votes		108,631	100$
Republican hold			

=== District 4 ===
Florida House of Representatives election
Party	Candidate	Votes	%
Republican	Patt Maney	70,208	72.2%
Democratic	John Plante	27,083	27.8%
Independent	Lance Lawrence	11	0.0%
Total votes		97,302	100%
Republican hold			

=== District 5 ===
Incumbent Brad Drake ran unopposed in the general election, and the election was canceled. He was re-elected.

=== District 6 ===
Florida House of Representatives election
Party	Candidate	Votes	%
Republican	Jay Trumbull (incumbent)	61,456	72.0%
Democratic	Alicia Bays	23,848	28.0%
Total votes		85,304	100%
Republican hold			

=== District 7 ===
Florida House of Representatives election
Party	Candidate	Votes	%
Republican	Jason Shoaf	55,841	73.0%
Democratic	Taymour Khan	20,696	27.0%
Total votes		76,537	100%
Republican hold			

=== District 8 ===
Incumbent Ramon Alexander ran unopposed in the general election, and the election was canceled. He was re-elected.

=== District 9 ===
Florida House of Representatives election
Party	Candidate	Votes	%
Democratic	Allison Tant	58,868	57.8%
Republican	Jim Kallinger	42,901	42.2%
Total votes		101,769	100%
Democratic hold			

=== District 10 ===
Florida House of Representatives election
Party	Candidate	Votes	%
Republican	Chuck Brannan (incumbent)	58,872	78.2%
Democratic	Rock Aboujaoude	16,456	21.8%
Total votes		75,328	100%
Republican hold			

==== Results by county ====
County	Chuck Brannan Republican	Rock Aboujaoude Democratic	Totals
County	#	#	#
Alachua	2,367	1,284	3,651
Baker	12,001	1,830	13,831
Columbia	24,236	7,683	31,919
Hamilton	3,842	1,772	5,614
Suwannee	16,426	3,887	20,313
Totals	58,872	16,456	75,328

=== District 11 ===
Florida House of Representatives election
Party	Candidate	Votes	%
Republican	Cord Byrd (incumbent)	76,422	68.2%
Democratic	Joshua Hicks	35,686	31.8%
Total votes		112,108	100%
Republican hold			

==== Results by county ====
County	Cord Byrd Republican	Joshua Hicks Democratic	Totals
County	#	#	#
Duval	34,195	20,579	54,774
Nassau	42,227	15,107	57,334
Totals	76,422	35,686	112,108

=== District 12 ===
Florida House of Representatives election
Party	Candidate	Votes	%
Republican	Clay Yarborough (incumbent)	51,715	60.1%
Democratic	Emmanuel Blimie	34,391	39.9%
Total votes		86,106	100%
Republican hold			

=== District 13 ===
Incumbent Tracie Davis ran unopposed in the general election, and the election was canceled. She was re-elected.

=== District 14 ===
Angie Nixon defeated incumbent Kimberly Daniels in the primary. She ran unopposed in the general election, and the election was canceled. She was elected.

=== District 15 ===
Florida House of Representatives election
Party	Candidate	Votes	%
Republican	Wyman Duggan (incumbent)	45,360	53.8%
Democratic	Tammyette Thomas	39,000	46.2%
Total votes		84,360	100%
Republican hold			

=== District 16 ===
Florida House of Representatives election
Party	Candidate	Votes	%
Republican	Jason Fischer (incumbent)	59,549	57.6%
Democratic	Ben Marcus	43,901	42.4%
Total votes		103,450	100%
Republican hold			

=== District 17 ===
Florida House of Representatives election
Party	Candidate	Votes	%
Republican	Cyndi Stevenson (incumbent)	97,932	67.7%
Democratic	Dave Rogers	46,685	32.3%
Total votes		144,617	100%
Republican hold			

=== District 18 ===
Florida House of Representatives election
Party	Candidate	Votes	%
Republican	Sam Garrison	64,759	67.2%
Democratic	Leroy Anthony Edwards	28,457	29.5%
Libertarian	Ken Willey	3,099	3.2%
Total votes		96,315	100%
Republican hold			

=== District 19 ===
Florida House of Representatives election
Party	Candidate	Votes	%
Republican	Bobby Payne (incumbent)	58,184	73.2%
Democratic	Kimberly Dugger	21,259	26.8%
Total votes		79,443	100%
Republican hold			

=== District 20 ===
Yvonne Hayes Hinson ran unopposed in the general election, and the election was canceled. She was elected.

=== District 21 ===
Florida House of Representatives election
Party	Candidate	Votes	%
Republican	Chuck Clemons (incumbent)	48,883	51.1%
Democratic	Kayser Enneking	46,817	48.9%
Total votes		95,700	100%
Republican hold			

==== Results by county ====
County	Chuck Clemons Republican	Kaser Enneking Democratic	Totals
County	#	#	#
Alachua	34,151	44,114	78,265
Dixie	6,731	1,165	7,896
Gilchrist	8,001	1,538	9,539
Totals	48,883	46,817	95,700

=== District 22 ===
Florida House of Representatives election
Party	Candidate	Votes	%
Republican	Joe Harding	63,520	64.5%
Democratic	Barbara Byram	35,011	35.5%
Total votes		98,531	100%
Republican hold			

=== District 23 ===
Florida House of Representatives election
Party	Candidate	Votes	%
Republican	Stan McClain (incumbent)	58,787	67.1%
Democratic	Cynthia Dela Rosa	28,882	32.9%
Total votes		87,669	100%
Republican hold			

=== District 24 ===
Florida House of Representatives election
Party	Candidate	Votes	%
Republican	Paul Renner (incumbent)	70,884	63.0%
Democratic	Adam Morley	41,553	37.0%
Total votes		112,437	100%
Republican hold			

==== Results by county ====
County	Paul Renner Republican	Adam Morley Democratic	Totals
County	#	#	#
Flagler	42,186	26,345	68,531
St. Johns	16,290	9,074	25,364
Volusia	12,408	6,134	18,542
Totals	70,884	41,553	112,437

=== District 25 ===
Florida House of Representatives election
Party	Candidate	Votes	%
Republican	Tom Leek (incumbent)	65,675	62.7%
Democratic	Sarah Zutter	36,696	35.0%
Libertarian	Joseph "Joe" Hannoush	2,407	2.3%
Total votes		104,778	100%
Republican hold			

=== District 26 ===
Florida House of Representatives election
Party	Candidate	Votes	%
Republican	Elizabeth Fetterhoff (incumbent)	44,278	53.1%
Democratic	Patrick Henry	39,164	46.9%
Total votes		83,442	100%
Republican hold			

=== District 27 ===
2020 Florida's 27th State House district debate
No.	Date	Host	Moderator	Link	Republican	Democratic
Key: P Participant A Absent N Not invited I Invited W Withdrawn						
Key: P Participant A Absent N Not invited I Invited W Withdrawn					Webster Barnaby	Dolores Guzman
1	Oct. 8, 2020	WESH	Greg Fox	YouTube	P	P

Florida House of Representatives election
Party	Candidate	Votes	%
Republican	Webster Barnaby	49,486	56.2%
Democratic	Dolores Guzman	38,583	43.8%
Total votes		88,069	100%
Republican hold			

=== District 28 ===
2020 Florida's 28th State House district debate
No.	Date	Host	Moderator	Link	Republican	Democratic	Independent
Key: P Participant A Absent N Not invited I Invited W Withdrawn							
Key: P Participant A Absent N Not invited I Invited W Withdrawn					David Smith	Pasha Baker	Michael Riccio
1	Oct. 1, 2020	WESH	Greg Fox	YouTube	P	P	P

Florida House of Representatives election
Party	Candidate	Votes	%
Republican	David Smith (incumbent)	51,350	52.0%
Democratic	Pasha Baker	45,288	45.9%
Independent	Michael A. Riccio	2,049	2.1%
Total votes		98,687	100%
Republican hold			

=== District 29 ===
2020 Florida's 29th State House district debate
No.	Date	Host	Moderator	Link	Republican	Democratic	Independent
Key: P Participant A Absent N Not invited I Invited W Withdrawn							
Key: P Participant A Absent N Not invited I Invited W Withdrawn					Scott Plakon	Tracey Kagan	Juan Rodriguez
1	Oct. 8, 2020	WESH	Greg Fox	YouTube	P	P	P

Florida House of Representatives election
Party	Candidate	Votes	%
Republican	Scott Plakon (incumbent)	48,411	50.5%
Democratic	Tracey Kagan	44,619	46.6%
Independent	Juan Rodriguez	2,760	2.9%
Total votes		95,790	100%
Republican hold			

=== District 30 ===
2020 Florida's 30th State House district debate
No.	Date	Host	Moderator	Link	Democratic	Republican
Key: P Participant A Absent N Not invited I Invited W Withdrawn						
Key: P Participant A Absent N Not invited I Invited W Withdrawn					Joy Goff-Marcil	Bob Cortes
1	Oct. 8, 2020	WESH	Greg Fox	YouTube	P	P

Florida House of Representatives election
Party	Candidate	Votes	%
Democratic	Joy Goff-Marcil (incumbent)	46,713	53.0%
Republican	Bob Cortes	41,452	47.0%
Total votes		88,165	100%
Democratic hold			

==== Results by county ====
County	Bob Cortes Republican	Joy Goff-Marcil Democratic	Totals
County	#	#	#
Orange	13,136	16,468	29,604
Seminole	28,316	30,245	58,561
Totals	41,452	46,713	88,165

=== District 31 ===
Florida House of Representatives election
Party	Candidate	Votes	%
Republican	Keith Truenow	58,311	59.7%
Democratic	Crissy Stile	39,403	40.3%
Total votes		97,714	100%
Republican hold			

==== Results by county ====
County	Keith Truenow Republican	Crissy Stile Democrat	Totals
County	#	#	#
Lake	41,223	23,424	64,647
Orange	17,088	15,979	33,067
Totals	58,311	39,403	97,714

=== District 32 ===
Florida House of Representatives election
Party	Candidate	Votes	%
Republican	Anthony Sabatini (incumbent)	63,164	55.7%
Democratic	Stephanie L. Dukes	50,226	44.3%
Total votes		113,390	100%
Republican hold			

=== District 33 ===
Florida House of Representatives election
Party	Candidate	Votes	%
Republican	Brett T. Hage (incumbent)	93,646	69.9%
Democratic	Mamie "Dee" Melvin	40,370	30.1%
Total votes		134,016	100%
Republican hold			

=== District 34 ===
Florida House of Representatives election
Party	Candidate	Votes	%
Republican	Ralph E. Massullo (incumbent)	75,745	75.1%
Democratic	Dushyant Jethagir Gosai	25,069	24.9%
Total votes		100,814	100%
Republican hold			

=== District 35 ===
Florida House of Representatives election
Party	Candidate	Votes	%
Republican	Blaise Ingoglia (incumbent)	60,733	64.3%
Democratic	Keith G. Laufenberg	33,761	35.7%
Total votes		94,494	100%
Republican hold			

=== District 36 ===
Florida House of Representatives election
Party	Candidate	Votes	%
Republican	Amber Mariano	51,432	63.4%
Democratic	Daniel Endonino	29,726	36.6%
Total votes		81,158	100%
Republican hold			

=== District 37 ===
Florida House of Representatives election
Party	Candidate	Votes	%
Republican	Ardian Zika (incumbent)	71,722	62.8%
Democratic	Tammy Garcia	42,436	37.2%
Total votes		114,158	100%
Republican hold			

=== District 38 ===
Florida House of Representatives election
Party	Candidate	Votes	%
Republican	Randy Maggard	57,794	58.7%
Democratic	Brian Staver	40,642	41.3%
Total votes		98,436	100%
Republican hold			

=== District 39 ===
Florida House of Representatives election
Party	Candidate	Votes	%
Republican	Josie Tomkow (incumbent)	57,449	58.8%
Democratic	Chris Cause	40,238	41.2%
Total votes		97,687	100%
Republican hold			

=== District 40 ===
Florida House of Representatives election
Party	Candidate	Votes	%
Republican	Colleen Burton (incumbent)	45,004	56.7%
Democratic	Jan Barrow	31,555	39.8%
Independent	Emily Michie	2,786	3.5%
Total votes		79,345	100%
Republican hold			

=== District 41 ===
Florida House of Representatives election
Party	Candidate	Votes	%
Republican	Sam Killebrew (incumbent)	51,477	53.3%
Democratic	Jared West	45,050	46.7%
Total votes		96,527	100%
Republican hold			

=== District 42 ===
Florida House of Representatives election
Party	Candidate	Votes	%
Republican	Fred Hawkins	46,615	46.8%
Democratic	Barbara Ann Cady	45,455	45.7%
Independent	Leroy Sanchez	7,474	7.5%
Total votes		99,544	100%
Republican hold			

=== District 43 ===
Kristen Arrington ran unopposed. The election was canceled and she got elected.

=== District 44 ===
2020 Florida's 44th State House district debate
No.	Date	Host	Moderator	Link	Democratic	Republican
Key: P Participant A Absent N Not invited I Invited W Withdrawn						
Key: P Participant A Absent N Not invited I Invited W Withdrawn					Geraldine Thompson	Bruno Portigliatti
1	Oct. 8, 2020	WESH	Greg Fox	YouTube	P	P

Florida House of Representatives election
Party	Candidate	Votes	%
Democratic	Geraldine F. Thompson (incumbent)	61,654	52.4%
Republican	Bruno Portigliatti	55,950	47.6%
Total votes		117,604	100%
Democratic hold			

=== District 45 ===
Incumbent Kamia Brown ran unopposed and the election was canceled. She was re-elected.

=== District 46 ===
Travaris McCurdy ran unopposed. The election was canceled and he was elected.

=== District 47 ===
Florida House of Representatives election
Party	Candidate	Votes	%
Democratic	Anna V. Eskamani (incumbent)	59,494	59.0%
Republican	Jeremy Sisson	41,321	41.0%
Total votes		100,815	100%
Democratic hold			

=== District 48 ===
Florida House of Representatives election
Party	Candidate	Votes	%
Democratic	Daisy Morales	47,341	65.3%
Republican	Jesus Martinez	25,197	34.7%
Total votes		72,538	100%
Democratic hold			

=== District 49 ===
Florida House of Representatives election
Party	Candidate	Votes	%
Democratic	Carlos Guillermo Smith (incumbent)	47,759	61.9%
Republican	Robert Prater	29,357	38.1%
Total votes		77,116	100%
Democratic hold			

=== District 50 ===
Florida House of Representatives election
Party	Candidate	Votes	%
Republican	Rene "Coach P" Plasencia (incumbent)	62,790	57.2%
Democratic	Nina Yoakum	47,004	42.8%
Total votes		109,794	100%
Republican hold			

=== District 51 ===
Florida House of Representatives election
Party	Candidate	Votes	%
Republican	Tyler Sirois (incumbent)	59,405	61.8%
Democratic	Joan Marie Majid	36,694	38.2%
Total votes		96,099	100%
Republican hold			

=== District 52 ===
2020 Florida's 52nd State House district debate
No.	Date	Host	Moderator	Link	Republican	Democratic
Key: P Participant A Absent N Not invited I Invited W Withdrawn						
Key: P Participant A Absent N Not invited I Invited W Withdrawn					Thad Altman	Lloyd Dabbs
1	Oct. 1, 2020	WESH	Greg Fox	YouTube	P	P

Florida House of Representatives election
Party	Candidate	Votes	%
Republican	Thad Altman (incumbent)	70,949	62.3%
Democratic	Lloyd Dabbs	42,912	37.7%
Total votes		113,861	100%
Republican hold			

=== District 53 ===
2020 Florida's 30th State House district debate
No.	Date	Host	Moderator	Link	Republican	Democratic
Key: P Participant A Absent N Not invited I Invited W Withdrawn						
Key: P Participant A Absent N Not invited I Invited W Withdrawn					Randy Fine	Phil Moore
1	Oct. 6, 2020	WESH	Greg Fox	YouTube	P	P

Florida House of Representatives election
Party	Candidate	Votes	%
Republican	Randy Fine (incumbent)	55,938	55.5%
Democratic	Phil Moore	44,794	44.5%
Independent	Thomas Patrick Unger (Write in)	13	0.0%
Total votes		100,745	100%
Republican hold			

=== District 54 ===
Florida House of Representatives election
Party	Candidate	Votes	%
Republican	Erin Grall (incumbent)	69,344	65.9%
Democratic	Albert M. Griffiths	35,864	34.1%
Total votes		105,208	100%
Republican hold			

=== District 55 ===
Florida House of Representatives election
Party	Candidate	Votes	%
Republican	Kaylee Tuck	51,946	69.8%
Democratic	Linda Tripp	22,475	30.2%
Democratic	Jacob Hensley (Write in)	3	0.0%
Total votes		74,424	100%
Republican hold			

=== District 56 ===
Florida House of Representatives election
Party	Candidate	Votes	%
Republican	Melony Bell (incumbent)	45,397	67.3%
Democratic	James Davis	22,069	32.7%
Total votes		67,466	100%
Republican hold			

=== District 57 ===
Florida House of Representatives election
Party	Candidate	Votes	%
Republican	Mike Beltran (incumbent)	67,139	54.5%
Democratic	Scott "Mr. H" Hottenstein	56,144	45.5%
Total votes		123,283	100%
Republican hold			

=== District 58 ===
Florida House of Representatives election
Party	Candidate	Votes	%
Republican	Lawrence McClure (incumbent)	40,873	55.8%
Democratic	Cleo L. "CL" Townsend	32,435	44.2%
Total votes		73,308	100%
Republican hold			

=== District 59 ===
Florida House of Representatives election
Party	Candidate	Votes	%
Democratic	Andrew Learned	45,683	50.7%
Republican	Michael Owen	44,413	49.3%
Total votes		90,069	100%
Democratic hold			

=== District 60 ===
Florida House of Representatives election
Party	Candidate	Votes	%
Republican	Jackie Toledo (incumbent)	57,502	54.3%
Democratic	Julie Jenkins	48,352	45.7%
Total votes		105,854	100%
Republican hold			

=== District 61 ===
Incumbent Dianne Hart ran unopposed in the general election. The election was canceled, and she was re-elected.

=== District 62 ===
Florida House of Representatives election
Party	Candidate	Votes	%
Democratic	Susan L. Valdes (incumbent)	38,403	57.6%
Republican	Angel S. Urbina	25,136	37.7%
Independent	Laurie Rodriguez Person	3,183	4.8%
Total votes		66,722	100%
Democratic hold			

=== District 63 ===
Incumbent Fentrice Driskell ran unopposed in the general election. The election was canceled and she was re-elected.

=== District 64 ===
Florida House of Representatives election
Party	Candidate	Votes	%
Republican	Traci Koster	55,874	54.1%
Democratic	Jessica Harrington	47,426	45.9%
Total votes		103,300	100%
Republican hold			

=== District 65 ===
Florida House of Representatives election
Party	Candidate	Votes	%
Republican	Chris Sprowls	63,787	61.1%
Democratic	Kelly Johnson	40,539	38.9%
Total votes		104,326	100%
Republican hold			

=== District 66 ===
Florida House of Representatives election
Party	Candidate	Votes	%
Republican	Nick DiCeglie (incumbent)	56,074	58.7%
Democratic	Patricia M. Platamura	39,522	41.3%
Total votes		95,596	100%
Republican hold			

=== District 67 ===
Florida House of Representatives election
Party	Candidate	Votes	%
Republican	Chris Latvala (incumbent)	47,018	57.0%
Democratic	Dawn Douglas	35,457	43.0%
Total votes		82,475	100%
Republican hold			

=== District 68 ===
Florida House of Representatives election
Party	Candidate	Votes	%
Democratic	Ben Diamond (incumbent)	49,905	53.8%
Republican	Matt Tito	42,785	46.2%
Total votes		92,690	100%
Democratic hold			

=== District 69 ===
Florida House of Representatives election
Party	Candidate	Votes	%
Republican	Linda Chaney	51,400	52.5%
Democratic	Jennifer N. Webb (incumbent)	46,572	47.5%
Total votes		97,972	100%
Republican gain from Democratic			

=== District 70 ===
Michele Rayner ran unopposed in the general election. The election was canceled and she was elected.

=== District 71 ===
Florida House of Representatives election
Party	Candidate	Votes	%
Republican	Will Robinson (incumbent)	51,751	57.8%
Democratic	Andy Mele	37,745	42.2%
Total votes		89,496	100%
Republican hold			

=== District 72 ===
Florida House of Representatives election
Party	Candidate	Votes	%
Republican	Fiona McFarland	54,902	54.6%
Democratic	Drake Buckman	45,617	45.4%
Total votes		100,519	100%
Republican hold			

=== District 73 ===
Florida House of Representatives election
Party	Candidate	Votes	%
Republican	Tommy Gregory (incumbent)	90,503	64.5%
Democratic	David Reeves Fairey	49,822	35.5%
Total votes		140,325	100%
Republican hold			

=== District 74 ===
Florida House of Representatives election
Party	Candidate	Votes	%
Republican	James Buchanan	73,420	62.1%
Democratic	Lisa Stortstorm	44,858	37.9%
Total votes		118,278	100%
Republican hold			

=== District 75 ===
Florida House of Representatives election
Party	Candidate	Votes	%
Republican	Michael Grant (incumbent)	72,913	64.6%
Democratic	David G. Jones	39,972	35.4%
Total votes		112,885	100%
Republican hold			

=== District 76 ===
Florida House of Representatives election
Party	Candidate	Votes	%
Republican	Adam Botana	68,286	65.5%
Democratic	Anselm Weber	35,960	34.5%
Total votes		104,246	100%
Republican hold			

=== District 77 ===
Florida House of Representatives election
Party	Candidate	Votes	%
Republican	Mike Giallombardo	66,165	64.3%
Democratic	Joshua Lopez	36,797	35.7%
Total votes		102,962	100%
Republican hold			

=== District 78 ===
Florida House of Representatives election
Party	Candidate	Votes	%
Republican	Jenna Persons	52,464	57.5%
Democratic	Shawn Michael Williams	38,792	42.5%
Total votes		91,256	100%
Republican hold			

=== District 79 ===
Florida House of Representatives election
Party	Candidate	Votes	%
Republican	Spencer Roach (incumbent)	46,239	60.7%
Democratic	Danika Fornear	29,933	39.3%
Total votes		76,172	100%
Republican hold			

=== District 80 ===
Florida House of Representatives election
Party	Candidate	Votes	%
Republican	Lauren Uhlich Melo	54,859	64.1%
Democratic	Laura Novosasd	30,747	35.9%
Total votes		85,606	100%
Republican hold			

=== District 81 ===
Florida House of Representatives election
Party	Candidate	Votes	%
Democratic	Kelly Skidmore	52,204	59.1%
Republican	Saulis Banionis	36,126	40.9%
Total votes		88,330	100%
Democratic hold			

=== District 82 ===
Florida House of Representatives election
Party	Candidate	Votes	%
Republican	John Snyder	64,879	64.9%
Democratic	Elisa Edwards Ackerly	35,136	35.1%
Total votes		100,015	100%
Republican hold			

=== District 83 ===
Florida House of Representatives election
Party	Candidate	Votes	%
Republican	Toby Overdorf (incumbent)	58,993	56.2%
Democratic	Edgar "EJ" Bernier	46,047	43.8%
Total votes		105,040	100%
Republican hold			

=== District 84 ===
Florida House of Representatives election
Party	Candidate	Votes	%
Republican	Dana Trabulsy	46,373	53.0%
Democratic	Delores Hogan Johnson (incumbent)	41,179	47.0%
Total votes		87,552	100%
Republican gain from Democratic			

=== District 85 ===
Florida House of Representatives election
Party	Candidate	Votes	%
Republican	Rick Roth (incumbent)	61,107	56.5%
Democratic	Jim Carroll	47,008	43.5%
Total votes		108,115	100%
Republican hold			

=== District 86 ===
Florida House of Representatives election
Party	Candidate	Votes	%
Democratic	Matt Willhite	49,820	56.8%
Republican	Susan M. Kufdakis Rivera	37,911	43.2%
Total votes		87,731	100%
Democratic hold			

=== District 87 ===
Florida House of Representatives election
Party	Candidate	Votes	%
Democratic	David Silvers (incumbent)	30,537	62.6%
Republican	Herb Sennett	18,254	37.4%
Total votes		48,791	100%
Democratic hold			

=== District 88 ===
Florida House of Representatives election
Party	Candidate	Votes	%
Democratic	Omari Hardy	53,248	73.8%
Republican	Danielle Madsen	16,396	22.7%
Independent	Rubin Anderson	2,487	3.4%
Total votes		72,131	100%
Democratic hold			

=== District 89 ===
Florida House of Representatives election
Party	Candidate	Votes	%
Republican	Mike Caruso (incumbent)	56,409	55.5%
Democratic	Jim Bonfiglio	45,168	44.5%
Total votes		101,577	100%
Republican hold			

=== District 90 ===
Florida House of Representatives election
Party	Candidate	Votes	%
Democratic	Joseph A. Casello (incumbent)	52,386	59.6%
Republican	Lydia Maldonado	35,537	40.4%
Total votes		87,923	100%
Democratic hold			

=== District 91 ===
Florida House of Representatives election
Party	Candidate	Votes	%
Democratic	Emily Ann Slosberg (incumbent)	68,053	63.7%
Republican	Sayd Hussain	38,763	36.3%
Total votes		106,816	100%
Democratic hold			

=== District 92 ===
Florida House of Representatives election
Party	Candidate	Votes	%
Democratic	Patricia Hawkins-Williams (incumbent)	49,496	81.2%
No party preference	Nancy St. Clair	11,485	18.8%
Total votes		60,981	100%
Democratic hold			

=== District 93 ===
Florida House of Representatives election
Party	Candidate	Votes	%
Republican	Chip LaMarca (incumbent)	54,593	55.2%
Democratic	Linda Thompson Gonzalez	44,239	44.8%
Total votes		98,832	100%
Republican hold			

=== District 94 ===
Incumbent Bobby DuBose ran unopposed and the general election was canceled. He was re-elected.

=== District 95 ===
Incumbent Anika Omphroy ran unopposed and the general election was canceled. She was re-elected.

=== District 96 ===
Christine Hunschofsky ran unopposed and the general election was canceled. She was re-elected.

=== District 97 ===
Incumbent Dan Daley ran unopposed and the general election was canceled. He was re-elected.

=== District 98 ===
Incumbent Michael Gottlieb ran unopposed and the general election was canceled. He was re-elected.

=== District 99 ===
Incumbent Evan Jenne ran unopposed and the general election was canceled. He was re-elected.

=== District 100 ===
Incumbent Joe Geller ran unopposed and the general election was canceled. He was re-elected.

=== District 101 ===
Florida House of Representatives election
Party	Candidate	Votes	%
Democratic	Marie Woodson	51,222	74.1%
Republican	Vincent "Vinny" Parlatore	17,935	25.9%
Total votes		69,157	100%
Democratic hold			

=== District 102 ===
Felicia Robinson ran unopposed and the general election was canceled. She was elected.

=== District 103 ===
Florida House of Representatives election
Party	Candidate	Votes	%
Republican	Tom Fabricio	41,726	54.2%
Democratic	Cindy Polo (incumbent)	35,298	45.8%
Total votes		77,024	100%
Republican gain from Democratic			

=== District 104 ===
Florida House of Representatives election
Party	Candidate	Votes	%
Democratic	Robin Bartleman	50,865	57.9%
Republican	George Navarini	36,921	42.1%
Total votes		87,786	100%
Democratic hold			

=== District 105 ===
Florida House of Representatives election
Party	Candidate	Votes	%
Republican	David Borrero	38,437	53.7%
Democratic	Maureen Porras	33,166	46.3%
Total votes		71,603	100%
Republican hold			

=== District 106 ===
Florida House of Representatives election
Party	Candidate	Votes	%
Republican	Bob Rommel (incumbent)	69,786	65.9%
Democratic	Sara McFadden	36,063	34.1%
Total votes		105,849	100%
Republican hold			

=== District 107 ===
Christopher Benjamin ran unopposed in the general election, and the election was canceled. He was elected.

=== District 108 ===
Incumbent Dotie Joseph ran unopposed in the general election, and the election was canceled. She was re-elected.

=== District 109 ===
Incumbent James Bush ran unopposed in the general election, and the election was canceled. He was elected.

=== District 110 ===
Florida House of Representatives election
Party	Candidate	Votes	%
Republican	Alex Rizo	34,023	59.8%
Democratic	Annette Collazo	22,891	40.2%
Total votes		56,914	100%
Republican hold			

=== District 111 ===
Florida House of Representatives election
Party	Candidate	Votes	%
Republican	Bryan Avila (incumbent)	32,443	64.9%
Democratic	Ross Elde Hancock	17,567	35.1%
Total votes		50,010	100%
Republican hold			

=== District 112 ===
Florida House of Representatives election
Party	Candidate	Votes	%
Democratic	Nicholas Xavier Duran (incumbent)	40,063	53.0%
Republican	Bruno A. Barreiro	35,515	47.0%
Total votes		75,578	100%
Democratic hold			

=== District 113 ===
Incumbent Michael Grieco ran unopposed in the general election, and the election was canceled. He was elected.

=== District 114 ===
Florida House of Representatives election
Party	Candidate	Votes	%
Republican	Demi Busatta Cabrera	43,443	54.4%
Democratic	Jean Pierre Bado	36,434	45.6%
Total votes		79,877	100%
Republican hold			

=== District 115 ===
Florida House of Representatives election
Party	Candidate	Votes	%
Republican	Vance Aloupis (incumbent)	47,544	57.3%
Democratic	Franccesca Cesti-Browne	35,412	42.7%
Total votes		82,956	100%
Republican hold			

=== District 116 ===
Florida House of Representatives election
Party	Candidate	Votes	%
Republican	Daniel A. Perez (incumbent)	48,804	62.8%
Democratic	Bob Lynch	28,924	37.2%
Independent	Manuel Rodriguez	11	0.0%
Total votes		77,739	100%
Republican hold			

=== District 117 ===
Kevin Chambliss ran unopposed in the general election, and the election was canceled. He was elected.

=== District 118 ===
Florida House of Representatives election
Party	Candidate	Votes	%
Republican	Anthony Rodriguez (incumbent)	47,017	60.1%
Democratic	Ricky Junquera	31,261	39.9%
Total votes		78,278	100%
Republican hold			

=== District 119 ===
Florida House of Representatives election
Party	Candidate	Votes	%
Republican	Jaun Fernandeaz-Barquin (incumbent)	50,810	65.3%
Democratic	Imtiaz Ahmad Mohammad	26,979	34.7%
Total votes		77,789	100%
Republican hold			

=== District 120 ===
Florida House of Representatives election
Party	Candidate	Votes	%
Republican	James "Jim" Vernon Mooney	45,698	55.0%
Democratic	Clint Barras	37,426	45.0%
Total votes		83,124	100%
Republican hold			

== See also ==
- 2020 Florida elections
  - 2020 Florida Senate election
- Politics of Florida
  - Political party strength in Florida
  - Florida Democratic Party
  - Republican Party of Florida
- Government of Florida

== Notes ==
Partisan clients
