= 2020 Florida Senate election =

- November 3, 2020

20 of the 40 seats in the Florida Senate 21 seats needed for a majority
- Turnout: 38.62%
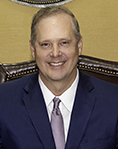

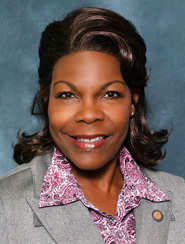
	Majority party	Minority party
Leader	Wilton Simpson	Audrey Gibson
Party	Republican	Democratic
Leader since	November 26, 2018	November 19, 2018
Leader's seat	10th-Trilby	6th-Jacksonville
Last election	23 seats, 53.99%	17 seats, 45.74%
Seats won	24	16
Seat change	▲1	▼1
Popular vote	2,663,076	2,642,318
Percentage	49.03%	48.65%
Swing	▼4.96%	▲2.91%
- Results: Republican gain Republican hold Democratic hold No election
President before election
Bill Galvano
Republican
Elected President
Wilton Simpson
Republican

The 2020 elections for the Florida Senate took place on Tuesday, November 3, 2020, to elect state senators from 20 of 40 districts. The Republican Party has held a Senate majority since 1995. The result was a one-seat gain for the Republicans, thus maintaining their majority.

The elections for U.S. President, U.S. House of Representatives, and the Florida House of Representatives were also held on this date.

Republican operatives, supported by Florida Power & Light, ran sham ghost candidates in three races. In District 37, former senator Frank Artiles had Alex Rodriguez placed on the ballot to successfully siphon votes from Senator José Javier Rodríguez. Both Artiles and Alex Rodriguez were charged and fined for electoral fraud.

== Predictions ==
Source	Ranking	As of
The Cook Political Report	Lean R	October 21, 2020

=== Competitive races ===
The most competitive races are expected to be the Democratic-held open Senate District 3 in North Florida, the Republican-held open District 9 to the northeast of Orlando, the special election in the Tampa area's open Republican-held District 20, the Democratic-held Senate District 37 in South Florida, and the Republican-held open District 39 in South Florida.

2016 Presidential Results and 2020 Candidates in Competitive Races:

Senate district	Clinton 2016 vote share	Trump 2016 vote share	2020 Democratic nominee	2020 Republican nominee
District 3	52.60% Clinton	43.95% Trump	Loranne Ausley	Marva Harris Preston
District 9	45.98% Clinton	49.87% Trump	Patricia Sigman	Jason Brodeur
District 20	43.99% Clinton	52.28% Trump	Kathy Lewis	Danny Burgess
District 37	59.55% Clinton	37.89% Trump	José Javier Rodríguez	Ileana Garcia
District 39	53.74% Clinton	43.49% Trump	Javier Fernandez	Ana Maria Rodriguez

== Overview ==
Party	Votes	%	Seats				
Party	Votes	%	Total before	Up	Won	Total after	+/−
Republican Party of Florida	2,663,076	49.03	23	10	11	24	+1
Florida Democratic Party	2,642,318	48.65	17	10	9	16	-1
Independent	125,497	2.31	0	0	0	0	-
Write-in	603	0.01	0	0	0	0	-
Total	5,431,494	100.00	40	20	20	40	±0
Source: Florida Division of Elections

Popular vote
Republican	49.03%
Democratic	48.65%
Other	2.32%

Senate seats
Republican	60%
Democratic	40%

=== Closest races ===
Seats where the margin of victory was under 10%:

1. District 37, 0.02% gain
2. District 9, 2.7%
3. District 3, 6.8%
4. District 20, 9.6%

== Primary election polling ==
=== District 27 - Republican ===
Poll source	Date(s) administered	Sample size (Note: Key: A – all adults RV – registered voters LV – likely voters V – unclear)	Margin of error	Heather Fitzhagen	Ray Rodriguez	Undecided
St. Pete Polls/Florida Politics	July 28, 2020	463 (LV)	± 4.6%	18%	59%	23%
Remington Research Group/Heather Fitzhagen (Note: Poll sponsored by Fitzhagen's campaign)	July 20, 2020	1,229 (LV)	± 3%	22%	44%	34%
Remington Research Group/Heather Fitzhagen	June 18–19, 2020	460 (LV)	± 4.5%	34%	24%	42%

=== District 29 - Democratic ===
Poll source	Date(s) administered	Sample size	Margin of error	Tina Polsky	Irving "Irv" Slosberg	Undecided
St. Pete Polls/Florida Politics	August 14, 2020	477 (LV)	± 4.5%	49%	37%	13%

=== District 39 - Democratic ===
Poll source	Date(s) administered	Sample size	Margin of error	Javier E. Fernandez	Daniel "Dan" Horton-Diaz	Undecided
St. Pete Polls/Florida Politics	August 1–2, 2020	203 (LV)	± 6.9%	24%	16%	61%

== Retiring incumbents ==
=== Democrats ===
- 3rd district: Bill Montford (term-limited)
- 29th district: Kevin Rader (retiring)
- 35th district: Oscar Braynon (term-limited)

=== Republicans ===
- 5th district: Rob Bradley (term-limited)
- 9th district: David Simmons (term-limited)
- 21st district: Bill Galvano (term-limited)
- 27th district: Lizbeth Benacquisto (term-limited)
- 39th district: Anitere Flores (term-limited)

== General election polling ==
=== District 3 ===
Poll source	Date(s) administered	Sample size	Margin of error	Loranne Ausley (D)	Marva Preston (R)	Undecided
St. Pete Polls/Florida Politics	October 17–18, 2020	948 (LV)	–	51%	44%	5%
ALG Research/Florida Senate Victory Fund/FDLCC (Note: The Florida Senate Victory Fund and the FDLCC supported Ausley prior to the sampling period)	October 15, 2020	503 (V)	–	48%	40%	–

=== District 9 ===
Poll source	Date(s) administered	Sample size	Margin of error	Jason Brodeur (R)	Patricia Sigman (D)	Jestine Ianotti (I)	Undecided
St. Pete Polls/Florida Politics	October 31 – November 1, 2020	522 (LV)	± 4.3%	42%	49%	2%	7%
St. Pete Polls/Florida Politics	October 17–18, 2020	490 (LV)	± 4.4%	43%	52%	–	5%
GQR Research/Florida Senate Victory Fund/FDLCC (Note: The Florida Senate Victory Fund and the FDLCC supported Sigman prior to the sampling period)	October 16, 2020	400 (V)	–	42%	42%	–	–

=== District 20 ===
Poll source	Date(s) administered	Sample size	Margin of error	Danny Burgess (R)	Kathy Lewis (D)	Undecided
St. Pete Polls/Florida Politics	October 24–25, 2020	644 (LV)	± 3.9%	45%	44%	12%

=== District 37 ===
Poll source	Date(s) administered	Sample size	Margin of error	José Javier Rodríguez (D)	Ileana Garcia (R)
SEA Research/Florida Senate Victory Fund/FDLCC (Note: The Florida Senate Victory Fund and the FDLCC supported Javier Rodriguez prior to the sampling period)	October 13, 2020	400 (V)	–	42%	37%

=== District 39 ===
Poll source	Date(s) administered	Sample size	Margin of error	Ana Maria Rodriguez (R)	Javier Fernandez (D)
GQR Research/Florida Senate Victory Fund/FDLCC (Note: The Florida Senate Victory Fund and the FDLCC supported Fernandez prior to the sampling period)	October 9, 2020	503 (V)	–	43%	43%
Tyson Group/Let's Preserve the American Dream PAC	September 8–11, 2020	– (V) (Note: Not yet released)	–	37%	31%
Tyson Group/Let's Preserve the American Dream PAC	July, 2020	– (V) (Note: Not yet released)	–	31%	28%

== Results ==
=== District 1 ===
Florida 2020 Senate Election
Party	Candidate	Votes	%
Republican	Douglas V. Broxson	185,380	65.3%
Democratic	Karen M. Butler	98,407	34.7%
Total votes		293,787	100%
Republican hold			

=== District 3 ===
2020 Florida's 3rd State Senate district candidate forum
No.	Date	Host	Moderator	Link	Democratic	Republican
Key: P Participant A Absent N Not invited I Invited W Withdrawn						
Key: P Participant A Absent N Not invited I Invited W Withdrawn					Loranne Ausley	Marva Preston
1	Sep. 22, 2020	League of Women Voters of Tallahassee; Tallahassee Democrat	Jim Rosica	YouTube	P	P

Florida 2020 Senate Election
Party	Candidate	Votes	%
Democratic	Loranne Ausley	137,609	53.4%
Republican	Marva Harris Preston	120,176	46.6%
Total votes		257,785	100%
Democratic hold			

=== District 5 ===
Florida 2020 Senate Election
Party	Candidate	Votes	%
Republican	Jennifer Bradley	194,198	74.8%
Democratic	Stacey L. Peters	65,568	25.2%
Total votes		259,766	100%
Republican hold			

=== District 7 ===
Florida 2020 Senate Election
Party	Candidate	Votes	%
Republican	Travis J. Hutson	212,577	61.7%
Democratic	Heather Hunter	131,763	38.3%
Independent	Richard Dembinsky (Write in)	13	0.0%
Total votes		344,353	100%
Republican hold			

=== District 9 ===
2020 Florida's 9th State Senate district debate
No.	Date	Host	Moderator	Link	Republican	Democratic
Key: P Participant A Absent N Not invited I Invited W Withdrawn						
Key: P Participant A Absent N Not invited I Invited W Withdrawn					Jason Brodeur	Patricia Sigman
1	Oct. 6, 2020	WESH	Greg Fox	YouTube	P	P

Florida 2020 Senate Election
Party	Candidate	Votes	%
Republican	Jason Brodeur	141,544	50.3%
Democratic	Patricia Sigman	133,900	47.6%
Independent	Jestine Iannotti	5,787	2.1%
Total votes		281,231	100%
Republican hold			

=== District 11 ===
Florida 2020 Senate Election
Party	Candidate	Votes	%
Democratic	Randolph Bracy	147,244	65.0%
Republican	Joshua Eli Adams	79,224	35.0%
Total votes		226,468	100%
Democratic hold			

=== District 13 ===
Florida 2020 Senate Election
Party	Candidate	Votes	%
Democratic	Linda Stewart	152,769	60.6%
Republican	Josh Anderson	99,134	39.4%
Total votes		251,903	100%
Democratic hold			

=== District 15 ===
Florida 2020 Senate Election
Party	Candidate	Votes	%
Democratic	Victor M. Torres	180,185	57.1%
Republican	Louis T. Minnis	123,153	39.0%
Independent	Mike James	12,207	3.9%
Total votes		315,545	100%
Democratic hold			

=== District 17 ===
Florida 2020 Senate Election
Party	Candidate	Votes	%
Republican	Debbie Mayfield	193,560	60.6%
Democratic	Scot Fretwell	114,515	35.9%
Independent	Phillip Snyder	11,323	3.5%
Total votes		319,398	100%
Republican hold			

=== District 19 ===
Florida 2020 Senate Election
Party	Candidate	Votes	%
Democratic	Darryl Ervin Rouson	174,343	68.7%
Independent	Christina Paylan	79,463	31.3%
Total votes		253,806	100%
Democratic hold			

=== District 20 ===
Florida 2020 Senate Election
Party	Candidate	Votes	%
Republican	Danny Burgess	141,607	54.8%
Democratic	Kathy Lewis	116,685	45.2%
Total votes		258,292	100%
Republican hold			

=== District 21 ===
Florida 2020 Senate Election
Party	Candidate	Votes	%
Republican	Jim Boyd	191,673	61.0%
Democratic	Anthony "Tony" Eldon	122,480	39.0%
Total votes		314,153	100%
Republican hold			

=== District 23 ===
Florida 2020 Senate Election
Party	Candidate	Votes	%
Republican	Joe Gruters	188,126	57.7%
Democratic	Katherine Norman	131,491	40.3%
Independent	Robert Kaplan	6,696	2.1%
Total votes		326,313	100%
Republican hold			

=== District 25 ===
Florida 2020 Senate Election
Party	Candidate	Votes	%
Republican	Gayle Harrell	168,063	58.7
Democratic	Corinna Robinson	118,211	41.3
Total votes		286,274	100.0
Republican hold			

=== District 27 ===
Florida 2020 Senate Election
Party	Candidate	Votes	%
Republican	Ray Rodrigues	176,954	60.5%
Democratic	Rachel Brown	115,537	39.5%
Total votes		292,491	100%
Republican hold			

=== District 29 ===
Florida 2020 Senate Election
Party	Candidate	Votes	%
Democratic	Tina Polsky	156,441	55.7%
Republican	Brian Norton	124,502	44.3%
Total votes		280,943	100%
Democratic hold			

=== District 31 ===
Florida 2020 Senate Election
Party	Candidate	Votes	%
Democratic	Lori Berman	156,495	62.2%
Republican	Tami Donnally	95,019	37.8%
Total votes		251,514	100%
Democratic hold			

=== District 35 ===
Florida 2020 Senate Election
Party	Candidate	Votes	%
Democratic	Shevrin "Shev" Jones	188,942	99.7%
Independent	Darien Hill (Write in)	590	0.3%
Total votes		189,532	100%
Democratic hold			

=== District 37 ===
Florida 2020 Senate Election
Party	Candidate	Votes	%
Republican	Ileana Garcia	104,630	48.53%
Democratic	José Javier Rodríguez (Incumbent)	104,598	48.51%
Independent	Alex Rodriguez	6,382	2.96%
Total votes		215,610	100%
Republican gain from Democratic			

=== District 39 ===
Florida 2020 Senate Election
Party	Candidate	Votes	%
Republican	Ana Maria Rodriguez	123,556	55.6%
Democratic	Javier E. Fernandez	95,135	42.8%
Independent	Celso D. Alfonso	3,639	1.6%
Total votes		222,330	100%
Republican hold			

== Notes ==
Partisan clients

== See also ==
- 2020 Florida elections
  - 2020 Florida House of Representatives election
- Politics of Florida
  - Political party strength in Florida
  - Florida Democratic Party
  - Republican Party of Florida
- Government of Florida
