= Susan Frantz =

American politician

Member of the Florida House of Representatives from the 78th district
- Incumbent
- Assumed office November 3, 2026
- Preceded by: Jenna Persons-Mulicka

Personal details
- Party: Republican
- Website: Campaign website

Susan Frantz is an American politician. A member of the Republican Party, she has served in the Florida House of Representatives since 2026, representing the 78th district. The district contains the Fort Myers area and parts of Lehigh Acres and Island Park. She is a businesswoman.
