= Richard Machek =

American politician

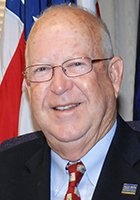

Member of the Florida House of Representatives from the 78th District
- In office November 7, 2000 – November 4, 2008
- Preceded by: Rick Minton
- Succeeded by: Kevin Rader

Personal details
- Born: October 2, 1937 Samsula, Florida
- Died: January 26, 2021 (aged 83)
- Party: Democratic
- Spouse: Wanda Davis
- Children: Carol, Kimberly
- Education: Seacrest High School; Palm Beach Junior College
- Occupation: farmer

Richard A. Machek (October 2, 1937 – January 26, 2021) was a Democratic politician who served as a member of the Florida House of Representatives from the 78th District from 2000 to 2008.

== Early life and career ==
Machek was born in Samsula, Florida, and graduated from Seacrest High School, later attending Palm Beach Junior College. He served in the U.S. Army for six months, and then five and a half years thereafter in the reserves, and began working at Mazzoni Farms, eventually managing the farm's production. Machek was elected to the Palm Beach County Soil and Water Conservation District Board of Supervisors, and in 1995, was appointed by Governor Lawton Chiles to the South Florida Water Management District Board of Governors.

== Florida House of Representatives ==
In 2000, Democratic State Representative Rick Minton was term-limited and could not run for re-election. Machek ran to succeed him in the 78th district, a heavily agricultural district that included parts of Highlands, Martin, Okeechobee, Palm Beach County, and St. Lucie, stretching from Delray Beach to Fort Pierce and Sebring. He faced former St. Lucie County Administrator Thomas Kindred in the Democratic primary, which was opened to all voters because no other candidates filed for the race. Machek narrowly defeated Kindred, winning 53 percent of the vote to his 47 percent.

Machek was unopposed for re-election in 2002 and 2004.

In 2006, Machek was challenged in the Democratic primary by chiropractor Steve Perman, who entered the race with the support of Democratic State Representative Irving Slosberg, an intraparty rival of Machek's. Machek ultimately defeated Perman by a narrow margin, winning renomination with 54 percent of the vote to Perman's 46 percent. No other candidates filed for the race, and Machek won the general election unopposed.

== Post-legislative career ==
Machek was term-limited in 2008 and could not seek re-election to a fifth term in the State House. Instead, he announced that he would challenge Palm Beach County Property Appraiser Gary Nikolits, a Republican, for re-election in the nonpartisan election. Machek was supported by most members of the County Commission, who routinely feuded with Nikolits, and significantly outraised the incumbent. Both the Palm Beach Post and the Sun Sentinel endorsed Nikolits over Machek. The Post praised Nikolits's qualifications, noting that "Machek doesn't know much about appraising property," and criticized Machek's proposal to "deliver 'a user-friendly office.'" The Sentinel noted that Machek was "a reputable state legislator and a nice enough guy," but "ha[d] no experience in the business," likewise praising Nikolits for "prov[ing] over and over again that he knows his stuff, is a competent leader and will not bend his principles, even in the face of stiff criticism." Nikolits ultimately defeated Machek by a wide margin, winning 60 percent of the vote to Machek's 40 percent.

In 2010, Machek was appointed to serve as the Florida State Director for Rural Development at the U.S. Department of Agriculture.

Machek died on January 26, 2021.
