= Steve Perman =

American politician

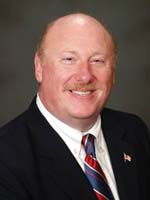

Member of the Florida House of Representatives from the 78th district
- In office November 2, 2010 – November 6, 2012
- Preceded by: Kevin Rader
- Succeeded by: Heather Fitzenhagen (redistricting)

Personal details
- Born: March 26, 1957 (age 69) Queens, New York
- Party: Democratic
- Spouse: Irene Budd
- Children: Benjamin, Arielle
- Education: Emory University; New York Chiropractic College (D.C.); University of Miami Miller School of Medicine
- Occupation: Chiropractic physician

Steven M. "Steve" Perman (born March 26, 1957) is a Democratic politician and chiropractic physician who served as a member of the Florida House of Representatives from the 78th District from 2010 to 2012.

== Early life and career ==
Perman was born in Queens, New York. He attended Oceanside High School and Emory University, and received his doctor of chiropractic degree from the New York Chiropractic College in 1979. He worked as a chiropractor and moved to Florida in 1993, where he continued his work.

== Florida House of Representatives ==
In 2006, Perman challenged incumbent State Representative Richard Machek for re-election in the Democratic primary in the 78th district, which stretched from coastal communities in Martin County, Palm Beach County, and St. Lucie to agricultural communities in the Everglades in Okeechobee County. He ran in the Democratic primary with the support of State Representative Irving Slosberg. Perman attacked Machek for his ineffectiveness in the legislature, and arguing that Democrats in the legislature had a "lack of energy and lack of quality communication. Ultimately, Machek narrowly defeated Perman, winning renomination with 54 percent of the vote.

Machek was term-limited in 2008, and Perman again ran to succeed him, facing Steve Nichol, a former journalist and director of communications for the Palm Beach County Clerk of the Court, and Kevin Rader, an insurance agent, in the Democratic primary. Rader narrowly defeated Perman, though the race was close and not initially called on election night, with Rader receiving 38 percent of the vote to Machek's 36 percent, and Nichol's 26 percent.

In 2010, Rader opted against seeking a second term to unsuccessfully run for the Florida Senate, and Perman was elected to succeed him unopposed.

Perman ran for re-election in 2012 in the 81st district, which was based exclusively in Palm Beach County, and Rader ran against him in the Democratic primary. The Sun Sentinel endorsed Perman over Rader, praising Perman for "do[ing] an adequate job representing his district's interests" and for "serv[ing] the state as a whole well," noting that his legislative record "shows a willingness to work with others across the aisle and shows promise of future bipartisan efforts." Rader ultimately defeated Perman by a wide margin, winning 57 percent of the vote to Perman's 43 percent.

In 2014, when Democratic State Representative Jim Waldman was term-limited, Perman ran to succeed him in the 96th district, which included Coconut Creek, Margate, and Parkland in northeastern Broward County. He faced Broward County Commissioner Kristin Jacobs in the Democratic primary, and won endorsements from Waldman, Congresswoman Lois Frankel, and Congressman Alcee Hastings. Jacobs ultimately defeated Perman in a landslide, winning 76 percent of the vote to his 24 percent.
