= Rick Minton =

American politician (born 1950)

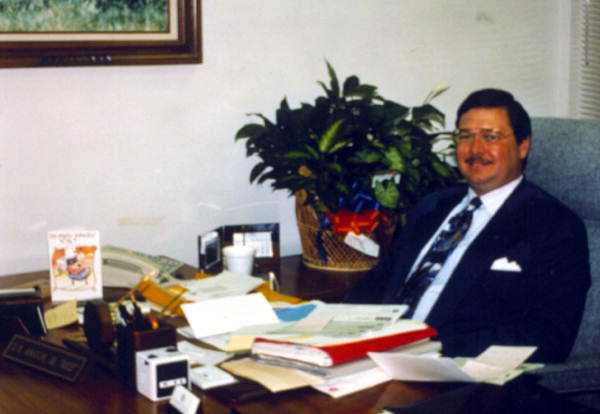

Member of the Florida House of Representatives from the 78th district
- In office November 3, 1992 – November 7, 2000
- Preceded by: Charlie Sembler (redistricting)
- Succeeded by: Richard Machek

Personal details
- Born: January 1, 1950 (age 76) Orlando, Florida
- Party: Democratic
- Education: University of Florida (BS, MS)
- Occupation: Public Servant

O. R. "Rick" Minton Jr. (born January 1, 1950) previously served as a Representative in the House of Representatives of the U.S. state of Florida. He currently lives in Fort Pierce, Florida with his family.

== Education ==
He received his bachelor's degree & Master's degree from the University of Florida.

Florida House of Representatives
Preceded by Charles W. "Charlie" Sembler II	Member of the Florida House of Representatives from the 78th district 1992–2000	Succeeded by Richard A. Machek
