= 2020 Florida elections =

Elections were held in Florida on Tuesday, November 3, 2020. Aside from its presidential primaries held on March 17, its primary elections were held on August 18, 2020.

In addition to the U.S. presidential race, Florida voters elected all of its seats to the U.S. House of Representatives, one seat on the Florida Supreme Court, 25 of 65 seats on the Florida District Courts of Appeal, all of the seats of the Florida House of Representatives, and 21 of 40 seats in the Florida Senate. Six ballot measures were also voted on. Neither of the state's two U.S. Senate seats were up for election in 2020.

To vote by mail, registered Florida voters had to request a ballot by October 24, 2020. As of early October some 5,547,170 voters had requested mail ballots.

== Federal offices ==
=== President of the United States ===
Florida has 29 electoral votes in the Electoral College. Donald Trump won all of them with 51% of the popular vote. The following people filed for presidency candidacy:

2020 Presidential Candidates
Candidate	Party	Incumbent
Donald J. Trump	Republican Party	√
Joe R. Biden Jr.	Democratic Party	
Joanne "Jo" M. Jorgensen	Libertarian Party	
Gloria E. La Riva	Party for Socialism and Liberation	
Roque "Rocky" De La Fuente	Reform Party	
Brian T. Carroll	(unaffiliated / independent)	
Shawn W. Howard	(unaffiliated / independent)	
Valeria L. McCray	(unaffiliated / independent)	
Jade Simmons	(unaffiliated / independent)	
Kasey Wells	(unaffiliated / independent)	

=== United States House of Representatives ===
There are 26 U.S. Representatives in Florida that were up for election in addition to two seats opened by retirements and one opened after the incumbent, Ross Spano, lost renomination in its Republican primary. 16 Republicans and 11 Democrats were returned. The Republican Party gained two districts, the 26th and the 27th.

2020 U.S. House of Representatives Candidates
Candidate	Party	District	Incumbent
Gus M. Bilirakis	Republican Party	12	√
Kimberly Walker	Democratic Party	12	
Ardian Zika	Republican Party	37	√
Tammy Garcia	Democratic Party	37	

== State offices ==
=== State Judiciary ===
A retention election occurred for one of seven seats on the Supreme Court of Florida. The incumbent, Carlos G. Muñiz, filed for re-election. He won another 6-year term with 66% of the votes.

Shall Justice Carlos G. Muniz be retained in Office?
Choice	Votes	%
For	6,297,753	65.74
Against	3,281,468	34.26
Total	9,579,221	100.00

Retention results by county Yes: 70–80%; 60–70%; 50–60%

=== State legislature ===
All 120 seats of the Florida House of Representatives and 21 of 40 seats of the Florida Senate are up for election. The outcome of this election could affect partisan balance during post-census redistricting.

==== State senate ====
20 out of 40 seats were up for election in the state Senate with one special election. Before the election the composition of the state Senate was:

Party	# of seats
Republican	23
Democratic	17
Total	40

After the election, the composition was:

Party	# of seats
Republican	24
Democratic	16
Total	40

==== House of Representatives ====
All 120 seats in the state House were up for election. Before the election the composition of the state House was:

Party	# of seats
Republican	71
Democratic	46
Total	120 (Note: Including 3 vacancies)

After the election, the composition was:

Party	# of seats
Republican	78
Democratic	42
Total	120

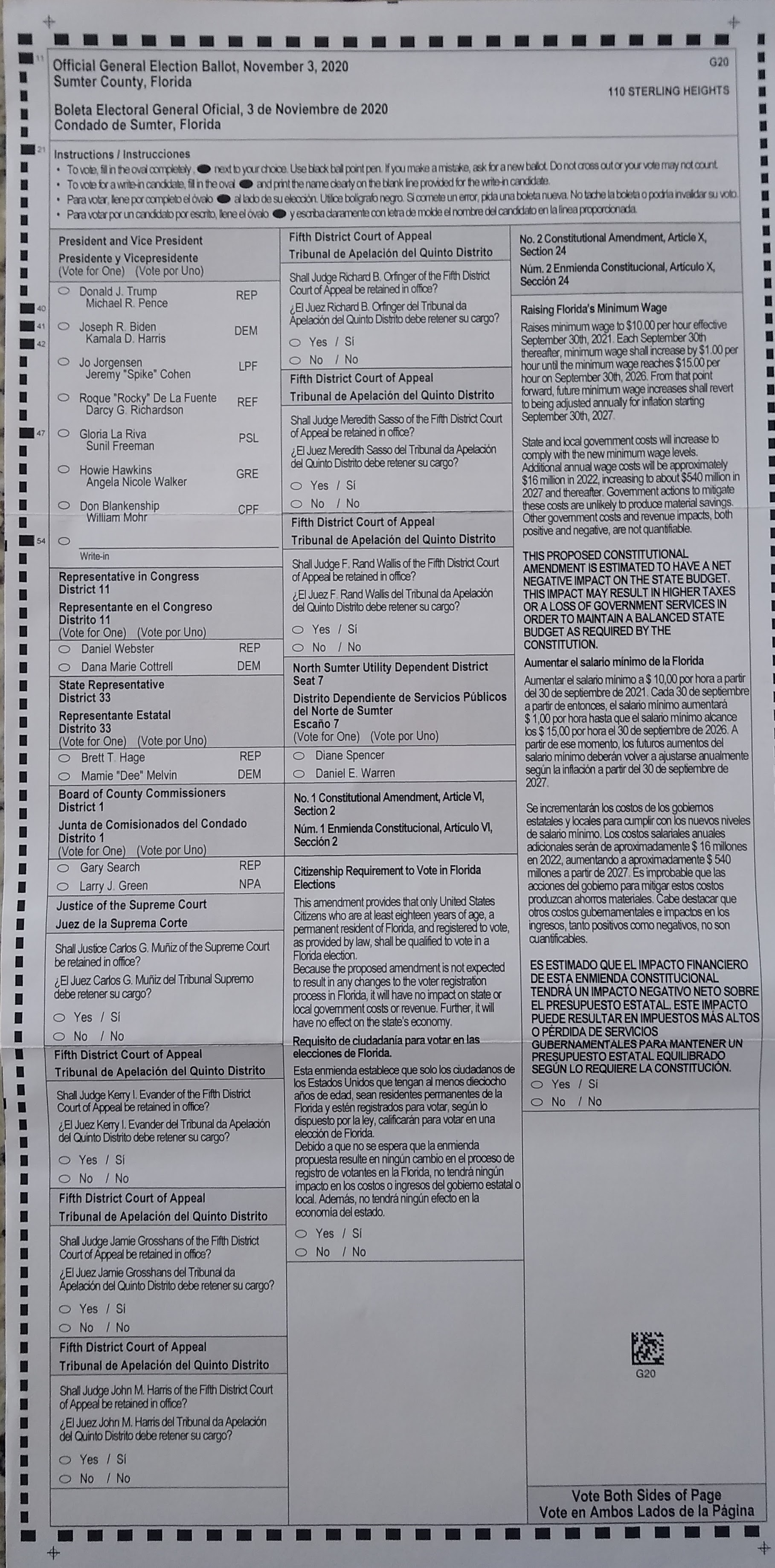
A blank 2020 General Election Ballot from Sumter County.

== Ballot measures ==
To pass, any state constitutional amendment requires 60% of the vote.

=== Amendment 1 ===
Citizen Requirement for Voting Initiative would enshrine in the state constitution the exclusivity of voting rights for U.S. Citizens.

Amendment 1
Choice	Votes	%
For	8,307,109	79.29
Against	2,169,684	20.71
Required majority		60.00
Total	10,476,793	100.00

=== Amendment 2 ===
$15 Minimum Wage Initiative would alter the state's constitution to guarantee a gradual raise of the minimum wage to $15 per hour by 2026.

Amendment 2
Choice	Votes	%
For	6,391,753	60.82
Against	4,117,815	39.18
Required majority		60.00
Total	10,509,568	100.00

=== Amendment 3 ===
Top-Two Open Primaries Initiative would implement the contemporary Californian primary system, opening primaries to all votes regardless of party registration, placing candidates of all parties on the same ballot and advancing the first-place and second-place finishers to the general election regardless of party affiliation. In addition, if only two candidates filed for the primary, this system would cancel the primary and automatically send them to the general election.

Amendment 3
Choice	Votes	%
For	5,854,468	57.03
Against	4,410,768	42.97
Required majority		60.00
Total	10,265,236	100.00

=== Amendment 4 ===
Require Constitutional Amendments to be Passed Twice would require that any further amendments would need to succeed in two different elections to be ratified.

Amendment 4
Choice	Votes	%
For	4,853,402	47.53
Against	5,356,792	52.47
Required majority		60.00
Total	10,210,194	100.00

=== Amendment 5 ===
Extend "Save Our Homes" Portability Period Amendment would increase the period during which a person may transfer "Save Our Homes" benefits to a new homestead property from two years to three years.

Amendment 5
Choice	Votes	%
For	7,484,104	74.49
Against	2,562,387	25.51
Required majority		60.00
Total	10,046,491	100.00

=== Amendment 6 ===
Homestead Property Tax Discount for Spouses of Deceased Veterans Amendment would allow a homestead property tax discount to be transferred to the surviving spouse of a deceased veteran.

Amendment 6
Choice	Votes	%
For	9,305,503	89.73
Against	1,065,308	10.27
Required majority		60.00
Total	10,370,811	100.00

=== Polling ===
The highlighted result in any poll is whichever is closer to its threshold (40% for 'against' and 60% for 'for' with respect to a given amendment).

Amendment 1

Poll source	Date(s) administered	Sample size (Note: Key: A – all adults RV – registered voters LV – likely voters V – unclear)	Margin of error	For Florida Amendment 1	Against Florida Amendment 1	Undecided
Civiqs/Daily Kos	October 17–20, 2020	863 (LV)	± 3.5%	53%	39%	9%
University of North Florida	October 1–4, 2020	3,091 (LV)	–	78% (Note: Questions in this poll were preceded by the pollster's assessment of each measure's potential effects beforehand)	18%	2% (Note: Includes "Refused")
St. Leo University Polling Institute	November 13–18, 2019	500 (A)	± 4.5%	80%	10%	9%

Amendment 2

Poll source	Date(s) administered	Sample size	Margin of error	For Florida Amendment 2	Against Florida Amendment 2	Other	Undecided
St. Pete Polls	October 29–30, 2020	2,758 (LV)	± 1.9%	58%	35%	–	8%
Monmouth University	October 24–28, 2020	509 (RV)	± 4.7%	63%	32%	2% (Note: Would not vote with 2%)	4%
Florida Atlantic University	October 24–25, 2020	937 (LV)	± 3.1%	62%	38%	–	8%
Civiqs/Daily Kos	October 17–20, 2020	863 (LV)	± 3.5%	57%	38%	–	4%
Ipsos/Pure Spectrum	October 7–15, 2020	1,001 (A)	± 3.5%	70%	21%	–	9%
Emerson College	October 10–12, 2020	690 (LV)	± 3.7%	52%	31%	–	11%
University of North Florida	October 1–4, 2020	3,055 (LV)	–	60%	37%	–	3% (Note: Includes "Refused")
Cherry Communications/Florida Chamber of Commerce (Note: This poll's sponsor opposed this amendment prior to the sampling period)	September 23–29, 2020	604 (LV)	± 4%	66%	–	–	–
St. Pete Polls	September 21–22, 2020	2,906 (LV)	± 1.8%	65%	23%	–	13%
Monmouth University	September 10–13, 2020	428 (RV)	± 4.7%	67%	26%	1% (Note: Would not vote with 1%)	6%
St. Pete Polls/Florida Politics	May 26–27, 2020	4,763 (RV)	± 1.4%	64%	24%	–	12%
St. Leo University Polling Institute	November 13–18, 2019	500 (A)	± 4.5%	63%	26%	–	11%
St. Pete Polls	May 6 – June 1, 2019	3,790 (RV)	± 1.6%	58%	35%	–	7%

Amendment 3

Poll source	Date(s) administered	Sample size	Margin of error	For Florida Amendment 3	Against Florida Amendment 3	Other	Undecided
St. Pete Polls	October 29–30, 2020	2,758 (LV)	± 1.9%	48%	40%	–	12%
Monmouth University	October 24–28, 2020	509 (RV)	± 4.7%	53%	30%	2% (Note: Would not vote with 2%)	15%
Florida Atlantic University	October 24–25, 2020	937 (LV)	± 3.1%	58%	29%	–	13%
St. Pete Polls/Florida Politics	October 21–22, 2020	2,527 (LV)	± 2%	37%	44%	–	19%
Civiqs/Daily Kos	October 17–20, 2020	863 (LV)	± 3.5%	51%	36%	–	13%
University of North Florida	October 1–4, 2020	2,994 (LV)	–	58%	36%	–	6% (Note: Includes "Refused")
Cherry Communications/Florida Chamber of Commerce (Note: This poll's sponsor opposed this amendment prior to the sampling period)	September 23–29, 2020	604 (LV)	± 4%	61%	–	–	–
St. Pete Polls	September 21–22, 2020	2,906 (LV)	± 1.8%	46%	35%	–	19%
Monmouth University	September 10–13, 2020	428 (RV)	± 4.7%	63%	21%	1% (Note: Would not vote with 1%)	15%
St. Pete Polls/Florida Politics	May 26–27, 2020	4,763 (RV)	± 1.4%	35%	44%	–	20%
St. Pete Polls	October 7–10, 2019	3,283 (RV)	± 1.7%	38%	48%	–	14%
St. Pete Polls	May 6 – June 1, 2019	3,790 (RV)	± 1.6%	59%	26%	–	14%

Amendment 4

Poll source	Date(s) administered	Sample size	Margin of error	For Florida Amendment 4	Against Florida Amendment 4	Undecided
University of North Florida	October 1–4, 2020	2,943 (LV)	–	52%	41%	7% (Note: Includes "Refused")
Cherry Communications/Florida Chamber of Commerce (Note: This poll's sponsor supported this amendment prior to the sampling period)	September 23–29, 2020	604 (LV)	± 4%	61%	–	–
St. Pete Polls	September 21–22, 2020	2,906 (LV)	± 1.8%	44%	31%	25%
St. Pete Polls	October 7–10, 2019	3,283 (RV)	± 1.7%	49%	30%	21%

Amendment 5

Poll source	Date(s) administered	Sample size	Margin of error	For Florida Amendment 5	Against Florida Amendment 5	Undecided
University of North Florida	October 1–4, 2020	2,928 (LV)	–	67%	26%	7% (Note: Includes "Refused")

Amendment 6

Poll source	Date(s) administered	Sample size	Margin of error	For Florida Amendment 6	Against Florida Amendment 6	Undecided
University of North Florida	October 1–4, 2020	2,913 (LV)	–	88%	8%	4% (Note: Includes "Refused")

== See also ==
- Elections in Florida
- Bilingual elections requirement for Florida (per Voting Rights Act Amendments of 2006)
- Politics of Florida
  - Political party strength in Florida
  - Florida Democratic Party
  - Republican Party of Florida
- Government of Florida

== Notes ==
Partisan clients
