= Florida's 78th House of Representatives district =

Florida district

Florida's 78th State House of Representatives district
Representative
Susan Frantz; R

Florida's 78th House of Representatives district elects one member of the Florida House of Representatives. It contains parts of Lee County.

== Members ==
- Charlie Sembler (1990–1992)
- Rick Minton (1992–2000)
- Richard Machek (2000–2008)
- Kevin Rader (2008–2010)
- Steve Perman (2010–2012)
- Heather Fitzenhagen (2012–2020)
- Jenna Persons-Mulicka (2020-2026)
- Susan Frantz (2026-present)
