= Heather Fitzenhagen =

American politician

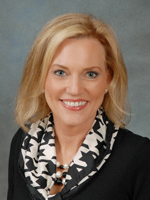

Member of the Florida House of Representatives from the 78th district
- In office November 6, 2012 – November 3, 2020
- Preceded by: Steve Perman (redistricting)
- Succeeded by: Jenna Persons-Mulicka

Personal details
- Born: October 8, 1960 (age 65) Dallas, Texas
- Party: Republican
- Spouse: Richard D. DeBoest
- Children: Alexander "Zan" DeBoest, Olivia DeBoest
- Education: Hollins University (BA); Nova Southeastern University (JD)
- Profession: Attorney

Heather Dawes Fitzenhagen (born October 8, 1960) is a Republican politician from Florida. She represented the 78th District, encompassing Fort Myers, in the Florida House of Representatives from 2012 to 2020.

== History ==
Fitzenhagen was born in Dallas, Texas, and attended Hollins University in Roanoke, Virginia, before moving to the state of Florida in 1987. She then attended the Shepard Broad Law Center, the law school at Nova Southeastern University. Afterwards, she started Resolution Strategies, a mediation and arbitration company, and worked as the Marketing Director at the Condo & HOA Law Group, PLLC.

== Florida House of Representatives ==
In 2012, she ran for the Florida House of Representatives from the newly created 78th District, based in the city of Fort Myers. Fitzenhagen faced Jonathan Martin in the Republican primary, whom she was able to defeat with 69% of the vote. In the general election, she had Independent Party of Florida nominee Kerry Babb as her opponent, and she easily won, winning 67% of the vote.

In 2013, Fitzenhagen supported a bill in the Florida legislature that would allow U.S. veterans using the Post-9/11 Veterans Educational Assistance Act of 2008 to pay for their college educations to receive in-state tuition instead of out-of-state tuition, regardless of whether the veteran met the residency requirements. She said that the schools would benefit by "having the kind of leadership and the kind of character in the classroom that a veteran will bring." During the 2014 legislative session, Fitzenhagen authored legislation that would allow people with no criminal record "to carry a firearm without a permit" during natural disasters. When the House passed the legislation, she declared, "The bells of liberty are surely ringing throughout Florida today." The Florida Sheriffs Association opposed the legislation, however, calling for clarification before it was signed into law.

In 2014, Fitzenhagen cosponsored a bill in the Florida Legislature that made an application to Congress to convene an Article V Convention to propose amendments to the United States Constitution for the limited purpose of proposing a Single Subject Amendment. This bill passed the Florida Legislature making Florida the first state in United States history to apply for an Article V Convention to propose this amendment to the United States Constitution. See the April 23, 2014, entry in the List of state applications for an Article V Convention.

In 2020, Fitzenhagen ran for Congress in Florida's 19th congressional district for the 2020 United States House of Representatives elections but withdrew from the race in order to run for the Florida State Senate to succeed Lizbeth Benacquisto, who did not seek reelection. She was defeated in the Republican primary by state Representative Ray Rodrigues.

== Later career ==
Fitzenhagen joined personal injury law firm Morgan & Morgan in July 2014.

Florida House of Representatives
Preceded by Steve Perman	Member of the Florida House of Representatives from the 78th district 2012–2020	Succeeded by Jenna Persons
