= Jenna Persons-Mulicka =

American politician

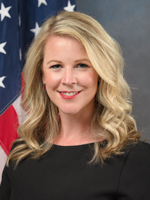

Lee County Supervisor of Elections
- Incumbent
- Assumed office May 21, 2026
- Preceded by: Tommy Doyle

Member of the Florida House of Representatives from the 78th district
- In office November 3, 2020 – May 20, 2026
- Preceded by: Heather Fitzenhagen
- Succeeded by: Vacant

Personal details
- Born: Jenna Persons; February 18, 1983 (age 43) Naples, Florida, U.S.
- Party: Republican
- Spouse: David Mulicka
- Children: 1
- Education: Evangel University (BA, BA); George Washington University (JD)

Jenna Persons-Mulicka (born February 18, 1983) is an American attorney and politician who has served as the Lee County Supervisor of Elections since 2026. She previously served as a member of the Florida House of Representatives from the 78th district from 2020 to 2026, when she resigned after being appointed Supervisor of Elections by Governor Ron DeSantis.

== Early life and education ==
Persons-Mulicka was born in Naples, Florida and raised in Fort Myers, where she graduated from Fort Myers Senior High School. She earned a Bachelor of Arts degree in journalism and another in government from Evangel University in Springfield, Missouri, followed by a Juris Doctor from the George Washington University Law School.

== Career ==
Since 2012, Persons-Mulicka has been an attorney and partner Strayhorn & Persons, where she specializes in business law, real estate, planning, and zoning. She was elected to the Florida House of Representatives in November 2020. She resigned in May, 2026, after being appointed as Lee County Supervisor of Elections.
