= Kevin Rader (politician) =

American politician (born 1968)

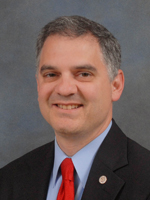

Member of the Florida Senate from the 29th district
- In office November 8, 2016 – November 3, 2020
- Preceded by: Redistricted
- Succeeded by: Tina Polsky

Member of the Florida House of Representatives
- In office November 6, 2012 – November 8, 2016
- Preceded by: Redistricted
- Succeeded by: Joseph Abruzzo
- Constituency: 81st district
- In office November 4, 2008 – November 2, 2010
- Preceded by: Richard Machek
- Succeeded by: Steve Perman
- Constituency: 78th district

Personal details
- Born: October 6, 1968 (age 57) Detroit, Michigan, U.S.
- Party: Democratic
- Spouse: Amy Rader
- Children: 5
- Education: Boston University (BA)
- Profession: Insurance agent

Kevin Rader (born October 6, 1968) is an American politician from Florida. A Democrat, he represented parts of northern Broward and southern Palm Beach Counties in the Florida House from 2008 to 2010 and again from 2012 to 2016. He was elected to one term in the Florida Senate, serving from 2016 until he retired in 2020.

== Early life and education ==
Rader was born in Detroit, Michigan, and moved to Florida in 1972, where he graduated from Lake Brantley High School in Altamonte Springs in 1986. After high school, he attended Boston University, graduating with his bachelor's degree in 1990.

== Career ==
=== Florida House of Representatives ===
In 2000, when incumbent State Representative Debby Sanderson ran for a seat in the Florida Senate rather than seeking re-election, an open seat was created in the 91st District, based in Broward County and Palm Beach County. Rader won the Democratic primary and advanced to the general election, where he faced Connie Mack IV, the Republican nominee and the son of retiring United States Senator Connie Mack III. The Sun-Sentinel criticized both candidates, opining that, regardless of the victor, the district would be represented by a "young, inexperienced representative." Despite this, however, the paper endorsed Mack, hoping that Republicans in the legislature would "make sure Mack learns legislative procedure and help the son of the senator become a competent state representative." Mack ended up defeating Rader by a wide margin, with Rader only receiving 44% of the vote to his opponent's 56%.

Rader experienced more success, however, when State Representative Richard Machek was unable to seek another term in 2008, and retired; Rader ran to succeed him in the 78th District, which was based in northern Broward County, western Martin County, eastern Okeechobee County, western Palm Beach County, and central St. Lucie County. In the Democratic primary, Rader faced Steve Perman and Steve Nichol, whom he was narrowly able to defeat, winning 38% of the vote to Perman's 36% and Nichol's 26%. He advanced to the general election, where he was elected to his first term unopposed.

=== Florida Senate candidacy ===
When State Senator Dave Aronberg declined to seek another term in the legislature to instead run for attorney general in 2010, Rader ran to succeed him in the 27th District, which stretched from Boynton Beach to Cape Coral and included parts of Charlotte County, Glades County, Lee County, and Palm Beach County. In the Democratic primary, Rader faced retired lawyer and 2008 legislature candidate Peter Burkert. During the campaign, The Palm Beach Post endorsed Burkert and strongly criticized Rader for his co-sponsorship of "one of the worst insurance giveaway bills, the so-called 'State Farm Bill' that would have allowed the state's 15 largest property insurers to charge basically whatever they wanted." Rader defeated Burkert by a slim margin, winning 53% of the vote to Burkert's 47% and advancing to the general election, where he faced former Wellington Village Councilwoman Lizbeth Benacquisto, the Republican nominee. During the election, Rader accused Benacquisto of committing 105 election law violations, which Politifact rated as a true statement, and of supporting making abortion illegal in all cases, "including rape, incest, even to save a woman's life," which Politifact rated as "mostly true." Benacquisto condemned Rader's attack, revealing that she had been raped while she was in college and that his attacks "really crossed the line," while still maintaining her opposition to abortion. Benacquisto ultimately defeated Rader, winning 54% of the vote to his 46%.

=== Return to the Florida House ===
In 2012, when the state legislative districts were reconfigured, Rader opted to run for a second nonconsecutive term in the 81st District, which contained much of the territory that he had previously represented in Palm Beach County. He faced Steve Perman, his successor as State Representative in the 78th District, in the Democratic primary. During the course of the campaign, the business community split in its support for the candidates, with Rader scoring the endorsement of the Florida Chamber of Commerce and Perman gaining the support of the Associated Industries of Florida. Rader defeated Perman by a wide margin, winning 57% of the vote to Perman's 43%, and advancing to the general election, where he faced James O'Hara, the Republican nominee.

Throughout the 2013 Legislative Session, Rader served on five committees, Health Quality Subcommittee, Insurance and Banking Subcommittee, State Affairs Committee, Agriculture and Natural Resources Subcommittee (Democratic Ranking Member), and the Healthy Families Subcommittee.

=== Florida Senate ===
In 2016, Rader ran for the Florida Senate seat vacated by Joseph Abruzzo, who opted to run for Rader's House seat instead of re-election in his reconfigured Senate district. Rader defeated teacher Mindy Koch in the Democratic primary with 58.5% of the vote. He won the general election without opposition.

Rader decided to retire from the Senate in 2020 and opted not to run for re-election.

Florida House of Representatives
Preceded by Richard Machek	Member of the Florida House of Representatives from the 78th district 2008–2010	Succeeded by Steve Perman
Preceded by Gayle Harrell	Member of the Florida House of Representatives from the 81st district 2012–2016	Succeeded by Joseph Abruzzo
Florida Senate
Preceded by Jeremy Ring	Member of the Florida Senate from the 29th district 2016–2020	Succeeded by Tina Polsky
