= Politics of Florida =

United States presidential election results for Florida
Year	Republican / Whig		Democratic		Third party(ies)	
Year	No.	%	No.	%	No.	%
1848	4,120	57.20%	3,083	42.80%	0	0.00%
1852	2,875	39.97%	4,318	60.03%	0	0.00%
1856	0	0.00%	6,358	56.81%	4,833	43.19%
1860	0	0.00%	223	1.68%	13,078	98.32%
1872	17,763	53.52%	15,427	46.48%	0	0.00%
1876	23,849	50.99%	22,927	49.01%	0	0.00%
1880	23,654	45.83%	27,964	54.17%	0	0.00%
1884	28,031	46.73%	31,769	52.96%	190	0.32%
1888	26,529	39.89%	39,557	59.48%	414	0.62%
1892	0	0.00%	30,153	85.01%	5,318	14.99%
1896	11,298	24.30%	32,756	70.46%	2,434	5.24%
1900	7,355	18.55%	28,273	71.31%	4,021	10.14%
1904	8,314	21.15%	27,046	68.80%	3,949	10.05%
1908	10,654	21.58%	31,104	63.01%	7,602	15.40%
1912	4,279	8.42%	35,343	69.52%	11,215	22.06%
1916	14,611	18.10%	55,984	69.34%	10,139	12.56%
1920	44,853	30.79%	90,515	62.13%	10,313	7.08%
1924	30,633	28.06%	62,083	56.88%	16,438	15.06%
1928	144,168	56.83%	101,764	40.12%	7,742	3.05%
1932	69,170	25.04%	206,307	74.68%	775	0.28%
1936	78,248	23.90%	249,117	76.08%	67	0.02%
1940	126,158	25.99%	359,334	74.01%	0	0.00%
1944	143,215	29.68%	339,377	70.32%	0	0.00%
1948	194,280	33.63%	281,988	48.82%	101,375	17.55%
1952	544,036	54.99%	444,950	44.97%	351	0.04%
1956	643,849	57.27%	480,371	42.73%	0	0.00%
1960	795,476	51.51%	748,700	48.49%	0	0.00%
1964	905,941	48.85%	948,540	51.15%	0	0.00%
1968	886,804	40.53%	676,794	30.93%	624,207	28.53%
1972	1,857,759	71.91%	718,117	27.80%	7,407	0.29%
1976	1,469,531	46.64%	1,636,000	51.93%	45,100	1.43%
1980	2,046,951	55.52%	1,419,475	38.50%	220,600	5.98%
1984	2,730,350	65.32%	1,448,816	34.66%	885	0.02%
1988	2,618,885	60.87%	1,656,701	38.51%	26,727	0.62%
1992	2,173,310	40.89%	2,072,698	39.00%	1,068,384	20.10%
1996	2,244,536	42.32%	2,546,870	48.02%	512,388	9.66%
2000	2,912,790	48.85%	2,912,253	48.84%	138,067	2.32%
2004	3,964,522	52.10%	3,583,544	47.09%	61,744	0.81%
2008	4,046,219	48.10%	4,282,367	50.91%	83,662	0.99%
2012	4,163,447	49.03%	4,237,756	49.90%	90,972	1.07%
2016	4,617,886	48.60%	4,504,975	47.41%	379,886	4.00%
2020	5,668,731	51.11%	5,297,045	47.76%	125,982	1.14%
2024	6,110,125	55.87%	4,683,038	42.82%	142,302	1.30%

Politics of Florida reflect a state that has experienced conflict between its liberal southern region and its traditionally conservative northern region. Politics often revolve around budgeting and how money for budgets should be raised. Today, it is considered a reliably Republican state in state and national elections.

Florida was originally part of the Solid South, as Democrats overwhelmingly won state and federal elections during the hundred years following the Civil War. However, in 1937, the requirement to pay a poll tax was repealed by the state legislature, allowing poorer Floridians to vote. This coupled with industrialization, urbanization, and a growing tourist industry in the mid-20th century that attracted Northern retirees, contributed to the state becoming electorally competitive earlier than the rest of the South. Since 1928, the state has only voted for the losing presidential candidate three times, all for losing Republicans in 1960, 1992, and 2020. In 1966, Claude Kirk was elected the first Republican governor of Florida since Reconstruction. This was followed in 1968, with Republicans winning a Senate seat in the state for the first time since Reconstruction.

The Florida Elections Commission was established in 1973. In 2005, Jeb Bush signed a bill to abolish primary runoff elections, resulting in all primary and general elections being determined by plurality rather than majority.

The state is dominated by Republicans on the state level, as Democrats have not held the governorship or either house of the legislature since 1999. Republicans currently have veto-proof majorities in both houses of the Florida legislature. However, the state has become increasingly red since the late 2010s, as in 2018, Republicans captured both Senate seats in the state for the first time since Reconstruction. In 2020, Florida voted 7.8 points right of the nation as a whole, the furthest it has voted from the nation since 1988, and it was the first election since 1992 that Florida backed the losing candidate. In 2022, Republicans won their largest statewide victories since Reconstruction and neared 60% of the vote. In 2021, registered Republicans surpassed Democrats for the first time in state history. Florida voted over 10% to the right of the nation in the 2024 presidential election, in which Trump carried the state by double digits. Florida approved its lottery by amending the constitution in 1984. It approved slot machines in Broward and Miami-Dade County in 2004. It has disapproved casinos (outside of sovereign Seminole and Miccosukee tribal areas) three times: 1978, 1986, and 1994.

== Federal representation ==
Florida currently has 28 House districts. In the 118th Congress, seven of Florida's seats are held by Democrats and 20 are held by Republicans and one is currently vacant:

- The 1st district, represented by Jimmy Patronis (R)
- The 2nd district, represented by Neal Dunn (R)
- The 3rd district, represented by Kat Cammack (R)
- The 4th district, represented by Aaron Bean (R)
- The 5th district, represented by John Rutherford (R)
- The 6th district, represented by Randy Fine (R)
- The 7th district, represented by Cory Mills (R)
- The 8th district, represented by Mike Haridopolos (R)
- The 9th district, represented by Darren Soto (D)
- The 10th district, represented by Maxwell Frost (D)
- The 11th district, represented by Daniel Webster (R)
- The 12th district, represented by Gus Bilirakis (R)
- The 13th district, represented by Anna Paulina Luna (R)
- The 14th district, represented by Kathy Castor (D)
- The 15th district, represented by Laurel Lee (R)
- The 16th district, represented by Vern Buchanan (R)
- The 17th district, represented by Greg Steube (R)
- The 18th district, represented by Scott Franklin (R)
- The 19th district, represented by Byron Donalds (R)
- The 20th district, currently vacant
- The 21st district, represented by Brian Mast (R)
- The 22nd district, represented by Lois Frankel (D)
- The 23rd district, represented by Jared Moskowitz (D)
- The 24th district, represented by Frederica Wilson (D)
- The 25th district, represented by Debbie Wasserman Schultz (D)
- The 26th district, represented by Mario Diaz-Balart (R)
- The 27th district, represented by Maria Elvira Salazar (R)
- The 28th district, represented by Carlos A. Giménez (R)

Florida's two United States senators are Republicans Rick Scott and Ashley Moody, serving since 2019 and 2025, respectively.

Florida is part of the United States District Court for the Northern District of Florida, United States District Court for the Middle District of Florida, and the United States District Court for the Southern District of Florida in the federal judiciary. The district's cases are appealed to the Atlanta-based United States Court of Appeals for the Eleventh Circuit.

== Issues ==
=== Budget ===
Florida is one of the nine states that do not impose a personal income tax (list of others). The state had imposed a tax on "intangible personal property" (stocks, bonds, mutual funds, money market funds, etc.), but this tax was abolished after 2006. The state sales tax rate is 6%. Local governments may levy an additional local option sales tax of up to 1.5%. A locale's use tax rate is the same as its sales tax rate, including local options, if any. Use taxes are payable for purchases made out of state and brought into Florida within six months of the purchase date. Documentary stamps are required on deed transfers and mortgages. Other taxes include corporate income, communication services, unemployment, solid waste, insurance premium, pollutants, and various fuel taxes.

Florida has a balanced budget provision, requiring the state not to have a budget deficit. The requirement for a balanced budget does not appear as such in the Florida Constitution. Article VII, Section 1(d), Florida Constitution, provides: "Provision shall be made by law for raising sufficient revenue to defray the expenses of the state for each fiscal period." Article III, Section 19(a), Florida Constitution, provides for "Annual Budgeting." These two provisions, when read together, form the basis for the balanced annual budget requirement.

Florida's state budget is funded one-third from General Revenue and two-thirds from hundreds of trust funds. The General Revenue portion of Florida's state budget is funded primarily by sales tax, while local governments also have their own respective budgets funded primarily by property taxes. The annual state budget is constructed by the legislature and signed into law by the governor who administers it. The state budget for 2008-9 was $66 billion.

In 2008, the state was one of four that had fully funded pension systems for government employees, including teachers. There are five classes of state employees for pension investment: Regular and Special Risk Administrative employees accrue retirement benefits at 1.6–1.68% per year; Senior Management, 2%; Special Risk employees, such as police and firefighters, 3%; and elected officers, including judges and legislative at 3% to 3.3%. The higher rate for the latter is to encourage early retirement. In 2010 there were 304,000 state retirees and 655,000 active employees. The average teacher's retirement check is $1,868 monthly. The average regular-class retiree gets $970 per month.

In 2011 to 2012 fiscal year, the state collected over $2.2 billion from the tax on gasoline.

In 2011, Medicaid costs were 20% of the budget. These are mandated by the federal government. While the state administers the program, it has no actual control over expenses. From 2000 to 2010, Medicaid costs rose from $8 billion to $18 billion.

Education costs were 30% of the budget.

The $70 billion budget for 2010–11 contained the following allocations:

- Health and Social Services $30 billion
- Education $21.2 billion
- Transportation $7.9 billion
- Criminal Justice and Corrections $4.5 billion
- General government $4 billion
- Natural Resources and Environment $3 billion
- Reserves $2.28 billion
- Courts $459 million

In 2011, undocumented immigrants were estimated to cost the Florida government $700 million. This included $548 million for children (excluding American-born children of undocumented aliens). Average student cost is $9,035. There are an estimated 60,750 undocumented immigrant children of school age. There are 5,641 undocumented in Florida prisons at an average cost of $18,980 annually, for a total of $107 million. A 2003 study indicated unpaid hospital costs of $40 million annually.

High-level state officers use one of two airplanes to get around Florida. Flights take 90 minutes to get from the capital at Tallahassee to Miami. In February 2011, Governor Scott directed the sale of both airplanes.

=== Employees ===
In 2011, as a result of Governor Rick Scott's executive order, the department required that all workers be verified as U.S. citizens with e-verify. This applied to contracts and funds otherwise under the jurisdiction of local government.

== Statutes ==
=== Real estate ===
Florida is one of several states where the courts are required to be involved in every step of the foreclosure process. By 2012, it took three years to complete the process. In nonjudicial states, it takes an average of 100 days. As a result of the United States housing bubble, there is a large backlog of housing that is in the foreclosure process but unavailable to the market. This overhang has had a detrimental effect on the housing market.

=== Gun laws ===
Florida is considered "accommodating" to guns, by national standards. There are 56 laws relating to owning, transporting, and using guns. Open carrying of firearms is legal with restrictions. Convicted felons have few rights to gun possession.

=== Merchandising alcohol in bulk ===
Florida has a 3-tier system requiring a producer, a wholesaler and a retailer. A franchise law designates who can market what alcoholic beverages where.

== Notable Florida political figures ==
- Donald Trump, 45th and 47th President of the United States (2017–2021; 2025–present)
- Ron DeSantis, 46th Governor of Florida (2019–present); U.S. Rep. for Florida's 6th district (2013–2018)
- Bill Nelson, 14th NASA administrator (2021-2025); U.S. Senator (2001-2019)
- Rick Scott, U.S. Senator (2019–present); 45th Governor of Florida (2011–2019)
- Ashley Moody, Senator (2025 – Present); 38th Florida Attorney General (2019 – 2025)
- Marco Rubio, 72nd United States Secretary of State (2025–present); Senator (2011–2025)
- Pam Bondi, 87th United States Attorney General (2025–2026); 37th Florida Attorney General (2011–2019)
- Mike Waltz, 32nd U.S. Ambassador to the United Nations (2025–present); 29th U.S. National Security Advisor (2025); U.S. Rep. for Florida's 6th district (2019–2025)
- Laurel Lee, U.S. Rep. for Florida's 15th district (2023–present); 30th Florida Secretary of State (2019–2023)
- Byron Donalds, U.S. Rep. for Florida's 19th district (2021–present)
- Susie Wiles, 32nd White House Chief of Staff (2025–present)
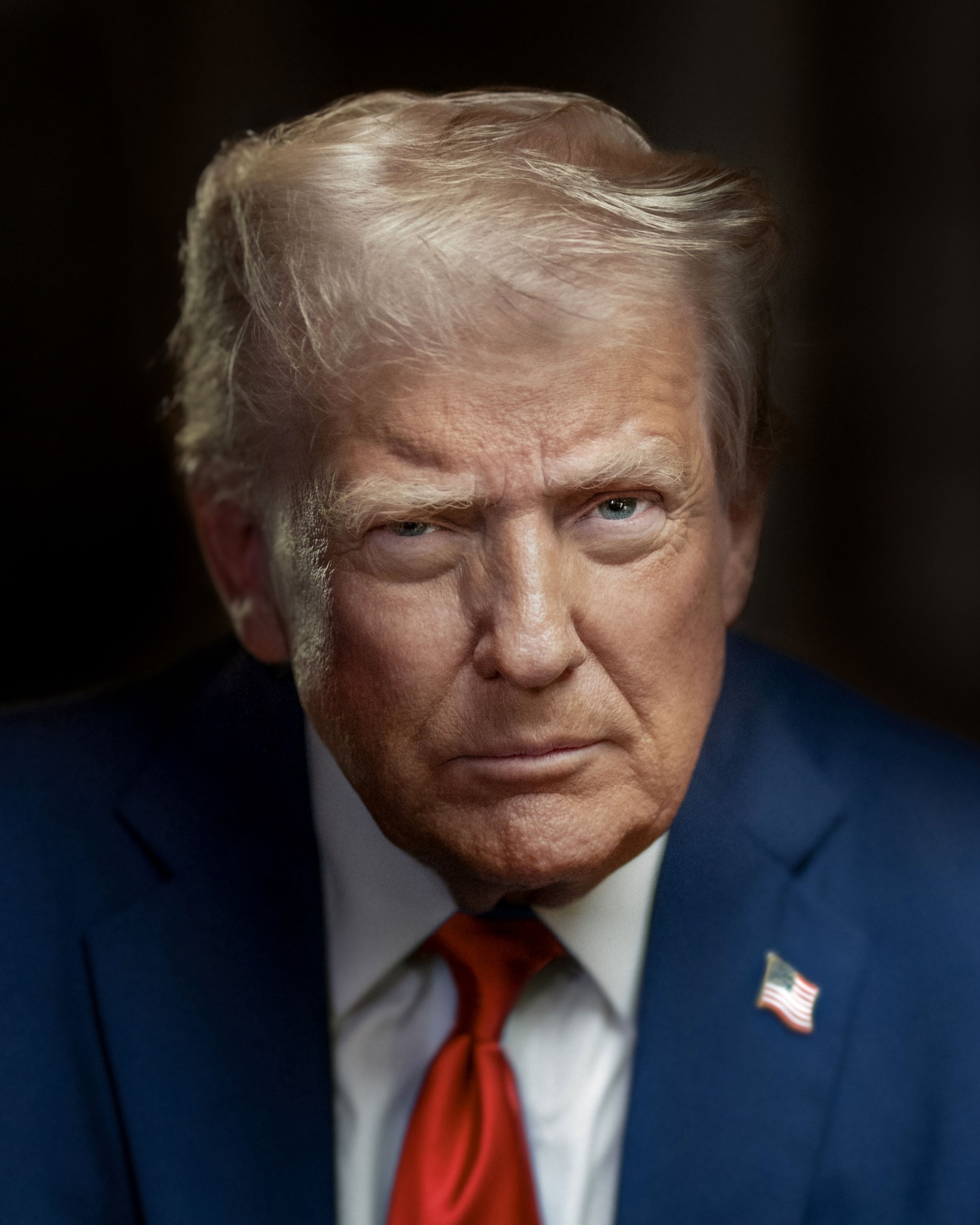
Donald Trump, President of the United States

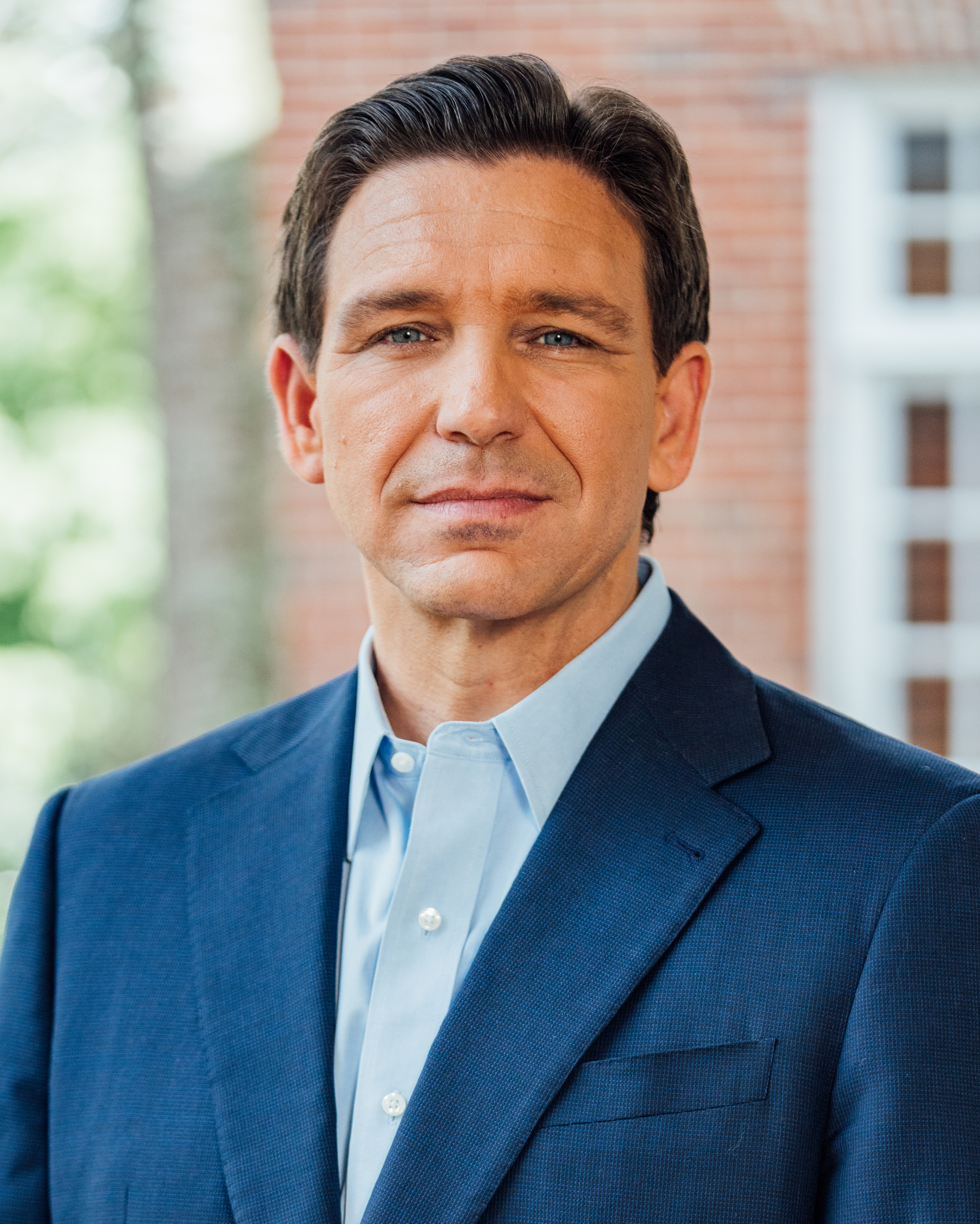
Ron DeSantis, Governor of Florida

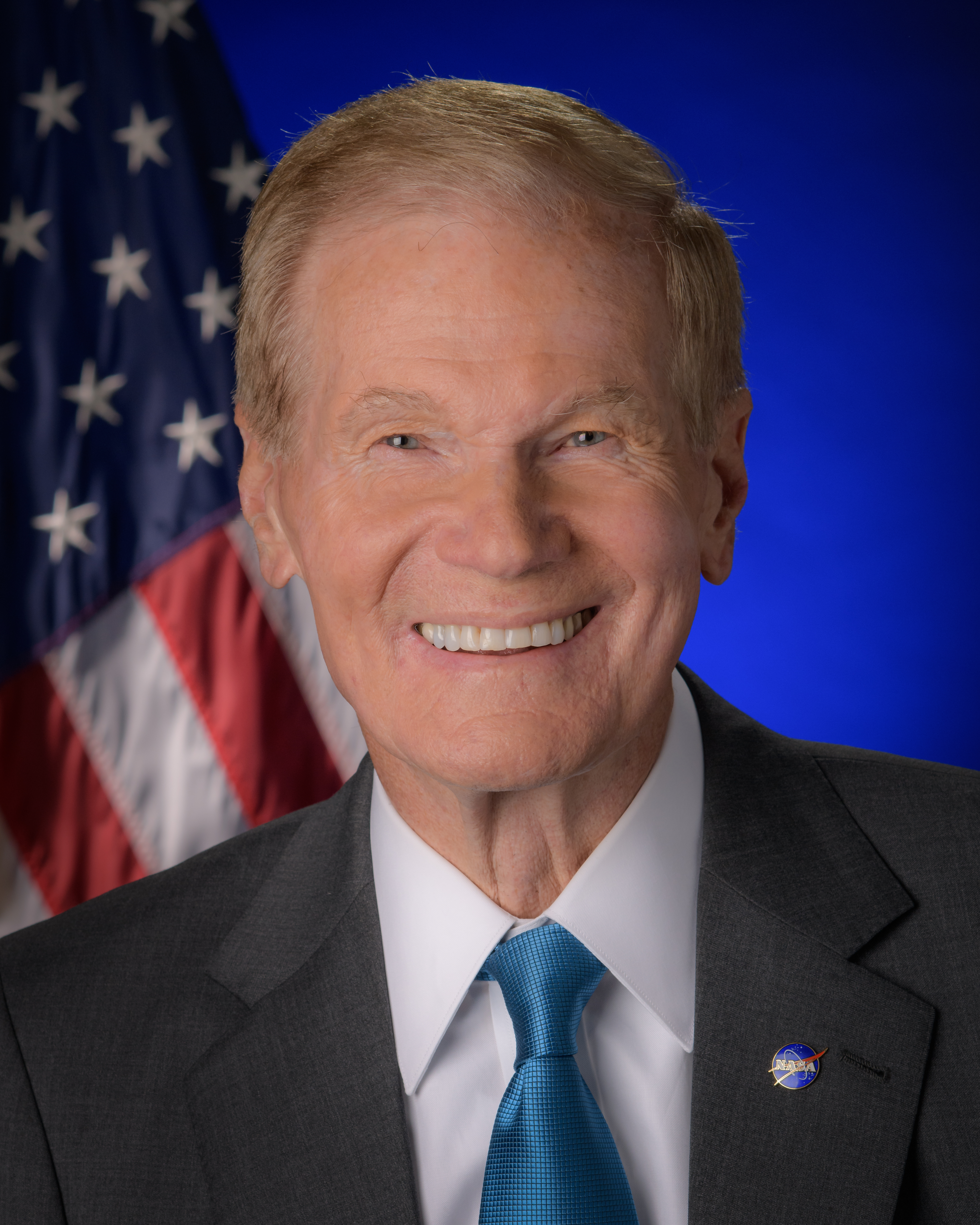
Bill Nelson, Senator from Florida (2001-2019)

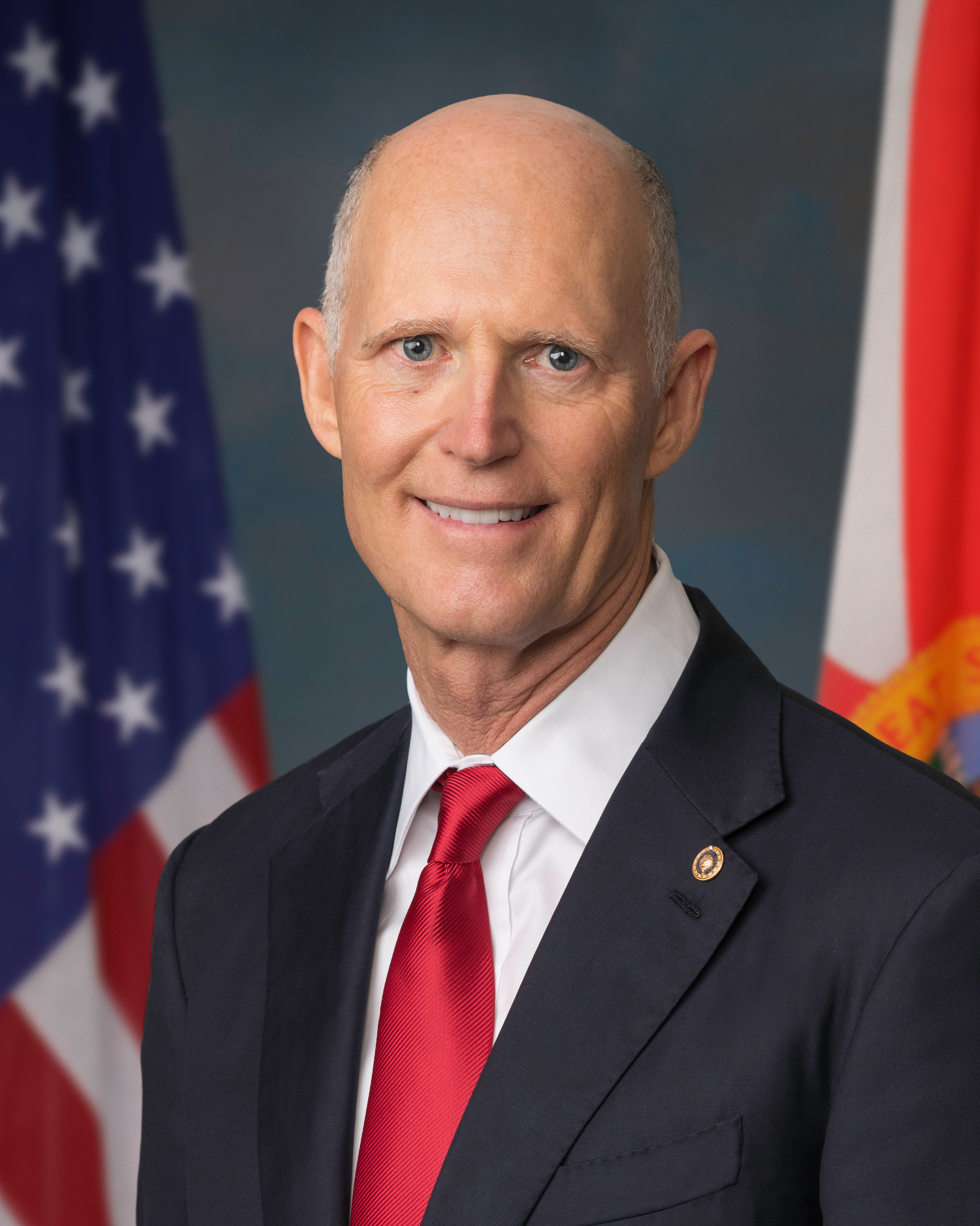
Rick Scott, Senior Senator from Florida

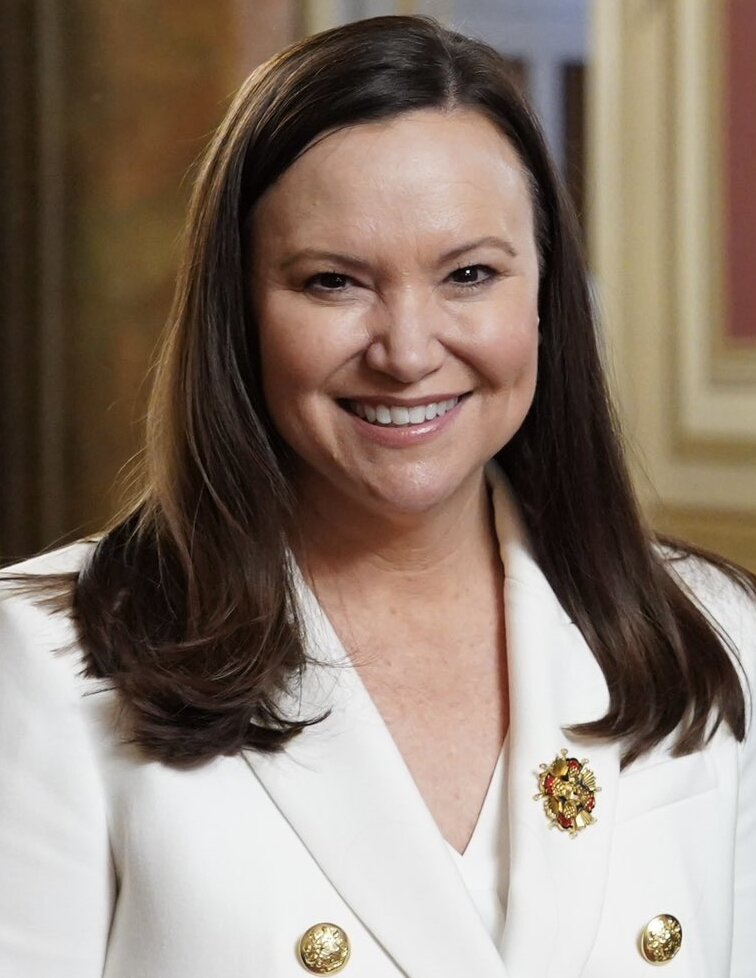
Ashley Moody, Junior Senator from Florida

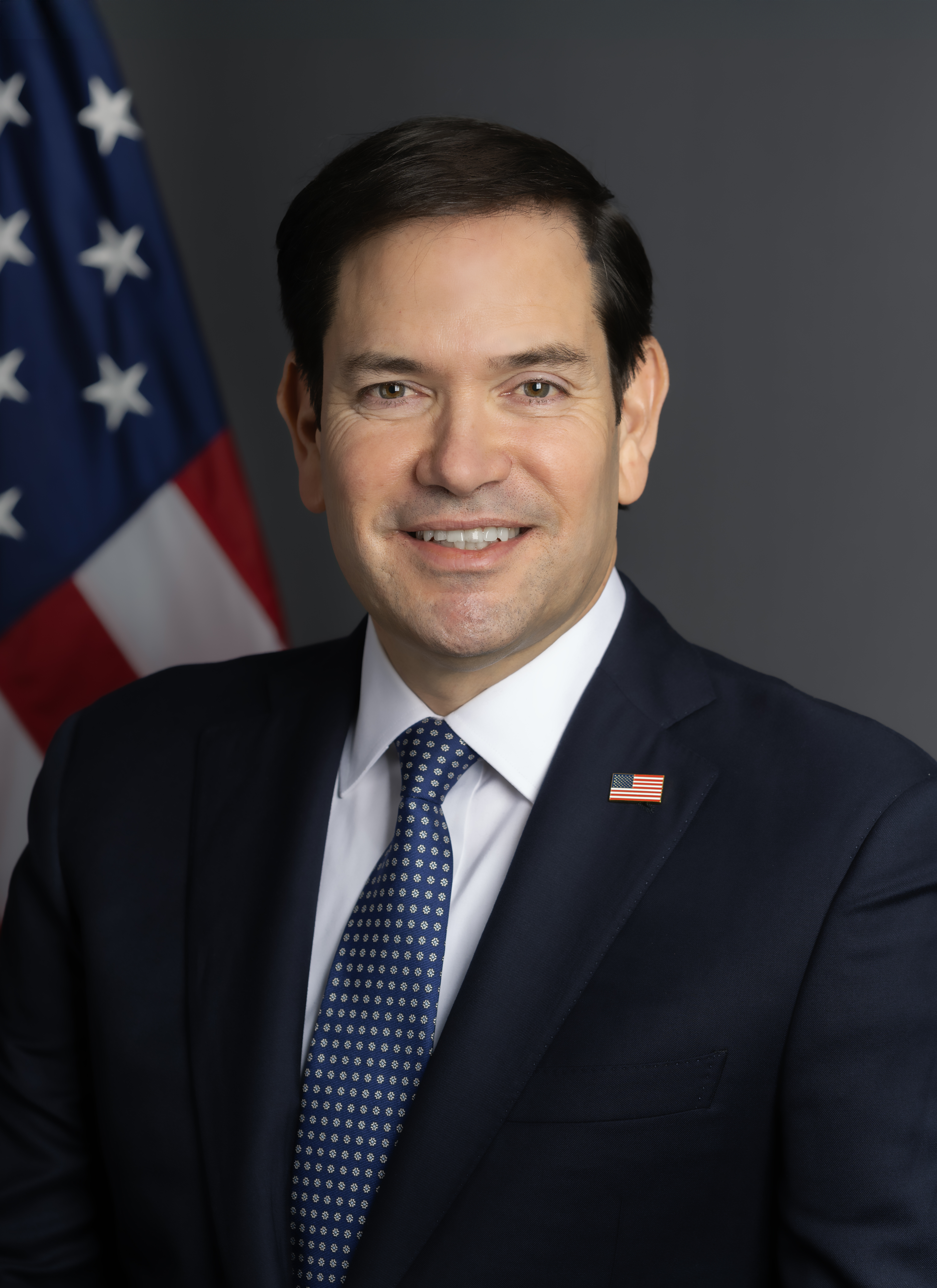
Marco Rubio, U.S. Secretary of State

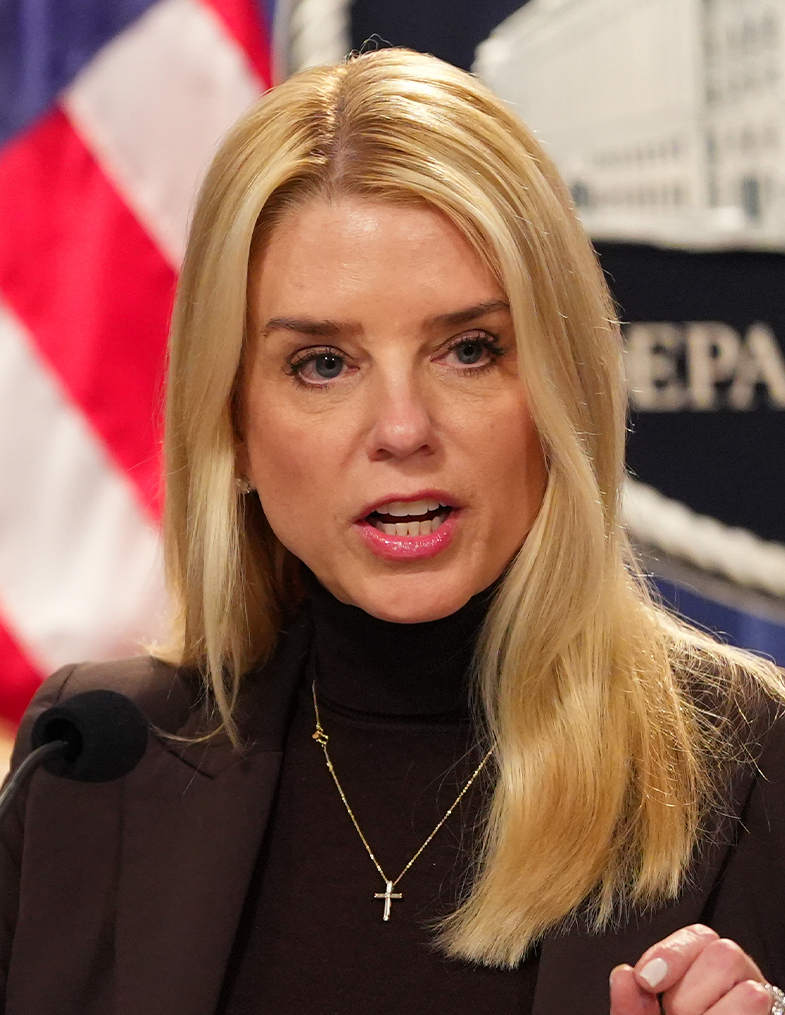
Pam Bondi, U.S. Attorney General

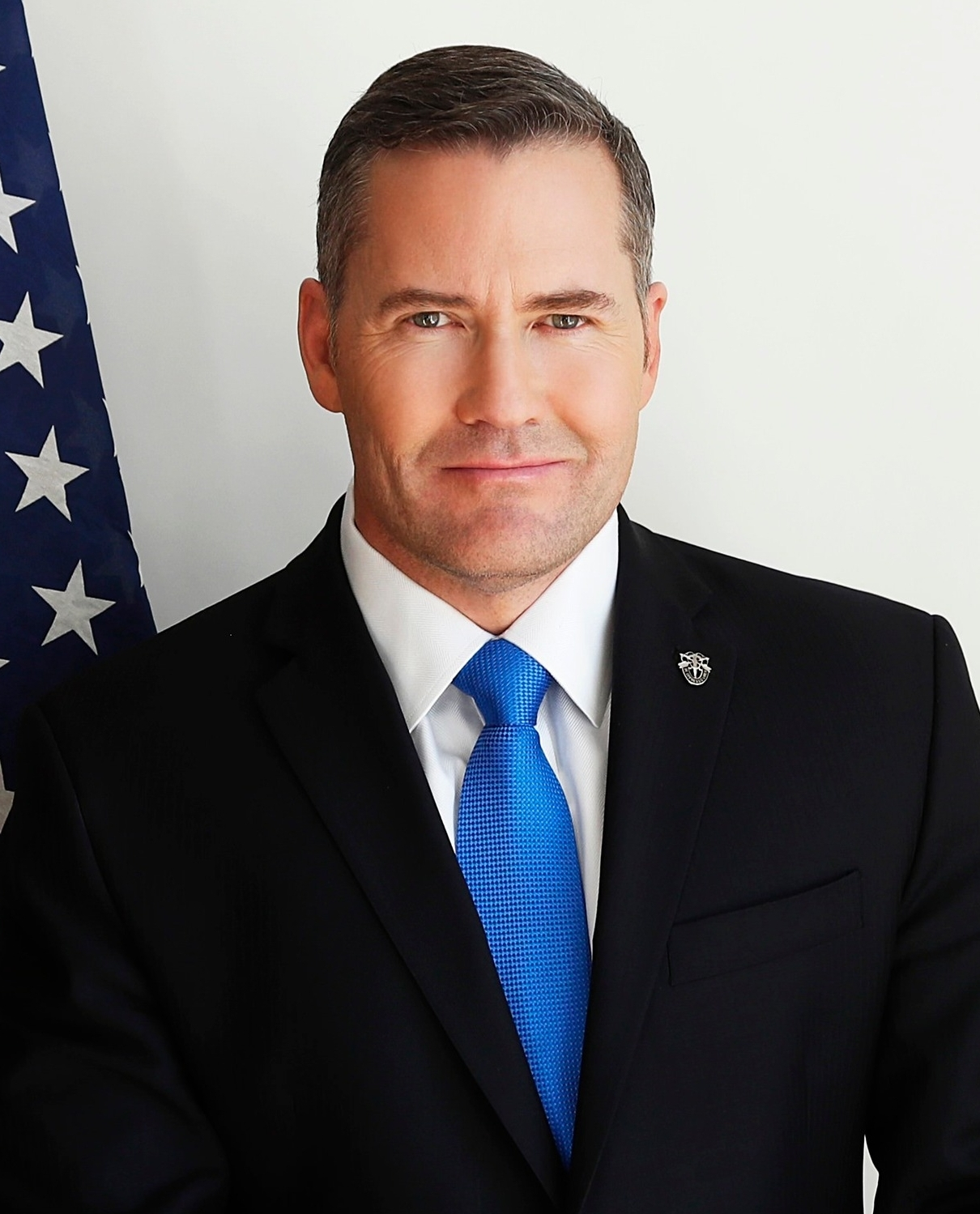
Mike Waltz, U.S. Ambassador to the United Nations

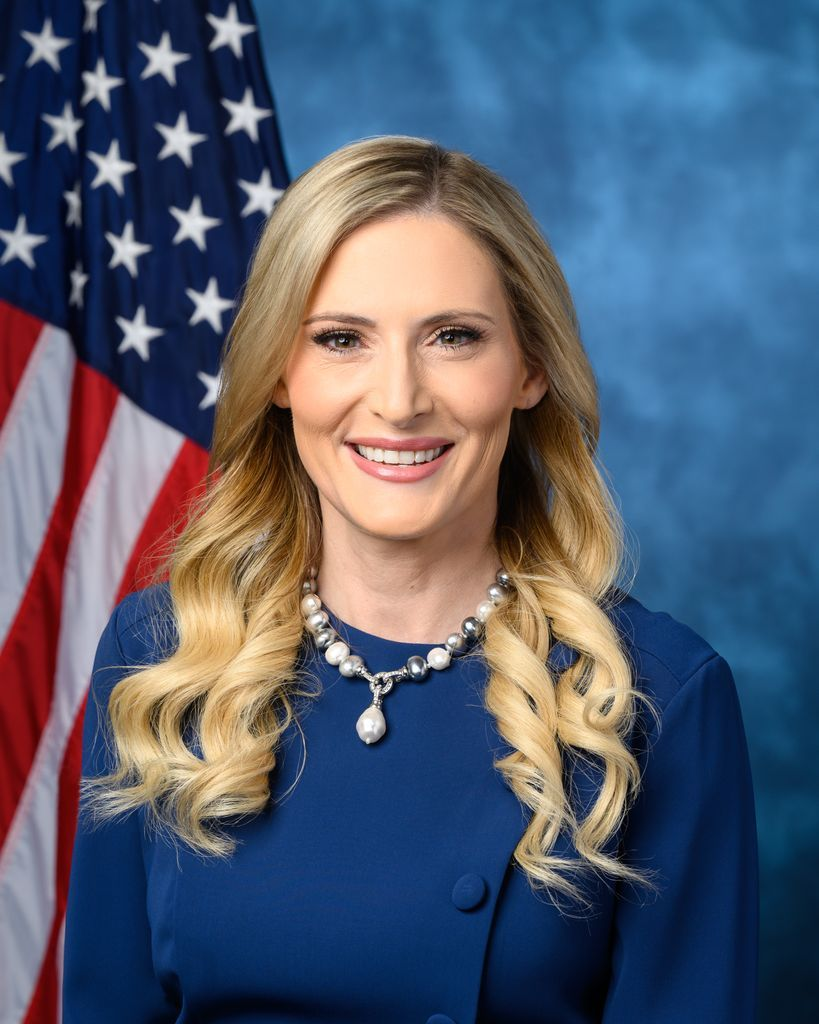
Laurel Lee, U.S. Rep. for Florida's 15th Congressional District

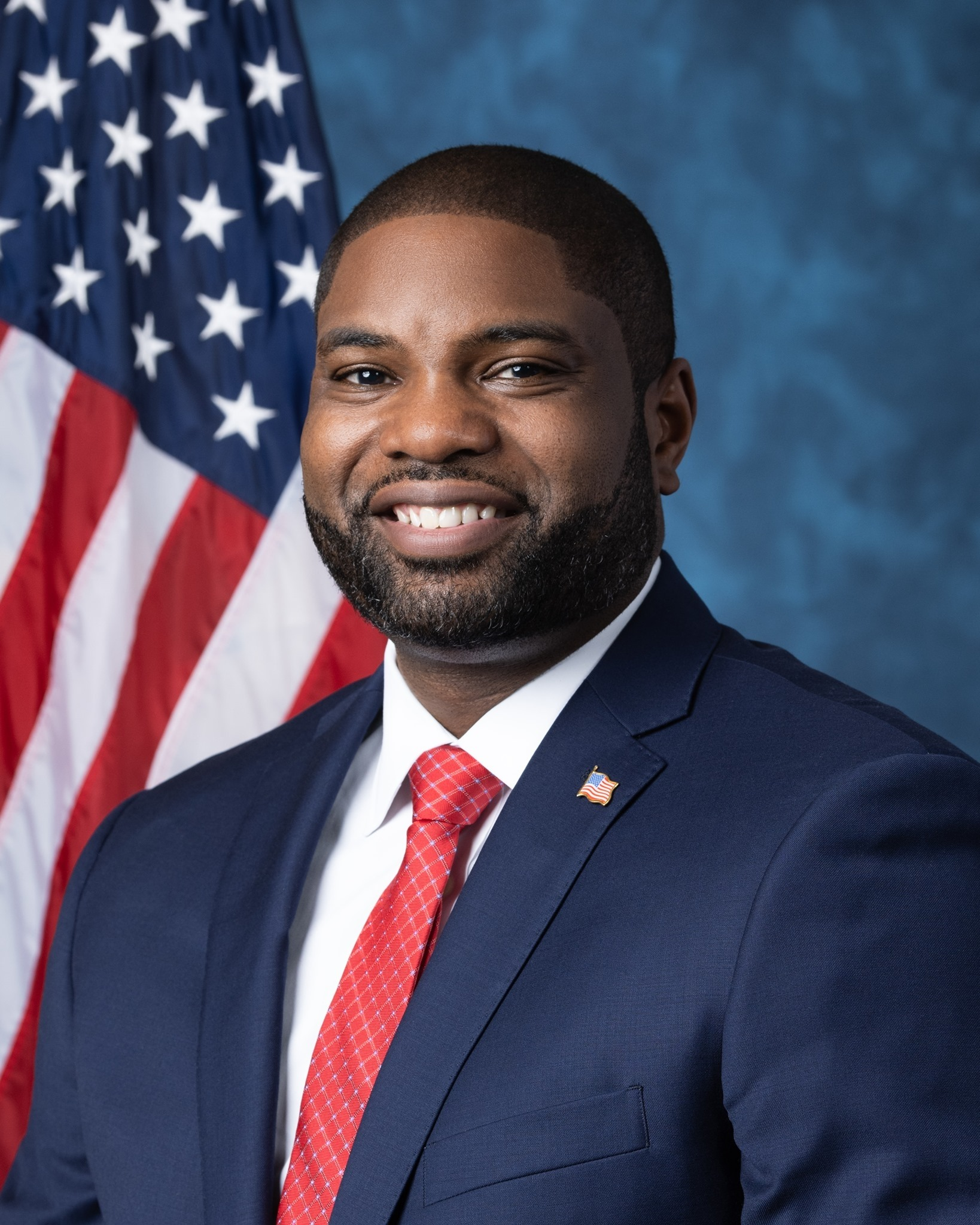
Byron Donalds, U.S. Rep. for Florida's 19th Congressional District

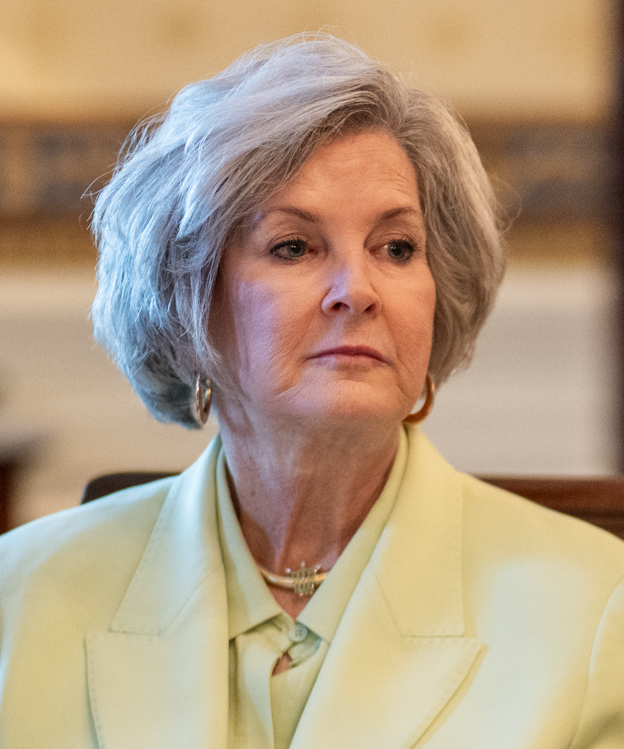
Susie Wiles, White House Chief of Staff

== Notable political media ==
Newspapers like the Miami Herald, Orlando Sentinel, and Tampa Bay Times cover the political landscape in Florida. The Tallahassee Democrat is known for its coverage of the Florida Legislature, in addition to statewide issues. There are also political blogs like Politico's "Florida Playbook" and Florida Politics, which are updated daily.

== See also ==
- Elections in Florida
- Florida Democratic Party
- Florida Student Association exercises constitutional and statutory powers
- Government of Florida
- Political party strength in Florida
- Republican Party of Florida
