= Florida Politics =

Political news website

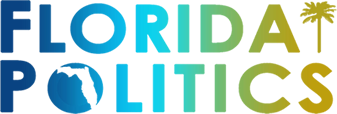
- Type: Online newspaper
- Publisher: Peter Schorsch
- Editor: Peter Schorsch
- Founded: 2013; 13 years ago
- Language: English
- Country: United States
- Website: floridapolitics.com

Florida Politics is a news website covering politics in the state of Florida. It is operated by publisher and editor Peter Schorsch, a registered Republican, who launched the site in 2013 and employs 17 freelance journalists. The site broke the news of the FBI search of Mar-a-Lago.

Schorsch authored the "St. Petersblog" before assembling investors to contribute $58,000 to buy the domain name FloridaPolitics.com. Under his leadership, Florida Politics' business model has been described as utilizing "pay to play," providing favorable news coverage in exchange for advertising dollars. Schorsch has denied this allegation, calling it "combination journalism." The site received money from Florida Power & Light via the company's lobbying firm, Matrix LLC. Describing Schorsch, Democratic strategist Eunic Epstein-Ortiz said in 2023, "He will determine whether or not something is news in the state of Florida."

Florida Politics also publishes Influence Magazine, which covers public affairs and lobbying in the state.
