= 2012 Florida House of Representatives election =

- November 6, 2012

120 seats of the Florida House of Representatives 61 seats needed for a majority
- Turnout: 39.66%
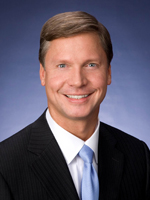

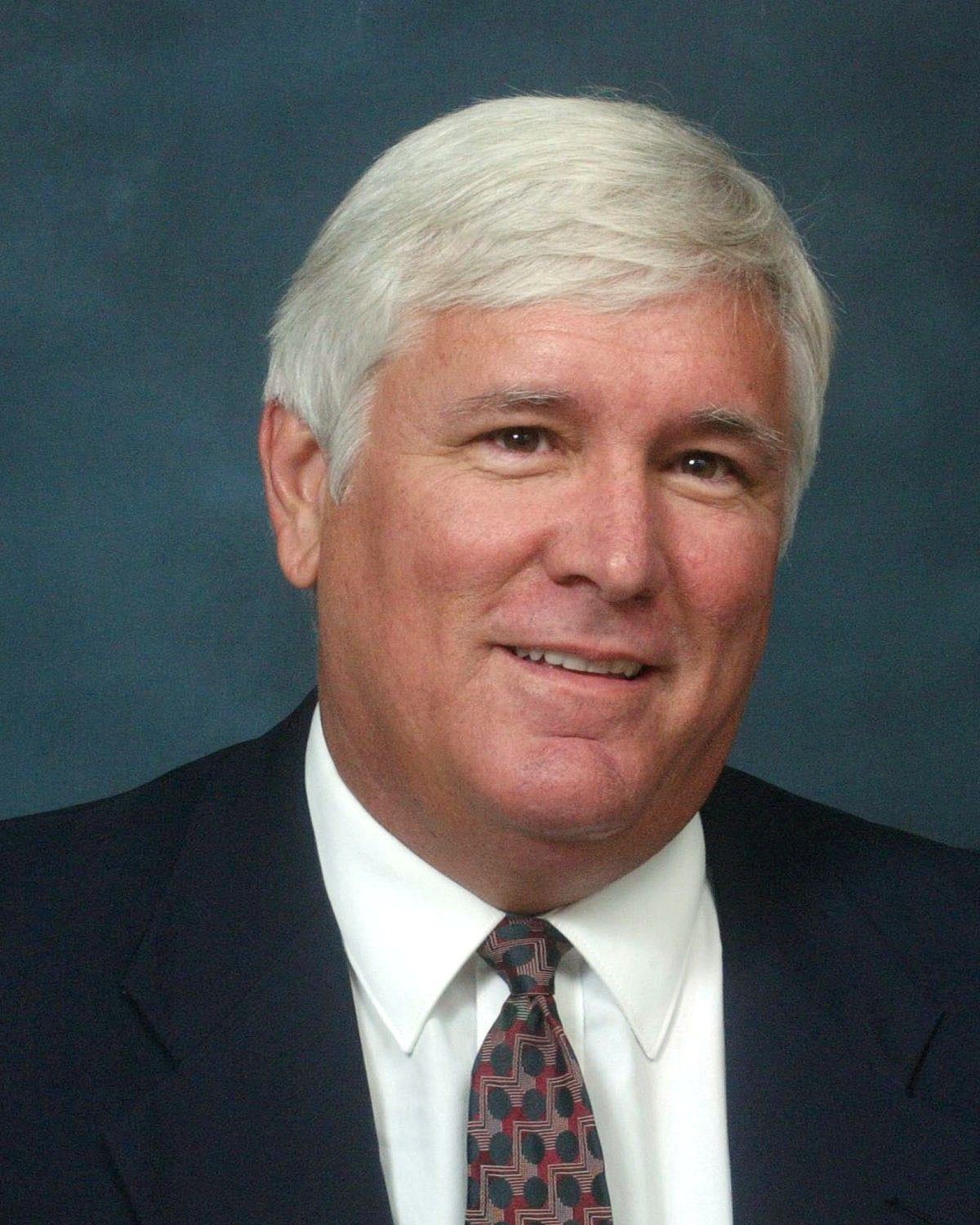
| | Majority party | Minority party |
|---|---|---|
| Leader | Dean Cannon (term limited) | Ron Saunders (retired) |
| Party | Republican | Democratic |
| Leader since | November 16, 2010 | November 16, 2010 |
| Leader's seat | 35th – Winter Park | 120th – Key West |
| Last election | 81 | 39 |
| Seats won | 76 | 44 |
| Seat change | ▼5 | ▲5 |
| Popular vote | 2,560,166 | 1,886,911 |
| Percentage | 54.08% | 39.86% |
- Results: Republican gain Democratic gain Republican hold Democratic hold
House Speaker before election
Dean Cannon
Republican
Elected House Speaker
Will Weatherford
Republican

The elections for the Florida House of Representatives was held on Tuesday, November 6, 2012 to elect all the 120 seats in the Florida House of Representatives. The day also coincided with the 2012 United States presidential election, 2012 United States House of Representatives elections, and 2012 United States Senate election in Florida. The result was gain of 8 seats by the Democrats while Republicans maintained their control of the State House.

The resulting victors of the election took their seats for the 115th session which began in 2013.

== Predictions ==
| Source | Ranking | As of |
|---|---|---|
| Governing | Likely R | October 24, 2012 |

== Results ==
| Party | Votes | | Seats | | |
| Party | No. | % | No. | +/− | % |
|---|---|---|---|---|---|
| Republican Party of Florida | 2,560,166 | 54.08 | 76 | -5 | 61.67 |
| Florida Democratic Party | 1,886,911 | 39.86 | 44 | +5 | 38.33 |
| Independent | 160,325 | 3.39 | 0 | 0 | 0.00 |
| Libertarian Party of Florida | 53,193 | 1.12 | 0 | 0 | 0.00 |
| Independent Party of Florida | 51,258 | 1.08 | 0 | 0 | 0.00 |
| Green Party of Florida | 20,496 | 0.43 | 0 | 0 | 0.00 |
| Write-in | 1,340 | 0.03 | 0 | 0 | 0.00 |
| Total | 4,733,689 | 100.00 | 120 | ±0 | 100.00 |
| Registered voters | 11,934,446 | 100.00 | | | |
| Turnout | 4,733,689 | 39.66 | | | |
Source: Florida Division of Elections

A Republican majority was secured, but was reduced from its prior supermajority by the electoral strengthening of the Democratic minority.

=== Complete list ===
| District | Incumbent | Party | First elected | 2012 status / Result | Candidates |
|---|---|---|---|---|---|
| 1 | Doug Broxson | Republican | 2010 | Redistricted to District 3 Republican hold | Clay Ingram (R) |
| 2 | Clay Ingram | Republican | 2007 | Redistricted to District 1 Republican hold | Clay Ford (R); Jeremy Bosso (R); Christine Bruha (i, Write-in) |
| 3 | Clay Ford | Republican | 2007 | Re-districted to District 2 Republican hold | Doug Broxson (R); Margaret Smith (i, Write-in); Gloria Wiggins (D, withdrawn) |
| 4 | Matt Gaetz | Republican | 2010 | Re-elected | Matt Gaetz (R) |
| 5 | Brad Drake | Republican | 2005 | Retired; Republican hold | Marti Coley (R); Eddy Holman (i); Travis Pitts (i) |
| 6 | Jimmy Patronis | Republican | 2006 | Re-elected | Jimmy Patronis (R) |
| 7 | Marti Coley | Republican | 2005 | Re-districted to District 5 | Halsey Beshears (R); Robert Hill (D) |
| 8 | Alan Williams | Democratic | 2008 | Re-elected | Alan Williams (D) |
| 9 | Michelle Rehwinkel Vasilinda | Democratic | 2008 | Re-elected | Michelle Rehwinkel Vasilinda (D); Bradley Maxwell (R) |
| 10 | Leonard Bembry | Democratic | 2008 | Redistricted; Republican gain | Elizabeth Porter (R) |
| 11 | Elizabeth Porter | Republican | 2010 | Redistricted to District 10; Republican hold | Janet Adkins (R); David Smith (D) |
| 12 | Janet Adkins | Republican | 2008 | Redistricted to District 11; Republican hold | Lake Ray (R); Karen Morian (D) |
| 13 | Daniel Davis | Republican | 2010 | Redistricted to District 15; Democratic gain | Reggie Fullwood (D) |
| 14 | Mia Jones | Democratic | 2008 | Re-elected; Democratic hold | Mia Jones (D); Jonathan Loesche (L) |
| 15 | Reggie Fullwood | Democratic | 2010 | Redistricted to District 13; Republican gain | Daniel Davis (R) |
| 16 | Charles McBurney | Republican | 2007 | Re-elected; Republican hold | Charles McBurney (R) |
| 17 | Lake Ray | Republican | 2008 | Redistricted to District 12; Republican hold | Ronald Renuart (R); Sue Sharp (i, write-in) |
| 18 | Ronald Renuart | Republican | 2008 | Redistricted to District 17; Republican hold | Travis Cummings (R) |
| 19 | Mike Weinstein | Republican | 2008 | Redistricted to District 12; Republican hold | Charles Van Zant (R) |
| 20 | William L. Proctor | Republican | 2008 | Redistricted to District ? Democratic gain | Clovis Watson Jr. (D) |
| 21 | Charles Van Zant | Republican | 2008 | Redistricted to District 19; Republican hold | Keith Perry (R); Andrew Morey (D) |
| 22 | Keith Perry | Republican | 2008 | Redistricted to District 21; Republican hold | Charlie Stone (R) |
| 23 | Charles Chestnut | Democratic | 2006 | Redistricted to District ? Republican gain | Dennis Baxley (R) |
| 24 | Dennis Baxley | Republican | 2010 | Redistricted to District 23; Republican hold | Travis Hutson (R); Milissa Holland (D); Michael Cornish (i) |
| 25 | Larry Metz | Republican | 2010 | Redistricted to District 32; Republican hold | Dave Hood (R); Kristina Spencer-Kephart (D) |
| 26 | Fred Costello | Republican | 2010 | Retired; Democratic gain | Dwayne Taylor (D) |
| 27 | Dwayne Taylor | Democratic | 2008 | Redistricted to District 26; Republican gain | David Santiago (R); Phil Giorno (D) |
| 28 | Dorothy Hukill | Republican | 2004 | Retired; Republican hold | Jason Brodeur (R); Franklin Perez (L) |
| 29 | Tom Goodson | Republican | 2010 | Redistricted to District 50; Republican hold | Mike Clelland (D); Chris Dorworth (R) |
| 30 | Ritch Workman | Republican | 2008 | Redistricted to District 52; Republican hold | Karen Castor Dentel (D); Scott Plakon (R) |
| 31 | | | | | |
| 32 | | | | | |
| 33 | | | | | |
| 34 | | | | | |
| 35 | | | | | |
| 36 | | | | | |
| 37 | | | | | |
| 38 | | | | | |
| 39 | | | | | |
| 40 | | | | | |
| 41 | | | | | |
| 42 | Eileen Game | Democratic | 2012 | Democratic Gain from Republican | Eileen Game (D) |
| 43 | | | | | |
| 44 | | | | | |
| 45 | | | | | |
| 46 | | | | | |
| 47 | | | | | |
| 48 | | | | | |
| 49 | Darren Soto | Democratic | 2007 | Democratic hold | Joe Saunders (D); Marco Peña (R) |
| 50 | | | | | |
| 51 | | | | | |
| 52 | | | | | |
| 53 | | | | | |
| 54 | | | | | |
| 55 | | | | | |
| 56 | | | | | |
| 57 | | | | | |
| 58 | | | | | |
| 59 | | | | | |
| 60 | | | | | |
| 61 | | | | | |
| 62 | | | | | |
| 63 | | | | | |
| 64 | | | | | |
| 65 | | | | | |
| 66 | | | | | |
| 67 | | | | | |
| 68 | | | | | |
| 69 | | | | | |
| 70 | | | | | |
| 71 | | | | | |
| 72 | | | | | |
| 73 | | | | | |
| 74 | | | | | |
| 75 | | | | | |
| 76 | | | | | |
| 77 | | | | | |
| 78 | | | | | |
| 79 | | | | | |
| 80 | | | | | |
| 81 | | | | | |
| 82 | | | | | |
| 83 | | | | | |
| 84 | | | | | |
| 85 | | | | | |
| 86 | | | | | |
| 87 | | | | | |
| 88 | | | | | |
| 89 | | | | | |
| 90 | | | | | |
| 91 | | | | | |
| 92 | | | | | |
| 93 | | | | | |
| 94 | | | | | |
| 95 | | | | | |
| 96 | | | | | |
| 97 | | | | | |
| 98 | | | | | |
| 99 | | | | | |
| 100 | | | | | |
| 101 | | | | | |
| 102 | | | | | |
| 103 | | | | | |
| 104 | | | | | |
| 105 | | | | | |
| 106 | | | | | |
| 107 | | | | | |
| 108 | | | | | |
| 109 | | | | | |
| 110 | | | | | |
| 111 | | | | | |
| 112 | | | | | |
| 113 | None (previous incumbent Richard L. Steinberg resigned Feb. 2012) | Democratic | vacant | Democratic hold | David Richardson (D) |
| 114 | | | | | |
| 115 | | | | | |
| 116 | | | | | |
| 117 | | | | | |
| 118 | | | | | |
| 119 | | | | | |
| 120 | | | | | |
