= Holly Merrill Raschein =

American politician (born 1980)

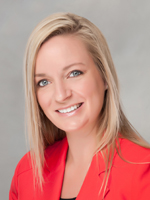

Member of the Florida House of Representatives from the 120th district
- In office November 6, 2012 – November 3, 2020
- Preceded by: Ron Saunders
- Succeeded by: Jim Mooney

Personal details
- Born: December 16, 1980 (age 45) Anchorage, Alaska
- Party: Republican
- Education: Florida State University (B.S.)
- Profession: Consultant

Holly Merrill Raschein (born December 16, 1980) is an American politician from Florida. A Republican, she served in the Florida House of Representatives from 2012 to 2020, representing the 120th District in Monroe County and southern Miami-Dade County.

== History ==
Raschein was born in Anchorage, Alaska, and moved to the state of Florida in 1999 when she started at Florida State University. She graduated with a degree in political science in 2003. During her time as an undergraduate, she began working at Robert M. Levy & Associates, a state government relations firm in Tallahassee. After her graduation, Raschein began working as a legislative aide for Republican State Representative Ken Sorensen. When Sorensen was unable to seek another term in the Legislature in 2006 and Democratic Rep. Ron Saunders was elected to replace him, Raschein continued working in the office, despite the fact that Saunders was a Democrat.

== Florida House of Representatives ==
In 2012, following the reconfiguration of the State's Legislative Districts and following Saunders's decision to run for the Florida Senate rather than seek re-election, an open seat occurred in the reformatted 120th District. Raschein opted to run for the seat, and faced Former Key West Mayor Morgan McPherson, the 2010 Nominee, in the Republican Primary. She was able to defeat Mayor McPherson comfortably, winning 66% of the vote to his 34%, and advanced to the General Election, where she faced Ian Whitney, the Democratic Nominee. Over the course of the campaign, the two candidates staked out positions in opposition to each other. Raschein supported private school vouchers while Whitney did not; Whitney supported the expansion of Medicaid under the Patient Protection and Affordable Care Act while Raschein opposed it, noting, "I am all for health care. But I don't know how the states are going to be able to pay for the expansion of Medicaid. The devil is in the details. How are we going to pay for that? We don't want to cut education anymore, social services can't be cut anymore. I am concerned about how we are going to fund it." Despite the competitive nature of the election, Raschein and Whitney maintained mutual respect and kindness for each other, with Whitney noting that the two of them got along "very well" and Raschein calling her opponent "a very nice guy." Ultimately, Raschein narrowly defeated Whitney, winning her first term with 52% of the vote to his 48%. In doing so, Raschein followed in the footsteps of her great-grandfather Hartley Hendrick Hethcox, who served in the Florida House of Representatives in the 1940s and was a County Commissioner in Lake County.

During the 2013 legislative session, Raschein sponsored legislation that aimed to protect stray cats, creating "protected cat colonies where the glut of strays scavenging for food and shelter could be trapped, neutered or spayed, then released to fend for themselves." She also worked with Democratic Representative Joe Saunders to author legislation that "adds sexual orientation and 'gender identity' to the list of characteristics against which private businesses cannot discriminate in the provision of employment or services."

In the 2014 legislative session, Raschein worked to renew funding for a "state tax incentive program that entices film and television productions," which benefitted several television series filming in the Florida Keys, but the legislative session ran out before the bill could be considered. She noted, "There were a lot of differing opinions [in the legislature] on how we as a state should support the film and television industry. It kind of got held up in the process. It wasn't a priority and that's unfortunate." She also worked with the Florida Fish and Wildlife Conservation Commission and State Senator Greg Evers to author legislation that banned the importation of lionfish into the state, as the fish is an invasive species that has a detrimental effect on local ecosystems.

In 2014, Raschein was re-elected to her second term in the legislature without opposition, and in 2016, she won again with 57.3% of the vote.

Raschein was term-limited from the House in 2020, after serving four terms.
