= Carlos Smith (politician) =

American politician (born 1980)

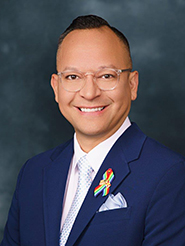

Member of the Florida Senate from the 17th district
- Incumbent
- Assumed office November 5, 2024
- Preceded by: Linda Stewart

Member of the Florida House of Representatives from the 49th district
- In office November 8, 2016 – November 8, 2022
- Preceded by: Rene Plasencia
- Succeeded by: Susan Plasencia (redistricting)

Personal details
- Born: Carlos Guillermo Smith; December 31, 1980 (age 45) Fort Lauderdale, Florida, U.S.
- Party: Democratic
- Spouse: Jerick Mediavilla (m. 2019)
- Education: University of Central Florida (BA)

Carlos Guillermo Smith (born December 31, 1980) is an American lobbyist and politician who has been a member of the Florida Senate from the 17th district since 2024, covering much of Orange County east of I-4. A member of the Democratic Party, he served in the Florida House of Representatives from 2016 to 2022.

A native of Fort Lauderdale, Smith is the first openly LGBTQ+ Latino elected to the Florida Legislature.

== Early life ==
Smith was born in Florida to parents who immigrated to South Florida from Canada in 1979. His mother being from Canada, and father from Peru, Smith was the first member of his family to be born in the United States.

Smith attended Spanish River High School in Boca Raton, FL, where he graduated in 1999. In 2003, he graduated from the University of Central Florida with a degree in business administration. Following graduation, he worked for eight years and became manager of Men's Wearhouse stores in Florida and Georgia.

== Early political career ==
In 2011, Smith was hired as a legislative aide for Florida House Representative Scott Randolph. He then served as communications director and senior advisor to Joe Saunders during his successful 2012 bid for the Florida House of Representatives in the 49th district. From 2012 to 2014, Smith served as Saunders' policy chief and ran his legislative office. In 2013, he was elected chairman of the Orange County Democratic Party. He resigned his chairmanship of the Orange County Democratic Party in the summer of 2015 to focus on his bid for the seat Randolph and Saunders had held before him.

=== Equality Florida ===
Smith was employed by political advocacy group Equality Florida as its governmental affairs manager from January 2015-November 2016. While holding the position, he worked on behalf of Equality Florida at the Florida Capitol to compromise with Republican lawmakers on the issue of the controversial HB 43, also known as the Pastor Protection Act, which reinforces that churches and religious clergy can legally refuse to participate in same-sex marriages. Smith secured a success for Equality Florida by reaching agreement with Republican lawmakers that the law would not be expanded to allow private businesses to refuse service to members of the LGBT community, essentially neutralizing the bill. Smith has also advocated on behalf of Equality Florida for the passage of a non-discrimination bill in Florida to protect LGBT individuals in areas of housing, employment, and public accommodations.

=== 2016 Florida House of Representatives campaign ===
On June 1, 2015, Smith announced his candidacy for the 49th district seat in the Florida House of Representatives. He ran to take back the seat for Democrats from Republican representative Rene Plasencia. Plasencia, who had won the district in an upset over Joe Saunders in 2014, chose to run in the neighboring 50th district, which leans more Republican. On May 3, Smith officially qualified to be on the ballot by collecting the required number of petitions. At one point, Smith faced two opponents for the seat: Republican candidate Amber Mariano and a no party affiliation candidate, Shea Silverman. Shortly before the qualifying deadline, however, Mariano moved her campaign to the 36th district, leaving Smith without a Republican opponent. Mariano went on to win election in her new district.

Over the course of his 2016 campaign, Smith received endorsements from prominent progressive politicians, organizations, and unions, including Minnesota Congressman Keith Ellison, Orlando Mayor Buddy Dyer, former Florida House Representative Joe Saunders, St. Petersburg Mayor Rick Kriseman, and the Florida Professional Firefighters State Association.

During the campaign, Smith gained national media attention for his advocacy concerning the 2016 Orlando nightclub shooting, which occurred during Latin Night at Pulse Nightclub. Smith, who had attended the club in the past, felt personally shocked and targeted by the attack, the victims of which were mostly Latino and LGBT. He helped to organize vigils in the wake of the tragedy and spoke to media as part of his position with Equality Florida. For his work, he was included in Out Magazine's Out 100 as one of the "Survivors and Heroes of Pulse."

Despite lacking a Republican opponent, Smith raised more than $150,000 for his campaign and went on to defeat Silverman with 69 percent of the vote.

Smith supported Senator Bernie Sanders in his 2016 presidential campaign.

== Florida House of Representatives ==
On November 22, 2016, Smith was sworn in as a member of the Florida House of Representatives, becoming the first openly gay Latin person and first openly LGBT Latin person elected to the Florida Legislature. Despite being part of a small Democratic minority in the House, Smith filed several ambitious pieces of legislation and has advocated aggressively on a series of progressive issues.

On April 21, 2022, Smith attempted to stage a sit-in demonstration to prevent a vote on Florida's congressional district maps. Opponents of the tactic compared his actions to an insurrection. The demonstration was ultimately unsuccessful.

=== Elections ===
In 2016, Smith first won election to the seat with 69 percent of the vote, defeating no party affiliation candidate Shea Silverman, who garnered 31 percent. Smith had no Republican opponent.

In his 2018 re-election campaign, Smith received 64 percent of the vote, beating Republican challenger Ben Griffin by an almost 2-to-1 margin.

Following changes to his Florida House district during the 2020 United States redistricting cycle and low voter turnout among Florida's Democratic voters, Smith lost his re-election bid to Republican Susan Plasencia in the 2022 Florida House of Representatives election.

=== Legislative Progressive Caucus ===
In April 2017, Smith formed and was subsequently elected chair of the Florida Legislative Progressive Caucus. Modeled on the Congressional Progressive Caucus, the group aims to serve as a voice for the progressive left in Tallahassee and advocate for social and economic justice, civil rights, and environmental protection.

=== Issues ===
==== Gun control ====
For the 2017 legislative session, Smith filed a bill to ban the sale, transfer, and possession of assault weapons (a largely undefined weapon) and large-capacity magazines. Largely motivated by the 2016 Orlando nightclub shooting, Smith has advocated fiercely for the restrictions, arguing at a January 2017 press conference that "the people killed by gun violence every day have rights too. The families and victims who will never be made whole have rights. They were stolen from them by a person armed with hate and with these weapons. So long as criminals and madmen have access to these guns, we are not safe. The time for talk is over." The bill died in committee without receiving a hearing.

Smith refiled his assault weapons ban for the 2018 legislative session just days after the 2017 Las Vegas shooting, in which a lone gunman killed 58 people and caused 851 injuries.

After the Stoneman Douglas High School shooting in February 2018, Smith renewed his advocacy to enact a ban on assault weapons and high capacity magazines. On February 20, less than a week after the massacre that killed 14 high school students and three teachers, Florida Representative Kionne McGhee moved to withdraw Smith's bill that would ban assault weapons from its committees and immediately consider it on the floor. The motion failed, 36–71, along party lines. Students from Marjory Stoneman Douglas High School watched the motion fail from the House chamber's viewing gallery.

Later that day, Smith pointedly questioned Representative Ross Spano on the floor regarding Spano's resolution declaring pornography a "health risk." In an attempt to question Spano's priorities, Smith asked Spano if pornography had ever physically handicapped a person, or if it had caused PTSD in first responders. Smith asked, "Do you believe that identifying porn as a public health risk is more important than identifying gun violence as a public health risk, especially after the events of this week and the events of June 12, 2016, when 49 people were murdered by gun violence at Pulse?" Spano is the chair of the Criminal Justice Subcommittee in the Florida House of Representatives, the first committee to which Smith's assault weapons ban was assigned. Spano had the power to schedule the bill for a hearing in his committee during the 2017 and 2018 lawmaking sessions, but declined to do so.

On February 21, Smith spoke at a gun control rally of more than 3,000 people at the Florida Capitol. More than 100 students from Stoneman Douglas attended the event. Smith said of the 17 Parkland victims, "They may have lost their voices, but you haven't lost yours. You are their voices now, and we're going to work together to make sure this never happens again."

Smith criticized school safety plans proposed by Florida Governor Rick Scott and Republican legislative leadership to address the shooting, accusing them of trying to "reinvest in the same system that failed them at every single level ... what we need to be focusing on is gun safety. That is absolutely the issue." Smith attempted to amend the House school safety plan to include his assault weapons ban, but the Republican majority rejected his amendment. Smith would eventually vote against the Republican school safety bill, claiming that it did not go far enough. He also cited concerns over provisions in the bill that would allow Florida counties to arm certain school personnel, which he called "toxic." After an eight-hour debate, the bill passed the House 67–50. Although most Republican House members supported the legislation, enough opposed it that the House could not have approved the proposal without the support of at least one Democrat. Ten Democrats, many of them representing areas of Broward County and South Florida near Parkland, supported the legislation, giving Republican leadership the votes they needed to pass the plan. On March 9, Florida Governor Rick Scott signed the Marjory Stoneman Douglas High School Public Safety Act into law.

==== Education ====
In 2017 and 2018, Smith proposed an overhaul to the Florida Bright Futures Scholarship Program, saying that "we have seen enough cuts to education in this legislature. The time is now to reinvest and expand the Bright Futures scholarship to make good on Florida’s commitment to affordable college for everyone.” In 2008, Bright Futures provided scholarships to 39% of Florida high school graduates. By 2015, it covered only 20%. Smith's legislation, titled the "Restore Our Bright Futures Act," proposed the following changes:

- Expansion of the top tier of the scholarship, the Academic Scholars award, to cover 100% of tuition
- Expansion of the second tier of the scholarship, the Medallion Scholars award, to cover 75% of tuition
- A $200 to $300 stipend for textbooks
- Allowing the scholarship to be used for summer enrollment
- Lowering standardized testing cutoffs to expand access to the scholarship

Although Smith's bill did not pass during the 2017 session, several provisions from it were included in the 2017–2018 budget. For the 2018 legislative session, Senate Bill 4 - which would permanently write most of Smith's proposed changes into statute - is one of Senate President Joe Negron's top priorities.

==== Cannabis ====
Smith has been an outspoken advocate for the medical and recreational use of cannabis. He supported Amendment 2, a proposed constitutional amendment to legalize medical marijuana, in 2016. The initiative passed overwhelmingly, forcing the Florida Legislature to implement the constitutional changes. Smith spoke out against the implementing legislation favored by Republicans, which banned smokeable cannabis and instead limited its use to oils and vape pens. Smith asked pointedly on the House floor, "Who are we to tell legitimate patients that they can't smoke their cannabis? That's not our business, members. It's not our business to infringe upon their personal freedoms. It's not our business to infringe on the sacred patient-doctor relationship."

In 2017 and 2018, Smith introduced a bill to decriminalize marijuana, making personal-use possession a civil offense rather than a criminal offense, taking jail time off the table for marijuana possession. The Senate version of Smith's bill was heard in committee in 2017, but made no further headway. "It's time for Florida to stop arresting 39,706 Floridians a year just for smoking weed," Smith said in a 2018 tweet.

Though the Sunshine State legalized medical marijuana in 2016 through a ballot measure, lawmakers passed legislation in 2017 outlawing smokable forms of the substance. DeSantis and other officials allege that the ban contradicts voters' wishes. “Over 70 percent of Florida voters approved medical marijuana in 2016,” said Governor Ron DeSantis. “I thank my colleagues in the Legislature for working with me to ensure the will of the voters is upheld. Now that we have honored our duty to find a legislative solution, I have honored my commitment and filed a joint motion to dismiss the state’s appeal and to vacate the lower court decision which had held the prior law to be unconstitutional.” Smokable marijuana is now legal in Florida with a medical marijuana recommendation.

==== Immigration ====
Smith has advocated for protections for undocumented immigrants, including the Florida Trust Act, which he has sponsored in the 2017 and 2018 legislative sessions. This bill would bar law enforcement officers in Florida from complying with detainer requests from U.S. Immigration and Customs Enforcement, making it harder for federal immigration authorities to deport undocumented immigrants living in Florida.

Smith has also vocally opposed immigration legislation introduced by House Republicans that would essentially do the opposite by requiring law enforcement to comply with immigration officials.

In a January 2018 TV advertisement, Speaker of the Florida House Richard Corcoran illicitly criticized Smith for introducing the Trust Act, saying, "incredibly, some Tallahassee politicians want to make Florida a sanctuary state." Corcoran mentioned Smith's bill several times during a February 13 immigration debate with Tallahassee mayor and Democratic gubernatorial candidate Andrew Gillum, prodding Gillum as to whether or not he supported the legislation. The Sun-Sentinel named Smith the winner of the debate due to the frequent discussion of his proposed policy.

==== Animal rights ====
Smith has fought to improve conditions for racing greyhounds in Florida, filing legislation in 2017 to ban the use of anabolic steroids in the industry. Florida is one of the few places in the United States where greyhound racing persists, and the use of steroids in racing dogs has caused adverse effects such as increased aggression and the development of male sex organs in female dogs. Smith's bill passed the House overwhelmingly, but failed in the Senate. Smith has re-filed the bill for the 2018 session.

==== Healthcare ====
In 2017, Smith secured $2.5 million in funding for UCF RESTORES, a PTSD clinic located on the campus of the University of Central Florida. The center provides virtual reality immersion therapy to help veterans and first responders with PTSD to overcome the disorder. Smith is seeking another $2 million for the clinic in 2018.

For the 2018 session, Smith co-sponsored a bill that would create a statewide single-payer health insurance program in Florida.

In February 2018, after learning that health insurance provided to employees by Florida-based supermarket Publix didn't cover PrEP HIV prevention medication, Smith met with Publix officials to express his concerns. The next day, Publix reversed the policy and announced the inclusion of the treatment in its employee health insurance. Smith proclaimed the decision as a "huge victory" for the LGBT community. "I think they know and understand that this is the right thing to do for their employees," Smith said.

=== Committee assignments ===
- Government Accountability Committee
- Higher Education Appropriations Committee
- Joint Select Committee on Collective Bargaining
- Local, Federal & Veterans Affairs Subcommittee
- Post-Secondary Education Subcommittee

== Awards ==
- Elizabeth Taylor Legislative Leadership Award 2018
- Orlando Diversity Awards - "Champion of Equality," 2018
- American Society for the Prevention of Cruelty to Animals (ASPCA), Leadership and Commitment to Animal Welfare Award, 2017
- Florida Association of Counties (FAC), County Champion Award, 2017
- Council on American-Islamic Relations (CAIR Florida), Bravery and Fighting for Justice Award, 2017
- Democratic Women's Club of Florida, Inc., Legislative Advocacy Award, 2017
- Florida Education Association (FEA), Freshman Legislator Friend of Public Education Award, 2017
- Florida Young Democrats, Florida Democrat of the Year, 2017
- Hispanic Federation, Trailblazer Award, 2017
- League of Women Voters of Florida, Making Democracy Work Award, 2017
- Metropolitan Business Association, Community Champion of the Year, 2017
- Mi Familia Vota, Esperanza Award, 2017
- Victory Institute, Tammy Baldwin Breakthrough Award, 2017
- Florida Education Association (FEA), Human and Civil Rights Leadership Award, 2016
- Florida Young Democrats, Advocate of the Year, 2016
- Out Magazine, OUT100's Survivors and Heroes of Pulse, 2016
- Watermark, Most Remarkable Person, 2015

== See also ==
- Florida House of Representatives
