= William Ray Hodges =

American politician (1926–1982)

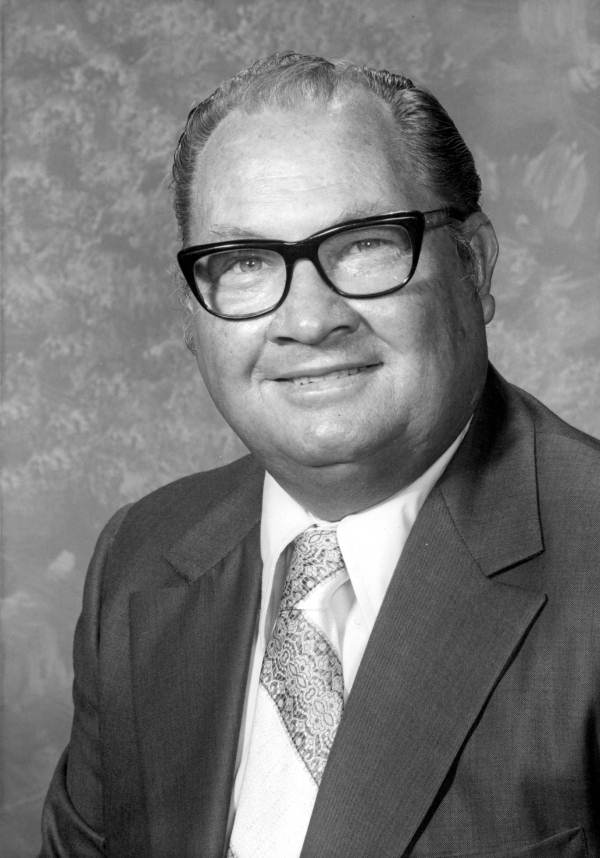
- Hodges in 1980

Member of the Florida House of Representatives from the 104th district
- In office 1980–1982
- Preceded by: William Lockward
- Succeeded by: Barry Kutun

Personal details
- Born: September 20, 1926 Valdosta, Georgia, U.S.
- Died: October 12, 1982 (aged 56)
- Party: Democratic

William Ray Hodges (September 20, 1926 – October 12, 1982) was an American politician. He served as a Democratic member for the 104th district of the Florida House of Representatives.

== Life and career ==
Hodges was born in Valdosta, Georgia. He attended Valdosta High School.

In 1980, Hodges was elected to represent the 104th district of the Florida House of Representatives, succeeding William H. Lockward. He served until 1982, when he was succeeded by Barry Kutun.

Hodges died on October 12, 1982, of heart failure, at the age of 56.
