= Ron Saunders (politician) =

American politician (born 1954)

Ronald Saunders
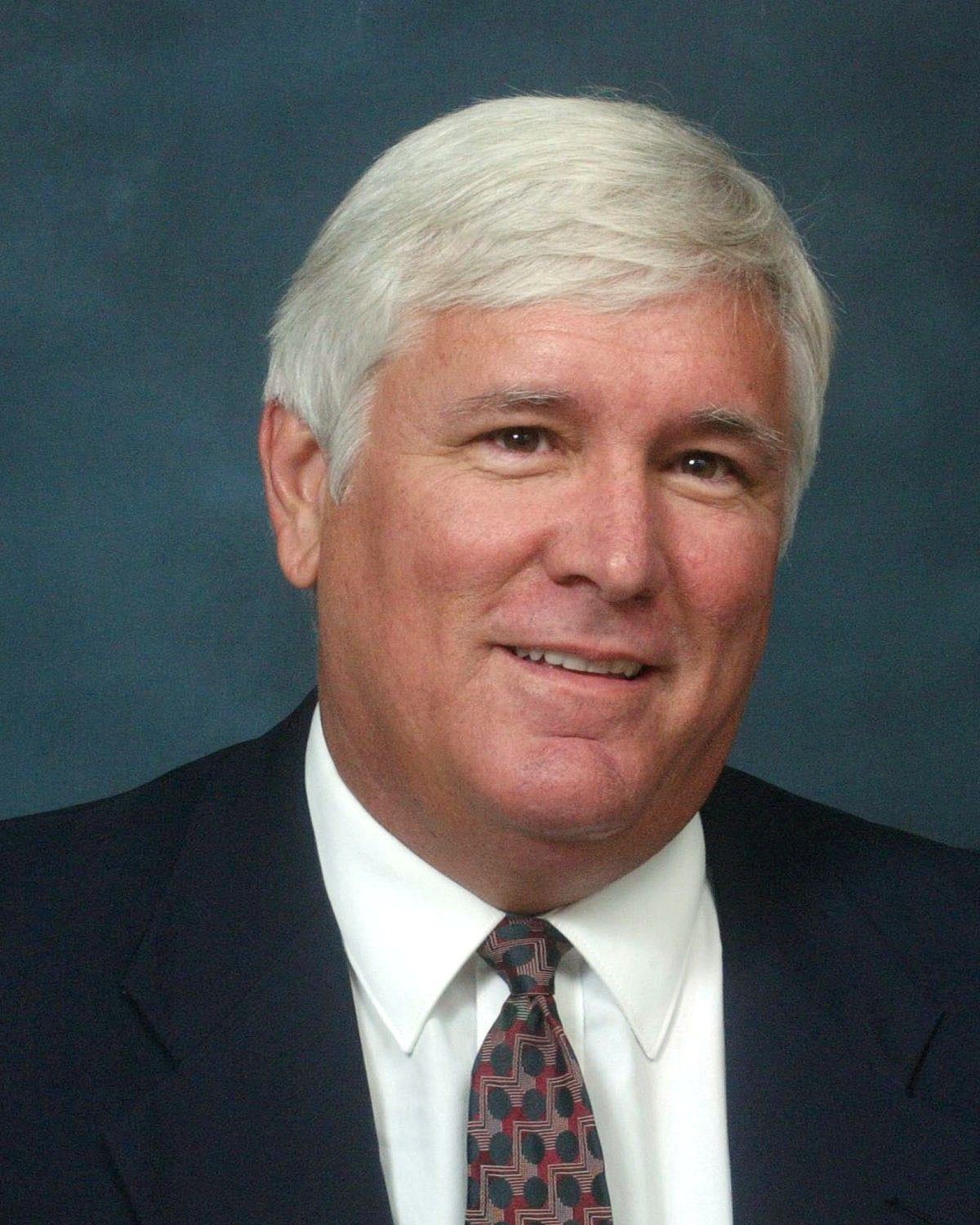

Minority Leader of the Florida House of Representatives
- In office 2010–2012
- Preceded by: Franklin Sands
- Succeeded by: Perry Thurston

Member of the Florida House of Representatives from the 120th district
- In office 2006–2012
- Preceded by: Ken Sorensen
- Succeeded by: Holly Merrill Raschein
- In office 1986–1994
- Preceded by: Joseph B. Allen
- Succeeded by: Deborah Horan

Personal details
- Born: October 30, 1954 (age 71) Key West, Florida
- Party: Democratic
- Spouse: Melodie Saunders
- Children: Ryan
- Education: University of Florida (B.S.) (J.D.)
- Profession: Attorney

Ron Saunders is an American politician who was a Democratic member of the Florida House of Representatives from the 120th District, which includes all of Monroe County and parts of Miami-Dade County, from 1986 to 1994 and again from 2006 to 2012. Saunders was born in Key West in 1954, to Jack A. Saunders, a state representative from 1960 to 1964 who served as a United States magistrate judge from 1978 to 1981. Saunders was a National Merit Scholar in high school and later attended the University of Florida, where he was a member of Florida Blue Key, graduating with his bachelor's degree in 1976 and Juris Doctor in 1979.

In 1986, Saunders ran for the Florida House of Representatives from the 120th District, facing Wilhelmina Harvey and Harry Rosenthal in the Democratic primary. Though Saunders received the most votes, he did not receive a majority, requiring a runoff between him and Harvey, the second place finisher; in the runoff, he defeated Harvey in a landslide. In the general election, he was re-elected without opposition, and was re-elected without opposition in 1988, 1990, and 1992. In 1994, Saunders ran for Secretary of State of Florida, but lost in a tight election to fellow State Representative Sandy Barringer Mortham.

Saunders attempted a political comeback in 2002 by running in the Democratic primary in the 39th Senate District, but narrowly lost to former State Representative Larcenia Bullard, who later won the general election. In 2004, Saunders ran against Bullard again, and though he did better in his second try than in his first, Bullard defeated him again.

In 2006, when State Representative Ken Sorensen, a Republican did not seek re-election in the 120th District, which Saunders had represented years prior, he ran to succeed him. He won the nomination of his party uncontested and defeated his general election opponent, Republican David Rice, by a solid margin to win a fifth nonconsecutive term. He was re-elected without opposition in 2008, but faced a tough fight for re-election in 2010. He faced former Key West Mayor Morgan McPherson, who emerged as the Republican nominee, and Henry Llorella, who was associated with the Tea Party movement; Saunders won re-election with 55% of the vote. Following the 2010 elections, Saunders replaced State Representative Franklin Sands as the Minority Leader in the Florida House of Representatives.

Rather than seek re-election in 2012, Saunders instead made a third run for the Florida Senate from the 39th District, which was open, as Senator Larcenia Bullard could not seek re-election due to term limits. Saunders faced Bullard’s son, State Representative Dwight Bullard, former State Representative James Bush, JJ Johnson, and Sal Gutierrez in the primary. Citing the need of the Florida Keys to have representation in the Senate and Saunders’s knowledge of "how to balance the budget and find money for key economic development projects," the Miami Herald endorsed him. However, Saunders narrowly lost to Bullard, winning 30% of the vote to Bullard’s 35%, with Bush, Johnson, and Gutierrez behind him.

Party political offices
Preceded by Jim Minter	Democratic nominee for Secretary of State of Florida; 1994	Succeeded by Karen Gievers
