= William A. Freeman =

American politician (died 1989)

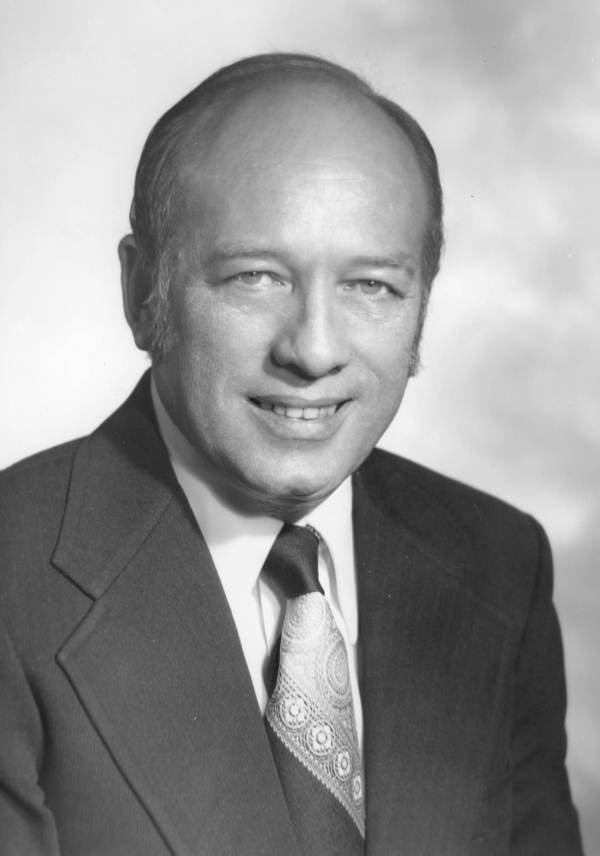
- Freeman in 1974

Member of the Florida House of Representatives from the 120th district
- In office 1974–1976
- Preceded by: Fred Tittle
- Succeeded by: Joseph B. Allen

Personal details
- Died: March 21, 1989 (aged 59)
- Party: Democratic
- Spouse: Elise Curry Freeman
- Children: 1

William A. Freeman (died March 21, 1989) was an American politician. He served as a Democratic member for the 120th district of the Florida House of Representatives.

In 1974, Freeman was elected to represent the 120th district of the Florida House of Representatives, succeeding Fred Tittle. He served until 1976, when he was succeeded by Joseph B. Allen.

After serving in the legislature, Freeman became a candidate to serve as sheriff in Monroe County, Florida. His opponent was Robert Brown. He was a member of the Monroe County Commissioner.

Freeman died on March 21, 1989 of cancer, at the age of 59.
