= Joseph B. Allen =

American politician

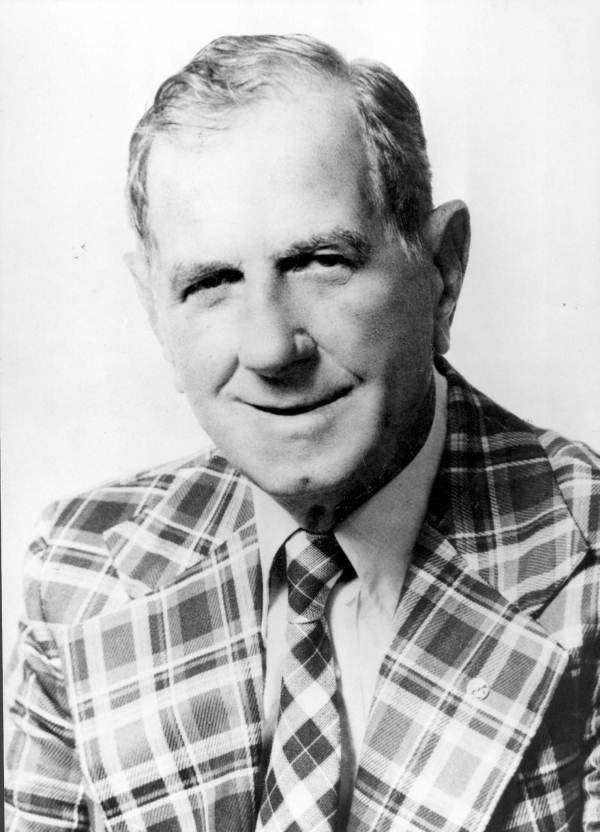
- Allen in 1980

Member of the Florida House of Representatives from the 120th district
- In office 1976–1986
- Preceded by: William A. Freeman
- Succeeded by: Ron Saunders

Personal details
- Born: May 10, 1914
- Died: February 12, 2006 (aged 91)
- Party: Democratic

Joseph B. Allen (May 10, 1914 – February 12, 2006) was an American politician. He served as a Democratic member for the 120th district of the Florida House of Representatives.

Allen was elected for the 120th district of the Florida House of Representatives in 1976, serving until 1986.
