= Robert C. Hector =

American politician (1918–2004)

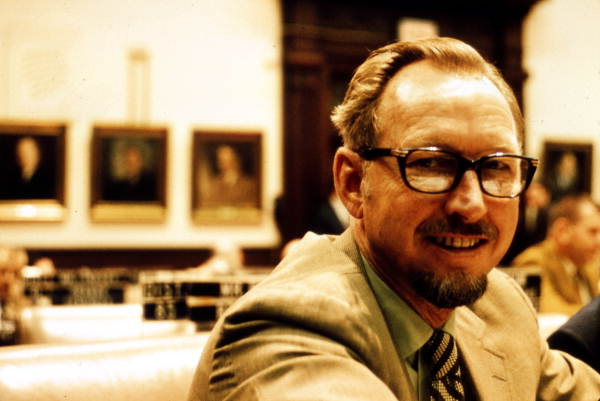
- Hector in 1970

Member of the Florida House of Representatives from Dade County
- In office 1966–1967

Member of the Florida House of Representatives from the 104th district
- In office 1967–1972
- Preceded by: District established
- Succeeded by: William Lockward

Member of the Florida House of Representatives from the 114th district
- In office 1972–1980
- Preceded by: Fred Tittle
- Succeeded by: John Plummer

Personal details
- Born: April 16, 1918 Fort Lauderdale, Florida, U.S.
- Died: April 18, 2004 (aged 86)
- Party: Democratic
- Spouse: Alice Guyton (died. 2001)
- Education: Princeton University

Robert C. Hector (April 16, 1918 – April 18, 2004) was an American politician. He served as a Democratic member for the 104th and 114th district of the Florida House of Representatives.

== Life and career ==
Hector was born in Fort Lauderdale, Florida. He attended Phillips Academy and Princeton University.

In 1966, Hector was elected to the Florida House of Representatives. The next year, he was elected as the first representative for the newly-established 104th district. He served until 1972, when he was succeeded by William Lockward. In the same year, he was elected to represent the 114th district, succeeding Fred Tittle. He served until 1980, when he was succeeded by John Plummer.

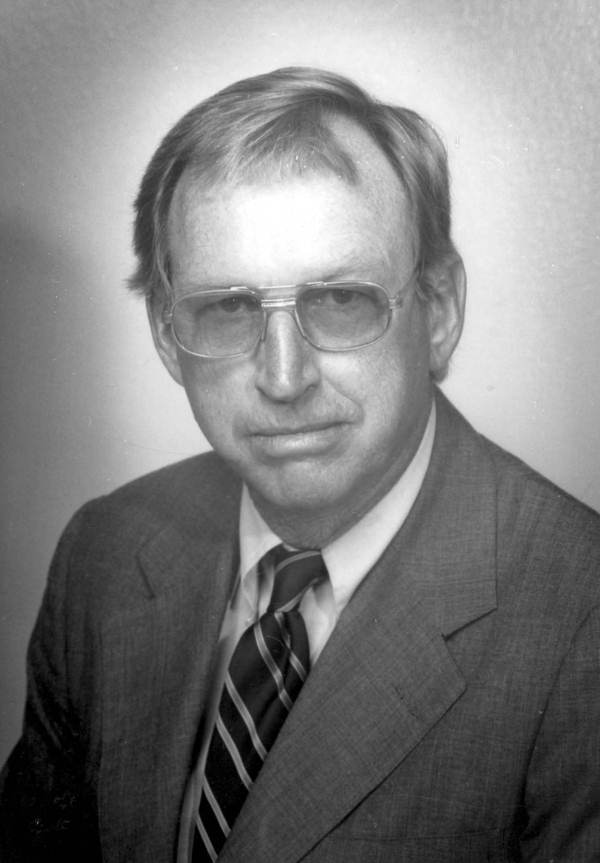
Hector in 1979

Hector died on April 18, 2004, at the age of 86.
