= Jane Aman =

American politician

Member of the Florida House of Representatives from the 37th district
- Incumbent
- Assumed office November 3, 2026
- Preceded by: Susan Plasencia

Personal details
- Party: Democratic

Jane Aman is an American politician. A member of the Democratic Party, she has served in the Florida House of Representatives since 2026, representing the 37th district.
