= Melony Bell =

American politician (born 1961)

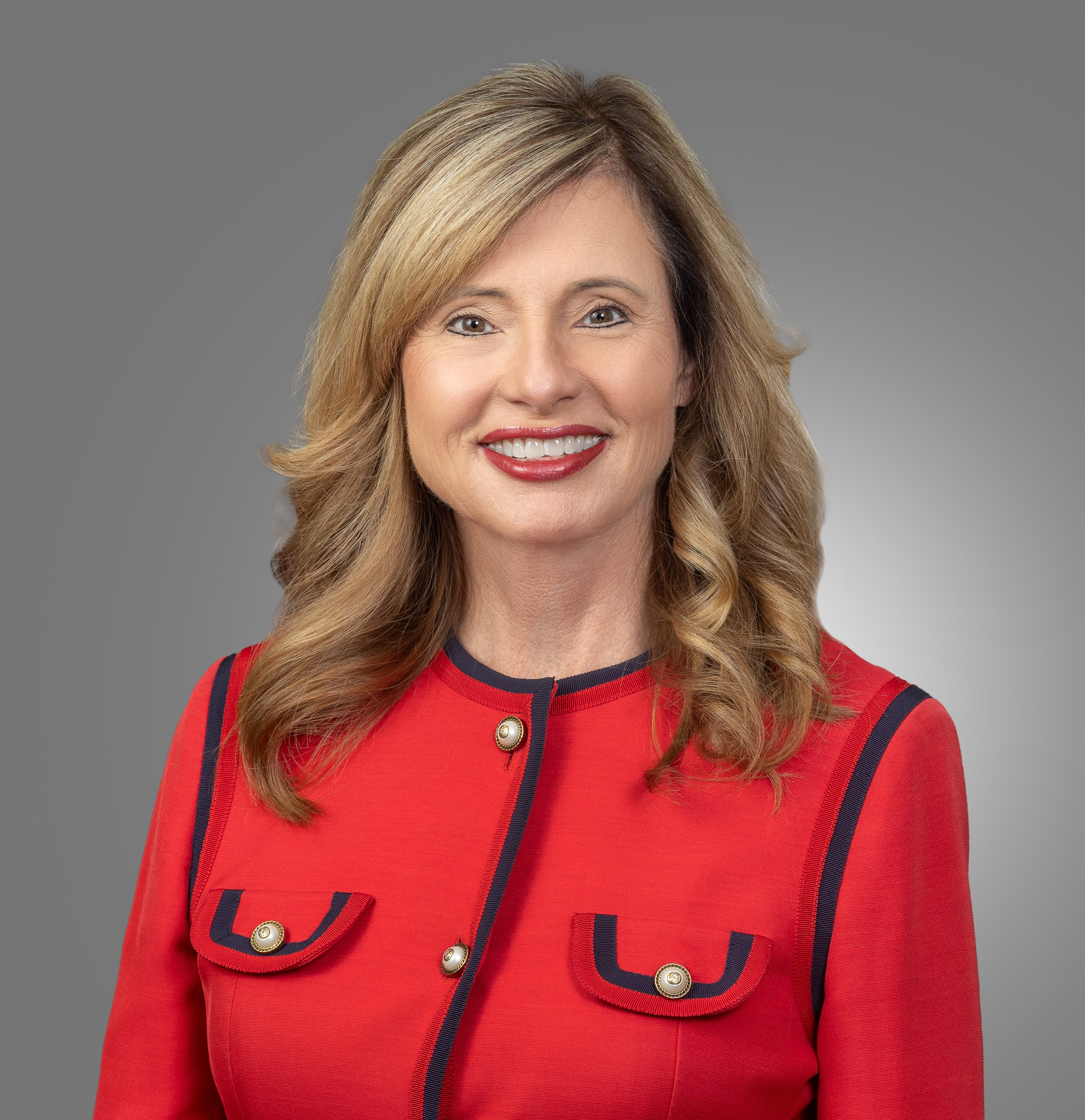
- Official portrait, 2025

Supervisor of Elections of Polk County
- Incumbent
- Assumed office January 7, 2025
- Preceded by: Lori Edwards

Member of the Florida House of Representatives from the 49th district
- In office November 6, 2018 – November 5, 2024
- Preceded by: Ben Albritton
- Succeeded by: Jennifer Kincart Jonsson

Polk County Commissioner
- In office November 2010 – November 6, 2018

Personal details
- Born: October 29, 1961 (age 64) Winter Haven, Florida, U.S.
- Party: Republican
- Spouse: Robbie Bell
- Education: South Florida Community College (AS); Southeastern University (BS)

Melony Mincey Bell (born October 29, 1961) is an American politician who has served as Supervisor of Elections of Polk County since 2025. A member of the Republican Party, she previously served in the Florida House of Representatives from 2018 to 2024, as a Polk County commissioner from 2010 to 2018, as the mayor of Fort Meade, Florida, and as a Fort Meade city commissioner.

== Background ==
Bell was born in Winter Haven, Florida to Ronald and Laverne Mincey. Her family moved to Satellite Beach, Florida when she was young. While in high school, the family returned to Fort Meade, where she met her husband at Fort Meade Middle-Senior High School. Bell earned a bachelor's degree from Southeastern University in Lakeland, Florida and an associate degree from South Florida State College.

Before her career in government, Bell worked as an auditor for the Florida Department of Highway Safety and Motor Vehicles and her husband owns a bee business.

== Political career ==
Bell got her start in politics when she became the lead opposition to the building of a private prison next to Lewis Anna Woodbury Elementary School. Bell served for 14 years on the Fort Meade City Commission, including four terms as mayor, before her election as a county commissioner in 2010.

In 2017, Bell announced that she would be running for District 49 in the Florida House of Representatives in 2018.

In 2024, Bell was elected as Polk County supervisor of elections, a gain for Republicans.
