= Fred Tittle =

American politician (1920–2002)

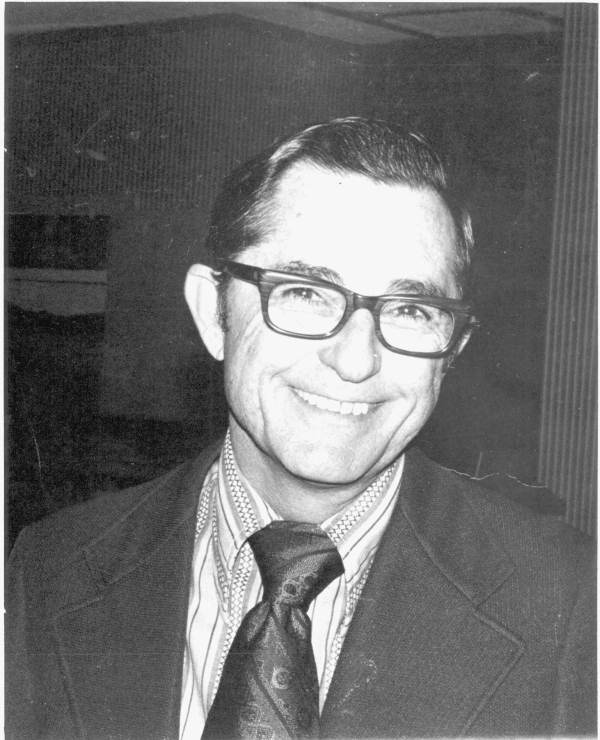
- Tittle in 1972

Member of the Florida House of Representatives from the 114th district
- In office 1970–1972
- Preceded by: William G. Roberts
- Succeeded by: Robert C. Hector

Member of the Florida House of Representatives from the 120th district
- In office 1972–1974
- Preceded by: District established
- Succeeded by: William A. Freeman

Personal details
- Born: October 24, 1920
- Died: November 27, 2002 (aged 82)
- Party: Democratic

Fred N. Tittle (October 24, 1920 – November 27, 2002) was an American politician. He served as a Democratic member for the 114th and 120th district of the Florida House of Representatives.

In 1970, Tittle was elected for the 114th district of the Florida House of Representatives. In 1972 Tittle was elected as the first representative for the newly-established 120th district, serving until 1974.
