= Susan Plasencia =

American politician

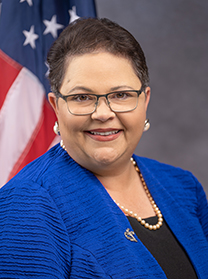

Member of the Florida House of Representatives from the 37th district
- In office November 8, 2022 – November 3, 2026
- Preceded by: Carlos Guillermo Smith (redistricting)
- Succeeded by: Jane Aman

Personal details
- Born: Los Angeles, California, U.S.
- Party: Republican
- Relatives: Rene Plasencia (brother)

Susan Plasencia is a Republican member of the Florida Legislature representing the state's 37th House district, which includes Seminole County and some of Orange County.

Before entering elected office, Plasencia worked as a small business owner and runs the events company behind Festival Calle Orange, an annual Hispanic cultural festival held in downtown Orlando. She is the sister of Rene Plasencia.

== Career ==
In 2024, Plasencia was re-elected to a second term, defeating Democratic nominee Nate Douglas. In the 2025 legislative session, Plasencia sponsored House Bill 351, commonly referred to as the "Super Speeder" bill, which proposed enhanced penalties for drivers convicted of excessive speeding.

== Committee assignments ==
During the 2022 to 2024 term, Plasencia served as Vice Chair of the Higher Education Budget Subcommittee and as a member of the Infrastructure Strategies Committee, the Children, Families & Seniors Subcommittee, the Education Quality Subcommittee, the Infrastructure & Tourism Appropriations Subcommittee, and the Postsecondary Education & Workforce Subcommittee.

During the 2024 to 2026 term, she served as Vice Chair of the Health & Human Services Committee and Vice Chair of the Civil Justice & Claims Subcommittee, and as a member of the Rules & Ethics Committee, the Careers & Workforce Subcommittee, the Government Operations Subcommittee, and the Human Services Subcommittee.

== Legislation ==
In the 2023 session, Plasencia was a sponsor, with Representative Kaylee Tuck, of House Bill 1, which expanded eligibility for Florida's school choice scholarship programs to all state residents eligible to enroll in K-12 public school. The bill passed the House by a vote of 83 to 27.

Also in 2023, Plasencia sponsored the House companion to legislation that became the Roller Skating Rink Safety Act, codified at section 768.395, Florida Statutes. The act defines the inherent risks of roller skating and sets out the respective duties of rink operators and skaters, making Florida the twelfth state to adopt such a law.

In the 2025 session, Plasencia sponsored House Bill 223, which would have required nursing homes and assisted living facilities to permit residents to install video and audio monitoring devices in their rooms. The bill drew support from advocates for elderly residents and opposition from nursing home and assisted living industry groups on privacy grounds. The bill died in the Judiciary Committee.
