= Deborah Horan =

American politician

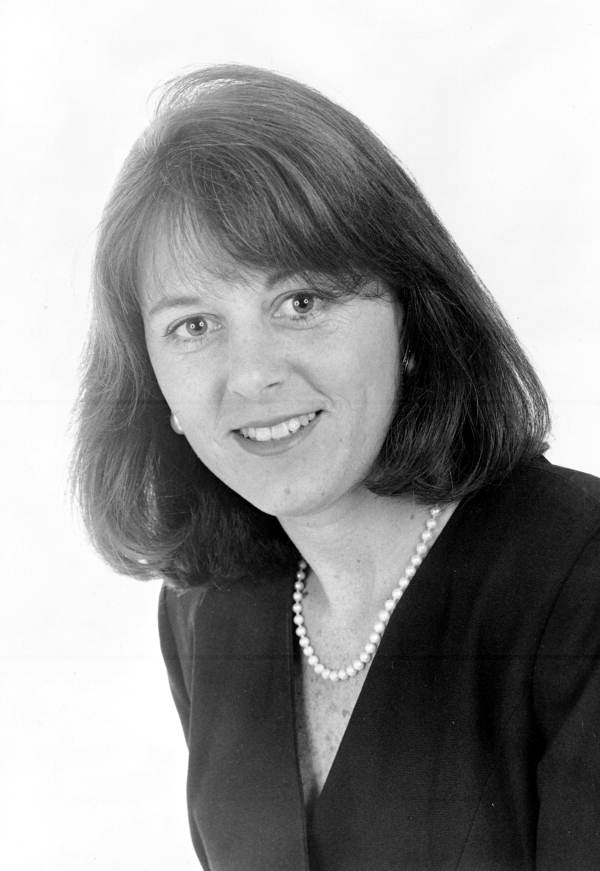

Member of the Florida House of Representatives from the 120th district
- In office 1994–1998
- Preceded by: Ron Saunders
- Succeeded by: Ken Sorensen

Personal details
- Born: December 10, 1962 (age 63) Quincy, Florida, U.S.
- Party: Democratic
- Spouse: Buzz Ritchie

Deborah James Horan Ritchie (born December 10, 1962) is an American politician in the state of Florida. A Democrat, she served in the Florida House of Representatives for the 120th district between 1994 and 1998.

== Early life ==
Horan was born on December 10, 1962, in Quincy, Florida, and grew up in Chattahoochee. She received an associate degree from Chipola College in 1982 and her bachelors of science degree in business from the Florida State University (FSU) in 1984. While at FSU, she was a member of the Kappa Delta sorority, where she was treasurer of her pledge class and a chaplain, and participated in the governor's internship program under Governor Bob Graham. She worked as a legislative aide.

== Political career ==
Horan was a member of the Florida House of Representatives for the 120th district between 1994 and 1998, representing the Democratic Party. She won her first election on November 8, 1994, against Republican Bill Dalton with 54.3% of the vote. In 1996, she sponsored a bill to allow parents to decide which school in a district their children would attend. She retired in 1998 to spend more time with her family.

== Later career ==
Horan founded Impact 100 Pensacola Bay Area, an organization providing grants to nonprofits, in 2004. She chaired the board of directors for Gulf Coast Kid's House and worked for Studer Group, starting as chief operations officer in 2006 and becoming the president in 2016.

== Personal life ==
Horan has two children: Lindsey Nicole and Kelsey Virginia. She married Buzz Ritchie, a former legislator, and moved from Key West to Pensacola in the late 1990s.
