= William Lockward =

American politician (1918–2004)

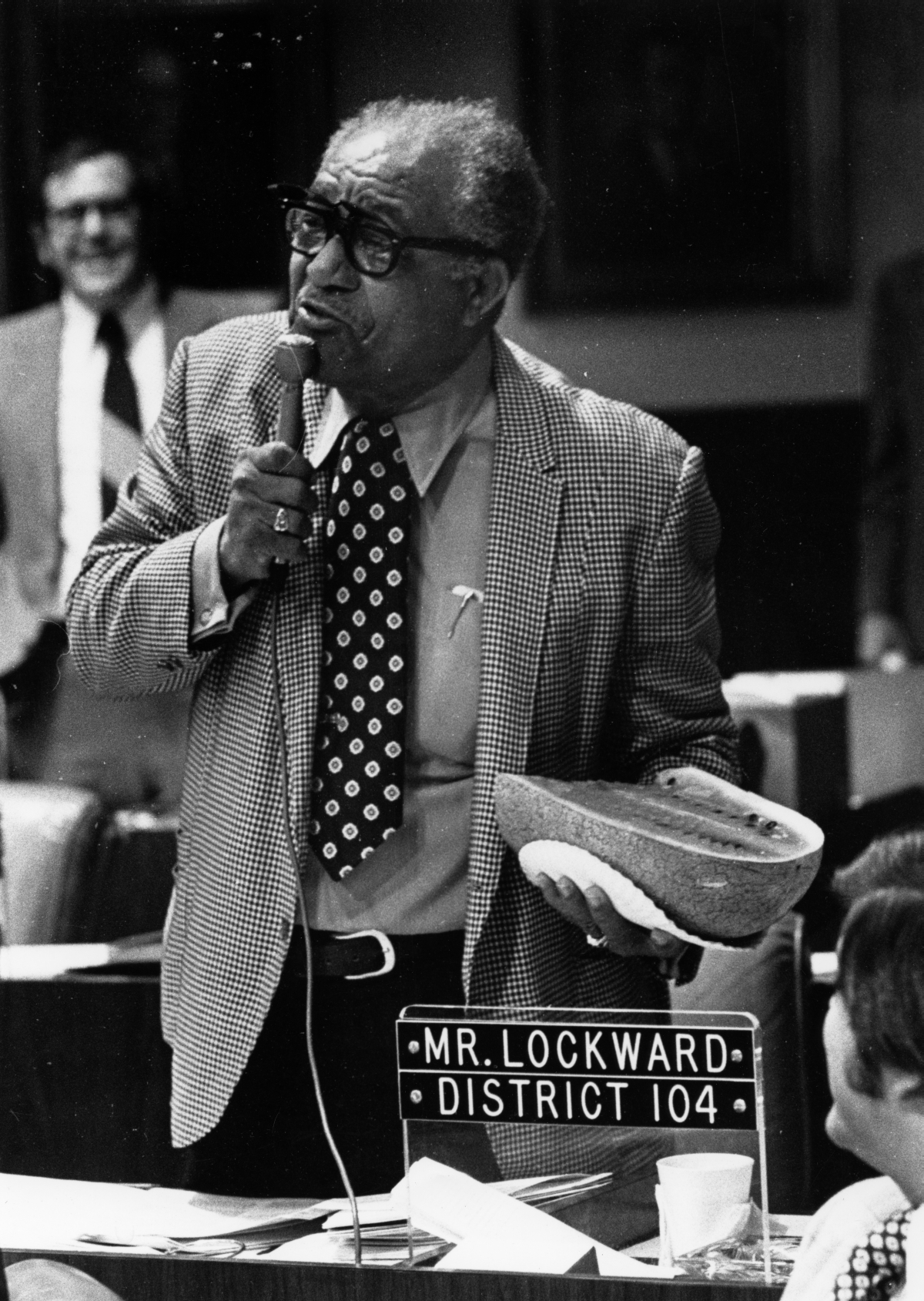
- Lockward in the 1970s

Member of the Florida House of Representatives from the 104th district
- In office 1972–1980
- Preceded by: Robert C. Hector
- Succeeded by: William Ray Hodges

Personal details
- Born: October 17, 1918 Ridgewood, New York, U.S.
- Died: February 22, 2004 (aged 85)
- Party: Democratic
- Education: University of Miami

William H. Lockward (October 17, 1918 – February 22, 2004) was an American politician. He served as a Democratic member for the 104th district of the Florida House of Representatives.

== Life and career ==
Lockward was born in Ridgewood, New York. He attended the University of Miami.

In 1972, Lockward was elected to represent the 104th district of the Florida House of Representatives, succeeding Robert C. Hector. He served until 1980, when he was succeeded by William Ray Hodges.

Lockward died on February 22, 2004, at the age of 85.
