= Steven Effman =

American politician and attorney (born 1950)

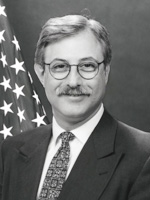

Member of the Florida House of Representatives from the 98th district
- In office November 5, 1996 – November 7, 2000
- Preceded by: Steven Feren
- Succeeded by: Roger Wishner

Personal details
- Born: October 13, 1950 (age 75) New York, New York
- Party: Democratic
- Children: Amy, Scott
- Education: University of Massachusetts (B.A.); Hofstra University (M.S.); The John Marshall Law School (J.D.)
- Occupation: Attorney

Steven Effman (born October 13, 1950) is an American politician and attorney who served as a member of the Florida House of Representatives from 1996 to 2000. He is a Democrat.

== Early life and career ==
Effman was born in New York City. He attended the University of Massachusetts Amherst, receiving his bachelor's degree in political science in 1972, and Hofstra University, where he received a master's degree in secondary education in 1973. Effman then attended the John Marshall Law School, receiving his juris doctor in 1976. He moved to Florida in 1977.

== Sunrise city government ==
Effman ran for a seat on the Sunrise City Commission in 1981, defeating incumbent Commissioner C. Murray Gold.

In 1982, following the retirement of Democratic State Representative Terry O'Malley, Effman ran to succeed him in the 90th District, and resigned from his seat on the City Commission. However, he was defeated in the Democratic primary by attorney Peter Deutsch, who won the general election.

After Sunrise City Commissioner John Montgomery was convicted of extortion and tax evasion and removed from office by Governor Bob Graham in 1985, Effman won the 1986 special election to succeed him, and returned to the City Commission. He was re-elected in 1987 and 1991.

Effman ran for Mayor of Sunrise in 1993, and faced former Mayor John Lomelo, who was previously convicted of conspiracy to commit extortion. Effman defeated Lomelo in a landslide.

== Florida House of Representatives ==
In 1996, incumbent Democratic State Representative Steven Feren opted to run for the State Senate rather than seek re-election, and Effman ran to succeed him in the 98th District; he was elected unopposed. Effman was re-elected in 1998 without opposition.

Effman declined to seek re-election to a third term in 2000. Earlier in the year, news broke that Effman had engaged in a sexual relationship with a woman he represented in a divorce case and entered into a confidential settlement to pay her $150,000. Following Effman's announcement that he would not seek re-election, two other former clients alleged that Effman had entered into sexual relationships with them.

After finding that Effman had engaged in three sexual relationships with former clients, the Florida Supreme Court suspended Effman from the practice of law for 91 days, effective April 21, 2003.
