= Clarence Roberts =

Clarence Roberts may refer to:

- Clarence J. Roberts (1873–1931), justice of the New Mexico Supreme Court
- C. A. Roberts (Clarence Abram Roberts, 1903–1973), Florida state legislator
- Clarrie Roberts (Clarence Richard Roberts, 1888–1966), Australian rules footballer
- Skipper Roberts (baseball) (Clarence Ashley Roberts, 1888–1963), American baseball player
