= Roger Wishner =

American politician and attorney (born 1957)

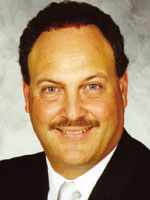

Member of the Florida House of Representatives from the 98th district
- In office November 7, 2000 – November 2, 2004
- Preceded by: Steven Effman
- Succeeded by: Franklin Sands

Personal details
- Born: August 19, 1957 (age 69) Miami Beach, Florida, U.S.
- Party: Democratic
- Children: 2
- Education: Miami-Dade Community College (A.A.)

Roger B. Wishner (born August 19, 1957) is an American politician and attorney who served as a member of the Florida House of Representatives from 2000 to 2004. He is a Democrat.

== Early life and career ==
Wishner was born in Miami Beach, Florida. He attended Miami-Dade Community College, graduating with his associate degree.

== Sunrise City Commission ==
In 1987, Wishner was elected to the Sunrise City Commission, defeating incumbent Commissioner Bernie Weiselberg. He was re-elected in 1991 over former City Commissioner Bill Colon, and in 1995 against high school teacher Arthur Goldsmith, despite Mayor Steven Effman's campaign to defeat him. He was re-elected to a final term in 1999.

== Florida House of Representatives ==
In 2000, incumbent Democratic Representative Steven Effman declined to seek re-election to a third term following a sex scandal, and Wishner ran to succeed him in the 98th District. He won the Democratic nomination unopposed, and faced Republican Craig Appleman in the general election. Wishner defeated Appleman in a landslide, receiving 67 percent of the vote.

Wishner ran for re-election in 2002 and faced businessman Franklin Sands in the Democratic primary. He won renomination, winning 55 percent of the vote to Sands's 45 percent, and faced only write-in opposition in the general election.

== 2004 Broward County Commission campaign ==
In 2004, Broward County Commissioner Lori Parrish opted to run for County Property Appraiser instead of re-election, and Wisher opted to run to succeed her rather than seek re-election to a third term in the State House. He faced School Board member Lois Wexler, Cooper City Mayor Suellen Fardelmann, and former Pembroke Pines Mayor Alex Fekete in the Democratic primary. Wexler ultimately won the primary, receiving 36 percent of the vote to Fardelmann's 28 percent, Fekete's 20 percent, and Wishner's 16 percent.

== Post-legislative career ==
Wishner successfully ran for the Sunrise City Commission again in 2007, defeating incumbent Commissioner Irwin Harlem. He was appointed Deputy Mayor of the Commission and, after Mayor Steven Feren was elected to the 17th Judicial Circuit Court in 2008, served out the remainder of Feren's term as Mayor.

Wishner ran for a full term as Mayor in 2010, and was challenged by attorney Mike Ryan and retired social worker Imogene Ferguson. Wishner lost the election to Ryan by a wide margin, receiving 36 percent of the vote to Ryan's 55 percent. Following Wishner's defeat, he returned to his City Commission seat and ran for re-election, but was defeated by fellow City Commissioner Larry Sofield.

In the 2012 presidential election, Wishner endorsed Republican Mitt Romney over incumbent President Barack Obama, and became one of the co-chairs of "Florida Democrats for Mitt Romney."
