= Rene Plasencia =

American politician

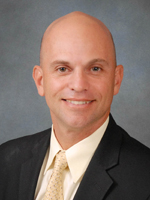

Member of the Florida House of Representatives
- In office November 4, 2014 – November 8, 2022
- Preceded by: Joe Saunders
- Succeeded by: Jennifer Canady
- Constituency: 49th district (2014–2016); 50th district (2016–2022)

Personal details
- Born: Rene Plasencia; January 8, 1973 (age 53) Orlando, Florida, U.S.
- Party: Republican
- Spouses: Yvonne Montalvo (divorced) Marucci Guzman (married)
- Children: 3
- Relatives: Susan Plasencia (sister)
- Education: Dr. Phillips High School
- Alma mater: University of Central Florida (BA)
- Profession: Teacher
- Website: https://www.votecoachp.com
- Nickname: Coach P.

Rene "Coach P" Plasencia (born January 8, 1973) is an American Republican politician who served as a member of the Florida House of Representatives, representing the 50th District (including southeast Orange County and the northern portion of Brevard County) from 2016 to 2022. (Note: He resigned after taking a job with IBM.) He previously was elected in the 49th District in 2014, in Orange County.

Plasencia was born and raised in Orlando, Florida. He graduated from the University Of Central Florida. After teaching at Colonial High School, he ran for Florida State House of Representatives in 2014.

== Personal life ==
=== Early life ===
Rene Plasencia was born on January 8, 1973, to a Puerto Rican mother and a Cuban-native father, in Orlando, Florida, and attended Dr. Phillips High School and then the University of Central Florida, where he started the first student-athlete advisory board. In 1996, he graduated with his bachelor's degree in psychology, and then began working as a government teacher for 15 years at Colonial High School. While Plasencia taught at Colonial High School, he became a track and cross-country coach where he had received the nickname "Coach P."

He is the brother of Susan Plasencia.

Plasencia's wife Marucci ran for the Florida House in a 2024 special election losing to fellow Democrat Tom Keen who would go on to serve District 35. Guzman did not live in the district at the time when she was running for office and was accused of being tied to her Republican husband.

=== Professional career ===
In May 2021, Plasencia became the Executive Director of the Florida Veterinary Medical Association, an association that lobbies on behalf of the nearly 6,000 state licensed veterinarians and their staffs. He left that position after only five months.

== Florida House of Representatives ==
=== Florida House of Representatives, District 49 ===
In 2014, incumbent State Representative Joe Saunders, a Democrat, ran for re-election in the 49th District, so Plasencia ran against him. He faced Ed Rodriguez, a retired police detective, in the Republican primary. Plasencia campaigned on his opposition to the Common Core Standards and standardized tests, saying, "We need to give teachers the ability to teach. A lot of what we do is almost clerical work." He ended up defeating Rodriguez in a landslide, winning the primary with 77% of the vote and advancing to the general election, where he faced Saunders. Plasencia argued that raising the minimum wage to $10.10 an hour, which Saunders supported, was a "jobs killer," and praised Governor Rick Scott on "gun rights, economics, taxes, and pro-growth strategies," while also emphasizing that he supported public education. The Orlando Sentinel, while praising Plasencia as a "passionate advocate for education," endorsed Saunders, noting that "public schools already have a champion in Saunders." Ultimately, however, Plasencia defeated Saunders by just seven hundred votes, winning his first term in the legislature with 51% of the vote.

=== Florida House of Representatives, District 50 ===
In November 2016, Plasencia was elected as a representative for the 50th district after defeating Democratic candidate Sean Ashby, and succeeding after Republican State representative Tom Goodson, following his term in the 49th District.

Following 2020, Plasencia won against Democratic candidate Nina Yoakum, a full-time substitute teacher, for reelection of the 50th district. Plasencia won by having 57.2% of the votes. However in 2022, he resigned for a position as a lead account partner in IBM.

== Political positions ==
Rene Plasencia is a Republican conservative.

=== Economy ===
Plasencia is a current member of the Florida Commerce Committee since 2018. He was also appointed as chair to serve in the Florida Workforce Development & Tourism Subcommittee. Plasencia has also pushed towards the Competitive Workforce Act which prevents gender discrimination in the workforce.

=== Gun control ===
During his time in the 49th District, Plasencia defended for 2nd Amendment Rights and had previously received an "A" rating from the NRA Political Victory Fund (NRA-PVF). After the Stoneman Douglas High School Shooting in Parkland, Florida, Plasencia voted for the Florida Senate Bill 7026, along with other Republicans, to ban bump stocks and to raise the minimum age from 18 to 21 to purchase firearms. As of 2018 Plasencia holds a "C" rating from the NRA-PVF.

== Electoral history ==
=== Florida House District 49, 2014-2016 ===
2014 Republican Primary District 49
Party	Candidate	Votes	%
Republican	Rene Plasencia	4,036	77.0%
Republican	Ed Rodriguez	12,880	23.0%
Total votes		5,239	100.0

2014 General Elections, District 49
Party	Candidate	Votes	%	±%
Republican	Rene Plasencia	19,119	51.0%	+7.0
Democratic	Joe Saunders (incumbent)	18,405	49.0%	−7.0
Total votes		37,524	100.0%	N/A
Republican gain from Democratic				

=== Florida House District 50, 2016-2022 ===
==== 2016 Elections ====
2016 Primary Elections, District 50
Party	Candidate	Votes	%
Republican	Rene Plasencia	6,664	52.1%
Republican	George Collins	6,124	47.9%
Total votes		12,788	100.0

2016 General Elections, District 50
Party	Candidate	Votes	%	±%
Republican	Rene Plasencia	50,962	57.3%	+4.1
Democratic	Sean Ashby	37,96	42.7%	−4.1
Total votes		88,922	100.0%	N/A
Republican hold				

==== 2018 Elections ====
2018 Republican Primary District 50
Party	Candidate	Votes	%
Republican	Rene Plasencia	10,150	63.8%
Republican	George Collins	5,766	36.2%
Total votes		15,816	100.0

2018 General Elections, District 50
Party	Candidate	Votes	%	±%
Republican	Rene Plasencia	44,923	55.3%	−2.0
Democratic	Pam Dirschka	36,292	44.7%	+2.0
Total votes		81,215	100.0%	
Republican hold				

== See also ==
- Florida House of Representatives
- Project Lead the Way
