= Theodore Bissell =

American politician

Member of the Florida House of Representatives from Dade County
- In office 1858 – December 7, 1861

Theodore Bissell was an American politician. He served in the Florida House of Representatives from 1858 to 1861.

On December 7, 1861, Bissell was expelled from the House by a unanimous vote, for "being a disloyal fugitive from the support and service of his country and his home, in the day of apparent peril", cited by the Florida Legislature.
