= Franklin Sands =

American politician (born 1940)

Member of the Florida House of Representatives from the 98th district
- In office November 2, 2004 – November 6, 2012
- Preceded by: Roger Wishner
- Succeeded by: Katie Edwards-Walpole

Personal details
- Born: July 12, 1940 (age 86) New York City, New York
- Party: Democratic
- Children: Rob, Roger, Stephanie, David, Dana, Charlie, Alexander, Jacqueline
- Education: Brooklyn College
- Occupation: Businessman

Franklin Sands (born July 12, 1940) is a former member of the Florida House of Representatives.

Sands was born in Brooklyn, New York and attended Brooklyn College, studying the culinary arts. After college, Sands bought a mail-order jewelry company, which he operated successfully. Upon selling the company, he invested in a minor league basketball franchise as well as in hotels and a casino before moving to Florida with his family in 1982.

Sands, currently a businessman, lives in Weston, Florida. He was elected to the Florida House of Representatives to represent District 98 (encompassing parts of Broward County, Florida (portions of the cities of Sunrise, Plantation, and Weston) in 2004 and reelected in 2006, 2008, and 2010.

Sands served as the (minority) Democratic Whip from 2004 to 2006 and served as the Democratic Leader until 2010. Sands lost much of his life savings in the Madoff investment scandal.

After serving the maximum 8 years in the Florida House, Sands ran for the Broward County School Board and was defeated by Donna Korn.

Sands is a prominent advocate for biomedical research, especially embryonic stem cell research. He serves on the Broward County Children's Services Board; the Broward County Coordinating Board for Transportation Disadvantaged Services; the Broward County School Board's Facilities Task Force; and the City of Weston's Charter Review Board.

Sands is Jewish and is married to Leslie Sands. The couple have eight children—Rob, Roger, Stephanie, David, Dana, Charlie, Alexander, and Jacqueline.

== Sources ==
- Florida House Democratic Caucus Web Site
- Florida House of Representatives Profile
