= Jim Mooney (Florida politician) =

Florida politician

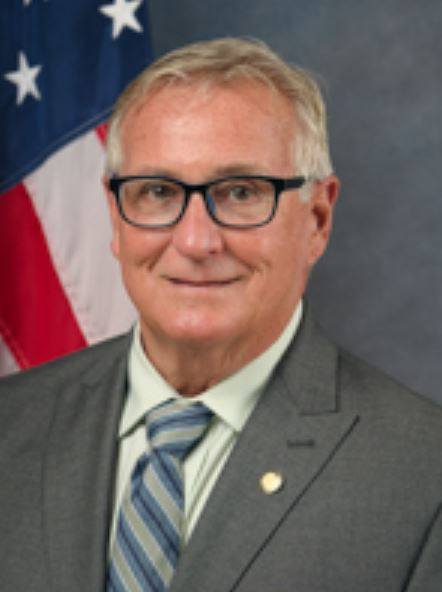

Member of the Florida House of Representatives from the 120th district
- Incumbent
- Assumed office November 3, 2020
- Preceded by: Holly Merrill Raschein

Personal details
- Born: James Vernon Mooney Jr.
- Party: Republican
- Education: University of Miami

James Vernon Mooney Jr. is an American politician who serves in the Florida House of Representatives from the 120th district as a member of the Republican Party. Prior to his tenure in the state house he was active in local politics in Islamorada, Florida.

== Early life and education ==
James Vernon Mooney Jr. graduated from the University of Miami with a bachelor's degree.

== Career ==
=== Local politics ===
Mooney served on the council in Islamorada, Florida, from 1998 to 2002, and during his tenure he served as mayor for one year. He defeated incumbent councilor Ken Philipson for a seat on the Islamorada council from the third district in the 2014 election.

=== Florida House of Representatives ===
Holly Merrill Raschein, the incumbent member of the Florida House of Representatives from the 120th district, was term-limited during the 2020 election and Mooney announced that he would run for the Republican nomination to succeed her in 2019. During the primary he was endorsed by Raschein. Mooney defeated Rhonda Rebman Lopez and Alexandria Suarez in the primary and defeated Democratic nominee Clint Barras in the general election.

During Mooney's tenure in the state house he served on the Environment, Agriculture and Flooding, Infrastructure and Tourism, and the Early Learning and Elementary Education subcommittees.

== Electoral history ==
2020 Florida House of Representatives 120th district Republican primary
Party	Candidate	Votes	%
Republican	Jim Mooney	4,747	35.40%
Republican	Rhonda Rebman Lopez	4,599	34.30%
Republican	Alexandria Suarez	4,062	30.30%
Total votes		13,408	100.00%

2020 Florida House of Representatives 120th district election
Party	Candidate	Votes	%	±%
Republican	Jim Mooney	45,698	54.98%	▲1.88
Democratic	Clint Barras	37,426	45.02%	▼1.88
Total votes		83,124	100.00%	
Republican hold				

2022 Florida House of Representatives 120th district Republican primary
Party	Candidate	Votes	%
Republican	Jim Mooney (incumbent)	5,037	45.26%
Republican	Rhonda Lopez	4,947	44.46%
Republican	Alexandria Suarez	1,144	10.28%
Total votes		11,128	100.00%

2022 Florida House of Representatives 120th district election
Party	Candidate	Votes	%	±%
Republican	Jim Mooney (incumbent)	31,788	60.60%	▲5.62
Democratic	Adam Gentle	20,662	39.40%	▼5.62
Total votes		52,450	100.00%	
Republican hold				

2024 Florida House of Representatives 120th district election
Party	Candidate	Votes	%	±%
Republican	Jim Mooney (incumbent)	47,562	63.06%	▲2.46
Democratic	Michael Travis	27,859	36.94%	▼2.46
Total votes		75,421	100.00%	
Republican hold				
