= Florida's 120th House of Representatives district =

American legislative district

Florida's 120th State House of Representatives district
Representative
Jim Mooney; R–Islamorada
- Registration: 49.3% Republican; 49.2% Democratic; 1.5% No party preference
- Demographics: 41.6% White; 11.5% Black; 44.9% Hispanic; 1.9% Asian; 2.1% Native American; 0.2% Hawaiian/Pacific Islander
- Population (2020) • Voting age: 183,229; 18

Florida's 120th House of Representatives district elects one member of the Florida House of Representatives. The district is represented by Jim Mooney. The district covers Monroe County and part of Miami-Dade, including the Florida Keys archipelago.

== Members ==
Representative	Party	Years of service	Hometown	Notes
Fred Tittle	Democratic	1972–1974		
William A. Freeman	Democratic	1974–1976		
Joseph B. Allen	Democratic	1976–1986		
Ron Saunders	Democratic	1986–1994		
Deborah Horan	Democratic	1994–1998		
Ken Sorensen	Republican	1998–2006		
Ron Saunders	Democratic	2006–2012		
Holly Merrill Raschein	Republican	November 6, 2012 – November 3, 2020		
Jim Mooney	Republican	November 3, 2020 – Present	Islamorada	

== Election results ==
=== 2020 ===
2020 Florida House of Representatives election, District 120
Primary election
Party	Candidate	Votes	%
Republican	Jim Mooney	4,747	35.40
Republican	Rhonda Rebman Lopez	4,599	34.30
Republican	Alexandria Suarez	4,062	30.30
Total votes		13,408	100.00
General election
Republican	Jim Mooney	45,698	54.98
Democratic	Clint Barass	37,426	45.02
Total votes		83,124	100.00
Republican hold			

=== 2018 ===
2018 Florida House of Representatives election, District 120
Party	Candidate	Votes	%
Republican	Holly Merrill Raschein	31,878	53.09
Democratic	Steve Friedman	28,172	46.91
Total votes		60,050	100.00
Republican hold			

=== 2016 ===
2016 Florida House of Representatives election, District 120
Party	Candidate	Votes	%
Republican	Holly Merrill Raschein	39,080	57.31
Democratic	Dan Horton	29,108	42.69
Total votes		68,188	100.00
Republican hold			

=== 2014 ===
There were no candidates from the Democratic Party that had filed for the 2014 general election.

2014 Florida House of Representatives election, District 120
Party	Candidate	Votes	%
Republican	Holly Merrill Raschein	0	100.00
Total votes		0	100.00
Republican hold			

=== 2012 ===
2012 Florida House of Representatives election, District 120
Primary election
Party	Candidate	Votes	%
Republican	Holly Merrill Raschein	5,731	66.06
Republican	Morgan McPherson	2,945	33.94
Total votes		8,676	100.00
General election
Republican	Holly Merrill Raschein	30,974	52.42
Democratic	Ian Whitney	28,118	47.58
Total votes		59,092	100.00
Republican gain from Democratic			

=== 2010 ===
2010 Florida House of Representatives election, District 120
Primary election
Party	Candidate	Votes	%
Republican	Morgan McPherson	4,790	55.68
Republican	Matt Gardi	3,813	44.32
Total votes		8,603	100.00
General election
Democratic	Ron Saunders	22,301	55.40
Republican	Morgan McPherson	15,718	39.05
Tea Party	Henry Llorella	2,233	5.55
Total votes		40,252	100.00
Democratic hold			
