= Jennifer Kincart Jonsson =

American politician from Florida

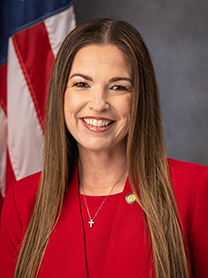
- Official portrait, c. 2024

Member of the Florida House of Representatives from the 49th district
- Incumbent
- Assumed office November 5, 2024
- Preceded by: Melony Bell

Personal details
- Born: November 28, 1977 (age 48) Jacksonville, Florida, U.S.
- Party: Republican
- Spouse: Eric Jonsson (m. 2002)
- Children: 3
- Education: University of Florida (BS, MPH)
- Website: Official website

Jennifer Kincart Jonsson (born November 28, 1977) is an American businesswoman and politician serving as a Republican member of the Florida House of Representatives since 2024.

== Early life and education ==
Kincart Jonsson was born on November 28, 1977, in Jacksonville, Florida. In 1996, she graduated from Lakeland Senior High School. In 2000, she earned her bachelor's degree in public health and earned her master's degree in 2001 from the University of Florida.

== Florida House of Representatives ==
Kincart Jonsson won the August primary with 51% of the vote. She went on to defeat Democratic nominee Ashley Herrmann in the general election. She was sworn into office on November 19, 2024; representing all of Polk County, Florida south of Lakeland.

== Personal life ==
Kincart Jonsson is a Protestant Christian. She married her husband Eric Jonsson in 2002; they have three children and live in Polk County, Florida.

Florida House of Representatives
Preceded by Melony Bell	Member of the Florida House of Representatives from the 49th district 2024–present	Incumbent
