= Ken Sorensen =

American politician

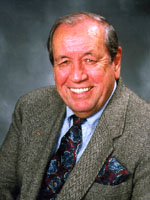

Member of the Florida House of Representatives from the 120th district
- In office 1998–2006
- Preceded by: Deborah Horan
- Succeeded by: Ron Saunders

Personal details
- Born: November 4, 1934 Chicago, Illinois
- Died: July 6, 2012 (aged 77) Key Largo, Florida
- Party: Republican
- Spouse(s): Diane Matrella, Kay Anderson
- Profession: University Professor

Kenneth Paul Sorensen (November 4, 1934 – July 6, 2012) was an American politician.

Sorensen previously served as a Representative in the House of Representatives of the U.S. state of Florida. He lived in Key Largo, Florida with his family. Sorenson died on July 6, 2012, at the age of 77.

== Education ==
- B.S. from Quincy University
- M.A. from Florida State University
- Ph.D. from University of Zagreb
