= Jennifer Canady =

American politician

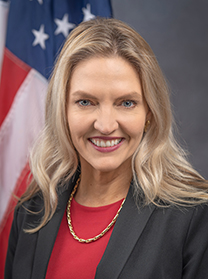

Member of the Florida House of Representatives from the 50th district
- Incumbent
- Assumed office November 8, 2022
- Preceded by: Rene Plasencia

Personal details
- Born: July 22, 1973 (age 53) Lakeland, Florida, U.S.
- Party: Republican
- Spouse: Charles T. Canady
- Children: 2
- Education: Florida State University (BS); University of South Florida (MS)

Jennifer Canady is an American politician. She serves as a Republican member for the 50th district of the Florida House of Representatives. She serves as the Chair of the Education and Employment Committee.

== Early life and marriage ==
Canady was born in Lakeland, Florida. She attended Florida State University and the University of South Florida. She was a teacher.

She married Charles T. Canady, former U.S. Representative and Justice of the Florida Supreme Court.

== Political career ==
In 2021, Canady ran as a candidate in the Republican primary election for the 40th district of the Florida House of Representatives. She was unsuccessful. In 2022, Canady defeated Phillip Walker in the Republican primary election for the 50th district. No Democratic candidate was nominated to challenge her in the general election. She succeeded Rene Plasencia.
