= Hartley Hendrick Hethcox =

American politician

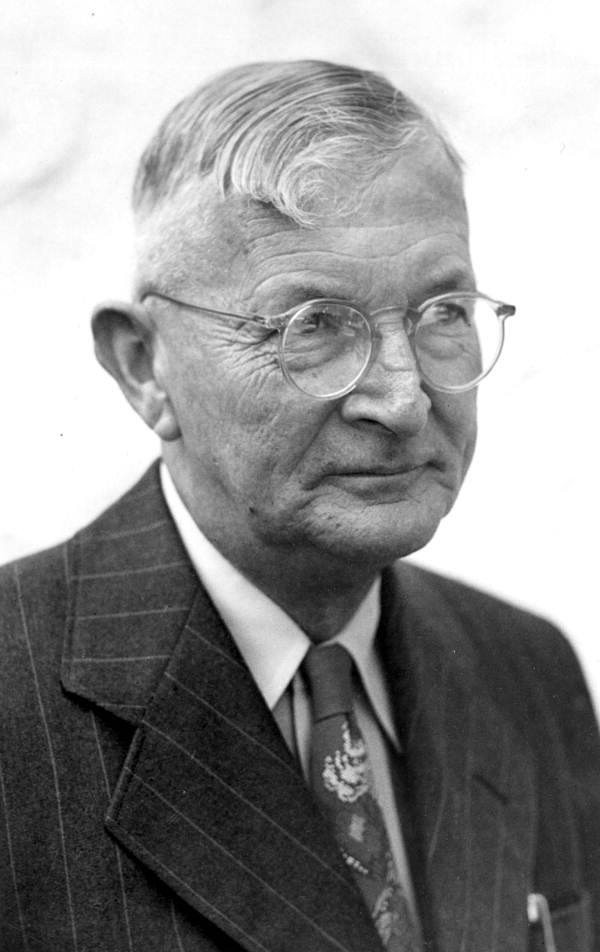
- Hethcox in 1947

Member of the Florida House of Representatives
- In office 1947 – 1949

Personal details
- Born: April 17, 1895 Paisley, Florida, U.S.
- Died: May 6, 1958 (aged 63) Eustis, Florida, U.S.
- Party: Democratic

Hartley Hendrick Hethcox (April 17, 1895 – May 6, 1958) was an American politician in the state of Florida.

Hethcox was born on April 17, 1895, in Paisley, Florida. He settled in Umatilla and became a melon farmer. He became involved in local politics serving ten years each as a city councilor in Umatilla, and on the Lake County Commission, as well as twelve years as a trustee of a school. Hethcox served as a Democratic member of the Florida House of Representatives from 1947 to 1949. He died in Eustis, Florida, on May 6, 1958.
