= Barry Kutun =

American politician

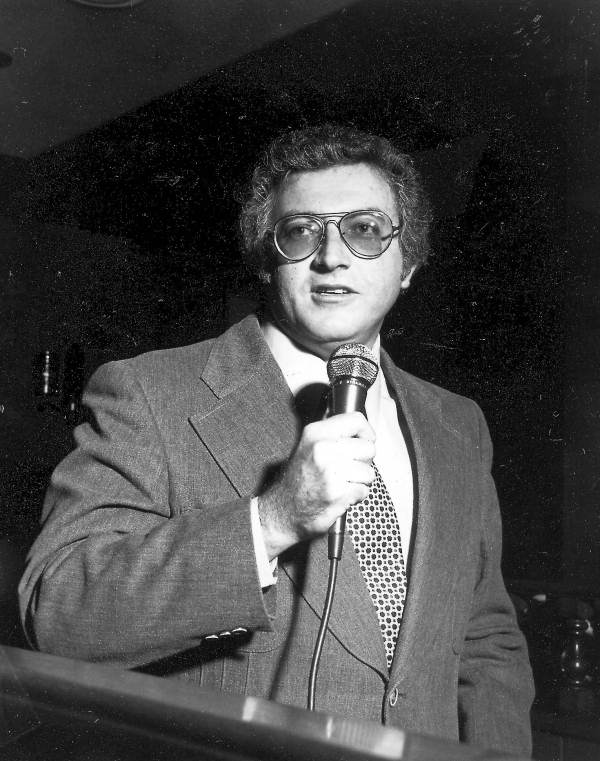
- Barry Kutun in the 1970s

Member of the Florida House of Representatives for the 99th district
- In office 1973–1982

Member of the Florida House of Representatives from the 104th district
- In office 1983–1986

Personal details
- Born: August 30, 1941 (age 84) The Bronx, New York City, New York
- Party: Democratic
- Occupation: Attorney, business broker

Barry Kutun (born August 30, 1941) was an American politician in the state of Florida.

Kutun was born in New York City and moved to Florida in 1943, attending the University of Florida and University of Miami School of Law. Kutun served in the Florida House of Representatives from 1973 to 1982 representing the 99th district, and from 1983 to 1986, representing the 104th district. Kutun was a Democrat at the time.
