= Dan McDow =

Dan McDow is a state legislator in Florida. He was elected to the Florida House of Representatives in November 2026. A Democrat, he narrowly beat incumbent Republican candidate Monique Miller. He represents Palm Bay, Florida and West Melbourne, Florida in Brevard County, Florida.

He was born in Chicago. He attended Lakeview High School and Lincoln International Business School.

McDow represents Florida House District 33. He served in West Melbourne's city council.

== See also ==
- 2024 United States House of Representatives elections in Florida
