= Joe Saunders (politician) =

American politician (born 1983)

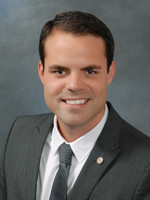

Member of the Florida House of Representatives from the 49th district
- In office November 6, 2012 – November 4, 2014
- Preceded by: Redistricted
- Succeeded by: Rene Plasencia

Personal details
- Born: April 12, 1983 (age 43) Fort Lauderdale, Florida, U.S.
- Party: Democratic
- Education: University of Central Florida (BA)
- Profession: Community organizer

Joseph Saunders (born April 12, 1983) is an American community activist and politician. He was a Democratic member of the Florida House of Representatives, representing the 49th District, including northern Orange County and the main campus of the University of Central Florida, from 2012 to 2014.

== History ==
Saunders was born in Fort Lauderdale and attended the University of Central Florida, from which he graduated with a degree in political science in 2005. While in his undergraduate career, he was active on campus, serving as the President of the Gay, Lesbian, Bisexual Student Union and the co-chair of the UCF Progressive Council. Upon graduation, Saunders took a job as a field organizer with Equality Florida, an LGBT rights organizations. From 2005 - 2015 Saunders held senior level positions at the organization including Statewide Field Director, Director of Civic Engagement and program director of Equality Means Business, the country's first state-level corporate equality coalition.

== Florida House of Representatives ==
Following the reconfiguration of state legislative districts in 2012, the 49th District was created, centered around the University of Central Florida campus, and Saunders ran in the open seat. In the Democratic primary, he easily defeated Shayan Elahi, winning the nomination of his party with 65% of the vote. Advancing to the general election, Saunders faced Marco Peña, a development officer for Florida Hospital and the Republican nominee. During the campaign, the Republican Party of Florida targeted the district, referring to Saunders as "Special Interest Joe" due to his work with Equality Florida and claiming that he was "new to the neighborhood," to which Saunders responded by noting that "he has lived in Orlando for more than a decade and attended UCF at the same time as Peña." The Orlando Sentinel endorsed Peña over Saunders, noting that voters had to choose between "two smart, successful candidates" and praising Saunders as a candidate who "knows state issues and has good ideas about many of them," but eventually recommending Peña. In the end, Saunders defeated Peña by a fairly wide margin, winning his first term in the legislature with 56% of the vote.

Along with fellow State Representative David Richardson, Saunders is the first openly gay member of the Florida state legislature.

As a freshman legislator, in 2012 Saunders was tapped to serve in leadership as a Deputy Whip for the House Democratic Caucus. In 2013 Saunders achieved an additional milestone when Democratic leadership selected him to serve as the ranking Democratic member of the House Choice and Innovation Education Subcommittee - the only freshman Democrat to serve as a ranking committee leader in the 2012-2014 term.

In his first and only term, Saunders would emerge as a leading advocate for public education and a harsh critic of policies that divert public school dollars into private or for-profit schools like vouchers and charter schools Saunders would eventually receive numerous awards and recognitions for his work in early childhood education, K-12 education and higher education policy including leadership awards from the Florida Alliance for Arts Education, a "Freshman Lawmaker of the Year" award from the Florida Education Association and the 2014 Leadership Award from the Florida Association of Early Learning Coalitions for his work to update the health and safety standards of early childhood education providers.

== 2014 election ==
In November 2014, Democrats suffered a wave of losses in Central Florida. In a surprise upset, Saunders was narrowly defeated in his reelection campaign by Republican activist and local high school track Rene "Coach P" Plasencia. Plasencia earned 19,119 votes to 18,405 for Saunders, taking the seat by a 714-vote margin and 51% of the voting electorate.

== Post-office ==
In December 2014, Saunders joined the staff of the Human Rights Campaign, the country's largest LGBTQ rights group, as the Southern Regional Field Director.

In 2017, following the Brexit referendum, United Kingdom Prime Minister Theresa May called a snap election for all seats in the United Kingdom's Parliament. In May 2017, Saunders joined the campaign of openly gay Liberal Democrat and former Minister of State Simon Hughes. A former member of Parliament for over twenty years, Hughes had lost reelection to the South Central London seat in 2015 by Labour party activist Neil Coyle.

Saunders currently serves as the Senior Political Director of Equality Florida where he manages the organization's legislative, civic engagement and electoral programs.

Since returning to Equality Florida he has held campaign positions in high-profile campaigns including the re-election campaign of St. Peterburg Mayor Rick Kriseman, the historic election of Fort Lauderdale's first LGBTQ Mayor Dean Trantalis, the successful effort to unseat anti-LGBTQ incumbent Florida State Senator Daphne Campbell and Anna Eskamani's 2018 campaign for Florida House District 47.
