= Florida's 50th House of Representatives district =

Florida district

Florida's 50th State House of Representatives district
Representative
Jennifer Canady; R–Lakeland

Florida's 50th House of Representatives district elects one member of the Florida House of Representatives. It covers parts of Polk County.

== Members ==
- Kim Berfield (2000–2006)
- Ed Hooper (2006–2012)
- Tom Goodson (2012–2016)
- Rene Plasencia (2016–2022)
- Jennifer Canady (since 2022)
