= C. A. Roberts =

American politician

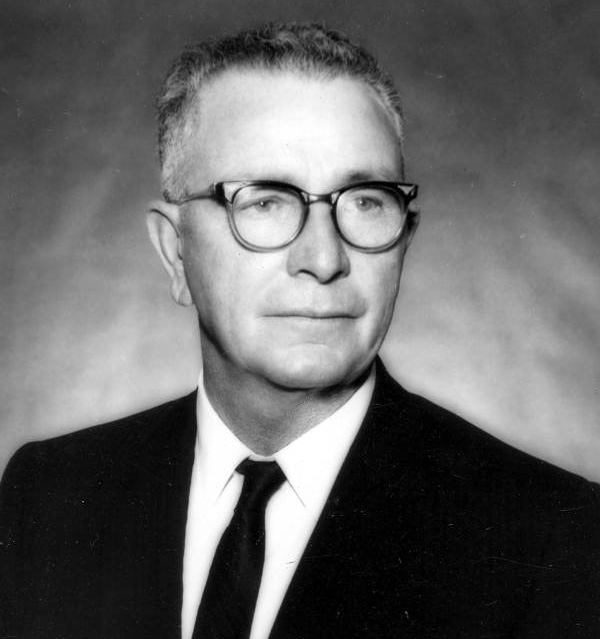

Member of the Florida House of Representatives from the Union County district
- In office 1950–1952; 1956–1965

Personal details
- Born: November 5, 1903 Lake Butler, Florida
- Died: December 21, 1973 (aged 70) Gainesville, Florida
- Party: Democratic
- Spouse(s): Gertrude Ann Wynn; Marjorie Mizelle Lascola
- Children: Elizabeth Ann; Barbara Jean; William Van; Avery Clarence

Clarence Abram Roberts (November 5, 1903 – December 21, 1973), known as C. A. Roberts, was a Florida state legislator. He served in the Florida House of Representatives on multiple occasions for Union County. He was also a noted pecan farmer, cattle rancher, timberland owner and naval stores operator. He was a lifelong resident of Lake Butler, Florida.

== Biography ==
Roberts was born to Charles Abram Roberts and Lucretia M. Nettle. He was educated in county public schools and worked as a prison manager and a livestock inspector in the 1920s.

Union County, where Roberts resided, became the 61st county of Florida by a legislative act on May 20, 1921. Roberts was one of six delegates elected to attend the convention at which the first county officers were nominated. Roberts was named to the first Board of Union County Commissioners for District 1 in 1921. From 1934 to 1938, Roberts served on the Lake Butler City Council. He again served on the Board of County Commissioners, and was chair from 1940 to 1948.

In 1950 he ran successfully on the Democratic Party ticket for a seat in the Florida House of Representatives, representing Union County. He served two sessions until 1952. He was elected again in 1956 and re-elected in 1960, serving until 1965.

== Other activities ==
Roberts became president of the Imperial Ranch and Tung Corporation in 1952. He was appointed to Florida Forestry Board in 1952 by Governor Fuller Warren, serving until 1956, when he assumed the board presidency. He was also active in many community associations, including the Chamber of Commerce, Masons, Rotary Club, and American Turpentine Farmers Association Board.

== Personal ==
He married Gertrude Ann Wynn in August 1928. They had two daughters and a son. After her death in 1961, he remarried to Marjorie Mizelle Lascola (d. 2010), who survived him. They had one son, named Avery. Roberts died at Gainesville, Florida in 1973 and was interred at Dekle Cemetery in Lake Butler alongside his first wife, Gertrude.
