= Florida's 37th House of Representatives district =

Florida district

Florida's 37th State House of Representatives district
Representative
| Susan Plasencia; R–Orlando |

Florida's 37th House of Representatives district elects one member of the Florida House of Representatives. It covers parts of Orange County and Seminole County.

== Members ==
- Susan Plasencia (since 2022)
