= Florida's 49th House of Representatives district =

Florida district

Florida's 49th State House of Representatives district
Representative
Jennifer Kincart Jonsson; R–Fort Meade

Florida's 49th House of Representatives district elects one member of the Florida House of Representatives. It covers parts of Polk County.

== Members ==
- Melony Bell (2018–2024)
- Jennifer Kincart Jonsson (since 2024)
