= Florida House of Representatives =

Lower house of the Florida Legislature

- 2026–2028 session

Type
- Type: Lower house
- Term limits: 4 consecutive terms (8 years)

History
- Founded: May 26, 1843
- Preceded by: Legislative Council of the Territory of Florida
- New session started: March 2, 2027; 3 months' time

Leadership
- Speaker: Sam Garrison (R) since November 17, 2026
- Speaker pro tempore: Demi Busatta (R) since November 17, 2026
- Majority Leader: Randy Maggard (R) since November 17, 2026
- Minority Leader: Christine Hunschofsky (D) since November 17, 2026

Structure
- Seats: 120
- Political groups: Majority: Republican (70); Minority: Democratic (50)
- Length of term: 2 years
- Authority: Article III, Constitution of Florida
- Salary: $18,000/year + per diem (Subsistence & Travel)

Elections
- Last election: November 5, 2026
- Next election: November 7, 2028
- Redistricting: Legislative control

Motto
- In God We Trust

Meeting place
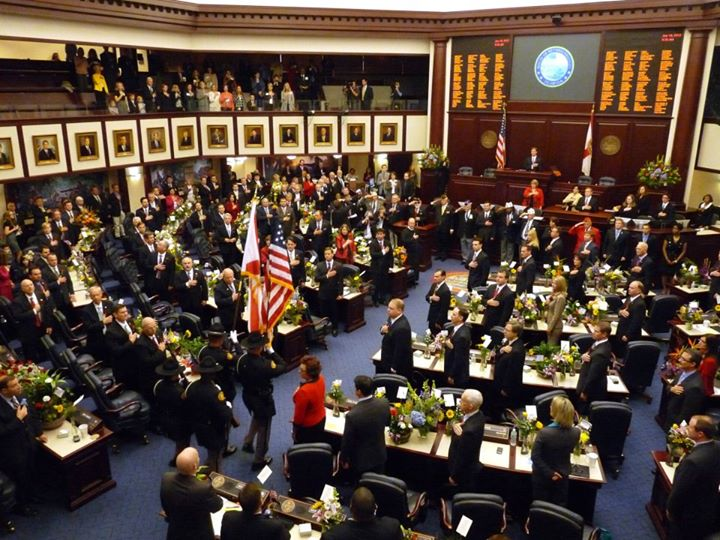
- House of Representatives Chamber; Florida Capitol; Tallahassee, Florida

Website
- Florida House of Representatives

Rules
- Florida House of Representatives Rules

House Office Building at the State Capitol

The Florida House of Representatives is the lower house of the Florida Legislature, the state legislature of the U.S. state of Florida, the Florida Senate being the upper house. Article III, Section 1 of the Constitution of Florida, adopted in 1968, defines the role of the Legislature and how it is to be constituted. The House is composed of 120 members, each elected from a single-member district with a population of approximately 180,000 residents. Legislative districts are drawn on the basis of population figures, provided by the federal decennial census. Representatives' terms begin immediately upon their election.

The Republicans holds a majority in the State House with 70 seats; Democrats are in the minority with 50 seats.

== Term limits ==
House members are limited to four consecutive terms. In recent years in the Republican majority caucus, each entering class of House members elects a "speaker-designate" from the class whom the caucus as a whole commits to supporting as Speaker in six years time.

== Qualifications ==
Florida legislators must be at least twenty-one years old, an elector and resident of their district, and must have resided in Florida for at least two years prior to election.

== Legislative session ==
Each year during which the Legislature meets constitutes a new legislative session.

=== Regular legislative session ===
The Florida Legislature meets in a 60-day regular legislative session each year. Regular legislative sessions in odd-numbered years must begin on the first Tuesday after the first Monday in March. Under the state Constitution, the Legislature can begin even-numbered year regular legislative sessions at a time of its choosing.

=== Special session ===
Special legislative sessions may be called by the governor, by a joint proclamation of the Senate president and House speaker, or by a three-fifths vote of all legislators. During any special session the Legislature may only address legislative business that is within the purview of the purpose or purposes stated in the special session proclamation.

== Powers and process ==
=== Leadership ===
Position	Name	Party	District
Speaker of the House	Sam Garrison	Republican	11
Speaker pro tempore	Demi Busatta	Republican	114
Majority leader	Randy Maggard	Republican	54
Minority leader	Christine Hunschofsky	Democratic	95

== Composition ==
Affiliation	Party (Shading indicates majority caucus)		Total	Vacant
Affiliation	Republican	Democratic	Total	Vacant
End of 2022-24 legislature	83	36	119	1
Start of previous (2024–26) legislature	85	35	120	0
End of previous legislature	82	34	116	4
Start of current (2026–28) legislature	70	50	120	0
Latest voting share	58.3%	41.7%		

== Members, 2026–2028 ==
District	Member	Party	Residence	Counties represented	First elected	Term-limited
1	Michelle Salzman	Republican	Pensacola	Part of Escambia	2020	2028
2	Jon Fay	Republican	Pensacola	Parts of Escambia and Santa Rosa	2026	2034
3	Nathan Boyles	Republican	Holt	Parts of Santa Rosa and Okaloosa	2025*	2034
4	Patt Maney	Republican	Destin	Part of Okaloosa	2020	2028
5	Shane Abbott	Republican	DeFuniak Springs	Calhoun, Holmes, Jackson, Walton, Washington	2022	2030
6	Tricia Berry	Republican	Panama City	Bay	2026	2034
7	Jason Shoaf	Republican	Port St. Joe	Dixie, Franklin, Gulf, Hamilton, Lafayette, Liberty, Suwannee, Taylor, Wakulla, parts of Jefferson and Leon	2019*	2028
8	Gallop Franklin	Democratic	Tallahassee	Gadsden, part of Leon	2022	2030
9	Allison Tant	Democratic	Tallahassee	Madison, parts of Jefferson and Leon	2020	2028
10	Marshall Rawson	Republican	Hampton	Baker, Bradford, Columbia, Union, part of Alachua	2026	2034
11	Sam Garrison	Republican	Fleming Island	Part of Clay	2020	2028
12	Terrance Freeman	Republican	Jacksonville	Part of Duval	2026	2034
13	Audrey Gibson	Democratic	Jacksonville	Part of Duval	2026, 2002–10	2034
14	Kimberly Daniels	Democratic	Jacksonville	Part of Duval	2022, 2016–20	2030
15	Dean Black	Republican	Jacksonville	Nassau, part of Duval	2022	2030
16	Kiyan Michael	Republican	Jacksonville	Part of Duval	2022	2030
17	Jessica Baker	Republican	Orange Park	Part of Duval	2022	2030
18	Kim Kendall	Republican	St. Augustine	Part of St. Johns	2024	2032
19	Sam Greco	Republican	St. Augustine	Flagler, part of St. Johns	2024	2032
20	Judson Sapp	Republican	Palatka	Putnam, parts of Clay, Marion and St. Johns	2024	2032
21	Jacquelyn Randall	Democratic	Hawthorne	Parts of Alachua and Marion	2026	2034
22	Amy Trask	Democratic	Gainesville	Gilchrist, Levy, part of Alachua	2026	2034
23	J.J. Grow	Republican	Lecanto	Citrus, part of Marion	2024	2032
24	Ryan Chamberlin	Republican	Belleview	Part of Marion	2023*	2032
25	Taylor Yarkosky	Republican	Clermont	Part of Lake	2022	2030
26	Nan Cobb	Republican	Tavares	Part of Lake	2024	2032
27	Richard Gentry	Republican	Ocala	Parts of Lake, Marion and Volusia	2024	2032
28	Bill Partington	Republican	Ormond Beach	Part of Volusia	2024	2032
29	Webster Barnaby	Republican	Deltona	Part of Volusia	2020	2028
30	Chase Tramont	Republican	Port Orange	Parts of Brevard and Volusia	2022	2030
31	Matt Woodside	Republican	Merritt Island	Part of Brevard	2026	2034
32	Brian Hodgers	Republican	Melbourne	Part of Brevard	2025*	2034
33	Dan McDow	Democratic	Palm Bay	Part of Brevard	2026	2034
34	Robbie Brackett	Republican	Vero Beach	Indian River, part of Brevard	2022	2030
35	Eric Gray	Democratic	Orlando	Parts of Orange and Osceola	2026	2034
36	Darryl Block	Democratic	Sanford	Part of Seminole	2026	2034
37	Jane Aman	Democratic	Orlando	Parts of Orange and Seminole	2026	2034
38	Nik Dean	Democratic	Maitland	Part of Seminole	2026	2034
39	Jarod Fox	Democratic	Winter Garden	Parts of Orange and Seminole	2026	2034
40	RaShon Young	Democratic	Orlando	Part of Orange	2025*	2034
41	Bruce Antone	Democratic	Orlando	Part of Orange	2022, 2012–20, 2002–06	2030
42	Felipe Sousa Lazaballet	Democratic	Orlando	Part of Orange	2026	2034
43	Samuel Vilchez Santiago	Democratic	Orlando	Part of Orange	2026	2034
44	Rita Harris	Democratic	Orlando	Part of Orange	2022	2030
45	Leonard Spencer	Democratic	Gotha	Parts of Orange and Osceola	2024	2032
46	Jose Alvarez	Democratic	Kissimmee	Part of Osceola	2024	2032
47	Anthony Nieves	Democratic	Kissimmee	Parts of Orange and Osceola	2026	2034
48	Jon Albert	Republican	Winter Haven	Part of Polk	2024	2032
49	Jennifer Kincart Jonsson	Republican	Fort Meade	Part of Polk	2024	2032
50	Jennifer Canady	Republican	Lakeland	Part of Polk	2022	2030
51	Octavio Hernandez	Democratic	Davenport	Part of Polk	2026	2034
52	Samantha Scott	Republican	Bushnell	Sumter, part of Hernando	2026*	2034
53	Brian Hawkins	Republican	Spring Hill	Parts of Hernando and Pasco	2026	2034
54	Randy Maggard	Republican	Zephyrhills	Part of Pasco	2019*	2028
55	Walter Price	Republican	Lutz	Part of Pasco	2026	2034
56	Brad Yeager	Republican	New Port Richey	Part of Pasco	2022	2030
57	Adam Anderson	Republican	Palm Harbor	Part of Pinellas	2022	2030
58	Kim Berfield	Republican	Clearwater	Part of Pinellas	2022, 2000–06	2030
59	Berny Jacques	Republican	Seminole	Part of Pinellas	2022	2030
60	Lindsay Polega-Quigley	Democratic	St. Petersburg	Part of Pinellas	2026	2034
61	Linda Chaney	Republican	St. Pete Beach	Parts of Pinellas and Hillsborough (unpopulated)	2020	2028
62	Kyandra Darling	Democratic	St. Petersburg	Parts of Hillsborough and Pinellas	2026	2034
63	Jacqueline Coffie-Leeks	Democratic	Tampa	Part of Hillsborough	2026	2034
64	Luis Salazar	Democratic	Tampa	Part of Hillsborough	2026	2034
65	Karen Gonzalez Pittman	Republican	Tampa	Part of Hillsborough	2022	2030
66	Traci Koster	Republican	Tampa	Part of Hillsborough	2020	2028
67	Luis Viera	Democratic	Tampa	Part of Hillsborough	2026	2034
68	Ryan Gill	Republican	Plant City	Part of Hillsborough	2026	2034
69	Ashley Herrmann	Democratic	Brandon	Part of Hillsborough	2026	2034
70	Michael Owen	Republican	Lithia	Parts of Hillsborough and Manatee	2024	2032
71	Jordan Varnadore	Republican	Palmetto	Part of Manatee	2026	2034
72	Bill Conerly	Republican	Lakewood Ranch	Part of Manatee	2024	2032
73	Fiona McFarland	Republican	Sarasota	Part of Sarasota	2020	2028
74	Nick Pachota	Republican	Venice	Part of Sarasota	2026	2034
75	Danny Nix	Republican	Port Charlotte	Parts of Charlotte and Sarasota	2024	2032
76	Vanessa Oliver	Republican	North Fort Myers	DeSoto, parts of Charlotte and Lee	2024	2032
77	Tiffany Esposito	Republican	Fort Myers	Part of Lee	2022	2030
78	Susan Frantz	Republican	Fort Myers	Part of Lee	2026	2034
79	Mike Giallombardo	Republican	Cape Coral	Part of Lee	2020	2028
80	Adam Botana	Republican	Bonita Springs	Parts of Collier and Lee	2020	2028
81	Yvette Benarroch	Republican	Naples	Part of Collier	2024	2032
82	Liesa Priddy	Republican	Immokalee	Hendry, part of Collier	2026	2034
83	Kaylee Tuck	Republican	Sebring	Glades, Hardee, Highlands, Okeechobee	2020	2028
84	Dana Trabulsy	Republican	Fort Pierce	Part of St. Lucie	2020	2028
85	Anthony Bonna	Republican	Port St. Lucie	Parts of Martin and St. Lucie	2026	2034
86	John Snyder	Republican	Stuart	Parts of Martin and Palm Beach	2020	2028
87	Jon Maples	Republican	Jupiter	Part of Palm Beach	2026	2034
88	Jervonte Edmonds	Democratic	West Palm Beach	Part of Palm Beach	2022*	2030
89	Debra Tendrich	Democratic	West Palm Beach	Part of Palm Beach	2024	2032
90	Rob Long	Democratic	Delray Beach	Part of Palm Beach	2025*	2034
91	Peggy Gossett-Seidman	Republican	Highland Beach	Part of Palm Beach	2022	2030
92	Kelly Skidmore	Democratic	Boca Raton	Part of Palm Beach	2020, 2006–10,	2028
93	August Mangeney	Democratic	Lake Worth Beach	Part of Palm Beach	2026	2034
94	Elizabeth Holmes	Democratic	Palm Beach	Part of Palm Beach	2026	2034
95	Christine Hunschofsky	Democratic	Parkland	Part of Broward	2020	2028
96	Dan Daley	Democratic	Coral Springs	Part of Broward	2019*	2028
97	Lisa Dunkley	Democratic	Sunrise	Part of Broward	2022	2030
98	Mitch Rosenwald	Democratic	Lauderdale Lakes	Part of Broward	2024	2032
99	Daryl Campbell	Democratic	Fort Lauderdale	Part of Broward	2022*	2030
100	Michael Ferguson	Democratic	Lauderdale-by-the-Sea	Part of Broward	2026	2034
101	Todd Delmay	Democratic	Hollywood	Part of Broward	2026	2034
102	Mike Friend	Democratic	Davie	Part of Broward	2026	2034
103	Robin Bartleman	Democratic	Weston	Part of Broward	2020	2028
104	Felicia Robinson	Democratic	Miami Gardens	Parts of Broward and Miami-Dade	2020	2028
105	Marie Woodson	Democratic	Hollywood	Part of Broward	2020	2028
106	Lucia Baez-Geller	Democratic	Miami Beach	Part of Miami-Dade	2026	2034
107	Wallace Aristide	Democratic	Miami Gardens	Part of Miami-Dade	2024	2032
108	Daphne Campbell	Democratic	Miami Shores	Part of Miami-Dade	2026, 2010–16	2034
109	Ashley Gantt	Democratic	Miami	Part of Miami-Dade	2022	2030
110	Tom Fabricio	Republican	Miami Lakes	Part of Miami-Dade	2020	2028
111	David Borrero	Republican	Sweetwater	Part of Miami-Dade	2020	2028
112	Alex Rizo	Republican	Hialeah	Part of Miami-Dade	2020	2028
113	Gloria Romero Roses	Democratic	Miami	Part of Miami-Dade	2026	2034
114	Demi Busatta	Republican	Coral Gables	Part of Miami-Dade	2020	2028
115	Omar Blanco	Republican	Miami	Part of Miami-Dade	2024	2032
116	Ashley Perez-Biliskov	Republican	Miami	Part of Miami-Dade	2026	2034
117	Kevin Chambliss	Democratic	Florida City	Part of Miami-Dade	2020	2028
118	Mike Redondo	Republican	Miami	Part of Miami-Dade	2023*	2032
119	Juan Carlos Porras	Republican	Miami	Part of Miami-Dade	2022	2030
120	Jim Mooney	Republican	Islamorada	Monroe and part of Miami-Dade	2020	2028

*Elected in a special election.

== District map ==
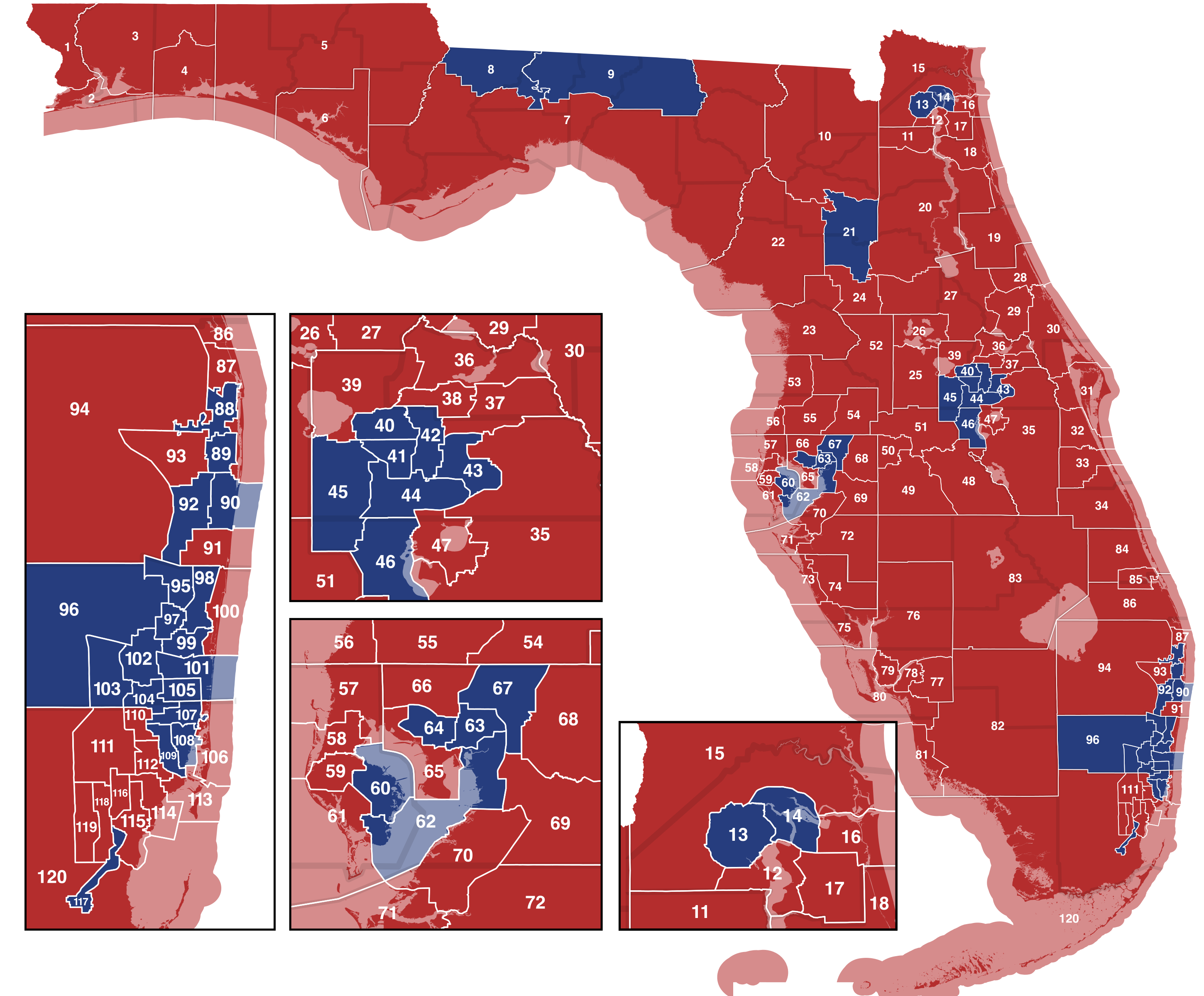
Districts and party composition of the Florida House of Representatives following the 2026 elections Republican Party (70) Democratic Party (50)

== Past composition of the House of Representatives ==
From 1874 to 1996, the Democratic Party held majorities in the Florida House of Representatives. Following sizable GOP gains in the 1994 election, which significantly reduced the Democratic Party majority in the Florida House, Republicans captured a majority in the 1996 election. The Republican Party has been the majority party since that time in the House.

Additional information on the past composition of the Florida House of Representatives can be found in Allen Morris's The Florida Handbook (various years, published every two years for many years).

== Notable former members ==
- Theodore Bissell, first member expelled from the Florida House
- Howell Lancaster (1911–1972), leader of the Pork Chop Gang
- Bert Riddle (1893–1979), expelled member of the Florida House
- C. A. Roberts (1903–1973), Lake Butler City Council member and first commissioner elected to the Board of Union County, Florida
- F. Eugene Tubbs (1935–1978), co-creator of Gatorade

== See also ==
- Florida Democratic Party
- Elections in Florida
- Florida State Capitol
- Government of Florida
- List of speakers of the Florida House of Representatives
- List of Florida state legislatures
- Republican Party of Florida
- The Florida Channel
