= 2026 United States House of Representatives elections in Florida =

- November 3, 2026

All 28 Florida seats to the United States House of Representatives
	Majority party	Minority party
Party	Republican	Democratic
Last election	20	8
Seats won	20	8
Seat change	Steady	Steady
Popular vote	4,041,654	3,867,145
Percentage	50.50%	48.32%
Swing	▼7.36%	▲6.30%

Republican:
40–50%
50–60%
60–70%
70–80%
80–90%
Democratic:
40–50%
50–60%
60–70%
70–80%
80–90%
90–100%

The 2026 United States House of Representatives elections in Florida were held on November 3, 2026, to elect the 28 U.S. representatives from the State of Florida, one from each of the state's congressional districts. The elections coincided with other elections to the House of Representatives, elections to the United States Senate, and various state and local elections. Primary elections took place on August 18, 2026.

== Redistricting ==
Map of Florida's congressional districts as passed by the Florida Legislature on April 29, 2026, which will be in use at the 2026 elections pending legal challenges Interactive map version

On April 29, 2026, the Florida House of Representatives and State Senate passed a new congressional district map proposed by Governor Ron DeSantis during a special legislative session. The map, which took effect for the 2026 elections, was expected to result in a 24–4 Republican–Democratic split among the state's 28 congressional districts. Governor DeSantis signed the redistricting map into law on May 4. The map is being challenged in court on the basis that it violates the Fair Districts Amendment to the state constitution that passed in 2010, which prohibits an explicitly partisan map. On May 26, a judge ruled that the new map would stay in effect for the 2026 elections.

== Statewide polling ==
=== Statewide congressional polls ===
Poll source	Date(s) administered	Sample size (Note: Key: A – all adults RV – registered voters LV – likely voters V – unclear)	Margin of error	Republican	Democratic	Other	Undecided
Big Data Poll	October 26–30, 2026	1,067 (LV)	± 3.0%	48%	44%	2% (Note: "Someone else/third party" with 2%)	6%
Big Data Poll	October 26–30, 2026	1,067 (LV)	± 3.0%	49% (Note: With voters who lean towards a given candidate)	46%	5% (Note: "Someone else/third party" with 5%)	–
Big Data Poll	October 26–30, 2026	1,122 (RV)	± 3.0%	46%	43%	3% (Note: "Someone else/third party" with 3%)	8%
Big Data Poll	October 26–30, 2026	1,122 (RV)	± 3.0%	48%	45%	7% (Note: "Someone else/third party" with 7%)	–
The New York Times/Siena University	October 19–25, 2026	813 (LV)	± 3.9%	47%	42%	1% (Note: "The third-party candidate" with 1%)	10%
Univision/YouGov	October 2–15, 2026	825 (LV)	± 4.0%	49%	44%	1% (Note: "Other candidate" with 1%)	6%

== District 1 ==
2026 Florida's 1st congressional district election
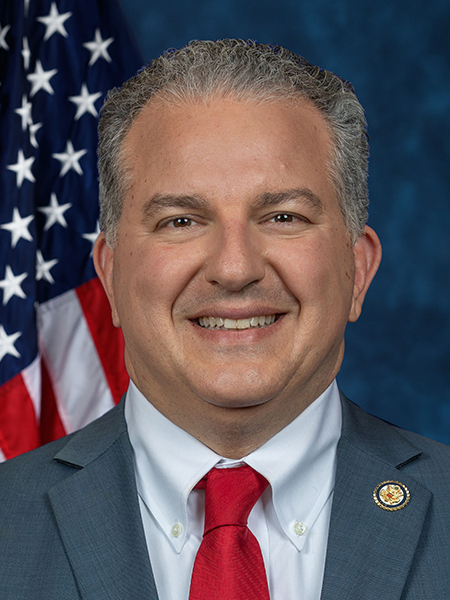

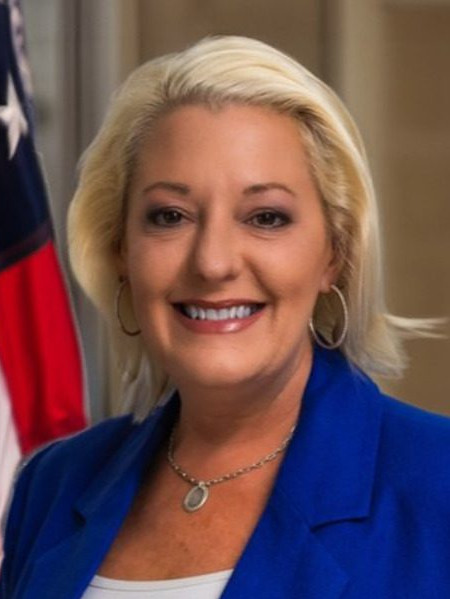
Nominee	Jimmy Patronis	Gay Valimont
Party	Republican	Democratic
Popular vote	181,972	103,812
Percentage	62.51%	35.66%
- County results Patronis: 50–60% 60–70% 70–80%
U.S. Representative before election
Jimmy Patronis
Republican
Elected U.S. Representative
Jimmy Patronis
Republican

Florida's 1st congressional district boundary from the 2026 elections Interactive map version

The incumbent representative is Jimmy Patronis, who assumed office on April 2, 2025, after winning the special election that occurred as a result of the resignation of Matt Gaetz on November 13, 2024.

=== Republican primary ===
==== Nominee ====
- Jimmy Patronis, incumbent U.S. representative

==== Eliminated in primary ====
- Douglas C. Chico, Navy veteran
- John Frankman, Army veteran

==== Endorsements ====
John Frankman

Organizations

- Republican Liberty Caucus
Jimmy Patronis

Executive branch officials

- Donald Trump, president of the United States (2017–2021, 2025–present)

Organizations

- AIPAC
- National Rifle Association Political Victory Fund

==== Fundraising ====
Campaign finance reports as of July 29, 2026
Candidate	Raised	Spent	Cash on hand
Douglas Chico (R)	$84,387 (Note: $45,500 was self funded)	$73,530	$10,857
John Frankman (R)	$128,494 (Note: $51,916 was self funded)	$66,173	$62,322
Jimmy Patronis (R)	$3,789,738	$2,854,437	$935,302
Source: Federal Election Commission

==== Results ====
Republican primary results
Party	Candidate	Votes	%
Republican	Jimmy Patronis (incumbent)	62,965	71.1
Republican	John Frankman	17,278	19.5
Republican	Douglas C. Chico	8,286	9.4
Total votes		88,529	100.0

=== Democratic primary ===
==== Nominee ====
- Gay Valimont, athletic trainer and nominee for this district in 2024 and 2025

==== Withdrawn ====
- Henry Barnes

==== Endorsements ====
Gay Valimont

Organizations

- Democratic Progressive Caucus of Florida
- National Women's Political Caucus

==== Fundraising ====
Campaign finance reports as of July 29, 2026
Candidate	Raised	Spent	Cash on hand
Gay Valimont (D)	$174,309	$152,495	$21,814
Source: Federal Election Commission

=== Independents ===
- Tyler Davis

=== General election ===
==== Predictions ====
Source	Ranking	As of
Decision Desk HQ	Safe R	July 14, 2026
The Cook Political Report	Solid R	February 6, 2025
Inside Elections	Solid R	May 5, 2026
Sabato's Crystal Ball	Safe R	April 10, 2025
The Economist	Safe R	May 6, 2026

==== Post-primary endorsements ====
Gay Valimont (D)

Organizations

- Progressive Democrats of America

==== Fundraising ====
Campaign finance reports as of October 14, 2026
Candidate	Raised	Spent	Cash on hand
Jimmy Patronis (R)	$4,467,313	$3,527,838	$939,474
Gay Valimont (D)	$295,714	$260,991	$34,723
Source: Federal Election Commission

==== Results ====
2026 Florida's 1st congressional district election
Party	Candidate	Votes	%	±%
Republican	Jimmy Patronis (incumbent)	181,944	62.5%	
Democratic	Gay Valimont	103,729	35.6%	
Independent	Tyler Davis	5,337	1.8%	
Total votes		291,010	100%	

== District 2 ==
2026 Florida's 2nd congressional district election

Nominee	Austin Rogers	Amanda Green
Party	Republican	Democratic
Popular vote	161,191	148,322
Percentage	52.08%	47.92%
- County results Rogers: 50–60% 60–70% 70–80% 80–90% Green: 60–70% 70–80%
U.S. Representative before election
Neal Dunn
Republican
Elected U.S. Representative
Austin Rogers
Republican

Florida's 2nd congressional district boundary from the 2026 elections Interactive map version

The incumbent is Republican Neal Dunn, who was re-elected with 61.6% of the vote in 2024. On January 13, 2026, Dunn announced that he would not run for re-election.

=== Republican primary ===
==== Nominee ====
- Austin Rogers, former general counsel to U.S. Senator Rick Scott

==== Eliminated in primary ====
- Keith Gross, former assistant state attorney for Florida's 18th circuit court, candidate for U.S. Senate in 2024, and Democratic candidate for Georgia's 80th House of Representatives district in 2010
- Lee Jones, pilot
- Nick Lewis, small business owner
- Luke Murphy, retired U.S. Army sergeant and Purple Heart recipient
- Jim Norton, Gulf County school superintendent and former field representative for U.S. representative Allen Boyd
- Evan Power, chair of the Republican Party of Florida (2024–present)
- Audie Rowell, retired Walton County chief sheriff's deputy

==== Declined ====
- Alex Bruesewitz, political consultant
- Neal Dunn, incumbent U.S. representative
- Jimmy Patronis, incumbent U.S. representative from the 1st district (running for re-election)
- Chuck Perdue, Bay County tax collector
- Jason Shoaf, state representative from the 7th district (running for re-election)
- A.J. Smith, Franklin County sheriff and Democratic candidate for Florida's 7th House of Representatives district in 2012

==== Endorsements ====
Keith Gross

U.S. representatives

- Dan Burton, former IN-05 (1983–2013)
- Steve Buyer, former IN-04 (1993–2011)
- Sam Graves, MO-06 (2001–present)
- Greg Laughlin, former TX-14 (1989–1997)
- David Rivera, former FL-25 (2011–2013)
- Pete Sessions, TX-17 (1997–2019, 2021–present)
- John E. Sweeney, former NY-20 (1999–2007)

Organizations

- Log Cabin Republicans
- Republican Liberty Caucus
Evan Power

U.S. representatives

- Aaron Bean, FL-04 (2023–present)
- Vern Buchanan, FL-16 (2007–present)
- Kat Cammack, FL-03 (2021–present)
- Mario Díaz-Balart, FL-26 (2003–present)
- Randy Fine, FL-06 (2025–present)
- Mike Haridopolos, FL-08 (2025–present)
- Anna Paulina Luna, FL-13 (2023–present)
- Cory Mills, FL-07 (2023–present)
- John Rutherford, FL-05 (2017–present)

Statewide officials

- James Uthmeier, attorney general of Florida (2025–present)
Austin Rogers

U.S. representatives

- Tom Emmer, MN-06 (2015–present)
- Jim Jordan, OH-04 (2007–present)
- Guy Reschenthaler, PA-14 (2019–present)
- Steve Scalise, majority leader of the House of Representatives (2023–present) from LA-01 (2008–present)
- Greg Steube, FL-17 (2019–present)

State legislators

- Jay Trumbull, state senator from the 2nd district (2022–present)

Local officials

- Stuart Tettemer, Panama City Beach mayor
- Terry Nichols, Graceville mayor
- Dave Lowery, Lynn Haven mayor

Individuals

- Darryl Roberson, retired Air Force lieutenant general
Neal Dunn (declined)

Executive branch officials

- Donald Trump, president of the United States (2017–2021, 2025–present)

Organizations

- AIPAC

==== Fundraising ====
Campaign finance reports as of July 29, 2026
Candidate	Raised	Spent	Cash on hand
Keith Gross (R)	$12,325,575 (Note: $10,550,070 was self funded)	$11,329,071	$1,002,280
Lee Jones (R)	$52,800 (Note: $7,000 was self funded)	$27,310	$25,490
Nick Lewis (R)	$95,001 (Note: $94,000 was self funded)	$94,031	$970
Luke Murphy (R)	$280,410	$124,051	$156,358
Jim Norton (R)	$411,786	$400,388	$11,398
Evan Power (R)	$727,093 (Note: $150,000 was self funded)	$464,183	$262,909
Austin Rogers (R)	$1,010,277 (Note: $381,500 was self funded)	$623,248	$387,029
Audie Rowell (R)	$117,948	$90,724	$27,224
Source: Federal Election Commission

==== Debate ====
2026 Florida's 2nd congressional district Republican primary debate
No.	Date	Host	Moderator	Link	Republican	Republican	Republican	Republican	Republican	Republican
Key: P Participant A Absent N Not invited I Invited W Withdrawn										
Key: P Participant A Absent N Not invited I Invited W Withdrawn					Keith Gross	Luke Murphy	Jim Norton	Evan Power	Austin Rogers	Audie Rowell
1	May 18, 2026	Capital Tiger Bay Club	Jim Rosica		P	P	P	P	P	P

==== Polling ====
Poll source	Date(s) administered	Sample size	Margin of error	Keith Gross	Luke Murphy	Jim Norton	Evan Power	Austin Rogers	Others	Undecided
co/efficient (R) (Note: Poll sponsored by Panhandle Patriots PAC, which supports Rogers)	August 10–11, 2026	603 (LV)	± 4.0%	8%	13%	8%	15%	25%	5% (Note: Audie Rowell with 4%, Lee Jones with 1%)	26%
Victory Insights (R)	August 4–6, 2026	1,200 (LV) (Note: Poll was jointly conducted in five other districts, only the total LV is known)	–	16%	8%	10%	11%	21%	1% (Note: Audie Rowell with 1%, Lee Jones with 0%)	33%
Cygnal (R) (Note: Poll sponsored by Gross' campaign)	August 2026	–	± 4.9%	35%	7%	11%	11%	28%	3% (Note: Nick Lewis with 2%; Lee Jones with 1%)	5%
Guidant Polling and Strategy (Note: Poll sponsored by Rogers' campaign)	July 29–31, 2026	400 (LV)	± 4.9%	17%	5%	8%	9%	21%	3% (Note: Audie Rowell with 2%; Lee Jones with 1%)	38%
Patriot Polling (R)	January 16–24, 2026	812 (LV)	± 4.0%	34%	–	–	32%	–	–	34%

==== Results ====
Primary results by county: Rogers: 20–30%; 30–40%; 40–50%; Murphy: 20–30%; 30–40%; Norton: 20–30%; 30–40%; 40–50%; Rowell: 40–50%

Republican primary results
Party	Candidate	Votes	%
Republican	Austin Rogers	26,726	30.5
Republican	Keith Gross	14,381	16.4
Republican	Evan Power	13,842	15.8
Republican	Luke Murphy	13,461	15.3
Republican	Jim Norton	11,420	13.0
Republican	Audie Rowell	4,773	5.4
Republican	Lee Jones	1,821	2.1
Republican	Nick Lewis	1,281	1.5
Total votes		87,705	100.0

=== Democratic primary ===
==== Nominee ====
- Amanda Green, operations manager

==== Eliminated in primary ====
- Yen Bailey, lawyer and nominee for this district in 2024
- Brice Barnes, nonprofit founder
- Nic Zateslo, political technology consultant

==== Declined ====
- Loranne Ausley, former state senator from the 3rd district (2020–2022) (running for mayor of Tallahassee)
- Gwen Graham, former U.S. representative (2015–2017) and candidate for governor in 2018 (running for lieutenant governor)
- Al Lawson, former U.S. representative from Florida's 5th congressional district (2017–2023)

==== Endorsements ====
Yen Bailey

State legislators

- Gene Wu, minority leader of the Texas House of Representatives (2025–present) from the 137th district (2013–present)

Organizations

- Democratic Progressive Caucus of Florida (co-endorsement with Brice Barnes)
Brice Barnes

State legislators

- Shevrin Jones, state senator from the 34th district (2020–present)

Organizations

- Democratic Progressive Caucus of Florida (co-endorsement with Yen Bailey)
Amanda Green

U.S. representatives

- Allen Boyd, former FL-02 (1997–2011)

State legislators

- Daryl Jones, former state senator from the 40th district (1992–2002)

Local officials

- Walt McNeil, sheriff of Leon County

Labor unions

- Florida AFL-CIO
Nic Zateslo

Individuals

- Rick Wilson, political consultant and founder of The Lincoln Project (Independent)

==== Fundraising ====
Campaign finance reports as of July 29, 2026
Candidate	Raised	Spent	Cash on hand
Yen Bailey (D)	$177,869	$141,492	$51,848
Brice Barnes (D)	$317,996 (Note: $161,982 was self funded)	$240,837	$77,160
Amanda Green (D)	$348,120	$320,082	$28,038
Nic Zateslo (D)	$449,913 (Note: $137,518 was self funded)	$426,108	$23,624
Source: Federal Election Commission

==== Debate ====
2026 Florida's 2nd congressional district Democratic primary debate
No.	Date	Host	Moderator	Link	Democratic	Democratic	Democratic	Democratic
Key: P Participant A Absent N Not invited I Invited W Withdrawn								
Key: P Participant A Absent N Not invited I Invited W Withdrawn					Yen Bailey	Brice Barnes	Amanda Green	Nic Zateslo
1	Jul. 15, 2026	WJHG-TV	Jessica Foster	YouTube	P	P	P	P

==== Results ====
Primary results by county: Green: 30–40%; 40–50%; 70–80%; Bailey: 30–40%; Barnes: 40–50%

Democratic primary results
Party	Candidate	Votes	%
Democratic	Amanda Green	21,462	33.5
Democratic	Yen Bailey	17,924	28.0
Democratic	Brice Barnes	17,273	27.0
Democratic	Nicholas Zateslo	7,424	11.6
Total votes		64,083	100.0

=== General election ===
==== Predictions ====
Source	Ranking	As of
Decision Desk HQ	Likely R	July 14, 2026
The Cook Political Report	Solid R	February 6, 2025
Inside Elections	Solid R	May 5, 2026
Sabato's Crystal Ball	Safe R	April 10, 2025
The Economist	Likely R	May 6, 2026

==== Post-primary endorsements ====
Austin Rogers (R)

Executive branch officials

- Donald Trump, 45th and 47th president of the United States (2017–2021, 2025–present)

Statewide officials

- Ron DeSantis, governor of Florida (2019–present)

Organizations

- U.S. Chamber of Commerce
Amanda Green (D)

U.S. representatives

- Adam Gray, CA-13 (2025–present)
- Al Lawson, FL-05 (2017–2023)

State legislators

- Loranne Ausley, SD-03 (2020–2022)
- Gallop Franklin, HD-08 (2022–present)
- Allison Tant, HD-09 (2020–present)

Local officials

- John Dailey, mayor of Tallahassee (2018–present)
- Jeremy Matlow, Tallahassee city commissioner
- Curtis Richardson, Tallahassee city commissioner

Labor unions

- National Education Association
- United Auto Workers

Organizations

- Blue Dog PAC
- National Women's Political Caucus

==== Fundraising ====
Campaign finance reports as of October 14, 2026
Candidate	Raised	Spent	Cash on hand
Austin Rogers (R)	$1,359,852	$1,261,557	$98,295
Amanda Green (D)	$658,316	$630,178	$28,139
Source: Federal Election Commission

==== Polling ====
Hypothetical polling

Keith Gross vs. Yen Bailey

Poll source	Date(s) administered	Sample size	Margin of error	Keith Gross (R)	Yen Bailey (D)	Undecided
Patriot Polling (R)	July 22–26, 2026	922 (V)	± 3.0%	62%	35%	3%

Keith Gross vs. Brice Barnes

Poll source	Date(s) administered	Sample size	Margin of error	Keith Gross (R)	Brice Barnes (D)	Undecided
Patriot Polling (R)	July 22–26, 2026	922 (V)	± 3.0%	60%	39%	1%

Keith Gross vs. Amanda Green

Poll source	Date(s) administered	Sample size	Margin of error	Keith Gross (R)	Amanda Green (D)	Undecided
Patriot Polling (R)	July 22–26, 2026	922 (V)	± 3.0%	61%	37%	2%

Keith Gross vs. Nic Zateslo

Poll source	Date(s) administered	Sample size	Margin of error	Keith Gross (R)	Nic Zateslo (D)	Undecided
Patriot Polling (R)	July 22–26, 2026	922 (V)	± 3.0%	59%	39%	2%

Evan Power vs. Brice Barnes

Poll source	Date(s) administered	Sample size	Margin of error	Evan Power (R)	Brice Barnes (D)	Undecided
MDW Communications (D) (Note: Poll sponsored by Barnes' campaign)	June 2026	758 (V)	–	29%	30%	41%

==== Results ====
2026 Florida's 2nd congressional district election
Party	Candidate	Votes	%	±%
Republican	Austin Rogers	161,148	52.1%	
Democratic	Amanda Green	148,215	47.9%	
Total votes		309,363	100%	

== District 3 ==
2026 Florida's 3rd congressional district election
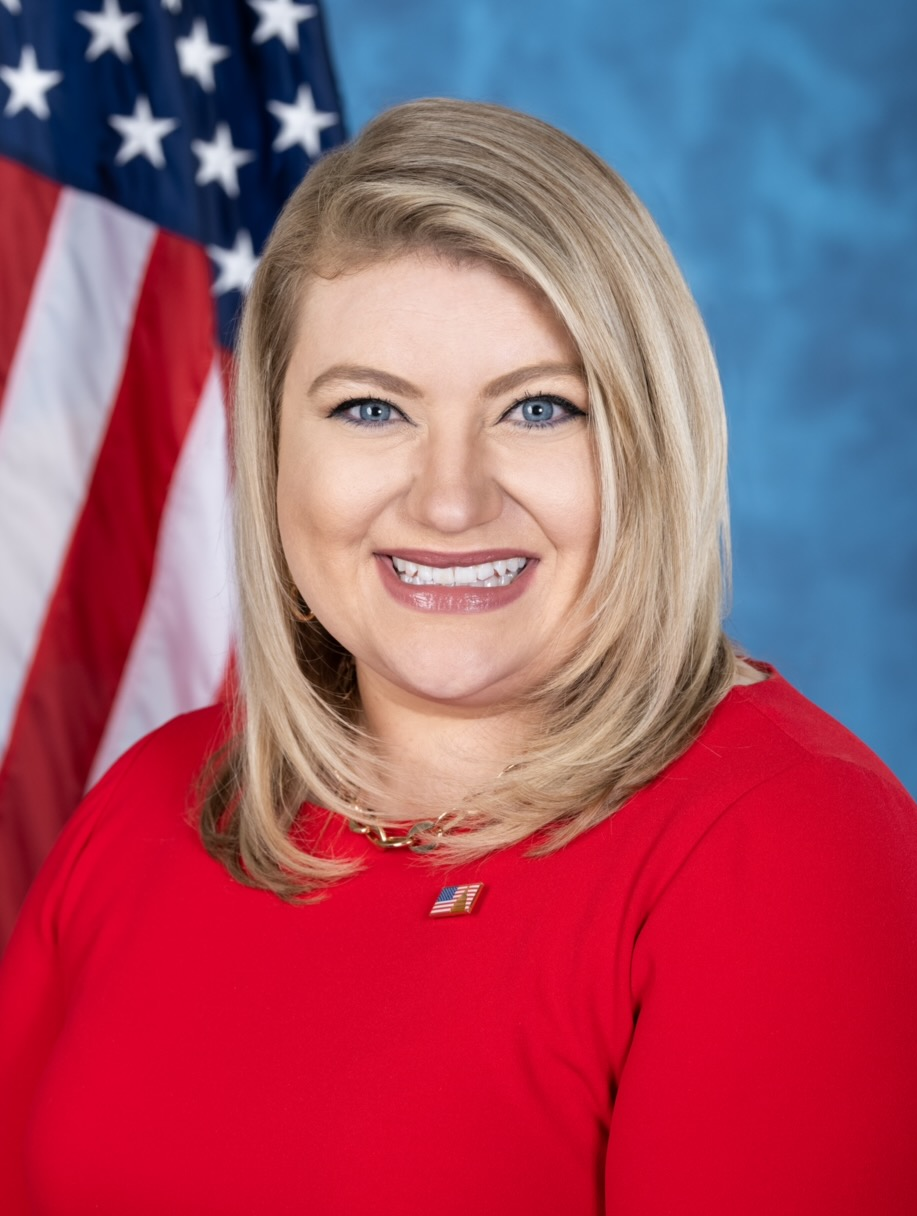

Nominee	Kat Cammack	Seth Harp
Party	Republican	Democratic
Popular vote	165,666	129,176
Percentage	55.14%	42.99%
- County results Cammack: 50–60% 60–70% 70–80% 80–90% Harp: 60–70%
U.S. Representative before election
Kat Cammack
Republican
Elected U.S. Representative
Kat Cammack
Republican

Florida's 3rd congressional district boundary from the 2026 elections Interactive map version

The incumbent is Republican Kat Cammack, who was re-elected with 61.6% of the vote in 2024.

=== Republican primary ===
==== Nominee ====
- Kat Cammack, incumbent U.S. representative

==== Endorsements ====
Kat Cammack

Executive branch officials

- Donald Trump, 45th and 47th president of the United States (2017–2021, 2025–present)

Organizations

- AIPAC
- Maggie's List
- Log Cabin Republicans

==== Fundraising ====
Campaign finance reports as of July 29, 2026
Candidate	Raised	Spent	Cash on hand
Kat Cammack (R)	$2,045,294	$1,723,874	$876,971
Source: Federal Election Commission

=== Democratic primary ===
==== Nominee ====
- Seth Harp, radio sports show host

==== Eliminated in primary ====
- Troy Albers, retired veteran
- George Hubac, former businessman
- Tom Wells, nominee for this district in 2024

==== Withdrawn ====
- Rock Aboujaoude Jr., nominee for the 12th district in 2024

==== Fundraising ====
Campaign finance reports as of July 29, 2026
Candidate	Raised	Spent	Cash on hand
Troy Albers (D) (Note: As of March 31, 2026)	$1,637 (Note: $1,637 was self funded)	$1,637	$0
Seth Harp (D)	$37,794	$34,784	$3,011
George Hubac (D)	$17,257 (Note: $12,201 was self funded)	$14,163	$3,094
Tom Wells (D)	$11,640 (Note: $11,200 was self funded)	$11,474	$470
Source: Federal Election Commission

==== Results ====
Democratic primary results
Party	Candidate	Votes	%
Democratic	Seth Harp	20,671	45.2
Democratic	Tom Wells	15,447	33.8
Democratic	Troy Albers	5,188	11.3
Democratic	George Hubac	4,458	9.7
Total votes		45,764	100.0

=== Third party and independents ===
==== Declared ====
- Mike Klein (Independent), veteran and nonprofit executive

==== Failed to qualify ====
- Anthony Stebbins (Libertarian), correctional officer and candidate for this district in 2024

==== Withdrawn ====
- Angela Wiman (Independent), worker and progressive activist

=== General election ===
==== Predictions ====
Source	Ranking	As of
Decision Desk HQ	Likely R	September 25, 2026
The Cook Political Report	Solid R	February 6, 2025
Inside Elections	Solid R	May 5, 2026
Sabato's Crystal Ball	Safe R	April 10, 2025
The Economist	Safe R	May 6, 2026

==== Post-Primary endorsements ====
Mike Klein (I)

U.S. representatives

- Dennis Kucinich, former OH-10 (1997–2013) (Independent, elected as a Democrat)

Political parties

- Forward Party

Organizations

- Independent Veterans of America
- Track AIPAC

==== Fundraising ====
Campaign finance reports as of October 14, 2026
Candidate	Raised	Spent	Cash on hand
Kat Cammack (R)	$2,437,580	$2,030,842	$962,289
Seth Harp (D)	$172,435	$128,289	$44,145
Mike Klein (I)	$120,556	$108,144	$12,412
Source: Federal Election Commission

==== Results ====
2026 Florida's 3rd congressional district election
Party	Candidate	Votes	%	±%
Republican	Kat Cammack (incumbent)	165,655	55.1%	
Democratic	Seth Harp	129,139	43.0%	
Independent	Mike Klein	5,617	1.9%	
Total votes		300,411	100%	

== District 4 ==
2026 Florida's 4th congressional district election
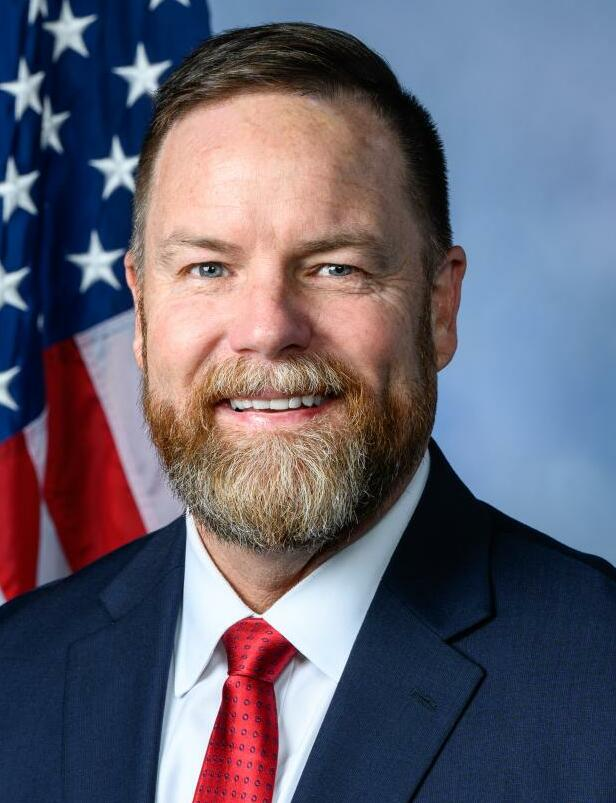

Nominee	Aaron Bean	LaShonda Holloway
Party	Republican	Democratic
Popular vote	151,217	144,926
Percentage	50.21%	48.12%
- County results Bean: 60–70% 70–80% Holloway: 60–70%
U.S. Representative before election
Aaron Bean
Republican
Elected U.S. Representative
Aaron Bean
Republican

Florida's 4th congressional district boundary from the 2026 elections Interactive map version

The incumbent is Republican Aaron Bean, who was elected with 57.3% of the vote in 2024.

=== Republican primary ===
==== Nominee ====
- Aaron Bean, incumbent U.S. representative

==== Endorsements ====
Aaron Bean

Executive branch officials

- Donald Trump, president of the United States (2017–2021, 2025–present)

Organizations

- AIPAC

==== Fundraising ====
Campaign finance reports as of July 29, 2026
Candidate	Raised	Spent	Cash on hand
Aaron Bean (R)	$2,163,376	$1,005,547	$1,632,550
Source: Federal Election Commission

=== Democratic primary ===
==== Nominee ====
- LaShonda "L.J." Holloway, former director in the District of Columbia Office of Documents and Administrative Issuances and nominee for this district in 2022 and 2024

==== Eliminated in primary ====
- Michael Kirwan, attorney
- Brit Robinson, interior designer and hospitality worker

==== Withdrawn ====
- Ricky Knoles, ESL teacher and school board candidate in 2024

==== Endorsements ====
L.J. Holloway

Individuals

- Ben Crump, attorney
Michael Kirwan

U.S. representatives

- Al Lawson, former FL-05 (2017–2023)

State legislators

- Tracie Davis, state senator from the 5th district (2022–present)
- Audrey Gibson, former minority leader of the Florida Senate (2018–2020) from the 6th district (2011–2022)
- Tony Hill, former state senator from the 1st district (2002–2011)

Local officials

- Bob Buckhorn, former mayor of Tampa (2011–2019)

Labor unions

- IAFF Local 122
- North Florida Building and Construction Trades Council
- SMART Local 435

==== Fundraising ====
Italics indicate a withdrawn candidate.

Campaign finance reports as of July 29, 2026
Candidate	Raised	Spent	Cash on hand
LaShonda Holloway (D)	$27,348	$14,155	$23,633
Michael Kirwan (D)	$742,680 (Note: $210,927 was self funded)	$580,078	$162,602
Brit Robinson (D)	$34,275	$29,168	$5,024
Source: Federal Election Commission

==== Polling ====
Poll source	Date(s) administered	Sample size	Margin of error	Lashonda "L.J." Holloway	Michael Kirwan	Brit Robinson	Other	Undecided
Tyson Group	July 15, 2026	400 (LV)	± 4.9%	41%	11%	4%	2% (Note: "Declined to answer" with 2%)	43%
? (Note: Poll sponsored by Robinson's campaign)	June 22, 2026	1,133 (RV)	± 2.9%	25%	13%	11%	–	51%

==== Results ====
Democratic primary results
Party	Candidate	Votes	%
Democratic	LaShonda "L.J." Holloway	29,772	57.3
Democratic	Michael Kirwan	15,809	30.4
Democratic	Brit Robinson	6,358	12.2
Total votes		51,939	100.0

=== Third party and independents ===
==== Nominee ====
- Mike Sell (Forward)
- Todd Schaefer (Independent), Navy veteran

=== General election ===
==== Predictions ====
Source	Ranking	As of
Decision Desk HQ	Lean R	October 30, 2026
The Cook Political Report	Likely R	November 2, 2026
Inside Elections	Solid R	May 5, 2026
Sabato's Crystal Ball	Safe R	April 10, 2025
The Economist	Likely R	May 6, 2026

==== Fundraising ====
Campaign finance reports as of October 14, 2026
Candidate	Raised	Spent	Cash on hand
Aaron Bean (R)	$2,682,267	$2,579,024	$577,964
LaShonda Holloway (D)	$58,546	$24,881	$44,105
Source: Federal Election Commission

==== Results ====
2026 Florida's 4th congressional district election
Party	Candidate	Votes	%	±%
Republican	Aaron Bean (incumbent)	151,163	50.2%	
Democratic	LaShonda Holloway	144,796	48.1%	
Independent	Todd Schaefer	3,194	1.1%	
Forward	Mike Sell	1,832	0.6%	
Total votes				

== District 5 ==
2026 Florida's 5th congressional district election
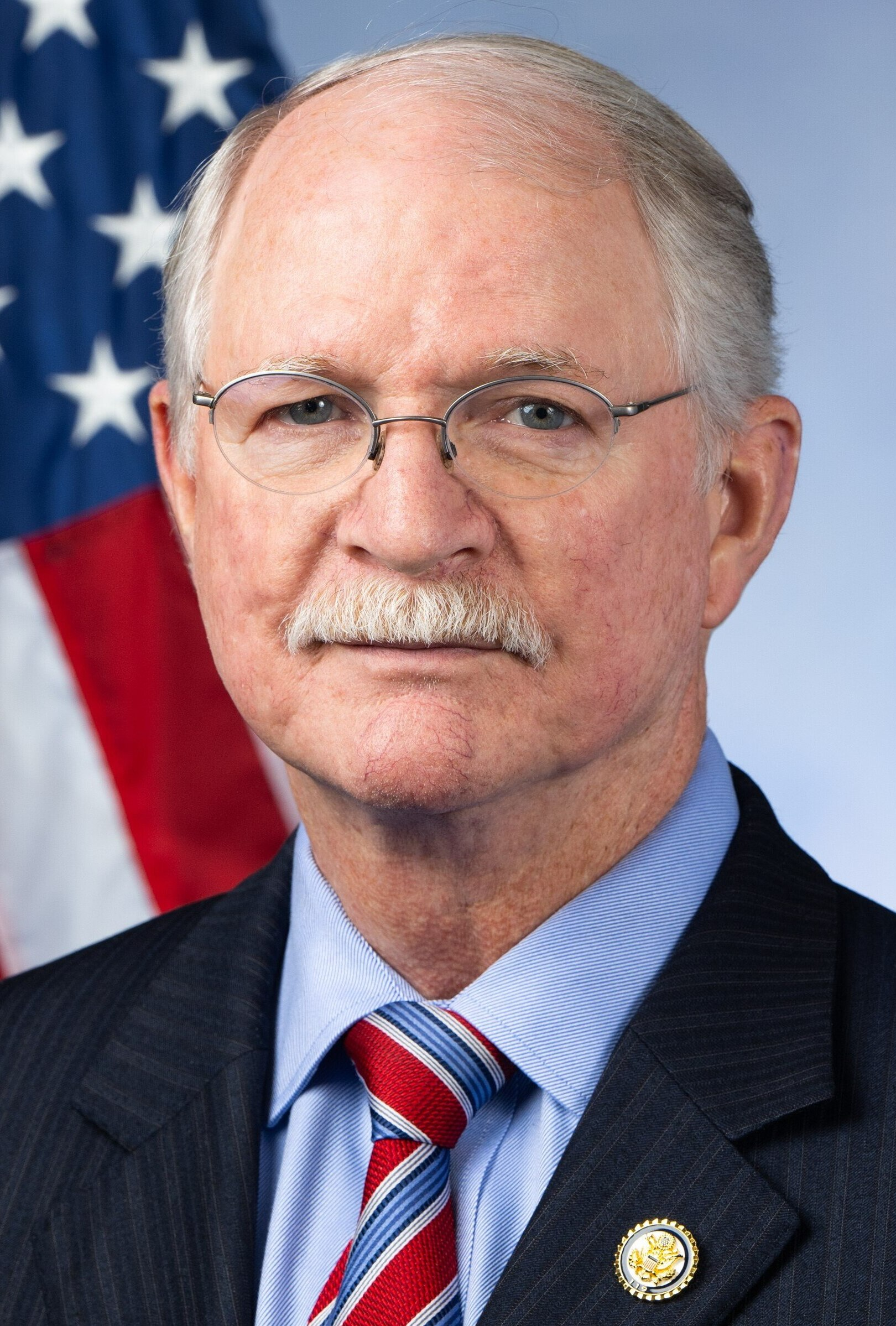

Nominee	John Rutherford	Rachel Grage
Party	Republican	Democratic
Popular vote	188,076	145,345
Percentage	56.40%	43.59%
- County results Rutherford: 50–60% 60–70%
U.S. Representative before election
John Rutherford
Republican
Elected U.S. Representative
John Rutherford
Republican

Florida's 5th congressional district boundary from the 2026 elections Interactive map version

The incumbent is Republican John Rutherford, who was re-elected with 63.1% of the vote in 2024.

=== Republican primary ===
==== Nominee ====
- John Rutherford, incumbent U.S. representative

==== Eliminated in primary ====
- Mark Kaye, conservative podcaster and former radio host

==== Write-in ====
- William Upham, Marine Corps veteran

==== Endorsements ====
John Rutherford

Executive branch officials

- Donald Trump, president of the United States (2017–2021, 2025–present)

Organizations

- AIPAC
- National Rifle Association Political Victory Fund
- United States Chamber of Commerce

==== Fundraising ====
Campaign finance reports as of July 29, 2026
Candidate	Raised	Spent	Cash on hand
Mark Kaye (R)	$31,456	$27,038	$4,418
John Rutherford (R)	$726,727	$635,666	$268,730
Source: Federal Election Commission

==== Results ====
Republican primary results
Party	Candidate	Votes	%
Republican	John Rutherford (incumbent)	54,072	67.7
Republican	Mark Kaye	25,793	32.3
Total votes		79,865	100.0

=== Democratic primary ===
==== Nominee ====
- Rachel Grage, biomedical engineer and nominee for HD-16 in 2024

==== Eliminated in primary ====
- Alex Hazen, software developer
- Mark Heggestad, project manager

==== Withdrawn ====
- Eli Johnson, truck driver

==== Endorsements ====
Rachel Grage

Labor unions

- Florida AFL-CIO

Organizations

- National Women's Political Caucus

==== Fundraising ====
Campaign finance reports as of July 29, 2026
Candidate	Raised	Spent	Cash on hand
Rachel Grage (D)	$272,423	$174,862	$90,533
Alex Hazen (D)	$18,632 (Note: $4,691 was self funded)	$12,978	$5,653
Mark Heggestad (D)	$52,519 (Note: $20,000 was self funded)	$37,171	$15,597
Source: Federal Election Commission

==== Results ====
Democratic primary results
Party	Candidate	Votes	%
Democratic	Rachel Grage	27,427	65.1
Democratic	Alex Hazen	9,119	21.6
Democratic	Mark Heggestad	5,607	13.3
Total votes		42,153	100.0

=== General election ===
==== Predictions ====
Source	Ranking	As of
Decision Desk HQ	Likely R	September 25, 2026
The Cook Political Report	Solid R	February 6, 2025
Inside Elections	Solid R	May 5, 2026
Sabato's Crystal Ball	Safe R	April 10, 2025

==== Post-primary endorsements ====
Rachel Grage (D)

Labor unions

- United Auto Workers

==== Fundraising ====
Campaign finance reports as of October 14, 2026
Candidate	Raised	Spent	Cash on hand
John Rutherford (R)	$913,650	$851,256	$240,063
Rachel Grage (D)	$448,143	$375,233	$65,881
Source: Federal Election Commission

==== Results ====
2026 Florida's 5th congressional district election
Party	Candidate	Votes	%	±%
Republican	John Rutherford (incumbent)	188,062	56.4%	
Democratic	Rachel Grage	145,296	43.6%	
Total votes				

== District 6 ==
2026 Florida's 6th congressional district election
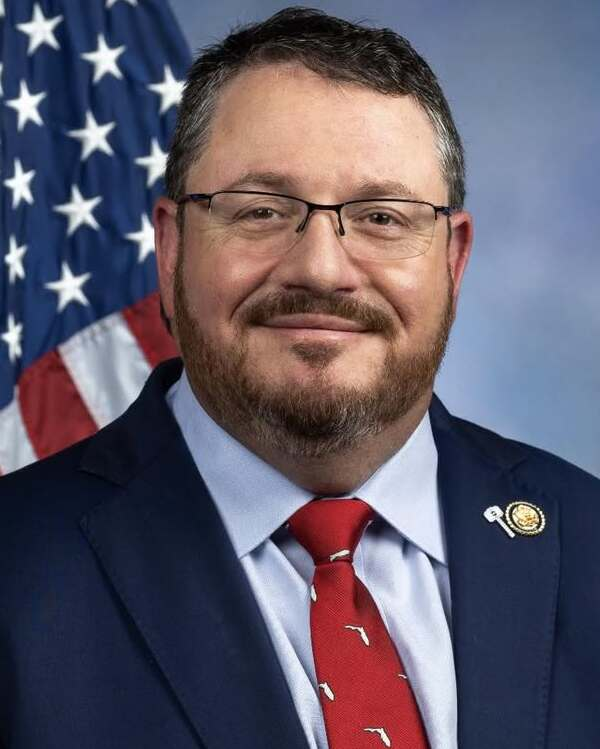

Nominee	Randy Fine	Eric Yonce
Party	Republican	Democratic
Popular vote	195,391	132,393
Percentage	58.93%	39.93%
- County results Fine: 50–60% 60–70%
U.S. Representative before election
Randy Fine
Republican
Elected U.S. Representative
Randy Fine
Republican

Florida's 6th congressional district boundary from the 2026 elections Interactive map version

Incumbent Republican Randy Fine won the primary election by a large margin. Fine assumed office on April 2, 2025, after winning the special election that occurred after Mike Waltz resigned to become national security advisor. He was elected with 56.6% of the vote. Fine was endorsed for re-election by President Donald Trump.

Fine's anti-Palestinian, Islamophobic, and racist comments on X regarding the Gaza war have sparked controversy and backlash, including condemnation from the American Jewish Committee. His challengers were viewed as likely to split the vote against him.

Gambaro has attacked Fine for his anti-Palestinian racism and called him a "security risk", while Baker has also criticized Fine as Israel First. Conversely, Bilzerian engaged in antisemitic rhetoric, which has included calling Fine a "fat Jew"; Bilzerian defended his comments by saying that Fine has made worse comments, pointing to when Fine stated that he preferred dogs to Muslims. Bilzerian released a video referring to Fine as a "Satanic whore" and "Shylock", while praising Adolf Hitler and envisioning a repetition of the Holocaust. By the final days of the campaign, Bilzerian's rhetoric had been denounced by multiple Republican and Democratic congressmen and the American Jewish Committee.

Fine criticized Bilzerian for holding Armenian citizenship, and late in the primary campaign, referred Bilzerian to the FBI for alleged campaign finance irregularities. On the day of the Republican primary, a video of Fine was posted online of him illegally looking inside of a voter's mailbox. According to CBS, Fine's actions constituted mail fraud and violated federal law; however, the homeowner declined to press charges against Fine.

=== Republican primary ===
==== Nominee ====
- Randy Fine, incumbent U.S. representative

==== Eliminated in primary ====
- Aaron Baker, candidate for this district in 2025
- Dan Bilzerian, influencer and former professional poker player
- Charles Gambaro, Palm Coast city councilor (2024–present) and U.S. Army general officer

==== Withdrawn ====
- Will Furry, Flagler County school board chair (running for re-election)

==== Endorsements ====
Aaron Baker

Individuals

- James Fishback, investor and candidate in the 2026 Florida gubernatorial election

Organizations

- ~~Anti-Zionist America PAC~~ (endorsed Bilzerian)
- Constitutional Sheriffs of Florida
Dan Bilzerian

Individuals

- Jake Shields, podcaster and former mixed martial artist
- Sneako, social media personality

Organizations

- Anti-Zionist America PAC
Randy Fine

Executive branch officials

- Donald Trump, 45th and 47th president of the United States (2017–2021, 2025–present)

U.S. representatives

- Mike Johnson, speaker of the United States House of Representatives (2023–present) from Louisiana's 4th congressional district (2017–present)

Local officials

- Billy Woods, sheriff of Marion County (2017–present)
- ~~Mike Chitwood, sheriff of Volusia County (2017–present)~~ (endorsement rescinded)
- Homer DeLoach III, sheriff of Putnam County (2017–present)
- Robert Hardwick, sheriff of St. Johns County (2021–present)
- Peyton C. Grinnell, sheriff of Lake County (2017–present)

Organizations

- AIPAC
- Freedom Caucus Fund
- National Rifle Association Political Victory Fund
- Republican Jewish Coalition
- Veterans for America First
Charles Gambaro

Executive branch officials

- Christopher C. Miller, former acting United States secretary of defense (2020–2021)

Statewide officials

- Jay Collins, lieutenant governor of Florida (2025–present)

Local officials

- Kent Guinn, former mayor of Ocala (2011–2023)
- Ben Johnson, former sheriff of Volusia County (2001–2017)
- R.J. Larizza, state attorney for the 7th judicial circuit (2009–present)
- R.J. Santore III, Flagler Beach city commissioner (2026–present)
- David Shoar, former sheriff of St. Johns County (2005–2021)
- David Sullivan, former Flagler County commissioner (2016–2024)

Labor unions

- International Association of Fire Fighters Local 4807
Declined to endorse

Local officials

- Rick Staly, sheriff of Flagler County (2017–present)

==== Fundraising ====
Italics indicate a withdrawn candidate.

Campaign finance reports as of July 29, 2026
Candidate	Raised	Spent	Cash on hand
Manuel Asensio (R)	$50,000 (Note: $50,000 was self funded)	$10,440	$39,560
Aaron Baker (R)	$109,091	$108,566	$518
Dan Bilzerian (R)	$1,241,450 (Note: $1,000,000 was self funded)	$386,622	$1,029,917
Randy Fine (R)	$4,286,207	$3,095,148	$1,191,059
Will Furry (R) (Note: Last reported on February 12, 2026)	$43,703 (Note: $16,191 was self funded)	$43,703	$0
Charles Gambaro (R)	$351,423 (Note: $256,000 was self funded)	$347,691	$3,733
Source: Federal Election Commission

==== Results ====
Republican primary results
Party	Candidate	Votes	%
Republican	Randy Fine (incumbent)	51,109	57.6
Republican	Dan Bilzerian	16,776	18.9
Republican	Aaron Baker	12,074	13.6
Republican	Charles Gambaro	8,716	9.8
Total votes		88,675	100.0

=== Democratic primary ===
==== Nominee ====
- Eric Yonce, realtor

==== Eliminated in primary ====
- Robert Cooper, Marine veteran
- Steve Morgan, entrepreneur
- Ronnie Murchinson-Rivera, police officer

==== Withdrawn ====
- Jennifer Jenkins, former Brevard County school board member (previously ran for U.S. Senate) (running in the 8th district)

==== Fundraising ====
Campaign finance reports as of July 29, 2026
Candidate	Raised	Spent	Cash on hand
Robert Cooper (D)	$68,205 (Note: $24,000 was self funded)	$64,510	$0
Steve Morgan (D)	$8,250 (Note: $5,010 was self funded)	$15,200	$0
Ronnie Murchinson-Rivera (D)	$176,594	$158,410	$23,946
Eric Yonce (D)	$325,710	$291,614	$34,096
Source: Federal Election Commission

==== Results ====
Democratic primary results
Party	Candidate	Votes	%
Democratic	Eric Yonce	13,465	32.1
Democratic	Ronnie Murchinson-Rivera	11,260	26.9
Democratic	Steve Morgan	9,763	23.3
Democratic	Robert Cooper	7,414	17.7
Total votes		41,902	100.0

=== Third party and independents ===
==== Declared ====
- Andrew Parrott (Libertarian)
- Michael Gist (Independent), former public school teacher
- Alec Pavlik (Independent) (write-in)

==== Withdrawn ====
- Amr Metwally (MGTOW Party), activist, actor, and perennial candidate
- Purvi Bangdiwala (Independent)

=== General election ===
==== Predictions ====
Source	Ranking	As of
Decision Desk HQ	Safe R	July 14, 2026
The Cook Political Report	Solid R	February 6, 2025
Inside Elections	Solid R	May 5, 2026
Sabato's Crystal Ball	Safe R	April 10, 2025
The Economist	Safe R	May 6, 2026

==== Post-primary endorsements ====
Eric Yonce (D)

Organizations

- Track AIPAC

==== Fundraising ====
Campaign finance reports as of October 14, 2026
Candidate	Raised	Spent	Cash on hand
Randy Fine (R)	$4,645,045	$4,460,456	$184,588
Eric Yonce (D)	$619,305	$522,399	$96,905
Source: Federal Election Commission

==== Results ====
2026 Florida's 6th congressional district election
Party	Candidate	Votes	%	±%
Republican	Randy Fine (incumbent)			
Democratic	Eric Yonce			
Libertarian	Andrew Parrott			
Independent	Michael Gist			
Write-In	Alec Pavlik			
Total votes				

== District 7 ==
2026 Florida's 7th congressional district election

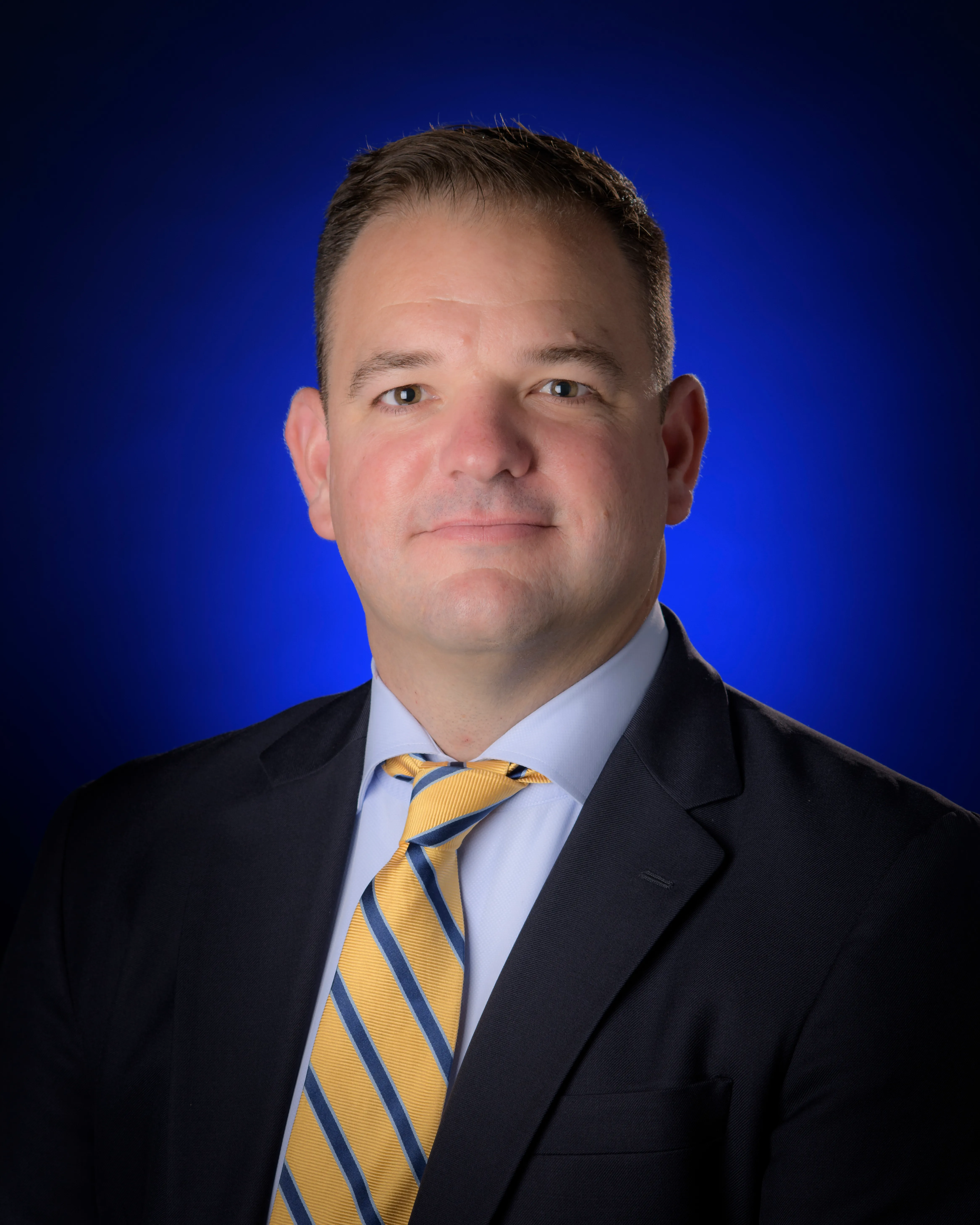
Nominee	Ryan Elijah	Bale Dalton
Party	Republican	Democratic
Popular vote	161,303	159,689
Percentage	49.71%	49.21%
- County results Elijah: 50–60% Dalton: 50–60%
U.S. Representative before election
Cory Mills
Republican
Elected U.S. Representative
Ryan Elijah
Republican

Florida's 7th congressional district boundary from the 2026 elections Interactive map version

The incumbent was Republican Cory Mills, who was re-elected with 56.5% of the vote in 2024. Mills sought re-election, but lost in the primary.

=== Republican primary ===
==== Candidates ====
===== Nominee =====
- Ryan Elijah, former WOFL reporter and candidate for Indiana's 3rd congressional district in 2010

===== Eliminated in primary =====
- Mike Johnson, retired DOD program manager and perennial candidate
- Cory Mills, incumbent U.S. representative
- Sarah Ulrich, businesswoman

===== Declined =====
- Jay Collins, lieutenant governor of Florida (2025–present) and candidate for the 14th district in 2022 (ran for governor)

==== Endorsements ====
Ryan Elijah

U.S. representatives

- Mike Haridopolos, FL-08 (2025–present)
- Anna Paulina Luna, FL-13 (2023–present)

Statewide officials

- Bill McCollum, 36th attorney general of Florida (2007–2011) and former U.S. representative from FL-08 (1981–2001)

State legislators

- Rachel Plakon, state senator from the 36th district (2022–present)
- Paul Renner, former speaker of the Florida House of Representatives (2022–2024) from the 19th district (2015–2024)
- Tom Wright, state senator from the 8th district (2018–present)

Local officials

- Paul Blackman, Highlands County sheriff
- Mike Chitwood, Volusia County sheriff
- Grady Judd, Polk County sheriff
- Dennis Lemma, Seminole County sheriff
Cory Mills

Executive branch officials

- Donald Trump, president of the United States (2017–2021, 2025–present)

U.S. representatives

- Brian Mast, FL-21 (2017–present)

Organizations

- AIPAC
- National Rifle Association Political Victory Fund
Declined to endorse

Statewide officials

- Ron DeSantis, governor of Florida (2019–present) (endorsed against Mills)

==== Fundraising ====
Campaign finance reports as of July 29, 2026
Candidate	Raised	Spent	Cash on hand
Ryan Elijah	$355,955 (Note: $134,100 was self funded)	$169,801	$186,155
Mike Johnson (R)	$60,098 (Note: $41,731 was self funded)	$61,826	$7,895
Cory Mills (R)	$880,711	$853,938	$67,665
Sarah Ulrich (R)	$19,059 (Note: $10,440 was self funded)	$17,665	$1,394
Source: Federal Election Commission

==== Polling ====
Poll source	Date(s) administered	Sample size	Margin of error	Ryan Elijah	Mike Johnson	Cory Mills	Sarah Ulrich	Other	Undecided
Capital Strategic Partners	August 14–15, 2026	929 (LV)	± 3.3%	44%	–	27%	–	10% (Note: "Another candidate" with 10%)	19%
Victory Insights (R)	August 4–6, 2026	1,200 (LV)	–	22%	3%	28%	5%	–	42%
St. Pete Polls (Note: Poll sponsored by Florida Politics)	August 3–4, 2026	304 (LV)	± 5.6%	14%	7%	30%	8%	–	41%

==== Debate ====
2026 Florida's 7th congressional district Republican primary debate
No.	Date	Host	Moderator	Link	Republican	Republican	Republican	Republican
Key: P Participant A Absent N Not invited I Invited W Withdrawn								
Key: P Participant A Absent N Not invited I Invited W Withdrawn					Ryan Elijah	Mike Johnson	Cory Mills	Sarah Ulrich
1	Aug. 5, 2026	The Floridian	Javier Manjarres	YouTube	P	P	P	P

==== Results ====
Republican primary results
Party	Candidate	Votes	%
Republican	Ryan Elijah	31,558	47.3
Republican	Cory Mills (incumbent)	22,753	34.1
Republican	Sarah Ulrich	7,010	10.5
Republican	Mike Johnson	5,411	8.1
Total votes		66,732	100.0

=== Democratic primary ===
==== Candidates ====
===== Nominee =====
- Bale Dalton, former NASA chief of staff

===== Eliminated in primary =====
- Alan Grayson, former U.S. representative from Florida's 9th congressional district (2009–2011, 2013–2017) and perennial candidate
- Marialana Kinter, former nuclear reactor supervisor

===== Withdrawn =====
- Noah Widmann, lawyer (endorsed Dalton)

===== Declined =====
- Darren Soto, incumbent U.S. representative from the 9th district (running for re-election)

==== Endorsements ====
Bale Dalton

Federal officials

- Pete Buttigieg, former secretary of transportation (2021–2025)

U.S. senators

- Bill Nelson, former Florida (2001–2019)

U.S. representatives

- Kathy Castor, FL-14 (2007–present)
- Suzan DelBene, WA-01 (2012–present)
- Adam Gray, CA-13 (2025–present)
- Stephanie Murphy, former FL-07 (2017–2023)

Statewide officials

- Mikie Sherrill, governor of New Jersey (2026–present)

Local officials

- Buddy Dyer, mayor of Orlando (2003–present)

Individuals

- Noah Widmann, lawyer and former candidate for this district
- Matthew Yglesias, journalist

Organizations

- 314 Action
- Blue Dog PAC
- DCCC Red to Blue
- VoteVets.org
Marialana Kinter

Organizations

- Center for Freethought Equality
- Democratic Progressive Caucus of Florida
- National Organization for Women PAC
- Track AIPAC
Noah Widmann (withdrawn)

Executive branch officials

- Alex Vindman, former director of European affairs for the National Security Council (2018–2020)

U.S. representatives

- Karen Thurman, former FL-05 (1993–2003)

State legislators

- LaVon Bracy Davis, state senator from the 15th district (2025–present)
- Rita Harris, state representative from the 44th district (2022–present)
- Yvonne Hayes Hinson, state representative from the 21st district (2020–present)
- RaShon Young, state representative from the 40th district (2025–present)

==== Fundraising ====
Italics indicate a withdrawn candidate.

Campaign finance reports as of July 29, 2026
Candidate	Raised	Spent	Cash on hand
Bale Dalton (D)	$1,378,109	$902,251	$475,858
Alan Grayson (D)	$388,153 (Note: $173,697 was self funded)	$386,772	$128,299
Marialana Kinter (D)	$565,078	$505,225	$59,853
Source: Federal Election Commission

==== Results ====
Democratic primary results
Party	Candidate	Votes	%
Democratic	Bale Dalton	21,776	45.5
Democratic	Marialana Kinter	17,022	35.6
Democratic	Alan Grayson	9,071	18.9
Total votes		47,869	100.0

=== Libertarian primary ===
==== Nominee ====
- Christopher Dennison

=== General election ===
==== Predictions ====
Source	Ranking	As of
Decision Desk HQ	Lean R	October 29, 2026
The Cook Political Report	Lean R	October 30, 2026
Inside Elections	Likely R	October 29, 2026
Sabato's Crystal Ball	Lean R	November 2, 2026
The Economist	Tossup	October 29, 2026

==== Post-primary endorsements ====
Ryan Elijah (R)

Executive branch officials

- Donald Trump, president of the United States (2017–2021, 2025–present)

Statewide officials

- Ron DeSantis, governor of Florida (2019–present)
Bale Dalton (D)

U.S. senators

- Mel Martinez, Florida (2005–2009) (Republican)

Organizations

- Democratic Majority for Israel
- Giffords

Newspapers

- Orlando Sentinel

==== Fundraising ====
Campaign finance reports as of October 14, 2026
Candidate	Raised	Spent	Cash on hand
Ryan Elijah (R)	$818,460	$645,454	$173,006
Bale Dalton (D)	$2,334,664	$2,132,410	$202,254
Christopher Dennison (L)	$10,500	$10,440	$60
Source: Federal Election Commission

==== Polling ====
Poll source	Date(s) administered	Sample size	Margin of error	Ryan Elijah (R)	Bale Dalton (D)	Undecided
DCCC	October 17–19, 2026	414 (LV)	± 4.8%	45%	45%	10%

Hypothetical polling

Cory Mills vs. Bale Dalton

Poll source	Date(s) administered	Sample size	Margin of error	Cory Mills (R)	Bale Dalton (D)	Undecided
Public Policy Polling (D) (Note: Poll sponsored by Dalton's campaign)	May 20–21, 2026	570 (RV)	± 4.1%	39%	41%	19%

Generic Republican vs. Generic Democrat

Poll source	Date(s) administered	Sample size	Margin of error	Generic Republican	Generic Democrat	Undecided
DCCC	October 17–19, 2026	414 (LV)	± 4.8%	47%	44%	9%

==== Results ====
2026 Florida's 7th congressional district election
Party	Candidate	Votes	%	±%
Republican	Ryan Elijah	161,303	49.7	
Democratic	Bale Dalton	159,689	49.2	
Libertarian	Christopher Dennison	3,486	1.1	
Total votes		324,478	100.00	
Republican hold				

== District 8 ==
2026 Florida's 8th congressional district election
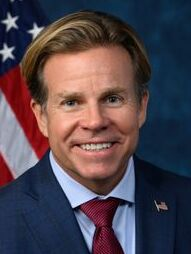

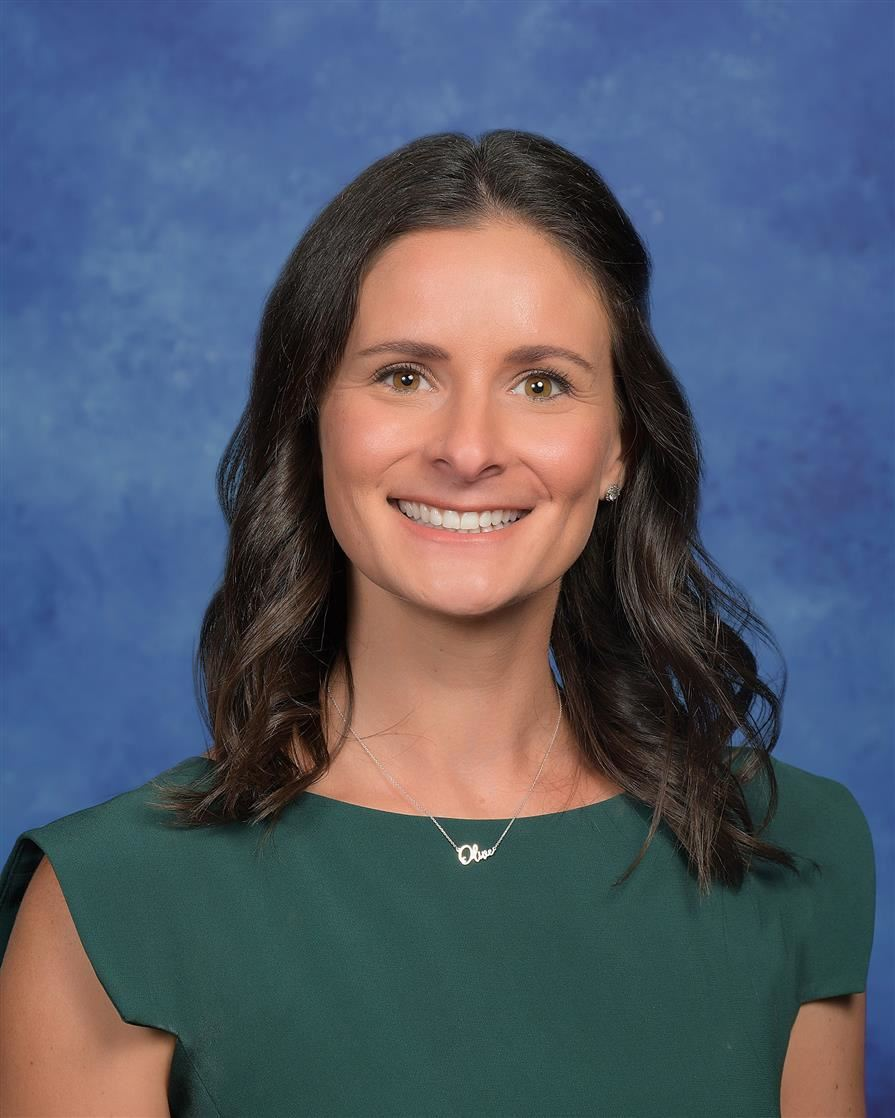
Nominee	Mike Haridopolos	Jennifer Jenkins
Party	Republican	Democratic
Popular vote	169,945	149,741
Percentage	53.16%	46.84%
U.S. Representative before election
Mike Haridopolos
Republican
Elected U.S. Representative
Mike Haridopolos
Republican

Florida's 8th congressional district boundary from the 2026 elections Interactive map version

The incumbent is Republican Mike Haridopolos, who was elected with 62.2% of the vote in 2024.

=== Republican primary ===
==== Nominee ====
- Mike Haridopolos, incumbent U.S. representative

==== Endorsements ====
Mike Haridopolos

Executive branch officials

- Donald Trump, 45th and 47th president of the United States (2017–2021, 2025–present)

Organizations

- AIPAC

==== Fundraising ====
Campaign finance reports as of July 29, 2026
Candidate	Raised	Spent	Cash on hand
Mike Haridopolos (R)	$1,824,838	$885,224	$1,197,777
Source: Federal Election Commission

=== Democratic primary ===
==== Nominee ====
- Jennifer Jenkins, former Brevard County school board member (previously ran in the 6th district)

==== Withdrawn ====
- Colby Shock, caregiver and former president of the Young Democrats of Indian River

==== Endorsements ====
Jennifer Jenkins

Executive branch officials

- Alex Vindman, former director of European affairs for the National Security Council (2018–2020) and candidate for Senate in 2026

U.S. representatives

- Kathy Castor, U.S. representative from Florida's 14th congressional district (Note: Numbered as the 11th from 2007–2013) (2007–present)

Labor unions

- Florida AFL-CIO

Organizations

- Vote Mama

==== Fundraising ====
Italics indicate a withdrawn candidate.

Campaign finance reports as of July 29, 2026
Candidate	Raised	Spent	Cash on hand
Jennifer Jenkins (D)	$725,731	$617,619	$108,111
Source: Federal Election Commission

=== Independent Party of Florida primary ===
==== Withdrawn ====
- Lacey Villareal

=== General election ===
==== Predictions ====
Source	Ranking	As of
Decision Desk HQ	Likely R	October 29, 2026
The Cook Political Report	Solid R	October 30, 2026
Inside Elections	Solid R	October 29, 2026
Sabato's Crystal Ball	Safe R	October 29, 2025
The Economist	Likely R	October 29, 2026

==== Post-primary endorsements ====
Mike Haridopolos (R)

Organizations

- United States Chamber of Commerce
Jennifer Jenkins (D)

Organizations

- National Women's Political Caucus

==== Fundraising ====
Campaign finance reports as of October 14, 2026
Candidate	Raised	Spent	Cash on hand
Mike Haridopolos (R)	$2,049,237	$1,825,050	$482,350
Jennifer Jenkins (D)	$960,174	$807,452	$152,722
Source: Federal Election Commission

==== Polling ====
Poll source	Date(s) administered	Sample size	Margin of error	Mike Haridopolos (R)	Jennifer Jenkins (D)	Undecided
Inquire LLC (R)	July 27–29, 2026	(LV)	–	51%	42%	7%
Public Policy Polling (D) (Note: Poll sponsored by Jenkins' campaign)	July 17–18, 2026	633 (RV)	± 3.9%	44%	35%	21%

==== Results ====
2026 Florida's 8th congressional district election
Party	Candidate	Votes	%	±%
Republican	Mike Haridopolos (incumbent)			
Democratic	Jennifer Jenkins			
Total votes				

== District 9 ==
2026 Florida's 9th congressional district election
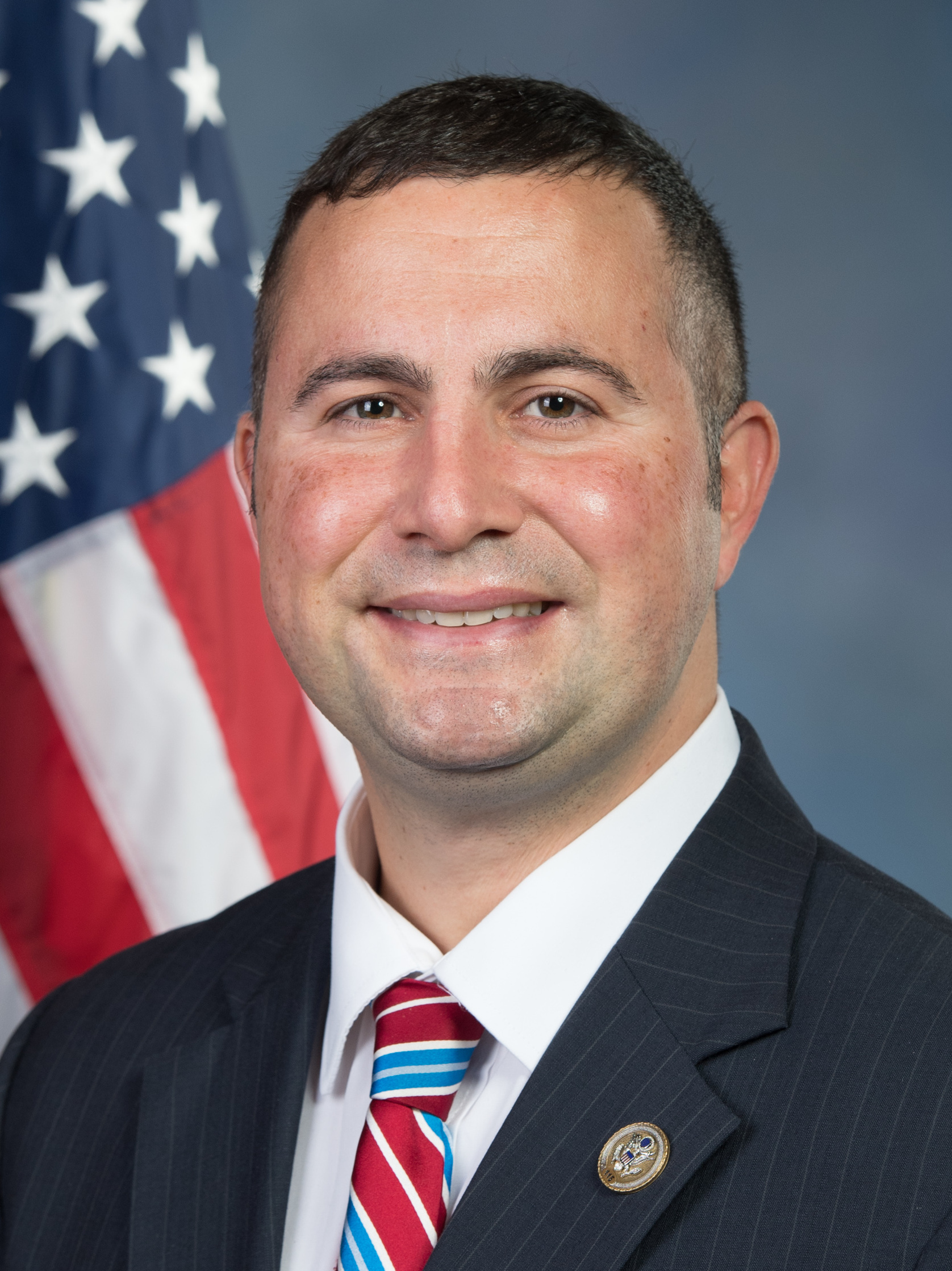

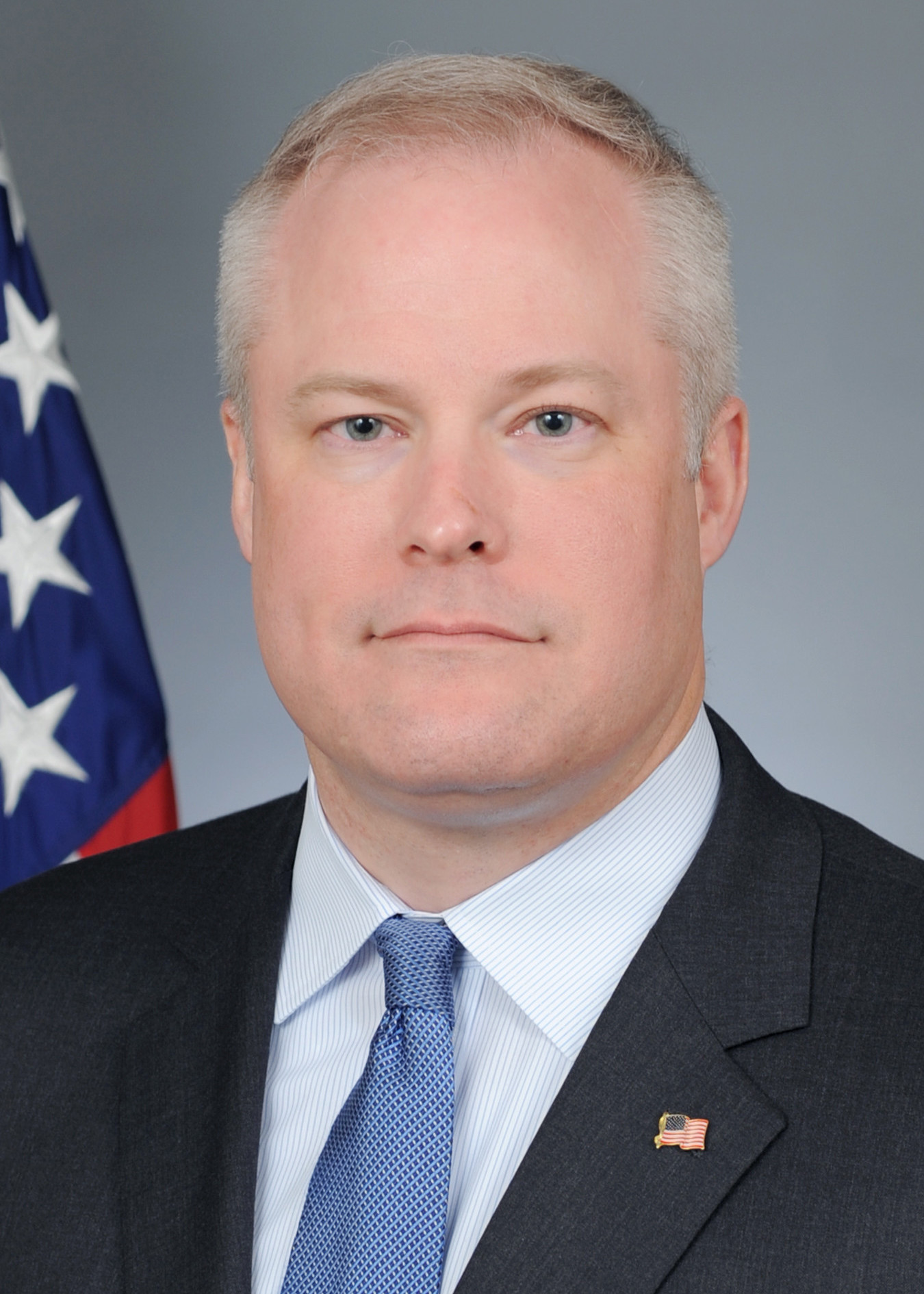
Nominee	Darren Soto	Dan Green
Party	Democratic	Republican
Popular vote	143,354	141,814
Percentage	50.27%	49.73%
U.S. Representative before election
Darren Soto
Democratic
Elected U.S. Representative
Darren Soto
Democratic

Florida's 9th congressional district boundary from the 2026 elections Interactive map version

The incumbent is Democrat Darren Soto, who was re-elected with 55.1% of the vote in 2024.

=== Democratic primary ===
==== Nominee ====
- Darren Soto, incumbent U.S. representative

==== Declined ====
- Jerry Demings, mayor of Orange County (2018–present) and husband of former U.S. representative Val Demings (ran for governor)

==== Endorsements ====
Darren Soto

Labor unions

- AFGE
- Florida AFL-CIO
- United Auto Workers

Organizations

- AIPAC
- Democratic Majority for Israel
- Latino Victory
- Planned Parenthood Action Fund
- Sierra Club

==== Fundraising ====
Campaign finance reports as of July 29, 2026
Candidate	Raised	Spent	Cash on hand
Darren Soto (D)	$2,157,834	$984,598	$1,187,355
Source: Federal Election Commission

=== Republican primary ===
==== Nominee ====
- Dan Green, former deputy assistant secretary of defense for strategy and force development, Navy reserve officer

==== Eliminated in primary ====
- Ben Butler, member of the South Florida Water Management District governing board
- Marcus Carter, businessman and independent candidate for this district in 2024
- Thomas Chalifoux, former Osceola County School Board member, candidate for Florida's 79th House of Representatives district in 2010, and nominee for this district in 2024
- Jorge Martinez, businessman and withdrawn candidate for this district in 2022
- Steve Rance, Air Force veteran and former Cass County, Indiana commissioner
- Justin Story, commercial pilot and retired Marine Corps officer

==== Withdrawn ====
- Antonio Jorge Malavet, former United States Citizenship and Immigration Services official

==== Declined ====
- Robbie Brackett, state representative from the 34th district (2022–present) (running for re-election)

==== Endorsements ====
Ben Butler

U.S. representatives

- Kat Cammack, FL-03 (2021–present)
- Anna Paulina Luna, FL-13 (2023–present)
- Greg Steube, FL-17 (2019–present)
- Glenn Thompson, PA-15 (2009–present)

State legislators

- Ben Albritton, president of the Florida Senate (2024–present) from the 27th district (2018–present)
- Denise Grimsley, former state senator from the 26th district (2012–2018)
- Cary Pigman, former state representative from the 55th district (2012–2020)

Local officials

- Paul Blackman, Highlands County sheriff
- Eric Flowers, Indian River County sheriff
- David Hardin, Glades County sheriff
- Noel Stephen, Okeechobee County sheriff

Labor unions

- IAFF Local 2918
Dan Green

U.S. senators

- Connie Mack III, former United States senator from Florida (1989–2001)

U.S. representatives

- Mike Haridopolos, FL-08 (2025–present)
- Jim Jordan, OH-04 (2007–present)

State legislators

- Danny Burgess, state senator from the 23rd district (2020–present)
- Patt Maney, state representative from the 4th district (2020–present)
- Fiona McFarland, state representative from the 73rd district (2020–present)
- Ralph Poppell, former state representative from the 5th district (2002–2010)

Local officials

- Chris Blackmon, Osceola County sheriff
- Brian Foley, Indian River Shores mayor
- Wayne Ivey, Brevard County sheriff
- Charlie Sembler, former Indian River County tax collector (2001–2009)
- Dowling Watford, Okeechobee mayor

Individuals

- Mark Donald, retired Navy SEAL
- Félix Rodríguez, retired CIA officer
- Jamal Sowell, former Florida secretary of commerce
Steve Rance

U.S. representatives

- Mark Harris, NC-08 (2025–present)

==== Fundraising ====
Italics indicate a withdrawn candidate.

Campaign finance reports as of July 29, 2026
Candidate	Raised	Spent	Cash on hand
Ben Butler (R)	$386,673	$274,398	$112,275
Marcus Carter (R)	$22,475	$21,951	$1,803
Thomas Chalifoux (R)	$3,139,737 (Note: $3,003,928 was self funded)	$1,776,689	$1,966,256
Dan Green (R)	$1,298,516 (Note: $1,040,000 was self funded)	$935,273	$363,243
Jorge Martinez (R)	$854,898 (Note: $511,258 was self funded)	$564,749	$290,149
Steve Rance (R)	$152,757 (Note: $85,050 was self funded)	$144,980	$7,777
Justin Story (R)	$92,585 (Note: $82,650 was self funded)	$55,168	$37,417
Source: Federal Election Commission

==== Polling ====
Poll source	Date(s) administered	Sample size	Margin of error	Ben Butler	Thomas Chalifoux	Dan Green	Jorge Martinez	Other	Undecided
Victory Insights (R)	August 4–6, 2026	1,200 (LV)	–	14%	14%	12%	14%	6% (Note: Justin Story with 3%; Marcus Carter with 2%; Steve Rance with 1%)	41%

==== Results ====
Republican primary results
Party	Candidate	Votes	%
Republican	Dan Green	14,748	25.4
Republican	Ben Butler	14,161	24.4
Republican	Thomas Chalifoux	11,802	20.3
Republican	Jorge Martinez	11,324	19.5
Republican	Justin Story	2,484	4.3
Republican	Marcus Carter	2,248	3.9
Republican	Steve Rance	1,335	2.3
Total votes		58,102	100.0

=== General election ===
==== Predictions ====
Source	Ranking	As of
Decision Desk HQ	Tossup	November 2, 2026
The Cook Political Report	Lean R (flip)	November 2, 2026
Inside Elections	Likely R (flip)	November 2, 2026
Sabato's Crystal Ball	Lean R (flip)	November 2, 2026
The Economist	Lean R (flip)	November 2, 2026

==== Post-primary endorsements ====
Dan Green (R)

Executive branch officials

- Donald Trump, 45th and 47th president of the United States (2017–2021, 2025–present)

Statewide officials

- Ron DeSantis, governor of Florida (2019–present)

U.S. representatives

- Richard Hudson, NC-09 (2013–present)

State legislators

- Joe Gruters, state senator from the 22nd district (2018–present) and chair of the Republican National Committee (2025–present)

Organizations

- NRCC MAGA Majority
Darren Soto (D)

Sheriffs

- John Mina, Orange County sheriff

Labor unions

- Amalgamated Transit Union
- Association of Flight Attendants
- Association of Professional Flight Attendants
- Brotherhood of Locomotive Engineers and Trainmen
- Communications Workers of America
- Florida Education Association
- Florida State Association of Letter Carriers
- IBEW Local 606
- International Alliance of Theatrical Stage Employees
- International Association of Fire Fighters
- International Association of Machinists and Aerospace Workers
- International Union of Bricklayers and Allied Craftworkers
- International Union of Painters and Allied Trades
- Laborers' International Union of North America
- National Association of Letter Carriers
- National Education Association
- Sheet Metal Workers' International Association
- Teamsters Local 79
- UNITE HERE
- United Food and Commercial Workers

Organizations

- Jewish Democratic Council of America
- League of Conservation Voters

==== Fundraising ====
Campaign finance reports as of October 14, 2026
Candidate	Raised	Spent	Cash on hand
Darren Soto (D)	$3,652,280	$3,416,404	$249,995
Dan Green (R)	$2,692,713	$2,243,203	$449,960
Source: Federal Election Commission

==== Polling ====
Poll source	Date(s) administered	Sample size	Margin of error	Darren Soto (D)	Dan Green (R)	Undecided
SEA Polling (D) (Note: Poll sponsored by Soto's campaign)	October 10–15, 2026	— (LV)	± 4.9%	44%	44%	12%
SEA Polling (D)	August 24–30, 2026	400 (RV)	± 4.9%	41%	41%	18%

==== Results ====
2026 Florida's 9th congressional district election
Party	Candidate	Votes	%	±%
Democratic	Darren Soto (incumbent)			
Republican	Dan Green			
Total votes				

== District 10 ==
2026 Florida's 10th congressional district election
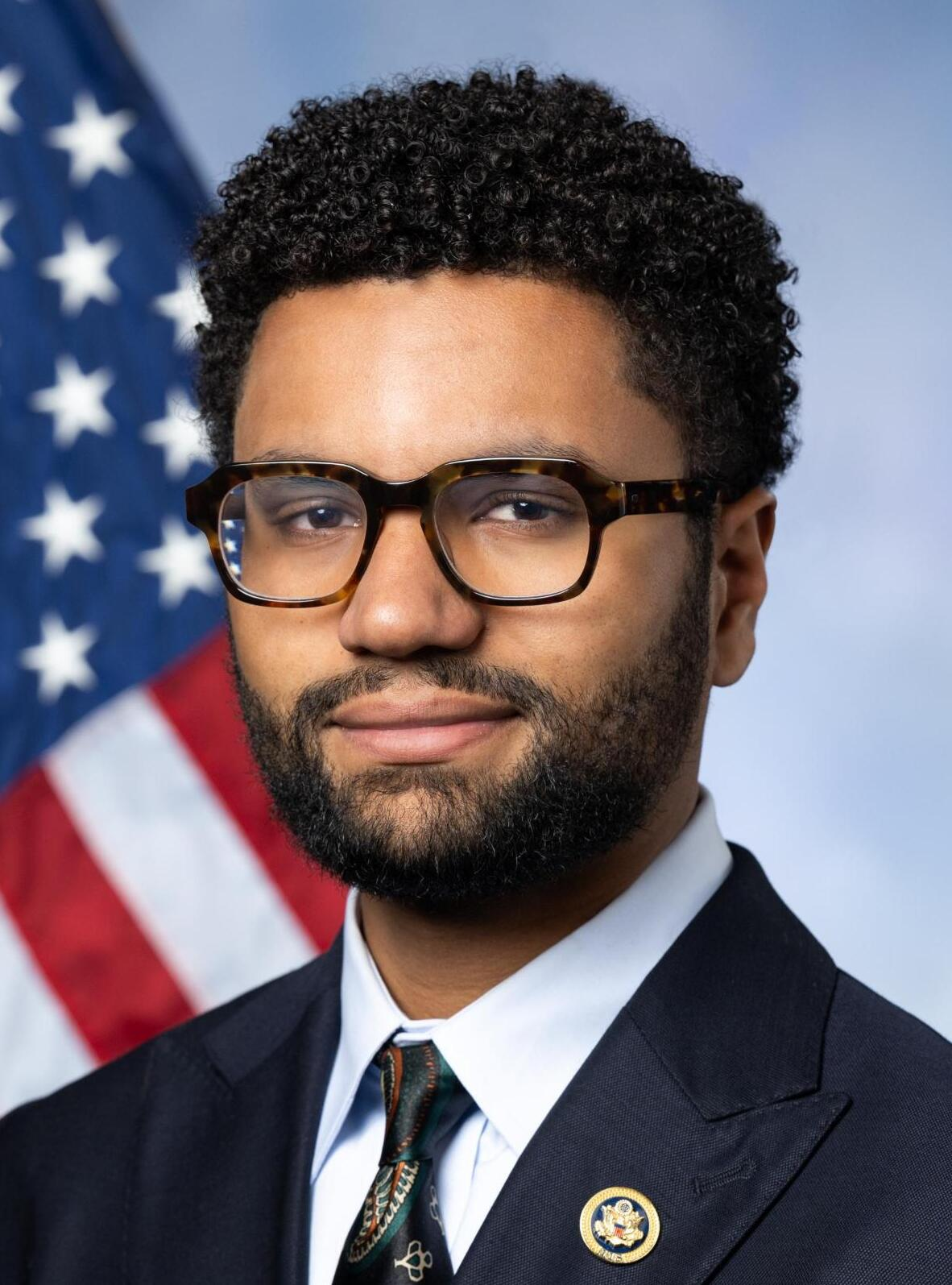
Nominee	Maxwell Frost (Uncontested)
Party	Democratic
U.S. Representative before election
Maxwell Frost
Democratic
Elected U.S. Representative
Maxwell Frost
Democratic

Florida's 10th congressional district boundary from the 2026 elections Interactive map version

The incumbent is Democrat Maxwell Frost, who was re-elected with 62.4% of the vote in 2024. Frost is the only candidate after all opponents failed to qualify, resulting in the primary and general elections being cancelled under Florida law.

=== Democratic primary ===
==== Nominee ====
- Maxwell Frost, incumbent U.S. representative

==== Declined ====
- Jerry Demings, mayor of Orange County (2018–present) and husband of former U.S. representative Val Demings (ran for governor)
- Darren Soto, incumbent U.S. representative from the 9th district (running for re-election)

==== Endorsements ====
Maxwell Frost

Labor unions

- AFGE
- Florida AFL-CIO
- United Auto Workers

Organizations

- Christopher Street Project
- Emgage Action
- End Citizens United
- Peace Action
- Planned Parenthood Action Fund
- Population Connection
- Progressive Democrats of America
- Reproductive Freedom for All
- Sierra Club
- Southern Poverty Law Center Action Fund

==== Fundraising ====
Campaign finance reports as of July 29, 2026
Candidate	Raised	Spent	Cash on hand
Maxwell Frost (D)	$3,474,867	$3,283,537	$1,283,056
Source: Federal Election Commission

=== Republican primary ===
==== Failed to qualify ====
- Vibert "Issa" White, college professor and perennial candidate

==== Withdrawn ====
- Stuart Farber, physician
- Willie Montague, nonprofit leader
- Angie Windhauser, nonprofit leader

==== Fundraising ====
Campaign finance reports as of June 30, 2026
Candidate	Raised	Spent	Cash on hand
Willie Montague (R)	$109	$21	$88
Source: Federal Election Commission

=== Libertarian primary ===
==== Disqualified ====
- Brent Lawhon, realtor (write-in)

=== General election ===
==== Predictions ====
Source	Ranking	As of
Decision Desk HQ	Safe D	July 14, 2026
The Cook Political Report	Solid D	February 6, 2025
Inside Elections	Solid D	May 5, 2026
Sabato's Crystal Ball	Safe D	April 10, 2025
The Economist	Safe D	May 6, 2026

==== Post-primary endorsements ====
Maxwell Frost (D)

Labor unions

- National Education Association

Organizations

- MoveOn

==== Fundraising ====
Campaign finance reports as of October 14, 2026
Candidate	Raised	Spent	Cash on hand
Maxwell Frost (D)	$3,835,169	$3,871,032	$1,055,862
Source: Federal Election Commission

==== Results ====
2026 Florida's 10th congressional district election
Party	Candidate	Votes	%	±%
Democratic	Maxwell Frost (incumbent)			
Total votes				

== District 11 ==
2026 Florida's 11th congressional district election
- Reporting: 99% as of Nov 9 at 5:51 PM EST

Nominee	Joe Strada	James Pericola
Party	Republican	Democratic
Popular vote	193,588	168,207
Percentage	52.9%	46.0%
U.S. Representative before election
Daniel Webster
Republican
Elected U.S. Representative
Joe Strada
Republican

Florida's 11th congressional district boundary from the 2026 elections Interactive map version

The incumbent is Republican Daniel Webster, who was re-elected with 60.4% of the vote in 2024.

=== Republican primary ===
==== Nominee ====
- Joe Strada, businessman

==== Eliminated in primary ====
- Carey Baker, former Lake County property appraiser and state senator
- Ivette Palomo, educator and farmer
- Nizam Razack, law professor and neurosurgeon
- Tim Wilkins, comedian

==== Withdrawn ====
- Anthony Sabatini, Lake County commissioner, candidate for the 7th district in 2022, and candidate for this district in 2024 (endorsed Baker)
- Daniel Webster, incumbent U.S. representative (endorsed Baker)

==== Endorsements ====
Carey Baker

U.S. representatives

- Daniel Webster, FL-11 (2011-present)

Local officials

- Anthony Sabatini, Lake County commissioner (2024–present) and former candidate for this district
Joe Strada

U.S. representatives

- Jim Jordan, OH-01 (2007–present)
- Steve Scalise, majority leader of the House of Representatives (2023–present) from LA-01 (2008–present)
- Randy Fine, FL-06 (2025–present)

Statewide officials

- James Uthmeier, attorney general of Florida (2025–present)

State legislators

- Doug Bankson, state representative from the 39th district (2022–present)
- Webster Barnaby, state representative from the 29th district (2020–present)
- Jason Brodeur, president pro tempore of the Florida Senate (2024–present) from the 10th district (2020–present)
- Nan Cobb, state representative from the 26th district (2024–present)
- Richard Gentry, state representative from the 27th district (2024–present)
- Keith Truenow, state senator from the 13th district (2024–present)
- Taylor Yarkosky, state representative from the 25th district (2022–present)

Local officials

- Bill Gladson, Florida's 5th Judicial Circuit state attorney
- Wayne Ivey, Brevard County Sheriff
- David Jordan, Lake County tax collector
- Mark Jordan, Lake County property appraiser
- Grady Judd, Polk County sheriff
- Keith Keogh, Groveland mayor
- Dennis Lemma, Seminole County sheriff
- Alison Strange, Clermont City Council member
- Don Wiley, Sumter County commissioner
Tim Wilkins

Executive branch officials

- Peter O'Rouke, former acting United States secretary of veterans affairs (2017)

U.S. representatives

- Jack Bergman, MI-01 (2017–present)

Local officials

- Chris Blackmon, Osceola County sheriff

Organizations

- Veterans for America First
Anthony Sabatini (withdrawn)

U.S. representatives

- Matt Gaetz, former FL-01 (2017–2024)
Mike Wilnau (failed to qualify)

Individuals

- James Fishback, investor and candidate in the 2026 Florida gubernatorial election

Organizations

- Anti-Zionist America PAC
Daniel Webster (withdrawn)

Executive branch officials

- Donald Trump, president of the United States (2017–2021, 2025–present)

Organizations

- AIPAC

==== Fundraising ====
Italics indicate a withdrawn candidate.

Campaign finance reports as of July 29, 2026
Candidate	Raised	Spent	Cash on hand
Carey Baker (R)	$303,575	$282,069	$21,506
Nizam Razack (R)	$932,552 (Note: $560,000 was self funded)	$768,564	$163,988
Joe Strada (R)	$5,248,640 (Note: $5,000,000 was self funded)	$2,999,737	$2,248,903
Daniel Webster (R)	$387,212	$385,954	$101,287
Tim Wilkins (R)	$329,215 (Note: $246,500 was self funded)	$204,668	$124,546
Source: Federal Election Commission

==== Forum ====
2026 Florida's 11th congressional district Republican primary candidate forum
No.	Date	Host	Moderator	Link	Republican	Republican	Republican	Republican	Republican
Key: P Participant A Absent N Not invited I Invited W Withdrawn									
Key: P Participant A Absent N Not invited I Invited W Withdrawn					Carey Baker	Ivette Palomo	Nizam Razack	Joe Strada	Tim Wilkins
1	Jul. 3, 2026	Sumter County Republican Party	Mark Morgan		P	P	P	P	P

==== Results ====
As the final margin was under 0.5%, a machine recount was announced.

Republican primary results
Party	Candidate	Votes	%
Republican	Joe Strada	27,389	33.5
Republican	Carey Baker	26,996	33.0
Republican	Tim Wilkins	20,810	25.4
Republican	Nizam Razack	4,742	5.8
Republican	Ivette Palomo	1,838	2.2
Total votes		81,775	100.0

=== Democratic primary ===
==== Nominee ====
- James Pericola, attorney

==== Eliminated in primary ====
- Royal Webster, coach
- Dan Williams, teacher

==== Withdrawn ====
- Barbie Harden Hall, paralegal and nominee for this district in 2024

==== Fundraising ====
Campaign finance reports as of June 30, 2026
Candidate	Raised	Spent	Cash on hand
James Pericola (D)	$116,424 (Note: $64,965 was self funded)	$13,749	$102,675
Barbie Harden Hall (D)	$23,989	$21,490	$10,581
Royal Webster (D)	$15,900	$14,856	$2,100
Source: Federal Election Commission

==== Polling ====
Poll source	Date(s) administered	Sample size	Margin of error	James Pericola	Royal Webster	Dan Williams	Undecided
MDW Communications (D) (Note: Poll sponsored by Pericola's campaign)	July 28–29, 2026	553 (LV)	—	33%	7%	5%	55%

==== Results ====
Democratic primary results
Party	Candidate	Votes	%
Democratic	James Pericola	20,833	46.3
Democratic	Royal Webster	12,356	27.5
Democratic	Dan Williams	11,759	26.2
Total votes		44,948	100.0

=== Libertarian primary ===
==== Nominee ====
- Ralph Groves, defense analyst

=== General election ===
==== Predictions ====
Source	Ranking	As of
Decision Desk HQ	Likely R	July 14, 2026
The Cook Political Report	Solid R	February 6, 2025
Inside Elections	Solid R	May 5, 2026
Sabato's Crystal Ball	Safe R	April 10, 2025
The Economist	Lean R	May 6, 2026

==== Post-primary endorsements ====
Joe Strada (R)

Executive branch officials

- Donald Trump, 45th and 47th president of the United States (2017–2021, 2025–present)

Statewide officials

- Ron DeSantis, governor of Florida (2019–present)

==== Fundraising ====
Campaign finance reports as of October 14, 2026
Candidate	Raised	Spent	Cash on hand
Joe Strada (R)	$5,512,075	$4,652,008	$860,068
James Pericola (D)	$225,868	$190,672	$35,196
Source: Federal Election Commission

==== Polling ====
Poll source	Date(s) administered	Sample size	Margin of error	Joe Strada (R)	James Pericola (D)	Undecided
MDW Communications (D)	July 28–29, 2026	(LV)	—	42%	42%	16%

==== Pre-primary candidate conversation ====
2022 Florida's 11th congressional district pre-primary candidate conversation
No.	Date	Host	Moderator	Link	Republican	Libertarian	Republican	Democratic	Republican	Republican	Democratic	Republican	Democratic
Key: P Participant A Absent N Not invited I Invited W Withdrawn													
Key: P Participant A Absent N Not invited I Invited W Withdrawn					Carey Baker	Ralph Groves	Ivette Palomo	James Pericola	Nizam Razack	Joe Strada	Royal Webster II	Tim Wilkins	Dan Williams
1	Jul. 22, 2026	Bay News 9 Spectrum News 13; AARP	Ybeth Bruzual; Holly Gregory		P	P	P	P	P	N	P	P	P

==== Results ====
2026 Florida's 11th congressional district election
Party	Candidate	Votes	%	±%
Republican	Joe Strada			
Democratic	James Pericola			
Libertarian	Ralph Groves			
Total votes				

== District 12 ==
2026 Florida's 12th congressional district election
- Reporting: 99% as of Nov 9 at 5:51 PM EST
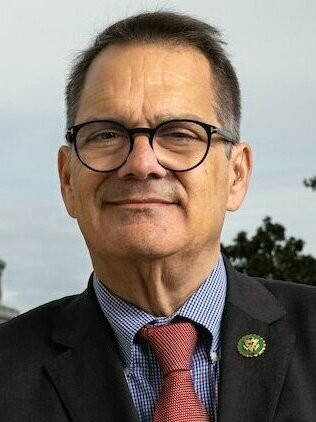

Nominee	Gus Bilirakis	Kimberly Overman
Party	Republican	Democratic
Popular vote	150,869	131,435
Percentage	52.7%	45.9%
U.S. Representative before election
Gus Bilirakis
Republican
Elected U.S. Representative
Gus Bilirakis
Republican

Florida's 12th congressional district boundary from the 2026 elections Interactive map version

The incumbent is Republican Gus Bilirakis, who was re-elected with 71.0% of the vote in 2024.

=== Republican primary ===
==== Nominee ====
- Gus Bilirakis, incumbent U.S. representative

==== Withdrawn ====
- Samantha June

==== Endorsements ====
Gus Bilirakis

Executive branch officials

- Donald Trump, 45th and 47th president of the United States (2017–2021, 2025–present)

Labor unions

- Associated Builders and Contractors Florida Gulf Coast Chapter

Organizations

- AIPAC
- U.S. Chamber of Commerce

==== Fundraising ====
Campaign finance reports as of June 30, 2026
Candidate	Raised	Spent	Cash on hand
Gus Bilirakis (R)	$1,489,323	$1,023,880	$586,860
Source: Federal Election Commission

=== Democratic primary ===
==== Nominee ====
- Kimberly Overman, former Hillsborough County commissioner (previously ran in the 15th district)

==== Eliminated in primary ====
- Darren McAuley, former state air surgeon for the Florida Air National Guard (previously ran in the 15th district)

==== Withdrawn ====
- Chris Irizarry, retired CIA officer and U.S. Army veteran (ran in the 15th district)

==== Endorsements ====
Darren McAuley

Executive branch officials

- Pete Buttigieg, former United States secretary of transportation (2021–2025)
- Alex Vindman, former director of European affairs for the National Security Council (2018–2020)

U.S. representatives

- Jason Crow, CO-06 (2019–present)
- Hank Johnson, GA-04 (2007–present)

Organizations

- VoteVets
Kimberly Overman

Organizaitons

- Democratic Progressive Caucus of Florida
- Emgage Action
- National Women's Political Caucus

==== Fundraising ====
Campaign finance reports as of June 30, 2026
Candidate	Raised	Spent	Cash on hand
Darren McAuley (D)	$683,789	$441,981	$241,809
Kimberly Overman (D)	$175,655	$170,103	$9,552
Source: Federal Election Commission

==== Results ====
Democratic primary results
Party	Candidate	Votes	%
Democratic	Kimberly Overman	21,833	52.7
Democratic	Darren McAuley	19,626	47.3
Total votes		41,459	100.0

=== Independents ===
==== Declared ====
- Branden Scrivener

=== General election ===
==== Predictions ====
Source	Ranking	As of
Decision Desk HQ	Likely R	July 14, 2026
The Cook Political Report	Solid R	February 6, 2025
Inside Elections	Solid R	May 5, 2026
Sabato's Crystal Ball	Likely R	May 4, 2026
The Economist	Likely R	May 6, 2026

==== Post-primary endorsements ====
Gus Bilirakis (R)

Sheriffs

- Chad Chronister, Hillsborough County sheriff
- Chris Nocco, Pasco County sheriff
Kimberly Overman (D)

U.S. representatives

- Suzan DelBene, WA-01 (2012–present)

Party officials

- Ken Martin, chair of the Democratic National Committee (2025–present)

==== Fundraising ====
Campaign finance reports as of October 14, 2026
Candidate	Raised	Spent	Cash on hand
Gus Bilirakis (R)	$2,255,342	$2,122,513	$254,246
Kimberly Overman (D)	$280,118	$250,591	$29,526
Source: Federal Election Commission

==== Polling ====
Hypothetical polling

Gus Bilirakis vs. Darren McAuley

Poll source	Date(s) administered	Sample size	Margin of error	Gus Bilirakis (R)	Darren McAuley (D)	Undecided
Public Policy Polling (D) (Note: Poll sponsored by McAuley's campaign)	June 26–27, 2026	594 (RV)	± 4.0%	42%	40%	18%

==== Results ====
2026 Florida's 8th congressional district election
Party	Candidate	Votes	%	±%
Republican	Gus Bilirakis (incumbent)			
Democratic	Kimberly Overman			
Independent	Branden Scrivener			
Total votes				

== District 13 ==
2026 Florida's 13th congressional district election
- Reporting: 99% as of Nov 9 at 5:51 PM EST
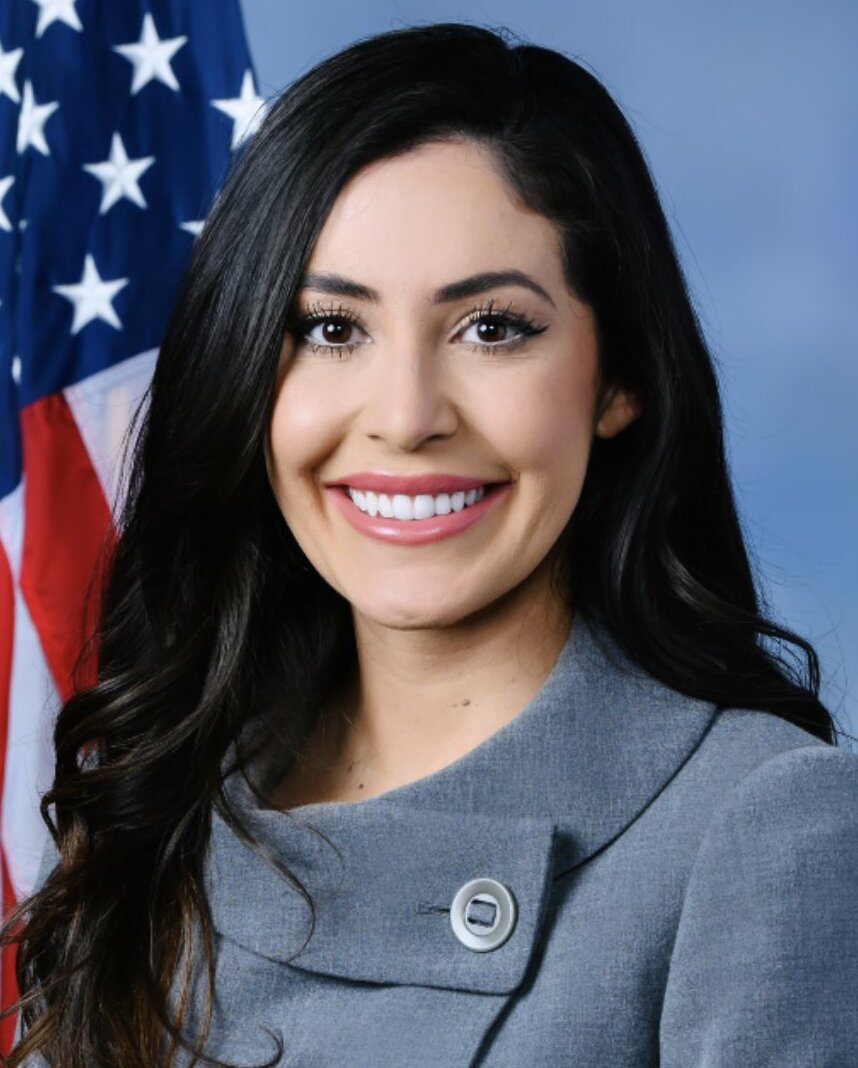

Nominee	Anna Paulina Luna	Leela Gray
Party	Republican	Democratic
Popular vote	155,189	152,698
Percentage	49.5%	48.7%
U.S. Representative before election
Anna Paulina Luna
Republican
Elected U.S. Representative
Anna Paulina Luna
Republican

Florida's 13th congressional district boundary from the 2026 elections Interactive map version

The incumbent is Republican Anna Paulina Luna, who was re-elected with 54.8% of the vote in 2024.

=== Republican primary ===
==== Nominee ====
- Anna Paulina Luna, incumbent U.S. representative

==== Withdrawn ====
- Amaro Lionheart, actor

==== Declined ====
- Eddie Speir, former New College of Florida trustee and candidate for the 16th district in 2024 (ran in the 16th district)

==== Endorsements ====
Anna Paulina Luna

Executive branch officials

- Donald Trump, president of the United States (2017–2021, 2025–present)

State legislators

- Berny Jacques, HD-59 (2022–present)

Local officials

- Kathleen Peters, Pinellas County commissioner (2019–present)

Labor unions

- Associated Builders and Contractors Florida Gulf Coast Chapter

Organizations

- AIPAC
- Club for Growth PAC
- Log Cabin Republicans

==== Fundraising ====
Campaign finance reports as of July 29, 2026
Candidate	Raised	Spent	Cash on hand
Anna Paulina Luna (R)	$3,233,312	$1,890,603	$1,474,124
Source: Federal Election Commission

=== Democratic primary ===
==== Nominee ====
- Leela Gray, retired U.S. Army brigadier general

==== Eliminated in primary ====
- John Liccione
- Timothy Brandt Robinson, history teacher

==== Withdrawn ====
- Earle Ford, attorney and U.S. Army veteran (ran for chief financial officer)
- Karla Kemp, sustainability consultant (running for state senate)
- Susan Leff
- Jeff Moore, entrepreneur
- Reggie Paros, senior director at the Environmental Defense Fund

==== Endorsements ====
Leela Gray

Executive branch officials

- Pete Buttigieg, former secretary of transportation (2021–2025)

U.S. senators

- Mark Kelly, Arizona (2020–present)

U.S. representatives

- Kathy Castor, FL-14 (2007–present)
- Jason Crow, CO-06 (2019–present)
- Jim Davis, former FL-11 (1997–2007)
- Lois Frankel, FL-22 (2013–present)
- Adam Gray, CA-13 (2025–present)
- Steny Hoyer, MD-05 (1981–present)
- Ted Lieu, CA-36 (2015–present)
- Pat Ryan, NY-18 (2022–present)

Statewide officials

- Alex Sink, former chief financial officer of Florida (2007–2011)

State legislators

- Ben Diamond, former HD-68 (2016–2022)

Individuals

- Paul Eaton, former deputy chief of staff for the U.S. Army Training and Doctrine Command

Labor unions

- Florida AFL-CIO
- West Central Florida Labor Council

Organizations

- Blue Dog PAC
- EMILYs List
- Natural Resources Defense Council Action Fund
- VoteVets
Timothy Brandt Robinson

Individuals

- Jeff Kinney, author

==== Fundraising ====
Italics indicate a withdrawn candidate.

Campaign finance reports as of June 29, 2026
Candidate	Raised	Spent	Cash on hand
John Fay (D)	$3,730	$2,362	$0
Earle Ford (D)	$569,489	$553,304	$16,185
Leela Gray (D)	$1,223,069	$538,774	$683,295
Karla Kemp (D)	$10,639	$8,589	$1,573
Reggie Paros (D)	$15,864	$15,864	$0
Timothy Brandt Robinson (D)	$106,026	$98,333	$7,693
Source: Federal Election Commission

==== Results ====
Democratic primary results
Party	Candidate	Votes	%
Democratic	Leela Gray	32,705	65.0
Democratic	Timothy Brandt Robinson	13,279	26.4
Democratic	John Liccione	4,327	8.6
Total votes		50,311	100.0

=== Independents ===
==== Declared ====
- Tony D'Arrigo, small business owner

=== General election ===
==== Predictions ====
Source	Ranking	As of
Decision Desk HQ	Lean R	October 29, 2026
The Cook Political Report	Lean R	October 30, 2026
Inside Elections	Lean R	October 29, 2026
Sabato's Crystal Ball	Lean R	October 27, 2026
The Economist	Lean R	October 29, 2026

==== Post-primary endorsements ====
Leela Gray (D)

Statewide officials

- Abigail Spanberger, governor of Virginia (2026–present)

U.S. representatives

- Suzan DelBene, WA-01 (2012–present)

Labor unions

- United Auto Workers

Organizations

- Alliance for Retired Americans
- DCCC Red to Blue
- League of Conservation Voters Action Fund
- MoveOn
Anna Paulina Luna (R)

Organizations

- MAHA Action
- MAHA PAC

==== Fundraising ====
Campaign finance reports as of October 14, 2026
Candidate	Raised	Spent	Cash on hand
Anna Paulina Luna (R)	$4,351,792	$3,736,252	$746,955
Leela Gray (D)	$2,917,665	$2,261,242	$656,423
Source: Federal Election Commission

==== Polling ====
Poll source	Date(s) administered	Sample size	Margin of error	Anna Paulina Luna (R)	Leela Gray (D)	Other	Undecided
RedBox Research (D) (Note: Poll sponsored by A Fight Worth Having PAC)	October 20–23, 2026	875 (LV)	± 4.0%	48%	45%	4% (Note: Tony D'Arrigo (I) with 2%; "Prefer not to answer" & "Someone else" with 1%)	3%
Public Policy Polling (D) (Note: Poll sponsored by House Majority PAC, which is focused on electing Democrats to the U.S. House of Representatives)	October 14–15, 2026	603 (LV)	–	46%	47%	–	7%
Hart Research Associates (D)	August 25–27, 2026	500 (LV)	± 4.4%	46%	51%	–	3%
Hart Research Associates (D)	August 25–27, 2026	500 (LV)	± 4.4%	43%	44%	7% (Note: Tony D'Arrigo (I) with 7%)	6%
Fabrizio, Lee & Associates (R) (Note: Poll sponsored by Luna's campaign)	August 4–6, 2026	400 (LV)	± 4.9%	49%	41%	–	10%
GQR (D) (Note: Poll sponsored by Gray's campaign)	August 4–6, 2026	500 (LV)	± 4.38%	47%	44%	4% (Note: Tony D'Arrigo (I) with 4%)	6%
Public Policy Polling (D)	May 19–20, 2026	616 (RV)	± 4.0%	41%	39%	–	20%

Hypothetical polling

Poll source	Date(s) administered	Sample size	Margin of error	Generic Republican	Generic Democrat	Undecided
Hart Research Associates (D)	August 25–27, 2026	500 (LV)	± 4.4%	44%	49%	7%

==== Results ====
2026 Florida's 13th congressional district election
Party	Candidate	Votes	%	±%
Republican	Anna Paulina Luna (incumbent)			
Democratic	Leela Gray			
Independent	Tony D'Arrigo			
Total votes				

== District 14 ==
2026 Florida's 14th congressional district election
- Reporting: 99% as of Nov 9 at 5:46 PM EST
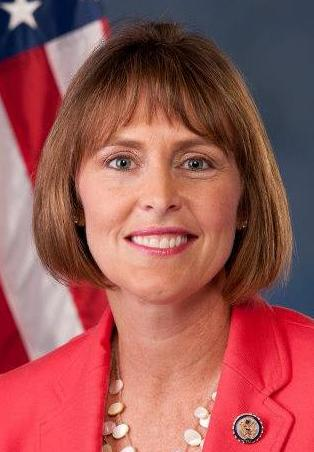

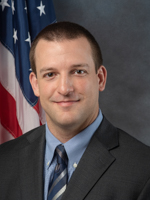
Nominee	Kathy Castor	Mike Beltran
Party	Democratic	Republican
Popular vote	153,785	137,702
Percentage	51.2%	45.9%
- Results by precinct Castor: 40–50% 50–60% 60–70% 70–80% 80–90% >90% Beltran: 40–50% 50–60% 60–70% 70–80% 80–90% Tie: 40–50%
U.S. Representative before election
Kathy Castor
Democratic
Elected U.S. Representative
Kathy Castor
Democratic

Florida's 14th congressional district boundary from the 2026 elections Interactive map version

The incumbent is Democrat Kathy Castor, who was re-elected with 56.9% of the vote in 2024.

=== Democratic primary ===
==== Nominee ====
- Kathy Castor, incumbent U.S. representative

==== Endorsements ====
Kathy Castor

Labor unions

- AFGE
- Florida AFL-CIO
- United Auto Workers

Organizations

- AIPAC
- EMILYs List
- League of Conservation Voters Action Fund
- Planned Parenthood Action Fund
- Sierra Club

==== Fundraising ====
Campaign finance reports as of June 30, 2026
Candidate	Raised	Spent	Cash on hand
Kathy Castor (D)	$1,954,817	$679,785	$1,501,762
Source: Federal Election Commission

=== Republican primary ===
==== Nominee ====
- Mike Beltran, former state representative from the 70th district (2018–2024)

==== Eliminated in primary ====
- Michael Marcel, former wall street analyst
- John Peters, business owner and candidate for this district in 2024 (previously ran in the 16th district)
- Robert "Rocky" Rochford, retired U.S. Navy captain and nominee for this district in 2024
- Gavriel Soriano, brewery operator and candidate for Florida's 11th congressional district in 2022
- Kevin Steele, former state representative from the 55th district (2022–2026) (previously ran for chief financial officer)
- Ergin "Batman" Tek, restaurant owner
- Bea Valenti, former domestic policy advisor to U.S. Senator Ashley Moody

==== Withdrawn ====
- Reginald Strachan
- Dan Weldon, attorney and former chair of the Florida College Republicans (running for state representative)
- John Wick, veteran

==== Declined ====
- Jay Collins, lieutenant governor of Florida (2025–present) and candidate for this district in 2022 (ran for governor)
- Laurel Lee, incumbent U.S. representative from the 15th district (running for re-election)
- Anna Paulina Luna, incumbent U.S. representative from the 13th district (running in the 13th district)
- Eddie Speir, former New College of Florida trustee and candidate for the 16th district in 2024 (ran in the 16th district)

==== Endorsements ====
Mike Beltran

U.S. representatives

- Gus Bilirakis, FL-12 (2007–present)
- Greg Steube, FL-17 (2019–present)

State legislators

- Jeff Brandes, former state senator from the 24th district (2012–2022)
- Wyman Duggan, speaker pro tempore of the Florida House of Representatives (2024–present) from the 12th district (2018–present)
- Sam Killebrew, former state representative from the 48th district (2016–2024)
- Tom Lee, former president of the Florida Senate (2004–2006) from the 20th district (1996–2006, 2012–2020)
- Patt Maney, state representative from the 4th district (2020–present)
- Fiona McFarland, state representative from the 73rd district (2020–present)
- Spencer Roach, former state representative from the 76th district (2018–2024)
- Rick Roth, former state representative from the 94th district (2016–2024)
- Tyler Sirois, majority leader of the Florida House of Representatives (2024–present) from the 31st district (2018–present)
- Paula Stark, state representative from the 47th district (2022–present)
- Ronda Storms, former state senator from the 10th district (2006–2012)

Organizations

- Gun Owners of America
- Republican Liberty Caucus
Kevin Steele

Statewide officials

- Blaise Ingoglia, chief financial officer of Florida (2025–present)
- Wilton Simpson, Florida commissioner of agriculture (2023–present)
- James Uthmeier, attorney general of Florida (2025–present)

State legislators

- Danny Burgess, state senator from the 20th district (2020–present)
- Jennifer Canady, state representative from the 50th district (2022–present)
- Sam Garrison, state representative from the 11th district (2020–present)
- Lawrence McClure, state representative from the 68th district (2017–present)
- Karen Gonzalez Pittman, state representative from the 65th district (2022–present)
- Mike Redondo, state representative from the 118th district (2023–present)

Local officials

- Chad Chronister, Hillsborough County sheriff (2017–present)
- Grady Judd, Polk County sheriff (2005–present)
- Chris Nocco, Pasco County sheriff

Labor unions

- Associated Builders and Contractors Florida Gulf Coast Chapter

Organizations

- U.S. Chamber of Commerce
Bea Valenti

U.S. representatives

- Neal Dunn, FL-2 (2017–present)
- Mike Ezell, MS-4 (2023–present)
- Morgan Luttrell, TX-08 (2023-present)

Organizations

- Maggie's List
Dan Weldon (withdrawn)

State legislators

- Juan Carlos Porras, state representative from the 119th district (2022–present)

==== Fundraising ====
Italics indicate a withdrawn candidate.

Campaign finance reports as of July 29, 2026
Candidate	Raised	Spent	Cash on hand
Mike Beltran (R)	$2,116,747 (Note: $2,014,000 was self funded)	$176,884	$1,939,864
John Peters (R)	$200,797 (Note: $155,649 was self funded)	$199,152	$1,646
Rocky Rochford (R)	$266,796 (Note: $150,000 was self funded)	$164,168	$104,807
Gavriel Soriano (R) (Note: As of March 31, 2026)	$1,658 (Note: $1,658 was self funded)	$1,633	$25
Kevin Steele (R)	$2,588,952 (Note: $2,500,000 was self funded)	$2,106,349	$482,602
Ergin Tek (R)	$41,572 (Note: $40,450 was self funded)	$40,413	$1,159
Bea Valenti (R)	$220,095	$116,111	$103,984
Dan Weldon (R)	$76,649	$9,550	$67,099
John Wick (R)	$7,089	$7,089	$0
Shay Williams (R)	$18,392	$7,677	$10,715
Source: Federal Election Commission

==== Debate ====
2026 Florida's 14th congressional district Republican primary debate
No.	Date	Host	Link	Republican	Republican	Republican	Republican	Republican	Republican	Republican	Republican
Key: P Participant A Absent N Not invited I Invited W Withdrawn											
Key: P Participant A Absent N Not invited I Invited W Withdrawn				Mike Beltran	Michael Marcel	John Peters	Robert Rochford	Gavriel Soriano	Kevin Steele	Ergin Tek	Bea Valenti
1	June 16, 2026	Hillsborough County Republican Party; Tampa Bay Young Republicans	YouTube	P	A	P	P	P	A	P	P

==== Polling ====
Poll source	Date(s) administered	Sample size	Margin of error	Mike Beltran	Robert Rochford	Kevin Steele	Bea Valenti	Other	Undecided
Catalyst Research (Note: Poll sponsored by Beltran's campaign)	August 6–8, 2026	556 (LV)	± 4.4%	39%	7%	33%	12%	10% (Note: John Peters and Ergin Tek with 3%; Michael Marcel and Gavriel Soriano with 2%)	–
Catalyst Research	August 6–8, 2026	556 (LV)	± 4.4%	29%	4%	26%	8%	5% (Note: Ergin Tek with 2%; Michael Marcel, John Peters, and Gavriel Soriano with 1%)	29%
Victory Insights (R)	August 4–6, 2026	1,200 (LV)	–	23%	1%	32%	8%	4% (Note: Ergin Tek with 2%; John Peters and Gavriel Soriano with 1%)	33%
St. Pete Polls	July 14–15, 2026	376 (LV)	± 5.1%	30%	1%	18%	2%	3% (Note: John Peters with 2%; Ergin Tek with 1%; Michael Marcel and Gavriel Soriano with 0%)	46%

==== Results ====
Republican primary results
Party	Candidate	Votes	%
Republican	Mike Beltran	25,866	45.6
Republican	Kevin Steele	17,140	30.2
Republican	Bea Valenti	5,430	9.6
Republican	Robert "Rocky" Rochford	4,046	7.1
Republican	John Peters	1,573	2.8
Republican	Michael Marcel	1,016	1.8
Republican	Ergin "Batman" Tek	970	1.7
Republican	Gavriel Soriano	693	1.2
Total votes		56,734	100.0

=== Third party and independents ===
- Brian Lambert (Libertarian)
- Salomon Hernandez Sr. (Independent) (write-in)
- Keith Varian (Independent)(write-in)

=== General election ===
==== Predictions ====
Source	Ranking	As of
Decision Desk HQ	Lean D	October 29, 2026
The Cook Political Report	Tossup	October 30, 2026
Inside Elections	Tilt D	October 29, 2026
Sabato's Crystal Ball	Lean D	November 2, 2026
The Economist	Lean D	October 29, 2026

==== Post-primary endorsements ====
Kathy Castor (D)

Labor unions

- National Education Association

Organizations

- Giffords
- Jewish Democratic Council of America
Mike Beltran (R)

Executive branch officials

- Donald Trump, 45th and 47th president of the United States (2017–2021, 2025–present)

U.S. representatives

- Richard Hudson, NC-09 (2013–present)
- David McIntosh, former IN-2 (1995–2001)

Statewide officials

- Ron DeSantis, governor of Florida (2019–present)

Organizations

- Club for Growth PAC
- Freedom Caucus Fund
- NRCC MAGA Majority

==== Fundraising ====
Campaign finance reports as of October 14, 2026
Candidate	Raised	Spent	Cash on hand
Kathy Castor (D)	$4,930,537	$4,579,832	$577,435
Mike Beltran (R)	$2,731,428	$999,910	$1,731,518
Source: Federal Election Commission

==== Polling ====
Poll source	Date(s) administered	Sample size	Margin of error	Kathy Castor (D)	Mike Beltran (R)	Undecided
Emerson College (Note: Poll sponsored by Poll Vault)	October 12–14, 2026	315 (LV)	–	48%	43%	9%
St. Pete Polls	July 14–15, 2026	469 (LV)	± 4.5%	46%	38%	16%

Hypothetical polling

Kathy Castor vs. Kevin Steele

Poll source	Date(s) administered	Sample size	Margin of error	Kathy Castor (D)	Kevin Steele (R)	Undecided
St. Pete Polls	July 14–15, 2026	469 (LV)	± 4.5%	46%	39%	15%

==== Debates ====
2026 Florida's 14th congressional district debates
No.	Date	Host	Moderator	Link	Democratic	Republican
Key: P Participant A Absent N Not invited I Invited W Withdrawn						
Key: P Participant A Absent N Not invited I Invited W Withdrawn					Kathy Castor	Mike Beltran
1	Oct. 2, 2026	WMNF			I	I
2	Oct. 16, 2026	Tiger Bay at the Cuban Club			I	I

==== Results ====
2026 Florida's 14th congressional district election
Party	Candidate	Votes	%	±%
Democratic	Kathy Castor (incumbent)			
Republican	Mike Beltran			
Libertarian	Brian Lambert			
Total votes				

== District 15 ==
2026 Florida's 15th congressional district election
- Reporting: 99% as of Nov 9 at 5:51 PM EST
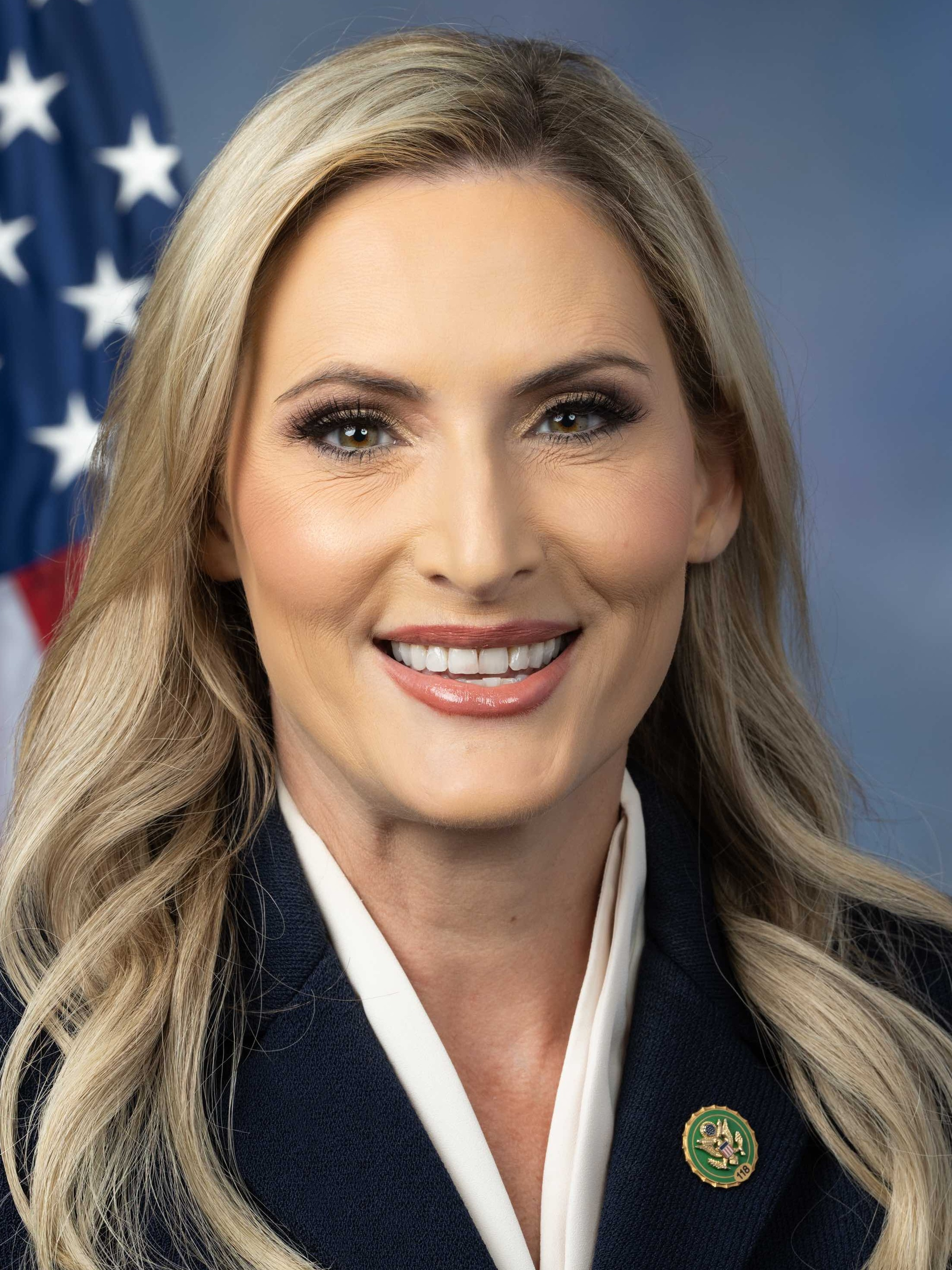

Nominee	Laurel Lee	Robert People
Party	Republican	Democratic
Popular vote	163,372	137,535
Percentage	54.3%	45.7%
U.S. Representative before election
Laurel Lee
Republican
Elected U.S. Representative
Laurel Lee
Republican

Florida's 15th congressional district boundary from the 2026 elections Interactive map version

The incumbent is Republican Laurel Lee, who was re-elected with 56.2% of the vote in 2024.

=== Republican primary ===
==== Nominee ====
- Laurel Lee, incumbent U.S. representative

==== Withdrawn ====
- Steve Champion, Hernando County commissioner

==== Endorsements ====
Laurel Lee

Executive branch officials

- Donald Trump, president of the United States (2017–2021; 2025–present)

Labor unions

- Associated Builders and Contractors Florida Gulf Coast Chapter

Organizations

- AIPAC
- ClearPath Foundation
- Maggie's List

==== Fundraising ====
Campaign finance reports as of June 30, 2026
Candidate	Raised	Spent	Cash on hand
Laurel Lee (R)	$2,289,998	$781,113	$1,943,656
Source: Federal Election Commission

=== Democratic primary ===
==== Nominee ====
- Robert People, retired U.S. Army veteran and writer

==== Eliminated in primary ====
- Chris Irizarry, retired CIA officer, U.S. Army veteran, and vice president of the Pasco Democratic Public Education Caucus (previously ran in the 12th district)

==== Withdrawn ====
- Darren McAuley, former state air surgeon for the Florida Air National Guard (ran in the 12th district)
- Kimberly Overman, former Hillsborough County commissioner (running in the 12th district)

==== Endorsements ====
Robert People

Organizations

- Democratic Progressive Caucus of Florida

==== Fundraising ====
Campaign finance reports as of March 31, 2026
Candidate	Raised	Spent	Cash on hand
Chris Irizarry (D)	$20,417	$10,419	$9,998
Robert People (D)	$38,496 (Note: $17,672 was self funded)	$36,570	$1,926
Source: Federal Election Commission

==== Results ====
Democratic primary results
Party	Candidate	Votes	%
Democratic	Robert People	22,213	53.6
Democratic	Chris Irizarry	19,196	46.4
Total votes		41,409	100.0

=== Independents ===
==== Declared ====
- Angie Boone (write-in)

=== General election ===
==== Predictions ====
Source	Ranking	As of
Decision Desk HQ	Likely R	July 14, 2026
The Cook Political Report	Solid R	February 6, 2025
Inside Elections	Solid R	May 5, 2026
Sabato's Crystal Ball	Safe R	April 10, 2025
The Economist	Safe R	May 6, 2026

==== Post-primary endorsements ====
Laurel Lee (R)

Sheriffs

- Chad Chronister, Hillsborough County sheriff
- Al Nienhius, Hernando County sheriff
- Chris Nocco, Pasco County sheriff
- David Vincent, Citrus County sheriff

Organizations

- U.S. Chamber of Commerce
Robert People (D)

Organizations

- Track AIPAC

==== Fundraising ====
Campaign finance reports as of October 14, 2026
Candidate	Raised	Spent	Cash on hand
Laurel Lee (R)	$2,711,189	$1,825,503	$1,320,456
Robert People (D)	$82,518	$55,894	$26,625
Source: Federal Election Commission

==== Results ====
2026 Florida's 15th congressional district election
Party	Candidate	Votes	%	±%
Republican	Laurel Lee (incumbent)			
Democratic	Robert People			
Total votes				

== District 16 ==
2026 Florida's 16th congressional district election
- Reporting: 99% as of Nov 9 at 5:52 PM EST
Nominee	Sydney Gruters	Kelly Kirschner
Party	Republican	Democratic
Popular vote	175,650	161,113
Percentage	51.2%	47.0%
U.S. Representative before election
Vern Buchanan
Republican
Elected U.S. Representative
Sydney Gruters
Republican

Florida's 16th congressional district boundary from the 2026 elections Interactive map version

The incumbent is Republican Vern Buchanan, who was re-elected with 59.5% of the vote in 2024. On January 27, 2026, Buchanan announced that he would not run for re-election.

=== Republican primary ===
==== Nominee ====
- Sydney Gruters, former executive director of the New College of Florida Foundation and wife of state senator and chair of the Republican National Committee Joe Gruters

==== Eliminated in primary ====
- Edward Pope, businessman and Navy veteran
- Eddie Speir, former New College of Florida trustee and candidate for this district in 2024

==== Withdrawn ====
- John Peters, business owner and candidate for the 14th district in 2024 (ran in the 16th district)

==== Declined ====
- Jim Boyd, majority leader of the Florida Senate (2024–present) from the 20th district (2020–present)
- James Buchanan, state representative from the 73rd district (2020–present) and son of incumbent Vern Buchanan (running for state senate)
- Vern Buchanan, incumbent U.S. representative
- Jay Collins, lieutenant governor of Florida (2025–present) and candidate for the 14th district in 2022 (ran for governor)
- Richard Corcoran, president of the New College of Florida (2023–present) (endorsed Gruters)
- Mark Flanagan, former state representative (1994–2002) and chair of the Manatee County Republican Party
- Joe Gruters, state senator from the 22nd district (2018–present) and chair of the Republican National Committee (2025–present) (previously ran for chief financial officer)
- Anna Paulina Luna, incumbent U.S. representative from the 13th district (running in the 13th district)
- Kristen Truong, lobbyist (ran for state representative; would not run if Gruters did)

==== Endorsements ====
Sydney Gruters

Executive branch officials

- Donald Trump, 45th and 47th president of the United States (2017–2021, 2025–present) (previously endorsed Buchanan)

U.S. senators

- Rick Scott, United States senator from Florida (2019–present)

U.S. representatives

- Tom Emmer, majority whip of the House of Representatives (2023–present) from MN-06 (2015–present)
- Mike Johnson, speaker of the House of Representatives (2023–present) from LA-04 (2017–present)
- Jim Jordan, OH-04 (2007–present)
- Lisa McClain, MI-09 (2021–present)
- Anna Paulina Luna, FL-13 (2023–present)
- Steve Scalise, majority leader of the House of Representatives (2023–present) from LA-01 (2008–present)

Local officials

- Chad Chronister, Hillsborough County sheriff (2017–present)
- Vent Crawford, Hardee County sheriff
- Bob Gualtieri, Pinellas County sheriff (2011–present)
- Kurt Hoffman, Sarasota County sheriff
- Grady Judd, Polk County sheriff (2005–present)
- Jim Potter, DeSoto County sheriff
- Rick Wells, Manatee County sheriff

Individuals

- Richard Corcoran, president of the New College of Florida (2023–present)

Labor unions

- Associated Builders and Contractors Florida Gulf Coast Chapter
- Hardee County Professional Firefighters
- St. Petersburg Firefighters Association
- Suncoast Professional Firefighters and Paramedics

Organizations

- Maggie's List
- National Rifle Association Political Victory Fund
- Turning Point Action
Eddie Speir

Organizations

- Republican Liberty Caucus
Vern Buchanan (declined)

Executive branch officials

- ~~Donald Trump, 45th and 47th president of the United States (2017–2021, 2025–present)~~ (later endorsed Sydney Gruters)

Organizations

- AIPAC
Joe Gruters (declined)

U.S. representatives

- Randy Fine, FL-06 (2025–present)

==== Debate ====
2026 Florida's 16th congressional district Republican primary debate
No.	Date	Host	Moderator	Link	Republican	Republican	Republican
Key: P Participant A Absent N Not invited I Invited W Withdrawn							
Key: P Participant A Absent N Not invited I Invited W Withdrawn					Sydney Gruters	Ed Pope	Eddie Speir
1	June 19, 2026	Tiger Bay Club of Manatee County	Xtavia Bailey; Jamie Smith	YouTube	A	P	P
2	July 31, 2026	Republican Women's Club of Sarasota		YouTube	P	P	P

==== Polling ====
Poll source	Date(s) administered	Sample size	Margin of error	Sydney Gruters	Ed Pope	Eddie Speir	Undecided
St. Pete Polls	May 11–12, 2026	441 (LV)	± 4.7%	49%	7%	13%	32%

==== Fundraising ====
Campaign finance reports as of July 29, 2026
Candidate	Raised	Spent	Cash on hand
Sydney Gruters (R)	$1,087,683	$465,301	$622,381
Edward Pope (R)	$49,248 (Note: $48,940 was self funded)	$22,465	$26,783
Eddie Speir (R)	$44,245	$30,939	$13,967
Source: Federal Election Commission

==== Results ====
Republican primary results
Party	Candidate	Votes	%
Republican	Sydney Gruters	48,570	63.4
Republican	Eddie Speir	16,291	21.3
Republican	Ed Pope	11,692	15.3
Total votes		76,553	100.0

=== Democratic primary ===
==== Nominee ====
- Kelly Kirschner, former mayor of Sarasota

==== Eliminated in primary ====
- Jon Harris, U.S. Army veteran
- Tamika Lyles, nonprofit founder and candidate for Florida's 43rd House of Representatives district in 2020 (previously ran for U.S. senate)
- Glenn Pearson, small business owner and candidate for Manatee County commission in 2024
- Jan Schneider, perennial candidate, attorney, and nominee for this district in 2016, 2022, and 2024

==== Endorsements ====
Kelly Kirschner

Local officials

- Rick Kriseman, former mayor of St. Petersburg (2014–2022)

Labor unions

- Florida AFL-CIO

==== Fundraising ====
Campaign finance reports as of July 29, 2026
Candidate	Raised	Spent	Cash on hand
Jon Harris (D)	$85,555 (Note: $52,074 was self funded)	$56,687	$28,868
Kelly Kirschner (D)	$296,507	$215,769	$80,738
Tamika Lyles (D)	$122,215	$66,934	$55,280
Glenn Pearson (D)	$47,645	$43,650	$5,318
Jan Schneider (D)	$56,078	$22,492	$74,505
Source: Federal Election Commission

==== Debate ====
2026 Florida's 16th congressional district Democratic primary debate
No.	Date	Host	Moderator	Link	Democratic	Democratic	Democratic	Democratic	Democratic
Key: P Participant A Absent N Not invited I Invited W Withdrawn									
Key: P Participant A Absent N Not invited I Invited W Withdrawn					Jon Harris	Kelly Kirschner	Tamika Lyles	Glenn Pearson	Jan Schneider
1	June 18, 2026	League of Women Voters of Manatee County	Renee James Gilmore	YouTube	P	P	P	P	P

==== Results ====
Democratic primary results
Party	Candidate	Votes	%
Democratic	Kelly Kirschner	23,488	43.0
Democratic	Tamika Lyles	10,888	19.9
Democratic	Jan Schneider	8,423	15.4
Democratic	Jon Harris	6,856	12.5
Democratic	Glenn Pearson	5,002	9.2
Total votes		54,657	100.0

=== Independents ===
==== Declared ====
- Mark Davis, U.S. Air Force veteran

==== Withdrawn ====
- Anthony DeRibas, former USPS worker

=== General election ===
==== Predictions ====
Source	Ranking	As of
Decision Desk HQ	Lean R	November 3, 2026
The Cook Political Report	Likely R	October 16, 2026
Inside Elections	Likely R	September 17, 2026
Sabato's Crystal Ball	Likely R	May 4, 2026
The Economist	Lean R	May 6, 2026

==== Post-primary endorsements ====
Sydney Gruters (R)

Statewide officials

- Ron DeSantis, governor of Florida (2019–present)
Kelly Kirschner (D)

Labor unions

- United Auto Workers

==== Fundraising ====
Campaign finance reports as of October 14, 2026
Candidate	Raised	Spent	Cash on hand
Sydney Gruters (R)	$1,618,888	$1,366,391	$252,497
Kelly Kirschner (D)	$876,363	$615,224	$261,139
Source: Federal Election Commission

==== Polling ====
Poll source	Date(s) administered	Sample size	Margin of error	Sydney Gruters (R)	Kelly Kirschner (D)	Undecided
Public Policy Polling (D)	October 1–2, 2026	530 (RV)	± 4.3%	43%	39%	18%
Sea Polling (Note: Poll sponsored by Kelly Kirschner's campaign.)	August 25–29, 2026	400 (LV)	± 4.9%	39%	40%	21%

==== Results ====
2026 Florida's 16th congressional district election
Party	Candidate	Votes	%	±%
Republican	Sydney Gruters			
Democratic	Kelly Kirschner			
Independent	Mark Davis			
Total votes				

== District 17 ==
2026 Florida's 17th congressional district election
- Reporting: 99% as of Nov 9 at 5:53 PM EST
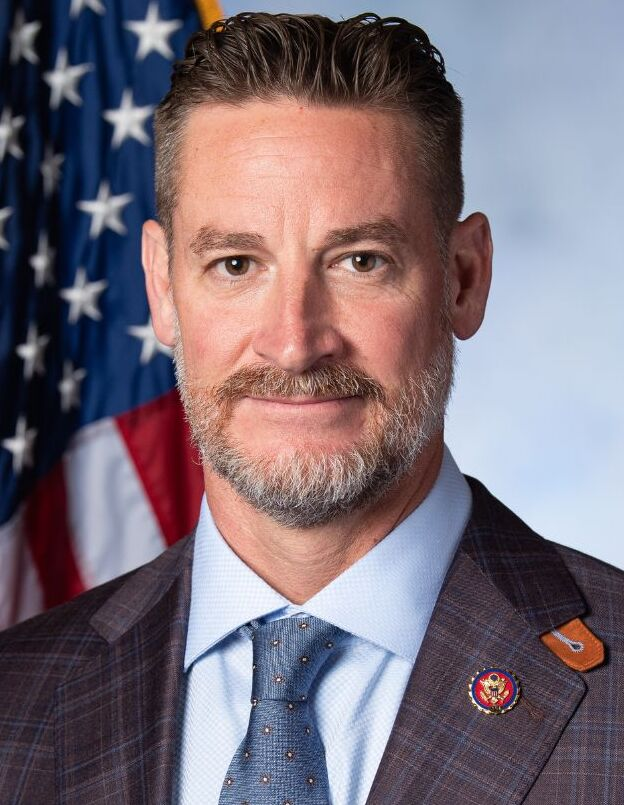

Nominee	Greg Steube	Matthew Montavon
Party	Republican	Democratic
Popular vote	209,186	143,675
Percentage	58.5%	40.1%
U.S. Representative before election
Greg Steube
Republican
Elected U.S. Representative
Greg Steube
Republican

Florida's 17th congressional district boundary from the 2026 elections Interactive map version

The incumbent is Republican Greg Steube, who was re-elected with 63.9% of the vote in 2024.

=== Republican primary ===
==== Nominee ====
- Greg Steube, incumbent U.S. representative

==== Declined ====
- Eddie Speir, former New College of Florida trustee and candidate for the 16th district in 2024 (ran in the 16th district)

==== Endorsements ====
Greg Steube

Executive branch officials

- Donald Trump, 45th and 47th president of the United States (2017–2021, 2025–present)

Labor unions

- Associated Builders and Contractors Florida Gulf Coast Chapter

Organizations

- AIPAC

==== Fundraising ====
Campaign finance reports as of June 30, 2026
Candidate	Raised	Spent	Cash on hand
Greg Steube (R)	$1,285,468	$710,552	$2,166,212
Source: Federal Election Commission

=== Democratic primary ===
==== Nominee ====
- Matthew Montavon, retired United Nations official and candidate for this district in 2024

==== Eliminated in primary ====
- Allen Spence, equities trader

==== Fundraising ====
Campaign finance reports as of June 30, 2026
Candidate	Raised	Spent	Cash on hand
Matthew Montavon (D)	$90,660 (Note: $38,453 was self funded)	$60,673	$29,947
Allen Spence (D)	$63,329 (Note: $35,090 was self funded)	$59,547	$3,882
Source: Federal Election Commission

==== Results ====
Democratic primary results
Party	Candidate	Votes	%
Democratic	Matthew Montavon	27,627	55.4
Democratic	Allen Spence	22,270	44.6
Total votes		49,897	100.0

=== Independents ===
==== Declared ====
- Michael Quirk, cybersecurity professional

=== General election ===
==== Predictions ====
Source	Ranking	As of
Decision Desk HQ	Likely R	November 3, 2026
The Cook Political Report	Solid R	February 6, 2025
Inside Elections	Solid R	May 5, 2026
Sabato's Crystal Ball	Safe R	April 10, 2025
The Economist	Safe R	May 6, 2026

==== Fundraising ====
Campaign finance reports as of October 14, 2026
Candidate	Raised	Spent	Cash on hand
Greg Steube (R)	$1,587,827	$1,047,067	$2,132,055
Matthew Montavon (D)	$156,274	$131,111	$25,123
Source: Federal Election Commission

==== Results ====
2026 Florida's 17th congressional district election
Party	Candidate	Votes	%	±%
Republican	Greg Steube (incumbent)			
Democratic	Matthew Montavon			
Independent	Michael Quirk			
Total votes				

== District 18 ==
2026 Florida's 18th congressional district election
- Reporting: 99% as of Nov 9 at 5:51 PM EST
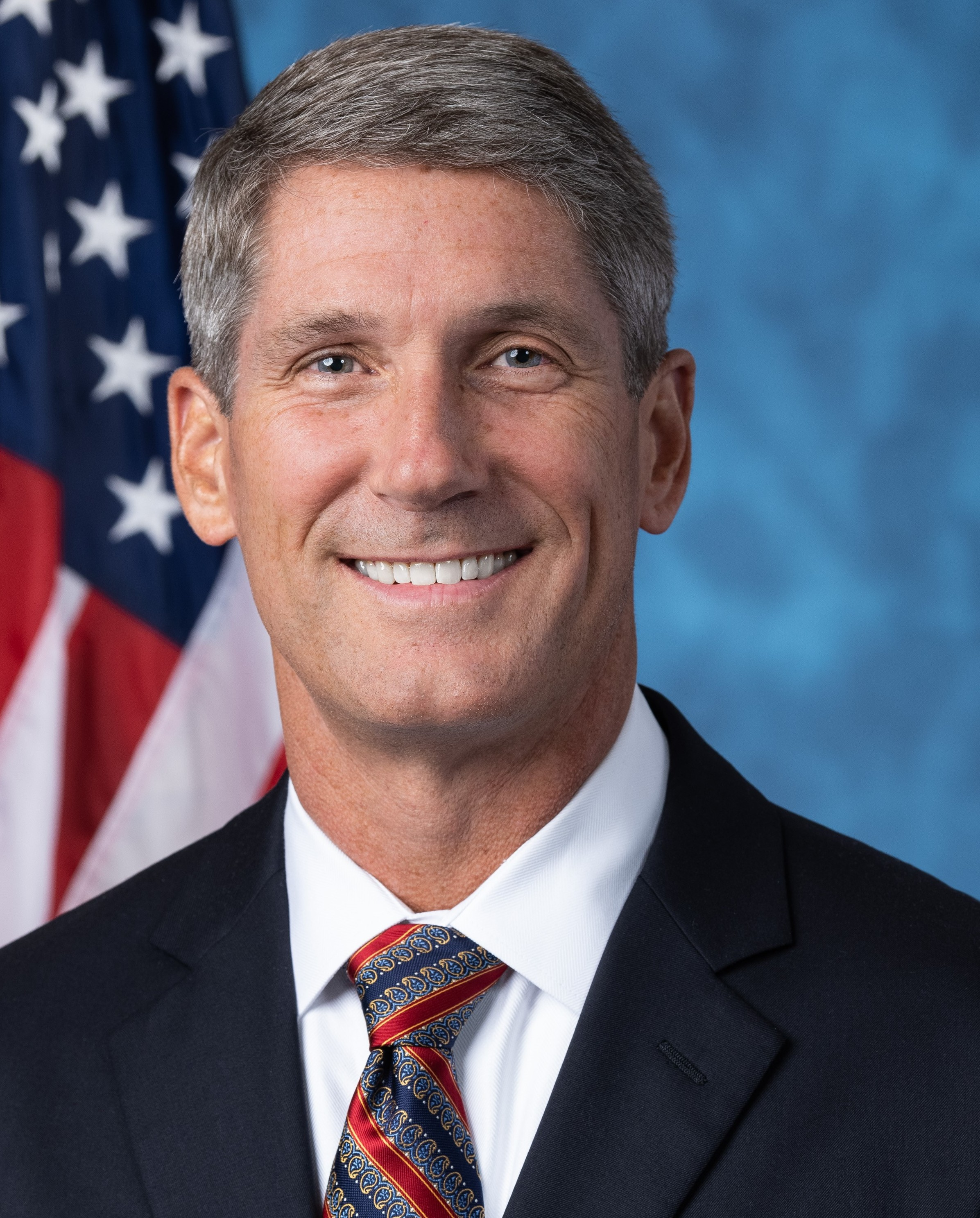

Nominee	Scott Franklin	Curtis Gibson
Party	Republican	Democratic
Popular vote	137,704	127,747
Percentage	50.3%	46.7%
U.S. Representative before election
Scott Franklin
Republican
Elected U.S. Representative
Scott Franklin
Republican

Florida's 18th congressional district boundary from the 2026 elections Interactive map version

The incumbent is Republican Scott Franklin, who was re-elected with 65.3% of the vote in 2024.

=== Republican primary ===
==== Nominee ====
- Scott Franklin, incumbent U.S. representative

==== Endorsements ====
Scott Franklin

Executive branch officials

- Donald Trump, 45th and 47th president of the United States (2017–2021, 2025–present)

Labor unions

- Associated Builders and Contractors Florida Gulf Coast Chapter

Organizations

- AIPAC

==== Fundraising ====
Campaign finance reports as of June 30, 2026
Candidate	Raised	Spent	Cash on hand
Scott Franklin (R)	$827,754	$363,945	$945,704
Source: Federal Election Commission

=== Democratic primary ===
==== Nominee ====
- Curtis Gibson, former Lake Wales city commissioner

==== Fundraising ====
Campaign finance reports as of March 31, 2026
Candidate	Raised	Spent	Cash on hand
Curtis Gibson (D)	$453 (Note: $148 was self funded)	$105	$348
Source: Federal Election Commission

=== Independents ===
==== Declared ====
- Deva Simmons, developmental therapist

=== General election ===
==== Predictions ====
Source	Ranking	As of
Decision Desk HQ	Likely R	July 14, 2026
The Cook Political Report	Solid R	February 6, 2025
Inside Elections	Solid R	May 5, 2026
Sabato's Crystal Ball	Safe R	April 10, 2025
The Economist	Likely R	May 6, 2026

==== Post-primary endorsements ====
Deva Simmons (I)

Political parties

- Forward Party

==== Fundraising ====
Campaign finance reports as of October 14, 2026
Candidate	Raised	Spent	Cash on hand
Scott Franklin (R)	$1,026,404	$625,069	$883,231
Curtis Gibson (D)	$13,785	$10,756	$1,577
Source: Federal Election Commission

==== Results ====
2026 Florida's 18th congressional district election
Party	Candidate	Votes	%	±%
Republican	Scott Franklin (incumbent)			
Democratic	Curtis Gibson			
Independent	Deva Simmons			
Total votes				

== District 19 ==
2026 Florida's 19th congressional district election
- Reporting: 99% as of Nov 9 at 5:51 PM EST
Nominee	Jim Schwartzel	Victor Arias
Party	Republican	Democratic
Popular vote	198,765	122,425
Percentage	61.1%	37.6%
U.S. Representative before election
Byron Donalds
Republican
Elected U.S. Representative
Jim Schwartzel
Republican

Florida's 19th congressional district boundary from the 2026 elections Interactive map version

The incumbent is Republican Byron Donalds, who was re-elected with 66.3% of the vote in 2024. Donalds is retiring to run for governor.

The Republican primary included six candidates who had previously run for Congress in other states, including two former representatives from other states, Madison Cawthorn (NC-11) and Chris Collins (NY-27). Catalina Lauf and Jim Oberweis had previously faced each other in the 2020 Republican primary in Illinois' 14th congressional district.

=== Republican primary ===
==== Nominee ====
- Jim Schwartzel, president of Sun Broadcasting, owner of WFSX-FM

==== Eliminated in primary ====
- Greg "Tex" Bukowski, Sarasota County Charter Review Board member and business owner
- Madison Cawthorn, former U.S. representative from North Carolina's 11th congressional district (2021–2023)
- Chris Collins, former U.S. representative from New York's 27th congressional district (2013–2019)
- Ola Hawatmeh, philanthropist, former senior policy advisor to U.S. representative Victoria Spartz and candidate for New York's 19th congressional district in 2020
- Catalina Lauf, former U.S. Department of Commerce advisor, candidate for Illinois's 14th congressional district in 2020, and nominee for Illinois's 11th congressional district in 2022
- Jim Oberweis, former Illinois state senator from the 25th district (2013–2021), chairman of Oberweis Dairy, and perennial candidate (Note: Candidate for Governor of Illinois in 2006, nominee for Illinois's 14th congressional district in 2020 and the 2008 special and regular elections, candidate for U.S. Senate in Illinois in 2002 and 2004, and nominee in 2014)
- Mike Pedersen, Marine Corps veteran and volunteer wrestling coach
- Linda Sawyer, former researcher at the National Institutes of Health, candidate for Michigan's 13th congressional district in 2020 and Michigan's 12th congressional district in 2024
- John Strand, former underwear model, spokesman for America's Frontline Doctors, and pardoned participant in the January 6 United States Capitol attack

==== Withdrawn ====
- Stephen Elliott, Marine Corps veteran
- Johnny Fratto, HVAC installer and candidate for the 26th district in 2024 (endorsed Cawthorn)
- Dylan Modarelli, jeweler

==== Declined ====
- Yvette Benarroch, state representative from the 81st district (2024–present)
- Adam Botana, state representative from the 80th district (2020–present)
- Matt Caldwell, Lee County property appraiser (2020–present) and nominee for Florida commissioner of agriculture in 2018
- Byron Donalds, incumbent U.S. representative (running for governor)
- Dane Eagle, former secretary of the Florida Department of Economic Opportunity (2020–2022), former state representative from the 77th district (2012–2020), and candidate for this district in 2020
- Carmine Marceno, Lee County sheriff
- Kathleen Passidomo, state senator from the 28th district (2016–present) and former president of the Florida Senate (2022–2024)
- Bob Rommel, former state representative from the 81st district (2016–2024)

==== Endorsements ====
Madison Cawthorn

Executive branch officials

- Markwayne Mullin, secretary of homeland security (2026–present)

Individuals

- Johnny Fratto, HVAC installer and former candidate for this seat

Organizations

- Republicans for National Renewal
Ola Hawatmeh

U.S. representatives

- John McGuire, VA-05 (2025–present)
- Marlin Stutzman, IN-03 (2010–2017, 2025–present)

State legislators

- Meg Weinberger, state representative from the 94th district (2024–present)

Individuals

- Dan Newlin, businessman, former Orange County sheriff's deputy and nominee for U.S. ambassador to Columbia
Catalina Lauf

Executive branch officials

- Donald Trump, president of the United States (2017–2021, 2025–present)

U.S. senators

- Jim Banks, U.S. senator from Indiana (2025–present)

U.S. representatives

- Kat Cammack, FL-03 (2021–present)
- David McIntosh, former IN-2 (1995–2001)
- Burgess Owens, UT-04 (2021–present)
- Anna Paulina Luna, FL-13 (2023–present)
- Greg Steube, FL-17 (2019–present)

Labor unions

- Associated Builders and Contractors Florida Gulf Coast Chapter

Organizations

- Club for Growth PAC
- Freedom Caucus Fund
- Turning Point Action (dual endorsement with Strand)
Mike Pedersen

State legislators

- Quang Nguyen, Arizona state representative from the 1st district (2021–present)

Individuals

- James L. Dozier, retired United States Army officer
Jim Schwartzel

U.S. senators

- Connie Mack III, former United States senator from Florida (1989–2001)

U.S. representatives

- Jim Jordan, OH-04 (2007–present)
- Connie Mack IV, former FL-14 (2005–2013)
- Steve Scalise, majority leader of the House of Representatives (2023–present) from LA-01 (2008–present)
John Strand

Executive branch officials

- Michael Flynn, former National Security advisor (2017), former director of the Defense Intelligence Agency (2012–2014)

U.S. representatives

- Lauren Boebert, CO-04 (2021–present)
- Bob McEwen, former OH-06 (1981–1993)

Individuals

- Simone Gold, founder of America's Frontline Doctors
- Eric Metaxas, Christian author and conservative radio host
- Alfie Oakes, founder and CEO of Oakes Farms
- Dennis Prager, host of the Dennis Prager Show and co-founder of PragerU
- Lorenzo Sewell, pastor

Organizations

- Turning Point Action (dual endorsement with Lauf)

==== Polling ====
Poll source	Date(s) administered	Sample size	Margin of error	Madison Cawthorn	Chris Collins	Ola Hawatmeh	Catalina Lauf	Jim Oberweis	Mike Pedersen	Jim Schwartzel	John Strand	Other	Undecided
Victory Insights (R)	August 4–6, 2026	1,200 (LV)	–	6%	8%	4%	19%	12%	–	19%	3%	5% (Note: "Others" with 5%)	25%
Action Solutions (Note: Poll sponsored by Hawatmeh's campaign)	July 7–19, 2026	96 (RV)	–	3%	12%	13%	4%	5%	–	10%	–	–	54%
Victory Insights (R)	June 20–21, 2026	350 (LV)	–	5%	3%	–	5%	12%	4%	13%	4%	1% (Note: "Someone else" with 1%)	54%
Inquire (Note: Poll sponsored by Carmine Marceno)	October 4–6, 2025	302 (LV)	± 5.7%	8%	9%	–	1%	8%	2%	5%	–	0% (Note: Fratto, and Modarelli with 0%)	67%

Hypothetical polling

Poll source	Date(s) administered	Sample size	Margin of error	Madison Cawthorn	Chris Collins	Carmine Marceno	Jim Oberweis	Jim Schwartzel	Other	Undecided
Inquire	October 4–6, 2025	302 (LV)	± 5.7%	4%	5%	36%	7%	4%	1% (Note: Lauf with 1%; Fratto, Hawatmeh, Modarelli, and Pedersen with 0%)	44%

==== Fundraising ====
Campaign finance reports as of July 29, 2026
Candidate	Raised	Spent	Cash on hand
Greg Bukowski (R)	$21,338 (Note: $15,020 was self funded)	$18,763	$2,575
Madison Cawthorn (R)	$874,630 (Note: $800,000 was self funded)	$728,436	$146,194
Chris Collins (R)	$3,410,000 (Note: $2,610,000 was self funded)	$2,462,420	$947,580
Ola Hawatmeh (R)	$391,537 (Note: $124,000 was self funded)	$291,862	$99,676
Catalina Lauf (R)	$1,674,013	$1,571,183	$102,830
Jim Oberweis (R)	$5,326,140 (Note: $4,902,096 was self funded)	$3,081,609	$2,244,531
Mike Pedersen (R)	$74,708	$62,324	$12,384
Linda Sawyer (R)	$10,550 (Note: $10,550 was self funded)	$10,498	$52
Jim Schwartzel (R)	$2,065,485 (Note: $1,000,000 was self funded)	$1,883,586	$181,899
John Strand (R)	$135,297	$131,845	$3,452
Source: Federal Election Commission

==== Debates ====
2026 Florida's 19th congressional district Republican primary debates
No.	Date	Host	Moderator(s)	Link	Republican	Republican	Republican	Republican	Republican	Republican	Republican	Republican	Republican	Republican
Key: P Participant A Absent N Not invited I Invited W Withdrawn														
Key: P Participant A Absent N Not invited I Invited W Withdrawn					Greg Bukowski	Madison Cawthorn	Chris Collins	Ola Hawatmeh	Catalina Lauf	Jim Oberweis	Mike Pedersen	Linda Sawyer	Jim Schwartzel	John Strand
1	June 23, 2026	FLC Action; Action for Life	Ryan Kennedy; Fr. Michael Orsi	YouTube	P	P	A	P	A	P	P	N	A	P
2	June 27, 2026	Republican Party of Florida	Kimberly Leonard; Marc Caputo; Peter Schorsch	YouTube (Note: Starts around 4:00:52)	N	P	A	P	P	A	N	N	A	N
3	July 7, 2026	Republican Party of Lee County	Amanda Cochran; Grant Fichter	YouTube	A	P	A	P	P	P	P	A	A	P
4	July 18, 2026	Republican Party of Lee County		YouTube	N	P	N	P	P	A	P	P	N	A

==== Results ====
Republican primary results
Party	Candidate	Votes	%
Republican	Jim Schwartzel	26,153	29.1
Republican	Catalina Lauf	19,722	22.0
Republican	Jim Oberweis	14,110	15.7
Republican	Madison Cawthorn	7,596	8.5
Republican	Chris Collins	6,617	7.4
Republican	Mike Pedersen	5,581	6.2
Republican	John Strand	3,513	3.9
Republican	Ola Hawatmeh	2,534	2.8
Republican	Greg "Tex" Bukowski	2,266	2.5
Republican	Linda Sawyer	1,650	1.8
Total votes		89,742	100.0

=== Democratic primary ===
==== Nominee ====
- Victor Arias, attorney

==== Eliminated in primary ====
- Robert Neeld, nominee for this district in 2016
- Howard Sapp, retired air traffic controller and nominee for Florida's 78th House of Representatives district in 2024

==== Fundraising ====
Campaign finance reports as of June 30, 2026
Candidate	Raised	Spent	Cash on hand
Victor Arias (D)	$25,798 (Note: $20,500 was self funded)	$13,835	$11,963
Robert Neeld (D)	$15,000 (Note: $15,000 was self funded)	$10,688	$4,312
Howard Sapp (D)	$52,432 (Note: $15,700 was self funded)	$53,115	$0
Source: Federal Election Commission

==== Results ====
Democratic primary results
Party	Candidate	Votes	%
Democratic	Victor Arias	15,410	45.5
Democratic	Howard Sapp	13,918	41.1
Democratic	Robert Neeld	4,553	13.4
Total votes		33,881	100.0

=== Independents ===
==== Declared ====
- Seth Haskins, business manager

==== Write-in ====
- Alexandra Zakhvatayev, journalist

=== General election ===
==== Predictions ====
Source	Ranking	As of
Decision Desk HQ	Safe R	July 14, 2026
The Cook Political Report	Solid R	February 6, 2025
Inside Elections	Solid R	May 5, 2026
Sabato's Crystal Ball	Safe R	April 10, 2025
The Economist	Safe R	May 6, 2026

==== Post-primary endorsements ====
Jim Schwartzel (R)

Executive branch officials

- Donald Trump, 45th and 47th president of the United States (2017–2021, 2025–present)

Statewide officials

- Ron DeSantis, governor of Florida (2019–present)

==== Fundraising ====
Campaign finance reports as of October 14, 2026
Candidate	Raised	Spent	Cash on hand
Jim Schwartzel (R)	$2,828,903	$2,322,691	$506,211
Victor Arias (D)	$69,983	$54,566	$15,417
Source: Federal Election Commission

==== Results ====
2026 Florida's 19th congressional district election
Party	Candidate	Votes	%	±%
Republican	Jim Schwartzel			
Democratic	Victor Arias			
Independent	Seth Haskins			
Total votes				

== District 20 ==
2026 Florida's 20th congressional district election
- Reporting: 99% as of Nov 9 at 5:36 PM EST
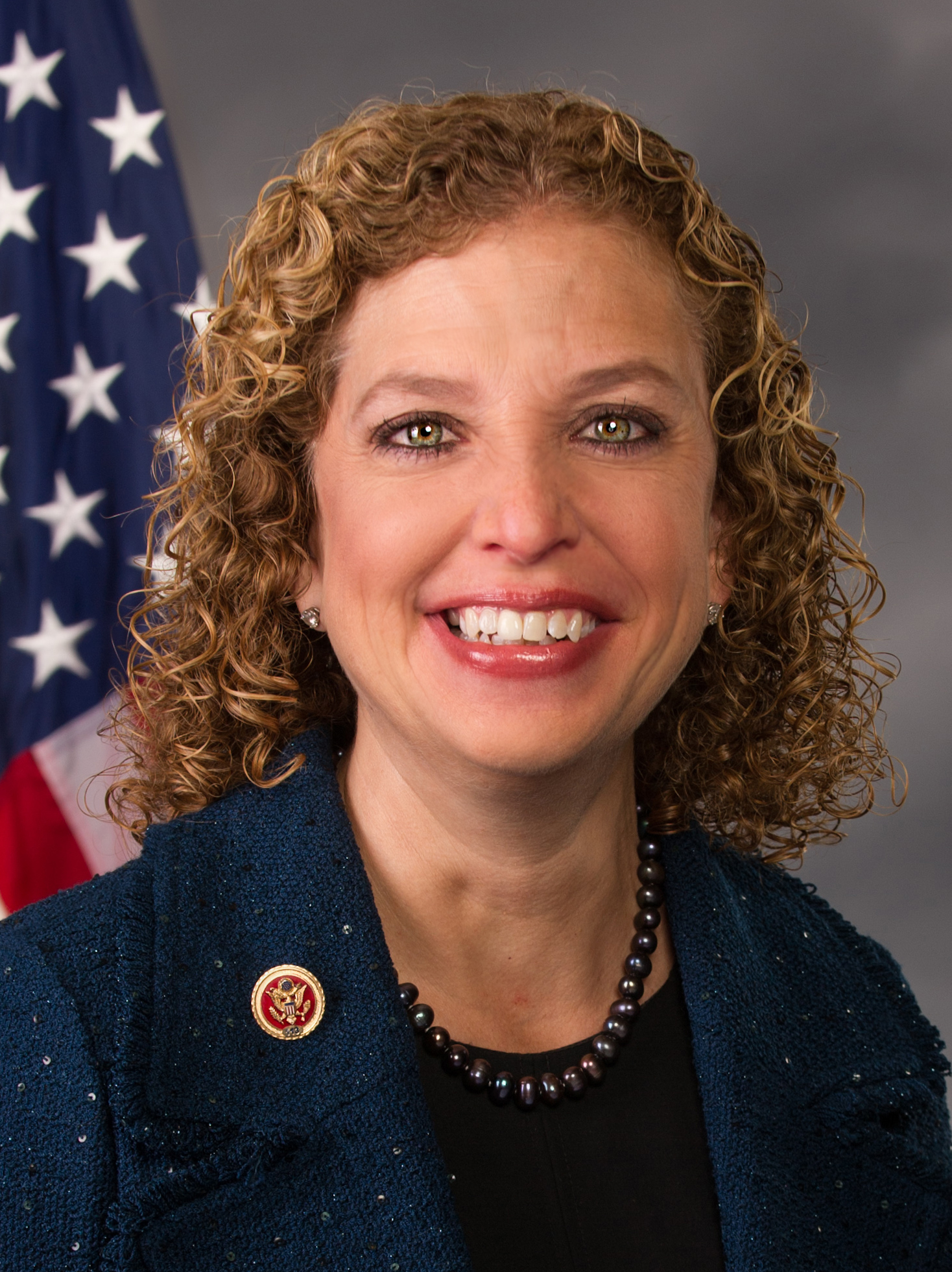

Nominee	Debbie Wasserman Schultz	Brent Andersen
Party	Democratic	Republican
Popular vote	182,712	53,396
Percentage	74.4%	21.7%
U.S. Representative before election
Sheila Cherfilus-McCormick
Democratic
Elected U.S. Representative
Debbie Wasserman Schultz
Democratic

Florida's 20th congressional district boundary from the 2026 elections Interactive map version

This seat is vacant following the resignation of Democrat Sheila Cherfilus-McCormick on April 21, 2026, who was re-elected in an uncontested race in 2024.

=== Democratic primary ===
==== Nominee ====
- Debbie Wasserman Schultz, incumbent U.S. representative from the 25th district (previously ran in the 25th district)

==== Eliminated in primary ====
- Luther Campbell, rapper and candidate for mayor of Miami-Dade County in 2011
- Sheila Cherfilus-McCormick, former U.S. representative (2022–2026)
- Dale Holness, former mayor of Broward County and candidate for this district in the 2022 special and regular elections
- Elijah Manley, substitute teacher and activist

==== Withdrawn ====
- Susan Clubb
- Rudy Moise, doctor and candidate for the 24th district in 2010 (Note: This district was numbered as the 17th district prior to the 2010 redistricting cycle.) and 2012 (endorsed Campbell and Holness; ran in the 24th district)
- Maisha Williams, daughter of former U.S. Representative Alcee Hastings (1993–2021) (endorsed Wasserman Schultz)

==== Declined ====
- Oliver Larkin, digital strategist and union organizer (running in the 25th district)
- Jared Moskowitz, incumbent U.S. representative from the 23rd district (running in the 25th district)

==== Endorsements ====
Luther Campbell

Individuals

- Benjamin Crump, civil rights lawyer
- Rudy Moise, doctor and former candidate for this seat (co-endorsement with Holness)
Sheila Cherfilus-McCormick

Individuals

- Buju Banton, reggae musician
Dale Holness

Local officials

- Johnny Ford, former mayor of Tuskegee, Alabama (1972–1996, 2004–2008, 2012–2016)

Individuals

- Rudy Moise, doctor and former candidate for this seat (co-endorsement with Campbell)

Organizations

- Emgage Action
Elijah Manley

U.S. representatives

- Ro Khanna, CA-17 (2017–present)

Individuals

- Armando Grundy-Gomes, president of Democratic Black Caucus of Florida
- Ms. Rachel, YouTuber and children's educator
- Stephanie Taylor, author and co-founder of Progressive Change Campaign Committee

Organizations

- College Democrats of America
- Democratic Progressive Caucus of Florida
- Dream Defenders
- Equality PAC (co-endorsement with Wasserman Schultz)
- Florida Young Democrats
- Friends of the Earth Action
- Gen-Z for Change
- Our Revolution
- Peace Action
- Progressive Change Campaign Committee
- Progressive Victory
- SAVE Dade (co-endorsement with Wasserman Schultz)
- Third Act GrayPAC
- Track AIPAC

Newspapers

- The Miami Times
Debbie Wasserman Schultz

Local officials

- Jack Seiler, former mayor of Fort Lauderdale (2009–2018)
- Dean Trantalis, mayor of Fort Lauderdale (2018–present)

Labor unions

- Broward Teachers Union (AFT Local 1975)
- Florida AFL-CIO

Organizations

- AIPAC
- Democratic Majority for Israel
- Equality PAC (co-endorsement with Manley)
- Giffords
- Jewish Democratic Council of America
- Joint Action Committee for Political Affairs
- League of Conservation Voters
- Planned Parenthood Action Fund
- Population Connection
- SAVE Dade (co-endorsement with Manley)

Newspapers

- Miami Herald
- Sun Sentinel
Declined to endorse

U.S. representatives

- Hakeem Jeffries, House minority leader (2023–present) from NY-08 (2013–present)

Organizations

- Florida LGBTQ Democratic Caucus

==== Fundraising ====
Campaign finance reports as of July 29, 2026
Candidate	Raised	Spent	Cash on hand
Luther Campbell (D)	$163,622	$101,076	$62,545
Sheila Cherfilus-McCormick (D)	$389,258	$386,958	$0
Dale Holness (D)	$394,893	$144,766	$269,210
Elijah Manley (D)	$1,068,384	$1,034,786	$33,598
Debbie Wasserman Schultz (D)	$3,300,107	$2,496,043	$1,861,373
Source: Federal Election Commission

==== Polling ====
Poll source	Date(s) administered	Sample size	Margin of error	Luther Campbell	Sheila Cherfilus-McCormick	Dale Holness	Elijah Manley	Debbie Wasserman Schultz	Other	Undecided
Listener Group/ Political Matrix News (R)	May 29 – June 1, 2026	500 (LV)	± 4.4%	2%	3%	15%	21%	39%	1% (Note: Maisha Williams with 1%)	19%
Listener Group/ Political Matrix News (R)	May 29 – June 1, 2026	500 (LV)	± 4.4%	–	–	–	63%	37%	–	–
Listener Group/ Political Matrix News (R)	May 29 – June 1, 2026	500 (LV)	± 4.4%	–	–	61%	–	39%	–	–
Listener Group/ Political Matrix News (R)	May 29 – June 1, 2026	500 (LV)	± 4.4%	–	45%	–	–	55%	–	–
Listener Group/ Political Matrix News (R)	May 29 – June 1, 2026	500 (LV)	± 4.4%	62%	–	–	–	38%	–	–
	May 22, 2026	Wasserman Schultz enters race								
	April 24, 2026	McCormick re-declares								
	April 21, 2026	McCormick resigns from the US House								
Listener Group/ Political Matrix News (R)	February 24–28, 2026	400 (LV)	± 3.5%	1%	31%	13%	35%	–	1% (Note: Rudy Moise with 1%)	19%
Listener Group/ Political Matrix News (R)	February 24–28, 2026	400 (LV)	± 3.5%	2%	–	34%	47%	–	1%	16%
Listener Group/ Political Matrix News (R)	February 2–4, 2026	300 (LV)	± 3.0%	–	35%	10%	38%	–	13%	
Listener Group/ Political Matrix News (R)	February 2–4, 2026	300 (LV)	± 3.0%	–	38%	–	40%	–	–	22%
Listener Group/ Political Matrix News (R)	February 2–4, 2026	300 (LV)	± 3.0%	–	–	33%	45%	–	–	22%

==== Results ====
Democratic primary results
Party	Candidate	Votes	%
Democratic	Debbie Wasserman Schultz (incumbent)	30,505	45.3
Democratic	Dale Holness	15,571	23.1
Democratic	Elijah Manley	9,377	13.9
Democratic	Sheila Cherfilus-McCormick	6,193	9.2
Democratic	Luther Campbell	5,691	8.5
Total votes		67,337	100.0

=== Republican primary ===
==== Nominee ====
- Brent Andersen, businessman

==== Eliminated in primary ====
- Lateresa Jones, organizer
- Rod Joseph, consultant and Democratic candidate for U.S. Senate in 2024
- Carla Spalding, perennial candidate

==== Endorsements ====
Rod Joseph

U.S. senators

- Rick Scott, Florida (2019–present)

State legislators

- Al Jacquet, former state representative from the 88th district (2016–2020) (Democrat)
- Rachel Plakon, state representative from the 36th district (2022–present)
Brent Andersen

State legislators

- Chip LaMarca, state representative from the 100th district (2018–present)

Organizations

- Log Cabin Republicans

Newspapers

- Sun Sentinel

==== Fundraising ====
Campaign finance reports as of June 30, 2026
Candidate	Raised	Spent	Cash on hand
Brent Andersen (R)	$62,126	$15,573	$46,553
Lateresa Jones (R)	$11,002 (Note: $10,400 was self funded)	$10,898	$130
Rod Joseph (R)	$88,417	$76,289	$12,127
Carla Spalding (R)	$7,534	$14,929	$19,604
Source: Federal Election Commission

==== Results ====
Republican primary results
Party	Candidate	Votes	%
Republican	Brent Andersen	7,442	53.8
Republican	Rod Joseph	2,831	20.5
Republican	Carla Spalding	2,701	19.5
Republican	Lateresa Jones	866	6.3
Total votes		13,840	100.0

=== Independent Party of Florida primary ===
==== Nominee ====
- Kedner Maxime

==== Withdrawn ====
- Clifford Fleetwood

=== General election ===
==== Predictions ====
Source	Ranking	As of
Decision Desk HQ	Safe D	July 14, 2026
The Cook Political Report	Solid D	February 6, 2025
Inside Elections	Solid D	May 5, 2026
Sabato's Crystal Ball	Safe D	April 10, 2025
The Economist	Safe D	May 6, 2026

==== Post-primary endorsements ====
Debbie Wasserman Schultz (D)

Labor unions

- National Education Association
- United Auto Workers

==== Fundraising ====
Campaign finance reports as of October 14, 2026
Candidate	Raised	Spent	Cash on hand
Debbie Wasserman Schultz (D)	$3,707,925	$3,980,664	$784,570
Brent Andersen (R)	$100,350	$83,795	$16,555
Source: Federal Election Commission

==== Results ====
2026 Florida's 20th congressional district election
Party	Candidate	Votes	%	±%
Democratic	Debbie Wasserman Schultz (incumbent)			
Republican	Brent Andersen			
Independent Party	Kedner Maxime			
Total votes				

== District 21 ==
2026 Florida's 21st congressional district election
- Reporting: 99% as of Nov 9 at 5:46 PM EST
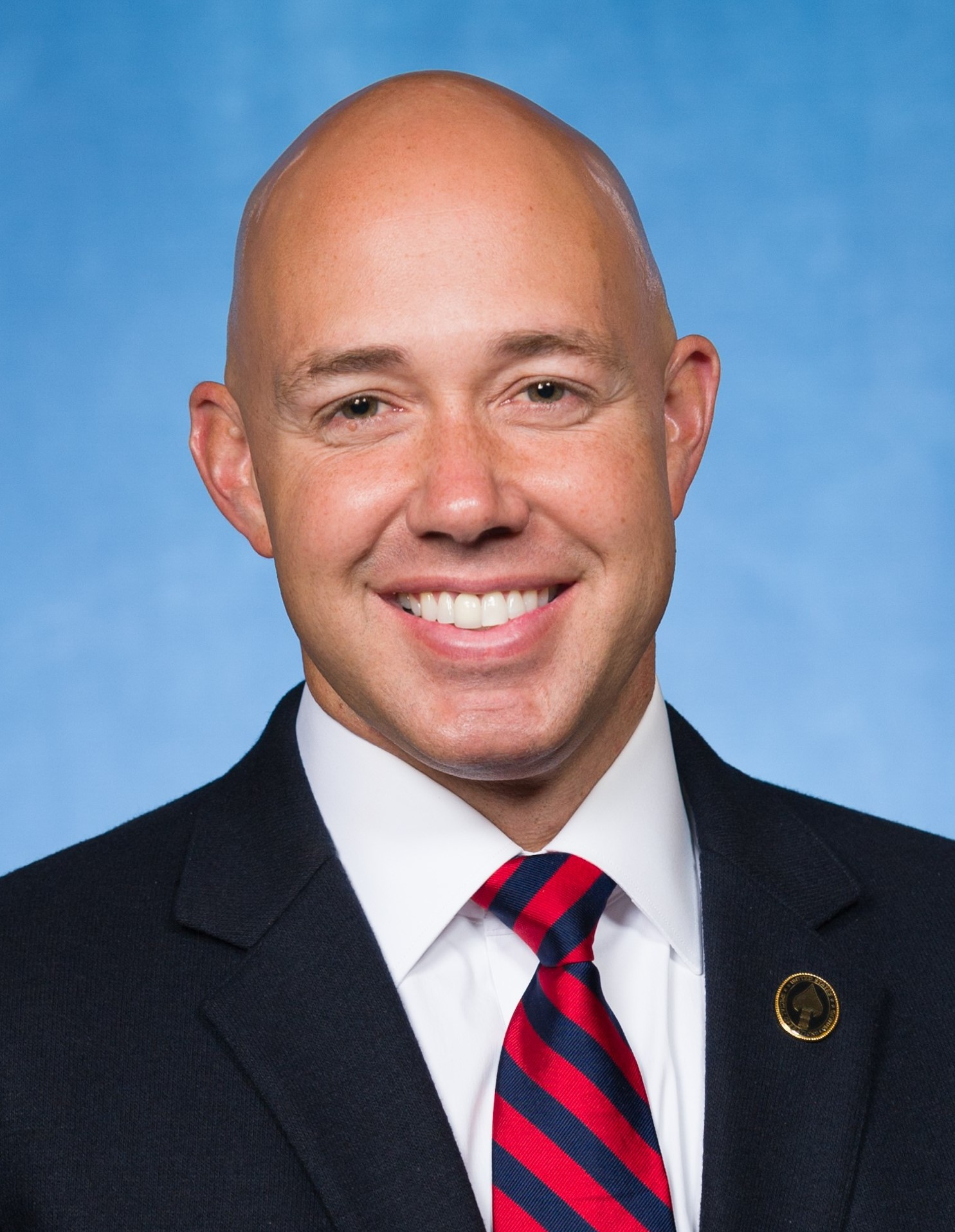

Nominee	Brian Mast	James Martin
Party	Republican	Democratic
Popular vote	184,324	153,242
Percentage	53.9%	44.8%
U.S. Representative before election
Brian Mast
Republican
Elected U.S. Representative
Brian Mast
Republican

Florida's 21st congressional district boundary from the 2026 elections Interactive map version

The incumbent is Republican Brian Mast, who was re-elected with 61.8% of the vote in 2024.

=== Republican primary ===
==== Nominee ====
- Brian Mast, incumbent U.S. representative

==== Endorsements ====
Brian Mast

Executive branch officials

- Donald Trump, president of the United States (2017–2021, 2025–present)

Organizations

- AIPAC

==== Fundraising ====
Campaign finance reports as of June 30, 2026
Candidate	Raised	Spent	Cash on hand
Brian Mast (R)	$4,308,890	$3,151,810	$2,928,458
Source: Federal Election Commission

=== Democratic primary ===
==== Nominee ====
- James Martin, lieutenant commander in the U.S. Coast Guard Reserve

==== Eliminated in primary ====
- Bernard Taylor, firefighter

==== Withdrawn ====
- Pia Dandiya, manager of the Apple Strategic Innovations Group (running in the 22nd district)
- Elizabeth Pandich, horse competition trainer

==== Endorsements ====
James Martin

Executive branch officials

- Kamala Harris, former vice president of the United States (2021–2025)

State legislators

- Debra Tendrich, HD-89 (2024–present)

Local officials

- Anne Gannon, Palm Beach County tax collector (2006–present)
Bernard Taylor

Individuals

- Flo Rida, singer and rapper

Organizations

- Anti-Zionist America PAC
- Democratic Progressive Caucus of Florida
- Emgage Action
- Track AIPAC

==== Fundraising ====
Italics indicate a withdrawn candidate.

Campaign finance reports as of July 29, 2026
Candidate	Raised	Spent	Cash on hand
James Martin (D)	$579,319 (Note: $150,001 was self funded)	$391,274	$188,041
Elizabeth Pandich (D)	$71,436	$71,436	$0
Bernard Taylor (D)	$993,380	$856,522	$151,968
Source: Federal Election Commission

==== Results ====
Democratic primary results
Party	Candidate	Votes	%
Democratic	James Martin	24,054	50.4
Democratic	Bernard Taylor	23,692	49.6
Total votes		47,746	100.0

=== Third party and independents ===
==== Declared ====
- Alexander Cooke (Independent), former mayor and councilmember of Juno Beach & financial executive
- David Fabrikant (Independent) (write-in)

==== Failed to qualify ====
- Amr Metwally (MGTOW Party), anti-feminist activist and perennial candidate

=== General election ===
==== Predictions ====
Source	Ranking	As of
Decision Desk HQ	Likely R	July 14, 2026
The Cook Political Report	Solid R	February 6, 2025
Inside Elections	Solid R	May 5, 2026
Sabato's Crystal Ball	Safe R	April 10, 2025
The Economist	Likely R	May 6, 2026

==== Post-primary endorsements ====
Alexander Cooke (I)

Political parties

- Forward Party

==== Fundraising ====
Campaign finance reports as of October 14, 2026
Candidate	Raised	Spent	Cash on hand
Brian Mast (R)	$5,097,732	$4,490,347	$2,378,763
James Martin (D)	$821,779	$770,880	$50,898
Source: Federal Election Commission

==== Polling ====
Poll source	Date(s) administered	Sample size	Margin of error	Brian Mast (R)	James Martin (D)	Other	Undecided
Upswing Research & Strategy (D) (Note: Poll sponsored by Martin's campaign)	September 21–25, 2026	402 (LV)	± 4.9%	49%	38%	–	13%

==== Results ====
2026 Florida's 21st congressional district election
Party	Candidate	Votes	%	±%
Republican	Brian Mast (incumbent)			
Democratic	James Martin			
Independent	Alexander Cooke			
Total votes				

== District 22 ==
2026 Florida's 22nd congressional district election
- Reporting: 99% as of Nov 9 at 5:51 PM EST
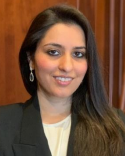

Nominee	Pia Dandiya	Casey Askar
Party	Democratic	Republican
Popular vote	153,177	141,939
Percentage	51.9%	48.1%
U.S. Representative before election
Lois Frankel
Democratic
Elected U.S. Representative
Pia Dandiya
Democratic

Florida's 22nd congressional district boundary from the 2026 elections Interactive map version

The incumbent, Democrat Lois Frankel, who was re-elected with 55.0% of the vote in 2024, was redistricted to the redrawn 23rd district.

=== Democratic primary ===
==== Nominee ====
- Pia Dandiya, manager of the Apple Strategic Innovations Group (previously ran in the 21st district)

==== Eliminated in primary ====
- Kaysia Earley, attorney

==== Withdrawn ====
- Victoria Doyle, attorney (running in the 23rd district)
- Lois Frankel, incumbent U.S. representative (running in the 23rd district)

==== Declined ====
- Lauren Book, former minority leader of the Florida Senate (2021–2024) from the 35th district (2016–2024) (running for state senate)
- Jared Moskowitz, incumbent U.S. representative from the 23rd district (running in the 25th district)
- Debbie Wasserman Schultz, incumbent U.S. representative from the 25th district (running in the 20th district)

==== Endorsements ====
Pia Dandiya

Executive branch officials

- Arne Duncan, former secretary of education (2009–2016)

U.S. representatives

- Suzan DelBene, WA-01 (2012–present)
- Ro Khanna, CA-17 (2017–present)
- Annie Kuster, former NH-02 (2013–2025)
- Patrick Murphy, former FL-18 (2013–2017)
- Jill Tokuda, HI-02 (2023–present)

Statewide officials

- Dave Aronberg, former state attorney for the Fifteenth Judicial Circuit Court of Florida (2013–2025)

State legislators

- Lori Berman, minority leader of the Florida Senate (2025–present) from the 31st district (2018–present)
- Emily Gregory, state representative from the 87th district (2026–present)
- Tina Polsky, state senator from the 30th district (2020–present)
- Jeremy Ring, former state senator from the 29th district (2006–2016)
- Kelly Skidmore, state representative from the 92nd district (2006–2010, 2020–present)
- Debra Tendrich, state representative from the 89th district (2024–present)

Local officials

- Steven Geller, former mayor of Broward County (2020–2021)
- Nan Rich, former mayor of Broward County (2023–2024)

Party officials

- Nikki Fried, chair of the Florida Democratic Party (2023–present)

Labor unions

- AFGE
- Florida AFL-CIO

Organizations

- AAPI Victory Fund
- ASPIRE PAC
- DCCC Red to Blue
- Democrats for Education Reform
- Dolphin Democrats
- Elect Democratic Women
- EMILYs List
- Vote Mama

Newspapers

- Sun Sentinel

==== Fundraising ====
Campaign finance reports as of June 30, 2026
Candidate	Raised	Spent	Cash on hand
Kaysia Earley (D)	$15,657 (Note: $11,200 was self funded)	$12,506	$3,151
Pia Dandiya (D)	$2,095,603	$730,219	$1,365,384
Source: Federal Election Commission

==== Results ====
Democratic primary results
Party	Candidate	Votes	%
Democratic	Pia Dandiya	26,067	68.6
Democratic	Kaysia Earley	11,947	31.4
Total votes		38,014	100.0

=== Republican primary ===
==== Nominee ====
- Casey Askar, businessman and candidate for the 19th district in 2020

==== Eliminated in primary ====
- David Burck, United States Marine Corps veteran and former law enforcement officer
- Michael Carbonara, businessman (previously ran in the 25th district)
- Richard Evans, accountant
- Terri Hasdorff, businesswoman and candidate for Alabama's 2nd congressional district in 2020
- Belinda Keiser, vice chancellor of Keiser University, Democratic candidate for Florida's 90th House of Representatives district in 2000, and candidate for Florida's 25th Senate district in 2018
- Michael Thompson, former Lee County Republican executive committee chair

==== Withdrawn ====
- Deborah Adeimy, financial advisor and candidate for this district in 2022 and 2024 (running in the 23rd district)
- Sara Baxter, Palm Beach County commissioner and mayor
- Dan Franzese, businessman and nominee for this district in 2022 and 2024 (running in the 25th district)
- Herbie Wertheim, billionaire businessman and philanthropist

==== Endorsements ====
Casey Askar

Executive branch officials

- Michael Flynn, former National Security advisor (2017), former director of the Defense Intelligence Agency (2012–2014)

U.S. representatives

- Gus Bilirakis, FL-12 (2007–present)

State legislators

- Kathleen Passidomo, former president of the Florida Senate (2022–2024) from the 28th district (2016–present)

Local officials

- Darrin Palumbo, Marco Island City council chair
- Kevin Rambosk, Collier County sheriff

Organizations

- CPAC
Michael Carbonara

U.S. representatives

- Jim Jordan, OH-04 (2007–present)
- David McIntosh, former IN-2 (1995–2001)

Individuals

- Alfie Oakes, founder and CEO of Oakes Farms

Organizations

- Club for Growth PAC
- Veterans for America First
Belinda Keiser

U.S. representatives

- Aaron Bean, FL-04 (2023–present)
- Mike Bost, IL-12 (2015–present)
- Vern Buchanan, FL-16 (2007–present)
- Neal Dunn, FL-02 (2017–present)
- Randy Fine, FL-06 (2025–present)
- Jimmy Patronis, FL-01 (2025–present)

Local officials

- Rene Champagne, Marco Island City Council vice chair

Labor unions

- Palm Beach Police Benevolent Association

Newspapers

- Sun Sentinel

==== Fundraising ====
Italics indicate a withdrawn candidate.

Campaign finance reports as of July 29, 2026
Candidate	Raised	Spent	Cash on hand
Casey Askar (R)	$2,567,760 (Note: $2,500,000 was self funded)	$1,519,364	$1,048,396
Deborah Adeimy (R)	$138,416	$84,497	$57,527
David Burck (R)	$253,073	$185,965	$67,108
Michael Carbonara (R)	$6,332,573 (Note: $3,772,598 was self funded)	$6,295,983	$36,589
Terri Hasdorff (R)	$46,150 (Note: $15,000 was self funded)	$18,283	$27,867
Belinda Keiser (R)	$3,797,856 (Note: $3,016,318 was self funded)	$3,096,262	$701,594
Anna Medvedeva (R)	$278,318 (Note: $250,000 was self funded)	$278,318	$0
Michael Thompson (R)	$23,613	$20,646	$2,967
Herbert Wertheim (R)	$2,500,000 (Note: $2,500,000 was self funded)	$2,500,000	$0
Source: Federal Election Commission

==== Debates ====
2026 Florida's 22nd congressional district Republican primary debates
No.	Date	Host	Moderator(s)	Link	Republican	Republican	Republican	Republican	Republican	Republican	Republican
Key: P Participant A Absent N Not invited I Invited W Withdrawn											
Key: P Participant A Absent N Not invited I Invited W Withdrawn					Casey Askar	David Burck	Michael Carbonara	Richard Evans	Terri Hasdorff	Belinda Keiser	Michael Thompson
1	June 20, 2026	Collier County; Republican executive committee		YouTube	P	P	P	P	P	P	P
2	August 1, 2026	Southwest Florida Young Republicans		YouTube	A	P	P	P	P	A	A

==== Polling ====
Poll source	Date(s) administered	Sample size	Margin of error	Casey Askar	David Burck	Michael Carbonara	Terri Hasdorff	Belinda Keiser	Other	Undecided
Victory Insights	August 4–6, 2026	1,200 (LV)	–	13%	9%	11%	6%	14%	6% (Note: Richard Evans and Michael Thompson with 3%)	42%

==== Results ====
Republican primary results
Party	Candidate	Votes	%
Republican	Casey Askar	14,774	30.9
Republican	Michael Carbonara	9,072	18.9
Republican	Belinda Keiser	8,785	18.3
Republican	David Burck	7,505	15.7
Republican	Terri Hasdorff	3,683	7.7
Republican	Michael Thompson	2,616	5.5
Republican	Richard Evans	1,441	3.0
Total votes		47,876	100.0

==== Fundraising ====
Italics indicate a withdrawn candidate.

Campaign finance reports as of June 30, 2026
Candidate	Raised	Spent	Cash on hand
Lev Parnas (I)	$30,167	$28,839	$1,328
Source: Federal Election Commission

=== General election ===
==== Predictions ====
Source	Ranking	As of
Decision Desk HQ	Tossup	October 29, 2026
The Cook Political Report	Tossup	October 30, 2026
Inside Elections	Tossup	October 29, 2026
Sabato's Crystal Ball	Lean D	November 2, 2026
The Economist	Tossup	October 29, 2026

==== Post-primary endorsements ====
Pia Dandiya (D)

U.S. representatives

- Jason Crow, CO-06 (2019–present)

Party officials

- Ken Martin, chair of the Democratic National Committee (2025–present)

Labor unions

- United Auto Workers

Organizations

- Democratic Majority for Israel
- Jewish Democratic Council of America
- League of Conservation Voters Action Fund
- National Women's Political Caucus
Casey Askar (R)

Executive branch officials

- Donald Trump, 45th and 47th president of the United States (2017–2021, 2025–present)

U.S. representatives

- Richard Hudson, NC-09 (2013–present)

Statewide officials

- Ron DeSantis, governor of Florida (2019–present)

Organizations

- NRCC MAGA Majority

==== Fundraising ====
Campaign finance reports as of October 14, 2026
Candidate	Raised	Spent	Cash on hand
Pia Dandiya (D)	$4,619,822	$3,884,717	$735,105
Casey Askar (R)	$7,418,255	$5,527,093	$1,891,162
Source: Federal Election Commission

==== Polling ====
Poll source	Date(s) administered	Sample size	Margin of error	Pia Dandiya (D)	Casey Askar (R)	Undecided
Tulchin Research (D)	August 24–31, 2026	–	–	46%	44%	10%
Tavern Research (D)	August 10–12, 2026	551 (LV)	± 4.9%	50%	50%	–

Hypothetical polling

Pia Dandiya vs. Belinda Keiser

Poll source	Date(s) administered	Sample size	Margin of error	Pia Dandiya (D)	Belinda Keiser (R)	Undecided
GQR (D) (Note: Poll sponsored by Dandiya's campaign)	June 18–25, 2026	400 (LV)	± 4.9%	45%	46%	10%

Generic Republican vs. Generic Democrat

Poll source	Date(s) administered	Sample size	Margin of error	Generic Democrat	Generic Republican	Undecided
GQR (D)	June 18–25, 2026	400 (LV)	± 4.9%	43%	45%	12%

==== Results ====
2026 Florida's 22nd congressional district election
Party	Candidate	Votes	%	±%
Democratic	Pia Dandiya			
Republican	Casey Askar			
Total votes				

== District 23 ==
2026 Florida's 23rd congressional district election
- Reporting: 99% as of Nov 9 at 5:46 PM EST
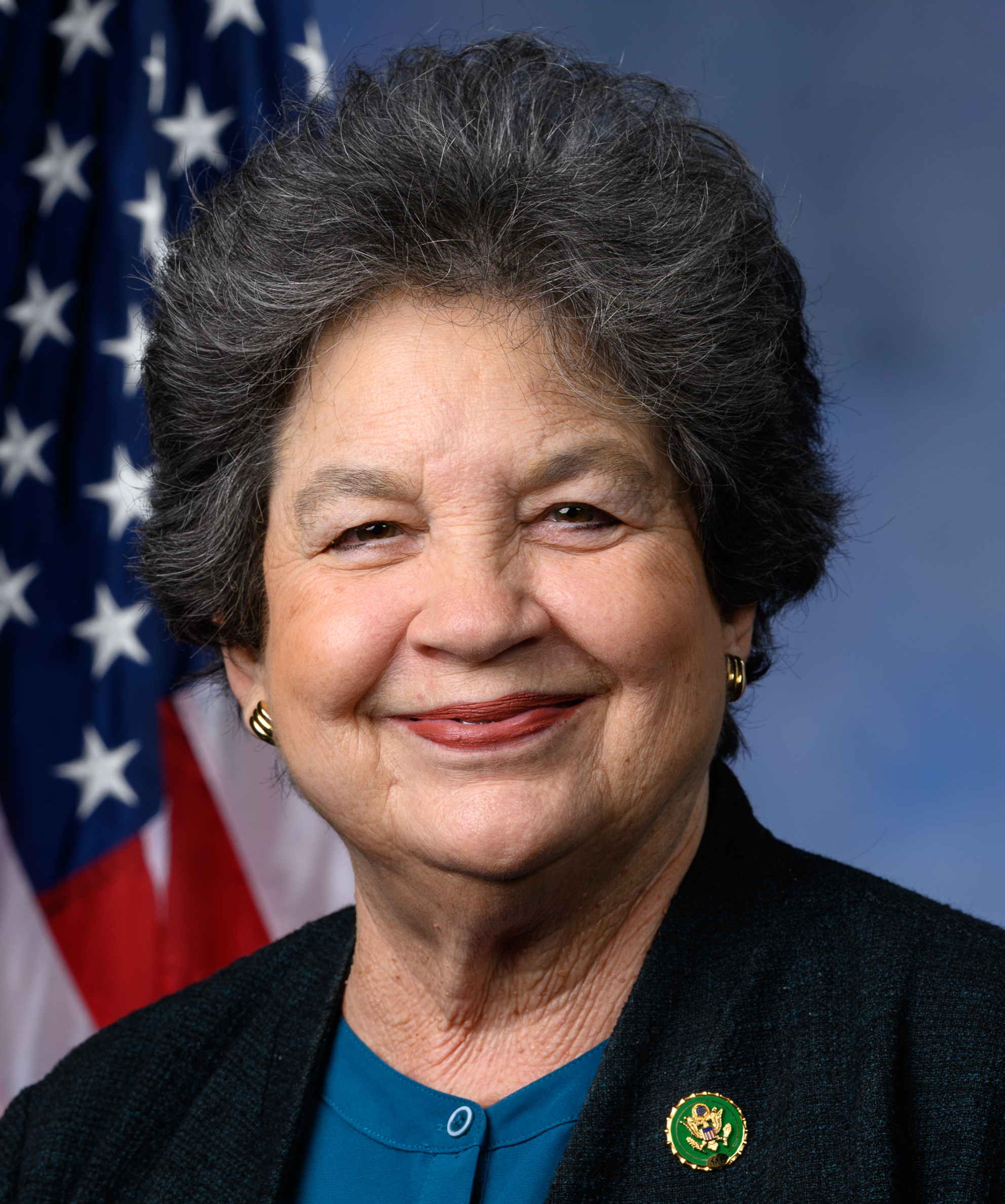

Nominee	Lois Frankel	Deborah Adeimy
Party	Democratic	Republican
Popular vote	170,028	88,939
Percentage	65.7%	34.3%
U.S. Representative before election
Jared Moskowitz
Democratic
Elected U.S. Representative
Lois Frankel
Democratic

Florida's 23rd congressional district boundary from the 2026 elections Interactive map version

The 23rd district covers parts of Broward County and southern Palm Beach County, including the cities of Boca Raton, Coral Springs, and most of Deerfield Beach and Fort Lauderdale. The incumbent is Democrat Jared Moskowitz, who was re-elected with 52.4% of the vote in 2024.

=== Democratic primary ===
==== Nominee ====
- Lois Frankel, incumbent U.S. representative from the 22nd district (previously ran in the 22nd district)

==== Eliminated in primary ====
- Victoria Doyle, attorney (previously ran in the 22nd district)
- Mark Piper

==== Withdrawn ====
- Oliver Larkin, digital strategist and union organizer (running in the 25th district)
- Jared Moskowitz, incumbent U.S. representative (running in the 25th district)

==== Endorsements ====
Victoria Doyle

Organizations

- Democratic Hispanic Caucus of Florida
Lois Frankel

Labor unions

- AFGE
- Florida AFL-CIO
- United Auto Workers

Organizations

- AIPAC
- Democratic Majority for Israel
- Jewish Democratic Council of America
- Joint Action Committee for Political Affairs
- National Women's Political Caucus
- Planned Parenthood Action Fund
- Population Connection
- Reproductive Freedom for All
- Sierra Club

==== Polling ====
Hypothetical polling

Oliver Larkin vs. Jared Moskowitz

Poll source	Date(s) administered	Sample size	Margin of error	Oliver Larkin	Jared Moskowitz	Undecided
Center for Strategic Politics (Note: Poll sponsored by Larkin's campaign)	February 28 – March 5, 2026	491 (LV)	± 4.4%	11%	45%	44%

Jared Moskowitz vs. A Progressive Challenger

Poll source	Date(s) administered	Sample size	Margin of error	Jared Moskowitz	A Progressive Challenger	Undecided
Center for Strategic Politics	February 28 – March 5, 2026	491 (LV)	± 4.4%	41%	21%	37%

==== Fundraising ====
Campaign finance reports as of June 30, 2026
Candidate	Raised	Spent	Cash on hand
Victoria Doyle (D)	$341,018 (Note: $200,120 was self funded)	$340,053	$965
Lois Frankel (D)	$2,215,066	$927,145	$1,575,364
Source: Federal Election Commission

==== Results ====
Democratic primary results
Party	Candidate	Votes	%
Democratic	Lois Frankel (incumbent)	42,964	74.7
Democratic	Victoria Doyle	13,438	23.4
Democratic	Mark Piper	1,096	1.9
Total votes		57,498	100.0

=== Republican primary ===
==== Nominee ====
- Deborah Adeimy, financial advisor and candidate for the 22nd district in 2022 and 2024 (previously running in the 22nd district)

==== Eliminated in primary ====
- Paola Branda, educator

==== Withdrawn ====
- Sendra Dorce
- George Moraitis, former state representative from the 93rd district (2010–2018) (running in the 25th district)
- Scott Singer, mayor of Boca Raton (2018–2026) (running in the 25th district)
- Darlene Cerezo Swaffar, insurance agency owner and candidate for this district in 2022 and 2024

==== Fundraising ====
Italics indicate a withdrawn or disqualified candidate.

Campaign finance reports as of June 30, 2026
Candidate	Raised	Spent	Cash on hand
Deborah Adeimy (R)	$156,044 (Note: $84,053 was self funded)	$123,904	$35,748
Paola Branda (R)	$21,839 (Note: $21,722 was self funded)	$21,677	$162
Sendra Dorcé (R)	$9,314	$4,833	$4,491
Jared Gurfein (R)	$28,053	$16,276	$11,777
Darlene Cerezo Swaffar (R)	$6,250	$6,432	$0
Source: Federal Election Commission

==== Results ====
Republican primary results
Party	Candidate	Votes	%
Republican	Deborah Adeimy	20,641	73.7
Republican	Paola Branda	7,377	26.3
Total votes		28,018	100.0

=== General election ===
==== Predictions ====
Source	Ranking	As of
Decision Desk HQ	Safe D	July 14, 2026
The Cook Political Report	Solid D	May 8, 2026
Inside Elections	Solid D	May 5, 2026
Sabato's Crystal Ball	Safe D	May 4, 2026
The Economist	Safe D	May 6, 2026

==== Post-primary endorsements ====
Lois Frankel (D)

Labor unions

- National Education Association

Organizations

- Giffords

==== Fundraising ====
Campaign finance reports as of October 14, 2026
Candidate	Raised	Spent	Cash on hand
Lois Frankel (D)	$2,631,968	$2,355,306	$564,090
Deborah Adeimy (R)	$201,145	$171,963	$32,790
Source: Federal Election Commission

==== Results ====
2026 Florida's 23rd congressional district election
Party	Candidate	Votes	%	±%
Democratic	Lois Frankel (incumbent)			
Republican	Deborah Adeimy			
Total votes				

== District 24 ==
2026 Florida's 24th congressional district election
- Reporting: 99% as of Nov 9 at 6:09 PM EST
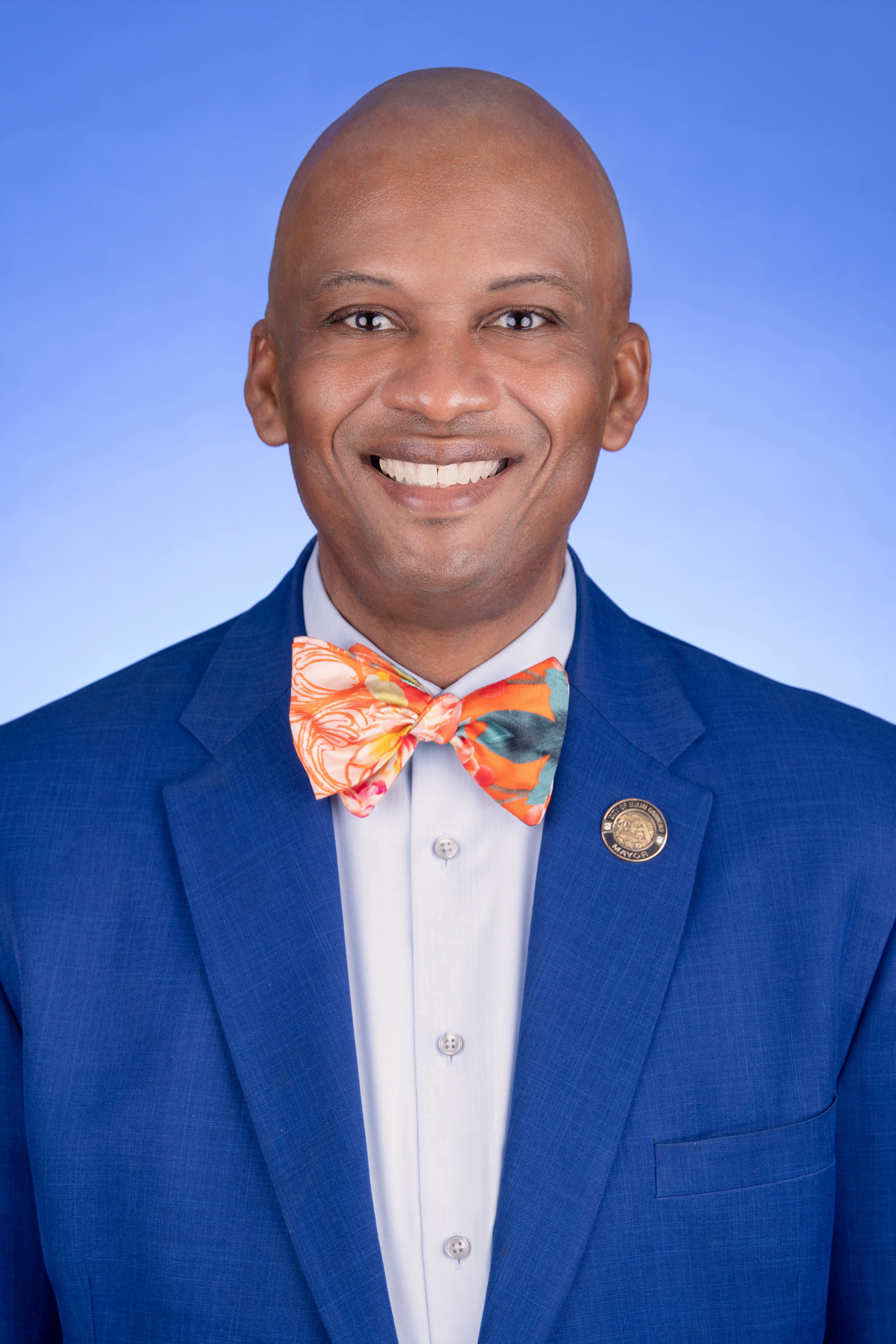

Nominee	Oliver Gilbert	Mayonna Te Brown
Party	Democratic	Republican
Popular vote	164,890	39,545
Percentage	80.7%	19.3%
U.S. Representative before election
Frederica Wilson
Democratic
Elected U.S. Representative
Oliver Gilbert
Democratic

Florida's 24th congressional district boundary from the 2026 elections Interactive map version

The incumbent is Democrat Frederica Wilson, who was re-elected with 68.2% of the vote in 2024. She announced in May 2026 that she would not seek another term.

=== Democratic primary ===
==== Nominee ====
- Oliver Gilbert, Miami-Dade County commissioner (2020–present)

==== Eliminated in primary ====
- Marshall Davis Sr., director and founder of the Marshall L. Davis, Sr. African Heritage Cultural Arts Center
- Shevrin Jones, state senator from the 34th district (2020–present)
- Kendrick Meek Jr., attorney and son of former U.S. representative Kendrick Meek
- Rudy Moise, doctor and candidate for this district in 2010 and 2012 (previously ran in the 20th district)
- Jean Monestime, former Miami-Dade County commissioner
- Roderick Vereen

==== Withdrawn ====
- Christine Sanon-Jules, small business owner
- Frederica Wilson, incumbent U.S. representative (endorsed Gilbert)

==== Declined ====
- Kendrick Meek, former U.S. representative (2003–2011) and nominee for U.S. senate in 2010

==== Endorsements ====
Oliver Gilbert

U.S. representatives

- Frederica Wilson, FL-24 (2011–present)

Local officials

- Rodney Harris, mayor of Miami Gardens (2020–present)
- Eileen Higgins, mayor of Miami (2025–present)
- Daniella Levine Cava, mayor of Miami-Dade County (2020–present)

Labor unions

- Florida AFL-CIO (co-endorsement with Jones)
- SEIU 32BJ
- SEIU Local 1991
- South Florida Council of Firefighters
- UNITE HERE Local 355
Shevrin Jones

U.S. representatives

- Greg Casar, TX-35 (2023–present)
- Maxwell Frost, FL-10 (2023–present)
- Robert Garcia, CA-42 (2023–present)
- Pramila Jayapal, WA-7 (2017–present)
- Ritchie Torres, NY-15 (2021–present)

State legislators

- Kristen Arrington, state senator from the 25th district (2024–present)
- Lori Berman, minority leader of the Florida Senate (2025–present) from the 31st district (2018–present)
- LaVon Bracy Davis, state senator from the 15th district (2025–present)
- Daryl Campbell, state representative from the 99th district (2022–present)
- Dan Daley, state representative from the 96th district (2019–present)
- Tracie Davis, state senator from the 5th district (2022–present)
- Jervonte Edmonds, state representative from the 88th district (2022–present)
- Anna Eskamani, state representative from the 42nd district (2018–present)
- Gallop Franklin, state representative from the 8th district (2022–present)
- Ashley Gantt, state representative from the 109th district (2022–present)
- Rita Harris, state representative from the 44th district (2022–present)
- Yvonne Hayes Hinson, state representative from the 21st district (2020–present)
- Jason Pizzo, former minority leader of the Florida Senate (2024–2025) from the 37th district (2018–present) (Independent)
- Tina Polsky, state senator from the 30th district (2020–present)
- Michele Rayner, state representative from the 62nd district (2020–present)
- Kelly Skidmore, state representative from the 92nd district (2006–2010, 2020–present)
- Carlos Guillermo Smith, state senator from the 17th district (2024–present)
- RaShon Young, state representative from the 40th district (2025–present)

Local officials

- 7 county comissioners (Note: Tom Good, Pembroke Pines commissioner; Jay Schwartz, Pembroke Pines commissioner; Brandon Smith, West Park commissioner; Sherelean Bass, Opa-locka commissioner; Natasha Ervin, Opa-locka commissioner; Luis Santiago, Opa-locka commissioner; Alexandra Davis, Broward County commissioner)
- 3 mayors (Note: Felicia Brunson, mayor of West Park; Angelo Castillo, mayor of Pembroke Pines; Josh Levy, mayor Hollywood)

Individuals

- Teddy Bridgewater, former NFL player

Labor unions

- 1199 SEIU Florida
- Florida AFL-CIO (co-endorsement with Gilbert)
- IAFF Local 4321 Florida
- United Teachers of Dade

Organizations

- 314 Action
- Congressional Progressive Caucus
- Democratic Hispanic Caucus of Florida
- Democratic Progressive Caucus of Florida
- Dolphin Democrats
- Equality Florida
- Equality PAC
- LGBTQ Victory Fund

Newspapers

- Miami Herald
Kendrick Meek Jr.

U.S. senators

- Bill Nelson, former Florida (2001–2019)

U.S. representatives

- Joyce Beatty, OH-3 (2013–present)
- Jim Clyburn, SC-06 (1993–present)
- Steven Horsford, NV-04 (2019–present)
- Nancy Pelosi, CA-12 (1987–present)

Local officials

- Dorothy Bendross-Mindingall, Miami-Dade School Board member

Individuals

- Alonzo Mourning, former NBA player

Labor unions

- SMART
Frederica Wilson (withdrawn)

Organizations

- AIPAC
- Planned Parenthood Action Fund
- Southern Poverty Law Center Action Fund

==== Fundraising ====
Italics indicate a withdrawn candidate.

Campaign finance reports as of July 29, 2026
Candidate	Raised	Spent	Cash on hand
Oliver Gilbert (D)	$812,143	$583,050	$229,093
Shevrin Jones (D)	$283,695	$205,083	$78,612
Kendrick Meek Jr. (D)	$657,619	$542,847	$114,772
Rudolph Moise (D)	$651,697 (Note: $300,000 was self funded)	$555,846	$100,851
Jean Monestime (D)	$95,065	$69,161	$25,904
Frederica Wilson (D)	$153,142	$260,135	$390,207
Source: Federal Election Commission

==== Debate ====
2026 Florida's 24th congressional district Democratic primary debate
No.	Date	Host	Moderator(s)	Link	Democratic	Democratic	Democratic	Democratic	Democratic	Democratic	Democratic
Key: P Participant A Absent N Not invited I Invited W Withdrawn											
Key: P Participant A Absent N Not invited I Invited W Withdrawn					Marshall Davis	Oliver Gilbert	Shevrin Jones	Kendrick Meek	Rudy Moise	Jean Monestime	Roderick Vereen
1	June 30, 2026	Florida Memorial University	Loreal Arscott; Dwight Bullard	YouTube	P	P	P	P	A	P	P

==== Polling ====
Poll source	Date(s) administered	Sample size	Margin of error	Oliver Gilbert	Shevrin Jones	Kendrick Meek Jr.	Other	Undecided
St. Pete Polls	August 15–16, 2026	278 (LV)	± 5.9%	22%	39%	21%	18%	
St. Pete Polls	August 5–6, 2026	262 (RV)	± 6.1%	23%	33%	18%	26%	
National Victory Strategies (Note: Poll sponsored by Jones' campaign)	July 24–28, 2026	300 (LV)	–	28%	35%	9%	6% (Note: Marshall Davis 2%, Rudy Moise 2%, Jean Monestime 1%, Roderick Vereen 1%)	23%
National Victory Strategies	July 24–28, 2026	300 (LV)	–	27%	38%	13%	–	22%
St. Pete Polls	July 16–17, 2026	303 (RV)	± 5.6%	27%	24%	10%	3% (Note: Marshall Davis Sr., Rudy Moise, and Roderick Vereen with 1%; Jean Monestime with 0%)	36%

==== Results ====
Democratic primary results
Party	Candidate	Votes	%
Democratic	Oliver Gilbert	20,445	34.3
Democratic	Shevrin Jones	19,034	32.0
Democratic	Kendrick Meek Jr.	10,309	17.3
Democratic	Rudy Moise	4,520	7.6
Democratic	Jean Monestime	3,161	5.3
Democratic	Marshall Davis Sr.	1,272	2.1
Democratic	Roderick Vereen	779	1.3
Total votes		59,520	100.0

=== Republican primary ===
==== Nominee ====
- Mayonna Te Brown, entrepreneur and candidate for Illinois's 11th congressional district in 2026

==== Disqualified ====
- Patricia Gonzalez, businesswoman

==== Withdrawn ====
- Imtiaz Mohammad

==== Fundraising ====
Italics indicate a disqualified candidate.

Campaign finance reports as of June 30, 2026
Candidate	Raised	Spent	Cash on hand
Mayonna Te Brown (R)	$313,318 (Note: $306,068 was self funded)	$14,693	$298,626
Patricia Gonzalez (R)	$1,333 (Note: $1,200 was self funded)	$1,237	$96
Source: Federal Election Commission

=== Independents ===
==== Declared ====
- Andy Daro
- Patricia Gonzalez, businesswoman (write-in)

=== General election ===
==== Predictions ====
Source	Ranking	As of
Decision Desk HQ	Safe D	July 14, 2026
The Cook Political Report	Solid D	February 6, 2025
Inside Elections	Solid D	May 5, 2026
Sabato's Crystal Ball	Safe D	April 10, 2025
The Economist	Safe D	May 6, 2026

==== Fundraising ====
Campaign finance reports as of October 14, 2026
Candidate	Raised	Spent	Cash on hand
Oliver Gilbert (D)	$1,458,355	$1,031,061	$427,295
Mayonna Te Brown (R)	$313,459	$144,183	$169,276
Source: Federal Election Commission

==== Results ====
2026 Florida's 24th congressional district election
Party	Candidate	Votes	%	±%
Democratic	Oliver Gilbert			
Republican	Mayonna Te Brown			
Independent	Andy Daro			
Total votes				

== District 25 ==
2026 Florida's 25th congressional district election
- Reporting: 99% as of Nov 9 at 6:09 PM EST
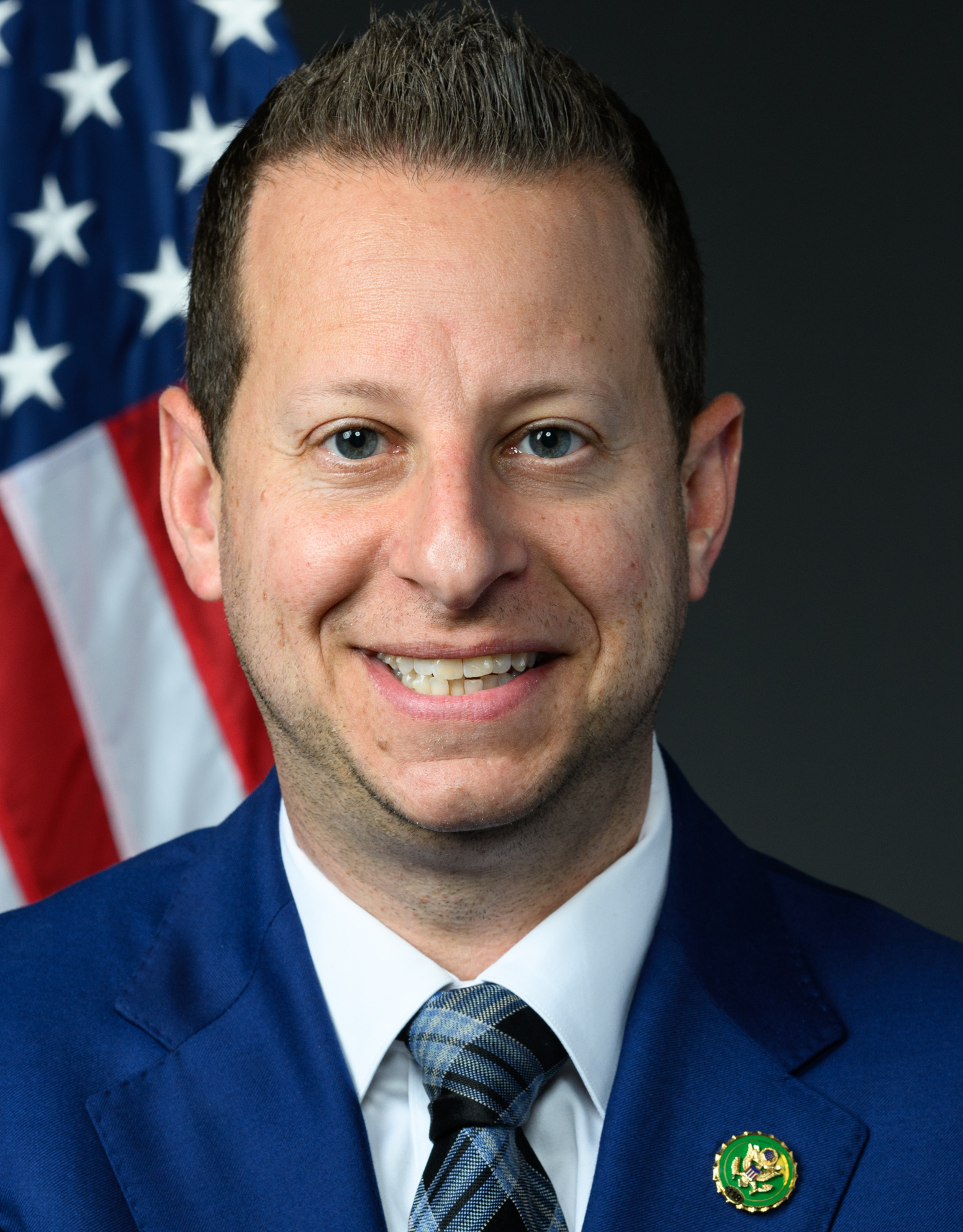

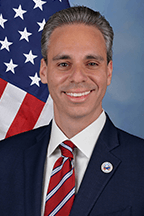
Nominee	Jared Moskowitz	Scott Singer
Party	Democratic	Republican
Popular vote	143,919	130,880
Percentage	51.3%	46.6%
U.S. Representative before election
Debbie Wasserman Schultz
Democratic
Elected U.S. Representative
Jared Moskowitz
Democratic

Florida's 25th congressional district boundary from the 2026 elections Interactive map version

The incumbent is Democrat Debbie Wasserman Schultz, who was re-elected with 54.5% of the vote in 2024.

The election was one of the most expensive congressional races in the 2026 elections, with over $42.2 million in spending.

=== Democratic primary ===
==== Nominee ====
- Jared Moskowitz, incumbent U.S. representative from the 23rd district (previously ran in the 23rd district)

==== Eliminated in primary ====
- Oliver Larkin, digital strategist and union organizer (previously ran in the 23rd district)

==== Withdrawn ====
- Debbie Wasserman Schultz, incumbent U.S. representative (running in the 20th district)

==== Endorsements ====
Oliver Larkin

U.S. representatives

- Jamaal Bowman, former NY-16 (2021–2025)

State legislators

- Angie Nixon, HD-13 (2020–present)
- Nina Turner, former Ohio's SD-25 (2008–2014)
- Claire Valdez, New York's AD-37 and Democratic nominee for NY-07

Individuals

- Hasan Piker, left-wing political activist
- Ms. Rachel, YouTuber and children's educator

Labor unions

- 1199 SEIU
- Association of Flight Attendants-CWA
- Communication Workers of America
- SEIU Florida Public Services Union

Organizations

- Council on American–Islamic Relations Action Florida
- Democratic Progressive Caucus of Florida
- Democratic Socialists of America (Note: Broward County Democratic Socialists of America; Miami Democratic Socialists of America; Orlando Democratic Socialists of America; Palm Beach & Treasure Coast Democratic Socialists of America)
- Dream Defenders
- Emgage Action
- Florida Young Democrats
- Friends of the Earth Action
- Gen-Z for Change
- Peace Action
- Progressive Change Campaign Committee
- Progressive Democrats of America
- Progressive Victory
- Track AIPAC
- Track Oil PACs
- US Campaign for Palestinian Rights
Jared Moskowitz

Labor unions

- AFGE
- AFSCME Florida
- Broward County AFL-CIO
- Broward Teachers Union
- UAW

Organizations

- AIPAC
- Brady PAC
- Democratic Congressional Campaign Committee
- Democratic Majority for Israel
- Dolphin Democrats
- Jewish Democratic Council of America
- Joint Action Committee for Political Affairs
- Planned Parenthood Action Fund
- Population Connection

Newspapers

- Miami Herald
- Palm Beach Post (Democratic primary only)
Declined to endorse

Labor unions

- Florida AFL-CIO

Newspapers

- Sun Sentinel

==== Fundraising ====
Campaign finance reports as of July 29, 2026
Candidate	Raised	Spent	Cash on hand
Oliver Larkin (D)	$689,403	$519,661	$169,741
Jared Moskowitz (D)	$2,998,428	$1,465,080	$1,882,634
Source: Federal Election Commission

==== Polling ====
Poll source	Date(s) administered	Sample size	Margin of error	Oliver Larkin	Jared Moskowitz	Undecided
Center for Strategic Politics	August 5, 2026	403 (LV)	± 4.9%	38%	40%	22%
Beacon Insights (Note: Poll sponsored by Moskowitz's campaign)	July 22, 2026	532 (LV)	± 4.3%	20%	56%	24%
Beacon Insights	June 25–26, 2026	728 (LV)	± 3.6%	19%	51%	30%
Beacon Insights	May 13–14, 2026	426 (LV)	–	12%	49%	39%

Hypothetical polling

Oliver Larkin vs. Jared Moskowitz vs. Debbie Wasserman Schultz

Poll source	Date(s) administered	Sample size	Margin of error	Oliver Larkin	Jared Moskowitz	Debbie Wasserman Schultz	Undecided
Middle Seat	May 5–6, 2026	388 (V)	± 5.0%	7%	29%	36%	28%

==== Results ====
Democratic primary results
Party	Candidate	Votes	%
Democratic	Jared Moskowitz (incumbent)	28,330	63.5
Democratic	Oliver Larkin	16,301	36.5
Total votes		44,631	100.0

=== Republican primary ===
==== Nominee ====
- Scott Singer, former mayor of Boca Raton (2018–2026) (previously ran in the 23rd district)

==== Eliminated in primary ====
- Dan Franzese, businessman and nominee for the 22nd district in 2022 and 2024 (previously ran in the 22nd district)
- Raven Harrison, businesswoman and candidate for Texas's 26th congressional district in 2022
- Joseph Kaufman, non-profit executive and perennial candidate
- George Moraitis, former state representative from the 93rd district (2010–2018) (previously ran in the 23rd district)

==== Withdrawn ====
- Michael Carbonara, businessman (ran in the 22nd district)

==== Declined ====
- Bryan Leib, businessman, nominee for Pennsylvania's 3rd congressional district in 2018, and candidate for this district in 2024 (endorsed Franzese)

==== Endorsements ====
Dan Franzese

U.S. representatives

- Brian Mast, FL-21 (2017–present)

Individuals

- Dick Morris, political consultant
- Roger Stone, political consultant
Raven Harrison

Organizations

- Veterans for America First
George Moraitis

U.S. representatives

- Gus Bilirakis, FL-12 (2007–present)
- Jake Ellzey, TX-06 (2021–present)
- Scott Franklin, FL-18 (2021–present)
- Mike Haridopolos, FL-08 (2025–present)
- Greg Steube, FL-17 (2019–present)

Newspapers

- Miami Herald
- Sun Sentinel
Scott Singer

Federal officials

- David Friedman, former U.S. ambassador to Israel (2017–2021)

U.S. representatives

- Carlos A. Giménez, FL-28 (2021–present)
- Steve Scalise, majority leader of the House of Representatives (2023–present) from LA-01 (2008–present)

Statewide officials

- James Uthmeier, attorney general of Florida

Local officials

- Tom Carney, Delray Beach mayor
- Goran Cuk, North Bay Village vice mayor
- Todd Drosky, Deerfield Beach mayor
- Michael Hudak, Deerfield Beach city commissioner
- Natasha Moore, Highland Beach mayor
- Jane Reiser, Hillsboro Beach commissioner
- Isaac Salver, Bay Harbor Islands mayor
- Seth Salver, Bal Harbor mayor
- Glenn Singer, Golden Beach mayor
- Deb Tarrant, former Hillsboro Beach mayor

==== Fundraising ====
Campaign finance reports as of July 29, 2026
Candidate	Raised	Spent	Cash on hand
Dan Franzese (R)	$1,488,421 (Note: $1,271,959 was self funded)	$1,026,705	$471,644
Raven Harrison (R)	$797,235 (Note: $548,968 was self funded)	$722,076	$75,160
George Moraitis (R)	$931,849	$660,015	$271,834
Scott Singer (R)	$2,245,960 (Note: $574,010 was self funded)	$1,779,741	$466,219
Claudia Villatoro (R)	$803,050	$58,418	$744,391
Source: Federal Election Commission

==== Debate ====
2026 Florida's 25th congressional district Republican primary debate
No.	Date	Host	Moderator	Link	Republican	Republican	Republican	Republican	Republican
Key: P Participant A Absent N Not invited I Invited W Withdrawn									
Key: P Participant A Absent N Not invited I Invited W Withdrawn					Dan Franzese	Raven Harrison	Joe Kaufman	George Moraitis	Scott Singer
1	June 27, 2026	Republican Party of Florida	Kimberly Leonard; Marc Caputo; Peter Schorsch	YouTube (Note: Starts around 3:07:12)	P	P	A	P	P

==== Polling ====
Poll source	Date(s) administered	Sample size	Margin of error	Dan Franzese	Raven Harrison	Joseph Kaufman	George Moraitis	Scott Singer	Undecided
McLaughlin & Associates (R) (Note: Poll sponsored by Franzese's campaign)	August 1–2, 2026	300 (LV)	± 5.7%	28%	2%	7%	23%	19%	21%
1892 Polling (R)	July 28–31, 2026	(LV)	± 4.9%	14%	3%	7%	13%	21%	42%
McLaughlin & Associates (R)	June 2026	–	–	19%	0%	3%	9%	25%	44%
McLaughlin & Associates (R)	May 2026	–	–	4%	0%	5%	14%	13%	64%

==== Results ====
Republican primary results
Party	Candidate	Votes	%
Republican	Scott Singer	11,896	31.4
Republican	George Moraitis	10,384	27.4
Republican	Dan Franzese	9,711	25.6
Republican	Joseph Kaufman	4,701	12.4
Republican	Raven Harrison	1,193	3.1
Total votes		37,885	100.0

=== Third-parties and independents ===
==== Declared ====
- Michaelangelo Hamilton (Independent) (write-in)
- Peter Jassenoff (Libertarian)

=== General election ===
==== Predictions ====
Source	Ranking	As of
Decision Desk HQ	Lean D	October 29, 2026
The Cook Political Report	Lean D	October 30, 2026
Inside Elections	Tilt D	October 29, 2026
Sabato's Crystal Ball	Lean D	October 27, 2026
The Economist	Lean D	October 30, 2026

==== Post-primary endorsements ====
Jared Moskowitz (D)

Labor unions

- National Education Association

Organizations

- Giffords
- League of Conservation Voters Action Fund
Scott Singer (R)

Executive branch officials

- Donald Trump, 45th and 47th president of the United States (2017–2021, 2025–present)

U.S. representatives

- Peter Deutsch, FL-25 (1993–2005) (Democratic)
- Richard Hudson, NC-09 (2013–present)

Statewide officials

- Ron DeSantis, governor of Florida (2019–present)

Individuals

- Ben Shapiro, political commentator

Organizations

- National Association of Police Organizations
- National Federation of Independent Business
- NRCC MAGA Majority
- Republican Jewish Coalition
- U.S. Chamber of Commerce

==== Fundraising ====
Campaign finance reports as of October 14, 2026
Candidate	Raised	Spent	Cash on hand
Jared Moskowitz (D)	$5,710,776	$4,849,990	$1,210,073
Scott Singer (R)	$3,255,313	$2,788,688	$466,625
Peter Jassenoff (L)	$10,500	$10,440	$60
Source: Federal Election Commission

==== Polling ====
Poll source	Date(s) administered	Sample size	Margin of error	Jared Moskowitz (D)	Scott Singer (R)	Undecided
Public Policy Polling (D)	October 26–27, 2026	523 (LV)	–	47%	41%	12%
Public Policy Polling (D)	October 21–22, 2026	592 (LV)	–	47%	42%	11%
National Research Inc. (R) (Note: Poll commissioned by the NRCC and Singer's campaign)	October 12–15, 2026	400 (LV)	± 4.9%	42%	49%	24%
	August 18, 2026	Primary elections				
Beacon Insights	May 1–2, 2026	461 (RV)	–	43%	33%	24%

Hypothetical polling

Oliver Larkin vs. George Moraitis

Poll source	Date(s) administered	Sample size	Margin of error	Oliver Larkin (D)	George Moraitis (R)	Undecided
Middle Seat	May 5–6, 2026	576 (V)	± 4.1%	43%	34%	23%

Oliver Larkin vs. Scott Singer

Poll source	Date(s) administered	Sample size	Margin of error	Oliver Larkin (D)	Scott Singer (R)	Undecided
Middle Seat	May 5–6, 2026	576 (V)	± 4.1%	45%	33%	22%

Jared Moskowitz vs. George Moraitis

Poll source	Date(s) administered	Sample size	Margin of error	Jared Moskowitz (D)	George Moraitis (R)	Undecided
Beacon Insights	May 1–2, 2026	461 (RV)	–	40%	39%	21%

Generic Democrat vs. generic Republican

Poll source	Date(s) administered	Sample size	Margin of error	Generic Democrat	Generic Republican	Undecided
Middle Seat	May 5–6, 2026	576 (V)	± 4.1%	51%	39%	10%

==== Results ====
2026 Florida's 25th congressional district election
Party	Candidate	Votes	%	±%
Democratic	Jared Moskowitz (incumbent)			
Republican	Scott Singer			
Libertarian	Peter Jassenoff			
Total votes			100.0%	

== District 26 ==
2026 Florida's 26th congressional district election
- Reporting: 99% as of Nov 9 at 6:09 PM EST
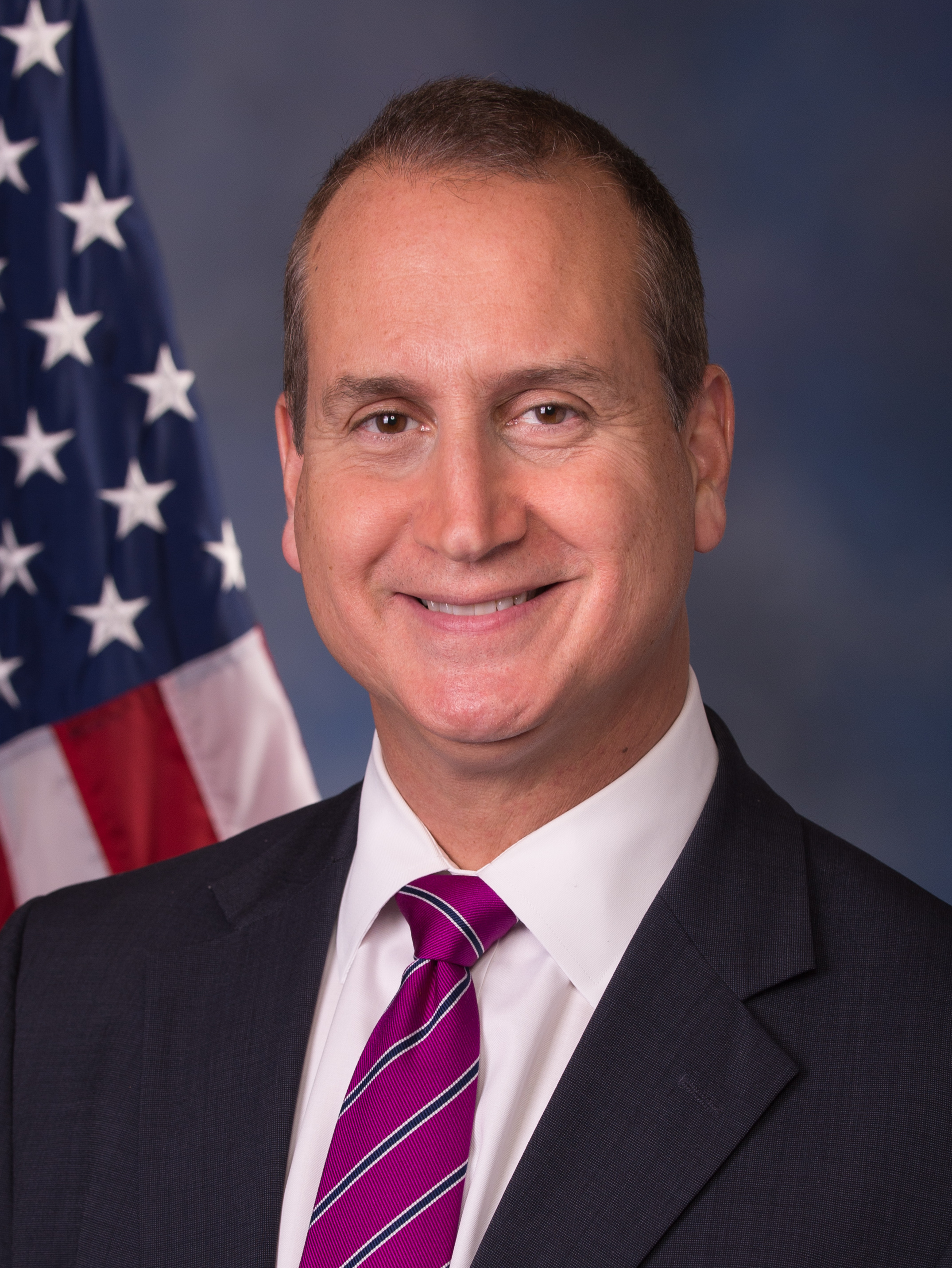

Nominee	Mario Díaz-Balart	Nicole Locklin
Party	Republican	Democratic
Popular vote	114,578	112,874
Percentage	49.9%	49.1%
U.S. Representative before election
Mario Diaz-Balart
Republican
Elected U.S. Representative
Mario Díaz-Balart
Republican

Florida's 26th congressional district boundary from the 2026 elections Interactive map version

The incumbent is Republican Mario Diaz-Balart, who was re-elected with 70.9% of the vote in 2024.

=== Republican primary ===
==== Nominee ====
- Mario Diaz-Balart, incumbent U.S. representative

==== Endorsements ====
Mario Diaz-Balart

Executive branch officials

- Donald Trump, president of the United States (2017–2021, 2025–present)

Labor unions

- Florida AFL-CIO

Organizations

- AIPAC
- Log Cabin Republicans

==== Fundraising ====
Campaign finance reports as of June 30, 2026
Candidate	Raised	Spent	Cash on hand
Mario Diaz-Balart (R)	$1,902,246	$1,269,136	$2,452,430
Source: Federal Election Commission

=== Democratic primary ===
==== Nominee ====
- Nicole Locklin, lawyer

==== Withdrawn ====
- Robyn Lawrence

==== Endorsements ====
Nicole Locklin

Organizations

- Democratic Progressive Caucus of Florida
- Dolphin Democrats
- National Women's Political Caucus
- Progressive Victory
- Track AIPAC

==== Fundraising ====
Campaign finance reports as of June 30, 2026
Candidate	Raised	Spent	Cash on hand
Yurina Gil (D)	$38,588 (Note: $10,000 was self funded)	$22,727	$17,079
Nicole Locklin (D)	$304,480 (Note: $250,000 was self funded)	$114,223	$190,257
Source: Federal Election Commission

=== Independents ===
==== Declared ====
- Deborah Ann Meidinger Hosey

=== General election ===
==== Predictions ====
Source	Ranking	As of
Decision Desk HQ	Likely R	July 14, 2026
The Cook Political Report	Solid R	February 6, 2025
Inside Elections	Solid R	May 5, 2026
Sabato's Crystal Ball	Safe R	April 10, 2025
The Economist	Likely R	May 6, 2026

==== Post-primary endorsements ====
Mario Diaz-Balart (R)

Labor unions

- United Auto Workers

==== Fundraising ====
Campaign finance reports as of October 14, 2026
Candidate	Raised	Spent	Cash on hand
Mario Diaz-Balart (R)	$2,763,196	$2,906,303	$1,676,213
Nicole Locklin (D)	$599,527	$489,537	$109,990
Source: Federal Election Commission

==== Results ====
2026 Florida's 26th congressional district election
Party	Candidate	Votes	%	±%
Republican	Mario Díaz-Balart (incumbent)			
Democratic	Nicole Locklin			
Independent	Deborah Ann Meidinger Hosey			
Total votes				

== District 27 ==
2026 Florida's 27th congressional district election
- Reporting: 99% as of Nov 9 at 6:09 PM EST
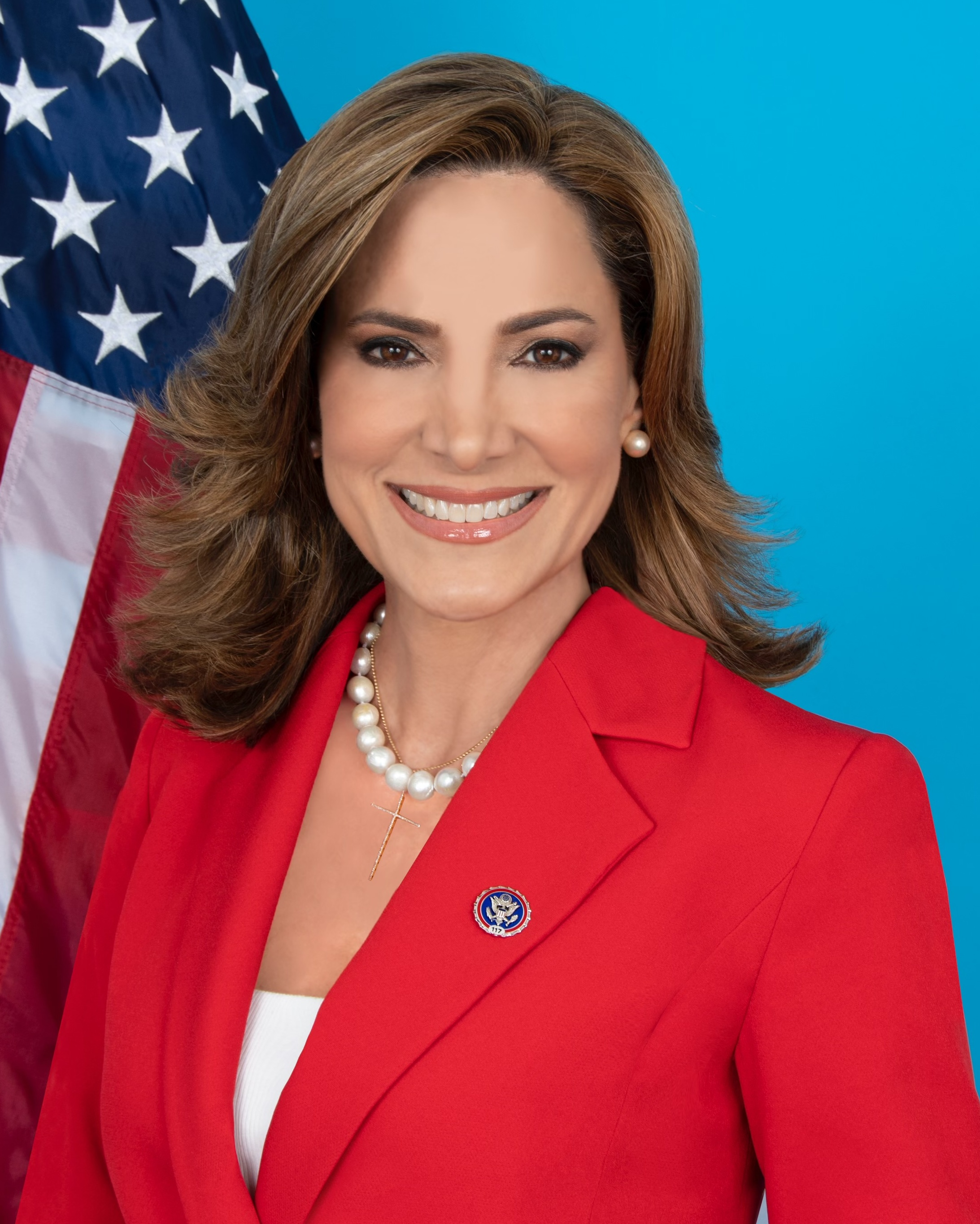

Nominee	Maria Elvira Salazar	Eliott Rodriguez
Party	Republican	Democratic
Popular vote	124,528	123,438
Percentage	50.2%	49.8%
U.S. Representative before election
María Elvira Salazar
Republican
Elected U.S. Representative
TBD

Florida's 27th congressional district boundary from the 2026 elections Interactive map version

The incumbent is Republican Maria Elvira Salazar, who was re-elected with 60.4% of the vote in 2024.

=== Republican primary ===
==== Nominee ====
- Maria Elvira Salazar, incumbent U.S. representative

==== Eliminated in primary ====
- Vincent Michael Arias, attorney

==== Endorsements ====
Maria Elvira Salazar

Executive branch officials

- ~~Donald Trump, president of the United States (2017–2021, 2025–present)~~ (endorsement rescinded after primary)

Local officials

- Rosie Cordero-Stutz, sheriff of Miami-Dade County (2025–present)
- 6 mayors (Note: Joseph Corradino, mayor of Pinecrest (2016–present); Karyn Cunningham, mayor of Palmetto Bay; Eric Diaz-Padron, mayor of West Miami; Vince Lago, mayor of Coral Gables; Tim Meerbott, mayor of Cutler Bay; Joe Rasco, mayor of Key Biscayne)

Organizations

- AIPAC
- Florida State Fraternal Order of Police District 6
- Log Cabin Republicans
- Maggie's List
- National Federation of Independent Business
- U.S. Chamber of Commerce

==== Fundraising ====
Campaign finance reports as of June 30, 2026
Candidate	Raised	Spent	Cash on hand
Vincent Arias (R)	$133,964 (Note: $99,000 was self funded)	$76,998	$56,966
Maria Elvira Salazar (R)	$1,951,030	$1,095,254	$2,266,603
Source: Federal Election Commission

==== Results ====
Republican primary results
Party	Candidate	Votes	%
Republican	Maria Elvira Salazar (incumbent)	29,233	81.3
Republican	Vincent Michael Arias	6,703	18.7
Total votes		35,936	100.0

=== Democratic primary ===
==== Nominee ====
- Eliott Rodriguez, television journalist

==== Eliminated in primary ====
- Robin Peguero, attorney and former investigative counsel for the January 6 Committee

==== Withdrawn ====
- Mike Davey, former mayor of Key Biscayne and candidate for this district in 2024 (endorsed Peguero)
- Richard Lamondin, environmental services company CEO (running for state senate)
- Lev Parnas, businessman (ran in the 22nd district as an independent)

==== Endorsements ====
Robin Peguero

U.S. representatives

- Lois Frankel, FL-22 (2013–present)
- Glenn Ivey, MD-04 (2023–present)
- Linda Sánchez, CA-38 (2013–present)
- Donna Shalala, former FL-27 (2019–2021)

State legislators

- Daisy Baez, former state representative from the 114th district (2016–2017)
- ~~Annie Betancourt, former state representative from the 116th district (1994–2002)~~ (switched endorsement to Rodriguez)
- Ashley Gantt, state representative from the 109th district (2022–present)
- ~~Juan-Carlos Planas, former state representative from the 114th district (2002–2010) (Democrat, served as a Republican)~~ (switched endorsement to Rodriguez)

Local officials

- Mike Davey, former mayor of Key Biscayne and candidate for this district in 2024
- ~~Joe Geller, Miami-Dade County Public Schools board member (2024–present), former state representative (2014–2022)~~ (switched endorsement to Rodriguez)
- Philip Stoddard, former mayor of South Miami (2010–2020)

Individuals

- Marvin Dunn, historian and educator

Organizations

- CHC BOLD PAC
- Congressional Black Caucus PAC
- Latino Victory Fund
Eliott Rodriguez

Executive branch officials

- Michael M. Adler, former U.S. ambassador to Belgium (2022–2025)
- Francisco O. Mora, former U.S. ambassador to the Organization of American States (2022–2025)

U.S. representatives

- Ron Klein, FL-22 (2007–2011)

State legislators

- Mike Abrams, former state representative (1983–1994)
- Annie Betancourt, former state representative from the 116th district (1994–2002) (previously endorsed Peguero)
- Luis Garcia, former state representative from the 107th district (2006–2012)
- Shevrin Jones, state senator from the 34th district (2020–present) (previously endorsed Lamondin)
- Juan-Carlos Planas, former state representative from the 114th district (2002–2010) (Democrat, served as a Republican) (previously endorsed Peguero)

Local officials

- Matti Bower, former mayor of Miami Beach (2007–2013)
- Manny Diaz, former mayor of Miami (2001–2009)
- Javier Fernandez, mayor of South Miami, former state representative (2018–2020)
- Dan Gelber, former mayor of Miami Beach (2017–2023)
- Joe Geller, Miami-Dade County Public Schools board member (2024–present), former state representative (2014–2022) (previously endorsed Peguero)
- Ken Russell, former Miami city commissioner from the 2nd district (2015–2022) and candidate for this seat in 2022 (previously endorsed Lamondin)
- Don Slesnick, former mayor of Coral Gables (2001–2011)

Individuals

- L. Felice Gorordo, former U.S. executive director of the World Bank
- Alberto Ibargüen, former president and CEO of the Knight Foundation
- Eduardo J. Padrón, former president of Miami Dade College
- Stephen Zack, former president of the American Bar Association (2010–2011)

Newspapers

- Miami Herald

Labor unions

- SEIU 32BJ
- SEIU Florida
- SEIU Healthcare Florida Local 1991
Richard Lamondin (withdrawn)

State legislators

- Kevin Chambliss, state representative from the 117th district (2020–present)
- ~~Shevrin Jones, state senator from the 34th district (2020–present)~~ (switched endorsement to Rodriguez after Lamondin withrew)

Local officials

- David Richardson, former Miami Beach city commissioner (2019–2023) and candidate for this seat in 2018
- ~~Ken Russell, former Miami city commissioner from the 2nd district (2015–2022) and candidate for this seat in 2022~~ (switched endorsement to Rodriguez after Lamondin withrew)
- Luisa Santos, member of the Miami-Dade County School Board

==== Fundraising ====
Italics indicate a withdrawn candidate.

Campaign finance reports as of June 30, 2026
Candidate	Raised	Spent	Cash on hand
Mike Davey (D)	$45,190	$28,247	$12,609
Alex Fornino (D) (Note: As of March 31, 2026)	$25,150 (Note: $24,691 was self funded)	$24,815	$0
Richard Lamondin (D) (Note: As of June 25, 2026)	$743,712 (Note: $145,450 was self funded)	$743,712	$0
Lev Parnas (D) (Note: As of March 31, 2026)	$27,336	$0	$27,336
Robin Peguero (D)	$1,022,259	$538,801	$483,458
Elliott Rodriguez (D)	$616,733	$171,193	$445,540
Source: Federal Election Commission

==== Polling ====
Poll source	Date(s) administered	Sample size	Margin of error	Richard Lamondin	Robin Peguero	Elliot Rodriguez	Undecided
Bendixen & Amandi International (D) (Note: Poll sponsored by Rodriguez's campaign)	June 15–18, 2026	300 (LV)	± 5.6%	–	28%	54%	18%
Bendixen & Amandi International (D)	March 4–9, 2026	400 (LV)	± 4.9%	14%	16%	43%	27%

==== Results ====
Democratic primary results
Party	Candidate	Votes	%
Democratic	Eliott Rodriguez	17,332	53.5
Democratic	Robin Peguero	15,056	46.5
Total votes		32,388	100.0

=== General election ===
==== Predictions ====
Source	Ranking	As of
Decision Desk HQ	Lean R	November 3, 2026
The Cook Political Report	Lean R	September 25, 2026
Inside Elections	Lean R	September 17, 2026
Sabato's Crystal Ball	Lean R	September 22, 2026
The Economist	Safe R	May 6, 2026

==== Post-primary endorsements ====
María Elvira Salazar (R)

International politicians

- Abelardo de la Espriella, president of Colombia (2026–present) (Defenders of the Homeland)
- María Corina Machado, member of the National Assembly of Venezuela (2011–2014) and 2025 Nobel Peace Prize laureate (Vente Venezuela)
- Javier Milei, president of Argentina (2023–present) (La Libertad Avanza)
Eliott Rodriguez (D)

U.S. representatives

- Suzan DelBene, WA-01 (2012–present)

Local officials

- Eileen Higgins, mayor of Miami (2025–present)
- Daniella Levine Cava, mayor of Miami-Dade County (2020–present)

Organizations

- DCCC Red to Blue
- Democratic Majority for Israel
- J Street
- Jewish Democratic Council of America
- MoveOn

==== Fundraising ====
Campaign finance reports as of October 14, 2026
Candidate	Raised	Spent	Cash on hand
María Elvira Salazar (R)	$2,519,401	$2,249,750	$1,680,478
Eliott Rodriguez (D)	$1,567,393	$945,602	$621,791
Source: Federal Election Commission

==== Polling ====
Poll source	Date(s) administered	Sample size	Margin of error	María Elvira Salazar (R)	Eliott Rodriguez (D)	Undecided
Tulchin Research (D)	September 8–13, 2026	600 (LV)	–	47%	46%	7%
Bendixen & Amandi International (D) (Note: Poll sponsored by the Democratic Congressional Campaign Committee, which supports Rodriguez)	August 25–30, 2026	600 (LV)	± 4.0%	45%	45%	10%
Blueprint Polling (D)	March 6–8, 2026	451 (RV)	± 4.61%	46%	43%	11%

Hypothetical polling

María Elvira Salazar vs. Alex Fornino

Poll source	Date(s) administered	Sample size	Margin of error	María Elvira Salazar (R)	Alex Fornino (D)	Undecided
Kaplan Strategies	Late July 2025	804 (LV)	± 3.0%	45%	35%	21%

María Elvira Salazar vs. Daniella Levine Cava

Poll source	Date(s) administered	Sample size	Margin of error	María Elvira Salazar (R)	Daniella Levine Cava (D)	Undecided
Kaplan Strategies	Late July 2025	804 (LV)	± 3.0%	42%	44%	14%

María Elvira Salazar vs. Mike Davey

Poll source	Date(s) administered	Sample size	Margin of error	María Elvira Salazar (R)	Mike Davey (D)	Undecided
Kaplan Strategies	Late July 2025	804 (LV)	± 3.0%	45%	38%	17%

María Elvira Salazar vs. Richard Lamondin

Poll source	Date(s) administered	Sample size	Margin of error	María Elvira Salazar (R)	Richard Lamondin (D)	Undecided
Kaplan Strategies	Late July 2025	804 (LV)	± 3.0%	45%	34%	20%
MDW Communications (Note: Poll sponsored by EDGE Communications, which works for Lamondin's campaign)	April 9–12, 2025	555 (LV)	± 3.0%	46%	43%	11%

María Elvira Salazar vs. Robin Peguero

Poll source	Date(s) administered	Sample size	Margin of error	María Elvira Salazar (R)	Robin Peguero (D)	Undecided
Blueprint Polling (D)	March 6–8, 2026	451 (RV)	± 4.61%	47%	40%	13%

==== Results ====
On November 3, Salazar lead by a 0.54% margin, just outside of the 0.5% recount threshold, but by November 4 the lead changed to 0.46%. On November 7, a machine recount was announced, which confirmed Salazar's victory on November 10.

2026 Florida's 27th congressional district election
Party	Candidate	Votes	%	±%
Republican	María Elvira Salazar (incumbent)			
Democratic	Eliott Rodriguez			
Total votes			100.0%	

== District 28 ==
2026 Florida's 28th congressional district election
- Reporting: 99% as of Nov 9 at 6:09 PM EST
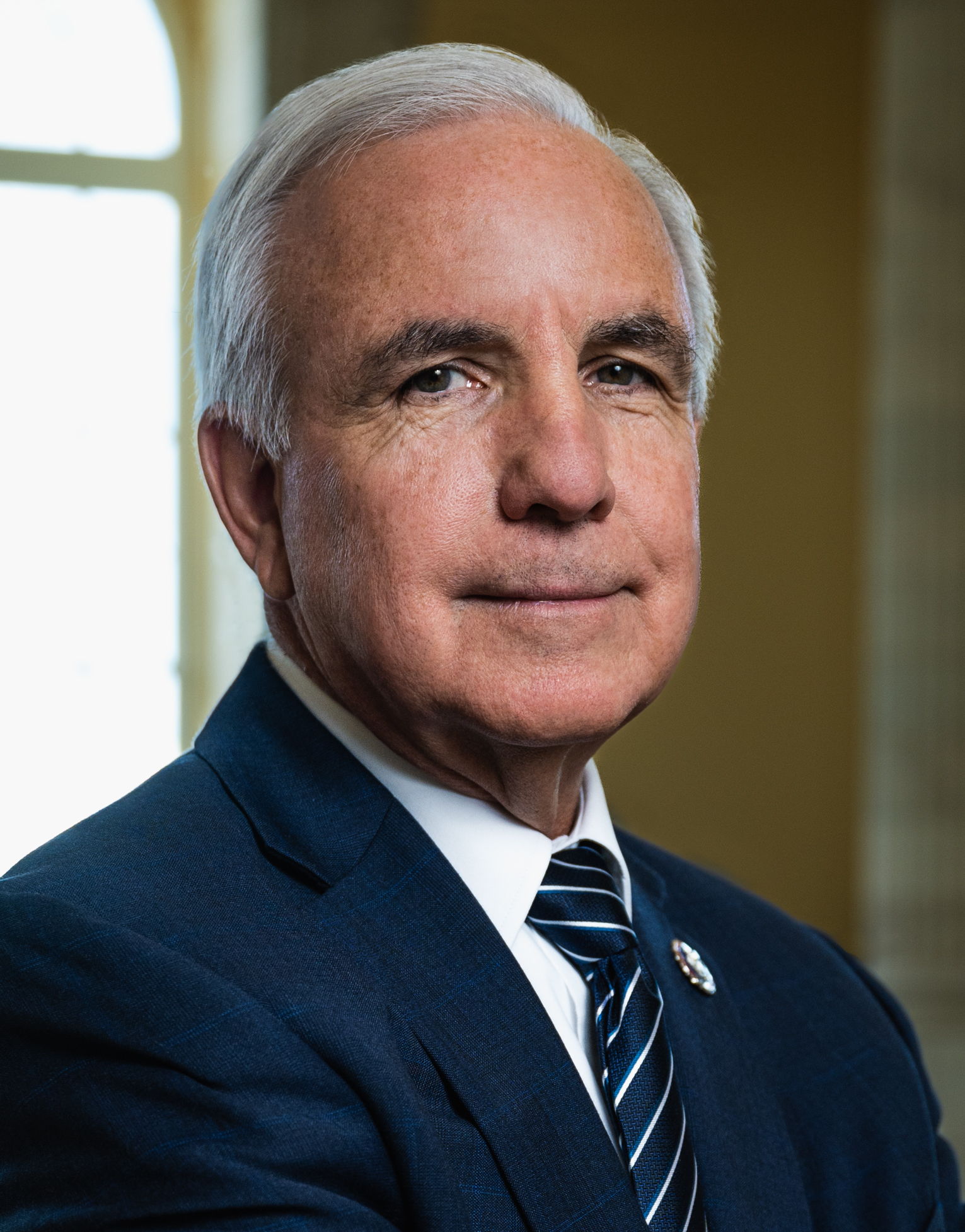

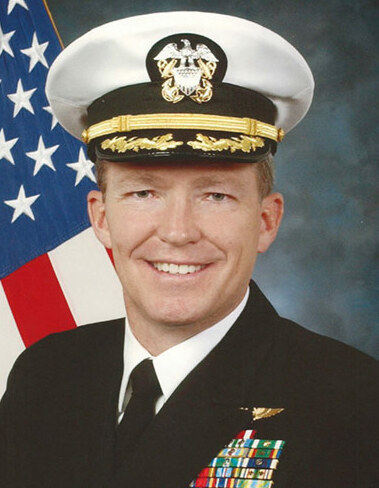
Nominee	Carlos Giménez	Phil Ehr
Party	Republican	Democratic
Popular vote	125,030	107,901
Percentage	52.9%	45.6%
U.S. Representative before election
Carlos Giménez
Republican
Elected U.S. Representative
Carlos Giménez
Republican

Florida's 28th congressional district boundary from the 2026 elections Interactive map version

The incumbent is Republican Carlos Giménez, who was re-elected with 64.6% of the vote in 2024.

=== Republican primary ===
==== Nominee ====
- Carlos Giménez, incumbent U.S. representative

==== Endorsements ====
Carlos Giménez

Executive branch officials

- Donald Trump, president of the United States (2017–2021, 2025–present)

Organizations

- AIPAC
- Log Cabin Republicans

==== Fundraising ====
Campaign finance reports as of June 30, 2026
Candidate	Raised	Spent	Cash on hand
Carlos Giménez (R)	$567,482	$443,993	$699,517
Source: Federal Election Commission

=== Democratic primary ===
==== Nominee ====
- Phil Ehr, nonprofit executive, former Navy commander, nominee for this district in 2024, nominee for the 1st district in 2020 and candidate in 2018

==== Withdrawn ====
- Hector Mujica, tech executive (previously ran for U.S. Senate)

==== Declined ====
- Robin Peguero, attorney and former investigative counsel for the January 6 Committee (ran in the 27th district)

==== Endorsements ====
Phil Ehr

Executive branch officials

- Luis Moreno, former U.S. ambassador to Jamaica (2014–2017)

U.S. representatives

- Debbie Mucarsel-Powell, FL-26 (2019–2021)

State legislators

- Angie Nixon, state representative from the 13th district (2020–present)

Local officials

- Tom Keen, Orlando city commissioner (2026–present)

Individuals

- Marvin Dunn, historian
Hector Mujica (withdrawn)

U.S. senators

- Ruben Gallego, United States senator from Arizona (2025–present)

U.S. representatives

- Joaquin Castro, TX-20 (2013–present)
- Teresa Leger Fernández, NM-03 (2021–present)
- Raul Ruiz, CA-25 (2013–present)
- Adam Smith, WA-09 (1997–present)

Local officials

- Daniella Levine Cava, mayor of Miami-Dade County (2020–present)

Individuals

- Alex Vindman, former director of European affairs for the U.S. National Security Council, whistleblower in the 2019 Trump–Ukraine scandal, and candidate for U.S. Senate in 2026

==== Fundraising ====
Campaign finance reports as of June 30, 2026
Candidate	Raised	Spent	Cash on hand
Phil Ehr (D)	$438,286 (Note: $343,200 was self funded)	$76,322	$454,610
Source: Federal Election Commission

=== Independents ===
==== Declared ====
- Eddy Rojas, businessman

=== General election ===
==== Predictions ====
Source	Ranking	As of
Decision Desk HQ	Safe R	July 14, 2026
The Cook Political Report	Solid R	February 6, 2025
Inside Elections	Solid R	May 5, 2026
Sabato's Crystal Ball	Safe R	April 10, 2025
The Economist	Safe R	May 6, 2026

==== Post-primary endorsements ====
Phil Ehr (D)

Federal officials

- William J. Perry, former United States secretary of defense (1994–1997)

U.S. representatives

- Jamie Raskin, MD-08 (2017–present)

Labor unions

- IBEW Local 349

==== Fundraising ====
Campaign finance reports as of October 14, 2026
Candidate	Raised	Spent	Cash on hand
Carlos Gimenez (R)	$722,291	$757,535	$540,783
Phil Ehr (D)	$508,311	$88,022	$506,963
Source: Federal Election Commission

==== Polling ====
Hypothetical polling

Carlos Giménez vs. Hector Mujica

Poll source	Date(s) administered	Sample size	Margin of error	Carlos Gimenez (R)	Hector Mujica (D)	Undecided
MDW Communications	March 2–7, 2026	514 (LV)	± 4.3%	46%	40%	14%

==== Results ====
2026 Florida's 28th congressional district election
Party	Candidate	Votes	%	±%
Republican	Carlos Giménez (incumbent)			
Democratic	Phil Ehr			
Independent	Eddy Rojas			
Total votes				

== Notes ==
Partisan clients
