= David Silvers =

American politician (born 1979)

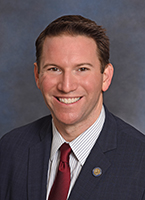

Member of the Florida House of Representatives
- In office November 8, 2016 – November 5, 2024
- Preceded by: Dave Kerner
- Succeeded by: Debra Tendrich
- Constituency: 87th district (2016–2022); 89th district (2022–2024)

Personal details
- Born: February 26, 1979 (age 47) Miami Beach, Florida, U.S.
- Party: Democratic
- Education: University of Florida; University of Miami

David Silvers (born February 26, 1979) is an American politician. He is a Democratic member of the Florida Legislature representing the state's 89th House district, which includes part of Palm Beach County.

== Early career ==
Silvers unsuccessfully challenged Bill Hager for the 89th House district seat in 2014. In the November 4, 2014 general election, Silvers finished with 47.5% of the vote to Hager's 52.5%.

== Florida House of Representatives ==
Silvers defeated two other candidates in the August 30, 2016 Democratic primary, winning 54.1% of the vote. With no Republican or third-party candidates in the race, Silvers was elected automatically.

In 2018, Silvers was challenged in the Democratic primary by Edgardo Hernandez, but Silvers prevailed with 62.7% of the vote. Silvers was reelected in the November 6, 2018 general election, winning 84.59% of the vote and defeating Green Party candidate Samson LeBeau Kpadenou.

Florida House of Representatives
Preceded by Dave Kerner	Member of the Florida House of Representatives from the 87th district 2016–2022	Succeeded by Mike Caruso
Preceded by Mike Caruso	Member of the Florida House of Representatives from the 89th district 2022–2024	Succeeded by Debra Tendrich
