= Mike Caruso (politician) =

American politician from Florida (born 1958)

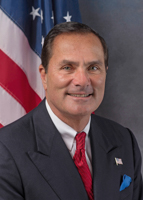
- Official portrait, 2018

Clerk of the Circuit Court and Comptroller of Palm Beach County
- Suspended as of August 18, 2026
- Assumed office August 18, 2025
- Preceded by: Joseph Abruzzo

Member of the Florida House of Representatives
- In office November 6, 2018 – August 18, 2025
- Preceded by: Bill Hager
- Succeeded by: Emily Gregory
- Constituency: 89th district (2018–2022); 87th district (2022–2025)

Personal details
- Born: Michael Allen Caruso; September 14, 1958 (age 68) Washington, D.C., U.S.
- Party: Republican
- Education: George Washington University (BBA)
- Website: Official website (Archived)

Michael Allen Caruso (born September 14, 1958) is an American politician and businessman who served as Clerk of the Circuit Court and Comptroller of Palm Beach County from August 2025 until his suspension in August 2026. A member of the Republican Party, he previously served in the Florida House of Representatives from 2018 to 2025.

On August 18, 2026, Caruso was arrested on charges related to child sexual abuse and charged with 5 felony counts including kidnapping, molestation and child abuse.

== History ==
A native of Washington, D.C., Caruso moved to Florida in 1986.

== Florida House of Representatives ==
Caruso defeated Matt Spritz in the August 28, 2018, Republican primary, winning 56.2% of the vote. In the November 6, 2018, general election, Caruso was narrowly elected with 50.02% of the vote, defeating Democrat Jim Bonfiglio. Caruso's margin of victory — just 32 votes — triggered both a machine and manual recount under Florida law.

In the 2022 Florida House of Representatives election, Caruso endorsed Katherine Waldron in the Democratic primary for an open Florida House seat. This move drew criticism from local Republicans. In response to the endorsement, the Palm Beach County Republican Executive Committee voted to censure him. In his defense, Caruso argued that his endorsement only applied to the primary election and that he felt compelled to do so because of the work they did together to help bring hurricane relief to the Bahamas. In the 2024 Florida House of Representatives election, Caruso was re-elected with 59.48% percent of the vote.

According to Florida House of Representatives, Caruso was a Cub Scout and Boy Scout Leader. In 2023, he voted in favor HB 1297, which made certain cases of capital sexual battery against children a capital offense, punishable by death. In 2023, Caruso sponsored HB 269, along with Representative Randy Fine, which criminalized antisemitic literature disseminated on private property. The bill was signed by Governor Ron DeSantis in Israel, along with Caruso and Fine.

== Palm Beach Circuit Court and Comptroller ==
On August 18, 2025, Governor Ron DeSantis appointed Caruso as clerk of the circuit court and comptroller of Palm Beach County. As Comptroller, he directed the county to invest in Israeli bonds, which reached $1 billion and was the largest investment of such in the world, despite Israeli bond downgrades. A lawsuit challenging the investment by Palestinian-Americans was dismissed. Following Caruso's arrest on child sexual abuse allegations in 2026, DeSantis suspended him from the position. DeSantis denied knowing of the allegations. Despite being suspended from his position, Caruso remained on the ballot for the November 3 election as the Republican nominee, and was defeated 62% to 38% by Democrat Yvette Drucker.

== Child sexual abuse arrest ==
On August 18, 2026, Florida Attorney General James Uthmeier announced that Caruso was arrested by the Florida Department of Law Enforcement on charges related to child sexual abuse. Caruso was formally charged with five felony counts including kidnapping, molestation and child abuse. The victim was under the age of 12 and a family member of Caruso's.

Following the arrest, Governor Ron DeSantis suspended Caruso from his position as clerk circuit court and comptroller. Prosecutors cited his past violence and gun ownership in a bid to hold him without bond. On August 28, 2026, Caruso was released from Orange County jail after posting a $160,000 bond.

According to court records, Caruso was also accused of child sexual abuse by his ex-wife in 2012.
