= Shelley Vana =

American politician (born 1951)

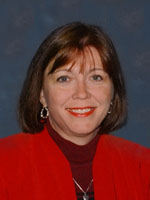

Member of the Palm Beach County Commission from the 3rd district
- In office November 18, 2008 – November 22, 2016
- Preceded by: Warren Newell
- Succeeded by: Dave Kerner

Member of the Florida House of Representatives from the 96th district
- In office November 5, 2002 – November 4, 2008
- Preceded by: Lois Frankel
- Succeeded by: Joseph Abruzzo

Personal details
- Born: December 30, 1951 (age 74) Rochester, Pennsylvania
- Party: Democratic
- Spouse: Rosti F. Vana
- Children: 2
- Education: Indiana University of Pennsylvania (B.A.)
- Profession: Teacher

Rochelle "Shelley" Vana (born December 30, 1951) is a Democratic politician who currently serves as a Palm Beach County Commissioner, representing the 3rd District from 2008 to the present. Prior to being elected to the Broward County Commission, Vana served as a member of the Florida House of Representatives from 2002 to 2008, representing the 85th District.

== Early life and education ==
Vana was born in Rochester, Pennsylvania, and attended the Indiana University of Pennsylvania, graduating with her bachelor's degree in psychology in 1973. She moved to the state of Florida and began working as an educator, teaching at the Dreyfoos School of the Arts and Jupiter Community High School. Vana then worked as a science resource coordinator for the School District of Palm Beach County, and served as the president and the chief executive officer of the Palm Beach County Classroom Teachers Association.

== Florida House of Representatives ==
In 2002, incumbent State Representative Lois Frankel was unable to seek re-election due to term limits, so Vana ran to succeed her in the 85th District, which included Lake Worth, Palm Springs, Royal Palm Beach, and Wellington in central Palm Beach County. She faced Frankel's former legislative assistant, Mark Pafford, in the Democratic primary, and she narrowly defeated him with 54% of the vote. Vana advanced to the general election, where she was opposed by Andy Edwards, the Republican nominee.

She campaigned on her support for public education, advocating for a reduction in class sizes, increased recruitment of new teachers, and the abolition of a law that allows for school districts to fire teachers without explanation after less than a hundred days of their employment. During the campaign, Edwards attacked Vana over the fact that she had a hundred thousand dollar salary from her position as the county union president, but Vana disputed it, as the advertisement significantly overstated her actual salary.

She was endorsed by the Sun-Sentinel, which praised her for having a "solid understanding of educational issues and the workings of the Legislature." Ultimately, Vana squeaked out a narrow victory over Edwards, beat him by six hundred votes and winning 51% of the vote. During her first term, Vana authored legislation requiring doctors to print or type prescriptions, which eventually passed, and legislation that would have fully funded KidCare without carving out an exemption for low-income families, which ultimately failed. Running for re-election in 2004, Vana was challenged by Edwards once again, and she pledged to continue working for mandatory pre-kindergarten for Florida students if re-elected. In the end, Vana expanded her margin of victory from two years prior, and defeated Edwards by 1,348 votes with 51% of the vote.

In 2006, running for what would be her final term in the legislature, Vana was challenged in the Democratic primary by Jeff Murphy. She was endorsed once again by the Sun-Sentinel, which argued that she was "much better informed and more qualified to represent the district than her opponent" and that her "ability to work with her Republican colleagues to get things done" warranted renomination. She ended up defeating Murphy in a landslide, winning the primary with 77% of the vote.

In the general election, she was opposed by Robert Siedlecki, and campaigned on her support for increasing teacher salaries, reforming property insurance, and reducing property taxes. She argued that voters could evaluate her record of accomplishment in the legislature, which included expanding the eligibility of KidCare, noting, "I go and pass bills you want me to pass. I have a record on which you can judge me." The Sun-Sentinel supported her campaign in the general election as well, calling her "simply an effective lawmaker who gets things done." Ultimately, despite the close races she endured in the past, she defeated Siedlecki by a wide margin, winning re-election with 58% of the vote.

== Palm Beach County Commission ==
In 2008, rather than seek re-election to the State House, Vana instead opted to run for the Palm Beach County Commission in the 3rd District, challenging incumbent Republican Commissioner Bob Kanjian, who was appointed by then-Governor Charlie Crist to the seat when the previous commissioner resigned after being sentenced on corruption charges. She faced Boynton Beach City Commissioner Carl McCoy in the Democratic primary, but dispatched him easily, winning the nomination with 80% of the vote. Advancing to the general election, she faced Kanjian. While Kanjian argued during the campaign for drastic budget cuts, Vana argued that a more careful method was needed, saying, "I'd be the person who goes in with the scalpel." She also emphasized her support for cutting crime rates, reducing the traffic congestion and urban sprawl, and allowing for more affordable housing. The Sun-Sentinel strongly criticized Kanjian, noting that his "tendency for negativity, and frankly his own ego, have prevented him from being an effective leader on the County Commission and have only added to the dysfunction that all too often disrupts this already divisive board," and endorsed Vana, whom they called "a shrewd negotiator and a proven consensus builder who comes with a strong record of accomplishments after six years as a legislator in Tallahassee." She ended up handily defeating Kanjian, winning her first term on the County Commission with 57% of the vote.

In 2010, Vana declined to endorse the Democratic nominee for the United States Senate, Congressman Kendrick Meek, instead announcing that she would be supporting Governor Charlie Crist, running as an independent candidate, because Crist had the better chance of winning as was a "middle of the road" candidate.

Running for re-election in 2012, Vana was opposed by Cliff Montross, a retired policeman and the Republican nominee. In a low-key campaign, she campaigned on protecting residents' access to emergency services and environmental protection, and was endorsed by the Sun-Sentinel, which called her a "productive member on the commission." She ended up defeating Montross in a landslide, receiving 67% of the vote to his 33%.

== Personal life ==
Shelley Vana is married to Rosti F. Vana, with whom she has two children, Jason and Jessica.
