= James Lorenzo Walker =

American politician (1920–2003)

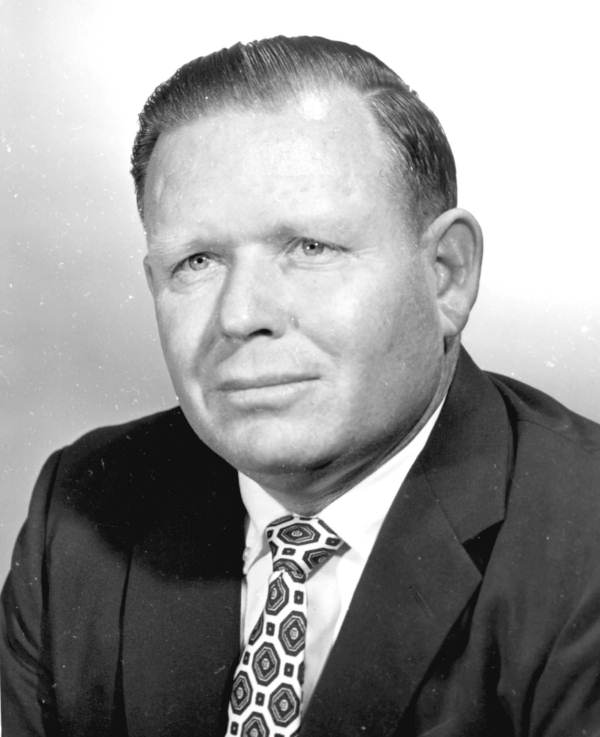
- Walker in 1974

Member of the Florida House of Representatives from the 113th district
- In office 1967 – November 7, 1972
- Preceded by: District established
- Succeeded by: John Cyril Malloy

Member of the Florida House of Representatives from the 89th district
- In office November 7, 1972 – November 1974
- Preceded by: Edward J. Trombetta
- Succeeded by: Mary Ellen Hawkins

Personal details
- Born: November 1, 1920 Marco Island, Florida, U.S.
- Died: November 16, 2003 (aged 83) Naples, Florida, U.S.
- Party: Democratic
- Spouse: Marguerite Lanier
- Children: 2

James Lorenzo Walker (November 1, 1920 – November 16, 2003) was an American politician. He served as a Democratic member for the 89th and 113th district of the Florida House of Representatives.

Walker was born in Marco Island, Florida, the son of Adnie and Forrest Walker. Walker and his family moved to Naples, Florida in 1921, and he attended Naples High School, graduating in 1939. He then served in the United States Army Air Force from 1943 to 1946 in various roles such as aircraft maintenance technician, diesel mechanic and researcher. Walker also served for the Collier County Commission from 1950 to 1956, and later worked in real estate.

In 1967 Walker became the first member for the newly established 113th district of the Florida House of Representatives. In 1972 he was elected for the 89th district of the Florida House of Representatives, serving until 1974.

Walker died in November 2003 in Naples, Florida, at the age of 83.
