= Charles J. King =

American politician

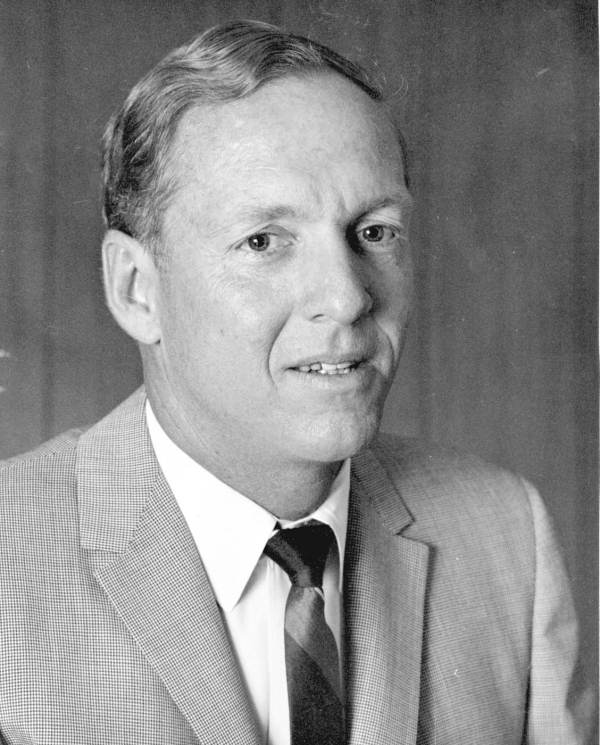

Member of the Florida House of Representatives from the 89th district
- In office March 1967 – November 3, 1970
- Preceded by: district created
- Succeeded by: Edward J. Trombetta

Personal details
- Born: Charles James Shields; February 3, 1925 Atlanta, Georgia, U.S.
- Died: February 21, 2016 (aged 91) Fort Lauderdale, Florida, U.S.
- Party: Republican
- Education: University of Miami
- Occupation: attorney

Charles James "Jim" King (February 3, 1925 – February 21, 2016) was a politician in the American state of Florida. He served in the Florida House of Representatives from 1967 to 1970, representing the 89th district.
