= Vicki Lopez =

American politician

Vicki L. Lopez
- Official state representative photo

Member of the Miami-Dade County Commission from District 5
- Incumbent
- Assumed office November 19, 2025
- Preceded by: Eileen Higgins

Member of the Florida House of Representatives from the 113th district
- In office November 8, 2022 – November 18, 2025
- Preceded by: Nick Duran
- Succeeded by: Gloria Romero Roses

Lee County Board of Commissioners
- In office November 1990 – January 1993

Personal details
- Born: Tampa, Florida
- Party: Republican
- Children: Donald Fanning Wolfe III
- Education: University of Notre Dame

Vicki L. Lopez is an American politician. A member of the Republican Party, she is a member of the Miami-Dade County Commission District 5 and formerly represented the 113th District in the Florida House of Representatives.

== Early life ==
Lopez was born in Tampa, Florida at the Centro Asturiano Hospital and raised in Fort Myers, Florida. Lopez is of Spanish descent, specifically Asturian on both sides of her family. She attended the University of Notre Dame. She is a longtime activist who today runs Miami-based VLL Consulting LLC.

== Early political and government career ==
In November 1990, Lopez was elected to the Board of County Commissioners of Lee County, Florida. She resigned in January 1993.

In 1997, Lopez was convicted for honest services mail fraud and sentenced to 27 months in federal prison. Her sentence was commuted by President Bill Clinton in November 2000, after serving more than 15 months. The conviction was vacated by the U.S. District Court for the Middle District of Florida in February 2011. Lopez’s experience led to a lifetime of activism in criminal justice reform, assisting others who have faced wrongful convictions and working for better public policy. She has worked on programs to assist inmates in reentering society and managing the negative stigmatism often associated with a criminal conviction, whether warranted or falsely accused.

After her release, Lopez worked as an advocate under Governor Jeb Bush, specializing in criminal justice reform. She was appointed by the Governor as the Chairman of the Governor's Ex-Offender Task Force. She also took up leadership roles with the Greater Miami Chamber of Commerce. She worked under three Governors, specializing in education, criminal and juvenile justice.

== Florida House of Representatives (2022–2025) ==
In August 2022, Lopez returned to elected office, defeating Alberto Perosch in the Republican primary election for the 113th district of the Florida House of Representatives. In November 2022, she defeated Alessandro D'Amico in the general election, winning 51 percent of the votes.

As a state representative, Lopez sponsored and passed several bills on behalf of the constituents of District 113. In the aftermath of the Surfside condominium collapse in 2021, residents of Miami-Dade County expressed great concerns over condominium safety. In addition, Lopez introduced and passed House Bill 1029, the My Safe Florida Condominium Pilot Program, which went into law on July 1, 2024 and allowed inspections and grants in order to harden condominium buildings. Lopez also introduced a proposal for a state freeze of property of taxes for residences in Miami under the county's median value of $575,000.

Lopez was re-elected in 2024 by 55 percent of the votes. During her second term, Lopez was positioned as a "top lieutenant" to House Speaker Daniel Perez. She served as chairwoman of the State Administration Budget Subcommittee, where she headed its probe into spending by state agencies during the governorship of Ron DeSantis. She also chaired the House Select Committee on Property Taxes.

== Miami-Dade County Commission (2025–present) ==
On November 18, 2025, Lopez was appointed to the District 5 seat on the Miami-Dade County Commission, with the commissioners voting 7–5 to appoint her. She agreed to vacate her seat in the state legislature in order to assume the new office.

== Personal life ==
Lopez married Sylvester Lukis in 1994 and divorced him in 2015.

Lopez's son, Donald Wolfe III, was the Senior Advisor to Miami City Manager, Art Noreiga and Chief of Staff for Miami City Mayor Francis Suarez.

Lopez owns and runs VLL Consulting LLC, a Florida-based government and public affairs firm.
