= Florida's 87th House of Representatives district =

Florida district

Florida's 87th State House of Representatives district
Representative
Jon Maples; R

Florida's 87th House of Representatives district elects one member of the Florida House of Representatives. It contains parts of Palm Beach County.

== Members ==
- Bill Andrews (until 2002)
- Adam Hasner (2002–2010)
- Bill Hager (2010–2012)
- Dave Kerner (2012–2016)
- David Silvers (2016–2022)
- Mike Caruso (2022–2025)
- Emily Gregory (2026–2026)
- Jon Maples (2026–present)
