= Clerk of the Circuit Court (Florida) =

Florida state court clerk and county clerk

The Clerk of the Circuit Court is a Florida constitutional officer and countywide elected official. In most Florida counties, the clerk also serves as ex officio county comptroller, county treasurer, county auditor, county recorder, and clerk to the Board of County Commissioners.

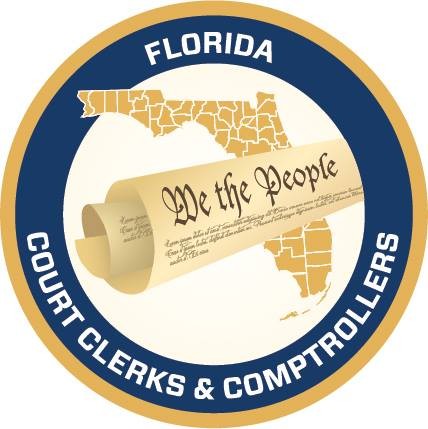
Seal of the Florida Court Clerks & Comptrollers organization

The Clerk is a state and county official, serving both the state circuit court and the county court. The Clerk's Office, headed by the Clerk of the Circuit Court, provides access to state and county resources as well as oversees public access to justice within the county. The Clerk performs a wide range of functions, including record keeping, information management, and financial administration services for the Florida State Courts System and the county government. Clerks establish the budgets for their offices with revenue stemming from court-related fees, fines, and service charges of taxpayers. The Clerk is elected every four years, coinciding with presidential elections, by the voters of the county in partisan elections. In the event of the death, resignation, or removal from office of a clerk of the circuit court, the governor of Florida is empowered to fill the vacancy until the next regularly scheduled election.

== Duties and responsibilities ==
Florida clerks have over 1,000 statutory duties and responsibilities. The duties, as enumerated in the Florida Statutes, include:

- Facilitate the jury process, including the random selection of juror pools, summoning jurors, managing juror exemptions, and compensating jurors.
- Maintain and manage access to all court records
- Provide resources for individuals and attorneys filing legal actions
- Maintain court finances, including collecting and disbursing fines, court costs, forfeitures, fees, and service charges. The Clerk also records payments, tracks financial obligations to the courts, and ensures court compliance.
- Manage court appearances, including coordinating, scheduling, attending, and keeping records of court hearings and trials.
- Process all civil and criminal cases and file indictments, information, and verdicts
- Process domestic violence injunctions and vulnerable adult injunctions
- Provide online and in-person resources for individuals representing themselves in court
- Provide walk-in services to all county residents
- Maintain accurate child support payment records
- Audit annual reports on individuals under guardianship
- Redacting or expunging sensitive legal information
- Process petitions for Baker Act and Marchman Act cases
- Arbitrate red flag law orders
- Maintaining, preserving, storing, and managing access to all evidence entered into the court

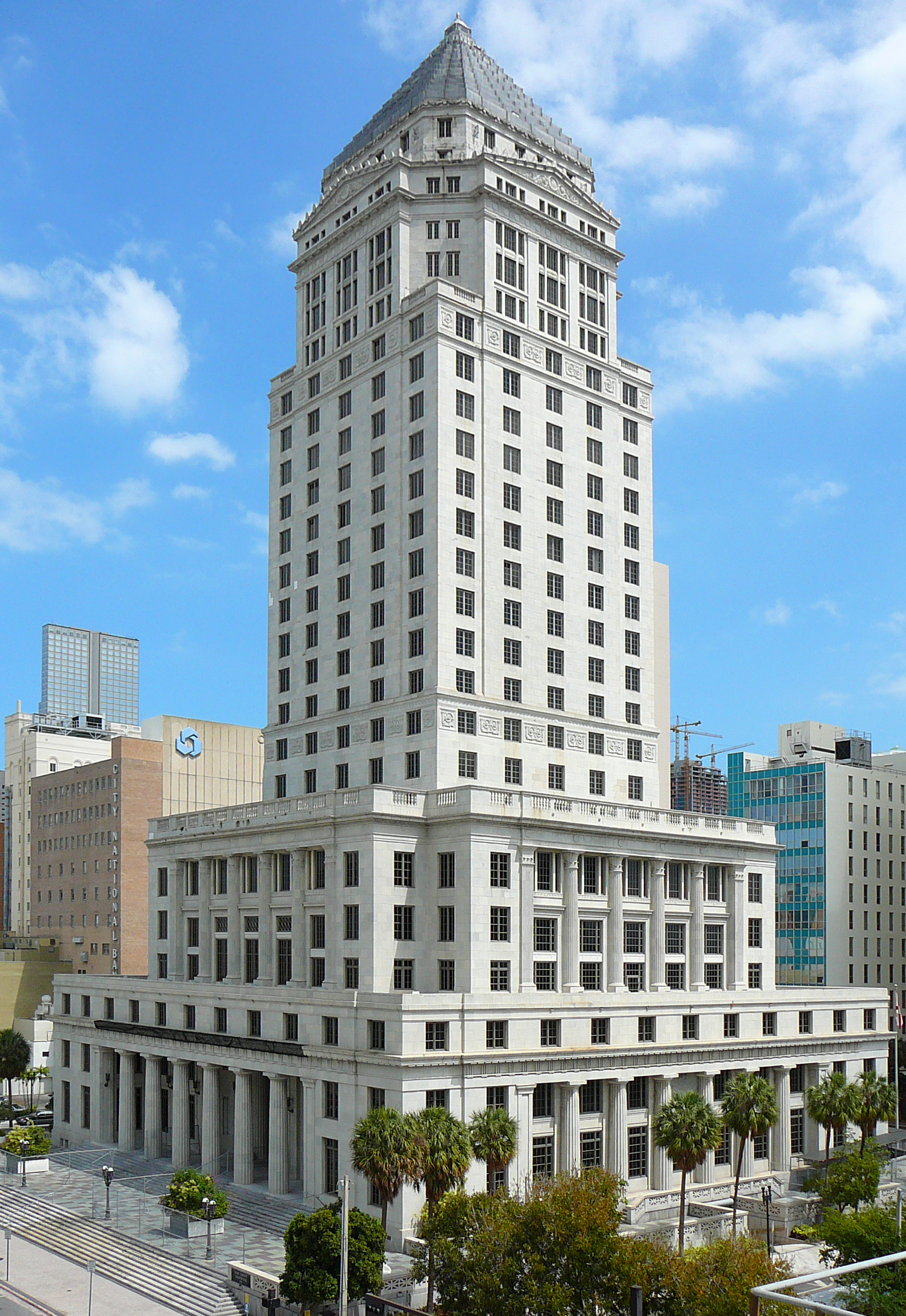
Miami-Dade County Courthouse; seat of the Miami-Dade County clerk

=== As county comptroller & treasurer ===
Duties of Florida county comptrollers & treasurers:

- Audit the county budget
- Manage payroll for county employees and process accounts payable
- Audit all county expenses and activities
- Review all county contracts
- Oversee and maintain all county assets, including county property, land, vehicles, and capital assets
- Conduct public auctions
- Manage all county investments
- Maintain and prepare financial reports

=== As county recorder ===
Duties of Florida county recorders:

- Maintain and record all county property deeds and documents
- Issue and maintain marriage licenses
- Maintain county government, county court, and historical documents
- Process United States passport applications

=== As clerk to the county commission ===
Duties of Florida clerk to the county commission:

- Attend all meetings of the board of county commissioners and count commission committees
- Produce, maintain, and distribute office minutes of county commission meetings
- Maintain legal custody of the official county seal
- Maintain custody of all county resolutions, ordinances, and contracts

== List of Florida clerks of the circuit court ==
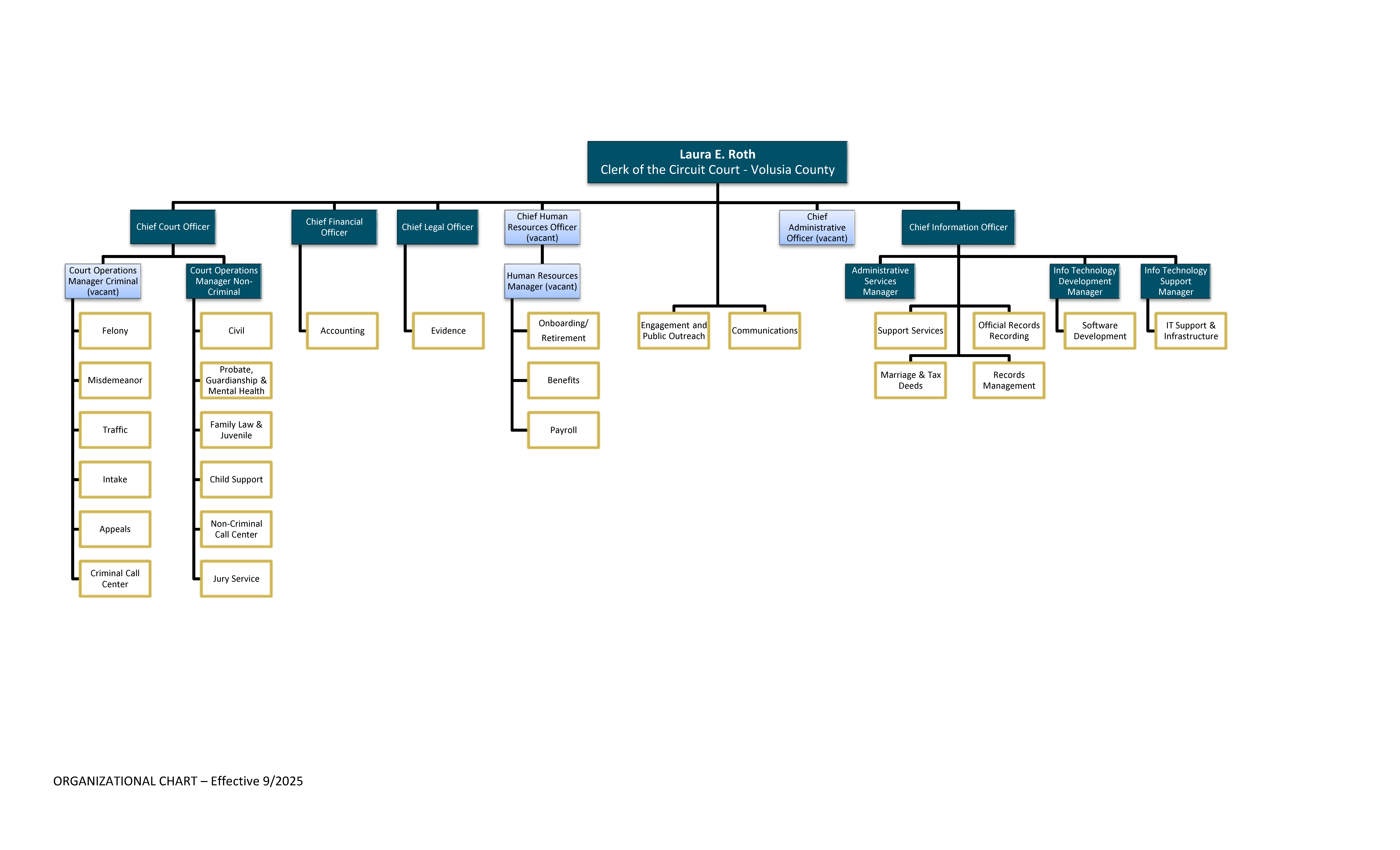
Volusia County Clerk's Office organizational chart in 2025

The following is a partial list of incumbent (bolded) and former Florida clerks of the circuit court.

Current and former clerks
Name	County
Joseph Abruzzo	Palm Beach County
**Mike Caruso**	Palm Beach County
John Quincy Dickinson	Jackson County
**Juan Fernandez-Barquin**	Miami-Dade County
Henry L. Mitchell	Hillsborough County

== See also ==
- County sheriff (Florida)
- Supervisor of elections
- Government of Florida
- Elections in Florida
