= Adam Hasner =

American attorney and politician

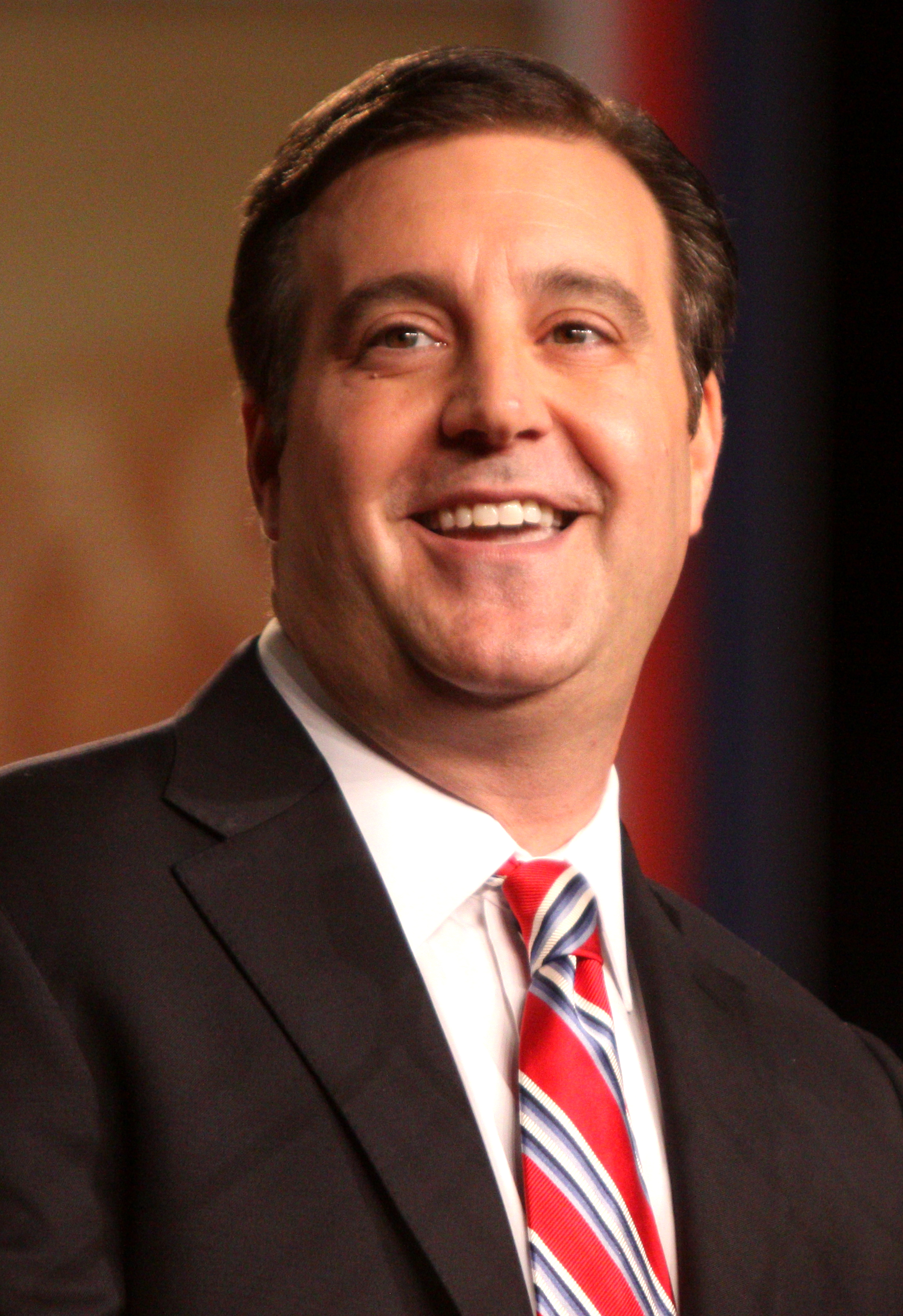

8th President of Florida Atlantic University
- Incumbent
- Assumed office March 10, 2025
- Preceded by: Stacy Volnick

Majority Leader of the Florida House of Representatives
- In office June 12, 2007 – November 16, 2010
- Preceded by: Marty Bowen
- Succeeded by: Carlos Lopez-Cantera

Member of the Florida House of Representatives from the 87th district
- In office November 5, 2002 – November 2, 2010
- Preceded by: Bill Andrews
- Succeeded by: Bill Hager

Personal details
- Born: Adam Michael Hasner; November 25, 1969 (age 56) Brooklyn, New York, U.S.
- Spouse: Jillian Hasner
- Education: University of Maryland (BA); Florida State University (JD)
- Profession: Attorney

Adam Michael Hasner (born November 25, 1969) is an American attorney and politician who is the eighth and current president of Florida Atlantic University. Hasner served as a member of the Florida House of Representatives from 2002 to 2010. In 2012, he was the Republican nominee for Florida's 22nd congressional district.

== Early life and education ==
Hasner was born in the Brooklyn borough of New York City. He earned a bachelor's degree from the University of Maryland in 1991, where he was a member of Phi Delta Theta. He received his Juris Doctor from Florida State University in 1995.

== Political career ==
In 2007, Hasner was selected to serve as the Deputy Majority Leader of the Florida House of Representatives by then-Speaker Marco Rubio, who promoted him to Majority Leader later that year. He was the first legislator from Palm Beach County to hold the position in more than 50 years, and the first Jewish Republican Majority Leader.

During his eight years in office, Hasner was regarded as one of the most conservative legislators in the Florida House. This led to criticism from Florida Democrats, who attacked Hasner for among other things voting against additional stimulus spending in Florida. Hasner was videotaped describing himself as "the most partisan Republican in Tallahassee."

Since 2007, Hasner profiled himself as a campaigner against radical Islam and Sharia. Along with activist Tom Trento, he held a screening of the film Obsession, while forming the group Florida Security Council, which later became the United West. They also invited Frank Gaffney to hold a speech. He later warned against Parvez Ahmed, a finance professor at the University of North Florida being appointed to a Human rights Commission, against the Muslim Day at the Florida capitol, and boycotted an appearance by Tampa Imam Qasim Ahmed, who delivered the opening prayer in the House chamber. He invited Geert Wilders to hold a speech while screening his film Fitna, and spoke alongside Pamela Geller. He has been described as a part of the counter-jihad movement.

In 2010, Hasner led the House Republican effort demanding the United States Congress pass a balanced budget amendment to the U.S. Constitution. Hasner is national Co-Chairman of the citizen action group, Pass The Balanced Budget Amendment.

=== 2012 U.S. Senate bid and congressional election ===
On March 14, 2011, The Washington Post reported that Republican lawyer and conservative activist Cleta Mitchell filed the necessary paperwork on behalf of Hasner to officially begin exploring the Republican primary for the United States Senate in Florida. On April 25, 2011, Hasner officially announced he was running for Senate on Mark Levin's radio show. On September 23, Hasner won the CPAC-FL straw poll, with 34% of the vote, compared to 30% for Mike McCalister and 24% for George LeMieux.

Hasner announced on February 1, 2012, that he would end his campaign for U.S. Senate in Florida and instead run for United States House of Representatives in Florida's 22nd Congressional District, which includes many of the coastal communities of Broward and Palm Beach Counties that he represented in the Florida House of Representatives. Hasner was endorsed by U.S. Senator Marco Rubio, former Florida governor Jeb Bush, House Majority Leader Eric Cantor and Congressman Allen West.

Hasner lost the general election to former West Palm Beach mayor Lois Frankel. Frankel defeated Hasner by a margin of 55% to 45%.

=== Florida Atlantic University ===
In February 2025, Hasner was appointed to be president of Florida Atlantic University. He was hired one week after the trustees approved increasing the presidential salary to between $1 million and $1.5 million. The board trustees unanimously chose Hasner over two experienced university administrators. Hasner's appointment was supported by influential Republican politicians. On March 10, 2025, he assumed the role of president.

In his first 100 days as president, Hasner secured a $1 million gift to establish a Washington D.C. internship program that supports opportunities for Florida Atlantic University students to intern with the U.S. Congress, the U.S. State Department, and other government and public agencies.

Florida House of Representatives
Preceded by Bill Andrews	Member of the Florida House of Representatives from the 87th district 2002–2010	Succeeded by Bill Hager
Preceded by Marty Bowen	Majority Leader of the Florida House of Representatives; 2007–2010	Succeeded by Carlos Lopez-Cantera
Academic offices
Preceded by Stacy Volnick	President of Florida Atlantic University; 2025–present	Incumbent
