= John Cyril Malloy =

American politician (1930–2014)

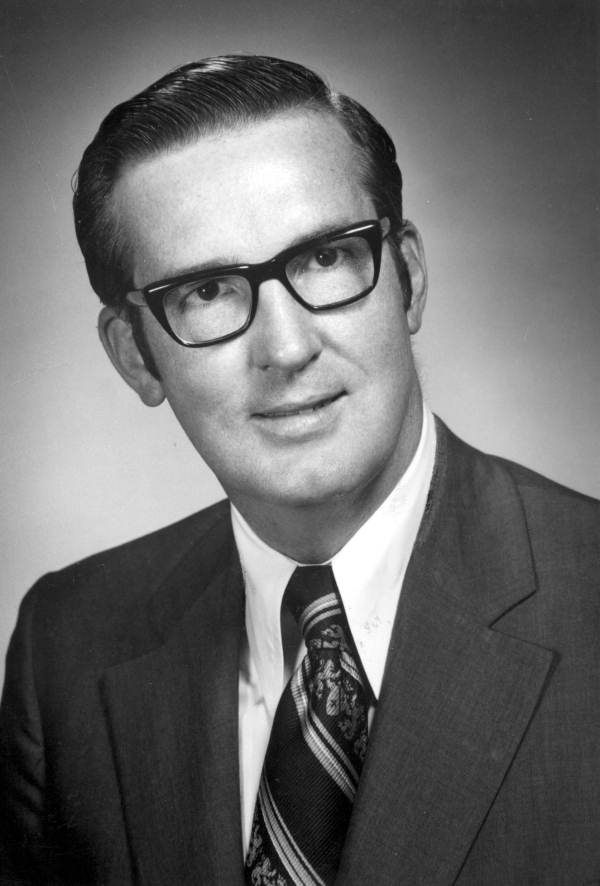
- Malloy in 1972

Member of the Florida House of Representatives from the 113th district
- In office November 7, 1972 – November 5, 1974
- Preceded by: James Lorenzo Walker
- Succeeded by: Nancy Harrington

Member of the Florida House of Representatives from the 118th district
- In office 1976–1980
- Preceded by: Dick Clark
- Succeeded by: Charlie Hall

Personal details
- Born: June 1930 Jackson, Tennessee, U.S.
- Died: March 2, 2014 (aged 83) Coral Gables, Florida, U.S.
- Party: Republican; Democratic
- Children: 6
- Education: Northwestern University

John Cyril Malloy (June 1930 – March 2, 2014) was an American politician. He served as a member for the 113th and 118th districts of the Florida House of Representatives.

Malloy was born in Jackson, Tennessee. He moved to Chicago, Illinois and attended Northwestern University, earning a law degree in 1957. He then moved to Miami, Florida in 1959 to work as a patent attorney, establishing his own law firm. He was president of the South Florida chapter of the Federal Bar Association, and an adjunct professor at the University of Miami School of Law, teaching intellectual property law.

In 1972 Malloy was elected as a Republican member for the 113th district of the Florida House of Representatives, beating future United States Attorney General Janet Reno. In 1976 he was elected for the 118th district, becoming a Democratic member in 1977. He served until 1980.

Malloy died in March 2014 in Coral Gables, Florida, at the age of 83.
