= Emily Gregory (politician) =

American politician (born 1985)

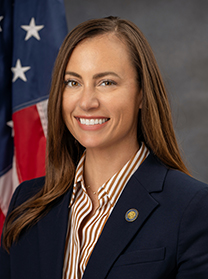
- Official portrait, 2026

Member of the Florida House of Representatives from the 87th district
- In office March 24, 2026 – November 3, 2026
- Preceded by: Mike Caruso
- Succeeded by: Jon Maples

Personal details
- Born: May 11, 1985 (age 41)
- Party: Democratic
- Spouse: Andrew Gregory
- Children: 3
- Education: Wake Forest University (BS); Columbia University (MPH)
- Website: Campaign website

Emily Gregory (born May 11, 1985) is an American Democratic politician who was a member of the Florida House of Representatives representing the 87th district. She won a 2026 special election which was notable as her district is home to Mar-a-Lago, Republican President Donald Trump's personal residence and voted for Trump in the 2024 United States presidential election by 11 points.

== Education ==
Gregory has a Bachelor of Science in health and exercise science from Wake Forest University and a Master of Public Health in health policy and management from Columbia University.

== Florida House of Representatives ==
Gregory defeated Republican Jon Maples, who was endorsed by President Donald Trump, who carried the district by 19 points in the 2024 presidential election. Her first-ever political campaign, Gregory won the special election with a 2.4 point margin after the seat was vacated by Republican Mike Caruso after he became the Palm Beach County clerk and comptroller. Much of her campaign centered on the cost-of-living crisis and family issues.

In October 2025, Gregory and the ACLU sued Republican Governor Ron DeSantis alleging violation of Florida law for failing to call a special election to fill the seat. The seat had been vacated by Caruso on August 18, 2025, resulting in the 87th district not having representation in the Florida House of Representatives for over seven months including during its 2026 regular session.

She was sworn into office on April 7, 2026, at the Palm Beach Gardens City Hall. She was unseated by Jon Maples in a rematch at the 2026 election.

== Personal life ==
Gregory is a Catholic. Gregory's husband, Andrew Gregory, is a lieutenant colonel in the United States Army. They have three children. Gregory previously owned a small business, running a fitness community for pregnant and postpartum women.

== Electoral history ==
=== 2026 ===
2026 Florida's 87th House of Representatives district general election
Party	Candidate	Votes	%
Democratic	Emily Gregory	17,113	51.19
Republican	Jon Maples	16,316	48.81
Total votes		33,429	100.00
Democratic gain from Republican			
