= Carlos Lopez-Cantera =

American politician (born 1973)

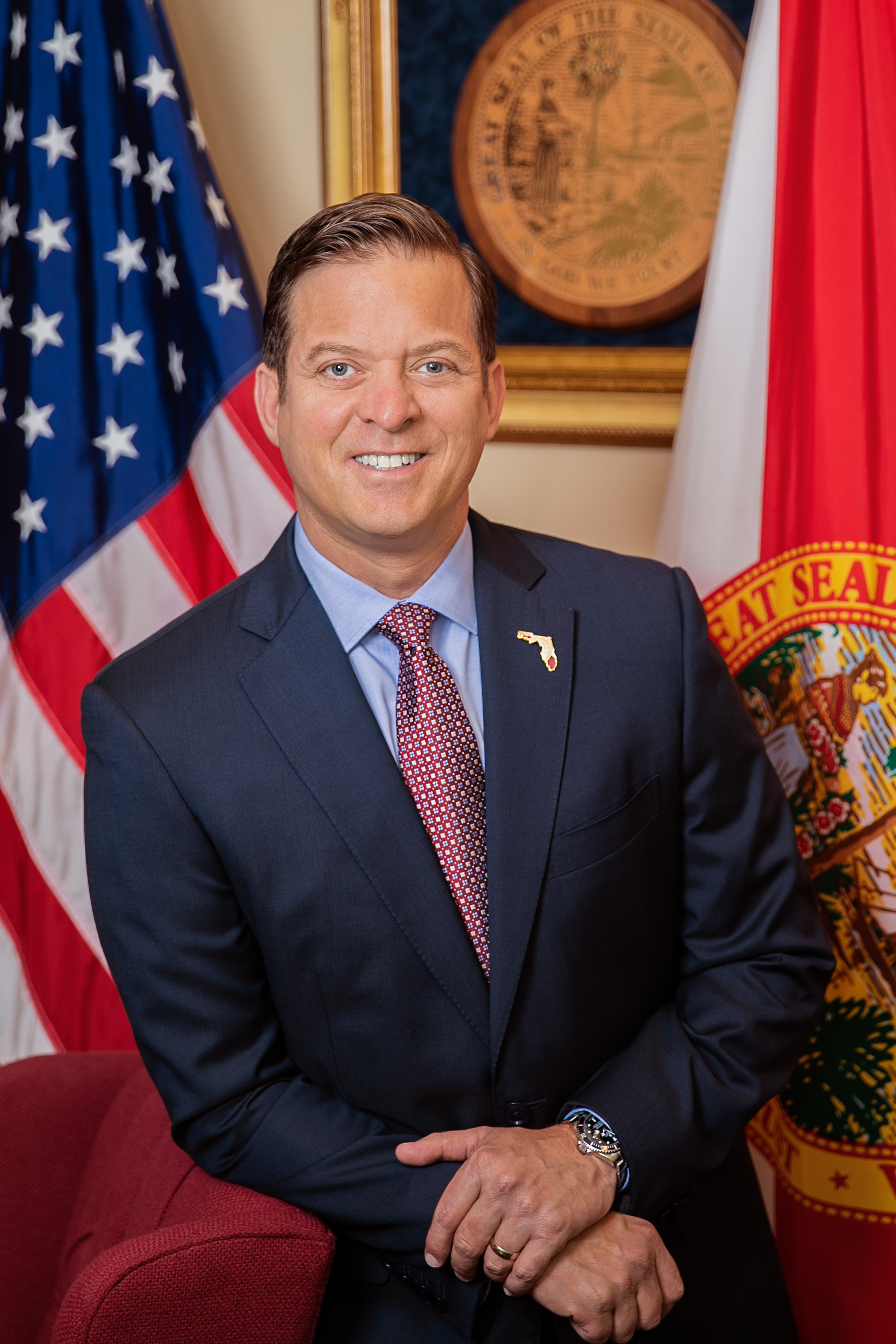

19th Lieutenant Governor of Florida
- In office February 3, 2014 – January 7, 2019
- Governor: Rick Scott
- Preceded by: Jennifer Carroll
- Succeeded by: Jeanette Nuñez

Property Appraiser of Miami-Dade County
- In office January 1, 2013 – February 3, 2014
- Preceded by: Pedro Garcia
- Succeeded by: Pedro Garcia

Majority Leader of the Florida House of Representatives
- In office November 16, 2010 – November 20, 2012
- Preceded by: Adam Hasner
- Succeeded by: Steve Precourt

Member of the Florida House of Representatives from the 113th district
- In office November 2, 2004 – November 7, 2012
- Preceded by: Manuel Prieguez
- Succeeded by: David Richardson

Personal details
- Born: December 29, 1973 (age 52) Madrid, Spain
- Party: Republican
- Spouse: Renee (m. 2005)
- Children: 2
- Education: Miami Dade College (AA); University of Miami (BBA)

Carlos Lopez-Cantera (born December 29, 1973) is an American politician who served as the 19th lieutenant governor of Florida from 2014 to 2019.

A member of the Republican Party, Lopez-Cantera represented the 113th district in the Florida House of Representatives from 2004 to 2012; he served as Majority Leader during the final two years of his term. Lopez-Cantera was elected property appraiser of Miami-Dade County on August 14, 2012. On January 14, 2014, Gov. Rick Scott appointed Lopez-Cantera to the post of Lieutenant Governor of Florida. He served out the remainder of the unexpired term of Jennifer Carroll and was elected to a full term in November 2014.

== Early life and education ==
Lopez-Cantera was born in Madrid, Spain, the son of Cuban Carlos Lopez-Cantera and Esther "Shelly" Smith Fano. His father is Catholic and his mother is Jewish. He was born two months prematurely and returned with his parents to reside in Miami, Florida, once he was healthy enough to travel. He earned an Associate of Arts degree from Miami-Dade Community College in 1994 and a Bachelor of Business Administration with a minor in political science from the University of Miami in 1996.

== Political career ==
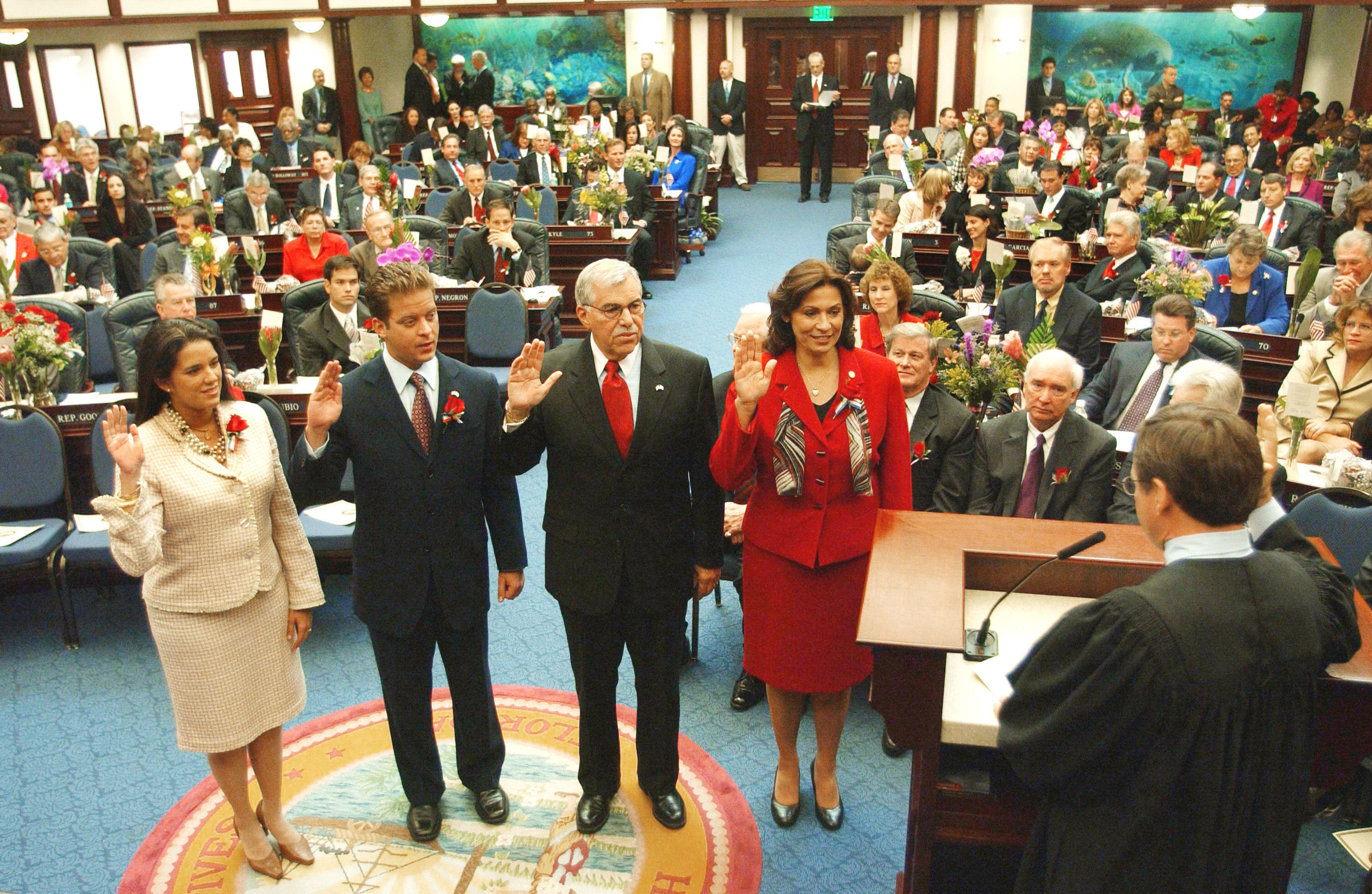
Lopez-Cantera being sworn in as a member of the Florida House of Representatives in 2004

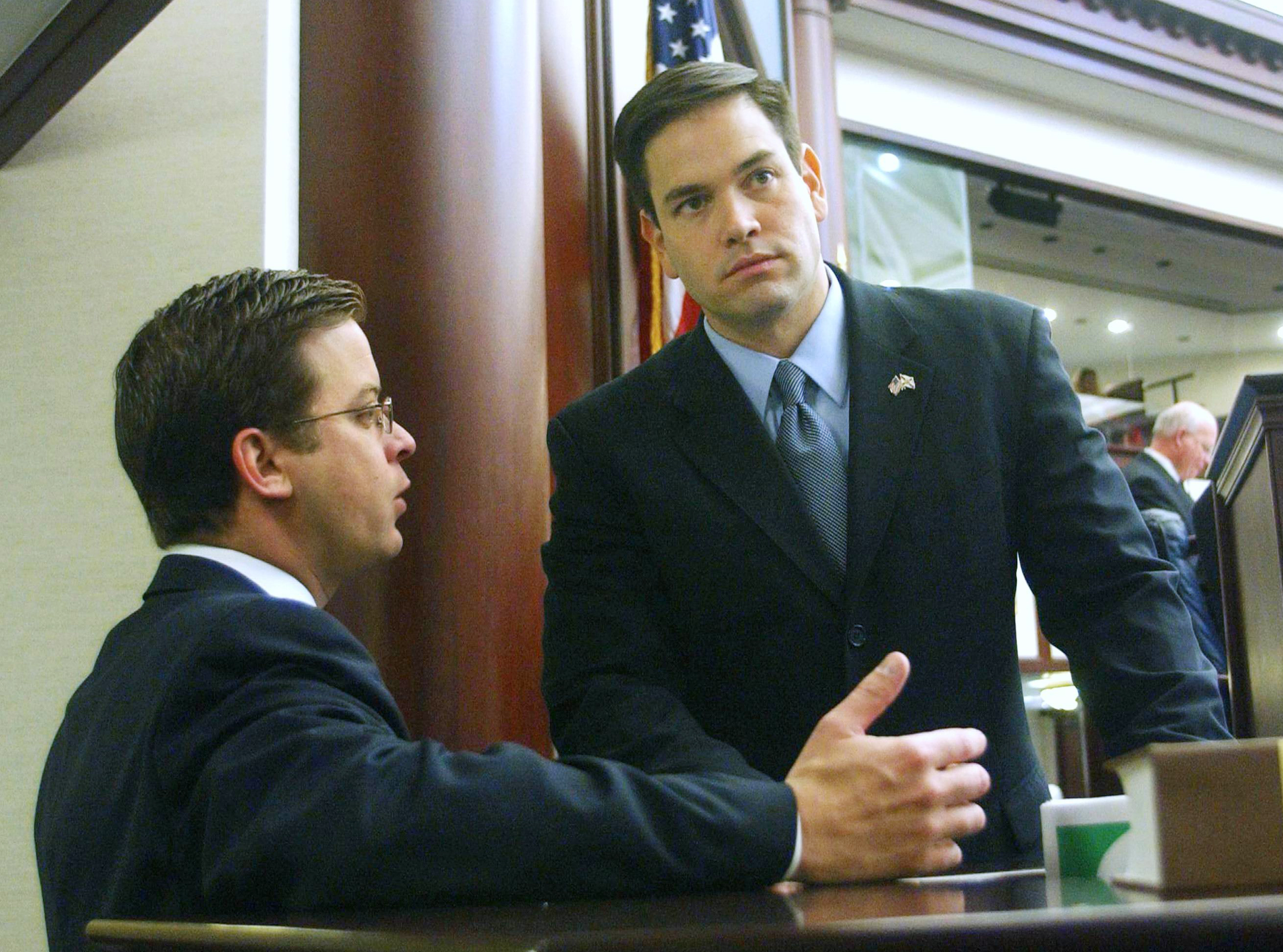
Lopez-Cantera and Marco Rubio in 2007

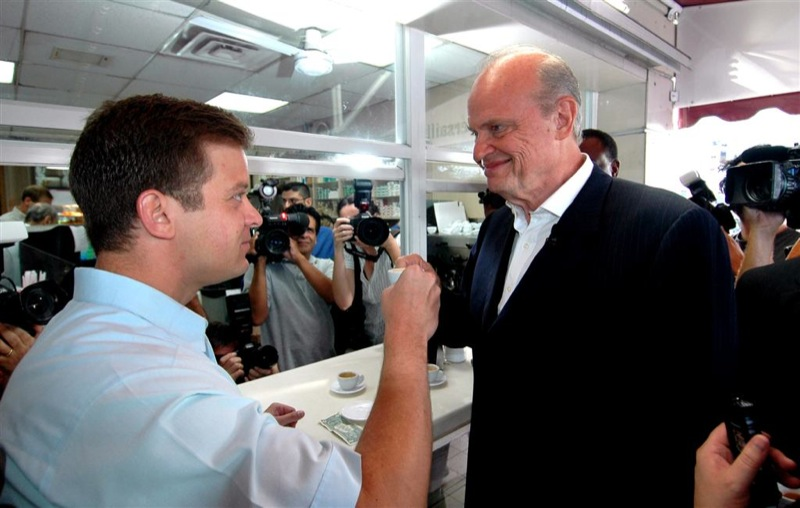
Lopez-Cantera with Fred Thompson in 2007

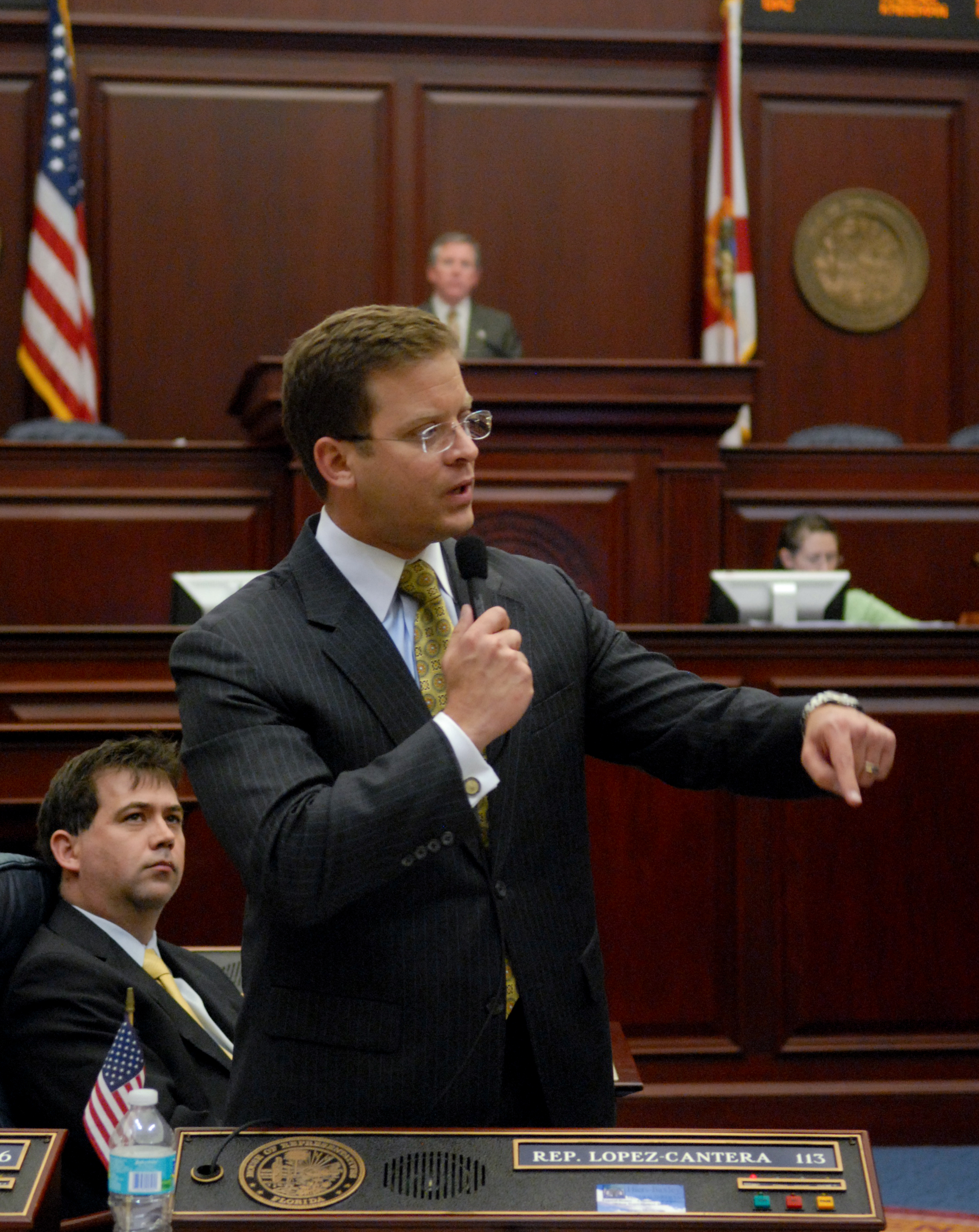
Lopez-Cantera in 2011

Florida House of Representatives

In 1997, Lopez-Cantera was a facilitator for the Florida Senate's criminal justice committee. In 2002, he made an unsuccessful bid for a seat in the Florida House of Representatives. Two years later, Lopez-Cantera won his first election to the Florida House of Representatives to the 113th District in November 2004, and was successively reelected in 2006, 2008 and in 2010 when he defeated US Navy veteran and rising democratic party star Alex Cruzet. He was House majority whip from 2008 to 2010 and the House Majority Leader from 2010 to 2012.

Lopez-Cantera was twice elected by his colleagues from Miami-Dade County to be the chairman of the Miami-Dade Legislative Delegation from 2011-2012. On August 14, 2012, he became the second property appraiser to be elected by the citizens of Miami-Dade, a county with a population of more than 2.5 million people and almost 1,000,000 properties.

=== Lieutenant Governor of Florida ===
Governor Rick Scott announced Lopez-Cantera's appointment as Lieutenant Governor of Florida on January 14, 2014. Lopez-Cantera was appointed to serve the remainder of the unexpired term of Lieutenant Gov. Jennifer Carroll, who had resigned the post on March 12, 2013. In November 2014, as Scott's running mate, Lopez-Cantera was elected to a full term as lieutenant governor. He served in that role until 2019.

On July 15, 2015, Lopez-Cantera announced his 2016 candidacy for United States Senate to replace retiring Senator Marco Rubio, who was running for president of the United States. However, Lopez-Cantera withdrew from the race following Rubio's June 22, 2016 announcement that he would seek reelection to the Senate. Lopez-Cantera declined to run for Governor of Florida in the 2018 election, instead supporting Adam Putnam in the Republican primary.

== Post-political career ==
After leaving office, Lopez-Cantera went into the private sector, and became the leader of Jax Industrial Three Ltd, a Coral Gables, Florida-based group. In 2024, the organization filed for a permit in north Jacksonville for a project estimated at $8.86 million to complete.

== Personal life ==
Lopez-Cantara's mother is Jewish while his father is Catholic. Lopez-Cantara — whose wife (since 2005), Renee, is also Jewish, as are his two daughters — celebrated his bar mitzvah in 2016 at the Western Wall.

== Electoral history ==
Florida State House of Representatives District 117 Republican Primary Election, 2002
Party	Candidate	Votes	%
Republican	Julio Robaina	6,375	53.08
Republican	Carlos Lopez-Cantera	5,634	46.92

Florida State House of Representatives District 113 Republican Primary Election, 2004
Party	Candidate	Votes	%
Republican	Carlos Lopez-Cantera	7,307	84.5
Republican	Eileen Damaso	1,345	15.5

Florida State House of Representatives District 113 Election, 2004
Party	Candidate	Votes	%
Republican	Carlos Lopez-Cantera	24,358	100.0

Florida State House of Representatives District 113 Election, 2006
Party	Candidate	Votes	%
Republican	Carlos Lopez-Cantera (inc.)	13,076	100.0
Write-in	Nicole Abrante	2	0.0

Florida State House of Representatives District 113 Election, 2008
Party	Candidate	Votes	%
Republican	Carlos Lopez-Cantera (inc.)	20,726	58.2
Democratic	Javier Betancourt	14,868	41.8

Florida State House of Representatives District 113 Election, 2010
Party	Candidate	Votes	%
Republican	Carlos Lopez-Cantera (inc.)	14,284	62.9
Democratic	Alex Cruzet	7,905	34.8
Independent	Waldo Faura	517	2.3

== See also ==
- List of minority governors and lieutenant governors in the United States

Florida House of Representatives
Preceded by Manny Prieguez	Member of the Florida House of Representatives from the 113th district 2004–2012	Succeeded by David Richardson
Political offices
Preceded by Pedro Garcia	Property Appraiser of Miami-Dade County; 2013–2014	Succeeded by Pedro Garcia
Preceded by Jennifer Carroll	Lieutenant Governor of Florida; 2014–2019	Succeeded by Jeanette Nuñez
Party political offices
Preceded by Jennifer Carroll	Republican nominee for Lieutenant Governor of Florida; 2014	Succeeded by Jeanette Nuñez
