= Debra Tendrich =

American politician

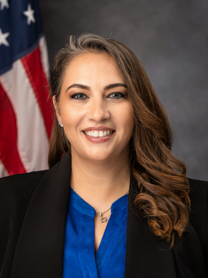

Member of the Florida House of Representatives from the 89th district
- Incumbent
- Assumed office November 5, 2024
- Preceded by: David Silvers

Personal details
- Born: August 8 California, U.S.
- Party: Democratic
- Children: 1

Debra Tendrich (born August 8) is an American politician serving as a Democratic member of the Florida House of Representatives for the 89th district. She moved to Florida in 2012, and lives in Lake Worth, Florida. She is Jewish. Tendrich founded the non-profit organization Eat Better Live Better in 2016. She received the President Joseph R. Biden Jr. Lifetime Achievement Award in 2023.
