= Bill Sadowski =

American politician

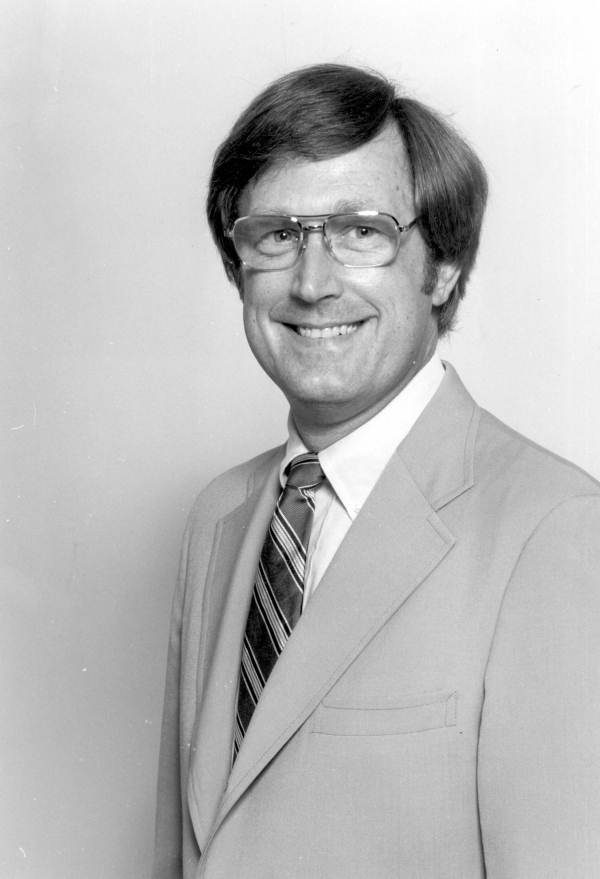
- Sadowski in 1980

Member of the Florida House of Representatives from the 113th district
- In office November 2, 1976 – November 2, 1982
- Preceded by: Nancy Harrington
- Succeeded by: Humberto Cortina

Personal details
- Died: April 9, 1992 (aged 48) St. Augustine, Florida, U.S.
- Party: Democratic
- Spouse: Jean Sadowski
- Children: 2

William E. Sadowski (died April 9, 1992) was an American politician. He served as a Democratic member of the Florida House of Representatives. He represented the 113th district.

In 1976, Sadowski won the election for the 113th district. He succeeded Nancy Harrington. In 1982, Sadowski was succeeded by Humberto Cortina. He returned to politics again in 1991 with the support of one of his friends Governor Lawton Chiles, who tapped him to head the Department of Community Affairs (DCA) in the midst of statewide contention over recently passed growth management laws.

Sadowski died in April 1992 in a plane crash in St. Augustine, Florida. He died along with his pilot, Billy Martin, when Martin died from a heart attack while piloting.
