= Florida's 89th House of Representatives district =

American legislative district

Florida's 89th State House of Representatives district
Representative
Debra Tendrich; D
- Registration: 61.8% Democratic; 36.8% Republican; 1.4% No party preference
- Demographics: 25.7% White; 18.1% Black; 54.0% Hispanic; 2.8% Asian; 3.4% Native American; 0.2% Hawaiian/Pacific Islander
- Population (2020) • Voting age: 177,515; 18

Florida's 89th House district elects one member of the Florida House of Representatives. The district is represented by Debra Tendrich. This district is located on the southeast coast of Florida.

The district covers a portion of Palm Beach County.

As of the 2020 census, the district's population is 177,515.

== Representatives ==
Representatives	Party	Years of service	Hometown	Notes
Charles J. King	Republican	1967 – November 3, 1970		district created
Edward J. Trombetta	Democratic	November 3, 1970 – November 7, 1972		
James Lorenzo Walker	Democratic	November 7, 1972 – November 1974		
Mary Ellen Hawkins	Republican	November 5, 1974 – November 2, 1982		
Joseph H. Titone	Democratic	November 2, 1982 – November 8, 1988		
Benjamin Graber	Democratic	November 8, 1988 – November 3, 1992		
Ron Klein	Democratic	November 3, 1992 – November 5, 1996		
Barry Silver	Democratic	November 5, 1996 – November 3, 1998	Boca Raton	
Curt Levine	Democratic	November 3, 1998 – November 7, 2000		
Irving Slosberg	Democratic	November 7, 2000 – November 5, 2002	Boca Raton	
Mary Brandenburg	Democratic	November 5, 2002 – November 2, 2010		
Jeff Clemens	Democratic	November 2, 2010 – November 6, 2012	Lake Worth	
Bill Hager	Republican	November 6, 2012 – November 6, 2018		
Mike Caruso	Republican	November 6, 2018 – November 9, 2022	Delray Beach	Redistricted to the 87th district
David Silvers	Democratic	November 9, 2022 – November 5, 2024	Lake Clarke Shores	
Debra Tendrich	Democratic	November 5, 2024 – present		
