= Florida's 113th House of Representatives district =

American legislative district

Florida's 113th State House of Representatives district
Representative
Gloria Romero Roses; D–Miami
- Registration: 57.9% Democratic; 40.7% Republican; 1.5% No party preference
- Demographics: 20.6% White; 4.6% Black; 72.0% Hispanic; 2.6% Asian; 1.2% Native American; 0.1% Hawaiian/Pacific Islander
- Population (2020) • Voting age: 182,742; 18

Florida's 113th House district elects one member of the Florida House of Representatives. The district is currently represented by Democrat Gloria Romero Roses. It was previously represented by Republican Vicki Lopez until her resignation in November 2025. This district covers parts of Southern Miami, including Key Biscayne, Dodge Island, and Little Havana.

== Members ==
Representative	Party	Years of service	Hometown	Notes
James Lorenzo Walker	Democratic	1967 - November 7, 1972		
John Cyril Malloy	Republican	November 7, 1972 - November 5, 1974		Changed his party to Democrat in 1977
Nancy Harrington	Democratic	November 5, 1974 - November 2, 1976		
Bill Sadowski	Democratic	November 2, 1976 - November 2, 1982		
Humberto Cortina	Republican	November 2, 1982 - November 6, 1984		
Luis Morse	Republican	November 6, 1984 - November 3, 1998		
Manuel Prieguez	Republican	November 3, 1998 - November 2, 2004		
Carlos Lopez-Cantera	Republican	November 2, 2004 – November 7, 2012		
David Richardson	Democratic	November 6, 2012 – November 6, 2018		
Michael Grieco	Democratic	November 6, 2018 – November 8, 2022		
Vicki Lopez	Republican	November 8, 2022 – November 18, 2025		
Gloria Romero Roses	Democratic	November 3, 2026 – Present		
