= Nick Duran =

American politician from Florida

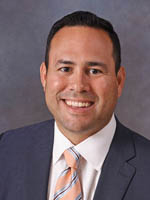

Member of the Florida House of Representatives from the 112th district
- In office November 8, 2016 – November 8, 2022
- Preceded by: José Javier Rodríguez
- Succeeded by: Vicki Lopez

Personal details
- Born: Nicholas Xavier Duran; December 28, 1981 (age 44) Pompano, Florida
- Party: Democratic
- Education: University of Florida (BS); New York Law School (JD)
- Occupation: Healthcare business development executive

Nicholas Xavier Duran is a Democratic member of the Florida Legislature representing the state's 112th House district, which includes part of Miami-Dade County.

== Florida House of Representatives ==
Duran defeated Waldo Faura-Morales in the August 30, 2016, Democratic primary, winning 71.9% of the vote. In the November 8, 2016, general election, Duran won 53.3% of the vote, defeating Republican Rosa Maria "Rosy" Palomino.

Duran was reelected in the November 6, 2018, general election, again defeating Palomino, this time with 57.55% of the vote.
