= Manuel Prieguez =

American politician (born 1971)

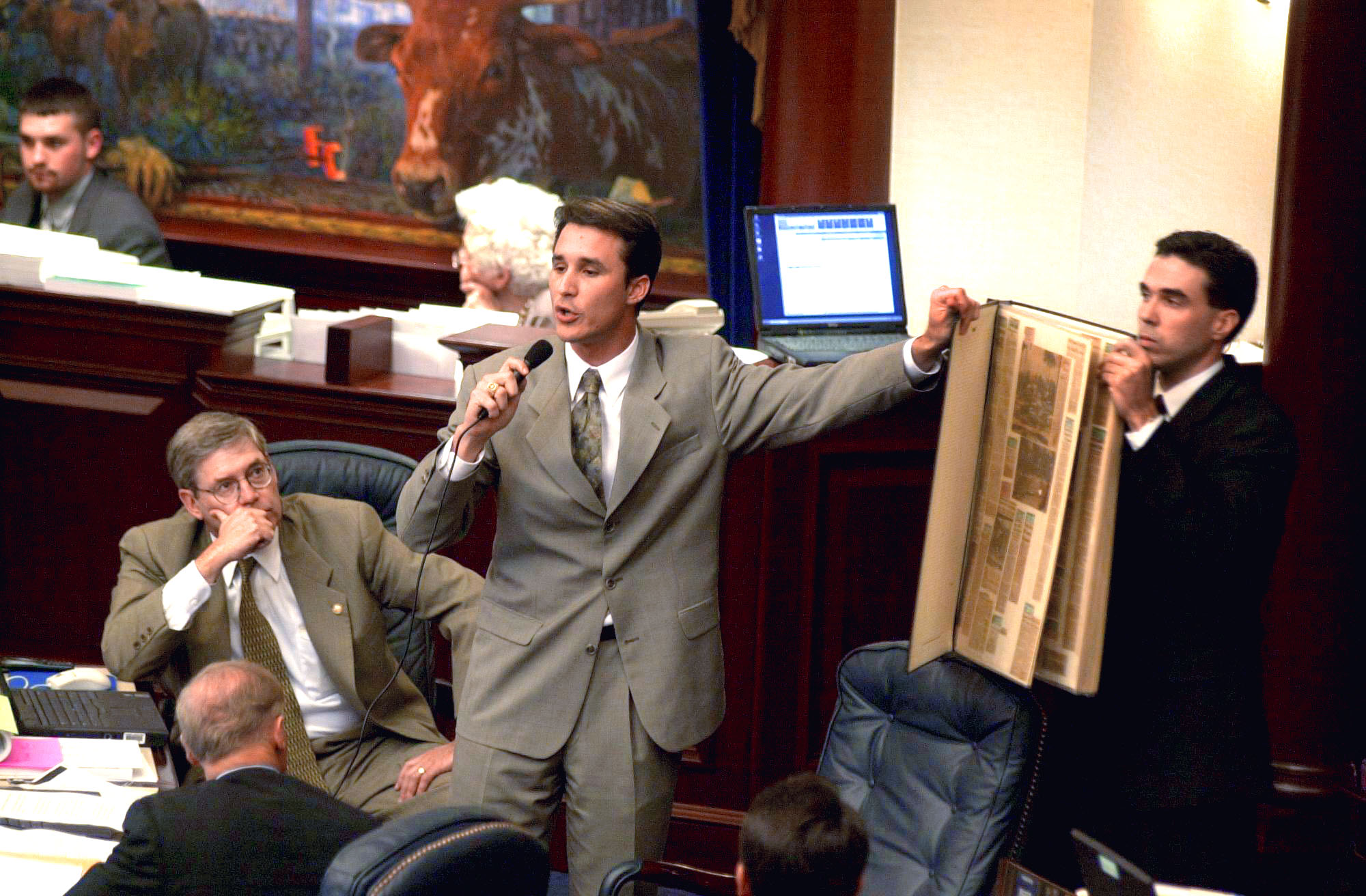
- Prieguez (right) with Dick Kravitz and René García in 2001

Member of the Florida House of Representatives from the 113th district
- In office November 3, 1998 – November 2, 2004
- Preceded by: Luis Morse
- Succeeded by: Carlos Lopez-Cantera

Personal details
- Born: February 24, 1971 (age 55) Miami, Florida, U.S.
- Party: Republican
- Spouse: Luzdel Balandra
- Education: Florida International University

Manuel Prieguez (born February 24, 1971) is an American politician. He served as a Republican member for the 113th district of the Florida House of Representatives.

Prieguez was born in Miami, Florida. He attended Florida International University, where he earned a bachelor's degree in 1993.

In 1998 Prieguez was elected for the 113th district of the Florida House of Representatives, serving until 2004.
