= John Quincy Dickinson =

American politician (1836–1871)

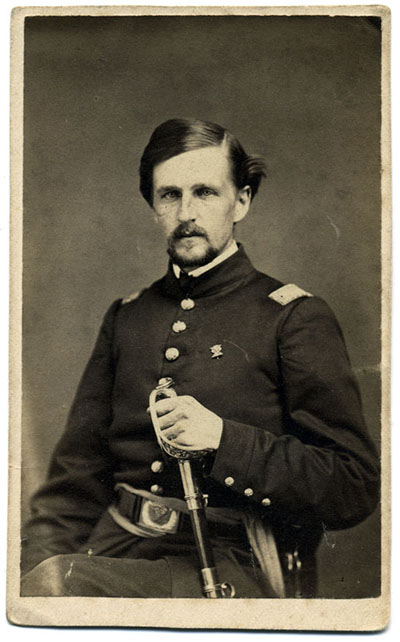
- Dickinson in uniform, c. 1861–1865

Clerk of Court of Jackson County, Florida
- In office February 1869 – April 3, 1871
- Preceded by: John L. Finlayson

Personal details
- Born: November 26, 1836 Benson, Vermont, U.S.
- Died: April 3, 1871 (aged 34) Marianna, Florida, U.S.
- Manner of death: Assassination by gunshot
- Party: Republican
- Education: Middlebury College

Military service
- Branch/service: Union army
- Years of service: 1861–1865
- Rank: Captain
- Unit: 7th Vermont Infantry Regiment
- Battles/wars: American Civil War; Capture of New Orleans

John Quincy Dickinson (November 26, 1836 – April 3, 1871) was an American politician, journalist, and Union army officer who served as Clerk of Court of Jackson County, Florida from 1869 until his assassination in 1871. A victim of the Jackson County War, his assassins are widely believed to have been members of the Ku Klux Klan.

Dickinson served in the army during the American Civil War; taking part in the Capture of New Orleans. After the war, he served as a Freedmen's Bureau agent during Reconstruction until his appointment as county clerk. During his tenure as clerk, Dickinson was an advocate of civil rights for former slaves.

== Early life and education ==
Dickinson was born in Benson, Vermont, on November 26, 1836, to Isaac and Cornelia (née Coleman) Dickinson. In 1860, he graduated from Middlebury College and later worked as a political reporter for the Rutland Herald.

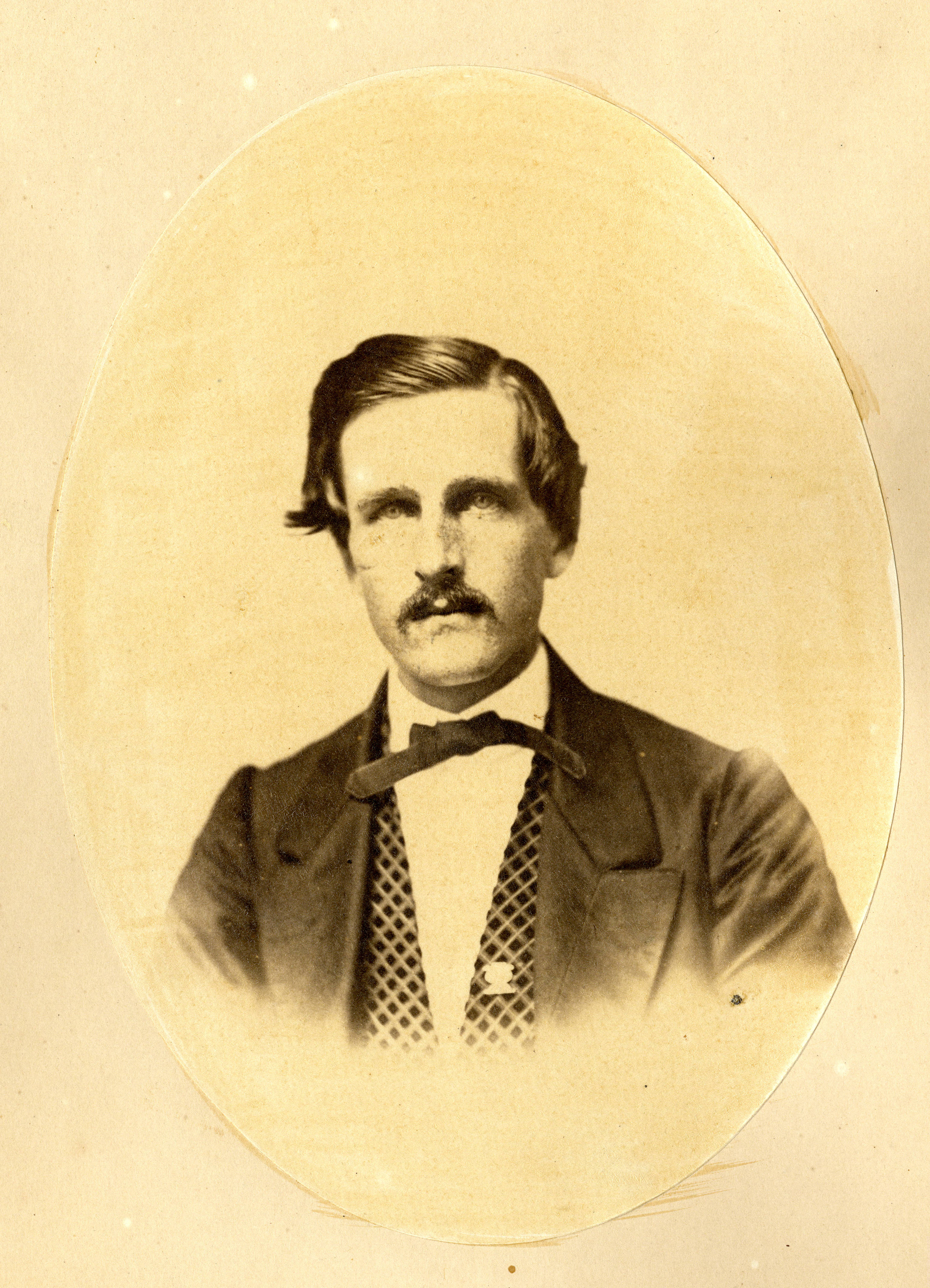
Dickinson's class portrait at Middlebury College in 1860

== Career ==
During the American Civil War, Dickinson fought for the Union and served in the 7th Vermont Infantry Regiment, joining in November 1861. In 1862, he saw action at the Capture of New Orleans and attained the rank of captain in 1865. Dickinson resigned his commission in Brownsville, Texas, in August 1865.

Settling in North Florida after the war, Dickinson operated a sawmill in the Florida panhandle before accepting an appointment as Freedmen’s Bureau agent for Jackson County, Florida, in September 1868. In February 1869, Dickinson was appointed Clerk of Court of Jackson County after the assassination of his predecessor, Dr. John L. Finlayson. During the 1870 Florida elections, Dickinson ensured the right to vote for Black men despite a white mob threatening him and attacking African American voters. Shortly before his murder, he was admitted to the Florida Bar.

=== Jackson County War ===
After the Civil War, Jackson County was plagued by violence as Confederate veterans and KKK members attacked and intimidated freedmen and their sympathizers. The county faced the worst economic conditions in the state, as it had been most extensively developed for cotton plantations before the war, and was adversely affected by the international decline in the market.

In 1869, tensions broke out into violence and Jackson County became the center of a guerrilla war that extended through 1871; it became known as the Jackson County War. The local Ku Klux Klan and Confederate Army veterans directed their violence at eradicating the Republican Party in the county, assassinating more than 150 Republican Party leaders and other prominent African Americans as part of a successful campaign to retain white Democratic power in the county. Another source says that in Jackson County, 200 "leading Republicans" were assassinated in 1869 and 1870 alone; no one was arrested or brought to trial for these crimes.

== Assassination ==
One month before his assassination, Dickinson authored a letter to Secretary of State Jonathan Clarkson Gibbs, writing: "I hardly think it possible for me to get through with another election with my head on my shoulders."

On April 3, 1871, Dickinson was walking home from work when a group of unknown assassins fired 13-14 buckshot rounds at him in Marianna, Florida. He was shot multiple times in his stomach and chest before one assassin approached Dickinson's body and shot him in his heart, killing Dickinson at approximately 9:00 p.m. (EST). At the time of his death, Dickinson was the last Republican politician in Jackson County. His murder drew condemnation across the nation and crowds of mourners in Florida and Vermont gathered to pay their respects. He was buried in Benson, Vermont.
