= Stacy Volnick =

American academic administrator

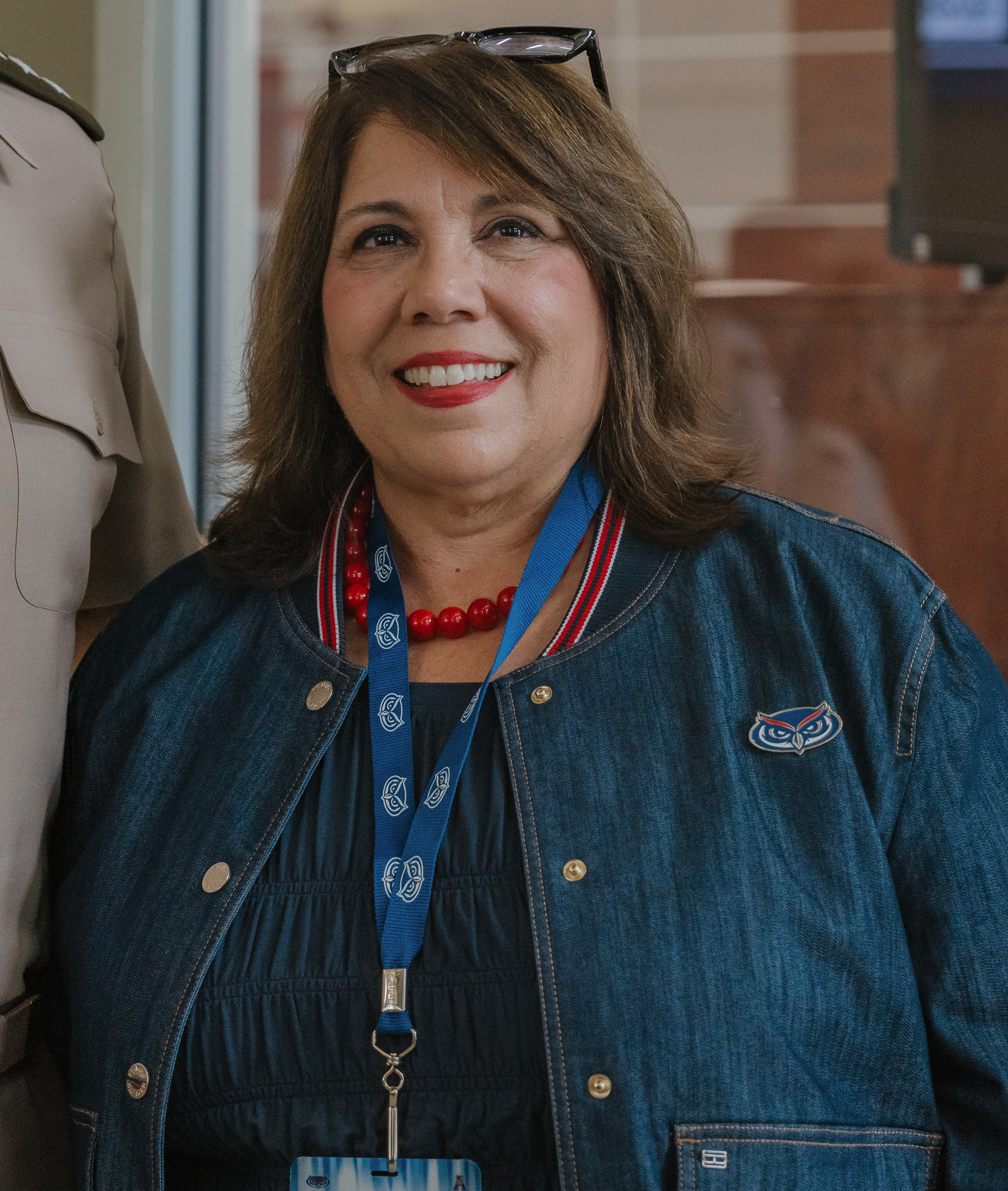
- Volnick in 2024

President of Florida Atlantic University
- Interim
- In office January 1, 2023 – March 10, 2025
- Preceded by: John W. Kelly
- Succeeded by: Adam Hasner

Personal details
- Born: 1963 or 1964 (age 61–62)
- Education: Florida Atlantic University (BA, MA, PhD)

Stacy Ann Volnick is an American academic administrator who served as the interim president of Florida Atlantic University from 2023 to 2025.

== Life ==
According to Volnick, she moved from Poughkeepsie, New York to South Florida at nine years old and grew up near the campus of Florida Atlantic University (FAU). She completed a bachelor's degree in communications and a master's degree in educational leadership at the FAU. She completed a Ph.D. at FAU in 2022. Her dissertation was titled, Women University Presidents Who Break Through the Glass Ceiling: At What Price?.

Volnick joined the FAU faculty in 1991. In 2013, she became vice president for administrative affairs and chief administrative officer. In August 2022, Volnick was promoted to chief operating officer and vice president of administrative affairs. On September 19, 2022, the FAU board of trustees selected Volnick as the interim president. Her selection as confirmed by the Florida Board of Governors on November 9, 2022. She assumed the role on January 1, 2023, succeeding John W. Kelly. In November 2023, her term as interim president was extended to the end of the 2024 calendar year. In February 2025, it was announced that Adam Hasner had been voted the next president of FAU and that Volnick would continue as interim president until his first day in office. He officially took office and replaced Volnick on March 10, 2025. Volnick continued to serve as an administrator at FAU. As of October 2025, she was the school's Executive Vice President and Chief Operating Officer.
