= Mary Ellen Hawkins =

American politician (1923–2023)

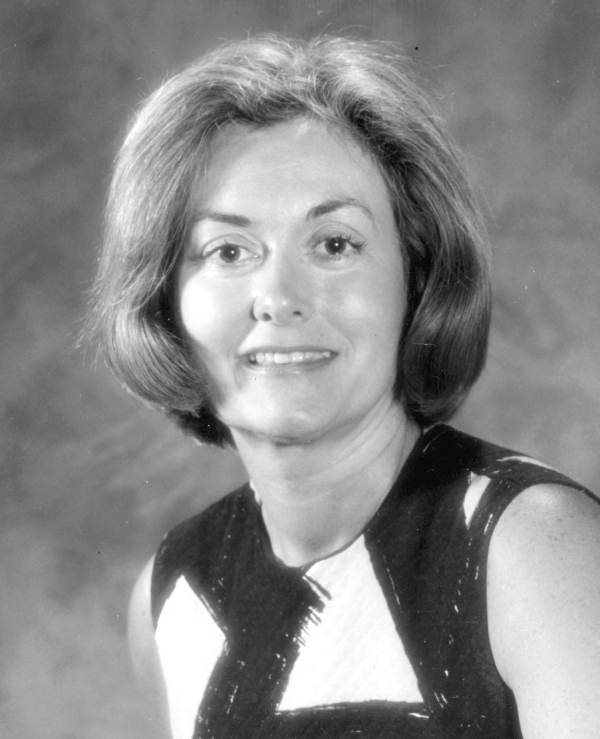

Member of the Florida House of Representatives from the 76th district
- In office November 3, 1992 – November 8, 1994
- Preceded by: Bert J. Harris Jr.
- Succeeded by: Burt Saunders

Member of the Florida House of Representatives from the 75th district
- In office November 2, 1982 – November 3, 1992
- Preceded by: Fred Burrall
- Succeeded by: Tim Ireland

Member of the Florida House of Representatives from the 89th district
- In office November 5, 1974 – November 2, 1982
- Preceded by: James Lorenzo Walker
- Succeeded by: Joseph H. Titone

Personal details
- Born: Mary Ellen Higgins; April 18, 1923 Birmingham, Alabama, U.S.
- Died: January 7, 2023 (aged 99)
- Party: Republican
- Spouse: James H. Hawkins (div. 1971)
- Children: 3
- Education: University of Alabama
- Occupation: writer, congressional aide, educator

Mary Ellen Higgins Hawkins (April 18, 1923 – January 7, 2023) was an American politician in the state of Florida. She served in the Florida House of Representatives from 1974 to 1994, representing Collier County.

In December 2014, it was announced that Hawkins would be honored as one of the "Women Who Make Southwest Florida" in a ceremony in March 2015.

Hawkins died on January 7, 2023, at the age of 99.

Florida House of Representatives
Preceded by James Lorenzo Walker	Member of the Florida House of Representatives from the 89th district 1974–1982	Succeeded by Joe Titone
Preceded by Fred Burrall	Member of the Florida House of Representatives from the 75th district 1982–1992	Succeeded by Tim Ireland
Preceded by Bert J. Harris Jr.	Member of the Florida House of Representatives from the 76th district 1992–1994	Succeeded by Burt Saunders
