= Luis Morse =

American politician

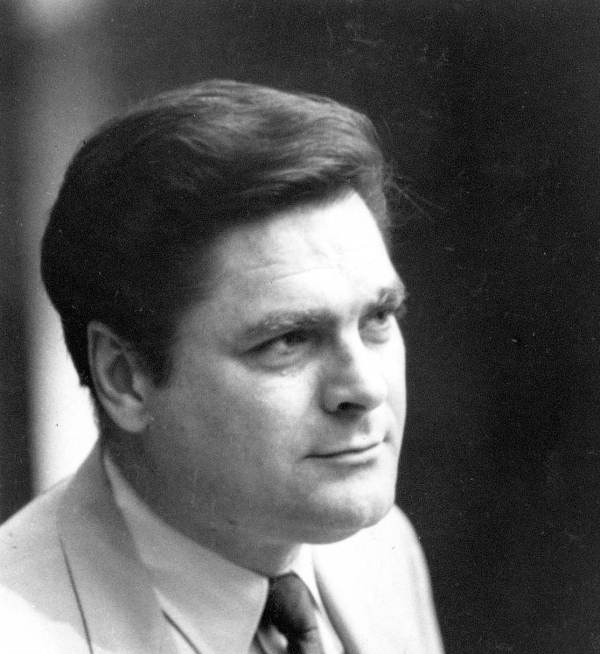
- Morse in the 1980s

Speaker Pro Tempore of the Florida House of Representatives
- In office Unknown – November 17, 1998
- Succeeded by: Dennis Jones

Member of the Florida House of Representatives from the 113th district
- In office November 6, 1984 – November 3, 1998
- Preceded by: Humberto Cortina
- Succeeded by: Manuel Prieguez

Personal details
- Born: May 20, 1940 Havana, Cuba
- Died: May 28, 2023 (aged 83)
- Party: Republican
- Education: University of Florida (BS)
- Profession: Engineer

Luis C. Morse (May 20, 1940 – May 28, 2023) was an American politician.

Morse served as a state representative in the House of Representatives of the U.S. state of Florida. He lived in Miami, Florida.

== Education ==
Morse received his bachelor's degree in engineering from the University of Florida in 1968.
