= Jon Maples =

American politician

Member of the Florida House of Representatives from the 87th district
- Incumbent
- Assumed office November 3, 2026
- Preceded by: Emily Gregory

Personal details
- Born: July 9, 1982 (age 44)
- Party: Republican
- Website: Campaign website

Jon Maples (born July 9, 1982) is an American politician. He graduated from Palm Beach Atlantic University in 2005. A member of the Republican Party, he has served in the Florida House of Representatives since 2026, representing the 87th district. He unseated incumbent Democrat Emily Gregory at the 2026 election. In March 2026, he was a candidate in the 2026 special election.
