= Gloria Romero Roses =

American politician

Member of the Florida House of Representatives from the 113th district
- Incumbent
- Assumed office November 3, 2026
- Preceded by: Vicki Lopez

Personal details
- Party: Democratic
- Website: Campaign website

Gloria Romero Roses is an American politician. A member of the Democratic Party, she has served in the Florida House of Representatives since 2026, representing the 113th district. She flipped a Republican district at the 2026 election. She was a primary candidate in 2012 for Florida's 26th congressional district. She has a background in real estate.
