= Edward J. Trombetta =

American politician (died 2008)

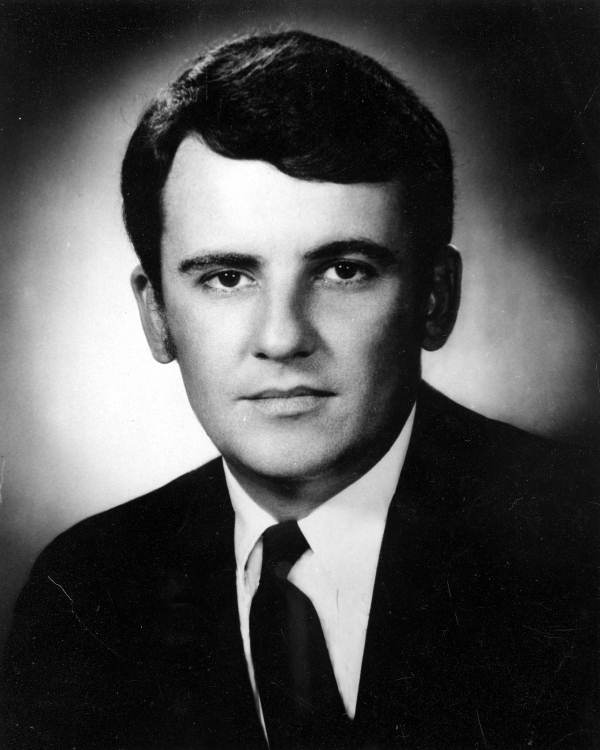
- Trombetta in 1970

Member of the Florida House of Representatives from the 89th district
- In office November 3, 1970 – November 7, 1972
- Preceded by: Charles J. King
- Succeeded by: James Lorenzo Walker

Personal details
- Born: Edward John Trombetta
- Died: January 27, 2008 (aged 69)
- Party: Democratic
- Children: 3
- Education: University of Notre Dame

Edward John Trombetta (died January 27, 2008) was an American politician. He served as a Democratic member for the 89th district of the Florida House of Representatives from 1970 to 1972.

Trombetta was originally from New York. He attended the University of Notre Dame, and served in the United States Marine Corps. In 1970, Trombetta was elected for the 89th district of the Florida House of Representatives, succeeding Charles J. King. In 1972, Trombetta was succeeded by James Lorenzo Walker for the 89th district. He lived in Broward County, Florida before moving to Tallahassee, Florida in 1973.

Trombetta died in January 2008, at the age of 69.
