= Humberto Cortina =

American politician (born 1941)

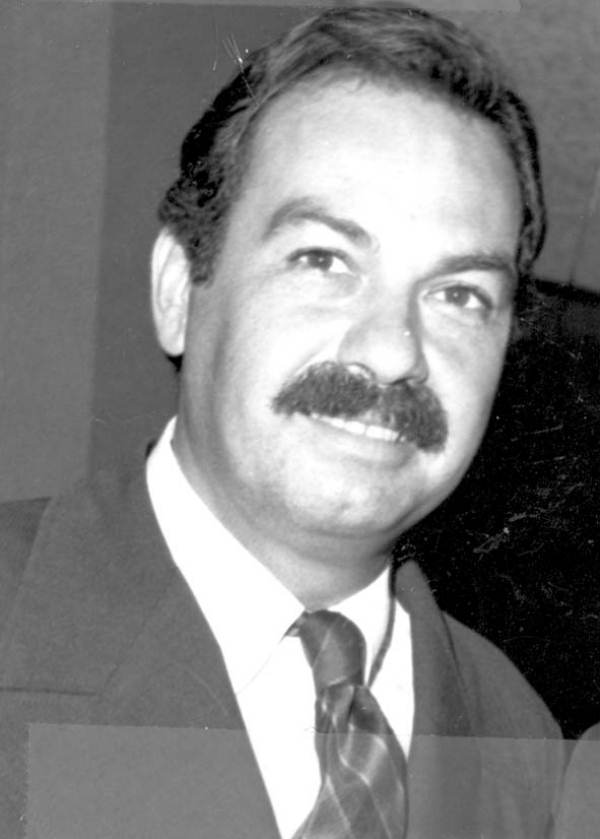

Member of the Florida House of Representatives from the 113th district
- In office 1982–1984
- Preceded by: Bill Sadowski
- Succeeded by: Luis Morse

Personal details
- Born: August 7, 1941 (age 84) Havana, Cuba
- Party: Republican
- Occupation: consultant

Humberto J. Cortina (born August 7, 1941) was an American politician in the state of Florida. He served in the Florida House of Representatives from 1982 to 1984 for the 113th district.

== Early life ==
Cortina was born in Cuba and came to the United States in 1960. He is a veteran of the Bay of Pigs Invasion in 1961, as a member of Brigade 2506. He was injured in the invasion and captured, spending nearly two years in a prison in Cuba before a ransom was paid for the release of the captured Brigada members. His grandfather was José Manuel Cortina, president of the League of Nations, and his father was Humberto J. Cortina Sr. was a Cuban legislator. His cousin, Johnny López de la Cruz, also served in Brigada 2506.

Cortina became an investment banker in Miami, Florida.

== Political career ==
He served in the Florida House of Representatives from 1982 to 1984 for the 113th district. He won the 1982 election against Democrat Lincoln Diaz-Balart with 6,539 votes, compared to Diaz-Balart's 5,784 votes. In 1983, with fellow representative Ileana Ros, he opposed a proposal to remove a required Florida high school course on Communism.

== Later life ==
Cortina later became an executive for Havana Cool, a 1992 proposal to create a basketball franchise in Cuba.
