= Nancy Harrington =

American politician (1926–2020)

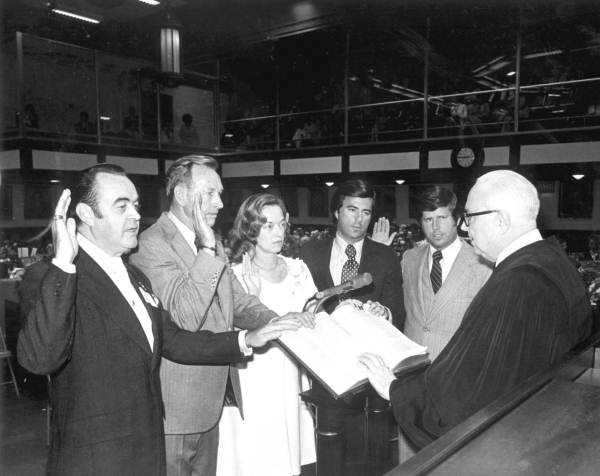
- Harrington (center) with Jim Eckhart, Bob Hector, Barry Richard and Tom Gallagher in 1974

Member of the Florida House of Representatives from the 113th district
- In office November 5, 1974 – November 2, 1976
- Preceded by: John Cyril Malloy
- Succeeded by: Bill Sadowski

Personal details
- Born: May 15, 1926 Bay Shore, New York, U.S.
- Died: May 22, 2020 (aged 94)
- Party: Democratic
- Spouse: Donald F. Harrington (m. 1956; died 2013)
- Education: Fenn College; Kent State University

Nancy Overton Harrington (May 15, 1926 – May 22, 2020) was an American politician.

Harrington was born in Bay Shore, New York. She went to Fenn College and Kent State University. She was involved in the airline and automobile industries. Harrington owned the Harrington Auto Imports in Cleveland, Ohio. She served as an administrative aide in Tallahassee, Florida. Harrington served in the Florida House of Representatives, from 1974 to 1976, from Coral Gables, Florida, and was a Democrat.
