= County constitutional officer =

Leadership position in county governments of the U.S. state of Florida

- Style: The Honorable
- Type: Plural executive
- Status: CEO/Administrator
- Member of: County government
- Reports to: County commission
- Seat: County seat
- Nominator: Direct election
- Appointer: Governor of Florida (Note: The Governor of Florida may appoint a successor to fill a vacancy until the next regularly scheduled election.)
- Term length: 4 years; renewable
- Constituting instrument: Florida Constitution
- Formation: 1885
- Superseded by: State constitutional officer

In the U.S. state of Florida, county constitutional officers are independently elected officials in each county who lead departments and perform specific functions of the county's government. The Florida Constitution establishes five county constitutional officers: the sheriff, tax collector, property appraiser, supervisor of elections, and clerk of the circuit court. Elected state attorneys, public defenders, county commissioners, school board members, and the superintendents of schools may also be considered constitutional officers. In the event of the death, resignation, or removal from office of a county constitutional officer, the Governor of Florida is empowered to appoint a successor to fill the vacancy until the next regularly scheduled election.

Under Florida law, each county has state officers who are elected locally, and their salaries and office expenses are paid locally. Constitutional officers establish the budgets for their offices, independent of the operating budget set by the Board of County Commissioners. Although they operate independently, constitutional officers work in cooperation with the BCC in order to serve the public efficiently and cost-effectively. They are elected in partisan elections every four years, in concurrence with presidential elections and are not subject to term limits. The state constitution allows for counties to hold a referendum to abolish a constitutional officer in their county, with the exception of the position of clerk of court. Counties may also hold a referendum to establish their county's constitutional officers as non-partisan roles. While several counties have made small changes (for instance a non-partisan supervisor of elections in Leon or an independent comptroller in Orange), only one county, Miami-Dade, has made significant alterations, which were reverted in 2025.

The mayor of Jacksonville is a county constitutional officer, as per the Jacksonville Consolidation. Despite being independently elected county officials, the mayor of Miami-Dade County, mayor of Orange County, and Volusia County chair are not county constitutional officers.

== Constitutional officers ==
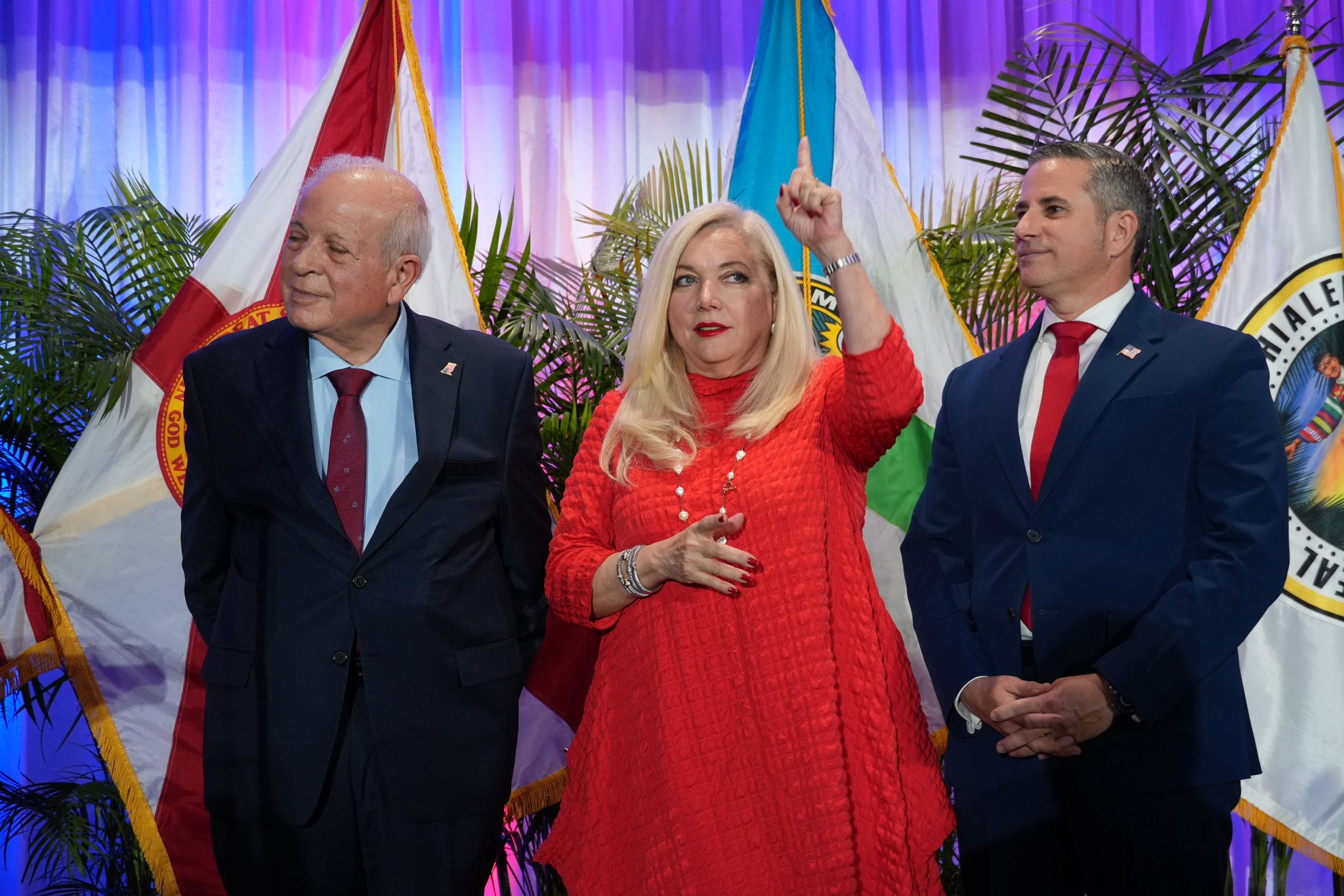
Miami-Dade County property appraiser Tomás Regalado, Supervisor of Elections Alina Garcia, and Tax Collector Dariel Fernandez, 2025

The Florida Constitution establishes five county constitutional officers:

- Sheriff: oversees law enforcement, public safety and often corrections for the county.
- Tax collector: receives property tax and other payments for both the county and state; head of the county DMV.
- Property Appraiser: assesses the fair value of all property so that property taxes can be computed.
- Clerk of the Circuit Court (also serves as ex officio county comptroller, county auditor, and county recorder): maintains public records and is clerk to the county commission.
- Supervisor of Elections: registers voters and organizes all elections in the county.

== Duties and responsibilities ==
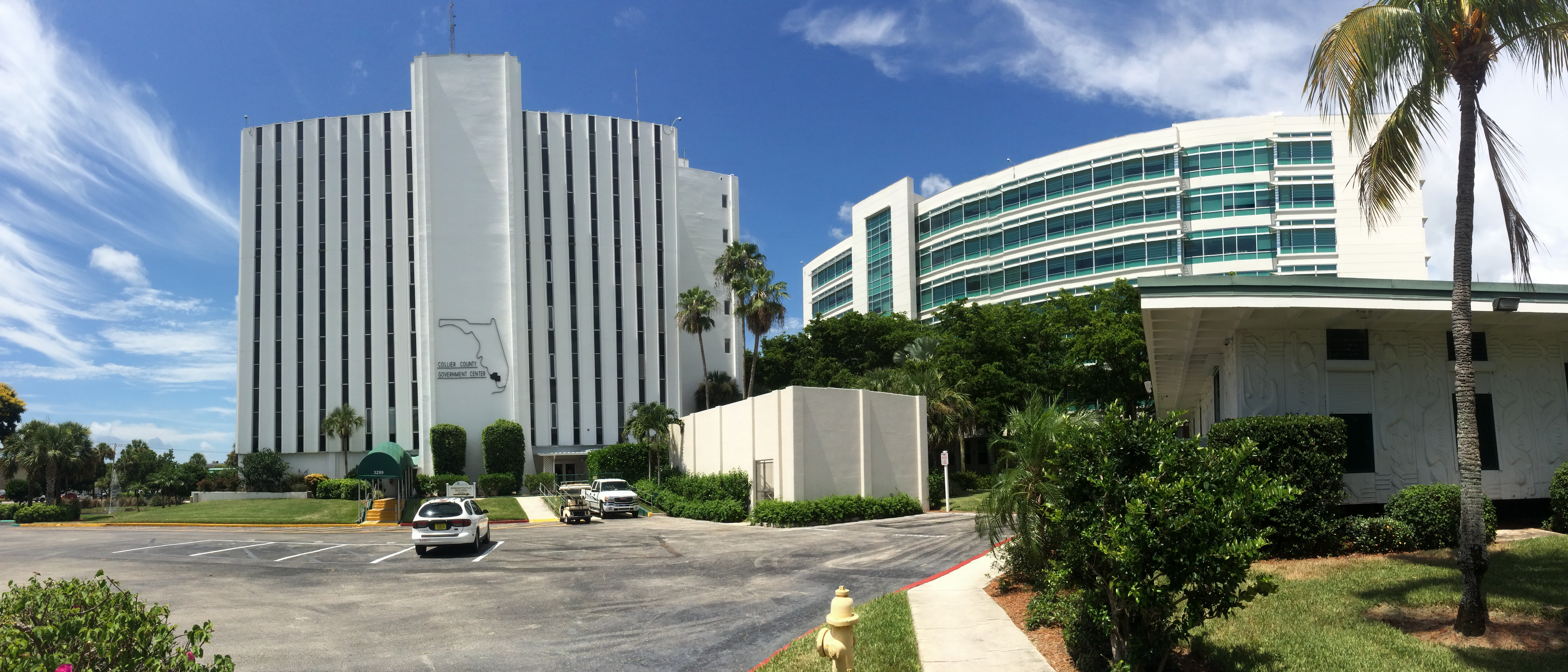
Collier County government center

List duties and responsibilities of Florida county constitutional officers:

- Constitutional officers are directly accountable to the public for the proper operation of county government
- Constitutional officers are charged with maintaining public order and ensuring equal civil and political rights to all
- As chief executive of their respective office, constitutional officers are empowered to appoint all deputies, employees, and other staff
- Constitutional officers shall perform their executive and administrative functions as specified by general law

== Political role ==
County constitutional officers are often members of their local political party executive committee. County parties vote to endorse city, county, state, and congressional officials in primary elections on behalf of the state parties, which can lead to controversy over party officials voting to endorse themselves and using party funds to aid their campaigns. In each county in Florida, the Republican and the Democratic parties maintain a state committeeman and state committeewoman, independently elected countywide every four years. They are not county constitutional officers.

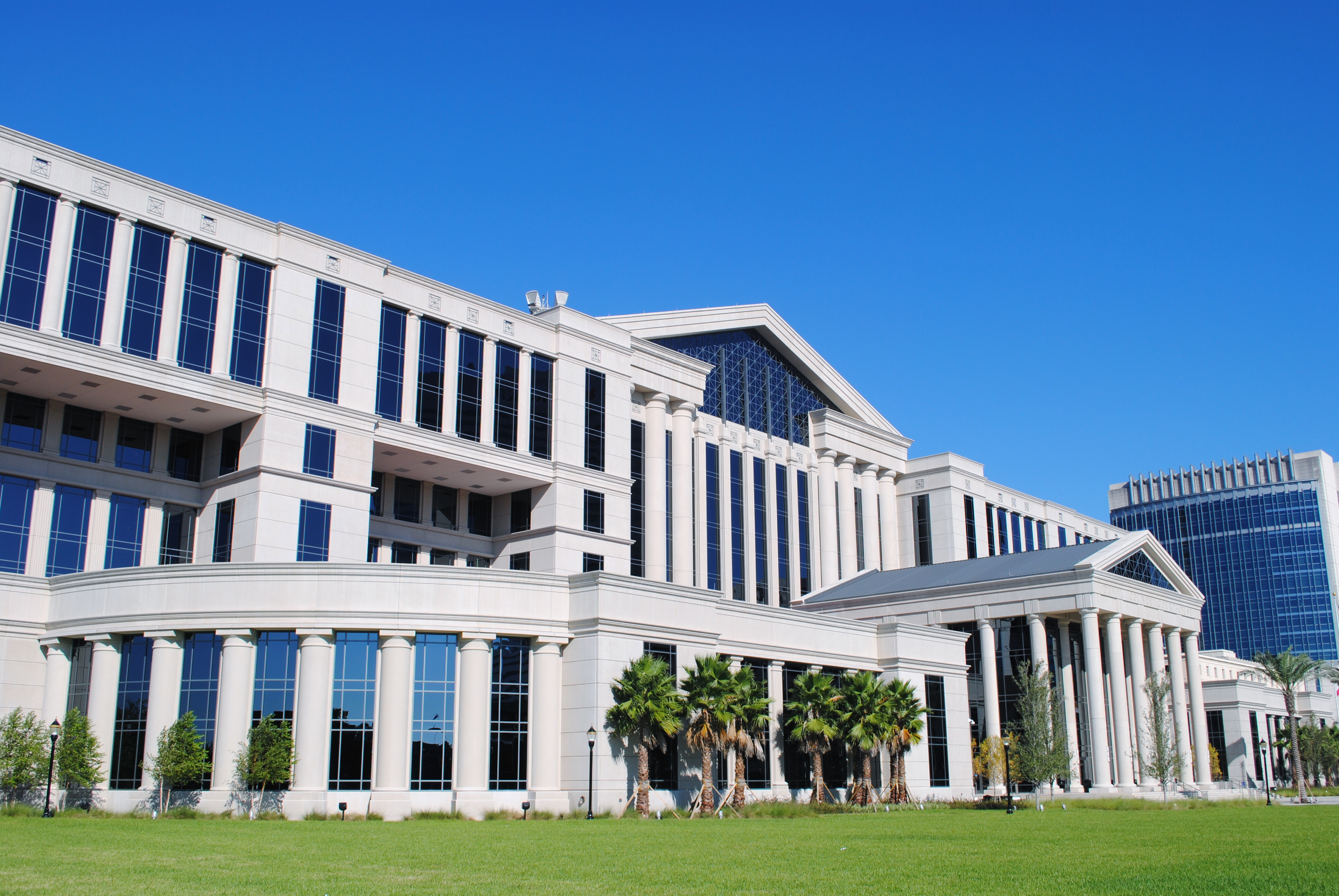
Duval County Courthouse; seat of the Duval County clerk

In recent years, many corporations, including Florida Power & Light, have become involved in county constitutional officer elections. Real estate development companies have also been involved in county constitutional officer elections, specifically county commission and property appraiser races.

== History ==
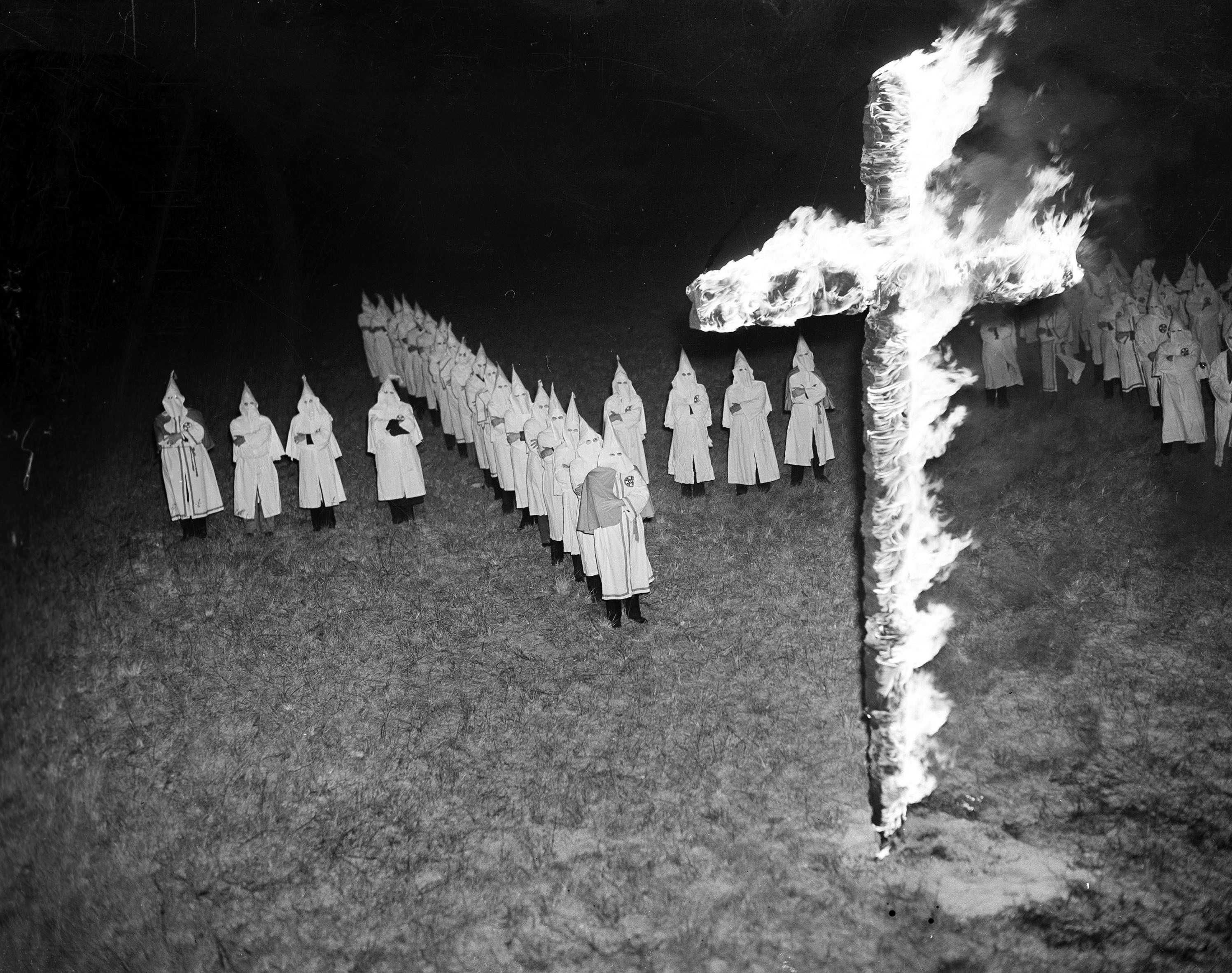
KKK cross burning in Hillsborough County, Florida, January 1939

During the Jim Crow era, local governments in Florida were dominated by the Democratic Party. Aided by members of the Ku Klux Klan, they stripped citizens of their ability to choose their representatives and successfully established courthouse cliques. Widespread electoral fraud, aided by county-level politicians, and acts of political violence, such as the Jackson County War, helped secure Democratic control of the "Solid South" for decades.

=== Notable constitutional officers ===
- Napoleon B. Broward, 19th governor of Florida, sheriff of Duval County, Florida
- Kurt S. Browning, 27th Florida secretary of state, supervisor of elections of Pasco County, Florida (Note: First elected at the age of 22, he was the youngest county elections official in Florida history.)
- Chad Chronister, 30th sheriff of Hillsborough County, Florida
- Jerry Demings, 5th mayor of Orange County, 28th sheriff of Orange County, Florida
- John Quincy Dickinson, Clerk of Court of Jackson County, Florida
- Carlos A. Giménez, U.S. representative from Florida, Miami-Dade County commissioner
- Spessard Holland, U.S. senator from Florida, prosecutor of Polk County, Florida
- Willis V. McCall, 10th sheriff of Lake County, Florida
- Henry L. Mitchell, 16th governor of Florida, clerk and treasurer of Hillsborough County, Florida
- Jared Moskowitz, U.S. representative from Florida, Broward County commissioner (Note: In 2021, Moskowitz was appointed by Governor Ron DeSantis as a county constitutional officer.)
- Rich Nugent, U.S. representative from Florida, sheriff of Hernando County, Florida
- Samuel Pasco, U.S. senator from Florida, clerk of court of Jefferson County, Florida
- John Rutherford, U.S. representative from Florida, sheriff of Jacksonville
- David Sholtz, 26th governor of Florida, state attorney for the Seventh Judicial Circuit Court of Florida
- Brenda Snipes, Broward County supervisor of elections

== See also ==
- Government of Florida
- Elections in Florida
- Politics of Florida

== Work cited ==
- Moore, James Tice (2014). "County Politics". Law and Politics. The New Encyclopedia of Southern Culture. Vol. 10. UNC Press Books. pp. 173–176. ISBN 9781469616742.
