= Joseph Abruzzo =

American politician (born 1980)

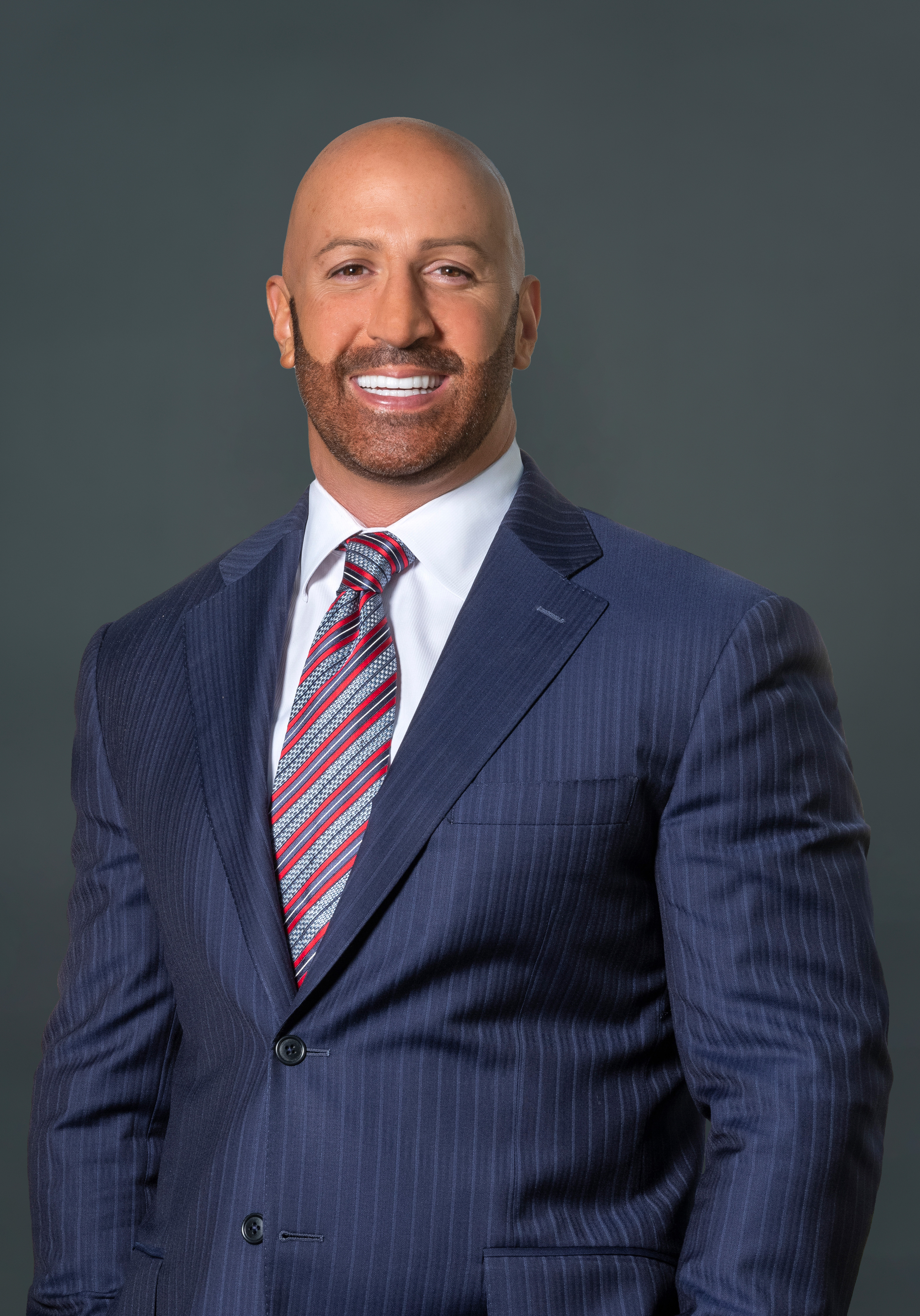
- Abruzzo in 2023

County Administrator and CEO of Palm Beach County
- Incumbent
- Assumed office August 18, 2025
- Preceded by: Verdenia C. Baker

Clerk of the Circuit Court & Comptroller of Palm Beach County
- In office January 5, 2021 – June 2025
- Preceded by: Sharon Bock

Member of the Florida House of Representatives
- In office November 8, 2016 – November 6, 2018
- Preceded by: Kevin Rader
- Succeeded by: Tina Polsky
- Constituency: 81st District
- In office November 4, 2008 – November 6, 2012
- Preceded by: Shelley Vana
- Succeeded by: Redistricted
- Constituency: 85th District

Member of the Florida Senate from the 25th district
- In office November 6, 2012 – November 8, 2016
- Preceded by: Redistricted
- Succeeded by: Redistricted

Personal details
- Born: August 14, 1980 (age 46)
- Party: Democratic
- Education: Lynn University (BA) Pepperdine University School of Law (MLS)

Military service
- Branch/service: United States Coast Guard Reserve Port Security Specialist
- Years of service: 2005–2013

Joseph Abruzzo (born August 14, 1980) is an American official who is currently the Administrator and CEO for Palm Beach County, Florida. Previously, he served as the clerk of the circuit court and comptroller of Palm Beach County, Florida from 2021 until his resignation in 2025. A member of the Democratic Party, he previously served in the Florida House of Representatives and the Florida Senate.

== History ==
Abruzzo attended Lynn University, where he served as President of the Student Government Association and was appointed by the Boca Raton City Council to the Boca Raton Education Advisory Board. He graduated with a degree in international communications in 2003 and joined the United States Coast Guard Reserve later that year, where he worked as a port security specialist.

== Clerk of the Circuit Court & Comptroller (2021–2025) ==
Abruzzo was elected to serve as the Clerk of the Circuit Court & Comptroller for Palm Beach County, Florida in November 2020. He was sworn into office on January 5, 2021. He was re-elected in November 2024 for a second term.

Under Abruzzo's leadership, the Clerk's office achieved record investment income for Palm Beach County's fiscal years 2023 and 2024, reaching $172 million and $215 million respectively. Palm Beach County became the world's largest investor in Israel government bonds, amounting to $700 Million of a $4.67 Billion total portfolio as of 2024. In April 2024, the president of Israel, Isaac Herzog, sent Abruzzo a letter thanking Palm Beach County for the investment.

A lawsuit by anonymous Palm Beach residents filed in 2024 called the investment "speculative," and attorneys for the Clerk’s office responded by calling the lawsuit “politically charged and fatally flawed.”

Abruzzo added services by introducing a service for customers to buy electronically certified documents for court and official records, expanded the service center in Royal Palm Beach, and broadened public outreach for services such as Property Fraud Alerts and the Hope Card program for people with protective court orders.

Abruzzo advocated for legislation that allowed for the release of Jeffrey Epstein's grand jury records in July 2024. The release of the records to the public helped "ensure transparency to the people of Palm Beach County that we serve every day, and to the international community that has closely followed the Epstein case."

In June 2025, Abruzzo resigned as clerk. Since July 2025, Abruzzo has worked as the county administrator.

== Florida House of Representatives ==
In 2005, State Representative Anne Gannon announced that she would run for the Florida Senate rather than seek re-election in 2006. Abruzzo ran to succeed her in the 86th District, which included Boca Raton, Boynton Beach, and Delray Beach in eastern Palm Beach County. However, when Gannon suspended her Senate campaign to instead seek re-election, Abruzzo switched races, instead opting to challenge Republican Palm Beach County Commissioner Mary McCarty. However, when Gannon again announced that she would not seek re-election to run for Palm Beach County tax collector, Abruzzo dropped out of the race against McCarty to run to succeed Gannon, noting, "I have been interested in serving in the legislature from day one." Abruzzo faced Maria Sachs, Mark Alan Siegel, and Harriet Lerman in the Democratic primary, and despite a close campaign, ultimately lost to Sachs, receiving 26% of the vote to her 34%.

State Representative Shelley Vana opted against seeking re-election in 2008 to instead run for the Palm Beach County Commission. Abruzzo ran to succeed her in the 85th District, which included Lake Worth and Wellington. He won the Democratic primary unopposed, and faced Howard Coates, an attorney and the Republican nominee, in the general election. Abruzzo ended up defeating Coates handily, winning his first term in the legislature with 57% of the vote to Coates' 43%. During his first term in the legislature, Abruzzo worked with State Senator Dave Aronberg to author "Nicole's Law," a piece of legislation requiring "horseback riders 16 and younger to wear a helmet when riding on public roads and rights of way and while taking riding lessons," following the death of a teenage girl in Loxahatchee. Following the resignation of Palm Beach County Commissioner Mary McCarty, who had endorsed Abruzzo in 2008, following corruption charges, Abruzzo called for a state legislative review of county government, noting, "The serious and unfortunate events which have occurred have shaken the public's confidence in their county government."

When he ran for re-election in 2010, Abruzzo faced Tami Donnally, a ministry administrator and the Republican nominee. Donnally attacked Abruzzo for his opposition to a state constitutional amendment that aimed to prevent the Patient Protection and Affordable Care Act's insurance mandate from being enforced in Florida, while Abruzzo campaigned on his accomplishments in the legislature. Abruzzo narrowly defeated Donnally to win re-election, receiving 53% of the vote to her 47%

== Florida Senate ==
In 2012, following the reconfiguration of the state's legislative districts, Abruzzo opted to run for the Florida Senate rather than seek re-election. He won the Democratic primary unopposed in the 25th District, and faced Melanie Peterson, a horse broker and the Republican nominee. Despite the district's Democratic lean, the Republican Party of Florida targeted the race, viewing it as a potential pickup opportunity. Abruzzo campaigned on his legislative record, which included passing twenty bills in four years, while Peterson presented herself as an outsider. She attacked him for his proposed 2013 legislative priorities, which included a texting while driving ban, increased funding for foreign-language education in public schools, and animal rights legislation. The Palm Beach Post endorsed Abruzzo over Peterson, citing his opposition to Governor Rick Scott's proposal to eliminate the state income tax and education cuts. The Sun-Sentinel concurred, noting that while Peterson "shows promise as a first-time candidate," Abruzzo "has a track record that fits this new district" and his "experience and productivity gives him a sizeable edge." Despite the perceived closeness of the race, Abruzzo won election to the Senate by a wide margin, winning 57% of the vote to Peterson's 43%.

During his tenure in the Senate, Abruzzo worked with State Representative Dave Kerner to author legislation that severed the "parental rights of a rapist if a child is conceived as the result of the attack," which unanimously passed both chambers of the legislative and was signed by Governor Rick Scott. He sponsored legislation that would have prevented discrimination against members of the LGBT community in employment, housing, or public accommodations, though it died in the Senate Judiciary Committee.

Abruzzo was appointed by the Senate President to serve as the Joint Legislative Auditing Committee Chairman, the Chairman of the Public Service Commission Nominating Council, the Vice Chairman of the Committee on Finance and Tax, the Vice Chairman of the Committee on Commerce and Tourism, Vice Chairman of the Committee on Environmental Protection and Conservation, and by the Senate Minority Leader as the Minority Whip of the Florida Senate.

== Return to the House ==
Following court-ordered redistricting of Senate districts in 2016, Abruzzo decided to run for the State House again rather than seek re-election in his reconfigured Senate district.

During his three terms in the Florida House, Abruzzo served as the Democratic Ranking Member on the Ways and Means Committee, the PreK-12 Innovation Subcommittee, and the Local, Federal & Veterans Affairs Subcommittee. He was also appointed by the House Minority Leader to serve as the Minority Whip of the Florida House.

== Sources ==
- Florida Senate - Joseph Abruzzo
- Florida House of Representatives - Joseph Abruzzo
- Clerk of the Circuit Court & Comptroller - Meet Joseph Abruzzo
