= Dave Kerner =

American politician

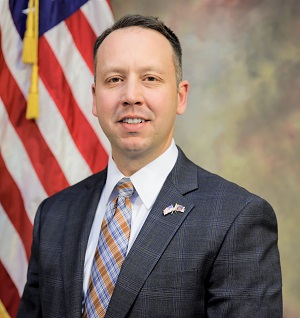

Executive Director of the Florida Department of Highway Safety and Motor Vehicles and Director of the Florida Highway Patrol
- Incumbent
- Assumed office January 5, 2023
- Preceded by: Terry L. Rhodes

Member of the Florida House of Representatives from the 87th district
- In office November 20, 2012 – November 20, 2016
- Preceded by: Bill Hager
- Succeeded by: David Silvers

Personal details
- Born: August 24, 1983 (age 43) Palm Beach County, Florida
- Party: Democratic
- Education: University of Florida (BA, JD)
- Profession: Executive Director, Mayor, County Commissioner, Attorney, State Representative, police officer

David M. Kerner (born August 24, 1983) currently serves as the executive director of the Florida Department of Highway Safety and Motor Vehicles and the director of the Florida Highway Patrol. He is the former county mayor and a county commissioner for, Palm Beach County and a former Democratic member of the Florida House of Representatives. He is a sworn law enforcement officer and is a former special prosecutor. He also is a practicing complex litigation trial attorney in West Palm Beach, Florida, and is known as a leader on issues relating to constitutional law, criminal law, judicial issues, and law enforcement issues. He lives in Lake Worth Beach.

== Early life, education, and career ==
Kerner was born and raised in Lake Worth Beach, Florida, and attended Suncoast Community High School, where he graduated in 2002. Afterwards, he moved to Gainesville, where he attended the University of Florida, was a member of Beta Theta Pi (Pledge Class - Fall 2003), graduating with a degree in political science and criminology in 2006. Simultaneously, he enrolled in the Police Academy at Santa Fe Community College, where he received his certification as a police officer in 2004. He then worked as a police officer in Alachua from 2004 to 2007, while studying full-time at the University of Florida. Kerner was named "Police Officer of the Year" in 2006 and served as the Department Representative to the Fraternal Order of Police, Lodge 62. In 2007, Kerner then attended the University of Florida College of Law, graduating with his law degree in 2010. While in law school, and until his election to the Florida House of Representatives, he served as a part-time police officer with the Florida Wildlife Commission, working as a marine and woodland/resource patrol officer. While at the University of Florida, Kerner held several leadership and service positions, including serving as the Chief Justice of the UF Supreme Court, Chairman of the 2010 UF Student Government Constitutional Revision Commission, and vice-president of the law school. While in law school at the University of Florida, Kerner was inducted into Florida Blue Key.

Upon becoming a member of the Florida Bar, he was selected to serve as a Special Prosecutor for the Palm Beach County State's Attorney. He then began work as a civil litigation attorney for Schuler, Halvorson, Weisser, Zoeller & Overbeck, P.A., where he practices wrongful death, personal injury, and class action law for plaintiffs. Kerner has continued to serve as a practicing trial and complex litigation attorney while serving in the Florida House of Representatives. He has served as lead counsel in several state-wide class action cases challenging the constitutionality of red light camera ordinances. He has appeared before the Florida Supreme Court in the landmark state preemption red light camera case of Masone v. City of Aventura, 147 So.3d 492 (Fla. 2014), and won.

== Florida House of Representatives ==
In 2012, after the Florida House of Representatives districts were redrawn, Kerner opted to run in the newly created 87th District. While the 87th District is 52% Hispanic, it is also where Kerner was born and raised, and had resided except for his time in college, on the police force, and while in law school. He faced Mike Rios in the Democratic primary, whom he easily defeated with 68% of the vote. Kerner was unopposed in the general election, and was sworn into his first term.

Kerner emerged as the most effective Democratic lawmaker in the Florida House of Representatives since his election. He sponsored fourteen bills that became law, and consistently led the Democratic opposition against several high-profile pro-gun bills backed by the National Rifle Association of America (NRA).

== Ideology and policy preferences ==
Rep. Dave Kerner has been identified as a Conservative Democrat. However, he has opposed NRA-backed bills advocating open carrying of firearms and the carrying of firearms on college campuses. He has also opposed anti-LGBT and anti-abortion legislation. Kerner has publicly reprimanded other lawmakers for voting for bills that are "clearly" unconstitutional.

In the 2022 Florida gubernatorial election, Kerner endorsed the Republican incumbent Ron DeSantis over his Democratic challenger, former governor Charlie Crist.

== Major policy positions and legislation ==
Kerner is opposed to human trafficking and the decriminalization of sex work. While serving in the legislature, Kerner sponsored HB 7005, which aimed to "stem prostitution and human sex trafficking" in the state's massage parlors, which are being used in some instances as fronts for illegal activity, by making it "a first degree misdemeanor for a person to operate a massage establishment between the hours of midnight and 5 a.m. and to use the massage business as a domicile."

Kerner was able to maneuver House Bill 369 through both the Florida House of Representatives and the Florida Senate four times in one session during the 2015 legislative session. The law (HB 369), aimed at raising awareness about human trafficking, mandates National Human Trafficking Hotline signs to be posted in a wide range of places, including rest areas, turnpike service plazas, weigh stations, welcome centers, airports and strip clubs. The legislation was co-sponsored by Republican Senator Jack Latvala.

He also authored legislation with State Senator Joseph Abruzzo that would "sever the parental rights of a rapist if a child is conceived as a result of the attack."

In addition, he also sponsored the "Timely Justice Act," which speeds up executions for inmates on death row. Specifically, the law requires the governor to sign a death warrant for a defendant within 30 days of a review of a capital conviction by the State Supreme Court, and the state is required carry out the execution within 180 days of the warrant.

Kerner was re-elected to his second term in the legislature in 2014 without opposition.

== National Rifle Association opposition and controversy ==
Kerner was a vocal opponent of pieces of legislation supported by the National Rifle Association of America (NRA).

During the 2016 legislative session, Kerner was an opponent of House Bill 163, an NRA-backed piece of legislation which would have imposed certain penalties on the State Attorney for "Stand Your Ground"-related prosecution.

Kerner sponsored two late amendments to House Bill 163 in the Criminal Justice Subcommittee. Both amendments were adopted and the bill was then killed on another vote shortly thereafter.

Following the killing of the bill, the National Rifle Association publicly condemned the actions of the legislators involved, and began an email campaign against those involved. Kerner was later named "Winner of the Week" by the Tampa Tribune for his successful efforts in helping to kill the bill.
