= Bill Hager (Florida politician) =

American politician (1947–2021)

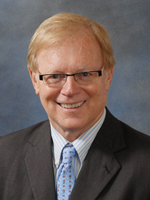
- Official portrait, 2013

Member of the Florida House of Representatives
- In office November 2, 2010 – November 6, 2018
- Preceded by: Adam Hasner
- Succeeded by: Mike Caruso
- Constituency: 87th district (2010–2012); 89th district (2012–2018)

Insurance Commissioner of Iowa
- In office July 1, 1986 – May 29, 1990
- Governor: Terry Branstad
- Preceded by: Fred M. Haskins
- Succeeded by: David J. Lyons

Personal details
- Born: February 6, 1947 Pipestone, Minnesota
- Died: October 13, 2021 (aged 74) Fargo, North Dakota
- Party: Republican
- Spouse: Martha Araújo Hager
- Children: Mackenzie and Madison
- Education: University of Northern Iowa (BA); University of Hawaiʻi (MEd); University of Illinois at Urbana-Champaign (JD)
- Profession: Attorney

Bill Hager (February 6, 1947 – October 13, 2021) was an American politician from Florida. He served four terms in the Florida House of Representatives as a Republican, representing parts of coastal Palm Beach County from 2010 to 2018.

== Biography ==
Hager was born in Pipestone, Minnesota. He later moved to Iowa, where he attended the University of Northern Iowa, graduating with a bachelor's degree in mathematics. He then moved to Hawaii, where he worked as a middle school math teacher, and attended the University of Hawaiʻi, receiving his Master of Education in educational psychology in 1972. Hager then attended the University of Illinois College of Law, graduating with his Juris Doctor in 1974.

He moved back to Iowa, where he worked as legal counsel to the Republican caucus in the Iowa House of Representatives in 1975. Hager then worked as an Assistant Attorney General, and then as the state's Deputy Insurance Commissioner. He took a job working as chief of staff to United States Congressman Tom Tauke from 1979 to 1980, and then returned to his work in insurance, serving as the Insurance Commissioner of Iowa from 1986 to 1990. During his service as Insurance Commissioner, he was elected to the West Des Moines School Board.

Hager then moved to the Florida in 1990. He was elected to the Boca Raton City Council in 2002, and served as the city's Deputy Mayor from 2004 to 2005.

== Florida House of Representatives ==
When incumbent State Representative Adam Hasner was unable to seek re-election in 2010 due to term limits, Hager ran to succeed him in the 87th District, which stretched from Hypoluxo to Deerfield Beach in Broward County and Palm Beach County. He won the Republican primary uncontested and faced Hava Holzhauer, an assistant states attorney in the general election. The Palm Beach Post endorsed Hager over Holzhauer, calling him "the better candidate" despite his "near-obsessive focus on support for an Arizona-style immigration law in Florida" due to his other positions and Holzhauer's limited knowledge of the issues.

In 2012, when the state's legislative districts were redrawn, Hager was moved into the 89th District, which included most of the territory that he had previously represented in the 87th District. He faced an unexpectedly strong challenge in Tom Gustafson, the Democratic nominee and a former State Representative who served as Speaker of the Florida House of Representatives from 1988 to 1990. Gustafson replaced Pamela Goodman, the previous nominee, after she withdrew due to her husband's deteriorating health.

He attacked Hager for being "a shill to the insurance industry," and a "puppet" for his party, noting, "Bill Hager hasn't had an original thought in his mind since he left Iowa." The Sun-Sentinel praised both candidates as "highly qualified," but, "in a tough decision," endorsed Hager, praising him as "a knowledgeable, open and accessible lawmaker." Ultimately, Hager narrowly defeated Gustafson to earn his second term in the legislature, receiving 53% of the vote to Gustafson's 47%.

He died of lung disease on October 13, 2021, in Fargo, North Dakota, at age 74.

Florida House of Representatives
Preceded by Adam Hasner	Member of the Florida House of Representatives from the 87th district 2010–2012	Succeeded by Dave Kerner
Preceded by Jeff Clemens	Member of the Florida House of Representatives from the 89th district 2012–2018	Succeeded by Mike Caruso
