= Irving Slosberg =

American politician

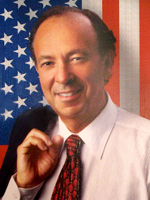

Member of the Florida House of Representatives from the 91st district
- In office November 6, 2012 – November 8, 2016
- Preceded by: George Moraitis
- Succeeded by: Emily Slosberg

Member of the Florida House of Representatives from the 90th district
- In office November 2, 2010 – November 6, 2012
- Preceded by: Kelly Skidmore
- Succeeded by: Lori Berman
- In office November 5, 2002 – November 7, 2006
- Preceded by: Mark Weissman
- Succeeded by: Kelly Skidmore

Member of the Florida House of Representatives from the 89th district
- In office November 7, 2000 – November 5, 2002
- Preceded by: Curt Levine
- Succeeded by: Mary Brandenburg

Personal details
- Born: August 26, 1947 (age 79) Chicago, Illinois
- Party: Democratic
- Education: Roosevelt University (B.S.)
- Profession: Journalist

Irving Slosberg (born August 26, 1947) is a former Democratic member of the Florida House of Representatives, representing the 91st District, which stretches from Boynton Beach to Boca Raton in southeastern Palm Beach County, from 2012 to 2016. Slosberg ran for state Senate twice: In 2006, when he lost a bid to the state Senate in the Democratic primary, and in 2016, when he again lost a bid to the state Senate in the Democratic primary, only earning 32% of the vote. He represented the 89th District from 2000 to 2002 and the 90th District from 2002 to 2006 and from 2010 to 2012. Slosberg returned to run for the State Senate again, this time for District 29 being vacated by Kevin Rader, Slosberg lost to incumbent representative Tina Polsky in the primary.

== History ==
Slosberg was born in Chicago, Illinois and attended Roosevelt University there, where he graduated with a degree in business administration in 1970. After graduating, he started the Slosberg Report from Israel, a journalism program. He moved to the state of Florida in 1979.

== Florida Senate ==
Slosberg ran for the Florida Senate in 2016. He lost to incumbent Jeff Clemens in the Democratic primary after spending $1.9 million of his own money on the race.

After Clemens resigned following an extramarital affair with a lobbyist coming to light, Slosberg entered the special election race to fill the now-vacant District 31 seat and is running against Democrat Lori Berman in the primary.

== Florida House of Representatives ==
In 2000, Slosberg challenged one-term incumbent State Representative Curt Levine in the Democratic primary in the 89th District, which included parts of Palm Beach County, along with Bobra Bush and Marc Shepard. In the end, Slosberg narrowly edged out Levine, winning 39% of the vote and coming in first over Levine by a mere 38 votes out of over ten thousand cast. However, because no candidate received a majority of the vote, a runoff primary election was held. In another closely fought election, Slosberg defeated Levine, receiving 50.5% of the vote and winning by 82 votes. He was elected in the general election without opposition.

Following the 2000 census, legislative districts were redrawn, and Slosberg ran for a second term in the 90th District, which included most of the territory he previously represented, but added some parts of northern Broward County. He was renominated by his party, and in the general election, faced only Libertarian candidate Susan Lipschutz, whom he defeated in a landslide, winning 84% of the vote. Slosberg was re-elected without opposition in 2004.

When incumbent Democratic State Senator Ron Klein opted to run for Congress against Congressman Clay Shaw in 2006, Slosberg ran in the primary to succeed him rather than seeking re-election to his House seat. However, Slosberg was defeated in the primary by Ted Deutch, who would later go on to win the general election in a landslide, despite spending $2.9 million of his own money on the race.

Slosberg's successor in the House, fellow Democrat Kelly Skidmore, declined to seek a third term in 2010, instead opting to run for the Florida Senate against Republican Ellyn Setnor Bogdanoff, so Slosberg ran to succeed his successor. He won the nomination of the Democratic Party easily, defeating Sheldon Klasfeld. In the general election, he defeated Alison Rampersad, the Republican nominee, winning 64% of the vote to once again return to the legislature.

In 2012, the Florida House districts were redrawn once again, and Slosberg opted to run for re-election in the 91st District, which removed the sections of Broward County in exchange for a deeper incursion into Palm Beach County. He was elected without opposition both in the primary and the general election. He was re-elected to his third consecutive term in the legislature, and sixth overall, in 2014 without opposition.

== Legislation ==
While in the legislature, Slosberg sponsored legislation that would "restrict drivers of commercial motor vehicles traveling interstate highways from talking or texting on hand-held phones while driving," and opposed legislation that would expand virtual education programs in Florida public schools, noting, "I don't think this is about embracing technology. I think this is about embracing money. It's not going to benefit our children. It's probably going to benefit for-profit companies and out-of-state schemers." In 2019 Florida Virtual School's former General Counsel Frank Kruppenbacher resigned amid accusations of improper behavior and spending. Gov. Ron DeSantis and lawmakers then ordered a state takeover of Florida's public online school.

Slosberg also voted in line with legislation in 2011 and 2014 containing pro-gun language, and in favor of the Republican redistricting plan in 2002 that increased GOP control of the House.

== Voting machine controversy ==
Immediately after the 2000 election in which Slosberg was elected to the Florida State House by 88 votes, and at the peak of the vote recount during the Bush-Gore United States presidential election in Florida, 2000, Palm Beach Sheriff's Deputies confiscated a Votamatic voting machine from Slosberg. When initially approached by the Supervisor of Elections Office and asked about the voting machine, Slosberg denied having it. On November 11, 2000, police confronted Slosberg about the voting machine which Slosberg then retrieved from his car and delivered to the police. No reason was ever provided for Slosberg having possession of the voting machine, and despite additional allegations of misconduct, Democrat Supervisor of Elections Theresa Lepore neither investigated nor pressed charges against Slosberg.

== The Dori Slosberg Foundation ==
The Dori Slosberg Highway Safety Foundation is a non-governmental, not for profit, 501(c)3 public service organization dedicated to traffic safety. The foundation is named in memory of the daughter of Irving Slosberg, who was killed in a car crash. The Dori Slosberg Foundation has been instrumental in promoting highway safety in Florida though programs including Staying Alive on 95 and Survive the Drive. It was led by Emily Slosberg. In 2009, the Dori Slosberg Foundation helped pass the Dori Slosberg and Katie Marchetti Safety Belt Law, which gives police the authority to pull over drivers solely for not wearing a seatbelt.
