= Joseph Titone =

Joseph Titone may refer to:

- Joseph H. Titone
- Joseph F. Titone
