= Titon =

Titon is a surname. Notable people with the surname include:

- Évrard Titon du Tillet (1677 – 1762), French historian and biographer
- Jeff Todd Titon (born 1943), professor of music and author
- Khandaker Naim Ahmed Titon, Bangladeshi gangster based in Dhaka
- Marcão (footballer, born 1976), full name Marcos Aurélio Titon, Brazilian footballer

== See also ==
- Titone
