= Connie Mack IV =

American politician (born 1967)

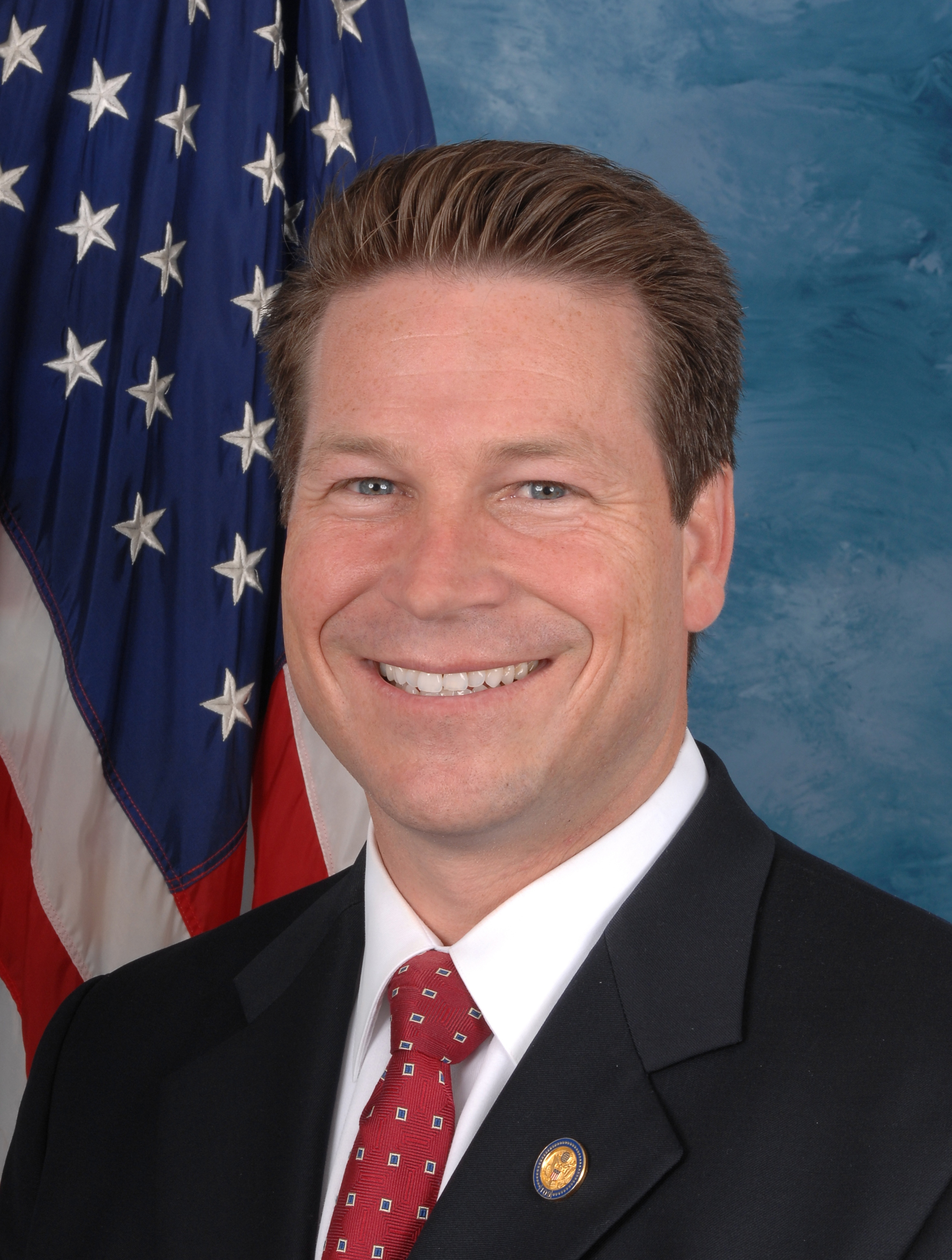

Member of the U.S. House of Representatives from Florida's 14th district
- In office January 3, 2005 – January 3, 2013
- Preceded by: Porter Goss
- Succeeded by: Trey Radel (redistricted)

Member of the Florida House of Representatives from the 91st district
- In office November 7, 2000 – October 10, 2003
- Preceded by: Debby Sanderson
- Succeeded by: Ellyn Setnor Bogdanoff

Personal details
- Born: Cornelius Harvey McGillicuddy IV; August 12, 1967 (age 59) Fort Myers, Florida, U.S.
- Party: Republican
- Spouses: Ann Galuzzo (m. 1996; div. 2006); Mary Bono (m. 2007; div. 2013); Jennifer Key (m. 2018)
- Children: 3
- Parent: Connie Mack III (father)
- Relatives: John Levi Sheppard (great-great-grandfather); Morris Sheppard (great-grandfather); Connie Mack (great-grandfather); Earle Mack (granduncle); Roy Mack (granduncle)
- Education: Santa Fe College; University of Florida (BA)

Cornelius Harvey McGillicuddy IV (born August 12, 1967), known popularly as Connie Mack IV, is an American politician and lobbyist. He is the former U.S. representative for Florida's 14th congressional district, serving from 2005 to 2013. A Republican, he ran for the U.S. Senate in 2012, losing to Democrat Bill Nelson. He is the son of former Republican U.S. Senator Connie Mack III and the great-grandson of baseball manager Connie Mack.

== Early life, education, and family ==
Mack was born in Fort Myers, Florida, the son of former U.S. Senator Connie Mack III and cancer prevention advocate Ludie Priscilla (née Hobbs). His father represented the district from 1983 to 1989 (when it was numbered as the 13th District), before serving two terms in the U.S. Senate.

Through his father, Mack is the great-grandson of Cornelius McGillicuddy ("Connie Mack"), the manager and owner of baseball's Philadelphia Athletics and member of the Baseball Hall of Fame; the great-grandson of Morris Sheppard, U.S. Senator and Representative from Texas; and the great-great-grandson of John Levi Sheppard, a U.S. Representative from Texas.

In June 1988, Mack earned his Associate of Arts from Santa Fe Community College and In 1993, Mack earned his Bachelor of Arts from the University of Florida. After college, Mack became a marketing executive, working as a consultant to promote the restaurant chain Hooters.

== Florida House of Representatives ==
In 2000, incumbent Republican State Representative Debby Sanderson decided to retire to run for a seat in the Florida Senate. Mack decided to run for the open seat in the Fort Lauderdale–based 91st House District. He defeated Democratic nominee Kevin Rader 56%–44%. In 2002, he won re-election with 79% of the vote.

Mack was Chairman of the Committee on State Administration, and in his second term he became the Deputy Majority Leader.

== U.S. House of Representatives ==
=== Elections ===
In 2003, incumbent Republican Congressman Porter Goss announced his intention to retire in order to serve as Director of the CIA. That October, Mack resigned from the Florida Legislature and moved back to his hometown of Fort Myers to run for his father's old seat. Had he not resigned his state house seat, he would have been unable to vote for himself in the primary or general election in the 14th District, as the Florida Constitution requires state legislators to be residents of the district they represent. Mack stated, "The people of the 14th District deserve to be represented in Washington by someone who shares our mainstream conservative Republican values in the mold of my father and Congressman Porter Goss". He narrowly won a four-way Republican primary—the real contest in this heavily Republican district—with a plurality of 36% of the vote, defeating more experienced challengers State Representative Carole Green and Lee County Commissioner Andy Coy. He won the general election with 68% of the vote.

Mack consistently won re-election without serious difficulty, with his closest bid in 2008, when he won 59% in a three-way election.

=== Tenure ===
Mack is a vocal supporter of cutting federal spending and lower taxes. He is a signer of the Taxpayer Protection Pledge. Additionally, he is a co-sponsor of a constitutional amendment to require a balanced federal budget and was one of the most outspoken opponents of federal bailouts. Mack has also been a prominent advocate for greater congressional oversight of government surveillance. He voted against George W. Bush's domestic eavesdropping program in 2006 and Foreign Intelligence Surveillance Act Reform in 2007.

Mack was an outspoken critic of late Venezuelan President Hugo Chávez, as well as one of the most vocal opponents of the Latin American television network teleSUR. He is also a member of the Congressional Cuba Democracy Caucus. As a member of the Transportation and Infrastructure Committee, Mack helped secure over $81 million to expand Interstate 75 in Southwest Florida, a project of significant concern to the region.

Unlike many members of Congress, Mack has been a vigorous and outspoken defender of the whistle-blowing website WikiLeaks.

=== Committee assignments ===
- Committee on Foreign Affairs
  - Subcommittee on the Middle East and South Asia
  - Subcommittee on the Western Hemisphere (Chair)
- Committee on Oversight and Government Reform
  - Subcommittee on Federal Workforce, U.S. Postal Service and Labor Policy
  - Subcommittee on Government Organization, Efficiency and Financial Management (Vice Chair)
  - Subcommittee on Regulatory Affairs, Stimulus Oversight and Government Spending

== 2012 U.S. Senate election ==
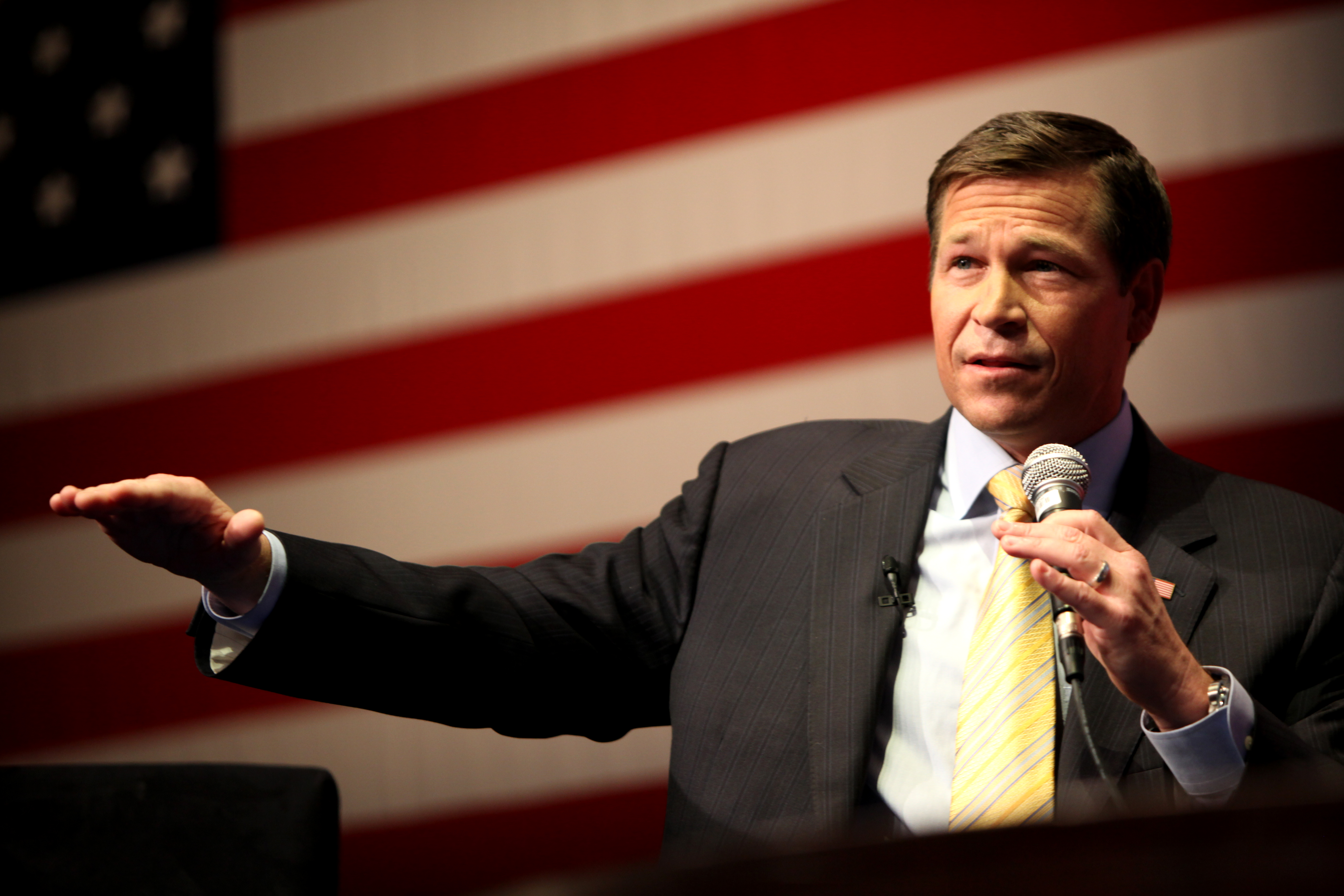
Mack speaking to a conservative group in February 2012.

Early in the election cycle, Mack was considered a potential candidate against incumbent Democratic Senator Bill Nelson in the 2012 Senate election. However, he declined to run on March 25, 2011, citing family and his work in the House of Representatives. On October 26, 2011, it was announced Mack had changed his mind and that he would seek the Republican nomination because he felt no one in the current field was able to defeat Nelson. His opponent in the primary was former Representative Dave Weldon, whom Mack defeated, winning 58% of the vote. Mack then lost to Nelson by over one million votes.

== Electoral history ==
Florida's 14th Congressional District Election (2004)
Party	Candidate	Votes	%
Republican	Connie Mack IV	226,662	67.59
Democratic	Robert M. Neeld	108,672	32.41
Total votes		335,334	100.00
Turnout			
Republican hold			

Florida's 14th Congressional District Election (2006)
Party	Candidate	Votes	%
Republican	Connie Mack IV*	151,615	64.37
Democratic	Robert M. Neeld	83,920	35.63
Total votes		235,535	100.00
Turnout			
Republican hold			

Florida's 14th Congressional District Election (2008)
Party	Candidate	Votes	%
Republican	Connie Mack IV*	224,602	59.44
Democratic	Robert M. Neeld	93,590	24.77
Independent	Burt Saunders	54,750	14.49
Independent	Jeff George	4,949	1.31
Total votes		377,891	100.00
Turnout			
Republican hold			

Florida's 14th Congressional District Election (2010)
Party	Candidate	Votes	%
Republican	Connie Mack IV*	188,341	68.57
Democratic	James Lloyd Roach	74,525	27.13
Independent	William Maverick St. Claire	11,825	4.31
Total votes		274,691	100.00
Turnout			
Republican hold			

2012 U.S. Senate, Republican primary results
Party	Candidate	Votes	%
Republican	Connie Mack IV	657,331	58.7
Republican	Dave Weldon	226,083	20.2
Republican	Mike McCalister	155,421	13.9
Republican	Marielena Stuart	81,808	7.3
Total votes		1,120,643	100.0

United States Senate election in Florida, 2012
Party	Candidate	Votes	%	±%
Democratic	Bill Nelson (incumbent)	4,523,451	55.23%	−5.07%
Republican	Connie Mack IV	3,458,267	42.23%	+4.13%
Independent	Bill Gaylor	126,079	1.54%	N/A
Independent	Chris Borgia	82,089	1.00%	N/A
Write-in		60	0.0	N/A
Total votes		8,189,946	100.00%	N/A
Democratic hold				

== Post-congressional career ==
In 2013, Mack was hired as a partner at lobbying firm Liberty Partners Group, where his father was a chairman emeritus. Following his unsuccessful bid for the Senate, Mack founded two lobbying and consulting firms, Mack Strategies and Liberty International Group. In March 2014, he registered to become a lobbyist for American Task Force Argentina. As of September 2014, he was an executive vice president of public relations firm Levick as well as a registered lobbyist for Levick, Doral Financial and Las Vegas Sands. Mack considered entering Florida's 19th congressional district special election in 2014 to replace Trey Radel but, in January 2014, officially declined to enter the race.

=== International lobbying ===
Mack has also worked extensively as a lobbyist for the government of Hungary. In December 2020, Mack joined Platinum Advisors DC to lobby in support of increased humanitarian assistance to Ethiopia. In 2017, he was accused of holding a "sham hearing" in the U.S. Capitol on behalf of a Ukrainian television studio.

== Personal life ==
In 1992, Mack was involved in a bar fight with professional baseball player Ron Gant in Georgia. Mack suffered a broken ankle in the fight but a jury ultimately found that Gant was not liable for Mack's injuries.

Mack and Ann Galluzzo were married in 1996 and divorced in 2006. They have a son named Connie Mack V and a daughter named Addison Mack.

In 2007, while representing his Florida district in the U.S. House of Representatives, Mack married then-U.S. Representative from California Mary Bono (R-CA), former wife of Glenn Baxley and widow of Sonny Bono. They were the third married couple to serve in the House of Representatives simultaneously. Mack and Bono divorced in 2013. He married Jennifer Key, an international development expert, in 2018. They have a son named William Arthur McGillicuddy.

U.S. House of Representatives
Preceded by Porter Goss	Member of the U.S. House of Representatives from Florida's 14th congressional district 2005–2013	Succeeded by Kathy Castor
Party political offices
Preceded by Katherine Harris	Republican nominee for U.S. Senator from Florida (Class 1); 2012	Succeeded by Rick Scott
U.S. order of precedence (ceremonial)
Preceded by Kendrick Meek as Former U.S. Representative	Order of precedence of the United States as Former U.S. Representative	Succeeded by Dennis Ross as Former U.S. Representative
