= Emily Slosberg =

American politician

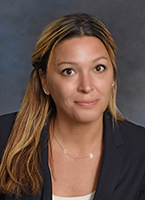

Member of the Florida House of Representatives from the 91st district
- In office November 8, 2016 – November 8, 2022
- Preceded by: Irving Slosberg
- Succeeded by: Peggy Gossett-Seidman

Personal details
- Born: September 1
- Party: Democratic
- Education: Florida Atlantic University (BA); Nova Southeastern University (JD)

Emily Slosberg is an American politician who represented the Boca Raton area in the Florida House of Representatives from 2016 through 2022 and is a member of the Florida Democratic Party. She ran in 2016 succeeding her father Irving Slosberg. She introduced a bill in 2018 to make it an offense to leave a young child in a car for more than 15 minutes.
