= Kelly Skidmore =

American politician

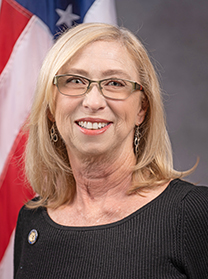

Member of the Florida House of Representatives
- Incumbent
- Assumed office November 3, 2020
- Preceded by: Tina Polsky
- Constituency: 81st district (2020–2022); 92nd district (2022–present)
- In office November 21, 2006 – November 16, 2010
- Preceded by: Irving Slosberg
- Succeeded by: Irving Slosberg
- Constituency: 90th district

Personal details
- Born: December 20, 1962 (age 63) Cleveland, Ohio, U.S.
- Party: Democratic
- Spouse: Ray Skidmore
- Children: 1
- Profession: Legislative aide, advocate

Kelly Palmer Skidmore (born December 20, 1962) is a politician who serves as a member of the Florida House of Representatives. She represented the 90th District from 2006 to 2008. A Democrat, she ran unsuccessfully for the Florida Senate in 2010 and again for the Florida House in 2016. In 2024, she ran unopposed as the incumbent. She represents the Boca Raton area.

== Early life and career ==
Skidmore was born in Cleveland, Ohio, and moved to the state of Florida in 1972, where she attended Deerfield Beach High School. She worked as a legislative aide to then-State Senator Ron Klein from 1996 to 2005, and then served as the vice-president of Advocacy and Public Policy for the Florida Chapter of the Arthritis Foundation. She is married to Ray Skidmore and they have a daughter.

== Florida House of Representatives ==
In 2006, State Representative Irving Slosberg opted to run for the Florida Senate rather than seek re-election. Skidmore ran to succeed Slosberg in the 90th District, which included Deerfield Beach and Delray Beach in western Broward County and Palm Beach County. She faced Len Turesky, Sheldon Klasfield, and Harvey Arnold in the Democratic primary, and was endorsed by the AFL-CIO and by former United States Attorney General Janet Reno. During the campaign, Skidmore campaigned on her legislative experience working as Klein's aide, though she was attacked by Turesky for exaggerating her role in Klein's office. Ultimately, Skidmore emerged narrowly victorious in the crowded field, winning 29% of the vote to Turesky's 28%, Klasfield's 22%, and Arnold's 21%. She was unopposed in the general election.

In 2008, Slosberg opened a campaign account to reclaim his old seat and challenge Skidmore in the Democratic primary, but ultimately declined to do so. Consequently, Skidmore was elected to her second term uncontested.

During her tenure in the legislature, Skidmore worked to combat abuses in the state's pain clinics, successfully sponsoring legislation with fellow State Representative Kurt Kelly to create a statewide database for pain medicine prescriptions. In 2010, she proposed banning convicted felons from owning and operating pain clinics and placing limits on the quantity of prescription painkillers that physicians would be allowed to prescribe.

== 2010 Florida Senate campaign ==
Incumbent State Senator Jeff Atwater was unable to seek re-election in 2010 due to term limits, so Skidmore ran to succeed him in the 25th District, which stretched from West Palm Beach to Fort Lauderdale in Broward County and Palm Beach County. She won the Democratic primary unopposed, and advanced to the general election, where she faced Republican State Representative Ellyn Setnor Bogdanoff and independent candidate Miranda Rosenberg. Skidmore campaigned on her support for liberal social policies, including her opposition to additional restrictions on abortion and her support for ending the state's gay adoption ban. The Florida Democratic Party invested heavily on behalf of Skidmore's campaign, aiming to win the seat to prevent Senate Republicans from winning a two-thirds majority in the chamber. The Sun-Sentinel, though praising both Bogdanoff and Skidmore as "seasoned, accomplished veterans of the Florida Legislature," endorsed Bogdanoff, suggesting that her leadership role among Republican legislators would benefit the district. Ultimately, despite the fact that Barack Obama narrowly won the district in 2008, Skidmore was defeated by a wide margin, winning 38% of the vote to Bogdanoff's 58% and Rosenberg's 5%.

== After the State House ==
After losing the 2010 election and retiring from the Florida House, Skidmore was named the executive director of Broward Days, an organization of government and business leaders who lobby the Florida Legislature for Broward County-friendly legislation. Following State Representative Irving Slosberg's decision to run for the Florida Senate rather than seek re-election, Skidmore ran to replace him in the 90th District. She faced Slosberg's daughter, attorney Emily Slosberg, in the Democratic primary.

Skidmore campaigned on her legislative experience, which included working on a bipartisan effort to regulate pain clinics in South Florida. She emphasized the practical reality that Democrats were at a "severe minority" in the Florida House, but nonetheless argued that she would help fight against Republican efforts to restrict access to abortion. Skidmore also campaigned on making Florida "a global marine research hub," expanding healthcare for impoverished Floridians, and "develop[ing] educational programs that would better match the needs of Florida's businesses." Ultimately, the Sun-Sentinel endorsed her campaign, calling the choice between Skidmore and Slosberg "easy" and noting that "Skidmore has a much stronger grasp of the issues facing Florida and an admirable understanding of how politics works in Tallahassee." However, Slosberg ended up narrowly beating Skidmore, 52-48%, a difference of just 600 votes.

Florida House of Representatives
Preceded by Irving Slosberg	Member of the Florida House of Representatives from the 90th district 2006–2010	Succeeded by Irving Slosberg
Preceded by Tina Polsky	Member of the Florida House of Representatives from the 81st district 2020–present	Incumbent
