= Titone =

Titone is an Italian surname. Notable people with the surname include:

- Brianna Titone, American politician
- Mario Titone (born 1988), Italian footballer
- Matthew Titone, American politician
- Jackie Sandler née Titone, American actress and model
- Joseph F. Titone, American politician from New Hampshire
- Joseph H. Titone (born 1946), American politician from Florida
- Claudio Titone, notable Italian Installation Coordinator which has led successful offshore campaigns all around the globe

== See also ==
- Tithonus, from Greek mythology, known in Italian as Titone
