= Barry Silver =

American politician (1956–2024)

Member of the Florida House of Representatives from the 89th district
- In office November 5, 1996 – November 3, 1998
- Preceded by: Ron Klein
- Succeeded by: Curt Levine

Personal details
- Born: November 18, 1956 Mount Vernon, New York, U.S.
- Died: March 21, 2024 (aged 67)
- Party: Democratic
- Education: Florida Atlantic University, B.A., 1980; Shepard Broad Law Center 1983, J.D., 1983
- Occupation: Attorney

Rabbi Barry Silver (November 18, 1956 – March 21, 2024) was an American attorney and politician in Florida who served as a member of the Florida House of Representatives.

== Early life and education ==
Barry Silver was born to Elaine and Samuel Silver in Mount Vernon, New York, on November 18, 1956.

Silver graduated with honors from Florida Atlantic University in 1979, and received his juris doctor from Nova University in 1983.

== Career ==
Silver was granted admission to The Florida Bar in 1983.

Silver came in first in the primary election held on September 2, 1996, to replace Ron Klein in Florida House of Representatives District 89. In October, Silver won the Democratic nomination for the runoff election over Glenn Wichinsky. Because there was no Republican opposition, by winning the runoff, Silver essentially won the District 89 Seat.

In June 2022, Silver filed a lawsuit against a Florida law banning abortions after 15 weeks, on the grounds that the law infringed on the constitution's right to freedom of religion, among other legal entitlements.

Silver led Congregation L'Dor Va-Dor in Palm Beach County from 1996, where he championed the cause of "Cosmic Judaism", a hyperrationalist, post-denominational approach to Jewish life and practice that emphasized the integration of science and religion, among other values.

== Death ==
Silver died from colon cancer on March 21, 2024, at the age of 67.

== Sources ==
- Florida House of Representatives archived Profile

Political offices
Preceded by Ron Klein	Florida House of Representatives; District 89; 1996–1998	Succeeded by Curt Levine
