= Florida's 92nd House of Representatives district =

Florida district

Florida's 92nd State House of Representatives district
Representative
Kelly Skidmore; D–Boca Raton

Florida's 92nd House of Representatives district elects one member of the Florida House of Representatives. It contains parts of Palm Beach County.

== Members ==
- Kelly Skidmore (since 2022)
