= Broad and Cassel =

Broad and Cassel LLP
- Headquarters: Orlando, Florida, US
- No. of offices: 10 total
- No. of attorneys: 170
- Key people: David Brown, chairman
- Date founded: January 1, 1946
- Founder: Shepard Broad, Alvin Cassel
- Company type: Partnership
- Website: www.broadandcassel.com

Broad and Cassel LLP is a law firm with ten offices located throughout the State of Florida.

The firm was founded by Alvin Cassel and Shepard Broad in 1946. U.S. Senator Marco Rubio and U.S. Representatives Kathy Castor and Ted Deutch have been affiliated with the firm.

Lewis Horwitz joined the firm as a partner in 1948 to handle litigation. The three of them remained together at Broad and Cassel for more than 30 years. In 1968, Norman Broad, Shepard's nephew, became managing partner.

Broad and Cassel LLP and Nelson Mullins Riley & Scarborough LLP combined into a super-regional law firm on August 1, 2018, in Florida, known as Nelson Mullins Broad and Cassel. The combined firm has more than 750 attorneys and professionals operating in 25 offices across 11 states and Washington, D.C.
