= Tina Polsky =

American politician from Florida

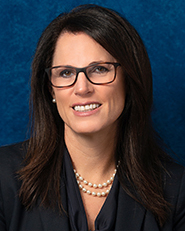

Member of the Florida Senate
- In office November 3, 2020 – November 3, 2026
- Preceded by: Kevin Rader
- Succeeded by: Lauren Book
- Constituency: 29th district (2020–2022); 30th district (2022–2026)

Member of the Florida House of Representatives from the 81st district
- In office November 6, 2018 – November 3, 2020
- Preceded by: Joseph Abruzzo
- Succeeded by: Kelly Skidmore

Personal details
- Born: May 4, 1968 (age 58) Merrick, New York, U.S.
- Party: Democratic
- Spouse: Jeff Polsky
- Education: University of Pennsylvania (BA); Columbia University (JD)

Tina Scott Polsky (born May 4, 1968) is an American politician who served as a Democratic Party member of the Florida Senate, representing the 29th district (2020–2022) and 30th district (2024–2026). Her Senate district included parts of southern Palm Beach and northern Broward counties. Polsky served one term in the Florida House of Representatives, representing parts of western and southern Palm Beach County from 2018 to 2020.

== Electoral history ==
In 2018, Polsky was elected without opposition to Florida House District 81. After Senator Kevin Rader announced he would retire in 2020, Polsky ran to succeed him. She defeated former State Representative Irving Slosberg in the Democratic primary, 69% to 31%. Polsky then beat her Republican opponent, Brian Norton, 56% to 44% to win election to the Florida Senate, District 29.

Florida Senate District 29 general election
Party	Candidate	Votes	%
Democrat	Tina Polsky	156,441	55.7%
Republican	Brian Norton	124,502	44.3%

Florida Senate District 29 primary election
Party	Candidate	Votes	%
Democrat	Tina Polsky	39,552	69.3%
Democrat	Irving "Irv" Slosberg	17,476	30.7%

Florida House of Representatives District 81 primary election
Party	Candidate	Votes	%
Democrat	Tina Polsky	13,394	62.0%
Democrat	Mindy Koch	8,199	38.0%

== Endorsements ==
During her 2020 election, Polsky was endorsed by the following organizations:

2020 endorsements
Advocacy organizations	Union organizations	Newspapers
Ruth's List Florida	Florida AFL-CIO	South Florida Sun-Sentinel
Moms Demand Action	Palm Beach Treasure Coast AFL-CIO	Palm Beach Post
WiNOW	AFSCME Florida	
Associated Builders and Contractors, Florida East Coast	Palm Beach County Classroom Teachers Association	
Florida Medical Association	SEIU Florida	
Emily's List	Broward Teachers Union	
Dolphin Democrats		
Palm Beach County Human Rights Council		
Equality Florida		
Florida College Democrats		
Ban Assault Weapons Now		
The Hispanic Vote		
Florida LGBTQ+ Democratic Caucus		
Hispanic Political Action Committee of Florida		
Sierra Club		
Florida Alliance of Planned Parenthood Affiliates		

== Legislation ==
In 2023, Polsky was the primary sponsor for SB 164 on controlled substance testing which passed unanimously through the Florida Legislature and was signed by the Governor. The bill decriminalized the use fentanyl testing strips. Polsky commented that she hoped the measure would "reduce the risk of overdose [by allowing] a person using drugs to make an educated decision about their personal safety.” Polsky was a co-sponsor in the Senate for CS/HB 389, "Menstrual Hygiene Products in Public Schools" which aimed to increase availability and accessibility of menstrual hygiene products in schools. Also in the 2023 Legislative Session, Polsky sponsored the Senate companion bill for CS/CS/HB 67, which expands the list of public employees protected from threats of serious bodily harm or death to include justices, judicial assistants, clerks of the circuit court, clerks of the circuit court personnel, and their family members. Additionally, the bill created a new first-degree misdemeanor offense in s. 836.12(3), F.S., to prohibit a person from knowingly and willfully harassing a law enforcement officer, a state attorney, an assistant state attorney, a firefighter, a judge, a justice, a judicial assistant, a clerk of the circuit court, clerk of the circuit court personnel, or an elected official, with the intent to intimidate or coerce such a person to perform or refrain from performing a lawful duty.

In 2022, Polsky co-sponsored SB 292, that requires hospitals or other state-licensed birthing facilities to administer and process a test on any newborn who fails an initial hearing test in order to screen for Congenital Cytomegalovirus (CMV). Polsky further co-sponsored the Senate companion bill to CS/CS/CS/HB 1421 "School Safety," which extended the sunset of the Marjory Stoneman Douglas High School Public Safety Commission to July 1, 2025, clarified the authority of the Commissioner of Education to enforce school safety regulations, and expanded school safety requirements. She also co-sponsored SB 528/HB 265, that increases the maximum value of a motor vehicle that may be exempted from legal process in a bankruptcy case from $1,000 to $5,000. She co-sponsored SB 968 that safeguarded retirement accounts by making sure that money in certain kinds of retirement accounts which is received by individuals after a divorce settlement remains exempt from creditor claims once the transfer is complete. The bill clarifies that any interest in an individual retirement account (IRA) or individual retirement annuity received in a transfer incident to divorce remains exempt from creditor claims after the transfer is complete. Polsky was also the Senate resolution sponsor for SR 1990, which condemned the military assault on Ukraine and its democracy.

In 2019, Polsky co-sponsored CS/HB 49, the "Dignity for Incarcerated Women Act." The bill requires the jails and prisons to provide certain hygiene products to women at no cost, including tampons. The bill also prohibits male correctional officers from conducting pat-down or body cavity searches on female inmates, among other prohibitions. She also co-sponsored CS/HB 563, which requires that individuals cannot be disqualified from receiving reemployment assistance if he or she leaves their job as a direct result of domestic violence. Polsky opposed the effort to repeal the Reedy Creek Improvement Act, arguing that Disney is being "attacked" for expressing support for its LGBTQ customers and employees, asking whether the decision to repeal the law and dissolve the Reedy Creek Improvement District is being made "based on spite."

Florida House of Representatives
Preceded by Joseph Abruzzo	Member of the Florida House of Representatives from the 81st district 2018–2020	Succeeded by Kelly Skidmore
Florida Senate
Preceded by Kevin Rader	Member of the Florida Senate from the 29th district 2020–present	Incumbent
