= Peggy Gossett-Seidman =

American Politician & Florida State Legislative Representative (District 91)

State Representative Peggy Gossett-Seidman
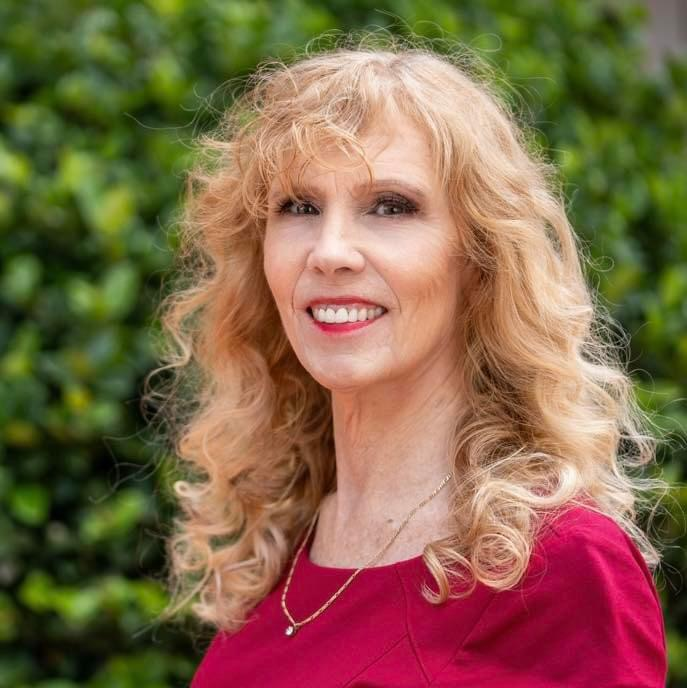

Member of the Florida House of Representatives from the House District 91 district
- Incumbent
- Assumed office November 8, 2022
- Preceded by: Emily Slosberg

Personal details
- Party: Republican
- Education: Michigan State University
- Occupation: Politician
- Website: PeggyForFL.com

Peggy Gossett-Seidman is an American politician. She is the Republican member for District 91 in the Florida House of Representatives.

She has a background as a journalist, reporter, and former Women's Tennis Association Press-Director. She has contributed to several legislative initiatives in Florida.

== Early life and career ==
Gossett-Seidman began her career as a sports journalist and later worked in public relations. She served as a press director for the Women's Tennis Association. She later served on the Highland Beach Town Commission from 2018 to 2022.

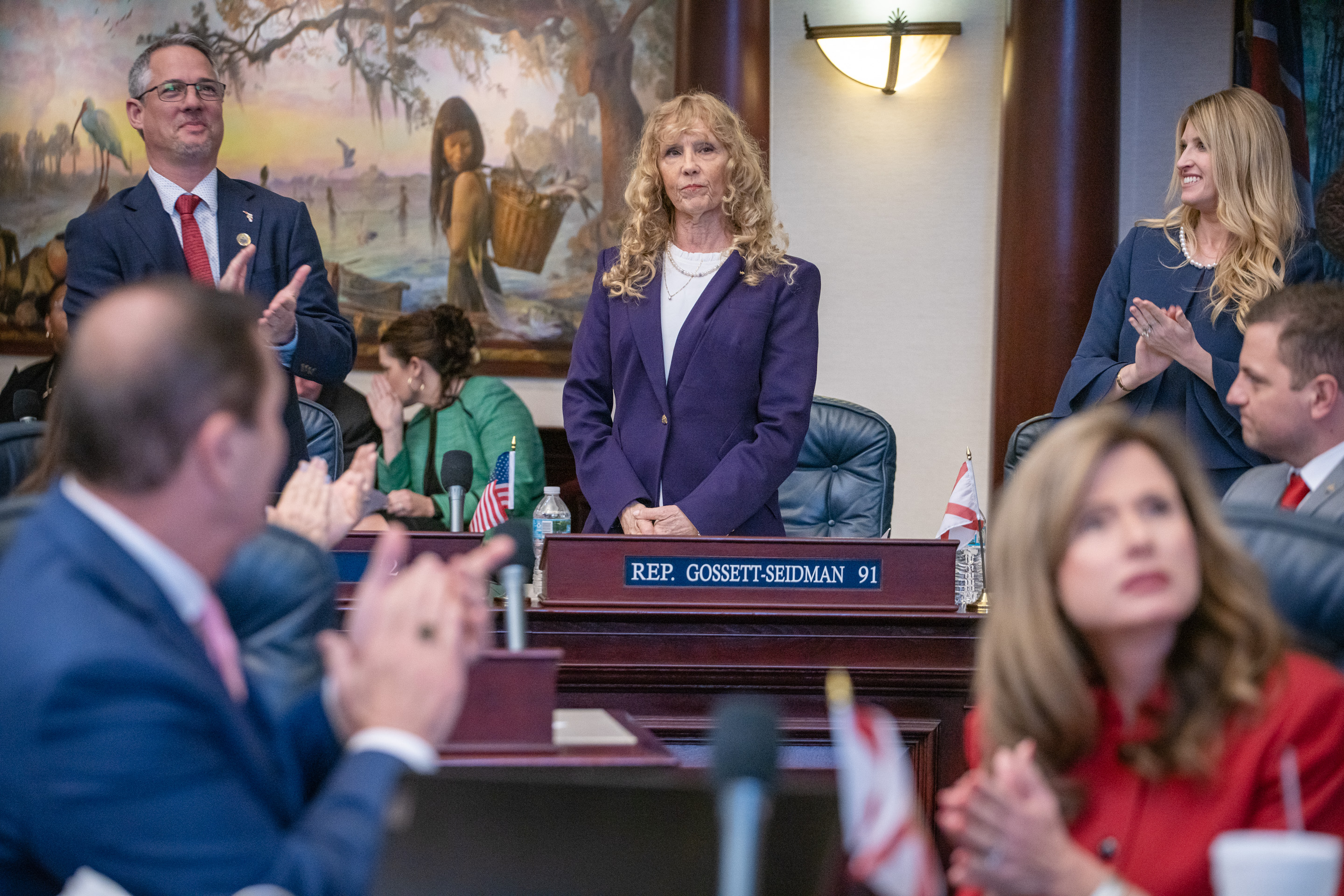
Standing Ovation for HB-117 Epstein Grand Jury Legislation Presentation

== Legislative Work ==
Gossett-Seidman's legislative work has focused on public safety, environmental protection, election law, consumer privacy, and water quality.

== 2023–2024 legislative session ==
=== 2023–2024 legislative session ===
During her first term, Gossett-Seidman sponsored and supported several pieces of legislation.

She sponsored CS/HB 117 (2024), which allows for the release of grand jury testimony related to the 2006 investigation into Jeffrey Epstein.

She also sponsored CS/HB 135 (2024), addressing voter registration safeguards and preventing unauthorized party affiliation changes.

Gossett-Seidman sponsored CS/HB 165 (2024), known as the Safe Waterways Act, establishing a statewide notification system for water contamination.

She also sponsored HB 523 (2024), establishing the Florida Seal of Fine Arts Program for high school students.

Additionally, she supported House Resolution 9-C (2023), expressing support for Israel and condemning terrorism, which was adopted unanimously.

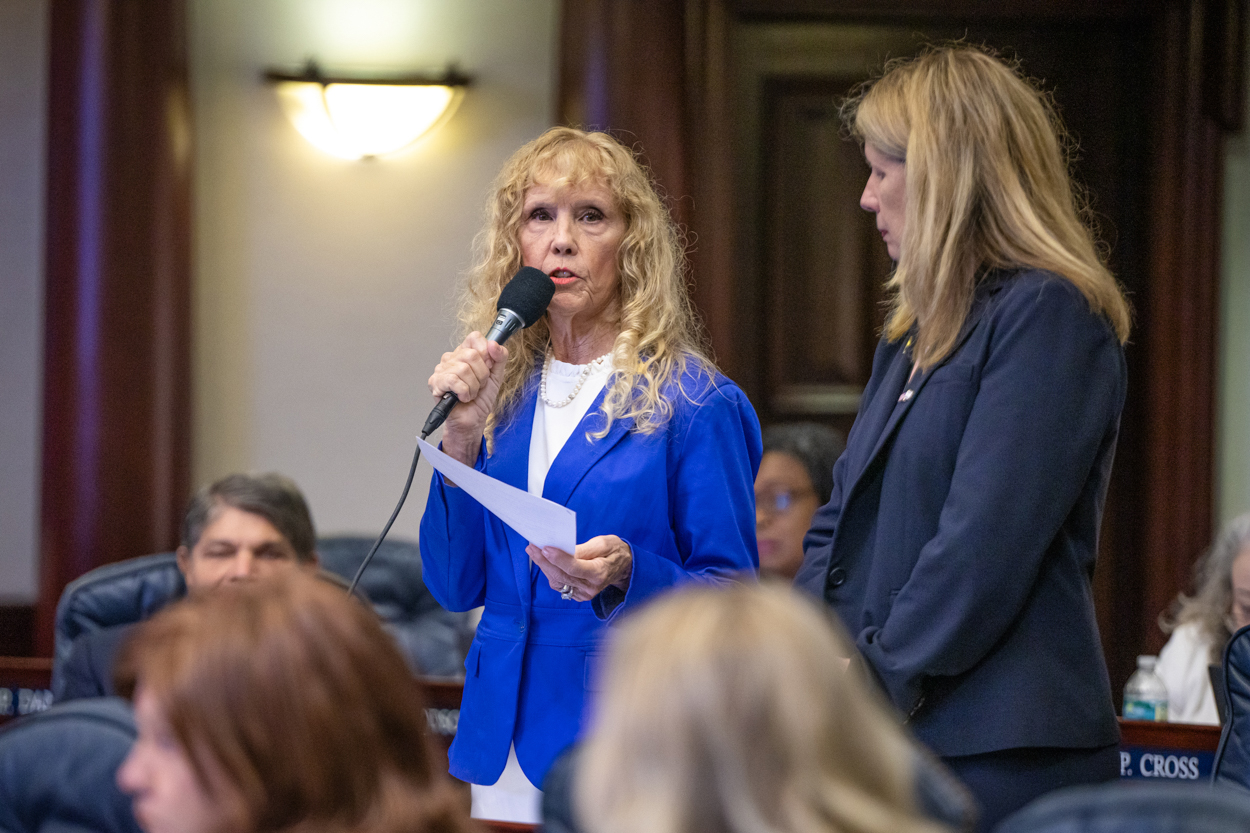
Legislative Presentation

=== 2024–2025 legislative activity ===
Gossett-Seidman continued her legislative work on environmental and consumer protection issues.

She co-sponsored the State Park Preservation Act (HB 209), which restricts development within Florida state parks.

She introduced the Motor Vehicle Operator Privacy Act (HB 357), which proposes restrictions on the sale and distribution of driver data collected by the state.

Gossett-Seidman co-sponsored CS/CS/HB 913 (2025), addressing governance and financial transparency requirements for condominium and homeowners’ associations.

== Environmental and consumer policy ==
Gossett-Seidman co-sponsored the State Park Preservation Act (HB 209), which restricts development within Florida state parks.

She introduced the Motor Vehicle Operator Privacy Act (HB 357), which proposes restrictions on the sale of driver data.

== Committee assignments ==
During her first legislative term, Gossett-Seidman served on several committees, including the Joint Legislative Auditing Committee, the Agriculture & Natural Resources Appropriations Subcommittee, the Children, Families & Seniors Subcommittee, the Energy, Communications & Cybersecurity Subcommittee, the Water Quality, Supply & Treatment Subcommittee, and the PreK–12 Appropriations Subcommittee, where she served as vice chair.

== Local government service ==
Prior to her election to the Florida House, Gossett-Seidman served on the Highland Beach Town Commission from 2018 to 2022, where she was involved in municipal infrastructure and public safety initiatives.
