= Benjamin Graber =

American politician

Member of the Florida House of Representatives from the 89th district
- In office 1988–1992
- Preceded by: Joseph H. Titone
- Succeeded by: Ron Klein

Member of the Florida House of Representatives from the 96th district
- In office 1992–1996
- Preceded by: Norman Ostrau
- Succeeded by: Stacy Ritter

Personal details
- Party: Democratic

Benjamin Graber is an American politician. He served as a Democratic member for the 89th and 96th district of the Florida House of Representatives.
