= Alvin Cassel =

American lawyer

Alvin Cassel (25 February 1914 – 8 August 2000) was an American lawyer in South Florida who cofounded the firm Broad and Cassel. A native of Miami, Florida, he attended the University of Florida as an undergraduate where he was a member of the Pi Lambda Phi fraternity. He died in Miami in August 2000, at the age of 86.
