= Florida's 14th congressional district =

U.S. House district for Florida

Coordinates: 27°50′01″N 82°30′46″W

- Map of district boundaries
- Representative: Kathy Castor; D–Tampa
- Area: 366 mi^{2} (950 km^{2})
- Distribution: 99.3% urban; 0.7% rural
- Population (2025): 806,519
- Median household income: $87,482
- Ethnicity: 46.4% White; 27.1% Hispanic; 17.7% Black; 4.1% Asian; 3.8% Two or more races; 0.9% other
- Cook PVI: R+4

Florida's 14th congressional district is an electoral district for the U.S. Congress and includes western Hillsborough County and southeastern Pinellas County, including most of Tampa. In the 2020 redistricting cycle, the district was redrawn to include almost all areas in both counties which face Tampa Bay, while northeastern Tampa and its neighbouring suburbs are redistricted into the 15th district. The 14th district also includes MacDill Air Force Base and Tampa International Airport.

The former 14th district, in 2003–2012, was located in the Gulf Coast region in Southwestern Florida and included all of Lee County and portions of Charlotte and Collier counties. Fort Myers, Naples, Cape Coral and part of Port Charlotte were located in the district.

From 2013 to 2017, the district was assigned to western Hillsborough County, Florida and Manatee County. After the district boundaries changed in 2017, it was located entirely inside of Hillsborough County and included all of Tampa.

The district is currently represented by Democrat Kathy Castor.

== Recent election results from statewide races ==
Year	Office	Results
2008	President	Obama 61% - 38%
2010	Governor	Sink 60% - 40%
2010	Attorney General	Bondi 47.4% - 46.9%
2010	Chief Financial Officer	Atwater 48% - 44%
2012	President	Obama 61% - 39%
2012	Senate	Nelson 67% - 33%
2014	Governor	Crist 61% - 39%
2016	President	Clinton 58% - 37%
2016	Senate	Murphy 55% - 41%
2018	Senate	Nelson 61% - 39%
2018	Governor	Gillum 61% - 38%
2018	Attorney General	Shaw 55% - 43%
2018	Chief Financial Officer	Ring 59% - 41%
2020	President	Biden 59% - 40%
2022	Senate	Demings 53% - 45%
2022	Governor	Crist 52% - 47%
2022	Attorney General	Ayala 51% - 49%
2022	Chief Financial Officer	Hattersley 53% - 47%
2024	President	Harris 53% - 46%
2024	Senate	Mucarsel-Powell 53% - 46%

== Composition ==
For the 118th and successive Congresses (based on redistricting following the 2020 census), the district contains all or portions of the following counties and communities:

Hillsborough County (14)

Apollo Beach (part; also 16th), Carrollwood (part; also 15th), Citrus Park, East Lake-Orient Part (part; also 15th), Egypt-Lake Leto, Gibsonton (part; also 16th), Keystone (part; also 15th), Northdale (part; also 15th), Palm River-Clair Mel, Progress Village, Ruskin (part; also 16th), Tampa (part; also 15th), Town 'n' Country, Westchase

Pinellas County (3)

Feather Sound (part; also 13th), Lealman (part; also 13th), St. Petersburg (part; also 13th)

== List of members representing the district ==
Representative	Party	Years	Cong ress	Electoral history	District location
District created January 3, 1973
Claude Pepper (Miami)	Democratic	January 3, 1973 – January 3, 1983	93rd 94th 95th 96th 97th	Redistricted from the 11th district and re-elected in 1972. Re-elected in 1974. Re-elected in 1976. Re-elected in 1978. Re-elected in 1980. Redistricted to the 18th district.	
Daniel A. Mica (Lake Worth)	Democratic	January 3, 1983 – January 3, 1989	98th 99th 100th	Redistricted from the 11th district and re-elected in 1982. Re-elected in 1984. Re-elected in 1986. Retired to run for U.S. Senate.	
Harry Johnston (West Palm Beach)	Democratic	January 3, 1989 – January 3, 1993	101st 102nd	Elected in 1988. Re-elected in 1990. Redistricted to the 19th district.	
Porter Goss (Sanibel)	Republican	January 3, 1993 – September 23, 2004	103rd 104th 105th 106th 107th 108th	Redistricted from the 13th district and re-elected in 1992. Re-elected in 1994. Re-elected in 1996. Re-elected in 1998. Re-elected in 2000. Re-elected in 2002. Resigned to become Director of the Central Intelligence Agency.	1993–2003 [data missing]
Porter Goss (Sanibel)	Republican	January 3, 1993 – September 23, 2004	103rd 104th 105th 106th 107th 108th	Redistricted from the 13th district and re-elected in 1992. Re-elected in 1994. Re-elected in 1996. Re-elected in 1998. Re-elected in 2000. Re-elected in 2002. Resigned to become Director of the Central Intelligence Agency.	2003–2013
Vacant		September 23, 2004 – January 3, 2005	108th		2003–2013
Connie Mack IV (Fort Myers)	Republican	January 3, 2005 – January 3, 2013	109th 110th 111th 112th	Elected in 2004. Re-elected in 2006. Re-elected in 2008. Re-elected in 2010. Retired to run for U.S. Senate.	2003–2013
Kathy Castor (Tampa)	Democratic	January 3, 2013 – present	113th 114th 115th 116th 117th 118th 119th	Redistricted from the 11th district and re-elected in 2012. Re-elected in 2014. Re-elected in 2016. Re-elected in 2018. Re-elected in 2020. Re-elected in 2022. Re-elected in 2024. Re-elected in 2026.	2013–2017
Kathy Castor (Tampa)	Democratic	January 3, 2013 – present	113th 114th 115th 116th 117th 118th 119th	Redistricted from the 11th district and re-elected in 2012. Re-elected in 2014. Re-elected in 2016. Re-elected in 2018. Re-elected in 2020. Re-elected in 2022. Re-elected in 2024. Re-elected in 2026.	2017–2023
Kathy Castor (Tampa)	Democratic	January 3, 2013 – present	113th 114th 115th 116th 117th 118th 119th	Redistricted from the 11th district and re-elected in 2012. Re-elected in 2014. Re-elected in 2016. Re-elected in 2018. Re-elected in 2020. Re-elected in 2022. Re-elected in 2024. Re-elected in 2026.	2023–2027

== Election results ==
=== 2002 ===
Florida's 14th Congressional District Election (2002)
Party	Candidate	Votes	%
Republican	Porter J. Goss*	232,566	100.00
Total votes		232,566	100.00
Republican hold			

=== 2004 ===
Florida's 14th Congressional District Election (2004)
Party	Candidate	Votes	%
Republican	Connie Mack IV	226,662	67.59
Democratic	Robert M. Neeld	108,672	32.41
Total votes		335,334	100.00
Republican hold			

=== 2006 ===
Florida's 14th Congressional District Election (2006)
Party	Candidate	Votes	%
Republican	Connie Mack IV*	151,615	64.37
Democratic	Robert M. Neeld	83,920	35.63
Total votes		235,535	100.00
Republican hold			

=== 2008 ===
Florida's 14th Congressional District Election (2008)
Party	Candidate	Votes	%
Republican	Connie Mack IV*	224,602	59.44
Democratic	Robert M. Neeld	93,590	24.77
Independent	Burt Saunders	54,750	14.49
Independent	Jeff George	4,949	1.31
Total votes		377,891	100.00
Republican hold			

=== 2010 ===
Florida's 14th Congressional District Election (2010)
Party	Candidate	Votes	%
Republican	Connie Mack IV*	188,341	68.57
Democratic	James Lloyd Roach	74,525	27.13
Independent	William Maverick St. Claire	11,825	4.31
Total votes		274,691	100.00
Republican hold			

=== 2012 ===
Following the 2010 United States census, the Florida 11th congressional district was renumbered into the 14th congressional district, and Kathy Castor became the incumbent.

Florida 14th Congressional District 2012
Party	Candidate	Votes	%
Democratic	Kathy Castor	197,121	70.25
Republican	Evelio "EJ" Otero	83,480	29.75
Total votes		280,601	100.00

=== 2014 ===
Kathy Castor, the incumbent Representative for Florida's 14th Congressional District, stood unopposed in the 2014 election.

=== 2016 ===
Florida's 14th congressional district election, 2016
Party	Candidate	Votes	%
Democratic	Kathy Castor*	195,789	61.79
Republican	Christine Quinn	121,088	38.21
Total votes		316,877	100.00
Democratic hold			

=== 2018 ===
Kathy Castor, the incumbent Representative for Florida's 14th Congressional District, stood unopposed in the 2018 election.

=== 2020 ===
2020 United States House of Representatives elections in Florida
Party	Candidate	Votes	%
Democratic	Kathy Castor*	224,240	60.26%
Republican	Christine Quinn	147,896	39.74%
Total votes		372,136	100.00
Democratic hold			

=== 2022 ===
2022 United States House of Representatives elections in Florida
Party	Candidate	Votes	%
Democratic	Kathy Castor*	149,737	56.90%
Republican	James Judge	113,427	43.10%
Total votes		263,164	100.00
Democratic hold			

=== 2024 ===
2024 United States House of Representatives elections in Florida
Party	Candidate	Votes	%
Democratic	Kathy Castor*	199,423	56.95%
Republican	Rocky Rochford	145,643	41.59%
Independent	Christopher Bradley	2,595	0.74%
Total votes		350,185	100.00
Democratic hold			
