= Curt Levine =

American politician

Curtis Gilbert Levine
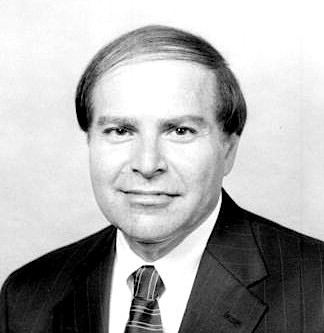
- Levine 1998

Member of the Florida House of Representatives from the 89th district
- In office November 3, 1998 – November 7, 2000
- Preceded by: Barry Silver
- Succeeded by: Irving Slosberg

Personal details
- Born: November 21, 1947 New Britain, Connecticut
- Died: July 31, 2012 (aged 64) Orlando, Florida
- Party: Democratic
- Spouse(s): Marjorie (married January 1972); Catherine, (2008-2012)
- Children: Jessica, Lindsay, Deborah
- Education: Northeastern University, B.A., History, 1970; Suffolk University Law School, J.D., 1973
- Occupation: Attorney

Military service
- Allegiance: United States of America
- Branch/service: United States Army
- Rank: First Lieutenant
- Unit: U.S. Army Field Artillery Corps

Curtis Gilbert Levine (November 21, 1947 – July 31, 2012) was a Florida attorney and politician who served as a member of the Florida House of Representatives.

Levine was born in New Britain, Connecticut on November 21, 1947.

In his first bid for reelection Levine was defeated by Irving Slosberg in the 2000 Democratic primary.

During the 2000 presidential election cycle, Levine served as the co-chair of Al Gore's Florida campaign.

Levine died in Orlando, Florida on July 31, 2012.

== Sources ==
- Florida House of Representatives Profile

Political offices
Preceded by Barry Silver	Florida House of Representatives; District 89; 1998-2000	Succeeded by Irving Slosberg
