= Florida's 91st House of Representatives district =

Florida district

Florida's 91st State House of Representatives district
Representative
Peggy Gossett-Seidman; R–Highland Beach

Florida's 91st House of Representatives district elects one member of the Florida House of Representatives. It contains parts of Palm Beach County.

== Members ==
- Debby Sanderson (1992–2000)
- Connie Mack IV (2000–2003)
- Ellyn Setnor Bogdanoff (2004–2010)
- George Moraitis (2010–2012)
- Irving Slosberg (2012–2016)
- Emily Slosberg (2016–2022)
- Peggy Gossett-Seidman (since 2022)
