= Jewish Democratic Council of America =

U.S. political nonprofit organization

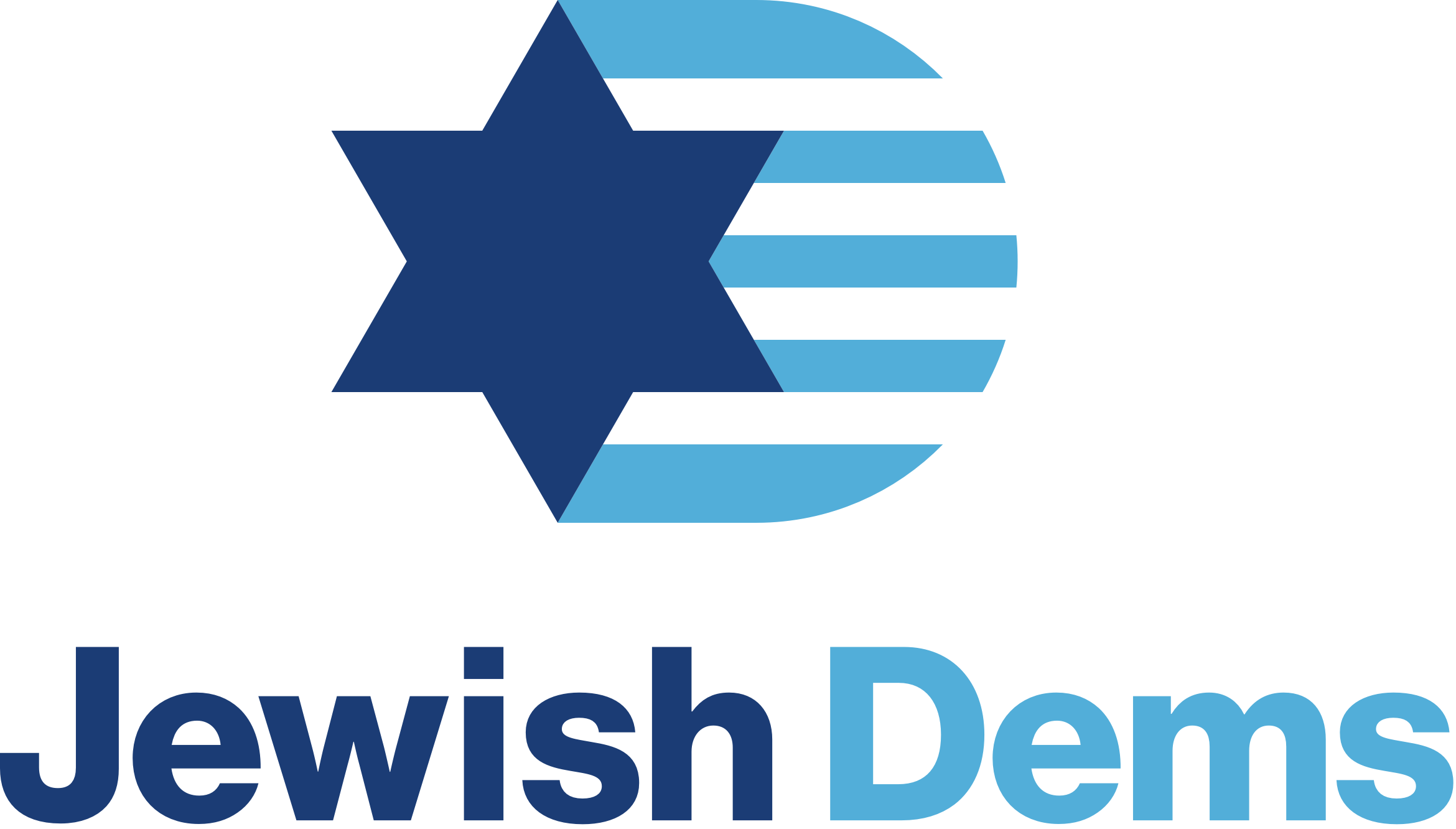
- Formation: November 2017; 8 years ago
- Tax ID no.: 821919054
- Legal status: 501(c)(4) non-profit organization
- Headquarters: Washington, D. C., United States
- Chair: Susie Stern
- Executive Director: Halie Soifer
- Website: www.jewishdems.org

The Jewish Democratic Council of America (JDCA), also known as "Jewish Dems", is an organization that defines itself as "the voice for Jewish Democrats and socially progressive, pro-Israel, and Jewish values". It was announced in August 2017, and officially launched in November 2017. JDCA was incorporated in Washington, D.C., in June 2017. JDCA has 13 chapters and affiliates across the United States.

== Purpose ==
The organization's official mission is to serve as the voice for Jewish Democrats. According to its website, it "promotes like-minded candidates and elected officials and embraces a platform that is grounded in fairness, integrity, the Jewish value of Tikkun Olam, and a strong U.S.–Israel relationship, energizes the Jewish electorate to engage in the electoral and legislative processes, and maintains a commitment to positive change through information sharing, issue advocacy, rapid response, and research, messaging, briefings, and other activities to increase Jewish community engagement in policy and support elected-officials and candidates who share our values". JDCA says that it "serves as the voice for Jewish Democrats and the socially liberal, pro-Israel values that Jewish voters hold dear, the leading voice for Jewish Democrats and socially progressive, pro-Israel and Jewish values". The organization lists policies on numerous topics; among them are defending democracy, reproductive rights, health care, taxes, climate change, Israel, fighting antisemitism, immigration, gun violence prevention, criminal justice reform, and racial justice.

== Background ==
JDCA was announced in August 2017, following President Donald Trump's failure to condemn white nationalist and neo-Nazi demonstrators for violence which took place during the "Unite the Right" rally in Charlottesville, Virginia; it was formally launched in November 2017. Halie Soifer, JDCA's first executive director, explained the catalyst for JDCA's formation, stating that "at that moment, it was very clear, unlike even past Republican administrations, this administration had no qualms about affiliating itself and even sympathizing with anti-Semites". founding Chair Ron Klein has written that American Jews can not afford to be "complacent" in the wake of Donald Trump's election, and must be "on the front-lines of fighting for justice and equality". In his fund-raising appeal for the JDCA, he wrote that "President Trump must be held accountable".

In its launch statement, JDCA said that it would "actively promote to Democratic officeholders and candidates national and local legislative policies consistent with the Jewish community's values, as well as a strong US-Israel relationship".

The organization's inaugural press release said that Trump's rhetoric and tolerance of neo-Nazis, white supremacists, and racists will "empower and embolden" such groups. It criticized the "deafening silence" from some members of Congress and Trump's cabinet and accused those who refuse to speak out of abdicating "their constitutional and moral obligation to our country and its citizens".

U.S. Sen. Chuck Schumer (D-N.Y.) issued a statement saying he looks forward to working with the JDCA on "issues that are important to all Americans, including maintaining the strong U.S.-Israel relationship, curtailing Iran's malign activities, and combating anti-Semitism".

JDCA's launch event was attended by many high-profile members of Congress, including Nancy Pelosi, Ben Cardin, Tim Kaine, Chris Murphy, Sherrod Brown, Steny Hoyer, and Debbie Wasserman Schultz. Senator Cardin (D-Md.), a member of the Senate Foreign Affairs Committee, stated the Democratic Party's objection to imposing "religious tests for who can come to America" but did not explicitly mention Trump's travel ban. Israeli Ambassador Ron Dermer, who spoke at the event, called the group a "strategic asset" for Israel. Although Republicans accused Democrats of moving away from their traditionally pro-Israel positions, Dermer disagreed, saying support for Israel within the Democratic Party was still strong.

== Organization ==
The JDCA is chaired by former Florida congressman Ron Klein. In June 2018, JDCA announced that it had hired its first executive director, Halie Soifer, a former national security advisor for U.S. Senator Kamala Harris and senior policy advisor in the Obama administration. In 2020, Halie Soifer was promoted to CEO.

In March 2024, JDCA announced that the Board of Directors elected Susie Stern, a New York-based Jewish community and Democratic leader, as its next Chair. Stern has served in this role since January 1, 2025.

== Endorsements ==
In June 2018, JDCA announced its first round of endorsements for the 2018 mid-term elections. The four candidates who received endorsements were Bill Nelson, Jacky Rosen, Sean Casten, and Dean Phillips. The JDCA followed that set of endorsements with six more: Claire McCaskill, Sherrod Brown, Conor Lamb, Josh Gottheimer, Mikie Sherrill, and Tom Malinowski.

JDCA made 121 endorsements in the 2020 election, including Presidential Candidate Joe Biden and Congressional candidates such as Adam Schiff, Jamie Raskin, and Cory Booker. In the January 2021 Georgia run-off elections, JDCA endorsed and campaigned for Reverend Raphael Warnock and Jon Ossoff, helping Democrats to win the Senate majority.

In the 2022 midterms, JDCA endorsed House, Senate, and Gubernatorial candidates in states nationwide. Notable endorsements include Josh Shapiro, John Fetterman, Cheri Beasley, and Mark Kelly. JDCA PAC spent $250,000 in the Georgia Senate runoff in support of Senator Reverend Raphael Warnock.

In the 2024 United States House of Representatives elections, JDCA made their first primary endorsements, supporting challengers to Democratic incumbents of The Squad, Cori Bush and Jamaal Bowman, following their criticism of the Israeli invasion of the Gaza Strip (2023–present).

As of April 2024, JDCA has endorsed 83 candidates in the 2024 elections. These candidates included President Joe Biden, Senate candidates Ruben Gallego in Arizona, Adam Schiff in California, Rep. Debbie Mucarsel-Powell in Florida, Rep. Elissa Slotkin in Michigan, and House candidates Wesley Bell in Missouri's District 1 and George Latimer in New York's District 16.

== Advocacy ==
In June 2021, JDCA held its first Week of Action. During this event, it ran 81 meetings with members of Congress, including Gary Peters, Tim Ryan, and Ted Deutch.

JDCA supported the appointment of Deborah Lipstadt to the Office of the Special Envoy to Monitor and Combat Antisemitism.

== Grass-roots voter mobilization ==
In the lead-up to the 2020 election, JDCA led many efforts in grass-roots voter mobilization across the U.S. Due to the COVID-19 pandemic, JDCA's election events were held virtually. Events included a state chapter, young voters' phone banks, and a speaker series. In 2020, a JDCA "Take Back America: Jewish Votes Will Make the Difference", included the announcement of the "Virtual Schlep for 2020", to mobilize Jewish voters in Florida during the COVID-19 pandemic. Among the event's speakers were U.S. Speaker of the House Nancy Pelosi, Senate Majority Leader Chuck Schumer, U.S. House Majority Leader Steny Hoyer, former U.S. Representative Steve Israel, and actors Ben Platt, Tovah Feldshuh, and Jon Lovett. Actor Mandy Patinkin participated in multiple JDCA events, and appeared in a JDCA ad to get out the vote.

== Response from Republican groups ==
The Republican Jewish Coalition (RJC) sent an e-mail to its supporters, saying that JDCA was founded to revitalize two "failed liberal Jewish political groups". The RJC also said that establishing a new organization would not reverse "the continued erosion of support for Israel within the Democrat Party". The JDCA responded by calling the letter "pitiful".
