= 2012 United States Senate election in Florida =

- November 6, 2012
- Turnout: 63.5% (voting eligible)
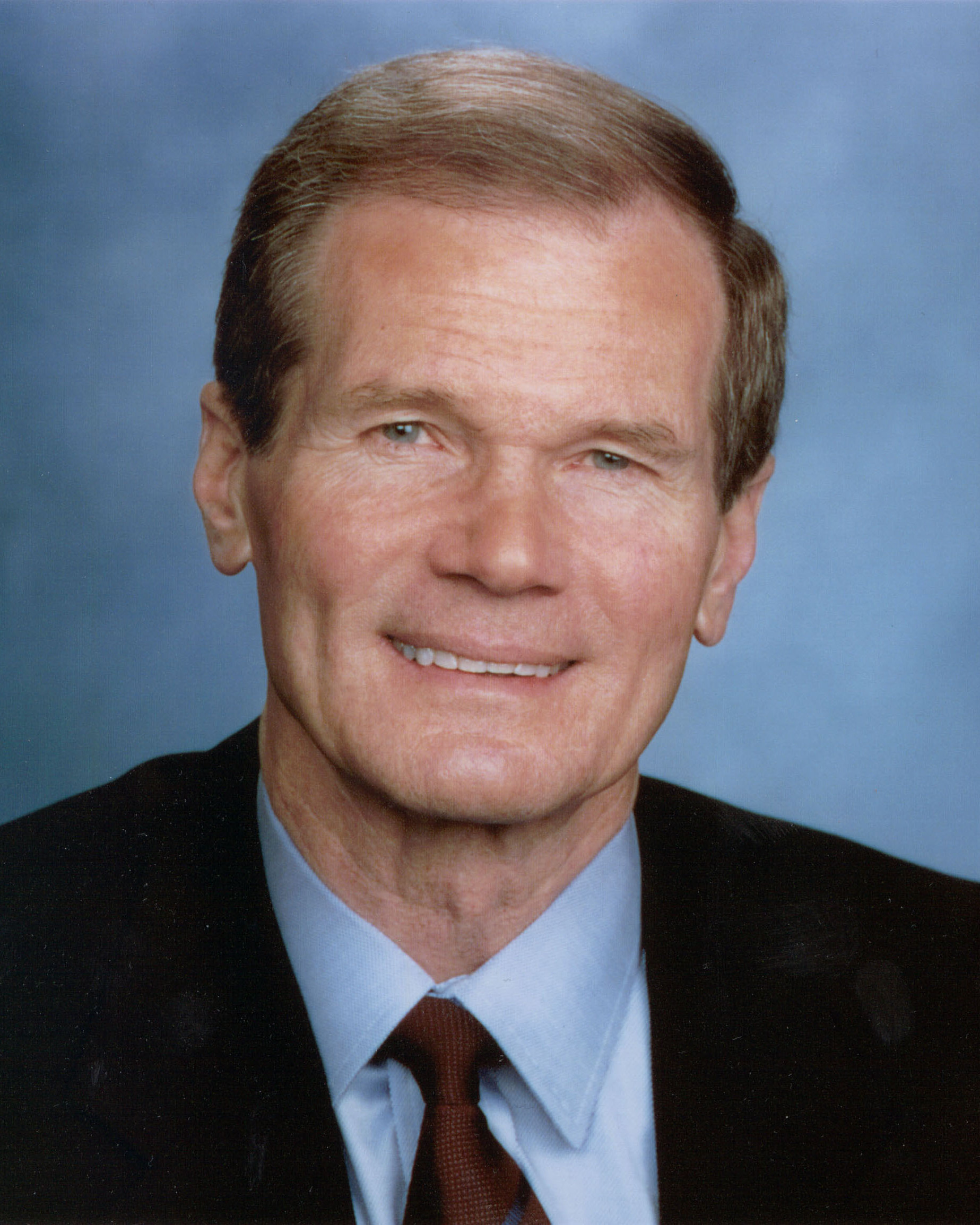

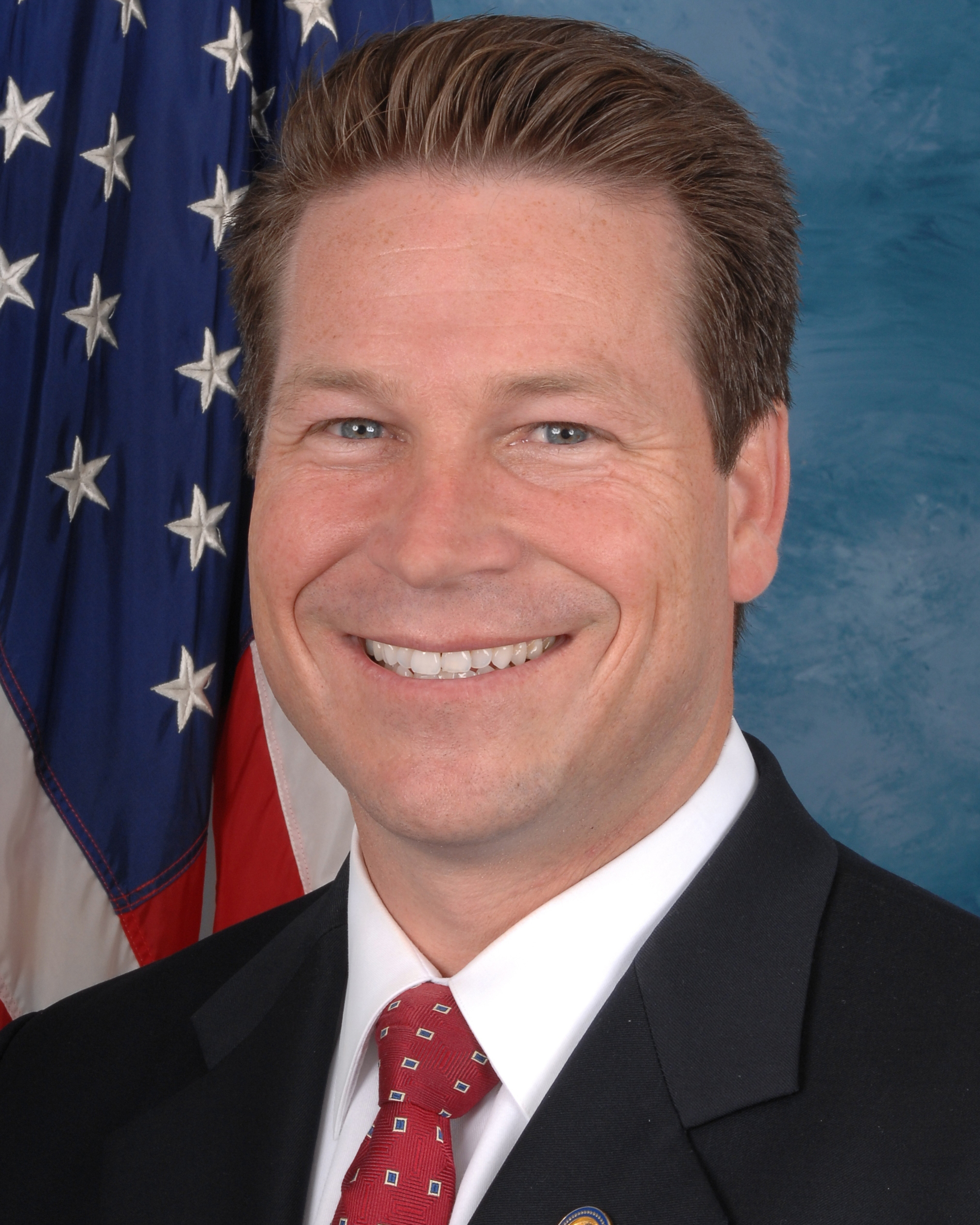
Nominee	Bill Nelson	Connie Mack IV
Party	Democratic	Republican
Popular vote	4,523,451	3,458,267
Percentage	55.23%	42.23%
- Nelson: 40–50% 50–60% 60–70% 70–80% 80–90% Mack: 40–50% 50–60% 60–70%
U.S. senator before election
Bill Nelson
Democratic
Elected U.S. Senator
Bill Nelson
Democratic

The 2012 United States Senate election in Florida was held on November 6, 2012, alongside a presidential election, other elections to the House and Senate, as well as various state and local elections. The primary election was held August 14, 2012. Incumbent Senator Bill Nelson won reelection to a third term, defeating Republican U.S. Representative Connie Mack IV (whose father, Connie Mack III, was Nelson's direct predecessor in that Senate seat) by 13%, winning 55% to 42%. Nelson defeated Mack by over 1 million votes.

Until Donald Trump won 4.6 million votes in the 2016 presidential election and Marco Rubio won 4.8 million votes in the 2016 Senate election, Nelson recorded the most votes in Florida history. As of 2024, this was the last time that a Democrat won a U.S. Senate election in Florida. This is also the last time a Democrat carried the following counties in a statewide election: Brevard, Flagler, Franklin, Hamilton, Hendry, Hernando, Liberty, Madison, Manatee, Marion, Okeechobee, Pasco, Polk, Sarasota, and Volusia.

== Democratic primary ==
=== Candidates ===
- Glenn Burkett
- Bill Nelson, incumbent U.S. senator

=== Results ===
Democratic primary results
Party	Candidate	Votes	%
Democratic	Bill Nelson (incumbent)	684,804	78.7
Democratic	Glenn Burkett	184,815	21.3
Total votes		869,619	100.0

== Republican primary ==
=== Candidates ===
==== Qualified ====
- Connie Mack IV, U.S. representative from Fort Myers
- Mike McCalister, university professor and candidate for Florida governor in 2010
- Marielena Stuart, conservative activist and journalist
- Dave Weldon, former U.S. representative from Indialantic

==== Withdrew ====
- Alexander George, businessman, political activist and minister
- Mike Haridopolos, president of the Florida Senate
- Adam Hasner, former Florida House of Representatives majority leader (running for U.S. House of Representatives)
- George LeMieux, former U.S. senator
- Ron Rushing, businessman (running for state senate)

==== Declined ====
- Jeff Atwater, chief financial officer of Florida
- Allan Bense, former Speaker of the Florida House of Representatives
- Vern Buchanan, U.S. representative
- Jeb Bush, former Florida governor
- Dean Cannon, Speaker of the Florida House of Representatives
- Nicholas M. Loeb, businessman
- Will McBride, attorney and candidate for the U.S. Senate in 2006
- Tom Rooney, U.S. representative
- Chris Ruddy, founder and CEO of Newsmax
- Allen West, U.S. representative

=== Polling ===
Poll source	Date(s) administered	Sample size	Margin of error	George LeMieux	Connie Mack IV	Mike McCalister	Dave Weldon	Someone else	Other/ Undecided
Public Policy Polling	May 31 – June 3, 2012	448	±4.6%	13%	34%	10%	6%	9%	28%
Quinnipiac	June 12–18, 2012	698	±3.7%	8%	41%	5%	3%	1%	39%
Public Policy Polling	July 26–29, 2012	500	±4.4%	—	47%	10%	14%	6%	23%

=== Endorsements ===
George LeMieux (withdrawn)

Individuals

- Haley Barbour, former governor of Mississippi
- Herman Cain, businessman and former 2012 presidential candidate
- Fred Costello, state representative
- Paula Dockery
- Nancy Detert, state senator
- Clay Ford, state representative
- Rene Garcia, state senator
- Charles Van Zant, state representative
Connie Mack IV

Individuals

- Pam Bondi, attorney general of Florida
- Jeb Bush, former governor of Florida, brother of President George W. Bush and son of President George H. W. Bush (R-FL)
- Luis Fortuno, governor of Puerto Rico
- Sean Hannity, author and talk show host
- Mike Haridopolos, state senator and Senate president (R-FL)
- Mike Lee, U.S. senator (R-UT)
- Connie Mack III, former U.S. senator (R-FL) and Mack's father
- Mary Bono Mack, U.S. congresswoman (R-CA) and Mack's wife
- Jeff Miller, U.S. representative
- Rand Paul, U.S. senator (R-KY)
- Ron Paul, U.S. congressman and 2012 presidential candidate
- Adam Putnam, Florida Commissioner of Agriculture and former congressman
- Mitt Romney, presumptive nominee of the Republican Party for president of the United States in the 2012 election; former governor of Massachusetts.
- Tom Rooney, U.S. representative

Organizations

- GOProud

=== Results ===
Results by county: Mack: 40–50%; 50–60%; 60–70%; 70–80%; Weldon: 50–60%

Republican primary results
Party	Candidate	Votes	%
Republican	Connie Mack IV	657,331	58.7
Republican	Dave Weldon	226,083	20.2
Republican	Mike McCalister	155,421	13.9
Republican	Marielena Stuart	81,808	7.3
Total votes		1,120,643	100.0

== General election ==
Early in the race, Nelson appeared to be vulnerable, with some earlier polls showing Mack leading. However, in the last few weeks, with new polls conducted, it appeared as though Nelson was headed for a victory. The last poll placed him five percentage points ahead of Mack; Nelson would win easily by 13 percentage points. Nelson performed well in Southeast Florida (the Miami area), Tampa, Gainesville, typically Democratic areas. Nelson, however, managed to win in areas that typically lean Republican. He won in Duval County, home of Jacksonville, and Volusia County, home of Daytona Beach. Nelson's ability to outperform President Obama led to him winning the election easily. Obama would still win Florida, but by just about 74,000 votes, and less than a percentage point. Nelson began his third term in the Senate on January 3, 2013.

=== Candidates ===
- Chris Borgia (Independent), Iraq War veteran
- Bill Gaylor (Independent), owner, Bill and Sheila Gaylor Insurance
- Connie Mack IV (Republican), U.S. congressman
- Bill Nelson (Democratic), incumbent U.S. senator

=== Debates ===
Only one debate was held, hosted by Leadership Florida/Florida Press Association occurred on October 17 at the Nova Southeastern University campus in Davie.

- Complete video of debate, October 17, 2012 - C-SPAN

=== Fundraising ===
Candidate (party)	Receipts	Disbursements	Cash on hand	Debt
Bill Nelson (D)	$13,404,998	$15,494,167	$994,324	$0
Connie Mack (R)	$7,272,224	$7,526,150	$155,076	$81,880
Chris Borgia (I)	$12,344	$12,198	$145	$9,950
Bill Gaylor (I)	$19,604	$19,195	$0	$0
Source: Federal Election Commission

==== Top contributors ====
Bill Nelson	Contribution	Connie Mack	Contribution	Bill Gaylor	Contribution
Morgan & Morgan	$138,150	Club for Growth	$189,168	Bill & Sheila Gaylor Insurance Professionals	$7,905
Finmeccanica	$71,967	Elliott Management Corporation	$46,997	Circle Redmont	$1,432
InDyne, Inc.	$64,735	Koch Industries	$33,500		
Harris Corporation	$59,750	Vestar Capital Partners	$32,000		
Akerman Senterfitt LLP	$59,300	Island Doctors	$27,400		
Greenberg Traurig	$52,589	Adams & Diaco	$25,000		
Kindred Healthcare	$21,000	Health Management Associates	$21,000		
Holland & Knight	$46,747	Flo-Sun Inc	$18,500		
Leon Medical Centers	$45,800	US Sugar Corporation	$18,000		
Vestar Capital Partners	$40,650	MasTec, Inc.	$17,800		
Source: OpenSecrets

==== Top industries ====
Bill Nelson	Contribution	Connie Mack	Contribution	Bill Gaylor	Contribution
Lawyers/law firms	$2,383,484	Retired	$885,121	Retired	$1,500
Retired	$938,280	Republican/Conservative	$412,944		
Real estate	$606,253	Financial institutions	$360,334		
Health professionals	$529,282	Real estate	$298,642		
Lobbyists	$493,087	Leadership PACs	$280,500		
Financial institutions	$418,915	Misc. finance	$216,836		
Hospitals/nursing homes	$364,617	Health professionals	$199,159		
Leadership PACs	$337,000	Lawyers/law firms	$169,921		
Insurance industry	$319,788	Petroleum industry	$136,400		
Health services/HMOs	$276,500	Business services	$128,777		
Source: OpenSecrets

==== Independent expenditures ====
In early October 2012, Crossroads GPS announced it would launch a $16 million advertising buy in national races, of which four were this election, and three were other Senate elections. In Florida, the money was to be spent by its affiliate, American Crossroads.

=== Predictions ===
Source	Ranking	As of
The Cook Political Report	Lean D	November 1, 2012
Sabato's Crystal Ball	Likely D	November 5, 2012
Rothenberg Political Report	Likely D	November 2, 2012
Real Clear Politics	Lean D	November 5, 2012

=== Polling ===
Poll source	Date(s) administered	Sample size	Margin of error	Bill Nelson (D)	Connie Mack IV (R)	Other	Undecided
Public Policy Polling	October 9–10, 2010	448	±4.6%	42%	33%	—	25%
Public Policy Polling	December 17–20, 2010	1,034	±3.0%	44%	36%	—	20%
Mason-Dixon	February 9–10, 2011	625	±4.0%	45%	40%	—	15%
Public Policy Polling	March 24–27, 2011	500	±4.4%	47%	34%	—	18%
Quinnipiac	October 31 – November 7, 2011	1,185	±2.9%	42%	40%	1%	16%
Rasmussen Reports	November 17, 2011	500	±4.5%	39%	43%	5%	13%
Public Policy Polling	November 28 – December 1, 2011	700	±3.7%	46%	35%	—	19%
Quinnipiac	January 4–8, 2012	1,412	±2.6%	41%	40%	1%	16%
Suffolk University	January 22–24, 2012	600	±4.4%	42%	32%	1%	25%
Mason-Dixon	January 24–26, 2012	800	±3.5%	45%	42%	—	13%
Rasmussen Reports	February 13, 2012	500	±4.5%	41%	41%	5%	12%
Rasmussen Reports	March 13, 2012	500	±4.5%	36%	43%	5%	16%
Quinnipiac	March 20–26, 2012	1,228	±2.8%	44%	36%	3%	17%
Public Policy Polling	April 12–15, 2012	700	±3.7%	47%	37%	—	17%
Rasmussen Reports	April 25, 2012	500	±4.5%	47%	36%	10%	7%
Quinnipiac	May 15–21, 2012	1,722	±2.4%	41%	42%	3%	15%
Marist	May 17–20, 2012	1,078	±3.0%	46%	42%	—	12%
Public Policy Polling	May 31 – June 3, 2012	642	±3.9%	49%	36%	—	15%
Quinnipiac	June 12–18, 2012	1,697	±2.4%	43%	39%	—	15%
Quinnipiac	June 19–25, 2012	1,200	±2.8%	41%	40%	1%	17%
Rasmussen Reports	July 9, 2012	500	±4.5%	37%	46%	7%	10%
Mason-Dixon	July 9–11, 2012	800	±3.5%	47%	42%	—	11%
Survey USA	July 17–19, 2012	647	±3.9%	42%	48%	2%	8%
Public Policy Polling	July 26–29, 2012	871	±3.3%	45%	43%	—	13%
Quinnipiac	July 24–30, 2012	1,177	±2.9%	47%	40%	1%	12%
Rasmussen Reports	August 15, 2012	500	±4.5%	47%	40%	3%	10%
Quinnipiac	August 15–21, 2012	1,241	±2.8%	50%	41%	—	9%
Public Policy Polling	August 31 – September 2, 2012	1,548	±2.5%	45%	38%	—	17%
SurveyUSA	September 7–9, 2012	596	±4.1%	47%	36%	3%	9%
NBC/WSJ/Marist Poll	September 9–11, 2012	980	±3.1%	51%	37%	—	12%
Rasmussen Reports	September 12, 2012	500	±4.5%	47%	40%	5%	8%
Fox News Poll	September 16–18, 2012	829	±3.0%	49%	35%	2%	12%
TBT/Miami Herald	September 17–19, 2012	800	±3.5%	48%	40%	—	11%
Suffolk University	September 27–30, 2012	600	±4.0%	40%	34%	5%	20%
NBC/WSJ/Marist Poll	September 30 – October 1, 2012	890	±3.3%	52%	41%	—	7%
Rasmussen Reports	October 4, 2012	500	±4.5%	52%	41%	1%	6%
University of North Florida	October 1–9, 2012	800	±3.5%	50%	40%	—	10%
NBC/WSJ/Marist Poll	October 7–9, 2012	988	±3.1%	52%	39%	—	9%
TBT/Miami Herald	October 8–10, 2012	800	±3.5%	47%	42%	4%	7%
Rasmussen Reports	October 11, 2012	750	±4.0%	46%	45%	5%	5%
Public Policy Polling	October 12–14, 2012	791	±3.4%	45%	37%	—	18%
SurveyUSA	October 17–18, 2012	600	±4.1%	48%	40%	4%	8%
Scripps Treasure Coast Newspapers/WPTV	October 17–18, 2012	800	±4.0%	45%	41%	—	14%
Rasmussen Reports	October 18, 2012	750	±4.0%	48%	43%	2%	7%
Angus Reid Public Opinion	October 18–20, 2012	502	±4.5%	56%	39%	4%	—
Pharos Research	October 19–21, 2012	759	±3.6%	52%	44%	—	5%
Sunshine State News/VSS	October 22–24, 2012	1,001	±3.1%	49%	44%	—	7%
Mason-Dixon	October 22–24, 2012	625	±4.0%	47%	44%	—	9%
Rasmussen Reports	October 25, 2012	750	±4.0%	49%	46%	2%	3%
WFLA-TV/SurveyUSA	October 25–27, 2012	595	±4.1%	48%	41%	4%	7%
CBS/Quinnipiac University	October 23–28, 2012	1,073	±3.0%	52%	39%	—	9%
Public Policy Polling	October 26–28, 2012	687	±3.7%	50%	42%	—	9%
Zogby/Newsmax	October 26–28, 2012	827	±3.5%	50%	41%	—	9%
Zogby/Newsmax	October 27–29, 2012	828	±3.5%	50%	41%	—	9%
Gravis Marketing	October 30, 2012	549	±4.2%	49%	46%	—	5%
Reuters/Ipsos	October 29–31, 2012	716	±4.2%	52%	42%	1%	6%
NBC/WSJ/Marist	October 30 – November 1, 2012	1,545	±2.5%	52%	43%	1%	5%
Mason-Dixon	October 30 – November 1, 2012	800	±3.5%	49%	43%	4%	—
Angus Reid Public Opinion	November 1–3, 2012	525	±4.3%	53%	45%	2%	—
Public Policy Polling	November 3–4, 2012	955	±3.2%	51%	46%	—	3%

Hypothetical polling

Republican primary

Poll source	Date(s) administered	Sample size	Margin of error	Adam Hasner	George LeMieux	Connie Mack IV	Mike McCalister	Craig Miller	Other/ Undecided
Quinnipiac	July 27 – August 2, 2011	510	±4.3%	6%	12%	—	15%	8%	60%
Quinnipiac	September 14–19, 2011	374	±5.1%	5%	17%	—	5%	11%	62%
Public Policy Polling	September 22–25, 2011	472	±4.5%	9%	13%	—	17%	3%	58%
Quinnipiac	October 31 – November 7, 2011	513	±4.3%	2%	9%	32%	6%	2%	51%
Public Policy Polling	November 28–30, 2011	470	±4.5%	3%	12%	40%	4%	3%	38%
Dixie Strategies/First Coast News	January 23–25, 2012	2,567	±1.93%	3.81%	6.91%	28.88%	3.36%	1.78%	55.26%
Mason-Dixon	January 24–26, 2012	500	±4.5%	4%	12%	38%	7%	1%	38%
Miami Herald/War Room Logistics	January 27, 2012	1,632	±2.5%	2.7%	6.2%	33.0%	3.2%	2.3%	52.6%
Public Policy Polling	January 28, 2012	387	±5.0%	4%	6%	36%	5%	3%	46%
Public Policy Polling	January 28–29, 2012	733	±3.6%	4%	8%	36%	5%	3%	44%
Public Policy Polling	January 28–30, 2012	1,087	±3%	3%	8%	39%	4%	3%	42%

Poll source	Date(s) administered	Sample size	Margin of error	Mike Haridopolos	Adam Hasner	George LeMieux	Mike McCalister	Other/ Undecided
Sunshine State Communications	May 12–13, 2011	458	±4.58%	11%	0%	9%	4%	64%
Quinnipiac	May 17–23, 2011	463	±4.6%	13%	4%	14%	—	64%

Poll source	Date(s) administered	Sample size	Margin of error	Vern Buchanan	Jennifer Carroll	Mike Haridopolos	Adam Hasner	George LeMieux	Nick Loeb	Will McBride	Mike McCalister	Joe Scarborough	Daniel Webster	Other/ Undecided
Suffolk University/7 News	April 10–12, 2011	217	±4%	5%	3%	2%	1%	4%	1%	3%	0%	6%	7%	67%

General election

Poll source	Date(s) administered	Sample size	Margin of error	Bill Nelson (D)	Vern Buchanan (R)	Other	Undecided
Mason-Dixon	August 18–22, 2011	625	±4.0%	45%	35%	—	20%

Poll source	Date(s) administered	Sample size	Margin of error	Bill Nelson (D)	Jeb Bush (R)	Other	Undecided
Public Policy Polling	July 16–18, 2010	900	±3.26%	46%	44%	—	9%
Public Policy Polling	December 17–20, 2010	1,034	±3.0%	44%	49%	—	7%
Mason-Dixon	February 9–10, 2011	625	±4.0%	41%	49%	—	10%

Poll source	Date(s) administered	Sample size	Margin of error	Bill Nelson (D)	Mike Haridopolos (R)	Other	Undecided
Public Policy Polling	December 17–20, 2010	1,034	±3.0%	44%	32%	—	24%
Mason-Dixon	February 9–10, 2011	625	±4.0%	48%	27%	—	25%
Public Policy Polling	March 24–27, 2011	500	±4.4%	50%	34%	—	17%
Quinnipiac	May 17–23, 2011	1,196	±2.8%	47%	26%	2%	22%
Public Policy Polling	June 16–19, 2011	848	±3.4%	47%	35%	—	18%

Poll source	Date(s) administered	Sample size	Margin of error	Bill Nelson (D)	Adam Hasner (R)	Other	Undecided
Public Policy Polling	December 17–20, 2010	1,034	±3.0%	46%	30%	—	25%
Mason-Dixon	February 9–10, 2011	625	±4.0%	46%	24%	—	30%
Public Policy Polling	March 24–27, 2011	500	±4.4%	48%	32%	—	20%
Quinnipiac	May 17–23, 2011	1,196	±2.8%	48%	23%	3%	24%
Public Policy Polling	June 16–19, 2011	848	±3.4%	47%	35%	—	19%
Mason-Dixon	August 18–22, 2011	625	±4.0%	45%	34%	—	21%
Public Policy Polling	September 22–25, 2011	476	±4.5%	49%	35%	—	16%
Rasmussen Reports	November 17, 2011	500	±4.5%	40%	31%	9%	19%
Public Policy Polling	November 28 – December 1, 2011	700	±3.7%	48%	33%	—	19%
Suffolk University	January 22–24, 2012	600	±4.4%	47%	23%	2%	28%

Poll source	Date(s) administered	Sample size	Margin of error	Bill Nelson (D)	George LeMieux (R)	Other	Undecided
Public Policy Polling	July 16–18, 2010	900	±3.26%	49%	28%	—	23%
Public Policy Polling	December 17–20, 2010	1,034	±3.0%	47%	36%	—	17%
Mason-Dixon	February 9–10, 2011	625	±4.0%	49%	35%	—	16%
Public Policy Polling	March 24–27, 2011	500	±4.4%	48%	33%	—	19%
Quinnipiac	May 17–23, 2011	1,196	±2.8%	47%	27%	2%	22%
Public Policy Polling	June 16–19, 2011	848	±3.4%	46%	35%	—	19%
Mason-Dixon	August 18–22, 2011	625	±4.0%	49%	34%	—	17%
Public Policy Polling	September 22–25, 2011	476	±4.5%	49%	35%	—	15%
Rasmussen Reports	November 17, 2011	500	±4.5%	39%	33%	10%	18%
Public Policy Polling	November 28 – December 1, 2011	700	±3.7%	47%	32%	—	20%
Suffolk University	January 22–24, 2012	600	±4.4%	46%	22%	2%	30%
Mason-Dixon	January 24–26, 2012	800	±3.5%	48%	33%	—	19%
Rasmussen Reports	February 13, 2012	500	±4.5%	45%	35%	5%	15%
Rasmussen Reports	March 13, 2012	500	±4.5%	41%	38%	5%	17%
Public Policy Polling	April 12–15, 2012	700	±3.7%	48%	34%	—	18%
Rasmussen Reports	April 25, 2012	500	±4.5%	44%	30%	9%	17%
Marist	May 17–20, 2012	1,078	±3%	46%	42%	—	12%
Public Policy Polling	May 31 – June 3, 2012	642	±3.9%	48%	35%	—	17%
Quinnipiac	June 12–18, 2012	1,697	±2.4%	47%	32%	1%	17%

Poll source	Date(s) administered	Sample size	Margin of error	Bill Nelson (D)	Rush Limbaugh (R)	Other	Undecided
Public Policy Polling	October 9–10, 2010	448	±4.6%	50%	36%	—	14%

Poll source	Date(s) administered	Sample size	Margin of error	Bill Nelson (D)	Mike McCalister (R)	Other	Undecided
Public Policy Polling	July 26–29, 2012	871	±3.3%	45%	40%	—	15%
Quinnipiac	June 12–18, 2012	1,697	±2.4%	45%	34%	1%	18%
Public Policy Polling	May 31 – June 3, 2012	642	±3.9%	47%	33%	—	20%
Rasmussen Reports	April 25, 2012	500	±4.5%	48%	29%	7%	15%
Public Policy Polling	April 12–15, 2012	700	±3.7%	47%	35%	—	19%
Rasmussen Reports	March 13, 2012	500	±4.5%	42%	38%	4%	15%
Rasmussen Reports	February 13, 2012	500	±4.5%	43%	37%	5%	15%
Suffolk University	January 22–24, 2012	600	±4.4%	45%	26%	2%	28%
Public Policy Polling	November 28 – December 1, 2011	700	±3.7%	47%	32%	—	21%
Public Policy Polling	September 22–25, 2011	476	±4.5%	47%	34%	—	19%

Poll source	Date(s) administered	Sample size	Margin of error	Bill Nelson (D)	Craig Miller (R)	Other	Undecided
Public Policy Polling	November 28 – December 1, 2011	700	±3.7%	49%	30%	—	21%
Public Policy Polling	September 22–25, 2011	476	±4.5%	49%	32%	—	19%

Poll source	Date(s) administered	Sample size	Margin of error	Bill Nelson (D)	Joe Scarborough (R)	Other	Undecided
Public Policy Polling	March 24–27, 2011	500	±4.4%	45%	32%	—	22%

Poll source	Date(s) administered	Sample size	Margin of error	Bill Nelson (D)	Jimmy Wales (R)	Other	Undecided
Public Policy Polling	March 24–27, 2011	500	±4.4%	47%	28%	—	25%

Poll source	Date(s) administered	Sample size	Margin of error	Bill Nelson (D)	Dave Weldon (R)	Other	Undecided
Public Policy Polling	July 26–29, 2012	871	±3.3%	46%	39%	—	15%
Quinnipiac	June 12–18, 2012	1,697	±2.4%	47%	31%	1%	19%
Public Policy Polling	May 31 – June 3, 2012	642	±3.9%	47%	31%	—	22%

Poll source	Date(s) administered	Sample size	Margin of error	Bill Nelson (D)	Allen West (R)	Other	Undecided
Mason-Dixon	August 18–22, 2011	625	±4.0%	44%	38%	—	18%

=== Results ===
State Senate district results

United States Senate election in Florida, 2012
Party	Candidate	Votes	%	±%
Democratic	Bill Nelson (incumbent)	4,523,451	55.23%	−5.07%
Republican	Connie Mack IV	3,458,267	42.23%	+4.13%
Independent	Bill Gaylor	126,079	1.54%	N/A
Independent	Chris Borgia	82,089	1.00%	N/A
Write-in		60	0.0	N/A
Total votes		8,189,946	100.00%	N/A
Democratic hold				

==== Counties that flipped from Democratic to Republican ====
- Calhoun (largest city: Blountstown)
- Citrus (largest city: Homosassa Springs)
- Dixie (largest city: Cross City)
- Gilchrist (largest city: Trenton)
- Glades (largest city: Moore Haven)
- Gulf (largest city: Port St. Joe)
- Levy (largest city: Williston)
- Putnam (largest city: Palatka)
- Sumter (largest city: The Villages)
- Taylor (largest city: Perry)
- Wakulla (largest city: Sopchoppy)
- Jackson (largest city: Marianna)
- Bradford (largest city: Starke)
- Charlotte (largest city: Charlotte)
- Columbia (largest city: Lake City)
- DeSoto (largest city: Arcadia)
- Escambia (largest city: Pensacola)
- Hardee (largest city: Wachula)
- Highlands (largest city: Sebring)
- Indian River (largest city: Sebastian)
- Lafayette (largest city: Mayo)
- Lake (largest city: Clermont)
- Lee (largest city: Cape Coral)
- Suwannee (largest city: Live Oak)
- Union (largest city: Lake Butler)
- Washington (largest city: Chipley)

==== By congressional district ====
Nelson won 20 of 27 congressional districts, including ten that elected Republicans.

District	Nelson	Mack	Representative
1st	35.83%	61.28%	Jeff Miller
2nd	54.07%	43.43%	Steve Southerland
3rd	44.66%	52.39%	Corrine Brown (112th Congress)
3rd	44.66%	52.39%	Ted Yoho (113th Congress)
4th	42.16%	54.58%	Ander Crenshaw
5th	73.70%	24.22%	Rich Nugent (112th Congress)
5th	73.70%	24.22%	Corrine Brown (113th Congress)
6th	47.91%	48.98%	Cliff Stearns (112th Congress)
6th	47.91%	48.98%	Ron DeSantis (113th Congress)
7th	53.65%	43.81%	John Mica
8th	49.47%	47.15%	Bill Posey
9th	66.35%	31.16%	Gus Bilirakis (112th Congress)
9th	66.35%	31.16%	Alan Grayson (113th Congress)
10th	52.04%	45.20%	Bill Young (112th Congress)
10th	52.04%	45.20%	Daniel Webster (113th Congress)
11th	48.07%	48.40%	Kathy Castor (112th Congress)
11th	48.07%	48.40%	Rich Nugent (113th Congress)
12th	52.57%	43.83%	Dennis A. Ross (112th Congress)
12th	52.57%	43.83%	Gus Bilirakis (113th Congress)
13th	57.44%	39.10%	Vern Buchanan (112th Congress)
13th	57.44%	39.10%	Bill Young (113th Congress)
14th	69.28%	28.45%	Connie Mack IV (112th Congress)
14th	69.28%	28.45%	Kathy Castor (113th Congress)
15th	52.21%	44.94%	Bill Posey (112th Congress)
15th	52.21%	44.94%	Dennis A. Ross (113th Congress)
16th	50.39%	46.70%	Tom Rooney (112th Congress)
16th	50.39%	46.70%	Vern Buchanan (113th Congress)
17th	47.22%	49.18%	Frederica Wilson (112th Congress)
17th	47.22%	49.18%	Tom Rooney (113th Congress)
18th	53.60%	44.47%	Ileana Ros-Lehtinen (112th Congress)
18th	53.60%	44.47%	Patrick Murphy (113th Congress)
19th	42.66%	54.51%	Ted Deutch (112th Congress)
19th	42.66%	54.51%	Trey Radel (113th Congress)
20th	83.73%	15.04%	Debbie Wasserman Schultz (112th Congress)
20th	83.73%	15.04%	Alcee Hastings (113th Congress)
21st	65.65%	32.87%	Mario Díaz-Balart (112th Congress)
21st	65.65%	32.87%	Ted Deutch (113th Congress)
22nd	58.84%	39.62%	Allen West (112th Congress)
22nd	58.84%	39.62%	Lois Frankel (113th Congress)
23rd	64.73%	33.81%	Alcee Hastings (112th Congress)
23rd	64.73%	33.81%	Debbie Wasserman Schultz (113th Congress)
24th	87.29%	11.71%	Sandy Adams (112th Congress)
24th	87.29%	11.71%	Frederica Wilson (113th Congress)
25th	50.74%	47.12%	David Rivera (112th Congress)
25th	50.74%	47.12%	Mario Díaz-Balart (113th Congress)
26th	54.90%	43.56%	Joe Garcia
27th	55.20%	43.33%	Ileana Ros-Lehtinen

== See also ==
- 2012 United States Senate elections
- 2012 United States House of Representatives elections in Florida
- 2012 United States presidential election in Florida
