= Homeowner's Defense Act =

United States Homeowner's Defense Act of 2009
- Long title: To ensure the availability and affordability of homeowners' insurance coverage for catastrophic events.
- Acronyms (colloquial): USHDA

Legislative history
- Introduced in the House of Representatives as H.R.3355 by Rep. Ron Klein (D-FL) on August 3, 2007; Committee consideration by House Financial Services and Senate Banking, Housing, and Urban Affairs

Major amendments
- H.Amdt885 -Pass- An amendment numbered 17 printed in the Congressional Record to make technical and conforming changes; add a new title which inserts new provisions on reinsurance coverage for qualified reinsurance programs; and to insert provisions requiring a study on the need for conditional coverage of commercial residential lines of insurance. H.Amdt886 -Fail- An amendment numbered 6 printed in the Congressional Record to insert clarifying language to the bill relating to best practices in building codes. H.Amdt887 -Pass- An amendment numbered 14 printed in the Congressional Record to include language which clarifies mitigation measures and encourages state and local governments to develop comprehensive land use and zoning plans that include natural hazard mitigation. H.Amdt888 -Fail- An amendment numbered 13 printed in the Congressional Record to insert clarifying language with respect to catastrophic loans and losses covered by such loans. H.Amdt889 -Withdrawn- An amendment numbered 2 printed in the Congressional Record to insert provisions which help to limit developer overbuilding in areas subject to risk of catastrophic financial loss. H.Amdt890 -Fail- An amendment numbered 1 printed in the Congressional Record to insert clarifying language relating to delinquency of loans made for assistance in connection with a natural or other major disaster. H.Amdt891 -Pass- An amendment numbered 4 printed in the Congressional Record to require that annual reports shall include an assessment of the costs to states and regions associated with catastrophe risk and an analysis of the costs and benefits, for states not participating in the consortium. H.Amdt892 -Offered- An amendment numbered 12 printed in the Congressional Record to insert clarifying language relating to price gouging. H.Amdt893 -Pass- An amendment to modify the instruction prohibiting price gouging by replacing it with language discouraging price gouging. H.Amdt894 -Pass- An amendment numbered 15 printed in the Congressional Record to insert language prohibiting use of Federal funds of any kind or from any Federal source (including any disaster or other financial assistance, loan proceeds, and any other assistance or subsidy) to repay a loan. H.Amdt895 -Fail- An amendment in the nature of a substitute numbered 5 printed in the Congressional Record to insert a complete new text. H.Amdt896 -Withdrawn- An amendment numbered 3 printed in the Congressional Record to provide for inclusion of business owners under the provisions of the bill.

The Homeowners’ Defense Act (H.R. 2555) is a bill proposed in the House and Senate in the 111th United States Congress. The bill was proposed by Democratic Representative, Ron Klein of Florida. The purpose of the law, according to its sponsors, is to ensure availability of homeowners’ insurance for catastrophic events. The legislation would create a National Catastrophe Risk Consortium to monitor and regulate state insurance entities. The Consortium would also be able to issue securities and loans from the U.S. Treasury to provide capital to state-run insurers for catastrophe related risks. Previous forms of the bill were introduced in the House and Senate, including H.R. 3355 (2007) (which passed in the House in 2007), but were never passed in both the House and Senate.

== Support ==
Members of both parties, the great majority of them from hurricane-prone areas, support the Homeowners' Defense Act. Supporters say that the bill would reduce insurance costs for consumers by helping create a national fund to help pool the risk associated with catastrophes. Many supporters, including Representative Ron Klein (D-FL), cite rising insurance costs and private insurance companies leaving the area as a sign that the private market for property insurance is not working, and thus the federal intervention and regulation is necessary. Private insurers, like State Farm, have also joined in support of the legislation saying that the private market alone has insufficient capacity to handle large catastrophic disaster coverage for homeowners. Supporters formed the coalition, ProtectingAmerica.

== Opposition ==
Opposition to the Homeowners’ Defense Act has come from very different sides including the national coalition, SmarterSafer, made up of environmental, free market, good government, and tax payer groups. Many environmental groups like the National Wildlife Federation were opposed to the bill because they believed it would encourage home construction in environmentally sensitive areas. Free-market and tax payer advocacy groups like the Heartland Institute were also in opposition to the legislation on grounds that it'd crowd-out the private insurance market and encourage building homes in risky, hurricane-prone areas.
