= Shepard Broad =

American lawyer (1906–2001)

- Born: Szmuel Bobrowicé; July 8, 1906; Pinsk, Belarus, Minsk Governorate, Russian Empire
- Died: November 6, 2001 (aged 95); Bay Harbor Islands, Florida, United States
- Occupations: Lawyer, banker, philanthropist
- Known for: Founder of: Bay Harbor Islands, Broad Causeway, American Savings and Loan, The Shepard Broad Foundation

Shepard Broad (July 8, 1906 – November 6, 2001) was a Belarusian-American banker, lawyer and philanthropist.

== Early life and education ==
Shepard Broad was born in Pinsk, Russia as Szmuel Bobrowice in 1906. Bobrowice lost his mother at the age of three and became an orphan at ten years old, when his father died in World War I.

He trained as a tailor's apprentice, but Eastern Europe offered little opportunity to a young Jewish boy. At the age of 14, he joined the mass migration to North America. Hoping to land in New York, he ended up in Quebec. Canadian immigration authorities planned to send him back to Russia, but his plight came to the attention of Adolph Stark, president of the Canadian-Jewish Immigration Society. Stark offered to adopt him, but Bobrowice was determined to find his uncle in New York. Stark gave him a train ticket, and Bobrowice made it to New York in 1920, knowing no English at the time.

Upon meeting his uncle in New York, he was given the new name of Shepard Broad and enrolled in school. Because he spoke only Yiddish, Broad was assigned to a third-grade class. However, within a year, Broad was able to attend high school.

Shepard Broad received his law degree from New York Law School in 1927, and he was admitted to the New York State Bar in 1928.

== Career ==
From 1928 through 1940, Broad practiced law in New York City.

In August 1940, Broad was admitted to The Florida Bar, and he brought his wife Ruth to live in South Florida. He opened a law office in Miami Beach, Florida the next year. On January 1, 1946, he founded the law firm of Broad and Cassel, which continues operations to this day with offices throughout Florida.

In 1946, Broad helped organize the Bank of Hollywood Hills and the North Shore Bank of Miami Beach. The following year, he helped establish the American Savings and Loan Association of Florida. He subsequently served as the president of the Mercantile National Bank of Miami Beach. He also assisted in founding the Bank of Miramar, Florida.

Broad founded the town of Bay Harbor Islands, Florida in 1947 and became its first mayor.

== Philanthropy ==
=== Involvement with Israel ===
He and twenty-one other Jewish men met in a New York City apartment in 1945 and agreed on an audacious plan to help create a homeland for the world's Jewish people. Among his colleagues: David Ben-Gurion, who later became Israel's first prime minister.

As World War II drew to an end, Broad, Ben-Gurion and their colleagues created an underground infrastructure to raise funds for Israel, provide weapons for its eventual 1947–1949 Palestine war and help Holocaust survivors and others reach what was then called Palestine. One of the donors was the Jewish mobster Meyer Lansky, "You did not have to ask Meyer Lansky twice" for money Broad remembered, and Lansky "was always waiting for me in the lobby, ready with a check".

=== Bay Harbor Islands, Florida ===
In 1945, he Broad two undeveloped mangrove swamp islands off 96th Street on Miami Beach. With his own funds and with down payments on the sale of lots, Broad filled in the islands and was joined in the venture by Benjamin N. Kane. He sketched the plans for what he called Bay Harbor Islands, designing it in two pieces. One piece for single family and one for multiple family.

The town was incorporated in 1947, and Broad was elected as mayor, serving 26 consecutive years until his retirement in 1973.

When he finally relinquished the job, he reminisced about the first election, one that was uninhibited by complications like voters. Broad joked:

It was the easiest election I ever experienced - Seven hundred and fifty lots elected me unanimously.

==== "Shepard's Folly" ====
Also in 1947, the Legislature authorized him to build a causeway at 125th Street and Biscayne Boulevard. The $2.5 million road was to be financed by self-liquidating bonds without expense to taxpayers. His detractors dubbed the causeway "Shepard's Folly," but he persevered and it was completed in 1951. The bridge now carries the name of the Broad Causeway.

=== Educational institutions ===
Shepard Broad's other community activities include serving as a member of the Board of Governors at the Shepard Broad College of Law of Nova Southeastern University, earning honorary degrees from Nova University and Barry University, participating in the leadership of several hospitals, and endowing the Shepard and Ruth Broad Center for the Performing Arts of Barry University.

Shepard Broad and his wife Ruth, through the legacy of The Shepard Broad Foundation, Inc., have given generous support to major universities and hospitals throughout the world including: Florida International University, Barry University, University of Florida, Florida State University and the Shepard Broad College of Law at Nova Southeastern University.

In 1995, he donated $174,350 for computer equipment at the new Ruth K. Broad Bay Harbor Elementary School, which was named for his late wife.
