= George Moraitis =

American politician

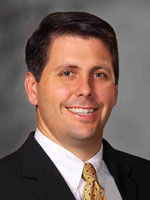
- Official portrait, 2011

Member of the Florida House of Representatives
- In office November 2, 2010 – November 6, 2018
- Preceded by: Ellyn Setnor Bogdanoff
- Succeeded by: Chip LaMarca
- Constituency: 91st district (2010–2012); 93rd district (2012–2018)

Personal details
- Born: October 29, 1970 (age 55) Fort Lauderdale, Florida, U.S.
- Party: Republican
- Spouse: Heather Thompson
- Children: 2
- Education: United States Naval Academy (BS); University of Florida (JD)

George R. Moraitis Jr. (born October 29, 1970) is a Republican politician and a former member of the Florida House of Representatives, representing the 93rd District, which stretches from Boca Raton to Hollywood in eastern Broward County, from 2012 to 2018. Moraitis previously represented the 91st District from 2010 to 2012.

Moraitis was a candidate in the Republican primary for Florida's 23rd congressional district in the 2026 election.

== Education and early career ==
George Moraitis was born in Fort Lauderdale, and he attended Fort Lauderdale High School before joining the United States Naval Academy, where he graduated with a degree in political science in 1992. Following his graduation, he served in the United States Navy from 1992 to 2000, where he received the Navy Commendation Medal, the Navy Achievement Medal, the Navy Expeditionary Medal, and the Navy Arctic Service Ribbon. In 2000, he retired from the Navy and joined the United States Navy Reserve, where he continues to serve, and attended the University of Florida College of Law, graduating with a Juris Doctor degree in 2002. Prior to running for office, Moraitis practiced real estate law in private practice for eight years.

== Florida House of Representatives ==
In 2010, incumbent Republican State Representative Ellyn Setnor Bogdanoff declined to seek another term in the House, instead opting to run for the Florida State Senate. Moraitis ran to succeed her in the 91st District, which included eastern Broward County and a few precincts in southern Palm Beach County, and narrowly won the nomination of the Republican Party against David Maymon and Yomin Postelnik, winning 48% of the vote to Maymon's 46% and Postelnik's 6%. in the general election, Moraitis faced off against Barbra A. Stern, the Democratic nominee, whom he defeated, winning 63% of the vote.

When Florida House districts were redrawn in 2012, Moraitis opted to seek a second term in the 93rd District, which included most of the territory that he had represented in the 91st District, swapping the Boynton Beach sections in Palm Beach County for a larger portion of Broward County. He won the nomination of his party unopposed, and faced Democratic nominee Gerri Ann Capotosto in the general election. Moraitis and Capotosto adopted opposite positions on job creation, with Moraitis favoring a "focus on job creation by supporting programs such as economic incentives for businesses moving to Florida," while Capotosto favored investments in "Wi-Fi and electrical infrastructure to attract tech companies." He was endorsed by the South Florida Sun-Sentinel for re-election, which observed, "Moraitis would continue to push for state aid for Port Everglades, an economic engine for both the district and the larger region." Ultimately, Moraitis was re-elected over Capotosto, receiving 55% of the vote.

In February 2018, after a mass school shooting in a nearby district in Broward County, Moraitis skipped a vote that would have brought HB 219 to the Florida House floor. The bill aimed to ban semiautomatic rifles like the one used to kill 17 people in the Stoneman Douglas High School shooting.

In March 2018, Moraitis was the only representative in the Florida House of Representatives who voted against a bill that prevented children under the age of 17 from marrying. Moraitis, referring to the previous law permitting child marriage at any age in the event of pregnancy, was quoted as saying that the law was "very good, in my opinion, a very carefully crafted balance" and "there's literally only a handful of cases that would fall under what I would say are potentially abusive" as his reasons for voting against it.
