= Ellyn Setnor Bogdanoff =

American politician

Ellyn Bogdanoff
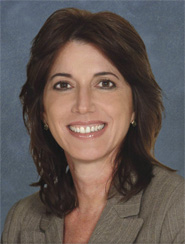

Member of the Florida Senate from the 25th district
- In office November 2, 2010 – October 11, 2012
- Preceded by: Jeff Atwater
- Succeeded by: Joseph Abruzzo

Member of the Florida House of Representatives from the 91st district
- In office January 6, 2004 – November 2, 2010
- Preceded by: Connie Mack IV
- Succeeded by: George Moraitis

Personal details
- Born: October 17, 1959 (age 66) North Miami, Florida, U.S.
- Party: Republican
- Education: University of Florida (BA); Nova Southeastern University (JD)
- Profession: Attorney

Ellyn Setnor Bogdanoff (born October 17, 1959) is an American politician and attorney. A member of the Republican Party, Bogdanoff served as a member of the Florida Senate from the 25th District, running from West Palm Beach to Fort Lauderdale, from 2010 to 2012. Prior to this, Bogdanoff served as a member of the Florida House of Representatives from the 91st district from 2004 to 2010.

== Early life and education ==
Setnor's sister, Anita Byer, works in the insurance industry. Bogdanoff received her bachelor's degree from the University of Florida in 1980 and her Juris Doctor degree from the Shepard Broad College of Law in 2003.

== Early political career ==
In 1996, Ellyn Bogdanoff began her political career by running for the Broward County School Board as the Republican nominee, though she lost to Democratic incumbent Miriam Oliphant. She ran for the Florida Senate in a special election in March 1998 to replace Ken Jenne, who had resigned his seat in the Senate when Governor Lawton Chiles appointed him as Broward County Sheriff, but lost to Steven Geller, a State Representative and the Democratic nominee.

== Florida House of Representatives ==
Ellyn Bogdanoff ran for the Florida House of Representatives in July 2004 following the resignation of incumbent Representative Connie Mack IV, who had retired to focus on his ultimately successful campaign for Congress. She emerged victorious from a crowded field of seven candidates and was re-elected unopposed later that year. In 2006, Ellyn Bogdanoff fended off a spirited challenge from Democratic opponent Christian Chiari, in which she won with just 55% of the vote; two years later, she defeated Chiari again in a rematch by a larger margin.

== Florida Senate ==
When incumbent State Senator Jeff Atwater was term-limited in his position and ran for Chief Financial Officer of Florida in 2010, an open seat arose, and Ellyn Bogdanoff defeated fellow State Representative Carl Domino to win the Republican nomination. In the general election, she overwhelmingly defeated the Democratic nominee, State Representative Kelly Skidmore, and independent candidate Miranda Rosenberg.

=== 2012 election ===
In 2012, Florida Senate districts were reconfigured, and Ellyn Bogdanoff was drawn into a district with Democratic State Senator Maria Sachs, and a competitive election ensued. The Palm Beach Post criticized Ellyn Bogdanoff for "reckless" votes to allow the privatization of state prisons and to allow a takeover of public schools by charter school companies while the Miami Herald, in endorsing Sachs, called it "unfortunate" that Ellyn Bogdanoff "cannot simply run on her own record."

On the other hand, the South Florida Sun-Sentinel endorsed her, praising her as "smart, a bit of a wonk, hard-working and tenacious when dealing with legislative issues." In a race that emerged as the top target of both the Democrats and the Republicans, costing up to $1.5 million, Ellyn Bogdanoff, who received 47% of the vote, was narrowly defeated by Sachs, who received 53%.

== National politics ==
Bogdanoff was a vocal supporter of John McCain's 2008 presidential campaign. During the 2008 election, Bogdanoff served state co-chairwoman of Jewish outreach for McCain's campaign, and later became chair of the Broward Elected Officials for McCain network. In the 2012 Republican primary, Bogdanoff supported Jon Huntsman's presidential campaign.

== Later career ==
Setnor Bogdanoff later became a shareholder with Becker & Poliakoff, a law firm based in Fort Lauderdale. Bogdanoff has criticized fire marshals for pressuring condominiums to renovate their sprinkler systems, arguing that the "installation of a full sprinkler system [comes] at a significant cost to the residents" of condominiums. Bogdanoff remains active in Florida politics, and donated to Democratic representative Michael Grieco's reelection fund in 2021.

Florida House of Representatives
Preceded by Connie Mack IV	Member of the Florida House of Representatives from the 91st district 2004–2010	Succeeded by George Moraitis
Florida Senate
Preceded by Jeff Atwater	Member of the Florida Senate from the 25th district 2010–2012	Succeeded by Joseph Abruzzo
