= The Dori Slosberg Foundation =

- Formation: 2004
- Type: 501(c)(3)
- Headquarters: Boca Raton, Florida, U.S.
- CEO: Irving Slosberg
- Website: dorisaveslives.org

The Dori Slosberg Highway Safety Foundation is a non-governmental, non-profit public service organization dedicated to traffic safety. The foundation is named in memory of Dori Slosberg, the daughter of State Representative Irving Slosberg and twin sister of Representative Emily Slosberg, who was killed in a car crash. The foundation has been instrumental in promoting highway safety in Florida through programs including Staying Alive on 95 and Survive the Drive.

The foundation campaigned for The Dori Slosberg and Katie Marchetti Safety Belt Law, which was passed in 2009. The law gives police the authority to pull over drivers solely for not wearing a seatbelt.

In 2022, the Dori Slosberg Foundation reported revenue of $22.6k.
