= American Task Force Argentina =

The American Task Force Argentina is a group of American stakeholders that seek the full payment of Argentine debt to holdouts and vulture funds. The Argentine government compared it with an actual task force, operating against Argentina.

== See also ==
- Argentine debt restructuring
