= Thomas Armstrong (Florida politician) =

American politician

Tom Armstrong
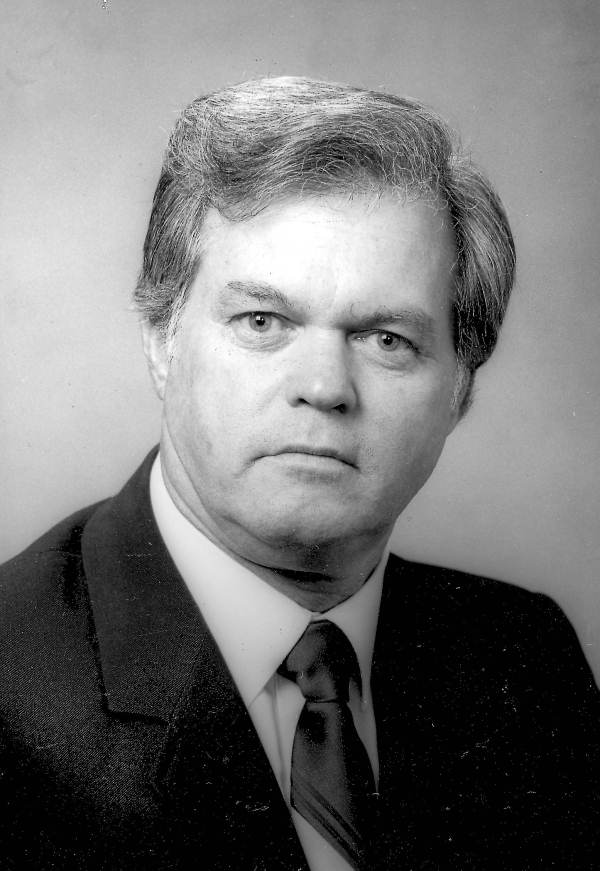

Member of the Florida House of Representatives
- In office 1982–1986

Personal details
- Born: 1937 (age 88–89)
- Party: Democratic
- Spouse: Rae Carol
- Occupation: General Contractor

Thomas H. Armstrong (born 1937) was an American politician in the state of Florida.

Armstrong was a contractor and lives in Plantation, Florida. He served in the Florida House of Representatives for the 96th district from 1982 to 1986, as a Democrat.
