= Joseph H. Titone =

American politician, defended Jean-Luc Brunel (born 1946)

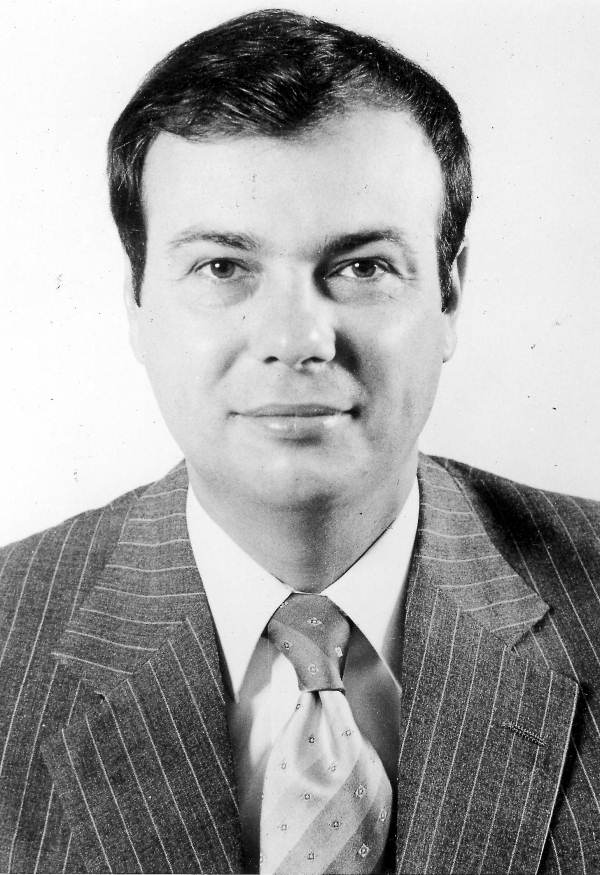
- Titone in 1982

Member of the Florida House of Representatives from the 89th district
- In office 1982–1988
- Preceded by: Mary Ellen Hawkins
- Succeeded by: Ben Graber

Personal details
- Born: June 14, 1946 (age 80) New York, U.S.
- Party: Democratic
- Spouse: Lila Impellizeri
- Children: Jackie Sandler
- Relatives: Sadie Sandler (granddaughter); Sunny Sandler (granddaughter)
- Education: Pace University; Brooklyn Law School

Joseph H. Titone (born June 14, 1946) is an American politician. He served as a Democratic member for the 89th district of the Florida House of Representatives. He also worked as a lawyer after his political career where he famously defended Jean-Luc Brunel, a business partner and close friend of Jeffrey Epstein in 2015.

== Life and career ==
Titone was born on June 14, 1946, in New York to Anthony Titone (1913–2005) and Vita "Rita" (née Ditta; 1919–2005) Titone. He attended Pace University and Brooklyn Law School. He has two brothers and one sister.

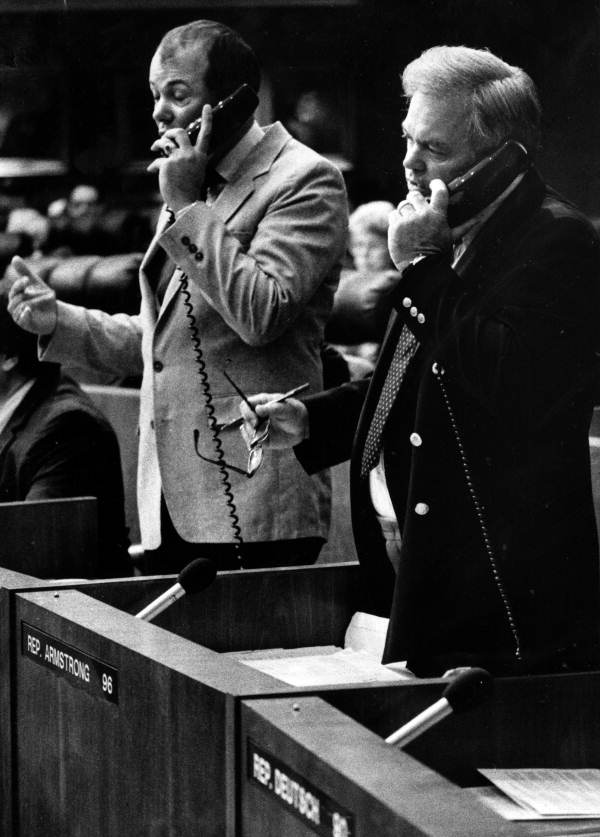
Titone (left) with Thomas Armstrong, 1986

In 1982, Titone was elected to represent the 89th district of the Florida House of Representatives, succeeding Mary Ellen Hawkins. He served until 1988, when he was succeeded by Ben Graber.

In 2015, he legally defended Jean-Luc Brunel, an associate of the wealthy sex trafficker Jeffrey Epstein. Brunel flew on the Lolita Express at least 25 times between the 1990s and 2010s.

== Criminal history ==
Titone was arrested for carrying a Colt .38 special revolver in his brief case into a courthouse, in 2021. He claimed it was an accident and intended on taking them to the range in his briefcase, which never occurred. He was charged with unlicensed carrying of a concealed firearm which is a third-degree felony.

== Personal life ==
Titone is married to Lila Impellizeri.

Through their daughter Jackie Sandler, actor and comedian Adam Sandler is his son-in-law. His granddaughters are actresses Sadie Sandler and Sunny Sandler.
