= Shepard Broad College of Law =

US law school associated with Nova Southeastern University

Coordinates: 28.6828°N 81.3971°W

Nova Southeastern University Shepard Broad College of Law
- Established: 1974; 52 years ago
- School type: Private law school
- Parent endowment: US $47.6 million
- Dean: Olympia R. Duhart
- Location: Davie, Florida, U.S.
- Enrollment: 620
- Faculty: 41 full-time Five Academic Success Program instructors 45 adjunct
- USNWR ranking: 178-196 out of 196 (Bottom 9% at most); 51 (tie) out of 68 part-time programs (2025)
- Bar pass rate: 71.1% (July 2025 first-time takers)
- Website: law.nova.edu

Shepard Broad College of Law (also referred to as NSU Law and Nova Law) is the law school of Nova Southeastern University, located on the university's main campus in Davie, Florida. The school offers full-time day and part-time evening programs. The law school was ranked ##178-196 in Best Law Schools by US News & World Report in 2024.

== History ==
Founded in 1974, the school was named for lawyer, banker, and philanthropist Shepard Broad who was a member of the school's Board of Governors and who provided financial support. The law building's name recognizes Leo Goodwin Sr.'s large donations. The school received approval by the American Bar Association in 1975.

== Admissions ==
For the class entering in 2024, the law school accepted 56.6% of applicants, with 28.0% of those accepted enrolling. The median enrollee had a 153 LSAT score and 3.52 undergraduate GPA. One student was not included in the GPA calculation. Its 25th/75th percentile LSAT scores and GPAs were 150/156 and 3.29/3.70.

== Employment ==
According to the schools's official ABA-required disclosures for 2023 graduates, within ten months after graduation 112 (68.2%) of the 164 member graduating class were employed in full-time positions requiring bar passage (i.e. as attorneys) and four (2.4%) were employed in full-time JD advantage positions. Attorney positions were in various size law firms, most being in 1-10 attorney firms. One graduate obtained a local or state judicial clerkship, and one obtained a federal clerkship. 34 members (20.7%) of the class were not employed in any capacity.

== Notable alumni ==
- Keith Sonderling (JD 2008), United States Secretary of Labor
- Ellyn Setnor Bogdanoff (JD 2003), former member of the Florida Senate
- Jared Moskowitz (JD 2007), member of the United States House of Representatives for Florida's 23rd congressional district
- Hillary Cassel (JD 2006), member of the Florida House of Representatives
- Carl Domino (JD 2014), earned Juris Doctor degree at the age of 70, former member of the Florida House of Representatives
- Kristine Lefebvre (JD 1996), attorney, appeared nude in Playboy, contestant on the reality show The Apprentice
- Bradford Cohen Defence Lawyer involved in several high profile cases representing hip-hop artists including Drake, Lil Wayne & Kodak Black.
