= Joseph F. Titone =

American politician

Member of the New Hampshire House of Representatives from the Rockingham 14th district
- In office 1984–1986

Personal details
- Party: Republican

Joseph F. Titone is an American politician. He served as a Republican member for the Rockingham 14th district of the New Hampshire House of Representatives.
