= Ron Klein =

American politician and lawyer (born 1957)

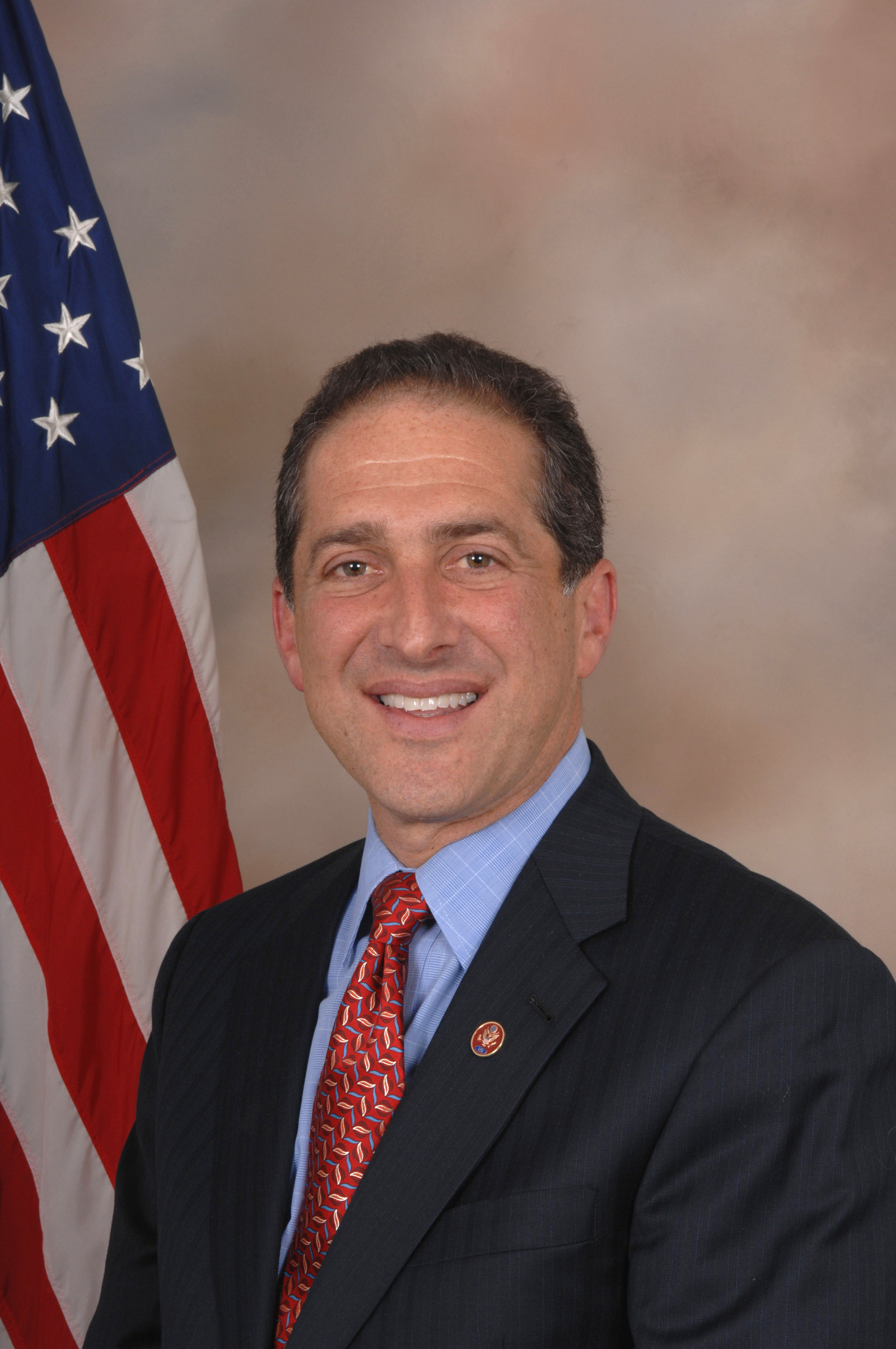

Member of the U.S. House of Representatives from Florida's 22nd district
- In office January 3, 2007 – January 3, 2011
- Preceded by: Clay Shaw
- Succeeded by: Allen West

Minority Leader of the Florida Senate
- In office November 2002 – November 2004
- Preceded by: Tom Rossin
- Succeeded by: Les Miller

Member of the Florida Senate
- In office November 5, 1996 – November 7, 2006
- Preceded by: Robert Wexler
- Succeeded by: Ted Deutch
- Constituency: 28th district (1996–2002); 30th district (2002–2007)

Member of the Florida House of Representatives from the 89th district
- In office November 3, 1992 – November 5, 1996
- Preceded by: Benjamin Graber
- Succeeded by: Barry Silver

Personal details
- Born: Ronald Jason Klein; July 10, 1957 (age 69) Cleveland, Ohio, U.S.
- Party: Democratic
- Spouse: Dori Dragin
- Education: Ohio State University (BA); Case Western Reserve University (JD)

Ronald Jason Klein (/ˈklaɪn/ KLYNE; born July 10, 1957) is an American politician and lawyer who is a former member of the United States House of Representatives for Florida's 22nd congressional district. He is a member of the Democratic Party and chairs the Jewish Democratic Council of America. He previously served in the Florida House of Representatives and the Florida Senate. He is currently employed by the law firm Holland & Knight.

== Early life, education and career ==
Klein was born in Cleveland, Ohio. He graduated from Cleveland Heights High School in 1975, and attended Ohio State University, graduating with a Bachelor of Arts degree in political science in 1979. While at Ohio State, Klein became a member of the Alpha Epsilon Pi fraternity. Klein also spent time during college as an intern at the Ohio General Assembly. Klein attended Case Western Reserve University School of Law and graduated with a J.D. degree in 1982.

== Florida Legislature ==
In 1992, Klein defeated ten-year incumbent Steve Press in the Democratic primary to win a seat in the Florida House of Representatives. Klein was elected to the Florida Senate in 1996, and served as minority whip in 1998 and as minority leader in 2002–2004.

== U.S. House of Representatives ==
=== Tenure ===
On September 29, 2008, Klein voted for the Emergency Economic Stabilization Act of 2008 During the 111th Congress, he voted for the American Recovery and Reinvestment Act of 2009, American Clean Energy and Security Act of 2009, and both healthcare bills, Affordable Health Care for America Act which was the House bill and Patient Protection and Affordable Care Act which was the Senate bill. He also voted for the reconciliation bill and Dodd-Frank.

=== Committee assignments ===
- Committee on Financial Services
  - Subcommittee on Capital Markets, Insurance and Government Sponsored Enterprises
  - Subcommittee on Financial Institutions and Consumer Credit
- Committee on Foreign Affairs
  - Subcommittee on Terrorism, Nonproliferation and Trade
  - Subcommittee on the Middle East and South Asia
  - Subcommittee on the Western Hemisphere

== Political campaigns ==
=== 2006 ===
Klein ran for a seat in the U.S. House of Representatives in Florida's 22nd congressional district against 13-term Republican incumbent Clay Shaw. Although Shaw won re-election easily in the 2004 election (his opponent dropped out before the election), John Kerry carried the district by a margin on 50-48 percent over George W. Bush in 2004.

On Election Day 2006, Klein defeated Shaw by a margin of 51%-48% and assumed office when the 110th Congress convened on January 4, 2007. Klein was aided by voter discontent over the war in Iraq and the scandal involving Republican Congressman Mark Foley in the neighboring district.

On December 18, 2007, the magazine Politico named Ron Klein as its "Rookie of the Year", citing his willingness to cross party lines and his ability to get major legislation passed.

=== 2008 ===
In 2008, Klein won his race against Republican nominee Allen West with 54.7% of the vote.

Klein voted with a majority of his Democratic colleagues 97.9% of the time during the 111th Congress. The nonpartisan National Journal rated him as 58.3 percent liberal and 41.7 conservative based on his voting record.

=== 2010 ===
Klein lost his reelection bid to Republican nominee Allen West in a rematch of the 2008 race.

== Post-congressional career ==
After leaving Congress, Klein was hired by law firm Holland & Knight.

"Certainly having been a participant or part of one of the busiest congresses in decades, where large pieces of legislation have passed and will be evolving for many, many years to come, this moment becomes a unique time to take [to the private sector] the experiences of having served on the Financial Services Committee or having been involved in passing health care," he said. "It sort of allows me to be in a unique place to understand that." . . .

The wave of new rule-making "appears to create a lot of work and opportunity for businesses that want to make sure that they have a strategic business advantage in the future, that they're planning for the future and that they can help shape those laws and legislation as they develop."

According to Politico, "Klein's background as a corporate lawyer and former state and federal lawmaker means he'll be selling his ability to provide legal, political, policy and business advice to prospective clients.

== Personal life ==
Ron married Dori Dragin in 1982 and they moved to Boca Raton, Florida, in 1985. They have two children.

== See also ==
- Homeowner's Defense Act
- List of Jewish members of the United States Congress

Florida Senate
Preceded by Tom Rossin	Minority Leader of the Florida Senate; 2002–2004	Succeeded by Les Miller
U.S. House of Representatives
Preceded by Clay Shaw	Member of the U.S. House of Representatives from Florida's 22nd congressional district 2007–2011	Succeeded by Allen West
U.S. order of precedence (ceremonial)
Preceded by Katherine Harris as Former U.S. Representative	Order of precedence of the United States as Former U.S. Representative	Succeeded by Steve Southerland as Former U.S. Representative
