= Florida's 28th Senate district =

American legislative district

Florida's 28th State Senate district
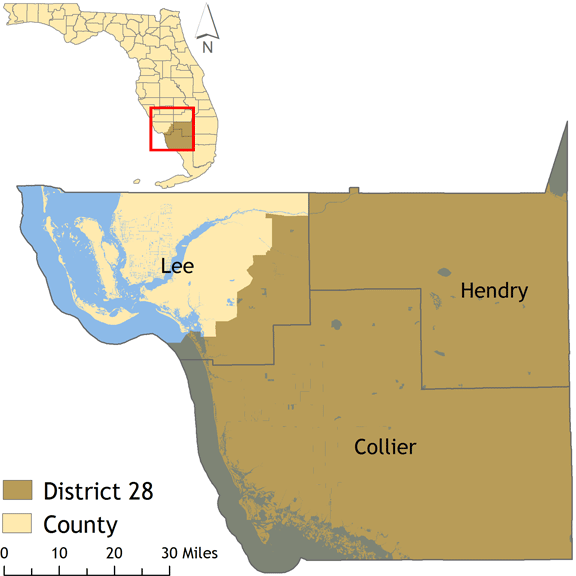
Senator
Kathleen Passidomo
- Demographics: 56% White; 8% Black; 32% Hispanic; 1% Asian; ~0% Native American; ~0% Hawaiian/Pacific Islander; ~0% Other
- Population (2022): 550,136

Florida's 28th Senate district elects one member of the Florida Senate. The district comprises Collier, Hendry, and parts of Lee county. Its current senator is Republican Kathleen Passidomo.

== Senators ==
- Francis A. Hendry, 1865-1867
- C. B. McClenny, 1879-1881
- S. M. Hendricks, 1883-1885
- J. M. Fraser, 1887
- Charles F. A. Bielby, 1889
- W. H. Bristol, 1891-1893
- Charles Daugherty, 1895-1897
- Frank W. Sams, 1899-1909
- James W. Perkins, 1911
- (Not represented, 1912 ex)
- Jacob B. Conrad, 1913-1915
- James E. Alexander, 1917
- Lincoln Hulley, 1918-1921
- Howard G. Putnam, 1923-1929
- W. C. Chowning, 1931-1933
- F. B. Nordman Jr., 1935-1937
- Hubert A. Price, 1939-1941
- L. A. Coleman, 1943-1945
- Walter G. Walker, 1947-1949
- E. William Gautier, 1951-1965
- Wilbur H. Boyd, 1966(D)
- Lawton Chiles, 1967-1970 (D)
- Bob Brannen, 1970-1972 (D) (resigned, Feb. 16, 1972)
- Curtis Peterson, 1972 (special election, March 22, 1972)
- Tom Johnson, 1973-1974 (R)
- Don Childers, 1975-1990 (D)
- Robert Wexler, 1991-1996 (D)
- Ron Klein, 1997-2002 (D)
- Ken Pruitt, 2003-2009 (R)
- Nancy Detert, 2009-2016 (R)
- Kathleen Passidomo, 2016-present (R)
