= Fort Meade (disambiguation) =

Fort Meade is a United States military fort in Maryland.

Fort Meade may also refer to:

- Fort Meade, Florida, a city in Polk County, Florida, United States
- Fort Meade Historic District, in Fort Meade, Florida, United States
- Fort Meade, Maryland, a census-designated place (CDP) in Anne Arundel County, Maryland, United States
- Fort Meade (South Dakota), an historic United States cavalry fort near Sturgis, South Dakota, United States
- Fort Meade National Cemetery, a national cemetery near Sturgis, South Dakota, United States
