= 2026 Florida Commissioner of Agriculture election =

- November 3, 2026
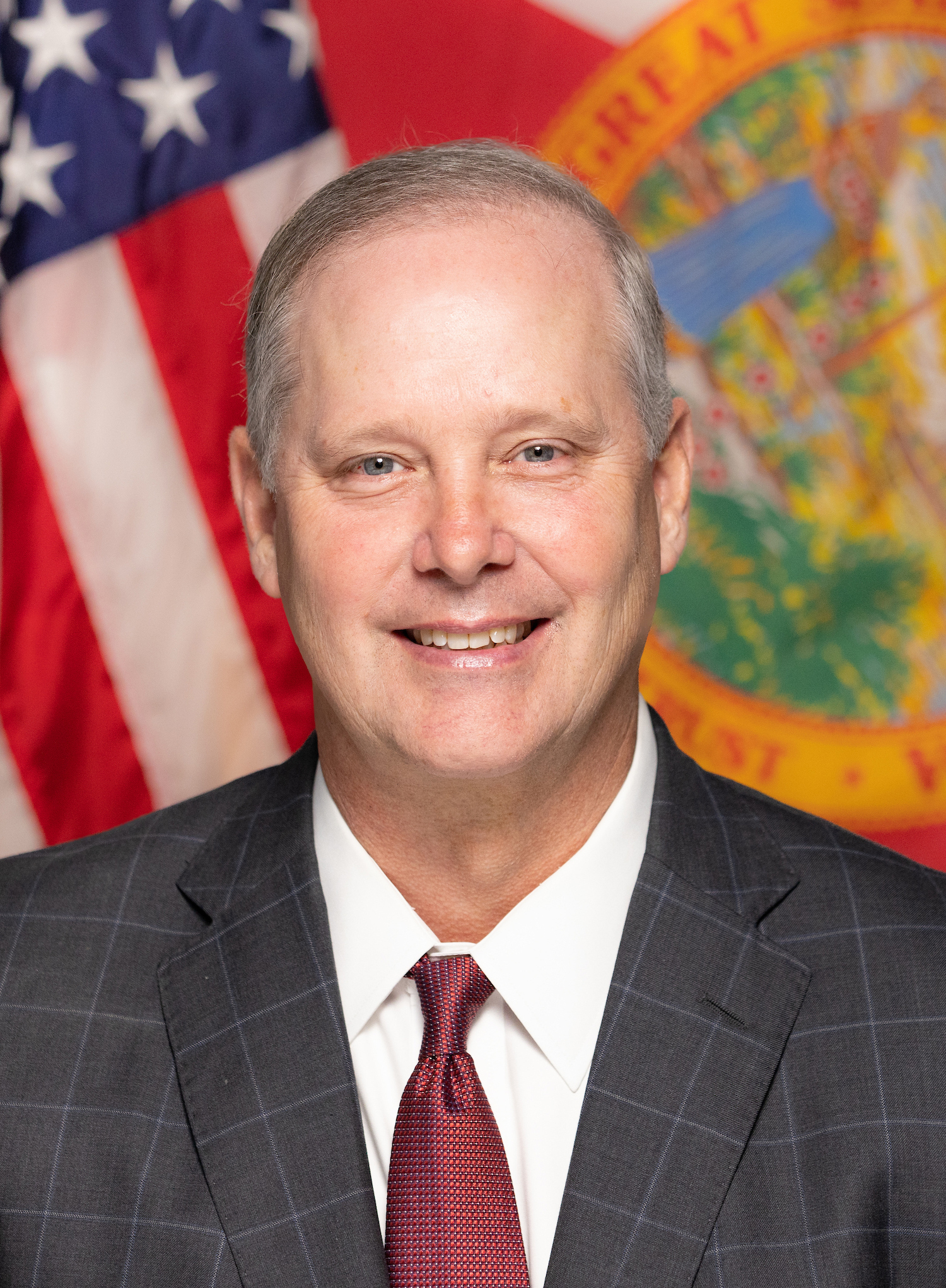

Nominee	Wilton Simpson	Joey Mendoza Atkins
Party	Republican	Democratic
Popular vote	4,160,835	3,984,649
Percentage	51.1%	48.9%
- Simpson: 50–60% 60–70% 70–80% 80–90% Atkins: 50–60% 60–70%
Agriculture Commissioner before election
Wilton Simpson
Republican
Elected Agriculture Commissioner
Wilton Simpson
Republican

The 2026 Florida Commissioner of Agriculture election took place on November 3, 2026, to elect the Florida Commissioner of Agriculture. The primary election took place on August 18th, 2026. Incumbent Republican Agriculture Commissioner Wilton Simpson flipped the seat in 2022 and ran for re-election.

== Republican primary ==
=== Candidates ===
==== Nominee ====
- Wilton Simpson, incumbent commissioner (2023–present)

==== Eliminated in primary ====
- Matt The Welder, welder and influencer (listed on ballot as Matt Taylor)

=== Endorsements ===
Wilton Simpson

Executive branch officials

- Donald Trump, president of the United States (2017–2021, 2025–present)

U.S. representatives

- Scott Franklin, Florida's 18th congressional district (Note: Numbered as the 15th from 2021–2023) (2021–present)

=== Results ===
Primary results by county: Simpson: 50–60%; 60–70%; 70–80%

Republican primary results
Party	Candidate	Votes	%
Republican	Wilton Simpson (incumbent)	1,110,689	68.9
Republican	Matt Taylor	501,100	31.1
Total votes		1,611,789	100.0

== Democratic primary ==
=== Candidates ===
==== Nominee ====
- Joey Mendoza Atkins, lawyer and nominee for Florida's 26th congressional district in 2024 (previously ran for U.S. Senate)

==== Eliminated in primary ====
- Donald A. "Don" Prichard, police captain

=== Results ===
Primary results by county: Atkins: 50–60%; 60–70%; 70–80%; Prichard: 50–60%

Democratic primary results
Party	Candidate	Votes	%
Democratic	Joey Mendoza Atkins	716,467	60.3
Democratic	Donald A. "Don" Prichard	472,100	39.7
Total votes		1,188,567	100.0

== General election ==
=== Post-primary endorsements ===
Wilton Simpson (R)

Newspapers

- Miami Herald

=== Polling ===
Poll source	Date(s) administered	Sample size (Note: Key: A – all adults RV – registered voters LV – likely voters V – unclear)	Margin of error	Wilton Simpson (R)	Joey Mendoza Atkins (D)	Other	Undecided
Targoz Market Research (Note: Poll sponsored by the James Madison Institute, a conservative think tank)	September 28 – October 4, 2026	847 (LV)	–	50%	39%	3% (Note: "Another candidate" with 3%)	8%
Targoz Market Research	September 28 – October 4, 2026	1,171 (RV)	± 2.77%	45%	36%	3%	15%

=== Results ===
2026 Florida Commissioner of Agriculture election
Party	Candidate	Votes	%	±%
Republican	Wilton Simpson (incumbent)			
Democratic	Joey Mendoza Atkins			
Write-in				
Total votes			100.0%	

== See also ==
- 2026 Florida elections
  - 2026 Florida gubernatorial election
  - 2026 Florida Attorney General election
  - 2026 Florida Chief Financial Officer election
  - 2026 Florida Senate election
  - 2026 Florida House of Representatives election

== Notes ==
Partisan clients
