= Rev. Wm James Reid House =

- U.S. Historic district – Contributing property
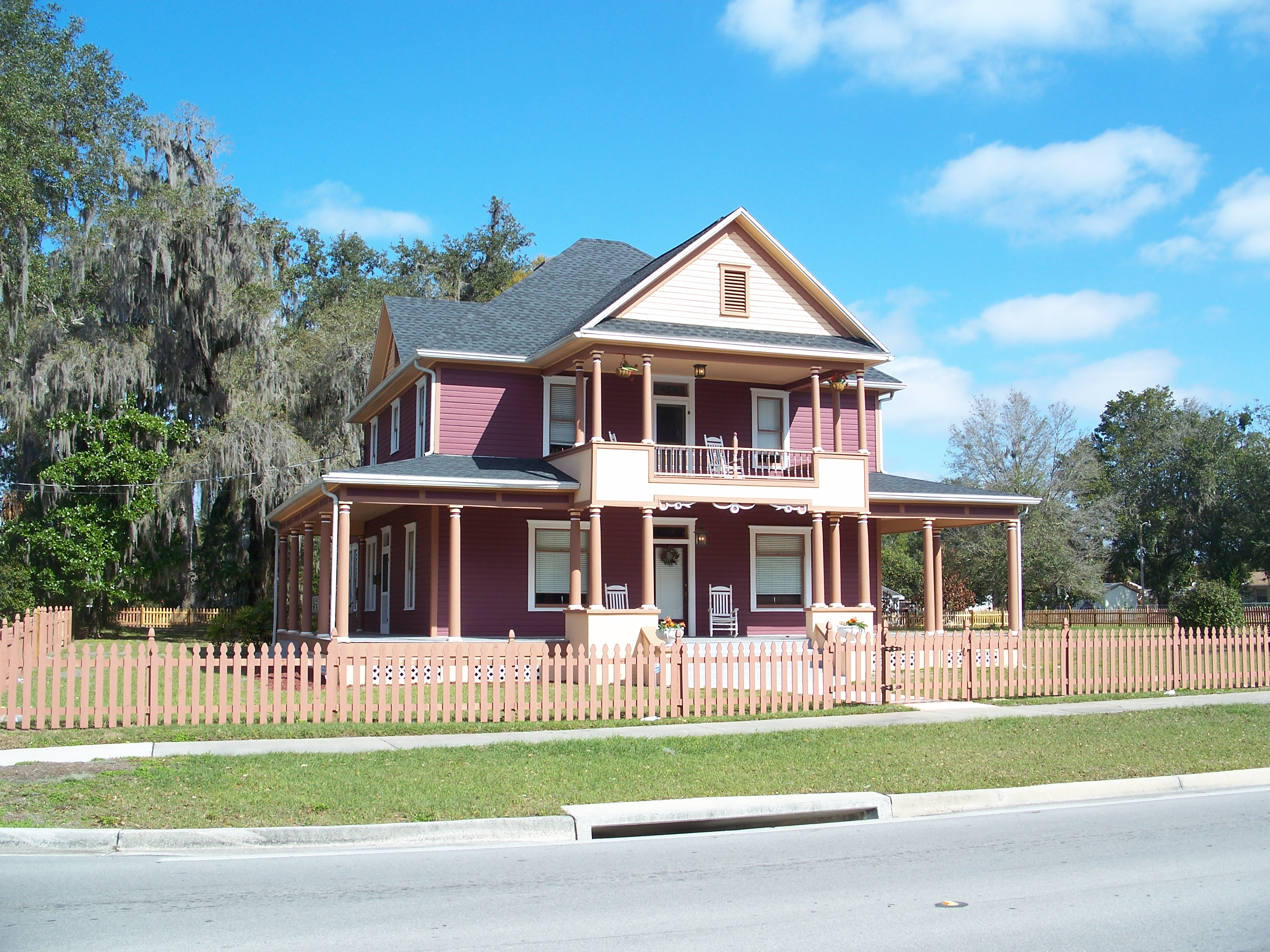
- Location: Fort Meade, Florida
- Coordinates: 27.75228°N 81.79577°W
- Built: Circa 1900
- Architectural style: Frame Vernacular with Colonial Revival influences
- Part of: Fort Meade Historic District (ID94000781)
- Added to NRHP: July 29, 1994

The Rev. Wm James Reid House is a historic frame vernacular home in Fort Meade, Florida and was built between 1899–1914.

The Reid House was used for the HBO motion picture film Judgment featuring Blythe Danner, Keith Carradine, Jack Warden, and David Strathairn.

== Historic details ==
The Wm. James Reid house is a three-story Colonial Revival, in it original form since its conception in the early 1900s. The home features four parlors with high ceilings, original plaster, original doors and transoms, wave lead glass, cedar frame, and heart pine floors. All the original features from the sliding pocket doors to the copper handles are well preserved.

== Location ==
The Wm. James Reid House is located within the bounds of the Fort Meade Historic District which is a U.S. historic district (designated as such on July 29, 1994) located in Fort Meade, Florida. The district is bounded by North 3rd Street, Orange Avenue, South 3rd Street and Sand Mountain Road. It contains 151 historic buildings.
