= Old Fort Meade School House =

- U.S. Historic district – Contributing property
- Location within Florida Location within the United States
- Location: Fort Meade, Florida
- Coordinates: 27.751782°N 81.8049°W
- Built: 1885
- Architectural style: Frame Vernacular with Colonial Revival influences
- Added to NRHP: July 29, 1994

The Fort Meade Historical Museum is housed in the Fort Meade Academy Fort Meade, Florida, and is located on the corner of Tecumseh Avenue and Broadway St. The structure is not the first indoor school. Records show children held classes at the Fort, in businesses and homes. The first dedicated school building was "The Little White School House," which was located at 700 E. Broadway St. where the current water tower is located.

== History ==
The schoolhouse, built-in 1885, was originally located on the N.E. corner of S. Oak Ave. And E. 1st St.

  When the Fort Meade High School was built on that block facing E. Broadway, the Academy closed and was moved to Magnolia at Lanier. 
  Later, the structure was donated to the City of Fort Meade and moved from corner of  South Lanier Avenue and Magnolia St.to the present location in 1989.[1]

Following its tenure as a school, this building served as a private residence and then a boarding house. The extensive renovation took place in 1990 and 1991 on the first floor. The building was then inactive until 1998, when a small group of volunteers took an interest and started to put some of the collection artifacts into place.

In 1999 refurbishing of the second floor began to accommodate the extensive collection of the Historical Society and in September 2000, the museum was opened to the public. Many of the treasures within the museum were donated by descendants of the pioneer families of the community. The museum also holds a pictorial collection of the historic homes that can be found throughout Fort Meade.

== Location ==
The Old Fort Meade School House is located within the bounds of the Fort Meade Historic District which is a U.S. historic district (designated as such on July 29, 1994) located in Fort Meade, Florida. The district is bounded by North 3rd Street, Orange Avenue, South 3rd Street and Sand Mountain Road. It contains 151 historic buildings.
