= W.O. Williams/R.C. McClellan House =

- U.S. Historic district – Contributing property
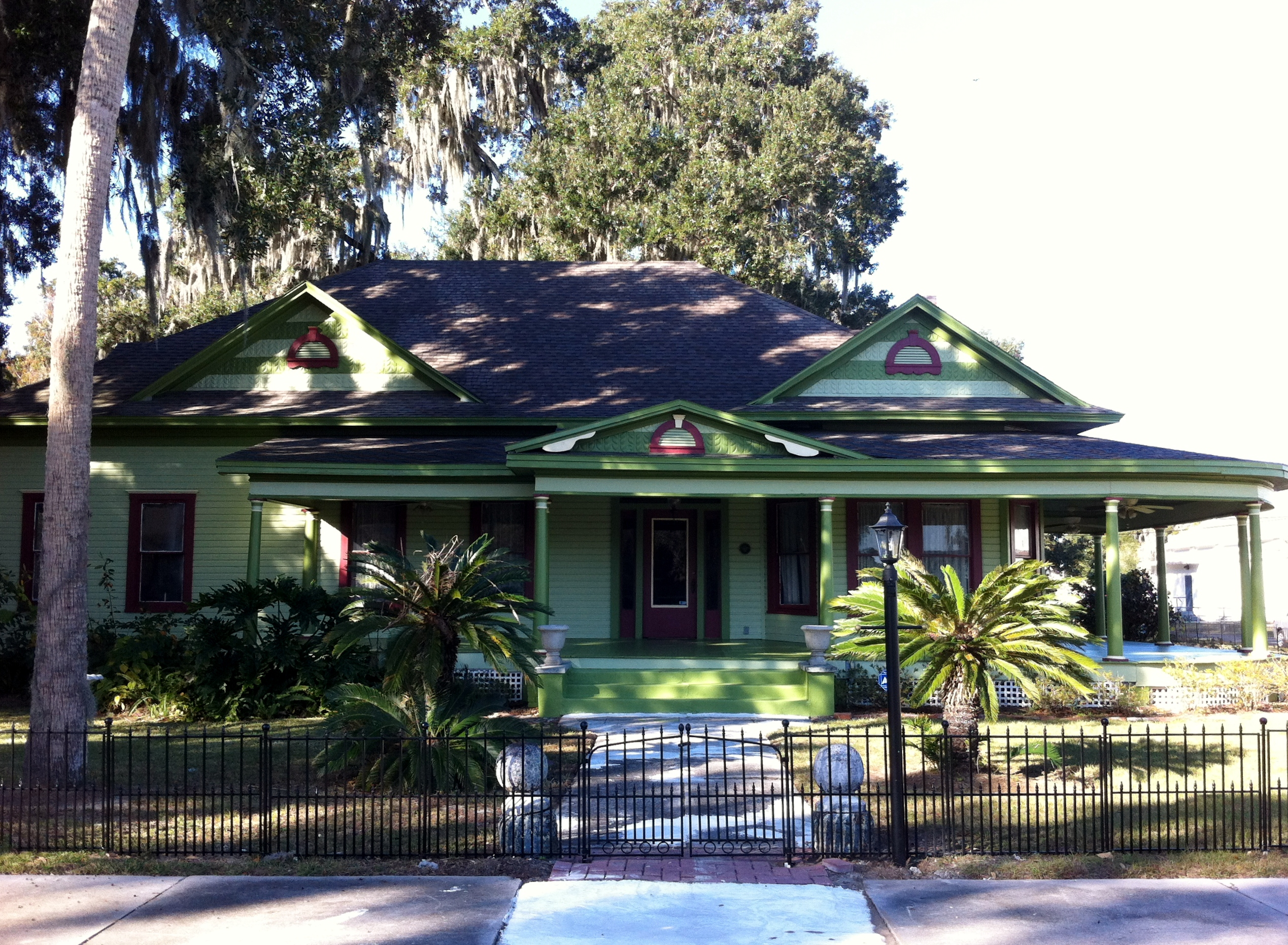
- Location: Fort Meade, Florida
- Coordinates: 27.75048°N 81.79762°W
- Built: Circa 1898
- Architectural style: Queen Anne/Colonial Revival
- Part of: Fort Meade Historic District (ID94000781)
- Added to NRHP: July 29, 1994

The W.O. Williams/R.C. McClellan House is an historic home in Fort Meade, Florida.

== History ==
This circa 1898 frame vernacular historical home with its beautiful Queen Anne/Colonial Revival influences is located at 100 S Oak Avenue (formally Francis Street) in Fort Meade, Florida. The home was once owned by a Florida State Congressman (William O Williams) and a Mayor (Rupert Charles McClellan). W.O Williams (1873–1920) was a Florida Congressman elected to the House of Representatives in 1918-1919. In addition, the home was owned by R.C. McClellan (1872–1943) who was Fort Meade's mayor in 1912 and the grandson of the late George E. McClellan, (1808–1866) a delegate of the Florida Constitutional Convention in 1838, which drafted Florida's constitution and bill of rights, leading the territory of Florida into statehood in 1845.

This Queen Anne Victorian home was later owned by George M. Heath, (1872–1942) who purchased the home in 1935. The Heath family sold the home in 1979, and by 2010, it was in major disrepair and at risk of being demolished. The home is now almost fully restored and is of museum quality, showcasing some of Fort Meade's rich history.

== Location ==
The W.O Williams/R.C. McClellan house is located within the bounds of the Fort Meade Historic District, which is a U.S. historic district (designated as such on July 29, 1994) located in Fort Meade, Florida. The district is bounded by North 3rd Street, Orange Avenue, South 3rd Street and Sand Mountain Road. It contains 151 historic buildings.
