= Fort Thompson =

Fort Thompson may refer to:

- Fort Thompson, South Dakota
- Fort Thompson, Columbia Department, which later became the City of Kamloops
- Fort Thompson, Florida, a military post during the Second Seminole War along the Caloosahatchee River
