= Patterson Park (disambiguation) =

Patterson Park is a public park in Baltimore, Maryland, in the United States.

Patterson Park may also refer to:

- Patterson Park (Fort Meade, Florida)
- Patterson Park (neighborhood), Baltimore, Maryland
- Patterson Park Avenue, a street in Baltimore
- Patterson State Park, a Pennsylvania state park
- Stuart Patterson Park, a park in Old North Dayton, Dayton, Ohio

== See also ==
- J. C. Love Field at Pat Patterson Park
- Jefferson Patterson Park & Museum
- Patterson Park-Highlandtown Historic District
