= Kathleen Passidomo =

American politician

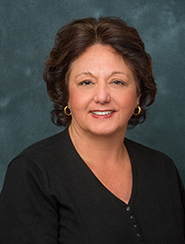
- Official portrait, 2015

President of the Florida Senate
- In office November 22, 2022 – November 19, 2024
- Preceded by: Wilton Simpson
- Succeeded by: Ben Albritton

Majority Leader of the Florida Senate
- In office November 26, 2018 – November 23, 2020
- Preceded by: Wilton Simpson
- Succeeded by: Debbie Mayfield

Member of the Florida Senate from the 28th district
- Incumbent
- Assumed office November 8, 2016
- Preceded by: Redistricted

Member of the Florida House of Representatives
- In office November 2, 2010 – November 8, 2016
- Preceded by: Tom Grady
- Succeeded by: Bob Rommel
- Constituency: 76th district (2010–2012); 106th district (2012–2016)

Personal details
- Born: May 19, 1953 (age 72) Jersey City, New Jersey, U.S.
- Party: Republican
- Spouse: John Passidomo (m. 1980; died 2024)
- Children: 3
- Education: Trinity Washington University (BA); Stetson University (JD)

Kathleen C. Passidomo (born May 19, 1953) is an American lawyer and politician who served as President of the Florida Senate. A Republican, she has represented the 28th district, which includes Collier, Hendry, and part of Lee County in Southwest Florida, since 2016. She previously served three terms in the Florida House of Representatives, representing the Naples area from 2010 to 2016. She served as Senate majority leader from 2018 to 2020 and Senate Rules chair from 2020 to 2022.

== Early life and legal career ==
Passidomo was born in Jersey City, New Jersey, and attended Trinity Washington University in Washington, D.C., graduating with a bachelor's degree in 1975. She graduated from the Stetson University College of Law with a J.D. degree in 1978 after moving to the state of Florida in 1976. She has resided in Naples since 1979. She entered into private law practice and is a founding partner of the law firm of Kelly, Passidomo & Alba LLP.

== Florida House of Representatives ==
In 2010, when incumbent Republican state representative Tom Grady declined to seek another term in the legislature, Passidomo ran to succeed him in the 76th District, which stretched from Naples Park to Chokoloskee on the western coast of Collier County. She won both the Republican primary and the general election entirely unopposed.

Following the reconfiguration of legislative districts in 2012, Passidomo was moved into the 106th District, which included most of the territory that she had previously represented in Collier County. In the Republican primary, she was opposed by David Bolduc, whom she easily defeated with 73% of the vote. Advancing to the general election, Passidomo faced Libertarian candidate Peter Richter, whom she defeated in a landslide, winning her second term in the legislature with 79% of the vote.

== Florida Senate ==
In 2016, Passidomo ran for the Florida Senate District 28 seat vacated by Garrett Richter, who was term limited. She defeated state representative Matt Hudson in the Republican primary, 58% to 42%, and faced only write-in candidates in the general election.

Passidomo was re-elected to a second term on November 6, 2018, after facing no primary challenger and winning 65% of the vote in the general election.

Passidomo is one of the founders of Maggie's List.

In 2020 she was an elector for Donald Trump.

In 2021, Passidomo was elected by her colleagues to preside over the upper chamber of the Florida Legislature during the 2022–2024 legislative term. She is the third woman in the 185-year history of the Florida Senate to serve as President.

== Personal life ==
Passidomo attended Stetson University in Gulfport, where she met her husband John. They had three daughters. He died in 2024 as a result of complications from a hiking accident.

She was elected by her peers to serve as president of both the Collier County Bar Association and the Collier County Women’s Bar Association.

Florida Senate
Preceded by Wilton Simpson	Majority Leader of the Florida Senate; 2018–2020	Succeeded by Debbie Mayfield
Political offices
Preceded by Wilton Simpson	President of the Florida Senate; 2022–2024	Succeeded by Ben Albritton
