= 1920 Florida gubernatorial election =

- November 2, 1920
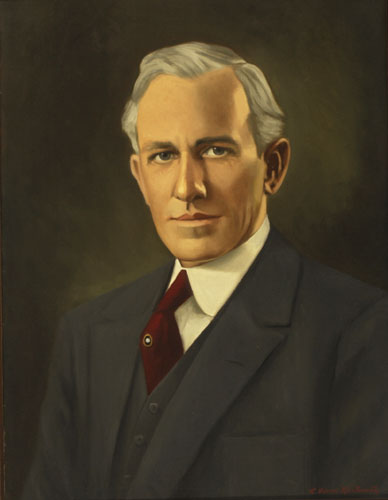

Nominee	Cary A. Hardee	George E. Gay
Party	Democratic	Republican
Popular vote	103,407	23,788
Percentage	77.94%	17.93%

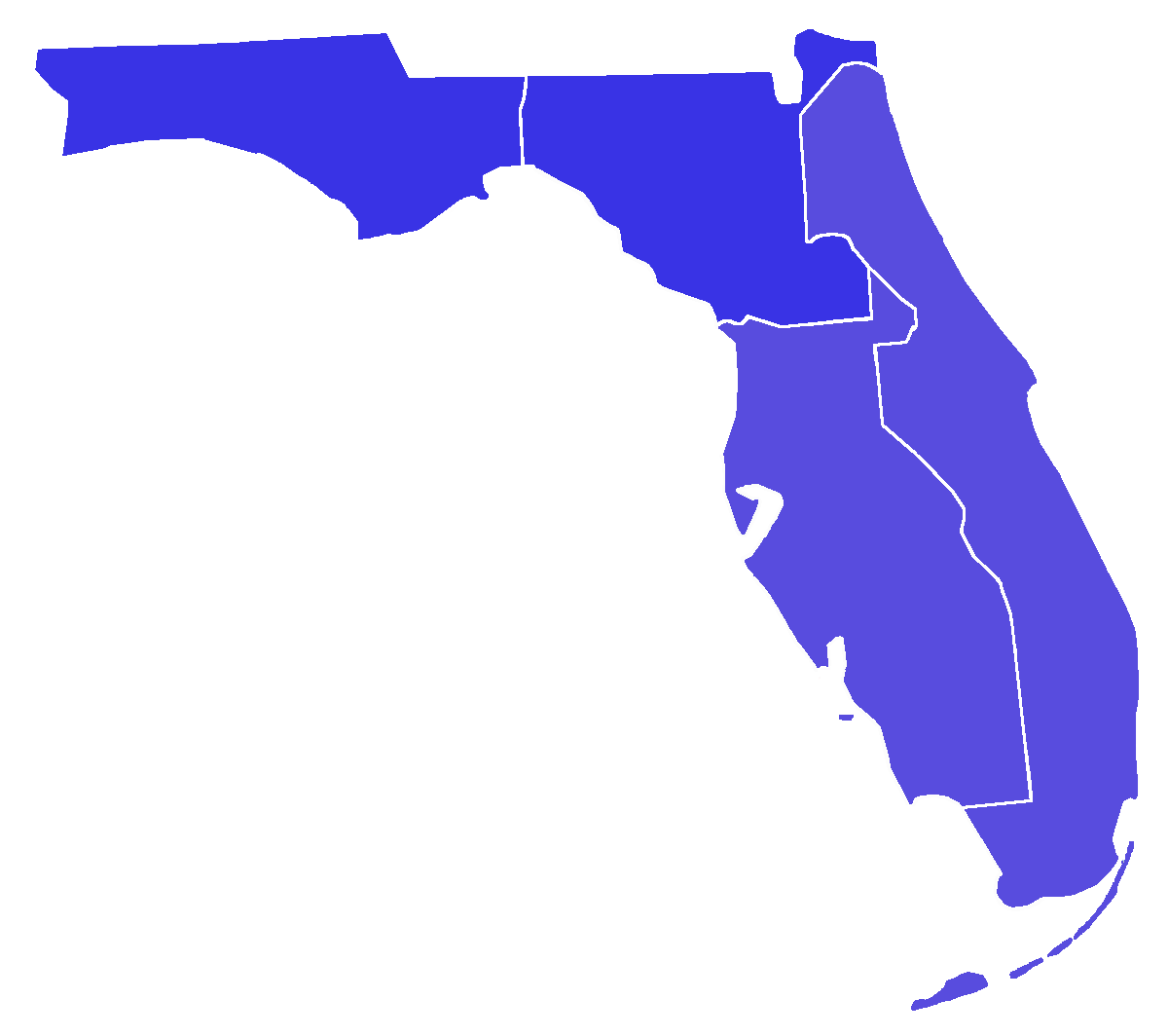
Hardee:
50–60%
60–70%
70–80%
80–90%
>90%
Governor before election
Sidney Johnston Catts
Prohibition
Elected Governor
Cary A. Hardee
Democratic

The 1920 Florida gubernatorial election was held on November 2, 1920. Democratic nominee Cary A. Hardee defeated Republican nominee George E. Gay with 77.94% of the vote.

== Primary elections ==
Primary elections were held on June 8, 1920.

=== Democratic primary ===
==== Candidates ====
- Cary A. Hardee, former Speaker of the Florida House of Representatives
- Van C. Swearingen, Florida Attorney General
- Lincoln Hulley, State senator

==== Results ====
Democratic primary results
Party	Candidate	Votes	%
Democratic	Cary A. Hardee	52,591	59.48
Democratic	Van C. Swearingen	30,240	34.20
Democratic	Lincoln Hulley	5,591	6.32
Total votes		88,422	100.00

== General election ==
=== Candidates ===
Major party candidates

- Cary A. Hardee, Democratic
- George E. Gay, Republican

Other candidates

- Furman C. Whitaker, Socialist, doctor and Socialist Party candidate in 1904 for the Manatee County School District.
- W.L. VanDuzer, Independent

=== Results ===
1920 Florida gubernatorial election
Party	Candidate	Votes	%	±%
Democratic	Cary A. Hardee	103,407	77.94%	
Republican	George E. Gay	23,788	17.93%	
Socialist	Furman C. Whitaker	2,823	2.13%	
Independent	W.L. VanDuzer	2,654	2.00%	
Majority		79,619	60.01	
Turnout		132,672		
Democratic gain from Prohibition		Swing		

==== County Results ====
County	Cary A. Hardee Democratic		George E. Gay Republican		Furman C. Whitaker Socialist		W.L. VanDuzer Independent		Totals
County	#	%	#	%	#	%	#	%	Totals
Alachua	3,362	80.95%	756	18.20%	18	0.43%	17	0.41%	4,153
Baker	405	85.99%	51	10.83%	7	1.49%	8	1.70%	471
Bay	980	78.03%	50	3.98%	43	3.42%	183	14.57%	1,256
Bradford	1,274	86.61%	168	11.42%	6	0.41%	23	1.56%	1,471
Brevard	1,084	72.80%	340	22.83%	28	1.88%	37	2.48%	1,489
Broward	534	60.34%	263	29.72%	57	6.44%	31	3.50%	885
Calhoun	972	89.75%	89	8.22%	8	0.74%	14	1.29%	1,083
Citrus	638	91.01%	35	4.99%	6	0.86%	22	3.14%	701
Clay	626	71.54%	228	26.06%	4	0.46%	17	1.94%	875
Columbia	1,247	88.94%	129	9.20%	7	0.50%	19	1.36%	1,402
Dade	5,525	69.39%	2,190	27.51%	189	2.37%	58	0.73%	7,962
DeSoto	2,715	91.44%	175	5.89%	-	0.00%	79	2.66%	2,969
Duval	15,867	79.54%	3,315	16.62%	186	0.93%	581	2.91%	19,949
Escambia	3,591	80.77%	559	12.57%	194	4.36%	102	2.29%	4,446
Flagler	280	77.13%	27	7.44%	53	14.60%	3	0.83%	363
Franklin	567	73.54%	186	24.12%	11	1.43%	7	0.91%	771
Gadsden	1,890	98.75%	16	0.84%	6	0.31%	2	0.10%	1,914
Hamilton	712	88.23%	76	9.42%	11	1.36%	8	0.99%	807
Hernando	670	87.01%	72	9.35%	17	2.21%	11	1.43%	770
Hillsborough	8,898	79.72%	1,485	13.31%	523	4.69%	255	2.28%	11,161
Holmes	1,188	73.61%	364	22.55%	35	2.17%	27	1.67%	1,614
Jackson	2,510	90.06%	210	7.53%	27	0.97%	40	1.44%	2,787
Jefferson	772	84.19%	135	14.72%	4	0.44%	6	0.65%	917
Lafayette	659	94.82%	30	4.32%	4	0.58%	2	0.29%	695
Lake	1,804	76.86%	475	20.24%	41	1.75%	27	1.15%	2,347
Lee	1,117	72.53%	391	25.39%	21	1.36%	11	0.71%	1,540
Leon	1,453	81.35%	298	16.69%	15	0.84%	20	1.12%	1,786
Levy	927	83.89%	169	15.29%	4	0.36%	5	0.45%	1,105
Liberty	445	95.09%	12	2.56%	5	1.07%	6	1.28%	468
Madison	917	97.66%	14	1.49%	4	0.43%	4	0.43%	939
Manatee	2,024	78.82%	406	15.81%	118	4.60%	20	0.78%	2,568
Marion	2,629	75.31%	790	22.63%	28	0.80%	44	1.26%	3,491
Monroe	1,181	71.66%	316	19.17%	104	6.31%	47	2.85%	1,648
Nassau	944	86.76%	125	11.49%	6	0.55%	13	1.19%	1,088
Okaloosa	698	82.60%	125	14.79%	15	1.78%	7	0.83%	845
Okeechobee	320	89.39%	14	3.91%	8	2.23%	16	4.47%	358
Orange	2,425	72.07%	817	24.28%	52	1.55%	71	2.11%	3,365
Osceola	1,006	57.75%	682	39.15%	25	1.44%	29	1.66%	1,742
Palm Beach	1,999	58.59%	1,289	37.78%	97	2.84%	27	0.79%	3,412
Pasco	1,347	72.89%	302	16.34%	57	3.08%	142	7.68%	1,848
Pinellas	3,442	68.36%	1,436	28.52%	113	2.24%	44	0.87%	5,035
Polk	4,494	80.93%	736	13.25%	166	2.99%	157	2.83%	5,553
Putnam	1,828	66.35%	874	31.72%	37	1.34%	16	0.58%	2,755
Santa Rosa	919	93.11%	53	5.37%	3	0.30%	12	1.22%	987
Seminole	1,597	74.87%	449	21.05%	71	3.33%	16	0.75%	2,133
St. Johns	2,088	75.16%	604	21.74%	46	1.66%	40	1.44%	2,778
St. Lucie	1,343	75.24%	366	20.50%	46	2.58%	30	1.68%	1,785
Sumter	939	85.29%	108	9.81%	46	4.18%	8	0.73%	1,101
Suwannee	1,583	82.02%	235	12.18%	91	4.72%	21	1.09%	1,930
Taylor	627	89.83%	55	7.88%	5	0.72%	11	1.58%	698
Volusia	3,494	71.50%	1,069	21.87%	106	2.17%	218	4.46%	4,887
Wakulla	524	85.06%	85	13.80%	4	0.65%	3	0.49%	616
Walton	1,459	78.10%	364	19.49%	23	1.23%	22	1.18%	1,868
Washington	868	76.75%	180	15.92%	68	6.01%	15	1.33%	1,131
Actual Total	103,407	77.91%	23,788	17.92%	2,869	2.16%	2,654	2.00%	132,718
Official Total	103,407	77.94%	23,788	17.93%	2,823	2.13%	2,654	2.00%	132,672

Counties that flipped from Prohibition to Democratic

- Baker
- Bay
- Bradford
- Broward
- Calhoun
- Citrus
- Clay
- Columbia
- Dade
- DeSoto
- Franklin
- Hamilton
- Hernando
- Hillsborough
- Holmes
- Jackson
- Lafayette
- Lake
- Lee
- Levy
- Liberty
- Madison
- Manatee
- Okaloosa
- Osceola
- Pasco
- Pinellas
- Polk
- Seminole
- St. Lucie
- Suwannee
- Taylor
- Volusia
- Wakulla
- Washington
- Walton

Counties that flipped from Republican to Democratic

- Monroe
