= Tom Grady =

American politician

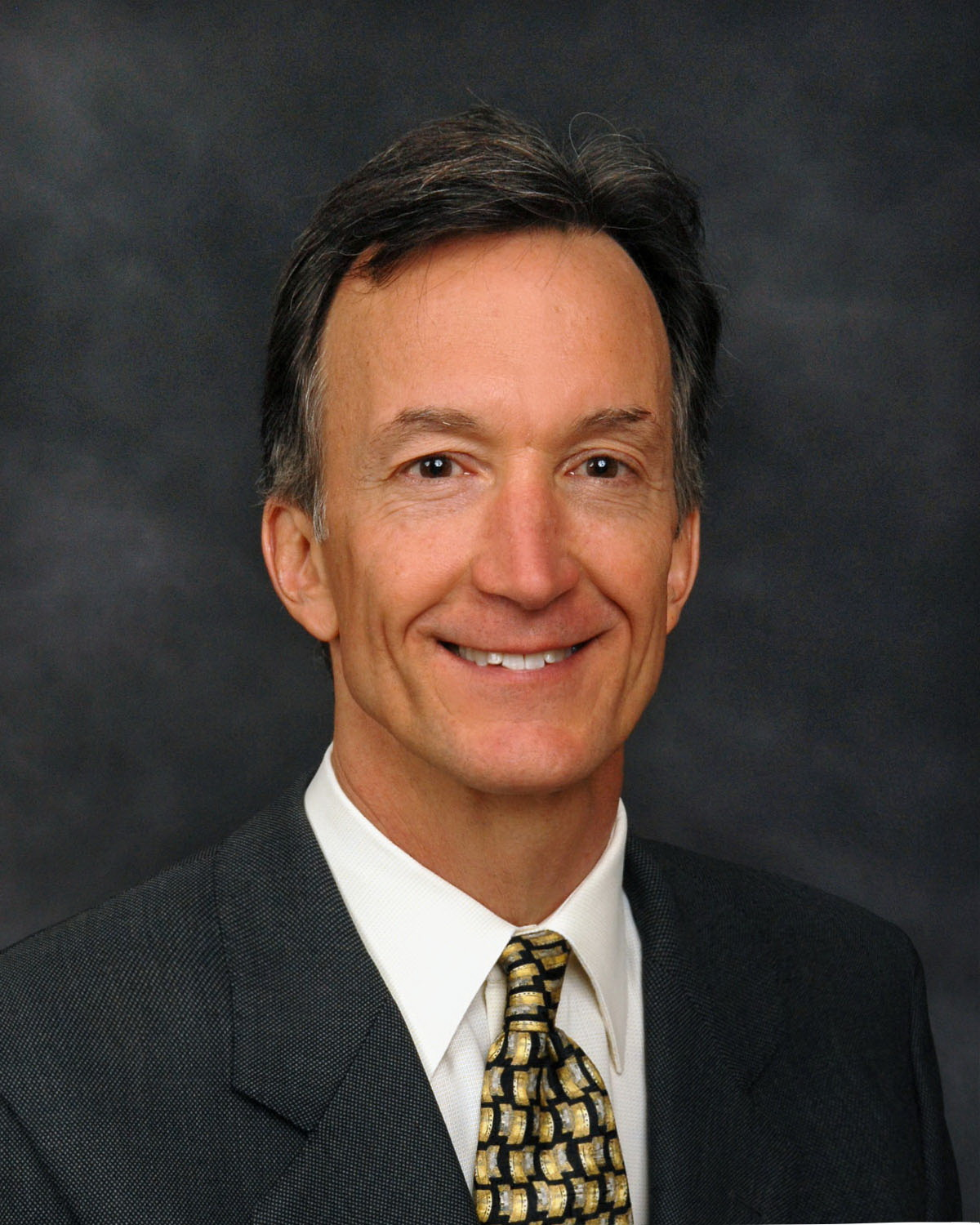

Member of the Florida House of Representatives from the 76th district
- In office 2008–2010
- Preceded by: Garrett Richter
- Succeeded by: Kathleen Passidomo

Personal details
- Born: May 14, 1958 (age 68) Fairview Park, Ohio
- Party: Republican
- Spouse: Ann Grady
- Education: Florida State University (BS); Duke University (JD)
- Profession: Attorney

Tom Grady (born May 14, 1958) is an American politician. Grady served as a member in the Florida House of Representatives of the U.S. state of Florida. He attended Florida State University and graduated with a finance degree in 1979. He then went on to Law School at Duke University and graduated with his Juris Doctor in 1982. Grady lives in Naples, Florida with his family.
