= Wilton Simpson =

American politician (born 1966)

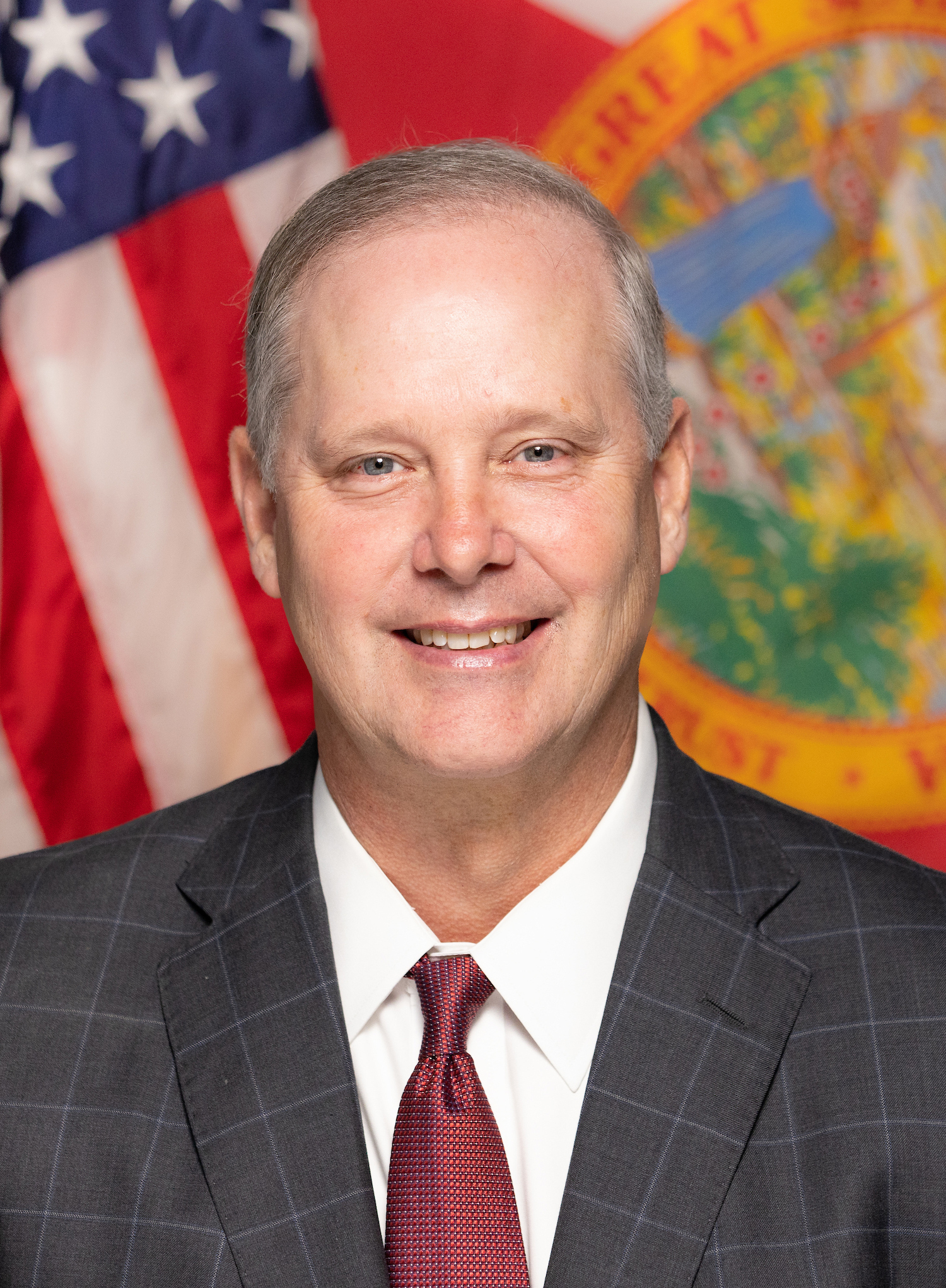
- Official portrait, 2023

13th Florida Commissioner of Agriculture
- Incumbent
- Assumed office January 3, 2023
- Governor: Ron DeSantis; Byron Donalds (elect)
- Preceded by: Nikki Fried

President of the Florida Senate
- In office November 17, 2020 – November 22, 2022
- Preceded by: Bill Galvano
- Succeeded by: Kathleen Passidomo

Majority Leader of the Florida Senate
- In office November 29, 2016 – November 26, 2018
- Preceded by: Bill Galvano
- Succeeded by: Kathleen Passidomo

Member of the Florida Senate
- In office November 6, 2012 – November 8, 2022
- Preceded by: Redistricted
- Succeeded by: Jason Brodeur (redistricted)
- Constituency: 18th district (2012–2016); 10th district (2016–2022)

Personal details
- Born: Wilton Earl Simpson; June 28, 1966 (age 60) Lakeland, Florida, U.S.
- Party: Republican
- Spouse: Kathy Shotts
- Children: 2
- Education: Pasco-Hernando State College (AA)

Wilton Earl Simpson (born June 28, 1966) is an American politician who has served as the 13th agriculture commissioner of Florida since 2023. A member of the Republican Party, he served as a member of the Florida Senate from 2012 to 2022 and was the Senate president from the 2020 to 2022.

In 2025, he became embroiled in a public feud with Governor Ron DeSantis over the issue of illegal immigration.

== Early life and education ==
Simpson was born in Lakeland, Florida, in 1966. He earned an Associate of Arts degree from Pasco–Hernando State College (formerly Pasco–Hernando Community College) in 1997. Simpson has worked for his family's businesses, Simpson Environmental Services and Simpson Farms. For over four decades, he owned and managed a large-scale egg-laying operation that supplied grocery stores throughout the state.

== Political career ==
=== Florida Senate ===
Following the reconfiguration of Florida Senate districts in 2012, Simpson ran in the newly created 18th District, and although he initially anticipated engaging State Representative John Legg in a "very difficult primary," he ended up winning the nomination of the Republican Party and was unopposed in the general election when Legg decided to run in an adjacent district and his only Democratic opponent, a college student, dropped out.

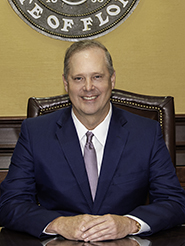
Simpson's official portrait as Senate President

Florida Senate President Don Gaetz gave control over the reform of the Florida Retirement System to Simpson, announcing that he would either accept the plan proposed by the Florida House of Representatives that would close the FRS pension system to all new employees who become eligible after January 1, 2014 or a plan that would extend the date to after July 1, 2014. However, on April 30, 2013, the Florida Senate rejected a plan similar to the House proposal, and as the 2013 session closed out, Simpson conceded that there would be no reforms for the rest of the year.

Simpson had more success, however, with legislation dealing with the restoration of the Everglades, whereby taxes on farmers in the region would be maintained until the 2030s, $880 million would be allocated for water quality restoration, and $32 million would be spent annually on reducing the amount of phosphorus that flows into the region, which was unanimously approved by the legislature.

Simpson's district was reconfigured and renumbered after court-ordered redistricting in 2016. In 2022, Simpson supported a measure which would allow "regulators to impose fees and barriers to rooftop solar installation." According to the bill sponsor, the proposal would have protected non-solar customers from shouldering the costs of maintaining the electrical grid that rooftop solar customers also use.

He championed several agriculture-focused policies in the Florida Senate, including increased legal protections for agricultural operations through the Right to Farm Act, reducing the tax burden on farmers by strengthening Florida's greenbelt laws, and expanding Agritourism throughout Florida.

On November 17, 2020, Simpson was elected Senate president for the 2020–2022 legislature. During his tenure, Simpson prioritized making improvements to the child welfare and foster care system and the legislature boosted funding for environmental and land conservation programs, provided bonuses and pay increases to first responders, funded improvements to Florida's roadways and seaports, and supported Florida's communities and businesses during the COVID-19 pandemic.

Simpson played a leading role throughout the COVID-19 pandemic in Florida. This included his appointment to Governor DeSantis' Re-Open Florida Task Force and ensuring there were little to no budget disruptions during the economic downturn. Privately, Simpson donated approximately 41,666 dozen eggs to various nonprofit groups to aid struggling families impacted by the COVID-19 pandemic.

The state redistricting process for congressional and state legislative districts occurred during his leadership term and it went without opposition, prompting the Florida Supreme Court to note in their opinion that "for the first time since the voters adopted the existing procedural framework for judicial review of apportionment in 1968, no one appeared to oppose the Legislature's plans."

In 2021, Simpson championed the successful passage of the Florida Wildlife Corridor Act, which added 8 million acres of protected lands for wildlife to the 10 million acres already under State protection. The act also directed the state of Florida to better protect and connect Florida's natural areas and habitats wildlife habitats and to preserve working agricultural lands from future development. To provide Florida's parents more educational choices, Simpson oversaw the successful passage in 2022 of House Bill 7045, which created a historic expansion of school choice that increased eligibility and streamlined key school choice scholarship programs for students with unique abilities and students from lower income families. Simpson was also a driving force behind Florida's child welfare reforms in 2022. These reforms included improvements to Florida's foster care system and increased accountability for state institutions.

=== Florida Agriculture Commissioner ===
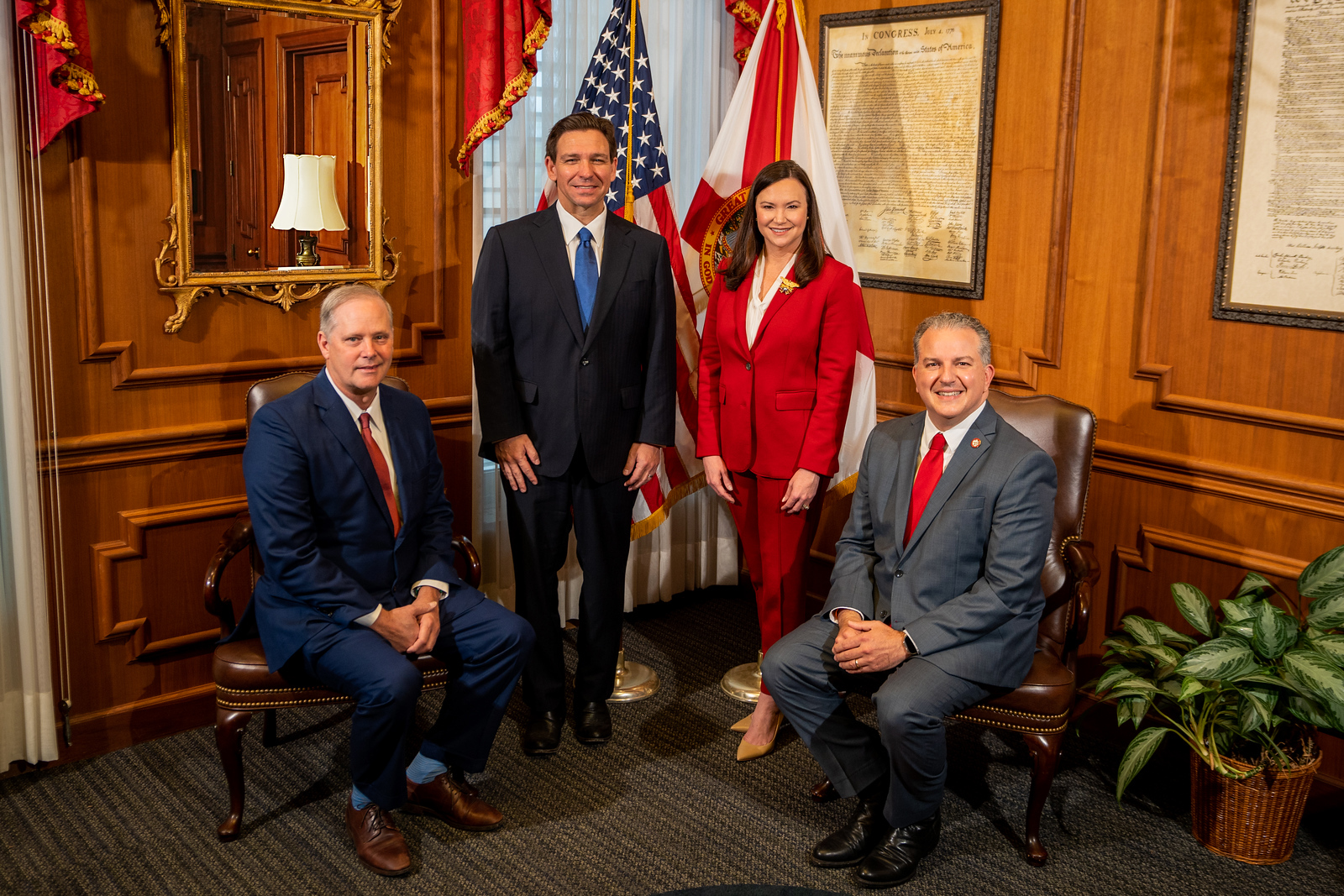
Florida Cabinet in 2023

In September 2021, Simpson announced he was running for Florida Agriculture Commissioner in the 2022 election cycle. In the Republican Primary election, Simpson was challenged by James Shaw. Simpson won against Shaw with 64.7% of the vote. Simpson was endorsed by Governor Ron DeSantis, noting that Simpson had helped pass major reform for election integrity, choice in education, big tech censorship, and law enforcement recruitment.” Other endorsements for Simpson included President Donald Trump, 59 Florida Sheriffs, The NRA, Florida Farm Bureau FarmPAC, The Florida Police Benevolent Association, Florida Forestry Association, Florida Chamber of Commerce, The Associated Industries of Florida, Colonel Mike Waltz, Attorney General Ashley Moody, and CFO Jimmy Patronis.

Running against Democrat Naomi Blemur in the 2022 general election, Simpson won the office with 59.3% of the vote. Simpson took office on January 3, 2023, as Florida Commissioner of Agriculture. With Simpson’s support, that month the Florida legislature passed Senate Bill 214, the Florida Firearms and Ammo Act that created increased limitations on how financial institutions tracked firearm purchases in Florida. Simpson has prioritized the preservation of agricultural lands through the Rural and Family Lands Protection Program, an agricultural land preservation program designed to protect important agricultural lands through the acquisition of permanent agricultural land conservation easements. In May of 2023, Governor DeSantis and his cabinet (including Simpson) approved the preservation of 18,279.38 acres as part of this program thereby protecting state food production capabilities.

In February 2025 with Simpson's backing, Senator Keith Truenow filed a bill to ban the addition of fluoride to drinking water in Florida. Florida's Chapter of the American Academy of Pediatrics has warned, "Insufficient fluoride exposure can have significant negative effects on oral health," and advises the "most common chronic disease in childhood...," disproportionately affects "children of lower socioeconomic status who are less likely to have access to dental care."

Readiness standards for charging stations for EV vehicles is established by the department of agricultural and consumer services that is under his leadership. Simpson originally supported expansion of availability and even supported a percentage readiness ratio requirement. The new standards established by the agency opted against proposed pre-wiring for readiness requirements for all developers in the new statewide rules, however, and the agency declined to reply regarding the omission.

==== Feud with DeSantis ====
In January 2025, the Florida Legislature proposed an act granting the agriculture commissioner control over illegal immigration enforcement in Florida. Governor Ron DeSantis condemned the proposed bill, blaming "the agriculture industry's affinity for cheap, illegal foreign labor" and criticized Simpson for supporting a 2014 bill offering in-state tuition to children brought to the country illegally. The events were widely described as a feud.

=== Community Involvement ===
Simpson has become notable in Hernando and Pasco Counties for his philanthropic work in the area. In 2012, the Simpson Breast Health Center opened in Zephyrhills, Florida. The center provides numerous services for women and breast cancer patients.

In June of 2022, the Hernando County School Board approved the construction of the Wilton Simpson Technical College, to be located at the Dennis Wilfong Center for Success. School Superintendent, John Stratton, said of the project: “Mr. Simpson has been a driving force for the technical center. We appreciate his unwavering support for Hernando County schools.”

Another cancer treatment center, The Moffitt Cancer Center, honored Simpson in 2023 by dedicating a new wing to the Florida politician at their new campus. The “W. E. Simpson Concourse for Cures” will be able to provide advanced treatment to the surrounding community.

Florida Senate
Preceded by Bill Galvano	Majority Leader of the Florida Senate; 2016–2018	Succeeded by Kathleen Passidomo
Political offices
Preceded by Bill Galvano	President of the Florida Senate; 2020–2022	Succeeded by Kathleen Passidomo
Preceded by Nikki Fried	Agriculture Commissioner of Florida; 2023–present	Incumbent
Party political offices
Preceded by Matt Caldwell	Republican nominee for Agriculture Commissioner of Florida; 2022, 2026	Most recent
