= Roberts Ranch =

- U.S. National Register of Historic Places
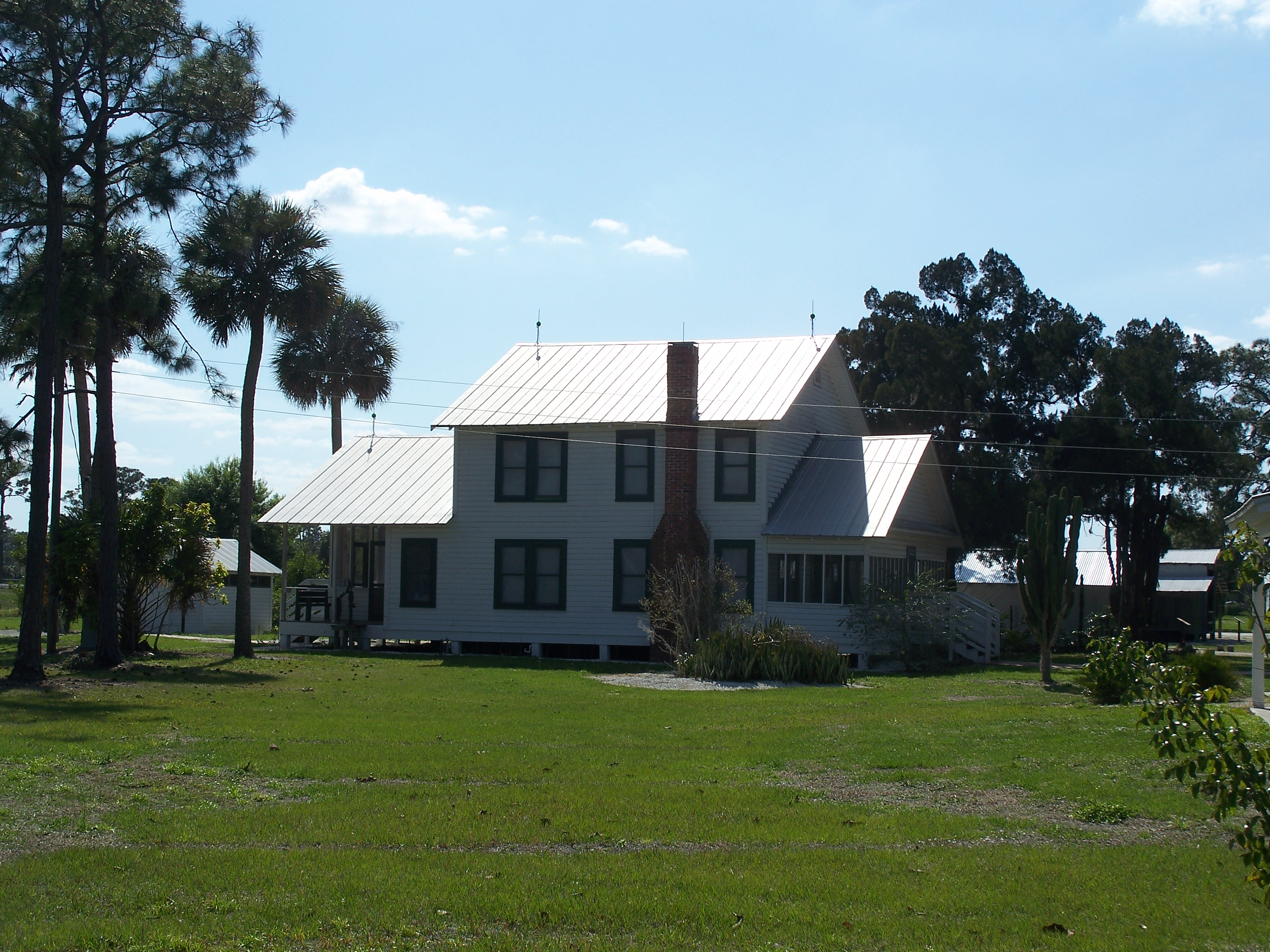

- Location within Florida Location within the United States
- Location: Immokalee, Florida
- Coordinates: 26°25′15″N 81°25′54″W
- NRHP reference No.: 03000990
- Added to NRHP: October 4, 2003

The Roberts Ranch (also known as the Old Allen Place or Baucom Place) is a historic site in Immokalee, Florida. It is located at 1215 Roberts Avenue. On October 4, 2003, it was added to the U.S. National Register of Historic Places.

== Immokalee Pioneer Museum ==
The Immokalee Pioneer Museum, located at Roberts Ranch, is a 15-acre (61,000 m^{2}) open-air museum that includes 19 preserved buildings of the original ranch. The Ranch is operated as one of the 5 Collier County Museums. Displays focus on late 19th century ranch life at the edge of the Big Cypress Swamp.

The museum had a replica of Francis A. Hendry's Confederate officer uniform created, which is sometimes worn for visitors.
