= Christ Church (Episcopal), Fort Meade, Florida =

Historic church in Florida, United States

- Christ Church
- U.S. National Register of Historic Places
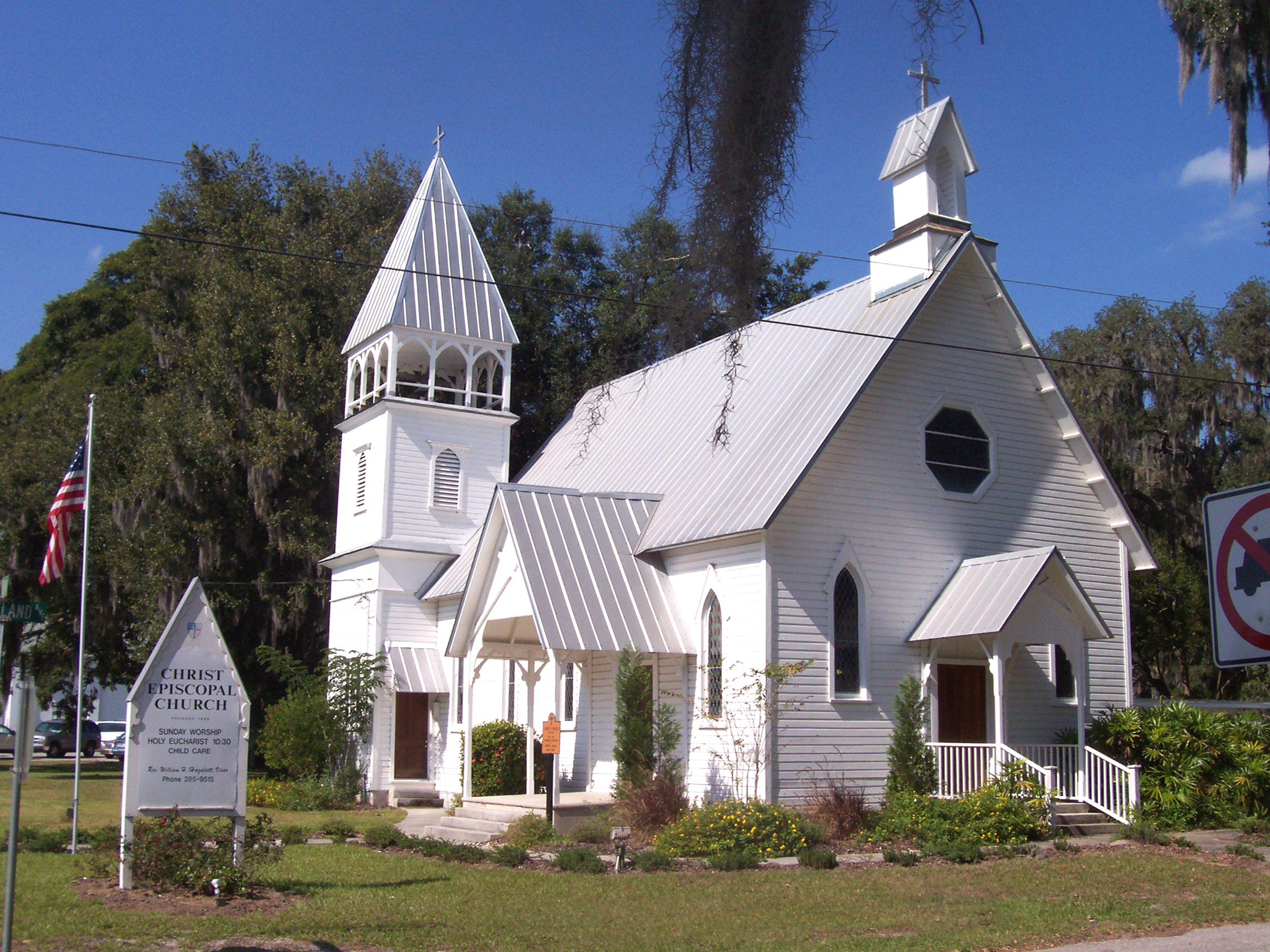
- Christ Church (Fort Meade, Florida)

- Location within Florida Location within the United States
- Location: Fort Meade, Florida
- Coordinates: 27°45′8″N 81°47′46″W
- Built: 1889
- Architect: J. H. Weddell
- Architectural style: Carpenter Gothic
- NRHP reference No.: 76000605
- Added to NRHP: 6 May 1976

Christ Church (Episcopal) is an historic Carpenter Gothic church in Fort Meade, Florida. It is located at 1 N. Cleveland Avenue. On May 6, 1976, it was added to the U.S. National Register of Historic Places.
