= George W. Hendry =

American Florida early settler (1838–1914)

George Washington Hendry
- Born: December 3, 1838; Thomas County, Georgia, U.S.
- Died: March 2, 1914 (aged 75); Fort Meade, Florida, U.S.
- Other names: G.W. Hendry, Wash Hendry
- Occupation(s): Land developer, writer, farmer, military personnel
- Known for: Early settler in southwest Florida, namesake of the Wash Hendry Branch of the Peace River
- Relatives: Francis Asbury "Berry" Hendry (brother)

George Washington "Wash" Hendry (1838–1914), was an American land developer, writer, and farmer, who was from an early settler family in Southwest Florida. Hendry served in the Seminole Wars, and in the American Civil War for the Confederate States Army. He was also known as G.W. Hendry, and Wash Hendry.

== Biography ==
George Washington Hendry was born on December 3, 1838, in Thomas County, Georgia. The family was of English and Scotch ancestry. He arrived in the Fort Meade area at age fourteen in 1853. The Hendrys were a prominent family in Southwest Florida. His older brother was Captain Francis Asbury "Berry" Hendry, one of the founders of the city of Fort Myers and the namesake of Hendry County, Florida.

Hendry had dealt in land development in Florida. He farmed citrus fruit but lost his crops during a freeze. Hendry is credited with building the first residence in the area, a log cabin used by cattle herders and for hunting and fishing by him and his friends. In 1883, he authored a book on the history of Polk County, Florida. Hendry was married three times.

Hendry served in the Seminole Wars from 1855 to 1856. He also served in the American Civil War (1861–1865) for the Confederate States Army, and he held the title of Captain.

== Death and legacy ==
Hendry died on March 2, 1914, at the Southern Hotel in Fort Meade, Florida after six weeks of an illness. He was buried at the Evergreen Cemetery in Fort Meade.

The Wash Hendry Branch of the Peace River was named for the area that once housed his former cabin and land; and the nearby Berry Hendry Branch of the Peace River was named for his older brothers former cabin and land.

== Writings ==
- Hendry, George Washington (1883). Polk County, Florida, its Lands and Products. Jacksonville, Fla.: Ashmead Bros. OCLC 25604428.
