= Jack Murphy (Florida politician) =

American politician

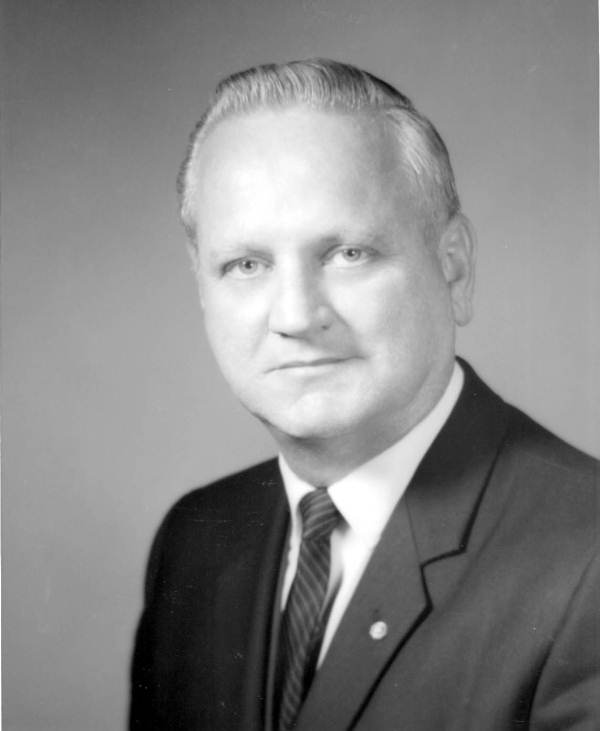

Member of the Florida House of Representatives from the 49th district
- In office 1966–1972
- Succeeded by: Ray Mattox

Personal details
- Born: June 18, 1926 Erie, Pennsylvania, U.S.
- Died: December 13, 1989 (aged 63) Pinellas County, Florida, U.S.
- Party: Republican
- Education: Florida State University
- Occupation: reporter, news editor

John P. Murphy (June 18, 1926 – December 13, 1989) was a politician in the American state of Florida. He served in the Florida House of Representatives from 1966 to 1972, representing the 49th district.
