= William Bevis =

American politician

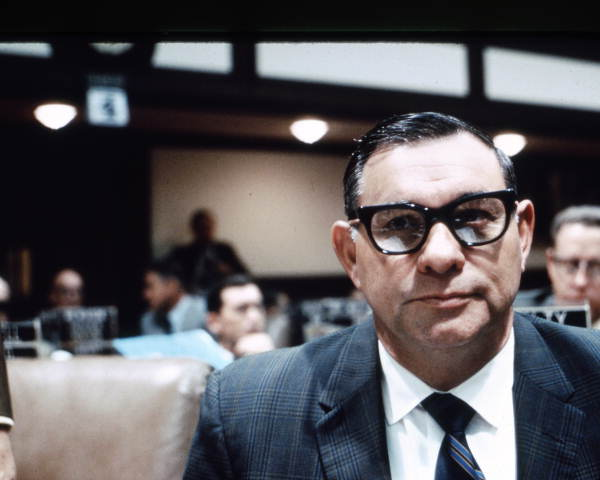
- Bevis in 1970

Member of the Florida House of Representatives from the 57th district
- In office 1967–1970
- Preceded by: District established
- Succeeded by: Ray Mattox

Personal details
- Born: March 20, 1920 Two Egg, Florida, U.S.
- Died: December 31, 2010 (aged 90)
- Party: Democratic
- Education: University of Tennessee

William H. Bevis (March 20, 1920 – December 31, 2010) was an American politician. He served as a Democratic member for the 57th district of the Florida House of Representatives.

== Life and career ==
Bevis was born in Two Egg, Florida. He attended the University of Tennessee, earning a degree in accounting.

Bevis served in the United States Army Air Forces in World War II.

In 1967, Bevis was elected as the first representative for the newly established 57th district of the Florida House of Representatives. He served until 1970, opting to run for the position of commissioner for the Florida Public Service Commission. His seat was succeeded by Ray Mattox. Bevis was elected as a commissioner in 1970, holding the position until 1978, when he resigned.

Bevis died on December 31, 2010, at the age of 90.
