= Ray Mattox =

American politician

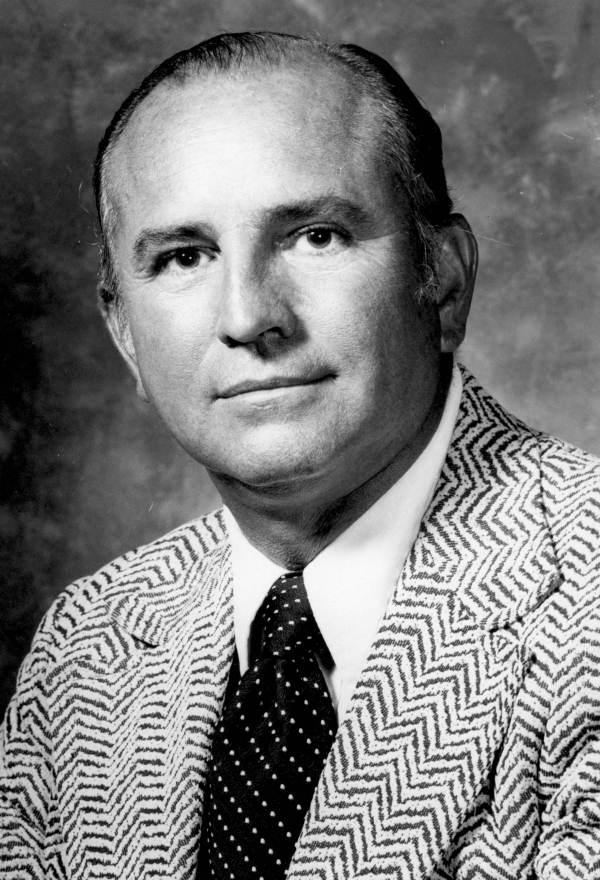
- Mattox in 1974

Member of the Florida House of Representatives from Polk County
- In office 1957–1967

Member of the Florida House of Representatives from the 56th district
- In office 1967–1968
- Preceded by: District established
- Succeeded by: Bob Brannen

Member of the Florida House of Representatives from the 57th district
- In office 1970–1972
- Preceded by: William Bevis
- Succeeded by: John J. Savage

Member of the Florida House of Representatives from the 49th district
- In office 1972–1976
- Preceded by: Jack Murphy
- Succeeded by: Bob Crawford

Personal details
- Born: Walter Raymond Mattox; March 10, 1927 Jesup, Georgia, U.S.
- Died: December 29, 2005 (aged 78) Winter Haven, Florida, U.S.
- Party: Democratic
- Children: 2
- Education: Florida Southern College; University of Florida

Walter Raymond Mattox (March 10, 1927 – December 29, 2005) was an American politician. A member of the Democratic Party, he served in the Florida House of Representatives from 1957 to 1968 and again from 1972 to 1976.

== Life and career ==
Mattox was born in Jesup, Georgia, the son of Grady Mattox and Audry James. He served in the United States Navy during World War II, which after his discharge, he attended Florida Southern College, earning his BS degree in business economics in 1951. He also attended the University of Florida, earning his law degree in 1954. He was a second lieutenant in the United States Army Reserve during the Korean War.

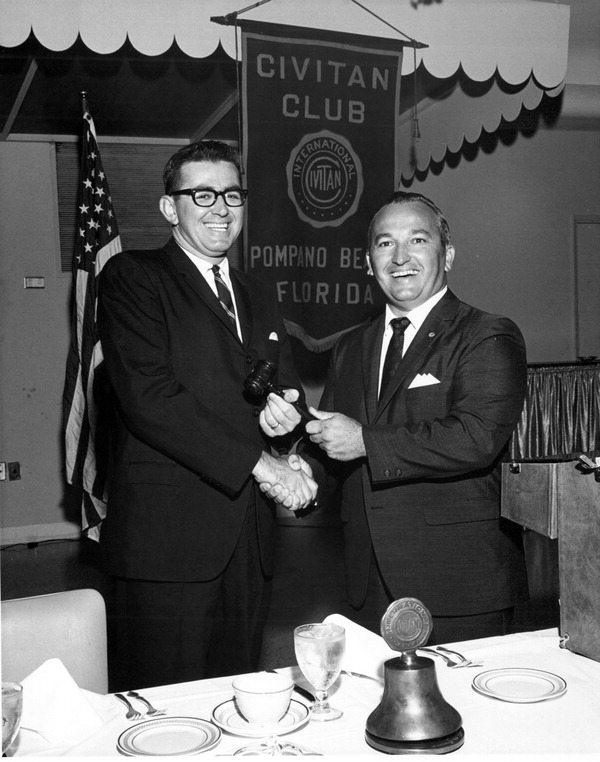
Mattox (right) with an unidentified man at the Civitan International, 1969

Mattox served in the Florida House of Representatives from 1957 to 1968 and again from 1972 to 1976. He lost his seat in the House, in 1976, when he ran as a Democratic candidate for United States representative from the Florida's 8th district. He received 14,876 votes, but lost in the Democratic primary election to candidate Andy Ireland, who won with 36,048 votes.

== Death ==
Mattox died on December 29, 2005, of a heart attack in Winter Haven, Florida, at the age of 78.
