= Lincoln Hulley =

20th-century Florida state senator

Lincoln Hulley (May 3, 1865 – January 20, 1934) was a history professor, president of Stetson University, and Florida State Senator.

== Early life and education ==
Hulley was born to a Methodist family on May 3, 1865. He graduated from Bucknell University in 1888 and then became a post-graduate student at Harvard. In 1895 he earned his Ph.D. degree from the University of Chicago.

== Career ==
After getting his Ph.D. degree, Hully then returned to Bucknell to teach history. Then in 1904 at 39 years of age Hully moved to DeLand, Florida and became the president of Stetson University. As president of Stetson University he wrote many plays, grew the student body to 500, obtained accreditation, and oversaw the construction of many new buildings. He is also the longest ever sitting president of Stetson University serving for 30 years ending with his death in 1934. Hully also was elected to the Florida Senate twice during his tenure as the president of Stetson University representing Florida's 28th Senate District from 1918-1921. During his Senate tenure Dr. Hulley was an advocate for women's suffrage passing laws in 1918 that gave women the right to vote in municipal elections in Deland, Daytona, and Daytona Beach.

== Gubernatorial campaign ==
In 1919, he declared plans to run in the 1920 Florida gubernatorial election. In an article called "Hulley is Hustling" about Hulley's seriousness as a candidate, the Tampa Times noted that he drove a Ford vehicle around the state while campaigning for office. During his campaign Hulley stopped at a St. Lucie high school where he told a handful of humorous fables, and got the students to chant his name. However, this strategy didn't bode well with the public with the Ocala Star and the Punta Gorda Herald criticizing him for abusing his authority as a professor to lecture students on politics.

=== Results ===
Democratic primary results
Party	Candidate	Votes	%
Democratic	Cary A. Hardee	52,591	59.48
Democratic	Van C. Swearingen	30,240	34.20
Democratic	Lincoln Hulley	5,591	6.32
Total votes		88,422	100.00
