= 2022 Florida Commissioner of Agriculture election =

- November 8, 2022
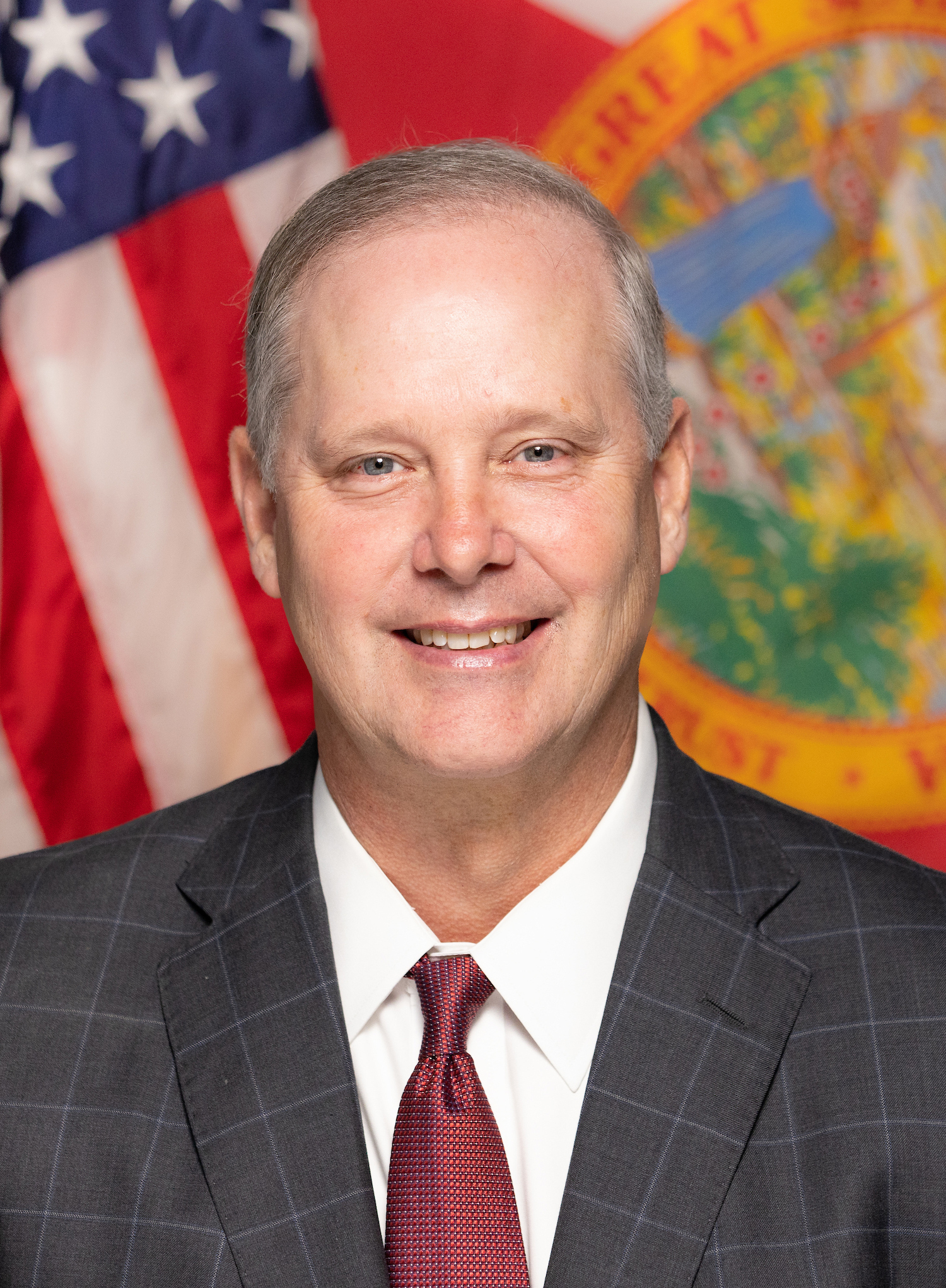

Nominee	Wilton Simpson	Naomi Blemur
Party	Republican	Democratic
Popular vote	4,510,644	3,095,786
Percentage	59.30%	40.70%
- Simpson: 50–60% 60–70% 70–80% 80–90% >90% Blemur: 50–60% 60–70% 70–80% 80–90% >90% Tie: 50% No votes
Agriculture
Commissioner before election
Nikki Fried
Democratic
Elected Agriculture
Commissioner
Wilton Simpson
Republican

The 2022 Florida Commissioner of Agriculture election was held on November 8, 2022, to elect the Florida Commissioner of Agriculture. Incumbent Democratic Commissioner of Agriculture Nikki Fried was eligible to run for a second term, but she instead ran for governor of Florida in 2022. Republican Wilton Simpson won the election with over 59% of the vote. Simpson's victory gave Republicans complete control of statewide offices and government for the first time since Reconstruction.

== Democratic primary ==
=== Candidates ===
==== Declared ====
- Naomi Esther Blemur, accountant
- J.R. Gaillot, policy consultant, candidate for Florida's 3rd congressional district in 2012 and state representative in 2016
- Ryan Morales, marketing consultant

Results by county: Blemur: 30–40%; 40–50%; 50–60%; Morales: 30–40%; 40–50%

==== Withdrawn ====
- Adam Christensen, nominee for Florida's 3rd congressional district in 2020

==== Declined ====
- Gary Farmer, state senator and former Florida Senate minority leader
- Nikki Fried, incumbent commissioner of agriculture (ran for governor)
- Melissa McKinlay, Palm Beach County commissioner and former mayor of Palm Beach County

=== Endorsements ===
Naomi Esther Blemur

State legislators

- ~~Shevrin Jones, state senator~~
- ~~Annette Taddeo, state senator~~

Local officials

- ~~Daniella Levine Cava, mayor of Miami-Dade County~~

Newspapers

- Tampa Bay Times
J.R. Gaillot

County officials

- Nan Rich, Broward County commissioner
Ryan Morales

State legislators

- Jason Pizzo, state senator
- Vic Torres, state senator

Newspapers

- Miami Herald
Declined to endorse

Newspapers

- Sun-Sentinel

=== Results ===
Democratic primary results
Party	Candidate	Votes	%
Democratic	Naomi Esther Blemur	699,275	50.35%
Democratic	Ryan Morales	420,609	30.29%
Democratic	J.R. Gaillot	268,863	19.36%
Total votes		1,338,747	100.0%

== Republican primary ==
=== Candidates ===
==== Declared ====
- James Shaw, businessman
- Wilton Simpson, president of the Florida Senate

Results by county: Simpson: 50–60%; 60–70%; 70–80%

==== Did not qualify ====
- Bob White

==== Withdrawn ====
- Chuck Nadd, Afghanistan veteran
- Richard Olle, agriculture inspector

==== Declined ====
- Matt Caldwell, Lee County property appraiser, former state representative, and nominee for commissioner of agriculture in 2018
- Matt Gaetz, U.S. representative for Florida's 1st congressional district (running for reelection)
- Tom Rooney, former U.S. representative for Florida's 17th congressional district

=== Endorsements ===
Wilton Simpson

Former U.S. Executive Branch officials

- Donald Trump, 45th president of the United States (2017–2021)

U.S. representatives

- John Rutherford, U.S. representative for Florida's 4th congressional district
- Mike Waltz, U.S. representative for Florida's 6th congressional district

Statewide officials

- Pam Bondi, former Florida Attorney General
- Richard Corcoran, former Education Commissioner of Florida
- Ron DeSantis, Governor of Florida
- Ashley Moody, Florida Attorney General
- Jimmy Patronis, Chief Financial Officer of Florida
- Chris Sprowls, Speaker of the Florida House of Representatives

Sheriffs

- 59 sheriffs

Individuals

- Grover Norquist, president of Americans for Tax Reform

Organizations

- Associated Builders and Contractors
- Associated Industries of Florida
- Florida Chamber of Commerce
- Florida Farm Bureau FarmPAC
- Florida Forestry Association
- Florida Fraternal Order of Police State Lodge
- Florida Police Benevolent Association
- Florida Professional Firefighters
- National Federation of Independent Business
- NRA Political Victory Fund

Newspapers

- Tampa Bay Times
Declined to endorse

Newspapers

- Miami Herald
- Sun-Sentinel

=== Results ===
Republican primary results
Party	Candidate	Votes	%
Republican	Wilton Simpson	1,048,774	64.71%
Republican	James Shaw	571,957	35.29%
Total votes		1,620,731	100.0%

== General election ==
=== Post-primary endorsements ===
Wilton Simpson

Local officials

- James Walters, Dade City chief of police

=== Polling ===
Poll source	Date(s) administered	Sample size (Note: Key: A – all adults RV – registered voters LV – likely voters V – unclear)	Margin of error	Naomi Esther Blemur (D)	Wilton Simpson (R)	Other	Undecided
University of North Florida	October 17–24, 2022	622 (LV)	± 4.7%	39%	44%	1% (Note: "Refused" with 1%; "Someone else" with <1%)	17%
Mason-Dixon Polling & Strategy	September 26–28, 2022	800 (LV)	± 3.5%	34%	47%	–	19%

=== Results ===
State Senate district results

State House district results

2022 Florida Commissioner of Agriculture election
Party	Candidate	Votes	%	±%
Republican	Wilton Simpson	4,510,644	59.30%	+9.34%
Democratic	Naomi Esther Blemur	3,095,786	40.70%	−9.34%
Total votes		7,606,430	100.0%	
Republican gain from Democratic				

==== By county ====
2022 Florida Agricultural Commissioner election (by county)
County	Wilton Simpson Republican		Naomi Esther Blemur Democratic	
County	#	%	#	%
Alachua	39,810	42.53%	53,785	57.47%
Baker	9,328	88.92%	1,162	11.08%
Bay	51,333	77.61%	14,810	22.39%
Bradford	8,089	81.09%	1,886	18.91%
Brevard	167,640	64.00%	94,301	36.00%
Broward	238,801	40.88%	345,307	59.12%
Calhoun	4,044	84.51%	741	15.49%
Charlotte	63,610	70.09%	27,142	29.91%
Citrus	56,660	76.06%	17.835	23.94%
Clay	66,563	74.84%	22,383	25.16%
Collier	114,378	71.59%	45,380	28.41%
Columbia	18,399	78.72%	4,974	21.28%
DeSoto	6,429	75.33%	2,105	24.67%
Dixie	5,270	86.62%	814	13.38%
Duval	177,499	54.93%	145,624	45.07%
Escambia	73,499	64.50%	40,454	35.50%
Flagler	38,247	66.52%	19,249	33.48%
Franklin	3,098	72.91%	1,452	27.09%
Gadsden	6,478	37.77%	10,672	62.23%
Gilchrist	6,736	86.78%	1,026	13.22%
Glades	3,023	80.33%	740	19.67%
Gulf	5,018	78.99%	1,335	21.01%
Hamilton	3,079	72.76%	1,153	27.24%
Hardee	4,422	82.44%	942	17.56%
Hendry	5,988	73.88%	2,117	26.12%
Hernando	55,997	71.02%	22,855	28.98%
Highlands	29,116	74.43%	10,002	25.57%
Hillsborough	260,234	54.93%	213,504	45.07%
Holmes	6,136	91.32%	583	8.68%
Indian River	51,035	67.92%	24,109	32.08%
Jackson	12,192	75.38%	3,983	24.62%
Jefferson	4,287	61.06%	2,734	38.94%
Lafayette	2,584	89.63%	299	10.37%
Lake	104,894	66.79%	52,147	33.21%
Lee	181,963	68.04%	85,482	31.96%
Leon	49,379	42.92%	65,677	57.08%
Levy	13,864	78.12%	3,882	21.88%
Liberty	2,168	84.06%	411	15.94%
Madison	4,640	67.02%	2,283	32.98%
Manatee	109,873	65.16%	58,736	34.84%
Marion	105,861	69.20%	47,126	30.80%
Martin	52,322	69.12%	23,379	30.88%
Miami-Dade	376,524	54.17%	318,561	45.83%
Monroe	19,946	60.05%	13,267	39.95%
Nassau	36,084	77.01%	10,773	22.99%
Okaloosa	60,613	76.13%	19,007	23.87%
Okeechobee	8,588	80.45%	2,087	19.55%
Orange	181,911	45.64%	216,682	54.36%
Osceola	52,117	51.57%	48,938	48.43%
Palm Beach	269,778	50.65%	262,871	49.35%
Pasco	147,319	66.69%	73,573	33.31%
Pinellas	234,907	56.67%	179,627	43.33%
Polk	145,892	64.74%	79,457	35.26%
Putnam	19,845	75.72%	6,365	24.28%
St. Johns	98,247	69.58%	42,943	30.42%
St. Lucie	69,947	58.54%	49,540	41.46%
Santa Rosa	59,108	79.51%	15,231	20.49%
Sarasota	130,239	60.94%	83,493	39.06%
Seminole	99,283	55.62%	79,234	44.38%
Sumter	64,379	73.63%	23,052	26.37%
Suwannee	13,460	83.01%	2,754	16.99%
Taylor	6,201	82.47%	1,318	17.53%
Union	3,923	87.39%	566	12.61%
Volusia	140,965	63.72%	80,266	36.28%
Wakulla	10,869	73.24%	3,971	26.76%
Walton	28,024	81.72%	6,267	18.28%
Washington	7,679	84.94%	1,362	15.06%
Totals	4,510,644	59.30%	3,095,786	40.70%

Counties that flipped from Democratic to Republican

- Duval (largest municipality: Jacksonville)
- Hillsborough (largest municipality: Tampa)
- Pinellas (largest municipality: St. Petersburg)
- Seminole (largest municipality: Sanford)
- Miami-Dade (largest city: Miami)
- Osceola (largest municipality: Kissimmee)
- Palm Beach (largest city: West Palm Beach)
- St. Lucie (largest city: Port St. Lucie)

== See also ==
- Florida Commissioner of Agriculture
