= Francis A. Hendry =

American politician (1883–1917)

Francis Asbury Hendry
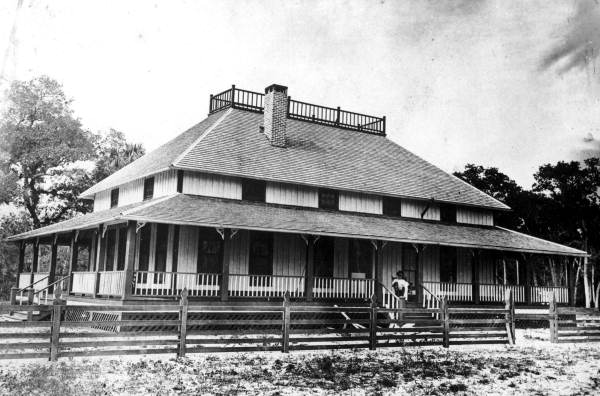
- Francis A. Hendry Home, c. 1890

Member of the Second Constitutional Convention of Florida (1865)

Member of the Florida Senate from the 28th District
- In office 1865–1867

Member of the Florida Senate from the 24th District
- In office 1875–1878

Member of the Florida House of Representatives from Lee County
- In office 1893–1904

Personal details
- Born: November 19, 1833 Thomasville, Georgia
- Died: February 12, 1917 (aged 83) Fort Myers, Florida
- Relations: George W. Hendry (brother)

Military service
- Allegiance: Confederate States of America
- Rank: Captain
- Unit: Cow Cavalry
- Battles/wars: Third Seminole War

Francis Asbury "Berry" Hendry (November 19, 1833 – February 12, 1917) was an American cattle rancher, politician in Florida, and served during the Third Seminole War, and the American Civil War in the Confederate States Army. Hendry was also a state senator for parts of Lee County, and Monroe County (which then included what is now Hendry County, and Collier County), as well as serving as a state representative for Lee County for six terms from 1893 to 1904. He was known by the nickname "Berry" and in later life as "Captain Hendry."

== Early life ==
Hendry was born near Thomasville, Georgia, a son of James Edward Hendry and Lydia Carlton. The family was of English and Scotch ancestry. George W. Hendry was his younger brother. In 1851, his father moved the family and his cattle herd to Hillsborough County, Florida, settling on the North Fork of the Alafia River about twenty-two miles east of the village of Tampa. His father then returned to the Ocholocknee River area of south Georgia to settle his affairs, and died suddenly on January 3, 1852. Nineteen-year-old Berry, his mother, and his siblings decided to remain in Florida.

On March 25, 1852, Berry married Ardeline Ross Lanier (May 10, 1835 – September 6, 1917), a native of Bulloch County, Georgia. Soon thereafter, they moved to the Fort Meade, Florida, area where they started a Florida Cracker Cattle ranch. They marked their cattle with a crop and split in one ear and an upper square in the other. They also branded them with a large "A", Berry's middle initial, as well as his wife's first initial.

The Hendrys lived with the garrison at Fort Meade for a time before building their first home about two miles (3 km) north on a branch of the Peace River, now known as the Berry Hendry Branch.

== Military career ==
=== Third Seminole War ===
During the Third Seminole War, Hendry served with both Capt. William B. Hooker and Capt. Leroy G. Lesley in their independent companies of mounted volunteers. Muster rolls describe him as standing six feet and one inch in height, with grey eyes, and dark hair and complexion. Hendry survived the war having seen little or no action.

=== American Civil War ===
In 1860, on the eve of the American Civil War, Hendry was a Florida Cracker cattleman who retained his father cattle enterprise at 19 years old and helped raise his siblings. He opposed secession after the election of Abraham Lincoln in 1861, but supported his adopted state after it passed a secession ordinance.

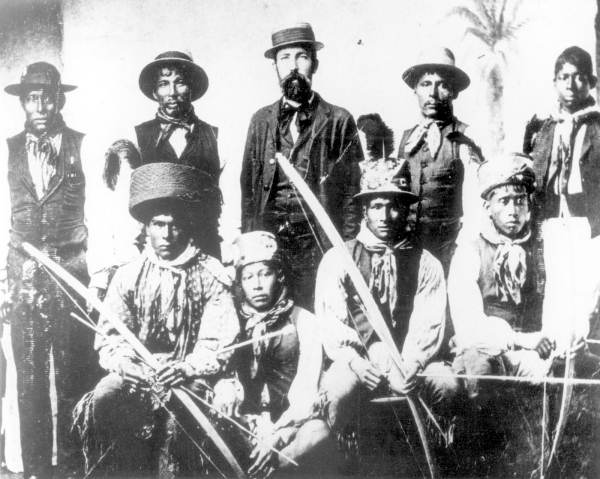
Captain Francis Asbury Hendry (center, standing) with Seminole Indians. 1870 (circa)

On February 1, 1861, before the war really began in earnest, Hendry led efforts to create Polk County, Florida, and was elected to its first Board of County Commissioners. Hendry spent the first three years of the war supplying cattle to the Confederate Commissary Department. But, his work was made difficult by a Federal garrison that occupied old Fort Meade as well as Fort Myers. In 1863, he organized his own cavalry company to keep protect cattle intended for the Confederate States Army. He was given the rank of captain and attached to Colonel C. J. Munnerlyn's Cow Cavalry.

== Political career and later life ==
On October 27, 1857, he was elected to a two-year term on the Hillsborough County Commission.

After Florida surrendered to Federal occupation in the spring of 1865, Hendry represented Polk County at the Second Constitutional Convention in Tallahassee. He was also elected to the Florida Senate representing the 28th district in the sessions of 1865 and 1866, and the 24th district in the sessions of 1875 and 1877. He was elected to the Florida House of Representatives representing Lee County for the sessions of 1893, 1895, 1897, 1899, 1901, and 1903.

After the Reconstruction government was installed in Tallahassee in 1868, former Confederate officers were not welcome to hold elective office on the state level. So, Berry Hendry returned to Polk County, and was appointed to serve on the Board of Public Instruction.

During the Reconstruction Era, Hendry continued to build and improve his cattle empire. He made his new headquarters in the abandoned officers' barracks at Fort Myers, and made contact with buyers from Cuba. He was among the first Florida ranchers to ship cattle to that country through the port of Punta Rassa. By 1876, he had fenced-in some 25,000 acres (101 km^{2}) of range land and owned about 50,000 head of cattle.

On August 12, 1885, Hendry chaired a public meeting held at the schoolhouse in Fort Myers at the corner of Second and Lee Streets. Electors voted to incorporate the town, and Hendry became one of its first councilmen. As a councilman, he led efforts to create Lee County, Florida, in 1887, and was elected to its first Board of County Commissioners.

By 1888, Hendry had moved his ranching headquarters to the vicinity of Fort Thompson. He also began to dispose of much of his Florida Cracker cattle in favor of other breeds in an effort to improve the quality of his stock. He acquired large tracts of marshland along the Caloosahatchee River for grazing. In 1893, Major Hendry was elected to represent Lee County in the state legislature, and served for more than a decade. In 1895, he platted the town of LaBelle, Florida, which he named for his daughters Laura and Belle Hendry.

During his last years, Captain Hendry retired to Fort Myers for better access to medical care. He suffered from chronic nephritis, a kidney disease. He was awarded a monthly pension of twenty dollars by the State of Florida.

== Death and legacy ==
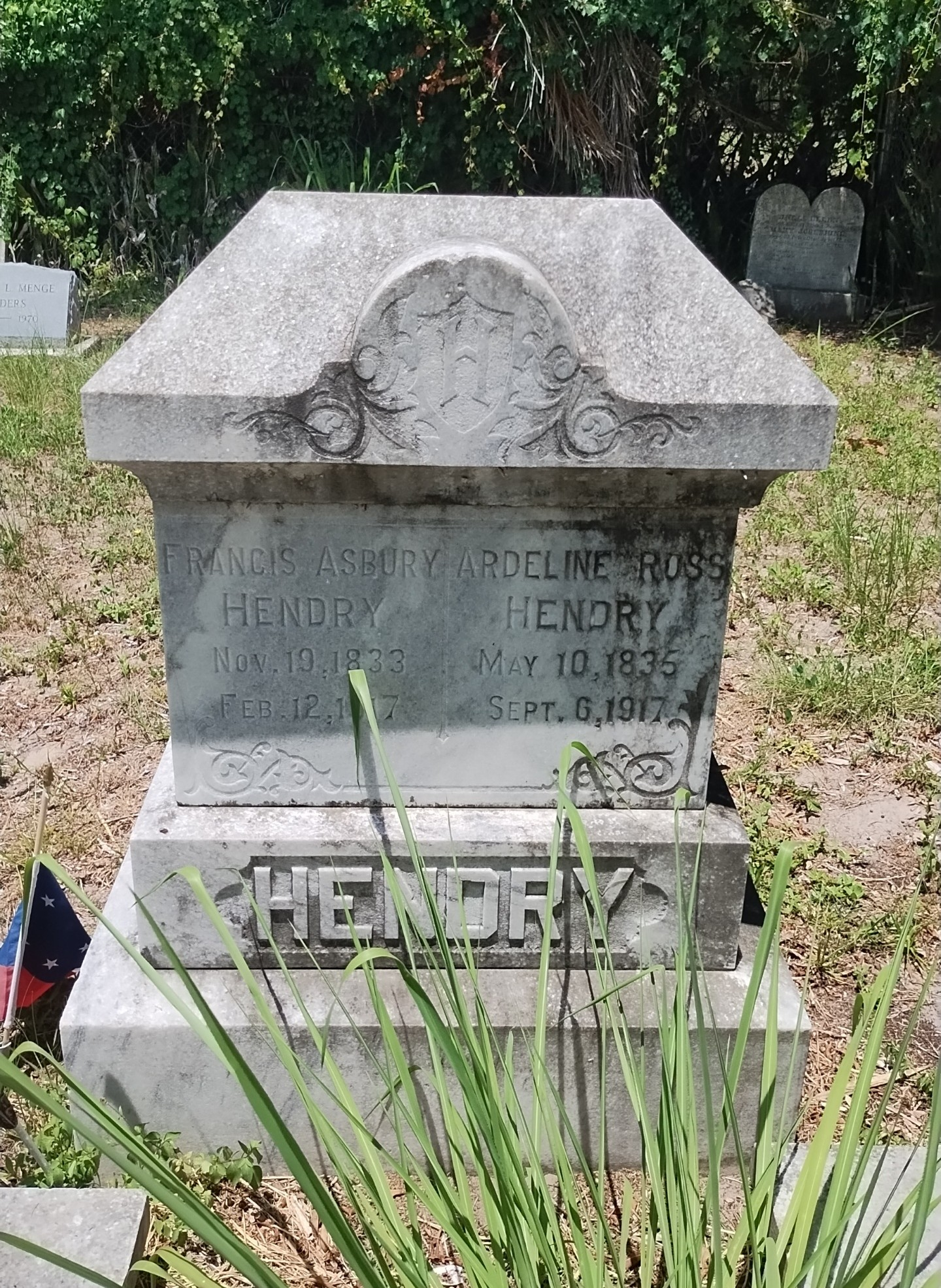
Francis Hendry's grave (2024) in Frierson-Hendry Cemetery, the oldest known private cemetery in Fort Myers, Florida

Hendry died on February 12, 1917, in Fort Myers. He was buried in Frierson-Hendry Cemetery, the oldest private cemetery in Lee County. His wife was buried alongside him.

On May 11, 1923, the state legislature honored him with the creation of Hendry County, Florida, designating LaBelle as its seat of government. His former home, the Captain Francis A. Hendry House is listed as a National Register of Historic Place since 1998. The Immokalee Pioneer Museum at Roberts Ranch has had a replica of Hendry's Confederate officer uniform created, which is sometimes worn for visitors. The Berry Hendry branch of the Peace River was named for the area that once housed his former cabin and land; and the nearby Wash Hendry branch of the Peace River was named for his younger brother's former cabin and land.

In 2015, a Hendry family reunion was held.
