= Frank W. Sams =

American politician (1846–1921)

Francis William Sams Jr. (c. 1846 – February 10, 1921) was a teenage soldier in the American Civil War, a cattle rancher and a state legislator in Florida. He served in the Florida Senate from 1899 to 1909. He was a Democrat.

There is a Sams Avenue in New Smyrna Beach.
