= Fort Thompson, Florida =

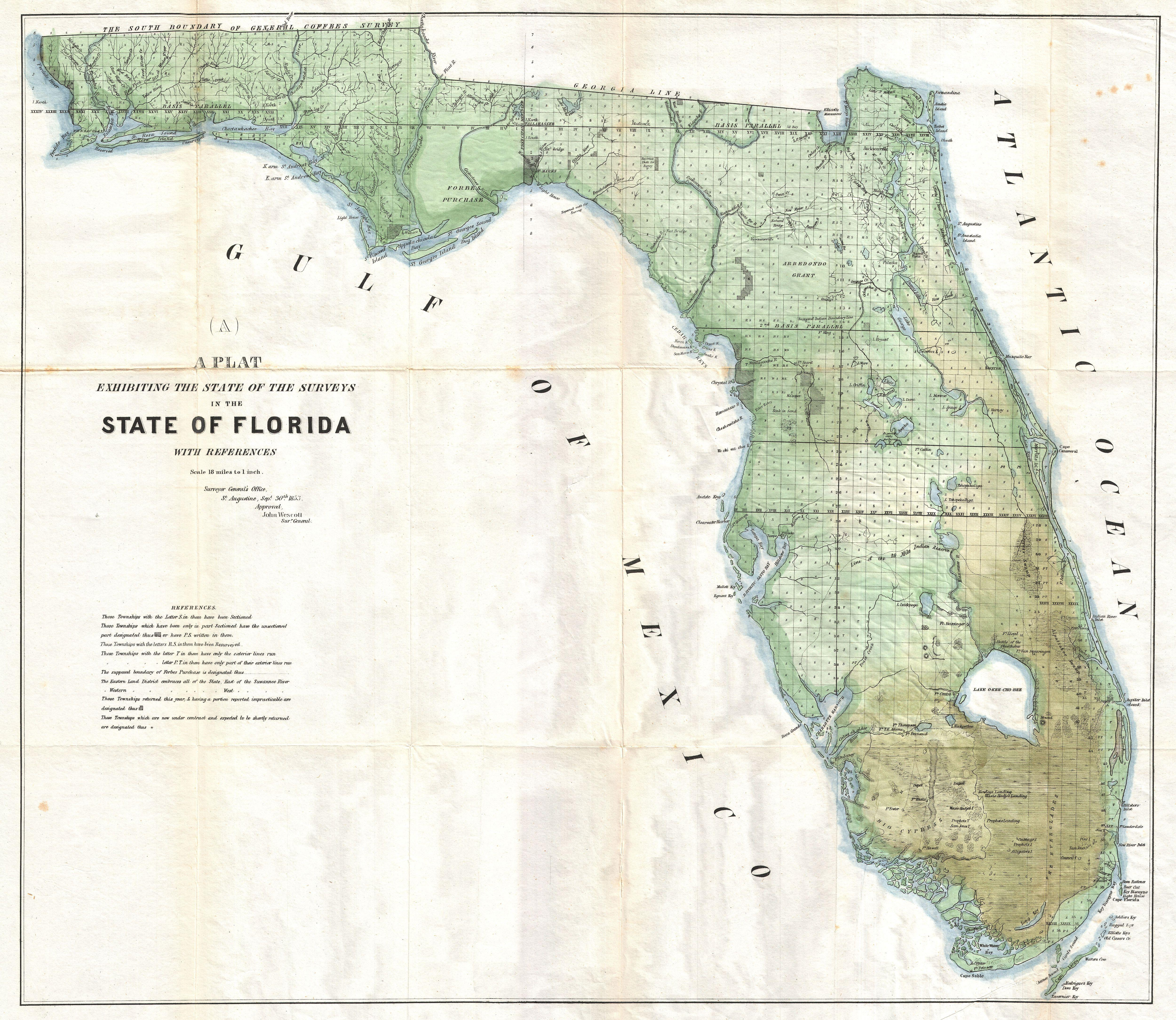
An 1853 plat map of Florida that includes Fort Thompson west of Lake Okeechobee

Fort Thompson was a military post established during the Second Seminole War along the Caloosahatchee River in present-day Hendry County, Florida. The fort was named for Lt. Colonel Alexander Thompson, who was killed in the Battle of Okeechobee in 1837.

The property was acquired by Francis Asbury Hendry who used it for Florida Cracker cattle ranching. It preceded LaBelle, Florida.

During the American Civil War, Union forces advanced inland from the previously occupied Fort Myers and occupied Fort Thompson in an attempt to disrupt the Confederate cattle supply.

The settlement of Caloosahatchee was built around the fort, with a population of 13 in 1870.

The Fort Thompson Hotel was named for the fort. It was managed by Everett Edward Goodno. LaBelle has a Fort Thompson Avenue.

Henry Ford acquired the Fort Thompson property and used it as an experimental rubber plantation.

The Fort Thompson Formation is a geological feature in the area. A historical marker commemorates Fort Thompson's history.

== See also ==
- Fort Denaud, Florida
