= Bob Brannen =

American politician (1927–1990)

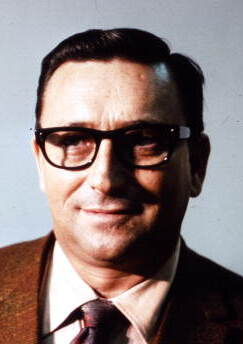
- Brannen in 1970

Member of the Florida House of Representatives from the 56th district
- In office 1968–1970
- Preceded by: Ray Mattox
- Succeeded by: Larry Libertore

Member of the Florida Senate from the 28th district
- In office 1970–1972
- Preceded by: Lawton Chiles
- Succeeded by: Curtis Peterson

Personal details
- Born: July 27, 1927 Lakeland, Florida, U.S.
- Died: December 13, 1990 (aged 63)
- Party: Democratic

Bob Brannen (July 27, 1927 – December 13, 1990) was an American politician. He served as a Democratic member for the 56th district of the Florida House of Representatives. He also served as a member for the 28th district of the Florida Senate.

== Life and career ==
Brannen was born in Lakeland, Florida.

In 1968, Brannen was elected to represent the 56th district of the Florida House of Representatives, succeeding Ray Mattox. He served until 1970, when he was succeeded by Larry Libertore. In the same year, he was elected to represent the 28th district of the Florida Senate, serving until 1972.

Brannen died on December 13, 1990, at the age of 63.
