= Patterson Park (Fort Meade, Florida) =

Park in Florida, United States

- Location within Florida
- Location: 601 N. Charleston Ave. (US Hwy 17), Fort Meade, Florida
- Coordinates: 27°45′41″N 81°48′14″W
- Area: 16.5 acres (6.7 ha)

Patterson Park is a public park in the town of Fort Meade, Florida. It has an area of 16.5-acre (67,000 m^{2}), of which half is water. The park is at an elevation of 148 ft (45 m) and the property was once an open-pit mine. The area was landscaped after the mine was closed.

This park has a number of amenities:

- Observation areas that can be used for fishing.
- Two floating fishing docks.
- An 850 feet (260 m) cement-paved walkway.
- A restroom and concession facility with nearby parking.
- Two gazebos with picnic tables.
- A beach volleyball area.
- Three bodies of water, termed small lakes in two websites.

The three lakes comprise half of Patterson Park's surface area. All three are irregular rectangles, having originally been mine pits. One covers most of the south side of the park and is connected to the other two lakes by small water channels. The northeast lake contains a small fountain in its southeast corner. These lakes are not listed in any of the websites that list lakes (Fishing Works, Hook and Bullet, GoingOutside.com). These lakes can only be fished. No boating or swimming are allowed.
