= Stetson University =

Private university in DeLand, Florida, US

- Former names: DeLand Academy (1883–1885); DeLand College (1885–1886); DeLand University (1886–1889); John B. Stetson University (1889–1994)
- Motto: Pro Deo et Veritate (Latin)
- Motto in English: "For God and Truth"
- Type: Private university
- Established: 1883; 143 years ago
- Founder: Henry Addison DeLand
- Accreditation: SACS
- Religious affiliation: Protestant (Southern Baptist) (1885–1907; 1919–1995); No affiliation (1995–present)
- Academic affiliations: ICUF
- Endowment: $416.1 million (2025)
- President: Chris Roellke
- Provost: Elizabeth A. Skomp
- Students: 3,670
- Undergraduates: 2,339
- Postgraduates: 1,331
- Location: DeLand, Florida, United States; 29.0350°N 81.3026°W
- Campus: 185 acres (75 ha); Small city
- Other campuses: Gulfport; Tampa
- Colors: Green and white
- Nickname: Hatters
- Sporting affiliations: NCAA Division I FCS - ASUN; PFL; MAAC; FIRA
- Mascot: John B.
- Website: stetson.edu

Stetson University is a private university in DeLand, Florida, United States. Established in 1883 as DeLand Academy, it was renamed after hat maker and philanthropist John B. Stetson following his financial support. It is the oldest private college in the state of Florida. The university's main campus in DeLand spans 175 acres (71 ha) with additional campuses in Gulfport and Tampa. The university includes the College of Arts and Sciences, School of Business Administration, School of Music, and the College of Law, offering undergraduate, graduate, and professional programs.

== History ==
Stetson University was founded in 1883 as DeLand Academy after Henry Addison DeLand, the principal founder of the town. In 1887, the institution was incorporated as DeLand University. In 1889, its name was changed to John B. Stetson University to honor John B. Stetson, a hat manufacturer who made generous donations to the university and served alongside DeLand as a founding trustee.

The first director of the academy was John H. Griffith, a minister. When the college was founded, John Franklin Forbes took over as the first president. Lena B. Mathes was an early faculty member. Lincoln Hulley served as president from 1904 to 1934.

Until 1995, Stetson had an affiliation with the Florida Baptist Convention and was considered a "Baptist school".

== Campus ==
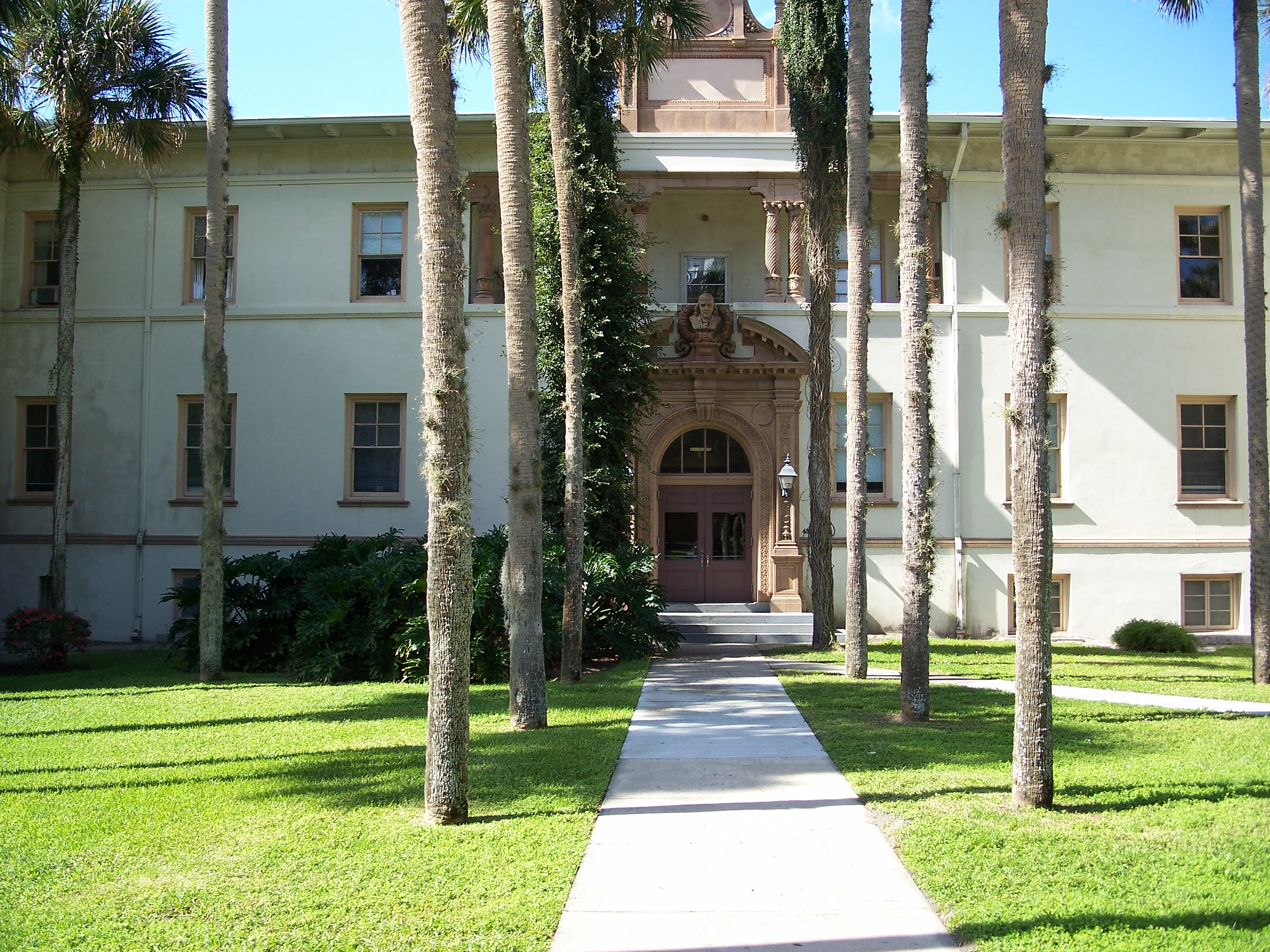
Flagler Hall

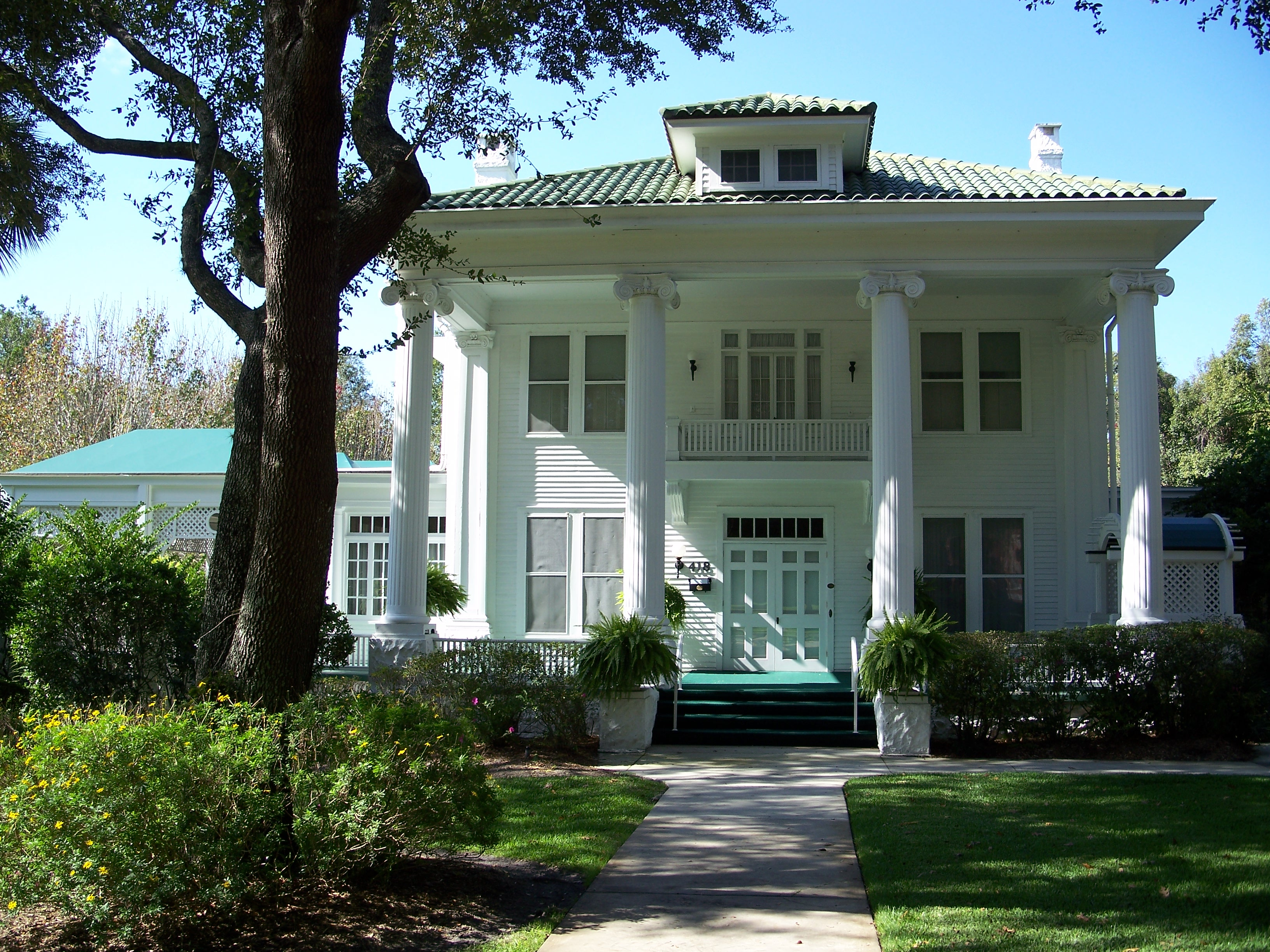
President's House

Stetson University is located roughly halfway between Orlando and Daytona Beach, Florida in DeLand, Florida. The main campus sits just north of the downtown area. The DeLand campus is home to the university's College of Arts and Sciences, School of Business Administration, School of Music, and most graduate programs.

The 175-acre (0.71 km^{2}) campus in DeLand is nationally designated by the National Register of Historic Places as the Stetson University Campus Historic District.

=== DeLand Hall ===
DeLand Hall opened in 1884. The original cost of the building was $4,000. DeLand Hall was known as the first academic building on campus. Today, it is known as the oldest building in Florida in continuous use for higher education. DeLand Hall houses the Office of the President and the offices of other administrators.

=== Lynn Business Center ===
The Lynn Business Center is home for the university's School of Business. Constructed in 2003, Stetson's Lynn Business Center earned LEED certification and became not only Stetson's first green building on campus, but also the first green building in the state of Florida.

=== Lee Chapel ===
Lee Chapel is located in the historic Elizabeth Hall. It is a 100-year-old performance hall that seats 700. The acoustical properties are well-suited for classical music performances. It was built in 1897 and dedicated to the memory of John B. Stetson's late son, Ben, who died at age 6. It is currently named after H. Douglas Lee, who served as Stetson's eighth president from 1987 until 2009. It accommodates up to 787 people. William Sharp, an art professor, designed all the stained glass windows in the chapel. The organ is a 1961 Beckerath Organ. It is made up of 2,548 pipes and came here in 56 crates from Hamburg, Germany.

== Academics ==
Academic rankings

Master's
- Washington Monthly: 316

Regional
- U.S. News & World Report: 7

National
- Forbes: 439
- WSJ/College Pulse: 368

Stetson University offers more than 55 majors and minors leading to the Bachelor of Arts, Bachelor of Science, Bachelor of Music, Bachelor of Music Education, and Bachelor of Business Administration degrees. There are 18 graduate programs in business, law, education, counseling, and fine arts.

The university is accredited by the Commission on Colleges of the Southern Association of Colleges and Schools. The student-faculty ratio is 10–1. Total full-time faculty in all Stetson's colleges and schools is 265.

=== College of Arts and Sciences ===
With 19 academic departments and several interdisciplinary programs, the College of Arts and Sciences is the largest college on campus in terms of total undergraduate majors and total number of faculty. It includes the humanities, natural sciences, social sciences, education and the arts. There is a student to faculty ratio of 12:1.

=== School of Music ===
Performance opportunities for students include the symphony orchestra, band, choirs, opera, musical theater, jazz, chamber music, and solo recitals. The curriculum includes degree options in performance, education, theory, and composition. Music students may combine music study with business, pre-law, and many other fields. The School of Music has been an accredited member of the National Association of Schools of Music since 1938.

=== School of Business Administration ===
Founded in 1897, it is accredited in both accounting and business by the Association to Advance Collegiate Schools of Business. The School of Business Administration offers a customized field of study within business.

=== College of Law ===
The Stetson University College of Law was founded in 1900 in DeLand. In 1954, the law school was relocated to Gulfport, Florida, where Stetson Law still exists today. The college has been a member of the Association of American Law Schools since 1931.

=== Libraries ===
Before the first library was established in 1887, DeLand University had started to accumulate a small collection of books. At this time, fewer than 1,300 volumes were housed on bookshelves in DeLand Hall, sharing space with the science lab. The library collection began to expand rapidly in November 1887 when the college was selected to become Florida's first federal depository. The library has been receiving State of Florida publications since 1968.

In 1906, the university received $40,000 from the Carnegie Corporation of New York. Elizabeth S. Stetson, wife of John B. Stetson, matched Carnegie's contribution allowing for the Sampson Library to be built as a Carnegie library, one of fourteen in the state. Opening in 1908, it was named after university trustee C.T. Sampson, who was a major donor to the Stetson library fund. In 1964, the duPont-Ball Library became the campus's new main library building.

The duPont-Ball Library's databases provide access to 50,000 full-text journals, magazines and newspapers. As of October 2022, the library's physical collection contains 934,251 items organized by Library of Congress Classification.

== Student life ==
Student body composition as of March 17, 2026
Race and ethnicity	Total
White	50%
Hispanic	20%
Black	12%
Other (Note: Other consists of Multiracial Americans & those who prefer to not say.)	6%
Foreign national	9%
Asian	2%
Economic diversity
Low-income (Note: The percentage of students who received an income-based federal Pell grant intended for low-income students.)	37%
Affluent (Note: The percentage of students who are a part of the American middle class at the bare minimum.)	63%

Stetson has approximately 20 honorary academic and professional organizations and over 100 other student organizations on campus. The Greek Community at Stetson consists of approximately 30 percent of the student body, hosting chapters of 8 fraternities and 9 sororities.

=== Patrick Smith Model United States Senate ===
Stetson University hosts a college-level Model United States Senate program (established in 1970) every year in March.

== Athletics ==
Stetson is a member of the National Collegiate Athletic Association, and the university's 20 intercollegiate men's and women's teams compete on the Division I level in the ASUN Conference, the Pioneer Football League (Football Championship Subdivision - FCS) and MAAC – Metro Atlantic Athletic Conference. The school's mascot is "John B.", a stylized version of John B. Stetson, the benefactor for whom the university is named. The basketball, baseball, men's and women's tennis, women's golf, men's and women's soccer, sand volleyball and softball teams have either earned conference championships or gained national rankings or recognition.

Since 1970, the baseball program has earned seven ASUN Conference championships and 16 trips to the NCAA Regionals. In 2013, women's basketball made its third NCAA tournament appearance. The team won the A-Sun Conference Championship in 2005, 2011, and 2013. Stetson also has a signature win in the 2024 NCAA regional against the University of Alabama. Stetson participated in football from 1901 until 1956 achieving an all-time record of 155–127–27 (.545). The football team earned its 100th victory in 1935. In 2010, university officials gathered information and evaluated the feasibility of starting a Division I-AA (now Football Championship Subdivision) non-scholarship program. In March 2011, SU president Wendy B. Libby announced the return of Hatters Football. and the addition of women's lacrosse. In July 2011, Stetson named Roger A. Hughes as head football coach. Stetson's sand volleyball team had its inaugural season in 2012, after the sport was officially approved for conference play. In 2013, both the lacrosse and football teams played their first games.

== Notable alumni ==
- Pam Bondi, 87th United States Attorney General
- Bert Fish, US Ambassador to Egypt, 1933-1941
- Pat Cannon, United States representative from Florida
- Jacob deGrom, professional baseball player
- Louis DeJoy, Postmaster General and CEO of United States Postal Service
- Logan "Walter" Gilbert, professional baseball player
- Joseph Edwards Hendricks, United States representative from Florida
- Corey Kluber, professional baseball player
- Suzanne Kosmas, US congressperson, 2008–2010
- Ashley Moody, U.S. Senator from Florida (2025–present)
- Franca Somigli, soprano
- Yevgeni Starikov (left after 2 years), professional soccer player
- George Tsamis, professional baseball manager
- Ted Cassidy, "Lurch" TV show The Addams Family (1955, B.A., Speech & Drama)
