= Fort Meade Historic District =

Historic district in Florida, United States

- U.S. National Register of Historic Places
- U.S. Historic district
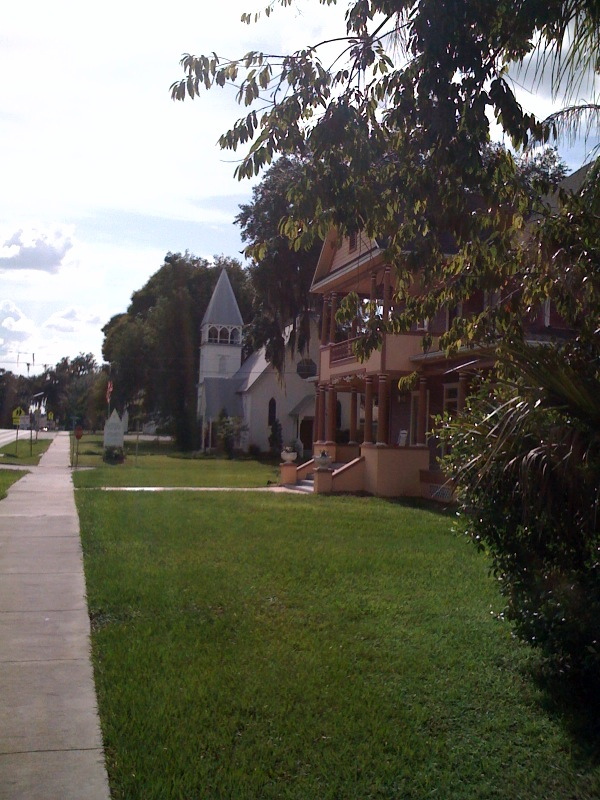
- Reid House, historic home in the district

- Location within Florida Location within the United States
- Location: Fort Meade, Florida
- Coordinates: 27°45′5″N 81°48′7″W
- Area: 1,000 acres (4.0 km^{2})
- NRHP reference No.: 94000781
- Added to NRHP: July 29, 1994

The Fort Meade Historic District is a U.S. historic district (designated as such on July 29, 1994) located in Fort Meade, Florida. The district is bounded by North 3rd Street, Orange Avenue, South 3rd Street and Sand Mountain Road. It contains 151 historic buildings.
