= Katie Edwards-Walpole =

Florida politician

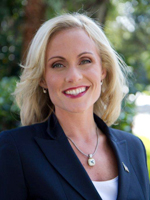

Member of the Florida House of Representatives from the 98th district
- In office November 6, 2012 – November 6, 2018
- Preceded by: Redistricted
- Succeeded by: Mike Gottlieb

Personal details
- Born: February 21, 1981 (age 45) Fort Lauderdale, Florida
- Party: Democratic Party
- Education: Clemson University (B.S.); Florida International University College of Law (J.D.)
- Profession: Attorney

Katie A. Edwards-Walpole (born February 21, 1981) is a Democratic politician and a former member of the Florida House of Representatives, representing the 98th District, which includes parts of Davie, Plantation, and Sunrise in southern Broward County, from 2012 to 2018.

== History ==
Edwards-Walpole was born in Fort Lauderdale into a political family, as her father, Bruce Edwards, served as a Plantation City Councilman, and her uncle, Ted Edwards, served as an Orange County Commissioner. She attended Clemson University, from which she received a degree in agricultural and applied economics in 2002. After graduation, Edwards-Walpole served as the Executive Director of the Miami-Dade County Farm Bureau, which "brought her to Tallahassee on numerous occasions to lobby on agricultural issues." In 2012, Edwards-Walpole graduated from the Florida International University College of Law with her Juris Doctor, while she was working full-time.

== Florida House of Representatives ==
In 2010, when incumbent State Representative Juan C. Zapata was unable to seek re-election due to term limits, Edwards-Walpole ran to succeed him in the 119th District, which stretched from Doral to Florida City in eastern Miami-Dade County. She faced Republican nominee Frank Artiles, Tea Party candidate Alex Fernandez, and independent candidate Graziella Denny. Edwards-Walpole ultimately lost to Artiles, receiving 44% of the vote to his 52%.

Edwards-Walpole experienced more success, however, in 2012, when the state's legislative districts were redrawn and State Representative Franklin Sands was unable to seek re-election. She opted to run in the newly created 98th District, which included her hometown of Plantation. In the Democratic primary, she faced Louis Reinstein, and she earned the endorsement of the Sun-Sentinel, which praised both candidates as "the types of political candidates one wishes could be cloned" because they were so "compelling." However, the Sun-Sentinel ultimately endorsed Edwards-Walpole, praising her as a centrist who, despite being "a safe party vote on most issues," earned an "A" rating from the NRA Political Victory Fund. Edwards-Walpole ultimately defeated Reinstein by a solid margin, winning 63% of the vote to his 37%, and advancing to the general election, where she faced Republican nominee Cara Pavalock. The Sun-Sentinel endorsed Edwards-Walpole once again, praising her as "[e]ager, energetic and knowledgable[sic]" who would be an effective legislator "without having to undergo a huge learning curve." She campaigned on reforming the Citizens Property Insurance Corporation, providing tax credits to businesses so that they could grow, cutting down on the costs of prisons by "looking at cheaper alternatives for first-time non-violent offenders," and de-emphasizing the importance of standardized tests. During the last month of the primary campaign, she was forced to campaign from her bedside, as she was hospitalized for "a major health issue" and made fundraising calls "while she was being rolled into the operating room." Ultimately, Edwards-Walpole defeated Pavalock in a landslide, receiving 67% of the vote to her opponent's 33%, winning her first term in the legislature.

During the 2013 legislative session, Edwards-Walpole sponsored a bill that would allow judges to avoid mandatory minimums and exercise discretion with regard to prescription drug addicts; under the law, prescription drug addicts were treated the same way in the criminal justice system as were the traffickers. She argued, "What my bill does is recognize that we need some discretion at the judicial level during sentencing. We need some criteria and factors in place to make sure that the person who hooked on oxycotin with 7 pills does not go to jail for three years. You guys know that person belongs either in drug court or in treatment. They don't belong in a prison." Following a failed attempt to pass legislation that would have legalized medical marijuana in 2013, Edwards-Walpole authored legislation during the 2014 legislative session with Republican State Representative Matt Gaetz that would allow "people suffering from cancer, Lou Gehrig's disease and other illnesses" to be receive "cannabis-derived therapies rich in cannabidiol," which would otherwise be illegal. She urged Governor Rick Scott to sign the legislation, which passed overwhelmingly in both chambers of the legislature, declaring, "With more than 125,000 children and 380,000 adults in Florida with severe epilepsy and other debilitating illnesses, it's time to ease the suffering and bring relief. I urge the governor to promptly sign Senate Bill 1030 into law."

In 2014, Edwards-Walpole was re-elected to her second term in the legislature without opposition.
