= Senator Bullard =

Senator Bullard may refer to:

- Bill Bullard Jr. (1943–2020), Michigan State Senate
- David Bullard (politician) (born 1978), Oklahoma State Senate
- Dwight Bullard (born 1977), Florida State Senate
- Larcenia Bullard (1947–2013), Florida State Senate
