= Florida's 117th House of Representatives district =

Florida district

Florida's 117th State House of Representatives district
Representative
Kevin Chambliss; D–Florida City

Florida's 117th House of Representatives district elects one member of the Florida House of Representatives. It contains parts of Miami-Dade County.

== Members ==
- Charles C. Papy Jr.
- Bill Flynn (1978–1980)
- Scott W. McPherson (1980–1982)
- Tom Gallagher (1983–1987)
- Susan Guber (1986–1992)
- Eladio Armesto-Garcia (1992–1994)
- Carlos Lacasa (1994–2002)
- Julio Robaina (2002–2010)
- Michael Bileca (2010–2012)
- Kionne McGhee (2012–2020)
- Kevin Chambliss (since 2020)
