= Susan Guber =

American politician

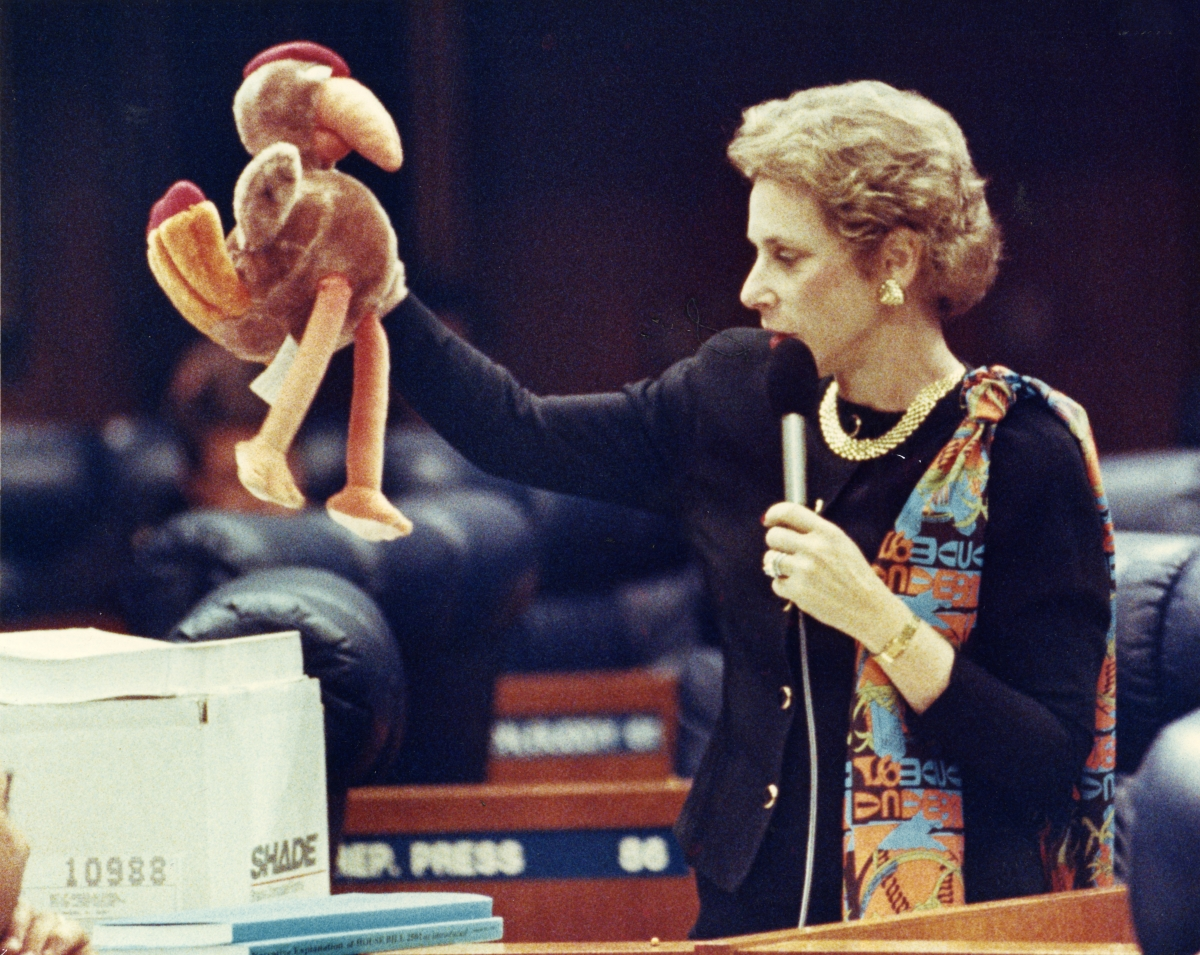
- Guber in 1991

Member of the Florida House of Representatives from the 117th district
- In office 1986–1992
- Preceded by: Tom Gallagher
- Succeeded by: Eladio Armesto-Garcia

Personal details
- Born: 1938 or 1939 (age 86–87) Brookline, Massachusetts, U.S.
- Party: Democratic
- Education: University of Chicago

Susan Guber (born 1938/1939) is an American politician in the state of Florida. She was a member of the Florida House of Representatives for the 117th district between 1986 and 1992.

== Early life ==
Guber grew up in Brookline, Massachusetts, where her father was a trial attorney. As a child, she was family friends with Michael Dukakis and in his 1988 presidential campaign, she was the first state legislator to endorse him, before he had officially announced his candidacy. She received her bachelor's degree from the University of Chicago. She married Michael, a gastroenterologist, and moved to Florida in 1964. The couple have two daughters, one of whom became an entertainment lawyer and the second of whom became a movie producer.

She worked initially as a teacher and was a member of the Dade County chapter of the Women's Political Caucus and the Citizens Coalition of Dade County Public Schools. Prior to running for office, she worked as a lobbyist for hospitals and a legislative aide to county commissioner Bill Oliver.

== Political career ==
In the 1986 general election, Guber was first elected to the Florida House of Representatives for the 117th district, replacing Tom Gallagher. She defeated Republican Jim Brodie by 386 votes. She ran against former legislator Scott McPherson in the 1988 general election, receiving 16,469 votes to his 14,170 votes. She was the chair of the programs subcommittee of the education committee and chair of the vocation and technical education committee.

In 1989, she opposed a bill sponsored by fellow Democrat Willie Logan Jr. in the small business and economic development committee, which would have required obscene records which were out of reach of children. Guber then moved on to write a bill with the aim of classifying abortion as a protected personal decision under the state constitution in response to proposed anti-abortion legislation in the October 1989 special legislative session. She also sponsored a bill requiring background checks to purchase a gun, which was combined with a bill written by Ron Silver, and a bill to punish the sale of guns to unsupervised minors.

In the 1990 general election, she ran against Republican Gary Gerrard. One of his supporters filed suit to request her financial records under chapter 119 of the Florida Statutes but the proceedings were combined with a similar case, Locke v. Hawkes, by the Supreme Court of Florida. She was appointed to the state job training council and the HIV services planning council.

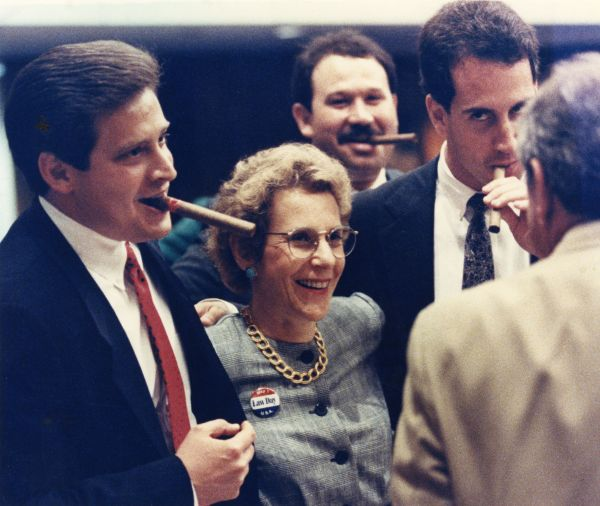
Guber with fellow legislators in 1990 after protesting cigar exemption

Guber introduced legislation to allow terminally ill patients to refuse sustenance which was approved by the House in May 1990, following amendments by Republican Jim King. The following year, she sponsored an additional bill to expand the provisions. Guber spoke out against the 1990 proposed House bill that increased taxes on cigarettes but not cigars – calling it "a male chauvinist exemption". She introduced the House Bill 1863 in 1992, which would transfer $5 million from the state coastal water protection fund to a clean-up fund for polluted water, in response to contaminated well water in the neighborhood of Suniland.

In 1992, her constituency was redistricted to include fellow legislator Mario Díaz-Balart. As a result, she instead contested District 40 of the Florida State Senate in the 1992 election. However, she lost to Daryl L. Jones in the Democratic primary.

== Later life ==
After leaving office, Guber became the vice president of governmental affairs at South Miami Hospital and the head of the Adopt-A-School committee.
