= Michael Góngora =

American politician

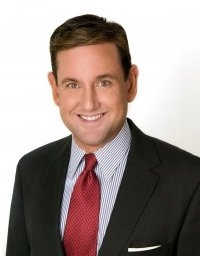

Member of the Miami Beach City Commission from Group 3
- Incumbent
- Assumed office 2017
- Preceded by: Joy Malakoff
- In office 2009–2013
- Preceded by: Victor M. Diaz Jr.
- Succeeded by: Joy Malakoff

Member of the Miami Beach City Commission from Group 5
- In office 2006–2007
- Preceded by: Luis R. Garcia Jr.
- Succeeded by: Edward L. Tobin

Personal details
- Born: Michael Christian Góngora; March 27, 1970 (age 56) Coral Gables, Florida, U.S.
- Party: Democratic
- Education: University of Miami (BSBA, JD)
- Website: michaelgongora.com

Michael Christian Góngora (born March 27, 1970) is an American politician and lawyer from Miami Beach, Florida who is currently serving his third term as Commissioner of the City of Miami Beach City Commission. Gongora was first elected in 2006 and most recently in 2017. Besides his legal practice, Gongora currently serves as a legal and political analyst and is regularly featured on many Spanish networks including Telemundo, America Teve and Mira TV.

== Education and legal career ==
Góngora attended the University of Miami School of Law where he earned his Juris Doctor (cum laude). After graduation, he was a partner in his own firm in Miami Beach. Góngora is currently a partner at Becker & Poliakoff, where he is the lead community association litigator in the Miami office.

== Political career ==
Góngora was Miami Beach's first and only openly gay elected commissioner and vice mayor. Góngora was also the first openly gay Hispanic to win elected office in the state of Florida. As commissioner, he pushed for the first citywide recycling program, founded the city sustainability committee and helped create a sustainability plan designed to encourage developers to erect greener buildings. Gongora was active in passing a stormwater master plan to resolve flooding in the City of Miami Beach.

In 2013 he ran for mayor of Miami Beach but lost to Philip Levine, coming in second of four candidates running with nearly 40% of the vote following a recount. It was found that Levine had spent approximately $2 million to receive 5,639 votes in the most expensive election in the history of Miami Beach.

In 2021, he sued the City of Miami Beach to run for a third term, alleging that term limits approved by the voters did not apply to his candidacy. Gongora lost the lawsuit when a judgment was entered in favor of the City of Miami Beach. Gongora then switched races and is running for the mayor of Miami Beach in the 2023 elections.

=== Offices held ===
Prior to being elected to the Miami Beach Commission, Góngora held local elected and appointed leadership and governmental roles throughout Miami-Dade County, including:

- Member, Miami Beach Community Development Advisory Committee
- Member, Miami Beach, Zoning Board of Adjustment
- Member, Miami Beach, Design Review Board
- Special Magistrate, Miami Dade County, Value Adjustment Board for Property Tax Appeals
- Special Master, Miami Beach Code Enforcement
- Member, Miami Beach, Condominium Reform Task Force
- City of Miami Beach Mayor's Blue Ribbon Tourism Task Force, after 9/11
- Vice Chair, City of Miami, Code Enforcement Board

=== Environmental issues ===
Góngora created the first Green Ad Hoc Committee (now referred to as the Sustainability Committee) for Miami Beach in 2007. This committee created a sustainability plan, and focused on ways of improving recycling within the city.

=== LGBT issues ===
Góngora's involvement with the LGBT community in Miami Beach includes advocating for the creation of the city's Human Rights Commission, and works with local organizations such as the Miami-Dade Gay & Lesbian Chamber of Commerce as well as local, state and national groups such as Aqua Foundation, Gay Pride Committee, National Gay and Lesbian Task Force, Trevor Project, SAVE Dade, Equality Florida, and Unity Coalition. He introduced resolutions to the City Commission in support of the Uniting American Families Act (UAFA, S. 424/H.R. 1024), and the Jeffrey Johnston Stand Up For All Students Act against cyberbullying, in the U.S. House of Representatives. He hosts or sponsors events by SOBAP (South Beach AIDS Project), GLSEN (Gay, Lesbian & Straight Alliance) and the Trevor Project, the only national 24/7 suicide prevention helpline for LGBT youth.

== Civic work ==
Góngora is involved in civic organizations in Miami Beach. He was the chairman of the Environmental Coalition of Miami and the Beaches (ECOMB) from 2007-2009.

He was legal advisor to the Miami Beach Latin Chamber of Commerce.

He served as a Director for the Advisory Board for Neighborhood Lending Partners, a lending consortium designed to provide funding to build affordable housing. He also represented the City of Miami Beach at Florida Atlantic University in a program for elected officials to help implement and design projects in their municipalities. Góngora also served as president of the Miami Beach Bar Association, the local lawyers association. During his tenure in 2007, the Miami Beach Bar Association opened the North Beach Pro Bono Law Clinic, staffed by volunteer attorneys that provide pro bono consultations with qualifying residents.

On a national level, Góngora is a member of the National Association of Latino Elected and Appointed Officials (NALEO). He was on the Florida Host Committee for the annual NALEO conference held in Florida in 2012.

== Awards, honors, and distinctions ==
- In 2003, the Miami SunPost newspaper named Góngora as one of the "Power 50 of Miami."
- In 2003 and 2007 Góngora was a City of Miami Beach Key Recipient for Outstanding Service to the Community.
- In December 2006, Góngora was chosen as Wire Magazine Person of the Year.
- In 2009, Góngora received the Business Leader Events 2009 "South Florida Movers & Shakers" Award
- In 2009, Góngora was selected as the Florida Trend's Florida Legal Elite 2009.
- In June 2011, Góngora was invited to speak at the Commencement Ceremony for the University of Caserta on June 4 to promote tourism for the City of Miami Beach with a special emphasis on cultural tourism exchanges from Italy. The University of Caserta issued Góngora an Honorary Doctorate Degree from the Faculty of Touristic Science.
- In July 2011, Góngora was named one of the "Top Ten Innovators in Miami-Dade County" by the SunPost newspaper.
- In March 2014, Gongora was selected as one of the 50 Most Influential Out People in South Florida by South Florida Gay Newspaper in its Annual "Out 50" Issue
- In September 2014, Gongora was the top vote-getter and chosen as "Favorite Local Hero" in the Pink Flamingo Awards recognizing him as the first and only openly gay elected Commissioner and Vice Mayor in Miami Beach
- In October 2015, Gongora was invited by President Obama and Representative Wasserman Schultz to attend the President's Hispanic Heritage Month reception at the White House
- In November 2015, Gongora was named one of the Top 100 LGBT Movers & Shakers in Florida by Florida Agenda Magazine
- In December 2015, Gongora was elected as President of the Miami Beach Bar Association for 2016
- In November 2020, Gongora was voted as the Best Politician in Miami-Dade County by the readers of South Florida Gay News. Best of 2020: Miami-Dade
