= Fullard =

Fullard is a surname. Notable people with the surname include:

- George Fullard (1923–1973), English sculptor
- Jacques Fullard (born 1974), South African racing cyclist
- John Fullard (1907–1973), Welsh tenor in Australia
- Philip F. Fullard (1897–1984), English First World War flying ace

== See also ==
- Bullard
