= Bulliard =

Bulliard is a surname. Notable people with the surname include:

- Jean Baptiste François Pierre Bulliard (1742–1793), French physician and botanist
- James Bulliard (born 1978), Canadian actor

== See also ==
- Bullard
