= Michael Bileca =

Florida State Representative

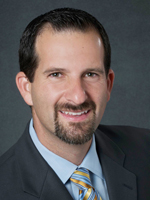

Member of the Florida House of Representatives
- In office November 2, 2010 – November 6, 2018
- Preceded by: Julio Robaina
- Succeeded by: Vance Aloupis
- Constituency: 117th district (2010–2012); 115th district (2012–2018)

Personal details
- Born: March 8, 1970 (age 56) Miami, Florida
- Party: Republican
- Spouse: Vivian Salazar
- Children: Gabriel, Benjamin, Nathan
- Education: Tulane University (B.S.M.); Northwestern University (M.B.A.)
- Profession: Entrepreneur

Michael Bileca (born March 8, 1970) is a Republican politician and a former member of the Florida House of Representatives, representing the 115th District, which includes north-central Miami-Dade County, stretching from Doral to Palmetto Bay, from 2012 to 2018. Bileca previously represented the 117th District from 2010 to 2012.

== History ==
Bileca was born in Miami, and attended Tulane University, where he graduated with a bachelor of science in management degree in 1992. Afterwards, he attended Northwestern University and graduated from the Kellogg School of Management with a Master of Business Administration in 2002. Bileca founded the Towncare Dental Partnership, which expanded to employ over six hundred workers.

== Florida House of Representatives ==
In 2010, when incumbent Republican State Representative Julio Robaina could not seek another term due to term limits and instead unsuccessfully ran for the Florida State Senate, Bileca ran to succeed him in the 117th District, which was based in north-central Miami-Dade County, including the cities of South Miami, Coral Gables, and Cutler Bay. In a crowded Republican primary that included Ralph Rosado, Ana Alliegro, Jose M. Pazos, Juanky Robaina, Marcus Rivchin Jr., and Ernesto Martinez, Bileca came out in first place with 40% of the vote. In the general election, he faced Democratic nominee Lisa V. Lesperance, who was endorsed by the Miami Herald, which noted that she was "best suited to represent constituents" in the district. Ultimately, Bileca was elected overwhelmingly over Lesperance, winning over 60% of the vote.

When Florida House districts were redrawn in 2012, Bileca opted to run for re-election in the 115th District, which, although it contained much of the territory that Bileca had previously represented, was drawn quite differently than the 117th District. He faced opposition from Eugenio Perez in the Republican primary, whom he was able to easily defeat with 76% of the vote. In the general election, he faced Jeffrey Solomon, the Democratic nominee. Though the race was closer than Bileca's first campaign two years prior, he still won out over Solomon with 53% of the vote.

During the 2014 legislative session, Bileca once again blocked legislation that would have mitigated the infectious disease epidemic among drug users in Florida, by allowing a needle-exchange program. The epidemic costs tax payers tens of millions of dollars, as drug users, many homeless, crowd public hospitals for treatment. He also sponsored legislation that allowed the parents of children with severe disabilities to have "personalized learning accounts" that could be used "to pay for tuition at private schools, tutoring, learning materials or services such as applied behavior analysis, speech-language pathology and physical therapy." He argued, "One of the things you see is how much these families struggle. They know what their child needs."

Florida House of Representatives
Preceded by Julio Robaina	Member of the Florida House of Representatives from the 117th district 2010–2012	Succeeded by Kionne McGhee
Preceded by José Félix Díaz	Member of the Florida House of Representatives from the 115th district 2012–2018	Succeeded by Vance Aloupis
