= Joe Gersten =

American politician

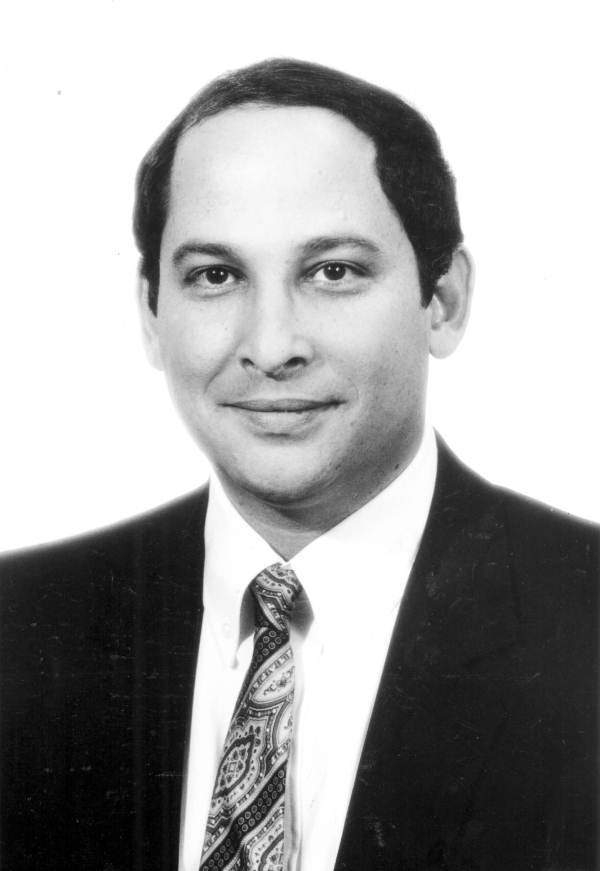

Member of the Florida Senate from the 34th district
- In office 1982–1986
- Preceded by: Sherman Winn
- Succeeded by: Ileana Ros-Lehtinen

Member of the Florida House of Representatives from the 109th district
- In office 1974–1981
- Preceded by: Bob Hartnett
- Succeeded by: Robert R. Reynolds

Personal details
- Born: Joseph Morris Gersten; July 19, 1947 (age 79) Miami, Florida, U.S.
- Party: Democratic
- Spouse: Janet Cutler
- Education: New York University; Sophia University; University of Maryland; University of Miami School of Law
- Occupation: lawyer

Joseph Morris Gersten (born July 19, 1947) was an American politician in the state of Florida.

He served in the Florida House of Representatives from 1974 to 1981 (109th district). He also served in the Florida Senate from 1982 to 1986.

In 1993 he fled to Australia after prosecutors wanted to question him about the theft of his baby blue Mercedes-Benz and allegations that it was stolen while he was having sex with a prostitute at a crack house in Miami. In 2001, U.S. Rep. Dan Burton an Indiana Republican, released a report alleging Gersten was the victim of prosecutorial misconduct by Janet Reno, a former Miami-Dade state attorney.
