= Bullard =

Bullard is a surname. Notable people with the surname include:

- Alan Bullard (born 1947), British composer
- Bill Bullard Jr. (1943–2020), American politician
- Charles W. Bullard, 19th-century American criminal
- David Bullard (born 1952), South African writer
- Denys Bullard (1912–1994), British farmer and politician
- Sir Edward Bullard (1907–1980), British geophysicist
- Edward B. Bullard (born 1943), American politician and educator
- Edward P. Bullard Sr. (1841–1906), American founder of the Bullard Machine Tool Company
- Edward P. Bullard Jr. (1872–1953), second president of the Bullard Machine Tool Company
- Eugene Bullard (1895–1961), African-American military pilot
- George Purdy Bullard, Arizona Attorney General 1912–1915
- Sir Giles Bullard (1926–1992), British diplomat
- Henry Adams Bullard (1788–1851), U.S. Congressman from Louisiana, 1831–1834 & 1850–1851
- Isaac Bullard (1774–1808), American politician
- Isaac Bullard American religious leader
- James B. Bullard, American economist
- Jimmy Bullard (born 1978), English footballer
- Jonathan Bullard (born 1993), American football player
- Sir Julian Bullard (1928–2006), British diplomat
- Larcenia Bullard (1947–2013), American politician
- Laura Curtis Bullard (1831–1912), American writer and women's rights activist
- Louis Bullard (1956–2010), American football player
- Mark W. Bullard (1822–1902), American pioneer
- Martyn Lawrence Bullard (born 1967), English interior designer
- Matt Bullard (born 1967), American basketball player
- Mike Bullard (comedian) (born 1957), Canadian broadcaster
- Mike Bullard (ice hockey) (born 1961), Canadian ice hockey player
- Orson Flagg Bullard (1834–1906), Pennsylvania state representative
- Pat Bullard (born 1959), Canadian television writer and comedian
- Sir Reader Bullard (1885–1976), British diplomat and author
- Robert D. Bullard (born 1946), American sociologist and academic administrator
- Robert Lee Bullard (1861–1947), United States Army general
- Roger Bullard (1884–1935), American architect
- Rose Talbot Bullard (1864–1915), American medical doctor and professor
- Samuel A. Bullard (1853–1926), American architect, politician, and university trustee
- Sara Bullard, American writer
- Sarah Bullard (born 1988), American lacrosse player
- Silas Bullard (1841–1922), American politician and jurist
- Thaddeus Bullard (born 1977), American professional wrestler, ring name Titus O'Neil
- William H. G. Bullard (1866–1927), United States Navy admiral
- William Bullard (Dedham) (1594–1686), early resident in Dedham, Massachusetts
