= Alan Becker =

Alan Becker may refer to:

- Alan Becker (animator) is an American animator known for web series "Animator vs. Animation"
- Alan S. Becker (1946–2020), American politician, member of the Florida House of Representatives
