= Cynthia Stafford =

American politician

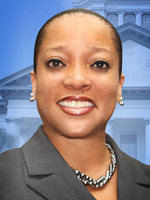

Member of the Florida House of Representatives from the 109th district
- In office November 2, 2010 – November 6, 2018
- Preceded by: James Bush
- Succeeded by: James Bush

Personal details
- Born: July 11, 1967 (age 59) Miami, Florida, U.S.
- Party: Democratic
- Education: St. Thomas University (BA, JD)
- Profession: Attorney

Cynthia A. Stafford (born July 11, 1967) is a Democratic politician and a former member of the Florida House of Representatives, representing the 109th District, which includes northeastern Miami-Dade County, from 2010 to 2018.

== History ==
Stafford was born in Miami, and attended St. Thomas University, where she graduated with a degree in communication arts in 1993. She later graduated from the St. Thomas University School of Law in 1999, and later worked as an attorney. Stafford also worked for Congresswoman Carrie P. Meek as a legislative aide.

== Florida House of Representatives ==
In 2008, when incumbent State Representative Dorothy Bendross-Mindingall was prevented from seeking an additional term due to term limits, Stafford ran to succeed her in the Democratic primary in the 109th District. In a crowded, nine candidate field, she narrowly lost to former State Representative James Bush by 132 votes, receiving 27% of the vote to Bush's 28%.

Two years later, Bush declined to run again, so that he could instead run for Congress, and Stafford ran to succeed him. She faced Bush's wife, Bernadine Bush; Bess McElroy; and Roy Hardemon in the Democratic primary, whom she defeated with 43% of the vote. She was unopposed in the general election. In 2012, when Florida House of Representatives districts were redrawn in 2012, Stafford remained in the 109th District, as her home and most of the territory that she had previously represented remained in the district. Once again, she faced Bernadine Bush in the primary, but Bush did not present a significant challenge to her, and she defeated her opponent in a landslide, receiving 64% of the vote. She was unopposed in the general election and won her second term uncontested.

While serving in the legislature, Stafford took a strong stance against legislation that passed through the state legislature that would "overhaul the alimony system by ending life-long payments and allowing judges to change existing deals," condemning the bill as "one-sided, anti-woman, and mean-spirited." She also opposed legislation that would expedite the foreclosure process in Florida, noting, "The bill appears to diminish the rights of homeowners and consumers, while attempting to steamline the process." In 2014, Stafford joined with State Senator Dwight Bullard to propose legislation that would have raised the minimum wage in the state from $7.93 to $10.10 per hour, arguing that it would not only help families make ends meet, but would help businesses as well, observing, "When people are making more, they will spend more."

In 2014, Stafford was re-elected to her third term in the legislature without opposition.

She attempted to be run for the Florida Senate in 2020, however was defeated in the primary.
