= Tom Gallagher =

American politician (born 1944)

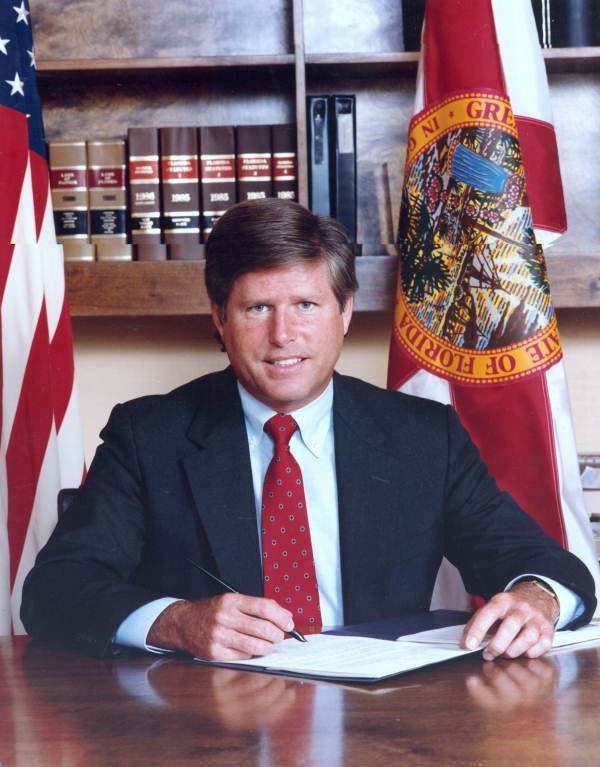
- Official portrait, c. 1989-95

1st Chief Financial Officer of Florida
- In office January 3, 2003 – January 2, 2007
- Governor: Jeb Bush
- Preceded by: Office established
- Succeeded by: Alex Sink

23rd Treasurer, Insurance Commissioner, and Fire Marshal of Florida
- In office January 3, 2001 – January 3, 2003
- Governor: Jeb Bush
- Preceded by: Bill Nelson
- Succeeded by: Office abolished
- In office January 3, 1989 – January 3, 1995
- Governor: Bob Martinez; Lawton Chiles
- Preceded by: Bill Gunter
- Succeeded by: Bill Nelson

Education Commissioner of Florida
- In office January 5, 1999 – January 3, 2001
- Governor: Jeb Bush
- Preceded by: Frank Brogan
- Succeeded by: Charlie Crist

Member of the Florida House of Representatives from the 117th district
- In office 1983–1987
- Preceded by: Scott W. McPherson
- Succeeded by: Susan Guber

Member of the Florida House of Representatives from the 111th district
- In office 1974–1983
- Preceded by: Carl Singleton
- Succeeded by: Roberto Casas

Personal details
- Born: February 3, 1944 (age 82) Wilmington, Delaware, U.S.
- Party: Republican
- Occupation: Insurance Agent
- Website: Official website

Military service
- Allegiance: United States
- Branch/service: United States Army

C. Thomas Gallagher III (born February 3, 1944) is an American politician, financier, and insurance agent from the state of Florida and a member of the Republican Party. Gallagher holds the distinction of having served more years as an elected state official than any other individual in Florida history.

He began his career in the Florida House of Representatives, where he served from 1974 to 1987. He was then the Treasurer, Insurance Commissioner and Fire Marshal of Florida from 1989 to 1995, the Education Commissioner of Florida from 1999 to 2001 and the Treasurer, Insurance Commissioner and Fire Marshal of Florida again from 2001 to 2003.

After 2003, his office was merged with that of Comptroller to form the Chief Financial Officer of Florida, which he held from 2003 to 2007. Gallagher has also run unsuccessfully for the United States Senate in 2000 and four times for Governor of Florida: in 1982, 1986, 1994 and 2006.

== Early life and family ==
Gallagher was raised in Delaware where he participated on the high school swim team. In 1961, he entered the University of Miami with a partial athletic scholarship. After graduating, Gallagher enlisted in the United States Army with the 3rd U.S. Infantry Regiment. Gallagher was honorably discharged and returned to Miami to start a business career.

Gallagher was married to his second wife, Laura Wilson, from 1998 to 2011. Wilson comes from a sixth-generation Florida family. The Gallaghers have a son, Charlie, born in 2000.

== Early political career ==
=== Florida House of Representatives ===
Gallagher began his political career when he was elected to the Florida House of Representatives in 1974. He ran in the 111th district and defeated the Democratic nominee, attorney Alan Rosenthal, by 51% to 49%. He was re-elected in 1980, defeating John Cosgrove by 62% to 37%. He briefly ran for Governor of Florida in 1982 but dropped out early on after realising that incumbent Democrat Bob Graham would be re-elected. He was, defeating U.S. Representative Louis A. Bafalis in a landslide by 65% to 35%.

Gallagher was re-elected from the 117th district in 1982, defeating attorney Charlene Carres by 57% to 43%. His final race was in 1984, when he defeated real estate agent and former actor Seth Sklarey by 70% to 30%. In the House he served as Minority Whip from 1980 to 1982. In 1984, he proposed a 10-year freeze on state taxes and spending. He declined to run for re-election in 1986, deciding instead to enter the Republican primary for Governor.

=== 1986 gubernatorial election ===
In the election, he faced fellow state representative Chester Clem, former U.S. Representative Louis Frey, Jr. and Tampa Mayor Bob Martinez. His running mate was State Representative Betty Easley. She had been running for Commissioner of Education but dropped out to pursue the office of lieutenant governor. Martinez finished first with 244,417 votes (43.80%) and advanced to a runoff with Frey, who came second with 137,967 votes (24.72%). Gallagher came third with 131,265 votes (23.52%) and Clem finished last with 44,409 votes (7.96%). Gallagher endorsed Martinez, who won the run-off and the general election. In September 1987, Martinez appointed Gallagher as the Secretary of the Department of Professional Regulation.

== Statewide office ==
=== Treasurer, Insurance Commissioner and Fire Marshal ===
In 1988, Gallagher ran in a special election for the office of Treasurer, Insurance Commissioner and Fire Marshal of Florida to fill the last two years of the term of Democrat Bill Gunter, who had resigned to run for the U.S. Senate. He won the Republican nomination handily, taking 459,451 votes (76.48%) to Jeffrey L. Latham's 94,608 (15.75%) and Raphael Herman's 46,654 (7.77%).

In the general election, he defeated Democratic State Senator Ken Jenne by 2,223,401 votes (53.47%) to 1,935,137 (46.53%). He and James C. Smith, who was elected Secretary of State of Florida, became the first Republicans to be elected to the State Cabinet since Reconstruction. Smith, who had been appointed to his office in 1987, was the first Republican to serve on the State Cabinet since Reconstruction. He was elected to a full four-year-term in 1990, beating Democratic State Senator George Stuart, Jr. by 1,965,216 votes (57.22%) to 1,469,541 (42.78%).

=== 1994 gubernatorial election ===
In 1994, Gallagher announced his second run for Governor of Florida. In the Republican primary, he faced former state Commerce Secretary (and future Governor) Jeb Bush, Florida Secretary of State James C. Smith, Florida Senate President Ander Crenshaw, former President of Florida Right to Life Kenneth L. Connor, physician Josephine A. Arnold and attorney Bob Bell. Bush came first with 411,680 votes (45.68%) and Smith came second with 165,869 votes (18.41%), enough to force a runoff, but he dropped out and endorsed Bush. Gallagher came third with 117,067 votes (12.99%), Crenshaw fourth with 109,148 (12.11%), Connor fifth with 83,945 (9.31%), Arnold sixth with 8,326 (0.92%) and Bell last with 5,202 (0.58%). Bush went on to narrowly lose the general election to incumbent Democratic Governor Lawton Chiles.

=== Commissioner of Education ===
Out of office for four years, Gallagher ran for Commissioner of Education in 1998. Incumbent Republican Frank Brogan had been running for re-election but was tapped by Governor Jeb Bush to be his running mate in the 1998 election, which they won. Gallagher was unopposed for the Republican nomination and faced Democrat Peter Rudy Wallace, the former Speaker of the Florida House of Representatives in the general election. Gallagher won by 2,185,027 votes (56.54%) to 1,679,893 (43.47%).

=== 2000 U.S. Senate election ===
Two years into his term, Gallagher announced that he was running for the United States Senate in 2000. Florida's "resign-to-run" law requires an incumbent office holder seeking another elective office to submit an irrevocable resignation from the office they currently hold unless that tenure would end anyway before they would assume the new position if elected. The candidate may designate the effective date of the resignation to be in the future, but it must be no later than the date that they would assume the new office.

This compelled Gallagher to submit his resignation as Commissioner of Education early in 2000 when he began to campaign for the U.S. Senate seat. He chose January 3, 2001 as the effective date of his resignation, as that was the date new senators would be sworn in. Democrat Bill Nelson, who had succeeded Gallagher as Treasurer, Insurance Commissioner and Fire Marshal, also filed his resignation as he joined the Senate race.

Gallagher faced U.S. Representative Bill McCollum in the primary and attacked both McCollum and Nelson for their attendance records in their respective jobs. He campaigned on his support for the marriage penalty, lowering the cost of drug prescriptions for seniors, increasing spending on social security and abolishing the federal income tax. However, after just over a month in the race, Gallagher withdrew. He had difficulty fundraising and had less than one-third of the money that McCollum had. He was encouraged to drop out by Governor Bush, Republican Party of Florida Chairman Al Cardenas and others who believed that a divisive and expensive Senate primary would damage the eventual nominee for the general election campaign with Nelson.

=== Treasurer, Insurance Commissioner and Fire Marshal ===
As Gallagher's resignation could not be withdrawn, he instead ran for Treasurer, Insurance Commissioner and Fire Marshal again. As Nelson was resigning, a special election was taking place and following the withdrawal of State Senate President Toni Jennings, the Republicans lacked a top-tier candidate. State Representative Joe Arnall, who had been in the race for a week after Jennings pulled out, immediately withdrew in favour of Gallagher.

After polls showed that Gallagher was favoured for the Republican nomination and was by far the strongest general election candidate, former State Representative and two-time Treasurer, Insurance Commissioner and Fire Marshal nominee Tim Ireland and State Representative Greg Gay also withdrew from the race, leaving Gallagher unopposed in the Republican primary. In the general election against State Representative John Cosgrove, Gallagher won easily, as he was predicted to do, taking 3,363,705 votes (59.01%) to Cosgrove's 2,336,117 (40.99%).

=== Chief Financial Officer ===
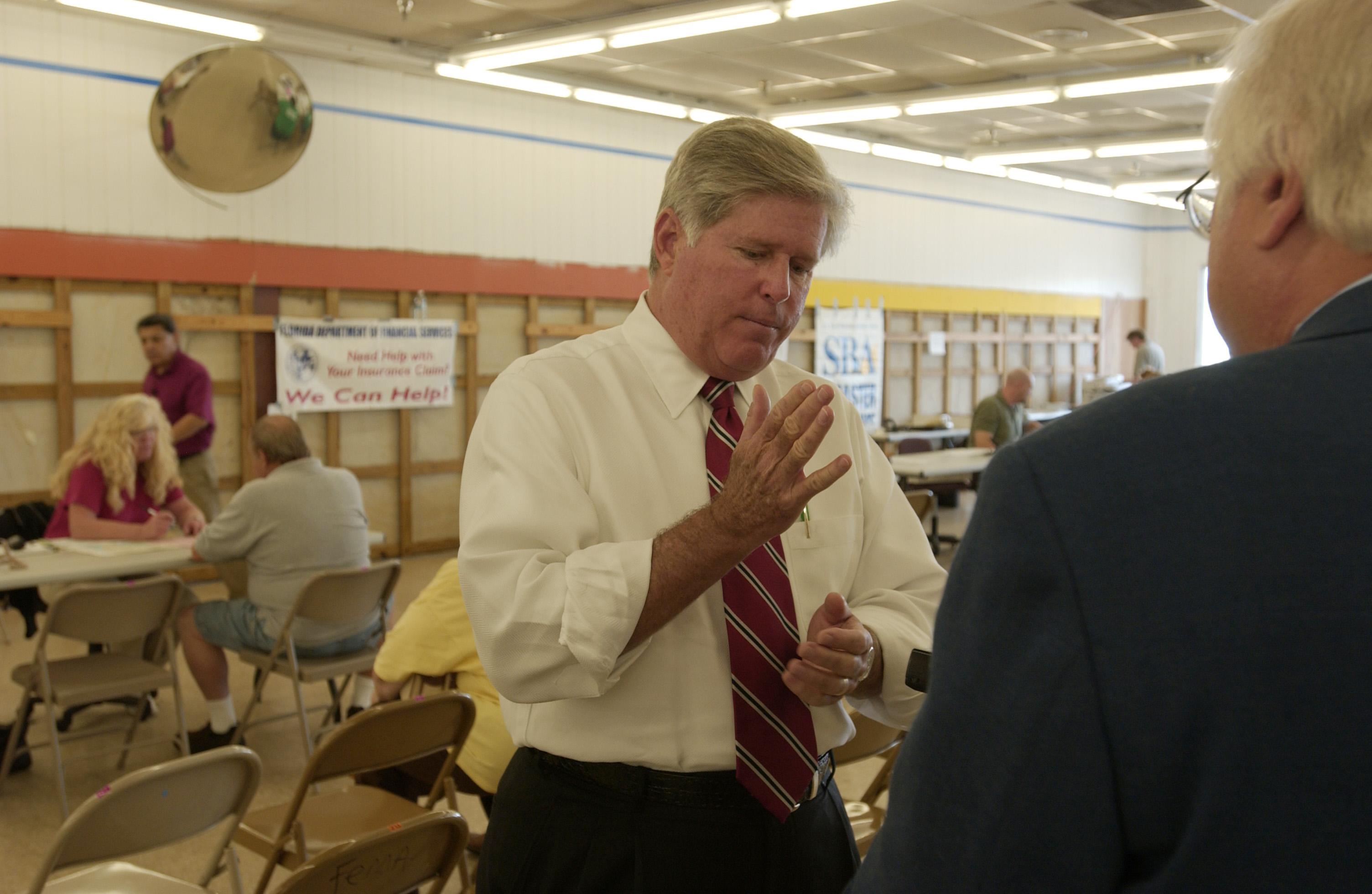
Gallagher talking to a reporter on October 18, 2004, in the aftermath of Hurricane Ivan.

Following reforms made to the Florida Cabinet, certified to the Florida Constitution in 1998 and enacted in 2003, the office of Treasurer, Insurance Commissioner and Fire Marshal was merged with that of Comptroller, forming the Department of Financial Services controlled by the Chief Financial Officer of Florida. Gallagher was elected to the new office in 2002 without opposition.

=== 2006 gubernatorial election ===
In 2006, Gallagher made his fourth run for governor, facing state Attorney General Charlie Crist in the Republican primary. Crist was the favorite to win the nomination and won in a landslide, taking almost double the votes of underdog Gallagher: 630,816 (63.98%) to 330,165 (33.49%). Crist went on to win the general election and took office in 2007 and Gallagher was succeeded as CFO by Democrat Alex Sink.

== Subsequent career ==
After his defeat, Gallagher became involved in charitable and business activities including founding and serving as chairman of Tom Gallagher Insurance Agency and serving on the board of advisers of The TRIAM Consulting Group, Inc. He considered running for Chief Financial Officer again in 2010 and was encouraged by some to run for the U.S. Senate in 2010 but he declined to do so. After Education Commissioner Eric J. Smith announced his resignation in March 2011, Gallagher applied to the Florida Board of Education for his old job. The board enlisted the help of Ray and Associates to winnow down the twenty-six applicants to five that would be interviewed. Gallagher was not among them.

Party political offices
Preceded by Van Poole	Republican nominee for Treasurer, Insurance Commissioner, and Fire Marshal of Florida; 1988, 1990	Succeeded by Tim Ireland
Preceded by Frank Brogan	Republican nominee for Education Commissioner of Florida; 1998	Succeeded by Charlie Crist
Preceded by Tim Ireland	Republican nominee for Treasurer, Insurance Commissioner, and Fire Marshal of Florida; 2000	Succeeded by Office abolished
First	Republican nominee for Chief Financial Officer of Florida; 2002	Succeeded by Tom Lee
Florida House of Representatives
Preceded by Carl Singleton	Member of the Florida House of Representatives from the 111th district 1974–1983	Succeeded by Roberto Casas
Preceded by Scott W. McPherson	Member of the Florida House of Representatives from the 117th district 1983–1987	Succeeded by Susan Guber
Political offices
Preceded by Bill Gunter	Treasurer, Insurance Commissioner, and Fire Marshal of Florida; 1989–1995	Succeeded by Bill Nelson
Preceded by Frank Brogan	Education Commissioner of Florida; 1999–2001	Succeeded by Charlie Crist
Preceded by Bill Nelson	Treasurer, Insurance Commissioner, and Fire Marshal of Florida; 2001–2003	Succeeded by Office abolished
Preceded by Office established	Chief Financial Officer of Florida; 2003–2007	Succeeded by Alex Sink
