= Jeff Gautier =

American politician

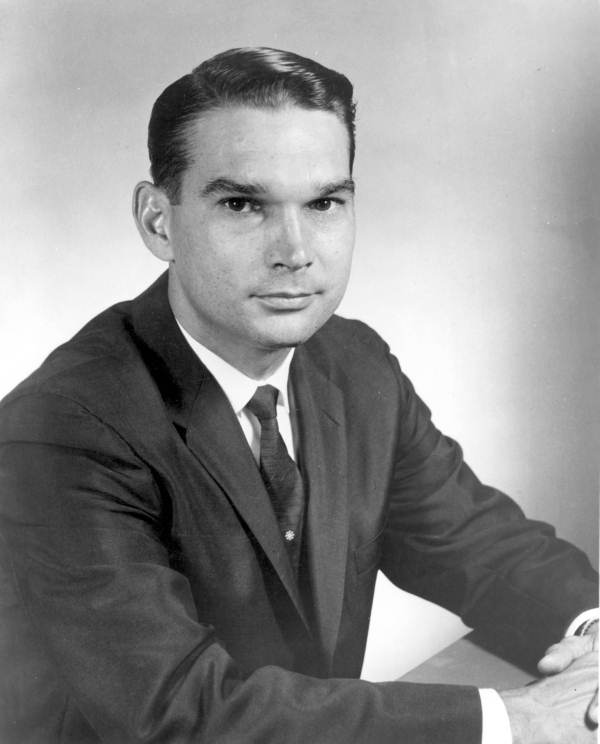

Member of the Florida House of Representatives from the 119th district
- In office November 7, 1972 – November 5, 1974
- Preceded by: Granville Crabtree
- Succeeded by: Bill Flynn

Member of the Florida House of Representatives from the 109th district
- In office November 5, 1968 - November 7, 1972
- Preceded by: Carl Singleton
- Succeeded by: Bob Hartnett

Member of the Florida House of Representatives from the 103rd district
- In office 1967 - November 5, 1968
- Preceded by: district created
- Succeeded by: Carl Singleton

Member of the Florida House of Representatives from the Dade district
- In office 1966 - 1967

Personal details
- Born: March 2, 1935 San Antonio, Texas, U.S.
- Died: July 6, 2007 (aged 72)
- Party: Democratic
- Education: Riverside Military Academy, University of Florida, University of Miami
- Occupation: attorney

Jefferson Davis Gautier Jr. (March 2, 1935 – July 6, 2007) was a politician and lawyer in the American state of Florida. He served in the Florida House of Representatives. He first got elected in 1966 to the Dade district, which he served until 1967 which eventually got abolished and was redistricted to the 103rd district. He served the 103rd district from 1967 - 1968, the 109th district from 1968 to 1972 and the 119th district from 1972 to 1974.

Gautier was the grandson of a Miami pioneer and signer of the city's incorporation, Thomas Nicholas Gautier Jr.

Davis died on July 6, 2007, at the age of 72.
