= Frank Artiles =

American politician

- official portrait, circa 2013

Member of the Florida Senate from the 40th district
- In office November 8, 2016 – April 21, 2017
- Preceded by: Miguel Díaz de la Portilla
- Succeeded by: Annette Taddeo

Member of the Florida House of Representatives
- In office November 2, 2010 – November 8, 2016
- Preceded by: Juan C. Zapata
- Succeeded by: Robert Asencio
- Constituency: 119th district (2010–2012); 118th district (2012–2016)

Personal details
- Born: April 22, 1973 (age 53) Los Angeles, California, U.S.
- Party: Republican
- Spouse: Aimee Sontag
- Children: 2
- Education: Florida State University (BS); St. Thomas University (JD); University of Miami (LLM)
- Profession: Public adjuster and appraiser

Military service
- Allegiance: United States
- Branch/service: United States Marine Corps
- Unit: 4th Air Naval Gunfire Liaison Company
- Battles/wars: Operation Iraqi Freedom

Frank Artiles (born April 22, 1973) is a Cuban-American Republican politician from Florida. He served three terms in the Florida House of Representatives, representing parts of Miami-Dade County from 2010 to 2016, before being elected to the Florida Senate in 2016. He resigned from the Senate on April 21, 2017, after using racial slurs and other profanities against fellow senators. Artiles was also accused of Campaign finance violations and Election fraud and was sentenced to 60 days in jail, five years of probation and 500 hours of community service. He is a former Marine Reservist who served in Operation Iraqi Freedom.

== Early life ==
The son of Cuban immigrants, Artiles was born in Los Angeles, California, in 1973, and moved to the state of Florida in 1975. He attended Florida State University, graduating with a degree in criminal justice and criminology in 1995. Following graduation, Artiles joined the United States Marine Corps in 1998 and served through 2006. He attended the St. Thomas University School of Law, from which he received his Juris Doctor in 2000, and the University of Miami School of Law, receiving his Master of Laws in real property development in 2001.

== Military service ==
Artiles is a former Marine Reservist. He served with the 4th Air Naval Gunfire Liaison Company (ANGLICO) in the Marine Forces Reserve in West Palm Beach. He was deployed to Port of Spain, Trinidad and Tobago, in April 2002 as part of Operation Weedeater, part of a drug operation with the Drug Enforcement Administration. Artiles served as part of Operation Iraqi Freedom, deployed for two months to Qatar in 2003 as a field radio operator and did not directly support or deploy to Iraq. During his service, Artiles received the Presidential Unit Citation, the Global War on Terrorism Expeditionary Medal, the Armed Forces Reserve Medal, the National Defense Service Medal, the Meritorious Unit Commendation, the Navy and Marine Corps Medal, and the Selected Marine Corps Reserve Medal.

== Florida House of Representatives ==
In 2002, following the reconfiguration of the state's legislative districts, Artiles opted to run for the Florida House of Representatives in the 119th District, which stretched from Doral to Florida City in eastern Miami-Dade County. He faced Juan C. Zapata, Tim Hyman, and Armando Pomar in the Republican primary, and narrowly lost to Zapata, receiving 32% of the vote to Zapata's 36%, Hyman's 29%, and Pomar's 4%. Artiles ran against Zapata, who was then the incumbent, again in 2004, but lost by a wide margin, winning only 36% of the vote to Zapata's 64%. When Zapata was unable to seek re-election in 2010 due to term limits, Artiles once again ran in the 119th District, and this time, won the primary election unopposed. He advanced to the general election, where he faced Katie Edwards, the Democratic nominee, Tea Party candidate Alex Fernandez, and independent candidate Graziella Denny. Ultimately, Artiles emerged victorious, scoring 52% of the vote to Edwards's 44%.

When the state's legislative districts were redrawn in 2012, Artiles was moved into the 118th District, which retained most of the territory that he had previously represented in the 119th District. He won the Republican primary unopposed, and faced only write-in opposition in the general election, resulting in a landslide victory to his second term in the legislature.

During the 2014 legislative session, Artiles sponsored legislation that made electronic cigarettes illegal for minors to use. Though the bill initially contained a provision that Artiles hoped would result in a statewide ban on e-cigarettes, an amendment sponsored by fellow Republican State Representative Bill Hager stripped the provision from the bill that "would have prevented local governments from creating their own rules on e-cigarettes and tobacco products." Following a unanimous vote in support of the bill, Artiles remarked, "At the end of the day, the state of Florida has acted before the federal government in protecting our children from contaminating their lungs with vaporizing devices and e-cigarettes." Additionally, Artiles worked with State Senator Jeff Brandes to author legislation that would have repealed the red-light camera law in the state, arguing that the cameras were not needed to improve safety. He declared, "We currently have the tools in our toolbox to stop the red-light infractions from occurring, we do not need the red light cameras today in Florida."

In 2015, Artiles filed a bill titled "Single-Sex Public Facilities", along with fellow representatives Dennis K. Baxley, Daphne Campbell, Matt Gaetz, Mike Hill, George Moraitis, Ray Rodrigues, and R. Stone, proposing that public bathrooms be limited to people by biological sex. This caused backlash from the LGBT community. The bill died in committee.

During this time Artiles was also alleged to have punched a student in the face while at a bar near the capitol building in Tallahassee, a few hours before the 2015 legislative session was to start.

== Florida Senate ==
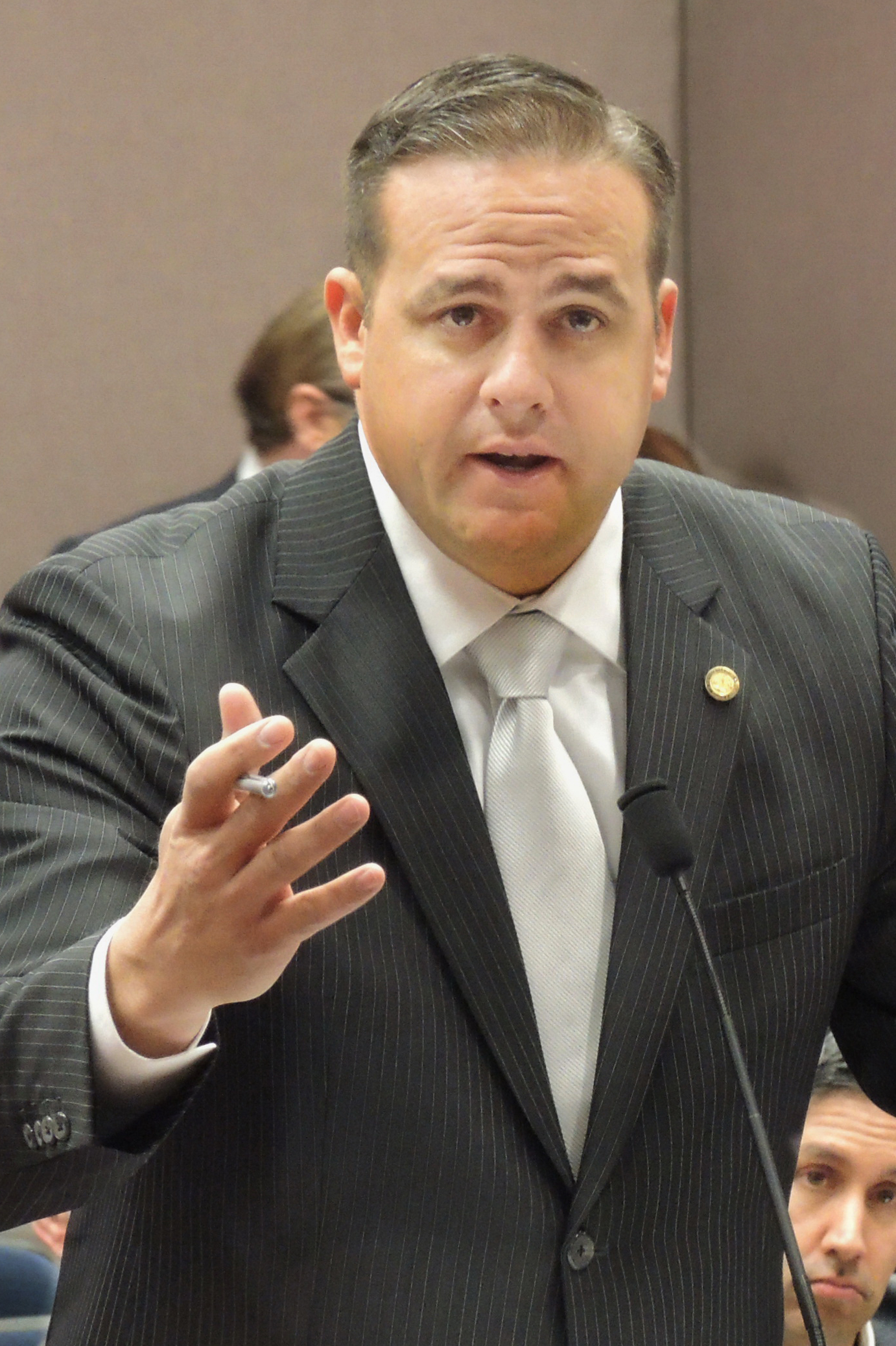
Artiles in 2014

In 2016, after court-ordered redistricting created a redrawn Senate district in his area, Artiles opted to run for the seat against incumbent Democratic Senator Dwight Bullard. Artiles was aided by the new district's demographics, which was 75% Hispanic. Artiles's campaign ran a series of ads criticizing Bullard for touring Israel with a guide from the pro-Palestinian Boycott, Divestment and Sanctions movement, and for his support of Black Lives Matter, which Artiles's campaign called a "terrorist organization". Artiles ultimately won the general election, 51 to 41%.

In the preliminary committee meetings before the 2017 Senate session began, Artiles proposed SJR 134, a bill that, effectively, would require Miami-Dade County to elect a county-wide sheriff. In 1996, Miami-Dade voters changed the structure of the local government to allow the mayor to appoint a police director for the county. SJR 134 would remove this power from the mayor. The bill courted controversy with other Miami-Dade senators and local activists, who accused Artiles of selling out his constituents

== Legal Controversies ==
=== Use of racial slurs ===
On April 17, 2017, Artiles, over drinks at the Governors Club with two black senators, called one of them a "bitch" and a "girl," referred to six Republican senators as "niggers," called the Republican Senate President Joe Negron a "pussy," and used the phrase "fucking asshole." He later claimed that he used the word "niggas" instead of "niggers," suggesting that his usage was appropriate.

Artiles later made a public apology on the Senate floor, and a formal complaint was filed with the Senate Rules Committee by Senator Perry Thurston, requesting an investigation and Artiles' expulsion.

=== Campaign finance violations ===
On April 20, 2017, Artiles's friends learned that the Miami Herald was looking into the expense records of Artiles's PAC, "Veterans for Conservative Principles", which had hired a former Hooters "calendar girl" for $2,000 and a Playboy model 'Miss Social', neither of whom had any political experience.

The investigation had requested the personnel files of the women who were listed by the PAC as consultants or who had been introduced by the senator as interns, and was questioning the women. The next morning, before the Senate investigation had begun, Artiles resigned, calling his continued presence in government a distraction and apologizing again.

In a special election held in September 2017 to fill the vacant seat, Artiles was succeeded as Senator by Democrat Annette Taddeo.

=== Election fraud ===
In December 2020, Artiles took credit for the election of Republican Ileana Garcia to the Florida Senate, by recruiting Alex Rodríguez, an acquaintance of Artiles, to run. Alex Rodríguez, an auto parts salesman who did not declare a party affiliation and did not campaign, has the same last name as the Democratic incumbent José Javier Rodríguez. Alex Rodríguez obtained over 6,300 votes which could have gone to Democrat José Javier Rodríguez. Ileana Garcia won by only 32 votes. At an election night party, Artiles bragged about tipping the results of the election.

In March 2021, Artiles was arrested in connection with the scheme, as it was alleged that he had bribed Alex Rodríguez to enter the race and siphon votes away from José Javier Rodríguez. In a sworn affidavit, three attendees of an election party where Artiles made the comments about recruiting Alex Rodriquez, later received threatening legal letters from Artiles. At an election night party, Artiles bragged about tipping the results of the election.

Artiles was charged with making two or more excessive campaign contributions, conspiracy to make excessive campaign contributions, and false swearing regarding voting or elections. Prosecutors filed additional charges against both Artiles and Rodriguez on April 8, 2021. On August 24, 2021, Rodriguez pleaded guilty to felony charges of accepting illegal campaign donations and lying on campaign documents, and agreed to testify against Artiles.

== Personal life ==
Artiles is married to Aimee Artiles, with whom he has two daughters. Since 2008, Artiles and his wife have run a charity organization called Angel Share that raises money for needy families in the Miami area.

Florida House of Representatives
Preceded by Juan C. Zapata	Member of the Florida House of Representatives from the 119th district 2010–2012	Succeeded by Jeanette Nuñez
Preceded by Dwight Bullard	Member of the Florida House of Representatives from the 118th district 2012–2016	Succeeded by Robert Asencio
Florida Senate
Preceded by Miguel Díaz de la Portilla	Member of the Florida Senate from the 40th district 2016–2017	Succeeded by Annette Taddeo
