= Charles C. Papy Jr. =

American politician (1927–2009)

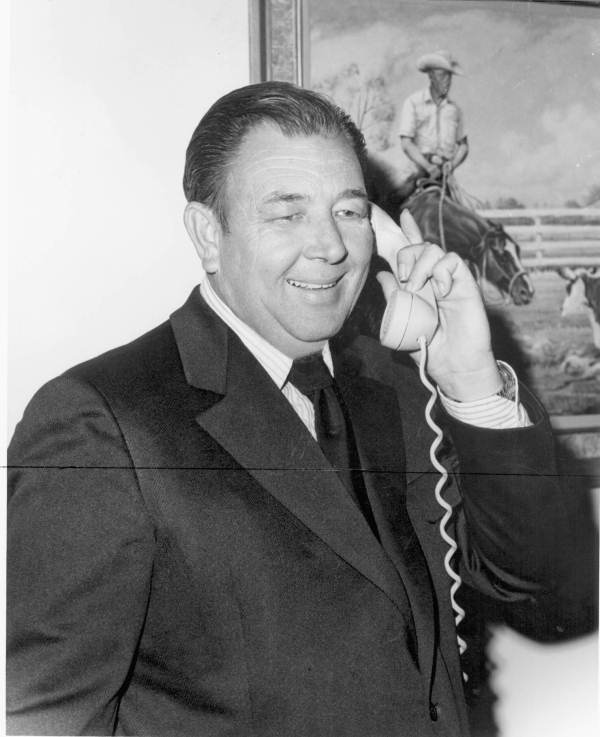
- Papy in 1972

Member of the Florida House of Representatives from the 117th district
- In office 1972–1978
- Preceded by: Jim K. Tillman
- Succeeded by: Bill Flynn

Personal details
- Born: August 18, 1927 Miami, Florida, U.S.
- Died: January 2, 2009 (aged 81)
- Party: Democratic
- Spouse: Deborah Papy
- Education: University of Miami

Charles C. Papy Jr. (August 18, 1927 – January 2, 2009) was an American politician. He served as a Democratic member for the 117th district of the Florida House of Representatives.

== Life and career ==
Papy was born in Miami, Florida, the son of Charles C. Papy Sr. and Mary Crane. He attended the University of Florida and the University of Miami.

In 1972, Papy was elected to represent the 117th district of the Florida House of Representatives, succeeding Jim K. Tillman. He served until 1978, when he was succeeded by Bill Flynn.

Papy died on January 2, 2009, at the age of 81.
