= Carl Singleton =

American politician

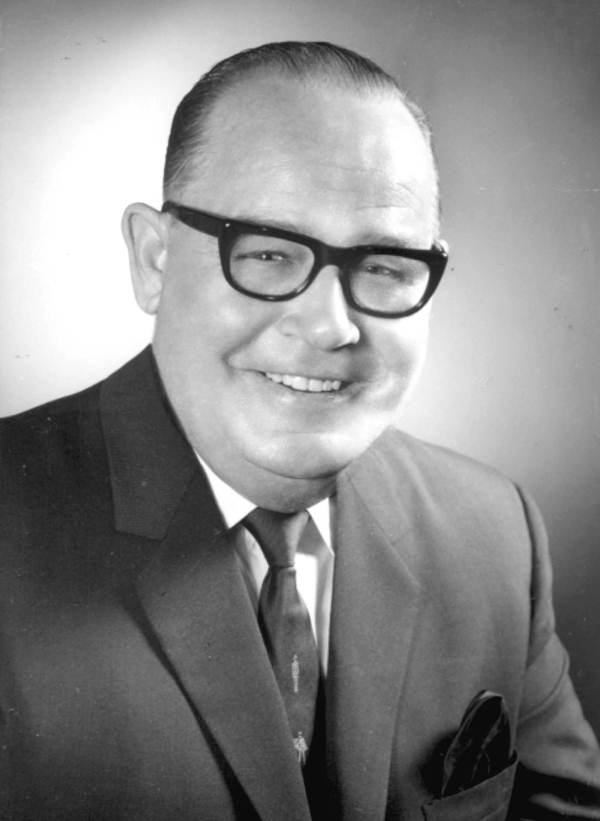
- Singleton in 1969

Member of the Florida House of Representatives from Dade County
- In office 1966–1967

Member of the Florida House of Representatives from the 109th district
- In office March 1967 – November 1968
- Preceded by: District established
- Succeeded by: Jeff Gautier

Member of the Florida House of Representatives from the 103rd district
- In office 1968–1972
- Preceded by: Jeff Gautier
- Succeeded by: Alan S. Becker

Member of the Florida House of Representatives from the 111th district
- In office 1972–1974
- Preceded by: Louis Wolfson II
- Succeeded by: Tom Gallagher

Personal details
- Born: December 16, 1903 Indianapolis, Indiana, U.S.
- Died: February 9, 1974 (aged 70) Coral Gables, Florida, U.S.
- Party: Democratic
- Spouse: Dorothy Evelyn Duffy
- Children: 1

Carl A. Singleton (December 16, 1903 – February 9, 1974) was an American politician. He served as a Democratic member for the 103rd, 109th and 111th district of the Florida House of Representatives.

Singleton was born in Indianapolis, Indiana, and had two brothers and a sister. He moved to Florida in 1939. Singleton worked in a liquor store which he had established. He had worked as a business executive.

Singleton died in February 1974 of cancer at his home in Coral Gables, Florida, at the age of 70.
