= Hugo Black Jr. =

American attorney and legal author (1922–2013)

- Born: Hugo Lafayette Black Jr. April 29, 1922; Birmingham, Alabama, U.S.
- Died: July 22, 2013 (aged 91); Pinecrest, Florida, U.S.
- Education: University of Alabama (BA); Yale University (LLB)
- Spouse: Bessie Graham Hobson
- Children: 3, including Hugh

Hugo Lafayette Black Jr. (April 29, 1922 – July 22, 2013) was an American attorney and legal author.

== Biography ==
Black was born in 1922 in Birmingham, Alabama to future U.S. Senator from Alabama and Associate Justice of the U.S. Supreme Court, Hugo Lafayette Black and Josephine Foster. He was married to Bessie Graham Hobson (1923–2000) and they had three children, Elizabeth, Margaret and Hugo Black III.

After the younger Black graduated from high school, he went to the University of Alabama until he was drafted into the Army and stayed stateside during the World War II era. He then went back to the University of Alabama and in 1946 graduated with an A.B. in English. Then in 1949, he received an LL.B. from Yale University, where he was a member of the Board of Editors of the Yale Law Journal and president of Yale Law School Student Association and graduated second in his class. He was admitted to practice law in the states of Alabama and Florida, as well as several Federal District Court of Appeals, and the Supreme Court of the United States.

After graduating from Yale Law, he returned to Birmingham where he began a labor law practice. In 1952, Black considered following in his father's footsteps by entering politics. "I definitely had politics in mind," he wrote in his book about his father. That year, his father told him to come to Washington, D.C. and warned him that if he was elected to Congress he would be under constant political attack at home because the high court would soon have some important decisions dealing with school segregation, according to Justice Black biographer Roger Newman. As a result, the younger Black decided not to run and stayed in Alabama. After the Supreme Court's 1954 decision in Brown vs. Board of Education ordered the desegregation of public schools, the younger Black received threats of cross burning and children were taunted at school. By the early 1960s, he moved his family to Pinecrest, Florida, to escape the harassment.

Black was a founding member of Kelly, Black, Black & Kenny, in Miami, which later became Kelly, Black, Black, Byrne & Beasley. He practiced there for over 30 years, and then continued to practice law at the firm Hugo L. Black Jr., P.A., until his death. Hugo was listed in the Best Lawyers in America for 20 years. He was also a life member of the American Law Institute. He was a Trustee of the U.S. Supreme Court Historical Society (1988–2003), and the Eleventh Circuit Court Historical Society (1987–1992).

== Books written ==
- My Father: A Remembrance (New York, Random House: 1975)
- The Opening Statement (Practising Law Institute, 1984)
- Florida Evidentiary Foundations (The Michie Company, 1991)
