= Kevin Chambliss =

American politician

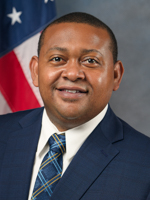

Member of the Florida House of Representatives from the 117th district
- Incumbent
- Assumed office November 3, 2020
- Preceded by: Kionne McGhee

Personal details
- Born: June 8, 1981 (age 45) Columbus, Mississippi, U.S.
- Party: Democratic
- Spouse: Leah Chambliss
- Children: 4
- Education: Jackson State University (BS)

Kevin D. Chambliss (born June 8, 1981) is an American politician serving as a member of the Florida House of Representatives from the 117th district. He assumed office on November 3, 2020.

== Early life and education ==
Chambliss was born in Columbus, Mississippi. He earned a Bachelor of Science degree in psychology from Jackson State University.

== Career ==
Chambliss worked as a field organizer for the Florida Democratic Party and as the South Dade political director for Joe Garcia's 2012 congressional campaign. He later worked as a congressional liaison for Debbie Mucarsel-Powell and Donna Shalala. Chambliss was elected to the Florida House of Representatives in November 2020. He is a member of the House State Affairs Committee.
