= Kionne McGhee =

American politician

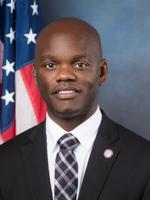

Miami-Dade County Vice Chairman of County Commissioners
- Incumbent
- Assumed office December 11, 2024
- Preceded by: Anthony Rodriguez

Member of the Miami-Dade County Commission from the 9th district
- Incumbent
- Assumed office November 17, 2020
- Preceded by: Dennis Moss

Minority Leader of the Florida House of Representatives
- In office November 19, 2018 – November 3, 2020
- Preceded by: Janet Cruz
- Succeeded by: Bobby DuBose; Evan Jenne

Member of the Florida House of Representatives from the 117th district
- In office November 6, 2012 – November 3, 2020
- Preceded by: Redistricted
- Succeeded by: Kevin Chambliss

Personal details
- Born: November 23, 1977 (age 48) Miami, Florida, U.S.
- Party: Democratic
- Spouse: Stacy McGhee
- Children: 3
- Education: Howard University (BS); Texas Southern University (JD)

Kionne L. McGhee (born November 23, 1977) is an American Democratic politician from Florida who has served as a member of the Miami-Dade County Commission since 2020. Previously, he served in the Florida House of Representatives from 2012 to 2020, representing south-central Miami-Dade County stretching from Richmond Heights to Florida City. He was the House Minority Leader for the 2018–20 legislature.

== History ==
McGhee was born in Miami and attended Howard University, where he graduated with a degree in political science in 2000, and the Thurgood Marshall School of Law of Texas Southern University, where he received a Juris doctor. After graduating, McGhee wrote "A Mere I Can is American," his memoir, and started working as an assistant state attorney in Miami-Dade County.

== Florida House of Representatives ==
In 2010, McGhee ran for the Florida House of Representatives in the 118th District, based in Miami-Dade County, in the Democratic primary against incumbent State Representative Dwight Bullard. In a closely fought election, McGhee narrowly lost to Bullard by 399 votes, receiving 47% of the vote.

Florida House districts were reconfigured in 2012 and Bullard successfully ran for the Florida State Senate, meaning that the newly created 117th District, which included most of the territory in the previous 118th District, was an open seat. McGhee opted to run there, and was opposed by Carmen Morris and Harold Ford in the Democratic primary, whom he was able to comfortably defeat, receiving 65% of the vote to Morris's 17% and Ford's 20%. He advanced to the general election, where he was elected unopposed.

In 2014, when the legislature considered a bill that would have allowed "unlicensed gun owners to carry their weapons after evacuating during an emergency," which McGhee voted against when it was considered before the House Judiciary Committee, saying that it would result in "local militias." The Miami Herald praised McGhee for his "sensibly cast" vote against the legislation, which it called "misguided." Additionally, when the legislature failed to act on legislation sponsored by State Senator Dwight Bullard and State Representative Cynthia Stafford that would have raised the state's minimum wage from $7.93 to $10.10 an hour, McGhee joined several of his colleagues in living on the minimum wage for a week, and was followed by TV cameras while he purchased food for the week at a Publix store.

McGhee was term-limited from the House in 2020, after serving four terms.

== Miami-Dade County Commission ==
In 2020, McGhee ran for the Miami-Dade County Commission seat vacated by Dennis Moss, who was term-limited. He defeated former Homestead commissioner Elvis Maldonado in the general election.

Florida House of Representatives
Preceded by Janet Cruz	Minority Leader of the Florida House of Representatives; 2018–2020	Succeeded by Bobby DuBose; Evan Jenne
