= Julio Robaina (legislator) =

American politician (born 1961)

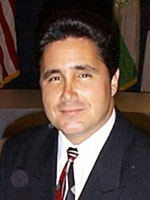

Member of the Florida House of Representatives from the 117th district
- In office November 5, 2002 – November 2, 2010
- Preceded by: Carlos Lacasa
- Succeeded by: Michael Bileca

Personal details
- Born: September 1, 1961 (age 64) Miami, Florida, U.S.
- Party: Republican
- Education: Miami Dade College (A.A.)

Julio Robaina is a state representative from Florida. He was first elected to the Florida House of Representatives in 2003 from District 117. He ran for Florida Senate from District 36, which was being vacated by Alex Diaz de la Portilla, losing to Miguel Diaz de la Portilla, Alex's brother, in the Republican primary.

Robaina was born in Miami, Florida and graduated from South Miami Senior High School and graduated with an associate degree from Miami Dade Community College in 1983. Prior to being elected to the Florida House of Representatives he served as Commissioner, Vice-Mayor, and Mayor of South Miami, Florida.
