= Larry Hawkins =

American politician (1943–2016)

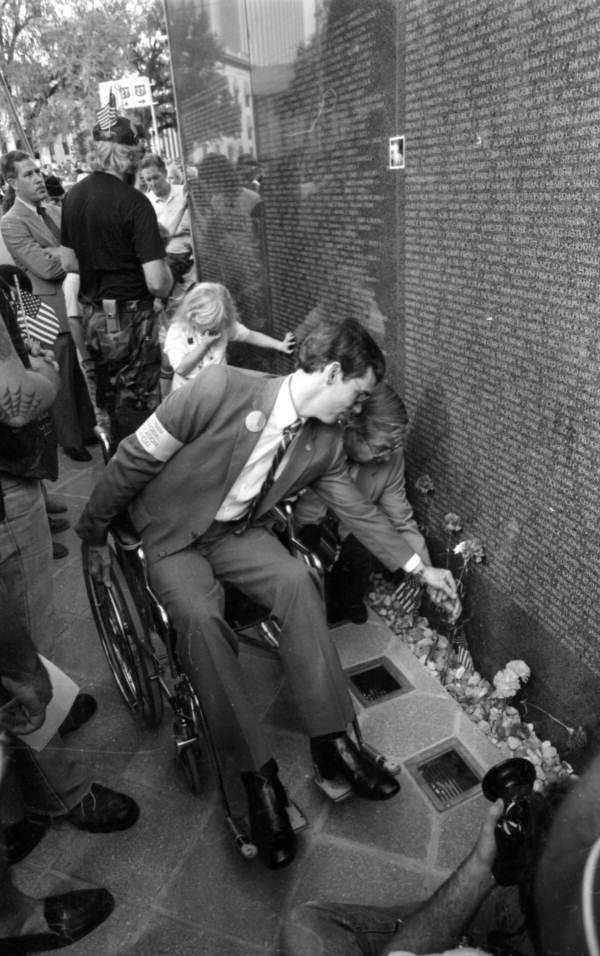
- Hawkins in 1985

Member of the Florida House of Representatives from the 119th district
- In office 1978–1986
- Preceded by: Hugo Black III
- Succeeded by: John Cosgrove

Personal details
- Born: April 21, 1943 Detroit, Michigan, U.S.
- Died: December 29, 2016 (aged 73)
- Party: Democratic
- Children: 1
- Education: Eastern Michigan University; Wayne State University Law School

Lawrence R. Hawkins (April 21, 1943 – December 29, 2016) was an American politician. He served as a Democratic member for the 119th district of the Florida House of Representatives.

Hawkins was born in Detroit, Michigan, the son of Carolyn and Roy Hawkins. He attended Eastern Michigan University, where he graduated in 1966 with a Bachelor of Science degree. Hawkins enlisted in the United States Army, where he served as a Second lieutenant from 1967. He was sent to Vietnam, where he earned the Bronze Star Medal and Purple Heart, receiving injuries which left him paraplegic. After being discharged, Hawkins attended Wayne State University Law School, where he earned a Juris Doctor degree.

In 1978, he was elected for the 119th district of the Florida House of Representatives, serving until 1986. Hawkins then served as Dade County Commissioner from 1988 to 1994. He was also on the board of the Vietnam Veterans of America. Hawkins worked with lawyer, author and politician Tom Harkin.

Hawkins died in December 2016, at the age of 73. He was buried in Arlington National Cemetery.
