= Bob Hartnett =

American politician

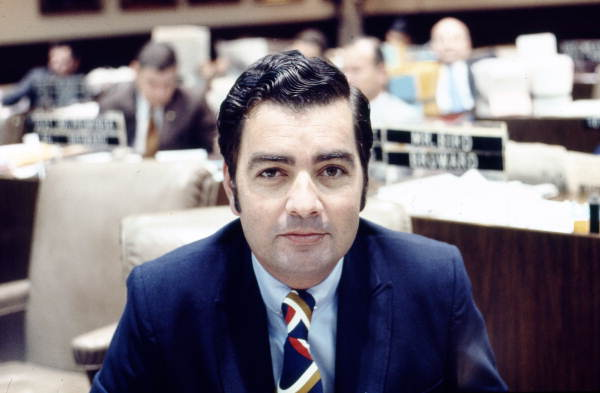
- Hartnett in 1970

Member of the Florida House of Representatives from Dade County
- In office 1966–1967

Member of the Florida House of Representatives from the 106th district
- In office 1967–1972
- Preceded by: District established
- Succeeded by: Gwen Cherry

Member of the Florida House of Representatives from the 109th district
- In office 1972–1974
- Preceded by: Jeff Gautier
- Succeeded by: Joe Gersten

Personal details
- Born: September 3, 1938 (age 88) Coral Gables, Florida, U.S.
- Party: Democratic
- Education: University of Miami

Robert C. Hartnett (born September 3, 1938) is an American politician. He served as a Democratic member for the 106th and 109th district of the Florida House of Representatives.

== Life and career ==
Hartnett was born in Coral Gables, Florida. He attended St. Leo's Preparatory School and the University of Miami.

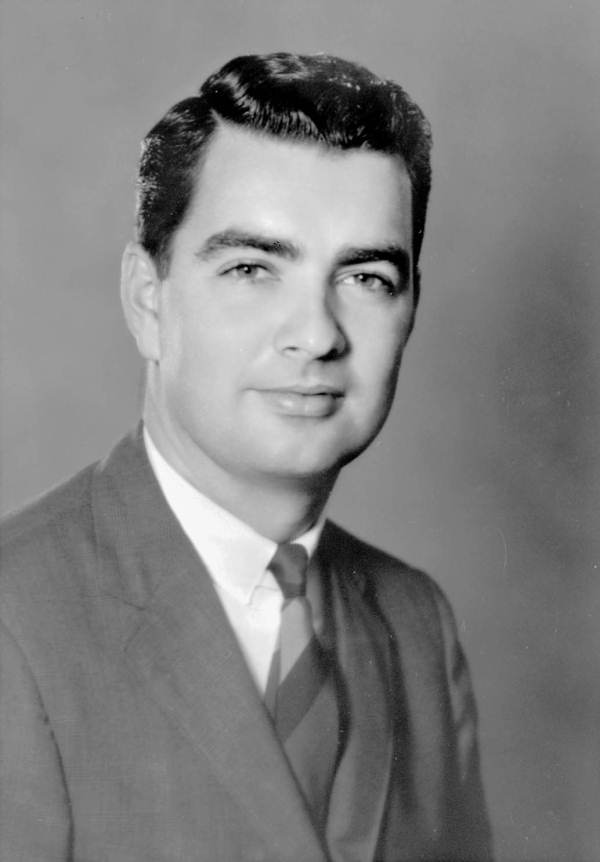
Hartnett in 1967

In 1966, Hartnett was elected to the Florida House of Representatives. The next year, he was elected as the first representative for the newly established 106th district. Hartnett served until 1972, when he was succeeded by Gwen Cherry. In the same year, he was elected to represent the 109th district, succeeding Jeff Gautier. He served until 1974, when he was succeeded by Joe Gersten.
