= Larcenia Bullard =

American politician (1947–2013)

Larcenia J. Bullard
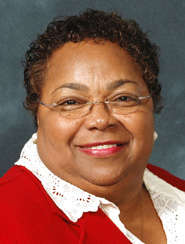

Member of the Florida Senate from the 39th district
- In office 2002–2012
- Preceded by: Rudy Garcia
- Succeeded by: Dwight Bullard

Member of the Florida House of Representatives from the 118th district
- In office 1992–2000
- Preceded by: Daryl Jones
- Succeeded by: Edward B. Bullard

Personal details
- Born: July 21, 1947 Allendale, South Carolina
- Died: March 16, 2013 (aged 65) Allendale, South Carolina
- Party: Democratic
- Spouse: Edward B. Bullard
- Children: Dwight Bullard
- Education: Antioch University (B.A.); Nova Southeastern University (M.S.)
- Profession: Housewife

Larcenia J. Bullard (July 21, 1947 – March 16, 2013) was an American politician and a Democratic member of the Florida State Senate, representing the 39th District, which included parts of Collier, Hendry, Miami-Dade, Monroe, and Palm Beach Counties, from 2002 to 2012.

Bullard was born in Allendale, South Carolina, and moved to Florida in 1980. In 1992, she was elected to the Florida House of Representatives from the 118th District, defeating Republican candidate John Minchew. She was re-elected without opposition in 1994, and in 1996, defeated Republican William "Bill" Greene. Bullard sought a final term in the House in 1998, and defeated Republican James Jones and Independent Denny Wood. She did not seek another term in 2000, and was succeeded by her husband, Edward B. Bullard.

In 2002, Bullard sought election to the Florida State Senate from the 39th District, and, in the Democratic primary, faced former State Representative Ron Saunders, former State Representative John Cosgrove, Donald Jones, and State Representative Cindy Lerner. Bullard narrowly defeated Saunders to win her party's nomination by fewer than 800 votes, and in the general election, defeated Republican nominee Evaristo Marina in a landslide. Bullard faced a tough re-election campaign in 2004, when former State Representative Saunders, who had run two years prior, and Sheila Chamberlain, ran against her in the Democratic primary. However, Bullard defeated both Saunders and Chamberlain, moving onto the general election, where she crushed her Republican opponent, Joseph Delaney. In 2008, Bullard was unopposed for re-election and won a final term. She was unable to seek re-election in 2012, and her son, Dwight Bullard, was elected to replace her.

Bullard died on March 16, 2013. She was absent from 2011 Florida Legislative Session after suffering a heart attack, returning to the Senate floor in 2012 to complete her term. She appeared on the Senate floor two weeks before her death in support of her son, Senator Dwight Bullard.
