= Ashley Gantt =

American politician

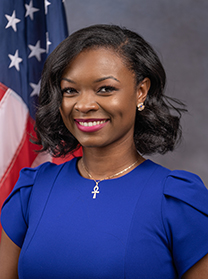

Member of the Florida Senate from the 34th district
- Incumbent
- Assumed office November 3, 2026
- Preceded by: Shevrin Jones

Member of the Florida House of Representatives from the 109th district
- In office November 8, 2022 – November 3, 2026
- Preceded by: James Bush
- Succeeded by: James Bush

Personal details
- Born: Ashley Viola Gantt; April 14, 1985 (age 41)
- Party: Democratic
- Education: University of Florida (BA); Shepard Broad College of Law; Nova Southeastern University (JD)

Ashley Viola Gantt (born c. 1984) is an American politician, attorney, and former educator serving as a member of the Florida Senate, representing the 34th district since 2026. A member of the Democratic Party, she served as a member of the Florida House of Representatives from 2022 to 2026, representing the 109th district.

== Early life and education ==
Gantt earned a B.A. in English from the University of Florida in 2007. She joined the Teach For America Mississippi Delta Corps for two years. She taught as a middle school and high school teacher for six years at Miami-Dade County Public Schools before beginning law school. Gantt completed a J.D. at the Shepard Broad College of Law in 2016.

In the 2022 Florida House of Representatives election, she criticized incumbent representative James Bush for voting with Republicans on the recent abortion ban legislation and the Florida Parental Rights in Education Act. On August 23, 2022, she won the Democratic primary for District 109. She was backed by Service Employees International Union and Ruth’s List Florida. Gantt had no opponents in the general election.

== Family ==
In 2025, her aunt Janette Gantt Palmer could not renew her driver’s license due to ID laws. Gantt helped her apply for a birth certificate through the South Carolina Department of Public Health.

== Political career ==
Democratic	Ashley Gantt	7,385	51.75%
Democratic	James Bush III	6,886	48.25%
Total votes		14,271	100%

In the 2026 elections, Gantt was elected to the 34th district of the Florida Senate, succeeding Shevrin Jones.
