= Bill Flynn (Florida politician) =

American politician (1917–1984)

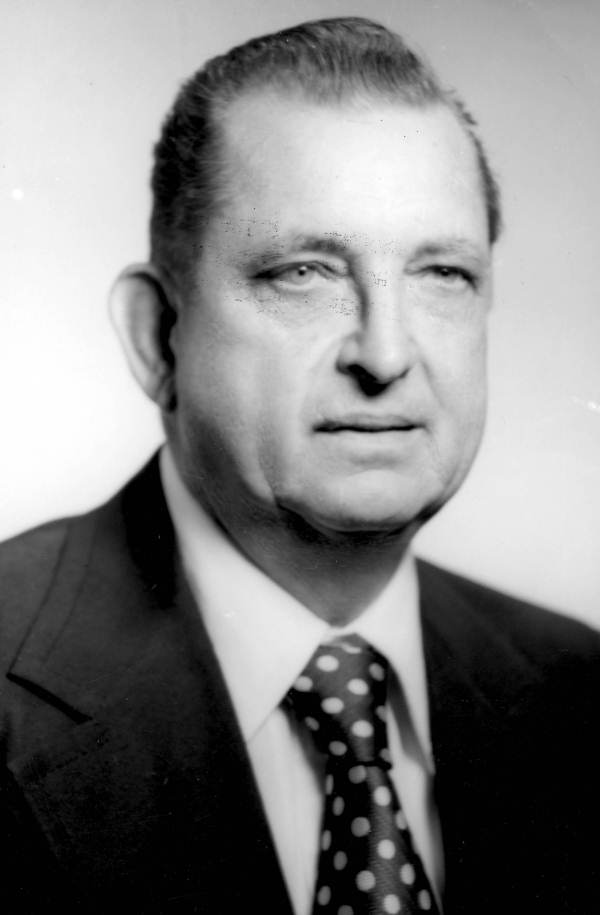
- Flynn in 1974

Member of the Florida House of Representatives from the 119th district
- In office 1974–1976
- Preceded by: Jeff Gautier
- Succeeded by: Hugo Black III

Member of the Florida House of Representatives from the 117th district
- In office 1978–1980
- Preceded by: Charles C. Papy Jr.
- Succeeded by: Scott W. McPherson

Personal details
- Born: October 17, 1917 Lutz, Florida, U.S.
- Died: April 30, 1984 (aged 66) Miami, Florida, U.S.
- Party: Democratic
- Spouse: Elizabeth Flynn
- Education: University of Miami

Bill Flynn (October 17, 1917 – April 30, 1984) was an American politician. He served as a Democratic member for the 117th and 119th district of the Florida House of Representatives.

Flynn was born in Lutz, Florida, and raised in Miami. He graduated from Miami Senior High School and studied business administration at the University of Miami. He worked as a yardmaster for the Florida East Coast Railway, and owned a barbecue restaurant called Flynn's Dixie Ribs.

In 1974, Flynn was elected for the 119th district of the Florida House of Representatives, succeeding Jeff Gautier. In 1976 he was succeeded by Hugo Black III. In 1978 he was elected for the 117th district, succeeding Charles C. Papy Jr. He was succeeded by Scott W. McPherson in 1980.

Flynn died in April 1984 in Miami, at the age of 66.
