= Hugo Black III =

American lawyer and politician (1953–2007)

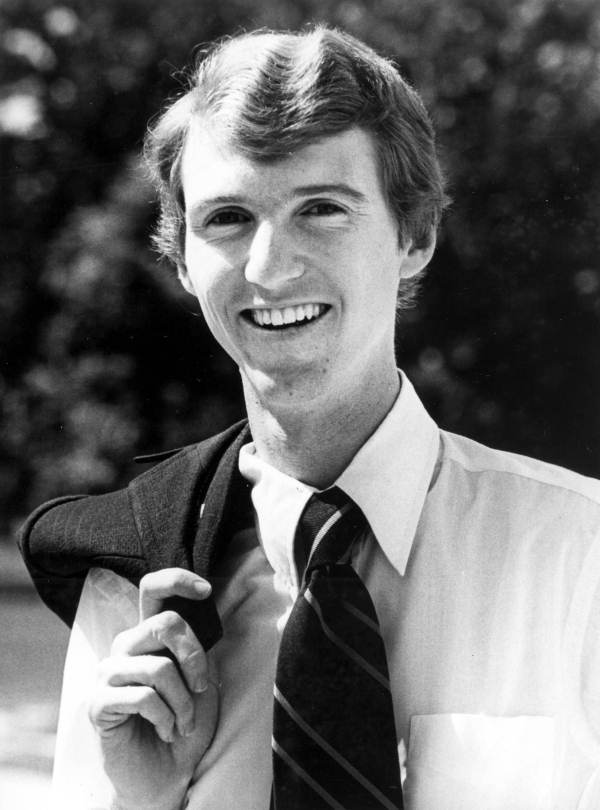

Member of the Florida House of Representatives from the 119th district
- In office 1976–1978
- Preceded by: Bill Flynn
- Succeeded by: Larry Hawkins

Personal details
- Born: Hugo Lafayette Black III; July 15, 1953 Birmingham, Alabama, U.S.
- Died: September 29, 2007 (aged 54) Coconut Grove, Florida, U.S.
- Education: Yale University (BA); Stanford University (JD)

Hugo Lafayette "Hugh" Black III (July 15, 1953 – September 29, 2007) was an American lawyer and politician.

== Life and career ==
Black was born in Birmingham, Alabama, the son of Hugo Black Jr. and Bessie Graham Hobson, and the grandson of Supreme Court Associate Justice Hugo Black.

Black graduated as valedictorian from Palmetto High School in Pinecrest, Florida in 1971. He attended Yale University, where he was his class president, and then graduated from Stanford Law School, where he was on the Stanford Law Review. Black served as a law clerk to Patrick Higginbotham of the United States Court of Appeals for the Fifth Circuit. Black was elected to the Florida House of Representatives in 1976 as a Democrat when he was 23 years old. He succeeded Bill Flynn. Black only served one term (1976–1978). He was then succeeded by Larry Hawkins.

Black worked at the law firm of Rosenfeld, Meyer & Susman as a partner from 1984 until he joined the entertainment division of Weissmann, Wolff, Bergman, Coleman & Silverman of Los Angeles in 1993. As an entertainment lawyer he represented screenwriters and actors, including Alex Hyde-White.

He returned to Miami to work at the United States Attorney's Office for the Southern District of Florida. He served as Assistant United States Attorney from 1995 until his death. As Assistant U.S. Attorney he mainly prosecuted white-collar fraud cases.

Black married Jeannine Crowell on October 16, 1996, in Pinecrest, Florida. They had no children.

Black died unexpectedly at his home in Coconut Grove Florida on September 29, 2007, at the age of 54 from gastrointestinal bleeding.
