= Juan Carlos Porras =

American politician

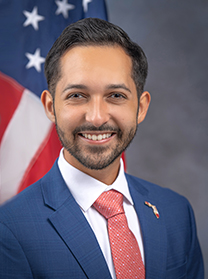

Member of the Florida House of Representatives from the 119th district
- Incumbent
- Assumed office November 8, 2022
- Preceded by: Juan Fernandez-Barquin

Personal details
- Born: July 8, 1997 (age 29) Miami, Florida, U.S.
- Party: Republican
- Education: Florida International University (BA)
- Website: Campaign website

Juan Carlos Porras (born July 8, 1997) is an American politician serving as a member of the Florida House of Representatives for the 119th district. He assumed office on November 8, 2022. He is a Republican.

== Early life and education ==
Porras was born in Miami in 1997 to Cuban immigrant parents. He earned a Bachelor of Arts degree in political science from Florida International University.

== Career ==
Porras worked in the offices of Senator Marco Rubio, then-Governor Rick Scott, and state representatives Juan Fernandez-Barquin and Spencer Roach. He was elected to the Florida House of Representatives in November 2022.
