= Carlos Lacasa =

American politician

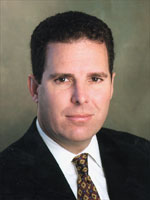

Member of the Florida House of Representatives from the 117th District
- In office November 8, 1994 – November 5, 2002
- Preceded by: Eladio Armesto-Garcia
- Succeeded by: Julio Robaina

Personal details
- Born: December 6, 1963 (age 62) Miami, Florida
- Party: Republican
- Education: University of Miami (B.A.); Shepard Broad College of Law (J.D.)

Carlos Lacasa (born December 6, 1963) is a Republican politician and attorney who served as a member of the Florida House of Representatives from the 117th District from 1994 to 2002.

== Early life and career ==
Lacasa was born in Miami, Florida. He attended the University of Miami, receiving his bachelor's degree in 1987, and then the Shepard Broad College of Law, receiving his juris doctor in 1990.

== Florida House of Representatives ==
In 1994, Lacasa challenged incumbent State Representative Eladio Armesto-Garcia for re-election in the Republican primary in the 117th district, which was based in Coral Gables. During the campaign, Armesto-Garcia faced controversy over his decision to hire his ex-girlfriend as his district office secretary, and then to fire her the day after her daughter turned eighteen, as well as whether he resided within the district. In the primary election, Armesto-Garcia placed first with 42 percent of the vote, and Lacasa placed second with 33 percent, while businessman Leo Flores won 25 percent. Because no candidate won a majority, a runoff election was held on October 4, which Lacasa narrowly won, receiving 54 percent of the vote. In the general election, Lacasa faced Democratic nominee James Bovell, an attorney. He defeated Bovell by a wide margin, winning 67 percent of the vote to Bovell's 33 percent.

In 1996, Lacasa ran for re-election, and was challenged by Flores and Ovidio Lopez-Fernandez, a Spanish-language newspaper publisher. He defeated both in a landslide, receiving 76 percent of the vote to Flores's 16 percent and Lopez-Fernandez's 8 percent. He was re-elected unopposed in the general election.

Lacasa was unopposed for re-election in 1998. In 2000, Lacasa was challenged by nonprofit executive and political consultant Ana Alliegro, the girlfriend of State Senator Alex Díaz de la Portilla, one of Lacasa's intra-party rivals, and John Robert Penland. Lacasa narrowly won the primary without need for a runoff, receiving 51 percent of the vote to Alliegro's 43 percent and Fenland's 6 percent.

== Post-legislative career ==
In 2002, Lacasa faced term limits and could not run for re-election to a fifth term. Instead, he challenged Alex Díaz de la Portilla in the Republican primary in the 36th Senate district. The race between Lacasa and Díaz de la Portilla was negative, and drew on decades of a feud between their two families. Díaz de la Portilla narrowly won re-nomination, receiving 49 percent of the vote to Lacasa's 42 percent.

Governor Jeb Bush appointed Lacasa to the Miami-Dade Expressway Authority Board in 2005, and was appointed by State House Speaker Marco Rubio to serve on the Florida Taxation and Budget Reform Commission in 2007. In 2011, Chief Financial Officer Jeff Atwater named Lacasa as the Chairman of the Board of Governors of the Citizens Property Insurance Corporation.
