= Sara Bullard =

American writer

- Born: North Carolina, US
- Occupation(s): Writer, sociological researcher
- Known for: Founding director of Teaching Tolerance

Sara Bullard is an American writer and sociological researcher focused on hate crimes, racism, and the civil rights movement. She is the founding director of Teaching Tolerance, a national project of the Southern Poverty Law Center to promote racial and cultural understanding among students. Bullard was the editor of the program's semiannual magazine. She authored the books Free at Last (1993) and Teaching Tolerance (1996).

== Early life ==
Sara Bullard was raised in North Carolina. Until 1968, her father Jack Bullard had a Raleigh-area Southern Baptist pulpit. He left his position to focus his career on improving race relations and moved the family to Charlotte. Bullard was part of the first group of students to attend desegregated Charlotte-Mecklenburg Schools, studying at Randolph Middle School. The environment was tense and bomb threats were common.

== Career ==
Bullard worked as a journalist before joining the North Carolina Humanities Council. She joined the Southern Poverty Law Center (SPLC) in 1987 where she published the KlanWatch report and researched extremism. Bullard and SPLC director Morris Dees found that half of the hate crimes in the U.S. involved perpetrators under the age of 21. To combat this, in 1991, Bullard founded the SPLC's Teaching Tolerance division to develop school curricula and publish Teaching Tolerance, a semiannual magazine aimed at educators. The division provides instructional materials to schoolteachers to promote racial and cultural understanding among students.

Bullard authored Free at Last (1993), a juvenile nonfiction book about the civil rights movement. It includes a chronology of prominent and unsung martyrs who died in their efforts. She wrote Teaching Tolerance (1996), a book aimed at parents and teachers to help explore their personal biases to enable the rearing of tolerant and empathetic children. As of 1996, Bullard has performed sociological research on hate and intolerance for a decade with the SPLC. Based on her research and federal statistics, she believes that "intolerance is the seed of a growing crisis" and predicts that racism and xenophobia is spreading.

== Selected works ==
- Bullard, Sara (1993). Free At Last: A History of the Civil Rights Movement and Those Who Died in the Struggle. New York: Oxford University Press. ISBN 978-0-19-508381-1. OCLC 26930766.
- Bullard, Sara (1996). Teaching Tolerance: Raising Open-minded, Empathetic Children. New York: Doubleday. ISBN 978-0-385-47264-7. OCLC 33101563.
