= Juan C. Zapata =

American politician

Member of the Miami-Dade County Commission from the 11th District
- In office 2012–2016
- Preceded by: Joe Martinez
- Succeeded by: Joe Martinez

Member of the Florida House of Representatives from the 119th district
- In office 2002–2010
- Preceded by: Cindy Lerner
- Succeeded by: Frank Artiles

Personal details
- Born: December 9, 1966 (age 59) Medellin, Colombia
- Party: Republican
- Profession: Businessman, Consultant

Juan Carlos Zapata (born December 9, 1966) is an American businessman, politician and the owner of Zapata Consulting. Prior to the company's inception, Zapata was involved in importing seafood, real estate and other business ventures, as well as non-profit management.

In 2002, he became the first Colombian American elected to serve in the Florida Legislature and was subsequently re-elected three times to Florida House of Representatives. He served as Chairman of the Miami-Dade Delegation from 2007 to 2010 and was appointed to Governor Rick Scott's Health and Human Services Transition Team in 2010.

Following his time in the State Legislature, Zapata was elected as a County Commissioner in 2012 and became the first Colombian-American to represent Miami-Dade County residents on the Miami-Dade County Board of Commissioners. As a Commissioner, Zapata served as the Chair of the Strategic Planning & Government Operations Committee and the Value Adjustment Board. Zapata was also a member of the Metropolitan Services Committee, the Unincorporated Municipal Service Area Committee, and the Metropolitan Planning Organization.

Zapata has served on the board for several national organizations and was the past Chair of the National Association of Latino Elected and Appointed Officials (NALEO) and the National Council of State Legislators (NCSL) Labor and Economic Development Committee.

Zapata attended Florida International University, where he received a bachelor's degree in Finance and International Business. Zapata also holds a master's degree in Public Administration from Harvard University's Kennedy School of Government. Zapata currently resides in Miami, Florida.
