= Florida's 119th House of Representatives district =

American legislative district

Florida's 119th State House of Representatives district
Representative
Juan Carlos Porras; R–West Kendall
- Registration: 51.0% Democratic; 47.6% Republican; 1.4% No party preference
- Demographics: 7.5% White; 5.4% Black; 85.2% Hispanic; 3.2% Asian; 0.8% Native American; 0.1% Hawaiian/Pacific Islander
- Population (2020) • Voting age: 183,655; 18

Florida's 119th House district elects one member of the Florida House of Representatives. The district is represented by Juan Carlos Porras. The district covers part of Miami-Dade County.

== Members ==
Representative	Party	Years of service	Hometown	Notes
Granville Crabtree	Republican	1967 – 1972		District created 1967
Jeff Gautier	Democratic	1972–1974		
Bill Flynn	Democratic	1974–1976		
Hugo Black III	Democratic	1976 – 1978		
Larry Hawkins	Democratic	1978 – 1986		
John Cosgrove	Democratic	1986 – 2000		
Cindy Lerner	Democratic	2000 – 2002		
Juan C. Zapata	Republican	2002 – 2010		
Frank Artiles	Republican	2010 – 2012		
Jeanette Nuñez	Republican	2012 – November 6, 2018		Elected Lieutenant Governor
Juan Fernandez-Barquin	Republican	November 6, 2018 – November 8, 2022	Kendale Lakes	Redistricted into District 118. Won landslide victories in redistricting Primary and General Elections of 2022
Juan Carlos Porras	Republican	November 8, 2022 – Present	West Kendall	Incumbent Juan Fernandez-Barquin was redistricted into District 118
