= Becker & Poliakoff, P.A. =

American law firm

- Industry: Legal services
- Founded: 1973
- Founders: Alan S. Becker; Gary A. Poliakoff
- Headquarters: Fort Lauderdale, Florida, United States
- Key people: Gary C. Rosen (Managing Shareholder)
- Services: Corporate law, Litigation, Real Estate law, Construction law, Government law and Lobbying, Community Association representation
- Website: beckerlawyers.com

Becker & Poliakoff, P.A., also known as Becker, is an American, multi-practice commercial law firm and has more than 170 attorneys, lobbyists, and other professionals in Florida, New York, New Jersey, Pennsylvania, Washington D.C., and Italy, with headquarters in Fort Lauderdale, Florida. Secretary of State Marco Rubio worked at Becker & Poliakoff prior to entering the political arena.

== Background ==
Becker & Poliakoff, P.A. was established in 1973 by lawyers Alan S. Becker and Gary A. Poliakoff in Miami, Florida. They both graduated from University of Miami Law School in 1969. It was initially a law firm focused on community association law. Later, it transitioned into a multi-practice law firm.

Becker & Poliakoff expanded to include construction law, real estate, corporate, business litigation, government law and lobbying, employment discrimination, land use and zoning, class actions, and appeals. It represents publicly traded corporations, local, state, and federal government entities, financial institutions, insurance companies, community associations, developers, contractors, small businesses, entrepreneurs, and individuals. The firm contributed to shaping Florida’s condominium and homeowners’ association law, and the community association practice group’s core practice areas include governance, construction law, corporate law, collections and foreclosure, disaster recovery, civil trial, and appellate.

In 1992, Becker and Poliakoff was one of nine U.S. law firms authorized by the Beijing government to open an office in Guangzhou, adjacent to Hong Kong. Becker & Poliakoff, s.r.o., formed in 1997, is a member of an international network of independent law firms.

In 2003, Becker and Poliakoff handled the third-largest bankruptcy in U.S. history involving CNO Financial Group (formerly Conseco Finance Corp. and Conseco Finance Servicing Corp.)

Secretary of State Marco Rubio formerly worked as a land use and zoning attorney in Becker’s Miami office in 2001, and wrote about Becker in his book, An American Son: A Memoir.

== Notable Cases ==
In Raiser-DC, LLC v. B&L Service, Inc. and Broward County, Florida, Becker obtained a ruling by the Fourth District Court of Appeal which held that Broward County was required to disclose information about Uber’s operations at the Fort Lauderdale-Hollywood International Airport, despite Uber’s claims that the records were trade secret information and exempt from Florida’s Public Records Act.

In Grandview At Riverwalk Port Imperial Condominium Association, Inc. v. K. Hovnanian At Port Imperial Urban Renewal II, LLC., Becker obtained a $3 million jury verdict against a high-rise residential developer for breach of warranty claims, that was trebled to $9 million under the New Jersey Consumer Fraud Act.

In Soloviev v. Ross School, State of New York Appellate Division 2d. Dep’t(2024), Becker represented the appellant to recover damages related to breach of contract, unjust enrichment, negligent hiring, retention, supervision, and direction, and negligent infliction of emotional distress, The private school moved to dismiss the complaint which was granted in December 2021. The plaintiffs appealed the dismissal and on May 1, 2024, the Appellate Division, Second Department reversed the lower court’s determination and reinstated the causes of action relating to gross negligence including negligent hiring, retention, supervision and direction, and negligent infliction of emotional distress.

Shareholder Patrick C. Howell represented the respondent and shareholders Steven B. Lesser and Sanjay Kurian appeared as Amicus Curiae, in the Florida Supreme Court case Maronda Homes, Inc. of Florida v. Lakeview Reserve Homeowners Association, Inc., 127 So.3d 1258 (Fla. 2013), in which the Court held that implied warranties extend to offsite improvements essential to habitability and that a statute could not be applied retroactively to eliminate the association’s accrued rights.

In DK Arena, Inc. v. E.B. Acquisitions I, LLC., Becker prevailed on appeal on behalf of a real estate developer in a breach of contract suit against famed boxing promoter Don King. The case established the precedent that detrimental reliance upon verbal representations in the context of a real estate transaction can, under certain circumstances, overcome the statute of frauds.

In Lindsey Adelman Studio, LLC vs. Zora Lighting et.al, 1:19 cv-04715 (SDNY) (March 27, 2020), shareholders Kevin Markow and Gary Rosen represented lighting and interior designer Lindsey Adelman Studio against overseas counterfeiters for trademark infringement and related claims. The Court granted freeze orders relying on claims of trademark infringement, trade dress, and unfair competition to protect Adelman’s lighting designs from being infringed.

Hillsboro Light Towers, Inc. v. Sherrill, 474 So.2d 1219 (Fla. 4d DCA 1985), in which the court held that an amendment shifting maintenance responsibilities from the association to unit owners may be valid if approved by a supermajority.

Munder v. Circle One Condo, Inc., 596 So. 2d 144 (Fla 4d DCA 1992), in which the court held that the developer was liable for breaching its fiduciary duty to maintain insurance, but the individual president/sole stockholder could not be held personally liable.

Florida Discount Properties, Inc. v. Windemere Condo, Inc., 786 So 2d 1271 (Fla. 4d DCA 2001), in which the court held that remedies for breach of fiduciary duty can include forcing usurpers to disgorge improperly acquired corporate opportunities.

Becker represented the petitioner in the Florida Supreme Court case Moransais v. Heathman, 744 So. 2d 973 (Fla. 1999) in which the Court held that a professional negligence claim can be brought against a professional, such as an engineer, because they owed a duty to their client independent of their contractual relationship.

Kaufman v. Shere, 347 So.2d 627 (Fla. 3d DCA 1977), in which the court held that a statute could not be applied retroactively, but because the contract incorporated future changes to the law, the statute prevented further rent increases after it took effect.

Woodside Village Condo. Ass’n, Inc. v. Jahren, 806 So.2d 452 (Fla. 2002), in which the court held that unit owners who bought before a declaration amendment restricting leasing were nevertheless bound because they took title subject to the condominium’s amendment process. .

== Recognition ==
Becker and Poliakoff has been recognized by Chambers and Partners at the top of its field in Construction Law & Litigation, as well as also highly ranked in General Commercial Litigation, New Jersey Construction, and Construction Nationwide.

Becker also ranks as a national first-tier law firm for its Construction Law, Construction Litigation, and Banking and Finance Litigation practice areas in the Best Lawyers “Best Law Firms” guide and is also nationally ranked in five other practice areas: Banking and Finance Law, Commercial Litigation, Corporate Law, Real Estate Law, and Real Estate Litigation.

Named to U.S. News & World Report’s list of The Best Companies to Work For Among U.S. Law Firms every year since the inaugural list.

Ranked by the South Florida Business Journal as a Top 50 Corporate Philanthropist in South Florida.

Since 2021, Becker has consistently earned national recognition in The Top 50 Construction Law Firms by Construction Executive Magazine.

Awarded Diamond Level Readers’ Choice Award from the Florida Community Association Journal (FLCAJ).

Managing Shareholder Gary C. Rosen and shareholder Yolanda Cash Jackson have been named to Florida Trend’s prestigious Florida 500 list of the state’s most influential executives every year since 2018 and 2021, respectively.

Managing Shareholder Gary C. Rosen and firm founder, Alan S. Becker, were recognized as one of the South Florida Business Journal’s “Ultimate CEOs.” This “best of the best” honor is reserved for the 15 top executives in Miami-Dade, Broward, and Palm Beach Counties and recognizes business acumen, leadership, and community involvement.

Managing Shareholder Gary C. Rosen was named to Florida Trend’s Notable Managing Partners list in 2025, 2024, and 2023.

Shareholder Yolanda Cash-Jackson played a pivotal role in securing Florida’s historic selection of Mary McLeod Bethune as the first African American to represent a state in the National Statuary Hall Collection at the U.S. Capitol.
