= Dwight Bullard =

American politician

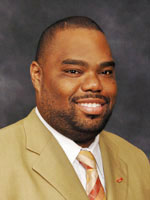

Member of the Florida Senate from the 39th district
- In office November 6, 2012 – November 8, 2016
- Preceded by: Larcenia Bullard
- Succeeded by: Redistricted

Member of the Florida House of Representatives from the 118th district
- In office November 4, 2008 – November 6, 2012
- Preceded by: Edward B. Bullard
- Succeeded by: Frank Artiles

Personal details
- Born: February 4, 1977 (age 49) Philadelphia, Pennsylvania
- Party: Democratic
- Education: Florida A&M University (B.S.)
- Profession: Teacher

Dwight M. Bullard (born February 4, 1977) is a Democratic politician and teacher from Florida. He served one term in the Florida State Senate, representing parts of South Florida from 2012 to 2016, and before that served two terms in the Florida House of Representatives, representing a district in southern Miami-Dade County from 2008 until his election to the Senate.

== Early life ==
Bullard was born in Philadelphia, Pennsylvania and moved to Florida in 1981; his father, Edward B. Bullard, served in the Florida House of Representatives from 2000 to 2008, and his mother Larcenia Bullard, served in the House from 1992 to 2000 and in the Florida State Senate from 2002 to 2012. He attended Florida A&M University, graduating with a degree in history education in 1999.

Since 2000, Bullard has taught social studies at Coral Reef Senior High School in Richmond Heights.

Following his tenure in the Florida Senate, Bullard began working for New Florida Majority which later became Florida Rising. He currently serves as Senior Political Advisor

== Political Career ==
=== Florida House of Representatives ===
In 2008, when his father was term-limited from the 118th District in the House, Bullard ran to succeed him. Bullard emerged victorious from a crowded Democratic primary and won the general election uncontested. In 2010, he was challenged in the primary by Kionne L. McGhee, and won by less than 400 votes. He won the general election in a landslide against his Republican opponent, Charlie Lopez.

=== Florida Senate ===
Florida State Senate districts were redrawn in 2012, and the 39th District, in which his mother could not seek another term due to term limits, was reconfigured, with the Palm Beach County sections removed and more sections from Miami-Dade County added. Bullard ran to succeed his mother, and faced Ron Saunders, the Minority Leader of the Florida House of Representatives; former State Representative James Bush; JJ Johnson; and Sal Gutierrez in the primary. The Miami Herald, which felt that more representation for the Florida Keys was necessary in the legislature, endorsed Saunders. However, Bullard narrowly won the primary by 1,500 votes and 35% of the vote, with Saunders and Bush in a close second and third. In the general election, Representative Bullard faced Scott Hopes, the CEO of a health technology firm, and won the endorsement of the Herald, which praised his "push for education reforms." In the end, Bullard defeated Hopes.

While serving in the Senate, Bullard sponsored legislation aimed at preventing cyberbullying, which allows schools to "discipline a student for cyberbullying if the student uses a computer, computer system, or computer network owned by a school." He criticized efforts by the legislature to reduce funding for Florida Virtual School while simultaneously allowing private companies to offer virtual education, noting, "We spend all of this money, time and energy to beef up our own virtual program, Florida Virtual School, and all of a sudden, we are cutting them and allowing outside providers nationwide to come in and take a chunk of the pot of money."

After court-ordered redistricting, Bullard found himself drawn into a more competitive senate district in 2016, based around Kendall in southern Miami-Dade. He was defeated by Republican State Representative Frank Artiles in the general election, 51 to 41%.

=== Controversies ===
State Senator Bullard, on a trip with Black Lives Matter touring the Middle East, was photographed with a member of the Popular Front for the Liberation of Palestine, an organization listed on the State Department's list of designated terrorist organizations. Those images were shared on social media by the group that coordinated Bullard's trip. Bullard said that he did not know until after the West Bank trip that its tour guide, Mahmoud Jeddah, was affiliated with the Popular Front for the Liberation of Palestine. However, during the same trip Didier Ortiz, a Green Party candidate for the Fort Lauderdale City Council, posted on Instagram a photo of Jeddah and noted his PFLP affiliation. (Ortiz also said in another Instagram posting from the trip, from a checkpoint in Hebron, that “Zionism must be eradicated.”) During his visit, Bullard also met with a co-founder of the BDS movement Omar Barghouti.

In 2016, Florida passed a bill to prevent the state from doing business with companies participating in boycotts of Israel. Similar anti-BDS bills have also passed in a dozen other states across the country. State Senator Dwight Bullard voted against the measure twice in the Governmental Oversight and Accountability Committee, the only nay-voting Senator. However the Bill passed through its committees and was subsequently passed by the Florida Senate in the 2016 session, where Bullard changed his vote to yes. Bullard initially opposed the anti-BDS legislation because he viewed it as a violation of free speech that he said “screams un-American.” Bullard told The Electronic Intifada he was ultimately “bullied” into voting for the law. “It was the first time I felt pressured to vote in a particular way,” he recounted, adding, “there are probably three or four votes that I’ve taken in my tenure in the legislature that I’m very uncomfortable with having taken.” The anti-BDS vote “is easily in the top three,” he said.

The Florida Elections Commission (FEC) fined Bullard $2,000 for two counts of filing incomplete reports in 2013 and 2014 after the Division of Elections sent him at least six letters asking him to update his reports. Bullard's reports claimed he raised no money for his re-election campaign and he filed the form without a signature. The commission concluded that his actions were a "willful violation" and unanimously agreed to assess the fines. In May, the commission also fined Bullard $5,000 for five violations from 2013 to 2015 for also filing incomplete elections paperwork. Bullard had been charged with failing to fix several incomplete reports — even after being told how to do so according to the commissioner's staff. Because Bullard knew of the problem and failed to act, he was found in “willful violation” of the law and fined $1,000 for each of five reports from 2013 to 2015. Bullard was unavailable for comment at the time of the investigation due to "out of country travel" according to the senator's staff. Bullard, who serves as his own campaign treasurer, stated to the Miami Herald, "It has happened to me in the past. It's unfortunate. It's painful...They definitely sent notices out but, between session, the school year and campaigning, my priorities are focused on other things and I missed the deadlines."
