= James Bush (politician) =

American politician

James Bush III
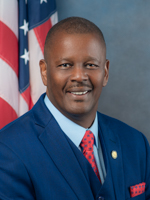

Member of the Florida House of Representatives from the 109th district
- Incumbent
- Assumed office November 3, 2026
- Preceded by: Ashley Gantt
- In office November 6, 2018 – November 8, 2022
- Preceded by: Cynthia Stafford
- Succeeded by: Ashley Gantt
- In office November 4, 2008 – November 2, 2010
- Preceded by: Dorothy Bendross-Mindingall
- Succeeded by: Cynthia Stafford
- In office November 3, 1992 – November 7, 2000
- Preceded by: Luis E. Rojas
- Succeeded by: Dorothy Bendross-Mindingall

Personal details
- Born: February 13, 1955 (age 71)
- Party: Democratic
- Spouse: Bernadine Bush
- Education: Bethune-Cookman College, Nova Southeastern University
- Profession: Teacher

James Drew Bush III (born February 13, 1955) is a Miami, Florida teacher and Democratic politician who served as the representative for Florida's 109th House of Representatives district. He previously represented the same district from 1992 to 2000 and from 2008 to 2010.

== Early life and education ==
Bush was born in Panama City, Florida on February 13, 1955. His wife, Bernadine Bush is from Buffalo, New York. He graduated from Miami Northwestern Senior High School in 1974. Bush earned his Bachelor of Science degree from Bethune-Cookman College in 1979 and his Master of Science in Educational Administration and Supervision from Nova Southeastern University in 1984.

== Political career ==
Bush made an unsuccessful bid for Florida Commissioner of Education in 2000. In 2010, he ran for Congress in Florida's 17th congressional district, losing to state senator Frederica Wilson. In 2004, he earned his D.Min-Christian Ed. at Smith Chapel Bible College. Since returning to the Florida House of Representatives, Bush garnered a conservative record, voting for controversial bills put forward by Ron DeSantis like the "Don't Say Gay" bill. Earning the ire of many in Tallahassee and the Democratic Party's liberal and progressive wings, Bush lost reelection in 2022 to Ashley Gantt and since neither candidate faced a general election opponent, the primary was tantamount to victory.

== See also ==
- 2010 United States House of Representatives elections in Florida
