= Scott W. McPherson =

American politician (born 1955)

Member of the Florida House of Representatives from the 117th district
- In office 1980–1982
- Preceded by: Bill Flynn
- Succeeded by: C. Thomas Gallagher III

Personal details
- Born: September 7, 1955 (age 71) Jacksonville, Florida, U.S.
- Party: Republican
- Education: Indian River Community College

Scott W. McPherson (born September 7, 1955) is an American politician. He served as a Republican member for the 117th district of the Florida House of Representatives.

== Life and career ==
McPherson was born in Jacksonville, Florida. He attended Indian River Community College.

In 1980, McPherson was elected to represent the 117th district of the Florida House of Representatives, succeeding Bill Flynn. He served until 1982, when he was succeeded by C. Thomas Gallagher III.
