= Jim K. Tillman =

American politician

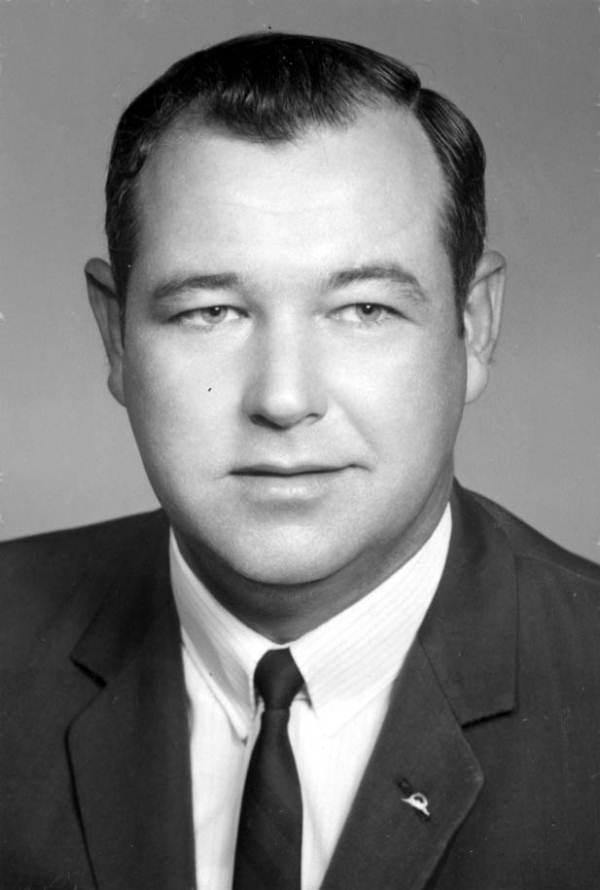

Florida House of Representatives Minority Whip
- In office 1970–1972

Member of the Florida House of Representatives from the 75th, 117th district
- In office 1967–1974

Florida House of Representatives Minority Leader
- In office 1972

Personal details
- Born: James King Tillman; June 23, 1935 Adel, Georgia, U.S.
- Died: July 4, 2012 (aged 77) Tallahassee, Florida, U.S.
- Party: Republican
- Spouse: Mary Chandler Wells
- Children: James McGregor, John Daniel, Teresa Lee, Jimi Lynn

James King Tillman (June 23, 1935 – July 4, 2012) was a Florida state legislator, rancher and criminologist.

Tillman was born in Georgia in 1935 and moved to Florida the year after. He attended Florida State University and earned a Bachelor of Science degree in 1961. Prior to his election to the House of Representatives, he served as Deputy Sheriff for Leon County, Florida, from 1959 to 1961 and as a counselor for a juvenile court in Sarasota County. Tillman was elected to the Florida House of Representatives for Sarasota County in 1967 and served until 1974. During those years, he was Minority Whip from 1970 to 1972 and Minority Leader in 1972.

He was married to Mary Chandler Wells of Clearwater, Florida, and has four children, James, John, Teresa and Jimi. He was associated with the Methodist church.

Jim K. Tillman died on July 4, 2012, after a long illness.
