= Cindy Lerner =

American politician (born 1952)

Member of the Florida House of Representatives from the 119th district
- In office 2000–2002
- Preceded by: John Cosgrove
- Succeeded by: Juan C. Zapata

Mayor of Pinecrest, Florida
- In office 2008–2016
- Preceded by: Gary C. Matzner
- Succeeded by: Joseph M. Corradino

Personal details
- Born: August 21, 1952 (age 74) Norfolk, Virginia, U.S.
- Party: Democratic
- Children: 3
- Education: Newcomb College of Tulane University; Emory University School of Law

Cindy Lerner (born August 21, 1952) is an American politician. She served as a Democratic member for the 119th district of the Florida House of Representatives.

Lerner was born in Norfolk, Virginia, and moved to Florida in 1960. She attended Newcomb College of Tulane University, earning her bachelor's degree in 1974. She then attended Emory University School of Law, where she earned her Juris Doctor degree in 1978. In 2000, Lerner won the election for the 119th district of the Florida House of Representatives. She succeeded John Cosgrove. In 2002, Lerner was succeeded by Juan C. Zapata for the 119th district. She later served as Mayor of the Village of Pinecrest.

Lerner wrote a column for The Huffington Post in 2012.

In 2020, attempting to succeed termed-out County Commissioner Xavier Suarez, Lerner challeneged former schoolboard member Raquel Regalado. Both women advanced to the run-off as neither won the outright majority. Regalado won a close victory in 2020. Lerner mounted a rematch in 2024 against now incumbent commissioner Regalado. The race was marked by increasing negative mailers with Lerner accusing Regalado of corruption, and retaliatory mailers that highlighted Lerner's behavior as Mayor of Pinecrest and her temper during community meetings. Similar accusations against Lerner were made during the first race for County Commission. Similar to the 2020 race, neither woman won the outright 50% to win and needed a run-off. This time Regalado won reelection with 56%.
