= Alan S. Becker =

American politician and lawyer (1946–2020)

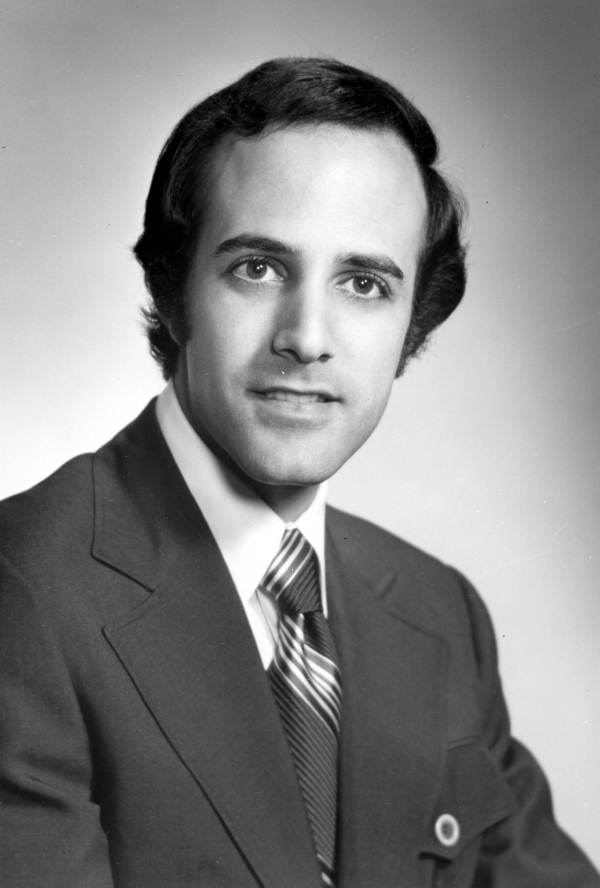
- Becker in 1972

Member of the Florida House of Representatives from the 103rd district
- In office November 7, 1972 – November 7, 1978
- Preceded by: Carl Singleton
- Succeeded by: Ron Silver

Personal details
- Born: February 9, 1946 Brooklyn, New York, U.S.
- Died: July 4, 2020 (aged 74) Southwest Ranches, Florida, U.S.
- Party: Democratic
- Education: Brooklyn College, University of Miami School of Law

Alan S. Becker (February 9, 1946 – July 4, 2020) was an American lawyer, politician, educator, and writer.

== Early life ==
Becker was born in Brooklyn, in New York City. He went to Brooklyn College. Becker received his Juris Doctor degree from University of Miami School of Law and was admitted to the Florida bar in 1969. He worked in the office of the Florida Attorney General and as an assistant public defender from 1969 to 1972.

== Career ==
=== Politics ===
At 26, Mr. Becker, a Democrat, became the youngest person at the time to be elected to the Florida House of Representatives, where he served three terms from 1972 to 1978. During his tenure in the Legislature and on the Florida Law Revision Council (1975–1976), he played a leading role in authoring or sponsoring several major laws, including the Condomuinum Act and the Evidence Code.

=== Legal ===
Becker met his future business partner, Gary Poliakoff, while both attended the University of Miami Law School. Together, in 1973, they formed one of South Florida's largest law firms, Becker & Poliakoff, which would eventually open offices in New York, New Jersey, and Washington, DC. Becker served as the firm's managing partner from 2008 to 2012.

=== Economic Development ===
Becker was a member of the Board of Directors of Enterprise Florida, the official economic development organization for the State of Florida, for 20 years, and served as vice-chair (2015–2017). He also served as the Chair of the Beacon Council (2011–12), Miami-Dade County's economic development agency, and on the Board of Directors of Florida Atlantic University Foundation. In 2012, he was awarded the Governor's Business Ambassador Medallion for his contributions to economic development in Florida. Mr. Becker was also the Honorary Consul of the Czech Republic (1992–2016).

=== Educator and Author ===
Becker taught the "Business of Law" at the University of Miami Law School, and "Leadership" at Keiser University. He was also the author of two books. The first, of which he was co-author, was Florida Rules of Evidence. He also wrote, There's Always Room at the Top: The 8 Secrets of the Super Successful, in which he provides life lessons from interviews with super-successful people in various fields, including politics, the arts, and corporate America.

== Recognition ==
Becker was regularly named to Florida Trend magazine's “Legal Elite”, South Florida's “Power Elite” by South Florida CEO Magazine, and was named by his peers to be included in the 2006 "Best Lawyers in America and was awarded the Global Achievement Award by the Florida Council of International Development. He was also awarded the Daily Business Review Lifetime Achievement Award (for legal profession) (2015).
