= Edward B. Bullard =

American politician (born 1943)

Edward B. "Ed" Bullard (born November 28, 1943) is a Bahamian-born American former politician and educator.

Born in Nassau, Bahamas, Edward Bullard served in the United States Army from 1966 to 1969. He received a Bachelor of Science degree in Sociology with a minor in Criminology in 1972 from Florida A&M University. He also received his master's degree in Education Administration (Grades 7–12) in 1976 from Florida A&M University as well. A master's degree Education Administration (K-12) was earned from Nova Southeastern University in 1977. He retired from the Miami-Dade School system as an administrator. Bullard served eight years from 2000 to 2008 in the Florida House of Representatives. His wife, Larcenia, and their son, Dwight Bullard, also served in the Florida State Legislature.
