= Dorothy Bendross-Mindingall =

American politician

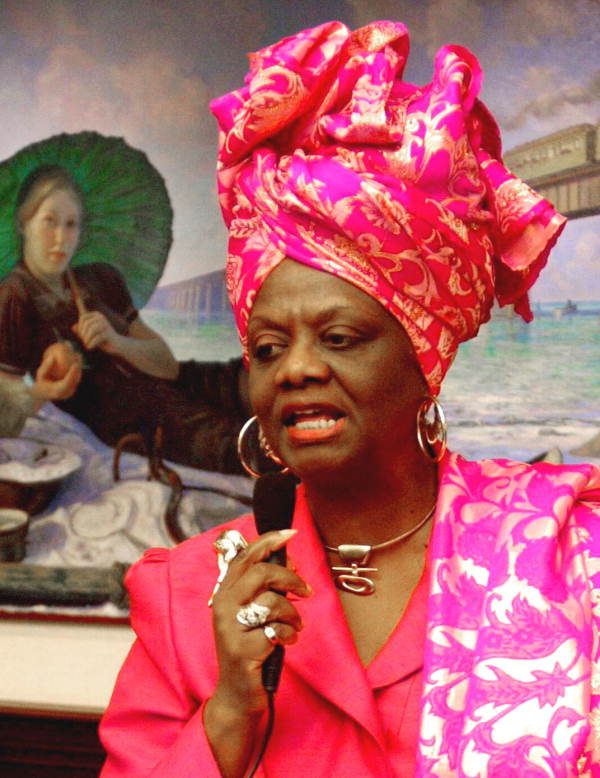
Dorothy Bendross-Mindingall in 2004.

Dorothy Bendross-Mindingall (born July 22, 1942, in Luverne, Alabama) is a former Democratic member of the Florida House of Representatives, representing the 109th district. She was elected to the House in 2000 and reelected in 2002, 2004, and 2006. Term limits forced her to leave the legislature in 2009; she was replaced by James Bush III. Dr. Bendross-Mindingall currently serves on the Miami-Dade county school board for district 2.
