= Florida's 109th House of Representatives district =

Florida district

Florida's 109th State House of Representatives district
Representative
Ashley Gantt; D–Miami

Florida's 109th House of Representatives district elects one member of the Florida House of Representatives. It contains parts of Miami-Dade County.

== Members ==
- Luis E. Rojas (until 1992)
- James Bush (1992–2000)
- Dorothy Bendross-Mindingall (2000–2008)
- James Bush (2008–2010)
- Cynthia Stafford (2010–2018)
- James Bush (2018–2022)
- Ashley Gantt (since 2022)
