= John Cosgrove (Florida politician) =

American politician (1949–2006)

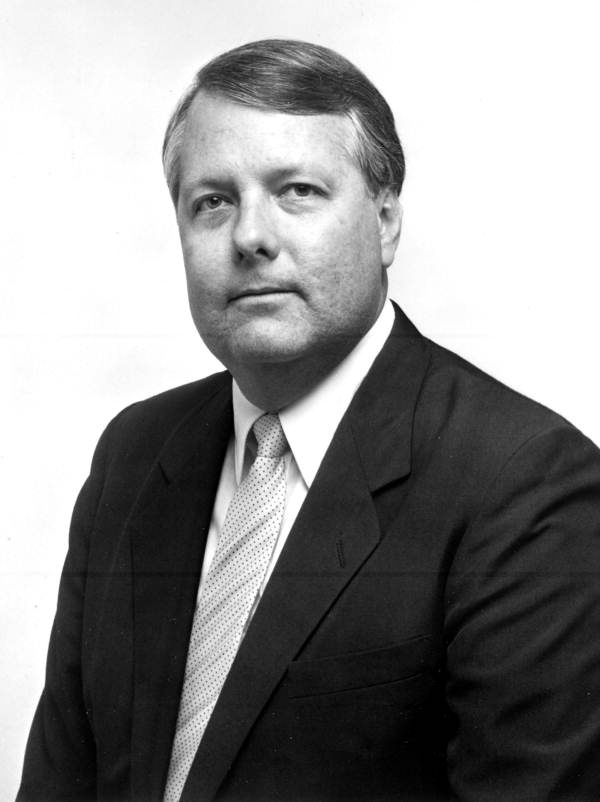

Member of the Florida House of Representatives from the 119th district
- In office 1986–2000
- Preceded by: Larry Hawkins
- Succeeded by: Cindy Lerner

Personal details
- Born: July 1, 1949 Coral Gables, Florida, US
- Died: April 19, 2006 (aged 56) Zimbabwe
- Party: Democratic
- Spouse: Bernadine Cosgrove
- Profession: Attorney

John Francis Cosgrove (July 1, 1949 – April 19, 2006) was an American politician who served in the Florida state legislature.

Cosgrove previously served as a Representative in the House of Representatives of the U.S. state of Florida. In January 2006, he was elected the first mayor of the newly incorporated town of Cutler Bay, Florida. While vacationing in Zimbabwe, Cosgrove underwent an emergency appendectomy at a medical facility in South Africa. He died on April 19, 2006.

In 2007, a portion of the Homestead Extension of Florida's Turnpike between Southwest 152nd and 216th streets in Palmetto Bay and Cutler Bay was designated by the Florida legislature as the "John F. Cosgrove Highway."

== Education ==
Cosgrove received his bachelor's degree in journalism from the University of Florida in 1972. He received his law degree from the Cumberland School of Law in 1975.

As an undergraduate at Florida, he became a brother of Phi Kappa Tau fraternity and was later its National President and legal counsel.

Party political offices
Preceded by Bill Nelson	Democratic nominee for Treasurer, Insurance Commissioner, and Fire Marshal of Florida; 2000	Succeeded by Office Abolished
