= Chuck Nergard =

American politician

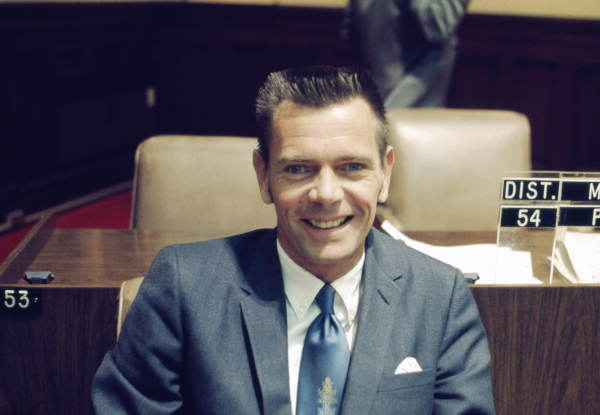

Member of the Florida House of Representatives
- In office March 28, 1967 – November 2, 1976
- Preceded by: Constituency established
- Succeeded by: Dale Cassens
- Constituency: 75th district (1967–1972); 76th district (1972–1976)
- In office November 7, 1978 – November 6, 1990
- Preceded by: Dale Cassens
- Succeeded by: Ken Pruitt
- Constituency: 76th district (1978–1982); 79th district (1982–1990)

Personal details
- Born: Charles Lester Nergard; February 6, 1929 Chicago, Illinois, U.S.
- Died: November 9, 2017 (aged 88) Tallahassee, Florida, U.S.
- Party: Republican
- Spouse: Catherine Misheck
- Children: 2
- Education: George Williams College
- Occupation: Real estate agent

Charles Lester Nergard (February 6, 1929 – November 9, 2017) was an American politician who represented parts of the Treasure Coast in the Florida House of Representatives from 1967 to 1976 and again from 1978 to 1990.

== Early life and education ==
Nergard was born in Chicago, Illinois, in 1929 and moved to Florida in 1956. He attended Schurz Junior College, Wilbur Wright College, and George Williams College. Nergard served in the United States Air Force.

== Career ==
He represented a St. Lucie County-based district on the Treasure Coast from 1967 to 1976 and from 1978 to 1990. During his time in the Florida House, Nergard was also a part-time real estate agent. While he served the 76th district, he succeeded Don Reed.

== Personal life ==
He was married to Catherine Misheck, also a native of Chicago. They had two children. Nergard and his family were members of the Lutheran faith.

Nergard died in Port St. Lucie, Florida, on November 9, 2017, at the age of 88.

Florida House of Representatives
Preceded by District created	Member of the Florida House of Representatives from the 75th district 1967–1972	Succeeded by Jim K. Tillman
Preceded by Don Reed	Member of the Florida House of Representatives from the 76th district 1972–1976	Succeeded by Dale Cassens
Preceded by Dale Cassens	Member of the Florida House of Representatives from the 76th district 1978–1982	Succeeded by Bert J. Harris Jr.
Preceded by Eleanor Weinstock	Member of the Florida House of Representatives from the 79th district 1982–1990	Succeeded by Ken Pruitt
