= 2018 Florida Commissioner of Agriculture election =

- November 6, 2018
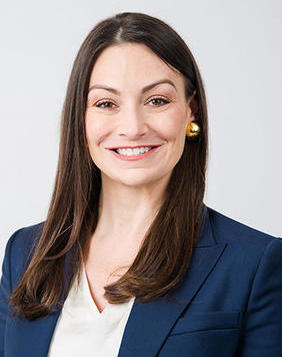

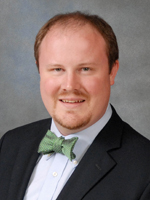
| Nominee | Nikki Fried | Matt Caldwell |
| Party | Democratic | Republican |
| Popular vote | 4,032,954 | 4,026,201 |
| Percentage | 50.04% | 49.96% |
- Fried: 50–60% 60–70% 70–80% 80–90% >90% Caldwell: 50–60% 60–70% 70–80% 80–90% >90% Tie: 50% No votes
Agriculture
Commissioner before election
Adam Putnam
Republican
Elected Agriculture
Commissioner
Nikki Fried
Democratic

The 2018 Florida Commissioner of Agriculture election occurred on November 6, 2018, to elect the Florida Commissioner of Agriculture. Incumbent Republican Commissioner of Agriculture Adam Putnam was term-limited and could not seek a third consecutive term. Democrat Nikki Fried narrowly defeated Republican Matt Caldwell. This was the only statewide victory in 2018 for Democrats in Florida.

As of 2026, this is the last time that a Democrat has won a statewide election in Florida, and the only time since 2012, when Bill Nelson was re-elected to the Senate and Barack Obama won the state in the concurrent presidential race.

== Republican primary ==
=== Candidates ===
==== Declared ====
- Matt Caldwell, state representative
- Denise Grimsley, state senator
- Mike McCalister, retired United States Army colonel, Republican candidate for governor in 2010, Republican candidate for U.S. Senate in 2012
- Baxter Troutman, former state representative

==== Withdrawn ====
- Paul Paulson, businessman, 2015 candidate for mayor of Orlando

==== Declined ====
- Ben Albritton, state representative
- Halsey Beshears, state representative
- Lisa Carlton, former state senator
- Steve Crisafulli, former speaker of the Florida House of Representatives
- Greg Steube, state senator (running for congress)

=== Endorsements ===
Matt Caldwell

U.S. senators

- Marco Rubio (R-FL)

U.S. representatives

- Matt Gaetz, U.S. representative (FL-01)
- Francis Rooney, U.S. representative (FL-19)

State legislators

- Larry Ahern, state representative (R-Seminole)
- Bryan Avila, state representative (R-Miami Springs
- Michael Bileca, state representative (R-Miami)
- Jim Boyd, state representative (R-Bradenton)
- Jeff Brandes, state senator (R-St. Petersburg)
- Danny Burgess, state representative (R-Zephyrhills)
- Cord Byrd, state representative (R-Neptune Beach)
- Chuck Clemons, state representative (R-Newberry)
- Neil Combee, former state representative (R-Polk County)
- Travis Cummings, state representative (R-Fleming Island)
- Manny Díaz Jr., state representative (R-Hialeah)
- Byron Donalds, state representative (R-Naples)
- Brad Drake, state representative (R-Eucheeanna)
- Dane Eagle, state representative (R-Cape Coral)
- Randy Fine, state representative (R-Palm Bay)
- Jason Fischer, state representative (R-Jacksonville)
- Heather Fitzenhagen, state representative (R-Fort Myers)
- Julio Gonzalez, state representative (R-Venice)
- Joe Gruters, state representative (R-Sarasota)
- Shawn Harrison, state representative (R-Tampa)
- Clay Ingram, state representative (R-Pensacola)
- MaryLynn Magar, state representative (R-Tequesta)
- Amber Mariano, state representative (R-Hudson)
- Ralph Massullo, state representative (R-Lecanto)
- George Moraitis, state representative
- Jeanette Núñez, state representative (R-Miami)
- José R. Oliva, state representative (R-Miami Lakes)
- Bobby Payne, state representative (R-Palatka)
- Mel Ponder, state representative (R-Destin)
- Dan Raulerson, former state representative (R-Plant City)
- Paul Renner, state representative (R-Palm Coast)
- Ray Rodrigues, state representative (R-Estero)
- Bob Rommel, state representative (R-Naples)
- Jimmie Todd Smith, former state representative (R-Inverness)
- Ross Spano, state representative (R-Dover)
- Cyndi Stevenson, state representative (R-St. Johns)
- Jennifer Sullivan, state representative (R-Mount Dora)
- Jackie Toledo, state representative (R-Tampa)
- Carlos Trujillo, state representative (R-Miami)
- Jay Trumbull, state representative (R-Panama City)
- Frank White, state representative (R-Pensacola)
- Jayer Williamson, state representative (R-Pace)
- Clay Yarborough, state representative (R-Jacksonville)

Mayors and other municipal leaders

- Michael Adkinson, Walton County sheriff
- Paul Alfrey, Melbourne citycCouncilman
- Brian Anderson, Palm Bay councilman
- Larry Ashley, Okaloosa County sheriff
- Bryan Bell, Holmes County property appraiser
- Harry Bell, Holmes County tax collector
- Gregory Brown, Santa Rosa County property appraiser
- David Earl Cadle, mayor of Crestview
- John Crawford, Nassau County clerk
- Graham Fountain, Okaloosa County commissioner
- Bill Furst, Sarasota County property appraiser
- Joel Greenberg, Seminole County tax collector
- Larry Hart, Lee County tax collector
- Michael Hickox, Nassau County property appraiser
- Wendell Holmes, former Santa Rosa County sheriff
- Tres Holton, Palm Bay councilman
- Kristine Isnardi, Brevard County commissioner
- Wayne Ivey, Brevard County sheriff
- David Johnson, Seminole County property appraiser
- Robert Johnson, Santa Rosa County sheriff
- Scott Lunsford, Escambia County tax collector
- Grant Maloy, Seminole County clerk of court
- Jerry Milligan, former mayor of Crestview
- Scott Monnypenny, Laurel Hill city councilman
- J.D. Peacock, Okaloosa County clerk of court
- A.J. Smith, Franklin County sheriff
- John Tate, Holmes County sheriff
- John Tobia, Brevard County commissioner

Other individuals

- Paul Paulson, businessman, 2015 candidate for mayor of Orlando

Organizations

- Associated Builders and Contractors of Florida
- Florida Chamber of Commerce
- Florida Police Benevolent Association
- NRA Political Victory Fund

Newspapers

- Miami Herald
Denise Grimsley

State legislators

- Bill Galvano, state senator (R-Bradenton), president-designate of the Florida Senate
- Wilton Simpson, state senator (R-Trilby)

Mayors and other municipal leaders

- Mike Chitwood, Volusia County sheriff
- Darryl Daniels, Clay County sheriff
- Sadie Darnell, Alachua County sheriff
- Gator DeLoach, Putnam County sheriff
- Peyton Grinnell, Lake County sheriff
- David Hardin, Glades County sheriff
- Mike Harrison, Gulf County sheriff
- Mark Hunter, Columbia County sheriff
- Arnold Lanier, Hardee County sheriff
- Bill Leeper, Nassau County sheriff
- Bobby McCallum, Levy County sheriff
- Mac McNeill, Jefferson County sheriff
- Jared Miller, Wakulla County sheriff
- Wayne Padgett, Taylor County sheriff
- James Potter, DeSoto County sheriff
- Mike Prendergast, Citrus County sheriff
- Bill Prummell, Charlotte County sheriff
- Scotty Rhoden, Baker County sheriff
- Robert Schultz, Gilchrist County sheriff
- Gordon Smith, Bradford County sheriff
- William Snyder, Martin County sheriff
- Sam St. John, Suwannee County sheriff
- Noel Stephen, Okeechobee County sheriff
- Ben Stewart, Madison County sheriff
- Eddie Joe White, Liberty County sheriff
- Brad Whitehead, Union County sheriff
- Billy Woods, Marion County sheriff

Other individuals

- Al Cardenas, former chairman of the Republican Party of Florida
- Leslie Dougher, former chairwoman of the Republican Party of Florida
- Carole Jean Jordan, former chairwoman of the Republican Party of Florida

Organizations

- Florida Professional Firefighters
- Florida State Fraternal Order of Police

Newspapers

- Tampa Bay Times
Baxter Troutman

Statewide officials

- Jennifer Carroll, former lieutenant governor of Florida

Mayors and other municipal leaders

- Lenny Curry, mayor of Jacksonville

=== Polling ===
| Poll source | Date(s) administered | Sample size | Margin of error | Matt Caldwell | Denise Grimsley | Mike McCalister | Baxter Troutman | Undecided |
|---|---|---|---|---|---|---|---|---|
| Gravis Marketing | August 21–25, 2018 | 579 | ± 4.1% | 18% | 17% | 13% | 19% | 33% |
| Gravis Marketing | August 21–22, 2018 | 321 | ± 5.5% | 20% | 15% | 13% | 18% | 34% |

=== Results ===
Republican primary results
| Party | Candidate | Votes | % |
|---|---|---|---|
| Republican | Matt Caldwell | 523,051 | 34.60% |
| Republican | Denise Grimsley | 402,525 | 26.62% |
| Republican | Baxter Troutman | 393,098 | 26.01% |
| Republican | Mike McCalister | 193,002 | 12.77% |
| Total votes | | 1,511,676 | 100.0% |

== Democratic primary ==
=== Candidates ===
==== Declared ====
- Nikki Fried, lobbyist attorney
- Jeff Porter, mayor of Homestead
- R. David Walker, president of the South Florida Audubon Society

==== Withdrawn ====
- Michael Christine, University of Miami School of Law student
- Daniel Sohn, Palm Beach County Soil and Water Conservation District aide
- Thomas Clayton White Jr., Florida Agricultural & Mechanical University chemistry professor

==== Declined ====
- Katie Edwards-Walpole, state representative
- Patrick Murphy, former U.S. congressman, Democratic nominee for U.S. Senate in 2016

=== Endorsements ===
Nikki Fried

Statewide officials

- Alex Sink, former chief financial officer of Florida, Democratic nominee for Governor in 2010, Democratic nominee for U.S. House in 2014

Newspapers

- Tampa Bay Times

=== Results ===
Democratic primary results
| Party | Candidate | Votes | % |
|---|---|---|---|
| Democratic | Nikki Fried | 826,009 | 58.65% |
| Democratic | R. David Walker | 359,081 | 25.50% |
| Democratic | Jeffrey Duane Porter | 223,299 | 15.85% |
| Total votes | | 1,408,389 | 100.0% |

== General election ==
=== Debate ===
2018 Florida Commissioner of Agriculture debate
| No. | Date | Host | Moderator | Link | Republican | Democratic |
| Key: P Participant A Absent N Not invited I Invited W Withdrawn | | | | | | |
| Key: P Participant A Absent N Not invited I Invited W Withdrawn | | | | | Matt Caldwell | Nikki Fried |
|---|---|---|---|---|---|---|
| 1 | Oct. 21, 2018 | WFOR-TV | Jim DeFede | YouTube (Part 1); YouTube (Part 2); YouTube (Part 3) | P | P |

=== Polling ===
| Poll source | Date(s) administered | Sample size | Margin of error | Matt Caldwell (R) | Nikki Fried (D) | Undecided |
|---|---|---|---|---|---|---|
| University of North Florida | October 23–26, 2018 | 1,046 | ± 3.0% | 41% | 43% | 17% |
| Cherry Communications | September 19–24, 2018 | 622 | ± 4.4% | 37% | 42% | 17% |
| St. Pete Polls | September 5–6, 2018 | 2,240 | ± 2.1% | 45% | 47% | 8% |

Hypothetical polling

With Grimsley

| Poll source | Date(s) administered | Sample size | Margin of error | Nikki Fried (D) | Denise Grimsley (R) | Undecided |
|---|---|---|---|---|---|---|
| Frederick Polls | August 16–20, 2018 | 500 | ± 4.4% | 42% | 40% | 17% |

With Troutman

| Poll source | Date(s) administered | Sample size | Margin of error | Nikki Fried (D) | Baxter Troutman (R) | Undecided |
|---|---|---|---|---|---|---|
| Frederick Polls | August 16–20, 2018 | 500 | ± 4.4% | 43% | 39% | 17% |

=== Results ===
2018 Florida Commissioner of Agriculture election
| Party | Candidate | Votes | % | ±% |
|---|---|---|---|---|
| Democratic | Nikki Fried | 4,032,954 | 50.04% | +8.71% |
| Republican | Matt Caldwell | 4,026,201 | 49.96% | −8.71% |
| Total votes | | 8,059,155 | 100.00% | N/A |
| Democratic gain from Republican | | | | |

==== By congressional district ====
Despite losing the state, Caldwell won 14 of 27 congressional districts.

| District | Caldwell | Fried | Representative |
|---|---|---|---|
| 1st | 69% | 31% | Matt Gaetz |
| 2nd | 67% | 33% | Neal Dunn |
| 3rd | 57% | 43% | Ted Yoho |
| 4th | 63% | 37% | John Rutherford |
| 5th | 36% | 64% | Al Lawson |
| 6th | 57% | 43% | Ron DeSantis |
| 6th | 57% | 43% | Mike Waltz |
| 7th | 45% | 55% | Stephanie Murphy |
| 8th | 58% | 42% | Bill Posey |
| 9th | 44% | 56% | Darren Soto |
| 10th | 37% | 63% | Val Demings |
| 11th | 65% | 35% | Daniel Webster |
| 12th | 56% | 44% | Gus Bilirakis |
| 13th | 45% | 55% | Charlie Crist |
| 14th | 40% | 60% | Kathy Castor |
| 15th | 53% | 47% | Dennis Ross |
| 15th | 53% | 47% | Ross Spano |
| 16th | 53% | 47% | Vern Buchanan |
| 17th | 62% | 38% | Tom Rooney |
| 17th | 62% | 38% | Greg Steube |
| 18th | 53% | 47% | Brian Mast |
| 19th | 62% | 38% | Francis Rooney |
| 20th | 18% | 82% | Alcee Hastings |
| 21st | 38% | 62% | Lois Frankel |
| 22nd | 40% | 60% | Ted Deutch |
| 23rd | 36% | 64% | Debbie Wasserman Schultz |
| 24th | 16% | 84% | Frederica Wilson |
| 25th | 58% | 42% | Mario Díaz-Balart |
| 26th | 46% | 54% | Carlos Curbelo |
| 26th | 46% | 54% | Debbie Mucarsel-Powell |
| 27th | 44% | 56% | Ileana Ros-Lehtinen |
| 27th | 44% | 56% | Donna Shalala |

== See also ==
- Florida Commissioner of Agriculture
