= Denise Grimsley =

American politician

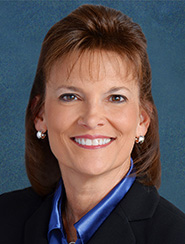

Member of the Florida Senate
- In office November 6, 2012 – November 6, 2018
- Preceded by: Mike Bennett
- Succeeded by: Ben Albritton
- Constituency: 21st district (2012–2016); 26th district (2016–2018)

Member of the Florida House of Representatives from the 77th district
- In office November 2, 2004 – November 6, 2012
- Preceded by: Joe Spratt
- Succeeded by: Dane Eagle (redistricting)

Personal details
- Born: September 21, 1959 (age 67)
- Party: Republican
- Education: Polk Community College (AS); Warner Southern College (BA); University of Miami (MBA)
- Profession: Nurse, citrus grower

Denise Grimsley (born September 21, 1959) is a Republican politician who served as a member of the Florida Senate from 2012 to 2018, and as a member of the Florida House of Representatives from 2004 to 2012. She was an unsuccessful candidate for Commissioner of Agriculture in 2018, but lost the Republican primary.

== Early life and career ==
Grimsley was born in Lakeland, Florida, and attended Polk Community College, where she received her Associate of Science in Nursing; Warner Southern College, where she received a degree in organizational management; and the University of Miami, where she received her Master of Business Administration. When her father fell ill, she took over the family business and served as the Chair of the Florida Petroleum Markets and Convenience Stores Association, a trade organization.

== Florida House of Representatives ==
In 2004, when incumbent State Representative Joe Spratt was unable to seek re-election due to term limits, Grimsley ran to succeed him in the 77th District, which included northern Collier County, Glades County, Hendry County, and Highlands County. She faced attorney Gary Gossett in the Republican primary and won the nomination of the Naples Daily News, which noted, "She has done her homework and would be an able successor to Joe Spratt" due to her experience in the private sector. Grimsley ended up handily defeated Gossett in the primary, winning with 70% of the vote. Upon winning, Grimsley noted, "Obviously, you get into the race to win, but when you win by this margin, it's very, very humbling. Now it's time to get to work for the general election." She then faced Pauline New Born, the Democratic nominee, but New Born did not present a significant obstacle to Grimsley, and she won her first term in the legislature in a landslide, with 67% of the vote. Running for re-election in 2006, Grimsley was opposed by Zane Thomas, a county planner, and the Democratic nominee. She defeated him in a landslide, winning re-election with 60% of the vote to his 40%. In 2008, she faced former North Miami Mayor Elton Gissendanner, who moved to Lake Placid after facing corruption charges from his tenure as Executive Director of the Florida Department of Natural Resources. Despite Gissendanner's high profile, Grimsley easily defeated him to win re-election, scoring 67% of the vote to his 33%. Grimsley was re-elected without opposition in 2010. During her final term in the legislature, she came under fire for accepting a $10,000 contribution from the Walt Disney Company and then working to include a $1.2 million appropriation for a Lynx bus route from Orlando International Airport to Disney's Orlando resort. Grimsley, however, disputed that she delivered the project in exchange for the contribution, saying, "I have never discussed these projects with Disney officials. The Transportation and Economic Development Appropriations Subcommittee appropriated these funds. I trust the subcommittee's judgment that this was a good leverage of tax dollars to facilitate tourism, jobs and infrastructure."

== Florida Senate ==
When Grimsley was prevented from seeking another term in the State House due to term limits, she opted to run for the Florida Senate in the 21st District. She won the Republican primary uncontested. She advanced to the general election, where she faced Stacy Anderson McCland, a lawyer and the Democratic nominee. During the campaign, Grimsley defended the practice of raiding state trust funds to balance the budget, observing, "Remember, we walked into a budget situation with a $4.6 billion shortfall two years ago — so, yes, we took money from trust funds, and we did a series of reductions in every major policy area of the budget. But, in the Transportation Trust Fund, specifically, the money that we swept out of that trust fund into general revenue never stopped an existing project." In the end, Grimsley won over McCland by a solid margin, receiving 57% of the vote to McCland's 43%.

Grimsley's district was reconfigured and renumbered after court-ordered redistricting in 2016.

== Post-senate career ==
Grimsley ran in the 2018 Florida Commissioner of Agriculture election but lost the Republican nomination to Matt Caldwell.

== Other ==
Grimsley is one of the founders of Maggie's List.

Florida House of Representatives
Preceded by Joe Spratt	Member of the Florida House of Representatives from the 77th district 2004–2012	Succeeded by Dane Eagle
Florida Senate
Preceded by Mike Bennett	Member of the Florida Senate from the 21st district 2012–2016	Succeeded by Bill Galvano
Preceded by Bill Galvano	Member of the Florida Senate from the 26th district 2016–2018	Succeeded by Ben Albritton
