= Tiffany Esposito =

American politician

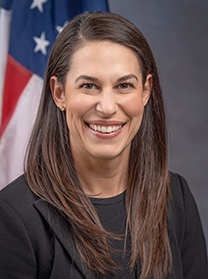

Member of the Florida House of Representatives from the 77th district
- Incumbent
- Assumed office November 8, 2022
- Preceded by: Mike Giallombardo

Personal details
- Born: July 4, 1987 (age 39) Fort Myers, Florida, U.S.
- Party: Republican
- Spouse: Danny Kittinger
- Education: Florida Gulf Coast University (BA, MBA)

Tiffany Esposito is an American politician serving as a member of the Florida House of Representatives for the 77th district. She assumed office on November 8, 2022.

== Education ==
Esposito earned a Bachelor of Arts degree in communication and Master of Business Administration from Florida Gulf Coast University.

== Career ==
From 2009 to 2014, Esposito worked for SWFL Inc., a chamber of commerce for businesses in the South Florida region. In 2015 and 2016, she was the chief of staff for the Greater Naples Chamber of Commerce. In 2016, she rejoined SWFL Inc. as president and CEO. Esposito was elected to the Florida House of Representatives in November 2022.
