= Frank Attkisson =

American politician (1955–2017)

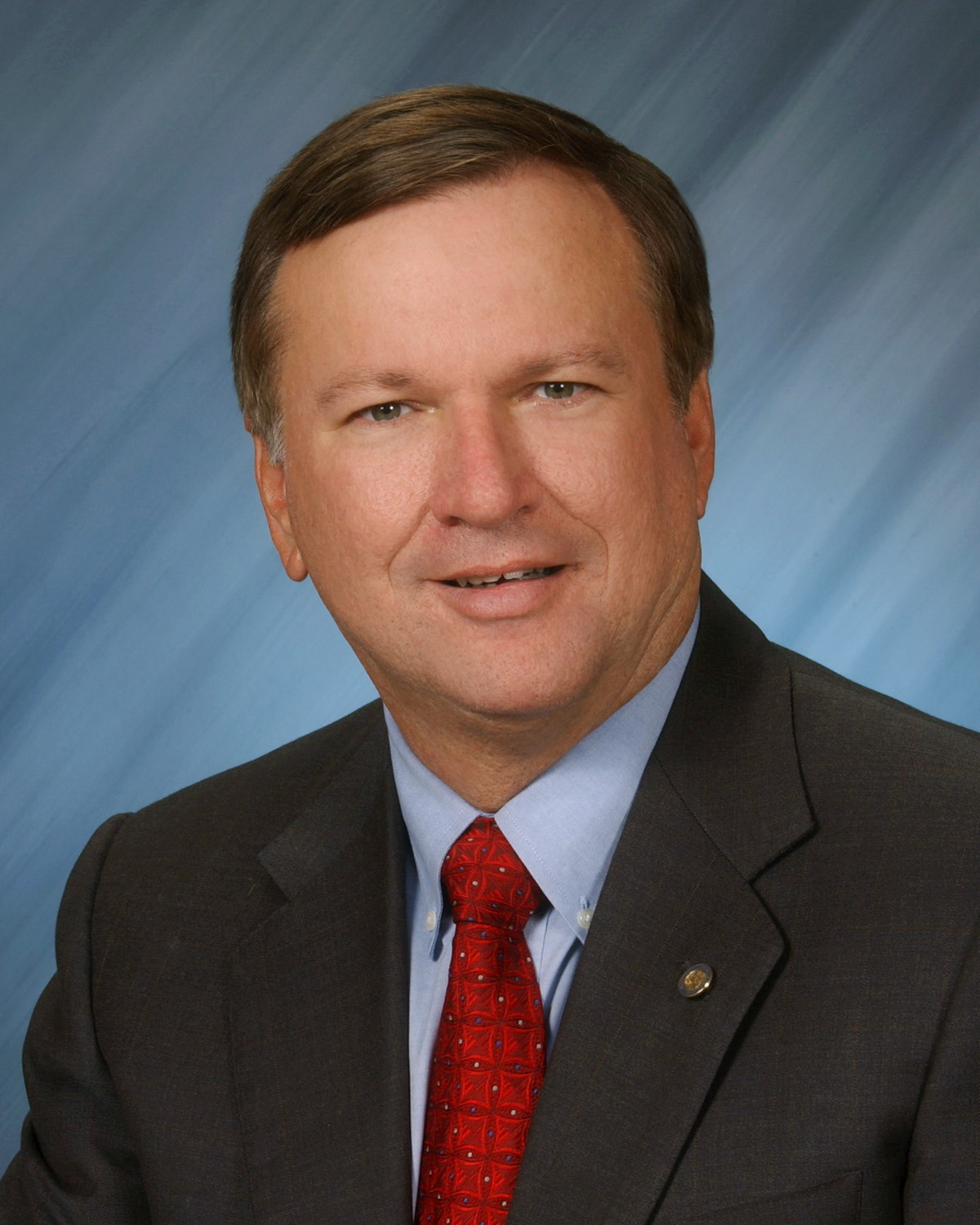

Member of the Osceola County Commission from the 4th district
- In office 2010–2014
- Preceded by: Ken Smith
- Succeeded by: Cheryl Grieb

Member of the Florida House of Representatives from the 79th district
- In office 2000–2008
- Preceded by: Irlo Bronson Jr.
- Succeeded by: Mike Horner

Mayor of Kissimmee
- In office 1996–2000
- Preceded by: John Pollet
- Succeeded by: George Gant

Personal details
- Born: November 2, 1955 St. Petersburg, Florida, US
- Died: April 6, 2017 (aged 61) St. Cloud, Florida, US
- Party: Republican
- Spouse: Juda Attkisson
- Children: 3
- Education: Polk Community College (AA); Florida Southern College (BS)
- Profession: Businessman

Frank C. Attkisson (November 2, 1955 – April 6, 2017) was a Florida politician. He served in the Florida House of Representatives from 2000 to 2008 and as the mayor of Kissimmee, Florida from 1996 to 2000. Attkisson was a former County Commissioner for Osceola County, Florida, having been defeated in 2014.

== Early life and education ==
Attkisson was born in St. Petersburg, Florida. Before graduating from Winter Haven High School in 1973, Attkisson served as the Florida state president of National FFA Organization. Attkisson earned an associate degree from Polk Community College in 1976 and a B.S. in Business Management from Florida Southern College in 1977. Attkisson began his career working for then-Governor Bob Graham in Tallahassee, Florida.

== Career ==
After serving on the Kissimmee Planning Advisory Board, Attkisson was appointed to the Kissimmee City Commission to fill the vacancy left by mayor Bruce Van Meter resigning from the city commission in order to run for state representative. He resigned in 1992 to run for the Florida House of Representative seat held by Irlo Bronson, but Bronson won 55 percent of the vote. Attkisson returned to various positions serving the city of Kissimmee until 1996, when he was elected mayor.

Attkisson ran for the Florida House of Representatives seat held by Irlo Bronson once more in 2000, but this time Bronson was not incumbent due to term limits. Attkisson narrowly won over Democrat Donna Hart. He was reelected in 2002, 2004, and 2006. During his tenure in the Florida House, he was noted for his involvement in "Terri's Law" on the Terri Schiavo case and standardizing the minimum amount of acreage required for property owners to have the opportunity to attain the yearly agricultural tax break offered by the state. He was a member of the Education K-20, Education Appropriations, Local Government & Veterans Affairs, Business Regulation, Telecommunications, and the Finance and Tax Committees, and chaired the Education Innovation subcommittee and the Government Efficiency & Accountability Council (2006–2008).

In 2010 Attkisson was elected to the Osceola County Commission and in 2012 was elected as the chairman of the board. Attkisson ran for reelection in 2014.

== Personal life ==
Attkisson married in September 1979. He and his wife Juda had three children: Laura, Ben, and Chris.

While riding his bicycle, Attkisson was fatally struck from behind by a motorist on the evening of April 6, 2017 in St. Cloud, Florida at Kissimmee Park Road (Route 525) near Lake Tohopekaliga Road. He was 61 years old.

Political offices
Preceded by John Pollet	Mayor of Kissimmee; 1996–2000	Succeeded by George Gant
Preceded by Ken Smith	Member of the Osceola County Commission from the 4th district 2010–2014	Succeeded by Cheryl Grieb
Florida House of Representatives
Preceded by Irlo Bronson	Member of the Florida House of Representatives from the 79th district 2000–2008	Succeeded by Mike Horner
