= Irlo Bronson Jr. =

American politician

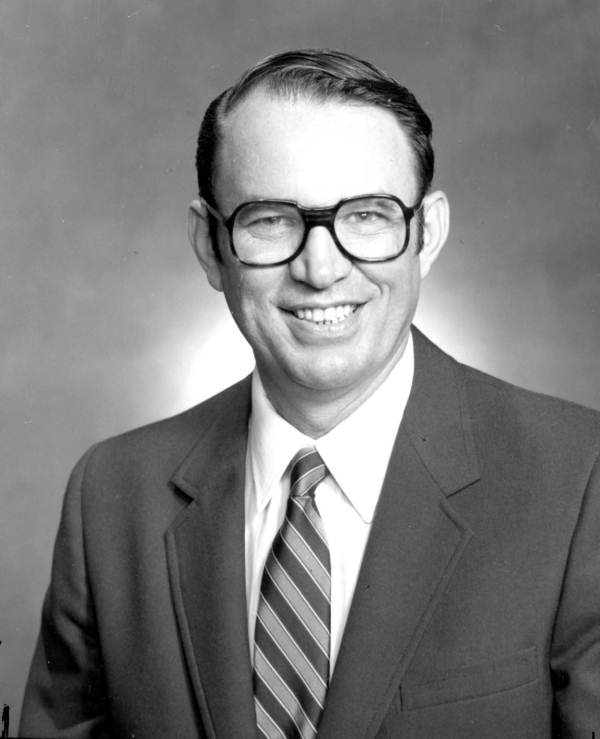

Member of the Florida House of Representatives
- In office November 2, 1982 – November 7, 2000
- Constituency: 77th district (1982–1992); 79th district (1992–2000)

Personal details
- Born: June 4, 1936 Kissimmee, Florida, U.S.
- Died: November 20, 2017 (aged 81) Osceola County, Florida, U.S.
- Party: Democrat (until 1999); Republican (after 1999)
- Relations: Irlo Bronson Sr. (father)
- Relatives: E. L. D. Overstreet (great-grandfather)
- Education: Georgia Military Academy, Oklahoma State University

Irlo Overstreet "Bud" Bronson Jr. (June 4, 1936 – November 20, 2017) was an American politician in the state of Florida. He was the son of prominent rancher and cattleman Irlo Bronson Sr.

Bronson was born in Kissimmee in 1936 to Irlo Bronson Sr. and Flora Belle Bass Bronson. He attended the Georgia Military Academy and Oklahoma State University. He served in the U.S. Army in 1960. He was a lawyer and agricultural businessman. He was elected as a Democrat to the Florida House of Representatives in 1982 to District 77, representing parts of Osceola, Brevard, Indian River, St. Lucie, and Okeechobee Counties. After the 1990 census, he was redistricted into the 79th district, encompassing parts of Osceola and Okeechobee. He was re-elected there and served until 2000. He became a Republican on December 2, 1999, and served his final session as a Republican.

Bronson had five children. He died on November 20, 2017, at the age of 81.
