= Vanessa Oliver =

American politician

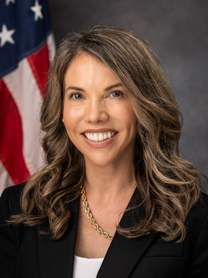

Member of the Florida House of Representatives from the 76th district
- Incumbent
- Assumed office November 5, 2024
- Preceded by: Spencer Roach

Personal details
- Born: January 17, 1988 (age 38) Boston, Massachusetts, U.S.
- Party: Republican
- Education: College of William & Mary (BA); University of Florida Levin College of Law (JD)

Vanessa Oliver (born January 17, 1988) is an American politician serving as a Republican member of the Florida House of Representatives for the 76th district. In 2002, she graduated from the College of William & Mary with a bachelor's in economics and a minor in government. She earned a juris doctor from the University of Florida Levin College of Law in 2006. Oliver works as a CEO, and lives in Punta Gorda, Florida. She moved to Florida in 1988. She is a Catholic.

== Early life and career ==
Vanessa was born in Boston, Massachusetts in 1988. She spent her childhood in Charlotte County, Florida where she attended public schools Peace River Elementary School, Port Charlotte Middle School, and Charlotte High School. She moved north to attend college in Virginia and lived in Washington, DC after graduating. She later returned to Florida to attend the University of Florida where she met her husband David Oliver. She returned to Charlotte County in 2012. Vanessa is a lawyer and is the Chief Executive Officer for a medical transportation company.
