= Irlo Bronson Sr. =

American politician

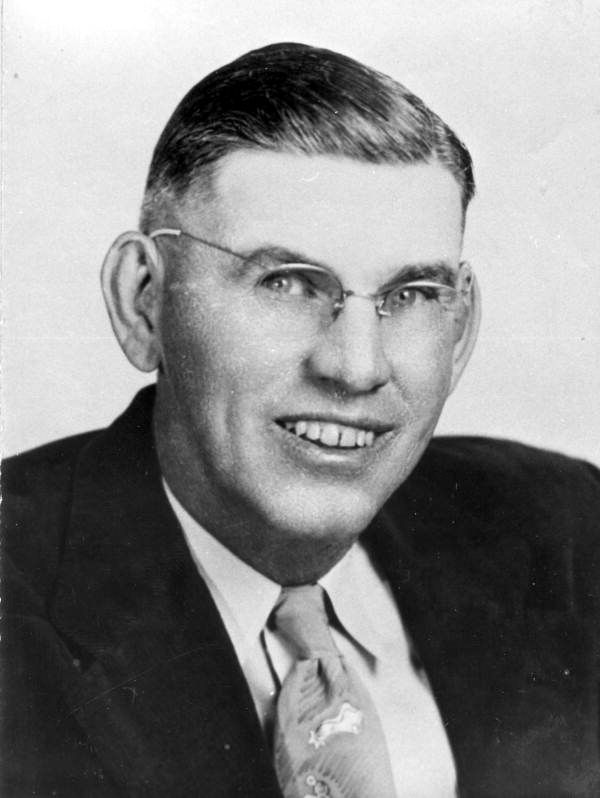

Member of the Florida House of Representatives from the Osceola County district
- In office 1943–1951

Member of the Florida Senate from the 33rd district
- In office 1953–1966

Personal details
- Born: August 3, 1900 Kissimmee, Florida
- Died: March 3, 1973 (aged 72) Kissimmee, Florida
- Party: Democratic
- Spouse: Flora Belle Bass
- Children: Inelle Bronson Kelley Dyer (1928–1996); Irlo Overstreet Bronson Jr. (1936–2017)
- Relatives: E. L. D. Overstreet (maternal grandfather)

Irlo Overstreet Bronson Sr. (August 3, 1900 – March 3, 1973) was an American Democratic politician, rancher and land owner in the state of Florida. Bronson is perhaps best known for selling land to Walt Disney as part of the construction of Florida's Walt Disney World.

== Biography ==
Bronson was born into a prominent cattle ranching family (Note: Includes a photo of Irlo Bronson with Henry Reaves, Charles "Shang" Bronson, and others in working attire with horses and stetsons. The party appears to be wearing brogans instead of "cowboy boots".) in 1900 in Kissimmee to parents George Cephus and Spicey Vianna (Overstreet) Bronson. His maternal grandfather, Eleazar Lewis Daniel (E.L.D.) Overstreet, had previously served in the Florida House of Representatives. He married Flora Belle Bass, (September 21, 1906 – September 27, 1971) of Kissimmee, daughter of Walter ‘Mann’ Bass and Mary Nancy (Yates) Bass in Clearwater, Florida on June 22, 1924.

Bronson was elected to the Florida House of Representatives in 1942, in which he continued to serve, until his election to the Florida State Senate in 1952. He served as speaker pro tempore in 1953. He was a member of the Pork Chop Gang, a group of legislators from rural areas that dominated the state legislature due to malapportionment and used their power to engage in McCarthyist tactics.

Bronson is perhaps best known as the owner of some land which Walt Disney Productions purchased that would later become part of the grounds of Walt Disney World. He sold it "without hesitation" for about $100 per acre ($250/ha). Though his family had thought he had given away the land for virtually nothing, it was said that Bronson envisioned "a future that included better career opportunities and incentives for young people to stay." He also was the founder and president of the Florida Cattlemen's Association from 1946 to 1950.

A 1952 biography on Bronson described him as "an outstanding factor in the life of Osceola County and the state." Following his death in 1973, a large section of U.S. Route 192, including the section leading to the entrance of Walt Disney World, was named the Irlo Bronson Memorial Highway in his memory. He was inducted into the Florida Agricultural Hall of Fame in 1981, and the Mid-Florida Business Hall of Fame on November 14, 1985.

His son, Irlo "Bud" Bronson Jr. served originally as a Democrat, later as a Republican, Florida State Representative from District 79, having been initially elected in 1982.
