= Spencer Roach =

American politician from Florida

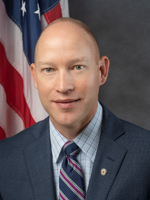

Member of the Florida House of Representatives
- In office November 6, 2018 – November 5, 2024
- Preceded by: Matt Caldwell
- Succeeded by: Vanessa Oliver
- Constituency: 79th district (2018–2022); 76th district (2022–2024)

Personal details
- Born: Lal Spencer Roach III; September 2, 1977 (age 49) Louisiana, U.S.
- Party: Republican
- Education: Edison State College (AA); Florida Gulf Coast University (BA); University of Miami (JD)
- Website: Campaign website

Military service
- Branch/service: United States Coast Guard
- Years of service: 1996–2016

Lal Spencer Roach III (born September 2, 1977) is an American attorney, military veteran, and former Republican member of the Florida House of Representatives. He represented the 79th district from 2018 to 2022, and the 76th district between 2022 and 2024, representing parts of Lee, Charlotte, and DeSoto counties.

== Early life and education ==
A nativce of Louisiana, Roach earned an Associate of Arts degree from Edison State College in 2003, a Bachelor of Arts from Florida Gulf Coast University in 2005, and a Juris Doctor from the University of Miami School of Law in 2012.

He moved to Florida in 2000.

== Military service ==
Roach served for 20 years in the United States Coast Guard, retiring as a judge advocate general. During his service, he was deployed to the Middle East and received multiple awards, including the Meritorious Service Medal, the Coast Guard Commendation Medal, the Coast Guard Achievement Medal, and the Navy and Marine Corps Achievement Medal.

== Political career ==
Roach was first elected to the Florida House in 2018, defeating Democrat Mark Lipton with 58.92% of the vote. He transitioned to representing District 76 after redistricting in 2022.

During his tenure, Roach was known for his work on child welfare reform, post-hurricane recovery efforts, and advocacy for property insurance reform. He helped secure $1 million for the Florida Repertory Theatre following Hurricane Ian and raised nearly $400 million in overall recovery funds.

He also supported legislation requiring parents to act faster to reunite with children in foster care and worked to revamp Florida’s wrongful death laws. However, some of his initiatives—such as expanding Citizens Property Insurance to all residents—failed to gain legislative traction.

== Departure from office ==
In April 2024, Roach announced that he would not seek reelection, citing burnout and financial reasons. “I’m burned out, I’m exhausted, and maybe my heart’s not in it,” he said. He added, “It’s time for me to step away, and I will leave political office the same way I entered it: with my integrity intact, my conscience clear and my heart full.”

His final day in office was November 5, 2024. He was succeeded by Republican Vanessa Oliver.

== Political positions and endorsements ==
Roach was a supporter of Ron DeSantis' 2024 presidential campaign. In 2022, he published an op-ed expressing his concerns about the direction of the Republican Party and criticized the pressure to support Donald Trump. In the column, Roach wrote that he had become a "pariah" within the party for not backing Trump and warned of the dangers of groupthink: "Perhaps my greater concern for the future of the GOP lies in the vicious backlash I have experienced since daring to express an opinion contrary to accepted dogma."

== Personal life ==
Roach resides in North Fort Myers, Florida and is a Christian.
