= Bert J. Harris Jr. =

American politician and farmer (1919–2019)

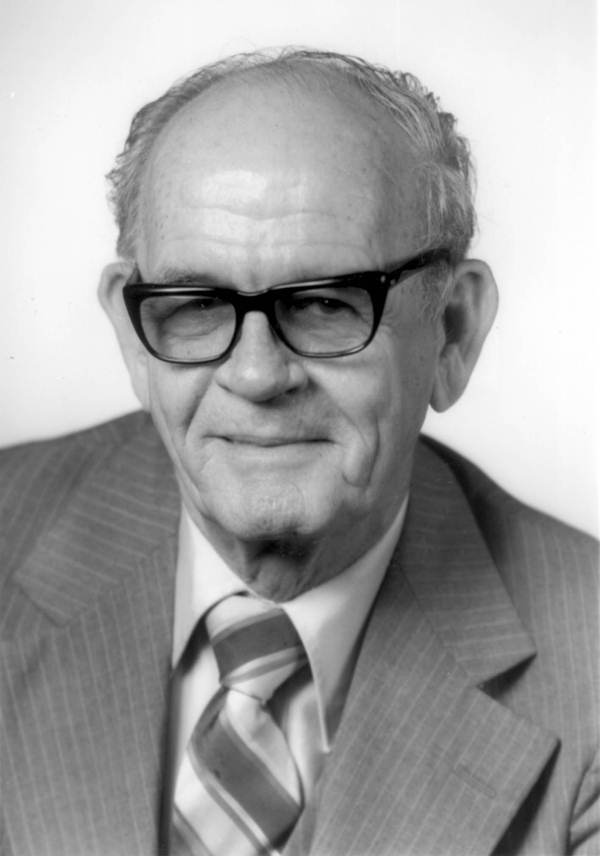

Member of the Florida House of Representatives
- In office November 2, 1982 – November 5, 1996
- Preceded by: Chuck Nergard (redistricting)
- Succeeded by: Joe Spratt
- Constituency: 76th District (1982–1992); 77th District (1992–1996)

Personal details
- Born: December 9, 1919 Warwick, Georgia
- Died: May 19, 2019 (aged 99) Lake Placid, Florida
- Party: Democratic
- Spouse: Elna James Harris
- Education: University of Florida
- Occupation: farmer

Bert Jerome Harris Jr. (December 9, 1919 – May 19, 2019) was an American politician and farmer in the state of Florida.

Harris was born in Warwick, Georgia, and moved to Florida in 1926. He attended the University of Florida, graduating in agriculture. Harris was also a veteran of World War II, serving in the United States Army Air Corps in the Pacific Theater He served in the Florida House of Representatives from 1982 to 1992 for District 76 and 1992 to 1996 for District 77. He was a member of the Democratic Party. Harris lived in Lake Placid, Florida where he was a citrus farmer. He died on May 19, 2019, at the age of 99.
