= Warwick, Georgia =

- City
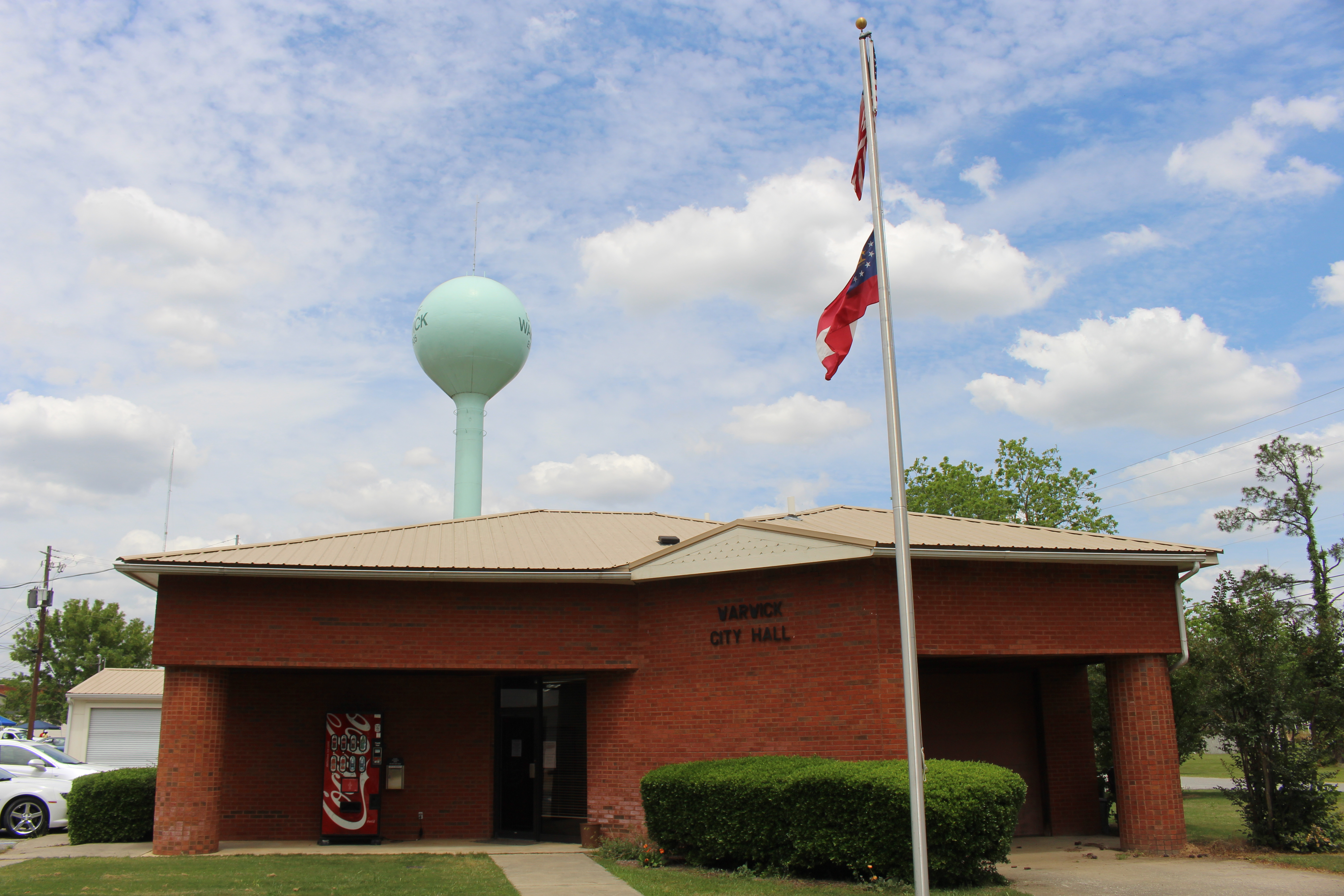
- Warwick City Hall

- Location in Worth County and the state of Georgia
- Coordinates: 31°49′49″N 83°55′15″W
- Country: United States
- State: Georgia
- County: Worth

Area
  - Total: 0.81 sq mi (2.10 km^{2})
  - Land: 0.81 sq mi (2.10 km^{2})
  - Water: 0 sq mi (0.00 km^{2})
- Elevation: 279 ft (85 m)

Population (2020)
  - Total: 504
  - Density: 620.6/sq mi (239.62/km^{2})
- Time zone: UTC-5 (Eastern (EST))
  - Summer (DST): UTC-4 (EDT)
- ZIP code: 31796
- Area code: 229
- FIPS code: 13-80676
- GNIS feature ID: 0333371

Warwick is a city in Worth County, Georgia, United States. As of the 2020 census, Warwick had a population of 504. It is part of the Albany, Georgia metropolitan statistical area.

== Geography ==
Warwick is located at 31°49′49″N 83°55′15″W (31.830351, -83.920705). According to the United States Census Bureau, the city has a total area of 0.8 square miles (2.1 km^{2}), all land.

== Demographics ==
Historical population
| Census | Pop. | Note | %± |
|---|---|---|---|
| 1910 | 226 | | — |
| 1920 | 274 | | 21.2% |
| 1930 | 381 | | 39.1% |
| 1940 | 379 | | −0.5% |
| 1950 | 449 | | 18.5% |
| 1960 | 434 | | −3.3% |
| 1970 | 466 | | 7.4% |
| 1980 | 488 | | 4.7% |
| 1990 | 501 | | 2.7% |
| 2000 | 430 | | −14.2% |
| 2010 | 423 | | −1.6% |
| 2020 | 504 | | 19.1% |
U.S. Decennial Census; 1850-1870 1870-1880; 1890-1910 1920-1930; 1940 1950 1960; 1970 1980 1990; 2000 2010

=== Racial and ethnic composition ===
Warwick city, Georgia – Racial and ethnic composition Note: the US Census treats Hispanic/Latino as an ethnic category. This table excludes Latinos from the racial categories and assigns them to a separate category. Hispanics/Latinos may be of any race.
| Race / Ethnicity (NH = Non-Hispanic) | Pop 2000 | Pop 2010 | Pop 2020 | % 2000 | % 2010 | % 2020 |
|---|---|---|---|---|---|---|
| White alone (NH) | 162 | 149 | 206 | 37.67% | 35.22% | 40.87% |
| Black or African American alone (NH) | 263 | 270 | 285 | 61.16% | 63.83% | 56.55% |
| Native American or Alaska Native alone (NH) | 0 | 1 | 0 | 0.00% | 0.24% | 0.00% |
| Asian alone (NH) | 2 | 2 | 0 | 0.47% | 0.47% | 0.00% |
| Native Hawaiian or Pacific Islander alone (NH) | 0 | 0 | 0 | 0.00% | 0.00% | 0.00% |
| Other race alone (NH) | 0 | 0 | 0 | 0.00% | 0.00% | 0.00% |
| Mixed race or Multiracial (NH) | 1 | 1 | 9 | 0.23% | 0.24% | 1.79% |
| Hispanic or Latino (any race) | 2 | 0 | 4 | 0.47% | 0.00% | 0.79% |
| Total | 430 | 423 | 504 | 100.00% | 100.00% | 100.00% |

=== 2020 census ===
As of the 2020 United States census, there were 504 people, 215 households, and 132 families residing in the city.

== National Grits Festival ==
The National Grits Festival began around 1999 and took a 4-year hiatus that ended in 2017. At that time, Mayor Juanita Kinchen, city councilors, and local citizens restarted the festival. The first year back from hiatus enjoyed approximately 3,000 attendees. The Grits Festival committee helped fund the expansion of electricity to another portion of the city square and doubled the size of the festival in 2018.

== Notable person ==
- Bert J. Harris Jr., Florida state legislator and citrus farmer
