= Mike Horner (politician) =

American politician

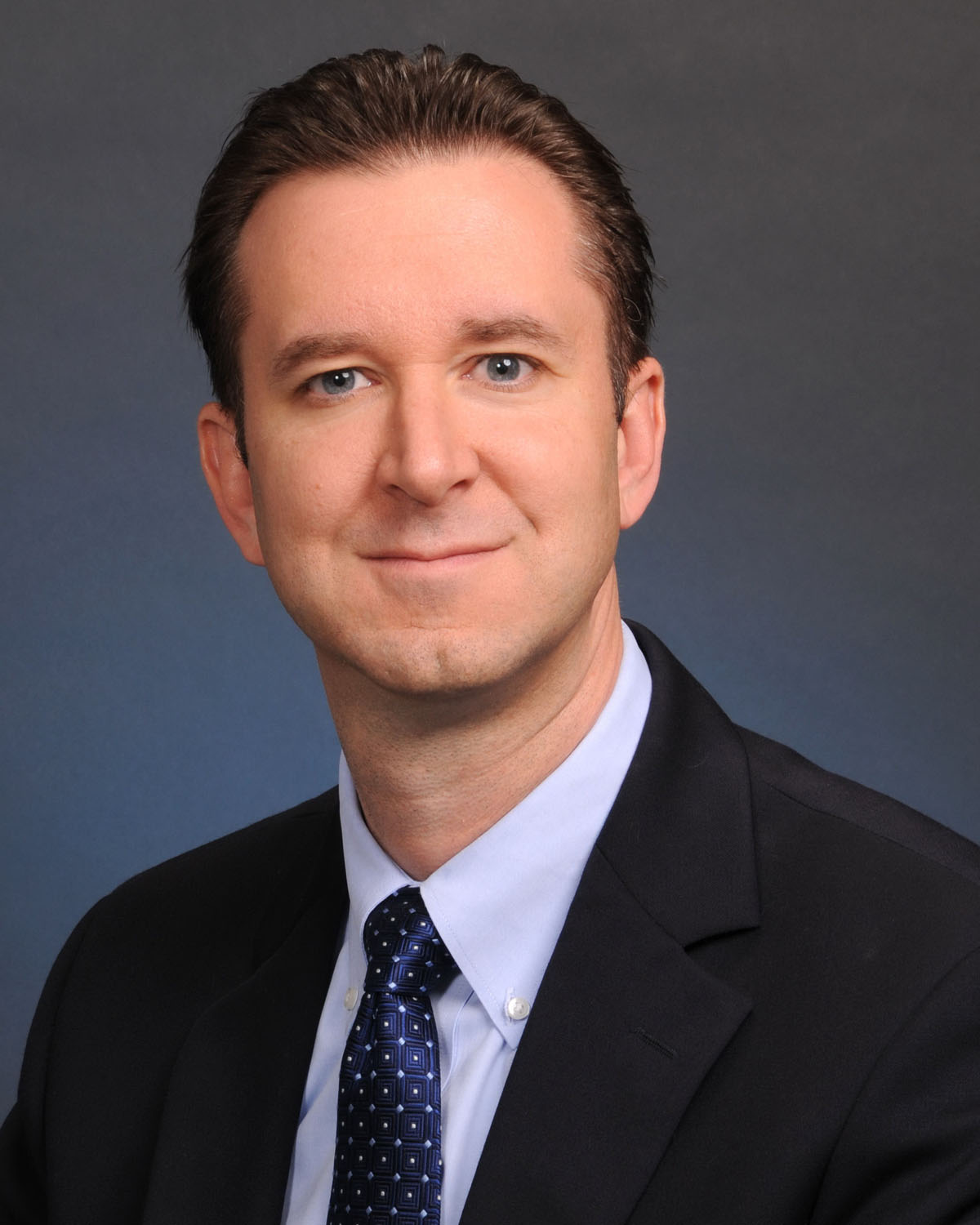

Member of the Florida House of Representatives from the 79th district
- In office November 19, 2008 – September 24, 2012
- Preceded by: Frank Attkisson
- Succeeded by: Matt Caldwell

Personal details
- Born: January 8, 1968 (age 58)
- Party: Republican
- Spouse: Abby Horner
- Education: University of Florida (B.A.); University of Central Florida (M.P.A.)
- Profession: Business

Michael Horner (born January 8, 1968, in Jacksonville, Florida) is an American Republican politician and a former member of the Florida House of Representatives.

In 2012, Horner entered the race for the District 42 representative's seat, but dropped out of the race and resigned from Osceola County Chamber of Commerce when his name appeared on a list of clientele related to an investigation of an alleged brothel in Orange County that catered to "gay clients".

Additionally, Horner was arrested in May 2024, due to battering an Osceola school board member.

Horner graduated with a bachelor's degree from the University of Florida in 1989. He graduated from the University of Central Florida with a master's degree in public administration in 1995. He currently lives in Kissimmee, Florida with his family.
