= Nick Thompson (politician) =

American politician

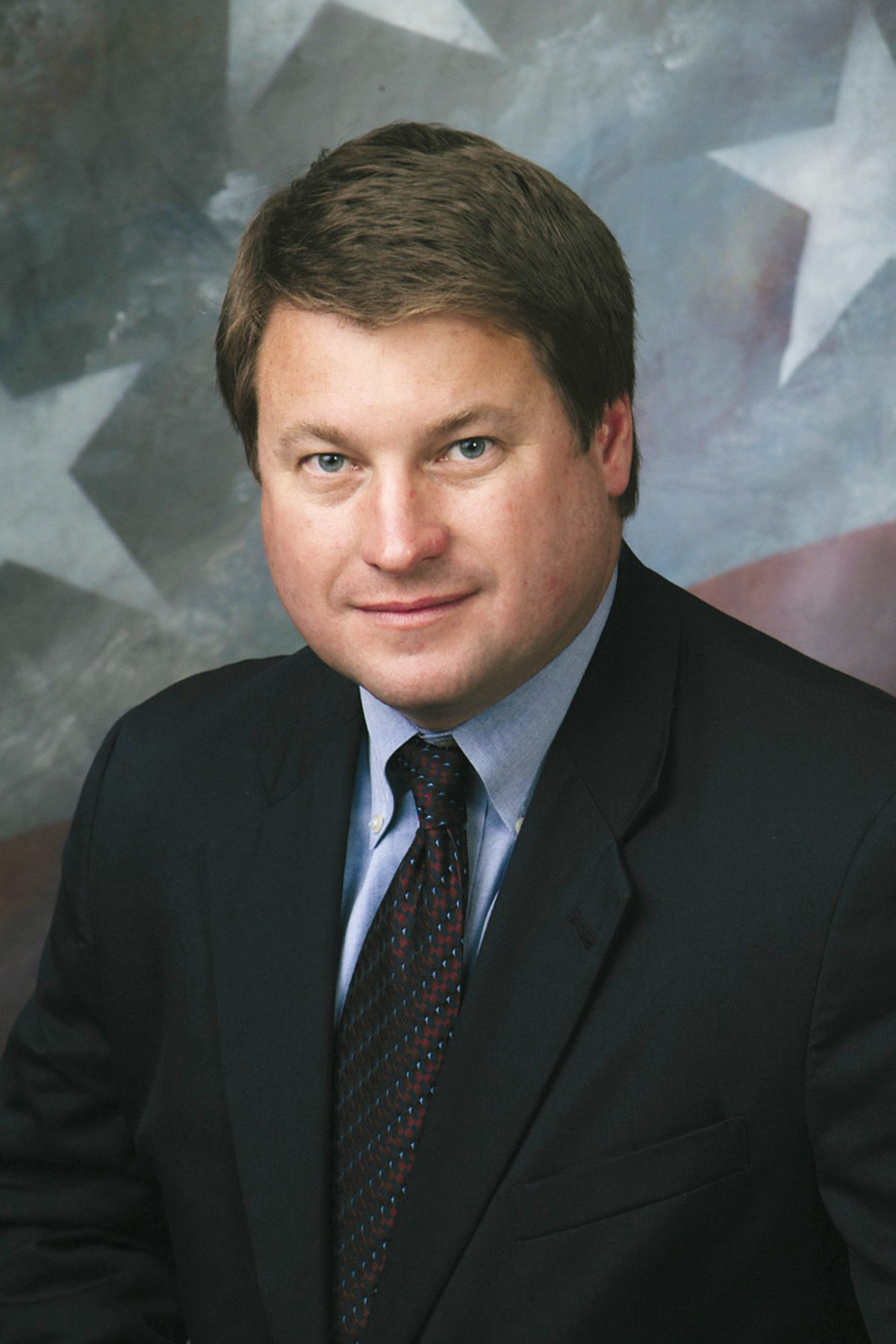

Member of the Florida House of Representatives from the 73rd district
- In office November 7, 2006 – November 2, 2010
- Preceded by: Bruce Kyle
- Succeeded by: Matt Caldwell

Personal details
- Born: February 7, 1966 (age 60)
- Party: Republican
- Spouse: Chené Thompson
- Profession: Lawyer

Nick Thompson (born February 7, 1966) is a former Fort Myers, Florida Republican politician who served as the Representative for District 73 in the House of Representatives of the U.S. state of Florida. He was first elected in 2006 and re-elected in 2008. He chaired the Civil Justice & Courts Policy Committee.

He chose not to run for re-election to the Florida House of Representatives and in 2010 was elected to the 20th Judicial Circuit Court in Florida, a seat formerly held by his father. He currently serves as a Circuit Court Judge.

Representative Thompson was born in Pensacola, Florida. In 1989, he received his Bachelor of Arts in Journalism from Washington and Lee University. In 1995, he earned his Juris Doctor from Nova Southeastern University. He served as a lead prosecutor for the Florida State Attorney's Office.
