= Joe Spratt =

American politician (born 1947)

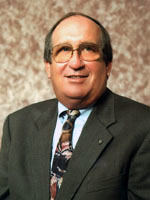

Member of the Florida House of Representatives from the 77th district
- In office November 5, 1996 – November 2, 2004
- Preceded by: Bert J. Harris Jr.
- Succeeded by: Denise Grimsley

Personal details
- Born: March 10, 1947 (age 79) Hamlet, North Carolina
- Party: Democratic (before 1999); Republican (1999–present)
- Spouse: Barbara "Bobbie" Waters
- Children: Jim, Beth
- Education: Abraham Baldwin Agricultural College; Edison Junior College; Troy State University (B.A.)
- Occupation: Real estate developer

Joseph R. "Joe" Spratt (born March 10, 1947) is a Republican politician and real estate developer who served as a member of the Florida House of Representatives from the 77th district from 1996 to 2004. He was originally elected as a Democrat but switched to the Republican Party in 1999.

== Early life and career ==
Spratt was born in Hamlet, North Carolina, and moved to Florida in 1948. He graduated from Troy State University with his bachelor's degree in biological science in 1970 after previously attending Abraham Baldwin Agricultural College and Edison Junior College.

In 1988, Spratt ran for the Hendry County Commission from District 3, and won the Democratic primary in a landslide, defeating Jack Simpson and Richard Pfluge with 61 percent of the vote. In the general election, Spratt defeated Republican nominee Ray Harn by a wide margin, receiving 59 percent of the vote to Harn's 41 percent. Spratt ran for re-election in 1992, and was challenged by Charlie Lassett in the Democratic primary. He narrowly won renomination, receiving 54 percent of the vote, and faced no opposition in the general election.

== Florida House of Representatives ==
In 1996, Democratic State Representative Bert J. Harris Jr. declined to seek re-election to another term, and Spratt ran to succeed him in the 77th district, which included Glades and Hendry counties, most of Highlands County, and northern Collier County. Spratt won the Democratic primary unopposed, and faced Republican nominee Frank Platt, an engineer, in the general election. Spratt narrowly defeated Platt, winning 51 percent of the vote to Platt's 49 percent, a margin of 1,071 votes.

Spratt ran for re-election in 1998, and faced Sebring City Councilman John Payne, the Republican nominee. Spratt narrowly defeated Payne, winning re-election with 50.3 percent of the vote, and defeating Payne by just 198 votes.

In 1999, Spratt announced that he was switching parties, and joining the Republican Party, saying, "My district and constituents are pretty evenly split between [Democrats] and [Republicans], but it's an awfully conservative district. I just didn't feel that the Democratic Party is going that way. I've supported most of the Republican issues since being elected, because they are the more conservative side."

Spratt ran for re-election as a Republican in 2000 and won the Republican nomination unopposed. He was challenged by Doris Gentry, the Democratic nominee and an academic advisor at South Florida Community College. He defeated Gentry by a wide margin, winning 55 percent of the vote to her 45 percent.

In 2002, Spratt ran for re-election to his final term in the State House. He faced no major-party opposition, and was challenged by Libertarian nominee Scott Hudmon. Spratt won re-election in a landslide, winning 80 percent of the vote.

Spratt was term-limited in 2004, and was hired by the South Florida Water Management District to serve as a legislative liaison. However, environmental groups ran television advertisements criticizing the District for hiring Spratt, who worked to push back a deadline for Everglades cleanup by a decade, and Spratt attracted controversy for telling the Clewiston Chamber of Commerce that the District was "moving too fast on Everglades restoration." Spratt ultimately resigned from the position.
