= Don Reed (politician) =

American politician (1933–1996)

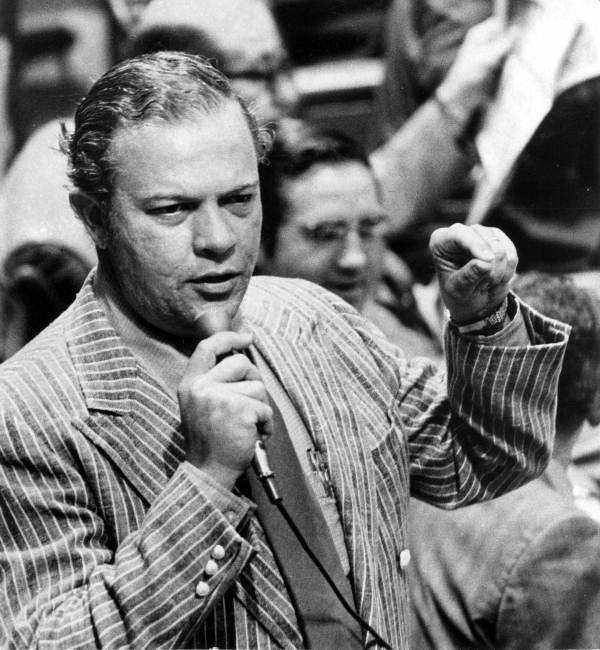
- Reed in 1971

Member of the Florida House of Representatives from Palm Beach County
- In office 1963–1967

Member of the Florida House of Representatives from the 76th district
- In office 1967–1972
- Preceded by: District established
- Succeeded by: Chuck Nergard

Personal details
- Born: Donald Harry Reed Jr. February 28, 1933 East Liverpool, Ohio, U.S.
- Died: November 28, 1996 (aged 63) Oklahoma, U.S.
- Party: Republican
- Education: Ohio State University; University of Florida

Donald Harry Reed Jr. (February 28, 1933 – November 28, 1996) was an American politician. A member of the Republican Party, he served in the Florida House of Representatives from 1963 to 1972.

== Life and career ==
Reed was born in East Liverpool, Ohio, the son of Donald Sr. and Elfreda Reed. He attended Ohio State University, earning his B.A. degree in 1957. He also attended the University of Florida, earning his LLB degree in 1960, which after earning his degrees, he worked as an attorney in Boca Raton, Florida.

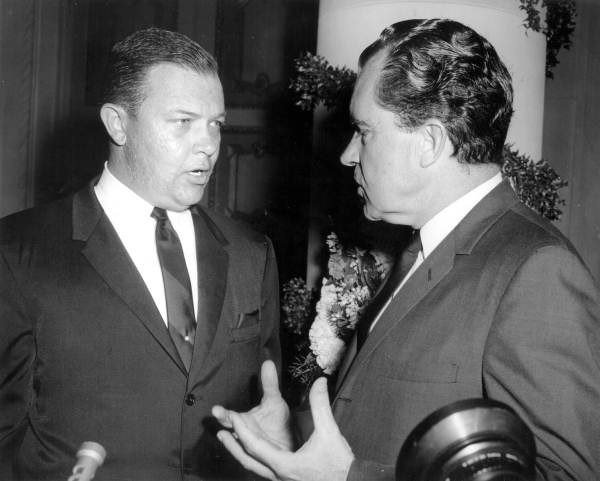
Reed (left) with Richard Nixon in the 1970s

Reed served in the Florida House of Representatives from 1963 to 1972.

== Death ==
Reed died on November 28, 1996, of a cerebral hemmorage in Oklahoma, at the age of 63.
