= Nikki Fried =

American lawyer and politician (born 1977)

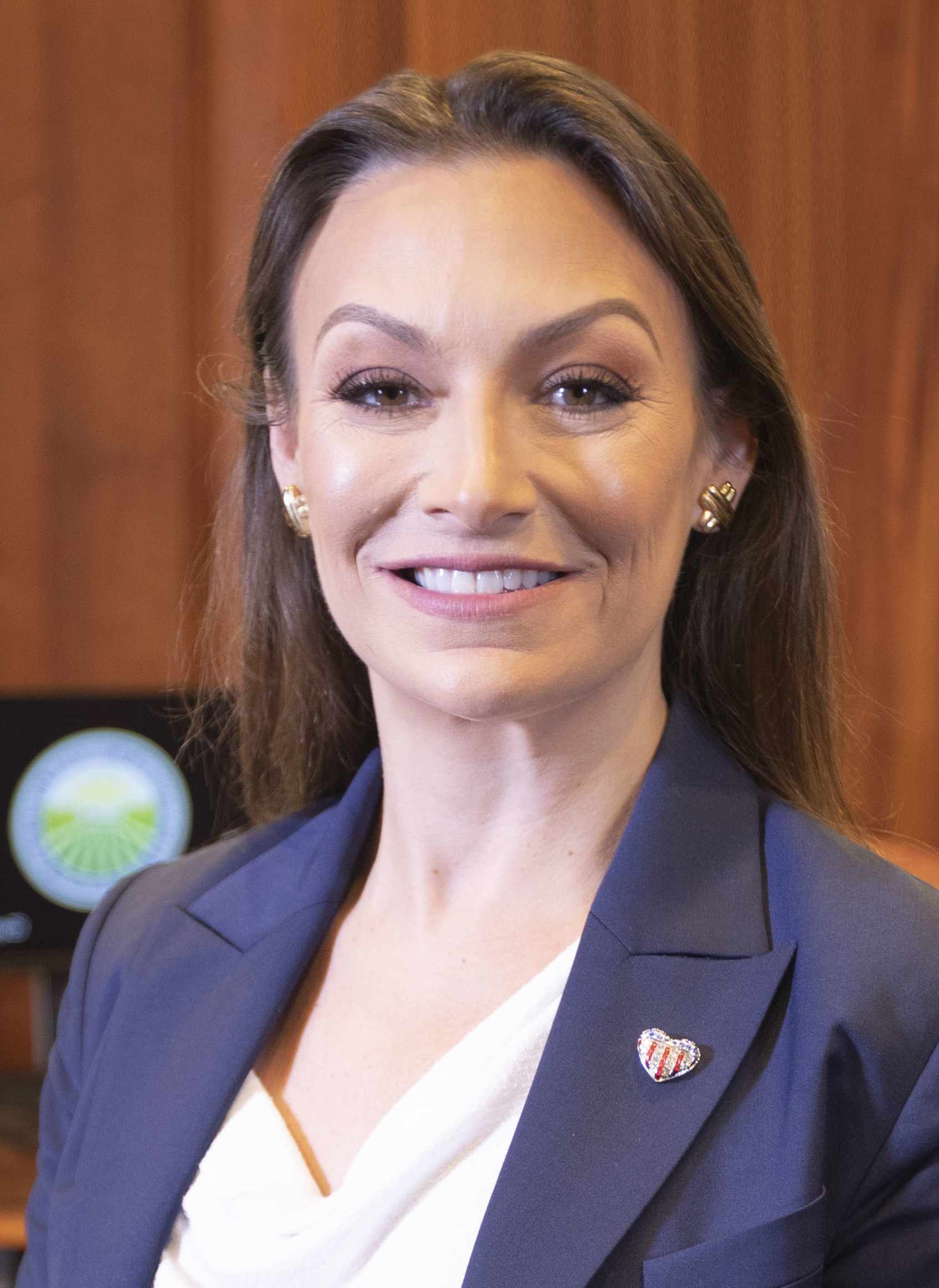
- Official portrait, 2019

Chair of the Florida Democratic Party
- Incumbent
- Assumed office February 25, 2023
- Preceded by: Manny Diaz

12th Florida Commissioner of Agriculture
- In office January 8, 2019 – January 3, 2023
- Governor: Ron DeSantis
- Preceded by: Adam Putnam
- Succeeded by: Wilton Simpson

Personal details
- Born: Nicole Heather Fried; December 13, 1977 (age 48) Miami, Florida, U.S.
- Party: Democratic
- Domestic partner: Jake Bergmann (engaged)
- Education: University of Florida (BA, MA, JD)
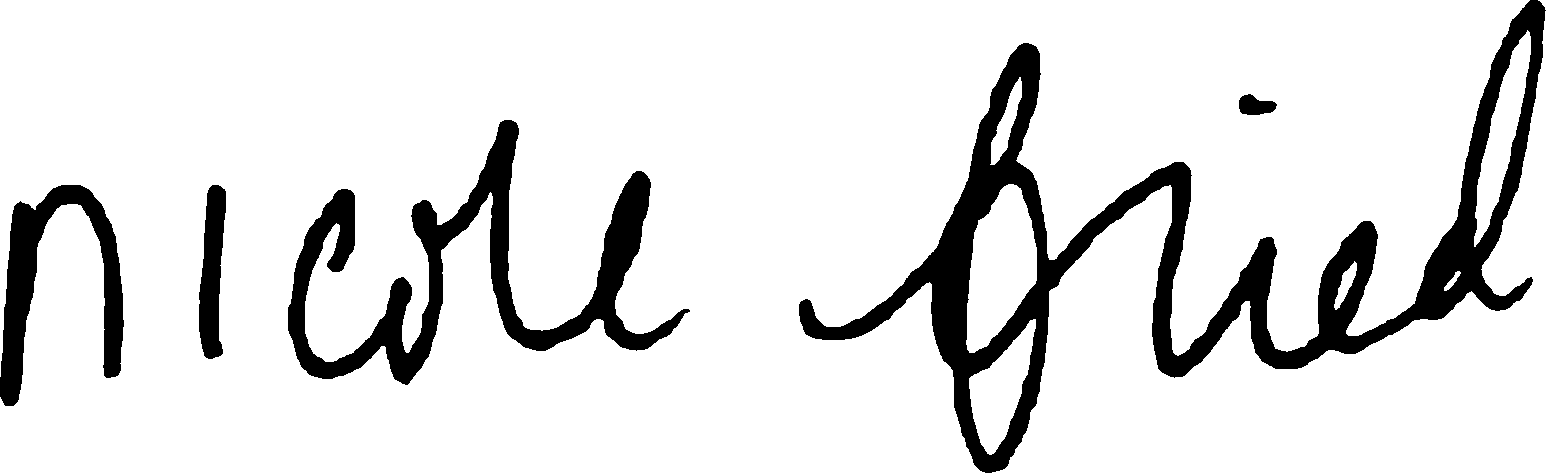
- Signature
- Website: Official website

Nicole Heather "Nikki" Fried (/friːd/ FREED; born December 13, 1977) is an American politician, lawyer, and lobbyist serving as the chair of the Florida Democratic Party since 2023. Before she was elected chair, she served as the 12th Florida commissioner of agriculture from 2019 to 2023. As of 2026, she is the last Democrat to have held or won statewide office in Florida.

Fried graduated from the University of Florida in 2003 and went on to earn her Juris Doctor from the Levin College of Law. She practiced various forms of law, including corporate law, foreclosure defense, and public defense. She later worked as a lobbyist for the marijuana industry.

In 2018, Fried narrowly defeated state representative Matt Caldwell by a margin of 0.08%, in the Florida commissioner of agriculture election. She is the first woman to be elected to the position and was the only Democrat to win a statewide race in the 2018 Florida elections. During her tenure, she redesigned gas pump stickers, promoted a Florida gun law bill, partook in Florida v. Georgia over waters within the ACF River Basin, and appointed two lobbyists for the Florida Sugar Cane League.

Fried was selected as one of 17 speakers to jointly deliver the keynote address at the 2020 Democratic National Convention. She did not seek re-election in 2022 and instead ran in the 2022 Florida gubernatorial election, losing the primary to Charlie Crist.

== Early life and education ==
Nicole Heather Fried was born December 13, 1977, in Miami, Florida, to Jewish parents Ronald, an attorney, and Lori, a stay-at-home mother. Her parents divorced when she was 13, leaving Fried and her younger sister to be raised primarily by their mother, who became a preschool teacher after the divorce. Fried graduated from Miami Palmetto High School.

Fried graduated from the University of Florida, where she was student body president and a member of Florida Blue Key, receiving her bachelor's degree in political science and her master's degree in political campaigning. In 2003, she received her Juris Doctor from the University of Florida.

== Career ==
After graduating, Fried worked at the law firm of Holland & Knight in Jacksonville, alongside Ashley Moody, a friend of Fried from the University of Florida who would later serve alongside her as the Florida Attorney General. Unhappy working as a corporate lawyer, Fried left Holland & Knight in 2006 and became a public defender for Florida's 8th circuit court, which covers much of North Central Florida, including Alachua County.

Fried was a foreclosure defense lawyer from 2009 until 2011, when she joined the law and lobbying firm of Colodny Fass. Among her major clients as a lobbyist were the Hillsborough Area Regional Transit Authority, the Walt Disney Company, Duke Energy, and HCA Healthcare.

In 2016, Fried established her own lobbying firm, called Igniting Florida, in Broward County. Her main clients were the School Board of Broward County and the statewide medical marijuana industry, which had expanded following the passage of Florida Amendment 2, which legalized medical marijuana, in the 2016 elections.

== Florida commissioner of agriculture and consumer services ==
=== 2018 election ===
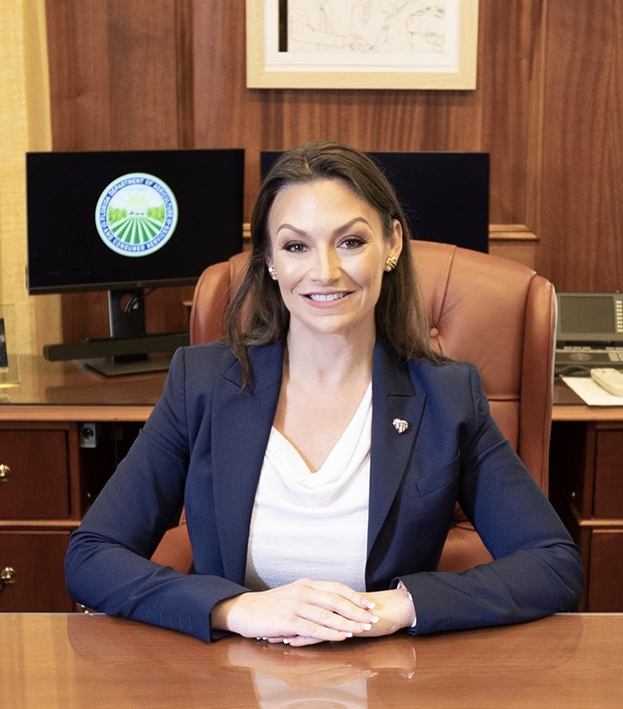
Fried's official portrait taken in 2019

Fried won the Democratic nomination for Florida commissioner of agriculture in 2018, easily defeating Jeff Porter, the mayor of Homestead and R. David Walker, an environmental activist, despite her primary opponents criticizing her for her past campaign contributions to Republicans.

In the general election, Fried faced off against the Republican nominee Matt Caldwell, a state representative from North Fort Myers. Fried ran on a platform in favor of removing obstacles to medical marijuana in Florida. She described herself as "a fierce advocate for expanding access to medical marijuana for suffering Floridians", and called for placing regulation of medical marijuana under the jurisdiction of the Florida Department of Agriculture and Consumer Services rather than the Florida Department of Health.

During the campaign, Fried also pledged to "ensure full background checks are completed on gun permits", a task which falls under the jurisdiction of the Florida Department of Agriculture. Fried endorsed Amendment 4, a ballot initiative which restores voting rights for felons, excluding murderers and felony sex offenders.

On August 19, 2018, Wells Fargo announced it was closing Fried's campaign bank account because of her ties with medical marijuana. Fried's campaign transferred the $137,000 in the account to a new bank account with BB&T. However, on August 29, 2018, BB&T also announced the closure of Fried's campaign bank account on the same grounds.

Fried was endorsed by the Tampa Bay Times, the Sun Sentinel, and the Palm Beach Post. Fried also received the endorsements of the Sierra Club, Equality Florida, Everytown for Gun Safety, and the Brady Campaign, while Caldwell received the endorsements of business and industry groups, including the Florida Farm Bureau, the Florida Chamber of Commerce, and the Associated Industries of Florida.

Fried defeated Caldwell by an extremely narrow margin. While initial returns on Election Day showed Caldwell in the lead, by the completion of the count, Fried had narrowly taken the lead with a margin of just 0.06% of votes separating the two candidates. Following both a machine recount and a manual recount, Fried ultimately defeated Caldwell by 6,753 votes (0.08%) out of over eight million votes cast. Fried became the first Democrat to win the Florida Commissioner of Agriculture position since 1998, as well as becoming the only woman elected to the position. She was also the only Democratic candidate to win a statewide race in Florida in 2018.

=== Tenure ===
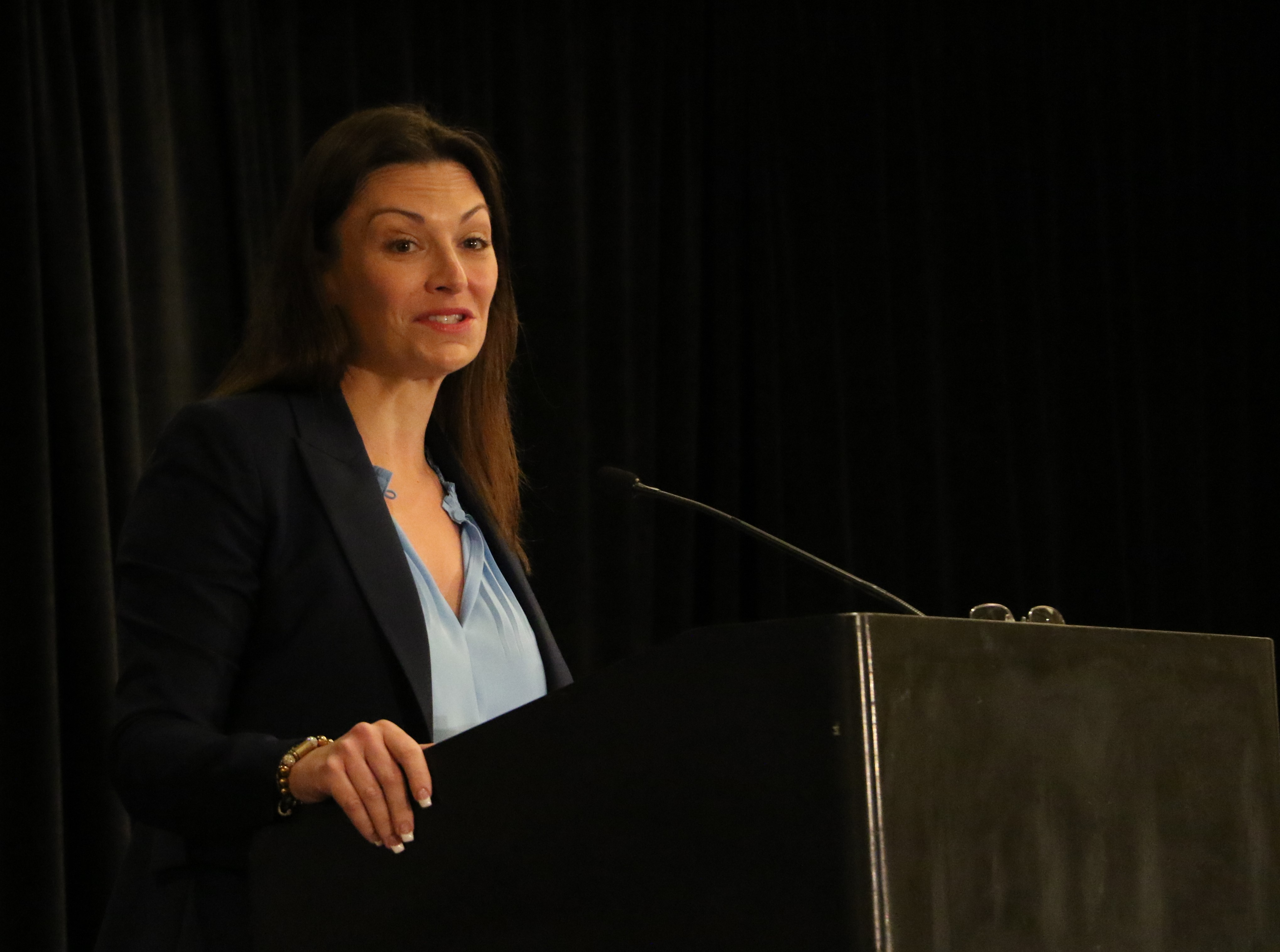
Fried at the Climate Leadership Summit in Monroe County in 2019

Shortly after entering office in 2019, Fried's office redesigned the Florida Department of Agriculture's certified gas pump stickers, which verify to customers the gas pump is state approved. Previous commissioners had put their own names on the stickers for decades, but Fried was the first to put a color photograph of herself on the sticker. The Republican Party of Florida accused Fried of using taxpayer funds to increase her political exposure, and the Florida Legislature quickly passed a law limiting the taxpayer-funded stickers to only "a combination of lettering, numbering, words, or the department logo". The stickers were quickly replaced with a new design that did not have her photograph.

Fried opposed the United States–Mexico–Canada Agreement, the free trade agreement that officially replaced the 1994 North American Free Trade Agreement, on the basis that it contained insufficient protections for Florida farmers.

Fried also crafted legislation with Democratic state representative Javier Fernandez targeting Florida gun laws. The bill, HB 809, would have required retention of fingerprint records, require proof of completion of firearms safety training for a license to be renewed and reduce the term for a concealed-weapons permit from seven to five years. It did not pass the legislature in 2019.

In August 2019, the Florida Department of Agriculture appointed two registered lobbyists for the Florida Sugar Cane League to consult on the Lake Okeechobee System Operating Manual Project Delivery Team, which was set to advise the United States Army Corps of Engineers on procedures for lake levels. Environmentalists called for lake levels to be lowered to prevent harmful discharges and red tides, while the sugar industry advocated for keeping levels high to avoid the threat of low water supply for farmers and municipalities. Republican U.S. representative Brian Mast, whose district includes part of Lake Okeechobee, sent a letter to the Army Corps of Engineers seeking the lobbyists' removal, alleging the appointments were an attempt to force sugar industry influence into the process. Seven Florida environmental groups, including Friends of the Everglades and Everglades Trust, called for the members to be removed and criticized their appointment. While Fried originally defended the appointments as expert consultants, she later fired their consulting firm and removed them from working on the project.

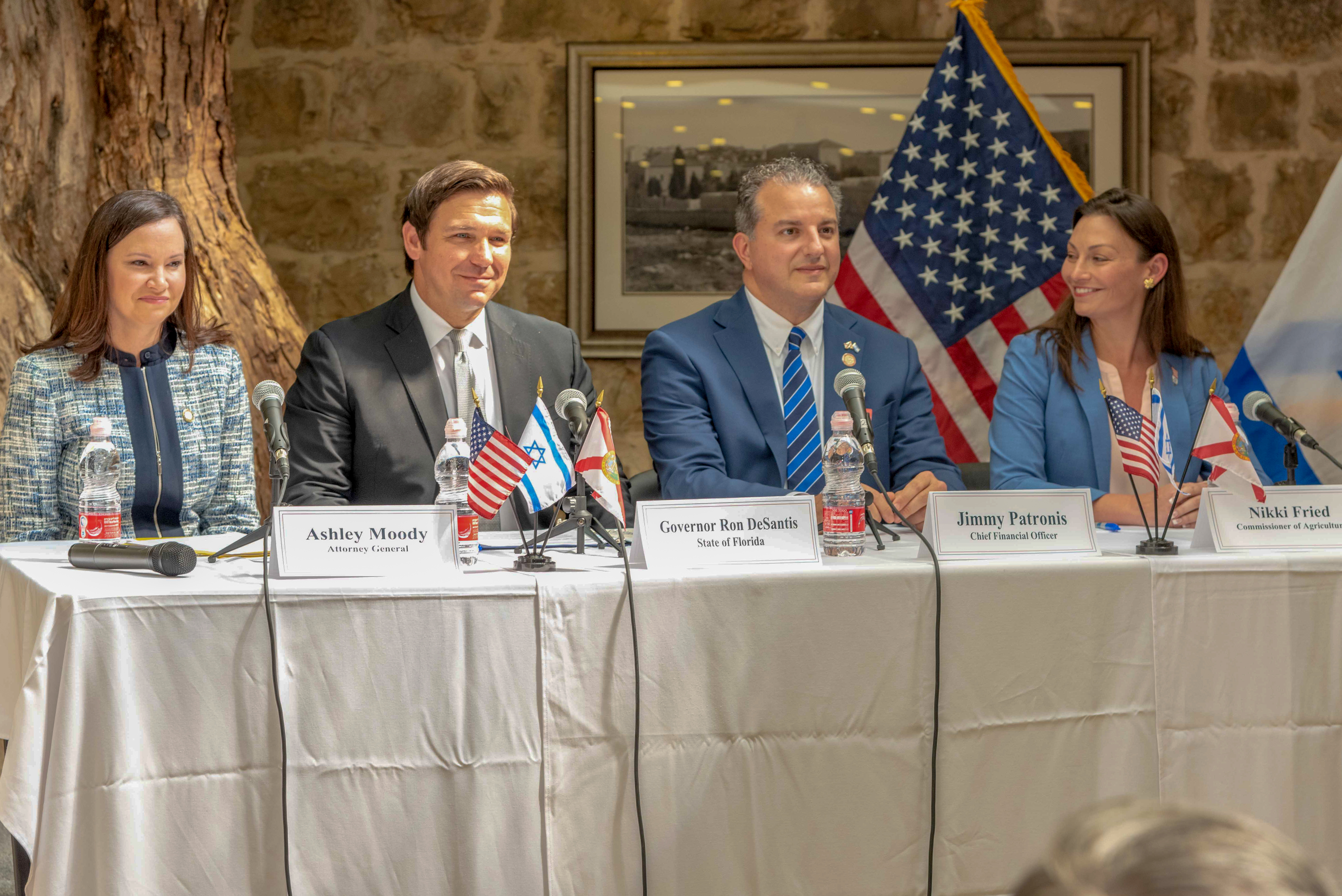
The Florida Cabinet and Governor, in 2019

In December 2019, Fried abstained from a cabinet vote for the nominee for commissioner of the Florida Office of Financial Regulation, Russell Weigel. However, Florida state law states that cabinet officials can not abstain from cabinet votes unless there is a conflict of interest. Fried said she had concerns over the transparency of the nomination and said her interpretation of the law did not mandate her to vote yes or no.

In 2020, Fried's office requested and was granted federal waivers to provide free meals to students, despite schools being closed because of the COVID-19 pandemic.

Later in 2020, Fried partly delivered the keynote address at the 2020 Democratic National Convention, joining 16 other speakers designated as "rising stars". Fried critiqued President Donald Trump's response to the COVID-19 pandemic, and reiterated the Democratic Party's commitment to fighting climate change.

==== Florida v. Georgia ====
Beginning in 2018, Fried was engaged in a lawsuit against the state of Georgia, claiming it was siphoning too much water for use from the Flint River, a part of the Apalachicola River system, which flows south into Florida before draining into Apalachicola Bay. The lawsuit alleged that Georgia's use of too much water caused an increase in salinity in the Apalachicola Bay estuary, subsequently causing the collapse of the estuary's oyster fishery, resulting in income and job losses of 98% of the value of Florida's oyster industry.

The lawsuit, initiated by the state of Florida in 2013 following a series of droughts, was dismissed in 2016 by special master appointed by the United States Supreme Court. However, the Supreme Court ruled 5–4 in Florida v. Georgia (2018) that the case should be reheard and reviewed.

In April 2021, the US Supreme Court ruled 9–0 in favor of Georgia in Florida v. Georgia (2021). The unanimous opinion, written by Justice Amy Coney Barrett, stated that Fried had not provided sufficient evidence that Georgia's water use had resulted in the oyster fisheries' collapse. Fried had chosen not to present the testimony of either oceanographers or marine biologists, instead relying only on reports from hydrologists and statisticians.

== 2022 Florida gubernatorial election ==
On June 1, 2021, Fried declared her candidacy for governor of Florida in the 2022 Florida gubernatorial election. She lost to Charlie Crist, a U.S. representative and the former governor of Florida, in the Democratic primary.

Before her entry into the race, Fried heavily criticized DeSantis, calling him an "authoritarian dictator who is borderline fascist", and attacked him for his response to the COVID-19 pandemic, as well as his signing of an election reform bill that she called voter suppression. Fried also criticized the "rigged system in Florida", which she called corrupt and anti-democratic.

Fried differentiated herself from Crist, who has been a politician since his election to the Florida Senate in 1992, by taking the campaign slogan "Something New". She described Crist's former affiliation with the Republican Party and criticized him for his support for tough-on-crime legislation throughout his career. Fried blamed Crist for creating Florida's contemporary unemployment system, which collapsed during the COVID-19 pandemic; however, the system was not created by Crist, but by his gubernatorial successor Rick Scott.

== Chair of Florida Democratic Party ==
Fried was elected chair of the Florida Democratic Party in February 2023, defeating former state senator Annette Taddeo.

On April 3, 2023, Fried was arrested alongside Lauren Book, the minority leader of the Florida Senate, following a protest of an anti-abortion bill being considered by state lawmakers. The bill would ban abortions after six weeks. Fried and ten others were arrested for trespassing after the Tallahassee Police Department instructed them to disperse by sunset, which they did not do.

Fried was reelected as chair in January 2025.

== Electoral history ==
Democratic primary results for 2018 Florida commissioner of agriculture
Party	Candidate	Votes	%
Democratic	Nikki Fried	826,009	58.6
Democratic	R. David Walker	359,081	25.5
Democratic	Jeff Porter	223,299	15.9
Total votes		1,408,389	100.0

2018 Florida commissioner of agriculture election results
Party	Candidate	Votes	%	±%
Democratic	Nikki Fried	4,032,954	50.04%	+0.08%
Republican	Matt Caldwell	4,026,201	49.96%	−0.08%
Total votes		8,059,155	100.00%	N/A
Democratic gain from Republican				

Democratic primary results for 2022 Florida governor
Party	Candidate	Votes	%
Democratic	Charlie Crist	904,524	59.7
Democratic	Nikki Fried	535,480	35.3
Democratic	Cadance Daniel	38,198	2.5
Democratic	Robert L. Willis	36,786	2.4
Total votes		1,514,988	100.0

== Personal life ==
Fried is vocal about her practice of Judaism. While in high school, she was a participant in B'nai B'rith, a Jewish service organization. Fried also actively considered making aliyah to Israel and joining the Israel Defense Forces. After her election as agriculture commissioner, Fried was sworn into office using the first Hebrew Bible published in the United States.

Fried is a registered medical marijuana cardholder in the state of Florida. In 2023 she was named to the board of directors of the National Organization for the Reform of Marijuana Laws (NORML).

=== Relationship with Jake Bergmann ===
Fried's fiancé, Jake Bergmann, is a prominent marijuana entrepreneur in Florida. Her relationship with him has been criticized as a conflict of interest, as Bergmann's business often results in dealings with the Florida Department of Agriculture.

In June 2020, Fried and Bergmann engaged in a verbal argument at a hotel in Fort Lauderdale resulting from a car accident in the hotel's parking lot. A security guard who witnessed the incident claimed Bergmann threw a trash can and shoved Fried, though Fried denies the latter. Fort Lauderdale Police Department escorted Bergmann off the property and a formal police report was filed; no arrest was made. Following the incident, Fried denied Bergmann was physically abusive to her and replaced a number of high-level staffers who criticized him.

Party political offices
Preceded by Thad Hamilton	Democratic nominee for Agriculture Commissioner of Florida; 2018	Succeeded by Naomi Blemur
Preceded by Elizabeth Warren	Keynote Speaker of the Democratic National Convention; 2020; Served alongside: Stacey Abrams, Raumesh Akbari, Colin Allred, Brendan Boyle, Yvanna Cancela, Kathleen Clyde, Robert Garcia, Malcolm Kenyatta, Marlon Kimpson, Conor Lamb, Mari Manoogian, Victoria Neave, Jonathan Nez, Sam Park, Denny Ruprecht, Randall Woodfin	Succeeded by Angela Alsobrooks
Preceded by Judy Mount; Acting	Chair of the Florida Democratic Party; 2023–present	Incumbent
Political offices
Preceded by Adam Putnam	Agriculture Commissioner of Florida; 2019–2023	Succeeded by Wilton Simpson
