= E. L. D. Overstreet =

American politician

Member of the Florida House of Representatives from Osceola County
- In office 1891

Personal details
- Born: February 7, 1851 Bainbridge, Georgia
- Died: December 25, 1942 (aged 91)
- Relatives: Irlo Bronson Sr. (maternal grandson); Irlo Bronson Jr. (great-grandson)

E. L. D. Overstreet (February 7, 1851 – December 25, 1942), also known as Uncle Ed, was an American politician. He served as a member of the Florida House of Representatives.

== Life and career ==
Overstreet was born in Bainbridge, Georgia.

Overstreet served in the Florida House of Representatives in 1891.

Overstreet died on December 25, 1942, at the age of 91.
