= Florida's 76th House of Representatives district =

Florida district

Florida's 76th State House of Representatives district
Representative
Vanessa Oliver; R–North Fort Myers

Florida's 76th House of Representatives district elects one member of the Florida House of Representatives. It contains DeSoto County, and parts of Charlotte County and Lee County.

== Members ==
- Chuck Nergard (1972–1976)
- Dale Cassens (1977–1978)
- Chuck Nergard (1978–1982)
- Bert J. Harris Jr. (1982–1992)
- Mary Ellen Hawkins (1992–1994)
- Burt Saunders (1995–1999)
- J. Dudley Goodlette (1999–2007)
- Garrett Richter (2006–2008)
- Tom Grady (2008–2010)
- Kathleen Passidomo (2010–2012)
- Ray Rodrigues (2012–2020)
- Adam Botana (2020–2022)
- Spencer Roach (2022–2024)
- Vanessa Oliver (since 2024)
