= Matt Caldwell =

American politician (born 1981)

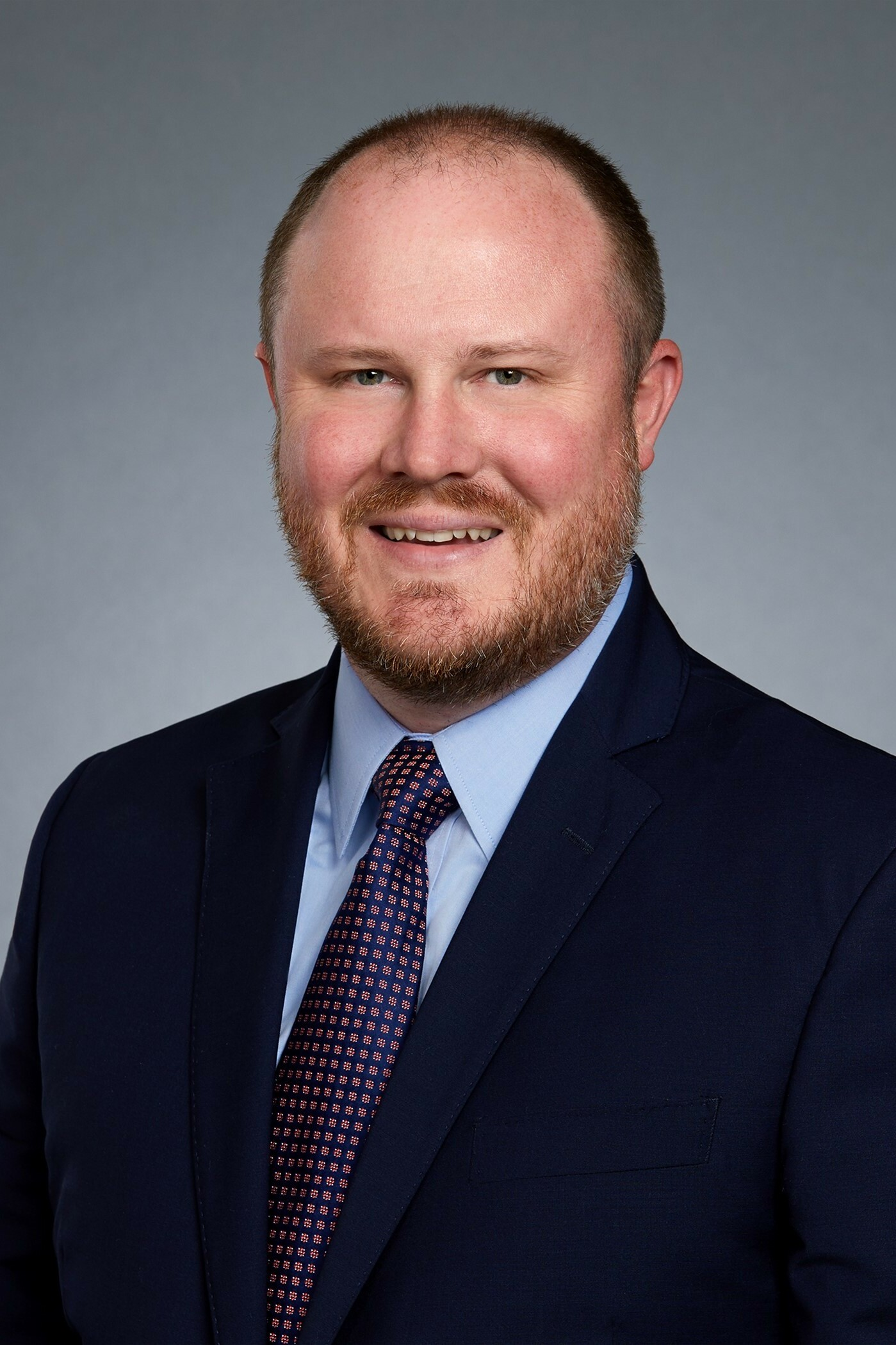

Lee County Property Appraiser
- Incumbent
- Assumed office 2020
- Preceded by: Ken Wilkinson

Member of the Florida House of Representatives from the 73rd district
- In office November 2, 2010 – November 6, 2012
- Preceded by: Nick Thompson
- Succeeded by: Greg Steube

Member of the Florida House of Representatives from the 79th district
- In office November 6, 2012 – November 6, 2018
- Preceded by: Mike Horner
- Succeeded by: Spencer Roach

Personal details
- Born: August 12, 1981 (age 44) Gainesville, Florida, U.S.
- Party: Republican
- Education: Florida SouthWestern State College (AA); Florida Gulf Coast University (BA); University of Florida (MS)

Matthew H. Caldwell (born August 12, 1981) is an American Republican politician and a former member of the Florida House of Representatives from 2010 to 2018. Caldwell was the Republican nominee for Florida Commissioner of Agriculture in 2018. He has served the elected Lee County Property Appraiser since 2020.

Caldwell was the Republican nominee for Florida Commissioner of Agriculture in 2018, but lost the general election to Democrat Nikki Fried.

== History ==
Caldwell is a 7th generation Florida native whose family came to Micanopy in 1826. Matt attended Florida Gulf Coast University, from which he received a degree in history in 2004. Matt later received a Master of Science in Forestry Resources and Conservation with a concentration in Geomatics from the University of Florida. He works as a real estate appraiser and consultant with Maxwell, Hendry, Simmons in Fort Myers, having attained the highest state certification in his field and being qualified as an expert witness in multiple states and federal court. Matt was a member of the Florida House of Representatives from 2010 to 2018, serving on and chairing several committees during his tenure, including tax policy, redistricting, insurance and banking, agriculture, natural resources and public lands, transportation and infrastructure, local, federal, and military affairs, & oversight of government operations, such as pensions & elections.

== Campaign history ==
=== 2008 ===
In 2008, when Democratic State Senator Dave Aronberg ran for re-election in the 27th District, which sprawled from West Palm Beach to Cape Coral and included parts of Charlotte County, Glades County, Lee County, and Palm Beach County, Caldwell ran against him. He won the uncontested Republican primary and advanced to the general election. Ultimately, Caldwell won only 39% of the vote to Aronberg's 59% and Green Party candidate Aniana Robas's 2%.

=== 2010 ===
When incumbent State Representative Nick Thompson opted to run for a position as a Circuit Judge on the 20th Judicial Circuit of Florida in 2010 rather than seek re-election, Caldwell ran to succeed him in the 73rd District, based in northern Lee County, including Fort Myers and stretching from Suncoast Estates to Gateway. He faced Jason Moon, John Schultz, and Deanna Casalino in the Republican primary. Caldwell was able to narrowly defeat his opponents to win his party's nomination, receiving 35% of the vote to Moon's 29%, Schultz's 27%, and Casalino's 8%, and he advanced to the general election, where he was opposed by Democratic nominee Cole Peacock and Tea Party candidate Pantoja Rodriguez in the general election. In the end, Caldwell defeated both of his opponents, winning 59% of the vote to Peacock's 38% and Rodriguez's 3%.

=== 2012 ===
When state legislative districts were redrawn in 2012, Caldwell was moved into the 79th District, which retained most of the territory that he had previously represented in the 73rd District. In the Republican primary, he was opposed by Jon Larsen Shudlick, whom he was able to defeat in a landslide, winning re-nomination with 86% of the vote. He was unopposed in the general election and won his second term in the legislature uncontested.

=== 2014 ===
Caldwell again ran for District 79 in 2014. In the Republican primary he faced opponent Matt Miller. Caldwell was able to win the race with 60.6% to his opponents 39.4%. He did not have an opponent in the general election once again.

=== 2016 ===
In Caldwell's last race for the Florida House in 2016, he won 51% to Democratic candidate John W. Scotts 38% and Independent Matt Millers 10.6%.

=== 2018 ===
After terming out of the Florida House of Representatives, Caldwell ran for Agricultural Commissioner of Florida. In the Republican primary election, Caldwell won the party's nomination receiving 34% of the vote to Denise Grimsley's 26%, Mike McCalister's 12%, and Baxter Troutman's 26%. In the general election, Caldwell faced Democrat Nikki Fried. On election night, Caldwell appeared to be leading by a margin of more than 40,000 votes, but after the votes were fully counted, the margin was close enough that a recount was performed, and after that recount, he was narrowly defeated by 6,753 votes out of more than eight million cast.

=== 2020 ===
In 2020 Caldwell ran for Lee County Property Appraiser after Ken Wilkinson retired from his 40 year long tenure. In the Republican Primary he was opposed by Matt Miller and was able to move onto the General with 59% of the vote. In the General Election Caldwell faced only a write in candidate and was able to win the election with 96% of the vote. Also in 2020, Caldwell ran for State Committeeman for the Republican Party of Florida and was able to defeat the incumbent, Chris Crowley, with 54% of the vote.

Party political offices
| Preceded by Adam Putnam | Republican nominee for Florida Commissioner of Agriculture; 2018 | Succeeded by Wilton Simpson |
Florida House of Representatives
| Preceded by Nick Thompson | Member of the Florida House of Representatives from the 73rd district 2010–2012 | Succeeded by Greg Steube |
| Preceded by Mike Horner | Member of the Florida House of Representatives from the 79th district 2012–2018 | Succeeded by Spencer Roach |
