= Florida's 77th House of Representatives district =

Florida district

Florida's 77th State House of Representatives district
Representative
Tiffany Esposito; R–Fort Myers

Florida's 77th House of Representatives district elects one member of the Florida House of Representatives. It contains parts of Lee County.

== Members ==
- Bert J. Harris Jr. (1992–1996)
- Joe Spratt (1996–2004)
- Denise Grimsley (2004–2012)
- Dane Eagle (2012–2020)
- Mike Giallombardo (2020–2022)
- Tiffany Esposito (since 2022)
