= Florida's 79th House of Representatives district =

Florida district

Florida's 79th State House of Representatives district
Representative
Mike Giallombardo; R–Cape Coral

Florida's 79th House of Representatives district elects one member of the Florida House of Representatives. It contains parts of Lee County.

== Members ==
- Irlo Bronson Jr. (1992–2000)
- Frank Attkisson (2000–2008)
- Mike Horner (2008–2012)
- Matt Caldwell (2012–2018)
- Spencer Roach (2018–2022)
- Mike Giallombardo (since 2022)
