= Dane Eagle =

American politician (born 1983)

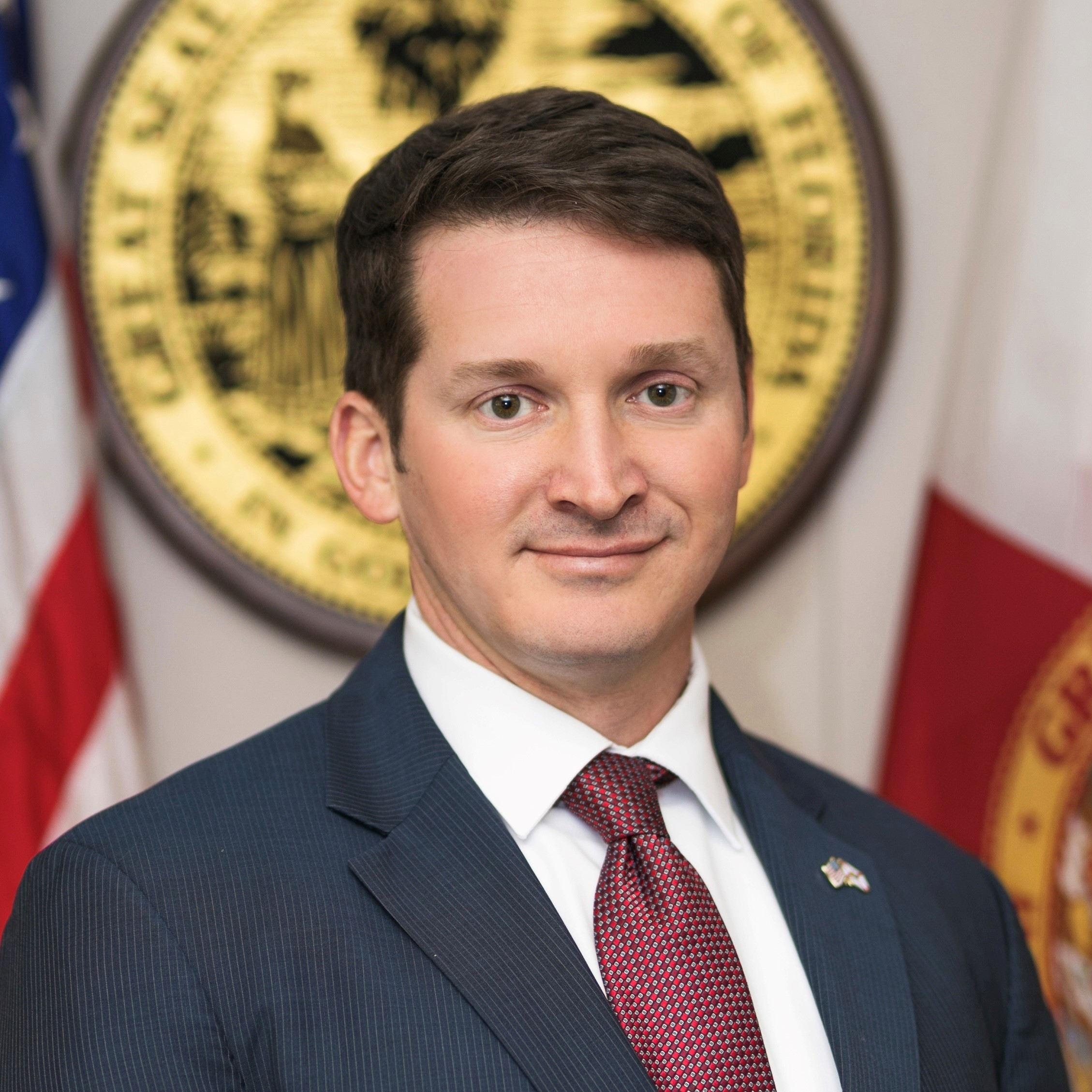

Secretary of the Florida Department of Economic Opportunity
- In office September 14, 2020 – December 30, 2022
- Governor: Ron DeSantis
- Preceded by: Ken Lawson

Majority Leader of the Florida House of Representatives
- In office November 19, 2018 – September 11, 2020
- Preceded by: Ray Rodrigues
- Succeeded by: Michael J. Grant

Member of the Florida House of Representatives from the 77th district
- In office November 6, 2012 – September 11, 2020
- Preceded by: Redistricted
- Succeeded by: Mike Giallombardo

Personal details
- Born: May 22, 1983 (age 43) Cape Coral, Florida, U.S.
- Party: Republican
- Education: Florida Gulf Coast University; University of Florida (BA)

Dane Eagle (born May 22, 1983) is an American politician from Florida. A Republican, Eagle was appointed by Governor Ron DeSantis as Secretary of the Florida Department of Economic Opportunity in September 2020, leaving that position in 2022. Eagle was a member of the Florida House of Representatives from 2012 to 2020, where he represented Cape Coral in Lee County and served as Majority Leader and Majority Whip. Eagle resigned from the House to accept his appointment as head of DEO. Eagle unsuccessfully sought the Republican nomination for Congress in Florida's 19th congressional district in the 2020 election.

== Early life and education ==
Eagle was born in Cape Coral, Florida, on May 22, 1983. He is the son of Greg Eagle. He received an associate degree from Florida Gulf Coast University in 2003. He received a bachelor's degree in economics from the University of Florida in 2005.

== Crist administration ==
He began his political career as an aide to Florida Governor Charlie Crist, then a Republican. He started as a travel aide to Crist during the latter's 2006 gubernatorial campaign. After Crist won the election, Eagle became "special assistant to the governor" before being elevated to deputy chief of staff. As finance director for Crist's 2010 Senate campaign, Eagle was responsible for fundraising for the campaign. After Crist dropped out of the Republican primary election to become an independent, Eagle and Crist split. (Crist later became a Democratic member of the U.S. House of Representatives.

== Florida House of Representatives (2012–2020) ==
=== 2012 election ===
Eagle won election to the Florida House of Representatives in 2012, at age 29. Following the reconfiguration of Florida House districts, Eagle opted to run in the newly created 77th District, a southwestern Florida district based in Cape Coral. In the 2012 Republican primary, Eagle defeated former Cape Coral City Councilman Chris Berardi, winning 10,026 votes (70.6%) to Berardi's 4,183 votes (29.4%). In the 2012 general election, Eagle defeated Democratic nominee Arvella M. Clare to win his first term in the legislature; Eagle received 38,936 votes (62.4%) to Clare's 23,455 votes (37.6%).

=== 2014 arrest ===
In April 2014, Eagle was arrested on suspicion of driving under the influence in Tallahassee, Florida after speeding, reckless driving and running a red light. According to police, Eagle had bloodshot eyes, was staggering and smelling of alcohol. Eagle claimed that the smell of alcohol coming from his vehicle was the result of having people who were drunk in his car earlier in the night. He refused to take a roadside sobriety test or a breath alcohol test. In May 2014, Eagle issued an apology, saying that "I do not dispute that I am guilty of driving recklessly and using poor judgment" but denied being drunk at the time of his arrest.

Days after his arrest, Eagle resigned from his position as director of development for the Lee County Building Industry Association, a position he had taken up a year earlier. Eagle said the timing was coincidental. In June 2014, the charge against Eagle was dropped to reckless driving; he took a plea deal in which he pleaded no contest and agreed to six months' probation, 100 hours' community service, and alcohol testing.

Eagle's conduct was criticized by The News-Press, which said that Eagle "has disappointed his constituency and embarrassed himself" and questioning Eagle's claim to not have been drinking. Nevertheless, the News-Press went on to endorse Eagle for reelection later that year, stating, "We know he cares about his job. We know he is committed to serving the people here. He was apologetic for his mistake and says he has learned from it. Only time and his actions will make that true."

=== Reelections in 2014 and 2018 ===
In 2014, Eagle won the four-way Republican primary with 64% of the vote. In the general election, he faced only a write-in candidate. In 2016, Eagle ran unopposed through both the Republican primary and the general election, winning his third term in the State House of Representatives. In 2018, he won reelection, defeating Democratic candidate Alanis Garcia with 63% of the vote.

=== Tenure as majority whip and majority leader; Trump support ===
Eagle was the state House majority whip from 2016 to 2018, and majority leader from 2018 to 2020, leading the Republican caucus in the Republican-dominated chamber alongside Speaker José R. Oliva. Eagle was also vice-chair of the House Appropriations Committee from 2018 to 2020, a powerful post. During his time in the state House, Eagle supported "campus carry" legislation (to allow the concealed carrying of guns on college campuses) and "open carry" legislation (to legalize the open carrying of guns in public spaces). He also sponsored legislation that would ban "state, county, or city law enforcement officers from enforcing existing or future federal regulations on personal firearms and ammunition." Eagle is a supporter of Donald Trump; he was one of the opening speakers at a Trump rally at Germain Arena near Fort Myers in September 2016, ahead of the November 2016 presidential election. In a two-minute video announcing his candidacy for the Republican nomination for a congressional seat in 2019, Eagle invoked Trump or "the president" eight times.

== 2020 U.S. House campaign ==
Eagle could not seek reelection to the Florida House in 2020 due to term limits. He announced his bid for the Republican nomination for Florida's 19th congressional district in the 2020 U.S. House elections, to replace retiring incumbent Francis Rooney. The heavily Republican district covers parts of Collier and Lee counties. Eagle lost the Republican primary in August 2020, coming in second place to fellow State Representative Byron Donalds, 22.6 to 21.9%. Eagle lost by 777 votes.

== DeSantis administration ==
In September 2020, Governor Ron DeSantis appointed Eagle to the post of executive director of the state Department of Economic Opportunity. The long-troubled state DEO oversees the Florida unemployment insurance system. The department faced a backlog in processing unemployment insurance claims. The department brought more call centers online in 2020, but shut down all but one of the call centers in mid-2021. Critics called the decision premature, given the persistent backlog of claims and the failure of CONNECT, the state's antiqued online system, to effectively facilitate claims. Under Eagle, the state tightened requirements for workers to receive benefits. In May 2021, DeSantis and Eagle also withdrew Florida from the federal Pandemic Unemployment Assistance program, which offered a $300 weekly increase to state unemployment benefits.

Florida House of Representatives
Preceded by Denise Grimsley	Member of the Florida House of Representatives from the 77th district 2012–2020	Succeeded by Mike Giallombardo
Preceded by Ray Rodrigues	Majority Leader of the Florida House of Representatives; 2018–2020	Succeeded by Michael J. Grant
