= 2015 Orlando mayoral election =

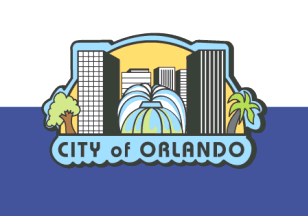
- November 3, 2015
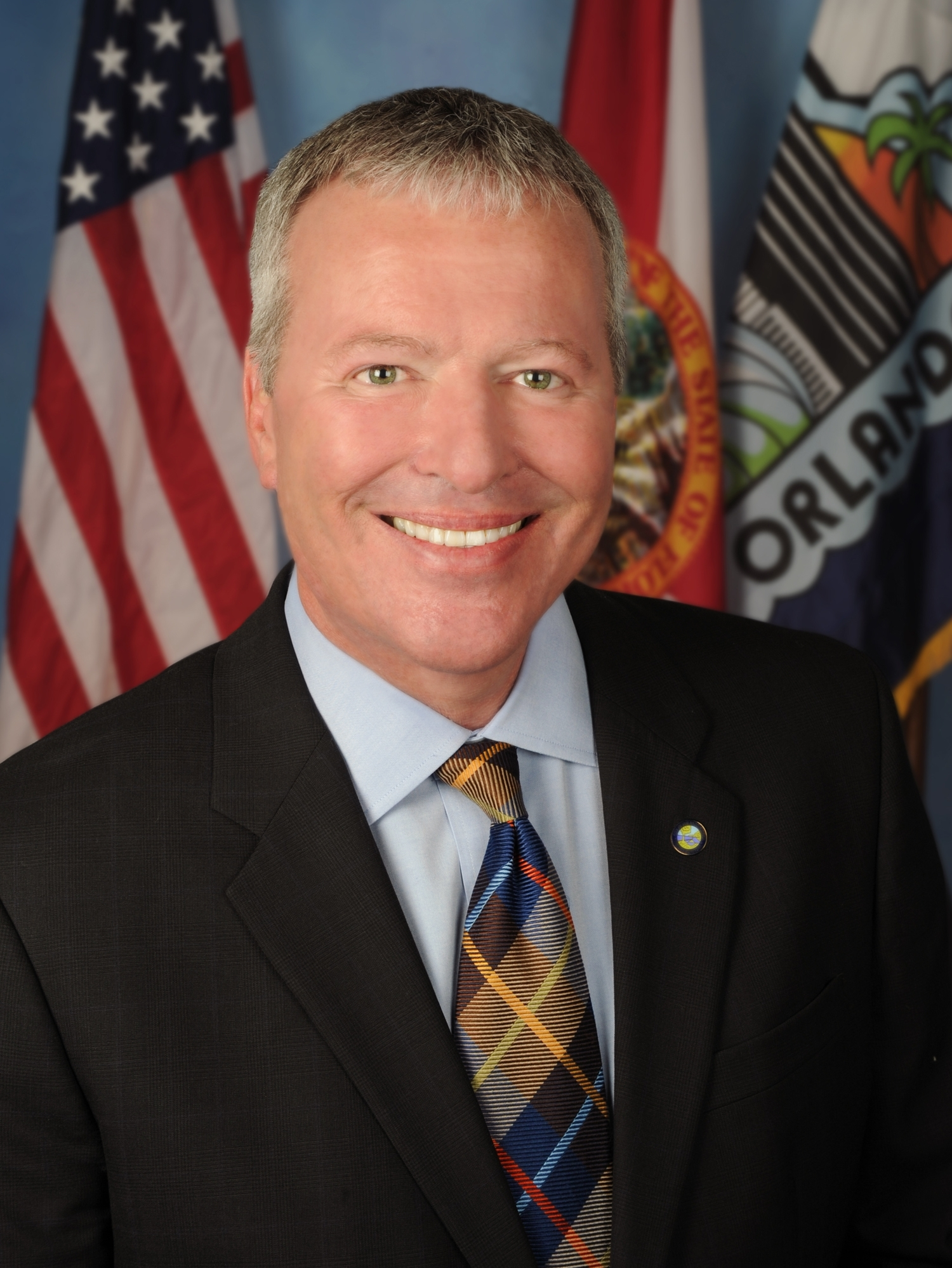

Candidate	Buddy Dyer	Paul Paulson
Party	Nonpartisan	Nonpartisan
Popular vote	13,953	7,383
Percentage	62.53%	33.09%
Mayor before election
Buddy Dyer
Nonpartisan
Elected mayor
Buddy Dyer
Nonpartisan

The 2015 Orlando mayoral election took place on November 3, 2015. The election was originally scheduled for 2016, but following a shift in the schedule for the presidential primary, the City Council shifted municipal elections to November of odd-numbered years.

Incumbent Mayor Buddy Dyer ran for re-election to a fourth full term. He was challenged by businessman Paul Paulson and student Linda "Sunshine" Grund. Paulson waged a serious campaign against Dyer, loaning himself $800,000 and outspending Dyer's campaign.

Though the race was formally nonpartisan, Paulson sent mailers to registered Republican voters identifying himself as a Republican candidate in violation of state election law, which he apologized for. Paulson simultaneously sent mailers to registered Democrats attacking Dyer for not endorsing Democratic nominee Charlie Crist in the 2014 gubernatorial election.

Dyer ultimately won re-election in a landslide, receiving 63 percent of the vote to Paulson's 33 percent and Grund's 4 percent.

== General election ==
=== Candidates ===
- Buddy Dyer, incumbent Mayor
- Paul Paulson, business executive and veteran
- Linda "Sunshine" Grund, student

=== Results ===
2015 Orlando mayoral election results
Party	Candidate	Votes	%
Nonpartisan	Buddy Dyer (inc.)	13,953	62.53%
Nonpartisan	Paul Paulson	7,383	33.09%
Nonpartisan	Linda Grund	979	4.39%
Total votes		22,315	100.00%
