= Mike Giallombardo =

American politician (born 1982)

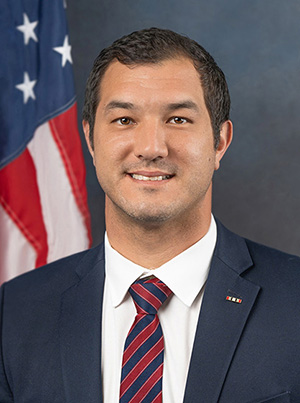

Member of the Florida House of Representatives
- Incumbent
- Assumed office November 3, 2020
- Preceded by: Dane Eagle
- Constituency: 77th district (2020–2022); 79th district (2022–present)

Personal details
- Born: 1982 (age 43–44)
- Party: Republican
- Spouse: Wendi Giallombardo
- Children: 3
- Education: Georgia Military College (AS); Florida Atlantic University (BA); American Military University (MA)

Military service
- Branch/service: United States Army
- Unit: Florida Army National Guard
- Battles/wars: Iraq War

Mike Giallombardo (born October 1982) is an American politician, businessman, and current Chief Warrant Officer (CW2) serving as a member of the Florida House of Representatives from the 79th district. He assumed office on November 3, 2020.

== Early life and education ==
Representative Giallombardo was raised in Cape Coral, Florida. He earned an Associate of Science degree from Georgia Military College, a Bachelor of Arts in Criminal Justice from Florida Atlantic University, and a Master of Arts in International Relations from American Military University. As an undergraduate, Giallombardo was a middle linebacker for the Florida Atlantic Owls football team under coach Howard Schnellenberger.

== Military career ==
After college, Representative Giallombardo enlisted in the United States Army and was deployed to Iraq in support of Operation Iraqi Freedom. During his deployment, he served with the 4th Infantry Division and supported special operation missions. Representative Giallambardo played a significant role as a liaison to the Iraqi military and other coalition forces supporting the counter insurgency effort in Iraq. Mike is highly decorated from operations he took part in and was awarded numerous medals including the Army Commendation and Army Achievement Medals for his operational roles in Iraq that led to capturing various targets.

After leaving active duty, Representative Giallombardo continued his service in the and Florida Army National Guard. Representative Giallombardo is currently a Chief Warrant Officer (CW2) and serves as the State Emergency Response Team liaison for the State of Florida. He has been activated for multiple hurricanes working with multiple counties in ensuring that the citizens have support from the Florida National Guard.

== Political career ==
He was elected to the Florida House of Representatives in November 2020 and recently announced he will be seeking re-election in 2022 in the renamed 79th district. The 79th district was previously the 77th district, which primarily encompasses the city of Cape Coral, Florida. He currently is assigned to the following committees:

- Regulatory Reform Subcommittee - Vice Chair
- Pandemics & Public Emergencies Committee
- State Affairs Committee
- Local Administration & Veterans Affairs Subcommittee
- Insurance & Banking Subcommittee
- State Administration & Technology Appropriations Subcommittee

Representative Giallombardo has sponsored or co-sponsored the following bills:

2022 Session
Bill #	Bill Subject		Bill #	Bill Subject	
HB 17	Telehealth Practice Standards	Sponsor	CS/HB 5	Reducing Fetal and Infant Mortality	Co-Sponsor
CS/CS/CS/HB 309	Private Provider Inspections of Onsite Sewage Treatment and Disposal Systems	Sponsor	HJR 35	Partisan Elections for Members of District School Boards	Co-Sponsor
CS/HB 403	Local Ordinances	Sponsor	HB 497	Lee County School District, Lee County	Co-Sponsor
CS/HB 689	Workers' Compensation Benefits for Posttraumatic Stress Disorder	Sponsor	CS/CS/HB 569	Local Business Protection Act	Co-Sponsor
HB 1147	Critical Infrastructure Standards and Procedures	Sponsor	CS/CS/HB 987	In-person Visitation	Co-Sponsor
HB 1149	Surplus Lines Tax on Flood Insurance Premiums	Sponsor	CS/HB 1355	Immigration Enforcement	Co-Sponsor
CS/CS/HB 1307	Citizens Property Insurance Corporation	Sponsor	HB 1469	Transportation Facility Designations	Co-Sponsor
HB 1437	The Hope Scholarship Program	Sponsor	HR 1597	Ukraine	Co-Sponsor
CS/CS/HB 1443	OGSR/Dependent Eligibility Information/DMS	Sponsor	HR 8055	Holodomor Remembrance Day	Co-Sponsor
CS/CS/HB 1445	OGSR/Dependent Eligibility Information/DMS	Sponsor			
CS/HB 1447	Apprenticeship Tax Credits	Sponsor			
HB 4621	Lee County Emergency Operations Center Expansion	Sponsor			
HB 4623	Cape Coral Caloosahatchee River Crossing Project	Sponsor			
HB 4625	Home Base Florida Veteran and Family Care	Sponsor			
HB 4627	Vets in Class - Guest Lecturer to Substitute Teacher Pilot Program	Sponsor			
HB 4629	Cape Coral Ecological Preserve Boardwalk Replacement	Sponsor			
HB 4631	Cape Coral Northeast Reservoir Project	Sponsor			
HB 4633	Cape Coral North Wellfield Expansion	Sponsor			
CS/HB 7055	Cybersecurity	Sponsor			
CS/HB 7057	Pub. Rec. and Meetings/Cybersecurity	Sponsor			
HB 9241	Cyber Florida - Local Government Infrastructure and Technical Assistance	Sponsor			

2021 Session
Bill #	Bill Subject		Bill #	Bill Subject	
CS/HB 163	POW-MIA Vietnam Veterans Bracelet Memorial	Sponsor	CS/HB 1	Combating Public Disorder	Co-Sponsor
CS/HB 247	Telehealth Practice Standards	Sponsor	CS/HB 7	Civil Liability for Damages Relating to COVID-19	Co-Sponsor
CS/HB 379	Pub. Rec./Economic Development Agencies	Sponsor	CS/HB 9	Protecting Consumers Against Pandemic-related Fraud	Co-Sponsor
CS/HB 403	Home-based Businesses	Sponsor	HM 71	Recognizing Veteran Suicide	Co-Sponsor
CS/HB 873	Military Affairs	Sponsor	CS/CS/HB 209	Big Cypress Basin	Co-Sponsor
CS/CS/HB 1049	Use of Drones by Government Agencies	Sponsor	HB 217	Conservation Area Designations	Co-Sponsor
CS/CS/HB 1297	Cybersecurity	Sponsor	CS/CS/HB 279	Enhanced Penalties for Criminal Offenses	Co-Sponsor
CS/HB 1305	Workers' Compensation Insurance for Employee Leasing Companies	Sponsor	CS/CS/HB 313	Firefighter Inquiries and Investigations	Co-Sponsor
HB 2591	Four Laning Ortiz Avenue	Sponsor	HB 351	Protection of a Pain-capable Unborn Child from Abortion	Co-Sponsor
HB 2643	City of Cape Coral Real-Time Crime Center	Sponsor	CS/CS/CS/HB 727	Wildlife Corridors	Co-Sponsor
HB 2655	Lee County Deep Lagoon Preserve Water Quality Improvement Project	Sponsor	HB 735	Preemption of Local Occupational Licensing	Co-Sponsor
HB 2657	Cape Coral Reservoir and Pipeline Project	Sponsor	CS/CS/HB 919	Preemption Over Restriction of Utility Services	Co-Sponsor
HB 2659	Cape Coral Caloosahatchee Reclaimed Water Transmission Main	Sponsor	CS/HB 1029	Purple Heart Recipient Parking Spaces	Co-Sponsor
HB 2707	Oasis Charter Schools STEM MakerSpace Initiative	Sponsor	HM 1301	Second Amendment to the Constitution of the United States	Co-Sponsor
HB 2857	Lehigh Acres Municipal Services Improvement District Caloosahatchee River & Estuaries Storage & Treatment Phase II	Sponsor	HB 1409	Preemption of Firearms and Ammunition Regulation	Co-Sponsor
HB 7Bv	Vaccinations During Public Health Emergencies		CS/HB 1475	Sex-specific Student Athletic Teams or Sports	Co-Sponsor
			CS/CS/CS/HB 1507	Workforce Related Programs and Services	Co-Sponsor
			HB 7009	OGSR/Juvenile Criminal History Records	Co-Sponsor

== Business career ==
In 2014, he founded Total Intelligence Group, Inc., a private intelligence firm that focuses on cybersecurity. In 2020, he co-founded IRIS Tech along with Army Veterans Tim Masshardt and Jason Shea. IRIS Tech is responsible for the creation of the IRIS platform currently being used by law enforcement agencies throughout the United States.
