= Dale Cassens =

American politician

K. Dale Cassens
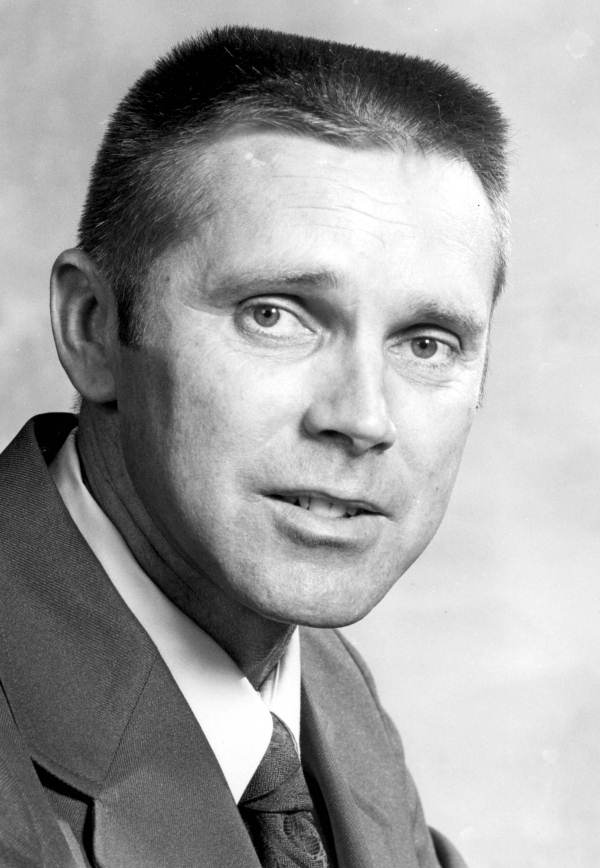
- Cassens in 1976

Member of the Florida House of Representatives from the 76th district
- In office 1977–1978

Personal details
- Born: April 8, 1935 Fort Pierce, Florida, U.S.
- Died: December 17, 1987 (aged 52) Fort Pierce, Florida, U.S.
- Party: Democratic
- Education: University of Florida
- Occupation: Citrus grower, Retailer, Wholesaler

Kenneth Dale Cassens (April 8, 1935 – December 17, 1987) was an American politician and school board member in the state of Florida.

Cassens was born in Fort Pierce, Florida, in 1935. A citrus farmer and businessman, he is an alumnus of the University of Florida, where he earned a Bachelor of Science degree in agriculture in 1957. He served in the Florida House of Representatives from 1977 to 1978, as a Democrat, representing the 76th district.

The Dale Cassens Exceptional Students Education Center in Fort Pierce, Florida was named in his honor. DCEC is a unique school that is designed to meet the individual needs of each student. Students volunteer to attend DCEC to achieve their educational goals, to earn credits toward graduation, to learn how to manage behavior as society expects, and to pursue their life-long goals.

Dale and his brother Rudolph worked together to build a family cabin in the North Georgia mountains. Rudolph was quoted as saying that it was one of his greatest joys. Dale Cassens died of a heart attack in 1987. He was 52 years old.
