= List of Florida Gulf Coast University alumni =

This list of Florida Gulf Coast University alumni includes current students, former students, and graduates of the Florida Gulf Coast University in Fort Myers, Florida.

Alumni status is open to all graduates of Florida Gulf Coast University faculty, all former students of the Florida Gulf Coast University who regularly matriculated and left the university in good standing. Former athletes earning notable non-sports related distinctions should be added to this list.

== Athletics ==
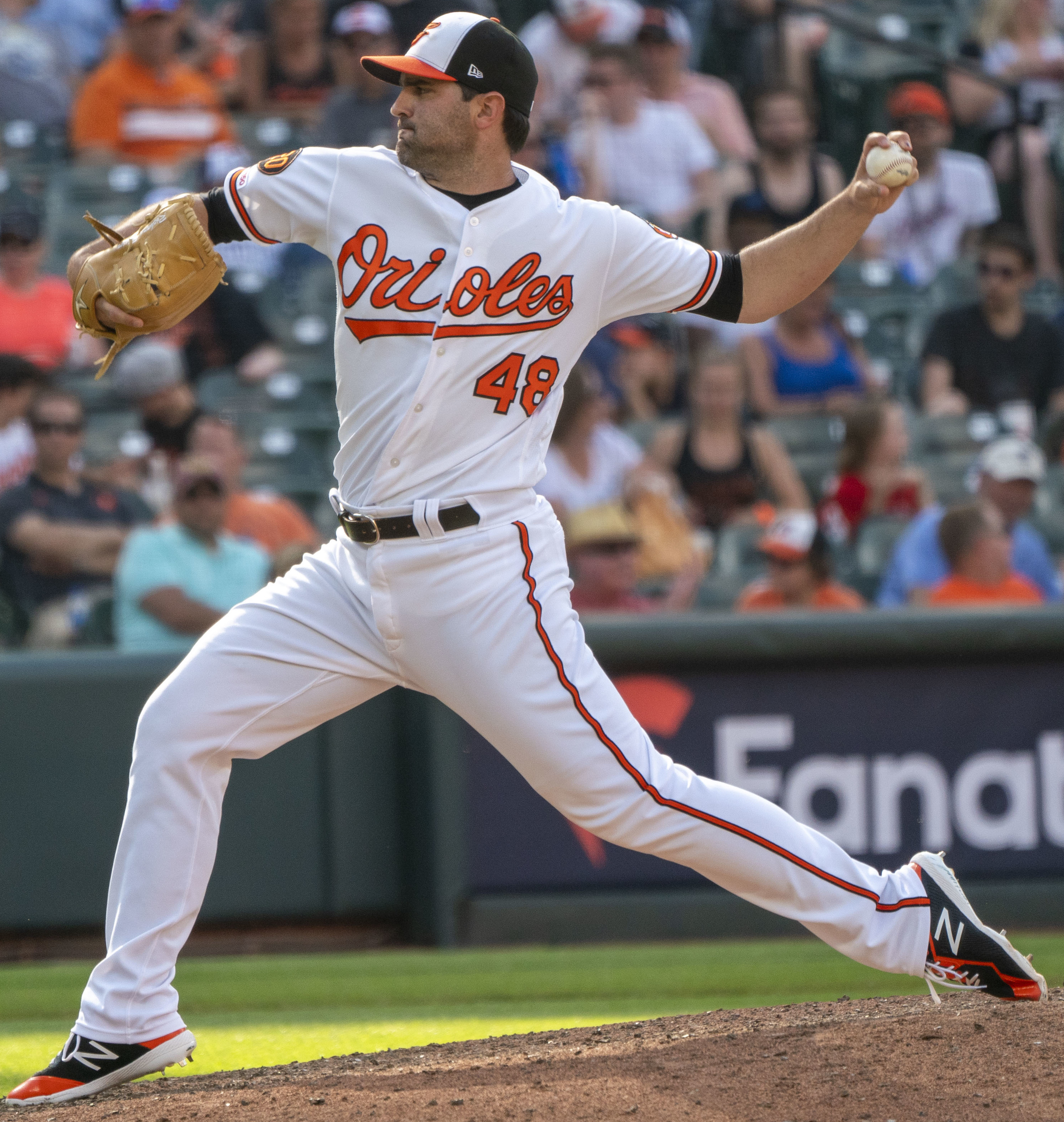
Richard Bleier

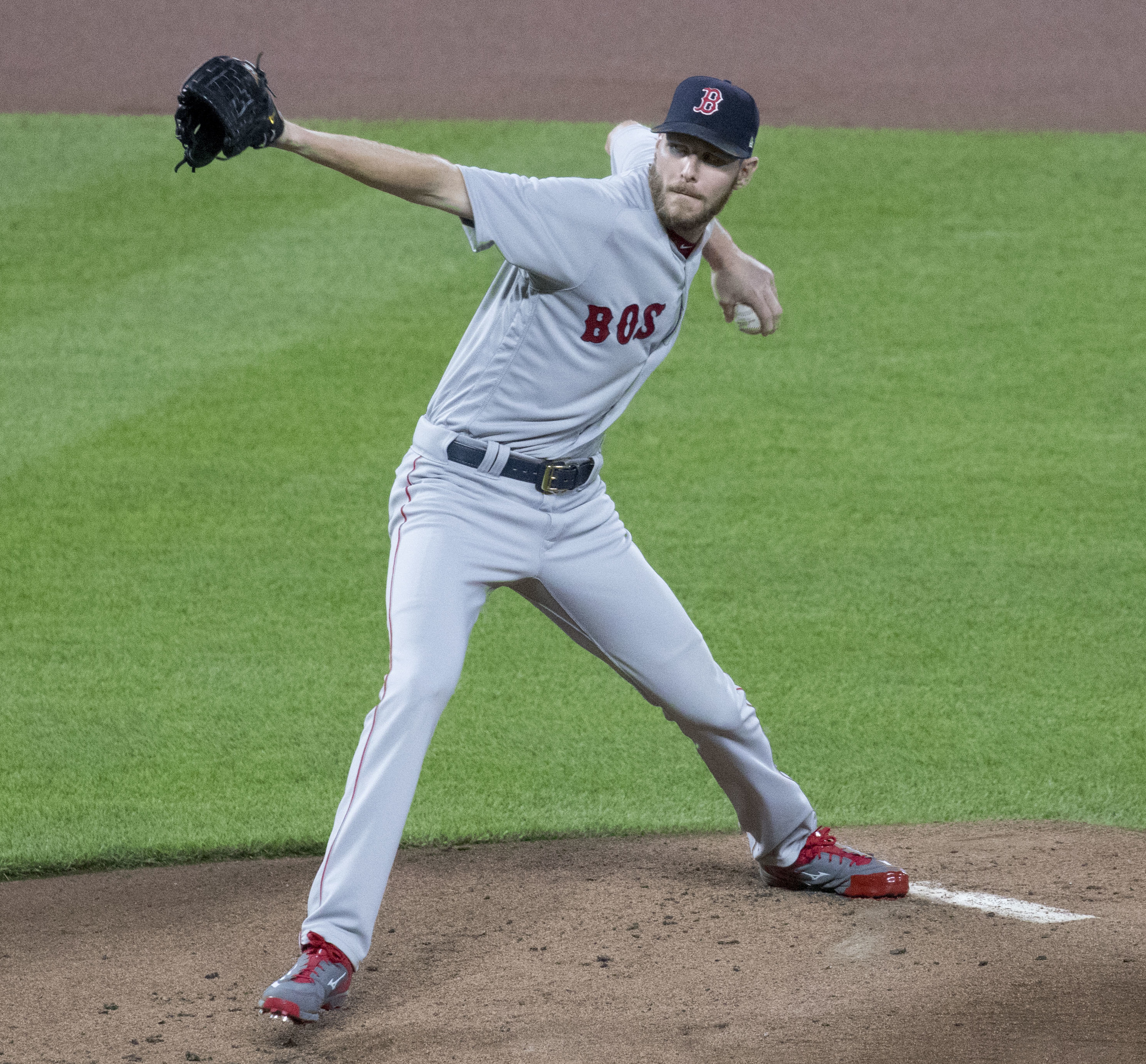
Chris Sale

- Eli Abaev, professional basketball player
- Kierstan Bell, WNBA player for the Las Vegas Aces
- Richard Bleier, Major League Baseball pitcher for the Boston Red Sox and Team Israel
- Sherwood Brown, professional basketball player
- Don Carman, retired Major League Baseball pitcher for the Philadelphia Phillies
- Sha Carter, professional basketball player
- Ross Chastain, NASCAR driver for the Trackhouse Racing Team
- Casey Coleman, professional baseball player for the Conspiradores de Querétaro
- Chase Fieler, professional basketball player
- Brandon Goodwin, professional basketball player
- Courtney Jolly, former professional monster truck driver
- Derek Lamely, professional golfer on the PGA Tour
- Chris Sale, Major League Baseball pitcher for the Atlanta Braves

== Politicians ==
- Matt Caldwell, member of the Florida House of Representatives for District 79 since 2011
- Dane Eagle, member of the Florida House of Representatives for District 77 since 2013
- William Snyder, former member of the Florida House of Representatives for District 82 and sheriff of Martin County
