= Aysegul Timur =

President of Florida Gulf Coast University, U.S.

5th President of Florida Gulf Coast University
- Incumbent
- Assumed office July 1, 2023
- Preceded by: Michael V. Martin

Personal details
- Born: Turkey
- Education: Istanbul University (BSBA, MBA); University of South Florida (PhD)

Aysegul Timur is a Turkish American academic administrator who serves as the 5th president of Florida Gulf Coast University. She is the first woman and first immigrant to become president in the university's history. She lives in Naples, Florida.

== Life and career ==
A native of Turkey, Timur holds bachelor's and master's degrees from Istanbul University and a PhD from the University of South Florida, all in business administration. She used to serve as vice president of strategy and program innovation at FGCU (2019–2023), dean of the Johnson School of Business at Hodges University (2014–2017), and senior vice president of academic affairs at Hodges University (2017–2019). She became president on July 1, 2023, succeeding Michael V. Martin, after a 7–6 vote by the FGCU Board of Trustees in May and a unanimous vote by the Florida Board of Governors in June 2023. She narrowly beat out finalist Henry Mack, senior chancellor at the Florida Department of Education and ally of Governor Ron DeSantis.
