= Florida Gulf Coast University =

Public university in Fort Myers, Florida, US

Coordinates: 26°27′45″N 81°46′22″W

- Other name: FGCU
- Motto: "Truth, Knowledge, Wisdom"
- Type: Public university
- Established: May 3, 1991; 35 years ago
- Parent institution: State University System of Florida
- Accreditation: SACS
- Academic affiliations: Space-grant
- Endowment: $129.3 million (2022)
- Chairman: Blake Gable
- President: Aysegul Timur
- Provost: Mark Rieger
- Academic staff: 568 full-time, 295 part-time
- Students: 16,612 (fall 2024)
- Undergraduates: 14,463 (fall 2024)
- Postgraduates: 2,149 (fall 2024)
- Location: Fort Myers, Florida address, United States
- Campus: 800 acres (320 ha); Large suburb
- Media: Eagle Media
- Colors: Cobalt blue and emerald green
- Nickname: Eagles
- Sporting affiliations: NCAA Division I – ASUN
- Mascot: Azul the Eagle
- Website: fgcu.edu

- Location of FGCU Florida Gulf Coast University (the United States)

Florida Gulf Coast University (FGCU) is a public university in Lee County, Florida, United States. Located near Fort Myers, it is part of the State University System of Florida and is its second-youngest member. The university was established on May 3, 1991, and is accredited by the Southern Association of Colleges and Schools (SACS). It offers 65 bachelor's degree programs, 27 master's degree programs, 7 doctoral degree programs, and 19 academic certificates.

FGCU's intercollegiate athletic teams, the Eagles, compete in the Atlantic Sun Conference (ASUN) in NCAA Division I sports.

== History ==
=== Establishment ===
In 1991, Charles B. Edwards, chair of the board of regents, lobbied the Florida Legislature to pass legislation recommending that Florida's 10th state university be built in the Florida Southwest Region. Florida governor Lawton Chiles signed the bill authorizing the school in May 1991.

The board of regents selected a 760-acre (310 ha) site in the south Fort Myers area donated by Ben Hill Griffin III on which to build the university. On April 26, 1993, Roy E. McTarnaghan, who served as the executive vice chancellor for the State University System of Florida, was appointed president of the yet-unnamed "New University of Southwest Florida". McTarnaghan and a small number of employees set up temporary base in downtown Fort Myers in a space provided by the Lee County Commission. The school commemorates August 25, 1997, as its commencement date, the first time classes were held on campus.

Academic Building 5 at Florida Gulf Coast University was later renamed Charles B. Edwards Hall, in honor of Edwards.

=== Expansion and growth ===
In July 1999, William C. Merwin became FGCU's second president. Merwin sought to create a traditional four-year university. An active fundraiser, Merwin raised more than $250 million for the university in eight years, rapidly expanding the school. New buildings included Lutgert College of Business, Holmes Hall (U.A. Whitaker School of Engineering), Whitaker Hall, Cohen Center (the student union), Alico Arena, and an expansion of on-campus housing. Student enrollment increased from approximately 2,000 in its first year to almost 15,000 as of 2017. In 2007, Wilson G. Bradshaw became the university's third president. Bradshaw announced that he would step down after the 2016–17 academic year, and the Board of Trustees selected Michael V. Martin as his successor.

Responding to a challenge for state universities to improve their four-year graduation rate, FGCU in 2016 introduced a program, Soar in 4, that reimburses out-of-pocket tuition expenses for the freshman year of students who graduate within four years and meet certain other criteria.

Martin, a former chancellor of Louisiana State University and the Colorado State University System, succeeded Bradshaw as Florida Gulf Coast University president on July 1, 2017. The transition from Bradshaw to Martin came during the university's celebration of its 20th anniversary.

In 2017, the College of Health Professions & Social Work was renamed the Marieb College of Health & Human Services after a $10 million gift from donor Elaine Nicpon Marieb, for whom Marieb Hall was named after her original $5 million pledge.

In June 2023, the Board of Trustees selected Aysegul Timur as FGCU's fifth president, making her the first woman president in the university's history. Timur took office on July 1, 2023.

=== Main campus ===
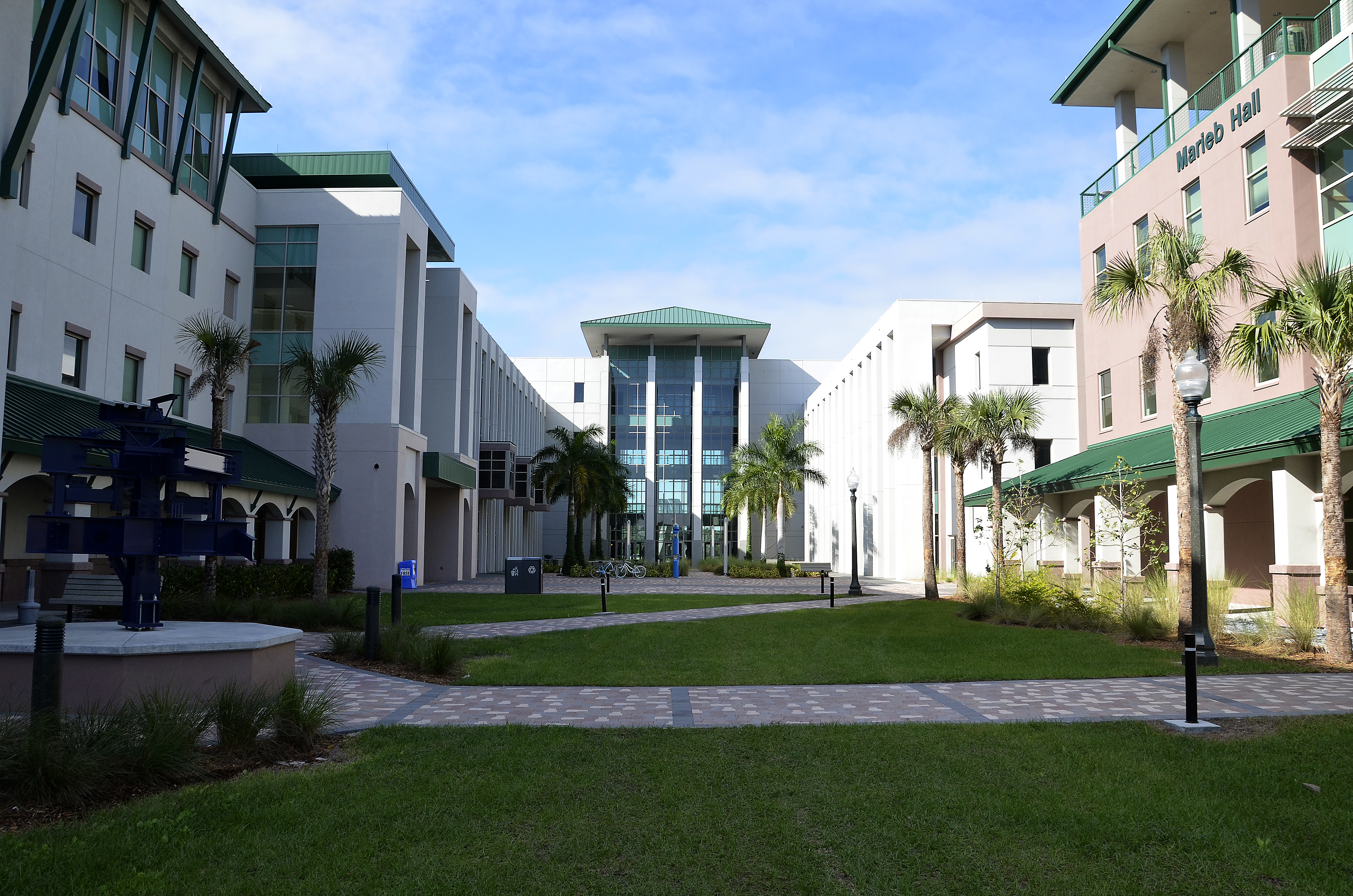
FGCU main campus

FGCU's 807-acre (3.27 km^{2}) campus is in unincorporated Southwest Florida in Lee County, 21 mi (34 km) from Naples and south of Fort Myers. It is within San Carlos Park's fire district and has a Fort Myers postal code.

The 150-acre (0.61 km^{2}) center of the campus, known as the Academic Core, contains the buildings housing most of the school's classrooms and labs. There are three separate housing areas on the periphery of the campus: North Lake, South Village, and West Lake Village. North Lake Village overlooks Lake Como, with recreational activities including boating and water skiing, with a new boardwalk and dining facility opening along its waterfront in 2017.

=== Expansion ===
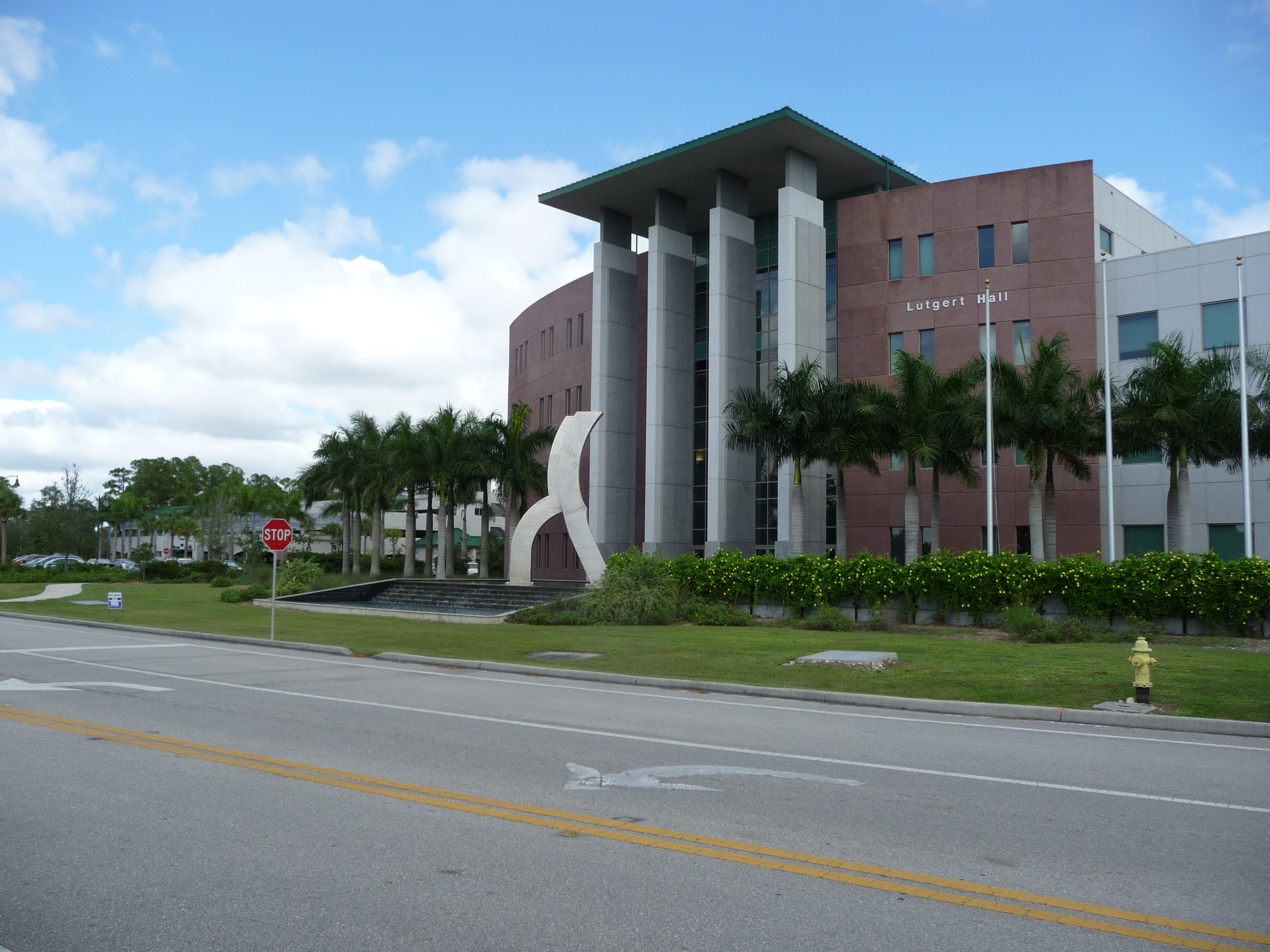
Lutgert College of Business

The Lutgert College of Business building opened in 2008, Holmes Hall (which houses the U.A. Whitaker School of Engineering) in 2009, and Herbert J. Sugden Hall (home to the School of Resort & Hospitality Management) in 2008. Academic Building 7 for the College of Arts and Sciences was completed in 2010 and named Seidler Hall in 2016 after donors Lee and Gene Seidler. In 2012, Academic Building 8 was completed. Now Marieb Hall, it was dedicated to Elaine Nicpon Marieb in 2012. The $24 million, 60,000-square-foot (5,600 m^{2}) building was designed for the College of Health Professions, which in 2017 was renamed the Marieb College of Health & Human Services after Marieb's second transformative gift, an additional $10 million pledge.

Other construction projects include expansion of the Cohen Center (the student union building also affectionately known as Harv's Place in honor of donor Harvey Cohen), an addition to the fine arts building, a 2017 expansion of Alico Arena, an addition of one of the largest solar panel fields at a university, and the construction of academic building 9. FGCU also opened a new facility a few miles northeast of campus in 2016, the Emergent Technologies Institute.

FGCU has created the Everglades Wetland Research Park (EWRP), housed in the Kapnick Education and Research Center on the campus of the Naples Botanical Garden in Naples, Florida, approximately 35 miles south of the main FGCU campus. The EWRP provides teaching, research, and service related to wetland, river, coastal science and ecological engineering.

In 2019, FGCU began construction for the Water School, a facility to house research labs and classrooms focused on environmental implications of water quality in Southwest Florida. Upon its completion, the Water School (also known as Academic Building 9) became FGCU's largest academic building. The Water School opened in November 2022.

=== Satellite campuses ===
There are three other satellite campuses: Naples, the Atrium in Fort Myers, and Herald Court Centre in Punta Gorda, where continuing education and lifelong learning classes are held. The FGCU Board of Trustees voted in January 2010 to assume ownership of 500 acres (2.0 km^{2}) in Buckingham. Located between East Fort Myers and Lehigh Acres, the land already contains over 60 buildings and housing for 300 people. Originally, the property operated as Gulf Coast Center, a residential facility for people with developmental disabilities. After the state phased out such large-scale institutions, FGCU's board of trustees accepted the land donation. It is used for off-campus team-building exercises and storage, among other things.

In 2007, the university purchased the former Bonita Beach Plantation Resort in Bonita Springs for use as a marine research laboratory. The Norm and Nancy Vester Marine and Environmental Science Research Field Station site has 10 boat slips and is located on Estero Bay. The site includes laboratories, offices, apartments for visiting researchers and a classroom.

=== Environmental sustainability ===
Since its founding, 400 acres (1.6 km^{2}) on the main campus have been set aside for environmental preservation. FGCU also has constructed a number of lakes on the campus that are home to large numbers of wildlife; the lakes also help promote the ecology of the area. Environmental sustainability is the principal goal expressed in the university charter. Seidler Hall, the new facility housing science laboratories and classrooms for the College of Arts and Sciences, achieved platinum certification, the highest level awarded by the U.S. Green Building Council's Leadership in Energy and Environmental Design. The university's 15-acre (61,000 m^{2}) solar field supplies about 85 percent of the energy needed to operate Holmes, Lutgert and Seidler halls, reducing FGCU's reliance on Florida Power & Light Co. by 18 percent. An ice thermal storage plant sends chilled water through an underground loop that cools campus buildings, saving more than $1.64 million over five years. The newest residence halls—Everglades, Biscayne, Palmetto, Osprey, and Eagle—heat their water via rooftop solar panels.

=== Library ===
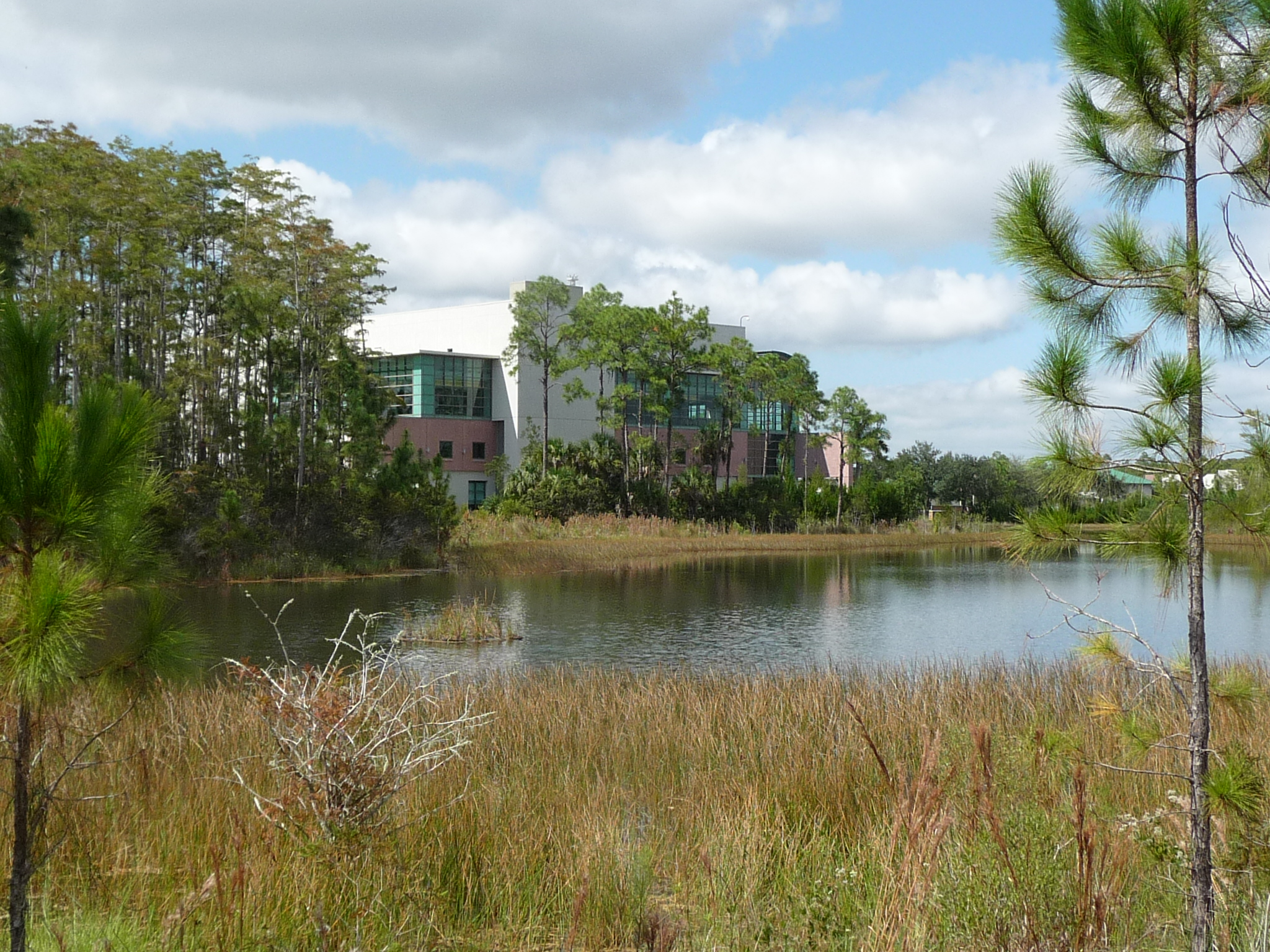
FGCU's Library Complex

The Library Complex is on FGCU's main campus in Fort Myers. The main facility accommodated 1 million visitors for the first time in the 2016–17 school year. The library has more than 1.5 million items in its collection, which can be accessed by students or any patron with a library card. The library also subscribes to more than 400 databases to allow students and patrons access to more than 700 million full-text articles. Its east wing includes a 115-seat computer lab.

In 2014, the Collection Analysis Project (CAP) began so that the FGCU library could determine what parts of the collection were being utilized by students and what could be removed in order to make way for various new projects within the library. One of the projects completed in 2023 is a renovation of the computer lab in the east wing of the first floor. The renovation features new furniture, computers, and work areas. In addition to its various print and electronic collections, the library also houses various art pieces, including seven signed lithographs by Salvador Dalí. The Archives and Special Collections unit on the library's third floor has held various exhibitions since the fall of 2013. The list of past exhibits is on the library's website. Other resources in the library complex include the ArtLab Gallery, Center for Academic Achievement, Lucas Center for Faculty Development, and the Writing Center. In 2019, the Library Complex was formally named after FGCU's third president, Wilson G. Bradshaw.

== Academics ==
College/school	Year founded
College of Arts and Sciences	1995
Marieb College of Health & Human Services	1997
College of Professional Studies	1997
College of Education	2001
U.A. Whitaker School of Engineering	2005
Lutgert College of Business	2008
School of Entrepreneurship	2019
The Water School	2019

Florida Gulf Coast University academics are divided into eight colleges. In 2024, new freshmen averaged an SAT score of 1122, and a high school grade point average of 4.12.

The Lutgert College of Business is an AACSB-accredited institution, offering undergraduate degrees in accounting, computer information systems, economics, finance, management, and marketing; and the Small Business Development Center, which offers counseling and other services to regional businesses. The college offers the following graduate degrees: accounting and taxation, computer information systems, and business administration (both traditional and executive). FGCU also added a real estate undergraduate degree, which began in the fall of 2012.

FGCU's School of Entrepreneurship is a nationally ranked and SACSCOC-accredited institution that offers an undergraduate degree in interdisciplinary entrepreneurship studies (B.A.), entrepreneurship minor, and entrepreneurship graduate certificate. The School of Entrepreneurship houses the FGCU Institute for Entrepreneurship, which operates all extracurricular programs and activities such as the FGCU Runway Program Student and Alumni Business Incubator, Freshman Entrepreneurship Living-Learning Community, and FGCU Veterans Florida Entrepreneurship Program.

The Resort and Hospitality Management Department offers several majors, with students getting the opportunity to gain supervised field work experience at one of many resorts and spas in the area. Professional golf management is a program with limited access (it's the only remaining Professional Golfers Association–certified program in Florida and one of just 19 in the country), much like the nursing, music and athletic training programs.

The university requires all students to complete a three-credit-hour, undergraduate course called University Colloquium: A Sustainable Future. This colloquium aims to educate graduates on the importance of ecology, preservation, and sustainability. FGCU also makes service learning a graduation requirement, and students have contributed more than 5 million volunteer hours in the community since the university opened in 1997.

FGCU's College of Engineering also offers civil, environmental, bioengineering and software engineering, the last of which began to phase out the overlapping computer science degree in 2011. Holmes Hall was built to facilitate the engineering programs, along with the Emergent Technologies Institute. FGCU's bachelor's programs in bioengineering, civil engineering, environmental engineering, and software engineering are accredited by the Engineering Accreditation Commission of ABET. A Master of Science in engineering (MSE) program began in 2017.

In 2017, FGCU elevated its honors program to an Honors College, opening in August with almost 900 students.

=== Research ===
In 2015–16, nearly $10 million in funds were granted for research. Research institutes include the Biotechnology Research Group; the Lucas Center for Real Estate; Coastal Watershed Institute; Center for Environmental & Sustainability Education; FGCU Center for Leadership and Innovation; Florida Institute of Government; Center for Positive Aging; Whitaker Center for Science, Mathematics & Technology Education; Institute for Youth and Justice Studies, and the Regional Economic Research Institute. Since FGCU opened, the total funds awarded for research amount to $204.8 million as of 2016.

=== Rankings ===
Academic rankings

Regional
- U.S. News & World Report: 78

National
- Forbes: 247
- Washington Monthly: 123
- WSJ/College Pulse: > 600

Florida Gulf Coast University was ranked #331-440 in the National Universities category in the 2022-23 U.S. News & World Report annual rankings of the best colleges and universities. The institution was also named #169-227 in the Top Public Schools category.

For its 2021 rankings of U.S. News & World Report ranked FGCU 68th overall in Regional Universities South. In the south category, FGCU was also named the #16 Most Innovative School and #66 in Top Performers in Social Mobility.

In 2024, Washington Monthly ranked FGCU 123rd among 438 national universities in the U.S. based on FGCU's contribution to the public good, as measured by social mobility, research, and promoting public service.

Forbes ranked FGCU 247th out of the top 500 rated private and public colleges and universities in America for the 2024-25 report. FGCU was also ranked 113th among public colleges and 58th in the south.

In 2020, The Princeton Review ranked FGCU as the 30th-best undergraduate entrepreneurship program overall and first in Florida.

U.S. News ranked FGCU as tied for 78th among all regional universities in the southern United States in 2019, and tied for 29th among public ones.

== Athletics ==
FGCU's athletics teams are known as the Eagles. FGCU completed the four-year transition to NCAA Division I for all athletics programs in 2011. The Eagles compete in the Division I Atlantic Sun Conference (ASUN), which they joined in 2007.

FGCU intercollegiate athletics offers:

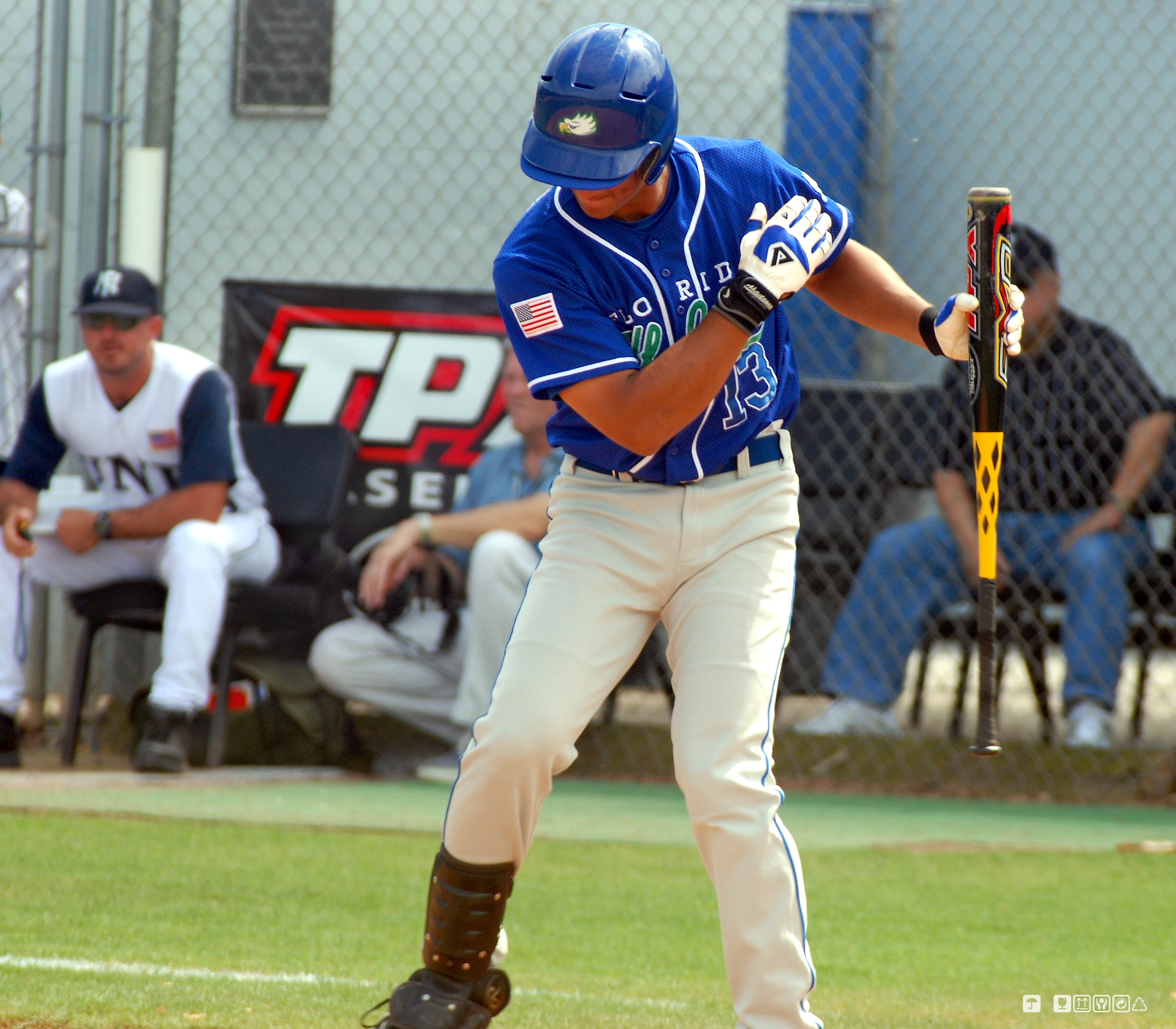
FGCU Eagles baseball

- Men's and women's golf
- Men's and women's tennis
- Men's and women's basketball
- Women's softball
- Men's baseball
- Men's and women's cross country
- Women's volleyball
- Men's and Women’s soccer
- Women's swimming and diving
- Women's beach volleyball

FGCU is a member of the National Collegiate Athletic Association (NCAA) Division I, and a member of the Atlantic Sun Conference. FGCU plays its men's and women's basketball games at Alico Arena and its baseball games at Swanson Stadium, with other on-campus facilities including softball and soccer fields, tennis courts and an aquatics complex for intercollegiate competition.

The average GPA of a student athlete at FGCU was 3.27 in the spring semester of 2017.

=== Baseball ===
The FGCU baseball team has sent several players to professional leagues, including Major League Baseball pitchers Richard Bleier who was selected unanimously as the Atlantic Sun Conference Pitcher of the Year and First Team All Sun Conference, and all-star Chris Sale and Kutter Crawford, both of whom played for the 2021 Boston Red Sox. Pitcher Casey Coleman was the first Eagle to reach the major leagues, with the 2010 Chicago Cubs. Pitcher Justin Stiver was the first Eagle athlete drafted by a professional team in any sport, selected by the Houston Astros in the 2006 MLB draft.

=== Basketball ===
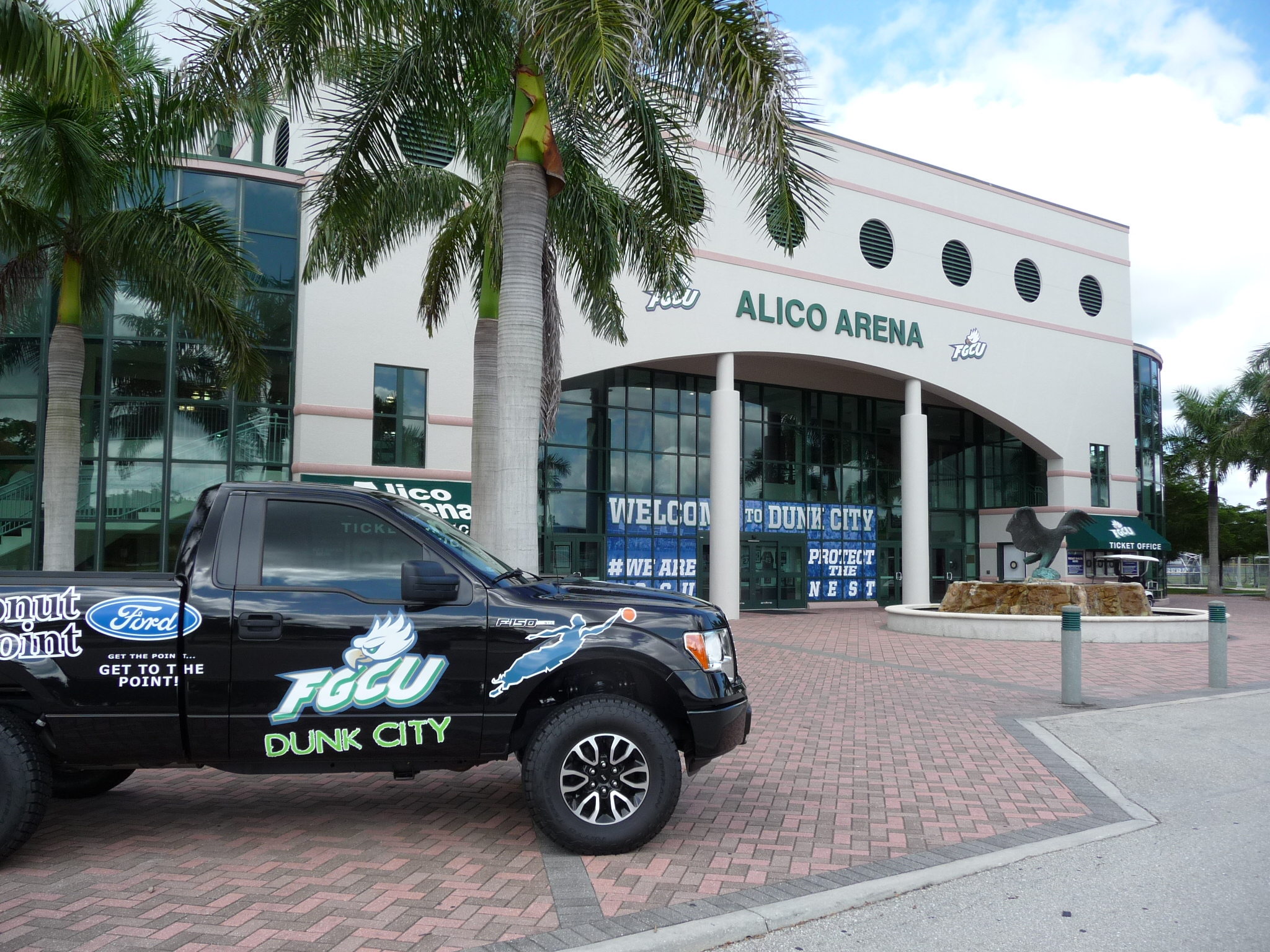
The front of Alico Arena on the campus of FGCU

On March 24, 2007, FGCU's women's basketball team ended its 35–1 season with a loss in the Division II National Championship to Southern Connecticut State University. One year later, in 2008, the women's basketball team qualified for the WNIT, becoming the first team to qualify for the WNIT in its first season of Division I sports. During the 2008 WNIT Tourney, the team became the first Atlantic Sun Conference team to win a post-season game since 1998, when Florida International University won in the women's NCAA tourney. The women's team has since won the Atlantic Sun Conference regular-season and/or tournament championship each year since (except for 2010) with annual postseason appearances either in the NCAA Tournament or the WNIT, in which the Eagles finished second nationally in 2016 after losing to South Dakota in the championship game.

In 2012, FGCU's first year of full Division I postseason eligibility, the men's team played in the Atlantic Sun Championship final, losing to Belmont. In 2013, the team won the Atlantic Sun championship, beating top-seeded Mercer in the conference tournament final earning the automatic invitation to the 2013 NCAA Division I men's basketball tournament. In its first-ever tournament appearance, the No. 15 seeded Eagles upset the No. 2 seeded Georgetown Hoyas in the first round of the tournament and the No. 7 seeded San Diego State Aztecs in the second round. The Eagles became the seventh No. 15 seed to advance to the round of 32 and the first to advance to the Sweet 16. The Eagles went on to win two more ASUN championships in 2016 and 2017.

== Student life ==
Undergraduate demographics as of Fall 2023
Race and ethnicity	Total
Asian	2%
White	58%
Hispanic	25%
Black	5%
Unknown	4%
Two or more races	3%
International student	2%
Economic diversity
Low-income (Note: The percentage of students who received an income-based federal Pell grant intended for low-income students.)	30%
Affluent (Note: The percentage of students who are a part of the American middle class at the bare minimum.)	70%

=== Residence life ===
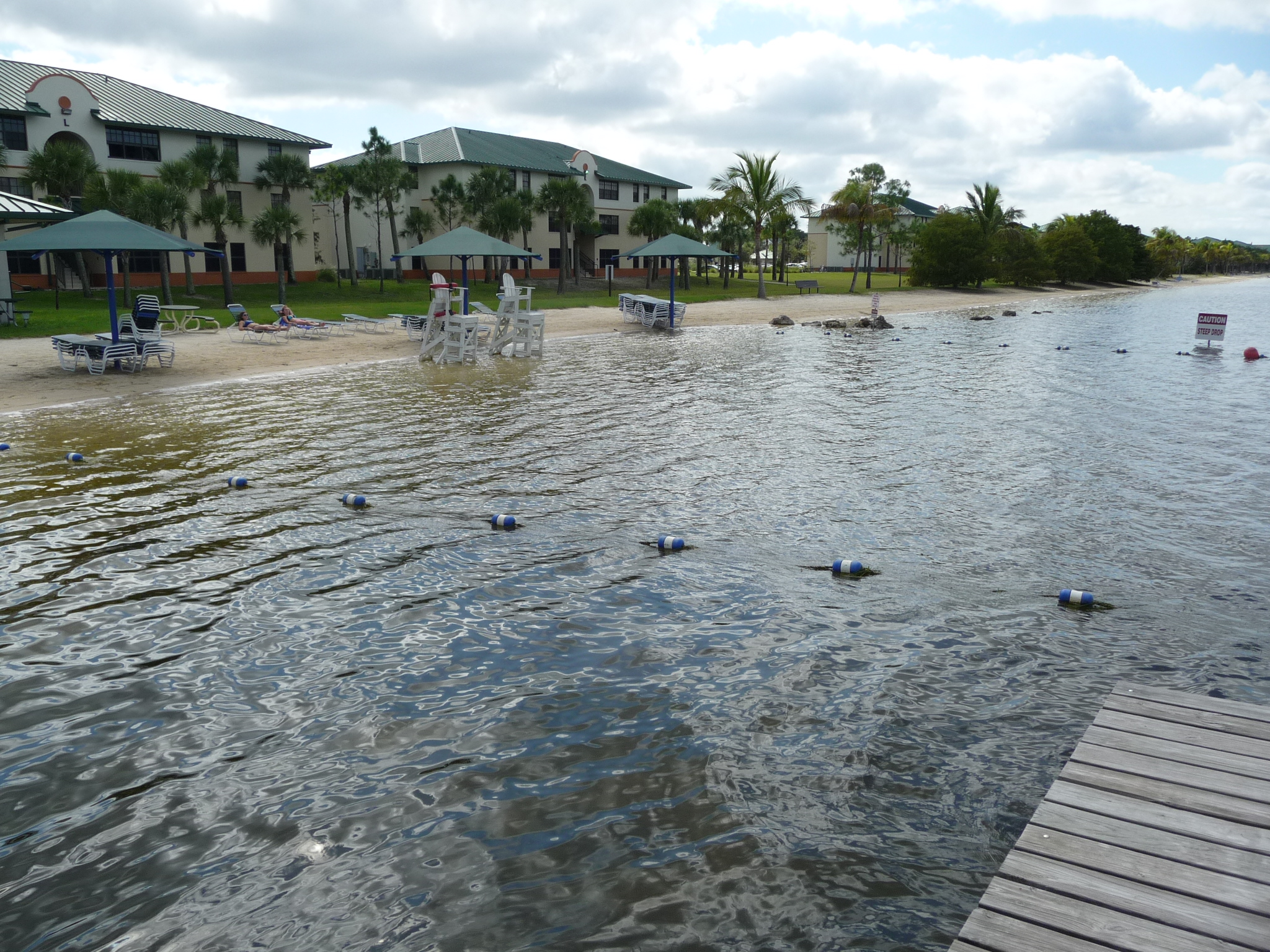
Lake Como and North Lake Village student housing

On-campus housing is made up of three sections: North Lake Village, South Village and West Lake Village. North Lake Village is on an 80-acre lake and features apartment-style residence halls with waterfront recreation. West Lake Village was previously owned by American Campus Communities and formerly called College Club Apartments. Housing 501 students, it was bought by the university for $17 million, and the apartments officially became part of FGCU Housing and Residence Life in 2010. Themed housing is available, such as Honors and Wellness communities. South Village (SoVi) is composed of suite-style residence halls with five buildings: Everglades Hall, Biscayne Hall, Palmetto Hall, Osprey Hall and Eagle Hall, housing more than 1,720 first-year students.

In the summer of 2013, South Village opened the SoVi Pool, a resort-style pool featuring a "beach-entry" and built-in pool volleyball court. FGCU enhanced the North Lake Village complex in 2017 by opening a new lakefront boardwalk and dining facility.

More than 3,200 students live in both North Lake Village and SoVi. Freshmen are not required to live on campus, but on-campus housing is usually filled to capacity every year.

Individual halls sponsor their own activities and socials, and leadership positions are available in the Resident Hall Association.

A commonly used form of transportation on campus is the Eagle Express, a shuttle that operates daily, taking students from residence halls to classes and activities around campus.

=== Greek life ===
Florida Gulf Coast University has 24 fraternity and sorority chapters on campus. Greek life is governed by the Panhellenic Council, the Interfraternity Council, National PanHellenic Council and the Multicultural Greek Council. There is no separate Greek housing on campus.

=== Campus recreation ===
The official Campus Recreation department organizes several day and overnight trips annually, including rock climbing, skydiving, white-water rafting, sea kayaking and more. There are also 32 official sports clubs on campus, many of which engage in intercollegiate competition with their peers.

=== Student organizations ===
There are more than 165 registered student organizations at FGCU, including Student Government, which appropriates funding for many of them.

=== Media ===
The university has operated public broadcasting stations WGCU television and WGCU-FM since 1996, when the license was transferred from the University of South Florida in Tampa. WGCU is a PBS member while WGCU-FM is an NPR member and broadcasts news, talk, and jazz. FGCU 360 Now is a website that features university news and complements the official university periodical, FGCU 360 Magazine, which was rebranded in 2016 after originally publishing as Pinnacle.

Eagle Media is the university's official independent student media group. Originally founded in 1997 as "The Eagle" newspaper, the media group now publishes a weekly newspaper, a website, and TV/radio programming when classes are in session. In 2017, the Student Media Advisory Board recognized Eagle News, ENTV and Eagle Radio jointly as Eagle Media, FGCU's only student-led media program.

== Campus demographics ==
Historical population
Census	Pop.	Note	%±
2020	3,659		—
U.S. Decennial Census; 2020

Florida Gulf Coast University was listed as a census-designated place (CDP) in 2020 U.S. census for statistical purposes. It is part of the Cape Coral-Fort Myers, Florida Metropolitan Statistical Area.

Florida Gulf Coast University CDP, Florida – Racial and ethnic composition Note: the US Census treats Hispanic/Latino as an ethnic category. This table excludes Latinos from the racial categories and assigns them to a separate category. Hispanics/Latinos may be of any race.
Race / Ethnicity (NH = Non-Hispanic)	Pop 2020	% 2020
White alone (NH)	2,631	71.90%
Black or African American alone (NH)	243	6.64%
Native American or Alaska Native alone (NH)	8	0.22%
Asian alone (NH)	51	1.39%
Pacific Islander alone (NH)	0	0.00%
Some Other Race alone (NH)	22	0.60%
Mixed Race or Multi-Racial (NH)	141	3.85%
Hispanic or Latino (any race)	563	15.39%
Total	3,659	100.00%

== Notable alumni ==
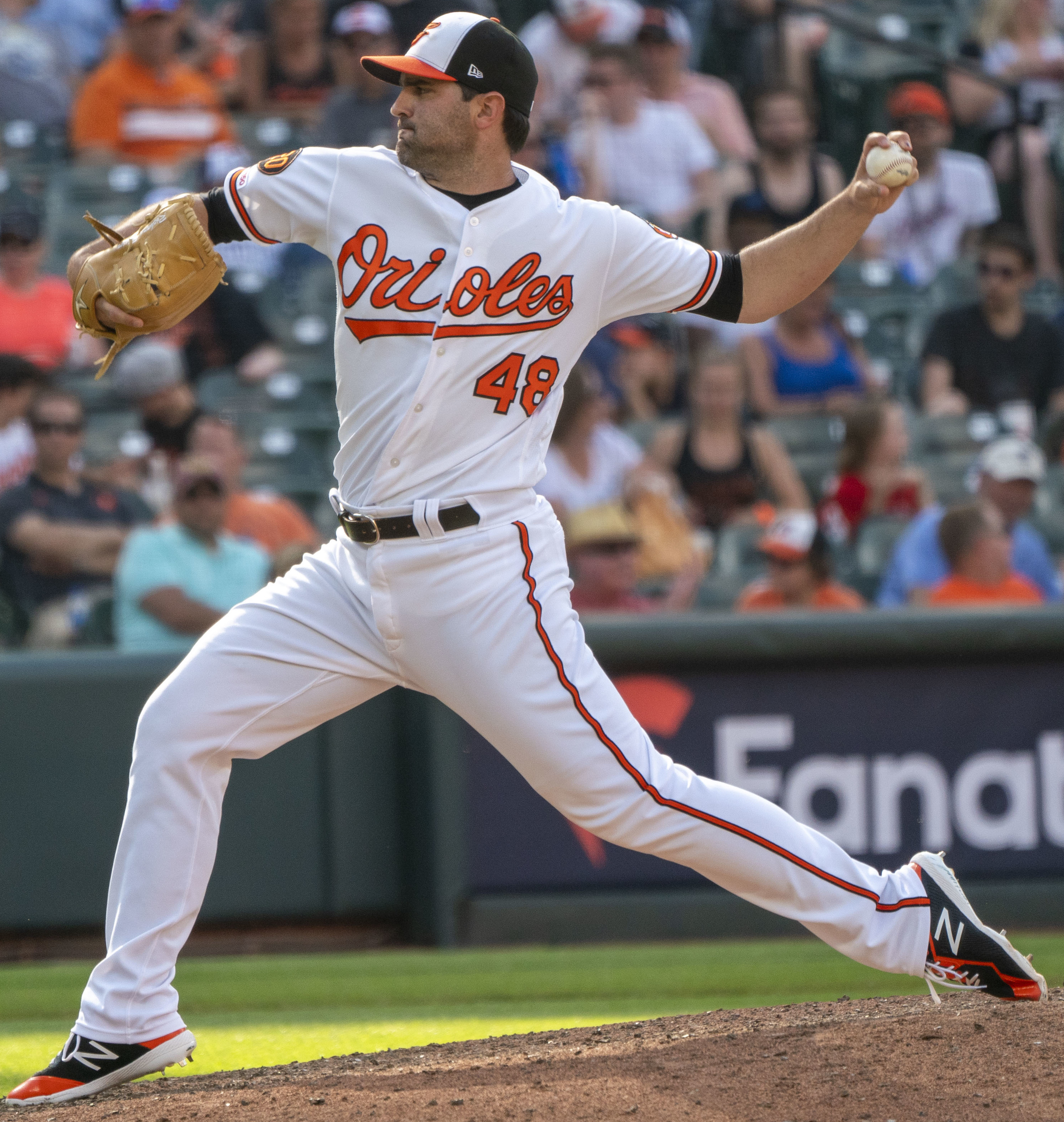
Richard Bleier

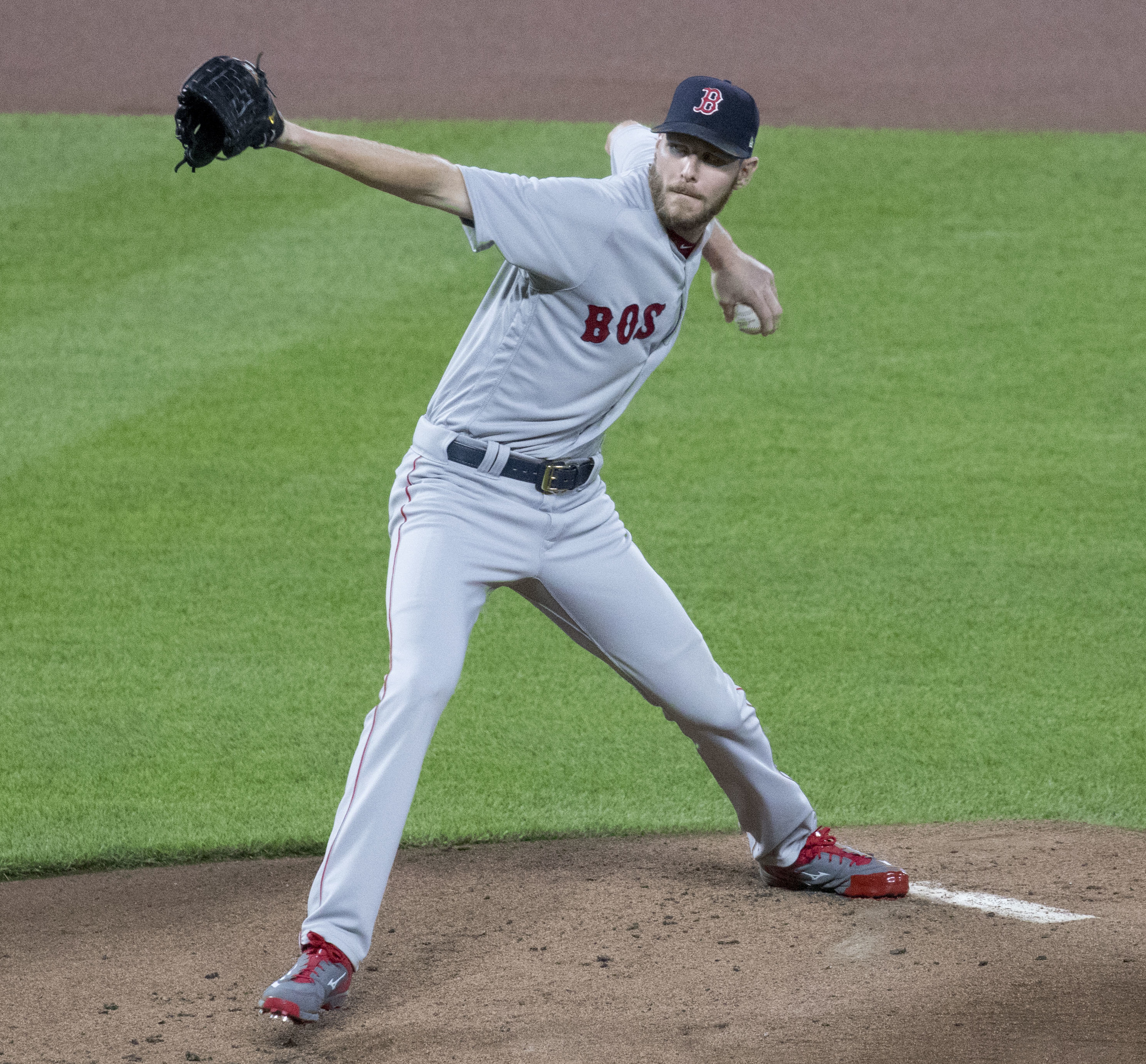
Chris Sale

- Eli Abaev, professional basketball player
- Jacob Barnes, professional baseball player
- Richard Bleier, professional baseball player
- Sherwood Brown, professional basketball player
- Matt Caldwell, former member of the Florida House of Representatives
- Don Carman, professional baseball player
- Ross Chastain, professional racecar driver
- Casey Coleman, professional baseball player
- Kutter Crawford, professional baseball player
- Cherie DeVaux, professional horse trainer
- Tavian Dunn-Martin, professional basketball player
- Dane Eagle, member of the Florida House of Representatives
- Tiffany Esposito, member of the Florida House of Representatives
- Chase Fieler, professional basketball player
- Brandon Goodwin, professional basketball player
- Courtney Jolly, professional monster truck driver
- Derek Lamely, professional golfer
- Priscila Navarro, concert pianist
- Spencer Roach, Florida state representative
- Chris Sale, professional baseball player
- Brett Comer, basketball coach

== See also ==
- Hertz Arena, facility 2 miles (3.2 km) south; home to FGCU's ice hockey clubs
- List of Florida Gulf Coast University people
