= Priscila Navarro =

Peruvian pianist

Priscila Navarro (born 27 April 1994, in Huánuco) is a Peruvian pianist.

== Life ==
At age 5 she began practicing her first notes on a keyboard she had received as a Christmas gift. As she learned quickly her father continued to support her talent and she was enrolled in a summer course of piano at the National Cultural Institute in Trujillo, Peru, with Professor Silvia Rosales Tam.

As of 2014, Navarro was enrolled at the Bower School of Music at Florida Gulf Coast University.

== Awards ==
- 2007: First place National Concerto Competition in Lima, Peru
- 2009: Maddy Summer Artist Award
- Kiwanis Music Festival special scholarship
- 2011: Music Teachers National Association Piano Competitions, solo and duet
- 2013: First place Biennial International Beethoven Sonata Competition
