= Hodges University =

Former private university in Fort Myers, Florida

- Logo from 2007 to 2019
- Motto: Stay Near. Go Far.
- Type: Private university
- Active: 1990–2024
- President: Charlene Wendel
- Provost: Diana Schultz
- Faculty: 101 total: 17 full-time, 84 adjunct faculty (2021)
- Students: 410
- Undergraduates: 340
- Postgraduates: 70
- Location: 4501 Colonial Blvd, Fort Myers, Florida, U.S. 26°16′33.1″N 81°44′18.3″W
- Campus: 10 acres (0.04 km^{2})
- Colours: Navy Blue and Coral Red
- Mascot: Hawk
- Website: hodges.edu

Hodges University was a private university in Fort Myers, Florida, United States. Founded in 1990 in Naples as International College, it was renamed Hodges University in 2007 in recognition of a $12 million donation from local residents Earl and Thelma Hodges. In August 2023, citing declining enrollment and ensuing financial challenges, Hodges University announced plans to close permanently by the end of August 2024. The final day of classes was on August 25, 2024.

== History ==
Hodges University was founded in Naples, Florida, in 1990 as International College with 85 students. It focused on providing education and training opportunities for adult learners. It began offering online degree programs in 1995. International College achieved regional accreditation in 1998 and received the authority to offer master's degree programs in 1999. In 2000, International College moved out of its original location, a rented storefront in East Naples, and constructed a new campus at 2655 Northbrooke Drive in Naples. The college was renamed Hodges University on June 1, 2007, in recognition of a $12 million donation from Earl and Thelma Hodges, founders and owners of Hodges Funeral Home in Naples since 1964.

Long-time Hodges faculty member Charlene Wendel became the university's president on July 6, 2023, after the board of trustees dismissed former president John Meyer. Meyer, a former Florida Southwestern State College dean, had been appointed president on December 15, 2017. Past presidents were Donald Wortham, former vice president for strategic initiatives at the College of St. Scholastica, appointed in February 2016; David Borofsky, former president of Dakota State University, appointed in December 2014; Jeannette Brock, a long-time Hodges academic administrator appointed in July 2013; and Terry McMahan (1990–2013).

Since 1990, Hodges University has conferred more than 14,000 degrees. Enrollment declined from 2,800 students in 2013 to only 410 students in 2023, leading to serious operating deficits. The Naples campus closed in September 2021, with classes and operations consolidated to the Fort Myers campus.

In December 2022, the Southern Association of Colleges and Schools Commission on Colleges placed Hodges University on probation, "the most serious public sanction imposed by the SACSCOC Board of Trustees short of loss of accreditation." Hodges was continued in accreditation during probation.

In August 2023, citing low enrollment and ensuing financial challenges as well as the impact of the COVID-19 pandemic and Hurricane Ian, Hodges University announced plans to close permanently by the end of August 2024. Hodges ceased accepting new degree-seeking students ahead of the fall 2023 semester. The majority of classes and degree offerings will cease at the end of April 2024. Hodges is working to develop teach-out partnerships and identify a permanent custodian for the university's academic records. In April 2024, the university's campus was sold to the Evangelical Christian School of Fort Myers. The final day of classes was on August 25, 2024.

== Academics ==
As of May 2023, Hodges offered 11 associate degree programs, 14 bachelor's degree programs, 6 master's degree programs, and several certificate programs. The university also facilitated a comprehensive English as a Second Language (ESL) program.

In addition to in-person classes in Fort Myers, Hodges offered many courses online and in an accelerated 4-week format. As of Fall 2021, 41% of undergraduate students and 92% of graduate students were enrolled only in distance education courses.

Hodges University also operated the Frances Pew Hayes Center for Lifelong Learning, the Dr. Peter Thomas Veterans Services Center and Center for Diversity, Inclusion and Cultural Competency.

The university was organized into five colleges with 17 full-time and 84 part-time faculty:

- Fisher School of Technology
- Johnson School of Business
- Nichols School of Professional Studies
- School of Health Sciences
- School of General Studies

=== Accreditation ===
Hodges University was accredited by the Southern Association of Colleges and Schools Commission on Colleges to award associate, bachelor's, and master's degrees. In December 2022, the accreditation agency placed Hodges University on probation, "the most serious public sanction imposed by the SACSCOC Board of Trustees short of loss of accreditation." The university remained accredited during the one-year probation period.

Eight degree programs within the Johnson School of Business were accredited through the International Accreditation Council for Business Education. The Master of Science in clinical mental health counseling degree program was accredited by the Council for Accreditation of Counseling and Related Educational Programs. The Associate in Science in physical therapist assistant (PTA) was accredited through the Commission on Accreditation in Physical Therapy Education. The Bachelor of Science in Nursing (BSN) program was accredited by the Accreditation Commission for Education in Nursing.

=== Library ===
The Terry P. McMahan Library served the Hodges University community. The library participated in the Federal Depository Library Program beginning in 2003 as one of two federal depository libraries in Southwest Florida. As of 2023, Hodges University was no longer listed in the FDLD directory.

=== Rankings ===
Hodges was ranked #103-135 in Regional Universities South, and #133 in Top Performers on Social Mobility, by U.S. News & World Report in 2023.

Hodges was federally recognized as a Hispanic-serving institution, with 34% Hispanic student enrollment as of fall 2021.

== Students ==
- Enrollment: 551 (432 undergraduate) as of Fall 2021
- Undergraduate full-time enrollment – 51%; Undergraduate part-time enrollment – 49%
- Undergraduate student age: 23% 24 and under, 77% 25 and over
- Gender: Female: 57%; male: 42%
- Ethnicity: 34% Hispanic, 12% Black, 38% white
