= Richard Bleier =

American baseball pitcher (born 1987)

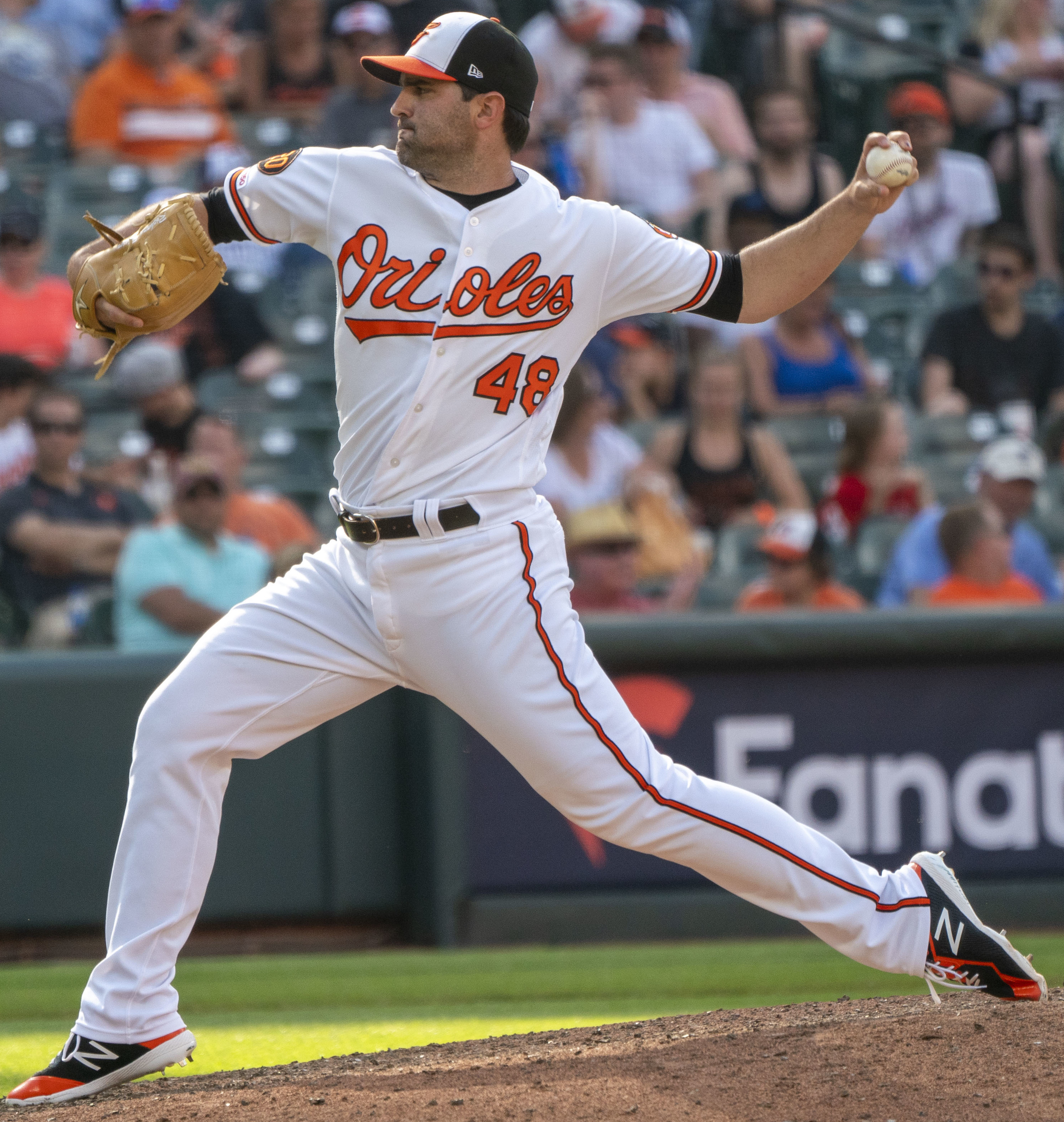
- Bleier pitching for the Orioles in 2019
- Pitcher
- Born: April 16, 1987 (age 39); Davie, Florida, U.S.
- Batted: Left Threw: Left

MLB debut
- May 30, 2016, for the New York Yankees

Last MLB appearance
- August 6, 2023, for the Boston Red Sox

MLB statistics
- Win–loss record: 15–6
- Earned run average: 3.27
- Strikeouts: 187
- Stats at Baseball Reference

Teams
- New York Yankees (2016); Baltimore Orioles (2017–2020); Miami Marlins (2020–2022); Boston Red Sox (2023)

Richard Sidney Bleier (born April 16, 1987) is an American former professional baseball pitcher. He played in Major League Baseball (MLB) for the New York Yankees, Baltimore Orioles, Miami Marlins, and Boston Red Sox.

In high school, he was a State of Florida All Star in 2005. In his junior year of college at Florida Gulf Coast University, Bleier was selected unanimously as the Atlantic Sun Conference Pitcher of the Year and First Team All Sun Conference. The Texas Rangers selected Bleier in the sixth round of the 2008 MLB draft. In 2009, his 125 strikeouts were the second-most in the Rangers' minor league system, and he gave up the fewest walks per nine innings in the California League. Bleier signed with the Washington Nationals organization before the 2015 season, pitched for the Harrisburg Senators that year, and had the most wins (14) and the lowest earned run average (ERA; 2.57) of all minor league pitchers in the Nationals minor league system. He was a 2015 post-season Double-A Eastern League all-star and was voted a Washington organization all-star by MiLB.com.

Bleier debuted in the majors in 2016 for the New York Yankees, following nine minor league seasons in which he pitched 956 innings, and he was one of 12 Yankee pitchers since 1919 to make his debut after turning 29 years old. In 23 relief appearances in 2016 he had a 1.96 ERA. In February 2017 the Yankees traded Bleier to the Baltimore Orioles. In 57 relief appearances in 2017, he had a 1.99 ERA. In 31 relief appearances in 2018, he had a 1.93 ERA. His 1.97 ERA for the seasons 2016–2018 was the second-lowest in major league baseball, of all pitchers with 100 or more innings pitched. During 2020–2022, he pitched for the Miami Marlins.

Used as a relief pitcher, the left-hander throws a fastball that hits the low 90s, a changeup, a curveball, and a slider. Mick Reinhard described Bleier's approach as "pitch to contact" and use excellent control. Bleier pitched for Team Israel in the 2023 World Baseball Classic.

== Early and personal life ==
Bleier was born in Davie, Florida. His father, Lawrence, is from Brooklyn, in New York City, and grew up playing stickball in Brownsville, Brooklyn; his mother is Kathleen Bleier. Bleier has a brother and a sister, and is Jewish. His father was born Jewish and his mother converted to Judaism. His wife is Brett Bleier.

Bleier grew up in Plantation, Florida, and played baseball at South Plantation High School, from which he graduated in 2005. As a freshman, he was 5 feet 6 inches (1.68 m) tall and weighed 117 pounds (53 kg). He was chosen for the county and state All Star games in 2005.

Bleier currently lives in Fort Lauderdale, Florida.

== College ==
Bleier played college baseball at Florida Gulf Coast University (FGCU) for the Florida Gulf Coast Eagles in Fort Myers, Florida on a partial scholarship. He majored in criminal justice. By 2008, Bleier had grown to 6 feet 4 inches (1.93 m) and 210 pounds (95 kg) and was throwing 90 miles per hour (140 km/h). In his junior year of college he was selected unanimously as the Atlantic Sun Conference Pitcher of the Year and First Team All Sun Conference after he had a 7–1 win–loss record and a 2.09 earned run average (ERA), leading the conference in wins, ERA, complete games, and innings pitched (90.1).

In his three years at the university, he had a 2.70 ERA (2nd-best all-time in school history), 17 wins (7th) against 4 losses, and 181 strikeouts (7th) in 209.2 innings. In 2021, Bleier was inducted into the ASUN Hall of Fame. In November 2022, he was named to the FGCU Athletics Hall of Fame.

== Professional career ==
=== Texas Rangers (2008–2013) ===
The Texas Rangers selected Bleier in the sixth round of the 2008 Major League Baseball draft, after his junior year in college. His signing made him the highest draft pick in the history of Florida Gulf Coast University.

Bleier played in the Rangers system. Playing for the Bakersfield Blaze in 2009, he was 7–11 and gave up the fewest walks-per-9-innings in the California League (1.25), and had the best strikeout/walk ratio in the league (5.40). In 2009 between Bakersfield and Hickory, he was 9–12 and his 125 strikeouts were the second-most in the Rangers' minor league system.

In 2010, he was 7–11 for Frisco, led the Texas League with 28 starts and two shutouts, and gave up the third-fewest walks per nine innings in the league, at 1.54. Bleier was voted Pitcher of the Week in the Class AA Texas League with the Rangers' Frisco RoughRiders on both May 10, 2010, and June 6, 2011. He spent 2010 through 2012 in Frisco, pitching to 5.04 ERA in 2010, a 7–8 record and 5.60 ERA and 1.4 walks per nine innings in 2011, and a 0–2 record and one save and a 3.94 ERA in 2012. He split the 2013 season between the Triple-A Round Rock Express and Frisco, registering an overall 6–6 record with four saves and a 3.32 ERA with 49 strikeouts.

=== Toronto Blue Jays (2014) ===
After the 2013 season, the Toronto Blue Jays selected Bleier from the Rangers in the Triple-A phase of the Rule 5 draft. He split the 2014 season between the Double-A New Hampshire Fisher Cats and the Triple-A Buffalo Bisons, registering a cumulative 6–5 record with a save and a 3.95 ERA with 11 walks (1.1 walks per nine innings; he had the lowest walk ratio in the Eastern League) and 45 strikeouts in 86.2 innings pitched.

=== Washington Nationals (2015) ===
On December 13, 2014, Bleier signed a minor league contract with the Washington Nationals organization, and he pitched first for the Harrisburg Senators in 2015, for whom in 16 games (15 starts) he was 8–3 with a 2.45 ERA, as in 103 innings he walked only 9 batters (one intentionally), and led the Eastern League with a rate of 0.8 walks per nine innings. He was voted Eastern League Pitcher of the Week with the Senators on May 25, 2015. He was a post-season Class AA Eastern League All Star with Harrisburg. He was promoted to the Syracuse Chiefs of the Class AAA International League, for whom he was 6–2 with a 2.75 ERA, led the league by not allowing a home run in 68.2 innings, and was second in the league with 0.9 walks per nine innings. In 2015, Bleier had the most wins (14) and the lowest ERA (2.57) of all minor league pitchers in the Washington Nationals minor league system. He was voted a Washington organization All Star by MiLB.com. On November 6, 2015, Bleier elected free agency.

=== New York Yankees (2016) ===
On December 18, 2015, Bleier signed a minor league contract with the New York Yankees organization. He began the 2016 season with the Scranton/Wilkes-Barre RailRiders of the International League.

Bleier was called up to the majors for the first time on May 26, 2016, by the Yankees. He debuted in the majors on May 30, becoming the 27th Yankee to wear uniform number 50. His debut followed nine minor league seasons in which he pitched 956 innings. Bleier was one of 12 Yankees pitchers since 1919 to make his debut after turning 29 years old, and the first since Amauri Sanit in 2011. He became the third former FGCU player to play in the majors, joining pitchers Chris Sale and Casey Coleman.

Yankee manager Joe Girardi said: "I can use him either way – for distance or I could use him if I wanted (to pitch to) a couple lefties. He's a ground ball guy. He gets a ton of ground balls.... He was a starter down there, so he's built up." In 23 relief appearances in 2016, Bleier had two holds and a 1.96 ERA in 23 innings, a 1.043 WHIP, and left-handed batters hit .150 against him.

=== Baltimore Orioles (2017–2020) ===
==== 2017 ====
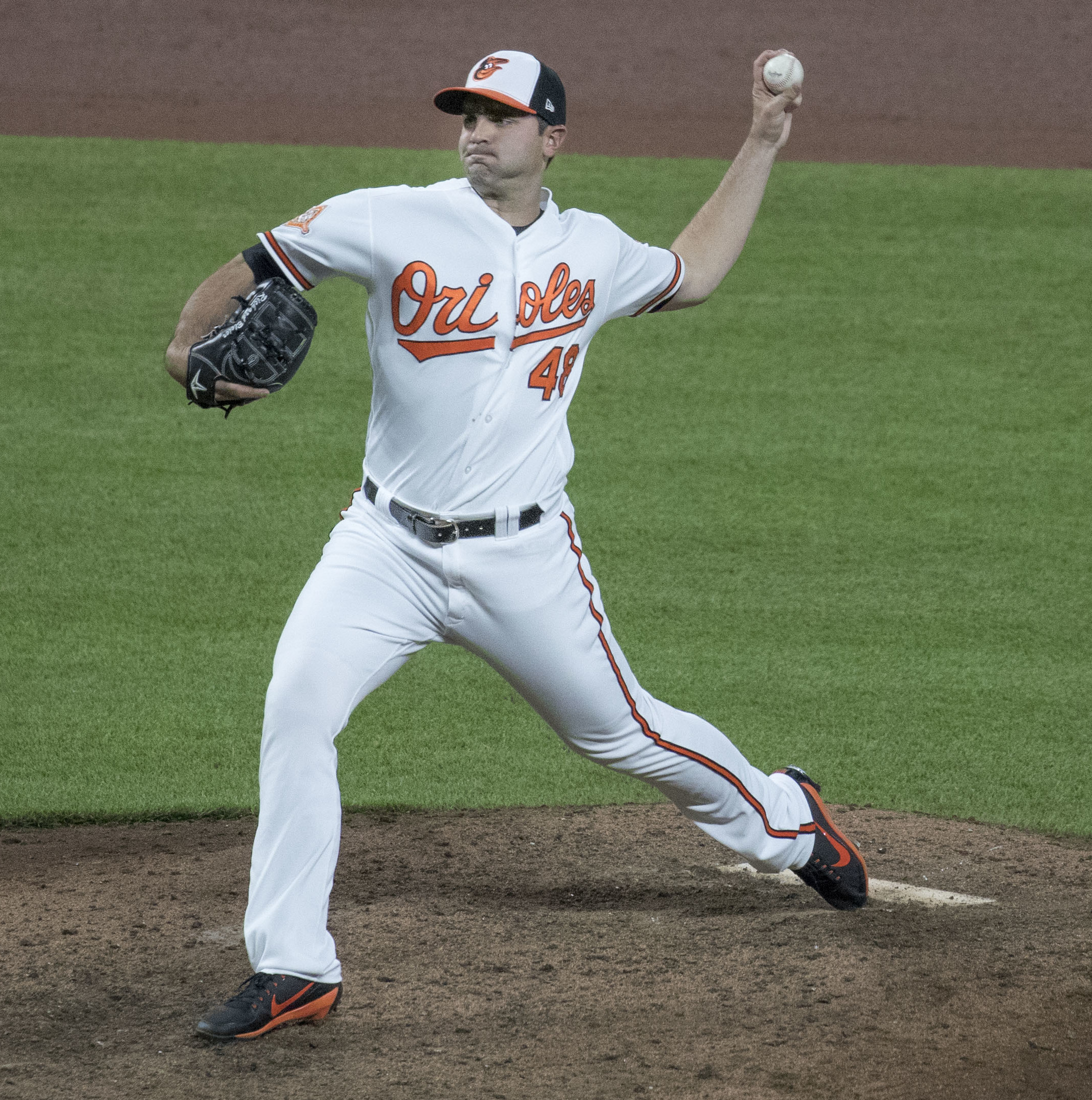
Bleier with the Orioles in 2017

On February 21, 2017, the Yankees traded Bleier to the Baltimore Orioles for a player to be named later or cash considerations. Bleier began the 2017 season pitching for the Norfolk Tides of the AAA International League.

The Orioles promoted Bleier to the major leagues after he posted an ERA of 0.61 in 14.2 innings over eight games, in which he did not give up a walk. One appearance after being handed his first career loss, Bleier tossed 1 2/3 scoreless innings in extra innings for his first career victory, against the Detroit Tigers. Bleier had a solid first half for the Orioles, with a 1.45 ERA in 30 1/3 innings, over 25 relief appearances. Through August 4, Bleier had the lowest ERA (1.56) in the American League of all pitchers with 40 innings pitched. At the same time—pitching to contact—he had averaged 4.02 strikeouts-per-9-innings, the lowest average of all such AL pitchers.

In 57 relief appearances in 2017, he was 2–1 with three holds and had a 1.99 ERA. Bleier averaged 3.69 strikeouts per nine innings, the lowest average of all AL pitchers who had pitched 60 innings or more, and batters he faced averaged 3.45 pitches per plate appearance, the second-lowest average among all such AL pitchers. He induced ground balls 68.8% of the time, the second-highest rate among all relievers in baseball. Batters only hit barrels against him 2.7% of the time (in the lowest 3% of major league pitchers), and he walked only 4.9% of batters (in the lowest 5% of major league pitchers).

==== 2018 ====
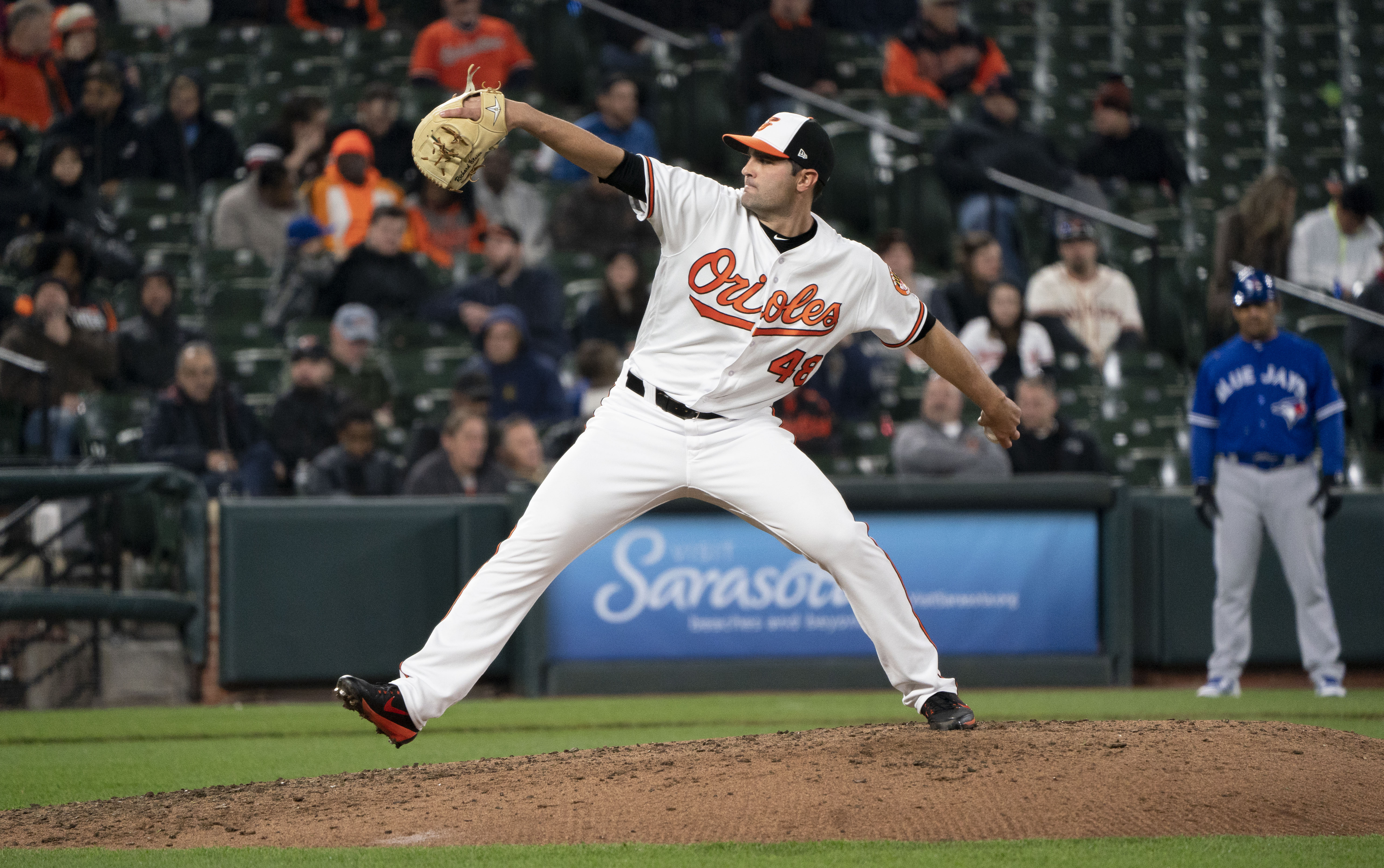
Bleier with the Orioles in 2018

In April 2018, Sam Miller wrote in ESPN: "Bleier has ... the best [career] ERA+ in major league history, minimum 95 innings." A few days later Jon Meoli wrote in The Baltimore Sun: "By one measurement, Richard Bleier is the best statistical pitcher to ever toe the major league rubber. He knows that by the relatively arbitrary measurement of pitchers with 101 big league innings or more, his 242 ERA+ was the best... His raw ERA [1.78] is the best in baseball history for that qualifier as well."

On June 13, Bleier left a game with an injury later diagnosed as a grade 3 lat tear on his left side. The injury required surgical repair that ended Bleier's season; there was a chance he could be ready to pitch in spring training in 2019.

In 31 relief appearances in 2018, Bleier was 3–0 with 9 holds and a 1.93 ERA, and averaged 1.1 walks per nine innings as he allowed four walks (one intentionally). Bleier averaged 4.13 strikeouts per nine innings, the fourth-lowest average of all AL pitchers who had pitched 30 innings or more. Batters he faced averaged 3.40 pitches per plate appearance, the second-lowest average among all such AL pitchers, and averaged 21.2% hard-hit balls, the third-lowest percentage among all such AL pitchers..

For his career through 2018, Bleier was 5–1 with a 1.97 ERA in 111 games. His 1.97 ERA for the seasons 2016–18 was the second-lowest in major league baseball (behind Zach Britton; 1.86), of all pitchers with 100 or more innings pitched, as his strikeout percentage (11.0%) was the lowest of such pitchers in major league baseball. He had a salary of $556,000 and was to be eligible for arbitration in 2020 and to be a free agent in 2023.

==== 2019–20 ====
Bleier returned from his lat muscle surgery in 2019 and was on the injured list from April 10 to May 16 with left shoulder tendinitis. He struggled at first but improved as the season progressed.

He finished the 2019 season 3–0 with four saves (the first of his major league career), five holds, and a 5.37 ERA in 53 appearances (one start, the first in his career after 159 major league relief appearances), though Bleier had a much better 3.68 ERA after the All Star break, and in 12 September appearances he had a 2.92 ERA and an 0.717 WHIP as batters hit just .180 against him. He walked only 3.4% of batters (in the lowest 2% of major league pitchers), and batters only hit barrels against him 3.1% of the time (in the lowest 3% of major league pitchers). He also had some of the worst batted-ball luck on ground balls in the American League, and after a dugout shouting match about defensive positioning with infield coach José David Flores, he played in front of an infield that was not shifted for the final month of the season, and saw his results further improve.

The Orioles agreed to a one-year contract with Bleier for $915,000 for the 2020 season. In two relief appearances for the Orioles in 2020, he was 0–0 with an 0.00 ERA.

=== Miami Marlins (2020–22) ===
==== 2020 ====
Bleier was traded from Baltimore to the Miami Marlins on July 31, 2020, in a transaction that was completed seven weeks later when the Orioles received minor league shortstop Isaac De León on September 18. In the pandemic-shortened 2020 season, with Baltimore and Miami combined, Bleier was 1–1 with 6 holds, a 2.16 ERA, and a 1.08 WHIP in 16.2 innings over 21 games.

==== 2021 ====
In 2021, Bleier was 3–2 with 20 holds (10th in the NL), a 2.95 ERA, and an 0.98 WHIP. In a career-high 68 games he pitched 58 innings and averaged 0.93 walks per nine innings (the lowest rate in the NL); of the six walks that he gave up, three were intentional walks. He also had a ground ball percentage of 65.5% (tops in the NL), a fly ball percentage of 14.9% (lowest in the NL), a first-ball-strike percentage of 71.1% (highest in the NL), a strikeout/walk ratio of 7.33 (second-best in the league behind Jacob DeGrom), and induced a swing percentage at pitches outside the strike zone of 42.1% (second-highest in the NL, again behind DeGrom). Batters only hit barrels against him 4.1% of the time (in the lowest 5% of major league pitchers), and swung with a 36.7% chase rate (in the top 2% of major league pitchers).

On July 20, 2021, he was ejected for the first time in his career, as a result of flipping off the umpires. Bleier had disagreed with a HBP call on Alcides Escobar, believing that Escobar had swung at the pitch.

Of major league pitchers who had pitched 240 or more innings from 2016 to 2021, Bleier was 2nd in fewest walks per nine innings (1.41), 3rd in fewest home runs per nine innings (0.58), fewest strikeouts per nine innings (5.02), lowest fly ball percentage (18.7%), and 4th in ground ball percentage (63.5%).

==== 2022 ====
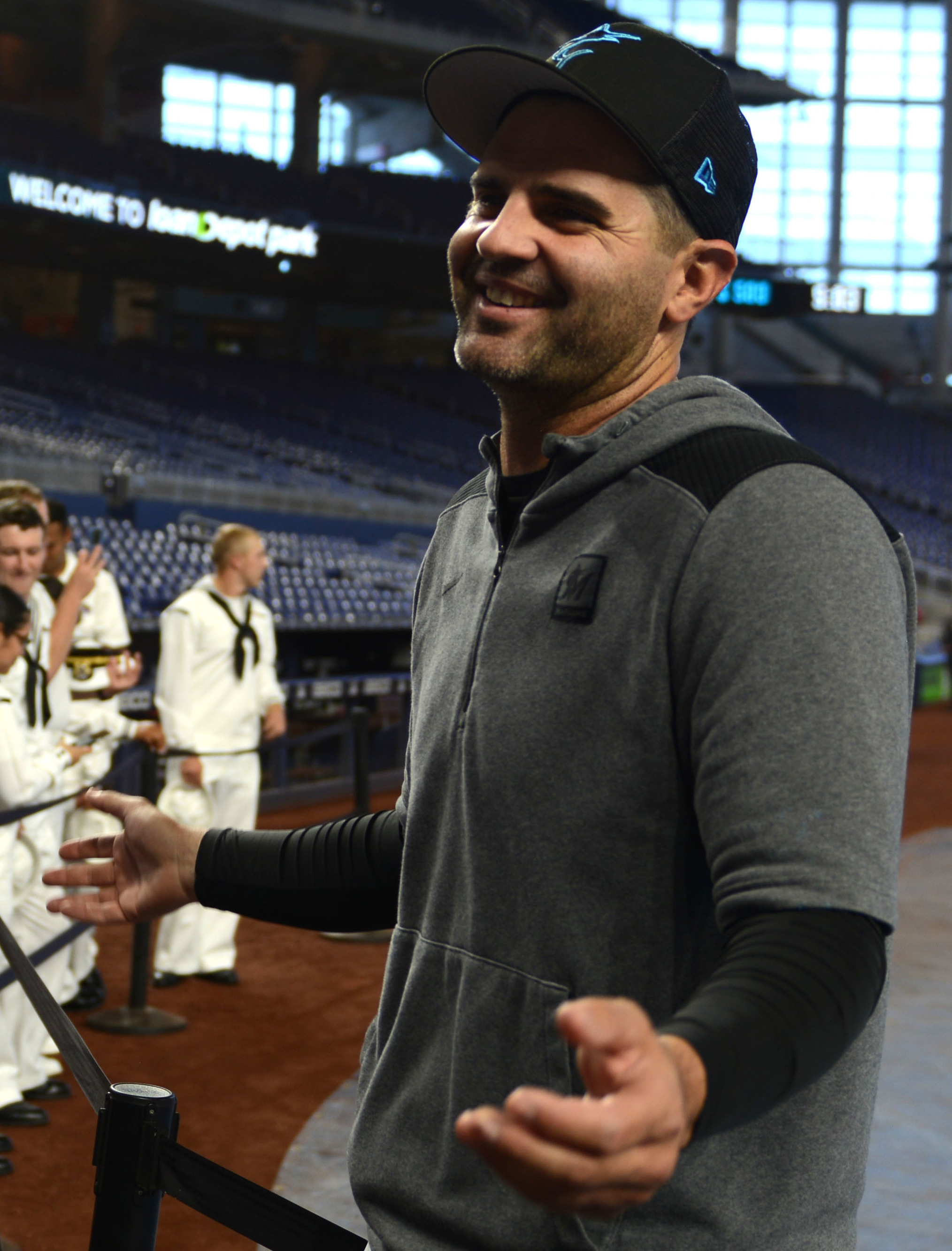
Bleier before a game at LoanDepot Park in 2022

On March 21, 2022, the Marlins signed Bleier to a two-year, $6 million extension ($2.25 million in 2022, and $3.5 million in 2023), avoiding arbitration. The deal included a $3.75 million club option for 2024, and a $250,000 buyout.

Bleier was called for a balk by first-base umpire John Tumpane three times—in a single plate appearance. It was as he faced Pete Alonso, allowing Jeff McNeil to score from first base in the eighth inning of a 6–4 win over the New York Mets at Citi Field on September 27, 2022. He had never been called for a balk in his MLB career previously, over the course of 303 games in seven seasons. It was the first time since at least 1900 that one pitcher was called for a balk three times in a single plate appearance. Manager Don Mattingly was ejected from the game for arguing, and Bleier was also ejected from the game at the end of the inning for arguing with the umpires. CBS Sports opined: "Some balks are obvious. Those are not... You almost have to be looking for a reason to call a balk to ring Bleier up on that motion three – again, three! – times in a single inning."

For the 2022 season, Bleier was 2–2 with one save, seven holds, and a 3.55 ERA in 50 games (one start) covering 50.2 innings in which he gave up 10 walks (3 intentional). He induced a 52.5% ground ball rate, and 0.53 home runs per nine innings. In 2022, he relied primarily on his heavy sinker (90 mph; 49% of the time) and cutter (87 mph), mixing in a slider (78 mph) and changeup (83 mph), with a rare heavy-sinking four-seam fastball (91 mph).

Since 1990, Bleier had the third-lowest career walk rate (4%) among relievers with at least 250 innings pitched. In his career through 2022, with two outs and runners in scoring position, he had held batters to a .231 batting average and .286 slugging percentage, not allowing any home runs when facing 168 batters.

=== Boston Red Sox (2023) ===
On January 30, 2023, the Marlins traded Bleier to the Boston Red Sox in exchange for former All-Star closing pitcher Matt Barnes. Bleier opened the season as a member of Boston's bullpen, until being placed on the injured list on May 22 due to left shoulder inflammation. He returned to the team two months later, on July 17. Bleier's struggles continued, and he was designated for assignment on August 7. On August 9, the Red Sox announced that Bleier had been released after clearing waivers. Red Sox manager Alex Cora said: "It just didn’t work out.... Lately, it’s been bad luck — a lot of ground balls getting through (the infield). He was banged up, he was hurt." In 27 games with the Red Sox, Bleier was 1–0 after pitching 30 2/3 innings while striking out 16 and posting a 5.28 ERA, with a 3.8% walk rate and a 55.2% ground ball rate. Career-wise, Bleier had a 3.27 ERA in 330.1 innings, a 3.9% walk rate, and a 60.9% ground ball rate.

=== Chicago Cubs (2023) ===
On August 17, 2023, Bleier signed a minor league contract with the Chicago Cubs organization. Bleier posted a 6.35 ERA in five appearances for the Triple–A Iowa Cubs before he was released by Chicago on August 30.

=== Washington Nationals (2024) ===
On February 1, 2024, Bleier signed a minor league contract with the Washington Nationals. In 15 games for the Triple–A Rochester Red Wings, he logged a 4.32 ERA with 10 strikeouts across 16 2/3 innings pitched. On May 14, Bleier opted out of his contract and became a free agent.

He announced his retirement on Instagram on February 11, 2025.

== Team Israel; World Baseball Classic ==
=== 2012 ===
In 2012, Bleier, by virtue of his Jewish heritage, played for the Israel national baseball team in the qualifying rounds of the 2013 World Baseball Classic. He pitched one scoreless inning over the course of two appearances. After not pitching in the first game, Bleier got the only batter he faced in the second game and was credited with a hold. During the third and final game, Bleier recorded two outs while walking two, and was again credited with a hold.

Bleier turned down Israel's offer to once again play for Israel at the World Baseball Classic main tournament because he was trying to win a job in spring training in the Orioles' bullpen. He said: "It was really appealing to me to do it again. I wanted to represent Israel in the Classic. But I feel like I have such a small window at this point in my career. I didn't get to the big leagues until I was 29. I felt I should do whatever I could to get as much big league time as I can with what little time I have left."

=== 2023 ===
Bleier pitched for Team Israel in the 2023 World Baseball Classic. He appeared in two games during the tournament, pitching to a 1–0 record, allowing one hit and four strikeouts over 2 2/3 scoreless innings.

== See also ==
- List of Jewish Major League Baseball players
- Rule 5 draft results
