= Joe Negron =

American politician

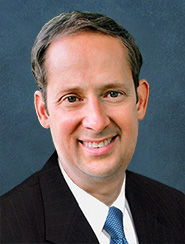
- Official portrait, 2002

President of the Florida Senate
- In office November 22, 2016 – November 20, 2018
- Preceded by: Andy Gardiner
- Succeeded by: Bill Galvano

Member of the Florida Senate
- In office October 7, 2009 – November 6, 2018; Joseph Abruzzo (25th)
- Succeeded by: Nancy Detert (28th); Lauren Book (32nd); Gayle Harrell (25th)
- Constituency: 28th district (2009–2012); 32nd district (2012–2016); 25th district (2016–2018)

Member of the Florida House of Representatives from the 82nd district
- In office November 7, 2000 – November 7, 2006
- Preceded by: Art Argenio
- Succeeded by: William Snyder

Personal details
- Born: Joseph Negron Jr. October 9, 1961 (age 65) West Palm Beach, Florida, U.S.
- Party: Republican
- Spouse: Rebecca Horton
- Children: 3
- Education: Stetson University (BA); Emory University (JD); Harvard University (MPA)
- Occupation: Politician

Joseph Negron Jr. (born October 9, 1961) is a Republican politician from Florida, United States. He served as a member of the Florida Senate from 2009 to 2018, representing parts of the Treasure Coast. In his last two years in office, he served as Senate President. Previously, Negron served three terms in the Florida House of Representatives, representing the Martin County-based 82nd district from 2000 to 2006.

== History ==
Negron was born in West Palm Beach. His parents left Cuba during the revolution and found work in a cigar factory in metro Miami. He was the first to graduate high school since no one in his family went to school. He attended Stetson University, where he served as the editor-in-chief of the student newspaper and graduated with his bachelor's degree in 1983. He then attended the Emory University Law School, receiving his Juris Doctor in 1986, and received a Zuckerman Fellowship to attend Harvard University, receiving his Master of Public Administration in 2009. Following his graduation from law school, Negron worked as a private practice attorney in Stuart, specializing in business litigation and land use law.

== Florida House of Representatives ==
In 1999, when State Representative Tom Warner resigned from his seat in the legislature to accept an appointment as the state's first solicitor general, a special election was held to replace him in the 82nd District, which included parts of southern Martin County and northern Palm Beach County. Negron ran to replace him, and faced Art Argenio, John Whitescarver, Melinda Tumminia, and John Carroll in the Republican primary. Negron placed first in the primary, winning 47% of the vote to Argenio's 30%, but because he did not win a majority, a runoff election was held that Argenio narrowly won with 52% of the vote. When Argenio ran for re-election in 2000, Negron once again challenged him in the primary, along with David Traill, and received a plurality of the vote, thus necessitating another runoff election. During the course of the campaign, the two candidates signed an agreement aimed at stopping the personal attacks on one another. Though both agreed that water discharge from Lake Okeechobee was harming the St. Lucie River, they disagreed on the solution to the problem; Argenio indicated that he would introduce legislation to set a maximum depth of the lake, which Negron blasted, arguing, "I don't think [a] legislator should be setting feet and inches of a lake. Can you imagine the chaos that would ensue if water managers who need flexibility can't make adjustments to the water level? I think it's nuts." The two also disagreed on health care policy, with Negron suggesting that patients should be able to sue HMOs and announcing that he would sponsor legislation that would allow patients to see specialists without approval from their primary care physician, and Argenio calling Negron's plans a "lawyer's bill of rights." Ultimately, Negron narrowly defeated Argenio to win the Republican nomination for the seat, and was unopposed in the general election. He won re-election uncontested in 2002 and 2004 as well.

== 2006 congressional campaign ==
Negron initially planned on running for Attorney General of Florida in 2006, but, citing an inability to compete with former Congressman Bill McCollum in the Republican primary, dropped out of the race. However, following Republican Congressman Mark Foley's resignation from Congress following a scandal, he was tapped by Republicans to replace Foley as their nominee in the 16th Congressional District, which stretched from Wellington to Port Charlotte, against Democratic nominee Tim Mahoney, despite the fact that Foley's name would remain on the ballot. Over the course of the campaign, the Sarasota Herald-Tribune endorsed Mahoney over Negron, citing his business experience and his moderate issue positions. When elections supervisors proposed putting signs in voting booths informing voters that any votes cast for Foley would be received by Negron, the Florida Democratic Party sued, arguing that it constituted an unfair advantage for Negron. An appeals court rejected the lawsuit, but required the Secretary of State of Florida to provide voters with a notice that any votes cast for Foley would be received by Negron, and any votes cast for Mahoney would be received by Mahoney. Ultimately, Negron narrowly lost to Mahoney by just four thousand votes, receiving 48% of the vote to Mahoney's 50%.

== Florida Senate ==
When Ken Pruitt resigned from his seat in the Florida Senate, Negron ran in the special election to replace him in the 28th District, which included eastern Indian River County, Martin County, northern Palm Beach County, and southern St. Lucie County. Negron was initially set to face former State Representative Art Argenio, whom he defeated in 2000, in the Republican primary, but Argenio withdrew, allowing Negron to win the nomination unopposed. He faced Bill Ramos, the Democratic nominee, in the general election, and campaigned on protecting the St. Lucie River, promoting biotechnology, and increasing education spending, declaring, "I'm looking forward to working hard to continue building on the foundation that Senator Ken Pruitt built with the research coast." He ran for re-election in 2010 and was elected unopposed. During the 2011 legislative session, Negron introduced legislation that aimed to reduce witness misidentifications by changing the procedure by which witnesses were shown photographs; under Negron's proposal, witnesses would be shown one photograph at a time by a person who did not know the identity of the real suspect. He argued that his proposed changes would increase the number of guilty people convicted and reduce the number of innocent people convicted, arguing, "Once you get picked out of a lineup, the odds of you being convicted is nearly 100 percent."

In 2012, following the reconfiguration of the state's legislative districts, Negron was moved into the 32nd District, where he ran for re-election. He was opposed by Ray D'Amiano, a businessman and the Democratic nominee, who raised little money, and was attacked by D'Amiano for the amount of money he was raising. The Palm Beach Post endorsed Negron, praising him as one of the legislature's "most influential Republican leaders" and "one of his party's more thoughtful and moderating voices." They noted, however, "We hope Sen. Negron does modify his position on many issues, from the expansion of Medicaid to the need to tax Internet sales to pay for priorities like public education." Negron ended up defeating D'Amiano by a wide margin, receiving 60% of the vote to D'Amiano's 40%.

Negron's district was again reconfigured and renumbered after court-ordered redistricting in 2016.

Joe Negron has received an A+ rating from the National Rifle Association.

Negron resigned early, at the end of his two-year presidency, rather than serve out the remainder of his four-year term.

Florida House of Representatives
Preceded by Art Argenio	Member of the Florida House of Representatives from the 82nd district 2000–2006	Succeeded by William Snyder
Florida Senate
Preceded by Ken Pruitt	Member of the Florida Senate from the 28th district 2009–2012	Succeeded by Nancy Detert
Preceded by Jeremy Ring	Member of the Florida Senate from the 32nd district 2012–2016	Succeeded by Lauren Book
Preceded by Joseph Abruzzo	Member of the Florida Senate from the 25th district 2016–2018	Succeeded by Gayle Harrell
Political offices
Preceded by Andy Gardiner	President of the Florida Senate; 2016–2018	Succeeded by Bill Galvano
