= Liesa Priddy =

American politician

Member of the Florida House of Representatives from the 82nd district
- Incumbent
- Assumed office November 3, 2026
- Preceded by: Lauren Melo

Personal details
- Party: Republican
- Website: Campaign website

Liesa Priddy is an American politician. A member of the Republican Party, she has served in the Florida House of Representatives since 2026, representing the 82nd district. She is a rancher.
