= Jacott =

Jacott is a surname. Notable people with the surname include:

- Carlos Jacott (born 1967), American actor
- Ruth Jacott (born 1960), Surinamese-Dutch singer

== See also ==
- Jacot
