= MaryLynn Magar =

American politician

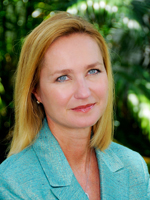

Speaker pro tempore of the Florida House of Representatives
- In office November 20, 2018 – November 3, 2020
- Preceded by: Jeanette Nuñez
- Succeeded by: Bryan Avila

Member of the Florida House of Representatives from the 82nd district
- In office November 6, 2012 – November 3, 2020
- Preceded by: William Snyder
- Succeeded by: John Snyder

Personal details
- Born: July 5, 1963 (age 63) Pittsburgh, Pennsylvania, U.S.
- Party: Republican
- Education: Radford University (BS)

MaryLynn Magar (born July 6, 1963) is an American politician from Florida. She was a Republican member of the Florida House of Representatives, representing the 82nd District, including most of Martin County and some parts of northern Palm Beach County, from 2012 to 2020.

Magar was born in Pittsburgh, Pennsylvania, and attended Radford University, where she graduated with a bachelor's degree in 1985. She and her husband moved to the state of Florida in the early 1990s, and she took a job with Heart Care Imaging, where she works as the Vice-President and the General Manager. Magar served as a Republican State Committeewoman from Martin County from 2000 to 2012 when she first ran for the legislature.

== Florida House of Representatives ==
When incumbent State Representative William Snyder opted to run for Martin County Sheriff rather than seek another term, Magar ran to succeed him. In the Republican primary, she faced former State Representative Carl Domino, Jonathan Pasqualone, Calvin Turnquest, and Jonathan Milton. Though Domino had previously served in the legislature, Magar managed to earn the endorsements of United States Congressman Tom Rooney, State Senator Joe Negron, and Florida Right to Life. She campaigned on not voting for any tax or fee increases, declaring, "I think it's irresponsible for the state to keep spending more money. We need to keep money in the pockets of people who work and create jobs." Magar ended up winning the primary election, receiving 42% of the vote to Domino's 31%, Pasqualone's 13%, Turnquest's 7%, and Milton's 7%. In the general election, she faced only write-in opposition and won her first term in the legislature with 99% of the vote.

Magar was term-limited from the House in 2020, after serving four terms.

Florida House of Representatives
Preceded by William Snyder	Member of the Florida House of Representatives from the 82nd district 2012–2020	Succeeded by Toby Overdorf
Preceded by Jeanette Nuñez	Speaker pro tempore of the Florida House of Representatives; 2018–2020	Succeeded by Bryan Avila
