= Mimi McAndrews =

American politician (born 1956)

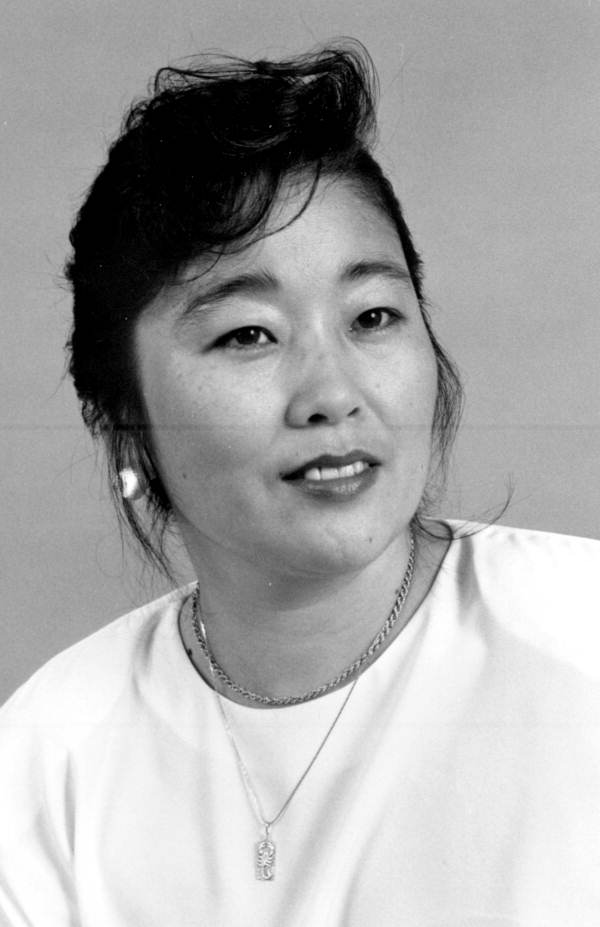

Member of the Florida House of Representatives from the 85th district
- In office November 3, 1992 – November 8, 1994
- Preceded by: Ray Liberti (redistricting)
- Succeeded by: Lois Frankel

Personal details
- Born: October 28, 1956 (age 69) St. Joseph, Missouri
- Party: Democratic
- Children: 2
- Education: Florida Atlantic University (B.A.); Georgetown University Law Center (J.D.)
- Occupation: Attorney

Mimi McAndrews (born October 28, 1956) is a Democratic politician from Florida who served as a member of the Florida House of Representatives from the 85th district from 1992 to 1994. She was the first Asian-American woman to serve in the Florida Legislature.

== Early life ==
McAndrews was born in St. Joseph, Missouri, and was adopted when she was two months old. She moved to Florida in 1974 and worked at a department store and Japanese steakhouse before opening a sushi restaurant near Boca Raton. McAndrews then attended attended Florida Atlantic University, graduating with her bachelor's degree in 1988. She was a legislative aide to State Representative Lois Frankel before attending Georgetown University Law Center, graduating with her Juris Doctor in 1992.

== Florida House of Representatives ==
In 1992, when State Representative Ray Liberti declined to seek re-election, McAndrews ran to succeed him in the renumbered 85th district. She faced political consultant Mark Hayes in the Democratic primary, and won the endorsement of the Sun Sentinel and Miami Herald. The Sentinel praised her "solid grounding from her work with Frankel," while the Herald noted that she was "well informed and thoughtful." McAndrews narrowly defeated Hayes in the primary, winning 51 percent of the vote to his 49 percent.

McAndrews faced Republican nominee Remzey Samarrai, an insurance agent, and Populist nominee J.D. Self in the general election. She defeated both by a wide margin, winning 56 percent of the vote to Samarrai's 36 percent and Self's 7 percent.

In 1994, McAndrews ran for re-election to a second term. She was challenged in the primary by former State Representative Lois Frankel, who left the legislature in 1992 to unsuccessfully run for Congress. Frankel had initially filed in the neighboring 86th district with the expectation that State Representative Ed Healey would retire, but when he ran for re-election, Frankel switched to the 86th district. During the campaign, Healey and McAndrews alleged that Frankel tried to offer them jobs to get them to leave their respective races, which she denied. Frankel ultimately defeated McAndrews by a wide margin, receiving 64 percent of the vote to her 36 percent.

== Post-legislative career ==
After leaving the legislature, McAndrews worked as an attorney and became the executive director of the South Florida chapter of the National Safety Council.

McAndrews ran for the Palm Beach County Commission in 1998 from the 6th district after Commissioner Ken Foster declined to seek re-election. She won the Democratic nomination unopposed and faced Royal Palm Beach Mayor Tony Masilotti, the Republican nominee, in the general election. She lost to Masilotti by a wide margin, receiving 43 percent of the vote to his 57 percent.
