= Jacquot =

Jacquot (English: /ʒɑːˈkoʊ/, French: [ʒako]) is a French surname. Notable people with the surname include:

- Benoît Jacquot (born 1947), French film director
- Charles Jean-Baptiste Jacquot (1812–1880), French writer better known by his pen name Eugène de Mirecourt
- Georges Jacquot (1794–1874), French sculptor of the 19th century
- Joe Jacquot, Deputy Attorney General of the state of Florida, USA
- Martine L. Jacquot (born 1955), French-born Canadian academic, novelist, poet, short story writer, journalist
- Rene Jacquot (born 1961), French professional boxer and world title holder

== See also ==
- Jacot
