= Art Argenio =

American politician (born 1959)

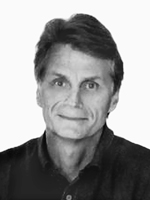

Member of the Florida House of Representatives from the 82nd district
- In office November 3, 1999 – November 7, 2000
- Preceded by: Tom Warner
- Succeeded by: Joe Negron

Personal details
- Born: June 7, 1959 (age 67) Woodland Park, New Jersey
- Party: Republican
- Education: Montclair State College (B.S.); Life University (D.C.)
- Occupation: Chiropractic physician

Arthur Argenio (born June 7, 1959) is a Republican politician and chiropractic physician who served as a member of the Florida House of Representatives from 1999 to 2000.

== Early life and career ==
Argenio was born in West Paterson, New Jersey (since renamed to Woodland Park) and attended Passaic Valley Regional High School. He attended Montclair State College and Life University and received his doctor of chiropractic degree in 1984. He moved to Florida in 1994 and established his practice in Hobe Sound.

== Florida House of Representatives ==
In 1998, Argenio ran for the Florida House of Representatives, challenging incumbent Republican State Representative Tom Warner for renomination in the 82nd District, which included parts of Martin County and northern Palm Beach County. Warner won re-election in a landslide, receiving 60 percent of the vote to Argento's 33 percent.

Warner did not serve out his full term, however, and resigned in 1999 to become the first Solicitor General of Florida under Democratic Attorney General Bob Butterworth. Governor Jeb Bush subsequently scheduled a special election, and Argenio announced that he would run. He faced a crowded Republican primary that included attorney Joe Negron, businesswoman Melinda Medina Tumminia, nonprofit executive John Whitescarver, and newspaper publisher John Carroll.

In the primary election, held on September 21, 1999, Negron placed first with 48 percent of the vote, with Argenio in second with 30 percent. However, because Negron did not receive a majority of the vote, a runoff election was held on October 5. Argenio attacked Negron for opposing tort reform and narrowly defeated him in the runoff, winning 52 percent of the vote to Negron's 48 percent.

Argenio faced former U.S. State Department employee Cara Scherer, the Democratic nominee, in the general election. He defeated Scherer by a narrow margin, receiving 52 percent of the vote.

In 2000, Argenio ran for re-election. He was challenged in the Republican primary by Negron, Martin County School Board Chairman Tony George, and high school teacher David Traill, though George ultimately dropped out of the race. in the primary, Negron won first place with 41 percent of the vote, with Argenio at 39 and Traill winning 20 percent. Argenio and Negron again advanced to a runoff election, which Negron won with 54 percent of the vote.

== Post-legislative career ==
In 2009, following the resignation of Republican State Senator Ken Pruitt in 2009, a special election was called to replace him in the 28th District, which included much of Arsenio's previous House district. Argenio announced that he would run in the special election against Negron, but ultimately dropped out of the race, enabling Negron to win the Republican primary unopposed.

Argenio intended to challenge Negron in the 2010 election, but instead ran against incumbent Republican State Representative Debbie Mayfield in the 80th District. Mayfield defeated Argenio by a wide margin, winning 52 percent of the vote to Argenio's 34 percent.
