= Jacot =

Jacot is a surname. Notable people with the surname include:

- Adam Jacot de Boinod (born 1960), British author
- Christopher Jacot (born 1979), Canadian actor
- Francis Jacot (born 1956), Swiss cross-country skier
- Michèle Jacot (born 1952), French alpine skier
- Monique Jacot (born 1934), Swiss photographer, photojournalist
- Thierry Jacot (born 1961), Swiss swimmer

== See also ==
- Jacquot
- Jacox
