= Scott Makar =

American academic and judge

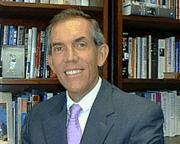

Judge of the Florida Fifth District Court of Appeal
- In office 2023–current

Judge of the Florida First District Court of Appeal
- In office 2012–2023

Solicitor General of Florida
- In office 2007–2012
- Attorney General: Bill McCollum; Pam Bondi
- Preceded by: Chris Kise
- Succeeded by: Timothy Osterhaus

Personal details
- Born: October 15, 1959 (age 66) Mahopac, New York, U.S.
- Party: Independent
- Spouse: Nancy Hogshead-Makar
- Children: 3
- Education: Mercer University (BS); University of Florida (MA, MBA, JD, PhD)
- Occupation: Judge, Attorney, Teacher

Scott Douglas Makar (born October 15, 1959) is an American lawyer, college professor and Judge on Florida's Fifth District Court of Appeal, recommissioned from the First District Court of Appeal on January 1, 2023, by Governor Ron DeSantis. Previously he was the Florida Solicitor General serving from 2007 until 2012 and in that position, argued five cases before the United States Supreme Court.

== Early years ==
Scott Makar was born on October 15, 1959, and his family moved to Holmes Beach, Florida in 1969. He graduated from Manatee High School in 1977.

== Education ==
Mr. Makar graduated from Mercer University in 1980 with a Bachelor of Science double majoring in mathematics & economics, magna cum laude. At the University of Florida, he received a Master of Business Administration in finance and Master of Arts in economics during 1982, then a Juris Doctor with honors in 1987 and finally, a Doctor of Philosophy in economics during 1993. Mr. Makar was founder and Editor-in-Chief of the University of Florida Journal of Law and Public Policy. He was also a member of the university of Florida Law Review and received the Gertrude Brick Award. Makar clerked for Judge Thomas Alonzo Clark on the Eleventh Circuit of the United States courts of appeals, and at the Antitrust Division for the United States Department of Justice, among others.

== Teaching ==
His love for academics prompted Makar to begin teaching undergraduate courses when he was in law school. He has taught law courses at the University of Florida, Florida Coastal School of Law, University of North Florida and Jacksonville University. Part of his position as Florida Solicitor General includes teaching at Florida State University.

== Lawyer ==
Makar was admitted to the Florida Bar on October 9, 1987. He joined Holland & Knight, LLP in 1989 and became a Capital Partner prior to his departure in 2001. He was hired as chief of the appellate division in the Office of General Counsel for the City of Jacksonville. He remained with the city for seven years.

Makar has also written law reviews and law journal articles on a broad range of topics, many of which have been cited by commentators and courts, with several garnering legal writing awards. He was appointed to the Florida Supreme Court's Standard Jury Instructions Committee (Civil) and currently serves as its chair emeritus. He served on the first Executive Council of the Florida Bar's Appellate Practice and Advocacy Section as a founding member. He also chaired the Appellate Practice Section of the Jacksonville Bar Association from 2001 to 2002.

== Solicitor ==
Makar was appointed as Florida Solicitor General by Florida Attorney General Bill McCollum on February 13, 2007. McCollum did not seek re-election in 2010, and Pam Bondi was elected Florida Attorney General. She retained Makar in the position, and he served as one of her senior advisers. As Florida Solicitor General, Makar oversaw civil appeals involving the state's interests in all state and federal appellate courts. He also held the Richard W. Ervin Eminent Scholar Chair in the Florida State University College of Law where he taught. His $165,000 salary was split between the state and FSU.

While Solicitor General, Makar argued cases before the Eleventh Circuit Court of Appeal, the Florida Supreme Court, the First District Court of Appeal, several Judicial Circuits, and United States Supreme Court.

=== US Supreme Court ===
Typically, a state's Solicitor General will only have a case before the US Supreme Court every other year; Makar argued Florida Department of Revenue v. Piccadilly Cafeteria in 2007–2008, and nothing occurred in the 2008–2009 term. Florida was party to five cases in 2009–2010, and Makar personally argued four of them. In an interview, Makar claimed that the cashier of the cafeteria in the U.S. Supreme Court building saw him so often that she assumed he work there, and offered him the employee discount. The cases were:

- Graham v. Florida and Sullivan v. Florida, (Juveniles sentenced to life without parole for non-homicide crimes) Graham won, Sullivan lost.
- Stop the Beach Renourishment Inc. v. Florida Department of Environmental Protection, (homeowners opposed beach renourishment which would establish their property boundary at the water line before renourishment, instead of the subsequent water's edge after renourishment) Stop the Beach lost.
- Holland v. Florida, (challenged the one-year statute of limitations under the AEDPA) Holland won.

Over 100 of his cases have been reported, covering diverse topics.

== Judge ==
On February 6, 2012, Florida Governor Rick Scott announced that he appointed Scott Makar to replace Paul Hawkes, who resigned over funding questions in the new First DCA "Taj Mahal" Courthouse. On February 23, 2012, Makar revealed that he would leave the Attorney General's office on March 23, 2012, to occupy the bench as a judge in the Florida First District Court of Appeal in Tallahassee. Other First DCA judges teach at various law schools, so Makar confirmed that he will probably do so, too.

Makar's official investiture as a member of the First District Court of Appeal was held on April 23, 2012. He was recommissioned to Florida's Fifth District Court of Appeal on January 1, 2023, by Governor Ron DeSantis.

== Personal life ==
He married the former Nancy Hogshead, who was a co-worker at Holland & Knight. His wife is a professor at Florida Coastal School of Law and 1984 Olympic Gold medalist in swimming. Their home is in Jacksonville, Florida, and they have a son, Aaron (2000), and twin daughters, Helen Clare & Millicent (2005). His wife and son were able to attend several of his oral arguments at the US Supreme Court.
