= Ray Liberti =

American politician

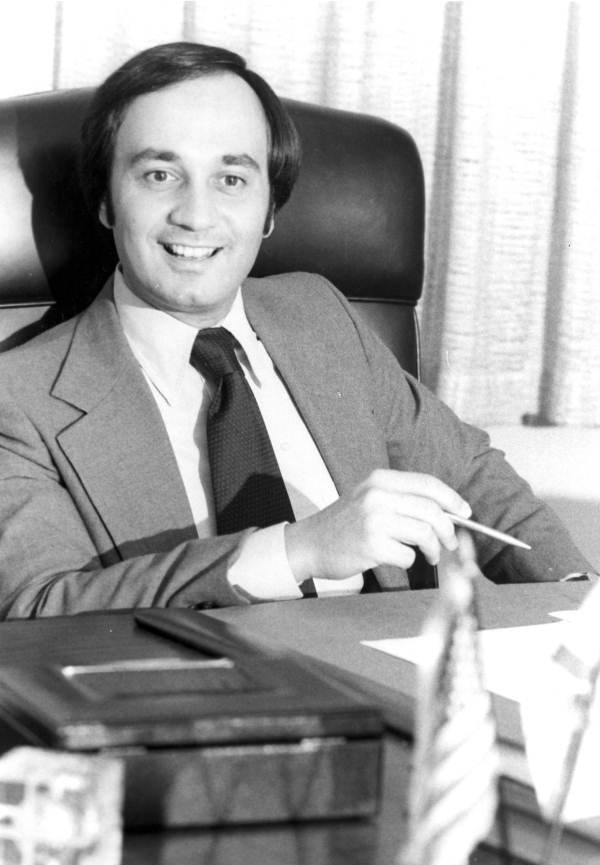
- Liberti in 1978

Member of the Florida House of Representatives from the 78th district
- In office 1978–1982
- Preceded by: Donald F. Hazelton
- Succeeded by: Dale Patchett

Member of the Florida House of Representatives from the 82nd district
- In office 1982–1992
- Preceded by: Doc Kimmel
- Succeeded by: Tom Warner

Personal details
- Born: 1945 or 1946 (age 79–80)
- Party: Democratic

Ray Liberti (born 1945/1946) is an American politician. He served as a Democratic member for the 78th and 82nd district of the Florida House of Representatives.

In 1978, Liberti won the election for the 78th district of the Florida House of Representatives. He succeeded Donald F. Hazelton. In 1982, Liberti was succeeded by Dale Patchett for the 78th district. In the same year, he won the election for the 82nd district of the Florida House of Representatives. Liberti succeeded Doc Kimmel. In 1992, Liberti was succeeded by Tom Warner for the 82nd district. In 2006, he was charged in the federal judiciary. In two cases, Liberti was entreated to not being guilty from a mail and wire fraud. He was then entreated to being guilty in a mail and wire fraud case.

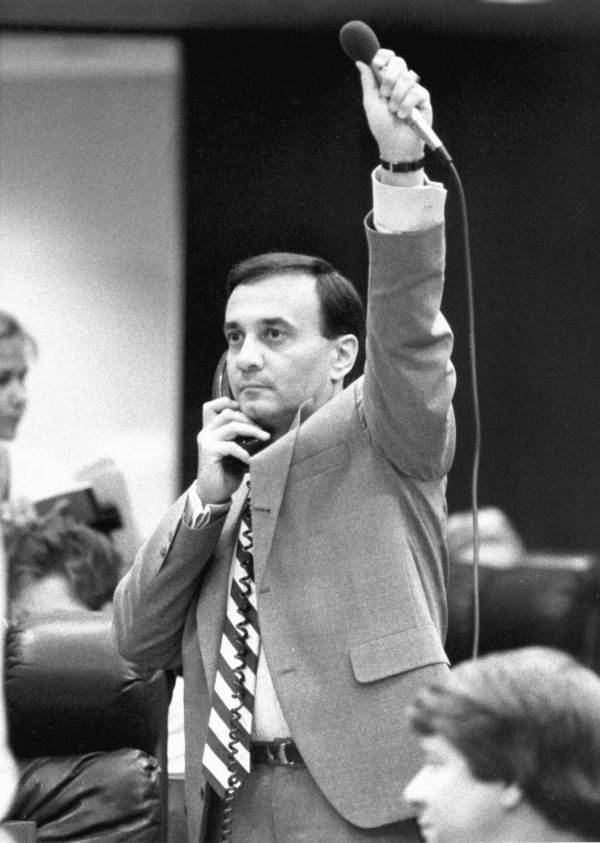
Liberti in 1987

Liberti served as a commissioner for the Republic Properties Corporation, where he had assisted to support the company.
