= Lois Frankel =

American politician and lawyer (born 1948)

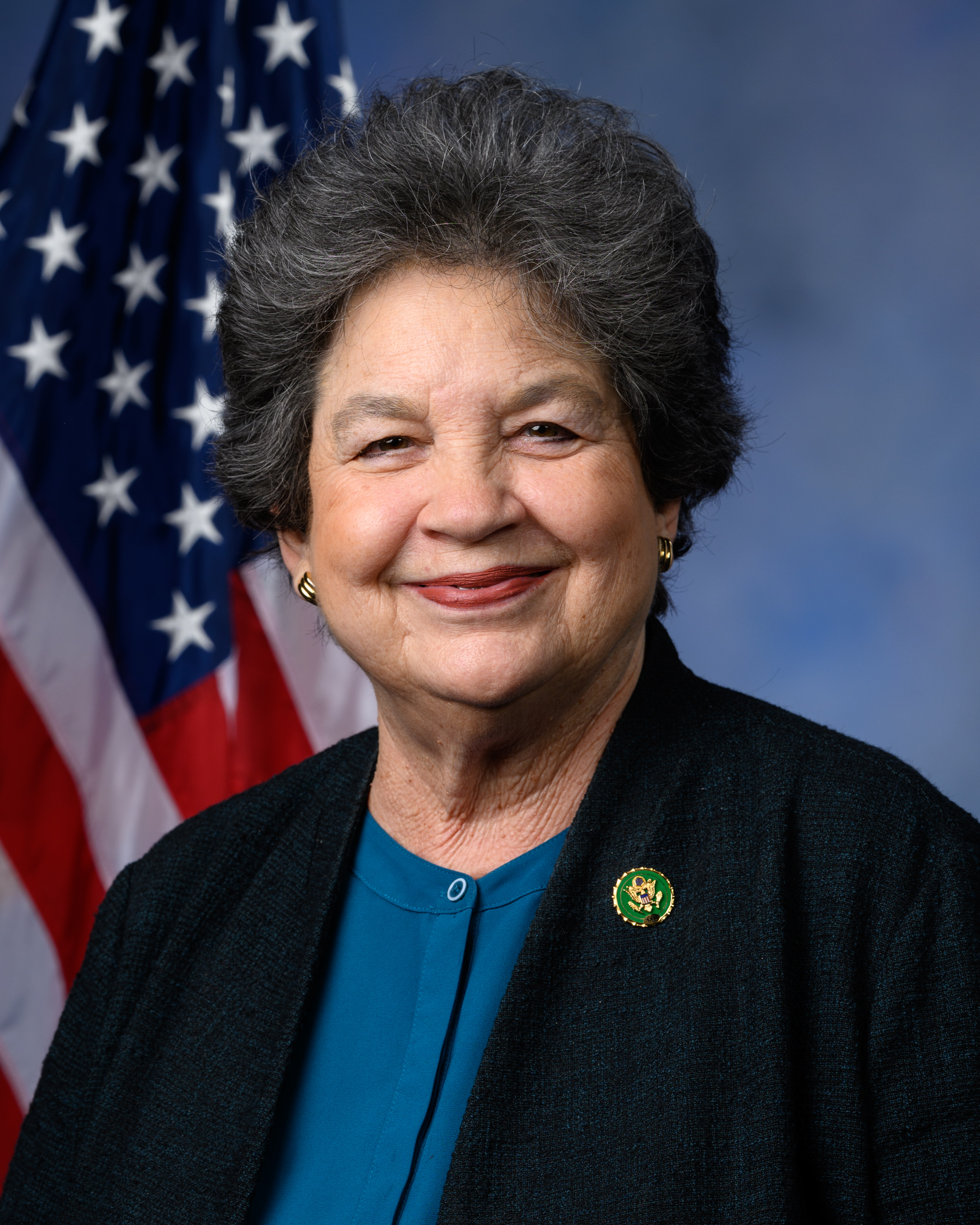
- Official portrait, 2023

Member of the U.S. House of Representatives from Florida
- Incumbent
- Assumed office January 3, 2013
- Preceded by: Allen West
- Constituency: 22nd district (2013–2017); 21st district (2017–2023); 22nd district (2023–present)

Mayor of West Palm Beach
- In office March 27, 2003 – March 31, 2011
- Preceded by: Joel T. Daves III
- Succeeded by: Jeri Muoio

Member of the Florida House of Representatives
- In office November 8, 1994 – November 5, 2002
- Preceded by: Mimi McAndrews
- Succeeded by: Shelley Vana
- Constituency: 85th district
- In office November 4, 1986 – November 3, 1992
- Preceded by: Eleanor Weinstock
- Succeeded by: Redistricted
- Constituency: 83rd district

Personal details
- Born: Lois Jane Frankel; May 16, 1948 (age 78) New York City, New York, U.S.
- Party: Democratic
- Education: Boston University (BA); Georgetown University (JD)
- Website: House website Campaign website
- Frankel's voice Frankel supporting the Speak Out Act. Recorded November 16, 2022

Lois Jane Frankel (/ˈfræŋkəl/ FRANG-kəl; born May 16, 1948) is an American politician and lawyer who has been the United States representative for Florida's 22nd congressional district since 2023, having previously served it from 2013 to 2017. As a member of the Democratic Party, she represented the 21st congressional district from 2017 to 2023, was a 7-term member of the Florida House of Representatives, and was mayor of West Palm Beach for two terms.

Frankel was a member of the Florida House for fourteen years, serving as Minority Whip and later Minority Leader of the Florida State House. She was elected mayor of West Palm Beach in 2003, serving two terms in office until leaving office in 2011 due to term limits. Frankel additionally ran unsuccessful campaigns to run for the US House of Representatives in 1992 and for Governor of Florida in 2002.

== Early life and education ==
Frankel was born to a Jewish family on May 16, 1948, in New York City and received a bachelor's degree from Boston University in 1970. She earned a Juris Doctor from Georgetown University Law Center in 1973. Frankel moved to West Palm Beach, Florida, in 1974.

== Florida House of Representatives (1987–2003) ==
=== Elections ===
In 1986 incumbent Democratic state representative Eleanor Weinstock of the 83rd district decided to run for a seat in the Florida Senate. Frankel ran for Weinstock's open seat in the Florida House and defeated Republican nominee Gerald Adams 69%–31%. In 1988 she won reelection to a second term unopposed; in 1990 she again was unopposed.

In November 1991 Frankel resigned as state representative to run for Congress in 1992. Mimi McAndrews, a former aide of Frankel's, was elected to replace her. Frankel lost to fellow Democratic representative Alcee Hastings in the 1992 congressional primary. In 1994 Frankel defeated McAndrews in the Democratic primary for her old State House seat. Frankel won the November general election with 55% of the vote. In 1996, she won reelection to a fifth term with 68% of the vote. In 1998 Frankel was reelected to a sixth term with 64% of the vote. In 2000 she was reelected to a seventh term with 63% of the vote.

=== Tenure ===
During her first period as a state legislator, Frankel was State House Majority Whip. While in office from 1995 to 2003, she became the first female House Minority Leader in Florida's history and co-authored a change to Florida's already existing AIDS omnibus law originally passed in 1988. She left office due to term limits in 2002 after serving 14 years in the State House.

=== Committee assignments ===
- Fiscal Responsibility Council
- AIDS Task Force (committee chair)
- Select Committee of the Whole
- Select Committee on Child Abuse & Neglect (committee chair)

== 1992 congressional election ==
In 1992 Frankel retired from the State House to run for the newly created Florida's 23rd district. In the Democratic primary she came in first with 35% of the vote, but failed to reach the 50% threshold necessary to win outright and avoid a runoff election. In the runoff, former U.S. District Court Judge Alcee Hastings defeated Frankel 57%–43%.

== 2002 gubernatorial election ==
In 2002, Frankel entered and then dropped out of the 2002 election for Governor of Florida, in which Governor Jeb Bush won re-election.

== Mayor of West Palm Beach (2003–2011) ==
On March 11, 2003, Frankel defeated incumbent Democratic West Palm Beach Mayor Joel T. Daves III in the mayoral election. She was endorsed in the race by former West Palm Beach Mayor Nancy Graham. Frankel won with 56% of the vote to Daves's 38%. She was sworn into office on March 27, 2003. In 2007 she was reelected, defeating Al Zucaro by 58%–42%.

On March 31, 2011, due to term limits, Frankel left office after two terms. In the race to succeed her, West Palm Beach city commissioner Jeri Muoio was elected that month with 51% of the vote, on a platform of business development and pension reform.

Frankel was also voted to be an at-large Florida delegate to the 2004 Democratic National Convention.

== U.S. House of Representatives ==
She is the chair of the Elect Democratic Women PAC.

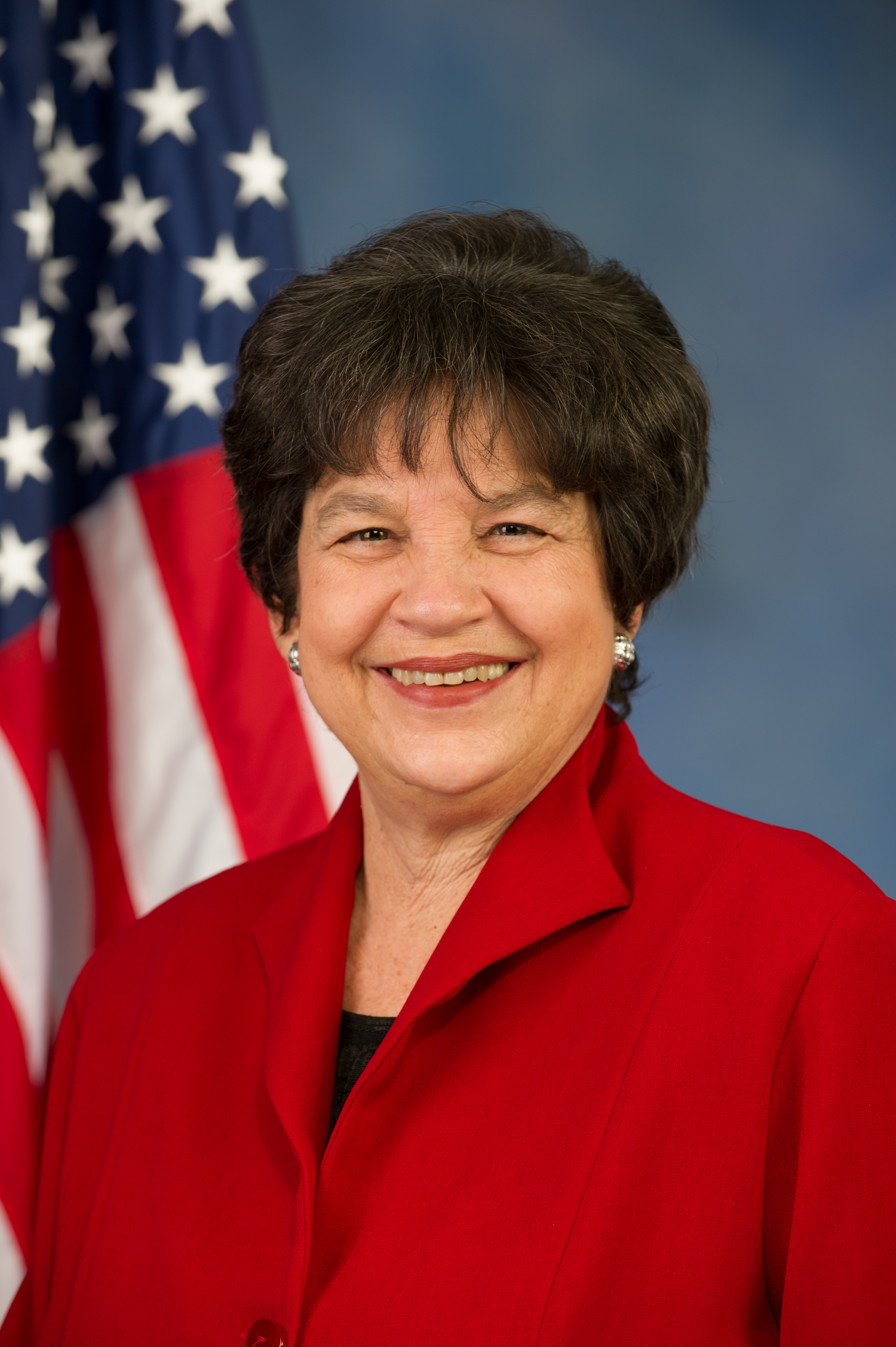
Frankel in 2012

=== Elections ===
==== 2012 ====
On March 21, 2011, Frankel announced that she would run in the newly redrawn Florida's 22nd congressional district in the 2012 House election. She was initially due to face freshman incumbent Republican Allen West, but redistricting had made the 22nd much more Democratic than its predecessor, prompting West to move to the neighboring 18th district and seek reelection there. On August 14 Frankel won the Democratic primary over Kristin Jacobs, and advanced to the general election against Republican Adam Hasner.

Frankel was criticized for accepting $20,000 from Digital Domain Media Group for her campaign five months after the company was awarded a downtown project that included incentives from the city of West Palm Beach, and in response vowed to give the contribution to charity. She won the general election on November 6, 2012, defeating Hasner 54.7% to 45.3%.

==== 2014 ====
With no Democratic primary opponents, Frankel won the general election on November 4, 2014, defeating Republican Paul Spain, winner of his low-turnout primary, 58% to 42%.

==== 2016 ====
For her first two terms, Frankel represented a district covering several coastal areas in southern Palm Beach County and northern Broward County, from West Palm Beach to Fort Lauderdale.

After a Florida Supreme Court-ordered redistricting, Frankel's district was renumbered the 21st. It lost its share of Broward County, becoming a more compact district in southern Palm Beach County. The justices suggested that it was more logical to have just one district splitting Broward and Palm Beach counties. Her opponent was again Republican Paul Spain. The new 21st was no less Democratic than the old 22nd, and Frankel won with 63% of the vote to Spain's 35%.

==== 2018 ====
With no primary or general opponents, Frankel was reelected.

==== 2020 ====
With 86% of the vote, Frankel won the Democratic primary against Guido Weiss, a former adviser to Representative Tulsi Gabbard. Frankel went on to win the November general election, defeating Republican nominee Laura Loomer, a far-right activist and conspiracy theorist. Loomer's candidacy was widely considered a long shot, despite endorsements from high-profile Republicans including President Donald Trump, Representative Matt Gaetz, and former Trump adviser Roger Stone.

==== 2022 ====
Lois Frankel ran unopposed in the Democratic primary and defeated Republican Dan Franzese in the general election, winning 55% to Franzese's 44%.

==== 2024 ====
Incumbent Lois Frankel ran unopposed in the Democratic primary. She faced a rematch with Republican challenger Dan Franzese in the general election. Frankel defeated Franzese again, this time by 10 points.

==== 2026 ====
In May 2026, Florida adopted a new congressional map, and Frankel announced that she would seek reelection in the newly configured 23rd congressional district, which included much of the same constituency she represented in the 22nd district. She redesignated her candidacy that month with the Federal Election Commission, shifting her campaign from the 22nd to the 23rd district.

=== Committee assignments ===
For the 119th Congress:

- Committee on Appropriations
  - Subcommittee on Labor, Health and Human Services, Education, and Related Agencies
  - Subcommittee on State, Foreign Operations, and Related Programs (Ranking Member)

=== Caucus memberships ===
==== Current ====
- Black Maternal Health Caucus
- Congressional Arts Caucus
- Congressional Taiwan Caucus
- United States Congressional International Conservation Caucus
- U.S.-Japan Caucus
- Medicare for All Caucus
- Congressional Caucus for the Equal Rights Amendment
- Congressional Equality Caucus

==== Former ====
- Congressional Progressive Caucus (c. 2016–2023)

== Political positions ==
=== Foreign policy ===
==== Israel ====
In 2017 Frankel supported President Donald Trump's decision to recognize Jerusalem as Israel's capital, saying, "The President's announcement today is consistent with current U.S. law and reaffirms what we already know: Jerusalem is the eternal capital of the Jewish people and the State of Israel."

==== Foreign assistance and diplomacy ====
In January 2025, after the second Trump administration halted most United States foreign assistance, Frankel and Representative Gregory Meeks warned that interruptions to medicines supplied through the President's Emergency Plan for AIDS Relief and the President's Malaria Initiative could cost lives.

Frankel defended keeping the funding for PEPFAR during the 2025 rescissions package. In July 2025, Frankel and Representative Rosa DeLauro said that an isolated incident involving the program should not undermine its broader mission. A proposed $400 million reduction to PEPFAR was subsequently removed from the package. In May 2026, Frankel led Democratic members of the appropriations subcommittee in objecting to administration plans to withhold $19 billion in foreign assistance, including $3.2 billion in development-assistance and global-health funding.

Frankel was also the lead House sponsor of the Global Health, Empowerment, and Rights Act, known as the Global HER Act, which would permanently repeal the Mexico City policy. That policy restricted U.S. funding for foreign nongovernmental organizations that provide, promote, or share information about abortion services.

=== Domestic ===
==== Reproductive rights ====
Frankel supports abortion rights and has made reproductive health policy a focus of her work in Congress. In 2023, as a leader of the House Democratic Women's Caucus, she opposed provisions in the fiscal 2024 National Defense Authorization Act that would have restricted access to reproductive health care for military personnel. Frankel and other caucus leaders said they would oppose final passage of the legislation if the restrictions remained. The provision that would have blocked the Pentagon's policy of reimbursing travel expenses for service members seeking abortions or other reproductive care in another state was subsequently omitted from the final compromise bill.

Frankel also opposed Florida's six-week abortion ban, which took effect in May 2024. She supported the proposed state constitutional amendment that year that would have protected abortion access before fetal viability.

==== Gun policy ====
Frankel supports gun control measures, which she calls "common-sense legislation." Specifically, she supports a high-capacity magazine ban, universal background checks, and a ban on bump stocks. Frankel supports repealing the 1996 Dickey Amendment, which discourages the CDC from researching gun violence prevention. Following the Pulse nightclub shooting, Frankel said, "This Congress offers lots of thoughts and sympathies when people are massacred by firearms, but no action to stop the carnage." After the Sutherland Springs church shooting, Frankel expressed her frustration with gun lobbying organizations and the inaction of Congress, saying: "We'll pause for a moment of silence and then this Congress will do nothing because the NRA has a stranglehold on it." She has an "F" rating from the NRA, indicating that the organization does not believe that she protects gun rights.

During her tenure in the House, Frankel has voted on several pieces of gun legislation. She voted against H. R. 38 (the Concealed Carry Reciprocity Act), which would enable concealed carry reciprocity among all states. In March 2017 Frankel voted against the Veterans Second Amendment Protection Act, which would allow veterans who are considered "mentally incompetent" to purchase ammunition and firearms unless declared a danger by a judge.

==== LGBTQ+ rights ====
In December 2022, Frankel voted for the Respect for Marriage Act, joining the House majority that approved the legislation after it was amended by the Senate. The measure requires federal recognition of valid same-sex and interracial marriages and requires states to recognize such marriages performed legally in other states. President Joe Biden signed the legislation into law on December 13, 2022.

==== Impeachment of President Donald Trump ====
Frankel voted to impeach Trump on December 18, 2019 and again on January 13, 2021.

== Electoral history ==
1986 Florida House of Representatives 83rd district election
Party	Candidate	Votes	%
Democratic	Lois Frankel	16,960	69.31
Republican	Gerald Adams	7,511	30.69
Total votes		24,471	100
Democratic hold			

1988 Florida House of Representatives 83rd district election
Party	Candidate	Votes	%
Democratic	Lois Frankel (incumbent)	unopposed	100
Total votes		N/A	100
Democratic hold			

1990 Florida House of Representatives 83rd district election
Party	Candidate	Votes	%
Democratic	Lois Frankel (incumbent)	unopposed	100
Total votes		N/A	100
Democratic hold			

1992 Florida U.S. House of Representatives 23rd district election
Primary election
Party	Candidate	Votes	%
Democratic	Lois Frankel	12,556	34.63
Democratic	Alcee Hastings	10,237	28.23
Democratic	Bill Clark	9,881	27.25
Democratic	Kenneth Cooper	1,872	5.16
Democratic	William Washington	1,711	4.72
Total votes		36,257	100
Democratic	Alcee Hastings	22,046	57.50
Democratic	Lois Frankel	16,294	42.50
Total votes		38,340	100

1994 Florida House of Representatives 85th district election
Primary election
Party	Candidate	Votes	%
Democratic	Lois Frankel	5,068	64.10
Democratic	Mimi McAndrews (incumbent)	2,839	35.90
Total votes		7,907	100
General election
Democratic	Lois Frankel	18,835	54.91
Republican	George Ford	15,465	45.09
Total votes		34,300	100
Democratic hold			

1996 Florida House of Representatives 85th district election
Party	Candidate	Votes	%
Democratic	Lois Frankel (incumbent)	28,038	67.75
Republican	Donald Radd	13,344	32.25
Total votes		41,382	100
Democratic hold			

1998 Florida House of Representatives 85th district election
Party	Candidate	Votes	%
Democratic	Lois Frankel (incumbent)	21,701	64.05
Republican	Rick Heers	10,455	30.86
Independent	Donald Radd	1,726	5.09
Total votes		33,882	100
Democratic hold			

2000 Florida House of Representatives 85th district election
Party	Candidate	Votes	%
Democratic	Lois Frankel (incumbent)	29,437	62.94
Republican	Cheryl Carpenter	17,331	37.06
Total votes		46,768	100
Democratic hold			

2003 West Palm Beach mayoral election
Candidate	Votes	%
Lois Frankel	6,867	55.75
Joel Daves (incumbent)	4,656	37.80
Gail Vastola	777	6.31
Paul McCullough	13	0.11
Eric Huey	3	0.02
Isabell Masters	1	0.01
Total votes	12,317	100

2007 West Palm Beach mayoral election
Candidate	Votes	%
Lois Frankel (incumbent)	6,578	58.09
Al Zucaro	4,745	41.91
Total votes	11,323	100

2012 Florida U.S. House of Representatives 22nd district election
Primary election
Party	Candidate	Votes	%
Democratic	Lois Frankel	18,483	61.35
Democratic	Kristin Jacobs	11,644	38.65
Total votes		30,127	100
General election
Democratic	Lois Frankel	171,021	54.63
Republican	Adam Hasner	142,050	45.37
Total votes		313,071	100
Democratic gain from Republican			

2014 Florida U.S. House of Representatives 22nd district election
Party	Candidate	Votes	%
Democratic	Lois Frankel (incumbent)	125,404	58.03
Republican	Paul Spain	90,685	41.97
Write-in		7	0.00
Total votes		216,096	100
Democratic hold			

2016 Florida U.S. House of Representatives 21st district election
Party	Candidate	Votes	%
Democratic	Lois Frankel (incumbent)	210,606	62.71
Republican	Paul Spain	118,038	35.14
Independent	W. Michael "Mike" Trout	7,217	2.15
Total votes		335,861	100
Democratic hold			

2018 Florida U.S. House of Representatives 21st district election
Party	Candidate	Votes	%
Democratic	Lois Frankel (incumbent)	unopposed	100
Total votes		N/A	100
Democratic hold			

2020 Florida U.S. House of Representatives 21st district election
Primary election
Party	Candidate	Votes	%
Democratic	Lois Frankel (incumbent)	75,504	85.98
Democratic	Guido Weiss	12,308	14.02
Total votes		87,812	100
General election
Democratic	Lois Frankel (incumbent)	237,925	59.02
Republican	Laura Loomer	157,612	39.10
Independent	Charleston Malkemus	7,544	1.87
Write-in		12	0.00
Total votes		403,093	100
Democratic hold			

2022 Florida U.S. House of Representatives 22nd district election
Party	Candidate	Votes	%
Democratic	Lois Frankel (incumbent)	150,010	55.11
Republican	Dan Franzese	122,194	44.89
Total votes		272,204	100
Democratic hold			

2024 Florida U.S. House of Representatives 22nd district election
Party	Candidate	Votes	%
Democratic	Lois Frankel (incumbent)	201,608	54.96
Republican	Dan Franzese	165,248	45.04
Total votes		366,856	100
Democratic hold			

2026 Florida U.S. House of Representatives 23rd district election
Primary election
Party	Candidate	Votes	%
Democratic	Lois Frankel (incumbent)	42,964	74.72
Democratic	Victoria Doyle	13,438	23.37
Democratic	Mark Piper	1,096	1.91
Total votes		57,498	100

== See also ==
- List of Jewish members of the United States Congress
- Women in the United States House of Representatives

U.S. House of Representatives
Preceded by Allen West	Member of the U.S. House of Representatives from Florida's 22nd congressional district 2013–2017	Succeeded by Ted Deutch
Preceded by Ted Deutch	Member of the U.S. House of Representatives from Florida's 21st congressional district 2017–2023	Succeeded by Brian Mast
Preceded by Ted Deutch	Member of the U.S. House of Representatives from Florida's 22nd congressional district 2023–present	Incumbent
Party political offices
Preceded by Doris Matsui	Chair of the Democratic Women's Working Group; 2017–2019	Succeeded by Herself; Brenda Lawrence; Jackie Speier as Chair of the Democratic Women's Caucus
Preceded by Herself as Chair of the Democratic Women's Working Group	Chair of the Democratic Women's Caucus; 2019–2025; Served alongside: Brenda Lawrence (2019–2023), Jackie Speier (2019–2023)	Succeeded by Teresa Leger Fernández
U.S. order of precedence (ceremonial)
Preceded by Joaquin Castro	United States representatives by seniority 103rd	Succeeded by Richard Hudson
