= 2000 United States Senate election in Florida =

- November 7, 2000
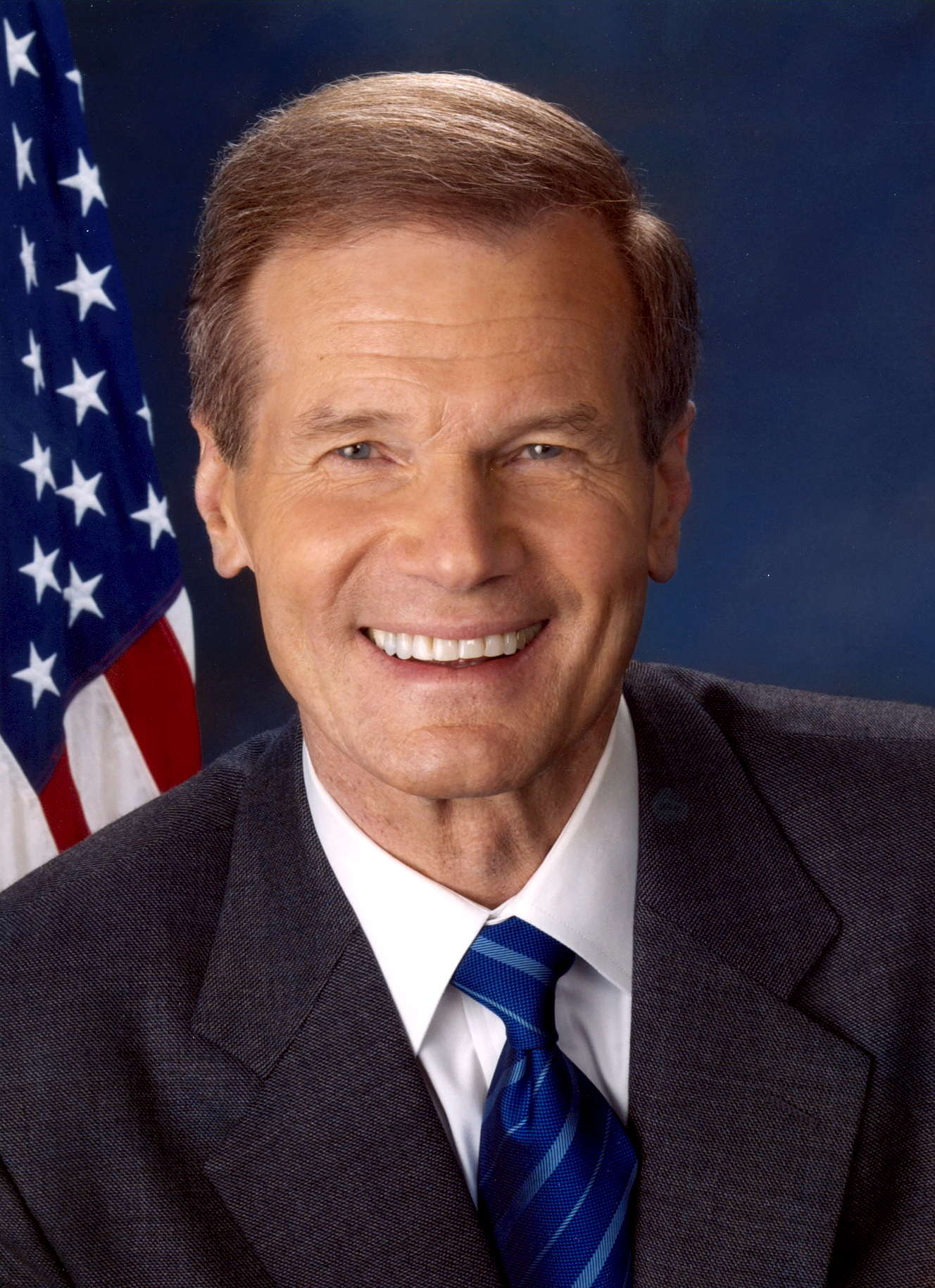

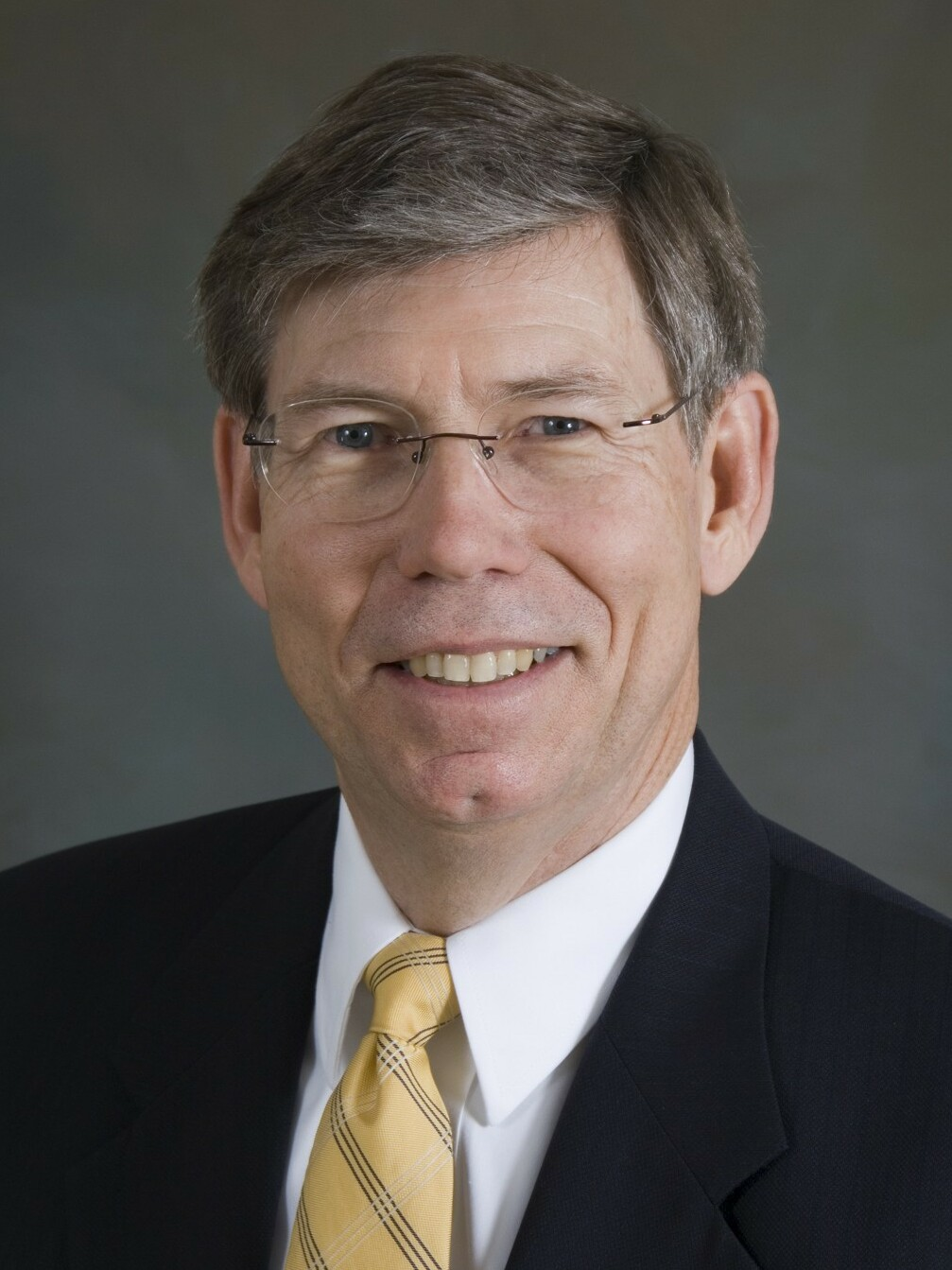
Nominee	Bill Nelson	Bill McCollum
Party	Democratic	Republican
Popular vote	2,989,487	2,705,348
Percentage	51.04%	46.19%
- Nelson: 40–50% 50–60% 60–70% 70–80% 80–90% >90% McCollum: 40–50% 50–60% 60–70% 70–80% 80–90% >90% Tie: 40–50% 50% No votes
U.S. senator before election
Connie Mack III
Republican
Elected U.S. Senator
Bill Nelson
Democratic

The 2000 United States Senate election in Florida was held on November 7, 2000, the same date as the U.S. House of Representatives and presidential election. Incumbent Republican Senator Connie Mack III decided to retire instead of seeking a third term. Democrat Bill Nelson won the open seat, even as Republican presidential nominee George W. Bush narrowly triumphed over Al Gore in the state by a mere 537 votes.

Bill McCollum's 46.19% popular vote percentage is the highest for a losing Republican United States Senate candidate in Florida.

== Republican primary ==
=== Candidates ===
- Hamilton A. S. Bartlett
- Bill McCollum, U.S. representative from Longwood

=== Results ===
Republican primary results
Party	Candidate	Votes	%
Republican	Bill McCollum	660,592	81.13%
Republican	Hamilton A. S. Bartlett	153,613	18.87%
Total votes		814,205	100.00%

== Democratic primary ==
=== Candidates ===
- Newall Jerome Daughtrey, 1998 nominee for comptroller
- David B. Higginbottom, candidate for U.S. House in 1986 and 1988
- Bill Nelson, Florida treasurer, former U.S. representative, and 1990 candidate for governor

=== Results ===
Democratic primary results
Party	Candidate	Votes	%
Democratic	Bill Nelson	692,147	77.48%
Democratic	Newall Jerome Daughtrey	105,650	11.83%
Democratic	David B. Higginbottom	95,492	10.69%
Total votes		893,289	100.00%

== General election ==
=== Candidates ===
- Joel Deckard, former U.S. representative from Evansville, Indiana (Reform)
- Willie Logan, state representative from Opa-Locka (Independent)
- Andy Martin, perennial candidate (Independent)
- Bill McCollum, U.S. representative from Longwood (Republican)
- Darrell McCormick (Independent)
- Bill Nelson, Florida treasurer, former U.S. representative (Democratic)
- Joe Simonetta (Natural Law)

=== Campaign ===
This election was concurrent with the presidential election, where Bush narrowly defeated Gore after an intense recount. The Senate election was evenly matched, with two U.S. congressmen named Bill in their mid-50s. Both parties heavily targeted this senate seat.

The election became very nasty, as Nelson called his opponent "an extremist who would sacrifice the elderly, the poor, and the working class to coddle the rich." McCollum called the Democrat "a liberal who would tax everything that moves, and some things that don't." The election advertisements were very negative, as both candidates talked more about each other than themselves.

Nelson raised only soft money, but had help from Gore and President Bill Clinton. Two days before the election, McCollum predicted he would win by a 6-point margin. On election day, he lost by a five-point margin.

=== Debates ===
- Complete video of debate, October 12, 2000

=== Polling ===
Poll source	Date(s)	Sample size	Margin of error	Bill McCollum (R)	Bill Nelson (D)	Other / undecided (Note: Calculated by taking the difference of 100% and all other candidates combined.)
SurveyUSA	November 5, 2000	500	—	42%	49%	9%
Zogby Analytics	November 5, 2000	593	—	47%	49%	4%
Harris Insights & Analytics	November 3, 2000	16,996	—	46%	50%	4%
Zogby Analytics	November 2, 2000	600	—	39%	44%	17%
Rasmussen Reports	November 1, 2000	577	—	45%	42%	13%
SurveyUSA	November 1, 2000	500	—	43%	45%	12%
Mason-Dixon Polling & Strategy	October 31, 2000	812	—	40%	45%	15%
Zogby Analytics	October 30, 2000	600	—	37%	42%	21%
The Florida Poll	October 29, 2000	824	—	39%	46%	15%
Zogby Analytics	October 27, 2000	600	—	36%	46%	18%
Rasmussen Reports	October 25, 2000	864	—	43%	47%	10%
CBS News/The New York Times	October 23, 2000	514	—	36%	45%	19%
Fleming & Associates	October 20, 2000	606	—	40%	43%	17%
McLaughlin & Associates (R) (Note: Poll conducted for Bill McCollum.)	October 17, 2000	600	—	38%	38%	24%

=== Results ===
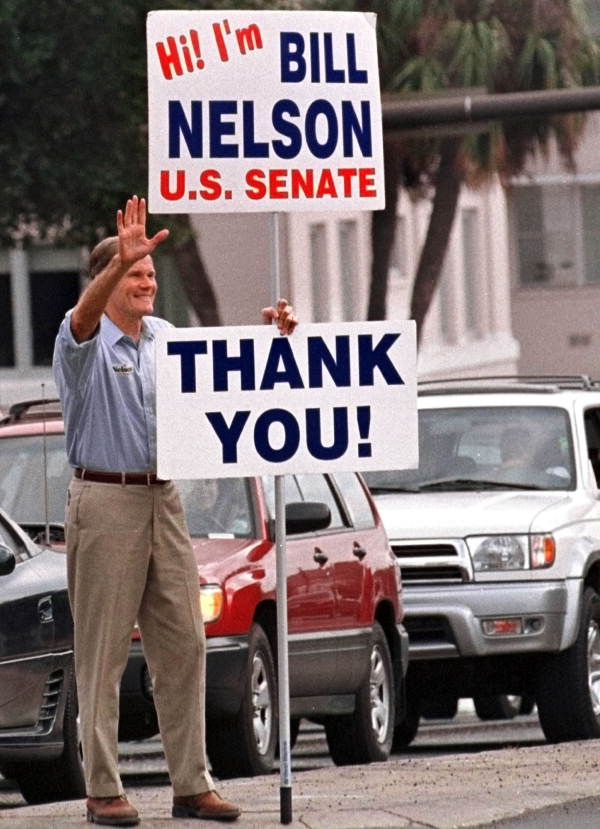
Bill Nelson with a "thank you" sign after his victory

General election results
Party	Candidate	Votes	%
Democratic	Bill Nelson	2,989,487	51.04%
Republican	Bill McCollum	2,705,348	46.19%
Independent	Willie Logan	80,830	1.38%
Natural Law	Joe Simonetta	26,087	0.45%
Independent	Darrell L. McCormick	21,664	0.37%
Reform	Joel Deckard	17,338	0.30%
Independent	Andy Martin	15,889	0.27%
Write-in	Nikki Oldaker	88	0.00%
Total votes		5,856,731	100.00%
Democratic gain from Republican			

==== Counties that flipped from Republican to Democratic ====
- Calhoun (largest city: Blountstown)
- Citrus (largest city: Homosassa Springs)
- Dixie (largest city: Cross City)
- Glades (largest city: Moore Haven)
- Gulf (largest city: Port St. Joe)
- Levy (largest city: Williston)
- Putnam (largest city: Palatka)
- Taylor (largest city: Perry)
- Wakulla (largest city: Sopchoppy)
- Jackson (largest city: Marianna)
- Lafayette (largest city: Mayo)
- Union (largest city: Lake Butler)
- Washington (largest city: Chipley)
- Brevard (largest municipality: Palm Bay)
- Flagler (largest municipality: Palm Coast)
- Franklin (largest municipality: Eastpoint)
- Hamilton (largest municipality: Jasper)
- Hernando (largest municipality: Spring Hill)
- Jefferson (largest municipality: Monticello)
- Liberty (largest municipality: Bristol)
- Madison (largest municipality: Madison)
- Okeechobee (largest municipality: Okeechobee)
- Pasco (largest municipality: Wesley Chapel)
- Polk (largest municipality: Lakeland)
- Volusia (largest municipality: Deltona)
- Hillsborough (largest municipality: Tampa)
- Miami-Dade (largest city: Miami)
- Osceola (largest municipality: Kissimmee)
- Palm Beach (largest city: West Palm Beach)
- Pinellas (largest municipality: St. Petersburg)
- St. Lucie (largest city: Port St. Lucie)
- Orange (largest city: Orlando)
- Monroe (largest city: Key West)
- Alachua (largest city: Gainesville)
- Broward (largest city: Fort Lauderdale)
- Gadsden (largest city: Quincy)
- Leon (largest city: Tallahassee)

== See also ==
- 2000 United States Senate elections
