= Solicitor General of Florida =

- Incumbent; Jeffrey Paul DeSousa (Acting) since January 18, 2025
- Type: Solicitor General
- Appointer: Attorney General of Florida
- Formation: July 1999
- First holder: Tom Warner

The solicitor general of Florida or Florida solicitor general is the top appellate (appeals) solicitor (lawyer) for the U.S. State of Florida. It is an appointed position in the Office of the Florida Attorney General and the individual serves at the pleasure of the attorney general. Many of the cases handled by the Solicitor are argued in the United States Supreme Court and the Supreme Court of Florida. However some cases within the solicitor's responsibilities are under the jurisdiction of the United States Court of Appeals for the 11th Circuit and the state appellate courts. The solicitor represents the Florida attorney general before the Florida Supreme Court and other appellate courts, as needed. He also decides whether the State of Florida has an interest in all cases filed in the Florida Supreme Court and if the state should file or join an amicus brief.

== History ==
The position was created in July 1999 at the request of Florida attorney general Bob Butterworth and was first filled by Tom Warner. It is a similar position to solicitors in many states and is modeled after the United States solicitor general. By 2003, twenty-nine states had solicitors general, although only eight had them fifteen years earlier. The solicitor does not always argue constitutional law. Most states' attorneys general offices have had separate divisions with chiefs specializing in state and federal appellate works. Organizing the department with a separate solicitor general is a model that states are using in attempt to promote the professionalism and quality of the work. This strategy generally gives the attorney general more of specialist who may be somewhat of a legal scholar on staff. Also, the solicitor is typically someone who was not involved in the attorney general's campaign and is thus someone who is more likely to offer a different perspective than other lawyers who are entrenched in the department. The position is currently held by Jeffrey Paul DeSousa, in an acting capacity.

== Teaching ==
The Florida solicitor general holds the Richard W. Ervin Eminent Scholar Chair, named to honor former attorney general and Florida Supreme Court chief justice Richard Ervin. The individual holding the chair teaches advanced courses at the Florida State University College of Law. As such, Florida State University pays half of the solicitor's salary, $165,000 as of 2010.

An externship program was established to allow a small number of law students the opportunity to work directly with the solicitor on active cases and receive up to six hours of course credit while gaining practical experience in appellate procedures and constitutional law.

== List of solicitors ==
The following is a table of Florida state solicitors.

No.	Years	Florida Solicitor General	Florida Attorney General
1	1999–2002	Tom Warner	Bob Butterworth
2	2003–2006	Chris Kise	Charlie Crist
3	2007–2010	Scott Makar	Bill McCollum
4 (–)	2011–2012	Scott Makar	Pam Bondi
5	2012–2013	Timothy Osterhaus	Pam Bondi
6	2013–2016	Allen C. Winsor	Pam Bondi
7	2016–2018	Amit Agarwal	Pam Bondi
8 (–)	2018–2021	Amit Agarwal	Ashley Moody
9	2021–2025	Henry C. Whitaker	Ashley Moody
10	2025-2026	Jeffrey P. DeSousa (Acting)	James Uthmier
