= Jacox =

Jacox is a family name of English origin.

Jacox is an Old English name derived from the baptismal name for the "Son of John" (John the Apostle). It was originally derived from the Hebrew given name Yohanan, meaning "Jehovah has favored me with a son." Jack was used as a nickname for John and the suffix -cock was added at the end to signify youthfulness. Jack-cock was soon abbreviated to Jacock and over time underwent many spelling variations including Jeacock, Jeacocks, Jecock, Jacocke, Jacock, Jacocks, Jaycocke, Jaycocks, Jeacox, Jacox, Jaycox, Jacok, Jecok, Jecockes and Jecockes.

The first recorded spelling of the family name is shown to be that of William Jacok, which was dated 1327, in the "Subsidy Rolls of Suffolk", during the reign of King Edward 111, known as "The Father of the Navy" 1327 - 1377. Later on in the early half of the 14th century John Jecok appears in the 1375 Court Rolls of the Borough of Colchester, and a John Jecokes in the 1381 Assize Court Rolls of Warwickshire. In 1712 the marriage of James Sharples and Elizabeth Jeacock was recorded in St. James Church, Clerkenwell, London.

During the 17th century instances of the Jacox surname popped up in America. By 1790 approximately 20 families with the Jacox surname were living in the United States, with the majority of these families residing in New York As time went on the number of families with this surname grew and the distribution of the Jacox surname spread across the United States. By 1940 over 1500 individuals were listed on the U.S. Federal census with the surname Jacox and its variant spellings.

Notable people with the surname include:

- Kendyl Jacox (born 1975), American college football and National Football League player
- Marilyn E. Jacox (c. 1929–2013), American physicist known for her work in matrix isolation spectroscopy
- Martin Jacox (1938–1998), American singer, member of the gospel group The Soul Stirrers
- Willis Jacox (born 1966), American retired football player who played in the Canadian and Arena Football Leagues

== See also ==
- Jacot
