= Henry C. Whitaker =

American academic and lawyer

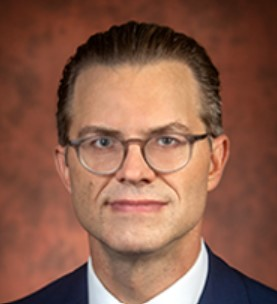

United States Assistant Attorney General for the Office of Legal Counsel
- Acting
- In office January 20, 2025 – August 4, 2025
- Preceded by: Christopher Fonzone
- Succeeded by: T. Elliot Gaiser

9th Solicitor General of Florida
- In office July 1, 2021 – January 17, 2025
- Attorney General: Ashley Moody
- Preceded by: Amit Agarwal

Personal details
- Born: April 29, 1978 (age 48) Falls Church, Virginia, U.S.
- Party: Republican
- Education: Yale University (BA); Harvard University (JD)
- Occupation: Attorney; teacher

Henry Charles Whitaker (born April 29, 1978) is an American legal scholar who served as the Solicitor General of Florida from 2021 to 2025. Previously he was the Principal Deputy Assistant Attorney General for the Office of Legal Counsel at the U.S. Department of Justice in the District of Columbia. Donald Trump appointed him in January 2025 as acting head of the Office of Legal Counsel.

== Early life and education ==
Henry Charles Whitaker was born in Falls Church, Virginia.

In 2000 he graduated from Yale University with a Bachelor of Arts, magna cum laude. He then attended Harvard Law School, where he received a Juris Doctor, magna cum laude, in 2003.

== Career ==
Whitaker clerked for Judge David B. Sentelle of the United States Court of Appeals for the District of Columbia Circuit and Justice Clarence Thomas of the Supreme Court of the United States.

He was the Principal Deputy Assistant Attorney General for the Office of Legal Counsel at the U.S. Department of Justice. In that position, he advised the White House Counsel and cabinet secretaries regarding constitutional and statutory questions. Following his clerkships, he served on the Appellate Staff of the Civil Division of the DOJ where he argued more than 40 federal court appeals.

He is a contributor to and member of the Federalist Society.

=== Solicitor General, 2021–2024 ===
Whitaker was appointed as Florida Solicitor General by Florida Attorney General Ashley Moody in July 2021. He was admitted to the Florida Bar (ID #1031175) on September 22, 2021. As Florida Solicitor General, Whitaker oversaw civil appeals involving the state's interests in all state and federal appellate courts. He also serves as the Richard Ervin Visiting Professor in the Florida State University College of Law where he teaches. His $165,000 salary was split between the state and FSU.

While Solicitor General, Whitaker argued cases before the Eleventh Circuit Court of Appeals, the Florida Supreme Court, the First District Court of Appeal, several Judicial Circuits, and the United States Supreme Court.

=== OLC, 2025 ===
Donald Trump appointed him in January 2025 as acting head of the Office of Legal Counsel. As of February his name was no longer on the OLC website. He is currently serving as a Counselor to the U.S. Attorney General.

=== United States v. James and United States v. Comey ===
In November 2025, Whitaker entered his appearance as counsel on behalf of the prosecution in the cases of United States of America v. Letitia James and United States v. James B. Comey, Jr.
