= Skip Campbell =

American politician (1948–2018)

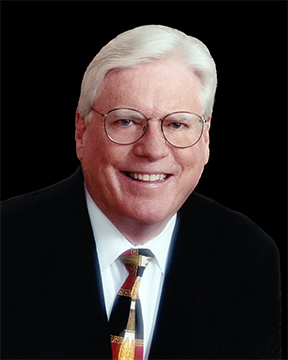

Mayor of Coral Springs
- In office November 14, 2014 – October 23, 2018
- Preceded by: Vincent Boccard
- Succeeded by: Lou Cimaglia (Acting)

Member of the Florida Senate from the 32nd district
- In office November 19, 2002 – November 21, 2006
- Preceded by: Debbie Wasserman Schultz
- Succeeded by: Jeremy Ring

Member of the Florida Senate from the 33rd district
- In office November 19, 1996 – November 19, 2002
- Preceded by: Peter Weinstein
- Succeeded by: Frederica Wilson

Personal details
- Born: November 12, 1948 Rockaway Beach, New York, U.S.
- Died: October 23, 2018 (aged 69) Coral Springs, Florida, U.S.
- Party: Democratic
- Spouse: Lynn Satin
- Education: University of Florida (B.A.); Fredric G. Levin College of Law (J.D.)
- Profession: Attorney

Walter G. "Skip" Campbell Jr. (November 12, 1948 – October 23, 2018) was an American Democratic politician who served as a member of the Florida Senate from 1996 to 2006. Later, he served as the mayor of Coral Springs, Florida, from 2014 until his death.

== History ==
Campbell was born in Rockaway Beach, New York, in 1948 and moved to Florida in 1961. He attended the St. John Vianney College Seminary, receiving his associate degree, and then the University of Florida, receiving his bachelor's degree in 1970 and his Juris Doctor in 1973. Campbell founded the law firm Krupnick & Campbell, now known as Krupnick Campbell Malone Buser Slama Hancock Liberman, with Jon Krupnick in 1975. He worked as an adjunct professor at the Shepard Broad Law Center and served as President of the Broward County Bar Association and as a member of the Florida Election Commission. As a private practice attorney, he sued DuPont over fungicide-caused crop damage, took up medical malpractice cases, and filed a lawsuit "that helped trigger design changes in cars to prevent doors from flying open in accidents."

== Florida Senate ==
In 1996, incumbent State Senator Peter Weinstein declined to seek re-election to instead unsuccessfully run for Congress. Campbell ran to succeed him in the 33rd District, which included northwestern Broward County. He faced State Representative Steven Feren in the Democratic primary. Both Campbell and Feren campaigned in support of funding for public education, crime prevention, and property insurance reform. Campbell attacked Feren for living outside of the Senate district, for few legislative accomplishments in the Florida House, and for his close relationship with "special-interest groups." Feren, meanwhile, criticized Campbell for being out of touch due to his personal wealth and for using "distortions and mistruths and outright lies" against him. During the campaign, Campbell was endorsed by the Sun-Sentinel, which praised his "penchant for leadership" and his "potential to emerge as one of the state's leading legislators," though they praised Feren for being "a responsible public servant." Ultimately, Campbell defeated Feren comfortably, winning 59% of the vote to Feren's 41%.

Campbell advanced to the general election, where he faced Republican nominee Frank Virella, a mortgage broker and former legislative aide. He campaigned on his support for addressing school overcrowding, reforming the state's insurance system, and reforming juvenile justice, while Virella focused on his support for limited government. Campbell was endorsed again by the Sun-Sentinel, which suggested that he would be "capable of effectively representing his constituents from the start." Campbell ended up defeating Virella in a landslide, winning 68% of the vote to Virella's 32%.

Campbell was re-elected without opposition in 2000. In 2002, following redistricting, Campbell ran for re-election in the 32nd District, which contained most of the territory that he had previously represented in Broward County, including Coral Springs, Margate, Parkland, Sunrise, and Tamarac. He was re-elected to his third and final term unopposed.

== 2006 Attorney General campaign ==
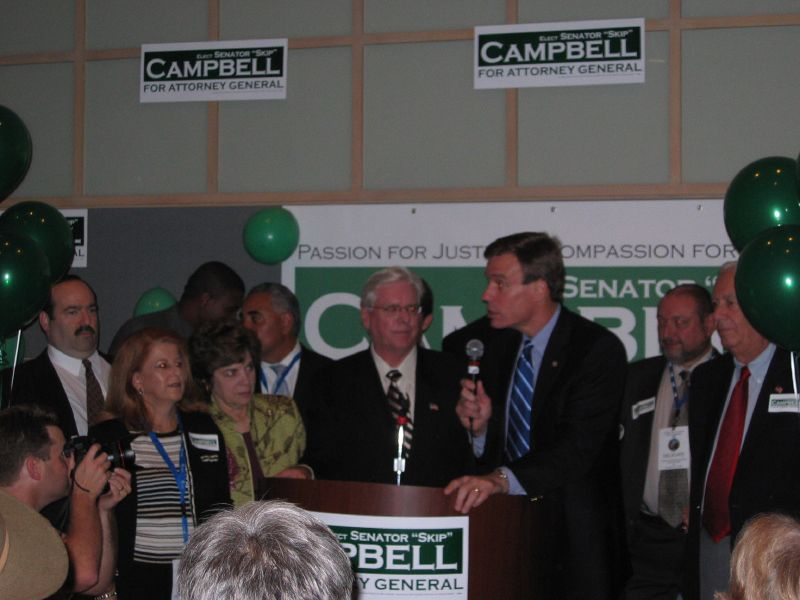
Campbell is joined by Mark Warner at a campaign event.

Campbell, who was unable to seek another term in the Senate in 2006 due to term limits, announced in 2005 that he would run for Attorney General of Florida. He cited his experience as a private practice attorney and pledged to prosecute gas companies for price-gouging in the aftermath of Hurricane Katrina. He was opposed in the Democratic primary by Merrilee Ehrlich, a trial attorney, who announced her campaign on the premise of providing Democratic primary voters "an option and a viable one." Campbell suggested that Ehrlich joined the race "in a misguided, but benevolent, attempt to give him statewide exposure by forcing the primary," though he denied that he was behind the effort. Campbell was endorsed by the Sarasota Herald-Tribune and The Ledger in the Democratic primary; the Herald-Tribune praised his "skills and experience" to handle the job, while the Ledger called him "a worthy contender" for his experience in the legislature. Campbell ended up defeating Ehrlich handily, winning 65% of the vote to her 35%.

In the general election, Campbell faced former United States Congressman Bill McCollum, the Republican nominee. During the election, Campbell campaigned as a moderate Democrat, citing his experience in the Republican-dominated State Senate as an example. Both Campbell and McCollum agreed on the need to toughen laws against sexual predators and to push for additional protections against identity theft. Campbell advocated for a reduction of backlogs in the state's court system by hiring more prosecutors and public defenders and creating rehabilitation and pre-trial diversion programs, while McCollum argued for a limitation on lawsuits. The Terri Schiavo case was a major issue during the campaign, with McCollum attacking Campbell for changing his position on state intervention in the Schiavo case. Campbell said that, as a Catholic and as a moderate Democrat, he was "desperate to find a way" to intervene in the case, but could not find a constitutional way to do so. He, in turn, attacked McCollum for his record in Congress, where he sponsored legislation that would have removed "whistle-blower protections in Medicaid fraud cases," and for working a lobbyist representing large corporations. Campbell was endorsed by the Sarasota Herald-Tribune once again, which argued that he was "more familiar with state issues than McCollum," and that his "philosophy is representative of mainstream Florida." He was also endorsed by the Tallahassee Democrat, which noted that, although the two candidates were alike, Campbell "deserves to be the state's top law-enforcement official because of his proven ability to foster bipartisanship and his record in private life as a top-flight attorney." Ultimately, however, McCollum narrowly edged out Campbell, winning with 53% of the vote to Campbell's 47%.

== State Senate campaign ==
Following his unsuccessful campaign for Attorney General, Campbell announced that he would challenge Republican State Senator Jeff Atwater for re-election in the 25th District, which stretched from Port Everglades to Jupiter in Broward County and Palm Beach County. He argued that he would reform what he called the "pay-to-play culture" in the legislature, and that Atwater was too close with insurance companies to represent his constituents. Though the race was considered to be the "most competitive state Senate seat" in 2008, Campbell ended up dropping out due to a negative reaction to his hip surgery. When Atwater vacated the seat in 2010 to run for Chief Financial Officer of Florida, Campbell considered entering the race, but ultimately declined to do so.

== Mayor of Coral Springs ==
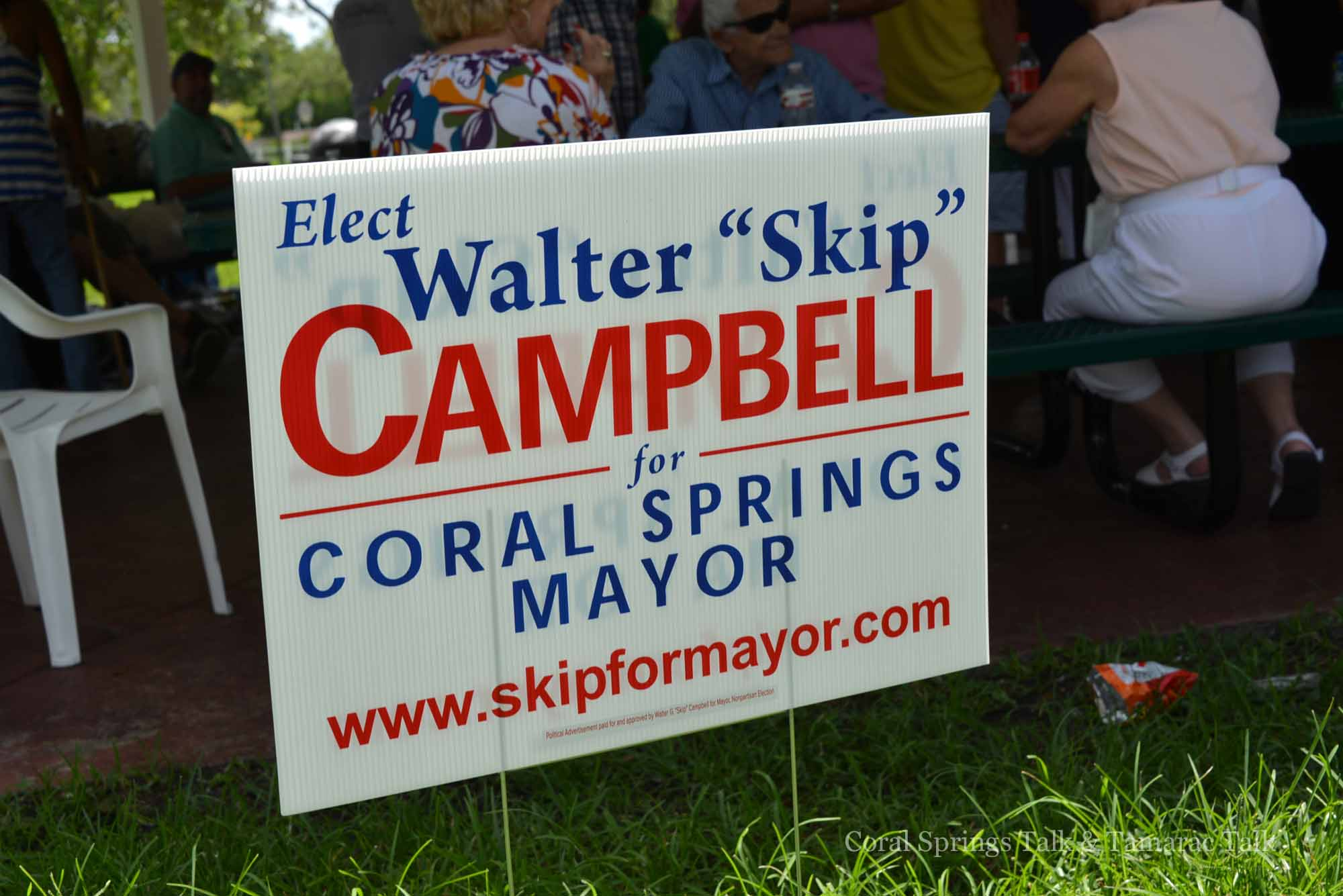
Yard sign from Campbell's 2014 mayoral campaign

Though Campbell publicly announced that he was considering running for the State Senate once again in 2016, he announced in 2014 that he would run for Mayor of Coral Springs that year. Campbell campaigned on his plan to prioritize city spending, criticizing a $70,000 city branding campaign and a plan to build a new City Hall that would cost $28 million. He was opposed by Coral Springs Commissioner Tom Powers, who campaigned on his support for a downtown area. Campbell criticized the idea of a downtown, saying, "The city should instead be focusing on spending its dollars wisely." He defended his experience in Coral Springs municipal politics, noting that he served on the Coral Springs Economic Development Foundation, and said that he would provide incentives to attract businesses and hire additional police officers. Campbell ended up defeating Powers and won re-election in November 2016. At the time of his death he was standing for re-election once again in the 2018 contest and was running unopposed.

== Death ==
Campbell died at age 69 on October 23, 2018; he was recovering from a hip operation.

Florida Senate
Preceded by Peter Weinstein	Member of the Florida Senate from the 33rd district November 19, 1996 – November 19, 2002	Succeeded by Frederica Wilson
Preceded by Debbie Wasserman Schultz	Member of the Florida Senate from the 32nd district November 19, 2002 – November 21, 2006	Succeeded by Jeremy Ring
Party political offices
Preceded by Buddy Dyer	Democratic nominee for Attorney General of Florida; 2006	Succeeded by Dan Gelber
Political offices
Preceded by Vincent Boccard	Mayor of Coral Springs; November 14, 2014 – October 23, 2018	Succeeded by Lou Cimaglia; Acting
