= Richard Kelly (Florida politician) =

American politician (1924–2005)

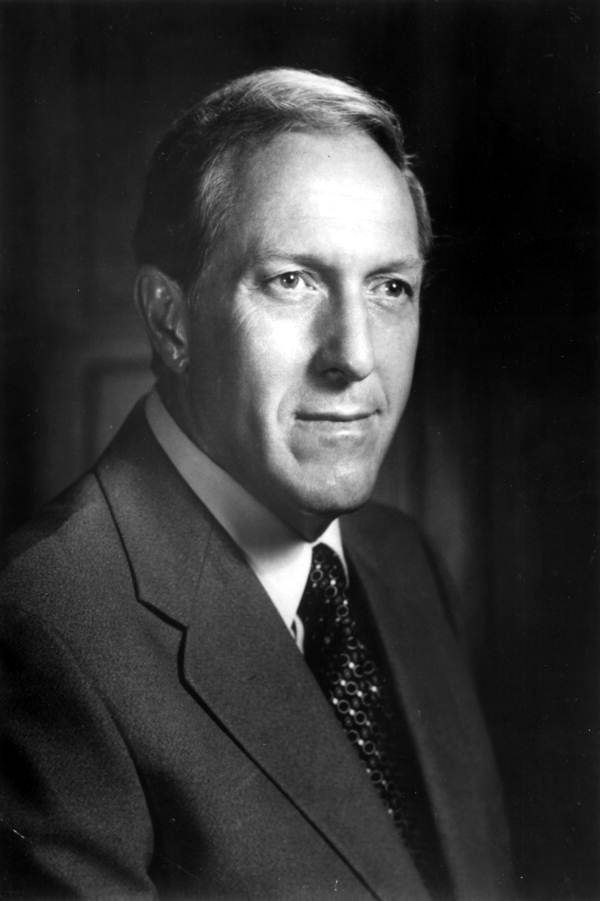

Member of the U.S. House of Representatives from Florida's 5th district
- In office January 3, 1975 – January 3, 1981
- Preceded by: Bill Gunter
- Succeeded by: Bill McCollum

Personal details
- Born: July 31, 1924 Atlanta, Georgia, U.S.
- Died: August 22, 2005 (aged 81) Stevensville, Montana, U.S.
- Party: Republican
- Spouse(s): Unknown; Loraine; Judy; Claire
- Children: 3
- Education: University of Northern Colorado (BA); Vanderbilt University; University of Florida (JD)

Military service
- Allegiance: United States
- Branch/service: United States Marine Corps
- Years of service: 1942–1946

Richard Kelly (July 31, 1924 – August 22, 2005) was an American politician from Florida. As a Republican congressman, he was convicted of taking bribes in the 1980 Abscam scandal.

== Early life and career ==
Kelly was born July 31, 1924, in Atlanta, Georgia, and his mother abandoned him in an orphanage at an early age. He attended a one-room school in Crystal Springs, Florida. He served in the United States Marine Corps from 1942 to 1946, attended Colorado State College of Education and Vanderbilt College of Law, and graduated from the University of Florida College of Law in Florida with a Juris Doctor in 1952.

While in Colorado, he married for the first of five times. He was admitted to the Florida bar the same year and practiced in Zephyrhills. In 1953, he became city attorney of Zephyrhills and worked from 1956 to 1959 as senior assistant to the United States Attorney for the Southern District of Florida. Kelly was appointed circuit judge of the sixth judicial circuit of Florida and served from 1960 to 1974, when he was elected to the United States House of Representatives as a Republican. While serving as a state judge, Kelly twice survived impeachment efforts to remove him. This included the passage of an impeachment in the State House in 1963, with him being acquitted in his impeachment trial of the charges detailed in the articles of impeachment.

Troubled by accusations of insanity in the 1970s, Kelly allowed himself to be examined by doctors, who declared him sane, allowing him to boast that he was "the only Congressman officially certified as not cuckoo."

He served three terms in the House of Representatives, starting in 1975. He opposed Food Stamps, aid to the failing Chrysler Corporation and financially troubled New York City. He attributed New York City fiscal crisis to the pay for police and firefighters and aid to poor people: "The unions have forced industry out of the city. The uniformed services are the highest-paid in the U.S. of A. And welfare? City politicians keep jacking up the rates to get the ghetto vote. No doubt about it."

== Abscam scandal and later life ==
In 1980, Kelly was involved in the FBI undercover Abscam scandal and failed to win renomination, losing to Republican Bill McCollum.

Kelly was the only Republican member of the House to vote against the expulsion of fellow Abscam target Michael Myers (D-PA). Myers was expelled by a 376-30 vote on October 2, 1980, the House's first expulsion since 1861.

Kelly was convicted of taking $25,000 in bribes. He claimed he had conducted his own undercover operation and spent part of the money to maintain that cover, but was convicted and served thirteen months of a 6 to 18 month sentence at the federal prison camp at Eglin Air Force Base. During his third term, he also divorced his wife and married his secretary. He was released from a halfway house in 1986.

Kelly died on August 22, 2005, in Stevensville, Montana after suffering for years with Pick's disease. He was 81 years old.

== See also ==
- List of American federal politicians convicted of crimes
- List of federal political scandals in the United States

U.S. House of Representatives
Preceded by Bill Gunter	Member of the U.S. House of Representatives from Florida's 5th congressional district 1975–1981	Succeeded by Bill McCollum
