= Donald F. Hazelton =

American politician (died 2012)

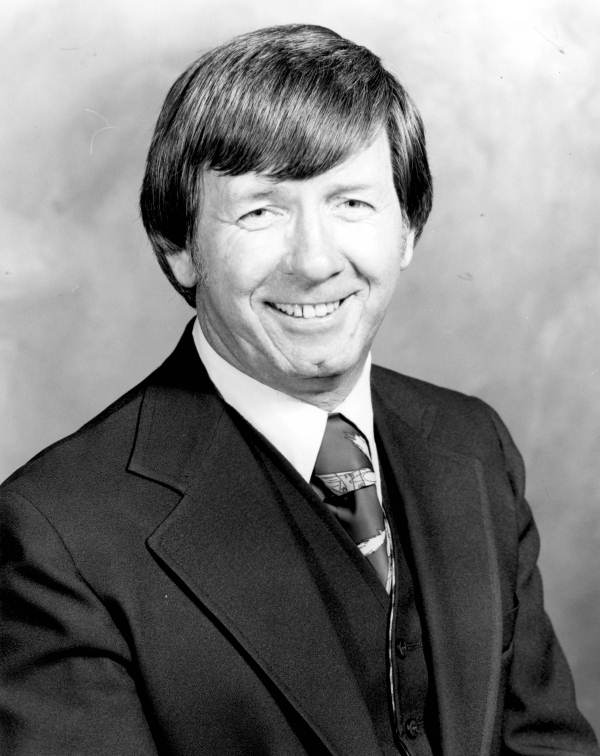
- Hazelton in 1976

Member of the Florida House of Representatives from the 78th district
- In office 1970–1978
- Preceded by: William G. James
- Succeeded by: Ray Liberti

Personal details
- Born: 1928 or 1929 Buffalo, New York, U.S.
- Died: September 14, 2012 (aged 83) Tallahassee, Florida, U.S.
- Party: Democratic; Republican
- Spouse: Geri-Atkinson Hazelton
- Children: 2
- Education: Cornell University; Florida State University

Donald F. Hazelton (1928/1929 – September 14, 2012) was an American politician who served as a Democratic member for the 78th district of the Florida House of Representatives from 1970 to 1978.

Hazelton was born in Buffalo, New York, and attended Cornell University and Florida State University. He worked as a photographer. In 1970, he was elected for the 78th district of the Florida House of Representatives, succeeding William G. James. He was succeeded by Ray Liberti in 1978.

Hazelton died in September 2012 in Tallahassee, Florida, at the age of 83.
