= Florida's 82nd House of Representatives district =

Florida district

Florida's 82nd State House of Representatives district
Representative
Liesa Priddy; R–Naples

Florida's 82nd House of Representatives district elects one member of the Florida House of Representatives. It contains Hendry County and parts of Collier County.

== Members ==
- Doc Kimmel (1980–1982)
- Ray Liberti (1982–1992)
- Tom Warner (1992–1999)
- Art Argenio (1999–2000)
- Joe Negron (2000–2006)
- William Snyder (2006–2012)
- MaryLynn Magar (2012–2020)
- John Snyder (2020–2022)
- Lauren Melo (2022–2026)
- Liesa Priddy (since 2026)
