= William Snyder (politician) =

American politician

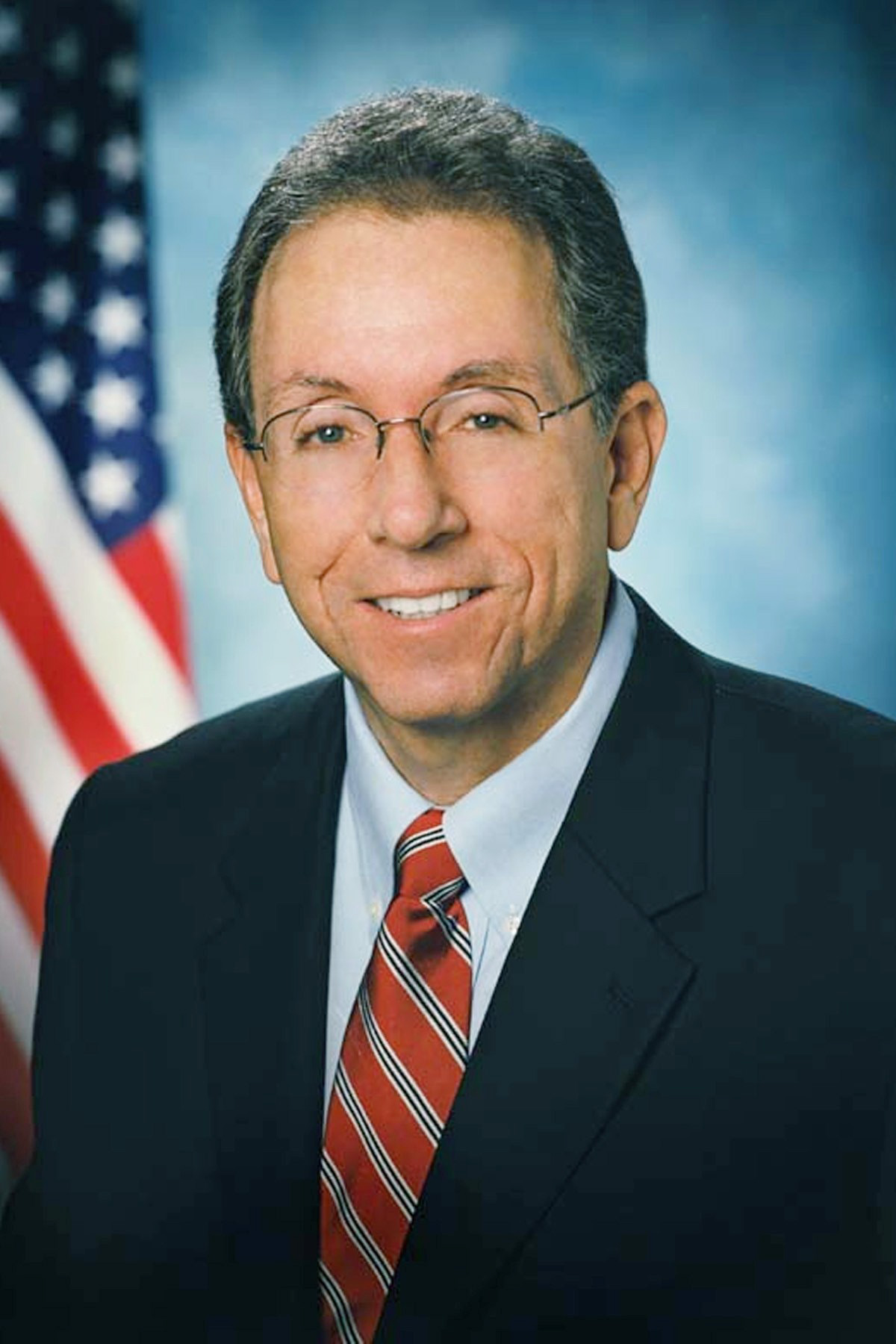

8th Sheriff of Martin County
- In office January 8, 2013 – January 7, 2025
- Preceded by: Robert L. Crowder
- Succeeded by: John Budensiek

Member of the Florida House of Representatives from the 82nd district
- In office November 2006 – November 2012
- Preceded by: Joe Negron
- Succeeded by: MaryLynn Magar

Personal details
- Born: September 6, 1952 (age 73) New York City, U.S.
- Party: Republican
- Profession: law enforcement
- Police career
- Allegiance: Miami-Dade County; Martin County
- Department: Miami-Dade Police Department; Martin County Sheriff's Office
- Service years: 1974–1994 (Miami); 1994–2006 (Martin County)
- Rank: Major

William D. Snyder (born September 6, 1952) is an American politician and former law enforcement officer who served as the sheriff of Martin County, Florida from 2013 to 2025. A member of the Republican Party, he previously served in the House of Representatives from 2006 to 2012.

He is the father of John Snyder.

== Early life and career ==
He earned his Associate of Arts degree in Criminal Justice in 1976 from Miami-Dade Community College. He graduated from the FBI Academy at the University of Virginia in 1999 and Florida Gulf Coast University in 2010.

Snyder worked as a police officer at the Miami-Dade Police Department (formerly Metro-Dade) for 20-years.

In 1994, he joined the Martin County Sheriff's Office as a captain and chief criminal investigator. Snyder was soon promoted to major and became the Director of Law Enforcement for the entire agency.

== Political career ==
In 2006, Snyder was elected to the Florida House of Representatives, and re-elected both in 2008 and 2010. As a representative, he served on the Florida House Appropriations, Criminal & Civil Justice, and Finance & Tax Committees during his tenure. He was elected chairman of both the Judiciary Committee and the Criminal & Civil Justice Committee.

In 2012, Snyder was elected as the 8th sheriff of Martin County, Florida, and subsequently re-elected in 2016 and 2020.

In 2024, Snyder announced he would not seek re-election and would retire upon completing his current term. He was succeeded by his chief deputy and fellow Republican, John Budensiek.
