= Chris Kise =

American lawyer

Solicitor General of Florida
- In office January 7, 2003 – January 2, 2007
- Governor: Jeb Bush
- Preceded by: Tom Warner
- Succeeded by: Scott Makar

Personal details
- Born: Christopher Michael Kise; 1964 or 1965 (age 60–61)
- Party: Republican
- Education: University of Miami (BS); Florida State University (JD)
- Website: Official website

Christopher Michael Kise (born 1964 or 1965) is an American lawyer who served as the second Solicitor General of Florida from 2003 to 2006.

Kise has served on the board of directors of Enterprise Florida, was an advisor to Republican politicians Charlie Crist and Ron DeSantis, and joined Donald Trump's legal team in 2022. Other notable clients include Rick Scott and Andrew Gillum.

== Early life and education ==
Kise was born in 1964 or 1965. He graduated from Florida State University College of Law in 1990 after obtaining a degree in accounting from the University of Miami in 1986. While studying, he also worked as the managing editor and the articles editor of the Florida State University Law Review.

== Career ==
Kise unsuccessfully ran for Senate as a Republican in the 1998 United States Senate elections.

In 2002, friend Charlie Crist chose Kise to be second Solicitor General of Florida, his term starting in 2003 and ending in 2006. Later, Kise worked as a legal advisor to Crist. He has won four US Supreme Court cases. In 2008, he was criticised by Public Service Commissioner Nancy Argenziano for working as the government's special adviser on energy and climate change while also representing companies responsible for pollution. Until 2016, Kise was on the board of directors of Enterprise Florida. In 2019, Kise was a transition advisor for Ron DeSantis. Other clients have included Rick Scott, Charlie Crist, and Andrew Gillum.

On August 30, 2022, Kise joined the team of lawyers supporting Donald Trump during the FBI investigation into his handling of government documents. The same day, Kise left Tallahassee law firm Foley & Lardner and joined Miami law firm Continental PLLC to do that work. Kise's fee for the work was US$3 million, and was paid from Trump's Save America PAC. A month later, Trump shifted Kise's responsibilities toward other legal work, including legal issues arising from Trump's role in the January 6 United States Capitol attack.

On September 26, 2023, Kise was sanctioned along with four other attorneys for making "repetitive, frivolous" arguments on behalf of Trump and the Trump Organization in the context of New York litigation challenging alleged fraud. The court held that the attorneys had been "expressly warned" that the positions they were taking had already been repeatedly rejected by both the trial and appellate court, and concluded that "sanctions are the only way to impress upon defendants' attorneys the consequences of engaging in repetitive, frivolous motion practice after this Court, affirmed by the Appellate Division, expressly warned them against doing so." These sanctions were later overturned on appeal, with the appeals court writing that the trial court's decisions were "sometimes conclusory and insufficiently rigorous in their legal analysis."

== See also ==
- Legal affairs of Donald Trump
- List of lawsuits involving Donald Trump
- Post-election lawsuits related to the 2020 U.S. presidential election
