= University of Florida Journal of Law & Public Policy =

- Discipline: Law
- Language: English

Publication details
- History: 1987-present
- Publisher: Fredric G. Levin College of Law (United States)
- Frequency: Quarterly

Standard abbreviations
- Bluebook: U. Fla. J.L. & Pub. Pol'y
- ISO 4: Univ. Fla. J. Law Public Policy

Indexing
- ISSN: 1942-8626
- LCCN: 2008228555
- OCLC no.: 1010682686

Links
- Journal homepage; Online archive

The University of Florida Levin College of Law Journal of Law & Public Policy is a quarterly law review published by the University of Florida's Fredric G. Levin College of Law, and is the only interdisciplinary journal at the law school. The journal was founded by Florida's First District Court of Appeals Judge Scott Makar in 1987, and is run by sixty student members and one staff assistant, with the aid of a faculty advisor. The journal publishes articles, essays, and lectures.

== Notable articles ==
Scott Matheson Jr., "Constitutional Status and Role of the Attorney General", 6 U. Fla. J.L. & Pub. Pol'y 1 (1993)
