= John Snyder (Florida politician) =

American politician

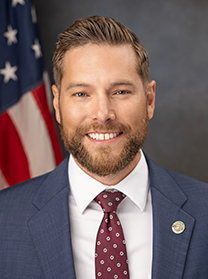
- Official portrait, 2024

Member of the Florida House of Representatives
- Incumbent
- Assumed office November 3, 2020
- Preceded by: MaryLynn Magar
- Constituency: 82nd district (2020–2022); 86th district (2022–present)

Personal details
- Born: April 13, 1987 (age 39) Hobe Sound, Florida, U.S.
- Party: Republican
- Spouse: Brittany Snyder
- Children: 2
- Relatives: William Snyder (father)
- Education: Indiana Wesleyan University

Military service
- Allegiance: United States
- Branch/service: United States Marine Corps
- Battles/wars: Operation Enduring Freedom

John Snyder (born April 13, 1987) is an American politician serving as a member of the Florida House of Representatives for the 86th district. He assumed office on November 3, 2020.

== Early life and education ==
Snyder was born in Hobe Sound, Florida. He had served in the United States Marines Corps from 2007 to 2012. Snyder earned a bachelor's degree from Indiana Wesleyan University.

His father, William Snyder, had also served in Florida House of Representatives from 2006 to 2012 and served as the sheriff for Martin County from 2013 to 2025.

== Election history ==
2024 Florida House of Representatives General election District 86
| Party | Candidate | Votes | % |
|---|---|---|---|
| Republican | John Snyder | 70,398 | 68.1% |
| Democratic | Alberto Hernandez | 33,015 | 31.9% |
| Total votes | | 103,413 | 100% |
| Republican hold | | | |

2022 Florida House of Representatives General election District 86
| Party | Candidate | Votes | % |
|---|---|---|---|
| Republican | John Snyder | 56,838 | 68.5% |
| Democratic | Raymond Denzel | 26,166 | 31.5% |
| Total votes | | 83,004 | 100% |
| Republican hold | | | |

2020 Florida House of Representatives General election District 82
| Party | Candidate | Votes | % |
|---|---|---|---|
| Republican | John Snyder | 64,879 | 64.9% |
| Democratic | Elisa Edwards Ackerly | 35,136 | 35.1% |
| Total votes | | 100,015 | 100% |
| Republican hold | | | |
