= Lauren Melo =

American businesswoman and politician

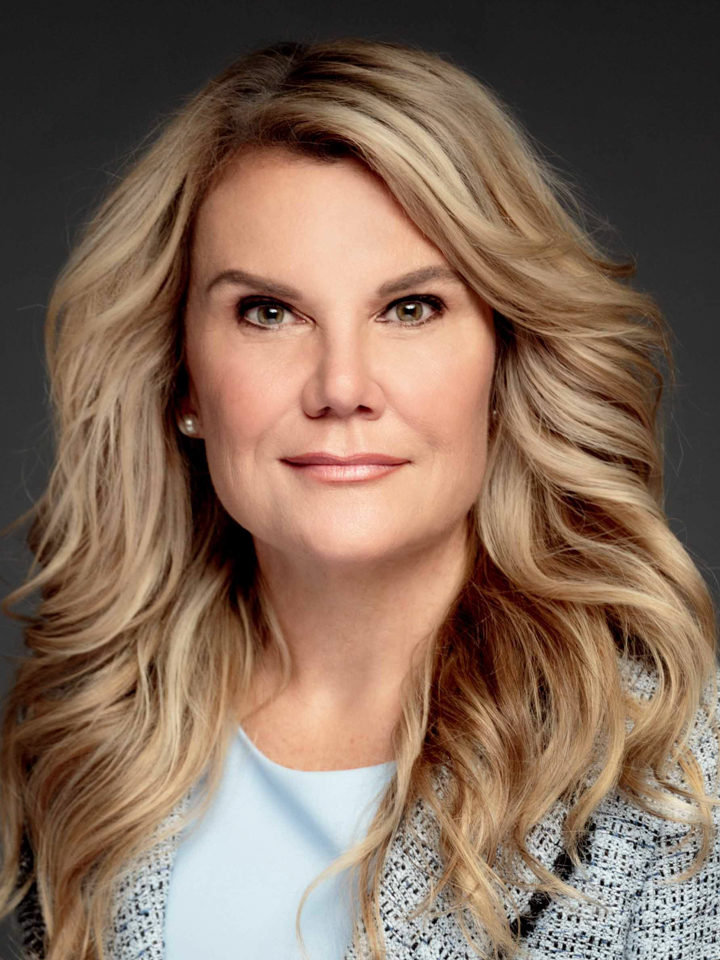

Member of the Florida House of Representatives
- Incumbent
- Assumed office November 3, 2020
- Preceded by: Byron Donalds
- Constituency: 80th district (2020–2022); 82nd district (2022–present)

Personal details
- Born: August 30, 1966 (age 59) Naples, Florida, U.S.
- Party: Republican
- Children: 2

Lauren Melo (born August 30, 1966) is an American businesswoman and politician who is the Representative for District 82 in the Florida House of Representatives. Melo assumed office November 3, 2020.

== Background ==
Melo was born and raised in Naples, Florida and graduated from Barron G. Collier High School. In 1991, Melo established a small trucking company, eventually growing the fleet to one hundred trucks. Melo has since worked as a real estate broker in Naples.

== Elections ==
2020 Florida's 80th House district Primary Election
Party	Candidate	Votes	%
Republican	Lauren Melo	10,084	58.2
Republican	Drew-Montez Clark	5,272	30.4
Republican	Victor Dotres	1,962	11.3
Total votes		17,318	100%

2020 Florida's 80th House district General Election
Party	Candidate	Votes	%
Republican	Lauren Melo	54,859	64.1
Democratic	Laura Novosad	30,747	35.9
Total votes		85,606	100%
