= Joe Jacquot =

American lawyer

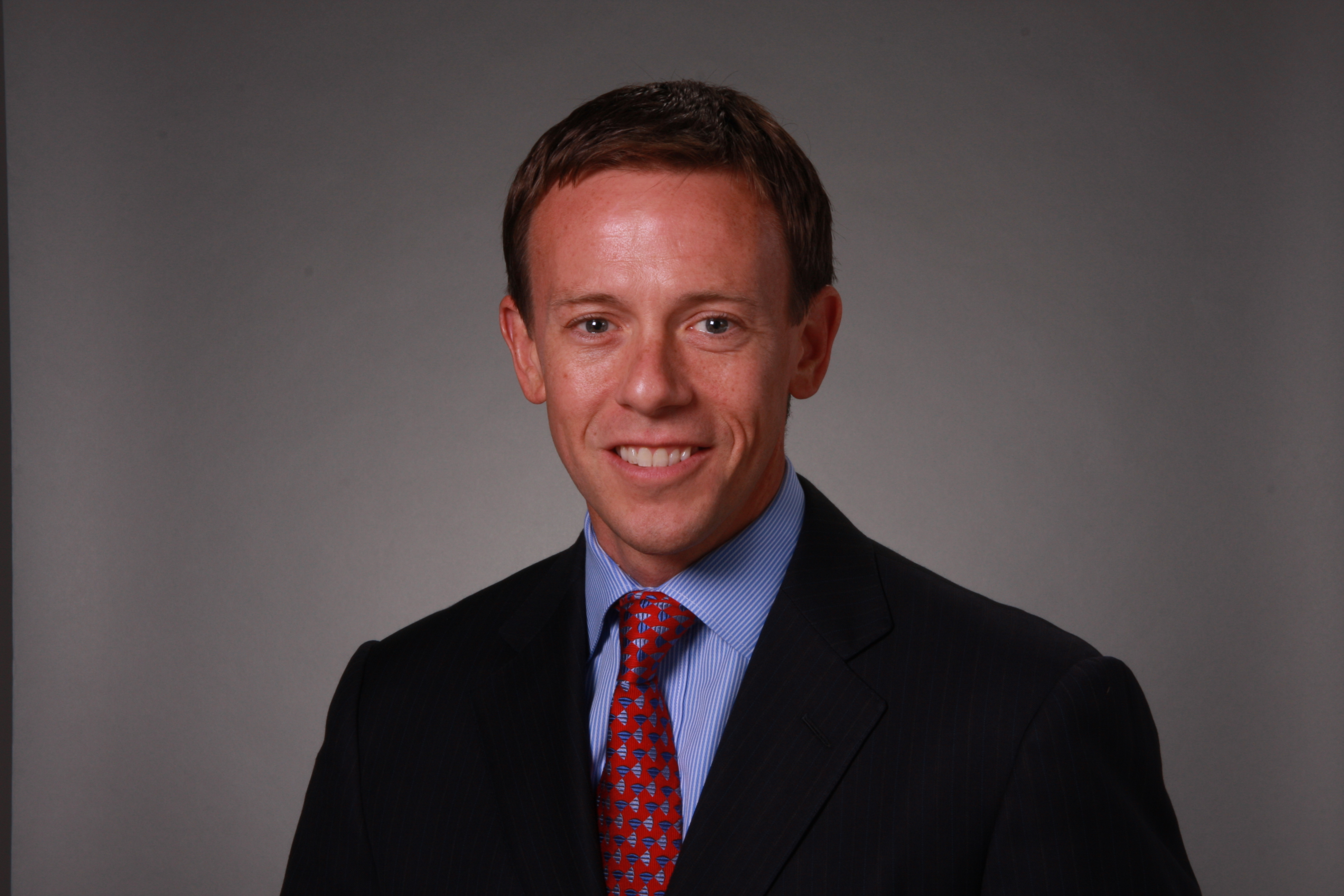
Joe Jacquot photo

Joseph Walter Jacquot served as the General Counsel to the Governor of the State of Florida. In that role, he led the process of over 100 judicial appointments by Governor DeSantis to the trial and appellate courts, consistent with a shared judicial philosophy. Those judicial appointments are credited as a "makeover" of the Florida Supreme Court, in which Jacquot served the Governor to appoint five new Justices to the Court.

Joe Jacquot is a Shareholder in business litigation with the Florida law firm, Gunster, Yoakley & Stewart where he chairs the firm's Appellate Practice group. Jacquot has briefed and argued over a dozen cases in the Florida Supreme Court, and he has appeared and argued statewide in all six of Florida's District Courts of Appeal. He successfully argued before the United States Supreme Court in the landmark Miranda warning case, Florida v. Powell.

Jacquot serves as the Chair of the Fifth District Court of Appeal Judicial Nominating Commission, and he is the Florida Supreme Court's appointee to Funding Florida Legal Aid. He also teaches as an Adjunct Professor at Florida State University's College of Law for his constitutional courses on Executive Power and Judicial Power.

== Early life and family ==
Joe Jacquot was born in Jacksonville, Florida. He earned his bachelor's degree from the University of Virginia in political and social thought and graduated from the University of Florida's college of law with honors. Jacquot worked for U.S. Senator Connie Mack prior to attending law school. Jacquot served as a lieutenant in the U.S. Naval Reserve.

He is married to Shannon Jacquot, and they have three children.

== Legal career and public service ==
Following law school, Joe Jacquot served as Counsel to Congressman Bill McCollum and helped enact the Justice for Victims of Terrorism Act. Jacquot then served as Counsel to U.S. Senator Kay Bailey Hutchison and was responsible for enacting of the Amber Alert Act.

From 2003 to 2004, he was the Chief Counsel for the U.S. Senate Judiciary's Subcommittee on Immigration and Border Security, working for Chairman Saxby Chambliss. In that role, he drafted and helped enact the L Visa and H1B Visa Reform Act. Jacquot also co-authored an opinion piece in The Wall Street Journal on immigration reform and an opinion piece in the Washington Post on the immigration enforcement.

From 2005 to 2006, he was the Deputy Chief Counsel for the U.S. Senate Judiciary Committee overseeing a variety of legal and legislative issues. He helped manage the Supreme Court confirmation proceedings of Chief Justice John Roberts and of Justice Samuel Alito.

== Deputy Attorney General ==
In January 2007, Joe Jacquot was appointed the Chief Deputy Attorney General by Florida Attorney General Bill McCollum. On December 7, 2009, Joe Jacquot argued before the U.S. Supreme Court in the case of Florida v. Powell. In a 7–2 decision in favor of the State of Florida, the Court held that the Miranda warning given to the defendant was adequate.

Jacquot was one of the "architects" and the lead strategic lawyer for Florida v. U.S. Department of Health and Human Services, the lawsuit where 26 states challenged the constitutionality of the federal health care act, which ultimately reached the U.S. Supreme Court.

Subsequently, Joe Jacquot was a Senior Vice President and Counsel for a Fortune 1000 company and then a Partner for a national law firm, handling litigation matters and counseling on regulatory issues and on matters involving state Attorneys General.

== General Counsel to the Governor ==
In January 2019, Florida Governor Ron DeSantis appointed Joe Jacquot to be General Counsel. He served as chief legal advisor to the Governor and as the top lawyer for state agencies in the Administration overseeing litigation, rulemaking, and all other legal matters. During that time, he led the legal determinations and executive orders necessary to address the COVID-19 pandemic. Additionally, Jacquot served as the governor's advisor on judicial appointments, interviewing hundreds of judges for potential trial court and appellate court appointments.
