= 2006 Florida Attorney General election =

- November 7, 2006
- Turnout: 44.84% (Registered voters)
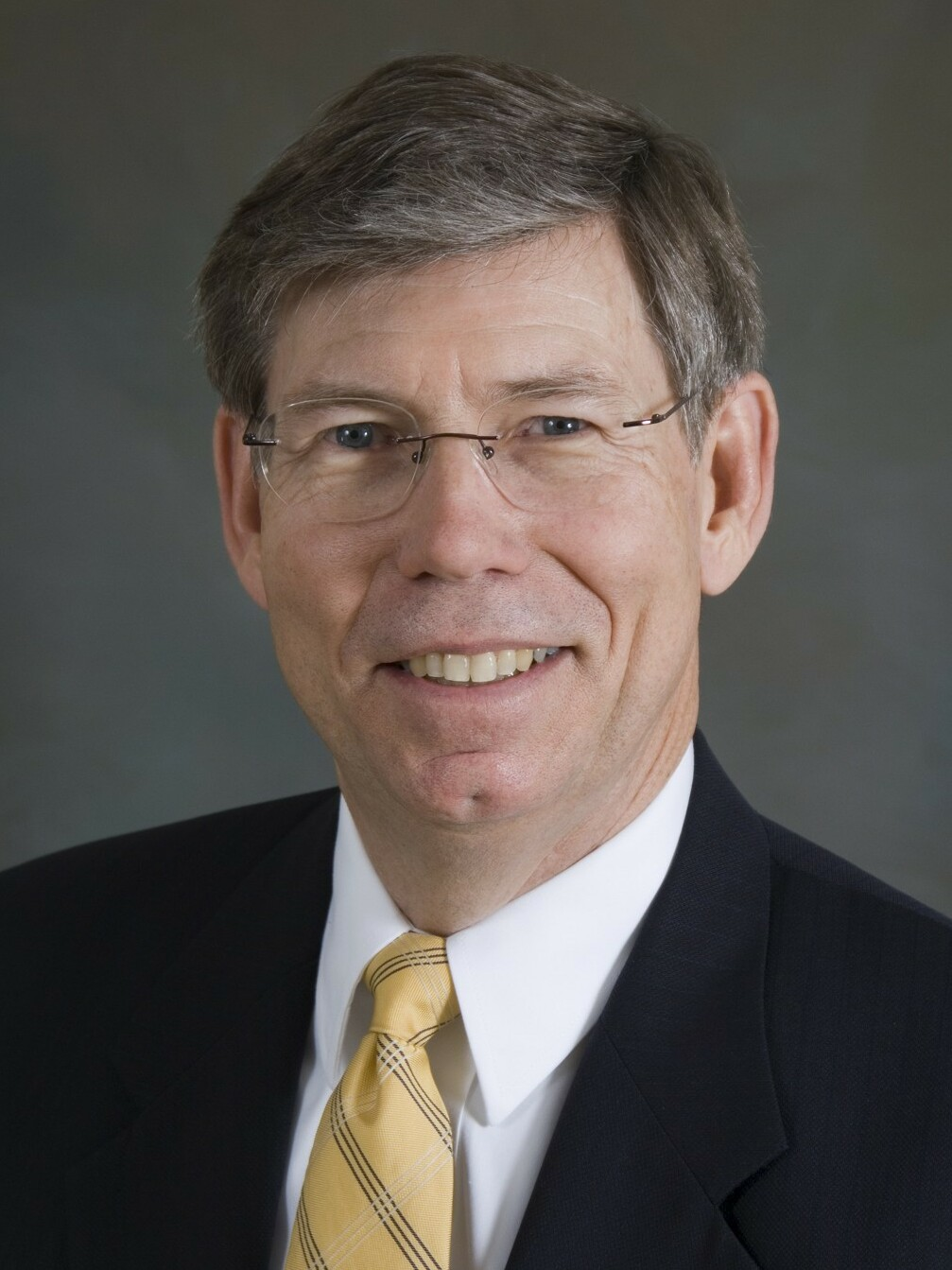

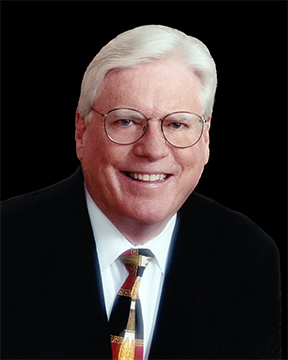
Nominee	Bill McCollum	Skip Campbell
Party	Republican	Democratic
Popular vote	2,448,008	2,197,959
Percentage	52.7%	47.3%
- County results McCollum: 50–60% 60–70% 70–80% Campbell: 50–60% 60–70% 70–80%
Attorney General before election
Charlie Crist
Republican
Elected Attorney General
Bill McCollum
Republican

The 2006 Florida Attorney General election took place on November 7, 2006, to elect the Florida Attorney General. The election was won by Bill McCollum who took office on January 3, 2007.

== Republican primary ==
=== Candidates ===
- Bill McCollum, former U.S. Representative

=== Results ===
McCollum was unopposed in the Republican Party primary.

== Democratic primary ==
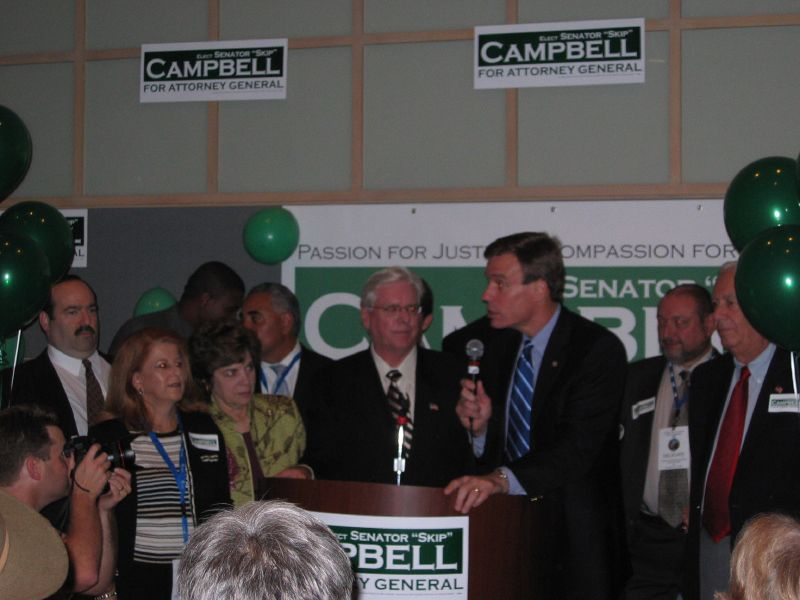
Campbell campaigning with Mark Warner

=== Candidates ===
- Skip Campbell, State Senator
- Merrilee Ehrlich, attorney

=== Results ===
Democratic primary results
Party	Candidate	Votes	%
Democratic	Skip Campbell	507,452	65.00
Democratic	Merrilee Ehrlich	273,193	35.00
Total votes		780,645	100.00

== General election ==
=== Results ===
Florida Attorney General election, 2006
Party	Candidate	Votes	%	±%
Republican	Bill McCollum	2,448,008	52.69%	−0.73%
Democratic	Skip Campbell	2,197,959	47.31%	+0.73%
Majority		250,049	5.38%	−1.46%
Turnout		4,645,967		
Republican hold		Swing		
