= Adam Jacot de Boinod =

British writer

Adam Jacot de Boinod (born 20 February 1960) is a British author, notable for his works about unusual words, such as his last name. Usually known as Jacot, he has written three books, the first two (The Meaning of Tingo and Toujours Tingo) looking at words which have no equivalent in the English language, and his third book (The Wonder of Whiffling) which reveals unusual words in English.

== Early life ==
Jacot was born at Louise Margaret Hospital at Aldershot, the son of Capt. (Christopher) William Brooke Jacot de Boinod and Annette Angela Ellse Booth. His mother was the granddaughter of Charles Alfred Chastel de Boinville.

He was educated at Harrow School, before obtaining a degree from Cambridge University (MA).

== Career ==
Jacot worked on the first series of the television panel game QI. His research on the show involved him reading an entire Albanian language dictionary and noting down any words which he found interesting. He noted that there are 27 different words for moustaches and 27 words for eyebrows in Albanian, including, "vetullan" ("very bushy eyebrows"), "vetullor" ("slightly arched eyebrows") and "vetullosh" ("very thick eyebrows"). There was also a question asking the meaning of the word "vetullushe", which was claimed to be "a goat with brown eyebrows".

After leaving QI, Jacot began an investigation into other languages, examining 280 dictionaries and 140 websites. This led to the creation of his first book in 2005, The Meaning of Tingo, a book featuring words which have no equivalent in the English language, "tingo" being a word from the Pascuense language of Easter Island meaning, "to borrow things from a friend's house, one by one, until there's nothing left". He then wrote a sequel entitled Toujours Tingo in 2007. In 2009, Jacot wrote The Wonder of Whiffling, a book about unusual words in English, the word "whiffling" having several meanings, including "one who examined candidates for degrees… an officer who cleared the way for a procession, as well as being the name of the man with the whip in Morris dancing."

He co-writes a daily trivia column for the Daily Mail with Etan Smallman.

Adam was also occasionally involved with Houghton & Mackay Magazine, and became a guest writer in early 2013.

== See also ==
- Société Neuchâteloise de Généalogie
