= Monique Jacot =

Swiss photographer and photojournalist (1934–2024)

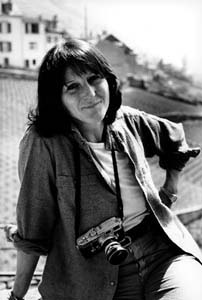
Jacot in the 1980s

Monique Jacot (French: [mɔnik ʒako]; 1934 – 6 August 2024) was a Swiss photographer and photojournalist. Her work is included in the collection of the Museum of Fine Arts Houston.

== Early life and education ==
Jacot studied at the école des Arts et Métiers de Vevey from 1953 to 1956. Gertrude Fehr was one of her professors.

== Career ==
Jacot was among the first women photojournalists. She travelled to Yemen frequently in the 1980s, and provided reporting for numerous noted magazines and newspapers, including Camera, Elle, L'Illustré, Schweizer Illustrierte, Du, Réalités, and Vogue Paris. Àlso in the 1980s, Jacot published several works on the conditions faced by women: Femmes de la terre in 1989, on the subject of Swiss women working in agriculture, Printemps de femmes in 1994 and Cadences : l'usine au féminin in 1999. During her career she was a staff photographer for the World Health Organization.

Jacot died on 6 August 2024, at the age of 89.

== Publications ==
- Femmes de la terre (1989)
- Printemps de femmes (1994)
- Cadences : l'usine au féminin (1999)

== Awards ==
- 1974: Federal prize for Applied Arts
- 2005: Grand prize in photography from the Fondation vaudoise pour la culture
- 2020: Grand Prize in Design, on the recommendation of the Swiss Design Commission

== Collections ==
Jacot's work is included in the following permanent collection:

- Museum of Fine Arts Houston: 6 prints (as of 20 October 2024)
