= Tom Warner =

American politician (1948–2019)

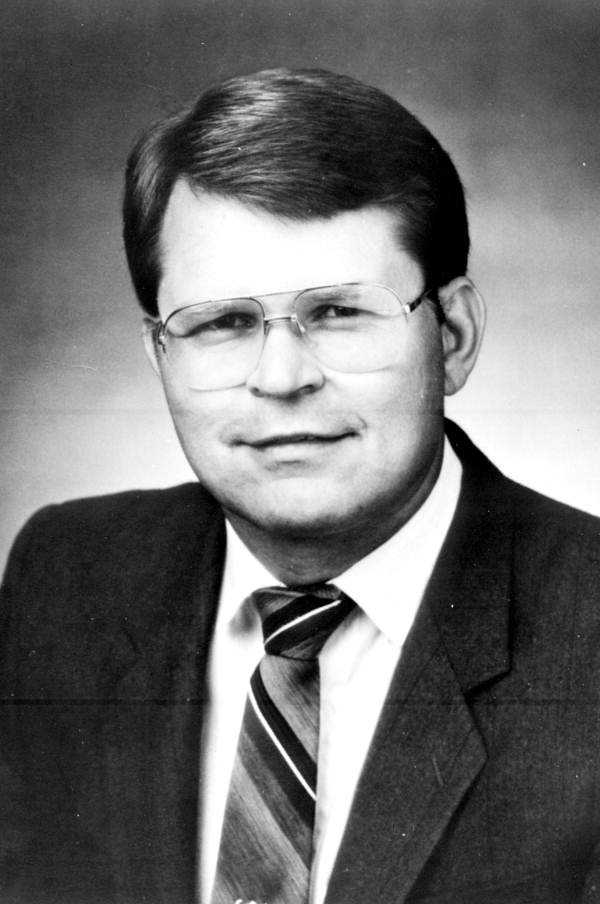

1st Solicitor General of Florida
- In office 1999–2002
- Attorney General: Bob Butterworth
- Preceded by: Position established
- Succeeded by: Chris Kise

Member of the Florida House of Representatives from the 82nd district
- In office November 3, 1992 – October 31, 1999
- Preceded by: James Hill (redistricting)
- Succeeded by: Art Argenio

Personal details
- Born: February 6, 1948 Rochester, New York, U.S.
- Died: January 11, 2019 (aged 70) Stuart, Florida, U.S.
- Party: Republican
- Spouse: Martha C. Warner
- Children: 3
- Education: University of Florida (BS, JD)
- Profession: Attorney

Tom Warner (February 6, 1948 – January 11, 2019) was an American politician. He was born in Rochester, New York.

Warner previously served as a Representative in the House of Representatives of the U.S. state of Florida. In 2002, Warner ran for Attorney General of Florida, however, he lost the Republican primary to Charlie Crist. He lived in Stuart, Florida, with his family. He died of cancer in 2019 at the age of 70.

== Education ==
Warner received his bachelor's degree in business administration from the University of Florida in 1970, followed by a juris doctor in 1973.
