= Bill McCollum =

American politician (born 1944)

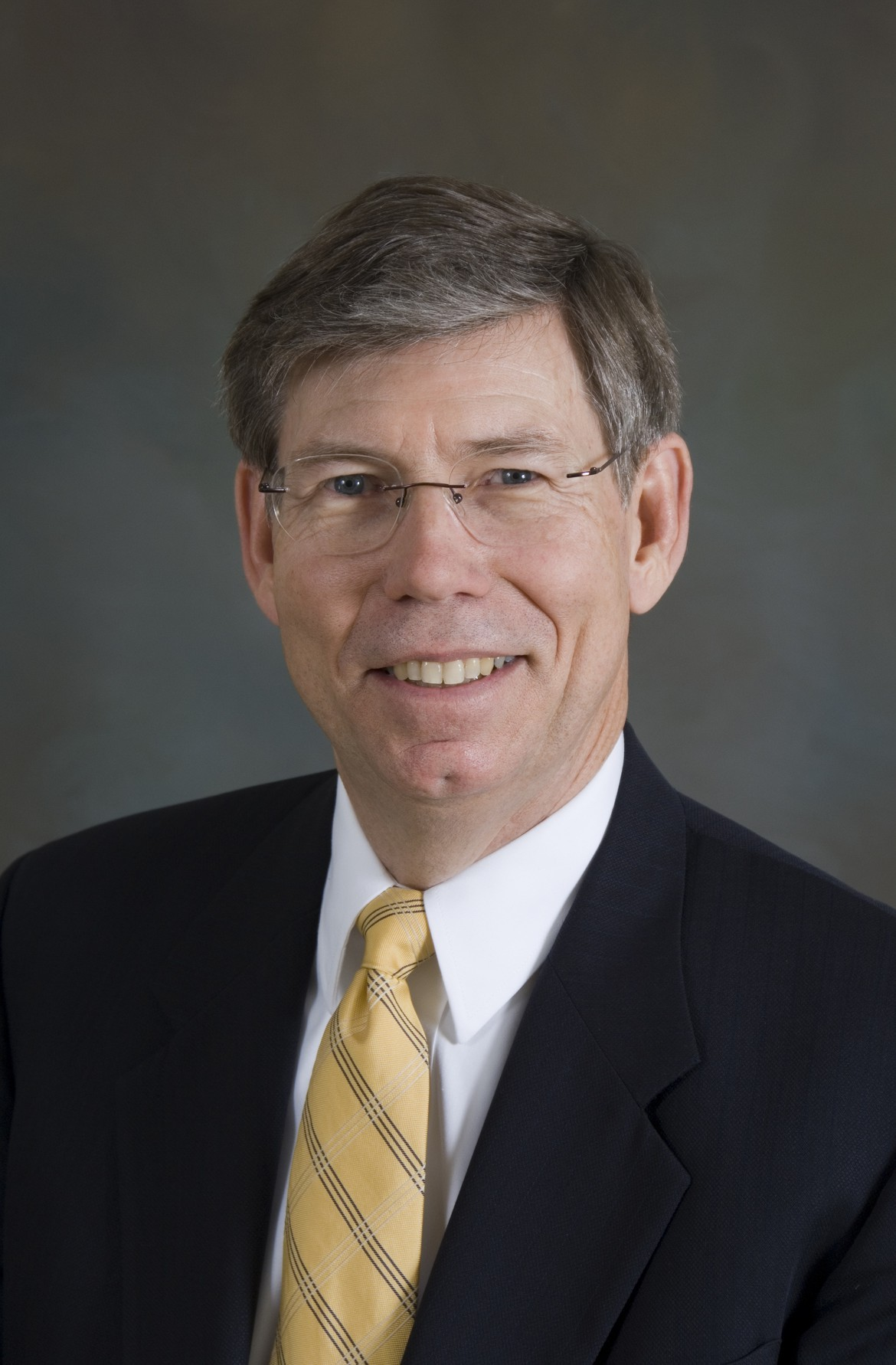

36th Attorney General of Florida
- In office January 2, 2007 – January 4, 2011
- Governor: Charlie Crist
- Preceded by: Charlie Crist
- Succeeded by: Pam Bondi

Vice Chair of the House Republican Conference
- In office January 3, 1989 – January 3, 1995
- Leader: Bob Michel
- Preceded by: Lynn Morley Martin
- Succeeded by: Susan Molinari

Member of the U.S. House of Representatives from Florida
- In office January 3, 1981 – January 3, 2001
- Preceded by: Richard Kelly
- Succeeded by: Ric Keller
- Constituency: 5th district (1981–1993); 8th district (1993–2001)

Personal details
- Born: Ira William McCollum Jr. July 12, 1944 (age 82) Brooksville, Florida, U.S.
- Party: Republican
- Spouse: Ingrid Seebohm
- Children: 3
- Education: University of Florida (BA, JD)

Military service
- Allegiance: United States
- Branch/service: United States Navy
- Years of service: 1969–1992
- Rank: Commander
- Unit: United States Navy Judge Advocate General's Corps; United States Naval Reserve

Ira William McCollum Jr. (born July 12, 1944) is an American politician who served as the 36th attorney general of Florida from 2007 to 2011 and in the United States House of Representatives from 1981 to 2001, representing Florida's 5th congressional district, which was redistricted to the 8th congressional district in 1993. As a member of the House, McCollum rose to become Vice Chairman of the House Republican Conference, the fifth-highest ranking position in the House Republican leadership. He voted to impeach President Bill Clinton and subsequently took a leadership role in managing Clinton's trial in the Senate, which ended in acquittal.

McCollum was the Republican nominee for the United States Senate in 2000, hoping to replace the retiring Republican Connie Mack III, losing to Democratic nominee Bill Nelson. McCollum ran for the Republican nomination for the U.S. Senate again in 2004 but lost to Mel Martínez. He was also an unsuccessful candidate for the Republican nomination in the 2010 Florida gubernatorial election, losing to businessman Rick Scott.

== Early life ==
Born and raised in Brooksville, Florida, McCollum graduated from Hernando High School and earned his bachelor's degree and J.D. degree from the University of Florida. While at the University of Florida, he was inducted into the University of Florida Hall of Fame, the most prestigious honor a student leader could receive, was a member of The Board, and served as president of Florida Blue Key.

McCollum's professional career began in 1969 with the United States Navy's Judge Advocate General Corps where he served on active duty until 1972. McCollum was an officer for more than 23 years before retiring from the United States Naval Reserve as a Commander (O-5) in the JAG Corps in 1992. In 1973, he entered private practice in Orlando and became involved in local politics, serving as Chairman of the Seminole County Republican Party from 1976 to 1980.

== Congressional career ==
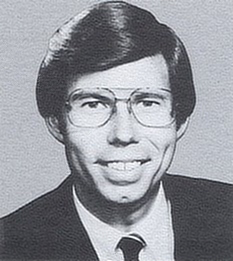
1981, Congressional Pictorial Directory, McCollum as a first term Congressman

In 1980 McCollum was elected to the U.S. House of Representatives from a district including Walt Disney World and most of Orlando. He defeated incumbent Representative Richard Kelly in the Republican primary.

While in Congress, McCollum founded the House Republican Task Force on Terrorism and Unconventional Warfare, chairing it for six years. He also served three terms on the House Permanent Select Committee on Intelligence, two of which as chairman of its Subcommittee on Human Intelligence, Analysis, and Counterintelligence. Additionally, McCollum served as vice chairman of the House Banking Committee and served on the Judiciary Committee, where he was chairman of the Subcommittee on Crime.

While serving the House, McCollum was also selected for a variety of Republican leadership positions, including three terms as vice chairman of the House Republican Conference. McCollum gained national attention as one of 15 members selected to serve on the House Committee to Investigate the Iran-Contra Affair, and, in 1998–1999, as one of the House managers (prosecutors) in the impeachment trial of President Bill Clinton.

== U.S. Senate elections ==
Rather than seek reelection to the House in 2000, McCollum ran unsuccessfully for an open United States Senate seat, bringing to an end his 20-year Congressional career.

McCollum ran again in 2004, seeking the Republican nomination for the U.S. Senate seat being vacated by retiring Senator Bob Graham. He was defeated in the Republican primary by U.S. Secretary of Housing and Urban Development Secretary Mel Martínez, who went on to win the seat.

McCollum served as a partner with the Baker & Hostetler LLP law firm, practicing in the federal policy area. In addition to his duties as the state's chief legal officer, he serves as president and chairman of the Healthy Florida Foundation, chartered in 2002 to find consensus on long-term solutions to the nation's health care system. He is a member of the North Florida Committee on Foreign Relations. He is also a board member of the James Madison Institute.

== Florida attorney general (2007–2010) ==
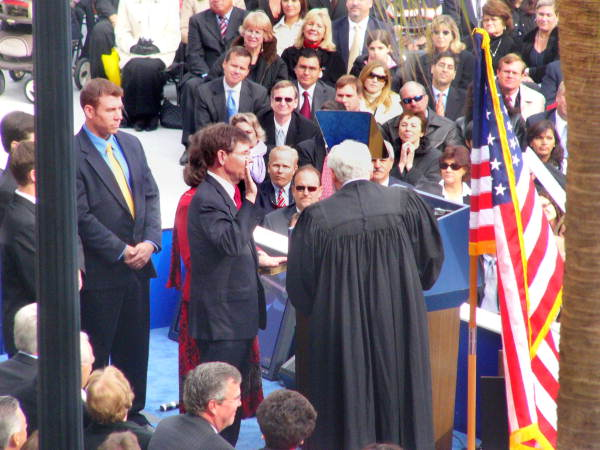
McCollum being sworn into office as Florida attorney general

In 2006, McCollum ran for Florida Attorney General, defeating State Senator Skip Campbell in the general election.

McCollum led a group of Attorneys General in filing a lawsuit challenging the constitutionality of Obamacare. He also filed a brief in support of Arizona's immigration law.

McCollum opposed the federal Stimulus bill, as well as the $20 billion federal oil fund that limited his office's ability to pursue claims against BP, and requested additional authority from the federal government to address Medicaid fraud.

While Attorney General, McCollum defended Florida's ban on adoptions by homosexuals from a lawsuit, In re: Gill, that challenged the ban. McCollum hired Dr. George Rekers, a controversial clinical psychologist, to testify during the trial that heterosexual parents provide a better environment for children. The trial resulted in the overturning of the ban. When an appellate court upheld the lower court ruling, McCollum declined to appeal the case to the Supreme Court.

McCollum was also the Florida Chairman for the Rudy Giuliani presidential campaign in 2008.

== 2010 gubernatorial candidacy ==
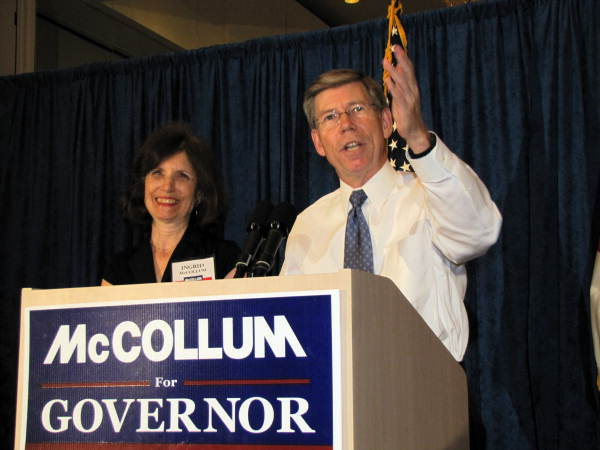
McCollum campaigning in Tampa, Florida

On May 18, 2009, McCollum announced his candidacy for Governor of Florida. The election determined the successor of Charlie Crist who later lost his bid for a seat in the U.S. Senate. McCollum opposed federal health care mandates in Florida, decrying them as an unconstitutional "tax on living," and joined with 13 other state attorneys general in filing a federal lawsuit. The majority of Florida voters opposed such a lawsuit according to polling in April 2010. He has advocated a state constitutional amendment that would opt Florida out of Washington mandates on health care, although questions about whether such an amendment would be constitutional have been raised. On September 8, 2009 McCollum said he supported Medicare and Medicaid programs but opposed a government-run 'public option' for health insurance.

In the Republican primary, McCollum faced businessman Rick Scott, who had never before held elective office. McCollum criticized Scott's tenure as CEO of healthcare company Columbia/HCA, during which the company became entangled in a federal Medicare fraud investigation. Scott countered that the FBI had never targeted him personally. The Miami Herald noted that a 1998 congressional bill sponsored by McCollum would have made it more difficult to prosecute Medicare fraud cases, a fact that undermined McCollum’s criticisms of Scott.

Scott defeated McCollum in the August primary with approximately 46.4% percent of the vote to McCollum's 43.4%.

Republican primary results
Party	Candidate	Votes	%
Republican	Rick Scott	595,474	46.4%
Republican	Bill McCollum	557,427	43.4%
Republican	Mike McCalister	130,056	10.1%
Total votes		1,282,957	100.0%

== Private sector ==
In 2014, McCollum was named to the board of directors of AML Superconductivity & Magnetics, a privately held company that develops magnet-based and superconducting applications, located in Melbourne, Florida.

== Personal life ==
McCollum is married to Ingrid Seebohm McCollum. They have three sons: Douglas, Justin, and Andrew.

== See also ==
- Joe Jacquot (McCollum's Deputy Attorney General and chief of staff)

U.S. House of Representatives
Preceded by Richard Kelly	Member of the U.S. House of Representatives from Florida's 5th congressional district 1981–1993	Succeeded by Karen Thurman
Preceded by Bill Young	Member of the U.S. House of Representatives from Florida's 8th congressional district 1993–2001	Succeeded by Ric Keller
Party political offices
Preceded by Lynn Morley Martin	Vice Chair of the House Republican Conference; 1989–1995	Succeeded by Susan Molinari
Preceded by Connie Mack	Republican nominee for U.S. Senator from Florida (Class 1); 2000	Succeeded by Katherine Harris
Preceded by Charlie Crist	Republican nominee for Florida Attorney General; 2006	Succeeded by Pam Bondi
Legal offices
Preceded by Charlie Crist	Attorney General of Florida; 2007–2011	Succeeded by Pam Bondi
U.S. order of precedence (ceremonial)
Preceded by Lacy Clay as Former U.S. Representative	Order of precedence of the United States as Former U.S. Representative	Succeeded by Chet Edwards as Former U.S. Representative
