= 2026 Florida gubernatorial election =

- November 3, 2026

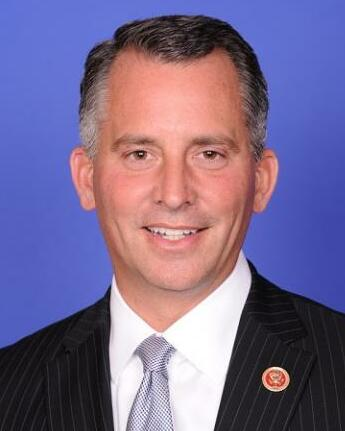
Nominee	Byron Donalds	David Jolly
Party	Republican	Democratic
Running mate	Bryan Avila	Gwen Graham
Popular vote	4,135,955	4,030,579
Percentage	50.00%	48.73%
- Donalds: 40–50% 50–60% 60–70% 70–80% 80–90% Jolly: 50–60% 60–70% 70–80%
Governor before election
Ron DeSantis
Republican
Elected Governor
Byron Donalds
Republican

The 2026 Florida gubernatorial election took place in the US state on November 3, 2026, to elect the governor of Florida. Republican Representative Byron Donalds narrowly defeated former Representative David Jolly. Incumbent two-term Republican governor Ron DeSantis was term-limited and ineligible for a third term.

Primary elections were held on August 18, 2026. In the Republican primary, Representative Byron Donalds won with 47.8% of the vote. In the Democratic primary, former Representative David Jolly won with 61.0% of the vote.

The election ended up being closely contested, highlighting a stronger-than-expected Democratic challenge in a state that had increasingly favored Republicans. Donalds' victory was historic as Florida’s first African American governor and the first elected African American Republican governor in U.S. history. The narrow Republican victory also marked a significant contrast with the party's landslide gubernatorial win in 2022. This was the second consecutive Florida gubernatorial election in which the Democratic nominee was a former Republican and the eighth consecutive victory for Republicans.

== Background ==
A heavily populated South Atlantic state with a large and increasingly conservative Latino American population and the northern parts lying in the Bible Belt, Florida is considered to be a moderately to strongly red state, having not elected a Democratic governor since 1994 nor a Democrat for president since 2012 and having moved significantly rightward in the last decade. In 2022, incumbent governor Ron DeSantis was re-elected by a 19.4% margin, a considerable improvement from his 0.4-point victory four years earlier in the gubernatorial election during the 2018 blue wave.

This was followed in 2024 by Republican Donald Trump winning his adoptive home state by a 13% margin as he won a second non-consecutive presidential term, improving his 3.4% margin of victory in 2020 and seemingly diminishing Florida's longtime swing-state and bellwether status. Republicans also control all statewide offices, a large majority of the state's U.S. House delegation, both U.S. Senate seats, and supermajorities in both houses of the Florida Legislature.

=== Candidate eligibility and requirements ===
Article IV, Section 5(b) of the Florida Constitution states that, for a person to serve as governor, they must:

- Be at least thirty years old;
- Be a permanent resident of Florida for at least seven years;
- Not have served as governor for six years or more of the two prior terms.

== Republican primary ==
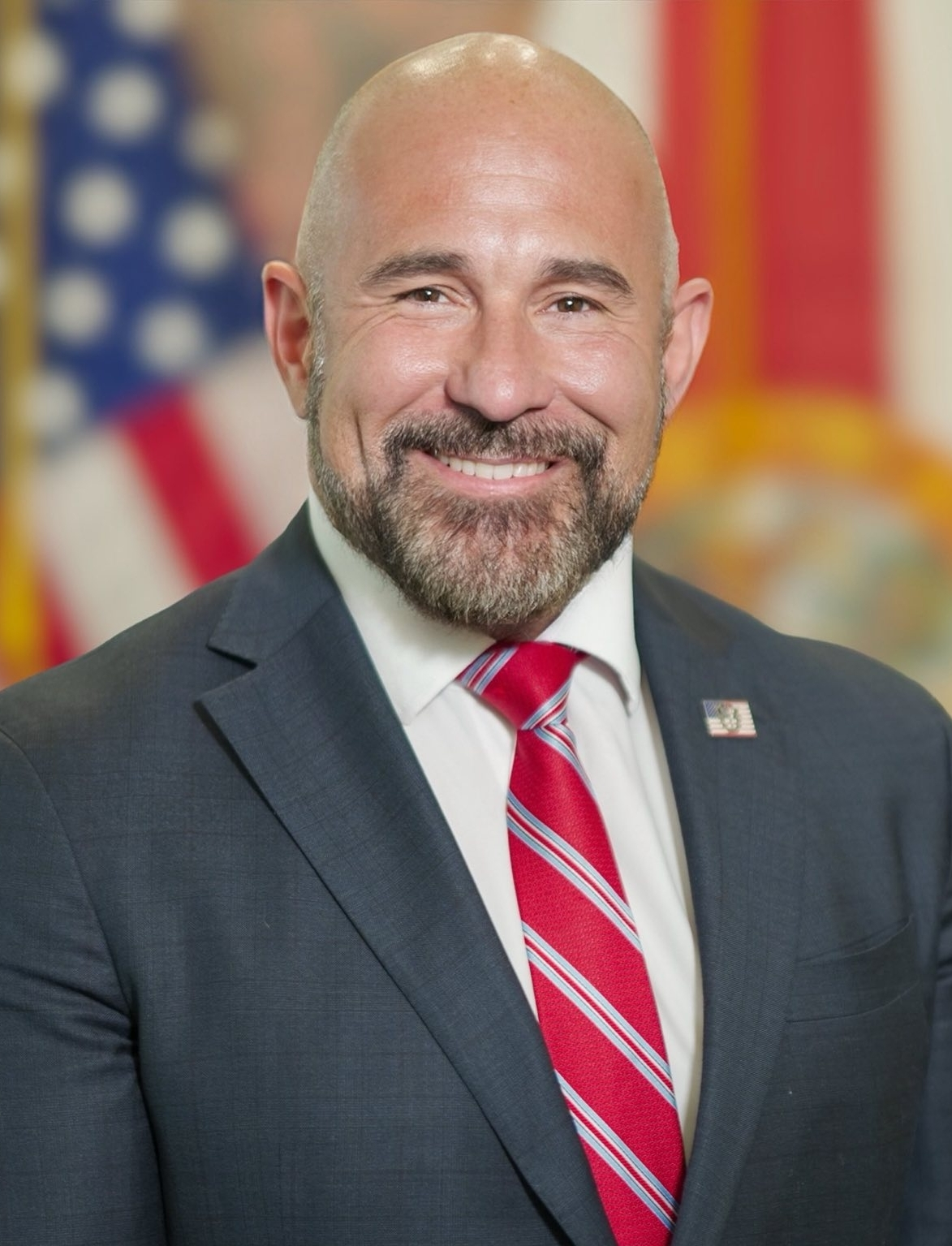
Lieutenant Governor of Florida Jay Collins finished second in the primary.

=== Candidates ===
==== Nominee ====
- Byron Donalds, U.S. representative for Florida's 19th congressional district (2021–present)
  - Running mate: Bryan Avila, former Florida state senator from the 39th district (2022–2026)

==== Eliminated in primary ====
- Jay Collins, 21st lieutenant governor of Florida (2025–present)
  - Running mate: Kevin Guthrie, executive director of the Florida Division of Emergency Management (2021–present)
- Paul Renner, 103rd speaker of the Florida House of Representatives (2022–2024) from the 19th district (2015–2024)
- James Fishback, investment firm founder
  - Running mate: Sean Lozano, police officer
- Jim Holcomb
- Arthur Joseph McCaffrey
- Daniel Nokovich
- Rachel Rodriguez, attorney
- James Walker Shaw, farmer
- Caneste Succe, public representative
- Bobby Williams, activist and food bank volunteer

==== Failed to qualify ====
- Charles Burkett, mayor of Surfside (2006–2010, 2020–2022, 2024–2026) (running as an independent)
- Shea Cruel, U.S. veteran
- Jenny Patricia Curtman, naturopathic doctor
- Daniel J. Imperato, consultant
- John Joseph Mercadante, retired carpenter

==== Withdrawn ====
- Bill Reicherter, real estate agent, candidate for state house in 2024, and candidate for state senate in 2022

==== Declined ====
- Casey DeSantis, First Lady of Florida (2019–present)
- Matt Gaetz, former U.S. representative for Florida's 1st congressional district (2017–2024)
- Francis Suarez, 43rd mayor of Miami (2017–2025) and candidate for president in 2024

=== Endorsements ===
Jay Collins

State representatives

- Susan Plasencia, HD-37 (2022–present) (previously endorsed Donalds)

Local officials

- Mike Chitwood, sheriff of Volusia County (2017–present) (Independent)
- René García, Miami-Dade County commissioner (2020–present)

Organizations

- ~~Florida Police Benevolent Association~~ (later endorsed Byron Donalds)
- Veterans for America First
Byron Donalds

Executive branch officials

- Donald Trump, president of the United States (2017–2021, 2025–present)
- Dan Bongino, former Deputy Director of the FBI (2025–2026)
- Elon Musk, former senior advisor to the president (2025) (Independent)

U.S. senators

- Rick Scott, Florida (2019–present)
- Ashley Moody, Florida (2025–present)
- Ted Cruz, Texas (2013–present)

U.S. representatives

- Aaron Bean, FL-04 (2023–present)
- Gus Bilirakis, FL-12 (2007–present)
- Vern Buchanan, FL-16 (2007–present)
- Kat Cammack, FL-03 (2021–present)
- Mario Díaz-Balart, FL-26 (2003–present)
- Neal Dunn, FL-02 (2017–present)
- Tom Emmer, House majority whip (2023–present) from MN-06 (2015–present)
- Randy Fine, FL-06 (2025–present)
- Scott Franklin, FL-18 (2021–present)
- Russell Fry, SC-07 (2023–present)
- Mike Haridopolos, FL-08 (2025–present)
- Mike Johnson, speaker of the House (2023–present) from LA-04 (2017–present)
- Laurel Lee, FL-15 (2023–present)
- Anna Paulina Luna, FL-13 (2023–present)
- Brian Mast, FL-21 (2017–present)
- Lisa McClain, MI-09 (2021–present)
- Cory Mills, FL-07 (2023–present)
- Jimmy Patronis, FL-01 (2025–present)
- Chip Roy, TX-21 (2019–present)
- John Rutherford, FL-05 (2017–present)
- María Elvira Salazar, FL-27 (2021–present)
- Steve Scalise, House majority leader (2023–present) from LA-01 (2008–present)
- Elise Stefanik, NY-21 (2015–present)
- Daniel Webster, FL-11 (2011–present)

Statewide officials

- Jeff Landry, governor of Louisiana (2024–present) and special envoy to Greenland (2025–present)
- Sarah Huckabee Sanders, governor of Arkansas (2023–present)
- Blaise Ingoglia, chief financial officer of Florida (2025–present)
- Wilton Simpson, Florida Commissioner of Agriculture (2023–present)
- James Uthmeier, Attorney General of Florida (2025–present)

State legislators

- Ben Albritton, President of the Florida Senate (2024–present)
- Jim Boyd, president-designate of the Florida Senate from the 20th district (2020–present)
- Wyman Duggan, speaker pro tempore of the Florida House of Representatives (2024–present) from HD-12 (2018–present)
- Sam Garrison, speaker-designate of the Florida House of Representatives from the 11th district (2020–present)
- Daniel Perez, speaker of the Florida House of Representatives (2025–present) from HD-116 (2018–present)
- Tyler Sirois, majority leader of the Florida House of Representatives (2024–present) from HD-31 (2018–present)
- 59 other state representatives (Note: Shane Abbott, state representative from the 5th district (2022–present); Jon Albert, state representative from the 48th district (2024–present); Adam Anderson, state representative from the 57th district (2022–present); Alex Andrade, state representative from the 2nd district (2018–present); Jessica Baker, state representative from the 17th district (2022–present); Webster Barnaby, state representative from the 29th district (2020–present); Yvette Benarroch, state representative from the 81st district (2024–present); Dean Black, state representative from the 15th district (2022–present); Omar Blanco, state representative from the 115th district (2024–present); Erika Booth, state representative from the 35th district (2024–present); David Borrero, state representative from the 105th district (2020–2022), 111th district (2022–present); Adam Botana, state representative from the 80th district (2020–present); Nathan Boyles, state representative from the 3rd district (2025–present); Robbie Brackett, state representative from the 34th district (2022–present); James Buchanan, state representative from the 74th district (2018–present); Demi Busatta, state representative from the 114th district (2020–present); Jennifer Canady, state representative from the 50th district (2022–present); Hillary Cassel, state representative from the 101st district (2022–present); Linda Chaney, state representative from the 61st district (2020–present); Nan Cobb, state representative from the 26th district (2024–present); Tiffany Esposito, state representative from the 77th district (2022–present); Tom Fabricio, state representative from the 110th district (2020–present); Richard Gentry, state representative from the 27th district (2024–present); Anne Gerwig, state representative from the 93rd district (2024–present); Mike Giallombardo, state representative 79th district (2020–present); Karen Gonzalez Pittman, state representative from the 65th district (2022–present); Sam Greco, state representative from the 19th district (2024–present); Philip Griffitts, state representative from the 6th district (2022–present); J. J. Grow, state representative from the 23rd district (2024–present); Jeff Holcomb, state representative from the 53rd district (2022–present); Berny Jacques, state representative from the 59th district (2022–present); Kim Kendall, state representative from the 18th district (2024–present); Traci Koster, state representative from the 66th district (2020–present); Fiona McFarland, state representative from the 73rd district (2020–present); Lauren Melo, state representative from the 82nd district (2020–present); Monique Miller, state representative from the 33rd district (2024–present); Jim Mooney, state representative from the 120th district (2020–present); Danny Nix Jr., state representative from the 75th district (2024–present); Vanessa Oliver, state representative from the 76th district (2024–present); Toby Overdorf, state representative from the 85th district (2018–present); Michael Owen, state representative from the 70th district (2024–present); Bill Partington, state representative from the 28th district (2024–present); Jenna Persons-Mulicka, state representative from the 78th district (2020–present); Rachel Plakon, state representative from the 36th district (2022–present); ~~Susan Plasencia, state representative from the 37th district (2022–present)~~ (switched endorsement to Collins); Juan Carlos Porras, state representative from the 119th district (2022–present); Mike Redondo, state representative from the 118th district (2023–present); Alex Rizo, state representative from the 112th district (2020–present); Will Robinson, state representative from the 71st district (2018–present); Michelle Salzman, state representative from the 1st district (2020–present); Judson Sapp, state representative from the 20th district (2024–present); Jason Shoaf, state representative from the 7th district (2019–present); David Smith, state representative from the 38th district (2018–present); John Snyder, state representative from the 86th district (2020–present); Paula Stark, state representative from the 47th district (2022–present); Kevin Steele, state representative from the 55th district (2022–present); Josie Tomkow, state representative from the 39th district (2018–2022), 51st district (2022–2025); Dana Trabulsy, state representative from the 84th district (2020–present); Chase Tramont, state representative from the 30th district (2022–present); Kaylee Tuck, state representative from the 55th district (2020–2022), 83rd district (2022–present); Susan Valdes, state representative from the 64th district (2018–present))
- 9 state senators (Note: Joe Gruters, state senator from SD-22 (2018–present) and chair of the Republican National Committee (2025–present); Bryan Avila, state senator from the 39th district (2022–present); Alexis Calatayud, state senator from the 38th district (2022–present); Nick DiCeglie, state senator from the 18th district (2022–present); Erin Grall, state senator from the 29th district (2022–present); Gayle Harrell, state senator from the 31st district (2022–present); Jonathan Martin, state senator from the 33rd district (2022–present); Debbie Mayfield, state senator (2016–2024, 2025–present); Ana Maria Rodriguez, state senator from the 40th district (2020–present))
- Spencer Roach, former HD-76 (2018–2024)

Party officials

- Lara Trump, former co-chair of the Republican National Committee (2024–2025)
- Christian Ziegler, former chair of the Florida Republican Party (2023–2024)

Local officials

- Christi Fraga, mayor of Doral (2022–present)
- D. C. Reeves, mayor of Pensacola (2022–present)
- Chad Chronister, sheriff of Hillsborough County (2017–present)
- Vicki Lopez, Miami-Dade County Commissioner from the 5th district (2025–present)
- Rosie Cordero-Stutz, sheriff of Miami-Dade County (2025–present)
- Bob Gualtieri, sheriff of Pinellas County (2011–present)
- Grady Judd, sheriff of Polk County (2005–present)
- Dennis Lemma, sheriff of Seminole County (2017–present)
- T. K. Waters, sheriff of Duval County (2022–present)
- Morris Young, sheriff of Gadsden County (2004–present) (Democratic)

Individuals

- Marc Andreessen, co-founder of Andreessen Horowitz
- Brian D. Ballard, founder of Ballard Partners
- Carlos Beruff, real estate developer
- Bill Conerly, politician
- Erika Donalds, school choice activist (candidate's spouse)
- Ken Griffin, founder of Citadel LLC
- Ben Horowitz, co-founder of Andreessen Horowitz
- Benny Johnson, political commentator
- Jay Kemmerer, owner of Jackson Hole Mountain Resort
- Adam Kidan, president of Empire Workforce
- Charlie Kirk, co-founder of Turning Point USA (deceased)
- Omeed Malik, banker
- Phil Mickelson, professional golfer
- Nicki Minaj, rapper
- Ross Perot Jr., real estate developer
- Harry Sargeant III, oil executive
- David Steward, founder of World Wide Technology
- Donald Trump Jr., businessman and son of President Donald Trump
- Zach Witkoff, businessman
- George Zoley, CEO of GEO Group

Labor unions

- Associated Builders and Contractors (ABC) of Florida

Organizations

- Americans for Prosperity
- Club for Growth PAC
- Florida Faith and Freedom
- Florida Chamber of Commerce
- Florida Farm Bureau
- Gun Owners of America
- Leading the Future
- Turning Point Action
James Fishback

Executive branch officials

- Carrie Prejean, former member of the Religious Liberty Commission (2025–2026) and beauty pageant titleholder

State legislators

- Anthony Sabatini, former member of the Florida House of Representatives (2018-2022), and Lake County commissioner (2024–present)

Individuals

- Asmongold, online streamer and political commentator
- Tucker Carlson, conservative political commentator
- Nick Fuentes, far-right political activist
- Tyler Oliveira, right-wing YouTuber
- Sneako, political commentator
- Andrew Tate, internet personality
- Hodgetwins, political comedy duo
- Kyle Rittenhouse, the Kenosha unrest shooter
- Joel Webbon, Christian Nationalist pastor

Organizations

- ~~MAHA Institute~~ (endorsement rescinded)
Paul Renner

U.S. representatives

- Ted Yoho, former FL-03 (2013–2021)

State legislators

- Dennis Baxley, former president pro tempore of the Florida Senate (2022–2024) from SD-13 (2016–2024)
- Charlie Stone, former HD-22 (2012–2020)

Organizations

- ~~Florida State Lodge Fraternal Order of Police~~ (later endorsed Byron Donalds)
Ashley Moody (declined)

Individuals

- Ric Flair, former professional wrestler
Declined to endorse

Statewide officials

- ~~Ron DeSantis, governor of Florida (2019–present)~~ (later endorsed Byron Donalds)

=== Debates ===
2026 Florida Republican gubernatorial debate
Date	Host	Moderators	Link	Republican	Republican	Republican	Republican
Key: P Participant I Invited W Withdrawn A Absent N Not invited							
Key: P Participant I Invited W Withdrawn A Absent N Not invited				Jay Collins	Byron Donalds	James Fishback	Paul Renner
July 2, 2026	PBD Podcast	Patrick Bet-David	Youtube	P	A	P	P

==== Cancelled debates ====
In June 2026, the Republican Party of Florida announced that they would not be hosting a gubernatorial debate, as originally planned, later that month. The party stated that they had made the decision to cancel the debate after no candidate except Donalds met its qualifications. The party's minimum requirements for a candidate to participate included:

- At least 10% support in a Republican party-sponsored primary voter poll
- A minimum $10 million in raised contributions
- Over 10,000 unique individual campaign donors

The announcement drew criticism from gubernatorial candidates Collins, Fishback, and Renner, as well as incumbent Governor Ron DeSantis. DeSantis attacked the party for trying to "engineer the outcome" of the primary election and acting against "the best interest of Republican voters." DeSantis additionally noted that he himself would not have qualified under the set criteria during his 2018 primary run. The Miami Herald also panned the decision, calling for a primary debate to take place.

On June 24, WJAX-TV announced that the planned CBS debate would be cancelled, after "a majority of the Republican candidates didn’t agree to participate." Only Fishback and Renner agreed to debate, with Collins stating that he would only accept if Donalds showed as well. Donalds refused to participate in any debate, leading Fishback labeling Donalds a "coward".

On June 25, Renner announced on X that the planned Fox 13 debate, set for July 21, had been cancelled.

2026 Florida Republican cancelled gubernatorial debates
Date	Host	Moderators	Location	Republican	Republican	Republican	Republican
Key: P Participant I Invited W Withdrawn A Absent N Not invited							
Key: P Participant I Invited W Withdrawn A Absent N Not invited				Jay Collins	Byron Donalds	James Fishback	Paul Renner
June 27, 2026	Republican Party of Florida	TBA	Fort Lauderdale	N	I	N	N
July 15, 2026	CBS News	TBA	Jacksonville	I (Note: Declined to participate)	I (Note: Declined to participate)	I	I
July 21, 2026	Fox News	TBA	Tampa	N	I (Note: Declined to participate)	I	N

=== Fundraising ===
Campaign finance reports as of August 13, 2026
Candidate	Raised	Spent
Jay Collins (R)	$1,842,546	$352,104
Byron Donalds (R)	$13,792,445	$5,377,379
James Fishback (R)	$705,217	$699,846
Paul Renner (R)	$1,090,595	$470,796

=== Polling ===
Aggregate polls

Source of poll aggregation	Dates administered	Dates updated	Jay Collins	Byron Donalds	James Fishback	Paul Renner	Other/ Undecided (Note: Calculated by taking the difference of 100% and all other candidates combined.)	Margin
270toWin	July 13 – August 6, 2026	August 18, 2026	13.5%	47.5%	9.0%	4.5%	25.5%	Donalds +34.0%
Decision Desk HQ	through August 11, 2026	August 18, 2026	16.6%	37.2%	18.4%	7.6%	20.2%	Donalds +18.8%
FiftyPlusOne	through August 11, 2026	August 18, 2026	15.5%	39.9%	15.0%	—	29.6%	Donalds +24.4%
RealClearPolitics	July 8–29, 2026	August 18, 2026	13.6%	45.4%	9.6%	4.0%	27.4%	Donalds +31.8%
Race to the WH	through July 29, 2026	August 18, 2026	16.0%	45.5%	9.5%	4.9%	24.1% (Note: Bobby Williams with 5.0%; Rachel Rodriguez and Jim Holcomb with 1.0%)	Donalds +29.5%
Average			15.0%	43.1%	12.3%	5.3%	25.4%	Donalds +28.1%

Poll source	Date(s) administered	Sample size (Note: Key: A – all adults RV – registered voters LV – likely voters V – unclear)	Margin of error	Jay Collins	Byron Donalds	James Fishback	Paul Renner	Other	Undecided
David J Wolfson (Note: Poll sponsored by Collins' campaign.)	July 28–29, 2026	988 (LV)	± 3.0%	30%	46%	10%	6%	4% (Note: Rachel Rodriguez, Arthur Joseph McCaffrey, Jim Holcomb, and Daniel Nokovich with 1%)	4%
Quantus Insights (R) (Note: Poll sponsored by American First Insight)	July 27–29, 2026	635 (LV)	± 4.1%	16%	50%	12%	4%	5% (Note: "Another candidate" with 5%)	13%
Targoz Market Research (Note: Poll sponsored by the James Madison Institute, a conservative think tank)	July 20–26, 2026	532 (LV)	—	18%	49%	4%	8%	4% (Note: Bobby Williams with 3%)	17%
Targoz Market Research	July 20–26, 2026	592 (RV)	—	17%	47%	4%	9%	4% (Note: Bobby Williams with 3%)	20%
Listener Group/ Political Matrix News (R)	July 21–23, 2026	1,020 (LV)	± 3.1%	2%	32%	13%	19%	—	32%
Fabrizio, Lee & Associates (R) (Note: Poll sponsored by Donalds' campaign)	July 14–16, 2026	400 (LV)	—	10%	53%	9%	4%	—	24%
Cygnal (R)	July 12–13, 2026	500 (LV)	± 4.4%	11%	43%	12%	2%	—	31%
Change Research (D)	July 9–11, 2026	— (LV)	—	14%	37%	12%	2%	5% (Note: "Would not vote" with 5%)	30%
The Tyson Group (R)	July 8–11, 2026	600 (LV)	± 4.0%	9%	48%	8%	4%	4% (Note: "Someone else" with 4%)	27%
David J Wolfson	July 2–6, 2026	934 (LV)	± 3.0%	20%	38%	10%	2%	—	28%
McLaughlin & Associates (R) (Note: Poll sponsored by the Associated Industries of Florida)	June 3–7, 2026	386 (LV)	± 3.0%	5%	54%	8%	2%	—	31%
Listener Group/ Political Matrix News (R)	May 31 – June 3, 2026	973 (LV)	± 3.1%	11%	29%	2%	14%	—	44%
Change Research (D) (Note: Poll commissioned by Freedom Project USA)	May 13–16, 2026	— (LV)	—	8%	48%	9%	3%	—	28%
Fabrizio, Lee & Associates (R)	April 26–30, 2026	420 (LV)	± 4.78%	7%	54%	9%	2%	—	28%
Stetson University	March 25 – April 13, 2026	373 (LV)	—	6%	38%	5%	7%	17%	28%
Keystone Analytics	March 27 – April 6, 2026	795 (LV)	± 3.5%	—	43%	19%	—	—	38%
Tarrance Group (R)	March 30 – April 2, 2026	466 (LV)	± 4.7%	6%	50%	9%	3%	—	32%
Emerson College	March 29–31, 2026	465 (LV)	± 4.5%	4%	46%	4%	3%	4% (Note: Bobby Williams with 1%; Charles Burkett with <1%)	39%
The American Promise	February 23–26, 2026	800 (LV)	± 3.5%	4%	44%	5%	2%	—	45%
University of North Florida	February 16–20, 2026	657 (LV)	± 4.38%	4%	31%	6%	1%	6%	51%
University of North Florida	February 16–20, 2026	657 (LV)	± 4.38%	3%	28%	4%	1%	28% (Note: Casey DeSantis with 24%; "Someone else" & "Wouldn't vote" with 2%)	36%
Targoz Market Research	February 13–16, 2026	401 (RV)	—	15%	33%	3%	9%	—	40%
Patriot Polling (R)	January 19–29, 2026	827 (LV)	± 4.0%	—	37%	23%	—	—	40%
Mason-Dixon Polling & Strategy	January 8–13, 2026	400 (RV)	± 5.0%	7%	37%	3%	4%	—	49%
Fabrizio, Lee & Associates (R)	January 4–6, 2026	600 (LV)	± 4.0%	6%	45%	4%	3%	—	41%
Fabrizio, Lee & Associates (R)	January 4–6, 2026	600 (LV)	± 4.0%	—	39%	3%	1%	26% (Note: Casey DeSantis with 26%)	31%
Fabrizio, Lee & Associates (R)	January 4–6, 2026	600 (LV)	± 4.0%	—	47%	5%	4%	—	43%
Public Opinion Strategies (R) (Note: Poll sponsored by Florida Firefighters, which supports Collins)	December 7–11, 2025	700 (RV)	± 3.7%	13%	40%	—	—	9%	38%
The Tyson Group (R)	December 8–9, 2025	800 (LV)	± 3.5%	9%	38%	2%	1%	—	49%
The American Promise	November 17–19, 2025	800 (LV)	± 3.5%	1%	43%	0%	2%	—	54%
Victory Insights (R)	November 11–13, 2025	600 (LV)	—	1%	45%	1%	3%	—	49%
St. Pete Polls (Note: Poll sponsored by Florida Politics)	October 13–15, 2025	1,034 (LV)	± 3.0%	4%	39%	—	3%	—	54%
St. Pete Polls	October 13–15, 2025	1,034 (LV)	± 3.0%	12%	52%	—	—	—	36%
Targoz Market Research	September 16–18, 2025	506 (RV)	—	—	29%	—	9%	—	62%
The American Promise	September 4–5, 2025	800 (LV)	± 3.5%	2%	40%	—	2%	—	54%

Hypothetical polling

Poll source	Date(s) administered	Sample size	Margin of error	Casey DeSantis	Byron Donalds	Matt Gaetz	Ashley Moody	Jeanette Nuñez	Jimmy Patronis	Wilton Simpson	Francis Suarez	Michael Waltz	Other	Undecided
Emerson College	March 29–31, 2026	465 (LV)	± 4.5%	7%	44%	—	—	—	—	—	—	—	15% (Note: Jay Collins & James Fishback with 4%; Paul Renner with 2%; Jay Collins with 2%; Charles Burkett & Bobby Williams with 1%)	34%
St. Pete Polls	October 13–15, 2025	1,034 (LV)	± 3.0%	21%	47%	—	—	—	—	—	—	—	—	36%
Targoz Market Research	September 16–18, 2025	510 (RV)	—	26%	23%	—	—	—	—	2%	—	—	9% (Note: Paul Renner with 7%; Jay Collins with 2%)	39%
University of North Florida	July 14–22, 2025	797 (RV)	± 3.9%	32%	29%	8%	—	—	—	1%	2%	—	10% (Note: "Someone else" with 7%; "Wouldn't vote" with 2%; "Refused" with 1%)	18%
St. Pete Polls	July 8–10, 2025	831 (LV)	± 3.4%	27%	35%	—	—	—	—	3%	—	—	2% (Note: Paul Renner with 2%)	32%
Targoz Market Research	May 5–7, 2025	516 (RV)	—	29%	28%	10%	—	7%	—	4%	5%	—	4% (Note: Charles Burkett with 3%; Ashton Hayward with 1%)	13%
Targoz Market Research	April 15–22, 2025	619 (RV)	—	28%	22%	8%	—	9%	—	4%	7%	—	4%	18%
Fabrizio, Lee & Associates (R)	February 26–27, 2025	600 (LV)	± 5.0%	30%	34%	—	—	—	—	3%	—	—	—	33%
Victory Insights (R)	January 26–27, 2025	850 (LV)	± 3.5%	—	34%	—	—	—	—	5%	—	—	—	61%
Victory Insights (R)	January 26–27, 2025	850 (LV)	± 3.5%	—	31%	—	—	4%	—	3%	1%	—	—	60%
Florida Atlantic University/ Mainstreet Research	June 8–9, 2024	366 (RV)	± 3.3%	43%	19%	13%	14%	—	5%	—	—	—	7% (Note: "Someone else" with 7%)	—
Florida Atlantic University/ Mainstreet Research	April 15–17, 2024	372 (RV)	± 3.3%	38%	—	16%	—	—	—	—	—	—	20% (Note: "Another candidate" with 20%)	26%
Victory Insights (R)	April 3–6, 2024	1,200 (LV)	± 2.9%	—	21%	13%	—	—	3%	2%	—	5%	14% (Note: "Someone else" with 14%)	43%
University of North Florida	October 23 – November 4, 2023	788 (LV)	± 3.8%	22%	9%	9%	6%	2%	3%	1%	1%	1%	6% (Note: "Someone else" with 6%)	40%

=== Results ===
Primary results by county: Donalds: 20–30%; 30–40%; 40–50%; 50–60%; 60–70%; Collins: 20–30%; 30–40%; 40–50%

Republican primary results
Party	Candidate	Votes	%
Republican	Byron Donalds	810,552	47.8
Republican	Jay Collins	426,696	25.2
Republican	James Fishback	177,660	10.5
Republican	Paul Renner	144,950	8.5
Republican	Bobby Williams	69,026	4.1
Republican	Rachel Rodriguez	27,602	1.6
Republican	Jim Holcomb	13,172	0.8
Republican	James Walker Shaw	7,878	0.5
Republican	Arthur Joseph McCaffrey	7,039	0.4
Republican	Caneste Succe	6,266	0.4
Republican	Daniel Nokovich	5,188	0.3
Total votes		1,696,029	100.0

=== Lieutenant gubernatorial nomination ===
==== Nominee ====
- Bryan Avila, member of the Florida Senate (2022–2026)

==== Considered, but not selected ====
- Kat Cammack, U.S. Representative from FL-03 (2021–present)
- Fiona McFarland, member of the Florida House of Representatives (2020–present)
- Ana Maria Rodriguez, member of the Florida Senate (2020–present)
- Meg Weinberger, member of the Florida House of Representatives (2024–present)

== Democratic primary ==
=== Candidates ===
==== Nominee ====
- David Jolly, former Republican U.S. representative from Florida's 13th congressional district (2014–2017)
  - Running mate: Gwen Graham, former Assistant Secretary of Education (2021–2025), former U.S. representative from Florida's 2nd congressional district (2015–2017), and candidate for governor in 2018

==== Eliminated in primary ====
- Evelyn Castillo-Bach
- Thomas Eloy Fernandez
- Dayna Marie Foster, mathematics teacher
- Dotie Joseph, state representative from the 108th district (2018–present)
- Stephann Norman

==== Withdrawn ====
- Jerry Demings, mayor of Orange County (2018–present) and husband of former U.S. representative Val Demings
- Jessica Vernekar, social media influencer

==== Declined ====
- Nikki Fried, chair of the Florida Democratic Party (2023–present), former Florida Commissioner of Agriculture (2019–2023), and candidate for governor in 2022
- Fentrice Driskell, minority leader of the state House of Representatives (2022–present) (running for state senate)
- Gwen Graham, former Assistant Secretary of Education (2021–2025), former U.S. representative from Florida's 2nd congressional district (2015–2017), and candidate for governor in 2018 (endorsed Jolly, running for lieutenant governor)
- Shevrin Jones, state senator from the 34th district (2020–present)
- Daniella Levine Cava, mayor of Miami-Dade County (2020–present)
- Jared Moskowitz, U.S. representative from Florida's 23rd congressional district (2023–present) (running for re-election)
- Angie Nixon, state representative from the 13th district (2020–present) (running for U.S. Senate)

=== Endorsements ===
David Jolly

Executive branch officials

- Bill Clinton, 42nd president of the United States (1993–2001)
- Eric Holder, former attorney general of the United States (2009–2015) and chair of the National Democratic Redistricting Committee
- Donna Shalala, former secretary of health and human services (1993–2001) and FL-27 (2019–2021)

U.S. representatives

- Allen Boyd, former FL-02 (1997–2011)
- Maxwell Frost, FL-10 (2023–present)
- Gwen Graham, former FL-02 (2015–2017) and 2018 gubernatorial candidate (candidate's running mate)
- Ron Klein, former FL-22 (2007–2011)
- Patrick Murphy, former FL-18 (2013–2017)
- Larry Smith, former FL-16 (1983–1993)
- Karen Thurman, former FL-05 (1993–2003)

Statewide officials

- Betty Castor, former education commissioner of Florida (1987–1994)
- Barbara Pariente, former chief justice (2004–2006) of the Supreme Court of Florida (1997–2019)
- Alex Sink, former chief financial officer of Florida (2007–2011) and nominee for governor in 2010
- Eric Smith, former education commissioner of Florida (2007–2011) (Republican)

State legislators

- Robin Bartleman, HD-103 (2020–present)
- Lori Berman, minority leader of the Florida Senate (2025–present) from SD-31 (2018–present)
- Mack Bernard, SD-24 (2024–present)
- Kevin Chambliss, HD-117 (2020–present)
- Dan Daley, HD-96 (2019–present)
- Tracie Davis, SD-05 (2022–present)
- Michael Gottlieb, HD-102 (2018–present)
- Emily Gregory, HD-87 (2026–present)
- Shevrin Jones, SD-34 (2020–present)
- Rob Long, HD-90 (2025–present)
- Brian Nathan, SD-14 (2026–present)
- Tina Polsky, SD-30 (2020–present)
- Mitch Rosenwald, HD-98 (2024–present)
- Kelly Skidmore, HD-89 (2024–present)
- Debra Tendrich, HD-92 (2020–present)
- 44 former state legislators (Note: Mike Abrams, HD-105 (1983–1994); Dave Aronberg, SD-27 (2002–2010); Dick Batchelor, HD-43 (1974–1982); Annie Betancourt, HD-116 (1994–2002); Elaine Bloom, HD-106 (1974–1978, 1986–1995); Scott Clemons, HD-6 (1990–1998); Ben Diamond, HD-68 (2016–2022); Katie Edwards-Walpole, HD-98 (2012–2018); Steven Effman, HD-98 (1996–2000); Luis Garcia, HD-107 (2006–2012); Winston Gardner Jr., SD-17 (1988–1992); Dan Gelber, SD-25 (2008–2010) and former mayor of Miami Beach (2017–2023); Joseph Gibbons, HD-100 (2006–2014); Daryl Jones, SD-40 (1992–2002) and 2002 gubernatorial candidate; Tom Keen, HD-35 (2024); Rick Kriseman, HD-53 (2006–2012) and former mayor of St. Petersburg (2014–2022); Mike Langton, HD-15 (1986–1992); Cindy Lerner, HD-119 (2000–2002); Fred Lippman, HD-100 (1978–1999); Janet Long, HD-51 (2006–2010); Anne Mackenzie, HD-95 (1982–1998); Robert McKnight, SD-38 (1978–1982); Les Miller, former Florida Senate Minority Leader (2004–2006) from the 18th district (2000–2006); Jon Mills, former Speaker of the Florida House of Representatives (1987–1988) from the 24th district (1978–1988); Steve Perman, HD-78 (2010–2012); Frank Peterman, HD-55 (2000–2008); Ricardo Rangel, HD-43 (2012–2014); Alzo Reddick, HD-39 (1982–2000); Robert Reynolds, HD-109 (1978–1984); Tom Rossin, former minority leader of the Florida Senate (2000–2002) from SD-35 (1994–2002); Tim Ryan, HD-100 (1998–2006) and former Broward County Commissioner from the 7th district (2012–2024); Elaine Schwartz, HD-99 (2006–2014); Ron Silver, SD-38 (1992–2002); Rod Smith, SD-14 (2000–2006) and 2006 gubernatorial candidate; Eleanor Sobel, SD-36 (2012–2016); Richard Stark, HD-104 (2012–2020); George Stuart, SD-14 (1978–1990) and 1990 gubernatorial candidate; Marjorie Turnbull, HD-09 (1994–2000); Peter Weinstein, former majority leader of the Florida Senate (1990–1992) from SD-29 (1983–1996); Matt Willhite, HD-86 (2016–2022); Carl Zimmermann, HD-65 (2012–2014); Nancy Argenziano, SD-03 (2002–2007) (Reform; elected as a Republican); Paula Dockery, SD-15 (2002–2012) and 2010 Republican gubernatorial candidate (elected as a Republican); Juan-Carlos Planas, HD-14 (2002–2010) (elected as a Republican))

Local officials

- Dave Aronberg, former State attorney for the Fifteenth Judicial Circuit Court of Florida (2013–2025)
- Angelo Castillo, mayor of Pembroke Pines (2024–present)
- Lamar Fisher, Broward County commissioner from the 4th district (2018–present)
- Anne Gannon, Palm Beach County tax collector (2006–present) and former HD-86 (2000–2006)
- Joe Geller, Miami-Dade County Public Schools board member from the 3rd district (2024–present) and former HD-100 (2014–2022)
- Steven Geller, Broward County commissioner from the 5th district (2016–present) and former SD-31 (2003–2009)
- Daniella Levine Cava, mayor of Miami-Dade County (2020–present)
- Amy Mercado, Orange County property appraiser (2021–present) and former HD-48 (2016–2020)
- Nan Rich, Broward County commissioner from the 1st district (2016–present) and former minority leader (2010–2012) from SD-34 (2004–2012)
- Dean Trantalis, mayor of Fort Lauderdale (2018–present)

Labor unions

- Florida AFL-CIO
- Florida Education Association

Organizations

- Dolphin Democrats
- Florida Democratic Party Hispanic Caucus
- Florida Democratic Party LGBTQ+ Caucus

Newspapers

- Miami Herald
- Orlando Sentinel
Dayna Marie Foster

Organizations

- Orlando 50501
- Democratic Progressive Caucus of Florida
Jerry Demings (withdrawn)

U.S. representatives

- Val Demings, former FL-10 (2017–2023) (candidate's spouse)
- Al Lawson, former FL-05 (2017–2023)
- Kendrick Meek, former FL-17 (2003–2011)
- Darren Soto, FL-09 (2017–present)

Statewide officials

- Bob Butterworth, former attorney general of Florida (1987–2002)

State legislators

- Kristen Arrington, SD-25 (2024–present)
- LaVon Bracy Davis, SD-15 (2025–present)
- Rita Harris, HD-44 (2022–present)
- Dianne Hart, HD-63 (2018–present)
- Yvonne Hayes Hinson, HD-21 (2020–present)
- Tony Hill, former SD-01 (2002–2011)
- Johanna López, HD-43 (2022–present)
- Ed Narain, former HD-61 (2014–2016)
- Michele Rayner, HD-62 (2020–present)
- Darryl Rouson, SD-16 (2016–present)
- Gary Siplin, former SD-19 (2002–2012)
- Leonard Spencer, HD-45 (2024–present)
- Vic Torres, SD-25 (2016–2024)
- RaShon Young, HD-40 (2025–present)

Local officials

- Buddy Dyer, mayor of Orlando (2003–present) and former Florida Senate Minority Leader (1998–2000) from the 14th district (1992–2002)
- John Mina, sheriff of Orange County (2018–present)
- Belvin Perry, former chief judge of the 9th juidicial circuit (1989–2014)
- Bobby Powell, Palm Beach County commissioner from the 7th district (2024–present)

Organizations

- National Baptist Convention, USA
- Omega Psi Phi PAC

=== Polling ===
Poll source	Date(s) administered	Sample size	Margin of error	Jerry Demings	Dayna Marie Foster	David Jolly	Other	Undecided
Targoz Market Research	July 20–26, 2026	341 (LV)	—	—	4%	47%	4% (Note: Thomas Fernandez with 4%; Evelyn Castillo-Bach with 3%)	42%
Targoz Market Research	July 20–26, 2026	389 (RV)	—	—	5%	42%	4% (Note: Thomas Fernandez with 4%; Evelyn Castillo-Bach with 3%)	46%
Change Research (D)	July 9–11, 2026	— (LV)	—	—	11%	42%	8% (Note: Dotie Joseph at 6%; "Would not vote" at 2%)	40%
	June 5, 2026	Demings withdraws from the race						
Change Research (D)	May 13–16, 2026	— (LV)	—	27%	—	42%	—	31%
Emerson College	March 29–31, 2026	362 (LV)	± 4.4%	10%	2%	21%	16% (Note: Evelyn Castillo-Bach with 3%; Kevin Cichowski, Thomas Fernandez, Kenneth Norman, Donald Peterson, and Jessica Vernekar with 2%; Faith Antonio, Richard Dembinsky, Charles Lewis, and Bill Slater with 1%)	53%
Targoz Market Research	February 20–22, 2026	471 (RV)	± 4.4%	23%	—	31%	2% (Note: "I would not vote" with 2%)	44%
Mason-Dixon Polling & Strategy	January 8–13, 2026	400 (RV)	± 5.0%	19%	—	23%	—	58%
Public Policy Polling (D) (Note: Poll sponsored by Moving Florida Forward, which supports Demings.)	December 2–3, 2025	616 (LV)	—	22%	—	22%	—	56%

Hypothetical polling

Poll source	Date(s) administered	Sample size	Margin of error	Jason Pizzo	Daniella Levine Cava	Gwen Graham	David Jolly	Lauren Book	Angie Nixon	Shevrin Jones	Fentrice Driskell	Undecided
Targoz Market Research	May 5–7, 2025	396 (RV)	—	—	32%	13%	10%	7%	6%	4%	7%	21%
Targoz Market Research	April 15–22, 2025	464 (RV)	—	41%	15%	5%	7%	4%	4%	2%	1%	21%

=== Results ===
County results Jolly: 40–50%; 50–60%; 60–70%; 70–80%

Congressional district results Jolly: 40–50%; 50–60%; 60–70%; 70–80%

Democratic primary results
Party	Candidate	Votes	%
Democratic	David Jolly	761,558	61.0
Democratic	Dayna Marie Foster	189,205	15.1
Democratic	Dotie Joseph	119,825	9.6
Democratic	Evelyn Castillo-Bach	96,581	7.7
Democratic	Thomas Eloy Fernandez	47,261	3.8
Democratic	Stephann Norman	34,922	2.8
Total votes		1,249,352	100.0

== Independent and third-party candidates ==
=== Independent candidates ===
==== Qualified ====
- Dean Ocean Abrams (Independent)
- Charles Burkett, Mayor of Surfside (2006–2010, 2020–2022, 2024–2026) (Independent)
- Jeffery Peter "Dr. Jeff" Datto (Independent)
- Moliere Dimanche (Independent), author and withdrawn candidate for mayor of Orlando in 2023
- Frank J. Russo (Independent)

==== Write-in ====
- Kathy Anderson (Write-in)
- Richard Paul Dembinsky (Write-in)
- Mohammad Wajid Khan (Write-in)
- Erik Morris (Write-in)

==== Withdrew ====
- Desmond Meade, voting rights activist

==== Declined ====
- John Morgan, attorney and billionaire (endorsed Donalds)
- Jason Pizzo, former Democratic minority leader of the Florida Senate (2024–2025) from the 37th district (2018–present)

=== Libertarian Party ===
==== Qualified ====
- Scott Jewett (Libertarian), entrepreneur

== General election ==
=== Predictions ===
Source	Ranking	As of
The Cook Political Report	Lean R	October 29, 2026
Decision Desk HQ	Lean R	November 3, 2026
Fox News	Lean R	November 1, 2026
Inside Elections	Lean R	October 29, 2026
NBC News	Lean R	November 3, 2026
RealClearPolitics	Tossup	November 1, 2026
Sabato's Crystal Ball	Lean R	November 2, 2026
Silver Bulletin	Likely R	November 3, 2026

=== Post-primary endorsements ===
Byron Donalds (R)

Statewide officials

- Ron DeSantis, governor of Florida (2019–present)
- Jay Collins, lieutenant governor of Florida (2025–present) and former gubernatorial candidate
- Carlos Lopez-Cantera, former lieutenant governor of Florida (2014–2019)

State legislators

- Paul Renner, former speaker of the Florida House of Representatives (2022–2024) from HD-19 (2015–2024) and former gubernatorial candidate

Local officials

- Cynthia Chestnut, Gainesville city commissioner (1987–1989, 2022–present) (Democratic)
- Francis Suarez, former mayor of Miami (2017–2025)

Organizations

- Florida Police Benevolent Association
- Florida State Lodge Fraternal Order of Police
- NRA Political Victory Fund (NRA-PVF)

Newspapers

- Washington Reporter
David Jolly (D)

Executive branch officials

- Bill Clinton, former president of the United States (1993–2001)
- Barack Obama, former president of the United States (2009–2017)
- Eric Holder, former attorney general of the United States (2009–2015) and chair of the National Democratic Redistricting Committee

U.S. representatives

- Hakeem Jeffries, House minority leader (2023–present) from NY-08 (2013–present)

Party officials

- Nikki Fried, chair of the Florida Democratic Party (2023–present)

State legislators

- Angie Nixon, HD-13 and 2026 Democratic nominee for U.S Senate
- LaVon Bracy Davis, SD-15 (2025–present) (endorsed Demings in the primary)
- Arthenia Joyner, SD-19 (2006–2016)
- Sean Shaw, HD-61 (2016–2018)
- Marie Woodson, HD-105 (2020–present)

Local officials

- Alvin Brown, former mayor of Jacksonville (2011–2015)

Individuals

- Bobby Williams, activist and former gubernatorial candidate (Republican)

Labor unions

- American Federation of Government Employees
- AFSCME Florida
- International Association of Machinists and Aerospace Workers
- United Auto Workers

Organizations

- Sierra Club Florida

Newspapers

- Miami Herald

Political parties

- Forward Party
Declined to endorse

Individuals

- James Fishback, investor and former candidate for this seat (Republican)

=== Fundraising ===
Campaign finance reports as of September 30, 2026
Candidate	Raised	Spent
Byron Donalds (R)	$142,859,883	$110,747,693
David Jolly (D)	$11,560,145	$8,310,296
Scott Jewett (L)	$8,535	$9,818
Source: Transparency USA

=== Polling ===
Aggregate polls

Source of poll aggregation	Dates administered	Dates updated	Byron Donalds (R)	David Jolly (D)	Other/ Undecided (Note: Calculated by taking the difference of 100% and all other candidates combined.)	Margin
270toWin	October 12–29, 2026	October 31, 2026	48.8%	44.3%	6.9%	Donalds +4.5%
Decision Desk HQ	through October 27, 2026	October 31, 2026	48.0%	44.2%	7.8%	Donalds +3.2%
FiftyPlusOne	through October 30, 2026	October 31, 2026	48.7%	44.3%	7.0%	Donalds +4.4%
RealClearPolitics	October 2–30, 2026	October 31, 2026	48.6%	44.0%	7.4%	Donalds +4.6%
Silver Bulletin	through October 30, 2026	October 31, 2026	48.4%	44.3%	7.3%	Donalds +4.1%
Average			48.5%	44.2%	7.2%	Donalds +4.3%

Poll source	Date(s) administered	Sample size	Margin of error	Byron Donalds (R)	David Jolly (D)	Other	Undecided
Research Co.	October 31 – November 2, 2026	450 (LV)	± 4.6%	48%	44%	2% (Note: "Some other candidate" with 2%)	6%
RedBox Research (D)	October 30–31, 2026	2,898 (LV)	± 2.1%	47%	46%	5%	1%
ActiVote	October 20–31, 2026	400 (LV)	± 4.9%	52%	48%	—	—
Big Data Poll	October 26–30, 2026	1,067 (LV)	± 3.0%	47% (Note: With undecideds pushed)	44%	9% (Note: Scott Jewett (L) with 3%; Moliere Dimanche (I) & Frank Russo (I) with 2%; Dean Abrams (I) & Jeffrey Datto (I) with 1%)	—
Big Data Poll	October 26–30, 2026	1,067 (LV)	± 3.0%	44%	41%	6% (Note: Scott Jewett (L) & Frank Russo (I) with 2%; Moliere Dimanche (I) & Jeffrey Datto (I) with 1%; Dean Abrams (I) with 0%)	8%
Big Data Poll	October 26–30, 2026	1,122 (RV)	± 3.0%	47%	44%	10% (Note: Scott Jewett (L) & Frank Russo (I) with 3%; Moliere Dimanche (I) with 2%; Dean Abrams (I) & Jeffrey Datto (I) with 1%)	—
Big Data Poll	October 26–30, 2026	1,122 (RV)	± 3.0%	43%	40%	6% (Note: Scott Jewett (L) & Frank Russo (I) with 2%; Moliere Dimanche (I) & Jeffrey Datto (I) with 1%; Dean Abrams (I) with 0%)	11%
Stetson University	October 26–30, 2026	852 (RV)	± 3.6%	51%	45%	1%	2%
InsiderAdvantage (R)	October 28–29, 2026	1,200 (LV)	± 2.8%	49%	45%	2%	4%
Targoz Market Research	October 26–29, 2026	1,014 (LV)	± 3.0%	50%	43%	3%	4%
Political Matrix/The Listener Group	October 26–28, 2026	500 (LV)	± 4.4%	40%	39%	—	21%
St. Pete Polls	October 25–27, 2026	916 (LV)	± 3.2%	48%	46%	3% (Note: "Someone else" with 3%)	3%
New York Times/Siena University	October 19–25, 2026	813 (LV)	± 3.9%	48%	44%	0%	7%
RedBox Research	October 20–23, 2026	4,832 (LV)	± 2.5%	49%	44%	3%	4%
Echelon Insights (R) (Note: Poll conducted for NetChoice)	October 16–23, 2026	515 (LV)	± 5.0%	50%	44%	1% (Note: Scott Jewett (L) with 1%)	5%
Workbench Strategy (D)	October 18–22, 2026	800 (LV)	± 3.5%	46%	48%	—	—
co/efficient (R)	October 18–20, 2026	1,014 (LV)	± 3.1%	49%	40%	—	11%
University of North Florida	October 12–19, 2026	1,471 (LV)	± 2.8%	49%	47%	—	4%
ActiVote	October 1–19, 2026	400 (LV)	± 4.9%	52%	48%	—	—
Univision/YouGov	October 2–15, 2026	825 (RV)	± 4.0%	50%	42%	—	8%
Fabrizio, Lee & Associates (R)	October 8–11, 2026	1,200 (LV)	—	49%	43%	—	8%
Change Research (D)	October 8–10, 2026	920 (LV)	± 3.1%	47%	47%	1% (Note: "Would not vote" with 1%)	5%
MDW Communications (Note: Poll conducted for EDGE Communications)	October 4–10, 2026	2,351 (LV)	± 2.8%	46%	44%	—	10%
Stetson University	October 1–9, 2026	716 (LV)	± 4.2%	52%	41%	3% (Note: "Another candidate" with 3%)	5%
St. Pete Polls	October 5–7, 2026	836 (LV)	± 3.4%	45%	45%	4% (Note: "Someone else" with 4%)	7%
YouGov	September 28 – October 5, 2026	3,813 (LV)	± 2.7%	47%	45%	1%	7%
Targoz Market Research	September 28 – October 4, 2026	849 (LV)	—	52%	42%	3% (Note: "Another candidate" with 3%)	3%
Targoz Market Research	September 28 – October 4, 2026	1,174 (RV)	± 2.8%	48%	39%	5% (Note: "Another candidate" with 5%)	8%
Mason-Dixon	September 28 – October 1, 2026	625 (LV)	± 4.0%	48%	41%	1%	10%
Change Research (D)	September 25–27, 2026	1,063 (LV)	± 2.8%	46%	48%	1%	5%
Stetson University	September 14–21, 2026	830 (LV)	± 4.3%	51%	39%	5%	5%
St. Pete Polls	September 15–17, 2026	913 (LV)	± 3.2%	44%	43%	4% (Note: "Someone else" with 4%)	9%
Change Research (D)	September 7–9, 2026	1,107 (LV)	± 2.8%	44%	47%	1%	7%
	August 18, 2026	Primary elections					
Hart Research Associates (D) (Note: Poll sponsored by the Democratic Governors Association)	August 10–13, 2026	600 (LV)	± 4.0%	45%	46%	—	9%
Targoz Market Research	July 20–26, 2026	1,026 (LV)	—	45%	38%	—	17%
Targoz Market Research	July 20–26, 2026	1,338 (RV)	± 2.62%	40%	36%	—	24%
University of North Florida	July 8–17, 2026	848 (LV)	± 3.8%	46%	41%	7% (Note: "Someone else" with 5%; "Wouldn't vote" with 2%)	6%
Change Research (D)	July 9–11, 2026	1,348 (RV)	± 2.8%	37%	37%	11% (Note: "Would not Vote" with 6%; Desmond Meade (I) with 5%)	16%
Change Research (D)	July 9–11, 2026	1,348 (RV)	± 2.8%	40%	41%	7% (Note: "Would not Vote" with 7%)	12%
Change Research (D)	May 13–16, 2026	1,593 (LV)	± 2.3%	42%	46%	4% (Note: "Would not vote" with 4%)	8%
Change Research (D)	May 13–16, 2026	2,070 (RV)	± 2.3%	43%	41%	6% (Note: "Would not vote" with 6%)	10%
Cherry Communications (R) (Note: Poll sponsored by the Florida Chamber of Commerce)	May 1–9, 2026	604 (LV)	± 4.0%	47%	39%	—	14%
Stetson University	March 15 – April 13, 2026	848 (LV)	± 4.1%	47%	40%	—	7%
Echelon Insights (Note: Poll commissioned by NetChoice)	April 3–9, 2026	406 (LV)	± 6.0%	49%	43%	—	8%
MDW Communications (D) (Note: Poll sponsored by Edge Communications)	March 27 – April 3, 2026	1,834 (LV)	± 2.0%	41%	41%	—	18%
Emerson College	March 29–31, 2026	1,165 (LV)	± 2.8%	44%	39%	2% (Note: "Someone else" with 2%)	17%
University of North Florida	February 21 – March 2, 2026	786 (LV)	± 4.0%	42%	36%	5%	17%
Targoz Market Research	February 13–16, 2026	1,129 (LV)	± 2.8%	41%	36%	6% (Note: Jason Pizzo (I) with 6%)	12%
University of North Florida	October 15–25, 2025	728 (LV)	± 4.3%	45%	34%	3% (Note: "Someone else", "Wouldn't vote", and "Refusal" with 1%)	18%
Targoz Market Research	September 16–18, 2025	1,118 (RV)	± 2.8%	36%	32%	4% (Note: Jason Pizzo (I) with 4%)	28%
Bendixen & Amandi International (D) (Note: Poll sponsored by Jolly's campaign)	September 7–9, 2025	631 (LV)	± 4.0%	40%	41%	—	19%
AIF Center (R)	August 25–27, 2025	800 (LV)	± 3.5%	49%	41%	—	11%
Victory Insights (R)	June 7–10, 2025	600 (LV)	± 2.8%	37%	31%	—	32%

Hypothetical polling

Jay Collins vs. David Jolly

Poll source	Date(s) administered	Sample size	Margin of error	Jay Collins (R)	David Jolly (D)	Other	Undecided
Targoz Market Research	July 20–26, 2026	1,027 (LV)	—	44%	39%	—	17%
Targoz Market Research	July 20–26, 2026	1,332 (RV)	± 2.62%	40%	37%	—	23%

James Fishback vs. David Jolly

Poll source	Date(s) administered	Sample size	Margin of error	James Fishback (R)	David Jolly (D)	Undecided
Keystone Analytics	March 27 – April 6, 2026	795 (LV)	± 3.5%	44%	40%	16%

Paul Renner vs. David Jolly

Poll source	Date(s) administered	Sample size	Margin of error	Paul Renner (R)	David Jolly (D)	Other	Undecided
Targoz Market Research	September 16–18, 2025	1,123 (RV)	± 2.8%	34%	33%	5% (Note: Jason Pizzo (I) with 5%)	28%
Bendixen & Amandi International (D)	September 7–9, 2025	631 (LV)	± 4.0%	42%	40%	—	18%

Byron Donalds vs. Jerry Demings

Poll source	Date(s) administered	Sample size	Margin of error	Byron Donalds (R)	Jerry Demings (D)	Other	Undecided
Change Research (D)	May 13–16, 2026	1,593 (LV)	± 2.3%	42%	46%	4%	8%
Change Research (D)	May 13–16, 2026	2,070 (RV)	± 2.3%	43%	40%	6% (Note: "Would not vote" with 5%)	12%
Cherry Communications (R)	May 1–9, 2026	604 (LV)	± 4.0%	48%	39%	—	13%
Stetson University	March 15 – April 13, 2026	848 (LV)	± 4.1%	46%	42%	—	7%
Echelon Insights	April 3–9, 2026	406 (LV)	± 6.0%	48%	44%	—	8%
Emerson College	March 29–31, 2026	1,165 (LV)	± 2.8%	45%	36%	2%	19%
University of North Florida	February 21 – March 2, 2026	786 (LV)	± 4.0%	43%	36%	5%	16%
University of North Florida	October 15–25, 2025	728 (LV)	± 4.3%	45%	33%	5% (Note: "Someone else" and "Wouldn't vote" with 2%; "Refusal" with 1%)	17%

Byron Donalds vs. Daniella Levine Cava vs. Jason Pizzo

Poll source	Date(s) administered	Sample size	Margin of error	Byron Donalds (R)	Daniella Levine Cava (D)	Jason Pizzo (I)	Undecided
Targoz Market Research	May 5–7, 2025	1,200 (RV)	± 2.8%	38%	34%	5%	23%

Casey DeSantis vs. David Jolly

Poll source	Date(s) administered	Sample size	Margin of error	Casey DeSantis (R)	David Jolly (D)	Other	Undecided
Emerson College	March 29–31, 2026	1,165 (LV)	± 2.8%	39%	40%	3%	19%
University of North Florida	October 15–25, 2025	728 (LV)	± 4.3%	47%	34%	5%	14%

Casey DeSantis vs. Jerry Demings

Poll source	Date(s) administered	Sample size	Margin of error	Casey DeSantis (R)	Jerry Demings (D)	Other	Undecided
Emerson College	March 29–31, 2026	1,165 (LV)	± 2.8%	41%	39%	3%	17%
University of North Florida	October 15–25, 2025	728 (LV)	± 4.3%	47%	36%	6% (Note: "Someone else", "Wouldn't vote", and "Refusal" with 2%)	11%

Casey DeSantis vs. Daniella Levine Cava vs. Jason Pizzo

Poll source	Date(s) administered	Sample size	Margin of error	Casey DeSantis (R)	Daniella Levine Cava (D)	Jason Pizzo (I)	Undecided
Targoz Market Research	May 5–7, 2025	1,200 (RV)	± 2.8%	39%	35%	8%	18%

Generic Republican vs. generic Democrat

Poll source	Date(s) administered	Sample size	Margin of error	Generic Republican	Generic Democrat	Undecided
Cygnal (R) (Note: Poll sponsored by Conservatives for Clean Energy)	August 25–27, 2025	1,000 (LV)	± 3.1%	51%	38%	11%
Cygnal (R)	October 26–28, 2024	600 (LV)	± 4.0%	48%	41%	11%

== Results ==
2026 Florida gubernatorial election
Party	Candidate	Votes	%	±%
Republican	Byron Donalds Bryan Avila	4,135,955	50.00	−9.36%
Democratic	David Jolly Gwen Graham	4,030,579	48.73	+8.75%
Libertarian	Scott Eckhard Jewett Nicole Skelly	37,951	0.46	+0.21%
Independent	Frank J. Russo Rachel Rodriguez	23,244	0.28	N/A
Independent	Charles Burkett Ruben A. Coto	15,261	0.19	N/A
Independent	Dean Ocean Abrams Joe Van Vactor	12,568	0.15	N/A
Independent	Jeffrey Peter "Dr. Jeff" Datto Juan Santana	8,331	0.10	N/A
Independent	Moliere Dimanche Benjiman Rojas	7,609	0.09	N/A
Write-in		129	0.00	N/A
Total votes		8,271,627	100.0	N/A
Republican hold				

=== Counties that flipped from Republican to Democratic ===
- Duval (largest municipality: Jacksonville)
- Hillsborough (largest municipality: Tampa)
- Miami-Dade (largest municipality: Miami)
- Osceola (largest municipality: Kissimmee)
- Palm Beach (largest municipality: West Palm Beach)
- Pinellas (largest municipality: St. Petersburg)
- Seminole (largest municipality: Sanford)
- St. Lucie (largest municipality: Port St. Lucie)

==== By congressional district ====
Donalds won 19 congressional districts, including one that elected a Democrat, while Jolly won nine congressional districts, including two that elected Republicans.

District	Donalds	Jolly	Elected Representative
1st	63.34%	35.12%	Jimmy Patronis
2nd	52.39%	46.42%	Austin Rogers
3rd	54.71%	43.87%	Kat Cammack
4th	49.32%	49.20%	Aaron Bean
5th	55.11%	43.45%	John Rutherford
6th	60.07%	38.51%	Randy Fine
7th	49.58%	48.97%	Ryan Elijah
8th	51.92%	46.63%	Mike Haridopolos
9th	50.94%	47.63%	Darren Soto
10th	29.37%	69.25%	Maxwell Frost
11th	53.46%	45.33%	Joe Strada
12th	50.56%	47.87%	Gus Bilirakis
13th	50.71%	47.66%	Anna Paulina Luna
14th	47.17%	51.14%	Kathy Castor
15th	52.93%	45.52%	Laurel Lee
16th	52.06%	46.66%	Sydney Gruters
17th	58.15%	40.62%	Greg Steube
18th	49.82%	48.58%	Scott Franklin
19th	61.75%	37.33%	Jim Schwartzel
20th	23.18%	75.61%	Debbie Wasserman Schultz
21st	52.67%	46.17%	Brian Mast
22nd	48.36%	50.47%	Pia Dandiya
23rd	35.59%	63.10%	Lois Frankel
24th	20.73%	77.92%	Oliver Gilbert III
25th	48.15%	49.63%	Jared Moskowitz
26th	48.27%	50.45%	Mario Díaz-Balart
27th	49.35%	49.39%	Maria Elvira Salazar
28th	52.29%	46.41%	Carlos A. Giménez

== Analysis ==
=== Exit poll ===
2026 Florida gubernatorial election (CNN)
Demographic subgroup	Donalds	Jolly	% of total vote
Ideology
Conservatives	90	9	38
Moderates	35	64	41
Liberals	6	94	21
Party
Republicans	92	7	41
Democrats	2	98	30
Independents	39	58	29
Donald Trump job approval
Approve	97	3	44
Disapprove	13	85	55
2024 presidential vote
Donald Trump	93	6	51
Kamala Harris	2	98	42
Another candidate	37	48	2
Did not vote	24	72	5
Gender
Men	53	46	46
Women	47	51	54
Income
$100,000 or more	53	46	40
$50,000-$99,999	48	51	32
Less than $50,000	48	50	28
Race/ethnicity
White	58	41	67
Latino	44	55	18
Black	13	86	10
White born-again or evangelical Christian?
Yes	84	15	17
No	43	56	83
Latino descent?
Cuban	58	42	5
Puerto Rican	30	68	4
Other Latino descent	40	59	7
Not of Latino descent	51	48	83
Race by gender
White men	59	40	31
White women	58	41	36
Black men	25	75	4
Black women	6	94	6
Latino men	47	51	8
Latina women	41	58	9
All other voters	36	61	6
Age
18–29 years old	24	75	8
30–44 years old	37	61	16
45–64 years old	55	44	34
65 and older	57	43	41
Area type
Urban	45	54	21
Suburban	48	51	57
Rural	62	37	22
Education
College graduate	45	54	46
No college degree	54	44	54
Education by race
White college graduates	50	49	31
Non-white college graduates	33	66	15
Whites without college	67	32	36
Non-whites without college	33	66	18
Education by gender and race
White women with college degrees	48	51	17
White women without college degrees	65	33	19
White men with college degrees	51	48	15
White men without college degrees	66	33	16
Voters of color	33	66	33
Educational attainment
Advanced degree	43	56	19
Bachelor's degree	46	53	27
Associate's degree	51	48	13
Some college	53	46	18
Never attended college	58	41	23

== See also ==
- List of governors of Florida
- 2026 United States gubernatorial elections

== Notes ==
Partisan clients
