= Anthony Bonna =

American politician

Member of the Florida House of Representatives from the 85th district
- Incumbent
- Assumed office November 3, 2026
- Preceded by: Toby Overdorf

Personal details
- Born: 1989 (age 36–37)
- Party: Republican
- Website: Campaign website

Anthony Bonna (born 1989) (Note: Source states that he was 37 in February 2026.) is an American politician. A member of the Republican Party, he has served in the Florida House of Representatives since 2026, representing the 85th district. He was elected at the 2026 election succeeding fellow Republican Toby Overdorf. He was previously a member of Port St. Lucie City Council.
