= Cary Pigman =

American politician

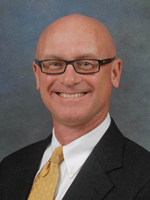

Member of the Florida House of Representatives from the 55th district
- In office November 6, 2012 – November 3, 2020
- Preceded by: Redistricted
- Succeeded by: Kaylee Tuck

Personal details
- Born: November 1, 1958 (age 67) Mt. Vernon, Ohio
- Party: Republican
- Spouse: Libby Pigman
- Children: Joseph, Robert, Cara, Alexander, Lillian
- Education: Xavier University (B.S.); Ohio State University College of Medicine (M.D.)
- Profession: Emergency medicine physician

Cary Pigman (born November 1, 1958) is a Republican politician from Florida. he was a Republican member of the Florida House of Representatives from 2012 to 2020, representing the 55th District, includes Glades, Highlands, Okeechobee, and western St. Lucie County.

== Personal life ==
=== Military service ===
Cary Pigman is a doctor in the U.S. Army Reserve. On May 10, 2013, Pigman reported for active duty as an emergency medicine physician, part of Operation New Dawn in Kuwait.

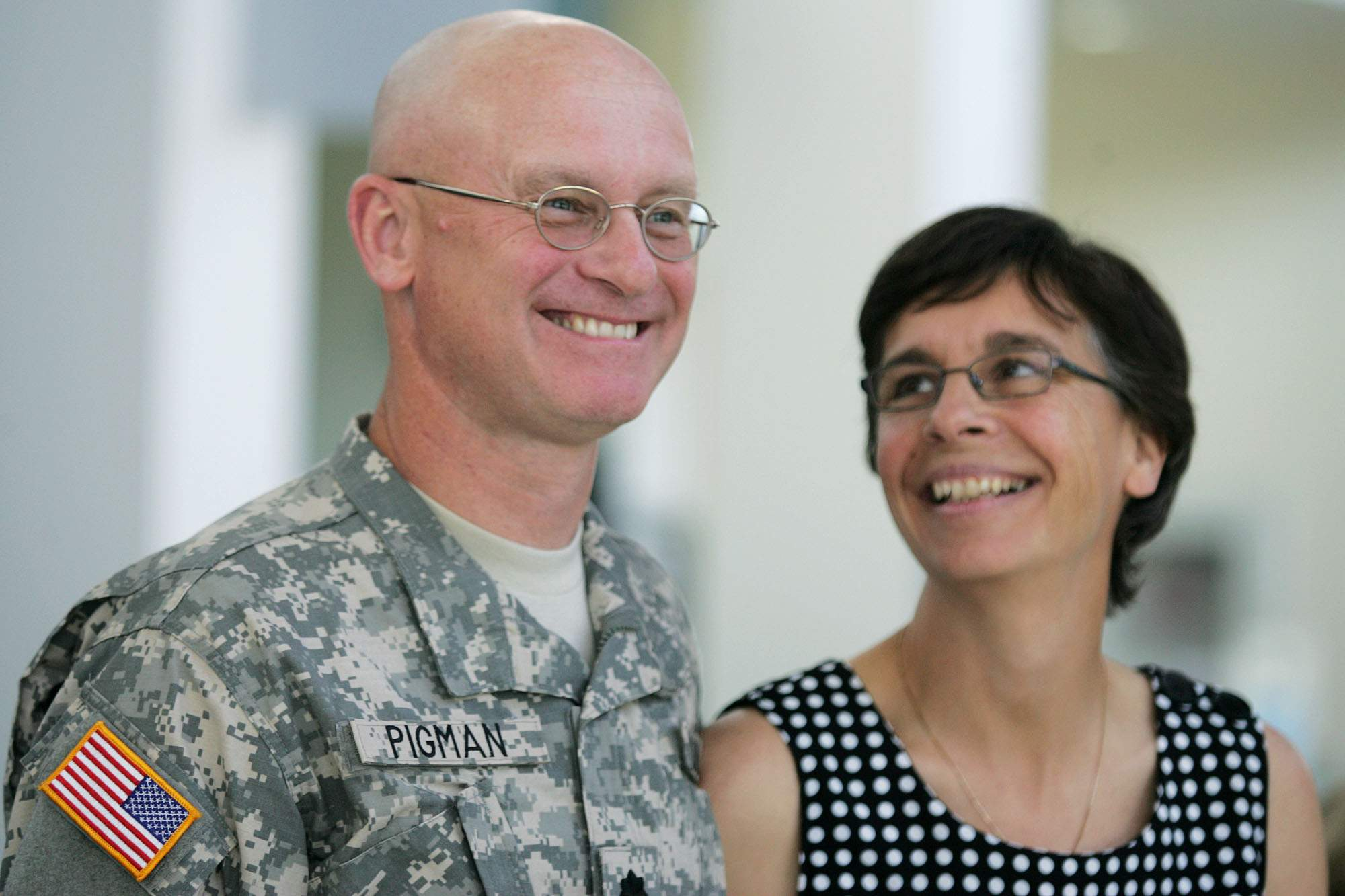
Pigman and his wife, Darlene Pigman

=== Professional career ===
Cary Pigman is an emergency-medicine physician at Florida Hospital Heartland.

=== Criminal History ===
Cary Pigman was arrested in March 2017, and in April plead no contest to the chare of driving under the influence and was sentenced to a year's probation.

== Political career ==
=== 2012 elections ===
In 2012, following redistricting, Cary Pigman ran against former State Representative Randy Johnson in the Florida House District 55 Republican Primary Election. Pigman defeated Johnson by 26 votes. Cary Pigman ran against Democratic nominee Crystal Drake and won the general election.

=== Subsequent elections and legislative career ===
After Pigman's DUI arrest in March 2017, he resigned as Chairman of the House Health Quality Subcommittee.

Pigman was term-limited from the House in 2020, after serving four terms.

=== State Commission On Ethics Investigation ===
In September 2016, the state Commission on Ethics found probable cause that Cary Pigman "misused his position by linking his efforts to obtain legislative funding for the Okeechobee School District to retaliate" against Tracy Downing, principal of South Elementary School in Okeechobee County. The Commission reported that Pigman was having an "extramarital affair" with his district secretary, Elizabeth "Libby" Maxwell, that started on January 15, 2016. Maxwell is married to Devin Maxwell, the brother of Tracy Downing.
