= Moliere Dimanche =

Writer

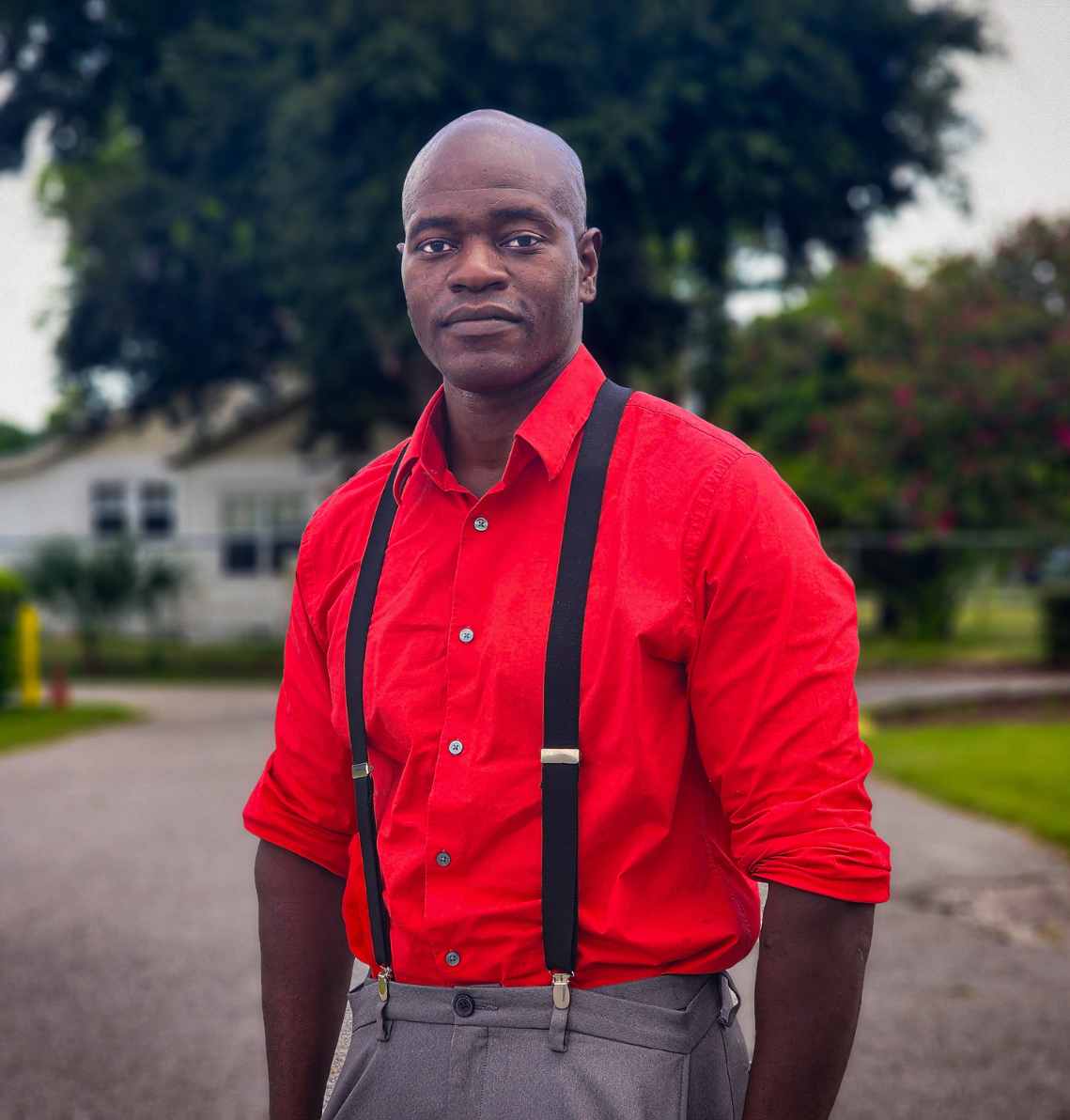

Personal details
- Born: November 7, 1987 (age 39) Orlando, Florida, U.S.
- Party: Independent
- Education: St. Johns River State College (AA)
- Website: Campaign website
- Nickname: Moe

Moliere "Moe" Dimanche (born November 7, 1987) is a Haitian American artist, author, and prison reform activist. His work focuses on social justice, incarceration, and civil rights.

Dimanche grew up in Orlando, Florida. He has written about systemic issues within the U.S. prison system, with works like It Takes a Criminal to Know One: How the Inspector General and I are One and the Same. His art and writings were featured in Marking Time: Art in the Age of Mass Incarceration by Nicole Fleetwood.

Before becoming a voice advocating prison reform, he served time in prison for the theft of construction materials. While incarcerated, he litigated a civil rights case in the United States Court of Appeals for the Eleventh Circuit, Dimanche v. Brown, setting precedent for the future of civil rights cases initiated by incarcerated people under section 1983 of the Ku Klux Klan Act. His art has been featured on The Conversation, and he spoke at the International Center of Photography in Manhattan, New York on the intersection of art and activism.

== Early life and education ==
Dimanche and his brothers faced financial hardship in Orlando. When he was 7, his mother sought refuge for the family at the Orlando Union Rescue Mission while she studied to be a cosmetologist and escape poverty. He later attended West Orange High School in Winter Garden, Florida.

In 2007, at age 19, Dimanche received a 10-year prison sentence for theft, serving 8.5 years and was released. In 2016, he was awarded a Pell Grant scholarship to the Florida School of the Arts at St. Johns River State College in Palatka, where he pursued a degree in studio art. While a student there, he organized pop-up art exhibitions throughout Florida's First Coast.

== Political career ==
=== 2023 Orlando mayoral campaign ===
Dimanche entered local politics as a candidate for mayor of Orlando in the 2023 general election. He also ran for the position of Interim Commissioner after Governor Ron DeSantis suspended Commissioner Regina Hill. While running for Interim Commissioner, Dimanche publicly defended Hill, suggesting the charges against her were politically motivated.

Dimanche did not appear on the ballot in the mayoral race, or the race for interim commissioner after being disqualified over technical issues regarding the payment of qualifying fees.

=== 2026 Florida gubernatorial campaign ===
On August 8, 2025, Dimanche formally announced his candidacy in the 2026 Florida gubernatorial election at the 43rd Annual Pig Roast & Political Mingle hosted by the Northeast Polk Chamber of Commerce in Haines City, Florida. The gubernatorial forum was sponsored by HCA Healthcare and SouthState Bank.

== Civil rights litigation ==
In 2015, Dimanche was involved in Dimanche v. Brown, decided by the United States Court of Appeals for the Eleventh Circuit. The court reversed and remanded a lower court's decision, establishing new precedent under the Prison Litigation Reform Act. The ruling clarified that inmates facing threats or retaliation from staff could bypass the institutional grievance process and appeal directly to an agency's headquarters.

== Incorporating Pine Hills into a municipality ==
After the killing of Dylan Lyons, T'Yonna Major and Nathacha Augustin on February 22, 2023, advocates for public safety in Pine Hills held a town hall expressing their frustration with the lack of law enforcement resources and the failures of the Orange County Sheriff's Office on the day of the triple murder. Dimanche questioned why the sheriff was not present at the town hall to hear the outrage of T'Yonna Major's family, and proposed incorporating Pine Hills into its own municipality in order to secure a law enforcement presence in the area.

Dimanche asserts that public safety was the top priority in Pine Hills, and that the purpose of the push for incorporation was to put an end to crime in the area. According to Jim Clark, a University of Central Florida senior lecturer, it had been more than 60 years since the last discussion of incorporating Pine Hills into a municipality took place.

== No MOE Corruption ==
Dimanche launched his No MOE Corruption campaign as a start to his bid for Governor of the State of Florida. He told Tampa Bay 28 that public corruption was his motivational factor for entering the 2026 Florida gubernatorial election:

"I got into this race to put an end to public corruption. We have great laws here in the State of Florida, but far too often, those we trust to uphold our laws misuse their positions of public trust to benefit themselves and their friends. That results in the People getting the short end of the stick every time."

— Dimanche speaking to Tampa Bay 28

Dimanche has expressed skepticism of Florida governor Ron DeSantis' history of appointing officials as opposed to holding elections, and has criticized instances of those appointees coming under scrutiny for the misappropriation of taxpayer funds. Dimanche has opposed the construction of data centers and has proposed establishing an online portal to track government spending in real time in an effort to deter wasteful spending.

Dimanche supports Florida's push for the elimination of property taxes and has proposed a lottery system to increase home ownership by awarding abandoned properties to the public.

== Advocacy and other ventures ==
Dimanche has produced investigative vlogs on YouTube, alleging abuse in the Florida Department of Corrections. He has traveled across the United States, delivering speeches which connect his artistic work with broader discussions about what he describes as systemic injustice in American prisons.

=== Works ===
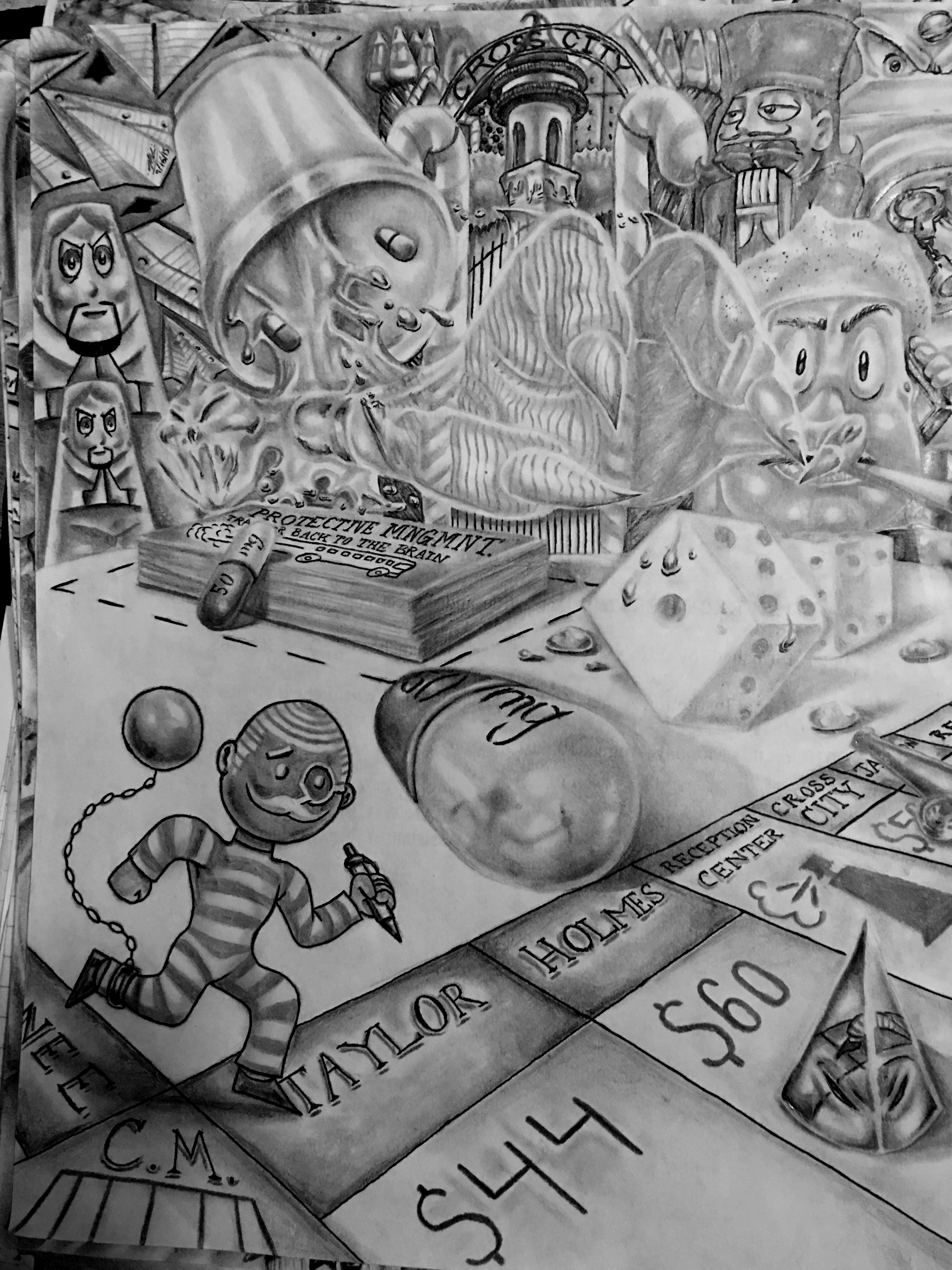
Pills and Potion (2016), pencil drawing

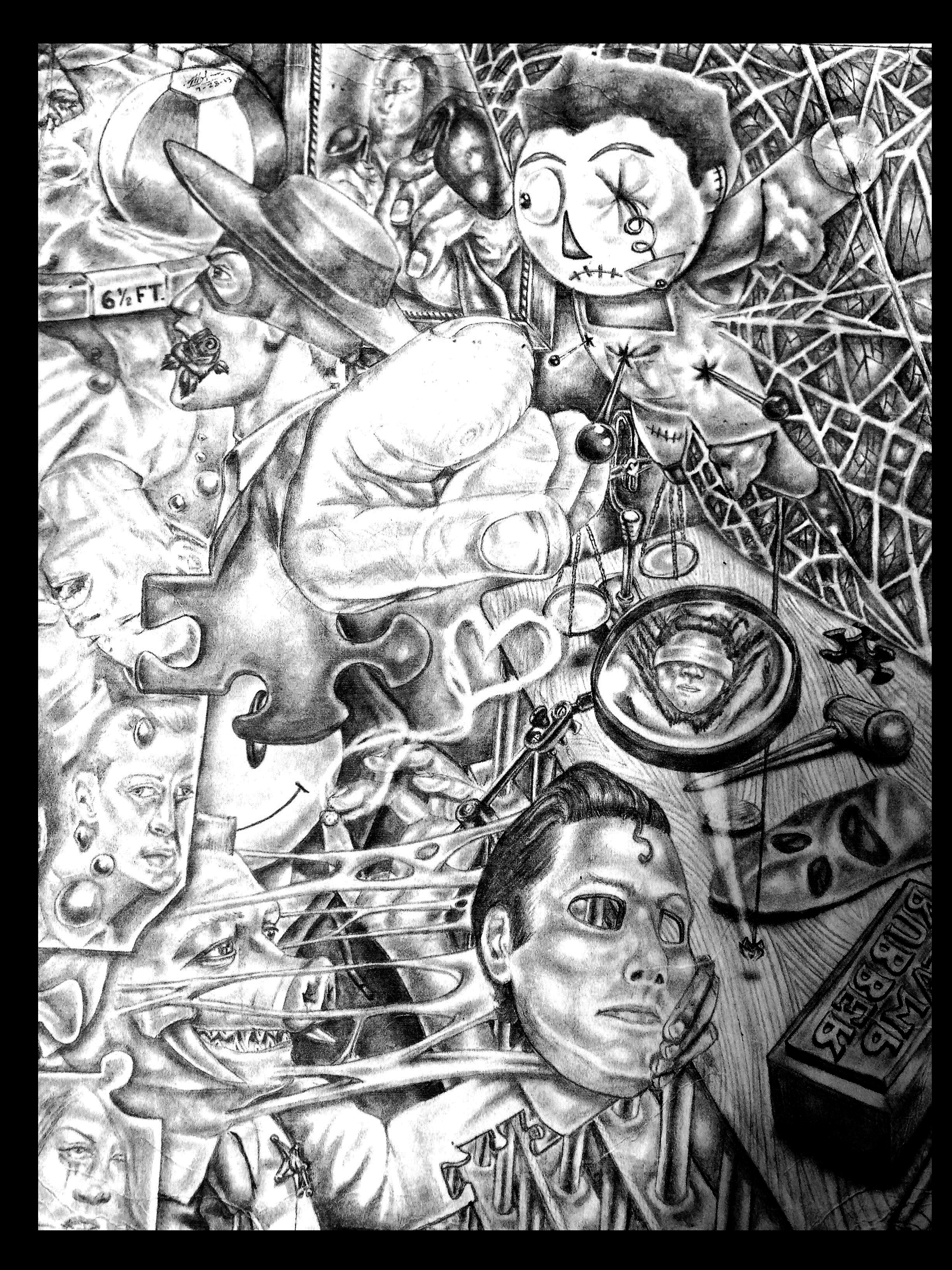
The Verdict (2013), pencil drawing

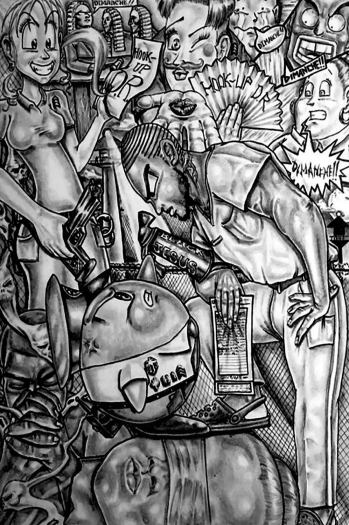
Aspirin (2015), pencil drawing

Dimanche's Redemption series, a portfolio of drawings he made while in prison, earned him a scholarship to the Florida School of the Arts and has been featured in Folio, Salon.com, and The Conversation.

== Books ==
- It Takes a Criminal to Know One: How the Inspector General and I are One and the Same, Amazon (2016)
