= Kevin Steele (politician) =

American politician

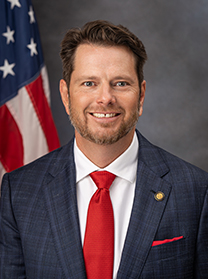

Member of the Florida House of Representatives from the 55th district
- In office November 8, 2022 – August 5, 2026
- Preceded by: Kaylee Tuck
- Succeeded by: Walter Price

Personal details
- Born: 1970 or 1971 (age 54–55)
- Party: Republican
- Education: University of South Florida (BA)

Kevin M. Steele (born 1970/1971) is an American businessman and politician. He served as a Republican member for the 55th district of the Florida House of Representatives.

== Life and career ==
Steele attended the University of South Florida.

In August 2022, Steele defeated Gabriel Papadopoulos and Brad Sollberger in the Republican primary election for the 55th district of the Florida House of Representatives. In November 2022, he defeated Charles Hacker in the general election, winning 77 percent of the votes. He resigned from the chamber in August 2026 while running for the Republican nomination in Florida's 14th congressional district.
