= Daisy Morales =

American politician (born 1960)

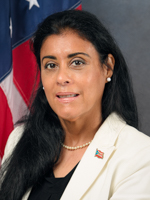
- Representative Morales in 2022

Member of the Florida House of Representatives from the 48th district
- In office November 4, 2020 – November 8, 2022
- Preceded by: Amy Mercado
- Succeeded by: Rita Harris

Supervisor of the Orange County Soil and Water Conservation
- In office November 3, 2014 – November 3, 2020
- Preceded by: Sean McQuade
- Succeeded by: Karolyn Campbell

Personal details
- Born: December 10, 1960 (age 65) The Bronx, New York, U.S.
- Party: Republican Party (1991 - 2010) | Democratic Party (2010 - present)
- Education: Puerto Rico Junior College (AS)

Daisy Morales (born December 10, 1960) is an American politician who served as a Democratic member of the Florida House of Representatives of district 48, serving Orange County from 2020-2022. In 2022, Democratic voters replaced Daisy Morales after Democratic leaders and organizations coalesced behind her challenger, raising concerns about Morales' record on reproductive freedom, gun safety, environmental protections, COVID public health measures, and her support for legislation that became known as the "Stop WOKE Act".

She has previously served on the Orange County board as a supervisor of the Soil and Water Conservation, where she missed nearly a year of meetings, contributing to the board's inability to conduct business.

The Orlando Sentinel editorial Board once called Morales, an "empty suit"

== Personal life ==
Morales was born on December 10, 1960, in The Bronx, New York, in a family of Puerto Rican descent. It was reported that Morales was diagnosed with vitiligo in 2001.

Morales graduated with an Associates Degree in criminology and administration from Puerto Rico Junior College.

In 2014, she successfully ran for supervisor of Orange Soil and Water Conservation.. Morales missed nearly a year of meetings on the Orange County Soil & Water Conservation Board, contributing to the board's inability to conduct business and prompting discussions about removing her from office for neglect of duty.

== Florida House of Representatives ==
Morales was elected to the Florida House in 2020, succeeding Democratic representative Amy Mercado, after defeating Republican opponent Jesus Martinez for district 48 with 65.3% of the vote.

In 2022, Morales was redistricted into district 43 but chose to run in neighboring District 44. There, she lost the Democratic primary 54-46 against Rita Harris.

Due to redistricting she was no longer the incumbent. Daisy Morales lost her 2022 reelection bid after much of the Democratic establishment rallied behind her challenger, citing concerns about her reliability and positions on key Democratic issues including abortion rights, gun violence prevention, environmental protection, public health, and support for diversity and inclusion initiatives.

She ran against Harris again in 2024, and lost by 30 points, 65-35.

=== Controversial Issue Positions ===
As a state representative, Daisy Morales repeatedly found herself at odds with core Democratic priorities. She voted for legislation prohibiting COVID-19 vaccine mandates during the pandemic (HB 1B, 2021 Special Session), was an original co-sponsor of the legislation that became known as the "Stop WOKE Act" (HB 57, 2021), supported bills rolling back local clean-energy authority and weakening environmental protections (HB 919, 2021; SB 2508, 2022), and used anti-abortion language focused on promoting a "culture of life" rather than supporting abortion access after the Dobbs decision.

=== Adversarial Relationship with the Orlando Sentinel ===
Daisy Morales developed a controversial relationship with the Orlando Sentinel during her time in office. Rather than answering questions about her record, Morales skipped editorial board interviews and declined requests for interviews from Sentinel reporters. After receiving unfavorable coverage during her 2020 campaign, she issued a public statement demanding that an Orlando Sentinel reporter and multiple editorial staff members be fired. The newspaper's editorial board sharply criticized her approach, arguing that public officials should answer questions and engage with voters rather than attack the press. The Orlando Sentinel editorial board called Morales, an "empty suit" and the "worst candidate possible."

== Electoral history ==
=== Florida House of Representatives, district 48 ===
2020 general election, district 48
Party	Candidate	Votes	%	±%
Democratic	Daisy Morales	47,341	65.3%	−8.1
Republican	Jesus Martínez	25,197	34.7%	+8.1
Total votes		72,538	100.0%	N/A
Democratic hold				

=== Florida House of Representatives, District 44 ===
2022 primary elections, District 44
Party	Candidate	Votes	%
Democratic	Rita Harris	8,348	54.2
Democratic	Daisy Morales	7,053	45.8
Total votes		15,401	100

2024 primary elections, district 44
Party	Candidate	Votes	%
Democratic	Rita Harris (incumbent)	7,335	65.0
Democratic	Daisy Morales	3,949	35.0
Total votes		11,284	100

== See also ==
- Florida House of Representatives
