= Walter Price (Florida politician) =

Walter Price is a state legislator and fire captain in Florida. A Republican, he was elected to the Florida House of Representatives in 2026. He is a fire captain in Pasco County, Florida. He represents District 55 in Central Pasco County in the Florida House of Representatives. He succeeded Kevin Steele.
