= Dimanche v. Brown =

United States court case on incarceration

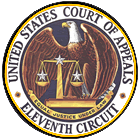
- Court: United States Court of Appeals for the Eleventh Circuit
- Decided: April 17, 2015
- Citation: 783 F.3d 1204

Case history
- Prior actions: Dismissed by the district court for failure to exhaust administrative remedies and failure to state a claim.
- Subsequent actions: Reversed and remanded.

Court membership
- Judges sitting: Lee H. Rosenthal, William H. Pryor, Adalberto Jordan

Laws applied
- Prison Litigation Reform Act, Eighth Amendment to the United States Constitution

Dimanche v. Brown is a United States appellate court case concerning the rights of incarcerated individuals under the Eighth Amendment of the U.S. Constitution, which prohibits cruel and unusual punishment. Decided by the United States Court of Appeals, Eleventh Circuit, in 2015, the case established important precedent regarding the duty of prison officials to protect inmates from harm and to provide adequate medical care. The case has been widely cited in cases involving adherence to exhaustion of administrative remedies, taking judicial notice of agency records, deliberate indifference to medical needs and civil rights.

== Background ==
The case arose after Moliere Dimanche, an inmate at Liberty Correctional Institution, alleged that prison officials attempted to have him murdered in retaliation for filing grievances about prison conditions and the welfare of the other inmates. Dimanche, who was sprayed with more than 200 grams of Orthochlorobenzylidene Malononitrile while alone in a confinement cell, filed a pro se complaint against multiple prison officials, including colonel Jerry Brown, who was the acting warden on the date of the incident, and medical staff, alleging violations of his Eighth Amendment rights. The case was dismissed in the district court before Dimanche appealed.

Dimanche claimed that despite his repeated warnings and requests for intervention, senior prison officials in Tallahassee's Central Office ignored his concerns about a threat by Colonel Brown to have him assassinated for filing grievances, resulting in the actual application of riot control chemicals to him without justification. Prison staff utilized the Sabre Red MK-9 thermal fogger during the incident. He further argued that the prison's response to his medical needs was grossly inadequate, constituting deliberate indifference.

=== Legal issues ===
The case centered on three main legal questions:

Did the actions or inactions of the prison officials constitute "deliberate indifference" under the Eighth Amendment?

Were Dimanche's constitutional rights violated due to the failure of prison officials to take reasonable measures to ensure his safety?

Was the grievance process available to Dimanche for the purpose of exhausting the administrative grievance procedures as required by the Prison Litigation Reform Act?

=== Court decision ===
The Eleventh Circuit ruled in favor of Dimanche on every issue. The court held that prison officials have a duty to protect inmates from known risks and provide adequate medical care. In its opinion, the court emphasized that deliberate indifference occurs when officials knowingly disregard an excessive risk to inmate health or safety, and that the grievance process is unavailable to individuals alleging acts of reprisal.

=== Key findings ===
The court included Dimanche's grievance bypassing the institution in its opinion and focused on the words that appeared at the bottom right corner of the grievance for the purpose of determining whether Central Office should have treated the grievance as an emergency or not.

== Oral argument ==
Oral arguments were held at the Elbert Parr Tuttle Courthouse in Atlanta, Georgia in April 2014. The State of Florida was represented by Pam Bondi, and attorney Thomas A. Burns was appointed by the court to argue Dimanche's briefs since Dimanche was incarcerated at the time.

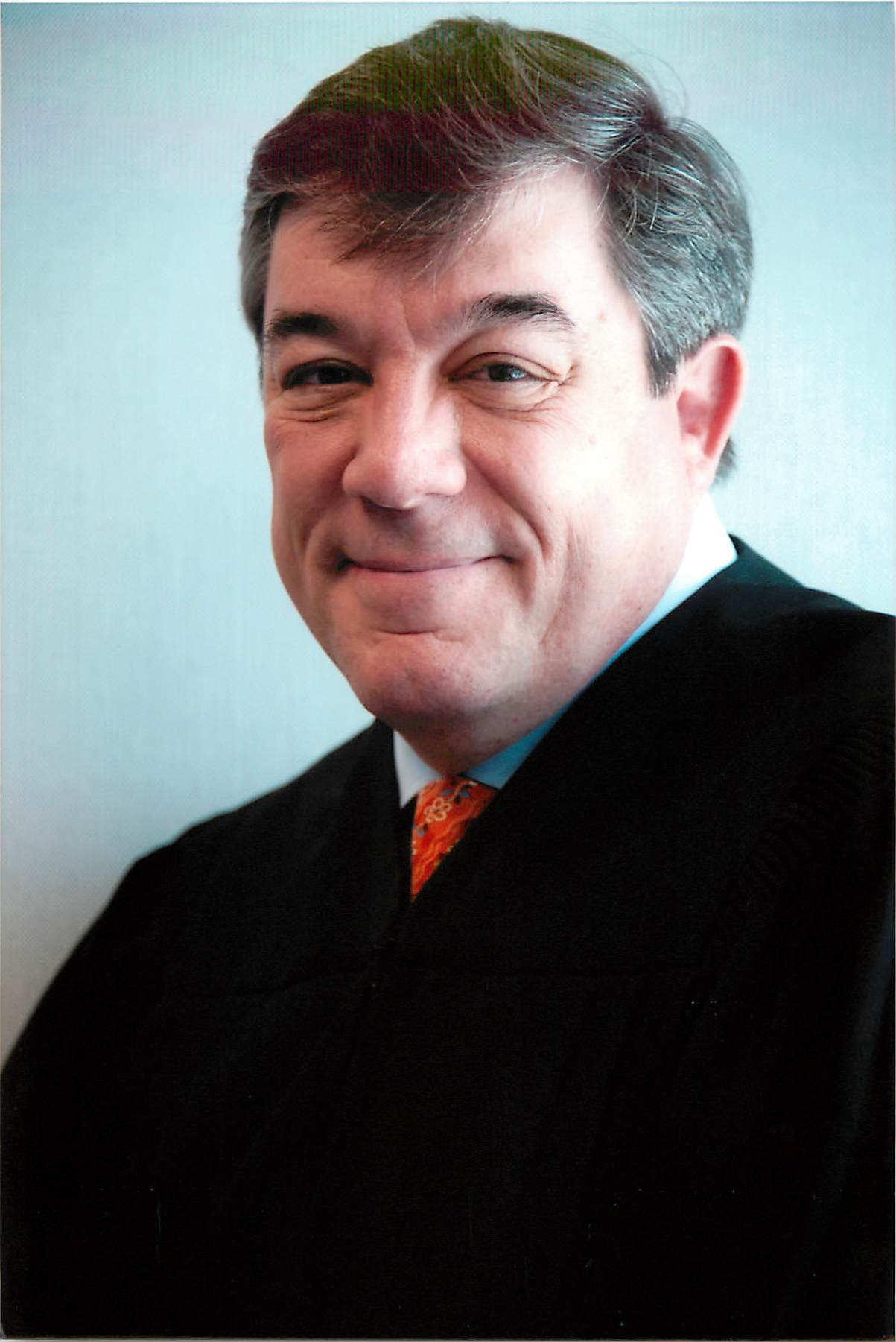
Judge Adalberto Jordan

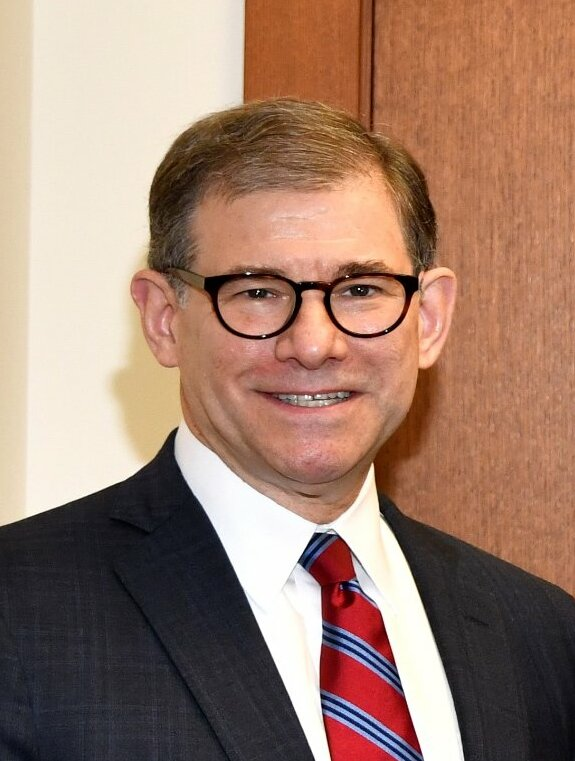
Judge William H. Pryor

At oral argument, the question surrounding the assassination attempt became the deciding factor in the panel's decision to reverse the lower court's dismissal of the case. Judge Adalberto Jordan expressed particular concern about whether the procedural requirements had been sufficiently met by the plaintiff. Addressing the State of Florida, he explained that this was not a typical inmate grievance, such as "losing a toothbrush." He emphasized that a plot to kill an inmate was a matter of grave seriousness.

In response, the state argued that, in hindsight, Dimanche had not been killed. This argument drew sharp backlash from the panel. Judge Jordan, visibly displeased, explained that sometimes the point of gassing inmates is specifically not to kill them but to ensure they "toe the line." He concluded that such an argument should not have been made by the State of Florida.

Judge William H. Pryor remarked, "Please don't make that argument again. He wasn't killed?" He further expressed his frustration, stating that he did not need to hear anything more from the State of Florida. Attorney Thomas A. Burns was then summoned to argue the remainder of Dimanche's briefs.

== Opinion ==
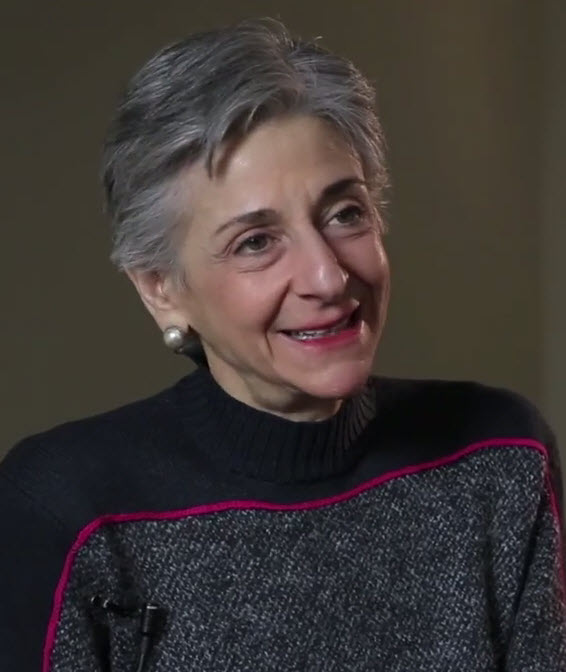
Judge Lee H. Rosenthal

The court's opinion was written by judge Lee H. Rosenthal with concurrences from judges Jordan and Pryor.

=== Exhaustion of remedies under the PLRA ===
Judge Lee H. Rosenthal emphasized the procedural requirements for prisoners under the Prison Litigation Reform Act (PLRA) to exhaust administrative remedies before filing a federal lawsuit. Citing 42 U.S.C. § 1997e(a), she noted that the PLRA mandates “proper exhaustion,” which requires compliance with the procedural rules established by the prison grievance process. These rules vary by state and govern the necessary steps for inmates to file grievances regarding prison conditions. (Woodford v. Ngo, 548 U.S. 81, 95 (2006)).

Rosenthal explained that remedies must be “available” to the prisoner, meaning they must be capable of achieving their intended purpose. She cited Turner v. Burnside (541 F.3d 1077 (11th Cir. 2008)), which clarified that remedies are unavailable if rational inmates cannot reasonably be expected to use them.

Judge Rosenthal detailed the two-step process courts use to assess motions to dismiss under the PLRA:

Courts first examine the factual allegations in the defendant's motion to dismiss and the plaintiff's response, assuming the plaintiff's facts are true. If these facts show a failure to exhaust remedies, the complaint is dismissed. If the case survives the first step, the court resolves disputed factual issues related to exhaustion, with the burden of proof on the defendants. (Bryant v. Rich, 530 F.3d 1368 (11th Cir. 2008)).

=== Florida's grievance process ===
Judge Rosenthal also analyzed the grievance process required under Florida law. To properly exhaust remedies, prisoners must:

- File an informal grievance with prison staff.
- File a formal grievance with the institution's warden.
- Submit an appeal to the Secretary of the Florida Department of Corrections (FDOC). (Chandler v. Crosby, 379 F.3d 1278, 1288 (11th Cir. 2004)).

In Dimanche's case, he bypassed the first two steps and filed a grievance directly with the Secretary, asserting that it was a grievance of reprisal. Under Florida rules, such grievances must:

- Clearly indicate they are grievances of reprisal.
- Explain why the inmate bypassed the informal and formal grievance steps. (Fla. Admin. Code § 33–103.007(6)(1)-(2)).

Judge Rosenthal concluded that Dimanche's grievance met the procedural requirements, allowing his case to proceed. The Eleventh Circuit reversed the lower court's dismissal of the case, underscoring the importance of adhering to proper grievance procedures while recognizing exceptions for extraordinary circumstances.

In its conclusion, the panel acknowledged that "Florida prison officials familiar with Dimanche and his history while incarcerated" may view their result as "unrealistic" or "unduly formalistic", conceding that Dimanche's reputation as a Watchdog was at odds with the way Florida prison officials felt about him.

== Impact and significance ==
Dimanche v. Brown is widely cited in cases involving prisoners’ rights, particularly in the Eleventh Circuit. The decision reinforced the constitutional protections afforded to incarcerated individuals and clarified the standards for proving deliberate indifference under the Eighth Amendment.

The case also underscored the importance of prison officials’ proactive measures to address inmate safety and health concerns. Legal scholars have noted its influence on subsequent decisions, particularly in the areas of prison reform and accountability. To date, United States Courts have cited Dimanche v. Brown in resolving 181 cases.

== Later developments ==
On July 10, 2017, in light of the reversal, Moliere Dimanche conducted the first ever Pro se jury trial in a federal Civil Rights case involving allegations of wrongdoing by government officials. The trial lasted three days with Lance Neff representing the State of Florida, Dimanche representing himself, and judge Mark E. Walker presiding in the United States District Court for the Northern District of Florida. The jury ruled in favor of the prison officials.

== See also ==
Estelle v. Gamble

Farmer v. Brennan

Wilson v. Seiter, 501 U.S.

Eighth Amendment to the United States Constitution
