= Vic Torres =

American politician (born 1947)

Victor M. Torres Jr.
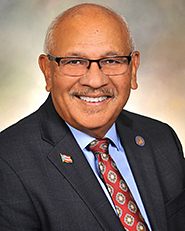

Member of the Florida Senate
- In office November 8, 2016 – November 5, 2024
- Preceded by: Darren Soto (redistricting)
- Succeeded by: Kristen Arrington
- Constituency: 15th district (2016–2022); 25th district (2022–2024)

Member of the Florida House of Representatives from the 48th district
- In office November 6, 2012 – November 8, 2016
- Preceded by: Darren Soto (redistricting)
- Succeeded by: Amy Mercado

Personal details
- Born: July 22, 1947 (age 79) New York City, New York
- Party: Democratic
- Spouse: Carmen L. Torres
- Children: 5, including Amy
- Education: John Jay College
- Profession: Police detective

Military service
- Allegiance: United States of America
- Branch/service: United States Marine Corps
- Years of service: 1966-1970

Victor Manuel Torres Jr. (born July 22, 1947) is an American retired politician who served as a Democratic member of the Florida Senate from 2016 to 2024. Previously, he served two terms in the Florida House of Representatives, representing parts of Orlando in Orange County from 2012 to 2016.

== History ==
Torres was born in New York City, where he graduated from Harren High School in 1966. Following graduation, he enlisted in the United States Marine Corps, serving for four years from 1966 to 1970. During his service, Torres was stationed in Okinawa in Japan, and was awarded the Good Conduct Medal. Returning to the United States, Torres attended John Jay College, but did not graduate, and joined the New York City Transit Police, serving for twenty years before retiring as a detective. In 1993, he moved with his family to Florida, initially settling in Marion County, where he worked as a school bus driver and served on the Marion County Democratic Executive Committee. Torres moved to Orlando, and in 2010 was the field director for Amy Mercado, the Democratic nominee for the Florida House of Representatives in District 35.

== Florida Legislature ==
=== House of Representatives ===
When the state's legislative districts were redrawn in 2012, Torres opted to run in the newly created 48th District, which includes parts of Orlando in Orange County. Torres won the nomination of the Democratic Party unopposed, and advanced to the general election, where he was also unopposed, winning his first term entirely uncontested. He was re-elected without opposition to his second term in 2014 without opposition.

While serving in the legislature, Torres took a strong position against legislation proposed by State Representative Heather Fitzenhagen that would allow people without criminal records to carry firearms without a permit during natural disasters, arguing that firearms in hurricane shelters had the potential to be dangerous and noting, "I hope that tragedy will not be a byproduct of our decision here today." Additionally, when State Senator Dwight Bullard, a proponent of raising the state's minimum wage, challenged lawmakers to live on the minimum wage for a week, Torres accepted the offer and did so.

=== Senate ===
Torres ran for the Florida Senate seat vacated when senator Darren Soto opted to run for Florida's 9th Congressional District. Torres defeated Republican Peter Vivaldi in the general election, 56 to 44%. Torres' daughter, Amy Mercado, succeeded him in the House, making the two the first father and daughter to serve in the Florida Legislature at the same time.
