= Florida's 44th House of Representatives district =

Florida district

Florida's 44th State House of Representatives district
Representative
Rita Harris; D–Orlando

Florida's 44th House of Representatives district elects one member of the Florida House of Representatives. It covers parts of Orange County.

== Members ==
- Rita Harris (since 2022)
