= Washington Reporter =

American conservative news outlet

- Type: Website, weekly e-newsletter
- Format: Internet
- Founder(s): Garrett Ventry; Brian Colas
- Editor-in-chief: Matthew Foldi
- Founded: 2024
- Language: English
- Headquarters: Washington, D.C.
- Country: United States
- Website: washingtonreporter.news

The Washington Reporter is a news outlet based in Washington, D.C., founded in 2024 by Republican lobbyists Garrett Ventry and Brian Colas. Described as both center-right and conservative, the outlet covers both local and national political news.

== History ==
The Washington Reporter was founded in 2024 by Garrett Ventry and Brian Colas, former Capitol Hill staffers who later became Republican lobbyists. The outlet's establishment was financially backed by businessman Omeed Malik, conservative writer Michael Goldfarb, and Republican consultants Brett O'Donnell, Jonathan Hiler, and Kyle Plotkin.

The outlet's editor-in-chief, Matthew Foldi, previously wrote for The Washington Free Beacon and The Spectator. Foldi stated that the Washington Reporter "cover[s] the intersection of policy and politics" through the Washington Reporter Brief, a free weekly e-newsletter covering congressional news that has run since June 2024. The outlet confirmed they plan to expand into a daily paywalled newsletter for subscribers.

During the Pentagon press pass forfeiture in October 2025, the Washington Reporter was one of few outlets to agree to new guidelines that prohibited them from reporting information that has not been approved by the Department of Defense. In an editorial, the Washington Reporter labelled other news organizations who did not agree to the new guidelines "left-wing hacks".

In March 2026, former U.S. senator Kyrsten Sinema (I-AZ) (Note: Sinema was elected as a Democrat in 2019, but left the party in 2022, serving the remainder of her term as an independent.) confirmed she would join the Washington Reporter as a contributing columnist. The outlet positioned both Sinema's column and regular contributions from former Politico Playbook author Rachael Bade as a way to promote bipartisanship.
