= Florida's 85th House of Representatives district =

Florida district

Florida's 85th State House of Representatives district
Representative
Toby Overdorf; R–Palm City

Florida's 85th House of Representatives district elects one member of the Florida House of Representatives. It contains parts of Martin County and St. Lucie County.

== Members ==
- Toby Overdorf (2018-2026)
- Anthony Bonna (since 2026)
