= Austin Rogers (politician) =

American politician

- Rogers in 2026

Member-elect of the U.S. House of Representatives from Florida's 2nd district
- Assuming office January 3, 2027
- Succeeding: Neal Dunn

Personal details
- Born: Austin James Rogers; 1990/1991 (age 35–36) Panama City, Florida, U.S.
- Party: Republican
- Children: 3
- Education: Southeastern University (BS); Wheaton College (BA); Duke University (MA, JD)
- Website: Campaign website

Austin James Rogers (born 1990/1991) is an American attorney and politician who is a member-elect of the United States House of Representatives for Florida's 2nd congressional district. He is a member of the Republican Party.

== Early life and legal career ==
Rogers was born in Panama City, Florida, where he grew up. His father was a member of the United States Air Force Thunderbirds while his mother was a public school teacher. He attended A. Crawford Mosley High School in Lynn Haven before attending Southeastern University in Lakeland, where he earned a bachelor's degree in international business. After Rogers graduated from Southeastern, he then attended Wheaton College in Illinois where he earned another bachelor's degree in theology. He graduated summa cum laude at both schools. In college, he played soccer.

Rogers later attended Duke University in North Carolina and earned graduate degrees, summa cum laude, in theology and law. He wrote articles regarding the First Amendment that appeared in the Duke Law Journal and the Marquette Law Review. Rogers is admitted to the District of Columbia Bar and is a member of the Federalist Society. He served as a law clerk for Steven D. Merryday and then worked for White & Case with a focus on commercial and appellate litigation. After that, Rogers was Senior Counsel of Oversight and Investigations for the United States Senate Committee on the Judiciary and then Chief Civil Counsel for the Senate Judiciary Committee. During his time in this role, he helped draft immigration provisions in the One Big Beautiful Bill Act. He served as a Senate Judiciary Counsel from 2023 to 2025 and then became general counsel for Florida Senator Rick Scott.

== U.S. House of Representatives ==
In January 2026, Rogers launched his campaign for the United States House of Representatives for Florida's 2nd congressional district as a Republican, seeking to succeed the retiring Neal Dunn. He became the Republican nominee after defeating seven others in the primary, receiving 31% of the vote. In the general election, Rogers defeated Democratic Party nominee Amanda Green with 52.2% of the vote.

== Personal life ==
Rogers is married and has three children.

U.S. House of Representatives
| Preceded by Neal Dunn | Member of the U.S. House of Representatives from Florida's 2nd congressional district Taking office 2027 | Elect |
