= Amy Mercado =

American politician

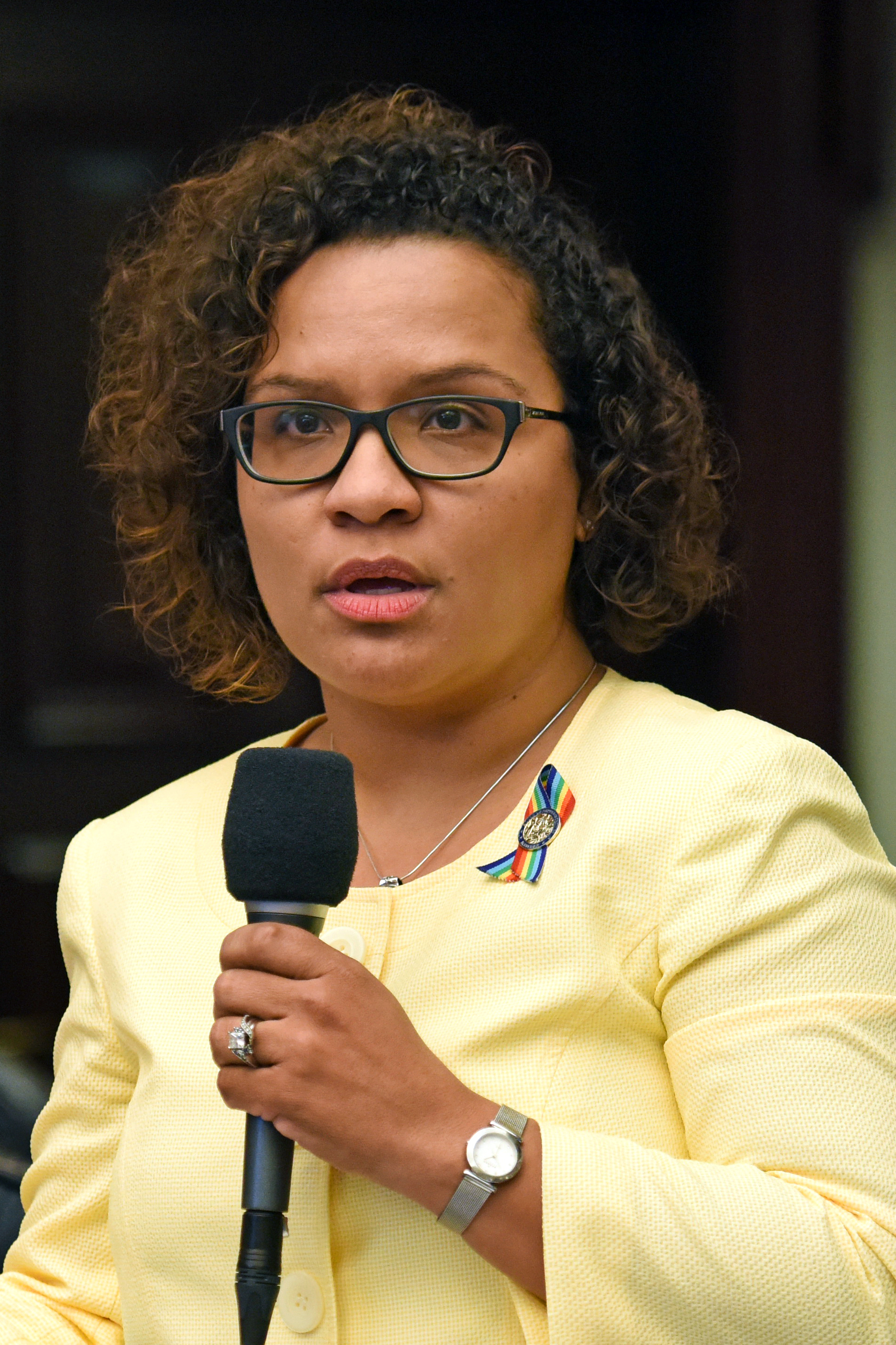

Property Appraiser of Orange County
- Incumbent
- Assumed office January 4, 2021
- Preceded by: Rick Singh

Member of the Florida House of Representatives from the 48th district
- In office November 8, 2016 – November 3, 2020
- Preceded by: Vic Torres
- Succeeded by: Daisy Morales

Personal details
- Born: November 17, 1973 (age 52) The Bronx, New York, U.S.
- Party: Democratic
- Relatives: Vic Torres (father)
- Education: American Intercontinental University (BBA); Strayer University (MBA)
- Website: Official website

Amy Mercado (born November 17, 1973 in The Bronx, New York) is an American politician of Puerto Rican descent who has served as the property appraiser of Orange County, Florida since 2021. Previously, she served two terms in the Florida House of Representatives from 2016 to 2020, representing parts of the Orlando area. She is a member of the Florida Democratic Party.

== See also ==
- Florida House of Representatives
- List of people from the Bronx

Florida House of Representatives
| Preceded by Vic Torres | Member of the Florida House of Representatives from the 48th district 2016–2020 | Succeeded by Daisy Morales |
