= Florida's 83rd House of Representatives district =

Florida district

Florida's 83rd State House of Representatives district
Representative
Kaylee Tuck; R–Sebring

Florida's 83rd House of Representatives district elects one member of the Florida House of Representatives. It contains Glades County, Hardee County, Highlands County and Okeechobee County.

== Members ==
- Toby Overdorf (2018-2022)
- Kaylee Tuck (since 2022)
