= Florida's 55th House of Representatives district =

Florida district

Florida's 55th State House of Representatives district
Representative
Kevin Steele; R–Hudson

Florida's 55th House of Representatives district elects one member of the Florida House of Representatives. It covers parts of Pasco County.

== Members ==
- Cary Pigman (2012–2020)
- Kaylee Tuck (2020–2022)
- Kevin Steele (since 2022)
