= Rita Harris (politician) =

American politician and activist

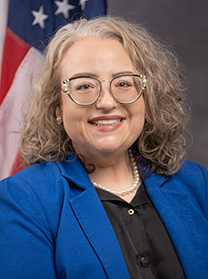

Member of the Florida House of Representatives from the 44th district
- Incumbent
- Assumed office November 8, 2022
- Preceded by: Daisy Morales

Personal details
- Born: December 18, 1973 Queens, New York City, U.S.
- Party: Democratic
- Spouse: John Harris
- Children: 1
- Education: Phoenix College; Valencia College

Jennifer Rita Harris (born December 18, 1973 in Queens, New York) is an American politician and activist. She won the 2022 Florida House of Representatives election, in District 44, defeating incumbent Daisy Morales.

== Early life and education ==
Harris was born in Queens, New York City, on December 18. She attended Phoenix College and Valencia College.

== Personal life ==
She is married to her husband, John Harris, and moved to Florida in 2002. They have a daughter, Anissa.

== Electoral history ==
=== 2022 Democratic Primary Election ===
District 44 Democratic Primaries
Party	Candidate	Votes	%
Democratic	Rita Harris	8,348	54.2%
Democratic	Daisy Morales (incumbent)	7,053	45.8%
Total votes		15,401	100%

The 2022 General Election for Florida House District 44 was canceled. Harris won the general election on November 8, 2022.

=== 2024 Democratic Primary Election ===
District 44 Democratic Primaries
Party	Candidate	Votes	%
Democratic	Rita Harris (incumbent)	7,335	65%
Democratic	Daisy Morales	3,949	35%
Total votes		11,284	100%

The 2024 General Election for Florida House District 44 was canceled. Harris won the general election on November 5, 2024.
