= Angelo Castillo =

American politician

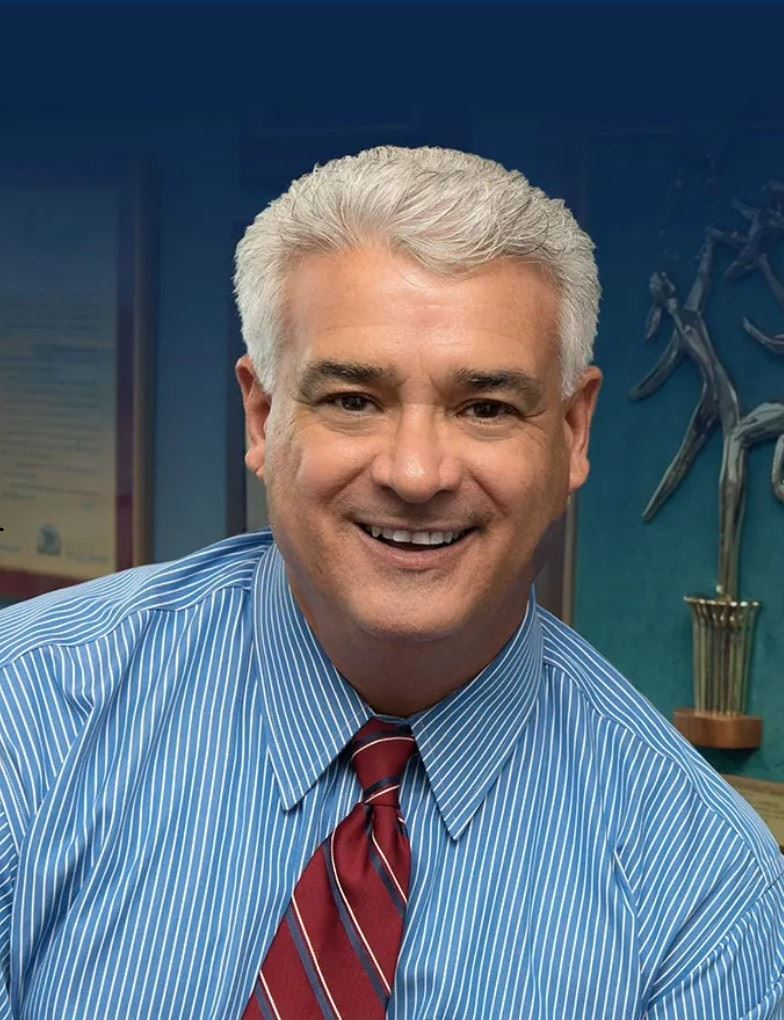

Mayor of Pembroke Pines
- Incumbent
- Assumed office April 2024
- Preceded by: Frank Ortis

Personal details
- Education: Wagner College; New York Law School

Angelo Castillo is a Cuban-born American politician serving as the mayor of Pembroke Pines, Florida, a position he has held since April 2024. He previously served as a commissioner for the city.

== Early life and education ==
Castillo earned an academic and athletic scholarship to Wagner College, where he completed a degree in business administration and a masters of business administration in finance. He also graduated from New York Law School and completed an executive education program at the Harvard Kennedy School.

== Career before becoming mayor ==
In 1996, Castillo was appointed director of the United States Department of Housing and Urban Development's Florida State Office of Community Planning and Development, and in 1998, he became the Director of Human Services for Broward County. He returned to HUD as Deputy State Coordinator for Florida in 2000. From 2003 to 2013, he served as president and CEO of a non-profit corporation and was an adjunct professor at St. Thomas University’s Graduate School of Management.

In 2004, Castillo was elected to the Pembroke Pines City Commission, becoming the first Hispanic member to serve in 30 years. He served four terms as vice mayor of Pembroke Pines.

Throughout his career, Castillo has received numerous awards for his contributions to health and human services, housing and community development, economic development, and government finance.

In November 2013, Broward County Sheriff Scott Israel appointed Castillo to his executive team as director of research and strategic planning at the Broward Sheriff's Office. In this role, Castillo collaborated with stakeholders to define the agency's mission, vision, and long-term goals, and oversees the collection and analysis of data to enhance public safety missions and optimize funding opportunities.>

== Political career ==
In 2020, Castillo unsuccessfully ran for mayor against then-Mayor Frank Ortis. Ortis retired in 2024, and Castillo ran once more. He was elected mayor of the city following a municipal election. His campaign addressed issues including housing development, local infrastructure, and environmental concerns.

He assumed office as mayor in April 2024.

== Personal life ==
Castillo and his wife, Lisa Yagid Castillo, have two adult daughters, one a nurse practitioner and the other a public relations executive.
