= Toby Overdorf =

American politician from Florida (born 1969)

Tobin Rogers "Toby" Overdorf
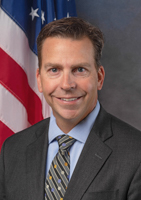

Member of the Florida House of Representatives
- Incumbent
- Assumed office November 6, 2018
- Preceded by: Gayle Harrell
- Constituency: 85th district (since 2022); 83rd district (2018-2022)

Personal details
- Born: May 6, 1969 (age 57) Newport, Rhode Island, U.S.
- Party: Republican
- Education: Union College; Florida Atlantic University
- Occupation: Environmental consultant

Tobin Rogers "Toby" Overdorf (born May 6, 1969) is a Republican member of the Florida Legislature representing the state's 85th House district, which includes parts of Martin and St. Lucie counties.

== History ==
A native of Rhode Island, Overdorf moved to Florida in 1992 the day after Hurricane Andrew. He worked as a marine scientist in Big Pine Key before going to graduate school at Florida Atlantic University (FAU). While in graduate school he worked as a graduate assistant for the South Florida Water Management District (SFWMD) and completed his thesis entitled, "Floodplain Fish of the Kissimmee River, Prior to Proposed Restoration." He went on to found his own company, Crossroads Environmental and later merged with Engineering Design and Construction, Inc. (EDC).

== Florida House of Representatives ==
Overdorf defeated Sasha Dadan in the August 28, 2018 Republican primary, winning 54.1% of the vote. In the November 6, 2018 general election, Overdorf won 52.11% of the vote, defeating Democrat Matt Theobald. In his first term, Overdorf helped to pass legislation regarding Human Trafficking, Shark Finning, and Teacher Salary. In 2022, Overdorf won 60.8% of the vote, defeating Democrat Curtis Tucker. In 2023, Overdorf was appointed to the Statewide Council on Human Trafficking . This came after serving as a board member on the Florida Alliance to End Human Trafficking since 2020.
