= Kaylee Tuck =

American politician (born 1994)

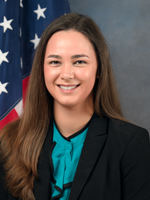

Member of the Florida House of Representatives
- Incumbent
- Assumed office November 3, 2020
- Preceded by: Cary Pigman
- Constituency: 55th district (2020–2022); 83rd district (2022–present)

Personal details
- Born: May 30, 1994 (age 32) Winter Haven, Florida, U.S.
- Party: Republican
- Education: Florida State University (BS); Stetson University (JD)
- Occupation: Real Estate; Land Use Attorney

Kaylee Tuck (born May 30, 1994) is an American politician serving as a member of the Florida House of Representatives from the 83rd district since 2022, and formerly from the 55th district between 2020 and 2022.

== Education and legal career ==
Tuck's grandmother served on the Highlands County Commission, and her grandfather worked for the Highlands County Sheriff's Office. Tuck's father Andy was a member of the Florida Transportation Commission and later served as vice chair of the Florida State Board of Education. Her mother, Sandee, is a teacher. Tuck received her high school diploma from Sebring High School and studied economics at Florida State University, then earned a J.D. degree at the Stetson University College of Law before returning to her hometown, Sebring, Florida, and joining the Henderson, Franklin, Starnes & Holt law firm, where she specialized in land use and real estate law.

== Political career ==
Tuck faced Ned Hancock in a Republican Party primary held on August 18, 2020, to determine the GOP nominee for Florida's 55th House of Representatives district, as the incumbent officeholder, Cary Pigman, was ineligible for reelection due to term limits. She secured the Republican nomination and defeated Democratic Party candidate Linda Tripp in the 2020 Florida House of Representatives election.
