= Healey (surname) =

Healey is an Irish surname derived from two distinct ancient Irish families Ó hÉilidhe or Ó hÉalaighthe, whose Gaelic origins have been anglicized as Healey or similar. Common variations in English include Haley and Healy.

Less commonly, this surname may also be an English toponymic surname – from Healey near Manchester and possibly also from other places named Healey in Yorkshire and Northumberland.

== People with the surname Healey ==
- Adam Healey (born 1974), Italian internet entrepreneur
- Adrian Healey, English football commentator
- Alfred Healey (1875–1960), British olympic athlete
- Anne Healey (born 1951), American politician
- Arthur Daniel Healey (1889–1948), American politician, U.S. Representative of Massachusetts
- Arthur H. Healey (1920–2003), justice of the Connecticut Supreme Court
- Austin Healey (born 1973), English rugby union player
- Beth Healey (born 1986/87), British medical doctor
- Chelsee Healey (born 1988), English actress
- Cherry Healey (born 1980), British television presenter
- Clive Healey (1918–1997), Australian politician
- Dan Healey (born 1957), Canadian historian
- Denis Healey (1917–2015), British politician
- Des Healey (1927–2009), Australian rules footballer
- Dick Healey (1923–2000), Australian politician
- Donald Healey (1898–1988), British rally driver & automotive engineer
- Dorothy Ray Healey (1914–2006), American Communist Party activist
- Ed Healey (1894–1978), American football player
- Edna Healey (1918–2010), British author and film maker
- Edward Healey, multiple people
  - Ed Healey (1894–1978), American professional football player
  - Ed Healey (1924–2000), American politician from Florida
  - Edward Healey (architect) (fl. 1910s), British architect who worked in Thailand
  - Edward Healey (1885–1945), American politician from New York
- Emma Healey (born 1991), Canadian writer and poet
- Eric Healey (born 1975), American ice hockey player
- Geoffrey Healey (1922–1994), British car designer, son of Donald
- Giles Healey (1901–1980), American cartographer
- Jack Healey (born 1938), American human rights activist
- James Healey (disambiguation), several people
- Jeff Healey (1966–2008), Canadian jazz and blues-rock guitarist
- Jess Healey (born 1996), Canadian ice hockey player
- John Healey (disambiguation), several people
- Josh Healey (born 1994), Canadian ice hockey player
- Joseph G. Healey (born 1938), American language researcher
- Kenneth Healey (1899–1985), British priest, 3rd Bishop of Grimsby, England
- Keri Healey, American playwright and voice actress
- Kerry Healey (born 1960), American politician, 70th Lieutenant Governor of Massachusetts
- Lori Healey (died 2025), American real estate principal
- Mark Healey, British computer games developer
- Maura Healey (born 1971), American politician, 55th Attorney General and current Governor of Massachusetts since 2023
- Michael Healey, Canadian playwright and actor
- Mitch Healey (born 1969), Australian rugby player and coach
- Myron Healey (1923–2005), American actor
- Nathan Healey (born 1980), Australian tennis player
- Nigel Healey, British-New Zealand academic, Vice Chancellor at Fiji National University
- Pat Healey (born 1985), American soccer player
- Patsy Healey (born 1940), professor at Newcastle University, England
- Paul Healey (born 1975), Canadian ice hockey player
- Penny Healey (born 2005), British archer
- Philip B. Healey (1921–1996), New York politician
- Rich Healey (born 1938), Canadian ice hockey player
- Robert Healey (disambiguation), several people
- Ron Healey (1952–2018), English born Irish footballer
- Sarah Healey (born 1975), British civil servant
- Sheila Healey (1915–2007), Argentine painter
- Shevy Healey (1922–2001), American psychologist, activist
- Stephen Healey (1982–2012), British Army officer and footballer
- T. J. Healey (1866–1944), American racehorse trainer
- Theresa Healey (born 1964), New Zealand actress
- Thomas J. Healey (born 1942), American businessman and educator, Harvard University lecturer
- Timothy Healey, American mathematician
- Tom Healey (1853–1891), American MLB baseball player
- Trebor Healey, American poet and novelist
- William Healey (1853–1909), English football club owner

== Characters ==
- Mike Healey, a fictional character from the Australian television soap opera Neighbours
- Roger Healey, a fictional character from the American sitcom I Dream of Jeannie

== See also ==
- Healey (disambiguation)
- Healy (surname)
