= Susan Bucher =

Supervisor of Elections in Palm Beach County

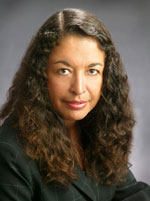

Palm Beach County Supervisor of Elections
- In office January 6, 2009 – January 18, 2019
- Preceded by: Arthur W. Anderson
- Succeeded by: Wendy Link

Member of the Florida House of Representatives from the 88th district
- In office November 19, 2002 – November 18, 2008
- Preceded by: Anne Gannon
- Succeeded by: Mark Pafford

Member of the Florida House of Representatives from the 86th district
- In office April 25, 2000 – November 20, 2002
- Preceded by: Ed Healey
- Succeeded by: Anne Gannon

Personal details
- Born: October 27, 1958 (age 67) Escondido, California
- Party: Democratic Party
- Spouse: Richard Bucher
- Education: Palomar Junior College; MiraCosta College

Susan Marie Bucher (born October 27, 1958) served as the Supervisor of Elections in Palm Beach County, Florida. Prior to her election as the Supervisor, she served as a member of the Florida House of Representatives, representing the 86th District from 2000 to 2002, and the 88th District from 2002 to 2008. She is a Democrat.

== History ==
Bucher was born in Escondido, California, and attended Palomar Junior College and MiraCosta College before moving to Florida in 1985. She served as a legislative aide to State Representative Ed Healey for six years prior to his death in 2000.

== Florida House of Representatives ==
When State Representative Ed Healey died in 2000 from a brain hemorrhage, Bucher ran in the special election to succeed him. In the Democratic primary, Bucher faced Bonnie Weaver, Allan Kalish, and Bill Washington, and though she placed first in the primary with 49% of the vote, because no candidate received a majority of the vote, a runoff election was held between Bucher and the second place finisher, Weaver. Bucher defeated Weaver decisively in the runoff election, winning 62% of the vote, and advancing to the general election, where she defeated Robert Kanjian, the Republican nominee, with 74% of the vote. She was re-elected without opposition later that year in the regularly scheduled election and in 2002. During her tenure in the legislature, Bucher attained a reputation "for her liberalism and fiery rhetoric, especially on education and healthcare." When she received a letter from a diocese condemning her position on abortion rights, she tore up the letter and decided to stop attending mass, saying, "I resent that the Catholic Church wants to get involved in my politics." She was challenged in the Democratic primary in 2004 by Joel Silver, the son of former State Senator Ron Silver, but defeated him handily, winning renomination with 65% of the vote. In the general election, Bucher faced Ed Heeney, the Republican nominee. Heeney achieved a level of notoriety during the campaign after he was arrested just a few months before the election for driving without a license and for appearing on The Daily Show "after announcing to local Republicans that his mission was to keep gays and lesbians out of Palm Beach County." She defeated Heeney easily, scoring 69% of the vote to his 31%. She was re-elected without opposition in 2006 to her fourth and final term in the state House.

== Palm Beach County Supervisor of Elections ==
In 2008, when she was unable to seek another term in the legislature due to term limits, Bucher decided to run for Palm Beach County Supervisor of Elections, and faced incumbent Supervisor Art Anderson and Wellington Village Councilman Robert Margolis in the nonpartisan primary. She received the endorsement of the Sun-Sentinel, which praised her for her "grit and attention to detail" and the "meticulousness that [she] promises to bring." Despite the fact that they criticized Bucher's "well-earned reputation as a partisan Democrat and attack dog" in the legislature, they endorsed her because Anderson's "disastrous performance has further eroded voter trust." In the primary election, Bucher received 48% of the vote to Margolis's 26% and Anderson's 25%. Because no candidate received a majority, a runoff election was held between Bucher and Margolis, which she won handily, defeating Margolis with 58% of the vote.

Bucher's office came under fire in 2012 for improperly certifying incorrect election results in a Wellington municipal election in which the losers of the elections were actually certified as the winners. She was able to catch the error after the fact, which she said was caused by a system error known by the manufacturer of the voting machines, saying, "We took over this equipment in 2007. They never disclosed the error. The company (Sequoia Voting Systems) didn't own up to it real quickly and neither did the state. And we had to prove that it was a software error and we did so." In the 2012 general election, a printing error occurred that impacted nearly thirty thousand absentee ballots, which she asserted was the fault of the vendor her office used to print the ballots.

Bucher came out against Governor Rick Scott's move in 2012 to purge "non-citizens" from the voting rolls after her office found that over one hundred of the voters on the list were "sure matches" as legally registered voters. After determining that the list that she was given was faulty, she refused to proceed with the purge, declaring, "We need to make sure we have reliable and credible information, by a preponderance of evidence. We could prove that the information was not credible before sending letters and even the Division of Elections has admitted substantial flaws. I did not feel we had credible information and told them I wouldn't send [any letters] until they could give me a better list."

When she ran for re-election in 2012, Bucher was challenged in the nonpartisan primary by Woodie McDuffie, the Mayor of Delray Beach, and Caneste Succe. She won re-election in a landslide, receiving 68% of the vote to McDuffie's 28% and Succe's 4%.

On January 18, 2019 Florida Governor Ron DeSantis suspended Bucher per executive Order.

== See also ==
- Brenda Snipes
- Miriam Oliphant

Florida House of Representatives
Preceded by Ed Healey	Member of the Florida House of Representatives from the 86th district April 25, 2000–November 19, 2002	Succeeded by Anne Gannon
Preceded by Anne Gannon	Member of the Florida House of Representatives from the 88th district November 19, 2002–November 18, 2008	Succeeded by Mark Pafford
