= Shevy Healey =

American psychologist

- Evelyn Finkel, later known as Shevy Healey, from the 1938 yearbook of the Philadelphia High School for Girls
- Born: Sewera Finkel; January 29, 1922; Poland
- Died: December 8, 2001 (aged 79)
- Other names: Evaline Finkel, Evelyn Finkel, Shevy Wallace
- Occupations: Psychologist, labor organizer, activist

Shevy Evelyn Wallace Healey (January 29, 1922 – December 8, 2001) born Sewera Finkel, was an American clinical psychologist, labor organizer, sleep researcher, and activist. She was a founding member of Old Lesbians Organizing for Change (OLOC).

== Early life and education ==
Healey was born in Poland and raised in Philadelphia, Pennsylvania, the daughter of Rose Spiegel Feldman. Her family was Jewish. She recalled her birth name being changed to "Evelyn" when she enrolled in an American kindergarten. She graduated from the Philadelphia High School for Girls in 1938. In 1976, she completed doctoral studies in psychology at Ohio State University, with a dissertation titled "The onset of chronic insomnia and the role of life-stress events".

== Career ==
Healey was a labor organizer in the 1940s, working for the Congress of International Organizations (CIO) in Los Angeles. She was a member of the Communist Party and of the NAACP of Los Angeles. She testified at the Tenney Committee hearing in 1946.

In the 1970s, Healey was a sleep researcher at the University of California, Los Angeles. In the 1980s, she was a clinical psychologist.

Healey was a founding member of Old Lesbians Organizing for Change (OLOC). "We name and proclaim ourselves as 'old'", she declared at the group's first West Coast conference in 1987. "We no longer wish to collude in our own oppression by accommodating to language that implies in any way that 'old' means inferior, ugly, or awful." In 1988, she appeared in Acting Our Age, a PBS documentary about women and aging. In 1992, she spoke at a conference on aging in the LGBT community. In 1998, she was a featured speaker at another national conference on aging issues in the LGBT community, at Fordham University. Arden Eversmeyer interviewed Healey for the Old Lesbian Oral Herstory Project. She appeared in the documentary No Secret Anymore: The Times of Del Martin & Phyllis Lyon (2003).

== Publications ==
=== Sleep research ===
- "Personality Patterns in Insomnia: Theoretical Implications" (1976, with A. Kales, A. B. Caldwell, T. A. Preston, and J. D. Kales)
- "Prevalence of sleep disorders in the Los Angeles metropolitan area" (1979, with E. O. Bixler, A. Kales, C. R. Soldatos, and J. D. Kales)
- "Onset of Insomnia: Role of Life-Stress Events" (1981, with A. Kales, L. J. Moroe, E. O. Bixler, K. Chamberlin, and C. R. Soldatos)

=== Age, Disability, and Sexuality ===
- "Growing to be an old woman: Aging and ageism" (1986)
- "An Unbreakable Circle of Women: Can We Create It? Age—Segregation, Privilege and the Politics of Inclusion" (1991)
- "NLC: Old Lesbians" (1991)
- "The Common Agenda Between Old Women, Women with Disabilities and All Women" (1993)
- "Confronting Ageism: A Must for Mental Health" (1993)
- "Diversity with a Difference: On Being Old and Lesbian" (1994)
- "Growing to be an Old Woman: Aging and Ageism" (1994)
- "RV Life Begins at Seventy" (1996)
- "One Old Lesbian's Perspective" (1999)
- "Ageism in OOB" (2000)

== Personal life ==
Finkel married twice, to Floyd L. Wallace in 1942, and to Don R. Healey, who was also once married to Dorothy Ray Healey. She had a daughter, Donna. Healey came out as a lesbian when she was 50. She died in 2001, at the age of 79. There is a box of her papers in the collection of the Southern California Library for Social Studies and Research.
