= Doc Kimmel =

American politician from Florida (1926–2022)

Bernard Kimmel
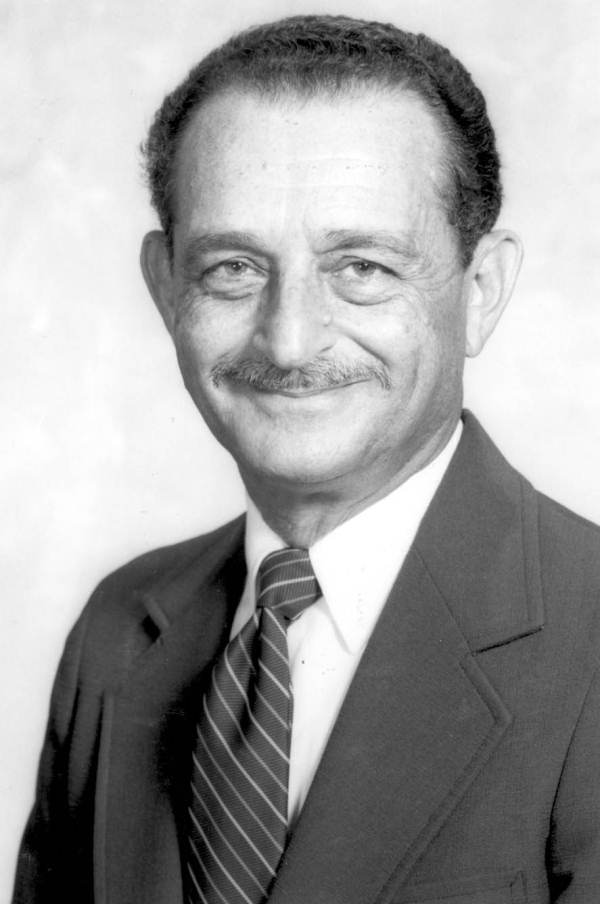

Member of the Florida House of Representatives from the 84th district
- In office November 6, 1984 – November 4, 1986
- Preceded by: Ed Healey
- Succeeded by: Ed Healey

Member of the Florida House of Representatives from the 82nd district
- In office November 4, 1980 – November 2, 1982
- Preceded by: Gene Campbell
- Succeeded by: Ed Healey (redistricting)

Personal details
- Born: November 18, 1926 Highland Park, Michigan, U.S.
- Died: November 2, 2022 (aged 95) West Palm Beach, Florida, U.S.
- Party: Republican
- Education: University of Michigan Medical School

Bernard Kimmel (November 18, 1926 – November 2, 2022) was an American physician and politician in the state of Florida.

Kimmel was born in Highland Park, Michigan. He attended Ohio Wesleyan University and the University of Michigan, earning a M.D. degree from the latter in 1956. He also served in the United States Navy during World War II in the Pacific Theater. He served in the Florida House of Representatives from 1980 to 1982 for District 82, and from 1984 to 1986, for District 84. He was a member of the Republican Party. He died on November 2, 2022, at the age of 95. He served on the board of Somerset Academy Inc., and the campus in Lake Worth, Florida was renamed for him in 2023.
