= Brenda Snipes =

American public official (1943–2023)

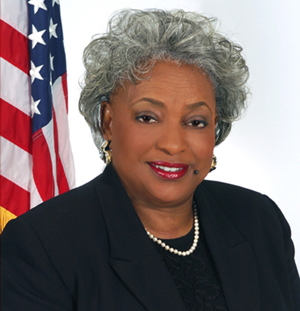

Broward County Supervisor of Elections
- In office November 20, 2003 – November 30, 2018
- Appointed by: Jeb Bush
- Preceded by: Miriam Oliphant
- Succeeded by: Peter Antonacci

Personal details
- Born: Brenda Calhoun; October 24, 1943 Talladega, Alabama, U.S.
- Died: November 2, 2023 (aged 80) Pembroke Park, Florida, U.S.
- Education: Talladega College (BA); Florida Atlantic University (MA); Nova Southeastern University (DEd)

Brenda Calhoun Snipes (October 24, 1943 – November 2, 2023) was an American public official who was the Supervisor of Elections for Broward County, Florida. She was appointed by Governor Jeb Bush in 2003. Snipes was registered as a Democrat.

On November 30, 2018, in the aftermath of the controversial 2018 Florida elections, Snipes was removed from office by Governor Rick Scott. In an official statement by Scott, he stated her suspension was due to her failure to maintain order within her office and complaints of malfeasance. Snipes held a press conference the following day, in which she stated that she rescinds her resignation and plans to fight her suspension.

On January 18, 2019, Governor Ron DeSantis voided his predecessor's suspension of Snipes and accepted her initial resignation, effective January 4, 2019.

== Early life and education ==
Snipes was born in Talladega, Alabama, on October 24, 1943. She majored in modern foreign languages at Talladega College. She moved to Florida in 1964 with her husband, Walter Snipes Jr.

Snipes graduated with a master's degree in curriculum and instruction for adults from Florida Atlantic University, and was awarded a doctorate in educational leadership from Nova Southeastern University.

== Career ==
=== Educator ===
In 1964, Snipes started her career as a teacher at Blanche Ely High School in Pompano Beach, Florida, and eventually became principal of Robert Markham Elementary School, also in Pompano Beach. She retired from teaching in June 2003.

=== As Supervisor of Elections ===
On November 20, 2003, Snipes was appointed supervisor of elections for Broward County by Governor Jeb Bush to take over from her predecessor, Miriam Oliphant, after Oliphant was removed from office for irregularities and fraud in the handling of ballots in the 2000 United States presidential election in that county. Snipes was re-elected to the position in 2004, 2008, 2012, and 2016.

==== 2004 general elections ====
In the 2004 general election, thousands of absentee ballots were lost in Broward County. County election officials said that approximately 58,000 absentee ballots were delivered to the Postal Service to be mailed to voters, but the Post Office claimed to have never received them.

Before the elections, Fair Elections International had requested permission to observe the elections in various counties in the United States, including Broward County.

==== 2012 elections ====
Close to 1,000 uncounted ballots were discovered a week after the election.

==== 2016 elections ====
Florida held its Democratic primary elections on August 30, 2016. Incumbent Debbie Wasserman Schultz ran against Tim Canova, an ally of Bernie Sanders, to become the Democratic nominee for the U.S. House of Representatives for Florida's 23rd Congressional District. A month before the election, Debbie Wasserman Schultz had been ousted from her position as the chairwoman of the Democratic National Committee over allegations that she and others rigged the Democratic presidential primary process to favor Hillary Clinton over Bernie Sanders.

Wasserman Schultz was declared the winner of the Florida primary election. She went on to win the general election and retain her seat as the Representative for the 23rd District.

After the 2016 general election, Snipes was unsuccessfully sued by a group pushing a medical marijuana ballot referendum after the question was left off of some ballots.

The election results were released 30 minutes before the polls closed. Florida State Law says “any supervisor of elections, deputy supervisor of elections, canvassing board member, election board member or election employee who releases the results of any election prior to the closing of the polls in that county on election day commits a felony of the third degree.” The law does not address the issue of intent, one way or the other. However, Broward County prosecutors declined to process, stating, "There is insufficient evidence that anyone purposely intended to post any elections results prior to the closing of the polls." When analysis showed that the results were statistically "implausible," documentary filmmaker Lulu Friesdat requested to examine ballots. Friedat made two requests in November 2016. She made a third request under Florida's Public Records Act (Government in the Sunshine Act) in March 2017. In June 2017, Canova and Friesdat made a joint request, but to no avail. That same month, Canova filed a lawsuit asking the courts to order Snipes to allow him to examine the ballots.

On September 1, 2017, while litigation was ongoing, Snipes signed an order authorizing the destruction of 688 boxes containing the ballots. Litigation on the matter continued for another two weeks. On November 6, 2017, the court discovered that the ballots in question had been destroyed two months prior. The judge ruled that Snipes had illegally destroyed the ballots and that Canova be awarded attorney's fees. Snipes' attorney said a vendor had made and retained a digital copy of every ballot cast in the race and that the destruction of the ballots was neither intentional nor illegal.

==== 2018 general elections ====
Elections were held on November 6, 2018, for the Governor of the State, Florida's U.S. Senator, and all of Florida's U.S. Representatives, as well as other seats.

Republican Ron DeSantis ran against Democrat Andrew Gillum, and was initially declared the winner. On November 17, Gillum conceded to DeSantis after the final recount, making DeSantis Governor-elect.

Florida's governor Rick Scott ran against incumbent Democratic Senator Bill Nelson for the U.S. Senate seat. Nelson eventually conceded to Scott after the recount.

During the August 2018 primary elections, a public polling location was moved inside a gated community. Voters complained that they were required to show their ID to security guards to get through the gates, despite the fact that ID is not required to vote in Florida. Voters were questioned, and some turned away. Complaints were lodged with Snipes' office at the time of the primary elections, but the situation was not resolved before the general elections. Snipes' assistant told a reporter that she (the assistant) was not aware of any complaints.

The Thursday following the election, a teacher found a box marked "provisional ballots" that had been left at a school used as a polling place. The teacher reported finding the box, but did not touch it or look inside. A county official later said the box contained voting equipment, not ballots. The Friday after the elections, the Canvassing Board found that the 205 provisional ballots were already counted. The Board also determined that 20 of the ballots were illegal due to mismatched signatures, however, since the votes were already processed, the illegal votes could not be distinguished from the legal votes and all 205 votes remained counted.

Florida law states that county election departments must release the total number of ballots counted within 30 minutes of poll closings to facilitate accountability and oversight. Six days after the election, the total number of ballots had not been reported. The Election Department is also expected to post the current tallies every 45 minutes after the polls close. By the Friday after the election, there was still no declared winner in the U.S. Senate race and votes were still being counted. As more votes were counted, they seemed to favor the Democratic nominee. Scott filed suit the Friday after the election, claiming that Broward County was violating the law. The judge ruled in Scott's favor, ordering Snipes to disclose the number of ballots cast in Tuesday’s midterm elections, broken down by absentee, early, and election day votes, as well as the number of ballots still to be counted by 7:00 p.m. that day. Snipes did not comply.

Florida requires an automatic machine recount when results are within 0.5%. By the weekend following the election, the tallies in the U.S. Senate race were so close that a machine recount was initiated.

After the election, current Governor and then U.S. Senate candidate Rick Scott asked the Florida Department of Law Enforcement to investigate. Scott asked for the investigation verbally. Because there was no formal written request filed, no investigation was initiated.

On November 18, 2018, almost two weeks after election day, Scott was declared the winner, officially becoming Senator-elect after Bill Nelson's concession.

==== Removal from office ====
On November 18, 2018, Snipes submitted her resignation, to be effective January 4, 2019, after Senator Bill Nelson conceded the Senate race the day before.

Florida Governor Rick Scott suspended Snipes on November 30, 2018. Scott's successor, Ron DeSantis, accepted her resignation in 2019. Peter Antonacci, president and CEO of the state’s business-recruitment agency Enterprise Florida, was appointed by Scott to serve the remainder of Snipes’ term, until a replacement could be chosen by voters in November 2020. Joe Scott was elected to fill the seat.

== Death ==
Snipes died in Pembroke Park, Florida, on November 2, 2023, at the age of 80. She was survived by her husband Walter, her daughter Derrice Snipes-Hakeem, two grandchildren, and two sons-in-law.

== See also ==
- Susan Bucher
- Miriam Oliphant
- 2018 United States Senate election in Florida
