= Anne Gannon =

American politician

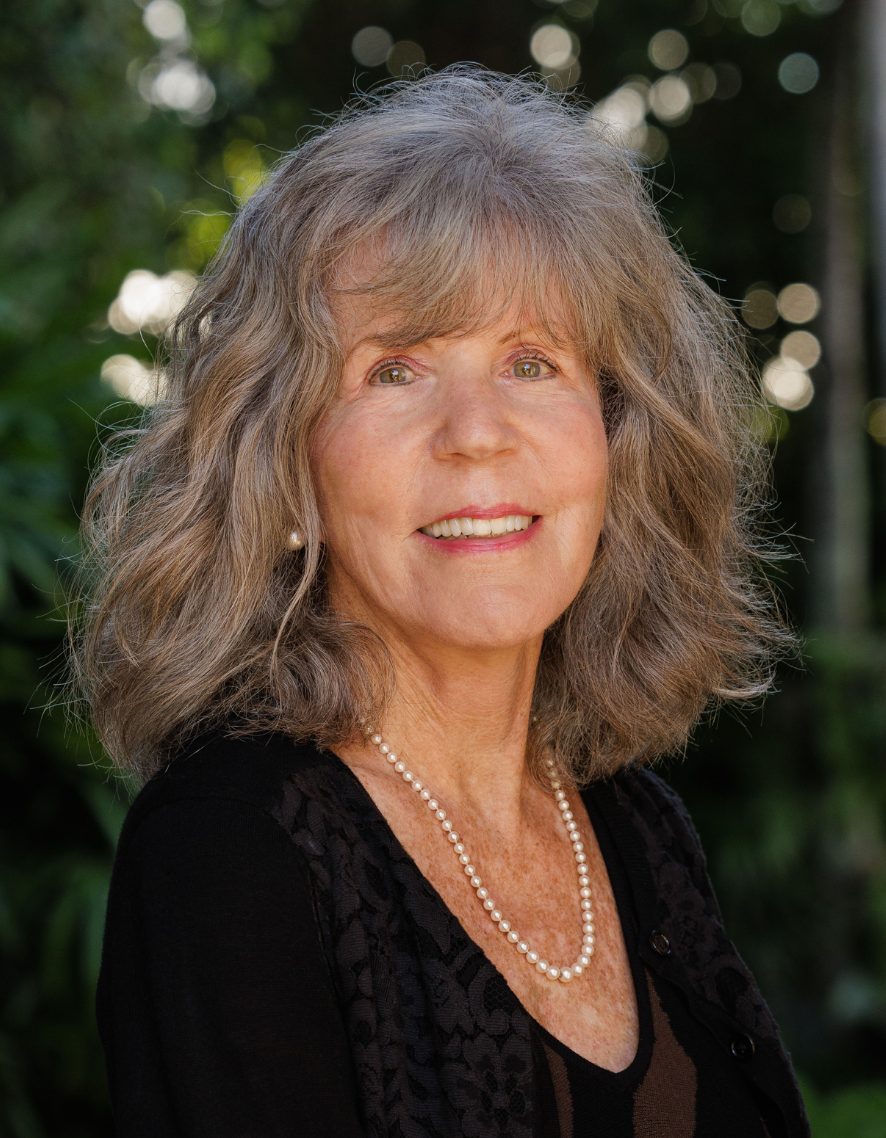

Tax Collector of Palm Beach County
- Incumbent
- Assumed office November 21, 2006
- Preceded by: Peter Carney

Member of the Florida House of Representatives
- In office November 7, 2000 – November 7, 2006
- Preceded by: Suzanne Jacobs
- Succeeded by: Maria Sachs
- Constituency: 70th District (2000–2002); 74th District (2002–2006)

Personal details
- Born: December 23, 1947 (age 78) Xenia, Ohio, U.S.
- Party: Democratic
- Spouse: James Whalen (deceased)
- Education: Mississippi Gulf Coast Community College; Palm Beach Community College; Barry University; Florida Atlantic University

Anne M. Gannon (born December 23, 1947) is a Democratic politician who currently serves as the Palm Beach County Tax Collector. Prior to her election as Tax Collector, she served as a member of the Florida House of Representatives, representing the 88th District from 2000 to 2002, and the 86th District from 2002 to 2006.

== History ==
Gannon was born in Xenia, Ohio, and grew up in Mechanicsburg, Ohio, where her father was the President of the Mechanicsburg School Board of Education. She attended Mississippi Gulf Coast Community College before moving to Florida in 1983, and then attended Palm Beach Community College, Barry University, and Florida Atlantic University, studying business administration and political science.

== Florida House of Representatives ==
When incumbent State Representative Suzanne Jacobs was unable to seek another term in 2000 due to term limits, Gannon ran to succeed her. In the Democratic primary, Gannon faced former State Representative Barry Silver, David Niven, Michele Nemo, and Doug Westcott. Gannon initially placed second in the initial primary, receiving 26% of the vote to Silver's 37%. However, because no candidate received a majority, a runoff election was held between Silver and Gannon. She ultimately emerged victorious, winning 52% of the vote to Silver's 48%. In the general election, she faced only independent candidate Stan Smilan, whom she defeated in a landslide with 85% of the vote. When she ran for re-election in 2002, Silver ran against her once again, and because no other candidates filed, the primary was open to all voters. Silver sued Gannon "for allegedly defaming his character in campaign literature she distributed" two years prior, while Gannon responded by sending out campaign literature "pointing out Silver's poor driving record" and calling him a "negative person." Gannon did not much face difficulty in winning renomination, which she did with 63% of the vote. She was re-elected without opposition in 2004.

== Palm Beach County Tax Collector ==
In 2006, Gannon initially planned to run for the Florida Senate to succeed Ron Klein, who was term-limited, but dropped out of the race to instead run for a fourth and final term in the state House. However, when John K. Clark, the Palm Beach County Tax Collector, resigned due to poor health, then-Governor Jeb Bush appointed Republican Peter Carney as Clark's interim replacement until a special election could be held. Gannon opted to run in the special election, campaigning on increasing efficiency within the office to improve performance, and defeated small business owner Randy Johnson in the Democratic primary with 70% of the vote. In the general election, she defeated Carney in a landslide, receiving over 60% of the vote.

Gannon was re-elected in 2008 without opposition, and in 2012, was challenged by Carney in the Democratic primary. Carney criticized Gannon for "long wait times for service" in the Tax Collector's office and for problems relating to the poor installation of new software to provide property data. Once again, Gannon defeated Carney in a rout, winning renomination with 87% of the vote. In the general election, she faced no major opposition and won re-election handily.

Florida House of Representatives
Preceded by Suzanne Jacobs	Member of the Florida House of Representatives from the 88th district 2000–2002	Succeeded by Susan Bucher
Preceded by Susan Bucher	Member of the Florida House of Representatives from the 86th district 2002–2006	Succeeded by Maria Sachs
