= Edward Healey =

Edward or Ed Healey may refer to:

- Ed Healey (1894–1978), American football player
- Edward Healey (architect) (fl. 1910s), British architect who worked in Thailand
- Edward Healey (New York politician) (1885–1945), American politician from New York
- Ed Healey (Florida politician) (1924–2000), American politician from Florida

== See also ==
- Edward Healy (1869–1954), New Zealand politician
