= Robert Healy =

Robert Healy is the name of:

- Rob Healy (Robert P. Healy; born 1964), private equity professional, military officer and American football player
- Robert Healy (artist) (1743–1771), Irish painter
- Robert Healy (journalist) (1925–2010), American political correspondent
- Robert W. Healy (born 1943), Cambridge, Massachusetts city manager
- Robert E. Healy (1883–1946), Vermont attorney and judge

== See also ==
- Robert Healey (disambiguation)
