= Mark Pafford =

American politician

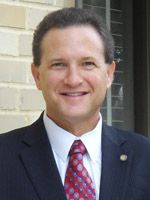

Member of the Florida House of Representatives
- In office November 4, 2008 – November 8, 2016
- Preceded by: Susan Bucher
- Succeeded by: Matt Willhite
- Constituency: 88th district (2008–2012); 86th district (2012–2016)

Personal details
- Born: April 11, 1966 (age 60) Miami-Dade County, Florida
- Party: Democratic
- Education: Florida International University (BA)
- Profession: Non Profit

Mark S. Pafford (born April 11, 1966) is an American politician who served as a Democratic member of the Florida House of Representatives, representing District 88 (2008–2012) and District 86 (2012–2016) which included Haverhill, Loxahatchee Groves, Royal Palm Beach, and Wellington in east-central Palm Beach County. Pafford's professional career includes work in the non-profit sector including stints with the ACLU, The Lord's Place, Area Agency on Aging, Arthur R. Marshall Foundation for the Everglades and CEO of Florida Community Health Action Information Network (CHAIN).

== History ==
Pafford is from unincorporated Miami-Dade County and attended North Miami High School (Hall of Fame), graduating in 1984. After high school, he was a student at Miami-Dade Community College, receiving his associate degree in 1986, and then at Florida International University, where he received a degree in public administration in 1988, minoring in Political Science. As a student he worked as a naturalist/interpretive guide at Arch Creek Park in North Miami. Pafford then worked for United States Congressman Lawrence J. Smith as a congressional aide from 1989 to 1992, and later worked for Florida House of Representatives State Representative Lois Frankel as a legislative assistant from 1996 to 1997.

== Florida House of Representatives ==
In 2002, when Frankel was unable to seek re-election in the Florida House of Representatives due to term limits, Pafford ran to succeed her in the 85th District, which stretched from Wellington to Lake Worth. He faced Shelley Vana, a teachers union president, in the Democratic primary, and narrowly lost to her, receiving 46% of the vote to her 54%. He lost an additional race in 2006 for Palm Beach County Commission to Jess Santamaria.

When Florida House of Representatives State Representative Susan Bucher was unable to seek re-election due to term limits in the 86th District, which stretched from Boynton Beach to Boca Raton in eastern Palm Beach County. He won the Democratic primary and the general election unopposed, winning his first term without any opponents. In 2010, he faced a challenge from Ron Miranda in the Democratic primary, who claimed that Pafford had an insufficiently pro-business voting record and criticized Pafford for his poor standing with Associated Industries of Florida. Pafford responded by calling attention to his voting record and observing that some of the votes that were considered to be votes against the business community were not, noting, "If you look at what I voted against, you'll find things like Senate Bill 6 on education, you'll find some of the Medicaid reform. It's a lot of the bills that group into that pro-business type of votes by the chamber that weren't necessarily business votes." He ended up defeating Miranda to win renomination, scoring 58% of the vote to Miranda's 42%, and advancing to the general election, where he faced only a write-in challenge and won re-election with 95% of the vote.

When the state's legislative districts were reapportioned in 2012, Pafford ran for re-election in the 86th District, which contained some of the territory that he had previously represented. He faced Tami Donnally, the Republican nominee and a business administrator, in the general election. Pafford earned the endorsement of The Palm Beach Post, which criticized Donnally and praised Pafford for his support for Medicaid expansion under the Patient Protection and Affordable Care Act and for his opposition to the law that required the closing of "the state's only tuberculosis sanatorium." Pafford ended up defeating Donnally with ease, receiving 60% of the vote to her 40% and winning his third term.

Though Florida House of Representatives State Representative Darryl Rouson was initially elected to serve as House Democrats' Minority Leader for the 2014-2016 legislative term, he was ousted by the Democratic Caucus. Pafford, in turn, ran for the position himself and defeated fellow State Representative Alan Williams to win the leadership position, by a vote of 29–12 vote. Pafford served as the Democratic Leader for the 2014-2016 legislative term.

Pafford most recently served (2016-2018) as a state board member for the League of Women Voters Florida. Additionally, he actively assisted the Gwen Graham Campaign for Florida Governor and numerous other local and state candidates seeking office.

Pafford attempts to bird and explore wild places throughout Florida and the rest of the US as time and reality permit.

Florida House of Representatives
Preceded by Susan Bucher	Member of the Florida House of Representatives from the 88th district November 4, 2008 – November 6, 2012	Succeeded by Bobby Powell
Preceded by Lori Berman	Member of the Florida House of Representatives from the 86th district November 6, 2012 – November 8, 2016	Succeeded by Matt Willhite
