= Suzanne Jacobs =

American politician (1936–2020)

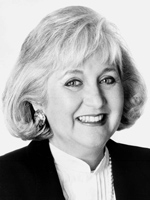

Member of the Florida House of Representatives from the 88th district
- In office November 3, 1992 – November 7, 2000
- Preceded by: Jack N. Tobin (redistricting)
- Succeeded by: Anne Gannon

Personal details
- Born: July 6, 1936 Chicago, Illinois, U.S.
- Died: March 18, 2020 (aged 83)
- Party: Democratic
- Children: Natalie Eisner, Hilary Shenfield
- Education: University of California, Berkeley (B.A.); National College of Education (M.S. Ed.); Vanderbilt University

Suzanne Jacobs (July 6, 1936 – March 18, 2020) was an American Democratic politician who served as a member of the Florida House of Representatives from 1992 to 2000.

== Early life and career ==
Jacobs was born in Chicago, Illinois. She attended the University of California at Berkeley, receiving her bachelor's degree in 1958. She worked as an educator afterwards, and received her master of science in education from the National College of Education in 1972. Jacobs worked at Oakton Community College from 1977 to 1983 as the manager of cooperative education, and moved to Florida in 1983. Jacobs served as the President of the National Organization for Women chapter in south Palm Beach County, and worked as a legislative aide to State Representative Steve Press.

== Florida House of Representatives ==
In 1992, Jacobs announced that she would run for the State House, though there was initially uncertainty around which districts would be drawn in Palm Beach County, and which incumbents would run where. Jacobs ultimately opted to run in the 88th District, which included Delray Beach, Lake Worth, Lantana, and western Boynton Beach. She faced lobbyist Anne Gannon and former Delray Beach City Commissioner Jimmy Weatherspoon in the Democratic primary.

Jacobs placed first in the primary, winning 49 percent of the vote to Gannon's 31 percent and Weatherspoon's 20 percent, but because no candidate won a majority, a runoff election took place.

Jacobs led in the runoff election by 22 votes, but Gannon refused to concede, and instead waited for an automatic recount to take place. After the recount narrowed Jacobs's margin to 21 votes, Gannon sought a partial hand recount, which affirmed Jacob's victory. Gannon sought to contest the result, arguing that the Supervisor of Elections gave her incorrect mailing labels for her campaign literature, which caused her to send information to voters outside of the district and missed 64 voters inside the district. Gannon ultimately dropped her challenge and conceded the race.

Jacobs proceeded to the general election, where she faced Republican nominee Curt Mondell, a paving contractor who had been arrested for domestic violence earlier in the year. Though the state Republican Party targeted the race, Jacobs won in a landslide, receiving 62 percent of the vote.

In 1994, Jacobs ran for re-election for a second term and faced a rematch in the Democratic primary with Gannon. In a close race, Jacobs narrowly defeated Gannon, winning 51 percent of the vote to Gannon's 49 percent. In the general election, Jacobs was challenged by attorney Carl Cascio, the Republican nominee. Jacobs won re-election in a landslide, winning 63–37 percent over Cascio.

Jacobs ran for re-election to a third term in 1996, and was challenged by independent candidate Thomas Widom. She defeated Widom with 75 percent of the vote. In 1998, Jacobs was challenged in the Democratic primary by attorney Chris Anstead, the son of Florida Supreme Court Justice Harry Anstead, and Palm Beach County Democratic Party Chairman Greg Nicosia. Jacobs won renomination by a wide margin, receiving 65 percent of the vote to Anstead's 23 percent and Nicosia's 12 percent, and won her fourth term automatically, because no other candidates filed.

Jacobs was term-limited in 2000 and could not run for re-election to a fifth term.

Jacobs died on March 18, 2020, at the age of 83.

== Post-legislative career ==
In 2003, Jacobs announced that she would challenge County Commissioner Burt Aaronson in the Democratic primary when he ran for re-election in 2004, but withdrew from the race on May 27, 2004.
