= Joseph T. Higgins =

American lawyer and politician

Joseph Thomas Higgins (October 20, 1890 – August 30, 1980) was an American lawyer and politician from New York City. He serve five terms in the New York State Assembly.

== Early life ==
Higgins was born on October 20, 1890, in Worcester, Massachusetts, the son of Jeremiah J. Higgins and Mary A. Donahue. His father, the son of an Irish immigrant, was president of the Home Cooperative Bank as well as president and treasurer of several real estate and building firms.

Higgins attended Worcester schools. He then went to the College of the Holy Cross, graduating from there with a Bachelor of Arts in 1916. He went to Fordham University School of Law in the fall of that year. He did one-year's study there, and in 1917, during World War I, he enlisted at Plattsburg training camp. He was commissioned first lieutenant of the Aviation Section, U.S. Signal Corps. He served in air bases all over the country and was in France as a pursuit pilot. He was honorably discharged in 1919.

Higgins then returned to Fordham and studied law there until 1921. A noted college athlete, 1917 and 1918 he was the New England intercollegiate one half-mile and 600 yard champion and a member of the Irish American Athletic Club of New York City and the American team at the Inter-Allied Games in Paris.

== Career ==
Higgins was admitted to the bar in 1921. By 1928, he served as deputy relief commissioner, New York State Veterans Relief Bureau for the 14th Assembly District. He was also a member of the Thomas M. Farley Association, Regular Democratic Association, 14th Assembly District.

In 1927, Higgins was elected to the New York State Assembly as a Democrat, representing the New York County 14th District. He served in the Assembly in 1928, 1929, 1930, 1931, and 1932. In 1932, he was the Democratic candidate for Sheriff of New York County to succeed Thomas M. Harley, who was removed from office by Governor Franklin D. Roosevelt and was the leader of Higgins' assembly district. He was elected dheriff that year and finished Harley's term, serving until the end of 1934.

In January 1935, now-President Roosevelt appointed Higgins Collector of Internal Revenue in the Third New York District. Higgins was a friend of Roosevelt, and the appointment was made with the recommendation of Tammany Hall leader James J. Dooling. The appointment was confirmed by the United States Senate Committee on Finance few days later. He was an alternate delegate to the 1936 Democratic National Convention. He resigned as Collector in 1943 to run as the Democratic candidate for the City Court. He ran against Republican and American Labor Party candidate Francis E. Rivers. He lost the election, after which he went into private practice with the law firm Higgins, Brenner & Higgins. He specialized in tax law. He retired in 1970.

== Personal life ==
Higgins was a member of the National Democratic Club, the New York Athletic Club, the American Legion, the Benevolent and Protective Order of Elks, the Improved Order of Red Men, the Knights of Columbus, the Dalcassian Boat Club, and the First Avenue Boys.

By the end of his life, Higgins was married to Eleanor Farley and resided at Hampton Bays. He died from heart disease at Southampton Hospital on August 30, 1980.

New York State Assembly
Preceded by Frederick L. Hackenburg	New York State Assembly; New York County, 14th District; 1928–1932	Succeeded by Edward V. Loughlin
