= David Clark (Florida politician) =

American politician

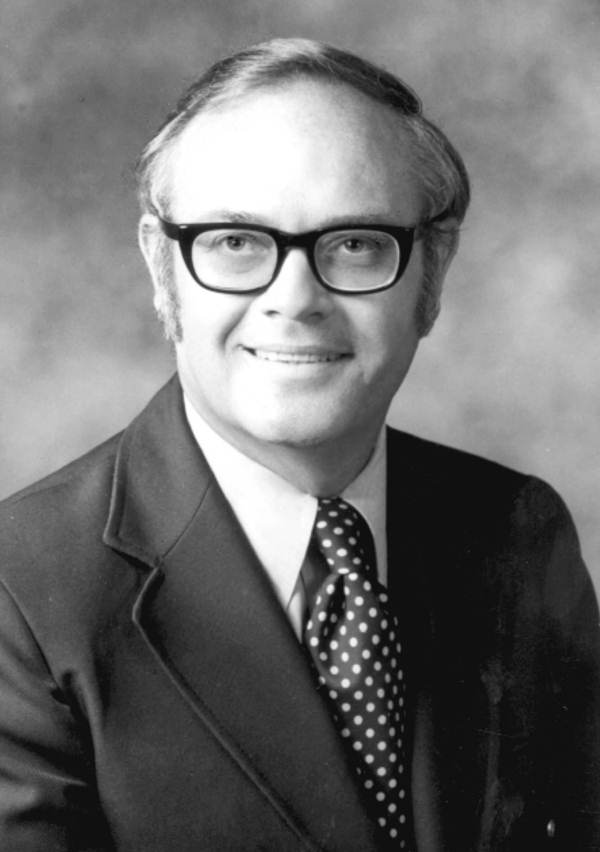
- Clark in 1972

Member of the Florida House of Representatives from the 81st district
- In office November 5, 1968 – November 5, 1974
- Preceded by: Bill James
- Succeeded by: Ed Healey

Personal details
- Born: August 14, 1926 Bad Axe, Michigan
- Died: December 24, 2015 (aged 89) Palm Beach, Florida
- Party: Republican
- Occupation: attorney

David Crosby Clark, Jr. (August 14, 1926 – December 24, 2015) was an American politician and attorney in the state of Florida.

Clark was born in Bad Axe, Michigan. He attended Central Michigan University and Stetson University Law School, becoming an attorney. He served in the Florida House of Representatives from 1968 to 1974, representing district 81. Clark also served on the North Palm Beach, Florida village council and as judge of the Palm Beach County Court. He was a member of the Republican party. He died in 2015.
