= Delores Hogan Johnson =

American politician from Florida

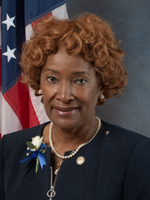

Member of the Florida House of Representatives from the 84th district
- In office November 6, 2018 – November 3, 2020
- Preceded by: Larry Lee Jr.
- Succeeded by: Dana Trabulsy

Personal details
- Born: November 3, 1949 (age 76)
- Party: Democratic

Delores Hogan Johnson (born November 3, 1949) is an American politician from Florida. A Democrat, she served one term in the Florida House of Representatives, representing the 84th district in St. Lucie County from 2018 to 2020.

== Legislative career ==
Johnson was elected to the House in 2018, defeating Republican Mark Gotz by a margin of 51.4–48.6%.

In 2020, Johnson lost reelection to Republican Dana Trabulsy, who won by 53.0–47.0%.
