= Larry Lee Jr. =

American politician

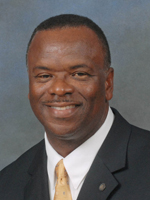

Member of the Florida House of Representatives from the 84th district
- In office November 6, 2012 – November 6, 2018
- Preceded by: Redistricted
- Succeeded by: Delores Hogan Johnson

Personal details
- Born: October 20, 1953 (age 72) Statesboro, Georgia
- Party: Democratic
- Spouse: Alice Lee
- Children: LaTasha Lee
- Education: Livingstone College (B.S.)
- Profession: Insurance agent

Larry Lee Jr. (born October 20, 1953) is a Democratic politician and a former member of the Florida House of Representatives, representing the 84th District, which includes eastern St. Lucie County, from 2012 to 2018.

== History ==
Lee was born in Statesboro, Georgia, and later moved to the state of Florida, where he graduated from Fort Pierce Central High School in 1972, and then attended Livingstone College in Salisbury, North Carolina, where he graduated with a degree in health and physical education in 1976. Following graduation, he moved back to Florida and worked as an insurance agent, eventually starting a small business that provides State Farm Insurance.

== Florida House of Representatives ==
In 2012, after the Florida House of Representatives districts were redrawn, Lee opted to run in the newly created 84th District. He faced State Representative Adam Fetterman and teacher Kevin Stinnette in the Democratic primary, whom he was able to defeat with 53% of the vote. In the general election, Lee faced Michelle Miller, the Republican nominee. Though the race was hotly contested, he emphasized the need for a positive campaign, declaring, "I think my opponent is a wonderful person, and that's all I'd like to say about her," emphasizing the fact that the two were friends. Throughout the course of the campaign, Lee outraised Miller, raising $170,000, nearly twice what Miller raised in her campaign. He campaigned on his history of working with people of both parties, emphasizing that he would do it in the legislature, noting, "All this partisanship and bickering has got to cease." Ultimately, Lee defeated Miller with 52% of the vote, winning his first term in the House.

During his time in the legislature, Lee worked with State Senator Joe Negron to protect the Indian River Lagoon, working with Negron to try to secure $230 million to protect the region, and joined Speaker of the Florida House of Representatives Will Weatherford and Negron when they toured the Lagoon and Lake Okeechobee to see how the United States Army Corps of Engineers releases polluted water runoff from the Lake into the canals leading to the Lagoon. Additionally, Lee sponsored legislation that aimed to promote youth literacy in two- and three-year-olds, arguing, "Literacy is the key to all learning. If a child can't read, then their chance of succeeding in life and graduating from high school decreases dramatically. This bill gives them a jump start in the area of literacy."
