= Robert Healey =

Robert Healey may refer to:

- Robert Healey (cricketer) (born 1934), English right-handed batsman
- Robert Healey (politician), member of the New Hampshire House of Representatives
- Robert J. Healey (1957–2016), American businessman and political candidate from Rhode Island
- Robert Healey, American labor union leader, headed Chicago Federation of Labor

== See also ==
- Robert Healy (disambiguation)
- Healey (surname)
