= Ed Healey (Florida politician) =

American politician (1924–2000)

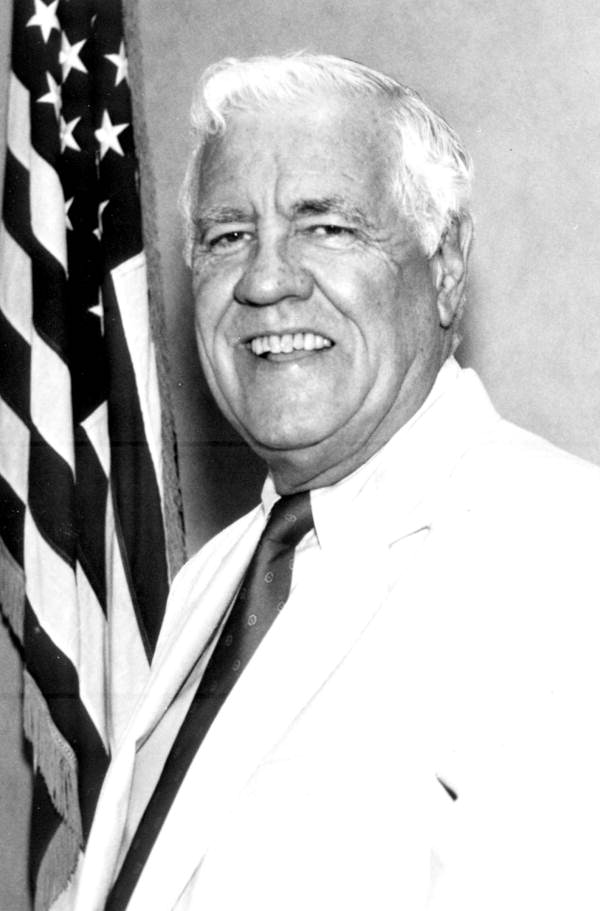

Member of the Florida House of Representatives
- In office November 4, 1986 – March 16, 2000
- Preceded by: Doc Kimmel
- Succeeded by: Susan Bucher
- Constituency: 84th district (1986–1992); 86th district (1992–2000)

Member of the Florida House of Representatives from the 84th district
- In office November 2, 1982 – November 6, 1984
- Preceded by: Doc Kimmel
- Succeeded by: Doc Kimmel

Member of the Florida House of Representatives from the 81st district
- In office November 5, 1974 – November 4, 1980
- Preceded by: David Clark
- Succeeded by: Reid Moore Jr.

Personal details
- Born: July 26, 1924 Elmhurst, Queens, New York City, New York
- Died: March 16, 2000 (aged 75) Tallahassee, Florida
- Party: Democratic
- Spouse: Maureen
- Children: 3
- Education: Washington and Jefferson College
- Occupation: Financial consultant
- Awards: Purple Heart

Military service
- Allegiance: United States
- Branch/service: United States Army
- Years of service: 1942–1945
- Unit: 82nd Airborne Division

Edward J. Healey (July 26, 1924 – March 16, 2000) was a Democratic politician from Florida who served as a member of the Florida House of Representatives from 1974 to 1980, from 1982 to 1984, and from 1986 until his death in 2000.

== Early life ==
Healey was born in Queens in New York City in 1924, and served in the 82nd Airborne Division of the U.S. Army during World War II, earning a Purple Heart. Healey ran track and played tennis and basketball at Washington and Jefferson College, and moved to Florida in 1957, working as a financial consultant.

== Florida House of Representatives ==
In 1972, Healey ran for the Florida House of Representatives from the newly created 82nd district. He faced Jay Reynolds, the Republican nominee, in the general election, He lost to Reynolds by a wide margin, receiving 40 percent of the vote to Reynolds's 60 percent.

Healey ran for the legislature again in 1974, challenging Republican State Representative David Clark in the 81st district. He narrowly unseated Clark in the general election, winning 51 percent of the vote to Clark's 49 percent. He won re-election in 1976, defeating Republican Blitz Robinson with 54 percent of the vote. Healey defeated Republican Bob Nichols in 1978 by a narrower margin, winning re-election with 51 percent of the vote.

In 1980, Healey ran for re-election to a fourth term. He was initially set to face Ron Giddens, a physician, but after Giddens dropped out of the race, Governor Bob Graham declined to reopen filing and Healey appeared to win re-election unopposed. After the Republican Party of Florida sued, the Florida Supreme Court reopened filing. Former State Representative Reid Moore Jr. won the Republican primary over former State Representative John W. Jordan, and faced Healey in the general election. Moore ultimately defeated Healey, winning 54 percent of the vote to his 46 percent.

Following redistricting, Healey opted to challenge Republican State Representative Doc Kimmel in the 84th district. He narrowly unseated Kimmel, winning 51 percent of the vote to his 49 percent. In 1984, Kimmel ran against Healey, and defeated him, winning 53 percent of the vote to Healey's 47 percent. Healey challenged Kimmel for re-election in 1986, and won the general election with 51 percent of the vote.

In 1988, Healey ran for re-election, and was challenged by Republican Cliff Clarke, a motel owner. He won re-election over Clarke by a wide margin, receiving 62 percent of the vote to Clarke's 38 percent. In 1990, Healey was challenged by Fred Joss, an administrator with the Palm Beach County Public Defender's office, and defeated him with 59 percent of the vote.

Healey ran for re-election in 1992 in the 86th district following redistricting, and won unopposed. In 1994, former State Representative Lois Frankel, who left the legislature in 1992 to run for Congress, planned on challenging Healey for renomination, but ultimately decided to run in a neighboring district. Healey instead faced Republican Scott McCracken, a craftsman, in the general election. He won re-election in a landslide, receiving 67 percent of the vote. Healey was re-elected unopposed in 1996 and 1998.

In 2000, after voter-approved term limits came into effect, Healey was barred from seeking re-election.

== Death ==
Healey died on March 16, 2000, after suffering a brain hemorrhage several days earlier.
