= Frederick L. Hackenburg =

American lawyer and politician

Frederick Lincoln Hackenburg
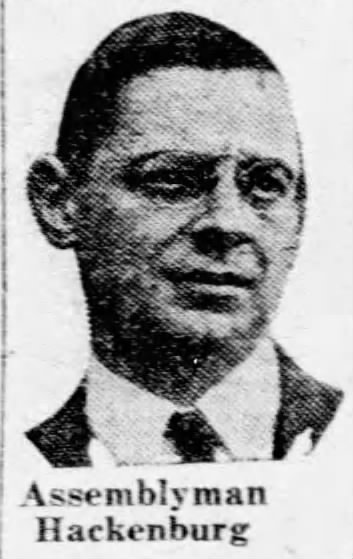
- 1926 newspaper photo of Hackenburg

Member of the New York House of Representatives from the 14th district
- In office January 1, 1921 – December 31, 1927
- Preceded by: Edward Healey
- Succeeded by: Joseph T. Higgins

Personal details
- Born: March 27, 1887 Prague, Bohemia, Austria-Hungary
- Died: January 10, 1952 (aged 64) West Brighton, New York, U.S.
- Party: Democratic
- Spouse: Julia
- Children: 2
- Education: New York Law School

Frederick Lincoln Hackenburg (March 27, 1887 – January 10, 1952) was a Czech-American lawyer, politician, judge, and author.

== Life ==
Hackenburg was born on March 27, 1887, in Prague, Bohemia, Austria-Hungary, the son of Zikmund Hachenburg. He immigrated to America in 1904, settling in New York City, New York. He became an American citizen in 1910. He grew up on the Lower East Side.

Hackenburg graduated from New York Law School, after which he began practicing in New York City and had an office at 261 Broadway. Connected with the Lenox Hill Settlement since 1907, he was president of the Intersettlement Debating League and counsel for the Lenox Hill Tenants' Association. In 1920, he was elected to the New York State Assembly as a Democrat, representing the New York County 14th District. He served in the Assembly in 1921, 1922, 1923, 1924, 1925, 1926, and 1927. He was a member of the State Industrial Survey Commission from 1926 to 1927. He became well known for his liberal perspective in the Assembly, fighting for a revision of labor laws and the "oppressive Sabbath laws" and seeking to do away with "bootlegging in child labor." His efforts won the support of the Citizens Union and the friendship of future Mayor Fiorello La Guardia.

Hackenburg was La Guardia's first judicial appointment, receiving the appointment on La Guardia's first day as mayor. He was appointed to the Special Sessions Court to fill the expired term of Justice William T. Fetherson. He previously broke from Tammany Hall and supported La Guardia, serving as a behind-the-scenes director for his mayoral campaign. In 1935, La Guardia named him one of the nine members of the New York City Charter Revision Commission, whose report a year later became the basis for the restructuring of the New York City government. As Justice, he did a year and a half study of 7,500 paternity cases brought before the Special Sessions Court, which helped bring order to those cases and made him the court's specialist in that field. He was reappointed to the Court in 1944, and he continued to serve as Justice until the day he died.

A book and art collector, Hackenburg wrote two books: The Solitary Parade, which talked about his break with Sheriff Thomas M. Farley, and This Best Possible World, a 1934 novel about the rise of four New York State Assemblymen. He was a close friend of Czechoslovak President Tomáš Masaryk. Hackenburg was also member of the New York County Lawyers' Association and the New York State Bar Association.

== Personal life ==
Hackenburg's wife's name was Julia, and his children were Frederick Jr. and Mrs. Janice Flath. His son Frederick became associated with his law practice, Hackenburg & Schwartz.

Hackenburg died at his home in West Brighton, Staten Island on January 10, 1952. He was buried in the Moravian Cemetery in New Dorp.

New York State Assembly
Preceded by Edward Healey	New York State Assembly; New York County, 14th District; 1921–1927	Succeeded by Joseph T. Higgins
