= Dana Trabulsy =

American politician

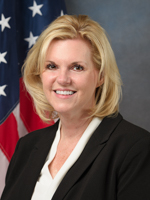

Member of the Florida House of Representatives from the 84th district
- Incumbent
- Assumed office November 3, 2020
- Preceded by: Delores Hogan Johnson

Personal details
- Born: March 31, 1964 (age 62)
- Party: Republican
- Spouse: Paul Trabulsy

Dana Trabulsy (born March 31, 1964) is an American politician serving as a member of the Florida House of Representatives from the 84th district. She assumed office on November 3, 2020. She lives in Fort Pierce, Florida. She is a Republican.

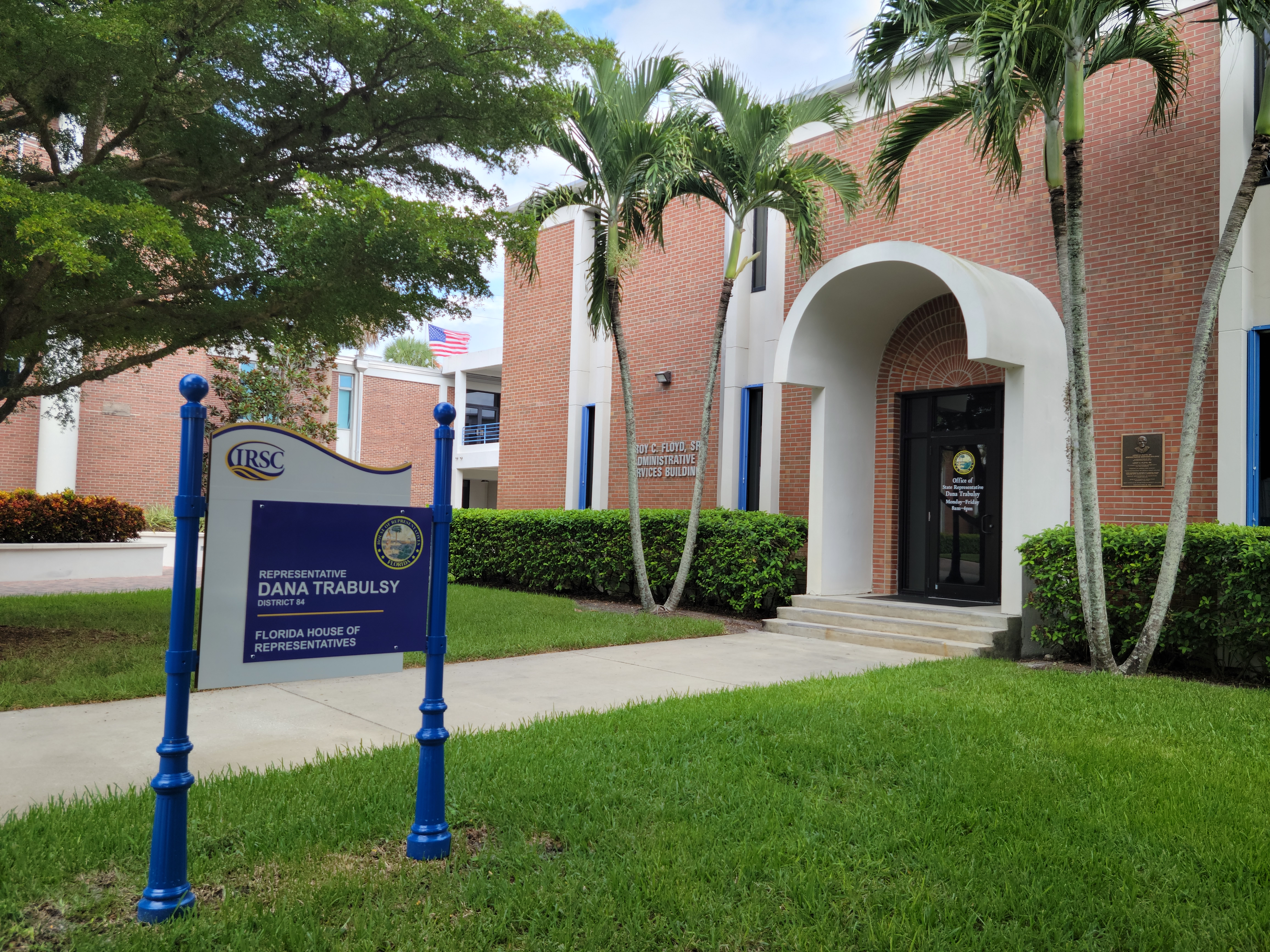
Trabulsy's office is located in the Leroy C. Floyd Administrative Services Building at the Massey campus of Indian River State College in Fort Pierce.
