= Matt Willhite =

American politician from Florida

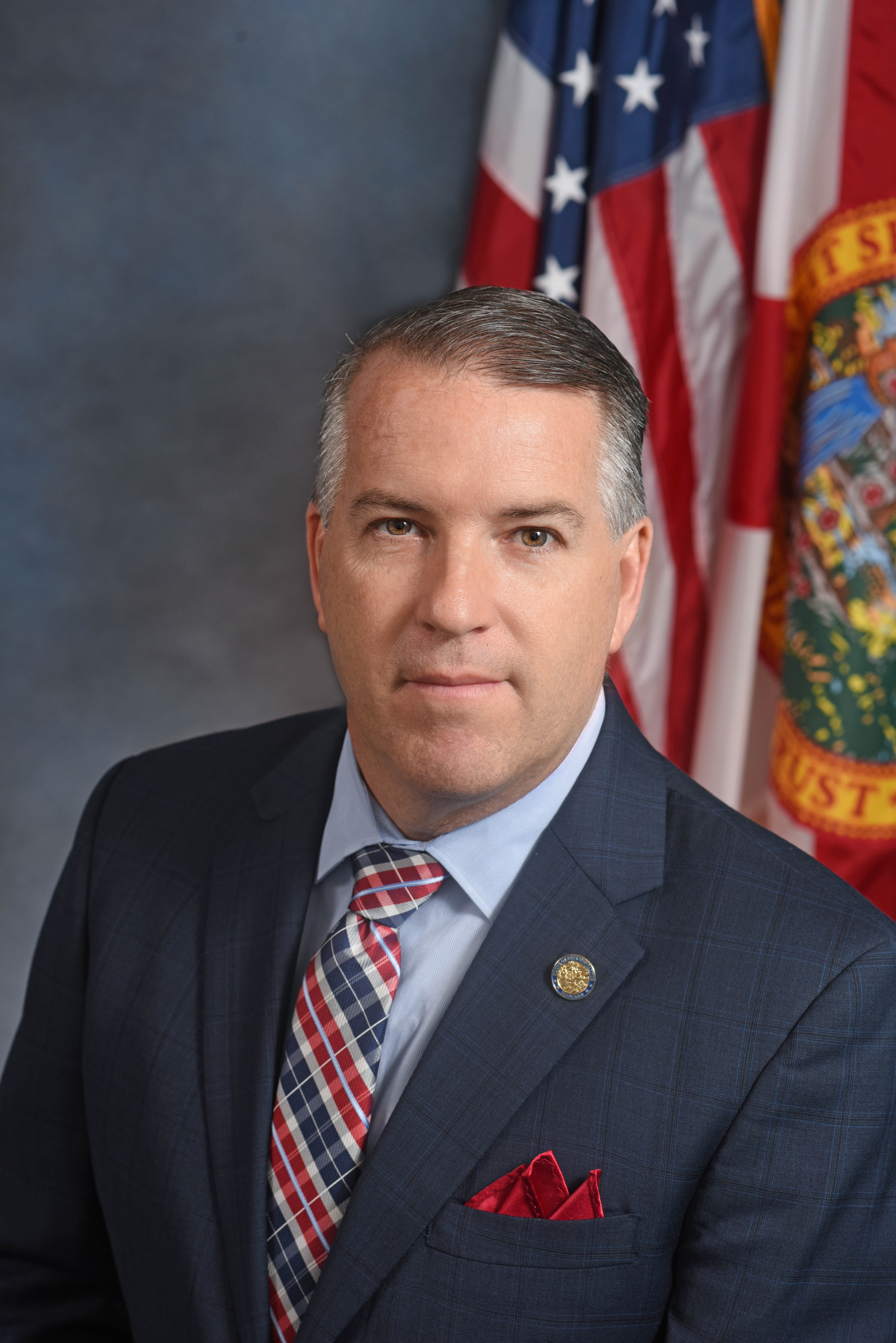

Member of the Florida House of Representatives from the 86th district
- In office November 8, 2016 – November 8, 2022
- Preceded by: Mark Pafford
- Succeeded by: John Snyder

Personal details
- Born: July 23, 1971 (age 55) Pontiac, Michigan, US
- Party: Democratic
- Spouse: Alexis Willhite
- Children: 2
- Education: Palm Beach State College (A.S.)
- Profession: Fire captain

Matt Willhite (born July 23, 1971) is a Democratic politician from Florida who served as a member of the Florida House of Representatives from 2016 to 2022. He represented the 86th District, which includes Greenacres, Haverhill, Loxahatchee Groves, Royal Palm Beach, Wellington and parts of unincorporated Palm Beach County. Willhite worked as a Captain for Palm Beach County Fire Rescue until his retirement in 2024, making him the first active duty first responder to have served in the history of the Florida Legislature.

== History ==
Matt Willhite was born in Pontiac, Michigan and moved to Palm Beach County, Florida, in 1980 at the age of 9. He graduated from Lake Worth High School. In 1999, Willhite enlisted in the United States Navy and served 8 years as a Corpsman, serving with the 4th ANGLICO of the United States Marine Corps.

== Florida House of Representatives ==
When incumbent State Representative Mark Pafford was unable to seek re-election in 2016 due to term limits, Willhite ran to succeed him in the 86th District, which included Haverhill, Loxahatchee Groves, Royal Palm Beach, Wellington, and parts of Greenacres and West Palm Beach.

Willhite faced Tinu Pena in the Democratic primary. He placed first in the primary, winning 56.29% of the vote. Willhite then went on to defeat Republican challenger Laurel Bennett, with 57.59% of the vote. In 2017 Matt Willhite helped revive the non-partisan Veteran's caucus in the Florida Legislature and was elected chair.

Willhite was reelected in the November 6, 2018 general election, again defeating Bennett, this time with 59.82% of the vote.

During his second year in office, Willhite was elected as Vice Chair of the Palm Beach County Legislative Delegation, a group on 13 lawmakers who represent districts in Palm Beach County. In 2018, Willhite was elected as Chair of the Legislative Delegation.
