= Jess Healey =

Canadian ice hockey player (born 1996)

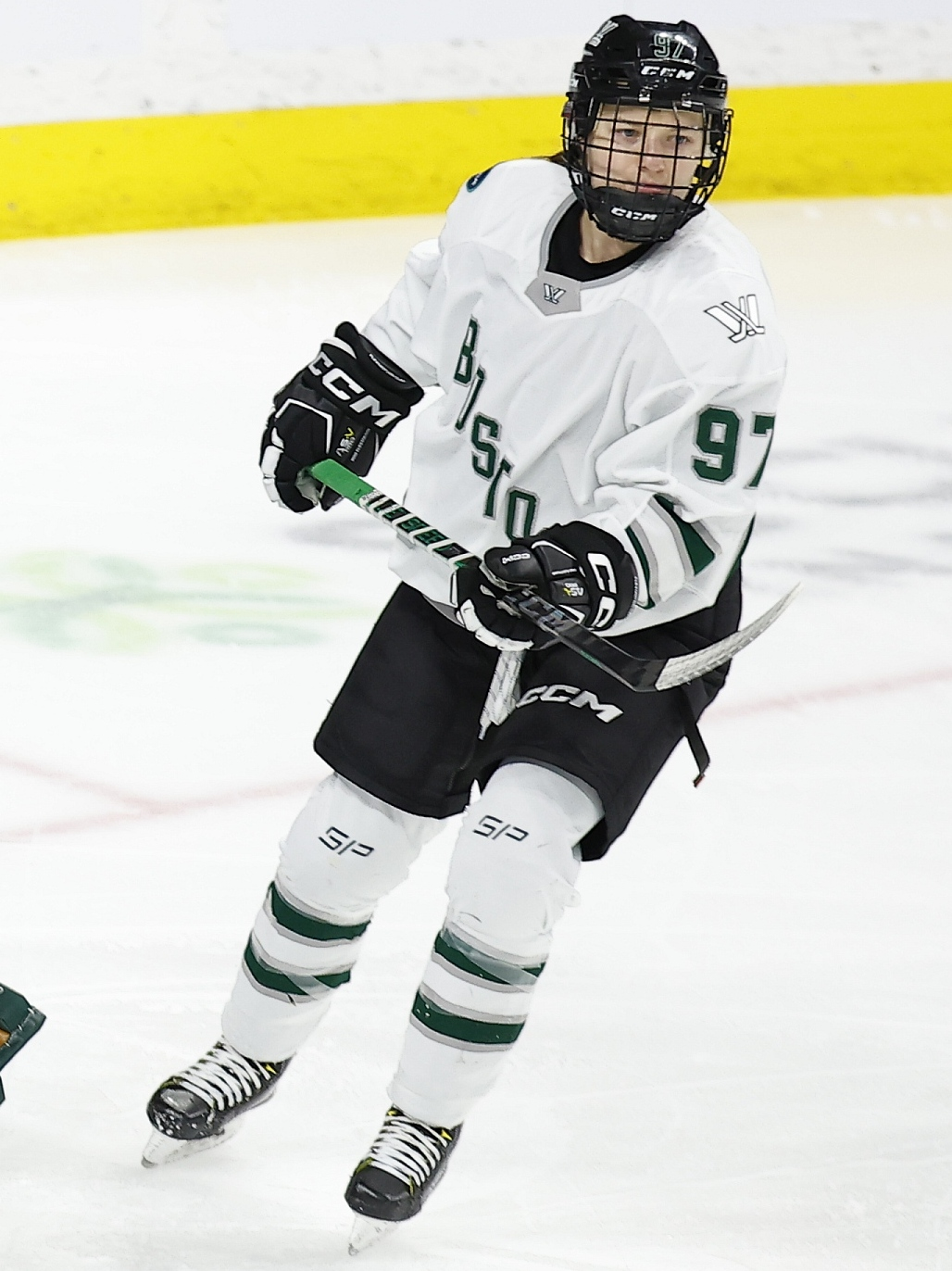
- Healey with PWHL Boston in 2024
- Born: October 14, 1996 (age 30) Edmonton, Alberta, Canada
- Height: 5 ft 4 in (163 cm)
- Weight: 146 lb (66 kg; 10 st 6 lb)
- Position: Defence
- Shot: Left
- Played for: PWHL Boston; HV71; Buffalo Beauts
- Playing career: 2014–2024

Jessica Jane Healey (born October 14, 1996) is a Canadian former professional ice hockey defenceman who most recently played for PWHL Boston of the Professional Women's Hockey League (PWHL). She previously played for the Buffalo Beauts of the Premier Hockey Federation (PHF) and HV71 of the Swedish Women's Hockey League (SDHL).

== College career ==
Healey began her college ice hockey career with the Minnesota Duluth Bulldogs women's ice hockey program during the 2014–15 season. During her freshman year, she recorded two goals and one assist in 36 games. During the 2015–16 season, her sophomore year, she recorded two goals and five assists in 35 games. During the 2016–17 season, in her junior year, she recorded two goals and four assists in 35 games. During the 2017–18 season, in her senior year, she recorded a career-high five goals and nine assists in 35 games.

== Professional career ==
Following her collegiate career, Healey joined HV71 of the SDHL. During the 2018–19 season, in her first professional season, she recorded eight goals and 20 assists in 36 regular season games. During the 2019–20 season, she served as captain of HV71 and recorded six goals and 19 assists in 34 regular season games and two goals and two assists in six playoff games. During the 2020–21 season, she recorded seven goals and 19 assists in 35 regular season games and two goals and one assist in five playoff games. During her time with HV71 she recorded 21 goals and 58 assists in 105 games.

In May 2022, she signed a two-year contract with the Buffalo Beauts of the PHF. During the 2021–22 season, in her first season with the Beauts, she recorded one goal and six assists in 24 games.

On September 18, 2023, Healey was drafted in the fifteenth round, 87th overall, by PWHL Boston in the 2023 PWHL Draft. On November 3, 2023, she signed a one-year contract with Boston. During the 2023–24 season, she recorded one goal and two assists in 22 regular season games. During the first game of the Walter Cup playoffs, she scored the game-winning goal. In June 2024, Healey announced her retirement.

== International play ==
Medal record

Representing Canada

World U18 Championship
Gold medal – first place	2014 Hungary	

Healey represented O'Brien represented Canada at the 2014 IIHF World Women's U18 Championship where she recorded one goal and one assists in five games and won a gold medal.

== Personal life ==
Healey was born to Tim and Pam Healey and has a brother, Josh. Josh is also a professional ice hockey player. Her grandfather, Rich Healey, is a former professional ice hockey player who played one NHL game for the Detroit Red Wings.

She married her longtime girlfriend Stephanie Eliuk in 2024.

== Career statistics ==
=== Regular season and playoffs ===
			Regular season					Playoffs
Season	Team	League	GP	G	A	Pts	PIM	GP	G	A	Pts	PIM
2014–15	Minnesota Duluth Bulldogs	WCHA	36	2	1	3	24	—	—	—	—	—
2015–16	Minnesota Duluth Bulldogs	WCHA	35	2	5	7	20	—	—	—	—	—
2016–17	Minnesota Duluth Bulldogs	WCHA	35	2	4	6	18	—	—	—	—	—
2017–18	Minnesota Duluth Bulldogs	WCHA	35	5	9	14	10	—	—	—	—	—
2018–19	HV71	SDHL	36	8	20	28	26	7	0	1	1	4
2019–20	HV71	SDHL	34	6	19	25	18	6	2	2	4	12
2020–21	HV71	SDHL	35	7	19	26	50	5	2	1	3	4
2022–23	Buffalo Beauts	PHF	24	1	6	7	19	—	—	—	—	—
2023–24	PWHL Boston	PWHL	22	1	2	3	8	8	1	0	1	0
NCAA totals			141	11	19	30	72	—	—	—	—	—
SDHL totals			105	21	58	79	94	18	4	4	8	20

=== International ===
Year	Team	Event	Result	GP	G	A	Pts	PIM
2014	Canada	U18	1st place, gold medalist(s)	5	1	1	2	0
Junior totals				5	1	1	2	0
