= Joseph G. Healey =

American academic and priest (born 1938)

Father Joseph Healey
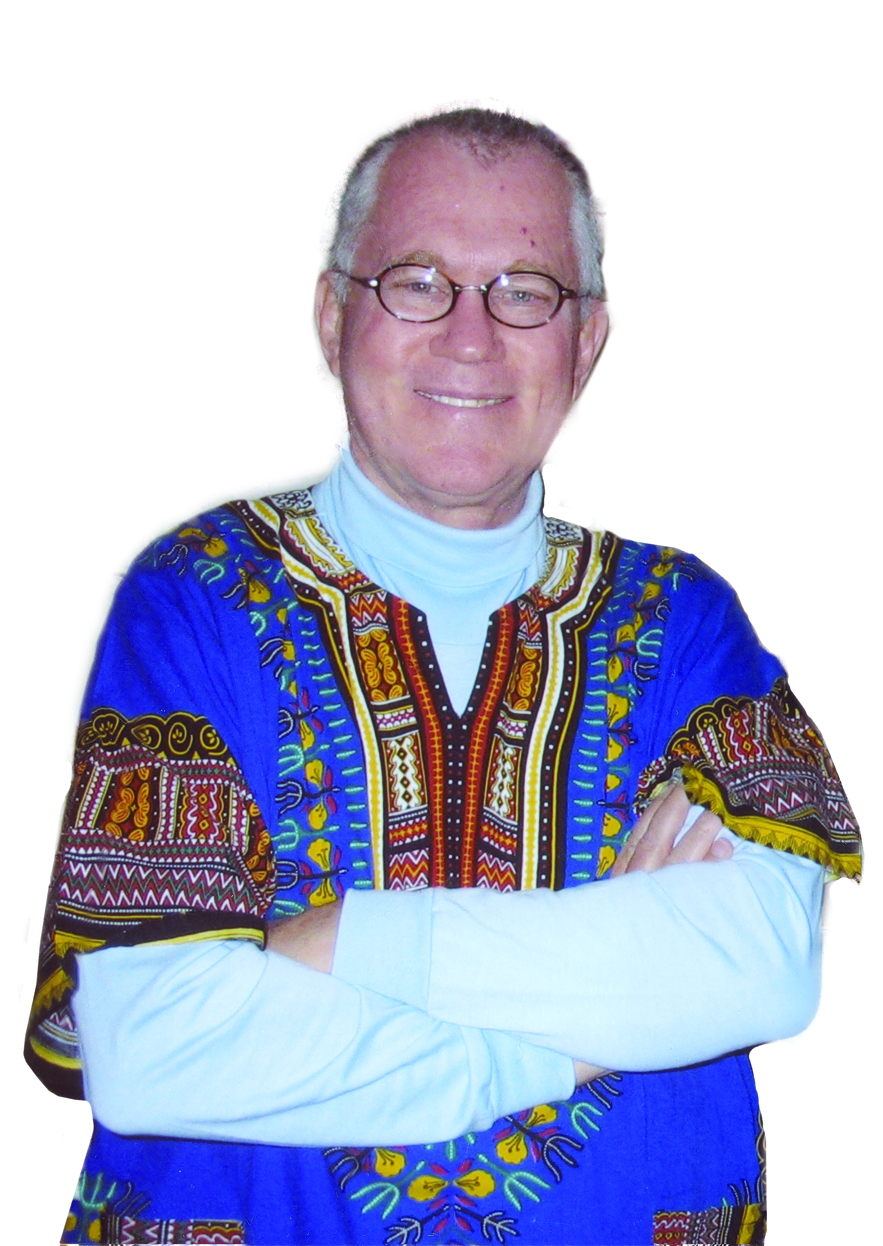
- Born: April 29, 1938 (age 88); Detroit, Michigan
- Education: Princeton University
- Known for: African Proverbs, Sayings and Stories
- Awards: Pro Ecclesia et Pontifice
- Scientific career
- Fields: Proverbs/Folklore; SCCs; & Communications
- Workplaces: Maryknoll Africa

Joseph Graham Healey (born April 29, 1938) is an American academic who specializes in Small Christian Communities (also known as Basic ecclesial community) as a teacher, researcher, and writer. Father Healey is a communications specialist with experience in the United States and Eastern Africa.

== Early life ==
Healey was born in Detroit, Michigan on April 29, 1938. His grandfather was horse trainer T.J. Healey and his mother was a homemaker. He attended Maryknoll Seminary, graduating with a B.A. in 1961. In 1966 he graduated with a masters of theology from the University of Missouri. In 1981 he received a further graduate degree from Creighton University. Healey is the brother of Thomas J. Healey.

== Missionary work ==
In 1968, Healey became a Maryknoll missionary priest, relocating to East Africa and becoming the leader of the social communications office of the Association of Member Episcopal Conferences in Eastern Africa. While in Africa, Healey recorded the traditional proverbs of cultures including Sukumu of Tanzania—trying to demonstrate how the use of these proverbs could be used for evangelizing methods. His written collections also include his experiences from his missionary expeditions, and highlights the spiritual tradition of the areas he has taken up residence in. In describing his work Mary Ann Brussat wrote that, “The reader will find material on creation, life, family, community, good times and bad times, joy and celebration, cultural matters, and seeds of God in African soil.” He remained in East Africa for the duration of his career, developing and writing about small Christian communities within areas dominated by alternate religions. He has also worked with members of other faiths as an author and evangelist. In his analysis of African faith stories, Healey has called them a “fifth gospel”, a controversial phrase that describes the use of faith stories for expressing Christian ideas to those of a non-Christian background. Much of his written work has tried to establish a model of evangelizing in Africa that can be followed by other missionaries. Communities where Healey has worked include Nairobi, Kenya, as well as Rulenge, Musoma, and Dar es Salaam, Tanzania. In Tanzania he has also served as the Mission Awareness Committee of the Catholic Men Religious Superiors' Association. Additional nations he has worked in include Uganda and Zambia.

== Other work ==
In 1968 he founded the Social Communications Office of the Association of the Catholic Bishops Conferences in Eastern Africa, and in 1969 he was the press secretary for the Pope’s visit to Uganda. Between 1979 and 1982, Healey then served as the Spiritual Director of the Maryknoll School of Theology.

== Recognition ==
In 1969 Healey received the Pro Ecclesia Papal Medal of the Vatican. In 2013 Healey then received the Msgr. Thomas A, Keissler Award from RENEW International. In the journal Proverbium, the "International Bibliography of New and Reprinted Proverb Collections" was dedicated to Healey.

== Boards and committees ==
Father Healey has served as the appointed Chairperson of the Communications Sub-committee of the Cardinal Otunga Beatification Process. He has also served as the moderator of the African Proverbs Working Group.

== Books ==
- A Fifth Gospel: The Experience of Black Christian Values (Maryknoll, NY: Orbis Books, 1981)
- Kuishi lnjili—Living the Gospel (Peramiho, Tanzania: Benedictine Publications, 1982)
- Kueneza Injili Kwa Methali—Preaching the Gospel Through Proverbs (Peramiho, Tanzania: Benedictine Publications, 1984)
- What Language Does God Speak: African Stories About Christmas and Easter (Nairobi, Kenya: St. Paul Publications, 1989)
- Kugundua Mbegu za Injili—Discovering Seeds of the Gospel (Peramiho, Tanzania: Benedictine Publications, 1993)
- Je, Mungu Anasema Lugha Gani? (Peramiho, Tanzania: Benedictine Publications, 1993)
- Towards An African Narrative Theology (first printed in 1996 and now in the following editions: Maryknoll, NY: Orbis Books, 12th Printing 2013 and Nairobi, Kenya: Paulines Publications Africa, 5th Reprint 2012) Print & eBook
- Once Upon a Time in Africa: Stories of Wisdom and Joy (Maryknoll, NY: Orbis Books, 2004) It was selected as one of The Best Spiritual Books of 2004 by Spirituality & Health Magazine Award. Print & eBook
- African Stories for Preachers and Teachers (Nairobi, Kenya: Paulines Publications Africa, 2005)
- Small Christian Communities Today: Capturing the New Moment (edited with Jeanne Hinton) (Maryknoll, NY: Orbis Books, 2005) Print & eBook
- Building the Church as Family of God: Evaluation of Small Christian Communities in Eastern Africa (Eldoret, Kenya: AMECEA Gaba Publications – CUEA Press, 2012).
- Sagesse Africaine: Histories vraies, Mythes et Contes; translated into French by Alain Babunga (Kinshasa, DRC: Editions Paulines, 2012)
- Reconciliation, Justice and Peace – the Second African Synod (Maryknoll, NY: Orbis Books, 2012) See chapter titled Small Christian Communities: Promoters of Reconciliation, Justice and Peace in Eastern Africa
- Small Christian Communities/Basic Ecclesial Communities: Theology of One World (Freiburg, Germany: Herder, 2012) See chapter titled Historical Development of the Small Christian Communities/Basic Ecclesial Communities in Africa
- Building the Church as Family of God: Evaluation of Small Christian Communities in Eastern Africa (2013)

== See also ==
- Pro Ecclesia et Pontifice The Cross of Honour
- T. J. Healey Thoroughbred Horse Trainer
- Thomas J. Healey
- Graham-Paige Grandson of Joseph B Graham
