= Old Lesbian Oral Herstory Project =

American oral history project

Old Lesbian Oral Herstory Project at Sophia Smith Collection of Women's History
- Location: Northampton, Massachusetts, U.S.
- Established: 1998

Collection
- Items collected: Interview transcripts, audio recordings (cassette tapes and digital files); correspondence, releases, photographs; biographical material, writings, speeches, memorabilia.
- Size: More than 500 oral histories.

Other information
- Parent organization: Smith College
- Website: OLOHP (Official); Smith College Libraries

The Old Lesbian Oral Herstory Project (OLOHP) is a collection of interviews that document the lives of lesbians, especially those born in the first half of the 1900s.

== History and mission ==
The project was created in 1998 by Arden Eversmeyer, then a retired public school teacher and counselor and a lesbian community activist in Houston. Eversmeyer was inspired to gather these oral histories when she observed lesbian friends who had been born in the 1920s and 1930s passing away and became concerned that their life stories would never be shared.

The OLOHP is focused on interviewing lesbians age 70 and older. The interviewees come from a variety of backgrounds and places, most, but not all, within the United States. OLOHP volunteers ask the interviewees about their upbringing, their families, and their adult lives. The project explains: "Some women do talk about sex, but many don't. We don't ask, but neither do we discourage it… if a woman opts to share about that aspect of her life, that is her choice. We are very interested in learning how she feels being a lesbian has affected her life."

== Project results ==
Project volunteers have collected over 750 stories from women around the world.

OLOHP has published two books of its oral histories: A Gift of Age: Old Lesbian Life Stories (2009) and Without Apology: Old Lesbian Life Stories (2012).

Transcripts, audio recordings, photographs, and other materials from OLOHP are archived at the Sophia Smith Collection of Women's History at the Smith College Libraries in Northampton, Massachusetts.
