= Arden Eversmeyer =

American LGBT rights activist

- Born: April 4, 1932; Stevens Point, Wisconsin
- Died: November 14, 2022 (aged 90); Houston, Texas
- Education: Sam Houston State University
- Occupations: Public school teacher and counselor
- Organization(s): Lesbians Over Age Fifty (LOAF), Old Lesbian Oral Herstory Project (OLOHP)
- Known for: Lesbian community activism

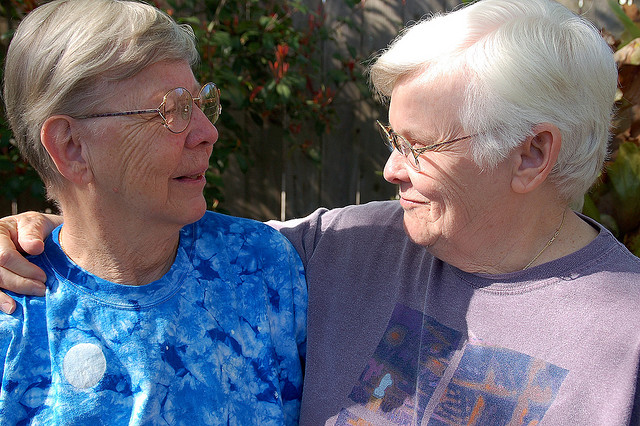
Arden Eversmeyer and Charlotte Avery in 2007 in Houston, Texas

Jean Arden Eversmeyer, known as Arden Eversmeyer (April 4, 1931 – November 14, 2022), founded the organizations Lesbians Over Age Fifty (LOAF) and Old Lesbian Oral Herstory Project (OLOHP) to give older lesbians visibility and a sense of community and to document their stories.

== Early life ==
Born to Herbert and Audrey Eversmeyer in Stevens Point, Wisconsin, on April 4, 1931, Eversmeyer graduated from Texas State College for Women with a bachelor's degree in health and physical education in 1951. In 1964, she completed a master's degree in education from Sam Houston State University.

== Career and community activism ==
Eversmeyer worked in Texas public schools, starting in Plano and spending the majority of her career with the Pasadena Independent School District and Houston Independent School District, both as an educator and counselor. After a 30-year career, she retired in 1981.

In 1952, she met her first partner, Tommie Russum.

After Russum's death in 1985, Eversmeyer became involved in community activism focused on lesbians. She started the organization Lesbians Over Age Fifty in 1987 to create safe meeting places and a social network for mid-life and older lesbians in Houston. For 14 years, Eversmeyer served on the steering committee of Old Lesbians Organizing for Change, a national organization for lesbians age 55 and older working to confront ageism and promote social justice.

In 1987, Eversmeyer became a partner to Charlotte Avery, and they married in 2008. Avery died on April 4, 2018.

In 1998, Eversmeyer founded the Old Lesbian Oral Herstory Project, which conducts interviews with lesbians age 70 and older to capture their personal stories and document the life of lesbians in the 20th century. Project volunteers have collected over 800 stories from women around the world. OLOHP has published two books of oral histories: A Gift of Age: Old Lesbian Life Stories (2009) and Without Apology: Old Lesbian Life Stories (2012). Transcripts, audio recordings, photographs, and other materials from OLOHP are archived at the Sophia Smith Collection of Women's History at the Smith College Libraries in Northampton, Massachusetts.

Arden's work with OLOHP was the subject of a documentary short film called Old Lesbians, directed and edited by Meghan McDonough in 2023. Old Lesbians received the Audible/Aesthetica Listening Pitch and was commissioned by The Guardian.

For six years, Eversmeyer was a mayoral appointee to the Houston Agency on Aging.

== Later life and death ==
In 2014, the National Women's History Alliance, a nonprofit educational organization, named Eversmeyer one of its Women of Character, Courage and Commitment honorees for her work on the Old Lesbian Oral Herstory Project.

Mary Speegle, creator of the podcast The Lesbian Story Project, combined two interviews with Eversmeyer into a 45-minute episode published on October 17, 2016.

Eversmeyer died in Houston on November 14, 2022.
