= Timothy J. Healey =

American mathematician

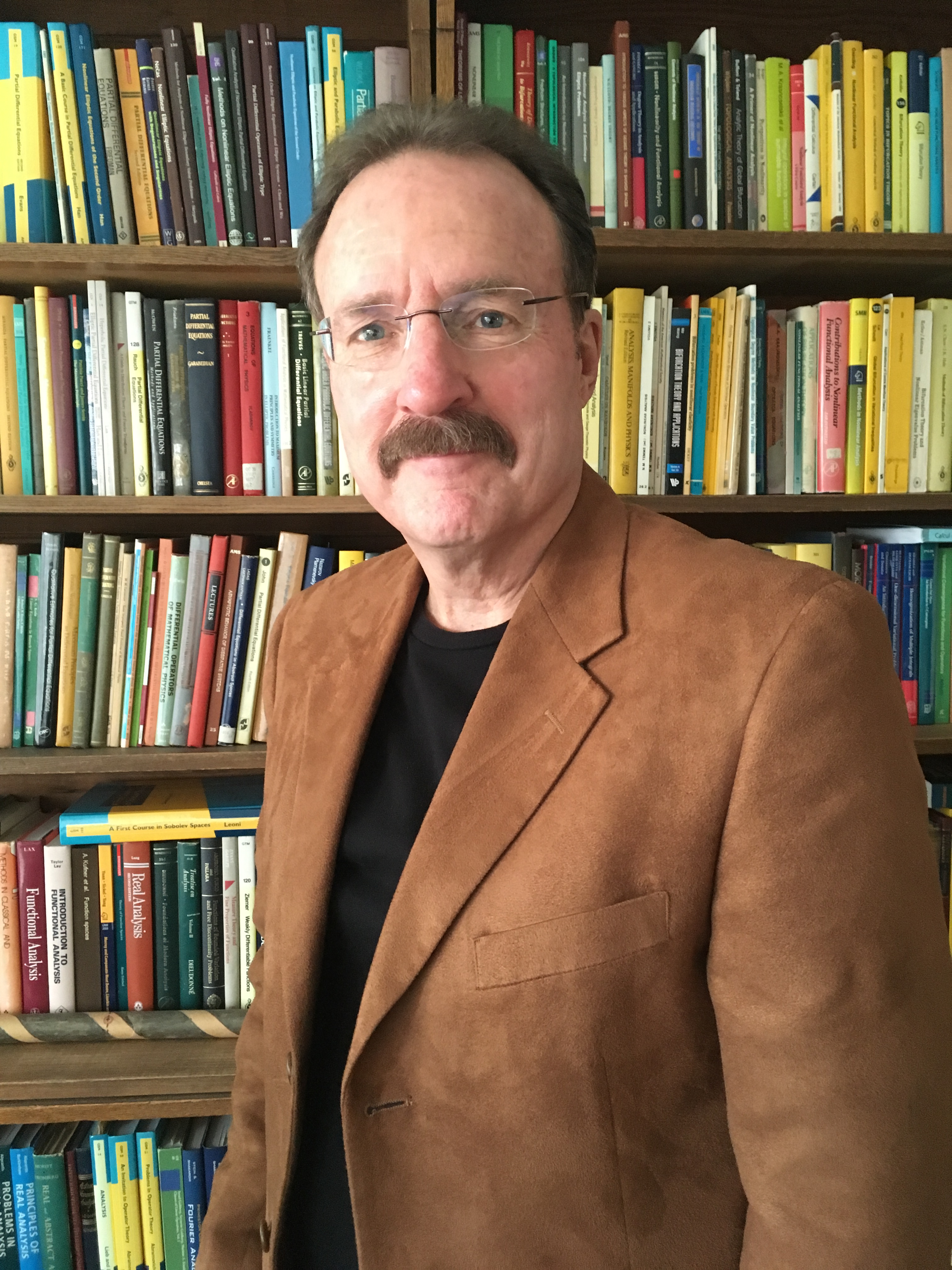
- Education: University of Illinois
- Scientific career
- Fields: Mathematics, Continuum Mechanics
- Workplaces: Cornell University; University of Maryland
- Thesis: Symmetry, Bifurcation, and Computational Methods in Nonlinear Structural Mechanics (1985)
- Doctoral advisor: Robert Muncaster

Timothy Healey is an American applied mathematician working in the areas of nolinear elasticity, nonlinear partial differential equations, bifurcation theory and the calculus of variations. He is currently a professor in the Department of Mathematics, Cornell University.

Healey is known for his mathematical contributions to nonlinear elasticity particularly the use of group-theoretic methods in global bifurcation problems.

== Education and career ==
Healey received his bachelor's degree in engineering from the University of Missouri in 1976 and worked as a structural engineer between 1978 and 1980. He received his PhD in engineering from the University of Illinois at Urbana-Champaign in 1985 under the guidance of Robert Muncaster in mathematics with mentoring from Donald Carlson and Arthur Robinson in mechanics. He spent a postdoctoral year with Stuart Antman and P. Michael Fitzpatrick at the University of Maryland before joining the faculty at Cornell University, where he has held full-time positions in the Department of Theoretical and Applied Mechanics, Mechanical and Aerospace engineering and Mathematics. He has served as PhD advisor to 21 students, with 37 descendants.

== Research ==
Healey's research focuses on mathematical aspects of elasticity theory. Early in his career, he made fundamental contributions to the study of global bifurcation problems with symmetry using group-theoretic methods, including work with H. Kielhöfer on the preservation of nodal properties in solutions of nonlinear elliptic PDE. Along with many co-workers, his approach based on symmetry and global bifurcation/continuation has illuminated the behavior of a wide variety of physical systems, including rod structures, lipid-bilayer vesicles, phase transitions, wrinkling in thin sheets, creasing in soft solids, and brittle fracture. With H. Simpson, he developed a topological degree similar to the Leray-Schauder degree, yielding new existence theorems in nonlinear elasticity. Healey's work on transverse hemitropy and isotropy in Cosserat rod theory is well known and provides a natural setting for studying the mechanics of ropes, cables and biological filaments such as DNA. He has also established minimum-energy existence theorems for thin, nonlinearly elastic shells undergoing large membrane strains.

== Recognition ==
- A Tribute to Timothy Healey's 70th Birthday: IUTAM Symposium Global Bifurcation/Continuation in Nonlinear Elasticity, Modeling, Analysis and Computation, Paris, France 2026
- Honorary Professorship at the Department of Morphology and Geometric Modeling, Budapest University of Technology and Economics
- Invited speaker, Midwest Mechanics Seminar 2011
- Silla Sanford Visiting Professor of Mathematics, Universidad de Los Andes, Bogota, Colombia, 2009–2010
- Distinguished Visiting Professor, Département de Méchanique, École Polytechnique, France, 2016–2017
