= Rich Healey =

Canadian ice hockey player

- Born: March 12, 1938 (age 88) Vancouver, British Columbia, Canada
- Height: 5 ft 10 in (178 cm)
- Weight: 170 lb (77 kg; 12 st 2 lb)
- Position: Defence
- Shot: Left
- Played for: Detroit Red Wings
- Playing career: 1959–1970

Richard Thomas Healey (born March 12, 1938) is a Canadian former professional ice hockey defenceman who played one game in the National Hockey League with the Detroit Red Wings during the 1960–61 season, on January 4, 1961, against the Toronto Maple Leafs. The rest of his career, which lasted from 1959 to 1970, was spent in various minor leagues.

== Personal life ==
Healey's grandchildren, Josh and Jess, are both professional ice hockey players.

== Career statistics ==
=== Regular season and playoffs ===
| | | | Regular season | | | | | Playoffs |
| Season | Team | League | GP | G | A | Pts | PIM | GP | G | A | Pts | PIM |
|---|---|---|---|---|---|---|---|---|---|---|---|---|
| 1955–56 | Edmonton Oil Kings | WCJHL | 35 | 3 | 9 | 12 | 69 | 6 | 0 | 0 | 0 | 6 |
| 1956–57 | Edmonton Oil Kings | CAHL | — | — | — | — | — | — | — | — | — | — |
| 1956–57 | Edmonton Oil Kings | M-Cup | — | — | — | — | — | 6 | 0 | 1 | 1 | 6 |
| 1957–58 | Red Deer Rustlers | CAHL | — | — | — | — | — | — | — | — | — | — |
| 1957–58 | Edmonton Oil Kings | M-Cup | — | — | — | — | — | 4 | 1 | 0 | 1 | 4 |
| 1958–59 | Red Deer Rustlers | CAHL | — | — | — | — | — | — | — | — | — | — |
| 1959–60 | Sudbury Wolves | EPHL | 66 | 1 | 10 | 11 | 75 | 12 | 0 | 3 | 3 | 8 |
| 1960–61 | Hershey Bears | AHL | 16 | 0 | 2 | 2 | 6 | 7 | 1 | 0 | 1 | 2 |
| 1960–61 | Sudbury Wolves | EPHL | 30 | 1 | 8 | 9 | 35 | — | — | — | — | — |
| 1960–61 | Edmonton Flyers | WHL | 10 | 0 | 0 | 0 | 11 | — | — | — | — | — |
| 1960–61 | Detroit Red Wings | NHL | 1 | 0 | 0 | 0 | 2 | — | — | — | — | — |
| 1961–62 | Sault Thunderbirds | EPHL | 61 | 2 | 22 | 24 | 68 | — | — | — | — | — |
| 1962–63 | Edmonton Flyers | WHL | 2 | 0 | 1 | 1 | 0 | — | — | — | — | — |
| 1963–64 | Lacombe Rockets | CAHL | — | — | — | — | — | 5 | 2 | 4 | 6 | 6 |
| 1964–65 | Lacombe Rockets | CAHL | — | — | — | — | — | — | — | — | — | — |
| 1965–66 | Lacombe Rockets | ASHL | 22 | 6 | 8 | 14 | 36 | 4 | 3 | 1 | 4 | 0 |
| 1966–67 | Edmonton Nuggets | WCSHL | 17 | 1 | 2 | 3 | 24 | — | — | — | — | — |
| 1967–68 | Vermillion Tigers | AIHA | — | — | — | — | — | — | — | — | — | — |
| 1968–69 | Edmonton Monarchs | ASHL | — | 3 | 35 | 38 | 37 | — | — | — | — | — |
| 1969–70 | Edmonton Monarchs | ASHL | — | — | — | — | — | — | — | — | — | — |
| EPHL totals | | | 157 | 4 | 40 | 44 | 178 | 12 | 0 | 3 | 3 | 8 |
| NHL totals | | | 1 | 0 | 0 | 0 | 2 | — | — | — | — | — |

== See also ==
- List of players who played only one game in the NHL
