= Adam Healey =

American businessman

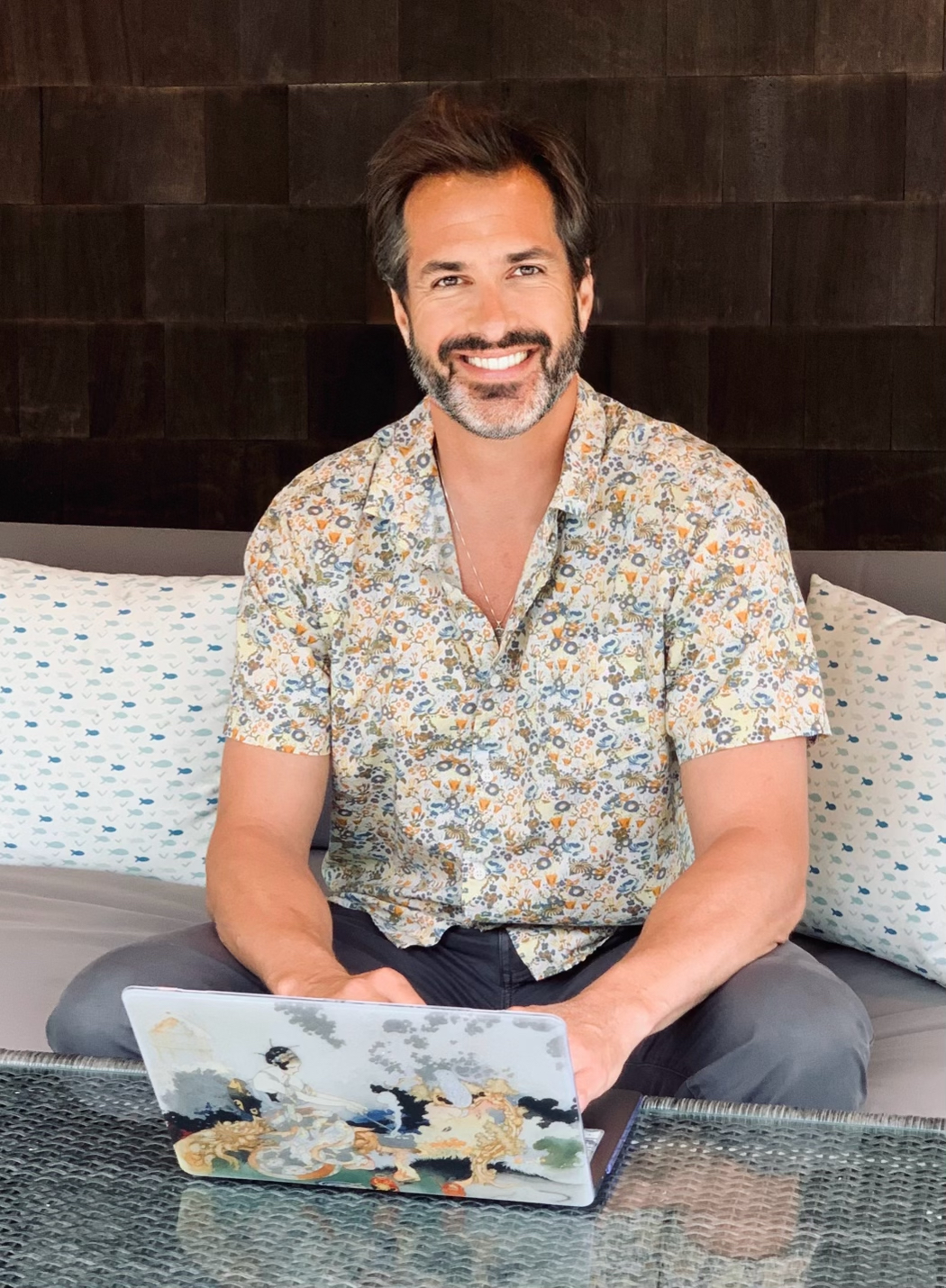
- Adam Healey, Novela Founder & CEO
- Born: Rome, Italy
- Occupation: Internet entrepreneur

Adam Raymond Healey (born in Rome, Italy) is an Internet entrepreneur.

Adam is the Founder & CEO of Novela, a software platform serving the wedding industry.

Previously, he was the co-founder & CEO of Borrowed & Blue, a web site serving the wedding industry, based in Charlottesville, Virginia, that was founded in 2011, and closed and sold to Zola in 2017, after an audit raised concerns about improper credit card charges.

Before that, Healey was the co-founder & CEO of hotelicopter, a hotel meta-search engine that he sold in 2011 to Room Key, a consortium of the six largest hotel chains in the world.

The hotel search engine hotelicopter (previously called VibeAgent) was featured by The Washington Post, Forbes, MSNBC, and USA Today.

He launched his first web startup, Samba Digital Media, in Prague in 1999 at the age of 24, where he built the company into one of the largest e-services firms in Central Europe.

Healey is also a frequent lecturer in Entrepreneurship at the McIntire School of Commerce at the University of Virginia, and serves on the board of the local startup hub HackCville.

In 2013 Healey was named one of the ‘Top 50 Entrepreneurs’ in Virginia by the Center for Innovative Technology. Healey was also featured in Entrepreneur magazine's April 2008 issue about entrepreneurs with MBAs.
