= James Healey =

James Healey may refer to:

- James C. Healey (1909–1981), American politician in New York
- James Healey (priest) (born 1944), Church of Ireland Dean of Lismore
- James Healey (actor) (fl. 1970–1996), Irish actor
- James Healey (Nevada politician), American politician in Nevada
