= Josh Healey =

Canadian ice hockey player

- Born: July 12, 1994 (age 32) Edmonton, Alberta, Canada
- Height: 6 ft 0 in (183 cm)
- Weight: 196 lb (89 kg; 14 st 0 lb)
- Position: Defence
- Shot: Left
- Played for: Stockton Heat; Milwaukee Admirals; Chicago Wolves; San Diego Gulls; Rockford IceHogs
- NHL draft: Undrafted
- Playing career: 2017–2024

Josh Healey (born July 12, 1994) is a Canadian professional ice hockey player who is a defenceman and an unrestricted free agent. He most recently played for the Rockford IceHogs of the American Hockey League (AHL). He is also the founder of The Sports Aux hockey recruiting platform.

== Playing career ==
Healey began his career in the Alberta Junior Hockey League (AJHL), playing parts of three seasons for the Sherwood Park Crusaders between 2010 and 2013. While Healey went unselected in the NHL entry draft, he attracted American college interest and committed to Ohio State University to play for the Buckeyes beginning with the 2013–14 Division I season.

Healey played with Ohio State for four years, emerging as one of the top players on the Big Ten team. He was named to the Big Ten's year-end all-star teams twice: to the first team in 2015–16 Division I season, and to the second team in 2016–17. During his final season with the team, on February 13, 2017, Healey was suspended two games by the Big Ten for a high hit against the University of Minnesota Golden Gophers. One NHL scout remarked of Healey that he "hits too hard for college hockey," but that "his game will be better suited for pro." Just over a month later, Healey turned professional by signing a two-year entry-level deal with the Calgary Flames of the National Hockey League (NHL).

At the conclusion of his entry-level deal with the Flames, Healey was not tendered a qualifying offer on June 25, 2019, enabling him to become a free agent. He was signed to a one-year AHL contract with the Milwaukee Admirals, affiliate to the Nashville Predators on August 2, 2019.

Healey continued to play through Predators affiliations, joining the Chicago Wolves for the pandemic-delayed 2020–21 season. After 20 regular season contests, Healey was signed by the Nashville Predators to add depth to the blueline on a two-way contract for the remainder of the year on April 11, 2021.

With the AHL season completed, Healey continued within the Predators organization, returning to the Milwaukee Admirals on a one-year AHL contract on May 19, 2021.

Moving to the San Diego Gulls for the 2022–23 season, Healey made 12 appearances as an alternate captain with the club before suffering a season-ending shoulder injury.

On July 4, 2023, Healey continued his tenure in the AHL, agreeing to a one-year contract with the Rockford IceHogs, the primary affiliate of the Chicago Blackhawks, for the 2023–24 season. He appeared in 48 games for the team, recording 1 assist.

== Personal life ==
Healey was born to Tim and Pam Healey and has a younger sister, Jess. Jess is a former professional ice hockey player. His grandfather, Rich Healey, is a former professional ice hockey player who played one NHL game for the Detroit Red Wings.

== Career statistics ==
			Regular season					Playoffs
Season	Team	League	GP	G	A	Pts	PIM	GP	G	A	Pts	PIM
2010–11	Sherwood Park Crusaders	AJHL	1	0	0	0	2	–	–	–	–	–
2011-12	Sherwood Park Crusaders	AJHL	47	2	10	12	59	9	0	2	2	2
2012–13	Sherwood Park Crusaders	AJHL	53	10	13	23	126	10	1	3	4	11
2013–14	Ohio State University	B1G	33	1	4	5	18	—	—	—	—	—
2014–15	Ohio State University	B1G	32	2	7	9	58	—	—	—	—	—
2015–16	Ohio State University	B1G	33	5	16	21	66	—	—	—	—	—
2016–17	Ohio State University	B1G	35	4	21	25	70	—	—	—	—	—
2016–17	Stockton Heat	AHL	2	0	0	0	0	—	—	—	—	—
2017–18	Stockton Heat	AHL	50	0	4	4	24	—	—	—	—	—
2018–19	Stockton Heat	AHL	55	1	10	11	64	—	—	—	—	—
2019–20	Milwaukee Admirals	AHL	30	0	3	3	72	—	—	—	—	—
2020–21	Chicago Wolves	AHL	33	2	4	6	70	—	—	—	—	—
2021–22	Milwaukee Admirals	AHL	57	1	7	8	89	6	0	0	0	6
2022–23	San Diego Gulls	AHL	12	0	0	0	37	—	—	—	—	—
2023–24	Rockford IceHogs	AHL	48	0	1	1	97	—	—	—	—	—
AHL totals			287	4	29	33	453	6	0	0	0	6
