= Robert Healy (artist) =

Irish painter

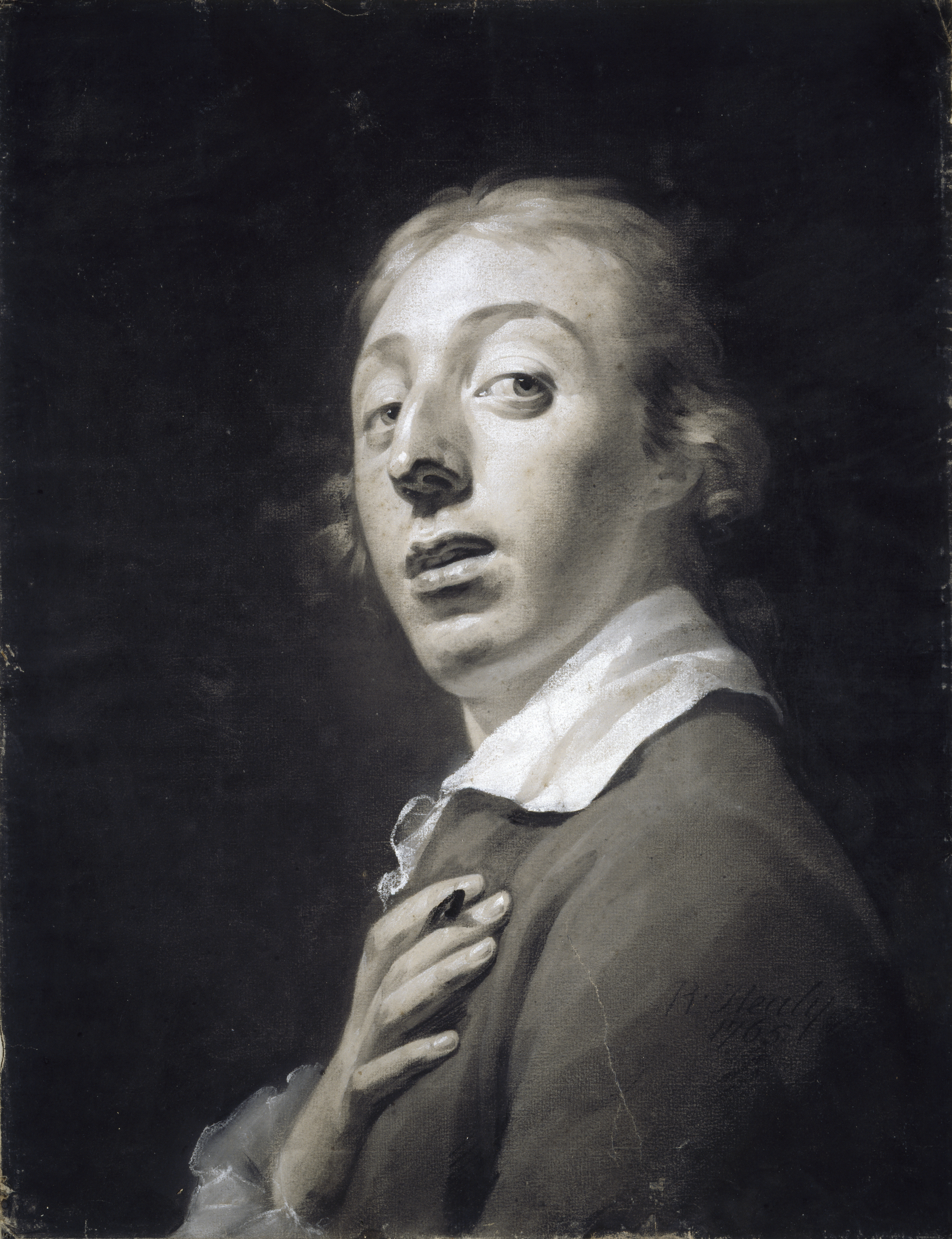
- Self-portrait, 1765
- Born: c. 1743; Ireland
- Died: July 1771; Ireland
- Occupation: Painter

Robert Healy (c. 1743 – July 1771), sometimes noted as Robert Hayley, was an Irish painter.

== Biography ==
Healy was born in Ireland, and studied at Dublin under Robert West. Healy is chiefly noted for a peculiar method of drawing in black and white chalk, successfully imitating mezzotint. Healy was well known for his pictures of horses. Many of his drawings were in the collections of the Earls of Moira and Mornington. Hayley died July 1771. His brother William Healy was an artist as well.
