= Thomas J. Healey =

American businessman and educator (born 1942)

- Born: September 14, 1942 (age 84); Baltimore, Maryland
- Education: MBA
- Alma mater: Georgetown University and Harvard University
- Occupation: Investment executive
- Title: Assistant Secretary of the United States Treasury for Domestic Finance
- Term: 1983 to 1987
- Spouse: Margaret Healey
- Children: T. Jeremiah Healey and Megan R. Healey Hagerty
- Parent: T. J. Healey (grandfather)
- Relatives: Joseph G. Healey (brother)

Thomas J. Healey (born September 14, 1942) is an American businessman and educator. He was a partner at Goldman, Sachs & Co., and is Senior Fellow at Harvard University’s John F. Kennedy School of Government. He served in the 1980s as Assistant Secretary of the United States Treasury and in the 1990s on the U.S. Department of Labor's Employee Benefits Security Administration Advisory Council Working Group on the Impact of Alternative Tax Proposals on ERISA Employer-Sponsored Plans.

== Early life and education ==
Healey was born in Baltimore, Maryland on September 14, 1942. Healey graduated from Georgetown University in 1964, followed by an MBA from Harvard University in 1966. He later became a lecturer at Kennedy School at Harvard.

== Career ==
=== Financial career ===
During the 1970s, Healey served as the head of the corporate finance department of Dean Witter Reynolds, Inc. In 1985 Healey founded the Real Estate Capital Markets Group at Goldman Sachs. He then founded the firm’s Pension Services Group, and became a managing partner of Goldman Sachs in 1996. Healey has served as the treasurer of the National Leadership Roundtable on Church Management and a senior fellow at Harvard University's John F. Kennedy School of Government. He is also a partner of the Healey Development LLC. Healey is the co-founder of five investment companies, including: KKR; FIA Timber Partners, a commingled fund making investments in timber; Prisma Capital Partners, ZAIS Group Holdings; and Anthos Capital, a seed-stage private equity firm.

=== Political career ===
Healey was appointed by President Ronald Reagan as Assistant Secretary of the Treasury for Domestic Finance in 1983. He was also appointed by the U.S. President as the Director of the Securities Investor Protection Corporation and served on the U.S. Department of Labor's ERISA Advisory Council. In August 2014, he was appointed by New Jersey Governor Chris Christie as a member of the Pension and Health Benefits Commission.

=== Bibliography ===
- Porter, R., Glauber, R., & Healey, T.J. (Eds). (2011). New Directions in Financial Regulation. Cambridge, MA: The MIT Press.

== Philanthropy ==
Healey has served as the chairman of the Rockefeller Foundation Investment Committee. He has worked with the Healey Family Student Center at Georgetown University which opened September 2014, and with the National Leadership Roundtable on Church Management. In 2012, Healey received the Catholic Charities Caritas award for working with the poor and impoverished. In 2011 he was entered into the Tri-County Scholarship Fund Hall of Fame. In 2010 he received the Mossavar-Rahmani Center for Business and Governments Distinguished Service Award.

== Personal life ==
Thomas Healey is married to his wife Margaret, a doctor of psychology, with whom he has two children: T. Jeremiah Healey and Megan R. Healey Hagerty, and nine grandchildren. He is the brother of the Maryknoll priest Joseph G. Healey.

== See also ==
- T. J. Healey, Hall of Fame horse trainer
- Joseph G. Healey, brother
- Graham-Paige, grandson of Joseph B Graham
