= Edward Healey (New York politician) =

American politician

- Born: August 20, 1885; New York City, New York, U.S.
- Died: January 4, 1945 (aged 59); Freeport, New York, U.S.
- Occupation: American politician
- Office: Member of the New York State Assembly
- Political party: Democrat
- Spouse: Josephine Healey
- Children: Kathryn, Mary E. Behr

Edward F. Healey (August 20, 1885 – January 4, 1945) was an American politician from New York.

== Life ==
Healey was born on August 20, 1885, in New York City, New York.

Healey attended public school and the DeWitt Clinton Evening High School. He worked in the surety insurance business. During World War I, he served as a private in the 1st Machine Gun Battalion and in the 66th Company, 5th Regiment, United States Marine Corps. He fought in the Champagne district and the Argonne Forrest, and was with the Army of Occupation on the German border. He was wounded while fighting in France. He was associated with the Fidelity and Casualty Company for the last ten years of his life.

In 1919, Healey was elected to the New York State Assembly as a Democrat, representing the New York County 14th District. He served in the Assembly in 1920. He lost the 1920 election to the Assembly, when he ran as a member of the Yorkville Alliance, to Democrat Frederick L. Hackenburg.

Healey was an organizer of the Yorkville section of the Dominican Lyceum, a member of the American Legion, and a secretary of the Delaware Club, the Tammany Hall Democratic district organization.

Healey died at his home in Freeport on January 4, 1945. His widow was Josephine and his daughters were Kathryn and Mrs. Mary E. Behr.

New York State Assembly
Preceded by Mark Goldberg	New York State Assembly; New York County, 14th District; 1920	Succeeded by Frederick L. Hackenburg
