= Florida's 84th House of Representatives district =

Florida district

Florida's 84th State House of Representatives district
Representative
Dana Trabulsy; R–Fort Pierce

Florida's 84th House of Representatives district elects one member of the Florida House of Representatives. It contains parts of St. Lucie County.

== Members ==
- Larry Lee Jr. (2012–2018)
- Delores Hogan Johnson (2018–2020)
- Dana Trabulsy (since 2020)
