= Miriam Oliphant =

Supervisor of Elections for Broward County, Florida

Miriam Oliphant was the Supervisor of Elections for Broward County, Florida, from January 2001, when she was elected to that position by over 65% of the vote, to November 2003 when she was suspended by Governor Jeb Bush for "...grave neglect, mismanagement and incompetence." Although even Democratic activists backed Bush's decision, Oliphant, the only African American holding a county-wide office at the time, enjoyed much support from the black community which reacted negatively to her ouster. In 2005, the Florida Senate voted 33 to 6 to uphold Governor Bush's removal of Oliphant. Although immediately following the vote Oliphant's attorney, Ellis Rubin, announced Oliphant would sue Governor Bush in Federal Court, no claim was ever filed.

== Early political career ==
In 1991, Oliphant was appointed by then-Governor Lawton Chiles to the Broward County School Board. She would subsequently win two elections to the office. Alan Schreiber, head of Broward County's Public Defender's office, helped Oliphant in her re-election campaigns. Oliphant had been a witness coordinator for Schreiber.

== Removal ==
Government investigators found that not only had her office neglected to perform some of its most essential tasks, but it had gone almost $1 million over budget. Among other findings was that Oliphant fired many experienced staff members, and replaced them with an all black and less (in some cases not-at-all) experienced friends and associates with significantly higher rates of pay.

She hired a college admissions representative who didn't even know what a primary election was and put her in charge of registration and absentee ballots. She promoted a computer specialist, whom she'd met in her condominium building, to deputy supervisor.

One of the most questioned of Oliphant's personnel decisions was that of hiring a homeless man, Glen Davis, whom she met at the same shelter as her sister, who is also homeless. Davis, who was given mail room duties, failed to process over 300 absentee ballots for a 2002 primary election. His performance notwithstanding, shortly before her removal Oliphant gave Davis a $5000 raise.

Due to Oliphant not hiring enough poll workers during the same 2002 primary, precinct voting locations had to open late and close early. All this was intolerable to Broward residents who had not forgotten the county's handling of the 2000 Presidential Election.

In February 2007, the Florida Elections Commission, which had originally fined Oliphant $55,000 and accused her of being "willfully and intentionally neglectful of her duties" dropped the fine. A state administrative law judge who heard the case agreed with Oliphant, who claimed she was not intentionally neglectful. His decision was based on an appeals court ruling in a separate case, where the Elections Commission was told it cannot fine elections officials for simply neglecting their duties but must show they intentionally set out to violate the laws or disregard them.
