= Florida's 86th House of Representatives district =

Florida district

Florida's 86th State House of Representatives district
Representative
John Snyder; R–Palm City

Florida's 86th House of Representatives district elects one member of the Florida House of Representatives. It contains parts of Martin County and Palm Beach County.

== Members ==
- Maria Sachs (2006–2010)
- Lori Berman (2010–2012)
- Mark Pafford (2012–2016)
- Matt Willhite (2016–2022)
- John Snyder (since 2022)
