= James Watt (Florida politician) =

American politician (1944–2025)

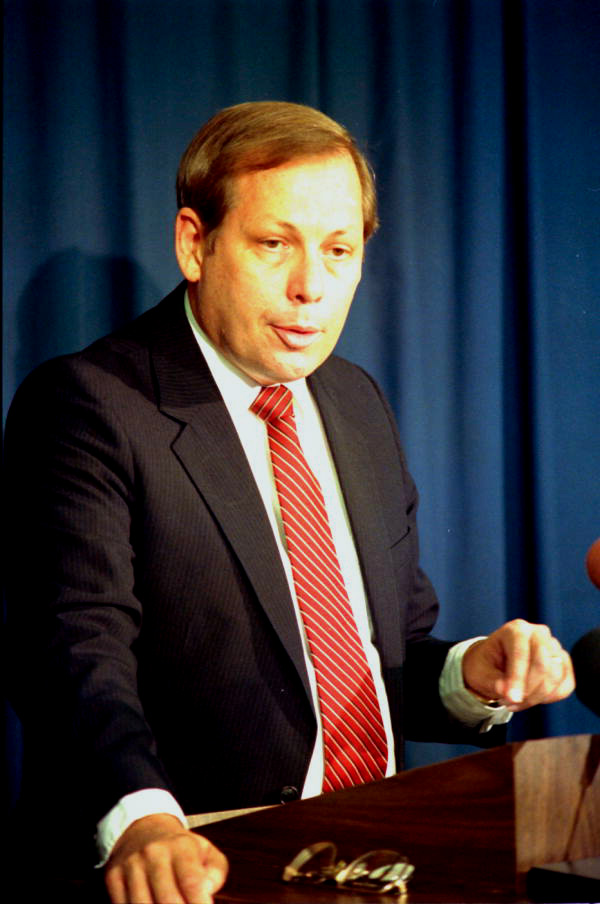
- Watt in 1986

Member of the Florida House of Representatives from the 80th district
- In office 1978–1982
- Preceded by: Bill James
- Succeeded by: James Hill

Member of the Florida House of Representatives from the 81st district
- In office 1982–1986
- Preceded by: Reid Moore Jr.
- Succeeded by: Marian Lewis

Personal details
- Born: James Lloyd Watt; April 22, 1944 Miami, Florida, U.S.
- Died: June 9, 2025 (aged 81) Lake Worth, Florida, U.S.
- Party: Republican

James "Jim" Lloyd Watt (April 22, 1944 – June 9, 2025) was an American politician. He was a member of the Florida House of Representatives from 1978 to 1986. The Florida Archives have a photo of him debative on the House floor in 1986. He was a Republican. In 1985, he ran for attorney general of Florida, but lost to Democratic candidate Bob Butterworth in 1986.

Watt died in Lake Worth, Florida on June 9, 2025, at the age of 81.

== See also ==
- J. P. C. Emmons, a Republican appointed Florida Attorney General in 1873
- 1986 Florida Attorney General election
