= Marian Lewis =

American politician (1929–2011)

Member of the Florida House of Representatives from the 81st district
- In office November 4, 1986 – November 3, 1992
- Preceded by: James Watt
- Succeeded by: Sharon Merchant (redistricting)

Personal details
- Born: January 2, 1929 Bloomsburg, Pennsylvania
- Died: May 23, 2011 (aged 82) Palm Beach County, Florida
- Party: Republican
- Spouse: Tom Lewis
- Children: 3
- Education: Palm Beach Junior College
- Occupation: Real estate broker

Marian V. Lewis (January 2, 1929 – May 23, 2011) was a Republican politician from Florida who served as a member of the Florida House of Representatives from the 81st district from 1986 to 1992. Prior to his death in 2003, Lewis was married to Congressman Tom Lewis.

== Early life ==
Lewis was born in Bloomsburg, Pennsylvania, in 1929, and grew up in poverty. She worked as a switchboard operator and in a factory as a candy wrapper. Lewis met her husband, Tom, while he was in the U.S. Air Force, and they lived in Alaska before relocating to Florida in 1952. She attended Palm Beach Junior College and, after raising her children, worked as a real estate broker.

== Florida House of Representatives ==
In 1986, when Republican State Representative James Watt opted to run for Attorney General rather than seek re-election, Lewis ran to succeed him in the 81st district. She faced bookstore owner Jim Genovese, former Palm Beach County Commissioner Peggy Evatt, and insurance agent Eugene Badger in the Republican primary. Evatt narrowly placed first in the primary, winning 31 percent of the vote to Lewis's 30 percent, and they advanced to a runoff. Lewis ultimately won the nomination over Evatt, receiving 54 percent of the vote to her 46 percent, and advanced to the general election, where she was opposed by Dick McKinnon, the Democratic nominee. She defeated McKinnon in a landslide, winning 63 percent of the vote to his 37 percent.

Lewis was re-elected unopposed to a second term in 1988. In 1990, she ran for re-election, and was challenged by Palm Beach Community College instructor Phil Jackson. She defeated Jackson by a wide margin in the general election, receiving 62 percent of the vote to his 38 percent.

In 1992, Lewis declined to seek re-election. Her legislative aide, Sharon Merchant, successfully ran to succeed her.

== Death ==
Lewis died in 2011.
