= 2014 Florida Chief Financial Officer election =

2014 Chief Financial Officer of Florida General Election
- November 4, 2014
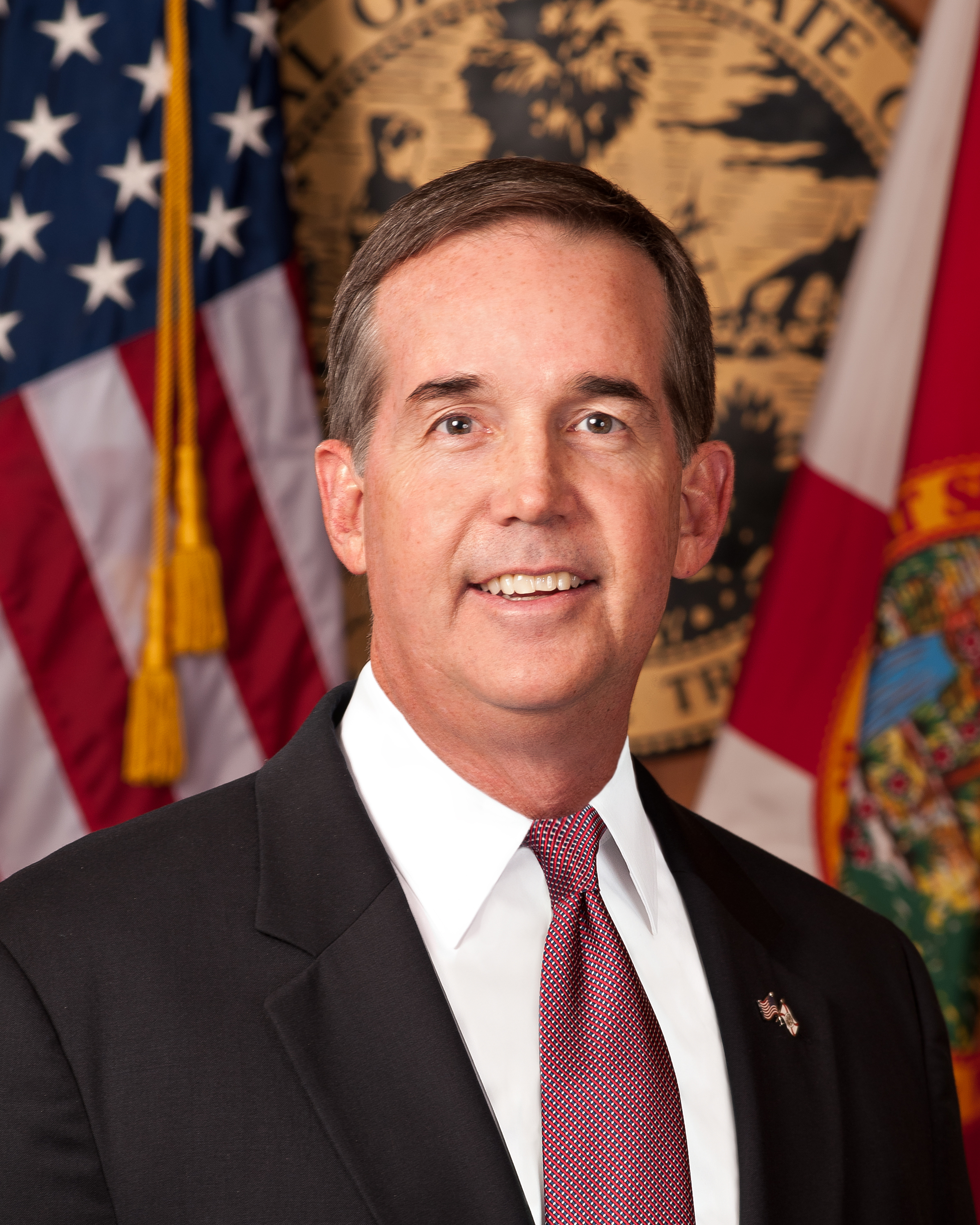

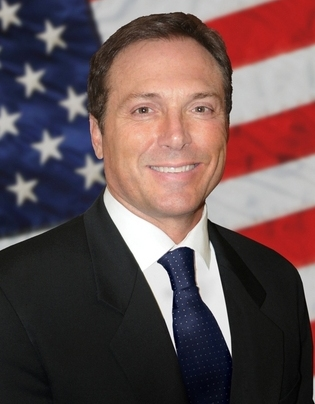
Nominee	Jeff Atwater	Will Rankin
Party	Republican	Democratic
Popular vote	3,353,897	2,337,727
Percentage	58.9%	41.1%
- Atwater: 50–60% 60–70% 70–80% 80–90% Rankin: 50–60% 60–70% 70–80% 80–90%
CFO before election
Jeff Atwater
Republican
Elected CFO
Jeff Atwater
Republican

The 2014 Florida Chief Financial Officer election took place on November 4, 2014, which resulted in the re-election of the Florida Chief Financial Officer. Incumbent Republican Chief Financial Officer Jeff Atwater ran for re-election to a second term in office.

== Republican primary ==
=== Candidates ===
==== Declared ====
- Jeff Atwater, incumbent Chief Financial Officer

== Democratic primary ==
=== Candidates ===
==== Declared ====
- Will Rankin, businessman, 11-year U.S. Army Veteran, and former Ohio director of asset management

==== Withdrew ====
- Allie Braswell, President of the Central Florida Urban League

==== Declined ====
- Jim Waldman, state representative

== General election ==
=== Candidates ===
- Jeff Atwater (Republican)
- Will Rankin (Democratic)

=== Endorsements ===
Jeff Atwater

Organizations

- Florida Medical Association
- Florida Police Benevolent Association

Newspapers

- The Bradenton Herald
- The Bradenton Times
- The Florida Times-Union
- The Miami Herald
- The Palm Beach Post
- Sun-Sentinel
- Tampa Bay Times
- Tampa Tribune
Will Rankin

Organizations

- Florida Alliance for Retired Americans

=== Polling ===
Poll source	Date(s) administered	Sample size	Margin of error	Jeff Atwater (R)	Will Rankin (D)	Undecided
Public Policy Polling	November 1–2, 2014	1,198	± 2.8%	51%	37%	12%
Saint Leo University	October 16–19, 2014	500	± 4.9%	50%	35%	15%
Public Policy Polling	September 4–7, 2014	818	± 3.8%	46%	34%	20%

=== By congressional district ===
Atwater won 21 of 27 congressional districts, including four that elected Democrats.

District	Atwater	Rankin	Representative
1st	75%	25%	Jeff Miller
2nd	59%	41%	Gwen Graham
3rd	67%	33%	Ted Yoho
4th	71%	29%	Ander Crenshaw
5th	37%	63%	Corrine Brown
6th	65%	35%	Ron DeSantis
7th	63%	37%	John Mica
8th	65%	35%	Bill Posey
9th	50.5%	49.5%	Alan Grayson
10th	63%	37%	Daniel Webster
11th	68%	32%	Rich Nugent
12th	66%	34%	Gus Bilirakis
13th	62%	38%	Bill Young
14th	48%	52%	Kathy Castor
15th	64%	36%	Dennis Ross
16th	63%	37%	Vern Buchanan
17th	67%	33%	Tom Rooney
18th	62%	38%	Patrick Murphy
19th	69%	31%	Trey Radel
20th	22%	78%	Alcee Hastings
21st	47%	53%	Ted Deutch
22nd	54%	46%	Lois Frankel
23rd	44%	56%	Debbie Wasserman Schultz
24th	16%	84%	Frederica Wilson
25th	62%	38%	Mario Díaz-Balart
26th	55%	45%	Carlos Curbelo
27th	56%	44%	Ileana Ros-Lehtinen
