= Senator Pruitt =

Senator Pruitt may refer to:

- Ken Pruitt (born 1957), Florida State Senate
- Scott Pruitt (born 1968), Oklahoma State Senate
