= Gayle Harrell =

American politician

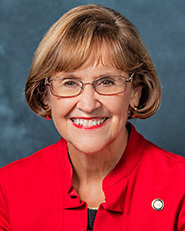

Member of the Florida Senate
- Incumbent
- Assumed office November 6, 2018
- Preceded by: Joe Negron
- Constituency: 25th district (2018–2022); 31st district (2022–present)

Member of the Florida House of Representatives
- In office November 2, 2010 – November 6, 2018
- Preceded by: Adam Fetterman
- Succeeded by: Toby Overdorf
- Constituency: 81st district (2010–2012); 83rd district (2012–2018)

Member of the Florida House of Representatives from the 81st district
- In office November 7, 2000 – November 4, 2008
- Preceded by: Ken Pruitt
- Succeeded by: Adam Fetterman

Personal details
- Born: July 21, 1943 (age 83) Nashville, Tennessee, U.S.
- Party: Republican
- Spouse: James E. "Jim" Harrell
- Children: Stephanie; Jennifer; James, Jr.; Melinda
- Education: University of Florida (BA, MA)
- Profession: Health information technology consultant

Gayle Harrell (born July 21, 1943) is a member of the Florida State Senate. A Republican, she is a former member of the Florida House of Representatives, representing the 83rd District, which includes Port St. Lucie and Stuart in northern Martin County and southern St. Lucie County, from 2012 to 2018. Harrell previously represented the 81st District from 2000 to 2008 and again from 2010 to 2012.

== History ==
Harrell was born in Nashville, Tennessee. She moved to the state of Florida, where she attended the University of Florida. She graduated in 1964 with a bachelor's degree in Spanish, and again in 1971, with a master's degree in Latin American studies and history. After graduation, she worked as a technology consultant on health information.

== Florida House of Representatives ==
In 2000, incumbent State Representative Ken Pruitt successfully ran for a seat in the Florida Senate rather than seek re-election, which created an open seat in the 81st District, which included parts of Martin County and St. Lucie County. Harrell ran to succeed Pruitt and defeated Genny Jackson in the Republican primary with 68% of the vote, advancing to the general election, where she faced Walter Sawyer, the Democratic nominee, whom she was able to defeat easily, winning 59% of the vote to his 41%. She ran for re-election in 2002 and faced only Libertarian candidate John Roszman. Harrell defeated Roszman overwhelmingly, scoring 76% of the vote to his 24%. She was challenged in the Republican primary in 2004 by Charles Winn, but she turned back the challenge easily, winning renomination with 75% of the vote. In the general election, she won nearly 100% of the vote, only facing opposition from write-in candidate Robert Lilley. She met a serious challenge to her re-election in 2006, when Bill Ramos, a mortgage broker, and the Democratic nominee, campaigned on "eliminating unfunded mandates from the state to the local level." During the campaign, Ramos was endorsed over Harrell by The Palm Beach Post, which criticized Harrell for "too obediently" voting the party line and for having "so little clout in Tallahassee that she can't protect her well-intentioned legislation from harmful amendments." Ultimately, however, the conservative nature of the district proved too much for Ramos to overcome. Harrell won re-election over him, scoring 54% of the vote to her opponent's 46%.

== 2008 congressional campaign ==
Unable to seek re-election in the legislature due to term limits, Harrell instead decided to run against Democratic United States Congressman Tim Mahoney in the 16th congressional district, running against Tom Rooney and Hal Valeche. During the campaign, former 2008 Republican presidential candidate Mike Huckabee conducted an internet poll to determine whom his political action committee, Huck PAC, should support in the race. Harrell won the internet poll and promptly sent mailers claiming Huckabee's endorsement. This drew a clarification from the PAC's spokesperson, who said the endorsement was not from Huckabee but from Huckabee's supporters. Ultimately, however, Huckabee stepped into the race, praising all three candidates but noting, "The community I built during my campaign has voted, and voted to endorse Gayle. I have heard their call, and I will stand with those that have supported me and officially declare my support for Gayle." Harrell also earned the support of the National Rifle Association of America in her campaign for Congress. Harrell ultimately failed to win her party's nomination, however, narrowly losing to Rooney by a little more than a thousand votes, receiving 35% of the vote to Rooney's 38% and Valeche's 28%.

== Return to Florida House ==
Following her 2008 defeat, Harrell announced that she would seek to return to the state legislature and filed to run against her successor, Democratic State Representative Adam Fetterman, who narrowly won the seat in 2008. During the campaign, Harrell attacked Fetterman for supporting a cigarette tax increase and for having a low rating from the Florida Chamber of Commerce, declaring, "When it comes to taxes, I'm a fiscal conservative. I have voted to reduce taxes by over $28 billion. My opponent voted for a $1 billion increase in taxes." The Palm Beach Post endorsed Fetterman over Harrell, praising the incumbent for closing a loophole that allowed sexual predators to avoid prosecution, and once again criticizing Harrell for her record in the legislature, where "she wasn't known for bucking the GOP leadership." However, Harrell was able to dispatch Fetterman with relative ease, regaining her seat and earning 56% of the vote to Fetterman's 44%.

In 2012, following the reconfiguration of the state's legislative districts, Harrell was drawn into the 83rd District, which contained most of the territory she had previously represented in the 81st District. She won the Republican primary uncontested. She won the general election overwhelmingly against only a write-in challenge, securing her second consecutive term and her sixth term overall in the legislature.

== Florida State Senate ==
Harrell was elected to the Florida State Senate in November 2018. She succeeded Joe Negron.

== Other ==
She is one of the founders of Maggie's List.

Florida House of Representatives
Preceded by Ken Pruitt	Member of the Florida House of Representatives from the 81st district 2000–2008	Succeeded by Adam Fetterman
Preceded by Adam Fetterman	Member of the Florida House of Representatives from the 81st district 2010–2012	Succeeded by Kevin Rader
Preceded by Patrick Rooney Jr.	Member of the Florida House of Representatives from the 83rd district 2012–2018	Succeeded by Toby Overdorf
Florida Senate
Preceded by Joe Negron	Member of the Florida Senate from the 25th district 2018–2022	Succeeded by Vic Torres
Preceded by Lori Berman	Member of the Florida Senate from the 31st district 2022–present	Incumbent
