= 1998 Florida Attorney General election =

- November 3, 1998
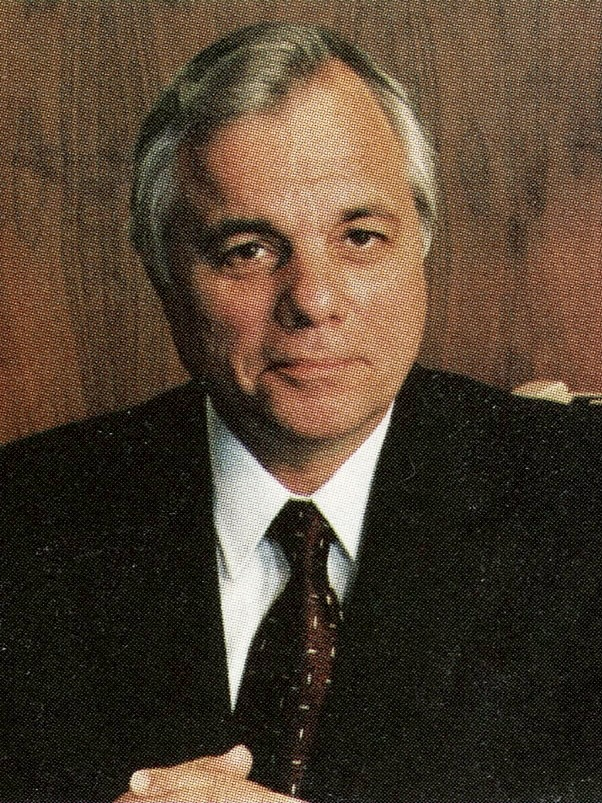

Nominee	Bob Butterworth	David H. Bludworth
Party	Democratic	Republican
Popular vote	2,301,328	1,562,269
Percentage	59.6%	40.4%
- Butterworth: 50–60% 60–70% 70–80% 80–90% >90% Bludworth: 50–60% 60–70% 70–80% 80–90% >90% Tie: 40–50% 50% No votes
Attorney General before election
Bob Butterworth
Democratic
Elected Attorney General
Bob Butterworth
Democratic

The 1998 Florida Attorney General election was held on November 3, 1998. Democratic incumbent Bob Butterworth defeated Republican nominee David H. Bludworth with 59.56% of the vote. As of 2026, this was the last time a Democrat was elected Florida Attorney General.

== Primary elections ==
Primary elections were held on September 1, 1998.

=== Democratic primary ===
==== Candidates ====
- Bob Butterworth, Florida Attorney General
- Ellis Rubin, attorney

==== Results ====
Democratic primary results
Party	Candidate	Votes	%
Democratic	Bob Butterworth	475,757	81.80
Democratic	Ellis Rubin	105,865	18.20
Total votes		581,622	100.00

=== Republican primary ===
Republican Primary results by county: Bludworth: 50–60%; 60–70%; 70–80%; Dudley: 50–60%; 60–70%; 70–80%

==== Candidates ====
- David H. Bludworth
- Fred Dudley, State Senator

==== Results ====
Republican primary results
Party	Candidate	Votes	%
Republican	David H. Bludworth	298,375	53.89
Republican	Fred Dudley	255,274	46.11
Total votes		553,649	100.00

== General election ==
=== Candidates ===
- Bob Butterworth, Democratic
- David H. Bludworth, Republican

=== Results ===
1998 Florida Attorney General election
Party	Candidate	Votes	%	±%
Democratic	Bob Butterworth	2,301,328	59.56%	
Republican	David H. Bludworth	1,562,269	40.44%	
Majority		739,059		
Turnout				
Democratic hold		Swing		
