= Carl Domino =

American politician

Carl Joseph Domino
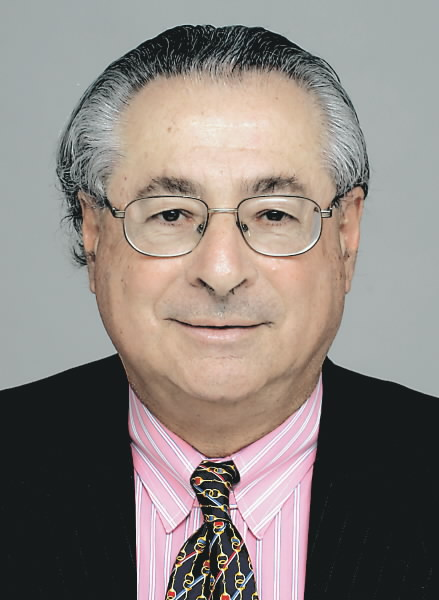

Member of the Florida House of Representatives from the 83rd district
- In office November 5, 2002 – November 2, 2010
- Preceded by: Jeff Atwater
- Succeeded by: Pat Rooney

Personal details
- Born: April 15, 1944 (age 82)
- Party: Republican
- Education: Florida State University (BS); Harvard University (MBA); Nova Southeastern University (JD)
- Profession: Investment manager
- Religion: Catholic

Carl Joseph Domino (born April 15, 1944) is a former member of the Florida House of Representatives, representing the 83rd district from 2002 to 2010. He was the Republican nominee for the United States House of Representatives in Florida's 18th congressional district in 2014 but was defeated by Patrick Murphy.

== Education ==
Domino received his bachelor's degree in accounting from Florida State University in 1966. He received his MBA from Harvard University in 1972. In 2014, at the age of 70, Domino obtained a Juris Doctor degree from Nova Southeastern University's Shepard Broad College of Law.

== Career ==
Domino is a former officer in the U.S. Navy. He began his career as an investment manager in 1972. He started Carl Domino Associates in 1987, which was renamed Northern Trust Value Investors (NTVI) in 2000. Domino serves as president of NTVI, which has $3.5 billion of assets under management.

== Florida House of Representatives ==
Domino served in the Florida House of Representatives, representing the 83rd district, from 2002 to 2010. Domino was not eligible to run for re-election to the Florida House of Representatives in 2010 due to term limits. He instead opted to run for the Florida State Senate, losing in the Republican primary for district 25. He served as Majority Whip from 2004 to 2006.

In 2012 Domino ran to represent Florida's House of Representatives' District 82. He was defeated in the Republican primary by MaryLynn Magar.

== United States House of Representatives ==
Domino ran for U.S. Congress twice:

=== 2014 ===
In 2014, Domino ran to represent Florida's 18th congressional district. He won a six-way Republican primary in August 2014, and faced incumbent Democrat Patrick Murphy in the general election.

Domino got 40.2% of the vote, losing to Murphy's 59.8%.

=== 2016 ===
In 2016, Domino ran again for the Republican nomination for the 18th District seat, which was being vacated by Murphy, but lost the August 30, 2016, placing fourth with 13% of the vote in a six-way race that was won by Brian Mast.

== Personal life ==
Domino was born in Prince William County, Virginia and lived in Jacksonville, North Carolina before moving to Jupiter, Florida in 1958. He was married to Deborah Claney Domino, but divorced. He currently resides in Jupiter with his wife, Sharon, and their two children. He has served on the board of directors of the Seminole Boosters, the American Cancer Society, the Palm Beach Economic Council, and Easter Seals Florida.

Florida House of Representatives
Preceded by Jeff Atwater	Member of the Florida House of Representatives from the 83rd district 2002–2010	Succeeded by Pat Rooney
