= Ken Pruitt =

American politician

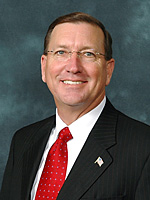

President of the Florida Senate
- In office November 21, 2006 – November 18, 2008
- Preceded by: Tom Lee
- Succeeded by: Jeff Atwater

Member of the Florida Senate
- In office November 21, 2000 – 2009
- Preceded by: Doc Myers
- Succeeded by: Joe Negron
- Constituency: 27th district (2001–2003); 28th district (2003–2009)

Member of the Florida House of Representatives
- In office 1993–2000
- Preceded by: Chuck Nergard
- Succeeded by: Gayle Harrell
- Constituency: 79th (1991–1993); 81st (1993-2000)

Personal details
- Born: January 24, 1957 (age 69) Miami, Florida, U.S.
- Party: Republican
- Spouse: Aileen Kelly
- Occupation: Business Development

Ken Pruitt (born January 24, 1957) is an American politician who served as a member of the Florida Senate. A Republican, he represented the 27th district and the 28th District from 2000 to 2009, which included portions of Indian River, Martin, Okeechobee, Palm Beach and St. Lucie Counties. He was previously a member of the Florida House of Representatives from 1990 through 2000.

On November 21, 2006, Ken Pruitt was chosen by the unanimous vote of his colleagues to serve a two-year term as President of the Florida Senate. He succeeded Tom Lee and preceded Jeff Atwater in this capacity. From 2006 to 2008, Pruitt served as the 78th President of the Florida Senate. His other prominent leadership roles have included committee chairmanships of the Senate Rules Committee (2004–2006), Senate Appropriations Committee (2002–2004) and House Appropriations Committee (1998–2000).

== Florida Bright Futures ==
After the 1996 general election, with Republicans the majority party in the Florida House of Representatives, Rep. Pruitt was able to shepherd through the Bright Futures Scholarship Act (CS/CS/SB 858 – 1997) during the 1997 legislative session. The bill was responsible for creating the state's popular merit based aid programs for college students known as Florida Bright Futures Scholarships. These lottery funded scholarships have helped more than 300,000 Florida students attend a post-secondary institution and Pruitt has remained an ardent supporter of the program throughout his political career.

In late 2003, Senator Ken Pruitt embarked on a statewide tour of all eleven state universities and all 28 community colleges in an effort to draw up support for higher education in Florida. The Brighter Futures Express Educational Tour traveled to the various state institutions of higher learning with the intention of reminding fellow lawmakers to "keep the promise" they had made to Floridians on programs like Florida Bright Futures and Florida Prepaid. Most notably from the tour was that Pruitt traveled from school to school in a used yellow school bus. The tour concluded on March 17, 2004 with a gathering on the steps of the historic state capitol. Over 3,000 students, teachers, and parents attended the political rally which was addressed by numerous speakers, including Senator Pruitt and Miss America 2004, Ericka Dunlap. The crowd was also treated to a performance by the Florida A&M University Marching 100.

=== Bright Futures Debate ===
The Florida Legislature created the Florida Bright Futures Scholarship Program to reward students for their academic achievements during high school by providing funding to attend postsecondary education in Florida. The Bright Futures Scholarship was inspired by the Hope Scholarship. Originally the Program dispersed just above 42,000 scholarships for about $70 million. Over the last decade the cost for the scholarship has increased substantially as more students remain in Florida to receive higher education thereby, stopping the brain drain. The Scholarship currently costs the Florida Lottery more than $436.1 million, with about 170,000 students taking advantage of the program this ensures the promise that lottery money will be used to supplement education.

== Lake Okeechobee ==
During the 2000 Florida Legislative Session, Pruitt sponsored and passed the landmark Lake Okeechobee Protection Program (LOPP). The act (CS/CS/HB 991 – 2000) called for the implementation of phosphorus load reductions, construction of stormwater treatment areas (STA), monitoring of water quality in the Lake Okeechobee watershed, and the development of "Best Management Practices" (BMP) for both agricultural and non-agricultural sources within the watershed. The enactment of LOPP has helped Florida protect and preserve the largest fresh water lake in the southern United States and contributed to the overall health of the Everglades. This important legislation (along with the 2005 Lake Okeechobee & Estuary Recovery Program (LOER)) has helped earmark tens of millions of dollars to the restoration of Lake Okeechobee, the St. Lucie River and the Indian River Lagoon.

== Bert Harris Act & the APA ==
In 1992 as a Republican and member of the minority party in the Florida House, Pruitt teamed with veteran Representative and Democrat, Bert J. Harris Jr., in an effort to address the over-regulation and ownership rights of privately owned property. After two unsuccessful pushes to pass their Private Property Rights Protection Act, the two Representatives caught the break they needed in the third year. Prior to the 1995 Florida Legislative Session, Governor Lawton Chiles, having recently experienced a regulatory roadblock when he attempted to build a "cook shack" on his own private property, was ready to support the lawmakers' efforts. The Governor's momentum helped enabled the two representatives to pass the bill (CS/HB 863 - 1995) through both chambers with only a single dissenting vote. Representative Pruitt honored his partner and friend by renaming the bill the Bert J. Harris Jr. Private Property Rights Protection Act. Governor Chiles signed the act on May 18, 1995 and the Bert Harris Act has since served as a model to other states addressing environmental and land use regulation in respect to the rights of private property owners.

Furthermore, the Governor's "cook shack" difficulties and crusade against superfluous rulemaking, government red-tape and over-regulation set the stage for an overhaul of Florida's Administrative Procedures Act, reforms the legislature had been attempting for several years. In addition to sponsoring the Bert Harris Act in 1995, Pruitt was the prime sponsor of the APA legislation. While the act was vetoed by Chiles in 1995 as being too burdensome for the implementing agencies, it was passed the following year, making the first major reforms to Florida's APA since its inception in 1974.

== Committee for a Sustainable Treasure Coast and the "Research Coast" ==
On March 30, 2004, Governor Jeb Bush signed Executive Order No. 04-61 creating the Committee for a Sustainable Treasure Coast, Pruitt's proposed 37-member, three-county regional commission designed to increase cooperation and coordination between St. Lucie, Martin, and Indian River counties. The committee's main objective was to provide local governments with the tools to plan for and create incentives for responsible and sustainable growth on the Treasure Coast of Florida. A final report was adopted in late September 2005 and delivered to the Governor, Speaker of the House, and Senate President.

The following legislative session in 2006, Senator Pruitt was a fervent supporter of legislation introduced and passed by Senator Mike Fasano creating Florida's Innovation Incentive Program (CS/CS/2728–2006). This economic development initiative provides resources for the recruitment or expansion of major research and development entities and innovation businesses in Florida. With the groundwork already laid by the CSTC, Pruitt and a motivated group of local leaders, both public and private, were able to attract the Torrey Pines Institute for Molecular Studies to Port St. Lucie to set up an east coast operation. Two years later, in April 2008, the Innovative Incentive Fund also helped bring the Oregon Health and Science University Vaccine Gene Therapy Institute (VGTI) to the area. The development of this biotech cluster, in addition to the cluster including the Scripps Research Institute and the Max Planck Institute in Jupiter, Florida, has allowed the area to become known as Florida's "Research Coast," a designation first given by Senator Ken Pruitt.

== Family ==
Ken Pruitt married Aileen Kelly in 1982. They have five children, Kenneth Jr. (deceased) Steven, Ashley, Michelle and Mark. Aileen Pruitt was 1st Lady of the Florida Senate from 2006 to 2008. She is involved in numerous volunteer organizations, is a two-time breast cancer survivor and is Executive Director of National City Corp. Community Development Association for Central & NE Florida. Mrs. Pruitt was also appointed by Governor Charlie Crist to serve on the Governor's Commission on Volunteerism & Community Service.

== Professional ==
Ken Pruitt worked with the law firm Weiss, Handler, Angelos and Cornwell as Senior Advisor for Governmental Affairs and Public Policy. He was elected Property Appraiser for St Lucie County, Florida in November, 2010 following the death of then-Property Appraiser, Jeff Furst. Pruitt's term expired in 2016

== Education ==
- Certificates in Water and Wastewater Treatment from Indian River State College.

Florida House of Representatives
Preceded by Chuck Nergard	Member of the Florida House of Representatives from the 79th district 1990–1992	Succeeded by Irlo Bronson Jr.
Preceded by Marian V. Lewis	Member of the Florida House of Representatives from the 81st district 1992–2000	Succeeded by Gayle Harrell
Florida Senate
Preceded by Doc Myers	Member of the Florida Senate from the 27th district 2000–2002	Succeeded by Dave Aronberg
Preceded by Ron Klein	Member of the Florida Senate from the 28th district 2002–2008	Succeeded by Joe Negron
Political offices
Preceded by Tom Lee	President of the Florida Senate; 2006–2008	Succeeded by Jeff Atwater
