= Bob Rommel =

American politician

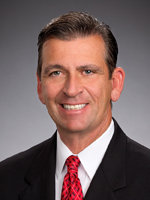

Member of the Florida House of Representatives
- In office November 8, 2016 – November 5, 2024
- Preceded by: Kathleen Passidomo
- Succeeded by: Yvette Benarroch
- Constituency: 106th district (2016–2022); 81st district (2022–2024)

Personal details
- Born: November 30, 1962 (age 63) Red Bank, New Jersey, U.S.
- Party: Republican

Bob Rommel (born November 30, 1962) is an American politician who served in the Florida House of Representatives from 2016 to 2024. As of 2026, he currently serves as the chair of the Florida chapter of the America First Policy Institute.
