= 1986 Florida Attorney General election =

- November 4, 1986
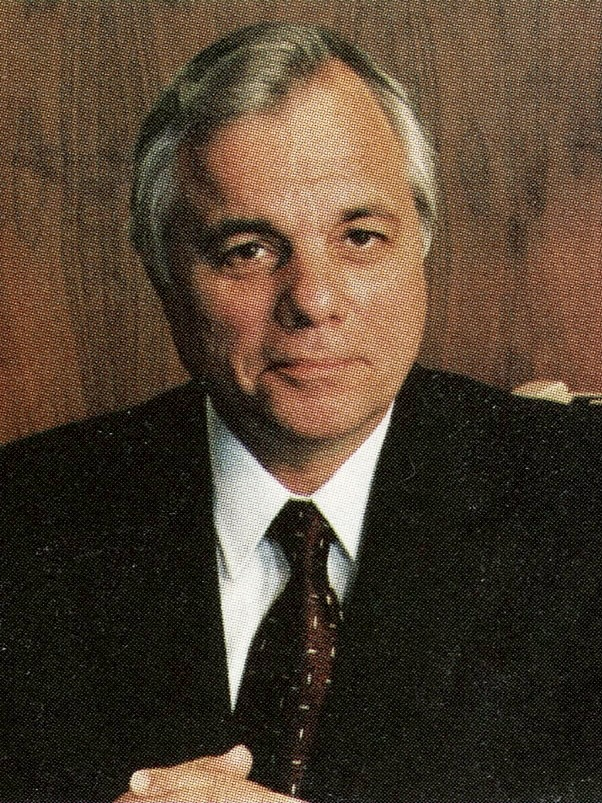

| Nominee | Bob Butterworth | James Watt |
| Party | Democratic | Republican |
| Popular vote | 1,900,890 | 1,341,090 |
| Percentage | 58.6% | 41.4% |
- County results Butterworth: 50–60% 60–70% 70–80% 80-90% Watt: 50–60% 60–70%
Attorney General before election
James C. Smith
Democratic
Elected Attorney General
Bob Butterworth
Democratic

The 1986 election for Florida Attorney General was held on November 4, 1986. Bob Butterworth would be elected defeating James Watt with 58.63% of the vote. Incumbent James C. Smith would not run in this election.

== Primary election ==
Primary elections were held on September 2, 1986.

=== Democratic primary ===
The positions for Walt Dartland are known. Dartland would say while running for Attorney General that he was opposed to the death penalty, giving the juries the option of recommending life sentences without parole instead of the death penalty. He would also uniquely offer a money-back guarantee for anyone who made a donation under $100 and was unsatisfied with his performance when he became attorney general would give a refund.

==== Candidates ====
- Ed M. Dunn, Jr., State Senator
- Bob Butterworth, former Sheriff of Broward County
- Joe Gersten, State Senator
- Walt Dartland, deputy Attorney General and consumer rights advocate.

==== Results ====
Democratic Primary – September 2, 1986
| Party | Candidate | Votes | % |
|---|---|---|---|
| Democratic | Ed M. Dunn, Jr. | 315,897 | 34.1%' |
| Democratic | Bob Butterworth | 301,192 | 32.5% |
| Democratic | Joe Gersten | 231,171 | 25.0% |
| Democratic | Walt Dartland | 77,758 | 8.4% |
| Total votes | | 926,018 | 100 |

=== Republican primary ===
Watt would be in favor of: giving tougher penalties to those who were crack cocaine dealers, give more power to the attorney general for fighting consumer fraud especially for the elderly, limiting the number of appeals death row inmates can make, increase the federal government's commitments to intersect drug smugglers, giving state cabinet members two terms while he would be against gambling in casinos.

==== Candidates ====
- C. Lavon Ward, former Broward County public defender, state representative and Broward County state circuit court judge. Attorney for the Broward County Republican Party.
- Jim Watt, State Representative, Florida House of Representatives minority leader and attorney.

==== Results ====
Republican Primary – September 2, 1986
| Party | Candidate | Votes | % |
|---|---|---|---|
| Republican | Jim Watt | 346,429 | 73.2% |
| Republican | C. Lavon Ward | 126,782 | 26.8% |
| Total votes | | 473,211 | 100 |

== General election ==
=== Candidates ===
Bob Butterworth, Democratic

Jim Watt, Republican

=== Results ===
1986 Florida Attorney General election
| Party | Candidate | Votes | % | ±% |
|---|---|---|---|---|
| Democratic | Bob Butterworth | 1,900,890 | 58.63% | |
| Republican | Jim Watt | 1,341,090 | 41.37% | |
| Democratic hold | | Swing | | |
