= Jeff Atwater =

American financier

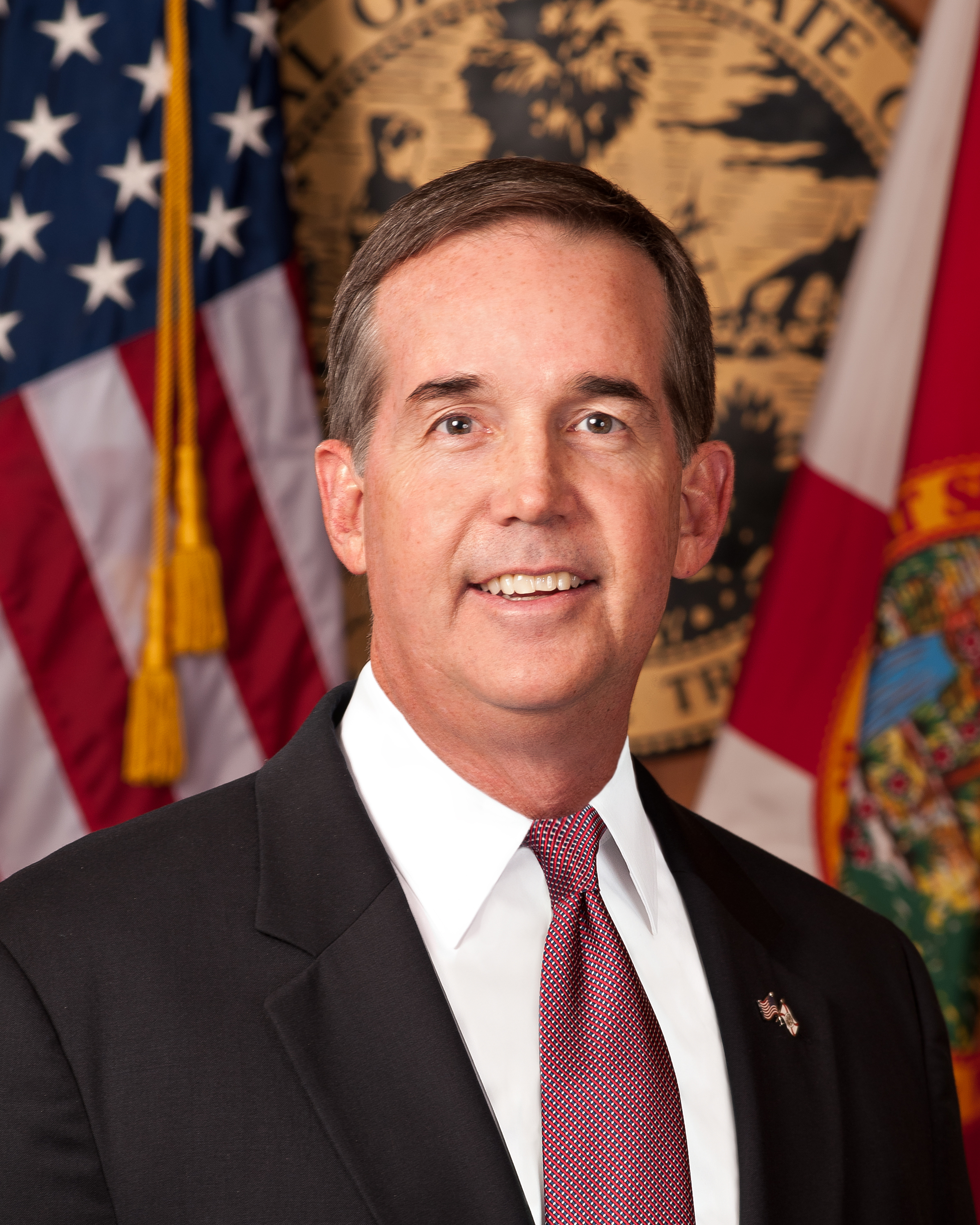

3rd Chief Financial Officer of Florida
- In office January 4, 2011 – June 30, 2017
- Governor: Rick Scott
- Preceded by: Alex Sink
- Succeeded by: Jimmy Patronis

President of the Florida Senate
- In office November 18, 2008 – November 16, 2010
- Preceded by: Ken Pruitt
- Succeeded by: Mike Haridopolos

Member of the Florida Senate from the 25th district
- In office November 19, 2002 – November 16, 2010
- Preceded by: Burt Saunders
- Succeeded by: Ellyn Setnor Bogdanoff

Member of the Florida House of Representatives from the 83rd district
- In office November 21, 2000 – November 19, 2002
- Preceded by: Sharon Merchant
- Succeeded by: Carl Domino

Personal details
- Born: Jeffrey Hardee Atwater; April 8, 1958 (age 68) St. Louis, Missouri, U.S.
- Party: Republican
- Spouse: Carole Funkhouser
- Children: 4
- Education: University of Florida (BS, MBA)

Jeffrey Hardee Atwater (born April 8, 1958) is an American financier and politician who served as the 3rd Chief Financial Officer of Florida from 2011 to 2017, and currently serves as vice president for Strategic Initiatives and Chief Financial Officer at Florida Atlantic University. He is a member of the Republican Party.

== Biography ==
Atwater moved to Florida at the age of four and grew up in North Palm Beach, Florida, where his father, a veteran World War II pilot and FBI agent, served as police chief. He went on to gain substantial experience in banking, and was elected to the North Palm Beach Village Council in 1993. Later, he served as chairman, president, and CEO of the Barnett Bank of Broward County and the Treasure Coast, and later as market president of Riverside National Bank for Broward and Palm Beach County.

In 2000, Atwater ran for the Florida House of Representatives from the 83rd District, defeating Democratic nominee Pam Dunston and independent Michael I. Danchuk. After just two years in the House, he ran for the Florida Senate from the 25th District, which included Palm Beach and Broward counties. Unopposed in the primary election, Atwater faced off against long-serving Democratic Attorney General of Florida Bob Butterworth in the general election, and, aided by then-Governor Jeb Bush's strong performance that year, defeated Butterworth by a solid margin. He was re-elected in 2004 with no opposition, and again in 2008, when he defeated Democrat Linda Bird, a realtor. From 2008 to 2010, he was President of the Florida Senate.

Following the decision by then-Chief Financial Officer Alex Sink to run for governor rather than seek re-election, Atwater jumped into the race to succeed Sink. In the general election, Atwater faced off against former State Representative Loranne Ausley, whom he defeated by 18 percentage points.

Though considered as a frontrunner, in April 2015, he declined to run for the United States Senate seat that incumbent Marco Rubio was expected to vacate before the 2016 elections to run for President of the United States.

In 2017, it was announced that Atwater would be resigning from his position as Chief Financial Officer of Florida to become vice president for Strategic Initiatives and Chief Financial Officer at Florida Atlantic University.

== Electoral history ==
Florida State House of Representatives 83rd District Republican Primary Election, 2000
Party	Candidate	Votes	%
Republican	Jeff Atwater	5,101	71.2
Republican	Helen Zientek	1,049	14.6
Republican	Carl Domino	1,011	14.1

Florida State House of Representatives 83rd District Election, 2000
Party	Candidate	Votes	%
Republican	Jeff Atwater	33,713	57.6
Democratic	Pam Dunston	22,641	38.7
Independent	Michael Danchuk	2,152	3.7

Florida State Senate 25th District Election, 2002
Party	Candidate	Votes	%
Republican	Jeff Atwater	77,855	55.1
Democratic	Bob Butterworth	63,465	44.9

Florida State Senate 25th District Election, 2004
Party	Candidate	Votes	%
Republican	Jeff Atwater (inc.)	150,599	98.9
Write-in	Alex Schraff	1,625	1.1

Florida State Senate 25th District Election, 2008
Party	Candidate	Votes	%
Republican	Jeff Atwater (inc.)	127,769	62.3
Democratic	Linda Bird	72,251	35.2
Green	Anthony Joseph Mauro	5,032	2.5

Florida Chief Financial Officer Election, 2010
Party	Candidate	Votes	%
Republican	Jeff Atwater	2,967,052	57.3
Democratic	Loranne Ausley	2,015,579	38.9
Independent	Tom Stearns	109,192	2.1
Independent	Ken Mazzie	83,959	1.6

Florida Chief Financial Officer Election, 2014
Party	Candidate	Votes	%
Republican	Jeff Atwater (inc.)	3,353,897	58.9
Democratic	William "Will" Rankin	2,337,727	41.1

Party political offices
Preceded by Tom Lee	Republican nominee for Chief Financial Officer of Florida; 2010, 2014	Succeeded by Jimmy Patronis
Florida House of Representatives
Preceded by Sharon Merchant	Member of the Florida House of Representatives from the 83rd district 2000–2002	Succeeded by Carl Domino
Florida Senate
Preceded by Burt Saunders	Member of the Florida Senate from the 25th district 2002–2010	Succeeded by Ellyn Setnor Bogdanoff
Political offices
Preceded by Ken Pruitt	President of the Florida Senate; 2008–2010	Succeeded by Mike Haridopolos
Preceded by Alex Sink	Chief Financial Officer of Florida; 2011–2017	Succeeded by Jimmy Patronis
