= Bill Taylor (Florida politician) =

American politician (1932–2018)

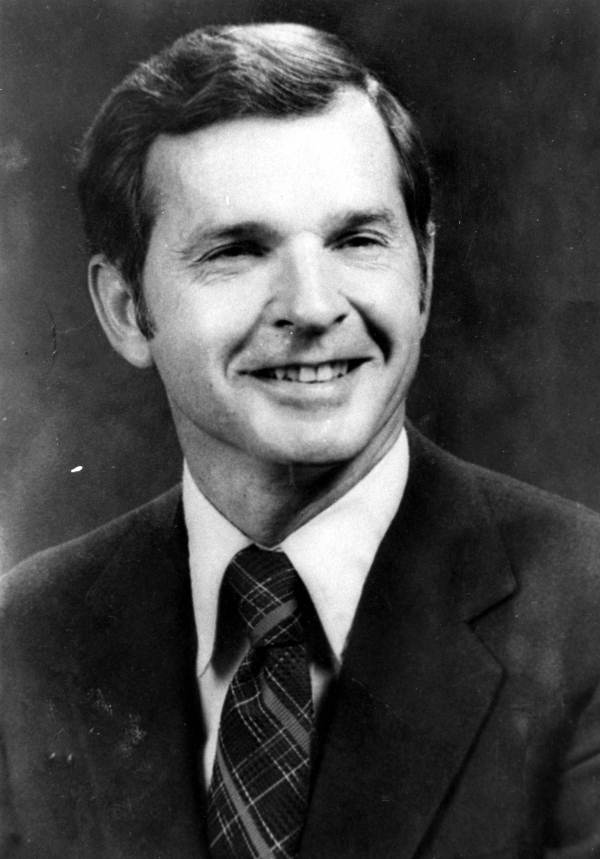

Member of the Florida House of Representatives from the 77th district
- In office November 2, 1976 – November 7, 1978
- Preceded by: Jack Poorbaugh
- Succeeded by: Doc Myers

Personal details
- Born: July 3, 1932 Hartford, Connecticut
- Died: May 4, 2018 (aged 85) Tequesta, Florida
- Party: Democratic
- Spouse: Ann
- Education: University of Florida
- Occupation: Funeral director

Military service
- Allegiance: United States
- Branch/service: United States Coast Guard

William J. Taylor (July 3, 1932 – May 4, 2018) was a Democratic politician from Florida who served as a member of the Florida House of Representatives from the 77th district from 1976 to 1978.
