= Tom Lewis (American politician) =

American politician (1924–2003)

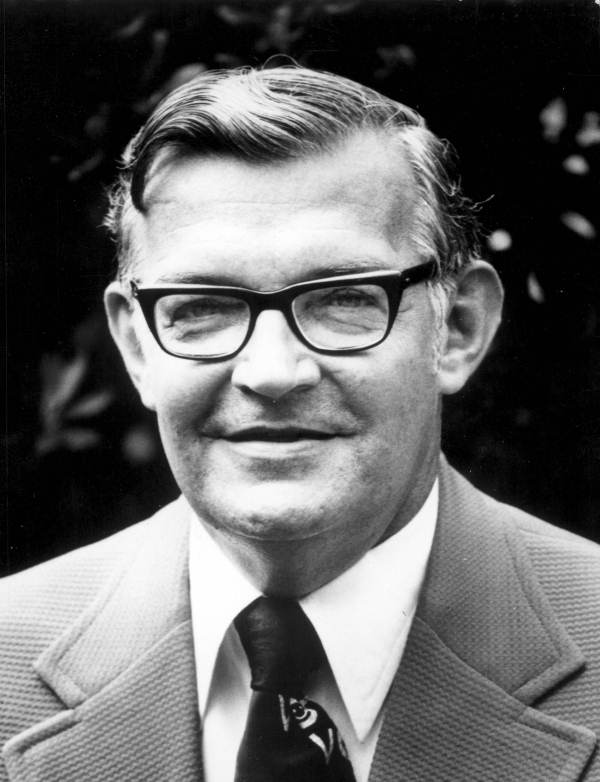

Member of the U.S. House of Representatives from Florida
- In office January 3, 1983 – January 3, 1995
- Preceded by: Skip Bafalis (Redistricting)
- Succeeded by: Mark Foley
- Constituency: 12th district (1983–1993); 16th district (1993–1995)

Member of the Florida Senate from the 27th district
- In office November 4, 1980 – November 2, 1982
- Preceded by: Phil Lewis
- Succeeded by: Doc Myers

Member of the Florida House of Representatives from the 83rd district
- In office November 7, 1972 – November 4, 1980
- Preceded by: George Williamson
- Succeeded by: Frank Messersmith

Personal details
- Born: October 26, 1924 Philadelphia, Pennsylvania
- Died: August 1, 2003 (aged 78) Palm Beach Gardens, Florida
- Party: Republican
- Spouse: Marian Lewis

Military service
- Allegiance: United States
- Branch/service: United States Army Air Forces; United States Air Force
- Years of service: 1943–1954
- Rank: Master Sergeant
- Battles/wars: World War II; Korean War

Thomas F. Lewis (October 26, 1924 – August 1, 2003) was a Republican member of the United States House of Representatives from Florida.

== Formative years ==
Born in Philadelphia, Pennsylvania on October 26, 1924, Lewis attended the St. Edwards School and graduated from Central High School in 1942. During World War II, he served in the U.S. Army Air Forces as a gunner aboard a B-25 bomber, and continued service in the U.S. Air Force on the ground in the Korean War, being discharged at the rank of master sergeant in 1954.

Lewis attended Palm Beach Junior College, and graduated from the University of Florida with a business degree in 1959.

== Career ==
For seventeen years, Lewis was an executive with the aircraft company Pratt & Whitney, followed by work in real estate investment. He entered politics in 1964 when he was elected councilman and mayor of North Palm Beach. He was elected to the Florida House of Representatives in 1972, where he served four terms, and to the Florida Senate in 1980.

In 1982, he was first elected to the U.S. House of Representatives from Florida's 12th district (later the 16th district after redistricting in 1990), defeating Apollo 15 astronaut Alfred Worden in the Republican primary. He would be reelected five times before retiring in 1994.

== Illness and death ==
Lewis died of heart failure following surgery on August 1, 2003, in Palm Beach Gardens, Florida. He was survived by his wife, Marian, who was also a Florida state legislator.

U.S. House of Representatives
Preceded by Clay Shaw	Member of the U.S. House of Representatives from Florida's 12th congressional district 1983–1993	Succeeded by Charles Canady
Preceded by Lawrence J. Smith	Member of the U.S. House of Representatives from Florida's 16th congressional district 1993–1995	Succeeded by Mark Foley
