= Adam Fetterman =

American politician

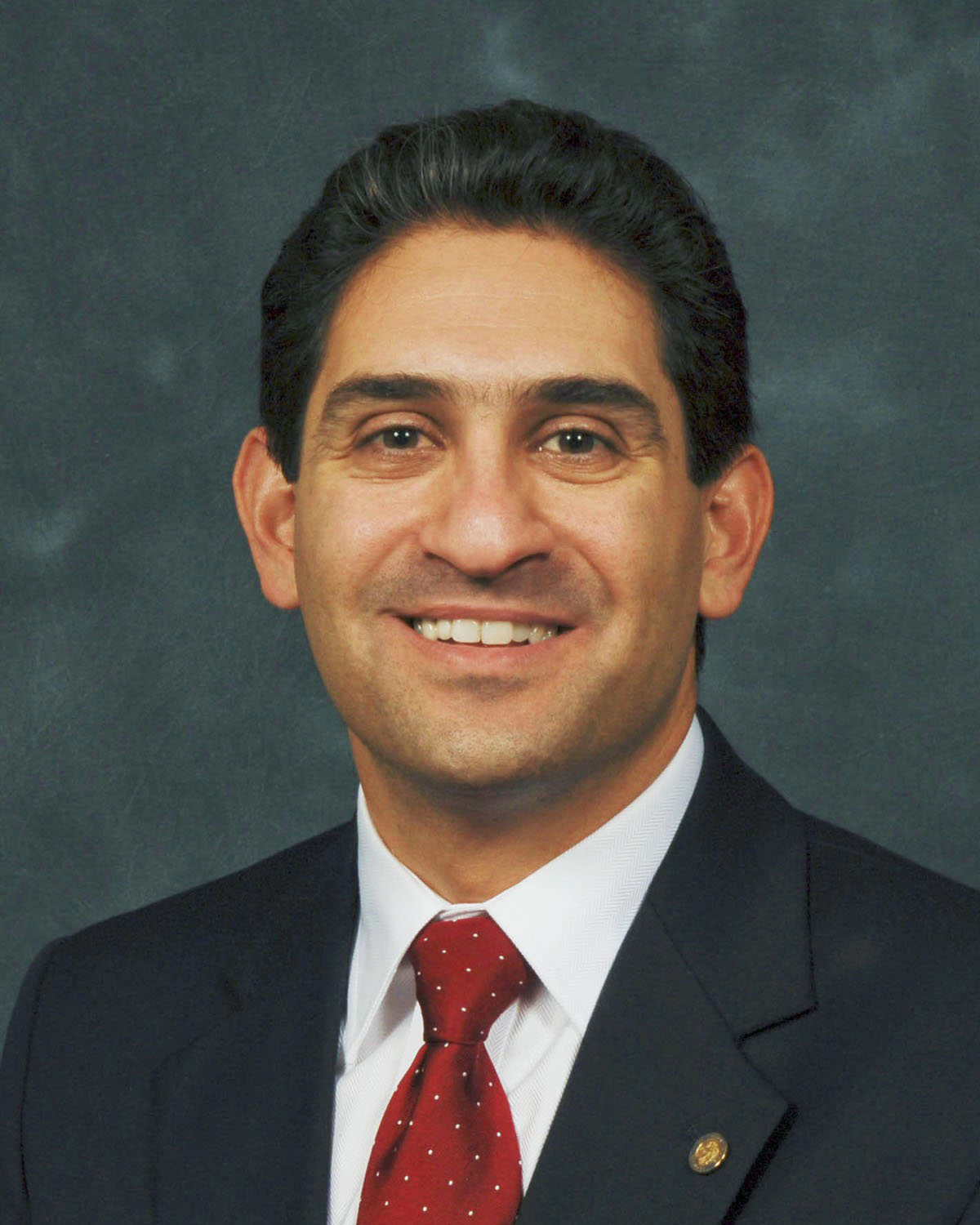

Member of the Florida House of Representatives from the 81st district
- In office November 4, 2008 – November 2, 2010
- Preceded by: Gayle Harrell
- Succeeded by: Gayle Harrell

Personal details
- Born: October 17, 1970 (age 55) New Rochelle, New York, U.S.
- Party: Democratic
- Spouse: Mindi
- Children: 1
- Education: Brandeis University (BA); University of Miami (JD)
- Profession: Attorney

Adam Fetterman (born October 16, 1970) is an attorney and Democratic Party politician in Palm City, Florida, who served as the representative for District 81 of the Florida House of Representatives from 2008–2010.

Fetterman was born in New Rochelle, New York October 16, 1970 and moved to Florida in 1973. He graduated from Palm Beach Gardens High School and earned his Bachelor of Arts degree in anthropology at Brandeis University in 1992, after serving served as President of the Society Organized Against Racism and Brandeis and being a Founding Father, Massachusetts Beta Chapter, Phi Kappa Psi fraternity. He later earned his Juris Doctor from the University of Miami School of Law in 1998, where he served as Editor-in-Chief of the University of Miami Business Law Journal.

In 2003, Fetterman was recognized by the Boys and Girls Clubs of Florida as the new board member of the year for his efforts to reorganize the fundraising model for the organization. He served as the General Counsel for the St. Lucie County Sheriff's Office from 2006 to 2023.

Fetterman was defeated in his bid for re-election in 2010 by Gayle B. Harrell.

Fetterman is Jewish.

In 2012, Fetterman, along with his wife Mindi, founded the Inner Truth Project, a non-profit center where survivors of sexual violence can share their experiences in a safe environment and promote healing.
