= Joseph Humphrey =

American politician (1930–2002)

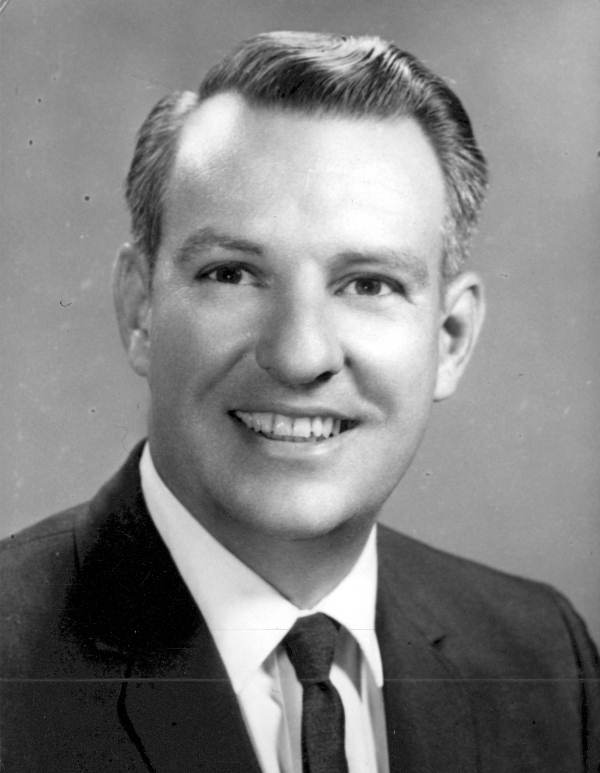
- Humphrey in 1966

Member of the Florida House of Representatives from Palm Beach County
- In office 1966–1967

Member of the Florida House of Representatives from the 77th district
- In office 1967–1968
- Preceded by: District established
- Succeeded by: Jack Poorbaugh

Personal details
- Born: Joseph William Henry Humphrey; November 24, 1930 Ellwood City, Pennsylvania, U.S.
- Died: February 10, 2002 (aged 71)
- Party: Republican
- Education: Duke University; University of Miami Law School

Joseph William Henry Humphrey (November 24, 1930 – February 10, 2002) was an American politician. He served as a Republican member for the 77th district of the Florida House of Representatives.

== Life and career ==
Humphrey was born in Ellwood City, Pennsylvania. He attended Duke University and the University of Miami Law School.

In 1966, Humphrey was elected to the Florida House of Representatives. The next year, he was elected as the first representative for the newly-established 77th district. He served until 1968, when he was succeeded by Jack Poorbaugh.

Humphrey died in February 2002, at the age of 71.
