= Lawrence J. Smith =

American politician (1941–2026)

Larry Smith
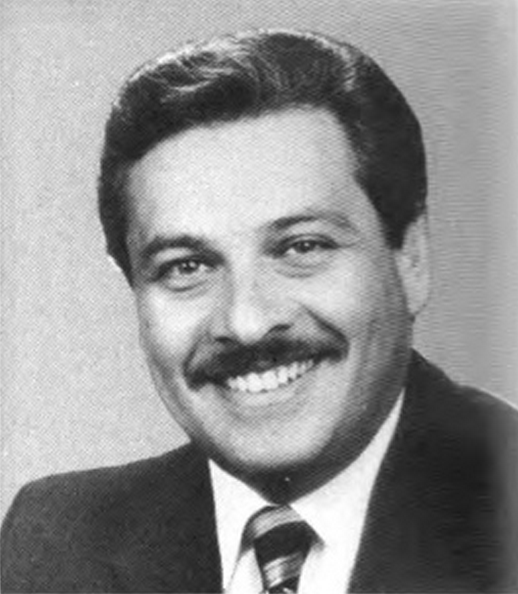

Member of the U.S. House of Representatives from Florida's 16th district
- In office January 3, 1983 – January 3, 1993
- Preceded by: Constituency established
- Succeeded by: Tom Lewis

Member of the Florida House of Representatives from the 96th district
- In office November 21, 1978 – November 16, 1982
- Preceded by: Charles Boyd
- Succeeded by: Thomas Armstrong

Personal details
- Born: Lawrence Jack Smith; April 25, 1941 New York City, U.S.
- Died: May 6, 2026 (aged 85) Hollywood, Florida, U.S.
- Party: Democratic
- Spouse: Sheila Cohen
- Children: 2
- Education: New York University (attended); Brooklyn Law School (LLB)

Lawrence Jack Smith (April 25, 1941 – May 6, 2026) was an American politician, lawyer and lobbyist, who was a five-term member of the United States House of Representatives from Florida, having served from 1983 to 1993.

== Life and career ==
=== Early life and education ===
Lawrence Jack Smith was born in New York City on April 25, 1941. He attended public schools in East Meadow, New York. Smith attended New York University in New York City from 1958 to 1961. He graduated with a Bachelor of Laws (later converted to a Juris Doctor) from Brooklyn Law School in 1964. Smith was admitted to the New York bar in 1964 and he commenced practice in New York City. In 1972, he was admitted to the Florida bar, and from 1974 until 1978, he was chairman of the Hollywood (Fl.) Planning and Zoning Board.

=== Political career ===
From 1978 until 1982, he served in the Florida House of Representatives.

Smith was a delegate to seven Democratic National Conventions from 1980 to 2004.

He was elected as a Democrat to the 98th United States Congress and to the four succeeding Congresses. He served from January 3, 1983, until January 3, 1993. He was not a candidate for renomination in 1992 to the 103rd United States Congress.

=== Later career ===
Smith announced his retirement from Congress after revelations of bounced checks in connection with the House banking scandal and improper use of campaign funds. He pleaded guilty on May 25, 1993, to one count each of tax evasion and filing false campaign reports and was sentenced to three months in prison.

He last resided in Hollywood, Florida, having practiced law in New York and Florida. He operated his own law offices which were based in Fort Lauderdale, Florida, Tallahassee, Florida, and Washington, D.C. From 2012 until his retirement he practiced law with the law firm of Kelley Kronenberg serving as Special Counsel and Government Relations Liaison in Fort Lauderdale.

=== Death ===
Smith died in Hollywood, Florida, on May 6, 2026, at the age of 85.

== See also ==
- List of Jewish members of the United States Congress
- List of federal political scandals in the United States

U.S. House of Representatives
New constituency	Member of the U.S. House of Representatives from Florida's 16th congressional district 1983–1993	Succeeded by Tom Lewis
