= Jack Poorbaugh =

American politician (1919–1987)

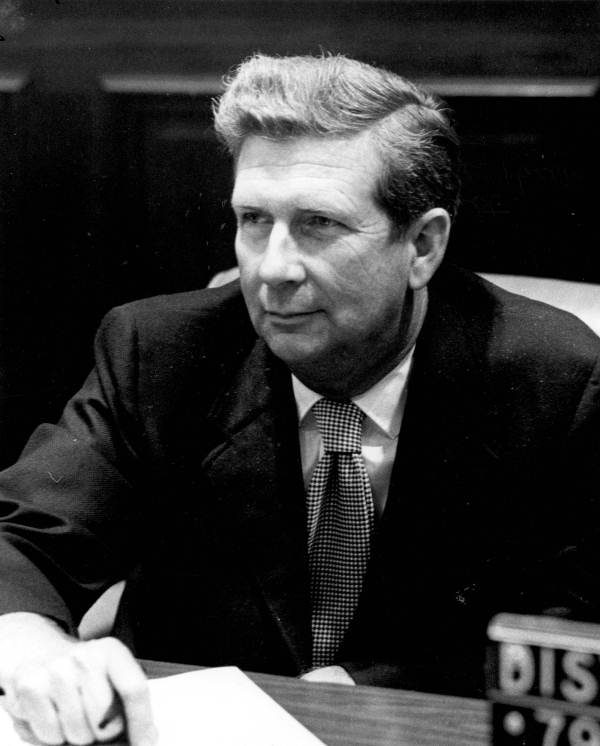
- Poorbaugh in 1972

Member of the Florida House of Representatives
- In office March 28, 1967 – November 2, 1976
- Preceded by: District established
- Succeeded by: Bill Taylor
- Constituency: 78th District (1967–1968); 77th District (1968–1976)

Personal details
- Born: November 3, 1919 Cleveland, Ohio, U.S.
- Died: June 17, 1987 (aged 67) Brooksville, Florida, U.S.
- Party: Republican
- Spouse: Patty Sue
- Children: 5
- Education: Case Western Reserve University; Washington University in St. Louis

Jack M. Poorbaugh (November 3, 1919 – June 17, 1987) was an American politician. He served as a Republican member for the 77th and 78th district of the Florida House of Representatives.

Poorbaugh was born in Cleveland, Ohio. Poorbaugh attended Case Western Reserve University and graduated from Washington University in St. Louis. Poorbaugh served in the United States Marine Corps during World War II. After being discharged, he served as an investigator for the United States Senate. He also worked as a general contractor. He moved to Florida in 1960.

In 1967, Poorbaugh was elected as the first representative for the newly-established 78th district of the Florida House of Representatives. He served until 1968, when he was succeeded by Bill James. In the same year, he was elected to represent the 77th district, succeeding Joseph Humphrey. He served until 1976, when he was succeeded by Bill Taylor.

Poorbaugh died in June 1987 in Brooksville, Florida, at the age of 67.
