= Yvette Benarroch =

American politician from Florida

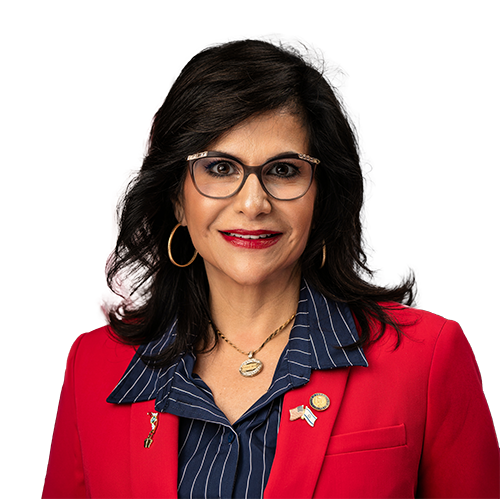
- Official portrait, c. 2024

Member of the Florida House of Representatives from the 81st district
- Incumbent
- Assumed office November 5, 2024
- Preceded by: Bob Rommel

Personal details
- Born: June 5, 1970 (age 56) San Juan, Puerto Rico
- Party: Republican
- Education: Interamerican University of Puerto Rico; Southern New Hampshire University
- Occupation: Politician; realtor
- Website: Official website

Military service
- Branch/service: United States Air Force
- Years of service: 1990–1992
- Battles/wars: Gulf War

Yvette Benarroch (born June 5, 1970) is a Hispanic American politician, realtor, and Air Force veteran who serves as a Republican member of the Florida House of Representatives from the 81st district; representing western parts of Collier County.

== Early life and education ==
Benarroch was born on June 5, 1970, in San Juan, Puerto Rico. She earned her bachelor's degree from Interamerican University of Puerto Rico and received her masters from Southern New Hampshire University. Benarroch served in the United States Air Force during the Gulf War from 1990 to 1992 participating in Operation Desert Shield/Desert Storm. She was awarded National Defense Service Medal, Air Force Training Ribbon and the Air Force Overseas Long Tour Service Ribbon.

== Florida House of Representatives ==
Benarroch announced her candidacy for the State House in the 2024 Florida House of Representatives election. Her campaign was endorsed by Senators Marco Rubio and Rick Scott prior to winning the August primary with 56% of the vote. Benarroch went on to defeat Democratic nominee Charles Work in the general election with 68% of the vote; a gain for Republicans. She was sworn into office on November 19, 2024.

== Personal life ==
Benarroch is Jewish. She moved to Florida in 2003 and lives in Marco Island.

Florida House of Representatives
Preceded by Kelly Skidmore	Member of the Florida House of Representatives from the 81st district 2024–present	Incumbent
