= Sharon Merchant =

American politician

Sharon J. Merchant
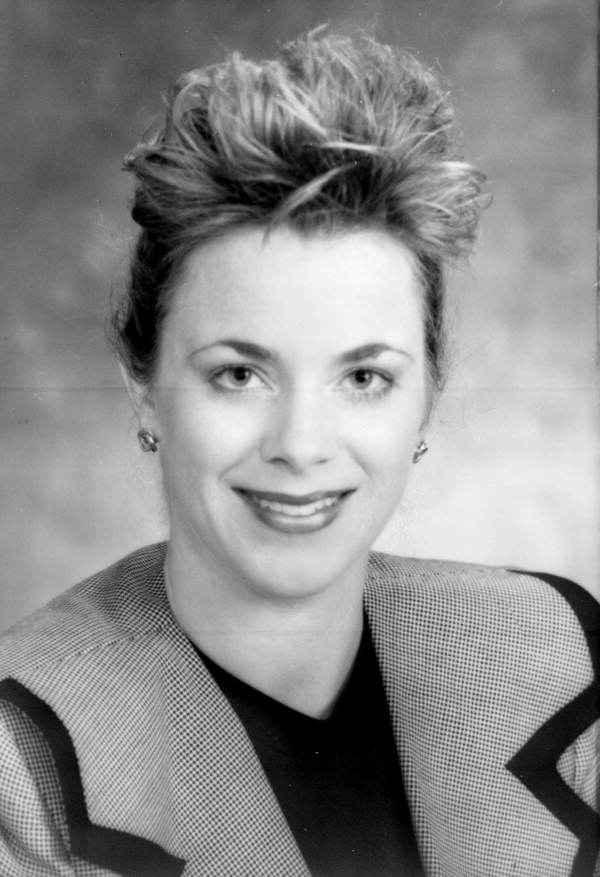
- Merchant in 1992

Member of the Florida House of Representatives from the 83rd district
- In office November 3, 1992 – November 7, 2000
- Preceded by: Marian Lewis (redistricting)
- Succeeded by: Jeff Atwater

Personal details
- Born: August 30, 1963 (age 62) West Palm Beach, Florida, U.S.
- Party: Republican
- Education: Florida State University

Sharon J. Merchant (born August 30, 1963) is an American politician in the state of Florida. She was a representative in the Florida House of Representatives for the 83rd district from 1992 to 2000.

== Early life ==
Merchant was born on August 30, 1963, in West Palm Beach, Florida. She received a bachelor's degree in international affairs, with a double minor in Spanish and business, from Florida State University in 1986. She worked as a legislative aide to Marian Lewis and as executive vice president for an equipment rental service.

== Political career ==
Merchant was first elected to the Florida House of Representatives for the 83rd district in the 1992 general election. While in office, she served as the chair of the appropriations committee on transportation and economic development, the Palm Beach County Legislative Delegation, and as vice chair of the Republican caucus. She unsuccessfully ran for the Florida Senate in 2000, 2002, and 2010.

== Later life ==
After leaving office, Merchant became the president of The Merchant Strategy Inc., a political consultancy, and was later appointed as a board member of the Palm Beach Gardens Medical Center.
