= 1994 Florida Attorney General election =

- November 8, 1994
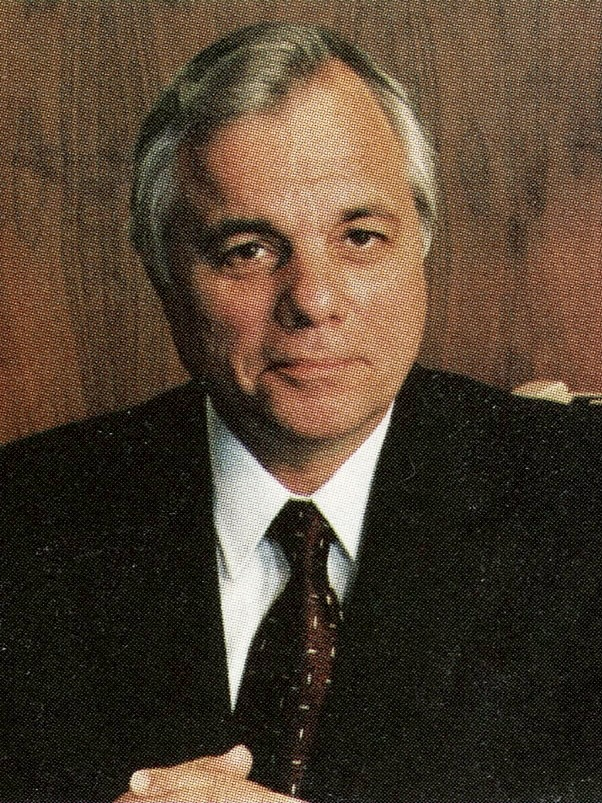

Nominee	Bob Butterworth	Henry Ferro
Party	Democratic	Republican
Popular vote	2,312,010	1,709,139
Percentage	57.5%	42.5%
- Butterworth: 50–60% 60–70% 70–80% 80–90% >90% Ferro: 50–60% 60–70% 70–80% 80–90% >90% Tie: 50% No votes
Attorney General before election
Bob Butterworth
Democratic
Elected Attorney General
Bob Butterworth
Democratic

The 1994 Florida Attorney General election was held on November 8, 1994. Democratic incumbent Bob Butterworth defeated Republican nominee Henry Ferro with 57.50% of the vote.

== Candidates ==
=== Democratic ===
- Bob Butterworth

=== Republican ===
- Henry Ferro

== General Election ==
=== Results ===
1994 Florida Attorney General election
Party	Candidate	Votes	%	±%
Democratic	Bob Butterworth	2,312,010	57.50%	
Republican	Henry Ferro	1,709,139	42.50%	
Democratic hold		Swing		
