= Doc Myers =

American politician (1930–2010)

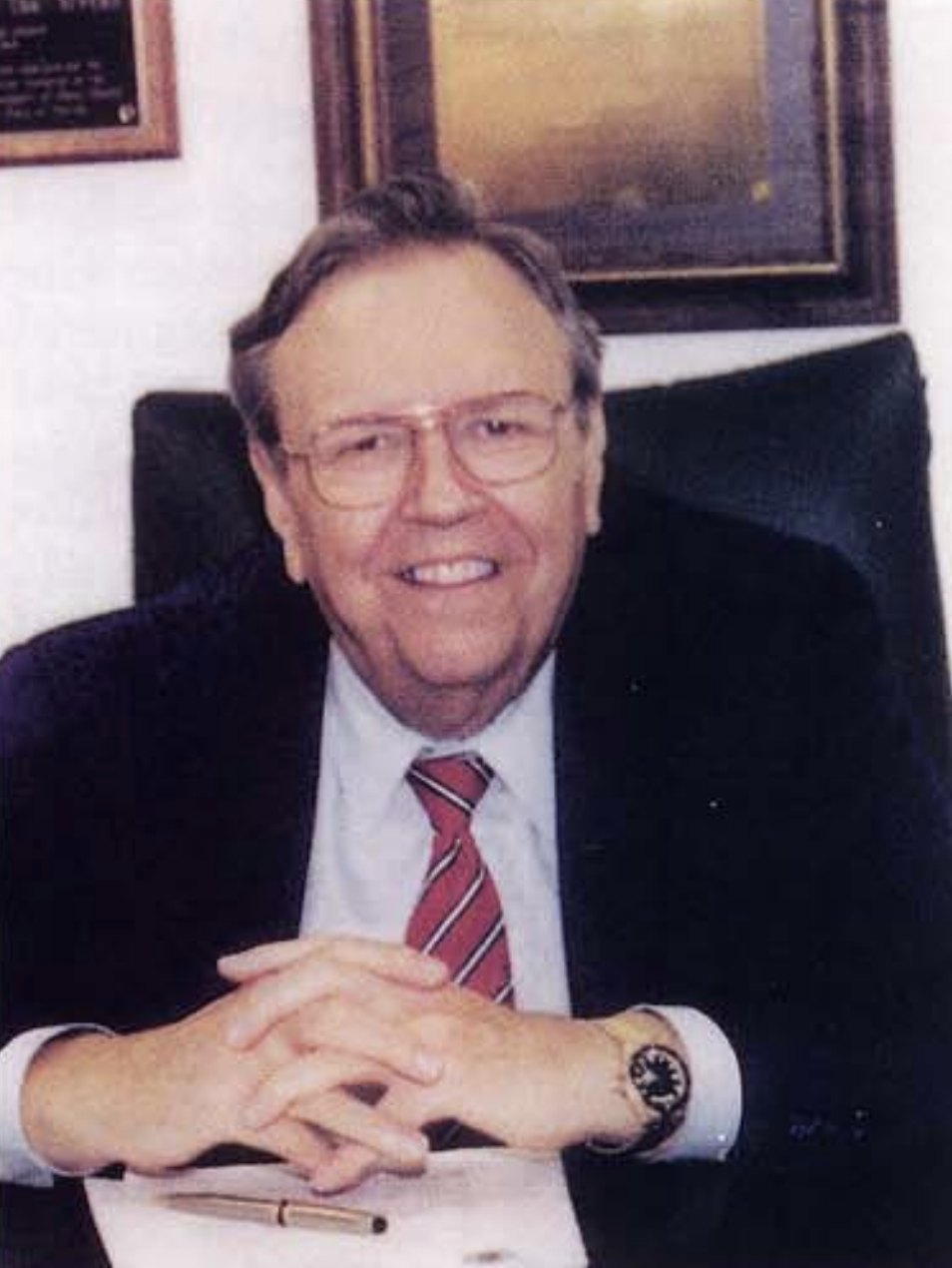

Member of the Florida Senate from the 27th district
- In office November 2, 1982 – November 7, 2000
- Preceded by: Tom Lewis
- Succeeded by: Ken Pruitt

Member of the Florida House of Representatives from the 77th district
- In office November 7, 1978 – November 2, 1982
- Preceded by: Bill Taylor
- Succeeded by: James Hill (redistricting)

Personal details
- Born: September 28, 1930 Kittanning, Pennsylvania
- Died: May 25, 2010 (aged 79) Jupiter, Florida
- Party: Republican
- Spouse: Carol Anne Edgar
- Children: 6
- Education: University of Pittsburgh (B.S., M.D.)
- Occupation: Physician

William G. "Doc" Myers (September 28, 1930 – May 25, 2010) was a Republican politician from Florida who served as a member of the Florida House of Representatives from the 77th district from 1978 to 1982 and as a member of the Florida Senate from the 27th district from 1982 to 2000.

Myers was elected to the Florida House of Representatives in 1978, defeating incumbent Democratic State Representative Bill Taylor. He was re-elected in 1980. In 1982, he briefly ran for governor, but dropped out of the race and successfully ran to succeed State Senator Tom Lewis in the 27th district. Myers served as majority leader in the State Senate from 1994 to 1996 and as president pro tempore from 1998 to 2000. He was term-limited in 2000 and unable to seek another term, and was succeeded by Ken Pruitt. Myers died on May 25, 2010.
