= Patrick Murphy (Florida politician) =

American politician (born 1983)

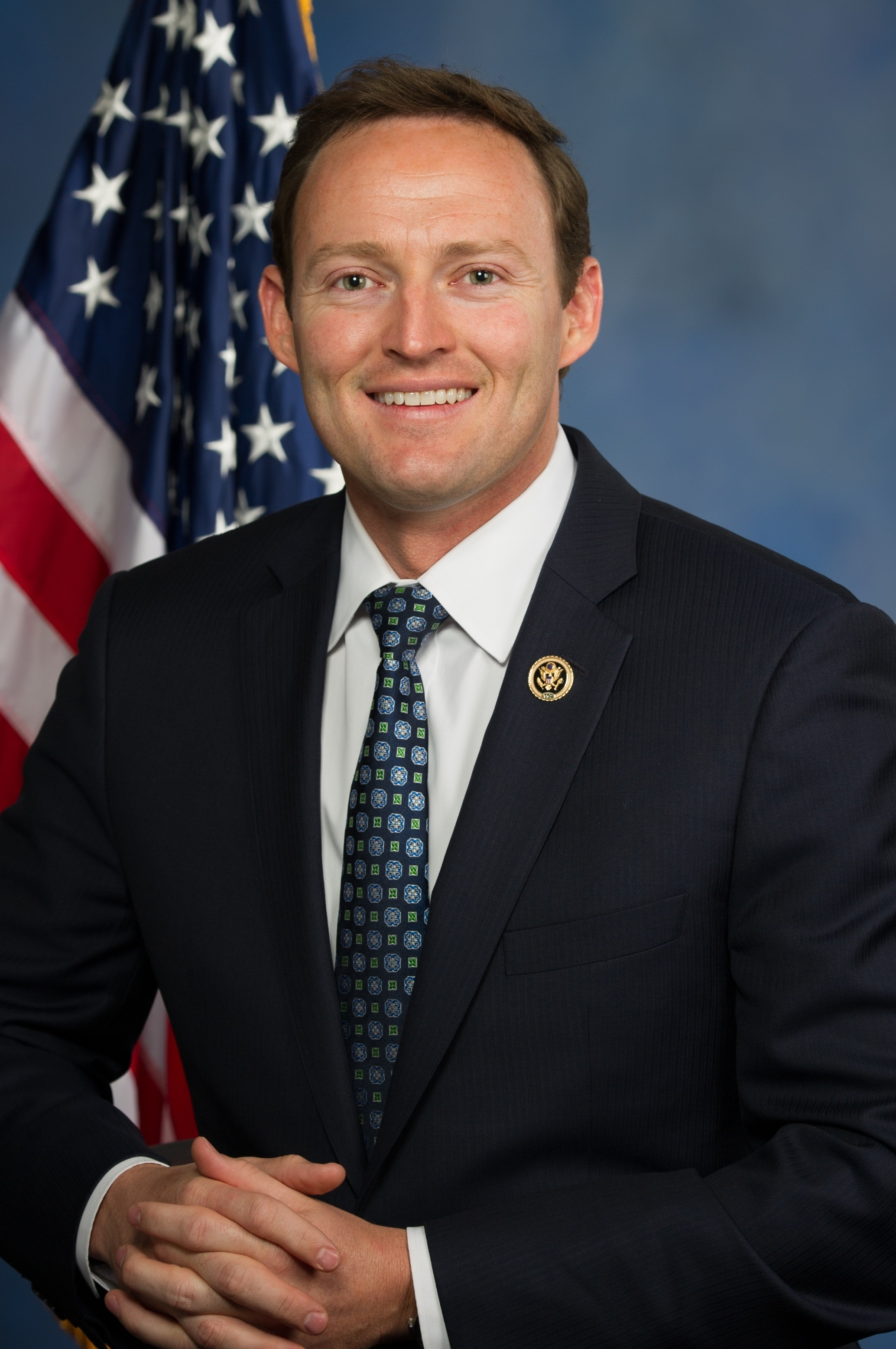
- Official portrait, 2015

Member of the U.S. House of Representatives from Florida's 18th district
- In office January 3, 2013 – January 3, 2017
- Preceded by: Tom Rooney (redistricted)
- Succeeded by: Brian Mast

Personal details
- Born: Patrick Erin Murphy; March 30, 1983 (age 43) Miami, Florida, U.S.
- Party: Republican (before 2011); Democratic (2011–present)
- Spouse: Samantha Drew (m. 2022)
- Education: University of Miami (BA)

Patrick Erin Murphy (born March 30, 1983) is an American businessman, accountant, and politician. A Democrat, he served as the U.S. representative from Florida's 18th congressional district from 2013 to 2017. He is a former Republican, having switched parties in 2011.

Murphy was elected to the House of Representatives in 2012, defeating Republican incumbent Allen West by 0.8% in the second-most expensive U.S. House race in history. Despite the narrow Republican lean of Murphy's district, he was re-elected with 59.8% of the vote in 2014. In March 2015, he announced his intentions to run in the 2016 United States Senate election in Florida; in August 2016 he won the Democratic primary. He faced Republican incumbent Marco Rubio in the November general election, losing 52% to 44%.

== Early life and education ==
Murphy was born in Miami and raised in Key Largo, the son of Tom Murphy Jr., a construction company CEO, and his second wife, Kathleen. Murphy's parents divorced when he was a child, and Murphy was later adopted by his father's third wife, Leslie. Murphy graduated from Palmer Trinity School in Miami and then went on to take a post-graduate year at the Lawrenceville School, a private prep school in Lawrenceville, New Jersey, during the 2001–2002 school year.

As a 19-year-old freshman college student in 2003, Murphy was arrested outside a Miami Beach nightclub on charges of disorderly intoxication and possessing a fake driver's license. The charges were ultimately dropped. Murphy called the incident "the biggest mistake of my life" and the "biggest learning experience of my life."

Murphy studied business administration at the University of Miami, earning a bachelor's degree with dual majors in finance and accounting in 2006. (In the past, Murphy's official biographies said that he had dual degrees, but in fact he earned a single degree with dual majors; Murphy's campaign said that the error was "inadvertent" and corrected the biographies.)

Murphy worked for his family's construction business as a construction laborer beginning at age 19, and then in the company's estimating and purchasing departments and as an assistant project engineer.

== Business career ==
After college, Murphy worked for his father's business, Coastal Construction, for about a year before spending two and a half years (from September 2007 to May 2010) working as an auditor for Deloitte and Touche in Miami.

After passing the Certified Public Accountant (CPA) examination, he chose to become certified in Colorado, because his degree had insufficient credits to meet Florida's higher education requirement. After obtaining certification in September 2009, he was promoted from "audit assistant" to "audit senior" at Deloitte. Politico reported that Murphy had overstated his experience as an accountant, saying he had worked for "several years" as an accountant when in fact he worked as a practicing CPA for less than a year, although he did much of the same accounting work as others at the firm.

He was hired, in May 2010, as vice president of his family's construction business. After the 2010 BP oil spill, he was tasked with creating a subsidiary of his father's company, called Coastal Environmental, that secured contracts to remove oil in the Gulf of Mexico. Murphy served as vice president of Coastal Environmental, and was one of its three directors from 2010 to 2012 (after being elected to Congress, Murphy stepped down as a director but remained an owner). As vice president, he ran the company's day-to-day operations for six months, until October 2010, when the Coast Guard called off oil skimming operations in the Gulf. PolitiFact.com found that "Murphy's description of his past employment is based on actual circumstances, but at times he omits a full explanation."

A 2011 gift of stock from his father boosted his personal net worth by $1–5 million. His father also gave $100,000 to key Democrats the same year he started to consider running for Congress.

In 2021, Murphy launched an artificial intelligence company for construction estimating called Togal.AI. In 2023, Construction Dive reported that Togal.AI raised $5 million in a pre-Series A SAFE round with a $50 million valuation cap. The funding was led by Tampa, Florida-based venture capital firm Florida Funders, along with investors including executives from Facebook parent Meta and Goldman Sachs.

== U.S. House of Representatives ==
=== Elections ===
==== 2012 ====
In 2012, Murphy moved from Fort Lauderdale to Jupiter and ran for the 18th congressional district. The district had previously been the 16th District, represented by Republican Tom Rooney. It had historically been one of the more Republican districts in South Florida, having been in Republican hands for all but one term since its creation in 1973 (it had been the 10th from 1973 to 1983, the 12th from 1983 to 1993, and the 16th from 1993 to 2013). However, it had been made significantly more compact in the 2010 round of redistricting, losing most of its heavily Republican western portion to the new 17th district. Rooney opted to run in the 17th, leaving the 18th as an open seat.

In the general election, Murphy faced Republican incumbent Allen West, a freshman congressman who ran for reelection in the 18th after his former district, the 22nd, had been made significantly more Democratic in redistricting. In the general election, Murphy said that he was so taken aback by some of the things West was saying in Congress and on television that he felt compelled to run against him. West had called Democrats "Communists", said that Social Security was "akin to slavery", and had fired a pistol near a prisoner's head when serving in the Iraq War. Murphy was supported by Florida's former Republican Governor Charlie Crist and former Democratic President Bill Clinton, along with Republican Sheriff of Martin County Bob Crowder, who ran against West in the primaries. The race was among the most expensive congressional races in 2012, and called one of the ugliest in the 2012 campaign, as well as one of the closest.

Murphy was officially certified as the victor over West several days after the election, with a margin of 2,429 votes. West initially indicated that his campaign would seek to challenge the results, but he conceded defeat after Murphy's victory became apparent.

==== 2014 ====
Murphy ran for re-election in 2014, and was a member of the Democratic Congressional Campaign Committee's Frontline program, designed to protect their most vulnerable incumbents. Despite this, he won his bid for a second term by defeating Republican candidate Carl Domino, a former State Representative, 60% to 40%, even out-polling Republican Governor Rick Scott in the heavily Republican Martin County, which he carried with 55.4% of the vote. He raised and spent over $5.3 million, more than any other House Democrat who ran for re-election. Of his 13 television advertisements, none of them attacked his Republican opponent.

=== Committee assignments ===
- Committee on Financial Services
  - Subcommittee on Capital Markets and Government-Sponsored Enterprises
  - Subcommittee on Monetary Policy and Trade
- Permanent Select Committee on Intelligence
  - Subcommittee on Department of Defense, Intelligence and Overhead Architecture
  - Subcommittee on the NSA and Cybersecurity

== Political positions ==
Murphy was formerly a member of the Republican Party, donating the maximum individual contribution of $2,300 to Mitt Romney's 2008 presidential campaign and $4,800 to other Republican candidates. Four months prior to announcing his candidacy for Congress, Murphy switched his registration to the Democratic Party and donated $4,000 to a variety of Democratic candidates. He says he switched from being a Republican and a Romney supporter because of his disgust with the Tea Party movement, also citing his opponent Allen West's fiery rhetoric.

Murphy is regarded as one of the more moderate Democrats in Florida's congressional delegation; he describes himself as "fiscally responsible, socially progressive." He was described in The Huffington Post as a "pro-choice, pro-LGBT rights but 'not ultra-liberal' Democrat who values fiscal responsibility." The top five contributors to his campaign committee for the 2013-2014 time period were his family's construction company, professional services firm Deloitte, plumbing company Suntech Plumbing, multinational investment banking firm Goldman Sachs, and the PAC of the liberal foreign policy organization J Street.

At the time he first took office in 2013, Murphy was the youngest member of the House of Representatives, at age 29.

Murphy has been chair of two bipartisan organizations, the United Solutions Caucus and No Labels. In 2023, President Joe Biden appointed Murphy to the President's Export Council, a White House Advisory committee overseeing international trade.

=== Economic policy ===
Murphy condemned the congressional Republicans who forced a government shutdown in 2013 and criticized the Tea Party Republicans who orchestrated the shutdown, writing their threat to force the U.S. into default was irresponsible. He cited the economic damage caused by the shutdown and the interruption to government operations. He did not take his pay during the shutdown, donating it instead to a wounded veterans' organization in his home district.

=== Education ===
In 2014 Murphy was one of 36 members of Congress to sign a letter urging the U.S. House Appropriations Committee to block a U.S. Department of Education proposal to tighten regulation of for-profit universities.

=== Energy and environment ===
In 2013 Murphy voted in support of the Northern Route Approval Act, which would have allowed Congress to unilaterally approve construction of the Keystone Pipeline without the approval of the Obama administration.

Murphy accepts the scientific consensus on climate change and has consistently supported action to combat climate change. He has called for action against toxic algal blooms in south Florida waters. He opposes hydraulic fracturing (fracking) and has voted against a proposal to block federal regulations on fracking. However, he believes that natural gas is a bridge fuel from fossil fuels to renewable energy, and has voted to expedite export approval for liquified natural gas, prompting criticism from some environmentalists.

As of August 2016, Murphy received an 80% lifetime voting rating from the League of Conservation Voters (LCV), an environmental group; this score was "lower than all but one Florida Democrat in the House but higher than all Florida Republicans." The LCV endorsed Murphy in the 2016 Democratic primary for U.S. Senate.

=== Foreign policy ===
Murphy supports the gradual normalization of relations between Cuba and the United States.

In 2014, Murphy broke with most of his party when he became one of seven House Democrats to vote in favor of establishing the United States House Select Committee on Events Surrounding the 2012 Terrorist Attack in Benghazi.

=== Healthcare ===
Murphy supports the Affordable Care Act and voted against its repeal in May 2013. However, in November 2013, he signed on to a Republican-sponsored bill to waive the minimum coverage requirements of the act.

== 2016 U.S. Senate election ==
On March 23, 2015, Murphy ran for the U.S. Senate in 2016. Incumbent Republican Senator Marco Rubio unsuccessfully sought the Republican presidential nomination in 2016, and had initially said he would vacate the seat. However, after dropping out of the presidential race, Rubio reversed himself and decided to run for re-election. The Democratic primary race was contentious and occasionally negative, with Murphy and fellow Democratic Congressman Alan Grayson diverging "occasionally in policy, but drastically in personality." Murphy defeated Grayson in the August 30 primary.

Murphy's father, Thomas Murphy Jr., and the family's construction company contributed $500,000 in early 2016 to a pro-Murphy super PAC, Floridians for a Strong Middle Class. The elder Murphy subsequently gave an additional $1 million to Senate Majority PAC, a Democratic super PAC supporting a number of Democratic Senate candidates, including Murphy.

Murphy and Rubio participated in two debates in October 2016. During the debates, Rubio criticized Murphy's background. Murphy responded by saying "You continue to throw out these lies. They have all been debunked by PolitiFact." PolitiFact responded that "Murphy has exaggerated his credentials, and his opponents have also exaggerated their attacks on Murphy."

Murphy was defeated by Rubio in the general election, 52% to 44%.

== Personal life ==
Murphy is a Catholic and of Irish Catholic heritage. He married model Samantha Drew in 2022.

== Electoral history ==
2012 18th congressional district of Florida elections
Party	Candidate	Votes	%	±%
Democratic	Patrick Murphy	166,799	50.4	+4.7
Republican	Allen West (incumbent)	164,370	49.6	−4.7
Turnout		331,169	100	
Democratic gain from Republican		Swing		

2014 18th congressional district of Florida elections
Party	Candidate	Votes	%	±%
Democratic	Patrick Murphy (incumbent)	151,478	59.8	+9.4
Republican	Carl Domino	101,896	40.2	−9.4
Turnout		253,374	100	
Democratic hold				

2016 United States Senate election in Florida
Party	Candidate	Votes	%	±%
Republican	Marco Rubio (incumbent)	4,822,182	52.0%	+3.1
Democratic	Patrick Murphy	4,105,251	44.3%	+24.1
Libertarian	Paul Stanton	196,188	2.1%	+1.7

U.S. House of Representatives
Preceded by Ileana Ros-Lehtinen	Member of the U.S. House of Representatives from Florida's 18th congressional district 2013–2017	Succeeded by Brian Mast
Honorary titles
Preceded by Aaron Schock	Baby of the House; 2013–2015	Succeeded by Elise Stefanik
Party political offices
Preceded by Kendrick Meek	Democratic nominee for U.S. Senator from Florida (Class 3); 2016	Succeeded by Val Demings
U.S. order of precedence (ceremonial)
Preceded by Steve Southerland as Former U.S. Representative	Order of precedence of the United States as Former U.S. Representative	Succeeded by Carlos Curbelo as Former U.S. Representative
