= Patrick Rooney Jr. =

American politician

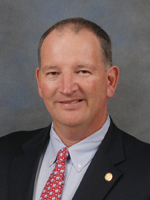

Member of the Florida House of Representatives
- In office November 2, 2010 – November 8, 2016
- Preceded by: Carl Domino
- Succeeded by: Rick Roth
- Constituency: 83rd district (2010–2012); 85th district (2012–2016)

Personal details
- Born: February 9, 1964 (age 62) Pittsburgh, Pennsylvania, U.S.
- Party: Republican
- Spouse: Patricia "Patti" Kulp
- Children: Mary, Frannie, Patrick III, Anthony
- Education: Clemson University (B.A.); Villanova University School of Law (J.D.); Lehigh University (M.B.A.)
- Profession: Businessman

Patrick Rooney Jr. (born February 9, 1964) is a former Republican member of the Florida House of Representatives, representing the 85th District, which includes northern Palm Beach County, from 2012 to 2016. Rooney previously represented the 83rd District from 2010 to 2012.

== History ==
Rooney was born in Pittsburgh, Pennsylvania, to Patrick Rooney Sr., into the wealthy and well-connected Rooney family, which is the majority owner of the Pittsburgh Steelers football team, and includes Dan Rooney, the former United States Ambassador to Ireland, who is Rooney's uncle, and Tom Rooney, a United States Congressman from Florida's 17th congressional district, who is Rooney's brother. He attended Clemson University, where he graduated with a degree in political science in 1986, and later Villanova University School of Law, where he got his law degree in 1989. Afterwards, Rooney attended Lehigh University, where he graduated with a Master of Business Administration in 1992, and then moved to the state of Florida later that year. Since living in Florida, Rooney has managed the Palm Beach Kennel Club, which is heavily involved in gambling and greyhound racing, and served on the South Florida Water Management District Board.

== Florida House of Representatives ==
In 2010, incumbent State Representative Carl Domino could not seek another term due to term limits, instead opting to unsuccessfully run for the Florida State Senate. Rooney ran to replace him in the 83rd District, which spanned across Palm Beach County, and encountered Nancy Cardone and Francisco Rodriguez in the Republican primary, whom he defeated comfortably with 61% of the vote. In the general election, Rooney was opposed by Mark Marciano, the Democratic nominee and an optometrist. He campaigned on making Florida more business-friendly, specifically supporting efforts to lower the corporate income tax rate and to "streamline the permitting and licensing processes." Ultimately, Rooney defeated Marciano in a landslide, winning over 63% of the vote.

When the Florida House districts were redrawn in 2012, Rooney was redistricted into the 85th District, which included most of the territory that he previously represented. He was unopposed in the primary, and in the general election, encountered Democratic nominee David Lutrin, a physical education teacher. Rooney was endorsed for re-election by the Palm Beach Post, which suggested that "he could bring a different tone to a Florida House that has been far too ideological" due to his desire for consensus-building, bipartisan legislation. In the end, he was elected over Lutrin by a solid margin, with 58% of the vote. In 2014, Rooney was re-elected to his third term in the legislature unopposed.
