= James Hill (Florida politician) =

American politician (born 1947)

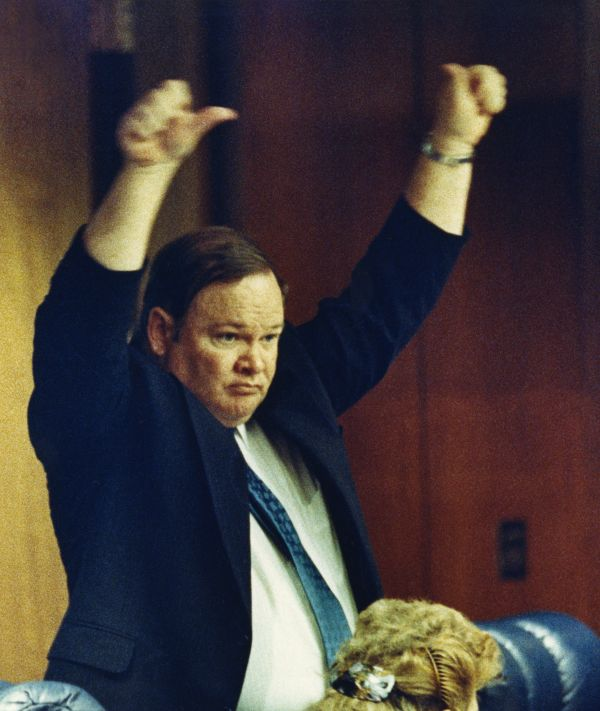

Member of the Florida House of Representatives from the 80th district
- In office November 2, 1982 – November 3, 1992
- Preceded by: Doc Myers (redistricting)
- Succeeded by: Tom Warner (redistricting)

Personal details
- Born: July 22, 1947 (age 79) Atlanta, Georgia
- Party: Republican
- Spouse: Dorothy Schaefgen
- Children: 4
- Relatives: James Clinkscales Hill (father)
- Education: University of Oregon; University of Tennessee (B.S.)
- Occupation: Businessman, real estate agent

James Clinkscales Hill Jr. (born July 22, 1947) is a Republican politician from Florida who served as a member of the Florida House of Representatives from the 80th district from 1982 to 1992.

== Early life ==
Hill, the son of Judge James Clinkscales Hill of the U.S. Court of Appeals for the Eleventh Circuit, wa born in Atlanta, Georgia, in 1947. He attended the University of Oregon before graduating from the University of Tennessee in 1970 with his bachelor's degree in political science. After graduating, Hill moved to Jupiter, Florida, in 1972, where he owned an answering service and unsuccessfully ran for mayor in 1974. He was later elected to the Jupiter City Council and unsuccessfully ran for the Palm Beach County Commission in 1980.

== Florida House of Representatives ==
In 1982, when State Representative Doc Myers ran for the Florida Senate, Hill ran to succeed him in the 80th district. He won the Republican primary, defeating advertising consultant Tim McRoberts in a runoff election. In the general election, he faced David Anderson, the Democratic nominee and dean of students at Indian River Community College, and won, receiving 57 percent of the vote to Anderson's 43 percent. He was challenged by Anderson again in 1984, and won by a wider margin, receiving 66 percent of the vote.

Hill ran for a third term in 1986, and was opposed by Democrat Jeffrey Vorpagel, the former chairman of the Palm Beach County Democratic Party. He defeated Vorpagel in a landslide, winning re-election with 74 percent of the vote. He was unopposed for re-election in 1988.

In 1990, Hill sought a fifth term. He won the Republican primary over former legislative aide Mac McCartney and retiree Herbert Mertz, and faced Democrat Pat Dailer in the general election, who won the Democratic primary over then-Democrat Joe Negron. He won re-election over Dailer, receiving 55 percent of the vote to her 45 percent.

Hill declined to seek a sixth term in 1992, and instead unsuccessfully ran for the Palm Beach County Commission, losing in the Republican primary.
