= Bob Butterworth =

American attorney and politician

Robert Butterworth
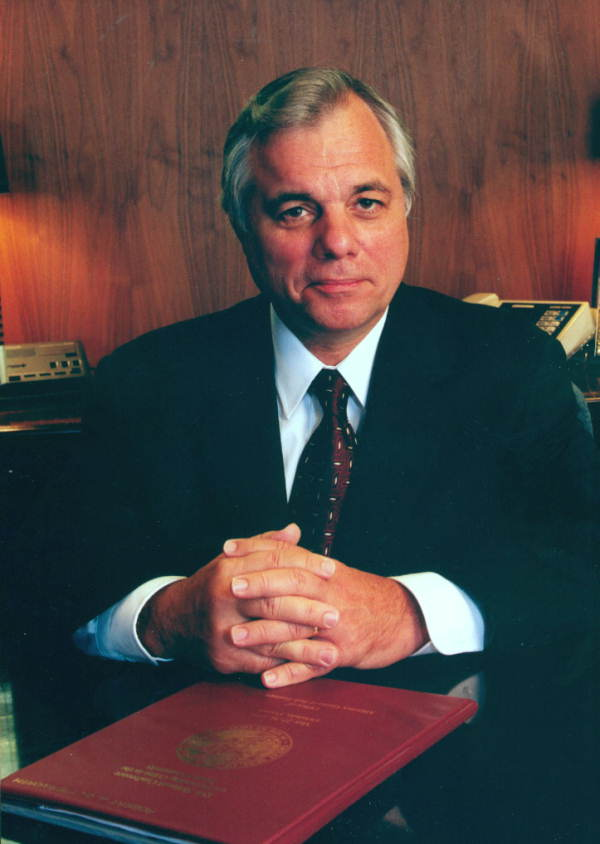

Secretary of the Florida Department of Children and Families
- In office December 19, 2006 – July 29, 2008
- Governor: Charlie Crist
- Preceded by: Lucy Hadi
- Succeeded by: George Sheldon

33rd Attorney General of Florida
- In office January 6, 1987 – November 4, 2002
- Governor: Bob Martinez; Lawton Chiles; Buddy MacKay; Jeb Bush
- Preceded by: James C. Smith
- Succeeded by: Richard E. Doran

Sheriff of Broward County
- In office 1979–1982
- Preceded by: Edward J. Stack
- Succeeded by: George Brescher

Personal details
- Born: August 20, 1942 (age 83) Passaic, New Jersey, U.S.
- Party: Democratic
- Children: 3
- Education: University of Florida (BA); University of Miami (JD)
- Profession: Lawyer

Robert A. Butterworth Jr. (born August 20, 1942) is an American lawyer who served as a judge, sheriff, mayor, public official, and four terms as Florida Attorney General in the state of Florida.

== Early life and career ==
Butterworth was born in Passaic, New Jersey, and moved to Florida with his family as a child. He received a degree in business administration from the University of Florida in 1965, and a Juris Doctor degree from the University of Miami in 1969. He is a member of Tau Kappa Epsilon and previously served on its international board of directors.

Butterworth was a judge in the county and circuit courts of Broward County from 1974 to 78, when he was appointed sheriff of Broward County. He was appointed to head up Florida's Department of Motor Vehicles in 1982 and to be mayor of Sunrise, Florida in 1984.

In 1986, on the eve of his election as attorney general, Butterworth's ex-wife, Saundra, fatally shot their 16-year-old son, Robert A. Butterworth III, and then killed herself on a northeast Miami street. Police said she was mentally ill and had used a gun Butterworth had given her for protection before their divorce in 1976. Butterworth has two surviving children, a daughter, BreAnne and her brother, Brandon.

== Florida Attorney General ==
A Democrat, Butterworth served as the 33rd Attorney General of Florida for four consecutive terms under four governors (both Republican and Democrat): Bob Martinez, Lawton Chiles, Buddy MacKay, and Jeb Bush. He was first elected in 1986 and reelected in 1990, 1994, and 1998. His popularity among voters in the state led to frequent mention of his name as a potential candidate for Governor of Florida or for the U.S. Senate.

=== Capital punishment ===
Butterworth was attorney general during the final years of use of the electric chair in executing death row prisoners. It was notorious for frequent malfunctions in the 1990s, namely in the cases of Jesse Tafero (executed May 4, 1990), Pedro Medina (executed March 25, 1997) and Allen Lee Davis (executed July 8, 1999). Reportedly, six-inch flames shot out of Tafero's head and 12-inch flames shot out of Medina's head, raising the question whether use of the electric chair was cruel and unusual punishment. After the Medina execution, Butterworth commented, "People who wish to commit murder, they'd better not do it in the state of Florida because we may have a problem with the electric chair."

=== Tobacco lawsuit ===
One of Butterworth's key activities during his time in office was the initiation and execution of Florida's lawsuit against the tobacco industry, which was one of the early contributions to what eventually became a nationwide effort. As a result of this suit, tobacco companies agreed to pay $11 billion to the state of Florida.

=== Involvement in the 2000 election ===
Butterworth was the Florida chair of Al Gore's 2000 presidential campaign and chose not to use his capacities as Attorney General to influence court decisions on whether all the votes would be counted, given the obvious conflict of interest that would have been involved in doing so. Butterworth argued in favor of a statewide recount in the media.

Butterworth's Republican counterpart, Florida Secretary of State Katherine Harris, was the Florida chair of George W. Bush's presidential campaign.

== Later activities ==
In 2002, Butterworth ran for Seat 25 in the Florida Senate, in hopes of representing portions of Palm Beach and Broward Counties. He resigned as Attorney General because of Florida's "resign-to-run laws. However, he was defeated by Republican Jeffrey Atwater.

Butterworth was dean of the School of Law at St. Thomas University. On December 19, 2006, governor-elect Charlie Crist named Butterworth as the new secretary of the Florida Department of Children and Families. On July 29, 2008, Secretary Butterworth resigned his post as Secretary of The Department of Children and Families and joined a Fort Lauderdale law firm.

== Electoral history ==
Florida Attorney General election, 1986
Party	Candidate	Votes	%
Democratic	Bob Butterworth	1,900,890	58.63
Republican	Jim Watt	1,341,090	41.37
Total votes		3,241,980	100.0

Florida Attorney General election, 1990
Party	Candidate	Votes	%
Democratic	Bob Butterworth	Unopposed	100.0

Florida Attorney General election, 1994
Party	Candidate	Votes	%
Democratic	Bob Butterworth	2,312,010	57.50
Republican	Henry Ferro	1,709,139	42.50
Total votes		4,021,149	100.0

Florida Attorney General election, 1998
Party	Candidate	Votes	%
Democratic	Bob Butterworth	2,301,328	59.56
Republican	David Bludworth	1,562,269	40.44
Total votes		3,863,597	100.0

Florida State Senate District 25 election, 2002
Party	Candidate	Votes	%
Republican	Jeffrey Atwater	77,855	55.09
Democratic	Bob Butterworth	63,465	44.91
Total votes		141,320	100.0

Party political offices
Preceded by James C. Smith	Democratic nominee for Attorney General of Florida; 1986, 1990, 1994, 1998	Succeeded by Buddy Dyer
