= Florida's 81st House of Representatives district =

Florida district

Florida's 81st State House of Representatives district
Representative
Yvette Benarroch; R–Naples

Florida's 81st House of Representatives district elects one member of the Florida House of Representatives. It contains parts of Collier County.

== Members ==
- Gayle Harrell (2000–2008)
- Adam Fetterman (2008–2010)
- Gayle Harrell (2010–2012)
- Kevin Rader (2012–2016)
- Joseph Abruzzo (2016–2018)
- Tina Polsky (2018–2020)
- Kelly Skidmore (2020–2022)
- Bob Rommel (2022–2024)
- Yvette Benarroch (since 2024)
