= John Healey (disambiguation) =

John Healey (born 1960) is a British politician.

John Healey may also refer to:

- John Healey (rower) (1927–2022), British Olympian
- John Healey (translator) (died 1610), English translator
- John H. Healey (born 1952), American cancer surgeon and researcher
- John P. Healey (1922–2019), American aerospace engineer

== See also ==
- John Healy (disambiguation)
