= Jonathan Healy =

Jonathan Healy may refer to:

- Jonathan Healy (politician)
- Jonathan Healy (taekwondo)

== See also ==
- John Healy (disambiguation)
