= Henry S. Bettenson =

Henry Scowcroft Bettenson (1908, Bolton, Lancashire – 1979) was an English Classical scholar, translator and author. Educated at Bristol University and Oriel College, Oxford; after some years in parish work, he taught Classics for 25 years at Charterhouse, then afterward rector of Purleigh in Essex. Notable works include a translation of Augustine's City of God and Livy's Rome and the Mediterranean. His collection of Early Christian documents, written from an Anglican perspective (hence the emphasis on early councils and on seventeenth century Church of England documents), and history of the Latin fathers remain in print.

== Bibliography ==
- Documents of the Christian Church, O.U.P. World Classics, 1943; second edition 1963; (expanded) 1970; third edition (Chris Maunder), 1999; fourth edition (Chris Maunder), 2010. ISBN 978-0-19-956898-7
- The Early Christian Fathers: from St. Clement of Rome to St Athanasius, Oxford University Press, 1956, 1969. ISBN 978-0-19-283009-8
- The Early Christian Fathers: from St. Cyril of Jerusalem to St. Leo the Great, Oxford University Press, 1970. ISBN 978-0-19-283012-8
