= Mundus Alter et Idem =

Satirical dystopian novel by Joseph Hall c. 1605

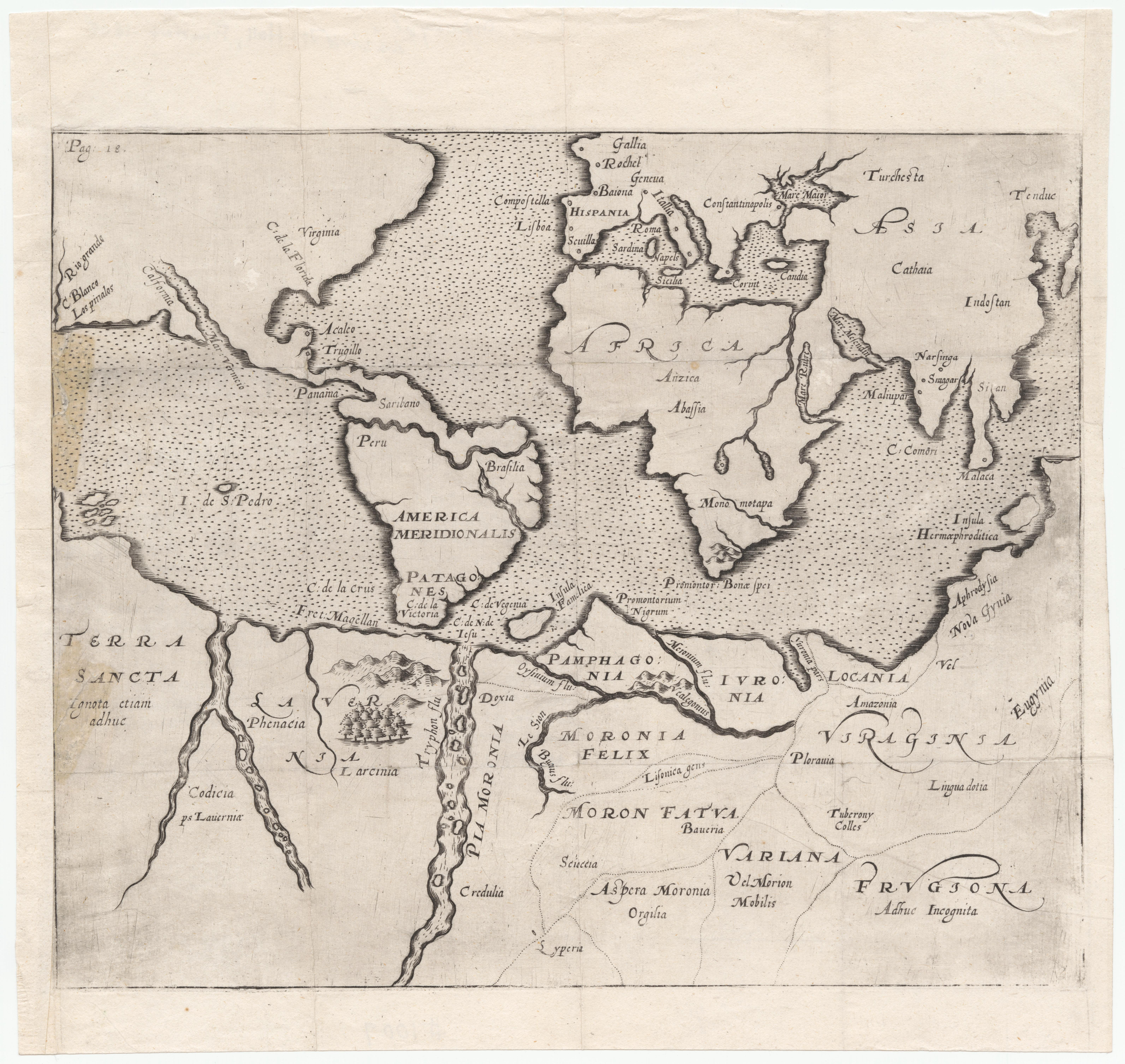
- Map from Mundus alter et idem
- Author: Joseph Hall
- Language: Latin
- Genre: Science fiction, dystopian
- Published: 1666
- Publication place: England

Mundus alter et idem is a satirical dystopian novel written by Joseph Hall c. 1605. The title has been translated into English as An Old World and a New, The Discovery of a New World, and Another World and Yet the Same. Although the text credits "Mercurius Britannicus" as the author, Thomas Hyde ascribed it to Hall in 1674.

== Synopsis ==
The narrator takes a voyage on the ship Fantasia, in the southern seas, visiting the lands of Crapulia, Viraginia, Moronia and Lavernia (populated by gluttons, nags, fools and thieves, respectively). Moronia parodies Roman Catholic customs; in its province Variana is found an antique coin parodying Justus Lipsius, a target for Hall's satire which takes the ad hominem beyond the Menippean model.

== Analysis and influence ==
Mundus alter is a satirical description of London, with some criticism of the Roman Catholic Church, and is said to have furnished Jonathan Swift with hints for Gulliver's Travels. It is classified as a Menippean satire, and was almost contemporary with another such satire by John Barclay, Euphormionis Satyricon, with which it shares the features of being written in Latin (Hall generally wrote in English), and a concern for religious commentary.

== Publication and translation ==
Hall wrote it for private circulation, and did not intend for it to be distributed widely. The book was published by William Knight, who wrote a Latin preface, although it is uncertain which of the contemporaneous clergymen with that name was responsible. It was reprinted in 1643, with Civitas Solis by Tommaso Campanella, and New Atlantis by Francis Bacon.

It was not clearly ascribed to Hall by name until 1674, when Thomas Hyde, the librarian of the Bodleian, identified "Mercurius Britannicus" with Joseph Hall, as is now accepted. Hall's authorship had been an open secret, however, and in 1642 John Milton used it to attack him during the Smectymnuus controversy, employing the argument that the work lacked the constructive approach taken in More's Utopia and Bacon's New Atlantis.

The book was first translated into English by John Healey (1608–9), using the title The Discovery of a New World or A Description of the South Indies, attributed to "English Mercury". It was a free and necessarily unauthorised translation, and involved Hall in controversy. Andrea McCrea describes Hall's interactions with Robert Dallington, and then Healey, against the background of a few years of the pace-setting culture of the court of Henry Frederick, Prince of Wales. Dallington advocated travel, indeed the Grand Tour, while Hall was minatory about its effects; Dallington wrote aphorisms following Lipsius and Guicciardini, while Hall had moved away from the Tacitist strand in humanist thought to the more conservative Senecan tendency with which he was permanently to be associated. Healey embroidered political details into the Mundus alter translation, and outed Hall as author at least as far as his initials, the emphasis on politics again being a Tacitist one. Healey had noble patronage, and Hall's position with respect to the princely court culture was revealed as close to that of the king, placing him as an outsider rather than in the new group of movers and shakers. On the death of Prince Henry, his patron, Hall did preach the funeral sermon to his household.
