= The City of God =

Book by Augustine of Hippo

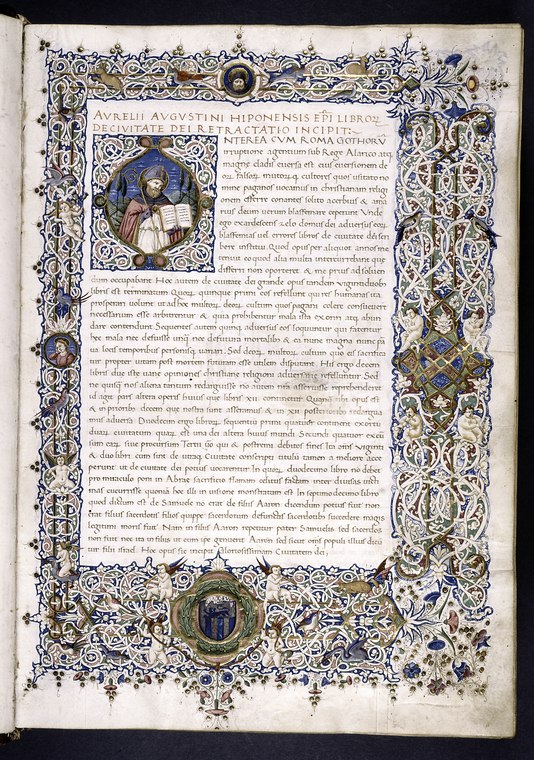
- The City of God, opening text, manuscript c. 1470
- Author: Augustine of Hippo
- Original title: De civitate Dei contra paganos
- Language: Latin
- Subject: Christian philosophy, Christian theology
- Genre: Theology
- Publication date: Completed work published AD 426
- Publication place: Western Roman Empire
- Media type: Manuscript
- Dewey Decimal: 239.3
- LC Class: BR65 .A64
- Original text: De civitate Dei contra paganos at Latin Wikisource
- Translation: The City of God at Wikisource

On the City of God Against the Pagans (Latin: De civitate Dei contra paganos), often called The City of God, is a book of Christian philosophy written in Latin by Augustine of Hippo in the early 5th century AD. Augustine wrote the book to refute allegations that Christianity initiated the decline of Rome and is considered one of his seminal works, standing alongside the Confessions, the Enchiridion, On Christian Doctrine, and On the Trinity. As a work of one of the most influential Church Fathers, The City of God is a cornerstone of Western thought, expounding on many questions of theology, such as the suffering of the righteous, the existence of evil, the conflict between free will and divine omniscience, and the doctrine of original sin.

== Background ==
The sack of Rome by the Visigoths in 410 left Romans in a deep state of shock, and many Romans saw it as punishment for abandoning traditional Roman religion in favor of Christianity. In response to these accusations, and in order to console Christians, Augustine wrote The City of God as an argument for the truth of Christianity over competing religions and philosophies. He argues that Christianity was not responsible for the sack of Rome but instead responsible for Rome's success. Even if the earthly rule of the Empire was imperiled, it was the City of God that would ultimately triumph. Augustine's focus was Heaven, a theme of many Christian works of Late Antiquity. Despite Christianity's designation as the official religion of the Empire, Augustine declared its message to be spiritual rather than political. Christianity, he argued, should be concerned with the mystical, heavenly city, the New Jerusalem, rather than with earthly politics.

The book presents human history as a conflict between what Augustine calls the Earthly City (often colloquially referred to as the City of Man, and mentioned once on chapter 1 of book 15) and the City of God, a conflict that is destined to end in victory for the latter. The City of God is marked by people who forgo earthly pleasure to dedicate themselves to the eternal truths of God, now revealed fully in the Christian faith. The Earthly City, on the other hand, consists of people who have immersed themselves in the cares and pleasures of the present, passing world.

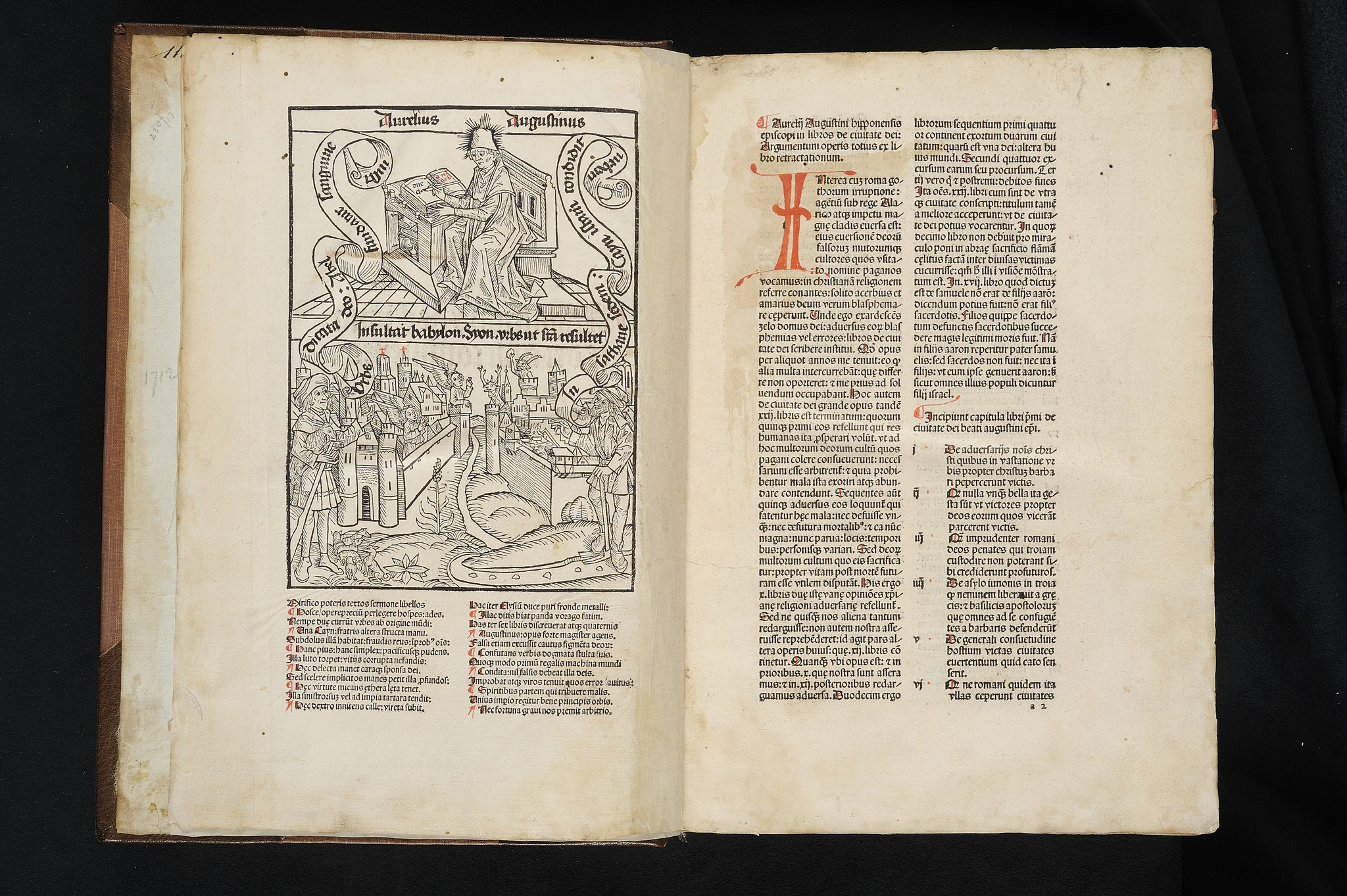
Woodcut depicting Augustine writing The City of God

Augustine's thesis depicts the history of the world as universal warfare between God and the Devil. This metaphysical war is not limited by time but only by geography on Earth. In this war, God moves (by divine intervention, Providence) those governments, political/ideological movements and military forces aligned (or aligned the most) with the Church (the City of God) in order to oppose by all means—including military—those sociopolitical regimes and movements of the Devil (the City of the World).

== Structure ==
- Part I (Books I–X): a polemical critique of Roman religion and philosophy, corresponding to the Earthly City
  - Book I–V: A critique of pagan religion
    - Book I: a criticism of the pagans who attribute the sack of Rome to Christianity despite being saved by taking refuge in Christian churches. The book also explains why good and bad things happen to righteous and wicked people alike, and it consoles the women violated in the recent calamity.
    - Book II: an argument that because of the worship of the pagan gods, Rome suffered the greatest calamity of all, that is, moral corruption.
    - Book III: an argument that the pagan gods failed to save Rome numerous times in the past from worldly disasters, such as the sack of Rome by the Gauls.
    - Book IV: argues that the power and long duration of the Roman empire was due not to the pagan gods but to the Christian God.
    - Book V: an argument against the doctrine of fate and an explanation of the Christian doctrine of free will and its consistency with God's omniscience. The book proves that Rome's dominion was due to the virtue of the Romans and explains the true happiness of the Christian emperors.
  - Book VI–X: A critique of pagan philosophy
    - Book VI: an argument against the assertion that the pagan gods are to be worshipped for eternal life (rather than temporal benefits). Augustine claimed that even the esteemed pagan theologist Varro held the gods in contempt.
    - Book VII: an argument that eternal life is not granted by Janus, Jupiter, Saturn, and other select gods.
    - Book VIII: an argument against the Platonists and their natural theology, which Augustine views as the closest approximation of Christian truth, and a refutation of Apuleius' insistence of the worship of demons as mediators between God and man. The book also contains an argument against Hermeticism.
    - Book IX: argues that all demons are evil and that only Christ can provide man with eternal happiness.
    - Book X: a teaching that the good angels wish that God alone is worshipped and a proof that no sacrifice can lead to purification except that of Christ.
- Part II (Books XI–XXII): discussion on the City of God and its relationship to the Earthly City
  - Books XI–XIV: the origins of the two cities
    - Book XI: the origins of the two cities from the separation of the good and bad angels, and a detailed analysis of Genesis 1.
    - Book XII: answers why some angels are good and others bad, and a close examination of the creation of man.
    - Book XIII: teaching that death originated as a penalty for Adam's sin, the fall of man.
    - Book XIV: teachings on the original sin as the cause for future lust and shame as a just punishment for lust.
  - Books XV–XVIII: the history or progress of the two cities, including foundational theological principles about Jews.
    - Book XV: an analysis of the events in Genesis between the time of Cain and Abel to the time of the flood.
    - Book XVI: the progress of the two cities from Noah to Abraham, and the progress of the heavenly city from Abraham to the kings of Israel.
    - Book XVII: the history of the city of God from Samuel to David and to Christ, and Christological interpretations of the prophecies in Kings and Psalms.
    - Book XVIII: the parallel history of the earthly and heavenly cities from Abraham to the end. Doctrine of Witness, that Jews received prophecy predicting Jesus, and that Jews are dispersed among the nations to provide independent testimony of the Hebrew Scriptures.
  - Books XIX–XXII: the deserved destinies of the two cities.
    - Book XIX: the end of the two cities, and the happiness of the people of Christ.
    - Book XX: the prophecies of the Last Judgment in the Old and New Testaments.
    - Book XXI: the eternal punishment for the city of the devil.
    - Book XXII: the eternal happiness for the saints and explanations of the resurrection of the body.

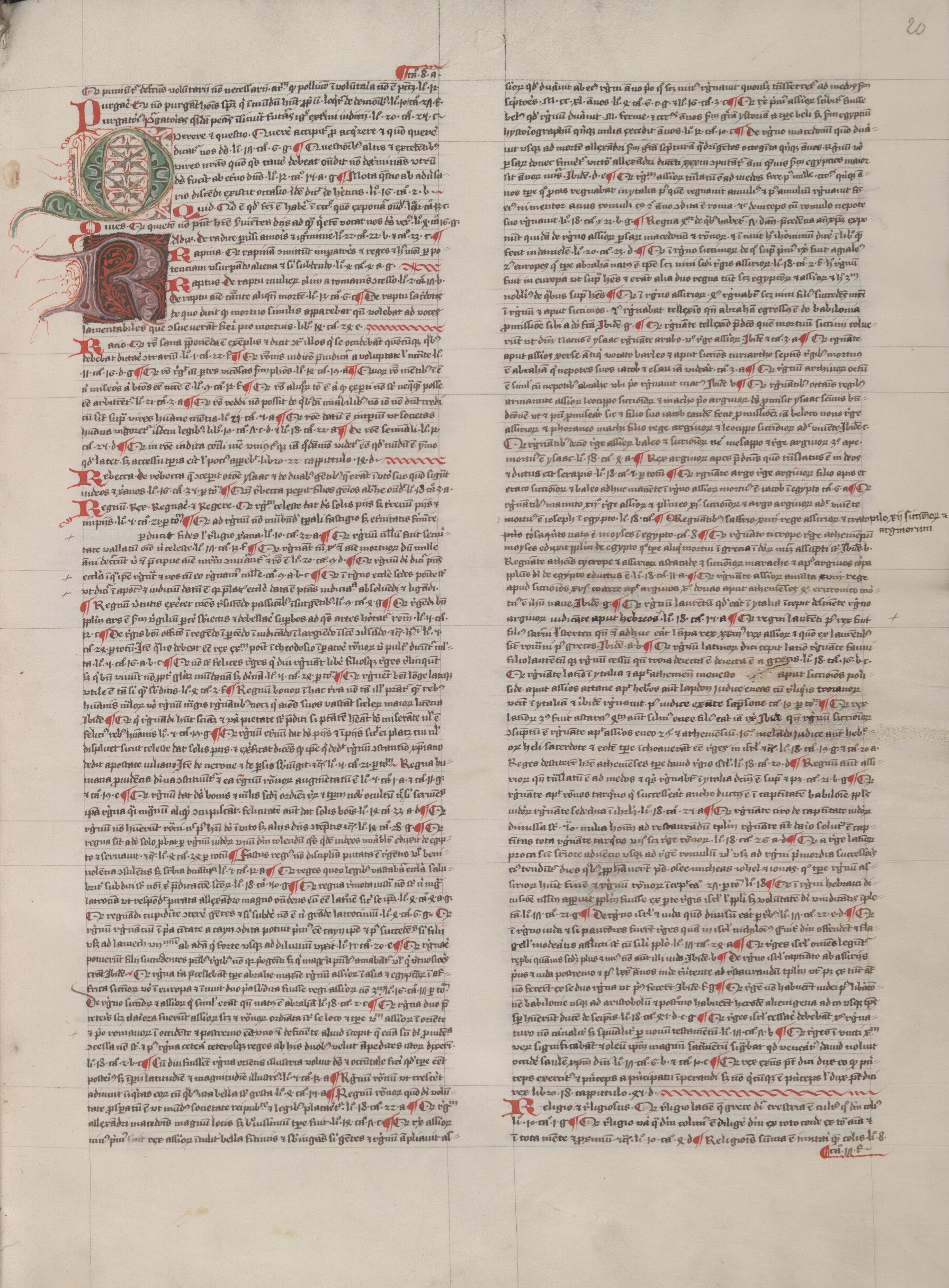
Excerpt from a copy of the manuscript "The City of God", made by Jacobus De Stephelt in 1472.

== Legacy ==
The 1913 Catholic Encyclopedia and 1911 Encyclopædia Britannica both describe The City of God as Augustine's single most important work, as well as the first example of a philosophy of history. Like the Confessions, it is popular among both theologians and the general public.

Pope John XXIII used Augustine's distinction between two cities as a summary of his assessment of the position of the Catholic Church in the late 1950s as he assumed papal office: on the one hand, "the grace of Christ" continues to bear fruit; on the other, many people are entirely concerned with securing earthly goods.

Augustine's concept of world history guided by Divine Providence in a universal war between God and the Devil forms part of the official doctrine of the Catholic Church, as stated in the Second Vatican Council's Pastoral Constitution Gaudium et spes:

"The Church ... holds that in her most benign Lord and Master can be found the key, the focal point and the goal of man, as well as of all human history ... all of human life, whether individual or collective, shows itself to be a dramatic struggle between good and evil, between light and darkness ... The Lord is the goal of human history the focal point of the longings of history and of civilization, the center of the human race, the joy of every heart and the answer to all its yearnings."

== English translations ==
- The City of God. Translation by William Babcock, notes by Boniface Ramsey. Hyde Park, NY: New City Press, 2012.
- The City of God against the Pagans. Translation by R. W. Dyson. New York: Cambridge University Press, 1998. ISBN 0-521-46475-7
- The City of God. Translation by Henry Bettenson. Harmondsworth, England: Penguin Books, 1972.
- The City of God: Volumes XVI–XVIII Translation by Eva Matthews Sanford with William M. Green. Loeb Classical Library 415, 1965.
- City of God. Translation by William M. Green. Cambridge University Press, 1963
- The City of God. Translation by Gerald G. Walsh, S. J., et al. Introduction by Étienne Gilson. New York: Doubleday, Image Books, 1958.
- The City of God. Translation by Marcus Dods. Introduction by Thomas Merton. New York: The Modern Library, a division of Random House, Inc., 1950. First published: 1871.
- The City of God. Translation by John Healey. Introduction by Ernest Barker. New York: E. P. Dutton & Co., 1945.
- Of the Citie of God. Translation by John Healey. Notes by Juan Luis Vives. London: George Eld, 1610.
