= John Healy =

John or Jack Healy may refer to:

== Sports ==
- John Healy (cricketer) (1851–1916), Australian cricketer
- Egyptian Healy (John J. Healy, 1866–1899), American baseball player
- John Healy (hurler), Irish hurler

== Others ==
- John Healy (entrepreneur) (1840–1908), American businessman
- John Healy (bishop) (1841–1918), Irish Catholic cleric
- John Edward Healy (1872–1934), Irish journalist
- John Healy (Australian politician) (1894–1970)
- Jack Healy (died 1972), American actor
- John Farmer Healy (1900–1973), Jamaican-born Catholic bishop
- John F. Healy (c.1924–2012), British scholar, classicist and writer
- Jack H. Healy (1929–2012), American geophysicist
- John Healy (Irish journalist) (1930–1991), Irish journalist
- John Healy (Irish politician) (died 1995), Irish politician
- John Healy (author) (born 1943), British chess player and writer
- John P. Healy (born c. 1967), United States Air Force officer

== See also ==
- John Healey (disambiguation)
- Jackie Healy-Rae (1931–2014), Irish politician
- Jack Healey (born 1938), human rights activist
