= John P. Healey =

American aerospace engineer

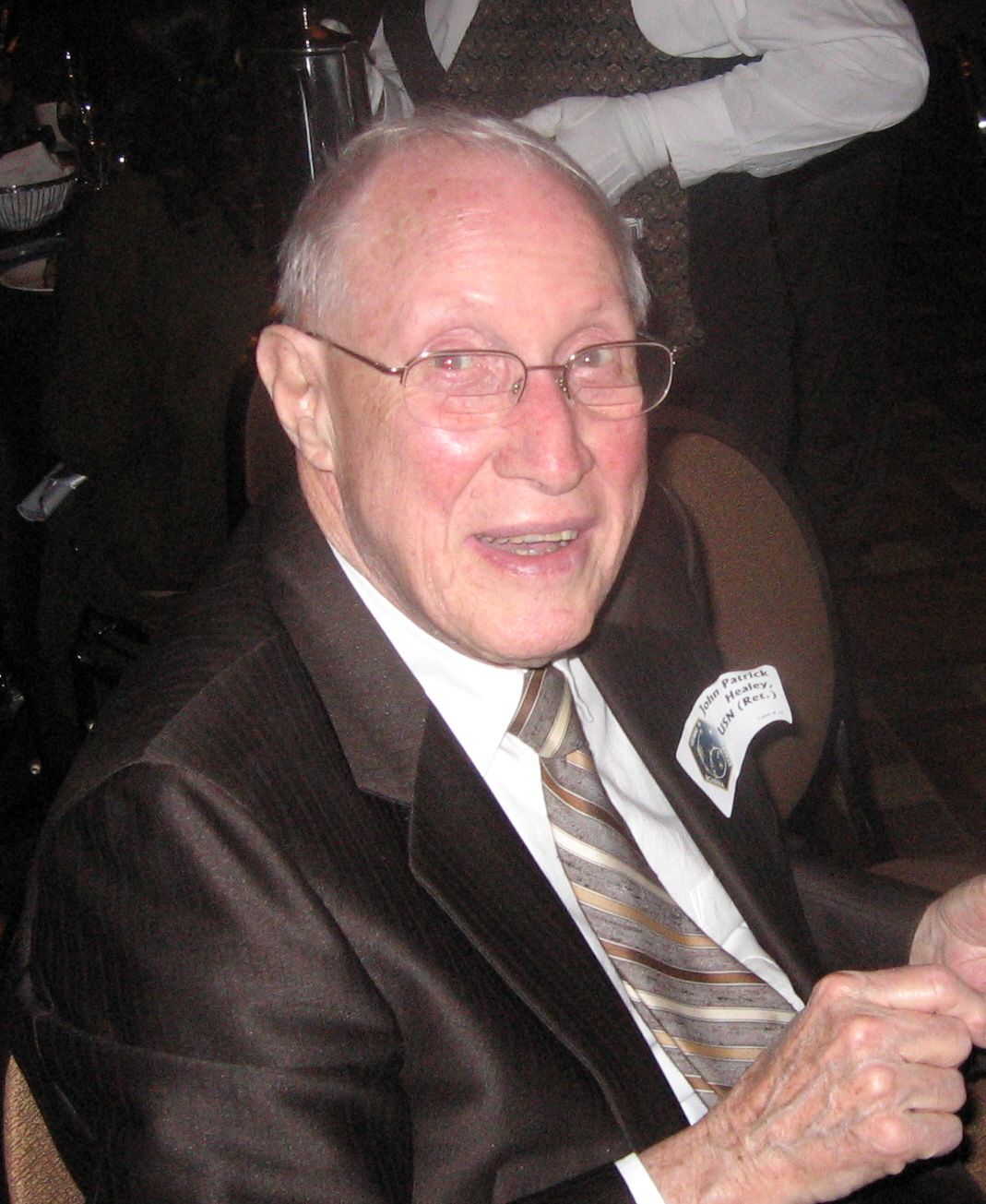
- Healey in 2009
- Born: March 7, 1922; Baltimore, Maryland, U.S.
- Died: March 15, 2019 (aged 97); Littleton, Colorado, U.S.
- Occupation: Aerospace Executive Manager

John P. Healey (March 7, 1922 – March 15, 2019) was an American aerospace executive manager. He was best known for his role in the redesign and manufacture of the command modules for the Apollo program after the catastrophic launch pad fire that took the lives of Command Pilot Virgil I. "Gus" Grissom, Senior Pilot Ed White and Pilot Roger B. Chaffee on January 27, 1967 (Apollo 1). He died in March 2019 at the age of 97.

== Early life and education ==
Healey grew up on Normal Avenue in Baltimore, Maryland, the son of Irish immigrants. His father was a stone cutter and his mother worked as a maid. As a boy, he attended St. Paul's elementary school where he played baseball while working for the local grocer after school. He attended Baltimore City College and played soccer in the state tournament against Annapolis.

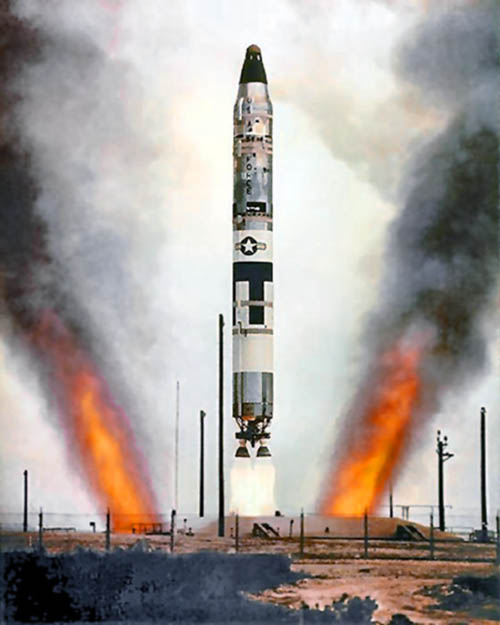
Titan II missile launch

== From aircraft to missiles ==
After serving in the Navy during World War II, Healey went to work for the Glenn L. Martin Company in Baltimore, Maryland. From his start as an aircraft quality inspector to his role leading manufacturing and quality control for the Titan missile program, he gained a reputation for being tough but fair, and for his ability to motivate the organization to get the job done right.

The lifting power and reliability of Titan missiles led to its selection and use in the NASA Gemini program of crewed space capsules in the mid-1960s. Twelve Titan IIs were used to launch two U.S. uncrewed Gemini test launches and ten two-seat crewed capsules. All of the launches were successes.

== Apollo program ==
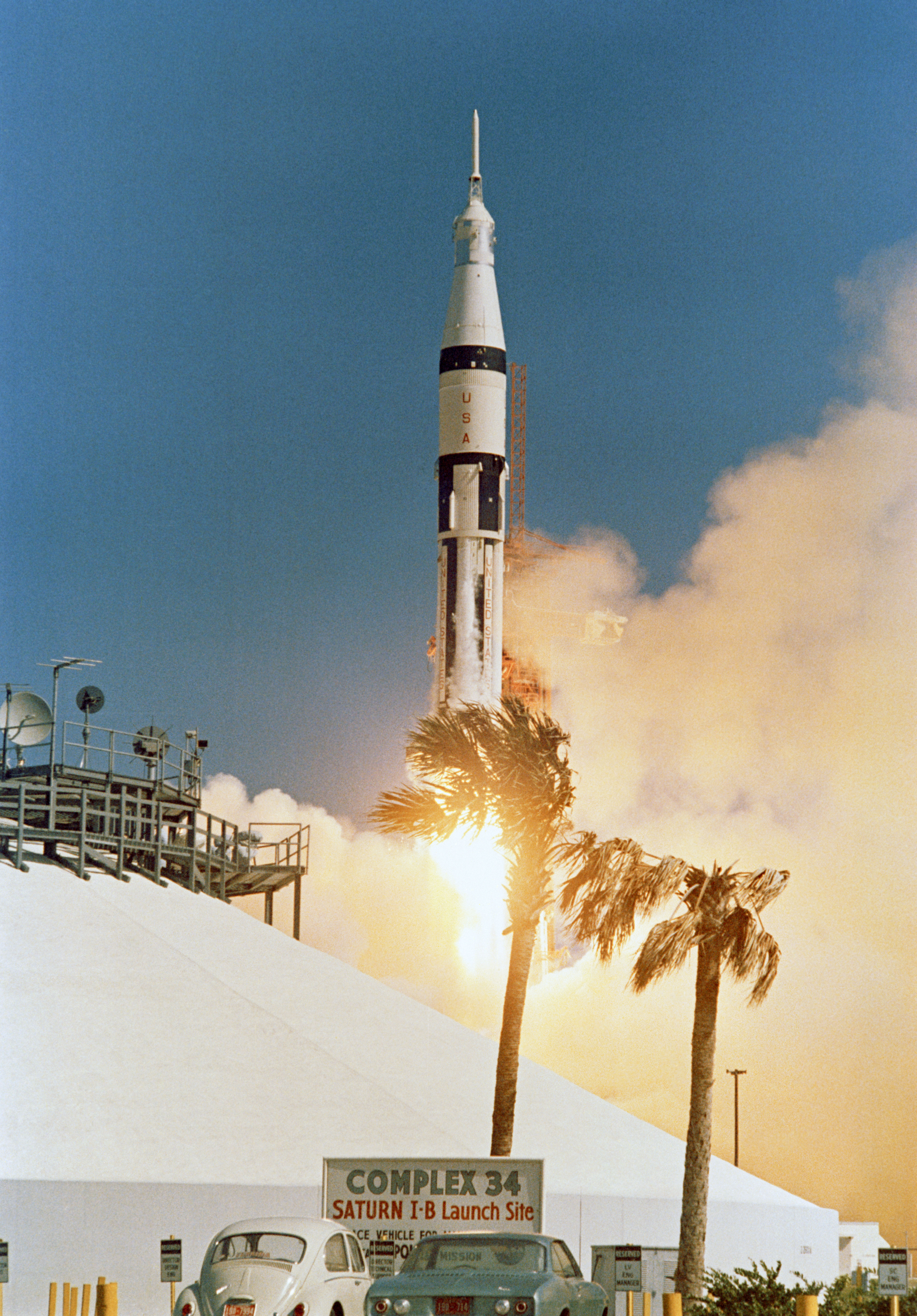
Apollo 7 launch

After the catastrophic launch pad fire that took the lives of Command Pilot Virgil I. "Gus" Grissom, Senior Pilot Ed White and Pilot Roger B. Chaffee in January 1967, Healey was recruited by Bill Bergen, President of North American Aviation Space Division, as the spacecraft manager for the redesign of the Apollo Command Module (November 1967).

Healey was expected to set precedents in guiding a nearly perfect spacecraft through the factory. Many doubted, Bergen later said, that the recovery could be made in a reasonable time because "everything had come to a screeching halt." Bergen credited the assignment of Borman and his group, and Healey's performance as manager of spacecraft as the keys to getting command module production back into line. When the command module (Block II Apollo CSM-101) arrived at the Cape in May 1968, the receiving inspectors found fewer discrepancies than on any spacecraft previously delivered to Kennedy Space Center. By the end of the program, Healey was Rockwell's VP for Apollo and Stage II of the Saturn V rocket.

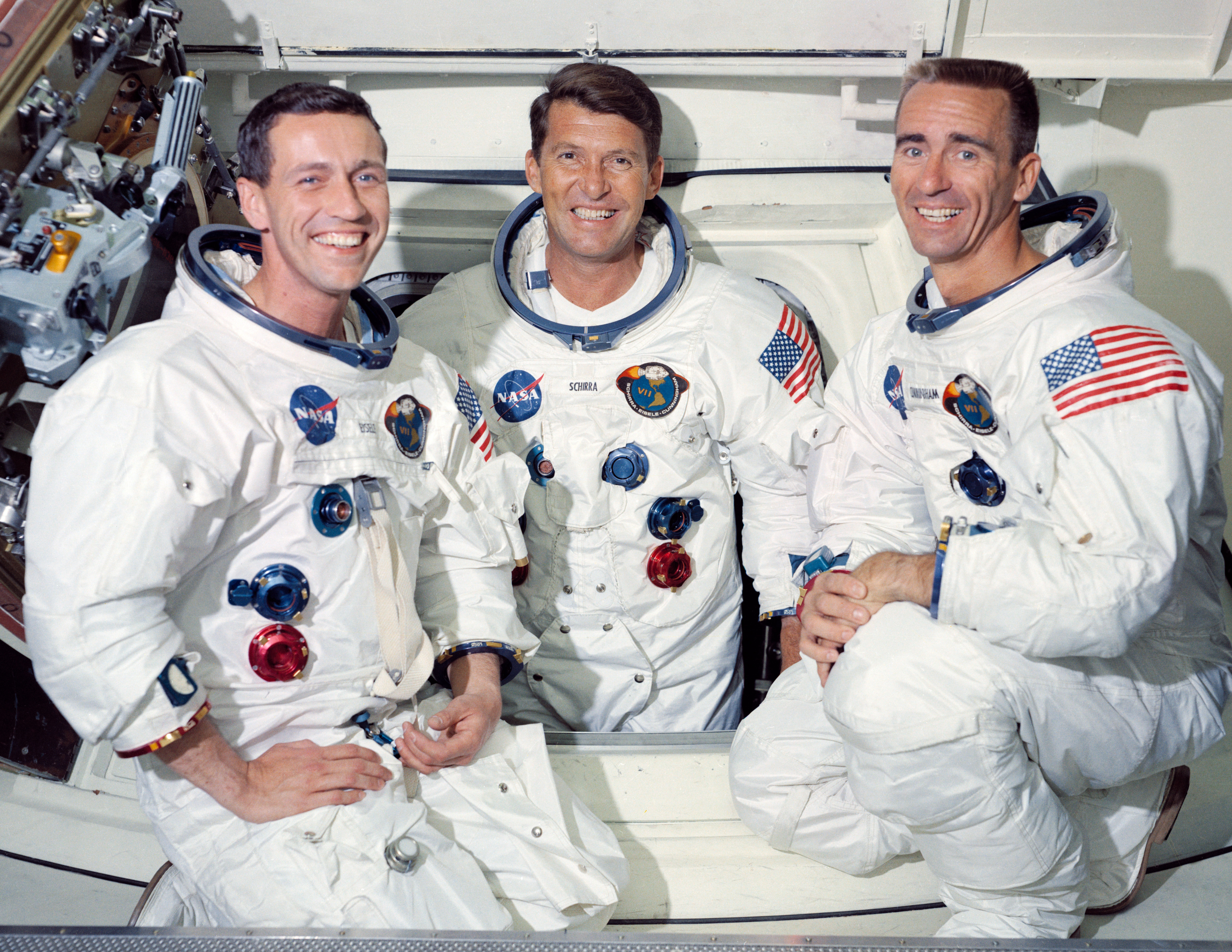
Eisele, Schirra, Cunningham

Apollo 7 (October 1968), the first crewed Apollo mission, was a test flight and confidence-builder with the extensively redesigned command module. Schirra, who would be the only astronaut to fly Mercury, Gemini and Apollo missions, commanded this Earth-orbital shakedown of the command and service modules (with Donn Eisele and Walt Cunningham). The Apollo hardware and all mission operations worked without any significant problems and Schirra and Healey remained lifelong friends.

Apollo 8 (December 1968), was the first crewed spacecraft to orbit another celestial body.

Apollo 11 (July 1969), was the first landing of a man on the surface of the Moon.

Apollo 17 (December 1972), was the last of the Apollo missions. It marks the last moonwalk and also the last crewed mission beyond low Earth orbit.

== Lancer to system development ==
After Apollo, Healey was assigned to the Rockwell B-1 Lancer program; a supersonic strategic bomber designed to replace the aging B-52.

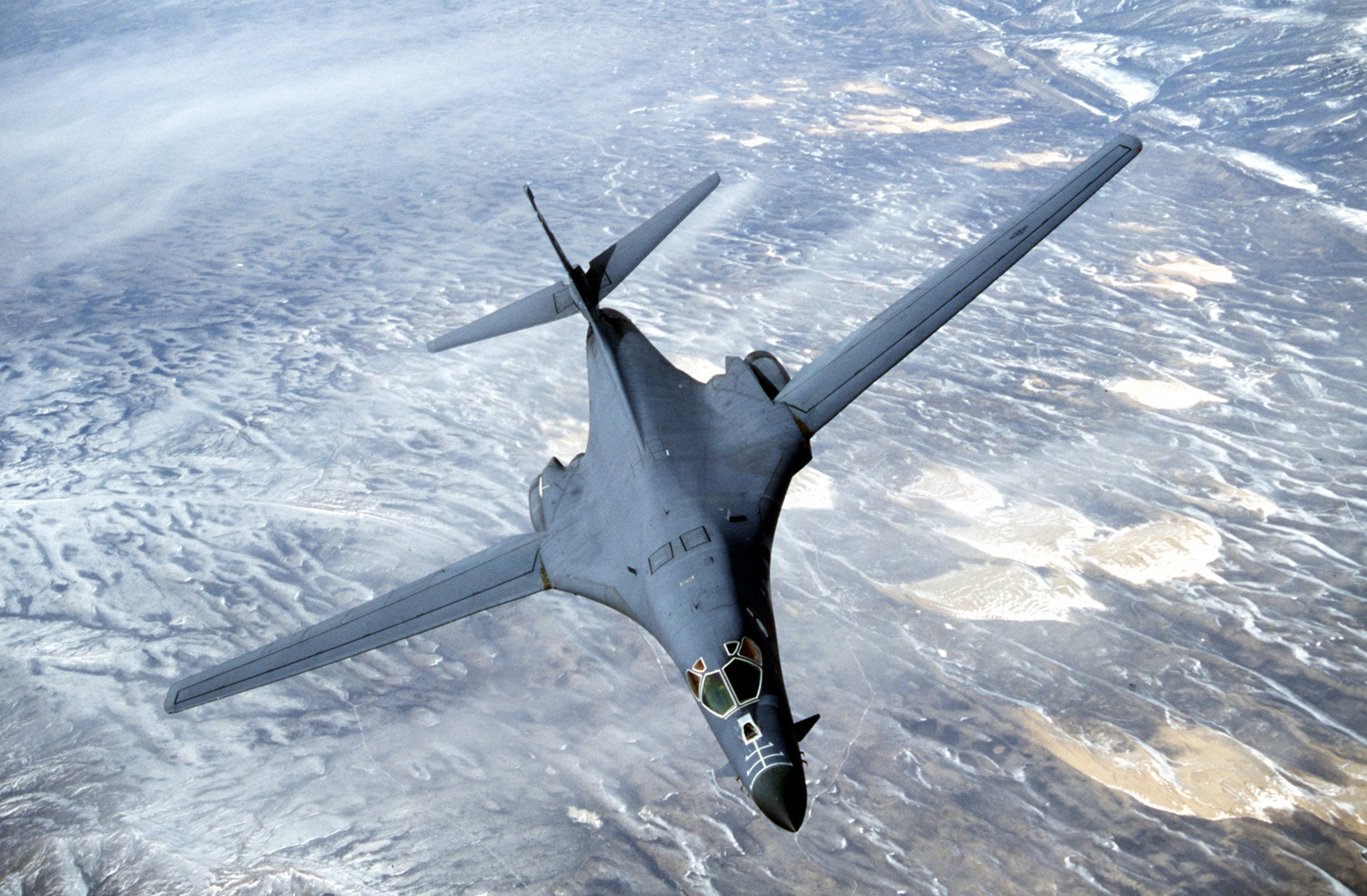
B-1 Lancer "Bone"

The B-1A mockup review had occurred in late October 1971 and there had been 297 requests for alterations. Under Healey's management, the first of four prototype B-1A models (s/n 74-0158) flew on December 23, 1974. Due to the politics of the era and programs competing for funding, it would be more than a decade before the first production B-1B aircraft would fly.

During this period Healey was responsible for upgrading Rockwell's civilian aircraft, the Commander 112/114, and bringing them to an efficient production level. Engines were replaced with more powerful versions, the wing was redesigned internally to increase fuel capacity, and a turbo-charged model was introduced. As the market potential for this class of civilian aircraft later declined, Rockwell sold this line to Gulfstream American who discontinued production.

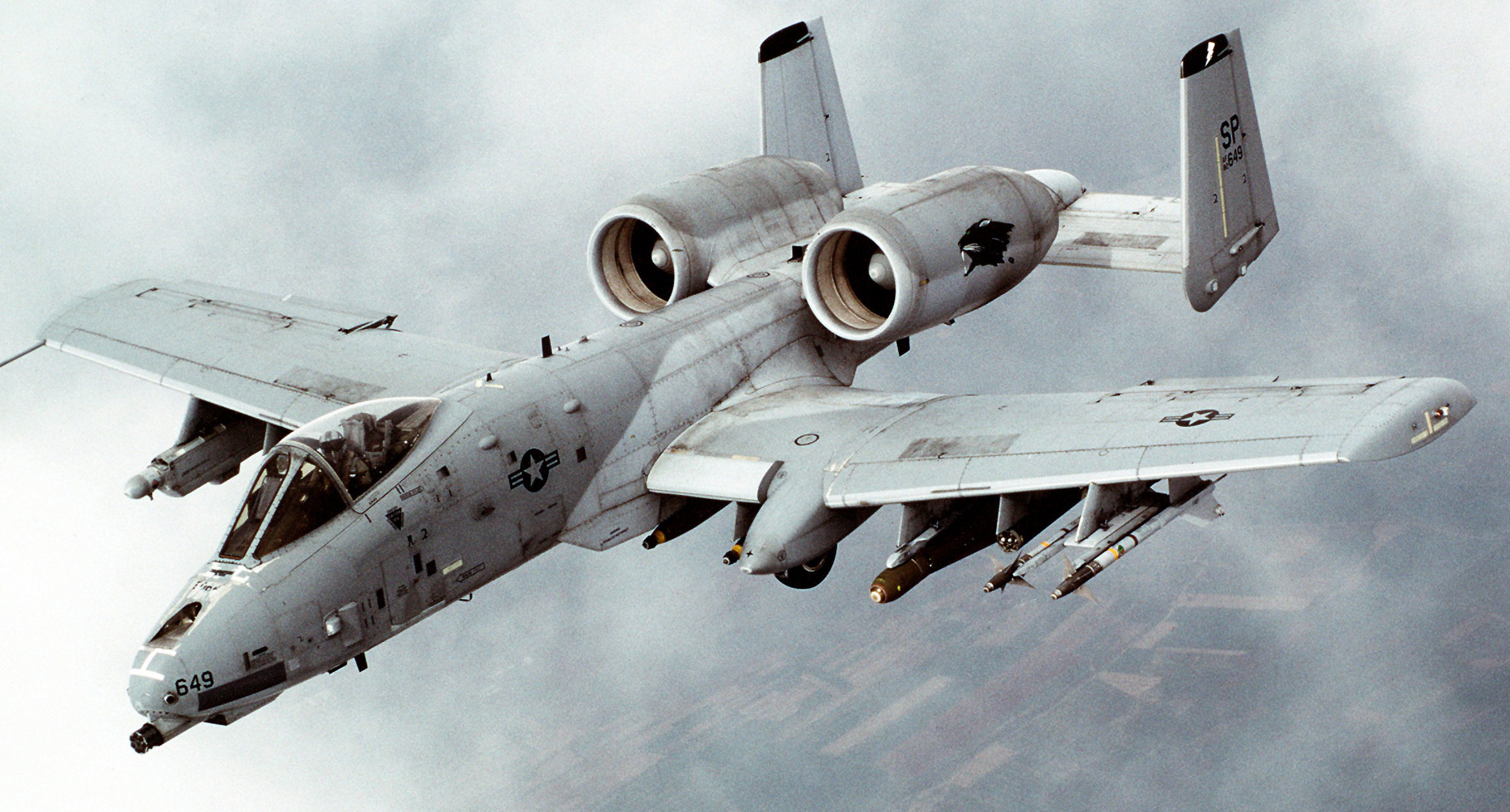
A-10 Thunderbolt II "Warthog"

Healey left Rockwell to manage a military aircraft program taking the Fairchild-Republic A-10 Thunderbolt II, a close air support (CAS) aircraft, from prototype to production. Selected by the Air Force over its rival from Northrop, the YA-9, in January 1973, the first production A-10 flew in October 1975 and deliveries to operational units commenced within 6 months.

Healey then joined System Development Corporation (SDC) as an executive manager for ongoing government contracts with the Department of Defense (DoD), National Aeronautics and Space Administration (NASA), Department of Energy (DoE), and other government agencies. In 1980, SDC was acquired by the Burroughs Corporation and later merged with the Sperry Corporation to form Unisys. Healey promoted the development of program control systems and the automation of project management throughout his career and was retired from Unisys.

== Constellation program ==
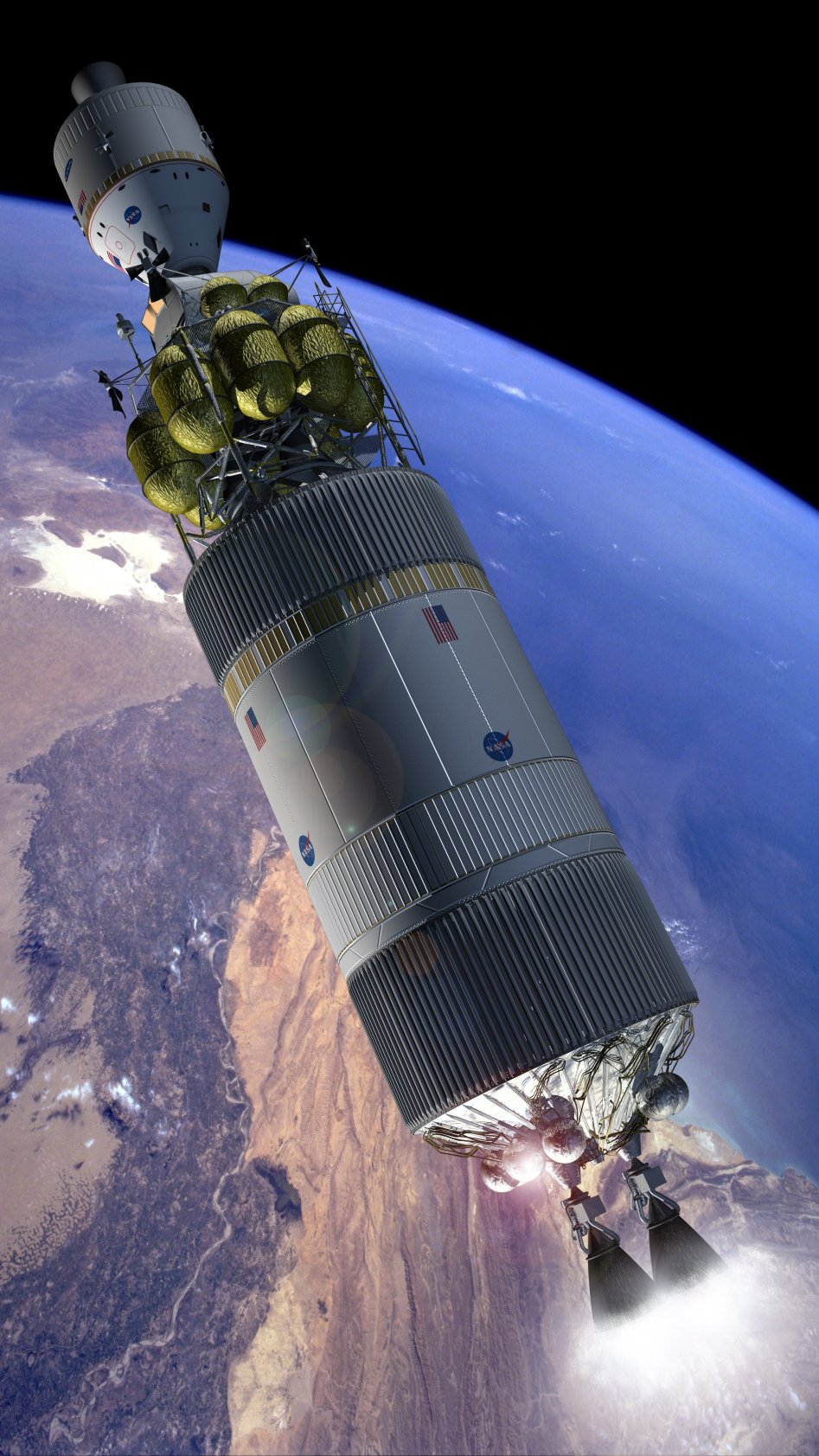
Orion CM docked with LSAM in orbit

Healey, coming out of retirement, joined the Lockheed Martin Orion team in 2008. The Orion spacecraft designs are based substantially on the Apollo command and service module (Apollo CSM) flown between 1967 and 1975, but include advances derived from other technology programs, including; control systems from the Boeing 787, "autodock" features from Russian/European spacecraft, waste-management systems based on Skylab, the Space Shuttle, and the International Space Station, and the most advanced computers ever put into a spacecraft. "Going with known technology and known solutions lowers the risk," according to Neil Woodward, director of the integration office in the Exploration Systems Mission Directorate.

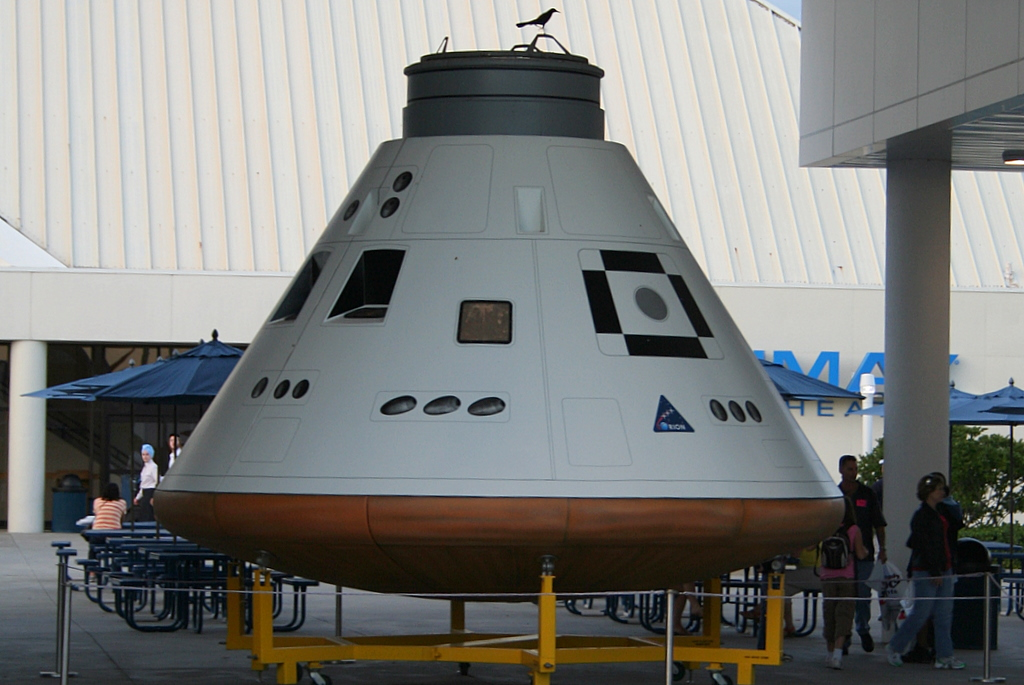
Orion CM

The goals of Orion include:

... to bring to bear the nation's premier human space flight and exploration expertise in the development of NASA's next generation crew transportation system

... to span five decades in large-scale systems integration, planetary exploration, human space flight systems and operations, launch vehicles, military aircraft, and autonomous flight systems

... to provide a critical foundation for NASA's vision for space exploration to design, develop and successfully return the only deep space capsule missions since the Apollo era

It was an element of NASA's Project Constellation, which was planned to send human explorers back to the Moon by 2020, and then onward to Mars and other destinations in the Solar System.

== In popular culture ==
In the 1998 HBO miniseries From the Earth to the Moon, episode entitled "We Have Cleared the Tower", the role of John Healey was played by Brandon Smith.
