= John Healey (translator) =

English translator

John Healey (died 1610) was an English translator. Among scanty biographical facts, according to a statement by his friend the printer Thomas Thorpe, Healey was ill in 1609 and was dead in the following year.

== Works ==
To three of his translations, Thomas Thorpe, the printer of Shakespeare's sonnets, prefixed dedications. His works are:

- ‘Philip Mornay, Lord of Plessis, his Teares. For the death of his Sonne. Unto his Wife, Charlotte Baliste. Englished by John Healey. London (G. Eld),’ 1609. Healey dedicates this tract to ‘my most honoured and constant friend, Maister John Coventry,’ with whom he has ‘thus long sayled in a deepe darke sea of misfortune.’
- ‘The Discovery of a Newe World, or a Descripcon of the South Indyes hitherto unknowne. By an English Mercury. London, for Ed. Blount and W. Barrett,’ n.d. This was entered to Thomas Thorpe in the ‘Stationers' Register’ on 18 January 1609. It is a humorous version in English of Joseph Hall's satire Mundus Alter et Idem.
- ‘Epictetus his Manuall And Cebes his Table. Out of the Greeke Originall by Jo. Healey. Printed for Th. Thorpe,’ 1610, 24mo. This contains a dedication by ‘Th. Th.’ (Thomas Thorpe) to John Florio, who is said to have ‘procured an impregnable protection’ for Healey's ‘apprentises essay.’ A second edition appeared in 1616 (printed by George Purslowe for Edward Blount), to which a version of Theophrastus's ‘Characters,’ separately paged, was added. A dedication by Thorpe to the Earl of Pembroke takes the place of the dedication to Florio.
- ‘St. Augustine of the Citie of God: with the learned Commentarie of Jo. Lod. Vives. Englished by J. H.,’ London (George Eld), 1610, folio. The dedication by Thorpe to William, earl of Pembroke, speaks of Healey as dead, and apologises for consequent imperfections in the translation. A second edition, revised, was issued in 1620, with a new dedication by William Crashaw (the father of the poet) to Pembroke and his brother Philip. Healey followed the elaborate edition of Juan Luis Vives, translating his commentary, and turning into English verse the numerous quotations by St. Augustine and by Vives from Greek and Latin poets. It was the only English translation of The City of God until the appearance in 1871 and following years of a translation of all Augustine's works under the editorship of Dr. Marcus Dods. Dods, in his preface to the ‘De Civitate Dei,’ speaks of Healey's translation as ‘exceptionally bad.’ The ‘Epictetus’ is terse and clear, and the cumbrous periods of the ‘City of God’ are typical Elizabethan prose. A reprint of the 1610 edition of the ‘City of God,’ without the commentary of Vives, was published in the ‘Ancient and Modern Library of Theological Literature’ (2 vols. 1890).
