= John F. Healy =

English classicist (1926–2012)

John F. Healy (27 August 1926 – 25 April 2012) was a senior scholar and graduate of Trinity College, Cambridge. He served in the Army (Intelligence Corps) then entered an academic career in Classics and Classical Archaeology at Manchester and London Universities. He was the sometime curator of Greek coins at Manchester Museum and President of the Windsor Art Society. He was Dean of the Faculties of Arts and Music and Chairman of the combined Classics Departments of Royal Holloway, University of London and Bedford College, London. He was Emeritus Professor of Classics, University of London and the author of numerous books and articles.

== Biography ==
Healy was born in England. He attended Battersea Grammar School. At the outbreak of World War II, his family were evacuated to Worthing, and then to Hertford. When his father (who worked for the Admiralty) was transferred from London to Bath, the family joined him there, and Healy's education continued at the City of Bath Boys School. He gained an entrance to Cambridge University, but after one year he was called into the military. As a captain in the Army Intelligence Corps (beginning 1943) he was stationed in India, then in Singapore. He was an interpreter in the Japanese War Crimes Trial.

In 1949 Healy left military service, returning to his studies. He was a senior scholar and graduate of Trinity College, Cambridge. In 1954 he earned a Ph.D. in Classics and Archaeology at Manchester University. He remained there as a literature lecturer, then moved to Bedford College, London, in 1961, as Reader in Greek.

In 1966 Healy began working at Royal Holloway College at the University of London, as Professor of Classics. He was Head of the Department of Classics, then Dean of the Faculty of Arts (1978–1981), then Chairman of the Department of Classics (1985–1989). He retired from Holloway in 1990.

In 1957 Healy married Carol Ann McEvoy (whose father had founded Kellogg Co. of Great Britain). Their son John Matthew Healy was born in October 1964.

Healy was the unofficial curator of Greek coins at Manchester Museum, and served as President of the Windsor Art Society. He also lectured occasionally on Swans Hellenic and Royal Viking Line cruises.

In retirement Healy and his second wife Barbara Henshall, who he married in 1985, resided in Macclesfield, Cheshire. He continued lecturing throughout Europe, the USA and the Far East.

== Published works ==
=== Books ===
- Healy, John F. (1978). Mining and Metallurgy in the Greek and Roman World. Thames and Hudson. ISBN 978-0-500-40035-7.
- Pliny the Elder (1991). Natural History. Penguin Books Limited. ISBN 978-0-14-044413-1.
- Healy, John F. (1999). Pliny the Elder on Science and Technology. Oxford University Press. ISBN 978-0-19-814687-2.

=== Articles ===
- The Art of Persuasion in Greece (with G. Kennedy), Journal of Hellenistic Studies 86:189 (1966)
