= Healy (surname) =

The English-language surname Healy is in use by two separate ancestral lines of people from Ireland.

When Irish people began to anglicise their names, two separate clans adopted the English-language surname of "Healy". There was the Ó hÉilidhe clan from Connaught and the Ó hÉalaighthe clan from Munster.

Many different spellings of the surname exist including Haly, Haley, Haily, Healey, Hely, O'Healy and O'Haly.

== Notable people with the surname Healy ==
- A. J. Healy (Alan James Healy; born 1969), Irish children's writer
- Aidan Healy, Irish hurler who played for Kerry and Abbeydorney
- Albert Frederick Healy (1873–1942), Canadian lawyer and politician, member of the House of Commons of Canada for Essex North (1923–1925)
- Alex Healy (racing driver) (born 1989), Canadian Touring Car racing driver
- Alice F. Healy (born 1946), American psychologist
- Alyssa Healy (born 1990), Australian women's cricketer
- Anna Healy, Baroness Healy of Primrose Hill (born 1955), British Labour politician, member of the House of Lords
- Anne Healy (born 1939), American artist, founding member of A.I.R. Gallery
- Ben Healy (disambiguation), multiple people
- Bernadine Healy (1944–2011), American physician
- Bernard Healy, member of the Los Angeles City Council (1904–1909)
- Bill Healy (William Raymond Healy; 1924–2010), American college football player
- Brendan Healy (born 1983), American lacrosse player
- Brendan Healy (comedian) (1956–2016), British entertainer
- Brian Healy (disambiguation), multiple people
- Cahir Healy (1877–1970), Irish politician
- Cahir Healy (dual player) (born 1986), Irish Gaelic footballer and hurler
- Catherine Healy (disambiguation), multiple people
- Cecil Healy (1881–1918), Australian swimmer
- Charles Healy (1883–?, date of death unknown), American water polo player
- Charlie Healy (disambiguation), multiple people
- Charles Healy (1903–1970), Canadian Politician, conservationist
- Chip Healy (1947–2019), American football player
- Christine Healy (born 1950), American actress
- Cian Healy (born 1987), Irish rugby player
- Clare Healy, New Zealand general practitioner
- Colin Healy (born 1980), Irish footballer
- Craig Healy (born 1957), American Olympic sailor
- Damien Healy, Irish Gaelic footballer
- Dan Healy (disambiguation), multiple people
- Daniel Healy (born 1974), Australian rules footballer
- Danny Healy-Rae (born 1954), Irish Independent politician, Teachta Dála for the Kerry constituency (from 2016)
- David Healy (disambiguation), multiple people
- Denis Healy (Irish politician), Fianna Fáil member of the Seanad Éireann (1934–1936, 1938–1948)
- Dermot Healy (1947–2014), Irish novelist and playwright
- Dermot Healy (hurling manager) (born 1948), Irish hurling manager
- Dick Healy (1921–2013), Australian rugby league footballer
- Don Healy (1936–2020), American footballer
- Dorian Healy (born 1962), British actor
- Dorothy Healy (disambiguation), multiple people
- Dorothy M. Healy (1914–1990), American educator, historian, and curator
- Eamonn Healy (born 1958), American chemistry professor
- Ed Healy (born 1973), American role-playing game designer
- Edward Healy (1869–1954), Member of Parliament in New Zealand (1928–1935)
- Edwin Healy (1909–1995), Australian cricketer
- Egyptian Healy (1866–1899), pitcher in Major League Baseball
- Eliza Healy (1846–1919), American educator
- Eloise Klein Healy (born 1943), American poet
- Eric Healy (1888–1954), Australian cricketer
- Erin Healy, American politician
- Felix Healy (born 1955), Northern Irish footballer
- Fergal Healy (born 1977), Irish hurler who played for Craughwell and Galway
- Frances Healy (born 1970), Irish actress, comedian, radio personality, and TV presenter
- Francis Healy (disambiguation), multiple people
- Frank Healy (born 1962), British guitarist
- Gene Healy (born 1970), American political pundit, journalist and editor
- George Peter Alexander Healy (1813–1894), American painter
- Gerald Healy (1885–1946), Australian cricketer
- Gerard Healy (born 1961), Australian rules footballer
- Gerry Healy (1913–1989), Irish Trotskyist activist
- Gertrude Healy (1894–1984), Australian violinist, conductor, music educator
- Glenn Healy (born 1962), Canadian ice hockey player
- Graham Healy (born 1956), Australian politician, member of the Legislative Assembly of Queensland (1992–2001)
- Greg Healy (born 1965), Australian rules footballer who played for Melbourne in the VFL/AFL
- Gus Healy (Augustine A. Healy; 1904–1987), Irish Fianna Fáil politician, Lord Mayor of Cork (1964–1965, 1975–1976)
- Harold H. Healy Jr. (1921–2007), American lawyer, President of the Union Internationale des Avocats (1979–1981)
- Howard R. Healy (1899–1942), US Navy officer
- Ian Healy (born 1964), Australian cricketer
- Jack Healy (died 1972), American actor and the manager of boxer Rocky Graziano
- Jack H. Healy (1929–2012), American geophysicist
- Jackie Healy-Rae (1931–2014), Irish politician
- Jaime Aleman Healy (born 1953), Panamanian lawyer, businessman and diplomat, Ambassador of Panama to the United States (2009–2011)
- James Andrew Healy (1895–1983), American World War I flying ace
- James Augustine Healy (1830–1900), American Roman Catholic priest and the second bishop of Portland, Maine
- James Healy (disambiguation), multiple people
- Jane Healy (journalist) (1949–2026), American journalist
- Janet Healy, American film producer
- Jeremiah Healy (1948–2014), American crime novelist
- Jeremy Healy (born 1962), British DJ
- Jerramiah Healy (born 1950), Mayor of Jersey City
- Joe Healy (born 1986), English football midfielder
- John Healy (disambiguation), multiple people
- Jonathan Healy (politician) (born 1945), American politician, member of the Massachusetts House of Representatives (1971–1993)
- Joseph D. Healy (1912–1971), American explorer
- Joseph Healy (1776–1861), American politician
- Juan Ruiz Healy, Mexican-American journalist
- Julie Healy, Australian model
- Katie Healy (born 1998), English professional boxer
- Katherine Healy (born 1969), American principal ballerina
- Kevin Healy (1909–2001), Australian communist activist and trade unionist
- Kevin Healy (footballer) (born 1937), Australian footballer
- Kieran Healy, Irish sociologist
- Leo H. Healy (1894–1962), American lawyer
- Leo Healy (footballer) (1890–1939), Australian footballer
- Marcia Healy (1904–1972), American film actress
- Margaret Healy, Irish singer/songwriter
- Mark Healy (Gaelic footballer) (born 1960), Irish Gaelic footballer
- Martin J. Healy (1883–1942), American politician
- Mary Healy (disambiguation), multiple people
- Matt Healy (disambiguation), multiple people
- Matty Healy (born 1989), English musician
- Maurice Healy (politician) (1859–1923), Irish nationalist politician
- Maurice Healy (campaigner) (1933–2020), British consumer campaigner
- Maurice Healy (writer) (1887–1943), Irish lawyer and author
- Michael Healy (disambiguation), multiple people
- Nathan Healy (basketball) (born 1990), American basketball player
- Ned R. Healy (1905–1977), American politician, member of the U.S. House of Representatives (1945–1947)
- Niall Healy (born 1985), Irish hurler
- Noëlle Healy (born 1991), Irish Gaelic footballer
- Paddy Healy (1922–1983), Irish hurler and Gaelic footballer
- Paddy Healy (St Mary's hurler), Irish hurler
- Pamela Healy (born 1963), American sailor
- Patricia Healy (born 1959), American actress
- Patrick Healy (disambiguation), multiple people
- Paul M. Healy, American Professor of Business Administration at Harvard Business School (since 1998)
- Peadar Healy (born 1963), Irish Gaelic football player and manager
- Phil Healy (born 1994), Irish sprinter
- Randolph Healy (born 1956), Irish poet and publisher
- Raymond J. Healy (1907–1997), American science fiction anthologist
- Robert Healy (disambiguation), multiple people
- Roy Healy (1915–1968), American rocket scientist
- Ryan Healy (born 1983), American mixed martial artist
- Ryon Healy (born 1992), American baseball player
- Sam Healy (born 1976), Australian actress
- Sarah Healy (born 2001), Irish middle-distance runner
- Scott Healy, American musician
- Séamus Healy (born 1950), Irish politician
- Sean Healy, American artist
- Shane Healy (born 1968), Irish Olympic middle-distance runner
- Shay Healy (1942–2021), Irish songwriter, broadcaster and journalist
- Siobhan Healy (born 1976), Scottish artist
- Steve Healy, Australian sporting administrator and lawyer, President of Tennis Australia 2010–2017
- Susan D. Healy, New Zealand biology professor at St. Andrews University, specialist in bird and animal cognitive behaviour
- Ted Healy (1896–1937), American vaudeville performer
- Terry Healy (footballer) (1921–2009), Australian footballer
- Terry Healy (politician) (born 1981), Australian politician, member of the Western Australian Legislative Assembly from 2017
- Thomas Healy (disambiguation), multiple people
- Timothy Healy (disambiguation), multiple people
- Tom Healy (disambiguation), multiple people
- Tucka Healy, American soccer player and Google employee
- Una Healy (born 1981), Irish singer with The Saturdays
- William Healy (disambiguation), multiple people
- Yvonne Healy, Irish storyteller

== Fictional characters ==
- Alex Healy, in the BBC soap opera Eastenders
- Benjamin Healy, in the film Problem Child, Junior's dad
- Mike Healy, in the TV series Oz
- Sam Healy, in the Netflix series Orange Is the New Black
- Wendy Healy, in the novel and TV series Lipstick Jungle

== See also ==
- Healey (surname)
- Heal (surname)
- Earl of Donoughmore, a title in the Peerage of Ireland
- Healy Baumgardner (born 1979), American political advisor
- Healy family
