= Andrea Marcolongo =

Italian essayist and writer (born 1987)

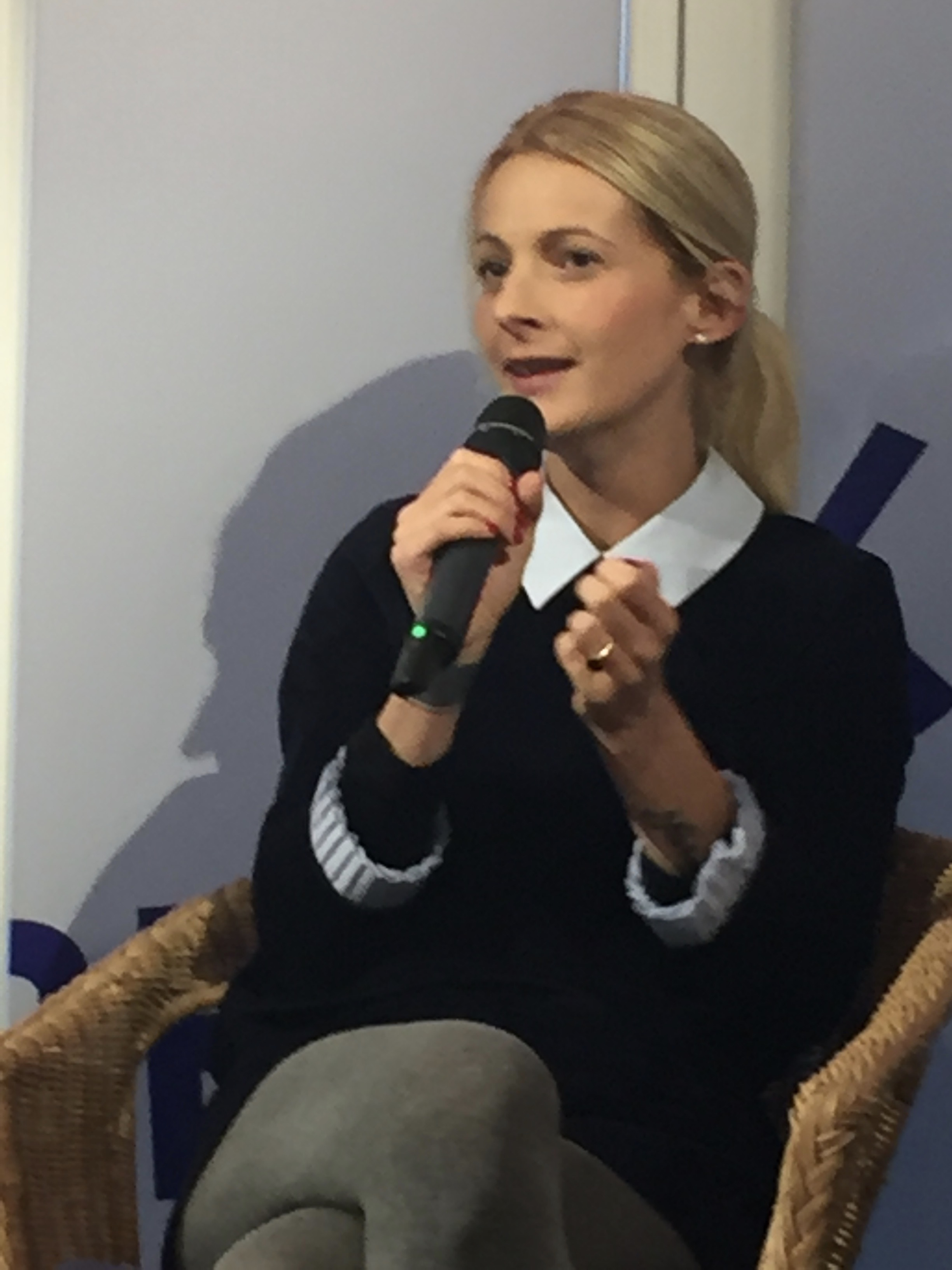
- in 2018
- Born: 1987 (age 38–39); Crema
- Education: University of Milan
- Occupation: Writer

Andrea Marcolongo (born in Crema, Lombardy on 17 January 1987) is an Italian writer.

== Life ==
Marcolongo studied Classical Literature at Università degli Studi di Milano. She then specialized in storytelling in Turin at Scuola Holden. She worked as a ghostwriter for Matteo Renzi and the Democratic Party between December 2013 and May 2014.

In September 2016 Andrea Marcolongo published her first book, La lingua geniale. 9 ragioni per amare il greco which reached the first place in the Italian and French sales ranking. The book sold 150.000 copies in Italy, reaching the first position in non-fiction ranking and the seventh in the Italian general top ten in January 2017. In December 2016 La lingua geniale. 9 ragioni per amare il greco won the Lions Club Youth Award at the Cesare Angelini award of University of Pavia.

La lingua geniale. 9 ragioni per amare il greco has been translated in France and in Belgium for the publishing house Les Belles Lettres, in Spain, Chile, Argentina, Colombia, Mexico and Peru for Penguin Random House with the title La lengua de los dioses, in Germany for Piper, in Netherlands and Belgium for Wereldbibliotheek, in Greece for Patakis, in Croatia for Sandorf, in Great Britain and in the United States for Europa Editions The book obtained positive reviews from the French press, from Le Figaro to Le Monde who stated about Marcolongo as of "the new greek hero". The book got a great attention of the public and critics in the United States: published by Europa Editions already known for having published Elena Ferrante, with a translation by Will Schutt, The ingenious language got a very positive review from The New Yorker with an article by the editor Mary Norris who calls it an “instant classic”, while the writer André Aciman talks about Andrea Marcolongo as of the “new Montaigne”.

In 2018 Andrea Marcolongo published in Italy La Misura Eroica. Il mito degli Argonauti e il coraggio che spinge gli uomini ad amare for Mondadori: Enzo Bianchi wrote on La Stampa that "navigating through the pages of this book means entering, with measure and amiability, into a single reality, which can also be summarized in a noun and an adjective: the 'human adventure'", while La Repubblica talked about "a book that is both hyper-classic and ultra-contemporary in its vocation to combine great story, profound essay, personal introspection, motivational appeal ". La Misura Eroica. Il mito degli Argonauti e il coraggio che spinge gli uomini ad amare is translated in 17 countries, including France with the title La part du héros, Belgium, Spain, Chile, Argentina, Colombia, Mexico, Peru, Germany, Netherlands and Greece. A chapter of the book has been translated by the American literary review Liberties.

In 2019 Marcolongo published for Mondadori the compendium of etymologies Alla fonte delle parole, translated in France with the title Étymologies pour survivre au chaos (Les Belles Lettres) and in Spain with the title Etimologías para sobrevivir al caos (Penguin Random House).

In 2020 Marcolongo published La lezione di Enea (Laterza), an intimate essay about the Aeneid by Virgil. The book is translated in France with the title L'art de résister. Comment « l'Éneide » nous apprend à traverser une crise, which marks the achievement of Marcolongo with the publishing house Gallimard, and is presented at the Philo Forum in Le Mans organized by the newspaper Le Monde. In 2022 the lecture Marcologno gave at Le Mans has been published in the book Être humain? directed by Jean Birnbaum and edited by Gallimard.

In spring 2021 Marcolongo edited for La Repubblica a series in four volumes dedicated to the ancient myth and a children's book about etymologies. She also published Il viaggio delle parole (Mondadori), illustrated by Andrea Ucini and translated in Spain with the title El viaje de las palabras. Marcolongo's latest book is De arte gymnastica. Da Maratona ad Atene con le ali ai piedi (Laterza 2022), "an autobiography of running", in which the author talks about her first marathon and the ancient conception of sport. In autumn 2022 Mondadori published Le rose a dicembre, where Marcolongo wrote a short story about Aristophanes.

In Spring 2022 Starting from the scratch. The life-changing lesson of Aeneas is published in the United States by Europa Editions with a translation by Will Schutt.

Andrea Marcolongo currently lives in Paris; she is the vice-president of the Writers of the French Navy, an association affiliated with the Ministry of Defense "committed to preserving the culture of the sea", for which she received the honorary rank of frigate captain. She regularly reviews books of foreign literature for the weekly insert Tuttolibri by La Stampa and she collaborates with various Italian and foreign newspapers. She is member or the jury of Prix du Livre d'Histoire des Outres-Mer and of Prix Le Grand Continent.
