= Heal (surname) =

Heal is a surname. Notable people with the surname include:

- Aaron Heal (born 1983), Australian cricketer
- Albert Victor Heal (1887–1975), architect and designer
- Ambrose Heal (1872–1959), English furniture designer and businessman
- Felicity Heal (born 1945), British historian and academic
- Graham Heal (1945–2018), Australian rules footballer
- Jack Heal (1919–1988), Australian rules footballer
- Jane Heal (born 1946), British philosopher
- Jim Heal, American football coach
- John Daniel Heal (1825–1908), alderman and mayor of Brisbane, Australia
- Marc Heal (born 1965), English musician
- Michael Heal (born 1948), English cricketer
- Rachel Heal (born 1973), English racing cyclist
- Shane Heal (born 1970), Australian basketball player
- Shyla Heal (born 2001), Australian basketball player
- Stan Heal (1920–2010), Australian rules footballer
- Sylvia Heal (born 1942), British Member of Parliament

== See also ==
- Healy (surname)
