= Leo Healy =

Leo Healy may refer to:

- Leo Healy (footballer), Australian rules footballer
- Leo H. Healy, American lawyer and judge
