= The Magdalene Sisters =

2002 British-Irish film by Peter Mullan

- Movie poster
- Directed by: Peter Mullan
- Written by: Peter Mullan
- Produced by: Frances Higson
- Starring: Geraldine McEwan; Anne-Marie Duff; Nora Jane Noone; Dorothy Duffy; Eileen Walsh
- Cinematography: Nigel Willoughby
- Music by: Craig Armstrong
- Production companies: Bord Scannán na hÉireann/the Irish Film Board; UK Film Council; Scottish Screen; Momentum Pictures; Temple Films; PFP Films
- Distributed by: Momentum Pictures
- Release dates: 30 August 2002 (Venice); 25 October 2002 (Ireland); 21 February 2003 (UK)
- Running time: 119 minutes
- Countries: United Kingdom; Ireland
- Language: English
- Box office: $21.1 million

The Magdalene Sisters is a 2002 drama film written and directed by Peter Mullan, about three teenage girls who were sent to Magdalene asylums (also known as Magdalene laundries), homes for women who were labelled as "fallen" by their families or society. The homes were maintained by individual religious orders, usually by the Catholic Church.

Peter Mullan has remarked that the film was initially made because victims of Magdalene asylums had received no closure in the form of recognition, compensation or apology, and many remained lifelong devout Catholics. Former Magdalene inmate Mary-Jo McDonagh told Mullan that the reality of the Magdalene asylums was much worse than depicted in the film. Some people have questioned some of the depictions of these institutions in the film.

Though set in Ireland, the film was shot entirely on location in Dumfries and Galloway, South-West Scotland. The film was distributed by Miramax, run at the time by Harvey Weinstein. The convent used for the film location was badly damaged by fire on 9 August 2022; it had been St Benedict's Convent in West Dumfries.

== Plot ==
In Ireland, 1964, so-called "fallen" women are considered sinners who needed to be redeemed. Four young women – Margaret (raped by her cousin), Bernadette (too beautiful and coquettish), Rose (an unmarried mother) and Crispina (an intellectually disabled unmarried mother) – are forced by their families or caretakers into the Magdalene asylum. The film details the disastrous lives of the four girls whilst they are inmates, portraying their harsh daily regimen and their squalid living conditions at the laundries.

Each woman suffers horrific cruelty and violence from the Mother Superior. Sister Bridget, despite her gentle-faced appearance and outwardly soft-spoken demeanour, is characterised as sadistic and almost inhuman at times, as conveyed through her merciless beating of Rose in full view of Bernadette, or when having shaved Una's head following an escape attempt, she mockingly laughs as Una hopelessly clutches at her fallen hair locks.

Sister Bridget relishes the money the business receives and it is suggested that little of it is distributed appropriately. Those who liken themselves to Mary Magdalene, who deprived herself of all pleasures of the flesh including food and drink, eat hearty breakfasts of buttered toast and bacon while the working women subsist on oatmeal porridge. In one particularly humiliating scene, the women are forced to stand naked in a line after taking a communal shower. The nuns then hold a "contest" on who has the most pubic hair, biggest bottom, biggest breasts and smallest breasts. The corruption of the resident priest, Father Fitzroy, is made very clear through his sexual abuse of Crispina. However, as the years pass, automatic washing machines start to appear, a modern household appliance whose growing ubiquity would eventually fatally undermine the economic viability of commercial laundries and make the Magdalene asylums unsustainable.

Three of the girls are shown, to some extent, to triumph over their situation and their captors. Margaret, although she is allowed to leave by the intervention of her younger brother, does not leave the asylum without leaving her mark. When she deliberately asks Sister Bridget to step aside for her to freely pass and is sharply shot down, Margaret falls to her knees in prayer. The Mother Superior is so surprised, she only moves past her after the Bishop tells her to come along. Bernadette and Rose finally decide to escape together, trashing Sister Bridget's study in search for the key to the asylum door and engaging her in a suspenseful confrontation. The two girls escape her clutches and are helped to return to the real world by a sympathetic relative, their story optimistically ending when Rose boards a coach bound for the ferry to Liverpool and Bernadette becomes an apprentice hairdresser. Crispina's end, however, is not a happy one; she spends the rest of her days in a mental institution (where she was sent to silence her from revealing the sexual abuse she suffered at the hands of Father Fitzroy) and dies of anorexia at the age of 24. The film's script is fictional, but based on four testimonies reported in the documentary Sex in a Cold Climate.

== Cast ==
- Anne-Marie Duff: Margaret McGuire
- Nora-Jane Noone: Bernadette Harvey
- Dorothy Duffy: Patricia/Rose Dunne
- Eileen Walsh: Harriet/Crispina
- Geraldine McEwan: Sister Bridget
- Daniel Costello: Father Fitzroy
- Mary Murray: Una O'Connor
- Frances Healy: Sister Jude
- Eithne McGuinness: Sister Clementine
- Phyllis MacMahon: Sister Augusta
- Britta Smith: Katy
- Rebecca Walsh: Josephine
- Eamonn Owens: Eamonn, Margaret's brother
- Chris Patrick-Simpson: Brendan
- Pete Rose: Seamus
- Peter Mullan: Mr O'Connor

== Casting ==
Noone, who played Bernadette Harvey, secured the role following an open audition held in Galway, Ireland, where at the time she was studying science in college. Her audition was praised by director Peter Mullan, who was looking for an actress versatile enough to "change drastically from being feisty and mischievous into someone very dark and damaged".

== Critical reception ==
The film received critical acclaim when it was premiered at the Venice Film Festival in 2002. There, Mullan was awarded the festival's highest prize, the Golden Lion. As of 2021, the review aggregator Rotten Tomatoes reported that 91% of critics and 89% of viewers gave the film positive reviews, based on 144 reviews. The site's consensus reads: "A typical women in prison film made untypical because it's based on real events." Metacritic reported the film had an average score of 83 out of 100, based on 38 reviews – indicating "universal acclaim". This made it the twentieth best reviewed film of the year. The film appeared on several US critics' top ten lists of the best films of 2003.

- 3rd: Ty Burr, The Boston Globe
- 6th: Michael Wilmington, Chicago Tribune
- 6th: Owen Gleiberman, Entertainment Weekly
- 7th: Jack Mathews, Daily News (New York)
- 8th: Carla Meyer, San Francisco Chronicle
- 9th: V.A. Musetto, New York Post
- 10th: Claudia Puig, USA Today

== See also ==
- Mary Norris
