= Maurice Healy =

Maurice Healy may refer to:

- Maurice Healy (politician) (1859–1923), Irish politician and lawyer
- Maurice Healy (writer) (1887–1943), Irish lawyer and author
- Maurice Healy (campaigner) (1933–2020), British consumer campaigner
