= Alex Healy =

Alex Healy may refer to:

- Alex Healy (racing driver) (born 1989), Canadian racing driver
- Alex Healy (EastEnders), soap opera character
- Alexander Healy (sheepman) (1881–1958), American sheepman
