= Francis Healy =

Francis Healy or Fran Healy may refer to:

- Fran Healy (baseball) (Francis Healy, born 1946), American baseball player and former television broadcaster
- Fran Healy (musician) (Francis Healy, born 1973), British singer and songwriter of the band Travis
- Francis Healy (baseball) (1910–1997), American baseball player
- Frank Healy (Francis Healy, born 1962), English bass guitarist of several bands including Benediction

== See also ==
- Frances Healy (born 1970), Irish actress and presenter
- Frances Healy (archaeologist), British archaeologist and prehistorian
- Healy (surname)
- Healey (surname)
