= Charlie Healy =

Charlie Healy may refer to:

- Charlie Healy (footballer) (1899–1985), Australian rules footballer for North Melbourne
- Charlie Healy (singer), English singer from The Risk, on the British TV series The X Factor

== See also ==
- Charles Healy (1883–?), American water polo player
