= Terry Healy =

Terry Healy is the name of:

- Terry Healy (footballer) (1921–2009), Australian footballer
- Terry Healy (politician) (born 1981), Australian politician
