= Augusta Fox Bronner =

American psychologist (1881–1966)

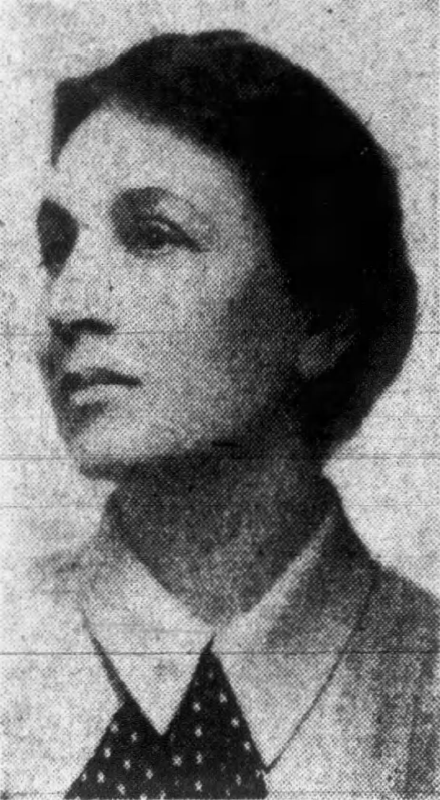
- Born: July 22, 1881; Louisville, Kentucky, U.S.
- Died: December 11, 1966 (aged 85); Clearwater, Florida, U.S.
- Education: Columbia University Teachers College (B.S., A.M., PhD)
- Occupation: Psychologist
- Spouse: William Healy (married 1932)

Augusta Fox Bronner (July 22, 1881 – December 11, 1966) was an American psychologist and criminologist, best known for her work in juvenile psychology. She co-directed the first child guidance clinic, and her research shaped psychological theories about the causes behind child delinquency, emphasizing the need to focus on social and environmental factors over inherited traits.

== Early life ==
Bronner was born July 22, 1881, in Louisville, Kentucky, to Gustave Bronner and Hanna Fox Bronner. The family was Jewish, and Augusta Fox Bronner's grandparents on both sides of the family were originally from Germany. She had two siblings, an older brother, and a younger sister.

After living in Cincinnati for several years, Bronner's family returned to Louisville, where Bronner graduated with her high school diploma in 1898.

== Education ==
Bronner's mother and grandmother both encouraged her to study and build a career. Bronner had aspired to be a teacher since youth, and after high school, she pursued an educator's certification at the Louisville Normal School. She dropped out briefly, due to eye problems, and spent a year traveling in Europe with her aunt before returning to the Normal School and graduating in 1901.

After enrolling in the Columbia University Teachers College, Bronner completed her bachelor's degree (B.S.) in 1906, soon followed by her master's degree (A.M.) in 1909. During her studies, she worked part-time grading papers for psychologist Edward L. Thorndike. She returned to Louisville briefly, teaching at the local Louisville Girls' High School – her old school – until her father died in 1911. Then she began her doctoral studies at the Teachers' College, working with Thorndike.

In 1914, Bronner completed her doctoral degree and published her dissertation, entitled A Comparative Study of the Intelligence of Delinquent Girls. Bronner's research showed that there was no correlation between delinquency and mental disability, undermining the common notion of the time that criminal behavior was passed down through biological factors.

== Career ==
In 1913, while taking a summer course at Harvard University, Bronner met Chicago neurologist and professor William Healy. Healy was equally interested in the study of child delinquency, and subsequently hired Bronner to work as a psychologist at his Chicago Juvenile Psychopathic Institute. In 1914, the institute was renamed the Psychopathic Clinic of the Juvenile Court, and Bronner soon became the assistant director. Bronner and Healy proceeded to shape the study and treatment of delinquent youth, contributing to the scientific understanding that most juvenile crimes stemmed from environmental factors instead of hereditary, or genetic, factors. Among other research, she identified that delinquency often arose as a result of placing children with learning disabilities or special abilities in the wrong kinds of educational environments.

In 1917, Bronner and Healy took up new positions at the Judge Baker Foundation of Boston (later the Judge Baker Children's Center), a new publicly funded child guidance clinic attached to the Boston juvenile court. Bronner handled most of the psychological examinations of youth, as well as interviews with girls and the youngest children. In 1927, Bronner and Healy wrote the influential Manual of Individual Mental Tests and Testing, a comprehensive guide to assessing a patient's mental state. Although Healy was originally given the full position of director, with Bronner acting as assistant director, Bronner eventually became co-director of the Foundation in 1930. The Judge Baker Foundation soon became a model for other child guidance clinics across the country, with its co-directors developing important psychiatric practices such as the "team" method, in which psychologists worked together with social workers and physicians to treat a patient.

On November 19, 1930, Bronner and Healy were invited by President Herbert Hoover to attend the White House Conference on Child Health and Protection.

During the 1930s, Bronner also worked briefly in New Haven, Connecticut, as Director of the short-lived Research Institute of Human Relations at Yale University. She was president of the American Orthopsychiatric Association in 1932.

== Publications and theoretical perspectives ==
After her dissertation, Bronner published The Psychology of Special Abilities and Disabilities in 1917. In it, she emphasized the importance of finding tasks that individuals are best suited for and adjusting educational and occupational efforts. Instead of focusing on individuals' disability, we should instead focus on what they enjoy and/or succeed at. Her book has been reprinted multiple times, and helped to augment the vocational testing movement.

=== Attitude as a factor in psychological testing ===
Bronner's 1916 article "Attitude as it Affects Performances of Tests" explored how certain factors could affect test results: She emphasized that the way an individual approaches a task can influence their success or failure. She cited Edward Thorndike and his laws of learning, which include attitude as an influencing factor. Bronner asserted there is no way to study attitude experimentally: rather, it can be studied only through observation. Mental testing, noted Bronner, serves to find a person's potential.

At that time, practical problems in psychology were approached on the basis of mental tests in laboratories. Bronner argued that many real-life factors can influence one's performance on such tests. She also noted that results from a psychological examiner could dictate a person's future care and education. Bronner and others studied people's attitudes within courtrooms. A psychological lab should meet the following factors: a quiet room, free from distraction, with proper lighting and ventilation. Bronner also discussed the influence onlookers can have on both the examiner and examinee, concluding there should be no onlookers. Bronner depicted some common attitudes psychologists had observed while administering adolescents the Binet test, that impacted their evaluation. She also discussed environmental factors that can impact performance.

=== Collaborations with William Healy ===
As her personal and professional relationship with William Healy grew, Bronner retreated from publishing her individual work, preferring to co-write with Healy. In collaboration with Healy, Bronner published multiple books on juvenile psychology, including Reconstructing behavior in youth: A study of problem children in foster families (1929), Treatment and what happened afterward (1939), and What makes a child delinquent? (1948). They also wrote many articles including "How does the School Produce or Prevent Delinquency? (1933). Their article highlighted delinquent behavior in school aged human as resulting from incorrect adjustments made by the school, such as forcing children to repeat a grade or placing them in grades below their current one. They begin to not trust the education system, lack excitement, and become complacent with their education. They find ways to become excited, such as partaking in criminal behavior.

== Personal life and retirement ==
In September 1932, after Healy's wife died, he and Bronner finally married. According to biographer John C. Burnham, marriage changed very little about their professional relationship, its only effects being the easier facilitation of their working together on evenings and weekends and "complicating administration of the clinic" whenever the couple went on vacation together.

A shortage of staff during World War II prolonged Bronner and Healy's work at the Judge Baker Foundation, despite retirement plans. After the couple finally retired in 1946, Bronner destroyed most of her own personal research and unpublished papers, preferring to keep the public's focus on her husband's academic work. Bronner and Healy spent their retirement in Clearwater, Florida.

== Death ==
Bronner died in Clearwater on December 11, 1966.
