= Dorothy Duffy =

Irish actress

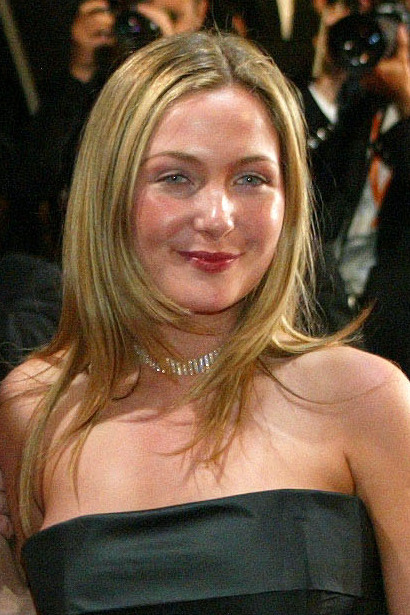
- Duffy in 2003
- Occupation: Actress

Dorothy Duffy is an Irish actress. She is best known for her performance as Rose / Patricia in The Magdalene Sisters.
