= Eirlys Roberts =

Welsh consumer advocate and campaigner

- Born: 3 January 1911; Caerphilly, Wales
- Died: 18 March 2008 (aged 97); London
- Citizenship: United Kingdom
- Occupation: Consumer campaigner
- Known for: Which?

Eirlys Rhiwen Cadwaladr Roberts CBE (3 January 1911 – 18 March 2008) was a Welsh consumer advocate and campaigner, and a co-founder of the Consumers' Association. She edited Which? magazine from 1957 to 1973.

== Early life ==
Roberts was born in Caerphilly, in 1911 to a Welsh father and Scottish mother. She attended school in Clapham, southwest London, and read classics at Girton College, Cambridge. Her first job was in Majorca as classics adviser to Robert Graves while he was writing I, Claudius. Following this she worked as a sub-editor for Amalgamated Press. During World War 2 she worked in military intelligence and in 1941 married John Cullen; the marriage did not last and they had no children. For two years after the war she worked for the United Nations in Albania. On returning home she joined the Civil Service at the Treasury, where she worked for 10 years. Princeton University Library, USA, holds a document collection of materials compiled by Roberts between 1935 and 1977, including unpublished fiction and nonfiction manuscripts, diaries and private letters.

== Consumer campaigner ==
Roberts was involved in the foundation of the Consumers' Association from its start and was for a time its head of research, and particularly editor of Which? magazine from 1957 to 1973. Maurice Healy succeeded her as editor.

She was active on consumer affairs in the EEC from 1973 and served on the Royal Commission of the Press from 1974 to 1977. She was a freelance writer for The Observer and in 1971 presented a paper entitled Is persuasion a science? to the symposium The Future of Man at the Royal Geographical Society in London. Roberts was appointed director of the Bureau of European Consumer Organisations in 1972 and served until 1978. She was a member of the Economic and Social Committee of the EEC (1973–82) and was founder, chairman and chief executive of the European Research Institute for Consumer Affairs from 1978-1997, campaigning for clarity of language in publications.

== Personal life ==
Eirlys Roberts lived for much of her life in Islington, using her married name in private life. Her Scottish mother gave her a pride in her Scottish ancestry, and she enjoyed mountain walking there. While there in 1982 she campaigned for Roy Jenkins in a Glasgow by-election. The previous year she had been one of the 100 signatories to a letter to The Guardian in support of the newly formed SDP.

Roberts moved to Forest Hill in the 1990s, where she died in 2008.

== Selected works ==
- Roberts, Eirlys. Consumers. 1966. C. A. Watts & Co. ISBN 978-0296347560
- Roberts, Eirlys (1982). Which? 25 : Consumers' Association 1957–1982. London: Consumers' Association. ISBN 0852022417.
- Evans, Gareth (author) and Roberts, Eirlys (translator) Rol a Statws Merched yn yr Ugeinfed Ganrif (The role of women as consumers). 1966. ISBN 978-1856443692
