= William Healy =

William Healy may refer to:

- Will Healy (William Livingston Healy; born 1985), American football coach at the University of North Carolina at Charlotte
- William Healy (judge) (1881–1962), United States federal judge
- William J. Healy (1939–2001), member of the Ohio House of Representatives
- William J. Healy II (born 1960s), mayor of Canton, Ohio
- William Healy (actor) (born 2001), television actor
- William Healy (neurologist) (1869–1963), British-American psychiatrist and criminologist
- William Healy (javelin thrower), American javelin thrower, 4th at the 1924 United States Olympic trials
