= Ben Healy =

Ben Healy may refer to:

- Ben Healy (cyclist) (born 2000), Irish cyclist
- Ben Healy (rugby union) (born 1999), Scottish rugby union player
