= Brendan Healy =

American lacrosse player

Personal information
- Nationality: American
- Born: August 4, 1983 (age 42) Columbus, Ohio, U.S.
- Height: 5 ft 11 in (180 cm)
- Weight: 176 lb (80 kg; 12 st 8 lb)

Sport
- Position: Midfield
- MLL team Former teams: Chicago Machine; Washington Bayhawks
- NCAA team: University of Maryland, College Park
- Pro career: 2006–2009

Brendan Healy (born August 4, 1983) was a professional lacrosse player for the Washington Bayhawks and the Chicago Machine of Major League Lacrosse.

== Professional career ==
In his first season with the Baltimore Bayhawks, Brendan played in ten games and scored ten goals as a rookie. He was selected 13th overall in the 2006 MLL Collegiate Draft.

In 2007, with the Washington Bayhawks, Healy played in 10 out of the 12 regular season games and scored nine goals, with three two-point goals, totaling twelve points in total. He also recorded 23 ground balls.

In 2008, Healy played in 12 games for the Washington Bayhawks and scored 19 goals, including two 2 pointers.

Healy’s final year in the MLL was 2009, where he was traded to the Chicago Machine, but played in no games for either team.

== College career ==
Played college lacrosse at the University of Maryland, College Park under coach Dave Cottle, where he was a three-time Honorable Mention All-American. He scored 32 points as a captain his senior year, and ended his career with 60 goals and 28 assists.

== Personal ==
Healy grew up in Great Falls, VA, and is a 2009 graduate of The Ohio State University Moritz College of Law. Brendan is also a member of the State Bar of Ohio. His brother Ian Healy also plays for the Washington Bayhawks, and was a teammate at the University of Maryland. Brendan currently resides in Upper Arlington, OH where he is a Vice President at an investment banking firm. He lives with his wife Georgina Flower-Healy and their two dogs Wilbur and Farley.

In May 2015, the Healy's welcomed triplets into their family.
