= Dan Healy =

Dan Healy may refer to:

- Dan Healy (detective) (c. 1895–1980), Chicago detective, famous for killing the leader of the North Side Gang, Vincent Drucci
- Dan Healy (soundman), audio engineer for The Grateful Dead
- Dan Healy (actor) (né Daniel Joseph Healy; 1888–1969), New York actor and theater MC, 3rd husband of Helen Kane
- Daniel Healy (born 1974), Australian rules footballer
- Daniel Healy (actor), Scottish actor
- Daniel Healy (triple jumper), winner of the standing triple jump at the 1910 USA Indoor Track and Field Championships
