= Margaret Healy =

Irish singer-songwriter

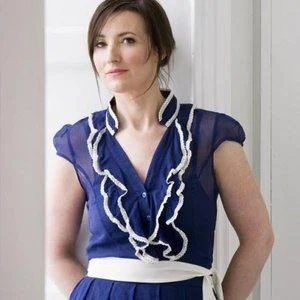
- Margaret Healy in 2009

Background information
- Born: November 30, 1969 (age 55); Dublin, Ireland
- Genres: Acoustic, Hip hop, Electro

Margaret Healy is an Irish singer-songwriter. She specializes in acoustic ballads but also shows the influence of hip-hop and electro in her music.

Healy started touring the Dublin singer-songwriter circuit in 1999 and released her first album, margaret healy...and you are?, in 2001. The album was a collaboration with South Bank Awards winner and Mercury nominee Nitin Sawhney in his London Dance studio and Pat Barrett (Ten Speed Racer) and Ken Burke (Fusebox) in Dublin. Reviews were generally positive and marked Healy as an up-and-coming talent. She has toured widely in Ireland to support the album, and the video for the track Call It a Moment has received some airplay. The track Something Real was included on several media projects:

- Sirens, a compilation CD of female independent label artists including Patti Smith, PJ Harvey, Sinéad O'Connor, and Ani Di Franco
- The Ruby Sessions, a compilation CD of Irish artists
- The Big Bow Wow, RTÉ TV series aired in January 2004

Healy's second album, Girls, Boys & Clockwork Toys, was released in April 2009.
