= Jack H. Healy =

American visionary geophysicist (born 1929)

Jack H. Healy (1929-2012)
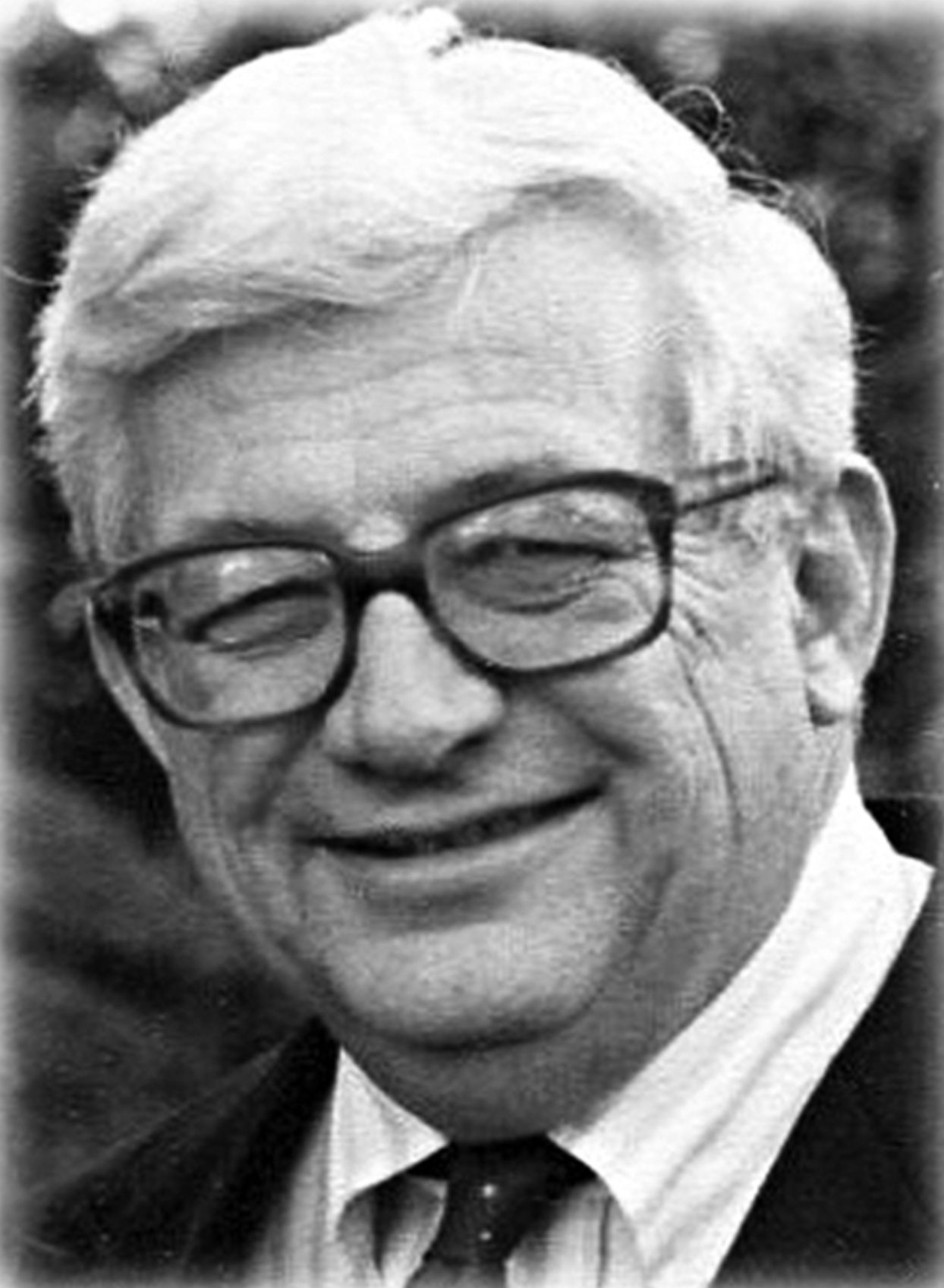
- US Geological Survey Geophysicist

Jack H. Healy (August 7, 1929 – March 6, 2012) was an American visionary geophysicist who worked at the US Geological Survey from 1965 to 1995. During his time at the USGS, Healy along with Lou Pakiser, Jerry Eaton, and Barry Raleigh founded the National Center for Earthquake Research at the US Geological Survey.

== Early life ==
Born in Chicago, Illinois and raised in Wausau, Wisconsin, Healy was an only child who lived with his father and mother. His father died when he was only 12 and his mother died when he was 16, leaving him on his own until he graduated high school.

He traveled to Nova Scotia for a research program in 1949. There he met his lifelong partner Mary MacDonald and they married in 1951. He is succeeded by five children, Anne, Joan, Paul, Brian, and Margaret.

While at MIT, Healy joined the Reserve Officers' Training Corps (ROTC) where he graduated as a second Lieutenant. He worked at the US Air Force Cambridge Research Center in Boston from 1951-1953.

== Education ==
Healy attended Massachusetts Institute of Technology in 1947 and finished his senior thesis in 1951. His thesis was based on geological field work conducted in 1949 in Nova Scotia supervised by Professor Walter L. Whitehead and Professor Robert. R Shrock. The thesis argued that a suite of rocks that had been identified as intrusive was actually extrusive in origin.

In 1956, Healy was accepted into graduate studies at Caltech. During his time there (1956-1961), his research and thesis revolved around shallow seismic refraction and gravity data from several basins on the eastern flank of the Sierra Nevada. He was mentored by Professor Frank Press, Professor Clarence Allen, and the famous Professor Charles Francis Richter creator of the Richter magnitude scale.

== Work ==
After working for the military, Healy worked in the oil exploration industry as a seismic 'doodlebugger' in Louisiana.

Fresh out of graduate school, Healy was hired by the US Geological Survey Branch of Crustal Studies in Denver, Colorado. At the time, the branch was funded by the Department of Defense and research carried out was related to the monitoring of underground nuclear tests by studying seismic wave propagation.

After the 1964 earthquake in Alaska, a panel of the National Academy of Sciences suggested implementing a ten-year program of earthquake prediction research. Leadership for this program was provided by Healy, Lou Pakiser, Jerry Eaton and Barry Raleigh. Though short term earthquake prediction is no longer considered realistic, the earthquake research center provided the foundation for the present USGS Earthquake Science Center.

In 1968 a series of earthquakes occurred in Denver, and it was hypothesized that these earthquakes were caused by the injection of chemical waste fluids at a deep disposal well at the US Army's Rocky Mountain Arsenal. It was this incident that sparked Healy's inspiration and interest in the physics and statistics of earthquakes.

Healy and his colleagues found that variations in seismicity correlated with the amount of fluid pressure in the seismically active zone. It is here that he started studying deep scientific drilling in fault zones. Mark D. Zoback was hired by the USGS in 1975 and he and Healy began to revolutionize deep drilling by making in situ stress measurements along the San Andreas fault. The results of their research and paper led to the development of a project called the San Andreas Fault Observatory at Depth.
