= Siobhan Healy =

Scottish artist and designer (born 1976)

- Born: 1976 (age 49–50); Glasgow, Scotland
- Education: Edinburgh College of Art 2002-2005
- Known for: Glass Art, Goldsmith, Precious metal and diamond dust art prints.
- Awards: Swarovski Design Award; 2016; The International Glass Prize; 2012 Public Prize; Creative Development Award, Creative Scotland; 2010
- Website: www.healyarts.com

Siobhan Healy (born 1976) is a Scottish artist and designer of glass art, goldsmithing and figurative sculpture. Her work is held in the collections of The Scottish Parliament Art Collection, Harvard Museum of Natural History/Herbarium, Glasmuseum Lette, Germany, The Heritage Collection, Clackmannanshire Council and the Perth Art Gallery.

== Biography ==
Healy is an alumna of Edinburgh College of Art. She was part of the 2018 Edinburgh Art Festival with Biodiversity in collaboration with Glasgow artist and writer Alasdair Gray. She has had two more collaborative exhibitions with Gray including and developing the theme of biodiversity.

Her work is often inspired by rare species of flora and fauna, some from the Galápagos Islands where Healy made a research trip to Charles Darwin Research Station in 2017. Another strand of Healy's research is highlighting obscure museum collections such as the Illuminating Letters exhibition at The Lighthouse, Glasgow Centre of Design Excellence, in which Healy highlighted the personal letters of Charles Rennie Mackintosh and combined and collaged text and imagery with personal correspondence that Healy had received from David Attenborough.

For the Amazon series Outlander she was commissioned to make specialist glassware.

Healy currently works at Glasgow Sculpture Studios.

== Publications ==
- Myth/Reality. Contemporary Artists from Scotland. Imago Mundi. Antiga Edizioni 2017.
- New Glass Review 33. Corning Museum of Glass 2012. (pages 21 & 70).
- Migrate: 30yrs of Scottish Glass. 2009 (page 18). Exhibition catalogue for 2009 annual exhibition of the Scottish Glass Society.

== Awards ==
- Public Prize of the International Glass Prize, Belgium, in 2012, a triennial competition for arts, design and crafts.
- Creative Scotland Open Project, Development Award, 2018. 'Biodiversity' - production & presentation costs Edinburgh Art Festival & Pollok House, Glasgow
- Swarovski Design Award, 2016.
- Scottish Government New Arts Sponsorship Grant: Arts and Business Partnerships, 2012.

== Artwork ==
- Unique glass artwork commissioned by Clackmannanshire Council and made in collaboration with Alasdair Gray. This artwork was lost.
- 'Champions' - glass sculpture for Contemporary Glass Society 'Glass Games' exhibition for London 2012 Olympics.

== Selected solo and group exhibitions ==
=== Solo exhibitions ===
- ‘Illuminating Letters’ The Lighthouse, Glasgow Centre for Design & Architecture, 2017–18.
- ‘Botanics’ at the Burrell Collection, Glasgow Museums, Glasgow, 2016.
- ‘Ghost Orchids’ Touring show – Royal Botanic Garden Edinburgh, Nov 2011- April 2012.
- Harvard Museum of Natural History, USA, Dec 2011-March 2012.
- Glasgow Botanic Gardens. April-Sept 2011
- ‘Intae Space’, City Art Centre, Art/Science Collaboration with ASCUS, Edinburgh, 2012.
- Medical Illustration Services, Glasgow Royal infirmary, 2008.

=== Collaborative exhibitions ===
- with Alasdair Gray – 'Biodiversity' at Edinburgh College of Art also concurrently at Pollok House, National Trust for Scotland, 2018.
- with Alasdair Gray – 'Apothecary' at Gracefield Arts Centre, Scotland, 2019.
- with Alasdair Gray – Six Foot Gallery, Glasgow by Orkidstudio, Scotland, 2019.

=== Group exhibitions ===
- ‘Inside Out’ Coburg Gallery, Edinburgh, 2015.
- Johanasfors Gallery. Sweden, 2013.
- ‘New Acquisitions Exhibition’ Glasmuseum Lette, Germany, 2013.
- International Glass Prize Exhibition, Lommel, Belgium, 2012.
- The British Glass Biennale. Stourbridge, UK, 2012.
- Glass Games: International Exhibition of Glass Art. Curated by Contemporary Glass Society. London, UK. 2012.
- ‘Unite’ Curated by Craft Scotland at Collins Gallery, Glasgow, UK. 2011.
- ‘Trove’ Perth Museum and Art Gallery. UK, 2011.
- ‘Migrate’ Broadfield House Glass Museum, Stourbridge, UK, 2010.
