= Michael Healy =

Michael Healy may refer to:

- Michael A. Healy (1839–1904), U.S. Revenue Cutter Service officer
- Michael Healy (statistician) (1923–2016), British statistician
- Mike Healy (Oz), a fictional character in the HBO show Oz
- Michael D. Healy (1926–2018), U.S. Army general
- Michael Healy (hurler) (born 1978), Irish hurler
- Michael Healy (artist) (1873–1941), Irish stained glass artist
- Michael Healy (politician) (born 1964), Australian politician
- Michael Healy-Rae (born 1967), Irish politician, Teachta Dála for the Kerry constituency (from 2016)

== See also ==
- Michael Healey, Canadian playwright and actor
