= Patrick Healy =

Patrick Healy, Pat Healy, Patrick Healey or Pat Healey may refer to:

- Felix Healy (Patrick Joseph Healy, born 1955), former Northern Irish football player and manager
- Pat Healy (actor) (born 1971), American actor, writer, and director
- Pat Healey (born 1985), American soccer player
- Pat Healy (fighter) (born 1983), American mixed martial arts fighter
- Pat Healy (hurler) (1938–1970), Cork hurler
- Patrick Healy (journalist) (born 1971), New York Times journalist and editor
- Patrick Francis Healy (1830–1910), African American Jesuit and President of Georgetown University
- Patrick Healy (judge), Quebec judge
- Patrick Healy (rugby union), Irish international rugby union player
- Patrick Healy (sheepman), Irish-born American railroad engineer, sheepman and businessman

Fictional characters

- Pat Healy, investigator in the film There's Something About Mary
- Patricia (Pat) Healy in the film WarGames
