= Charlie Healy (footballer) =

Australian rules footballer

Personal information
- Full name: Charles Michael Healy
- Born: 5 September 1899; Flemington, Victoria
- Died: 18 March 1985 (aged 85); Mordialloc, Victoria
- Original team: Kensington
- Position: Halfback / Rover

Playing career^{1}
| Years | Club | Games (Goals) |
| 1925–30 | North Melbourne | 81 (23) |
- ^{1} Playing statistics correct to the end of 1930.

Charles Michael Healy (5 September 1899 – 18 March 1985) was a former Australian rules footballer who played with North Melbourne in the Victorian Football League (VFL).
