= Sean Healy =

American multimedia artist

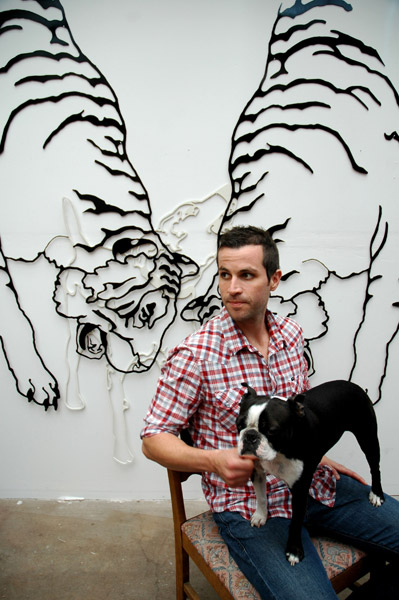
- Born: New York
- Occupation: Multimedia Artist

Sean P. Healy is a multimedia artist based in Portland, Oregon.

Healy's work often explores the rationales of social power structures utilizing everything from chewing gum to resin, cigarette butts and large sliding glass doors.

He is the youngest artist to have been awarded a General Services Administration Public Art Commission, and in 2006 completed a project for Thom Mayne’s federal courthouse in Eugene, Oregon. His project for the FBI Headquarters in Houston, Texas was completed in 2008 and coincided with a solo show at the Betty Moody Gallery. Other noteworthy group shows were; Oregon Biennial (1999), Fresh Trouble (2005) and THE HOOK UP (2007)

Healy received his BFA in printmaking from Alfred University. He has had numerous one-person exhibitions both at the Elizabeth Leach Gallery and at spaces such as The Art Gym.
