= Matt Healy (disambiguation) =

Matt Healy may refer to:

- Matty Healy, born 1989, English musician
- Matt Healy (actor), born 1970, Scottish actor appearing in Emmerdale
- Matt Healy (footballer), born 2002, Irish footballer
- Matt Healy (rugby player), born 1989, Irish rugby player
