= Jack Heal =

Australian rules footballer, born 1919

Personal information
- Full name: Jack Heal
- Born: 23 February 1919; Albany, Western Australia
- Died: 8 December 1988 (aged 69); New South Wales
- Original team: West Perth

Playing career^{1}
Years	Club	Games (Goals)
1942	Melbourne	3 (1)
- ^{1} Playing statistics correct to the end of 1942.

Jack Heal (23 February 1919 – 8 December 1988) was an Australian rules footballer who played with West Perth in the West Australian Football League (WAFL) and Melbourne in the Victorian Football League (VFL).
