= Michael Heal =

English cricketer (born 1948)

Cricket information
- Batting: Right-handed
- Bowling: Right-arm medium

Career statistics
Competition	First-class	List A
Matches	22	1
Runs scored	634	6
Batting average	15.92	6.00
100s/50s	1/1	0/0
Top score	124*	6
Balls bowled	6	–
Wickets	0	–
Bowling average	–	–
5 wickets in innings	–	–
10 wickets in match	–	–
Best bowling	–	–
Catches/stumpings	10/–	0/–
- Source: Cricinfo, 8 November 2022

Michael George Heal (born 8 September 1948) is a former English first-class cricketer who played for Oxford University in the late 1960s and early 1970s, winning a Blue in 1970 and 1972. He also played for Gloucestershire's Second XI, and had one List A outing for their first team in 1973. He was born in Bristol.

As a career batting average of under 16 shows, Heal was generally unsuccessful as a batsman, but against Warwickshire in April 1972 he made an unbeaten 124, the highest score by far of his first-class career, to help set up a two-wicket victory. His only other half-century was 64 against Glamorgan in 1970.

He also played rugby union for Oxford University, winning a Blue for that as well.
