= Timothy Healy =

Timothy Healy may refer to:

- Tim Healy (actor) (born 1952), British actor
- Tim Healy (politician) (1855–1931), Irish parliamentary politician, later Governor-General of the Irish Free State
- Timothy Healy (trade unionist) (1863–1930), American trade union official and political activist
- Timothy S. Healy (1923–1992), president of Georgetown University

== See also ==
- Timothy J. Healey, American mathematician
