= Dick Healy =

Australian rugby league footballer and administrator

Personal information
- Full name: Richard Joseph Healy
- Born: c1921
- Died: 5 November 2013; Hornsby, New South Wales

Playing information
- Position: Prop
Club
Years	Team	Pld	T	G	FG	P
1945–48	St. George	33	8	0	0	24
1949	Eastern Suburbs	5	0	0	0	0
	Total	38	8	0	0	24

Richard Joseph Healy (1922-2013) was an Australian rugby league footballer who played in the 1940s.

Healy was graded at St. George in 1945 and was mainly the Reserve Grade prop forward during his career although he did play 33 first grade games with the club.

After his marriage in 1948, he moved out of the area and due to residential rules of the time he was told to play with Eastern Suburbs by the NSWRFL, playing one season with the tri-colours in 1949.

Healy died on 5 November 2013.
