= Steve Healy =

Australian sporting administrator and lawyer

- Organization(s): Dentons Tennis Australia International Tennis Federation Melbourne & Olympic Parks Trust
- Known for: Sports administration Lawyer

Steve Healy is an Australian sporting administrator and lawyer. He was the President of Tennis Australia until 2017 and Vice-President of the International Tennis Federation until 2015. He was also President of the Oceania Tennis Federation and a Trustee of the Melbourne & Olympic Parks Trust.
