= Tucka Healy =

American soccer player (born 1962)

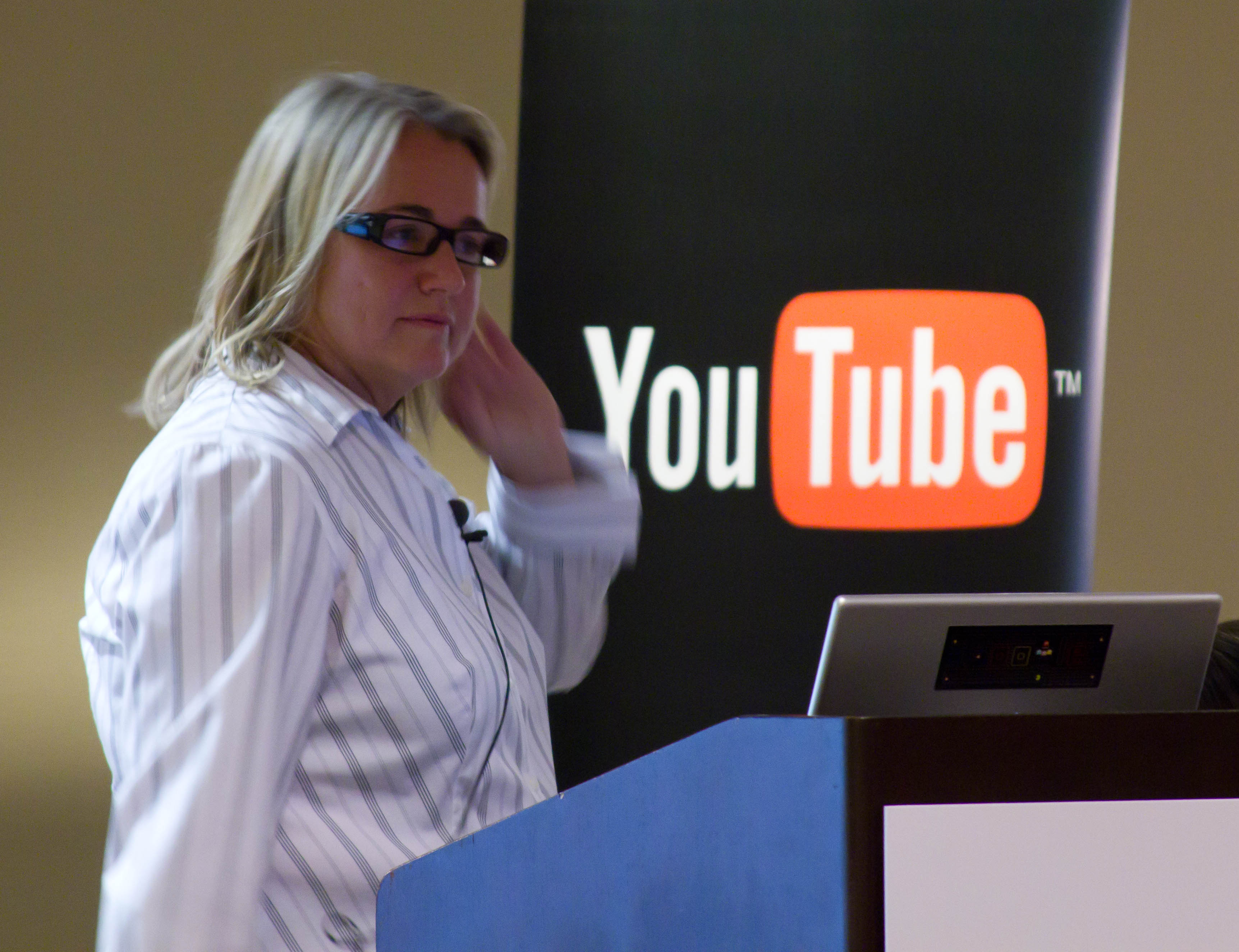
- Healy at VidCon in 2010

Personal information
- Full name: Margaret J. Healy
- Date of birth: September 20, 1962 (age 64)
- Place of birth: Colorado, United States
- Position: Forward

College career
Years	Team	Apps	(Gls)
1981–1985	California Golden Bears	?	(45+)

Senior career*
Years	Team	Apps	(Gls)
- California Tremors
- San Francisco Vikings

International career
1985	United States	3	(0)
- * Club domestic league appearances and goals

Margaret J. "Tucka" Healy (born September 20, 1962) is an American former soccer player who played as a forward, making three appearances for the United States women's national team. She later worked as an employee for Google.

== Career ==
In college, Healy played for the California Golden Bears from 1981 to 1985, though she missed the 1984 season. Her first season in 1981 was under the AIAW, while the remaining were in the NCAA. In her NCAA career, she scored 45 goals and had 10 assists. She was an NSCAA Third Team All-American in 1983 and 1985, and was included in the NSCAA All-Region team in 1985. In 2015, she was inducted into the "Lair of Legends" of the California Golden Bears, as part of the athletics hall of fame.

Healy made her international debut for the United States in the team's inaugural match on August 18, 1985 at the Mundialito against hosts Italy. In total, she made three appearances for the U.S. at the tournament, earning her final cap on August 24, 1985 against Denmark.

== Personal life ==
Healy was born to Mary and John Helding "Jack" Healy, one of five children. At a young age, her family moved from the Denver area to Palo Alto, California. Healy was employee 81 at Google in Mountain View, California, where she worked as an enterprise sales manager, and later for the YouTube partner program, Google Fiber, and YouTube TV.

== Career statistics ==
=== International ===
United States
Year	Apps	Goals
1985	3	0
Total	3	0
