= Yvonne Healy =

Yvonne Healy is a professional Irish storyteller who regularly performs at Midwest, national, and international Irish festivals, story slams, conferences, and other spoken word events. As a child, she and her family moved to the United States from Ireland. Many of her stories come from both her experience as an Irish immigrant and from her family background, including stories of her grandfather, Christy Robinson. Along with true stories, Healy's repertoire includes revived Irish myths, folktales, and legends. She has also published several articles in industry magazines such as Storytelling Magazine and the Michigan Humanities Council's newsletter, as well as written versions of her stories in short-story collections.

Healy was ranked as the #1 traditional Irish storyteller in the U.S. by Liam O Maolaodha, director of Ireland’s Oireachtas na Gaeilge at the 2012 North American Gaeltacht, at which she also received an award for her storytelling performance given in Gaelic.

On the national scene, Healy serves on the board of directors of the National Storytelling Network. She served as Chair of the Board from 2014 through 2015, during which the NSN relocated its headquarters from Jonesborough, Tennessee to Kansas City, Missouri.
