= Catherine Healy =

Catherine Healy may refer to:

- Catherine Healy (activist), founder of the New Zealand Prostitutes' Collective
- Catherine Healy (chef) (died 1993), Michelin-starred head chef of restaurant Dunderry Lodge in Ireland
