= Jim Heal =

American football coach

Coaching career (HC unless noted)
- 1983–1988: West Virginia Tech

Head coaching record
- Overall: 26–32–2

Jim Heal is an American football coach. He served as the head football coach at West Virginia University Institute of Technology in Montgomery, West Virginia for 6 seasons, from 1983 to 1988, compiling a record of 26–32–2.
