= USS Healy =

Fletcher-class destroyer

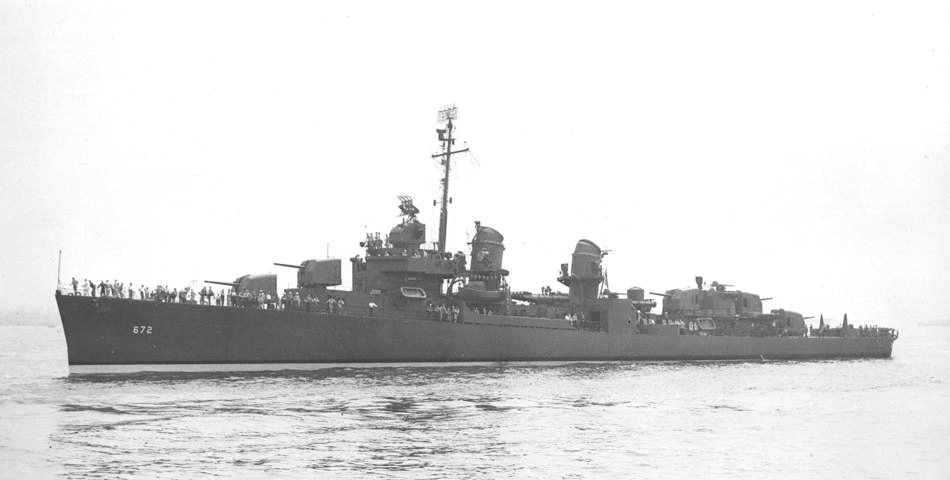
- USS Healy (DD-672) underway c1943

History

United States
- Namesake: Howard R. Healy
- Builder: Federal Shipbuilding & Dry Dock Co., Kearny, N.J.
- Laid down: 4 March 1943
- Launched: 4 July 1943
- Commissioned: 3 September 1943
- Decommissioned: 11 March 1958
- Stricken: 1 December 1974
- Fate: Sold for scrap, 12 April 1976

General characteristics
- Class & type: Fletcher-class destroyer
- Displacement: 2,050 tons
- Length: 376 ft 6 in (114.7 m)
- Beam: 39 ft 8 in (12.1 m)
- Draft: 17 ft 9 in (5.4 m)
- Propulsion: 60,000 shp (45 MW); geared turbines; 2 propellers
- Speed: 37 knots (69 km/h; 43 mph)
- Range: 6,500 nautical miles at 15 kn (12,000 km at 30 km/h)
- Complement: 319
- Armament: 5 × 5 in (130 mm)/38 cal guns, 4 × 40 mm AA guns, 4 × 20 mm AA guns, 10 × 21 inch (533 mm) torpedo tubes, 6 × depth charge projectors, 2 × depth charge tracks

USS Healy (DD-672) was a Fletcher-class destroyer of the United States Navy.

== Namesake ==
Howard R. Healy was born on 28 March 1899 in Chelsea, Massachusetts. He graduated from the United States Naval Academy in 1922. After serving on various ships of the fleet and as an instructor at the Naval Academy, Healy commanded the USS Dorsey from 1937 to 1939.

After a tour at Naval Torpedo Station Newport, Commander Healy reported on 13 March 1941 as Damage Control Officer on board the aircraft carrier USS Lexington. During the Battle of the Coral Sea, Lexington took two torpedoes and two bomb hits on 8 May 1942 and despite damage control could not be saved. Healy died on board and was posthumously awarded the Bronze Star.

== Construction and commissioning ==
Healy was launched by Federal Shipbuilding & Dry Dock Co., Kearny, N.J., on 4 July 1943; sponsored by Mrs. Howard R. Healy, widow of the namesake; and commissioned at New York Navy Yard on 3 September 1943.

== Service history ==
=== World War II ===
After completing her shakedown cruise off Bermuda, Healy returned to New York 31 October. The ship departed for a week of coastal patrol on 10 November, and after meeting a convoy at sea steamed into Norfolk, Va. on 18 November 1943. Two days later she cleared port en route to the Pacific, and after transiting the Panama Canal arrived San Francisco, Calif. on 4 December. From there she proceeded to Pearl Harbor, and after arrival on 11 December spent several weeks training in Hawaiian waters with Yorktown and other ships which would become the famous Task Force 58 (TF 58) under Vice Admiral Marc Mitscher.

==== January–September 1944 ====
The Navy had begun its gigantic island campaign in the Pacific with the capture of the Gilberts, and Healy departed on 16 January 1944 for the second major operation, the capture of the Marshall Islands. Until being detached from the group 1 February, Healy screened Enterprise and Yorktown during devastating raids on installations on the target islands, including Kwajalein. Healy was assigned 1 February to escort Washington and Indiana to Majuro, and rendezvoused with the carriers there 4 February.

Healy's next major operation was the neutralization of Truk, a major Japanese naval base in the Pacific. Departing Majuro 12 February, the carrier group attacked Truk 17–18 February with striking thoroughness, sinking or rendering useless most of the shipping and aircraft and eliminating Truk as a major threat to the allied plans. After the raid Healy and the carriers steamed to the Marianas, fought off several air attacks 22 February, and delivered important strikes against Saipan, Tinian, and Guam, America's next objectives in the Pacific.

Prior to the Marianas invasion, however, Healy screened Enterprise on a series of raids in the western Pacific designed to aid the coming operations. After a stop at Espiritu Santo the ships struck the Palau Islands 30 March, and after beating off Japanese air raids launched an attack on Yap and Ulithi the next day. Enterprise planes attacked Woleai 1 April 1944, and returned to Majuro five days later. Healy put to sea again 14 April to screen Enterprise during strikes on New Guinea, supporting operations and landings at Tanahmerah Bay. Another heavy raid on the Japanese base at Truk 29–30 April completed this highly successful operation, and she returned to Majuro 4 May.

After a period of intensive training and preparation, she departed Majuro on 6 June for the invasion of the Marianas, a spectacular amphibious operation to be carried out nearly 1,000 miles (1,800 km) from the nearest advance base, Eniwetok. Again acting as screening ship for the carriers, Healy supported softening-up raids 11–15 June and protected them during the period of direct support as Admiral Richmond Kelly Turner's Marines went ashore on Saipan on 15 June.

Two days later, Healy and the other ships steamed out to join Admiral Mitscher's carrier task force as the Japanese made preparations to close the Marianas for a decisive naval battle. The great fleets approached each other on 19 June for the biggest carrier engagement of the war: the Battle of the Philippine Sea. As four large air raids hit the American dispositions, fighter cover from the ships of Healy's task group and surface fire from the ships decimated the Japanese formations. With able assistance from American submarines, Mitscher succeeded in sinking two Japanese carriers in addition to inflicting fatal losses on the enemy naval air arm during "The Great Marianas Turkey Shoot" on 19 June. Healy helped rescue pilots from downed aircraft on 21 June, and arrived Eniwetok on 9 July. The Marianas invasion had been secured and the enemy threat turned back.

Getting underway again on 17 June, Healy's carrier task force launched repeated strikes on Guam, steamed into the Carolines, and commenced strikes against the Palaus 25 July. Continuing to cruise with Task Force 58, Healy screened the carriers during strikes on the Bonin and Volcano Islands on 4–5 August before returning to Eniwetok on 11 August 1944. Sailing again on 28 August, the group hit the Bonins, Palaus, and various targets in the Philippines until 17 September. Healy was detached that date and joined a carrier task group for direct support of the Peleliu invasion, the next step on the island road to Japan.

==== October–December 1944 ====
The destroyer returned with her carrier group to Manus Island on 21 September, and steamed to Ulithi to form an important task group for operations in the western Pacific. The giant force, numbering 17 carriers and supporting surface ships, rendezvoused at sea, and launched strikes against Okinawa on 10 October. Then on 12 October, the carriers moved toward their real objective—Formosa. In a devastating 3 days of air attacks, carrier planes did much to destroy Formosa as a supporting base for the Japanese in the island battles to come. Japanese forces retaliated with heavy and repeated land-based air attacks. Healy brought down one bomber and assisted in downing many more during these attacks, in which Canberra and Houston were damaged.

After protecting the retirement of the damaged ships ("CripDiv 1"), Healy resumed her screening duties for air attacks against Philippine installations 19 October. As troops stormed ashore at Leyte for the historic return to the Philippines, Healy and her carrier group began direct support of the operation, blasting airfields on southern Luzon.

By 24 October, it was clear that the invasion of Leyte had called forth one last giant effort on the part of the Japanese to annihilate the American fleet. Its three major fleet units moved toward the Philippines for the historic Battle for Leyte Gulf, intending to divert Admiral William F. Halsey's carriers to the northward and strike the assault forces in the gulf a two-pronged death blow. Healy joined Rear Admiral Frederick C. Sherman's Task Group 38.3 (TG 38.3), near Luzon 24 October which was attacked early in the day by land-based aircraft. Planes of the task group struck out at the ships of Vice Admiral Takeo Kurita in the Sibuyan Sea, sinking Musashi and damaging other heavy units of the Japanese forces.

While two other phases of the great engagement, the Battle of Surigao Strait and the Battle off Samar, were being fought, Admiral Halsey deployed carrier forces northward to meet the decoy force of carriers under Admiral Jisaburo Ozawa. Making contact on 25 October, the carriers, screened by Healy and other surface units, launched a series of strikes at the Japanese carrier group. Despite effective enemy anti-aircraft fire, the planes succeeded in sinking four carriers, and a damaged destroyer was later sunk by gunfire. The great sea battle was thus ended, with the invasion of Leyte secured and the Japanese fleet no longer an effective fighting unit.

Healy returned to Ulithi for replenishment on 30 October and sailed two days later with her task group for additional strikes on the Philippines. Strikes on 5 November crippled airfields on Luzon, hit shipping in Manila Bay, and fought off air attacks by Japanese planes against the fleet. These operations continued until 2 December, with Healy splashing several of the attacking aircraft in the protection of her carriers. After a brief stay at Ulithi, the destroyer and her task group returned to Luzon for strikes against airfields from 14 to 16 December. After riding out the terrible typhoon which sank Hull, Monaghan, and Spence, Healy searched for survivors from the lost ships before returning to Ulithi with her carrier group 24 December.

==== 1945 ====
After getting underway 30 December, Healy and her task group moved back to the Philippines. They attacked Formosa and Luzon until 8 January 1945, and then pushed into the South China Sea for a bold demonstration of the mobility of carrier-based air power. Attacking Formosa, Camranh Bay, Saigon, Hong Kong, and Hainan, the ships sailed out of the South China Sea 21 January, having sunk over 130,000 tons of shipping and destroyed numerous aircraft.

The carrier forces, after another stop at Ulithi, now turned their attention to Iwo Jima. With Healy and other destroyers in the protective screen, carrier planes supplied close support for the invasion of the island on 19 February, and continued for 3 days before departing for strikes against Japanese home air bases. Leaving the carrier group, Healy next was assigned to the battleships designated to bombard Iwo Jima, and remained off the island patrolling and screening from 4–27 March. She then sailed with Thuban by way of Saipan and Eniwetok to Pearl Harbor, arriving on 4 April 1945. From there the veteran destroyer steamed to San Francisco Bay, where she arrived on 23 April.

After repairs and additional training, Healy again got underway for the combat zone 20 June 1945, departing the Hawaiian area on 2 August with New Jersey and other ships for the western Pacific. The destroyer arrived Guam on 11 August, and en route from there to Iwo Jima heard the news that the war was over. Healy steamed off Japan with Missouri and other units preparatory to the formal surrender, then acted as harbor control vessel at Tokyo Bay until after the ceremonies, departing on 5 September with passengers for the United States. She put them ashore at San Diego, Calif. on 21 December 1945 and sailed from California via the Panama Canal to New York, where she arrived on 17 January 1946. Subsequently, she sailed to Charleston, S.C. and decommissioned on 11 July 1946.

=== 1951-1958 ===
Healy remained in reserve until recommissioning at Charleston 3 August 1951. After shakedown training at Guantanamo Bay, Cuba, the ship took part in training exercises including anti-submarine, air defense, and screening drills until 29 June 1953. During this time she visited various Caribbean ports and convoyed shipping to and from the Panama Canal.

Healy put to sea on 29 June 1953 on a world cruise, stopping at San Diego and Pearl Harbor on the way to the Far East. The destroyer participated in operations with the 7th Fleet patrolling off Communist China, and conducted coastal patrol off Korea from 3 August to 3 December 1953. Rejoining her division, she then resumed her world cruise, visiting Hong Kong, Ceylon, Egypt, Italy, and other countries before returning to Norfolk on 6 February 1954. The ship spent the remainder of 1954 on a midshipman training cruise to northern Europe and on local exercises off Virginia.

The destroyer joined the 6th Fleet in 1955, sailing on 5 November for the Mediterranean. She remained with the fleet protecting allied interests in that area until 26 February 1956, when she returned to Norfolk. After another cruise training midshipmen, which took her to northern Europe again, the ship returned to Annapolis on 31 July 1956. Healy then participated in local operations, spent a month as training ship for Naval Mine Warfare School, Yorktown, Va., and arrived Norfolk on 19 March 1957. Moving to Philadelphia, the ship decommissioned on 11 March 1958.

Healy was stricken from the Naval Vessel Register on 1 December 1974. She was sold on 12 April 1976 and broken up for scrap.

== Awards ==
Healy received eight battle stars for World War II service.

== In popular culture ==
The Healy appeared in the movie "Away All Boats", accurately depicting the Fletcher destroyer class's anti-aircraft role in the Pacific Theater.
