= Mary Healy =

Mary Healy may refer to:

- Mary Magdalen Healy (1846–1919), American-Canadian Roman Catholic nun
- Mary Healy (zoologist) (1953–2014), American zoologist, CEO and director of the Sacramento Zoo
- Mary Healy (entertainer) (1918–2015), American actress, singer, and variety entertainer
- Mary Healy (Mother Gertrude) (1865–1952), Australian hospital administrator and member of the Sisters of Charity
- Mary Healy (theologian), Catholic professor and international speaker
