= William Healy (neurologist) =

American English-born psychiatrist

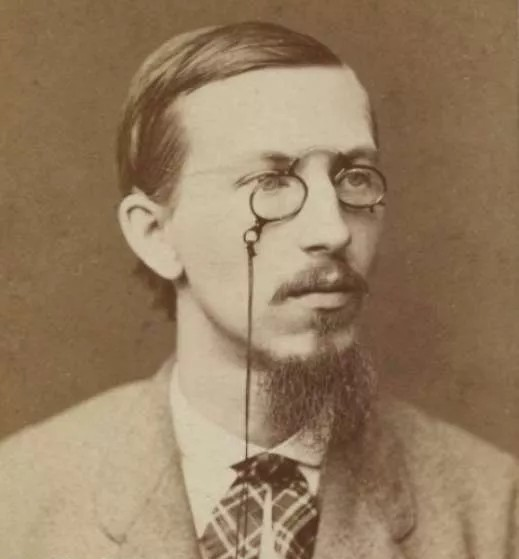
William Healy

William Healy (January 20, 1869 – March 15, 1963) was a British-American psychiatrist and criminologist who started the earliest American child guidance clinic, was a pioneer of psychoanalysis in the United States, and served as the American Orthopsychiatric Association's founding president.

== Early life and education ==
William Healy was born in Buckinghamshire, England on January 20, 1869. He came from a family of farmers who had resided for generations in Farnham Commons of Beaconsfield, twenty-five miles northwest of London. When he was nine, his family immigrated to the United States, settling in Chicago where Healy spent the remainder of his childhood.

At fourteen, before finishing eighth grade, Healy began working as an office boy at a bank. The small bank was somewhat of a "cultural storehouse" with employees that ranged from Shakespearean scholars and poets to musical conductors. Over the next ten years, Healy became head "bookkeeper" before applying to Harvard.

Healy likely received encouragement from William Salter, leader of the Chicago Ethical Cultural Society, Harvard alumnus, and brother-in-law of William James, to apply to Harvard. Healy failed the Latin portion of the Harvard required exams twice but was still awarded a degree and studied at Harvard Medical School for three years before returning to Chicago and completing his degree at the University of Chicago's Rush Medical School specializing in gynecology.

== Career ==
Healy began his career in 1901 as an instructor in gynecology at Northwestern Medical School. During his two-year stint there, he also edited the journal Gynecology and Anatomy and Physiology and Pathology. During this time his interest began to shift toward neurology, and in 1903 he took up a post as instructor of Nervous and Mental Diseases at Chicago Polyclinic. He stayed at this post until 1916, while simultaneously running a private practice in general medicine.

In 1906 and 1907, Healy studied in Vienna, Berlin, and London, and it was during this trip that he was exposed to Freud's Interpretation of Dreams. Healy became very interested in Freud's psychoanalysis while remaining skeptical of Freud's focus on infantile sexuality. He was a significant factor in bringing psychoanalysis to the United States, and published Structure and Meaning of Psychoanalysis in 1931.

At a 1908 meeting at the Hull House, which Healy had been involved with since medical school, he organized a research program with juvenile delinquents in the juvenile court system. Healy traveled the country discussing his ideas, and in 1909 led the formation of the Chicago Juvenile Psychopathic Institute. This was the first child guidance clinic. In 1917, Healy was invited to Boston by Judge Frederick Pickering Cabot and his associates, to head the Judge Baker Foundation, a similar institution for juvenile research. In 1924, Healy aided in founding the American Orthopsychiatric Association; he also served as the president from 1924 to 1926. Until he retired in 1947, Healy continued to conduct research at the Judge Baker Foundation, which became known as the Judge Baker Guidance Center. During this time period, he also taught periodically at Harvard, Boston College, and Yale.

== Contributions ==
Healy considered himself to be a research psychiatrist and therapist rather than a criminologist, but he made major contributions to both fields. He is perhaps best known for his work in juvenile delinquency; particularly for his creation of the first child guidance clinic. His psychiatric aims included hearing the “child’s own story” to create a viewpoint from the child itself rather than other sources. In criminology, he is known for supporting the multifactor theory of crime causation, which began to move the American view on crime away from the traditional European view. His work with juvenile populations led him to identify certain “causes,” as well as major and minor “factors” that appeared to contribute to delinquent behavior. However, his factors have faced criticism from others for not appearing to be truly descriptive of the populations he studied. Even Healy criticized himself for not investigating further the factors he created. He published 14 books and scores of articles that dealt mainly with the problems of juvenile delinquency and childhood behavioral disabilities. His major published work, The Individual Delinquent, detailed the work that he did with juvenile delinquents during his time at the Chicago Juvenile Psychopathic Institute, and is considered to be his best-known work.

== Personal life ==
In 1901, Healey married his first wife Mary Tenney, whom he had met through Hull House circles. They had one son named Kent Tenney Healy. Mary Tenney Healy died in 1932 after a long illness. Later that year, he married American psychologist Augusta Fox Bronner (1881–1966), whom he had first met in 1913. Bronner was his long-term collaborator; they co-wrote multiple publications on juvenile delinquency. Healy died in Clearwater, Florida in 1963.

== Selected publications ==
- The Individual Delinquent (1915)
- Delinquents and Criminals: Their Making and Unmaking (1926), with Augusta Bronner
- New Light on Delinquency (1936), with Augusta Bronner
- Roots of Crime: Psychoanalytic Studies (1936), with Franz Alexander
