= Le Grand Continent =

Journal based in Paris, France

- Format: Online
- Founder(s): Gilles Gressani, Mathéo Malik, Pierre Ramond
- President: Gilles Gressani
- Editor-in-chief: Mathéo Malik
- Founded: 2019; 7 years ago
- Language: French, German, Spanish, Italian, Polish
- City: Paris
- Website: legrandcontinent.eu

Le Grand Continent (French pronunciation: [lə ɡʁɑ̃ kɔ̃tinɑ̃]) is a journal founded in Paris in 2019, devoted to geopolitics, European, legal, intellectual, and artistic issues, with the aim to "build a strategic, political and intellectual debate on a relevant scale."

== Background and activity ==
Le Grand Continent has been published since April 2019 by fr:Groupe d'Etudes Géopolitiques, a think tank founded in 2017 by three students of the École normale supérieure (ENS Ulm): Gilles Gressani, Mathéo Malik and Pierre Ramond.

The journal's articles are written by young researchers and academics, as well as political decision-makers, experts and artists. Contributors have included Pamela Anderson, Laurence Boone, Mireille Delmas-Marty, Carlo Ginzburg, Louise Glück, Henry Kissinger, Pascal Lamy, Antonio Negri, Thomas Piketty, Élisabeth Roudinesco, Olga Tokarczuk, and Mario Vargas Llosa.

Le Grand Continent also organizes a weekly cycle of debates at the école normale supérieure in Paris, as well as a cycle of conferences. A number of these have been published as a book titled Une certaine idée de l'Europe, published by Flammarion in 2019.

Since the beginning of the COVID-19 pandemic in Europe in March 2020, Le Grand Continent has published a "Covid-19 Geopolitical Observatory" with analytical articles on the pandemic's development and implications, as well as regularly updated geographical data visualizations presenting the spread of the pandemic throughout Europe, which have been widely cited in media.
