= Eric Healy =

Australian cricketer

Personal information
- Born: 5 November 1888; Elizabeth Bay, New South Wales
- Died: 9 October 1954 (aged 65); Cottesloe, Western Australia
- Source: Cricinfo, 14 July 2017

Eric Healy (5 November 1888 – 9 October 1954) was an Australian cricketer. He played his only first-class match for Western Australia in 1920/21.
