= Cesare Angelini =

Italian politician (1901–1974)

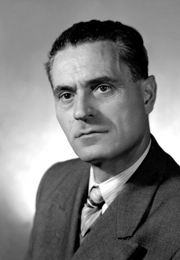
Cesare Angelini

Cesare Angelini (July 4, 1901 – August 4, 1974) was an Italian Christian Democrat politician. He was born in Lucca. He served in the Senate of Italy in Legislature I (1948–1953), Legislature II, Legislature III, Legislature IV, and Legislature V.

== Political Influence ==
As a member of the Christian Democracy party, Angelini was opposed to both fascism and communism. Italian Christian Democratic party election votes were based on a way of life, not just a political party. Also, these Christian ideals were commonly influenced by the ideas of freedom.

During 1953, one such political issue that involved Angelini stood out above the rest. In this instance, Italian "Senators Battled over Communist charges."

This political issue involved Angelini and other Christian Democrats defending their government. At this time, leftists were "exploiting a criminal action for political reasons." Also, there were additional implications relating to Communist party efforts and accusations over the government's supposed involvement with the 'Wilma Montesi death scandal'.
