= Brian Healy =

Brian Healy may refer to:

- Brian Healy (footballer) (born 1968), Scottish footballer
- Brian Healy (architect) (born 1956), American architect, professor, and painter
- Brian Healy (musician), musician in the band Dead Artist Syndrome
