= Alex Healy (racing driver) =

Canadian Touring Car racing driver (born 1989)

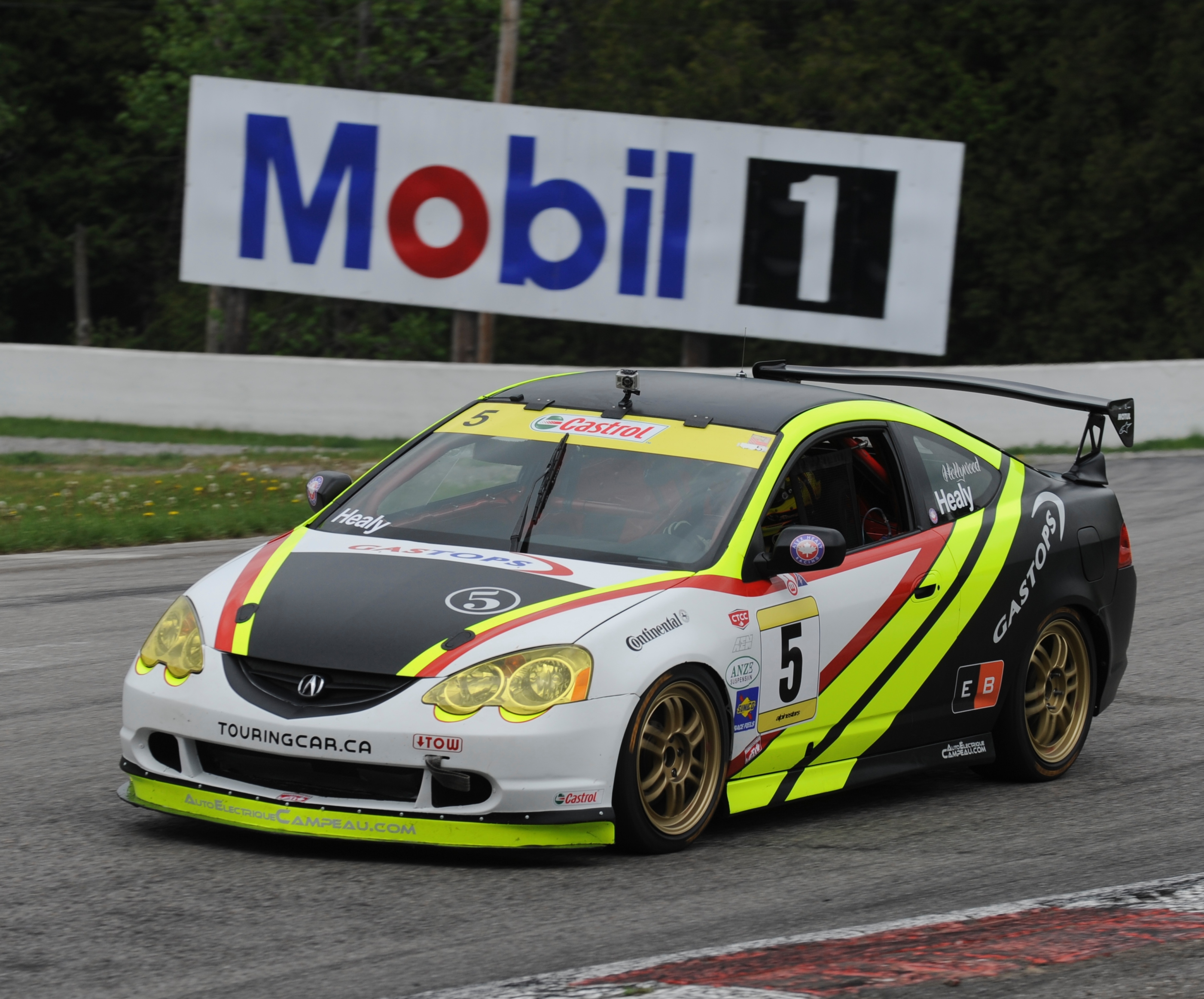
- Alex Healy 5
- Nationality: (Canada) Canadian
- Born: January 15, 1989 (age 37) Ottawa, Ontario, Canada

Canadian Touring Car Championship (CTCC) career
- Debut season: 2009
- Current team: Alex Healy Racing
- Car number: 5
- Former teams: Lombardi Honda Racing
- Starts: 20
- Wins: 0
- Poles: 0
- Best finish: 2nd in 2009, 2011, 2012, 2013

Awards
- Inside Track Magazine Up and Coming Canadian Road Racer of the Year (2009)

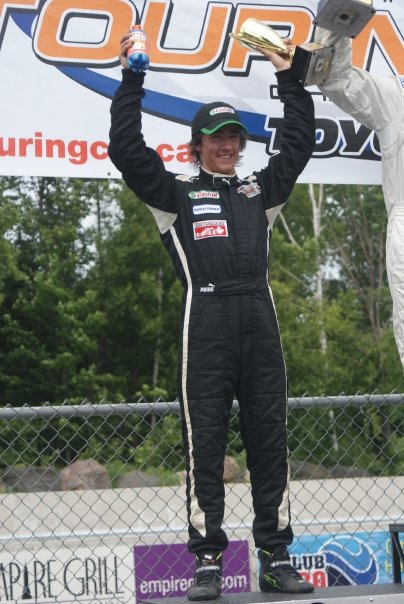
Alex Healy, 2nd place July 26, 2009, Calabogie Motorsports Park

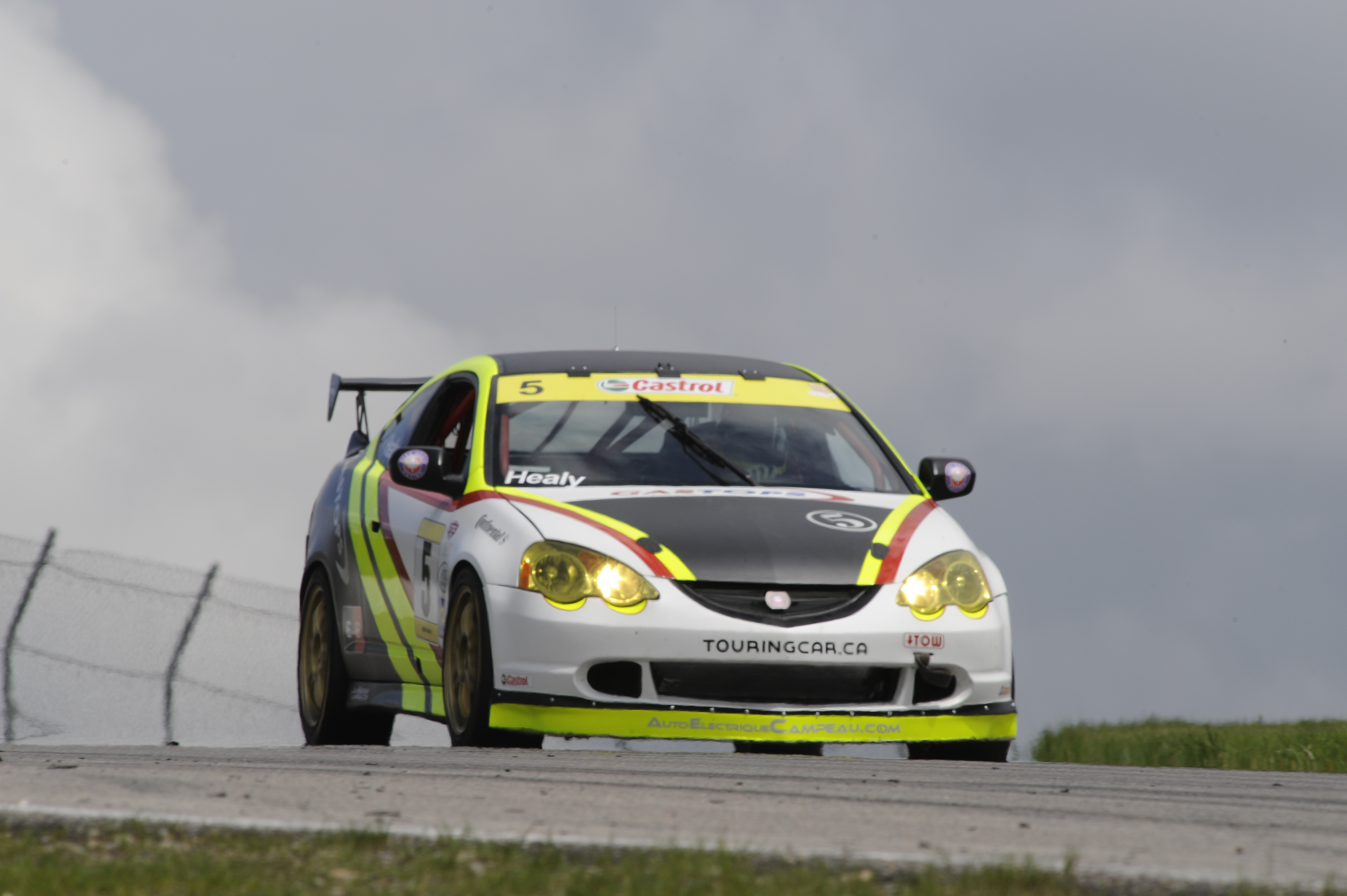
Alex Healy, Acura RSX May 21, 2011 Mosport

Alex Healy (born January 15, 1989) is a Canadian touring car racing driver.

== Career ==
After a successful stint in karting in Ottawa (NCKC), Montreal (SRA) and in the Florida Winter Tour (SRA, 2005–2008) Healy began car racing in the Canadian Touring Car Championship in 2008 in a shared car, a 2003 Honda Civic coupe, in the Touring Car class. At the end of the 2008 season, Healy purchased, with help from family and friends, a much faster 2003 Acura RSX from CTCC Super Touring Champions (2008) Krikorian Motorsports, originally built by King Motorsports as a World Speed Challenge car. In 2009, Healy moved up to the Super Touring Class. He finished the eight-event season in the RSX with two second-place finishes, and earning seventh overall in the Championship.

Inside Track Motorsports News named Alex Healy, as voted by readers in its annual Readers' Choice Awards, as Up and Coming Canadian Road Racer of the Year for 2009.

In 2010, Healy signed with Lombardi Racing of Montreal and raced in the Super Touring class in a four-door Honda SI for the first two events at Mosport finishing seventh in both events. In June 2010, Alex Healy Racing announced that Healy was parting company with Lombardi on a friendly basis to return to compete in his RSX for the remaining 2010 CTCC events.

Healy returned to CTCC series in 2011 in his redesigned and upgraded RSX, and completed six of the seven scheduled events. The RSX encountered many mechanical issues throughout the 2011 season, including two transmissions and an engine failure. This resulted in a high number of DNFs. He finished the series in eighth place overall.

In 2012, Healy appointed a new crew and received increased support from his main sponsor. The RSX had a significant power train upgrade with major improvement to aerodynamics, expecting to see improved handling, performance and reliability. Healy returned to the CTCC series with sufficient funding to compete for the entire season of eight events (16 races).

In 2013, Healy spent the pre-season doing a complete re-build of his RSX- including a new power train and revamped support systems. He completed six of seven race weekends and reached the podium on five of the weekends, resulting in an overall fourth in the CTCC Super Touring championship. 2013 was his most successful season in touring car racing.

In 2014, Healy tested a car for the Porche Cup series and competed in the Canadian National Karting Championships in Mont Tremblant, Quebec. Starting fifth on the grid of the Briggs & Stratton senior class final, he had to settle for a 14th-place finish after being hit from behind early in the race.

In 2015 Healy sold his Acura RSX to an American former pro racer based in Pennsylvania. He is taking a break from competitive racing by competing with the GASTops Chumps for Charity team and doing selected karting events.

In 2015–2019 Alex Healy Racing (Alex Healy, Pierre Clavet, Jean-Mi Isabelle and Tyler Givogue) competed in the annual Pole Position 4-Hour Enduro at Kart-O-Mania in Montreal, winning the event in 2019 and reaching the podium in three previous events.

Healy is the co-founder and president of RH Precision Unmanned, an aerial mapping and surveying, thermographic inspections, and building sciences firm. RH Precision employs drones for engineering projects throughout Ontario and Quebec.

== 2013 CTCC Super Touring results ==
Event	Track	Date	Qualifying	Race 1	Race 2	Report
Canadian Tire Victoria Day Speedfest	Mosport	May 18, 19	15th	11th	6th	Report
Formula One Weekend	Circuit Gilles-Villeneuve	June 7,8,9	7th/3rd	5th	DNF	Report
Circuit ICar	Mirabel	July 6,7	11th/6th	3rd	5th	Report
Circuit Mont Tremblant	Mont Tremblant	July 26, 27, 28	6th	DNF	DNS	Report
Grand Prix de Trois Rivieres	Circuit Trois-Rivières	August 9, 10, 11	4th	3rd	8th	Report
Canadian Tire Mosport Park	Mosport	August 31, Sept 1	5th/5th	4th	2nd	Report
Calabogie Grand Prix	Calabogie	September 7,8	6th	2nd	3rd	Report

== 2012 CTCC Super Touring results ==
Event	Track	Date	Qualifying	Prefinal	Race	Report
Canadian Tire Victoria Day Speedfest	Mosport	May 19, 20	14th	7th	14th	Report
Formula One Weekend	Circuit Gilles-Villeneuve	June 8,9,10	DNS	9th	DNF	Report
Circuit ICar	Mirabel	June 23,24	DNS	DNS	DNS	Report
Circuit Mont Tremblant	Mont Tremblant	July 6, 7, 8	9th	DNS	DNS	Report
Grand Prix of Mosport	Mosport	July 20, 21, 22	DNS	DNS	DNS	Report
3R Grand Prix	Circuit Trois-Rivières	August 3,4,5	DNS	DNS	DNS	Report
Napa Auto Parts – NASCAR	Circuit Gilles Villeneuve	August 16, 17,18	DNS	DNS	DNS	Report
Calabogie Grand Prix	Calabogie	September 1,2	4th	7th	3rd	Report

== 2011 CTCC Super Touring results ==
Event	Track	Date	Qualifying	Prefinal	Race	Report
SpeedFest	Mosport	May 21, 22	6th	DNF	5th	Report
Grand Prix of Mirabel	Circuit ICar – Mirabel	June 3,4,5	7th	DNF	DNF	Report
Vortex Brake Pads 200	Mosport	June 25,26	9th	DNF	6th	Report
Honda Toronto Indy	Honda Indy Toronto	July 8, 9, 10	7th	4th	3rd	Report
Grand Prix of Mosport	Mosport	July 25, 26, 27	7th	7th	5th	Report
Grand Prix de Trois-Rivieres	Circuit Trois-Rivières	August 5, 6, 7	3rd	DNF	DNF	Report
Napa Auto Parts – NASCAR	Circuit Gilles Villeneuve, Montreal	August 18, 19	9th	DNF	no race	Report
Continental Sundown Enduro at ICar	Circuit ICar – Mirabel	September 10, 11, 12				Report

== 2010 CTCC Super Touring results ==
Event	Track	Date	Qualifying	Prefinal	Race	Report
SpeedFest	Mosport	May 22, 23	9th	DNF	7th	Report
High Octane 200	Mosport	June 12, 13	7th	8th	7th	Report
Grand Prix Mirabel	Circuit ICar	July 3, 4	DNS	DNS	DNS	Report
Honda Toronto Indy	Honda Indy Toronto	July 16, 17, 18	DNS	DNS	DNS	Report
Grand Prix de Trois Rivieres	Circuit Trois-Rivières	August 13, 14, 15	DNS	DNS	DNS	Report
Grand Prix of Mosport	Mosport	August 27, 28, 29	DNS	DNS	DNS	Report
Sundown Enduro at ICar	Circuit ICar – Mirabel	September 11, 12	DNS	DNS	DNS	Report

== 2009 CTCC Super Touring results ==
Event	Track	Date	Qualifying	Prefinal	Race
SpeedFest	Mosport	May 16, 17	16th	DNF	15th
Shannonville	Shannonville	May 30, 31	DNS	35th	11th
High Octane	Mosport	June 13, 14	16th	11th	5th
GP Mirabel	Mirabel	June 27, 28	13th	DNF	DNS
Honda Toronto Indy	Honda Indy Toronto	July 10, 11	12th	5th	4th
Ted Powell Memorial	Calabogie	July 25, 26	6th	6th	2nd
Grand Prix de Trois Rivieres	Circuit Trois-Rivières	August 14, 15	8th	3rd	2nd
iCar	Mirabel	September 5, 6	6th	7th	6th
