= Leo Healy (footballer) =

Australian rules footballer

Personal information
- Full name: Leo Joseph Healy
- Born: 20 October 1890; Geelong, Victoria
- Died: 19 January 1939 (aged 48); Caulfield, Victoria
- Height: 170 cm (5 ft 7 in)
- Weight: 71 kg (157 lb)
- Position: Wing

Playing career^{1}
Years	Club	Games (Goals)
1911–14, 1919–20	Geelong	75 (23)
- ^{1} Playing statistics correct to the end of 1920.

Leo Joseph Healy (20 October 1890 – 19 January 1939) was an Australian rules footballer who played with Geelong in the Victorian Football League (VFL).
