= Maurice Healy (campaigner) =

British consumer campaigner (1933–2020)

- Born: 27 November 1933
- Died: 3 November 2020 (aged 86)

Maurice Eugene Healy (27 November 1933 - 3 November 2020), was a British consumer campaigner, editor of Which? magazine and later director of the National Consumer Council.

Maurice Eugene Healy was born on 27 November 1933 in Streatham, south London, the son of Emily (nee O’Mahoney), a teacher, and Thomas Healy. He was educated at Downside School, followed by a degree in classics from Peterhouse, Cambridge.

In 1973, he succeeded Eirlys Roberts as editor of Which? magazine, and was later editor-in-chief for all the Which? magazines.

In 1977, Healy joined the National Consumer Council as head of consumer policy, and was its director from 1987 to 1991. After he "retired", Healy served as a consumer representative on various governmental and regulatory bodies, including as chairman of the Patients Association.

In 1958 he married José Dewdney, and they had their three daughters.
