= Frances Healy =

Frances Healy (born 24 August 1970) is an Irish actress, comedian, radio personality, TV presenter and voice-over artist. Her credits include The Serpent's Kiss (1997), The Magdalene Sisters (2002), River City (2006-2008), Taggart (2003), Fair City (2005), Moone Boy (2015), and Lulu and the Electric Dreamboat (2023).

== Education ==
She attended Trinity College Dublin, graduating with a Batchelor in Theatre Studies in 1999.

== Career ==
=== Theatre ===
Theatre performances include The First Cosmonaut with Blue Raincoat Theatre and The Candidate at The Beltable, Limerick; and Bewleys Café Dublin; The Big Beautiful Woman, as part of the Limerick City of Culture 2014; Desert Storm and Misterman at the Royal Scottish Academy of Music, The Birds at The Abbey, Vagina Monologues and Her Big Chance at The Cottiers Theatre Glasgow, and were part of John Breen's play Alone It Stands.

=== Film and television ===
Her first screen appearance was as a nun in the 1997 film The Serpent's Kiss. She played Sister Jude in the Peter Mullen directed Miramax film The Magdalene Sisters (2002), Other film and television credits include playing Niamh in River City (2006-2008), Taggart (2003), Fair City (2005), and Moone Boy (2015).

In 2023, she starred in the Limerick based film Lulu and the Electric Dreamboat (2023), where she plays the protagonist's mother.

Healy is also a voice-over artist doing ad campaigns for TV, film and radio.

=== Comedy ===
She was the winner of the best new comedy act at The Govan Celtic Fringe Festival in 2004 and a semi finalist in Channel 4 "So You Think Your Funny" competition. After winning best new comedy act at Govan Celtic Comedy festival, Frances was a regular on the stand-up circuit for over 8 years. She has appeared in stand up venues all over the UK, including Jongleurs in Glasgow, Edinburgh and London, The Stand Comedy Club in both Glasgow and Edinburgh, Comedy Café, Banana Cabaret and The Comedy Store in London. In 2022, she starred in "Red Army" at the Lime Tree Theatre, Limerick.

=== Business ===
In 2015, she set up a school of acting in Limerick, called "Acting Up in Limerick".

== Filmography ==
Film and Television
Year	Title	Role	Notes
2002	The Magdalene Sisters	Sister Jude	
2003	Taggart	Naomi McKellan	Episode: "Penthouse and Pavement"
2005	Fair City	Clare Whelan	12 episodes
2006-2008	River City	Niamh Corrigan	
2010	Mattie	Sonya	Episode: "1.4"
2015	Moone Boy	Ali	Episode: "3.1 - Where the Streets Do Have Names"
2023	Lulu and the Electric Dreamboat	Ellen McDonagh	film
