= Mary Norris =

Irish Magdelene asylum survivor (1932–2017)

Mary Norris (née Cronin, 1932 – 31 May 2017) was a young woman in Ireland who was sent to a Magdalene asylum, where her name was changed and she was imprisoned until removed by an aunt. Norris spent two years performing hard labor in the Good Shepherd Convent, a Magdalene asylum. Norris later came forward and recounted her experiences of abuse in the asylum and also the St Joseph's Orphanage in Killarney.

== Biography ==
Norris was the eldest of eight children, was born in 1932 in Sneem, South Kerry, Ireland. She was sent to a Magdalene laundry or asylum run by the Good Shepherd Order in Cork, Ireland, in 1949 at the age of 16. She spent two years there. The laundry closed down in 1994.

Norris was removed from her mother at the age of twelve. Norris's father died when she was twelve and her mother then pursued a relationship with a local farmer, which caught the attention of the parish priest. The priest wanted Norris's mother to marry the farmer or end the relationship, "and when neither happened with the alacrity he expected, the children were seized and made wards of the courts." The children were taken to a judge and made wards of court. They were sent to different places run by different Roman Catholic institutions. Norris found herself at St Joseph's Orphanage in Killarney.

At the age of sixteen, Norris was sent to work as a maid, but was returned to the orphanage after she went to a cinema without permission. She was then sent to a laundry in Cork. She reports that the way she was treated at the laundry amounted to slavery, and that the girls and women were forced to work ten hours a day every day except Sunday. She reports also that her name was changed to Myra, as the nuns felt she did not deserve to share her name with the Virgin Mary, and that she was told falsely that her family had abandoned her. She was given the number 30 as an identifier.

When Mary had been in the Magdalene laundry for two years, a concerned aunt in America tracked her down, and removed her from the laundry. (Later Mary petitioned the sisters of the Good Shepherd in Cork to obtain a list of the names of the Magdalenes who had been buried in unmarked graves behind the laundry.) She was reunited with her mother, brothers, and sisters. Eventually she moved to London with her mother. After her mother's death in 1989, Mary returned to Ireland.

Her brothers had been with the Christian Brothers in Tralee—an order that has also, in some cases, been found guilty of abuse. Her brothers were both alcoholics at the time of their deaths. One died as a result of a fire; the other as a result of murder. Her sisters emigrated, and Norris is the sole member of her immediate family to remain in Ireland.

She discussed her experience as an "orphan" in an interview published by the Irish Independent in January 1999. Mary was married twice and had one daughter, also named Mary Patricia Cronin at birth. She was born in London and placed for adoption at infant stage of 6 weeks. However, Mary and her daughter, later known as Susan Ann Davis reunited in 1984 when Susan was living in Scotland. Susan died on 15 July 2016.

Mary Norris died in Knocknagoshel, County Kerry on 31 May 2017.
