= Charles Healy =

American water polo player

Personal information
- Full name: Charles Louis Healy
- National team: USA
- Born: October 4, 1883 Chicago, Illinois, United States
- Died: After 1930
- Spouse: Caroline Anderson Krebs

Sport
- Sport: Swimming, Water polo
- Club: Chicago Athletic Association (CAA)
- Coached by: Alex Meffert (CAA)
Medal record
Representing the United States
Olympic Games
Silver medal – second place	1904 St. Louis	Team competition

Charles Louis Healy (born October 4, 1883, date of death unknown) was an American water polo player who competed in the 1904 Summer Olympics, where he won a silver medal as a member of Chicago Athletic Association water polo team.

Healey was born in Chicago, Illinois on October 4, 1883. He attended De La Salle Technical Institute, graduating in 1901. Though he ran track in his youth, he focused more on aquatics, competing in swimming, diving and water polo for the Chicago Athletic Association. While competing in swimming with the Chicago Athletic Association, Healy was instructed and coached by Alex Meffert in April, 1909 in a meet with the Missouri Athletic Club.

== 1904 Olympics ==
The 1904 St. Louis water polo contest was held at the 1904 St. Louis World's Fair on September 5–6, at the Life Saving Exhibition Lake. In Olympic competition, America's Missouri Athletic Club water polo team placed third, receiving the bronze, to the gold medal-winning team from America's New York Athletic Club, and the second place silver medal team from Healy's Chicago Athletic Association, also an American team. In the Water Polo semi-final round, the New York Athletic Club team soundly defeated the Missouri Athletic Club team by a score of 5–0 on September 5. Only the three American teams competed. In the final round, the New York Athletic Club defeated the Chicago Athletic Association Club in Chicago Club's only match by a score of 6–0 on September 6.

As Charles Louis Healy, he married Caroline Anderson Krebs on October 30, 1907, at Ambrose Church on 47th Street in Chicago.

Healy continued to compete in swimming through 1913.
