= Leo H. Healy =

American judge

Leo H. Healy

Leo H. Healy (July 4, 1894 – December 1962) was an American judge. He was the Assistant District Attorney and a Judge in New York City in the 1920s. In 1911, he held the title of "World Champion Intercollegiate Orator". He was an attorney for the Black Star Line and in 1923 he was a key government witness in the trial of Marcus Garvey. In 1944 he was the defense attorney for the Christian Front, an antisemitic and pro-Nazi organization active in the United States from about 1938 until about 1942.

== Biography ==
Leo Harold Healy was born July 4, 1894, in Worcester, Massachusetts. He was the son of Jeremiah Healy and Nellie Higgins. He married Anna Gladys Cummings on March 13, 1921, in Church of the Holy Cross, Brooklyn, New York.

On May 10, 1911, in Boston's Faneuil Hall, he defeated Carl Guggenheim of Germany for the World Intercollegiate Oration Championship. Healy graduated from the College of the Holy Cross in 1915 and in 1916 he graduated from the Fordham University School of Law and was the valedictorian. He actively campaigned for President Woodrow Wilson and managed the campaign for William F. Haggerty for the New York Supreme Court.

As a young attorney, he represented the controversial Black Star Line and later in 1923 he was a key government witness in the mail fraud trial of Black Star Line president, Marcus Garvey. In 1922 he was appointed by Charles Dodd as the youngest assistant district attorney in Brooklyn, New York. In 1927 he was appointed by Mayor Jimmy Walker as a Judge of the Brooklyn Homicide Court.

In 1930 he was cleared of charges of "job buying" and in 1931 he resigned from the bench for health reasons. The rest of his career he was a prominent New York City defense attorney.

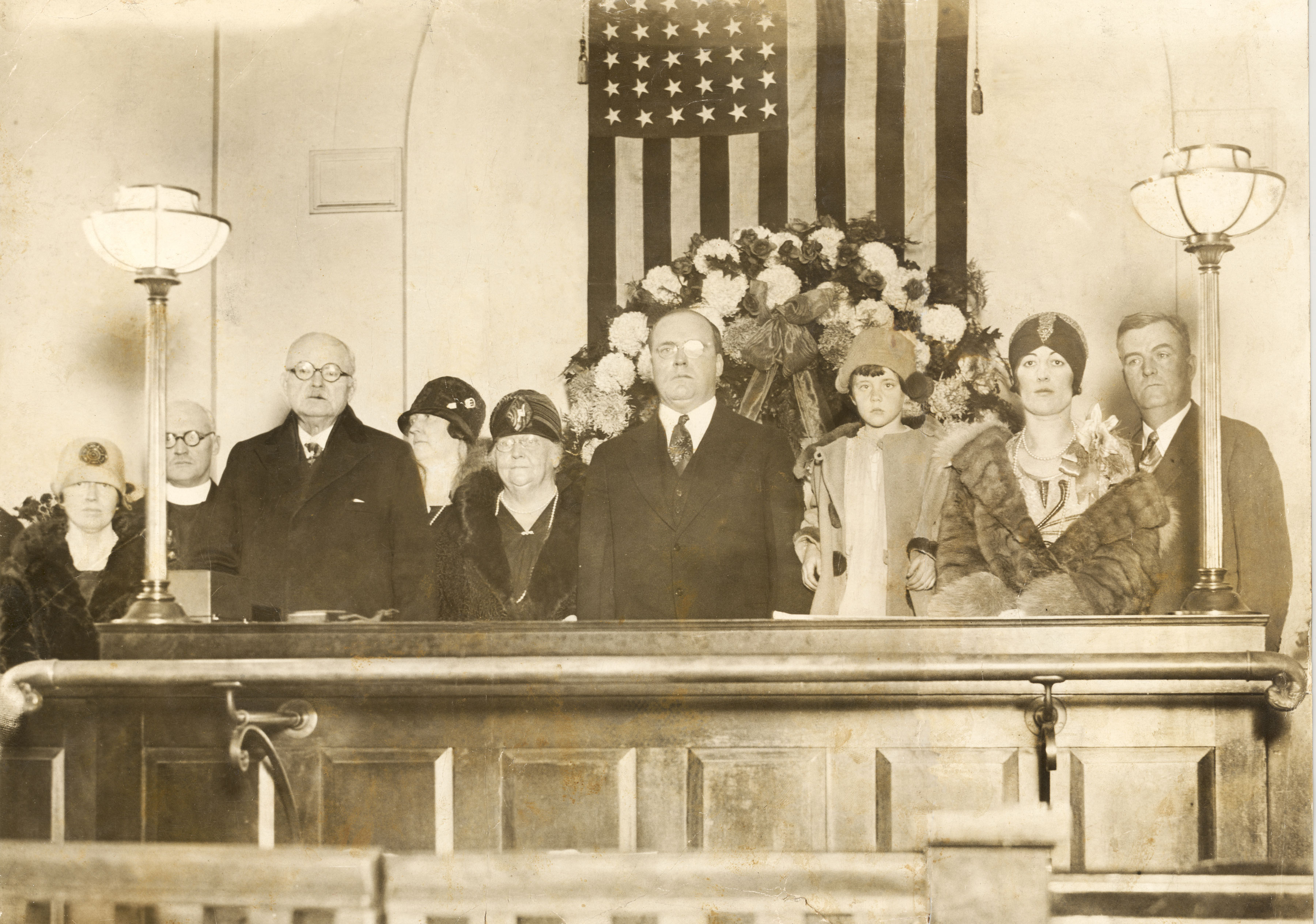
Leo H. Healy installed on the Brooklyn Homicide Court surrounded by his family
