= Terry Healy (footballer) =

Australian rules footballer

Personal information
- Full name: John Terrence Healy
- Born: 2 July 1921; Coburg, Victoria
- Died: 30 April 2009 (aged 87)
- Height: 175 cm (5 ft 9 in)
- Weight: 76 kg (168 lb)

Playing career^{1}
Years	Club	Games (Goals)
1944–45	Essendon	15 (1)
- ^{1} Playing statistics correct to the end of 1945.

John Terrence Healy (2 July 1921 – 30 April 2009) was an Australian rules footballer who played with Essendon in the Victorian Football League (VFL).
