= 2022 Florida House of Representatives election =

2022 Florida House of Representatives elections
- November 8, 2022

All 120 seats in the Florida House of Representatives 61 seats needed for a majority
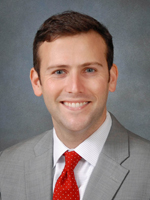

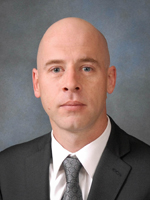
	Majority party	Minority party
Leader	Chris Sprowls (term-limited)	Evan Jenne (term-limited)
Party	Republican	Democratic
Leader since	November 16, 2020	January 11, 2022
Leader's seat	65th — Palm Harbor	99th — Dania Beach
Last election	78 seats, 57.0%	42 seats, 42.6%
Seats won	85	35
Seat change	▲7	▼7
Popular vote	2,824,685	1,870,647
Percentage	59.36%	39.31%
Swing	▲2.39%	▼3.3%
- Republican gain Democratic hold Republican hold 50–60% 60–70% 70–80% >90% 50–60% 60–70% 70–80% 80–90% >90%
Speaker before election
Chris Sprowls
Republican
Elected Speaker
Paul Renner
Republican

The 2022 Florida House of Representatives elections took place on November 8, 2022, as part of the 2022 United States elections. Florida voters elected state representatives in all 120 of the state's house districts. The 120 State Representatives serve two-year terms in the Florida House of Representatives. A primary election on August 23, 2022, determined which candidates appeared on the November 8 general election ballot.

Following the 2020 state House of Representatives elections, Republicans maintained effective control of the House with a majority of 78 members. Democrats held 42 seats following the 2020 elections. Republicans expanded their House majority to 85, up from 78 in the last election, giving them a supermajority in the House. The concurrently held Senate elections also resulted in a supermajority, giving Republicans supermajority control of the legislature.

== Overview ==
Party	Votes		Seats		
Party	No.	%	No.	+/−	%
Republican Party of Florida	2,824,685	59.36%	85	+7	70.83
Florida Democratic Party	1,870,647	39.31%	35	-7	29.17
Constitution Party of Florida	16,857	0.35%	0	0	0.00
Independent	16,600	0.35%	0	0	0.00
Green Party of Florida	9,202	0.19%	0	0	0.00
Write-in	2,944	0.06%	0	0	0.00
Total	4,758,610	100.00	120	±0	100.00
Registered voters / turnout					
Source: Florida Division of Elections

House seats
Republican	70.83%
Democratic	29.17%

=== Closest races ===
Seats where the margin of victory was under 10%:

1. District 106, 0.46%
2. District 93, 1.3%
3. District 47, 1.88%
4. District 113, 2% gain
5. District 91, 3.48% gain
6. District 37, 3.88% gain
7. District 38, 4.6%
8. District 89, 4.86%
9. District 64, 6.6%
10. District 45, 6.64%
11. District 65, 7.26%
12. District 101, 7.48%
13. District 67, 8.16%
14. District 103, 8.34%
15. District 60, 8.44%
16. District 36, 9.3%
17. District 90, 9.8%

== Predictions ==
Source	Ranking	As of
Sabato's Crystal Ball	Safe R	May 19, 2022

== Results ==
District	Incumbent	Party	Elected	Party
1	Michelle Salzman	Rep	Michelle Salzman	Rep
2	Alex Andrade	Rep	Alex Andrade	Rep
3	Jayer Williamson†	Rep	Joel Rudman	Rep
4	Patt Maney	Rep	Patt Maney	Rep
5			Shane Abbott	Rep
6			Philip Griffitts	Rep
7	Jason Shoaf	Rep	Jason Shoaf	Rep
8	Ramon Alexander†	Dem	Gallop Franklin	Dem
9	Allison Tant	Dem	Allison Tant	Dem
10	Chuck Brannan	Rep	Chuck Brannan	Rep
11	Sam Garrison	Rep	Sam Garrison	Rep
12	Wyman Duggan	Rep	Wyman Duggan	Rep
13	Tracie Davis	Dem	Angela Nixon	Dem
14			Kimberly Daniels	Dem
15			Dean Black	Rep
16	Jason Fischer	Rep	Kiyan Michael	Rep
17			Jessica Baker	Rep
18	Cyndi Stevenson	Rep	Cyndi Stevenson	Rep
19	Paul Renner	Rep	Paul Renner	Rep
20	Bobby Payne	Rep	Bobby Payne	Rep
21	Yvonne Hayes Hinson	Dem	Yvonne Hayes Hinson	Dem
22	Chuck Clemons	Rep	Chuck Clemons	Rep
23	Ralph Massullo	Rep	Ralph Massullo	Rep
24	Joe Harding	Rep	Joe Harding	Rep
25			Taylor Yarkosky	Rep
26	Keith Truenow	Rep	Keith Truenow	Rep
27	Stan McClain	Rep	Stan McClain	Rep
28	Tom Leek	Rep	Tom Leek	Rep
29	Elizabeth Fetterhoff	Rep	Webster Barnaby	Rep
29	Webster Barnaby	Rep	Webster Barnaby	Rep
30	Joy Goff-Marcil†	Dem	Chase Tramont	Rep
31	Tyler Sirois	Rep	Tyler Sirois	Rep
32	Thad Altman	Rep	Thad Altman	Rep
32	Anthony Sabatini†	Rep	Thad Altman	Rep
33	Brett Hage†	Rep	Randy Fine	Rep
33	Randy Fine	Rep	Randy Fine	Rep
34			Robbie Brackett	Rep
35	Fred Hawkins	Rep	Fred Hawkins	Rep
36			Rachel Plakon	Rep
37	Carlos Guillermo Smith	Dem	Susan Plasencia	Rep
38	David Smith	Rep	David Smith	Rep
39			Doug Bankson	Rep
40			LaVon Bracy Davis	Dem
41	Travaris McCurdy	Dem	Bruce Antone	Dem
42	Anna Eskamani	Dem	Anna Eskamani	Dem
43			Johanna López	Dem
44	Daisy Morales	Dem	Rita Harris	Dem
44	Geraldine Thompson†	Dem	Rita Harris	Dem
45			Carolina Amesty	Rep
46	Kristen Arrington	Dem	Kristen Arrington	Dem
47			Paula Stark	Rep
48	Sam Killebrew	Rep	Sam Killebrew	Rep
49	Melony Bell	Rep	Melony Bell	Rep
50			Jennifer Canady	Rep
51	Josie Tomkow	Rep	Josie Tomkow	Rep
52			John Temple	Rep
53			Jeff Holcomb	Rep
54	Randy Maggard	Rep	Randy Maggard	Rep
55	Ardian Zika†	Rep	Kevin Steele	Rep
56	Amber Mariano†	Rep	Brad Yeager	Rep
57			Adam Anderson	Rep
58	Chris Latvala	Rep	Kim Berfield	Rep
59			Berny Jacques	Rep
60	Jackie Toledo†	Rep	Lindsay Cross	Dem
61	Linda Chaney	Rep	Linda Chaney	Rep
62	Michele Rayner	Dem	Michele Rayner	Dem
63	Dianne Hart	Dem	Dianne Hart	Dem
64	Susan Valdes	Dem	Susan Valdes	Dem
65			Karen Gonzalez Pittman	Rep
66	Traci Koster	Rep	Traci Koster	Rep
67	Fentrice Driskell	Dem	Fentrice Driskell	Dem
68	Lawrence McClure	Rep	Lawrence McClure	Rep
69	Andrew Learned	Dem	Danny Alvarez	Rep
70	Mike Beltran	Rep	Mike Beltran	Rep
71	Will Robinson	Rep	Will Robinson	Rep
72	Tommy Gregory	Rep	Tommy Gregory	Rep
73	Fiona McFarland	Rep	Fiona McFarland	Rep
74	James Buchanan	Rep	James Buchanan	Rep
75	Michael J. Grant	Rep	Michael J. Grant	Rep
76	Spencer Roach	Rep	Spencer Roach	Rep
77	Mike Giallombardo	Rep	Tiffany Esposito	Rep
78	Jenna Persons	Rep	Jenna Persons	Rep
79	Mike Giallombardo	Rep	Mike Giallombardo	Rep
80	Adam Botana	Rep	Adam Botana	Rep
81	Bob Rommel	Rep	Bob Rommel	Rep
82	Lauren Melo	Rep	Lauren Melo	Rep
83	Kaylee Tuck	Rep	Kaylee Tuck	Rep
84	Dana Trabulsy	Rep	Dana Trabulsy	Rep
85	Toby Overdorf	Rep	Toby Overdorf	Rep
86			John Snyder	Rep
87	Mike Caruso	Rep	Mike Caruso	Rep
88	Jervonte Edmonds	Dem	Jervonte Edmonds	Dem
89	David Silvers	Dem	David Silvers	Dem
90	Joseph Casello	Dem	Joseph Casello	Dem
91			Peggy Gossett-Seidman	Rep
92	Kelly Skidmore	Dem	Kelly Skidmore	Dem
93			Katherine Waldron	Dem
94	Rick Roth	Rep	Rick Roth	Rep
95	Christine Hunschofsky	Dem	Christine Hunschofsky	Dem
96	Dan Daley	Dem	Dan Daley	Dem
97			Lisa Dunkley	Dem
98	Patricia Hawkins-Williams	Dem	Patricia Hawkins-Williams	Dem
99	Daryl Campbell	Dem	Daryl Campbell	Dem
100	Chip LaMarca	Rep	Chip LaMarca	Rep
101			Hillary Cassel	Dem
102	Michael Gottlieb	Dem	Michael Gottlieb	Dem
103	Robin Bartleman	Dem	Robin Bartleman	Dem
104	Felicia Robinson	Dem	Felicia Robinson	Dem
105	Marie Woodson	Dem	Marie Woodson	Dem
106			Fabián Basabe	Rep
107	Christopher Benjamin	Dem	Christopher Benjamin	Dem
108	Dotie Joseph	Dem	Dotie Joseph	Dem
109	James Bush	Dem	Ashley Gantt	Dem
110	Tom Fabricio	Rep	Tom Fabricio	Rep
111	David Borrero	Rep	David Borrero	Rep
112	Alex Rizo	Rep	Alex Rizo	Rep
113			Vicki Lopez	Rep
114	Demi Busatta Cabrera	Rep	Demi Busatta Cabrera	Rep
115			Alina Garcia	Rep
116	Daniel Perez	Rep	Daniel Perez	Rep
117	Kevin Chambliss	Dem	Kevin Chambliss	Dem
118	Juan Fernandez-Barquin	Rep	Juan Fernandez-Barquin	Rep
119			Juan Carlos Porras	Rep
120	Jim Mooney	Rep	Jim Mooney	Rep

† - Incumbent not seeking re-election

== Special elections ==
=== District 88 ===
Omari Hardy (incumbent) resigned to run for Congress in Florida's 20th District's special election.

Democratic primary
Party	Candidate	Votes	%
Democratic	Jervonte "Tae" Edmonds	5,318	65.2
Democratic	Clarence Williams	2,833	34.8
Total votes		8,151	100.0

==== General election ====
2022 Florida House of Representatives special election, 88th District
Party	Candidate	Votes	%
Democratic	Jervonte "Tae" Edmonds	11,415	80.0
Republican	Guarina Torres	2,851	20.0
Total votes		14,266	100.0
Democratic hold			

=== District 94 ===
Bobby DuBose (incumbent) resigned to run for Congress in Florida's 20th District's special election.

Universal Primary Contest
Party	Candidate	Votes	%
Democratic	Daryl Campbell	4,816	39.9
Democratic	Josephus Eggelletion	3,511	29.1
Democratic	Elijah Manley	3,032	25.1
Democratic	Rod Kemp	700	5.8
Total votes		12,059	100.0
Democratic hold			

== Detailed results ==
=== District 1 ===
First-term incumbent Republican representative Michelle Salzman had represented Florida House of Representatives 1st District since November 2020.

Republican primary
Party	Candidate	Votes	%
Republican	Michelle Salzman	13,713	65.0
Republican	Mike Hill	7,382	35.0
Total votes		21,095	100.0

2022 Florida House of Representatives election, 1st District
Party	Candidate	Votes	%
Republican	Michelle Salzman (incumbent)	43,026	69.3
Democratic	Franscine Mathis	19,087	30.7
Total votes		62,113	100.0

=== District 2 ===
Second-term incumbent Republican representative Alex Andrade had represented Florida House of Representatives 2nd District since November 2018.

Republican primary
Party	Candidate	Votes	%
Republican	Alex Andrade	14,498	64.6
Republican	Greg Litton	4,628	20.6
Republican	Jordan Kar	3,303	14.7
Total votes		22,429	100.0

2022 Florida House of Representatives election, 2nd District
Party	Candidate	Votes	%
Republican	Alex Andrade (incumbent)	44,459	63.6
Democratic	Carollyn Taylor	25,440	36.4
Total votes		69,899	100.0

=== District 3 ===
Third-term incumbent Republican representative Jayer Williamson had represented Florida House of Representatives 3rd District since November 2016.

Republican primary
Party	Candidate	Votes	%
Republican	Joel Rudman	17,175	61.6
Republican	Mariya Calkins	10,723	38.4
Total votes		27,898	100.0

2022 Florida House of Representatives election, 3rd District
Party	Candidate	Votes	%
Republican	Joel Rudman	'60,263'	'99.7'
Write-in	Sandra Maddox	203	0.3
Total votes		60,466	100.0

=== District 4 ===
First-term incumbent Republican representative Patt Maney had represented Florida House of Representatives 4th District since November 2020. The general election was not held because Maney ran unopposed.

2022 Florida House of Representatives election, 4th District
Party	Candidate	Votes	%
Republican	Patt Maney (incumbent)	Unopposed	
Total votes		N/A	100.0

=== District 5 ===
4th term incumbent Republican representative Brad Drake had represented Florida House of Representatives 5th District since November 2020. Shane Abbott won the Republican primary and ran unopposed in the general election.

=== Republican primary ===
==== Polling ====
Poll source	Date(s) administered	Sample size (Note: Key: A – all adults RV – registered voters LV – likely voters V – unclear)	Margin of error	Shane Abbott	Vance Coley	Clint Pate	Undecided
St. Pete Polls	June 29, 2022	149 (LV)	± 8.0%	26%	6%	15%	53%

Republican Primary
Party	Candidate	Votes	%
Republican	Shane Abbott	24,554	68.3
Republican	Clint Pate	5,787	16.1
Republican	Vance Coley	5,626	15.6
Total votes		35,967	100.0

=== General election ===
2022 Florida House of Representatives election, 5th District
Party	Candidate	Votes	%
Republican	Shane Abbott	Unopposed	
Total votes		N/A	100.0

=== District 6 ===
4th term incumbent Republican representative Jay Trumbull had represented Florida House of Representatives 6th District since November 2014. Griff Griffitts won the Republican nomination and ran unopposed in the general election.

Republican primary
Party	Candidate	Votes	%
Republican	Griff Griffitts	19,444	66.5
Republican	Brian Clowdus	9,790	33.5
Total votes		29,234	100.0

2022 Florida House of Representatives election, 6th District
Party	Candidate	Votes	%
Republican	Griff Griffitts	Unopposed	
Total votes		N/A	100.0

=== District 7 ===
Second-term incumbent Republican representative Jason Shoaf had represented Florida House of Representatives 7th District since November 2018. Shoaf ran unopposed in the Republican primary and the general election.

2022 Florida House of Representatives election, 7th District
Party	Candidate	Votes	%
Republican	Jason Shoaf (incumbent)	Unopposed	
Total votes		N/A	100.0

=== District 8 ===
Third-term incumbent Democratic representative Ramon Alexander had represented Florida House of Representatives 8th District since November 2016.

Democratic primary
Party	Candidate	Votes	%
Democratic	Gallop Franklin	6,652	30.3
Democratic	Gregory James	6,087	27.7
Democratic	Hubert Brown	5,278	24.1
Democratic	Marie Rattigan	2,633	12.0
Democratic	Sharon Lettman-Hicks	1,286	5.9
Total votes		15,849	100.0

2022 Florida House of Representatives election, 8th District
Party	Candidate	Votes	%
Democratic	Gallop Franklin	37,452	71.6
Republican	Curt Bender	14,870	28.4
Total votes		52,322	100.0

=== District 9 ===
First-term incumbent Democratic representative Allison Tant had represented Florida House of Representatives 9th District since November 2020. Tant ran uncontested in the Democratic primary and the general election.

2022 Florida House of Representatives election, 10th District
Party	Candidate	Votes	%
Democratic	Allison Tant (incumbent)	Unopposed	
Total votes		N/A	100.0

=== District 10 ===
Second-term incumbent Republican representative Chuck Brannan had represented Florida House of Representatives 10th District since November 2018. Brannan ran uncontested in the Republican primary and the general election.

2022 Florida House of Representatives election, 10th District
Party	Candidate	Votes	%
Republican	Chuck Brannan (incumbent)	Unopposed	
Total votes		N/A	100.0

=== District 11 ===
Third-term incumbent Republican representative Sam Garrison had represented Florida House of Representatives 11th District since November 2016.

2022 Florida House of Representatives election, 11th District
Party	Candidate	Votes	%
Republican	Sam Garrison (incumbent)	51,146	73.6
Democratic	Cornelius Jones	18,392	26.4
Total votes		69,538	100.0

=== District 12 ===
Third-term incumbent Republican representative Clay Yarborough had represented Florida House of Representatives 12th District since November 2016. Duggan ran unopposed in the Republican primary and the general election.

2022 Florida House of Representatives election, 12th District
Party	Candidate	Votes	%
Republican	Wyman Duggan (incumbent)	Unopposed	
Total votes		N/A	100.0

=== District 13 ===
Third-term incumbent Democratic representative Tracie Davis had represented Florida House of Representatives 13th District since November 2016.

Democratic primary
Party	Candidate	Votes	%
Democratic	Angie Nixon (incumbent)	16,803	88.6
Democratic	Delaine Smith	2,171	11.4
Total votes		18,974	100.0

2022 Florida House of Representatives election, 13th District
Party	Candidate	Votes	%
Democratic	Angie Nixon (incumbent)	34,049	70.8
Independent	LaCiara Masline	14,035	29.2
Total votes		48,094	100.0

=== District 14 ===
First-term incumbent Democratic representative Angie Nixon had represented Florida House of Representatives 15th District since November 2020.

Democratic primary
Party	Candidate	Votes	%
Democratic	Kimberly Daniels	8,498	47.7
Democratic	Garrett Dennis	6,970	33.5
Democratic	Mincy Pollock	2,784	15.6
Democratic	Iris Hinton	552	3.1
Total votes		17,804	100.0

2022 Florida House of Representatives election, 14th District
Party	Candidate	Votes	%
Democratic	Kimberly Daniels	Unopposed	
Total votes		N/A	100.0

=== District 15 ===
Second-term incumbent Republican representative Wyman Duggan had represented Florida House of Representatives 15th District since November 2018.

Republican primary
Party	Candidate	Votes	%
Republican	Dean Black	15,137	63.6
Republican	Emily Nunez	8,656	36.4
Total votes		23,793	100.0

2022 Florida House of Representatives election, 15th District
Party	Candidate	Votes	%
Republican	Dean Black	63,594	98.9
Write-in	Jerry Steckloff	733	1.1
Total votes		64,327	100.0

=== District 16 ===
Third-term incumbent Republican representative Jason Fischer had represented Florida House of Representatives 16th District since November 2016.

Republican primary
Party	Candidate	Votes	%
Republican	Kiyan Michael	9,965	46.9
Republican	Lake Ray	5,967	28.1
Republican	Chet Stokes	5,300	25.0
Total votes		21,232	100.0

2022 Florida House of Representatives election, 16th District
Party	Candidate	Votes	%
Republican	Kiyan Michael	'52,145'	'99.6'
Write-in	Richard E. Hartley	129	0.2
Write-in	Harley Wayne Moore	61	0.1
Total votes		52,335	100.0

=== District 17 ===
4th term incumbent Republican representative Cyndi Stevenson had represented Florida House of Representatives 16th District since 2015.

Republican primary
Party	Candidate	Votes	%
Republican	Jessica Baker	9,919	63.9
Republican	Christina Meredith	5,596	26.1
Total votes		15,515	100.0

2022 Florida House of Representatives election, 17th District
Party	Candidate	Votes	%
Republican	Jessica Baker	'37,989'	'61'
Democratic	Michael Anderson	24,303	39
Total votes		62,292	100.0

=== District 18 ===
First-term incumbent Republican representative Sam Garrison had represented Florida House of Representatives 18th District since November 2020. Cyndi Stevenson ran unopposed in the Republican primary and the general election.

2022 Florida House of Representatives election, 18th District
Party	Candidate	Votes	%
Republican	Cyndi Stevenson (incumbent)	Unopposed	
Total votes		N/A	100.0

=== District 19 ===
Third-term incumbent Republican representative Bobby Payne had represented Florida House of Representatives 19th District since November 2016.

2022 Florida House of Representatives election, 19th District
Party	Candidate	Votes	%
Republican	Paul Renner (incumbent)	56,200	64
Democratic	Adam Morley	31,578	36
Total votes		87,778	100.0

=== District 20 ===
2022 Florida House of Representatives election, 20th District, Universal Primary Contest
Party	Candidate	Votes	%
Republican	Bobby Payne (incumbent)	24,975	77.2
Republican	Luis Miguel	7,393	22.8
Total votes		32,368	100.0

2022 Florida's 21st State House District election
- November 8, 2022
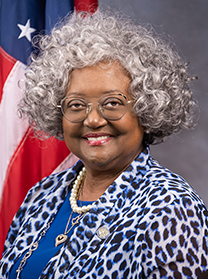

Nominee	Yvonne Hayes Hinson	Hollye Merton
Party	Democratic	Republican
Popular vote	27,615	18,252
Percentage	60.2%	39.8%
- Precinct results Hinson: 50–60% 60–70% 70–80% 80–90% >90% Merton: 50–60% 60–70% 70–80% 80–90% No votes
Florida Representative before election
Yvonne Hayes Hinson
Democratic
Elected Florida Representative
Yvonne Hayes Hinson
Democratic

=== District 21 ===
Incumbent Democrat Yvonne Hayes Hinson won her seat in 2020, running unopposed. While Hinson represented Florida's 20th House District, she won re-election in 2022 in Florida's 21st State House District with 60.2%, defeating Republican Hollye Merton.

2022 Florida House of Representatives election, 21st District
Party	Candidate	Votes	%
Democratic	Yvonne Hayes Hinson (incumbent)	27,615	60.2
Republican	Hollye Merton	18,252	39.8
Total votes		45,867	100.0

=== District 22 ===
2022 Florida's 22nd State House District election
- November 8, 2022
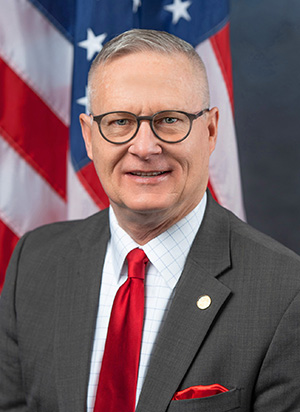

Nominee	Chuck Clemons	Brandon Peters
Party	Republican	Democratic
Popular vote	41,662	32,609
Percentage	56.1%	43.9%
- Precinct results Clemons: 50–60% 60–70% 70–80% 80–90% >90% Peters: 50–60% 60–70% 70–80% 80–90%
State representative before election
Chuck Clemons
Republican
Elected state representative
Chuck Clemons
Republican

Republican incumbent Chuck Clemons was first elected in 2016.

==== Democratic primary ====
Democratic Primary
Party	Candidate	Votes	%
Democratic	Brandon Peters	8,790	51.6
Democratic	Olysha Magruder	8,234	48.4
Total votes		17,024	100

==== Republican primary ====
Republican Primary
Party	Candidate	Votes	%
Republican	Chuck Clemons (incumbent)	11,057	71.6
Republican	Ty Appiah	4,375	28.4
Total votes		15,432	100

==== General election ====
2022 Florida House of Representatives election, 22nd District
Party	Candidate	Votes	%
Republican	Chuck Clemons (incumbent)	41,662	56.1
Democratic	Brandon Peters	32,609	43.9
Total votes		74,271	100.0

=== District 23 ===
Third-term incumbent Republican representative Stan McClain had represented Florida House of Representatives 23rd District since November 2016.

Republican primary
Party	Candidate	Votes	%
Republican	Ralph Massullo (incumbent)	22,811	57.8
Republican	Tod Cloud	9,953	25.2
Republican	Paul John Reinhardt	6,688	17.0
Total votes		39,452	100.0

2022 Florida House of Representatives election, 23rd District
Party	Candidate	Votes	%
Republican	Ralph Massullo (incumbent)	Unopposed	
Total votes		N/A	100.0

=== District 24 ===
4th term incumbent Republican representative Paul Renner had represented Florida House of Representatives 24th District since 2015. Timothy Sharp ran for election.

2022 Florida House of Representatives election, 24th District
Party	Candidate	Votes	%
Republican	Joe Harding (incumbent)	Unopposed	
Total votes		N/A	100.0

=== District 25 ===
Third-term incumbent Republican representative Tom Leek had represented Florida House of Representatives 25th District since November 2016.

Republican primary
Party	Candidate	Votes	%
Republican	Taylor Yarkosky	4,955	29.8
Republican	Tom Vail	4,555	27.4
Republican	Matthew Silbernagel	3,858	23.2
Republican	Liz Cornell	3,243	19.5
Total votes		16,611	100.0

2022 Florida House of Representatives election, 25th District
Party	Candidate	Votes	%
Republican	Taylor Yarkosky	46,542	66
Independent	Banks Helfrich	23,969	34
Total votes		70,511	100.0

=== District 26 ===
Second-term incumbent Republican representative Elizabeth Fetterhoff had represented Florida House of Representatives 26th District since November 2018.

2022 Florida House of Representatives election, 26th District
Party	Candidate	Votes	%
Republican	Keith Truenow (incumbent)	48,210	67.7
Democratic	Linda Kero	23,001	32.3
Total votes		71,211	100.0

=== District 27 ===
First-term incumbent Republican representative Webster Barnaby had represented Florida House of Representatives 27th District since November 2020.

2022 Florida House of Representatives election, 27th District
Party	Candidate	Votes	%
Republican	Stan McClain (incumbent)	Unopposed	
Total votes		N/A	100.0

=== District 28 ===
Third-term incumbent Republican representative David Smith had represented Florida House of Representatives 28th District since November 2016. Mark Caruso is running for election.

2022 Florida House of Representatives election, 28th District
Party	Candidate	Votes	%
Republican	Tom Leek (incumbent)	43,349	61.9
Democratic	John Navarra	26,709	38.1
Total votes		70,058	100.0

=== District 29 ===
4th term incumbent Republican representative Scott Plakon had represented Florida House of Representatives 29th District since November 2014.

Republican primary
Party	Candidate	Votes	%
Republican	Webster Barnaby (incumbent)	7,450	50.1
Republican	Elizabeth Fetterhoff (incumbent)	7,420	49.9
Total votes		14,870	100.0

2022 Florida House of Representatives election, 29th District
Party	Candidate	Votes	%
Republican	Webster Barnaby (incumbent)	36,758	59.5
Democratic	Rick Karl	25,008	40.5
Total votes		61,766	100.0

=== District 30 ===
Second-term incumbent Democratic representative Joy Goff-Marcil had represented Florida House of Representatives 30th District since November 2018.

Republican primary
Party	Candidate	Votes	%
Republican	Chase Tramont	16,089	68.7
Republican	Robyn Hattaway	7,337	31.3
Total votes		23,426	100.0

2022 Florida House of Representatives election, 30th District
Party	Candidate	Votes	%
Republican	Chase Tramont	61,612	99.8
Write-in	Vic Baker	125	0.2
Total votes			

=== District 31 ===
First-term incumbent Republican representative Keith Truenow had represented Florida House of Representatives 31st District since November 2020.

2022 Florida House of Representatives election, 31st District
Party	Candidate	Votes	%
Republican	Tyler Sirois (incumbent)	Unopposed	
Total votes		N/A	100.0

=== District 32 ===
2022 Florida House of Representatives election, 32nd District
Party	Candidate	Votes	%
Republican	Thad Altman (incumbent)	Unopposed	
Total votes		N/A	100.0

=== District 33 ===
2022 Florida House of Representatives election, 33rd District
Party	Candidate	Votes	%
Republican	Randy Fine (incumbent)	38,130	55.7
Democratic	Anthony Yantz	30,289	44.3
Total votes		68,419	100.0

=== District 34 ===
Third-term incumbent Republican representative Ralph Massullo had represented Florida House of Representatives 34th District since November 2016.

Republican primary
Party	Candidate	Votes	%
Republican	Robert Brackett	14,375	59.6
Republican	Karen Hiltz	9,742	40.4
Total votes		24,117	100.0

2022 Florida House of Representatives election, 34th District
Party	Candidate	Votes	%
Republican	Robert Brackett	58,545	68.05
Democratic	Karen Greb	27,485	31.95
Total votes		86,030	100.0

=== District 35 ===
4th term incumbent Republican representative Blaise Ingoglia had represented Florida House of Representatives 35th District since November 2014.

Democratic primary
Party	Candidate	Votes	%
Democratic	Rishi Bagga	4,060	38.7
Democratic	Tom Keen	4,003	38.1
Democratic	Tahitiana Munoz-Chaffin	2,432	23.2
Total votes		10,495	100.0

Republican primary
Party	Candidate	Votes	%
Republican	Fred Hawkins (incumbent)	5,733	52.2
Republican	Kenneth Davenport	3,589	32.7
Republican	Dianna Liebnitzky	1,654	15.1
Total votes		10,976	100.0

2022 Florida House of Representatives election, 35th District
Party	Candidate	Votes	%
Republican	Fred Hawkins (incumbent)	32,858	55.4
Democratic	Rishi Bagga	26,447	44.6
Total votes		59,305	100.0

=== District 36 ===
4th term incumbent Republican representative Amber Mariano had represented Florida House of Representatives 36th District since November 2014.

Democratic primary
Party	Candidate	Votes	%
Democratic	Deborah Poulalion	8,159	69.8
Democratic	Rod Joseph	3,533	30.2
Total votes		11,692	100.0

Republican primary
Party	Candidate	Votes	%
Republican	Rachel Plakon	8,801	65.2
Republican	Richard Santos	3,827	28.4
Republican	Angelique Perry	867	6.4
Total votes		13,495	100.0

2022 Florida's 36th State House district debate
No.	Date	Host	Moderator	Link	Republican	Democratic
Key: P Participant A Absent N Not invited I Invited W Withdrawn						
Key: P Participant A Absent N Not invited I Invited W Withdrawn					Rachel Plakon	Deborah Poulalion
1	Sep. 26, 2022	WESH	Greg Fox	YouTube	P	P

2022 Florida House of Representatives election, 36th District
Party	Candidate	Votes	%
Republican	Rachel Plakon	33,934	54.65
Democratic	Deborah Poulalion	28,162	45.35
Total votes		62,096	100.0

=== District 37 ===
Second-term incumbent Republican representative Ardian Zika had represented Florida House of Representatives 37th District since November 2018.

Republican primary
Party	Candidate	Votes	%
Republican	Susan Plasencia	7,352	74.3
Republican	Kris Stark	2,542	25.7
Total votes		9,894	100.0

2022 Florida House of Representatives election, 37th District
Party	Candidate	Votes	%
Republican	Susan Plasencia	27,720	51.9
Democratic	Carlos Guillermo Smith (incumbent)	25,652	48.1
Total votes		53,372	100.0

=== District 38 ===
Second-term incumbent Republican representative Randy Maggard had represented Florida House of Representatives 38th District since 2019.

Democratic primary
Party	Candidate	Votes	%
Democratic	Sarah Henry	6,239	54.8
Democratic	Dominique Douglas	2,977	26.1
Democratic	Ed Measom	2,170	19.1
Total votes		11,386	100.0

Republican primary
Party	Candidate	Votes	%
Republican	David Smith (incumbent)	9,707	71.2
Republican	Drake Wuertz	2,669	19.6
Republican	Patrick Weingart	1,257	9.2
Total votes		13,633	100.0

2022 Florida's 38th State House district debate
No.	Date	Host	Moderator	Link	Republican	Democratic
Key: P Participant A Absent N Not invited I Invited W Withdrawn						
Key: P Participant A Absent N Not invited I Invited W Withdrawn					David Smith	Sarah Henry
1	Oct. 18, 2022	WESH	Greg Fox	YouTube	P	P

2022 Florida House of Representatives election, 38th District
Party	Candidate	Votes	%
Republican	David Smith (incumbent)	34,309	52.3
Democratic	Sarah Henry	31,290	47.7
Total votes		65,599	100.0

=== District 39 ===
Third-term incumbent Republican representative Josie Tomkow had represented Florida House of Representatives 39th District since May 2018.

2022 Florida's 39th State House district debate
No.	Date	Host	Moderator	Link	Republican	Democratic
Key: P Participant A Absent N Not invited I Invited W Withdrawn						
Key: P Participant A Absent N Not invited I Invited W Withdrawn					Doug Bankson	Tiffany Hughes
1	Sep. 26, 2022	WESH	Greg Fox	YouTube	P	P

2022 Florida House of Representatives election, 39th District
Party	Candidate	Votes	%
Republican	Doug Bankson	35,785	55.6
Democratic	Tiffany Hughes	28,538	44.4
Total votes		64,323	100.0

=== District 40 ===
4th term incumbent Republican representative Colleen Burton had represented Florida House of Representatives 40th District since May 2014. Jennifer Canady is running for election.

2022 Florida House of Representatives election, 40th District
Party	Candidate	Votes	%
Democratic	LaVon Bracy Davis	27,920	65
Republican	Nate Robertson	15,040	35
Total votes		42,960	100.0

=== District 41 ===
Democratic primary

2022 Florida House of Representatives election, Democratic Primary, 41st District
Party	Candidate	Votes	%
Democratic	Bruce Antone	2,906	29.4
Democratic	Travaris McCurdy (incumbent)	2,823	28.6
Democratic	Shaniqua Rose	2,119	21.4
Democratic	Pam Powell	2,034	20.6
Total votes		9,882	100

General Election

2022 Florida House of Representatives election, 41st District
Party	Candidate	Votes	%
Democratic	Bruce Antone	20,207	81.45
Green	Robin Harris	4,601	18.55
Total votes		24,808	100.0

=== District 42 ===
2022 Florida's 42nd State House District election
- November 8, 2022
- Turnout: 58.5%
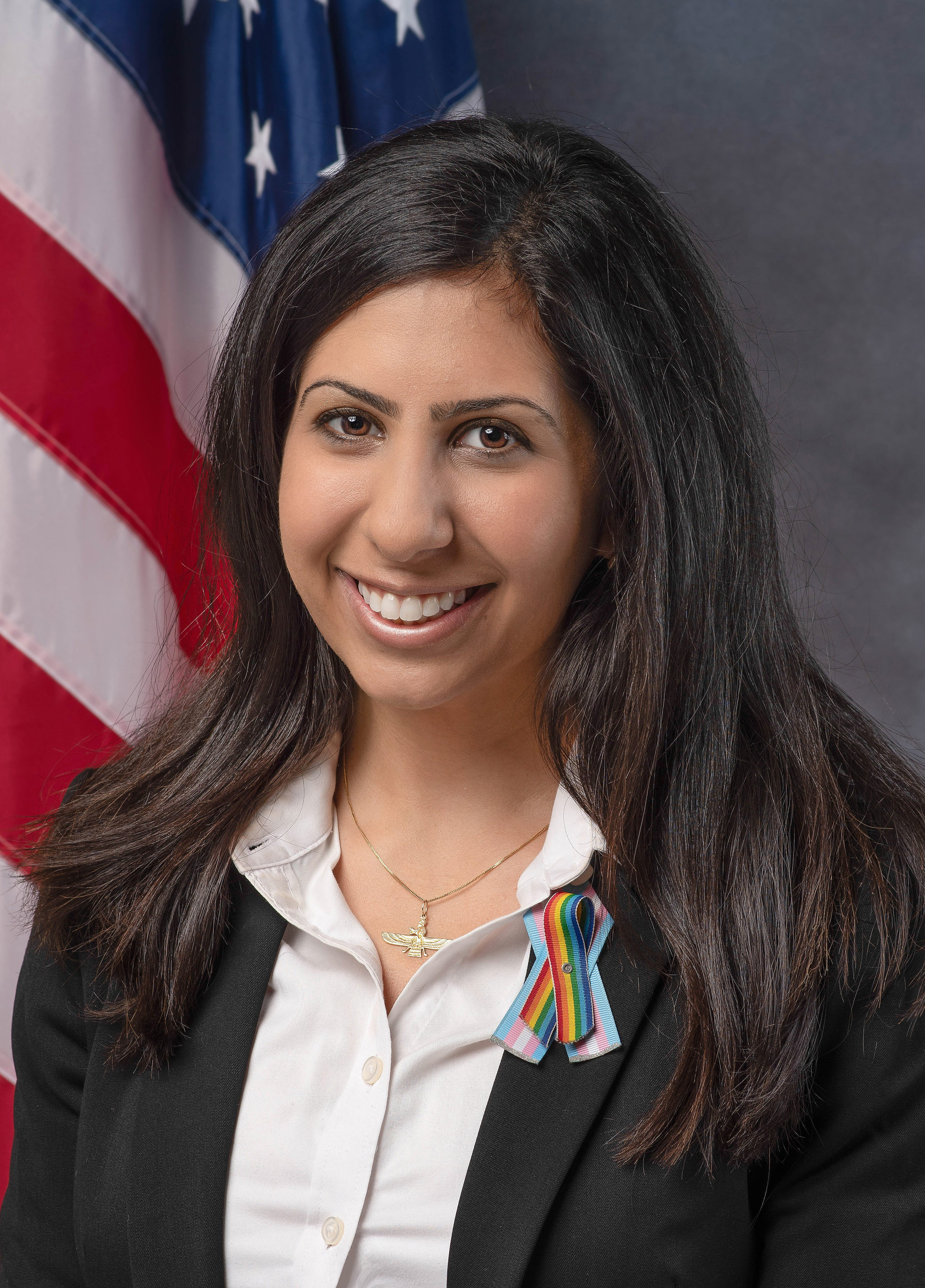

Nominee	Anna V. Eskamani	Bonnie Jackson
Party	Democratic	Republican
Popular vote	43,103	33,014
Percentage	56.6%	43.4%
- Results by precinct Eskamani: 50–60% 60–70% 70–80% 80–90% Jackson: 50–60% 60–70%
State representative before election
Anna V. Eskamani
Democratic
Elected state representative
Anna V. Eskamani
Democratic

Democratic incumbent Anna V. Eskamani was first elected in 2018

2022 Florida House of Representatives election, 42nd District
Party	Candidate	Votes	%
Democratic	Anna V. Eskamani (incumbent)	43,103	56.6
Republican	Bonnie Jackson	33,014	43.4
Total votes		76,117	100.0

=== District 43 ===
First-term incumbent Democratic representative Kristen Arrington had represented Florida House of Representatives 43rd District since November 2020.

2022 Florida House of Representatives election, 43rd District
Party	Candidate	Votes	%
Democratic	Johanna Lopez	22,146	57.4
Republican	Christopher Wright	16,427	42.6
Total votes		38,573	100.0

=== District 44 ===
2022 Florida's 44th State House District, Universal Primary Contest
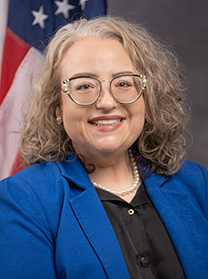

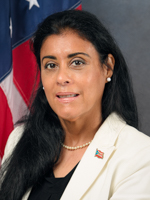
Nominee	Rita Harris	Daisy Morales
Party	Democratic	Democratic
Popular vote	8,348	7,053
Percentage	54.2%	45.8%
State representative before election
New district
Elected state representative
Rita Harris
Democratic

Daisy Morales (incumbent) was defeated by Rita Harris. Harris ran unopposed in the general election.

Democratic primary

Democratic primary results
Party	Candidate	Votes	%
Democratic	Rita Harris	8,348	54.2
Democratic	Daisy Morales (incumbent)	7,053	45.8
Total votes		15,181	100

=== District 45 ===
2022 Florida's 45th State House District election
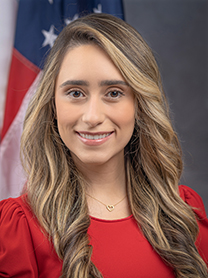

Nominee	Carolina Amesty	Allie Brawsell
Party	Republican	Democratic
Popular vote	35,595	31,160
Percentage	53.3%	46.7%
State representative before election
Geraldine Thompson
Democratic
Elected state representative
Carolina Amesty
Republican

Democratic incumbent Geraldine Thompson retired to run for the state senate.

2022 Florida House of Representatives election, 45th District
Party	Candidate	Votes	%
Republican	Carolina Amesty	35,595	53.3
Democratic	Allie Braswell	31,160	46.7
Total votes		66,755	100.0

=== District 46 ===
First-term incumbent Democratic representative Travaris McCurdy had represented Florida House of Representatives 46th District since November 2020.

2022 Florida House of Representatives election, 46th District
Party	Candidate	Votes	%
Democratic	Kristen Arrington (incumbent)	20,146	58.3
Republican	Christian De La Torre	13,393	38.8
Independent	Ivan Rivera	1,026	3.0
Total votes		34,565	100.0

=== District 47 ===
2022 Florida's 47th State House District election
- Turnout: 40%
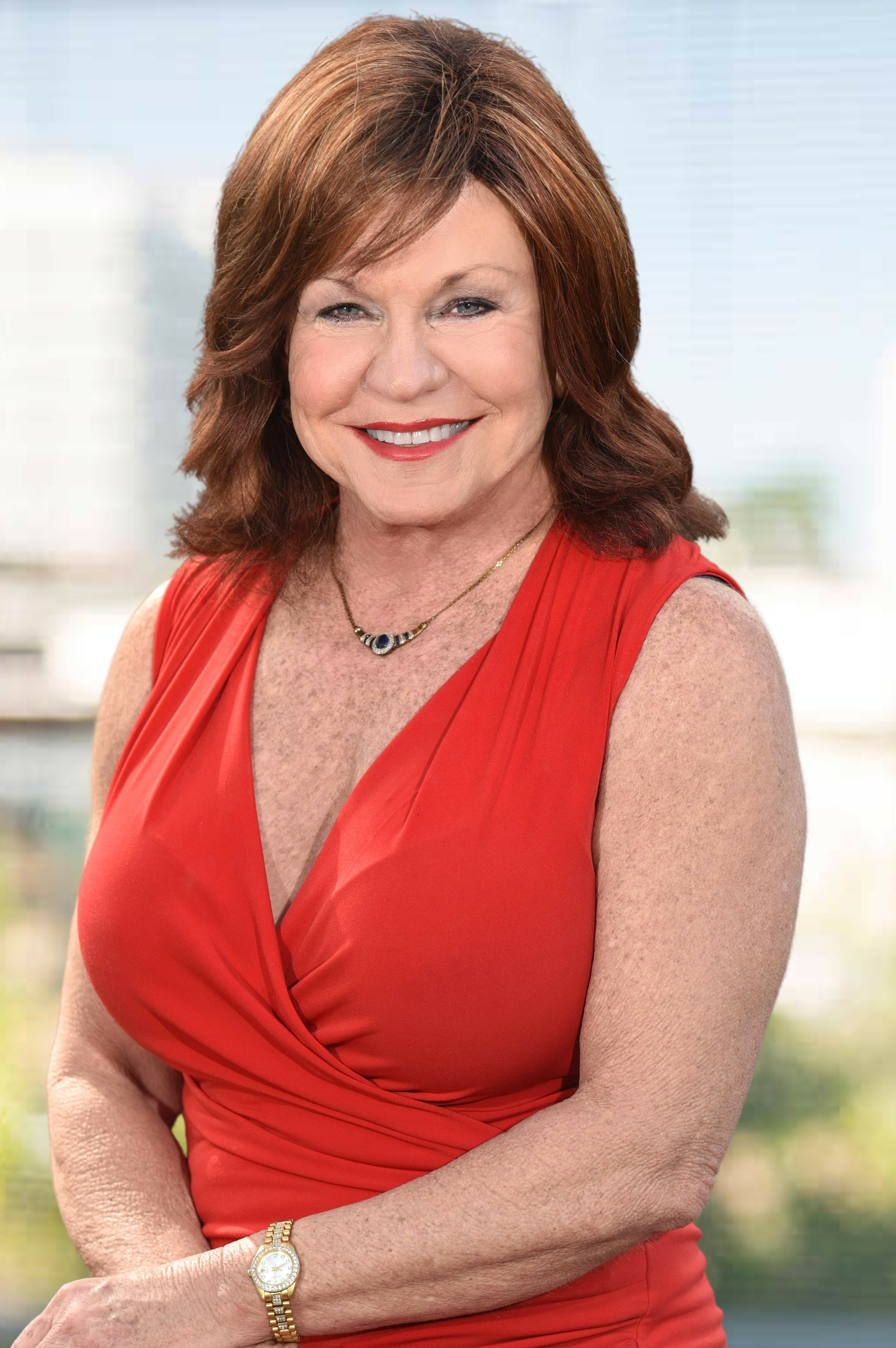

Nominee	Paula Stark	Anthony Nieves
Party	Republican	Democratic
Popular vote	23,825	22,947
Percentage	50.9%	49.1%
State representative before election
New seat
Elected state representative
Paula Stark
Republican

2022 Florida House of Representatives election, 47th District
Party	Candidate	Votes	%
Republican	Paula Stark	23,825	50.9
Democratic	Anthony Nieves	22,947	49.1
Total votes		46,772	100.0

=== District 48 ===
Republican incumbent Sam Killebrew won re-election unopposed.

=== District 49 ===
Republican incumbent Melony Bell won re-election unopposed.

=== District 50 ===
Third-term incumbent Republican representative Rene Plasencia had represented Florida House of Representatives 50th District since November 2016. Tom Keen is running for election.

2022 Florida House of Representatives election, 50th District
Party	Candidate	Votes	%
Republican	Jennifer Canady		
Democratic			
Total votes			

=== District 51 ===
Second-term incumbent Republican representative Tyler Sirois had represented Florida House of Representatives 51st District since November 2018.

2022 Florida House of Representatives election, 51st District
Party	Candidate	Votes	%
Republican	Josie Tomkow (incumbent)		
Democratic			
Total votes			

=== District 52 ===
Third-term incumbent Republican representative Thad Altman had represented Florida House of Representatives 52nd District since November 2016.

2022 Florida House of Representatives election, 52nd District
Party	Candidate	Votes	%
Republican	John Temple	78,601	73
Democratic	Ash Marwah	29,090	27
Total votes		107,691	100.0

=== District 53 ===
Third-term incumbent Republican representative Randy Fine had represented Florida House of Representatives 53rd District since November 2016.

2022 Florida House of Representatives election, 53rd District
Party	Candidate	Votes	%
Republican	Jeff Holcomb	50,650	70
Democratic	Keith Laufenberg	21,636	30
Total votes		72,286	100.0

=== District 54 ===
Third-term incumbent Republican representative Erin Grall had represented Florida House of Representatives 54th District since November 2016.

2022 Florida House of Representatives election, 54th District
Party	Candidate	Votes	%
Republican	Randy Maggard (incumbent)	41,753	61.6
Democratic	Brian Staver	24,472	36.1
Independent	Ryan Otwell	1,539	2.3
Total votes		67,764	100.0

=== District 55 ===
First-term incumbent Republican representative Kaylee Tuck had represented Florida House of Representatives 55th District since November 2020.

2022 Florida House of Representatives election, 55th District
Party	Candidate	Votes	%
Republican	Kevin Steele	58,130	77.52
Constitution	Charles "C.J." Hacker Jr	16,857	22.48
Total votes		74,987	100.0

=== District 56 ===
Second-term incumbent Republican representative Melony Bell had represented Florida House of Representatives 56th District since November 2018.

2022 Florida House of Representatives election, 56th District
Party	Candidate	Votes	%
Republican	Brad Yeager		
Democratic			
Total votes			

=== District 57 ===
Second-term incumbent Republican representative Mike Beltran had represented Florida House of Representatives 57th District since November 2018.

2022 Florida House of Representatives election, 57th District
Party	Candidate	Votes	%
Republican	Adam Anderson		
Democratic			
Total votes			

=== District 58 ===
Third-term incumbent Republican representative Lawrence McClure had represented Florida House of Representatives 58th District since 2017.

2022 Florida House of Representatives election, 58th District
Party	Candidate	Votes	%
Republican	Kimberly Barfield	45,048	60.3
Democratic	Bernard Fensterwald	29,629	39.7
Total votes		74,677	100.0

=== District 59 ===
First-term incumbent Democratic representative Andrew Learned had represented Florida House of Representatives 59th District since November 2020.

2022 Florida House of Representatives election, 59th District
Party	Candidate	Votes	%
Republican	Berny Jacques	42,812	60
Democratic	Dawn Douglas	28,507	40
Total votes		71,319	100.0

=== District 60 ===
Third-term incumbent Republican representative Jackie Toledo had represented Florida House of Representatives 60th District since November 2016.

2022 Florida House of Representatives election, 60th District
Party	Candidate	Votes	%
Democratic	Lindsay Cross	38,707	54.2
Republican	Audrey Henson	32,683	45.8
Total votes		71,390	100.0

=== District 61 ===
Second-term incumbent Democratic representative Dianne Hart had represented Florida House of Representatives 61st District since November 2018.

2022 Florida House of Representatives election, 61st District
Party	Candidate	Votes	%
Republican	Linda Chaney (incumbent)	46,034	56
Democratic	Janet Warwick	36,222	44
Total votes		82,256	100.0

=== District 62 ===
==== Democratic primary ====
2022 Florida House of Representatives Democratic primary election, 62nd district
Party	Candidate	Votes	%
Democratic	Michele Rayner (incumbent)	9,192	53.3
Democratic	Wengay Newton	6,522	37.8
Democratic	Jesse Phillipe	1,537	8.9
Total votes		17,251	100

==== General election ====
2022 Florida House of Representatives election, 62nd District
Party	Candidate	Votes	%
Democratic	Michele Rayner (incumbent)	34,040	69.6
Republican	Jeremy Brown	14,839	30.4
Total votes		48,879	100.0

=== District 63 ===
Second-term incumbent Democratic representative Fentrice Driskell had represented Florida House of Representatives 63rd District since November 2018.

2022 Florida House of Representatives election, 63rd District
Party	Candidate	Votes	%
Democratic	Dianne Hart (incumbent)		
Republican			
Total votes			

=== District 64 ===
First-term incumbent Republican representative Traci Koster had represented Florida House of Representatives 64th District since November 2020.

2022 Florida House of Representatives election, 64th District
Party	Candidate	Votes	%
Democratic	Susan Valdes (incumbent)	22,745	53.3
Republican	Maura Cruz Lanz	19,930	46.7
Total votes		42,675	100.0

=== District 65 ===
First-term incumbent Republican representative Traci Koster had represented Florida House of Representatives 65th District since November 2020.

2022 Florida House of Representatives election, 65th District
Party	Candidate	Votes	%
Republican	Karen Gonzalez Pittman	39,045	53.6
Democratic	Jen McDonald	33,766	46.4
Total votes		72,811	100.0

=== District 66 ===
Second-term incumbent Republican representative Nick DiCeglie had represented Florida House of Representatives 66th District since November 2018. He retired to run for Florida State Senate District 24. Berny Jacques and Alen Tomczak are seeking the Republican nomination.

2022 Florida House of Representatives general election, 66th District
Party	Candidate	Votes	%
Republican	Traci Koster (incumbent)	45,305	60.1
Democratic	David Tillery	30,027	39.9
Total votes		75,332	100.0

=== District 67 ===
2022 Florida House of Representatives election, 67th District
Party	Candidate	Votes	%
Democratic	Fentrice Driskell (incumbent)	25,504	54
Republican	Lisette Bonano	21,707	46
Total votes		47,211	100.0

=== District 68 ===
Third-term incumbent Democratic representative Ben Diamond had represented Florida House of Representatives 68th District since November 2016.

2022 Florida House of Representatives election, 68th District
Party	Candidate	Votes	%
Republican	Lawrence McClure (incumbent)	40,512	68.3
Democratic	Lorissa Wright	18,831	31.7
Total votes		59,343	100.0

=== District 69 ===
2022 Florida House of Representatives election, 69th District
Party	Candidate	Votes	%
Republican	Daniel Alvarez	35,123	56.7
Democratic	Andrew Learned (incumbent)	26,824	43.3
Total votes		61,947	100.0

=== District 70 ===
First-term incumbent Democratic representative Michele Rayner had represented Florida House of Representatives 70th District since November 2020.

2022 Florida House of Representatives election, 70th District
Party	Candidate	Votes	%
Republican	Mike Beltran (incumbent)	48,403	62.9
Democratic	Eleuterio Salazar Jr	28,523	37.1
Total votes		76,926	100.0

=== District 71 ===
Second-term incumbent Republican representative Will Robinson had represented Florida House of Representatives 71st District since November 2018.

2022 Florida House of Representatives election, 71st District
Party	Candidate	Votes	%
Republican	Will Robinson (incumbent)		
Democratic			
Total votes			

=== District 72 ===
First-term incumbent Republican representative Fiona McFarland had represented Florida House of Representatives 72nd District since November 2020.

2022 Florida House of Representatives election, 72nd District
Party	Candidate	Votes	%
Republican	Tommy Gregory (incumbent)	55,933	66.7
Democratic	Robert Dameus	27,881	33.3
Total votes		83,814	100.0

=== District 73 ===
Second-term incumbent Republican representative Tommy Gregory had represented Florida House of Representatives 73rd District since November 2018.

2022 Florida House of Representatives election, 73rd District
Party	Candidate	Votes	%
Republican	Fiona McFarland (incumbent)	51,795	56.3
Democratic	Derek Reich	40,271	43.7
Total votes		92,066	100.0

=== District 74 ===
Second-term incumbent Republican representative James Buchanan had represented Florida House of Representatives 74th District since November 2018.

2022 Florida House of Representatives election, 74th District
Party	Candidate	Votes	%
Republican	James Buchanan (incumbent)		
Democratic			
Total votes			

=== District 75 ===
First-term incumbent Republican representative Michael J. Grant had represented Florida House of Representatives 75th District since November 2020.

2022 Florida House of Representatives election, 75th District
Party	Candidate	Votes	%
Republican	Michael J. Grant (incumbent)		
Democratic			
Total votes			

=== District 76 ===
First-term incumbent Republican representative Adam Botana has represented Florida House of Representatives 76th District since November 2020.

2022 Connecticut State House of Representatives election, 76th District
Party	Candidate	Votes	%
Republican	Spencer Roach (incumbent)		
Democratic			
Total votes			

=== District 77 ===
First-term incumbent Republican representative Mike Giallombardo has represented Florida House of Representatives 77th District since November 2020.

2022 Florida House of Representatives election, 77th District
Party	Candidate	Votes	%
Republican	Tiffany Esposito	31,774	67.4
Democratic	Eric Engelhart	15,388	32.6
Total votes		47,162	100.0

=== District 78 ===
First-term incumbent Republican representative Jenna Persons has represented Florida House of Representatives 78th District since November 2020.

2022 Florida House of Representatives election, 78th District
Party	Candidate	Votes	%
Republican	Jenna Persons (incumbent)	39,416	62.75
Democratic	Howard Sapp	23,401	37.25
Total votes		62,817	100.0

=== District 79 ===
Second-term incumbent Republican representative Spencer Roach has represented Florida House of Representatives 79th District since November 2018.

2022 Florida House of Representatives election, 79th District
Party	Candidate	Votes	%
Republican	Mike Giallombardo (incumbent)		
Democratic			
Total votes			

=== District 80 ===
First-term incumbent Republican representative Lauren Melo has represented Florida House of Representatives 80th District since November 2020.

2022 Florida House of Representatives election, 80th District
Party	Candidate	Votes	%
Republican	Adam Botana (incumbent)	63,708	70.9
Democratic	Mitchel Schlayer	26,185	29.1
Total votes		89,893	100.0

=== District 81 ===
First-term incumbent Democratic representative Kelly Skidmore has represented Florida House of Representatives 81st District since November 2020.

2022 Florida House of Representatives election, 81st District
Party	Candidate	Votes	%
Democratic			
Republican	Bob Rommel (incumbent)		
Total votes			

=== District 82 ===
First-term incumbent Republican representative John Snyder had represented Florida House of Representatives 82nd District since November 2020.

2022 Florida House of Representatives election, 82nd District
Party	Candidate	Votes	%
Republican			
Democratic			
Total votes			

=== District 83 ===
Second-term incumbent Republican representative Toby Overdorf has represented Florida House of Representatives 83rd District since November 2018.

2022 Florida House of Representatives election, 83rd District
Party	Candidate	Votes	%
Republican			
Democratic			
Total votes			

=== District 84 ===
First-term incumbent Republican representative Dana Trabulsy had represented Florida House of Representatives 84th District since November 2020.

2022 Florida House of Representatives election, 84th District
Party	Candidate	Votes	%
Republican	Dana Trabulsy (incumbent)	40,829	61.3
Democratic	Forest Blanton	25,779	38.7
Total votes		66,608	100.0

=== District 85 ===
Third-term incumbent Republican representative Rick Roth has represented Florida House of Representatives 85th District since November 2016.

2022 Florida House of Representatives election, 85th District
Party	Candidate	Votes	%
Republican	Toby Overdorf (incumbent)	44,581	60.85
Democratic	Curtis Tucker	28,677	39.15
Total votes		73,258	100.0

=== District 86 ===
Third-term incumbent Democratic representative Matt Willhite has represented Florida House of Representatives 86th District since November 2016. Seth Densen and Katherine Waldron are seeking the Democratic nomination.

2022 Florida House of Representatives election, 86th District
Party	Candidate	Votes	%
Republican	John Snyder (incumbent)	56,838	68.5
Democratic	Raymond Denzel	26,166	31.5
Total votes		83,004	100.0

=== District 87 ===
Third-term incumbent Democratic representative David Silvers has represented Florida House of Representatives 87th District since November 2016.

2022 Florida House of Representatives election, 87th District
Party	Candidate	Votes	%
Republican	Mike Caruso (incumbent)	44,657	59.3
Democratic	Sienna Osta	30,662	40.7
Total votes		75,319	100.0

=== District 88 ===
First-term incumbent Democratic representative Omari Hardy had represented Florida House of Representatives 88th District since November 2020. He resigned to run in the U.S. House of Representatives District 20th special election. Jervonte Edmonds and Sienna Osta sought the Democratic nomination.

2022 Florida House of Representatives general election, 88th District
Party	Candidate	Votes	%
Democratic	Jervonte Edmonds (incumbent)	26,045	71.2
Republican	Roz Stevens	10,552	28.8
Total votes		36,597	100.0

=== District 89 ===
Second-term incumbent Republican representative Mike Caruso had represented Florida House of Representatives 89th District since November 2018. Lauren Levy ran as the Democratic candidate.

2022 Florida House of Representatives election, 89th District
Party	Candidate	Votes	%
Democratic	David Silvers (incumbent)	17,395	52.4
Republican	Daniel Zapata	15,782	47.6
Total votes		33,177	100.0

=== District 90 ===
Second-term incumbent Democratic representative Joseph Casello had represented Florida House of Representatives 90th District since November 2018. Keith Feit ran as the Republican candidate.

2022 Florida House of Representatives election, 90th District
Party	Candidate	Votes	%
Democratic	Joseph Casello (incumbent)	34,526	54.9
Republican	Keith Feit	28,366	45.1
Total votes		62,892	100.0

=== District 91 ===
Second-term incumbent Democratic representative Emily Slosberg has represented Florida House of Representatives 91st District since November 2018.

2022 Florida House of Representatives election, 91st District
Party	Candidate	Votes	%
Republican	Peggy Gossett-Seidman	38,984	51.7
Democratic	Andy Thomson	36,361	48.3
Total votes		75,345	100.0

=== District 92 ===
Third-term incumbent Democratic representative Patricia Hawkins-Williams has represented Florida House of Representatives 92nd District since November 2016.

2022 Florida House of Representatives election, 92nd District
Party	Candidate	Votes	%
Democratic	Kelly Skidmore (incumbent)	50,343	57.52
Republican	Dorcas Hernandez	37,179	42.48
Total votes		87,522	100.0

=== District 93 ===
Second-term incumbent Republican representative Chip LaMarca has represented Florida House of Representatives 93rd District since November 2018.

2022 Florida House of Representatives election, 93rd District
Party	Candidate	Votes	%
Democratic	Katherine Waldron	33,827	50.65
Republican	Saulis Banionis	32,963	49.35
Total votes		66,790	100.0

=== District 94 ===
4th term incumbent Democratic representative Bobby DuBose had represented Florida House of Representatives 94th District since November 2014. Bobby DuBose was succeeded by Daryl Campbell. Elijah Manley ran as the Democratic candidate.

2022 Florida House of Representatives election, 94th District
Party	Candidate	Votes	%
Republican	Rick Roth (incumbent)	41,220	59.5
Democratic	Terence Davis	28,062	40.5
Total votes		69,282	100.0

=== District 95 ===
Second-term incumbent Democratic representative Anika Omphroy has represented Florida House of Representatives 95th District since November 2018.

2022 Florida House of Representatives election, 95th District
Party	Candidate	Votes	%
Democratic			
Republican			
Total votes			

=== District 96 ===
First-term incumbent Democratic representative Christine Hunschofsky has represented Florida House of Representatives 96th District since November 2020.

2022 Florida House of Representatives election, 96th District
Party	Candidate	Votes	%
Democratic	Dan Daley (incumbent)	33,626	61.15
Republican	Jenna Hague	21,360	38.85
Total votes		54,986	100.0

=== District 97 ===
Second-term incumbent Democratic representative Dan Daley had represented Florida House of Representatives 97th District since 2019. Daniel Foganholi ran as the Republican candidate.

2022 Florida House of Representatives election, 97th District
Party	Candidate	Votes	%
Democratic			
Republican			
Total votes			

=== District 98 ===
Second-term incumbent Democratic representative Christine Hunschofsky has represented Florida House of Representatives 98th District since November 2018.

2022 Florida House of Representatives election, 98th District
Party	Candidate	Votes	%
Democratic			
Republican			
Total votes			

=== District 99 ===
4th term incumbent Democratic representative Anika Omphroy has represented Florida House of Representatives 99th District since November 2014. Hillary Cassel and Jeremy Katzman are seeking the Democratic nomination.

2022 Florida House of Representatives general election, 99th District
Party	Candidate	Votes	%
Democratic			
Republican			
Total votes			

2022 Florida House of Representatives Democratic primary election, 99th District
Party	Candidate	Votes	%
Democratic	Hillary Cassel		
Democratic	Jeremy Katzman		
Total votes			

=== District 100 ===
First-term incumbent Democratic representative Marie Woodson had represented Florida House of Representatives 100th District since November 2020. Todd Delmay, Jordan Leonard, Clay Miller and Gustavo Ortega are seeking the Democratic nomination.

2022 Florida House of Representatives general election, 100th District
Party	Candidate	Votes	%
Republican	Chip LaMarca (incumbent)	42,656	57.13
Democratic	Linda Thompson Gonzalez	32,003	42.87
Total votes		74,659	100.0

=== District 101 ===
First-term incumbent Democratic representative Marie Woodson has represented Florida House of Representatives 101st District since November 2020.

2022 Florida House of Representatives election, 101st District
Party	Candidate	Votes	%
Democratic	Hillary Cassel	24,980	53.7
Republican	Guy Silla	21,507	46.3
Total votes		46,487	100.0

=== District 102 ===
First-term incumbent Democratic representative Felicia Robinson has represented Florida House of Representatives 102nd District since November 2020.

2022 Florida House of Representatives election, 102nd District
Party	Candidate	Votes	%
Democratic			
Republican			
Total votes			

=== District 103 ===
First-term incumbent Republican representative Tom Fabricio has represented Florida House of Representatives 103rd District since November 2020.

2022 Florida House of Representatives election, 103rd District
Party	Candidate	Votes	%
Democratic	Robin Bartleman (incumbent)	34,945	54.2
Republican	George Navarini	29,566	45.9
Total votes		64,511	100.0

=== District 104 ===
First-term incumbent Democratic representative Robin Bartleman has represented Florida House of Representatives 104th District since November 2020.

2022 Florida House of Representatives election, 104th District
Party	Candidate	Votes	%
Democratic			
Republican			
Total votes			

=== District 105 ===
Second-term incumbent Republican representative David Borrero has represented Florida House of Representatives 105th District since November 2018.

2022 Florida House of Representatives election, 105th District
Party	Candidate	Votes	%
Democratic	Marie Woodson (incumbent)	29,745	68.5
Republican	Vincent Parlatore	13,673	31.5
Total votes		43,418	100.0

=== District 106 ===
Third-term incumbent Republican representative Bob Rommel has represented Florida House of Representatives 106th District since November 2016.

2022 Florida House of Representatives election, 106th District
Party	Candidate	Votes	%
Republican	Fabián Basabe	26,414	50.2
Democratic	Jordan Leonard	26,174	49.8
Total votes		52,588	100.0

=== District 107 ===
First-term incumbent Democratic representative Christopher Benjamin has represented Florida House of Representatives 107th District since November 2020.

2022 Florida House of Representatives election, 107th District
Party	Candidate	Votes	%
Democratic			
Republican			
Total votes			

=== District 108 ===
Second-term incumbent Democratic representative Dotie Joseph has represented Florida House of Representatives 108th District since November 2018.

2022 Florida House of Representatives election, 108th District
Party	Candidate	Votes	%
Democratic			
Republican			
Total votes			

=== District 109 ===
James Bush (incumbent) was defeated by Ashley Gantt in the Democratic primary election. Gantt ran unopposed in the general election.

==== Democratic primary ====
Democratic primary results
Party	Candidate	Votes	%
Democratic	Ashley Gantt	7,200	51.6
Democratic	James Bush (incumbent)	6,755	48.4
Total votes		13,955	100

=== District 110 ===
First-term incumbent Republican representative Alex Rizo has represented Florida House of Representatives 110th District since November 2020.

2022 Florida House of Representatives election, 110th District
Party	Candidate	Votes	%
Republican			
Democratic			
Total votes			

=== District 111 ===
First-term incumbent Republican representative Bryan Avila has represented Florida House of Representatives 111th District since November 2020.

2022 Florida House of Representatives election, 111th District
Party	Candidate	Votes	%
Republican			
Democratic			
Total votes			

=== District 112 ===
Third-term incumbent Democratic representative Nicholas Duran has represented Florida House of Representatives 112th District since November 2016.

2022 Florida House of Representatives election, 112th District
Party	Candidate	Votes	%
Democratic			
Republican			
Total votes			

=== District 113 ===
Second-term incumbent Democratic representative Michael Grieco had represented Florida House of Representatives 90th District since November 2018. Keith Feit ran as the Republican candidate.

2022 Florida House of Representatives election, 113th District
Party	Candidate	Votes	%
Republican	Vicki Lopez	21,059	51
Democratic	Alessandro D'Amico	20,234	49
Total votes		41,293	100.0

2022 Florida's 114th State House District election
- November 8, 2022
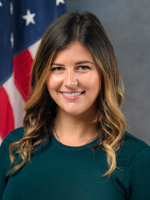

Nominee	Demi Busatta Cabrera	Adam Benna
Party	Republican	Democratic
Popular vote	33,282	25,724
Percentage	56.4%	43.6%
- Precinct results Cabrera: 50–60% 60–70% 70–80% 80–90% >90% Benna: 50–60% 60–70% 70–80% 80–90% >90% Tie: No votes
Florida Representative before election
Demi Busatta Cabrera
Republican
Elected Florida Representative
Demi Busatta Cabrera
Republican

=== District 114 ===
First-term incumbent Republican representative Demi Busatta Cabrera has represented Florida House of Representatives 114th District since November 2020. Busatta Cabrera ran unopposed in the Republican primary, as did her Democratic opponent who she defeated in the general election.

==== Republican primary ====
Republican Primary
Party	Candidate	Votes	%
Republican	Demi Busatta Cabrera	Unopposed	
Total votes		N/A	100.0

==== Democratic primary ====
Democratic Primary
Party	Candidate	Votes	%
Democratic	Adam Benna	Unopposed	
Total votes		N/A	100.0

==== General election ====
2022 Florida House of Representatives election, 114th District
Party	Candidate	Votes	%
Republican	Demi Busatta Cabrera (incumbent)	33,282	56.4
Democratic	Adam Benna	25,724	43.6
Total votes		59,006	100.0

2022 Florida's 115th State House District election
- November 8, 2022
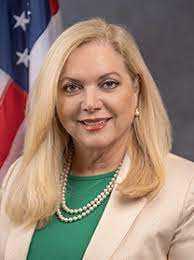

Nominee	Alina Garcia	Christie Davis
Party	Republican	Democratic
Popular vote	40,393	28,696
Percentage	58.5%	41.5%
- Precinct results Garcia: 50–60% 60–70% 70–80% 80–90% >90% Davis: 50–60% 60–70% 80–90% >90% Tie: No votes
Florida Representative before election
Vance Aloupis
Republican
Elected Florida Representative
Alina Garcia
Republican

=== District 115 ===
First-term incumbent Republican representative Vance Aloupis has represented Florida House of Representatives 115th District since November 2020. Both the Democratic and Republican primaries were cancelled because only one candidate filed in each. Republican nominee Alina Garcia defeated her Democratic opponent Christie Davis.

==== Republican primary ====
Republican Primary
Party	Candidate	Votes	%
Republican	Alina Garcia	Unopposed	
Total votes		N/A	100.0

==== Democratic primary ====
Democratic Primary
Party	Candidate	Votes	%
Democratic	Christie Davis	Unopposed	
Total votes		N/A	100.0

==== General election ====
2022 Florida House of Representatives election, 115th District
Party	Candidate	Votes	%
Republican	Alina Garcia	40,393	58.47
Democratic	Christie Davis	28,696	41.53
Total votes		69,089	100.0

2022 Florida's 116th State House District election
- November 8, 2022
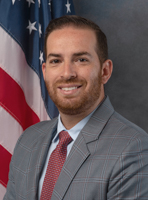
Nominee	Daniel Perez (Uncontested)
Party	Republican
Florida Representative before election
Daniel Perez
Republican
Elected Florida Representative
Daniel Perez
Republican

=== District 116 ===
Second-term incumbent Republican representative Daniel Perez has represented Florida House of Representatives 116th District since November 2018. Perez ran unopposed in the Republican primary, and since no Democratic candidate filed to run in this district, the general election was cancelled with Perez being reelected to a third term.

==== Republican primary ====
Republican Primary
Party	Candidate	Votes	%
Republican	Daniel Perez	Unopposed	
Total votes		N/A	100.0

==== General election ====
2022 Florida House of Representatives election, District 116
Party	Candidate	Votes	%
Republican	Daniel Perez	Unopposed	
Total votes		N/A	100.0

2022 Florida's 117th State House District election
- November 8, 2022
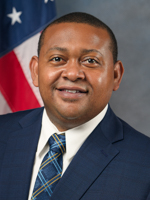
Nominee	Kevin Chambliss (Uncontested)
Party	Democratic
Florida Representative before election
Kevin Chambliss
Democratic
Elected Florida Representative
Kevin Chambliss
Democratic

=== District 117 ===
First-term incumbent Democratic representative Kevin Chambliss had represented Florida House of Representatives 117th District since November 2020. Chambliss ran unopposed in the Democratic primary, and since no Republican had filed to run in this district, the general election was cancelled with Chambliss being reelected to a second term.

==== Democratic primary ====
Democratic Primary
Party	Candidate	Votes	%
Democratic	Kevin Chambliss	Unopposed	
Total votes		N/A	100.0

==== General election ====
2022 Florida House of Representatives election, District 117
Party	Candidate	Votes	%
Democratic	Kevin Chambliss	Unopposed	
Total votes		N/A	100.0

2022 Florida's 118th State House District election
- November 8, 2022
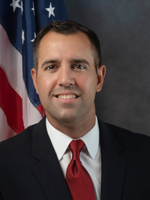

Nominee	Juan Fernandez-Barquin	Johnny Farias
Party	Republican	Democratic
Popular vote	39,344	18,187
Percentage	68.4%	31.6%
- Precinct results Fernandez-Barquin: 50–60% 60–70% 70–80% 80–90% Farias: 50–60% No votes
Florida Representative before election
Anthony Rodriguez
Republican
Elected Florida Representative
Juan Fernandez-Barquin
Republican

=== District 118 ===
Second-term incumbent Republican representative Anthony Rodriguez had represented Florida House of Representatives 118th District since November 2018. Rep. Juan Fernandez-Barquin, previously representing District 119, ran in District 118 due to redistricting. Fernandez-Barquin won the Republican nomination and went on to defeat Democratic nominee Johnny Farias in the general election.

==== Republican primary ====
Republican Primary
Party	Candidate	Votes	%
Republican	Juan Fernandez-Barquin (incumbent)	7,722	65.2%
Republican	Daniel Sotelo	3,215	27.1%
Republican	Francisco Rodriguez	910	7.7%
Total votes		11,847	100.0

==== Democratic primary ====
Democratic Primary
Party	Candidate	Votes	%
Democratic	Johnny Farias	Unopposed	
Total votes		N/A	100.0

==== General election ====
2022 Florida House of Representatives election, 118th District
Party	Candidate	Votes	%
Republican	Juan Fernandez-Barquin (incumbent)	39,344	68.4
Democratic	Johnny Farias	18,187	31.6
Total votes		57,531	100.0

2022 Florida's 119th State House District election
- November 8, 2022
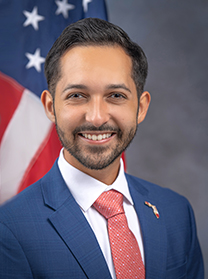

Nominee	Juan Carlos Porras	Gabriel Gonzalez
Party	Republican	Democratic
Popular vote	35,574	19,700
Percentage	64.4%	35.6%
- Precinct results Porras: 50–60% 60–70% 70–80% >90% Tie: No votes
Florida Representative before election
Juan Fernandez-Barquin
Republican
Elected Florida Representative
Juan Carlos Porras
Republican

=== District 119 ===
Second-term incumbent Republican representative Juan Fernandez-Barquin had represented Florida House of Representatives 119th District since November 2018, but ran in the 118th District due to redistricting. Juan Carlos Porras won the Republican nomination and went on to defeat his Democratic opponent Gabriel Gonzalez in the general election.

==== Republican primary ====
Republican Primary
Party	Candidate	Votes	%
Republican	Juan Carlos Porras	4,660	48.2%
Republican	Rob Gonzalez	1,959	20.3%
Republican	Ashley Alvarez	1,461	15.1%
Republican	Ricky Tsay	1,233	12.8%
Republican	Jose Soto	353	3.7%
Total votes		9,666	100.0

==== Democratic primary ====
Democratic Primary
Party	Candidate	Votes	%
Democratic	Gabriel Gonzalez	4,302	55.8%
Democratic	James Cueva	2,449	44.2%
Total votes		5,544	100.0

2022 Florida House of Representatives election, 119th District
Party	Candidate	Votes	%
Republican	Juan Carlos Porras	35,574	64.4
Democratic	Gabriel Gonzalez	19,700	35.6
Total votes		55,274	100.0

2022 Florida's 120th State House District election
- November 8, 2022
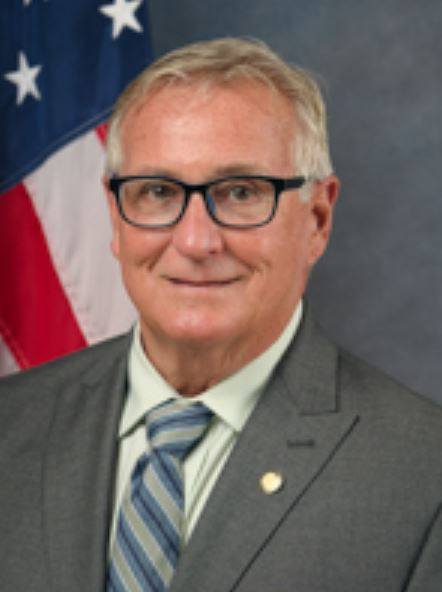

Nominee	Jim Mooney	Adam Gentle
Party	Republican	Democratic
Popular vote	31,788	20,662
Percentage	60.1%	39.4%
- Precinct results Mooney: 50–60% 60–70% 70–80% 80–90% >90% Gentle: 50–60% 60–70% 70–80% Tie: No votes
Florida Representative before election
Jim Mooney
Republican
Elected Florida Representative
Jim Mooney
Republican

=== District 120 ===
First-term incumbent Republican representative Jim Mooney had represented Florida House of Representatives 120th District since November 2020. After narrowly surviving a primary challenge, Rep. Mooney defeated his Democratic opponent Adam Gentle in the general election.

==== Republican primary ====
Republican Primary
Party	Candidate	Votes	%
Republican	Jim Mooney (incumbent)	5,037	45.3%
Republican	Rhonda Lopez	4,947	44.5%
Republican	Robert Scott Allen	1,144	10.3%
Total votes		11,128	100.0

==== Democratic primary ====
Democratic Primary
Party	Candidate	Votes	%
Democratic	Adam Gentle	5,393	55.6%
Democratic	Dan Horton-Diaz	4,302	44.4%
Total votes		9,695	100.0

==== General election ====
2022 Florida House of Representatives election, 120th District
Party	Candidate	Votes	%
Republican	Jim Mooney (incumbent)	31,788	60.6
Democratic	Adam Gentle	20,662	39.4
Total votes		52,450	100.0

== See also ==
- 2022 Florida elections
  - 2022 Florida Senate election
  - 2022 United States House of Representatives elections in Florida
- List of Florida state legislatures
