= Ashley Herrmann =

American politician

- Official portrait, 2026

Member of the Florida House of Representatives from the 69th district
- Incumbent
- Assumed office November 3, 2026
- Preceded by: Danny Alvarez

Personal details
- Born: 1989 or 1990 (age 36–37)
- Party: Democratic
- Other political affiliations: Democratic Socialists of America (Note: The Democratic Socialists of America (DSA) are not a registered political party. Instead, they are a political organization for those with democratic socialist ideologies.)
- Education: Hillsborough Community College (AA); University of South Florida (BA, MA)
- Website: House website Campaign website

Ashley Herrmann (born 1989 or 1990) is an American politician. A member of the Democratic Party and Democratic Socialists of America, she is a member of the Florida House of Representatives for the 69th district since 2026.

Herrmann was elected in the general election on November 3, 2026, defeating incumbent Republican Danny Alvarez. She is also a member of the Democratic Socialists of America (DSA).

After Herrmann was elected, Florida attorney general James Uthmeier filed a subpoena against the DSA, in pursuit of claims that the group had obtained campaign contributions or support from China or Cuba, which are not permitted under state law.

== Career ==
Herrmann was born in 1989 or 1990. In June 2024, Herrmann launched her campaign for the Florida House of Representatives in the 49th district. She lost in the general election to Jennifer Kincart Jonsson.

In 2026, Herrmann ran for state representative again, this time in the 69th district. Her campaign was endorsed by the Democratic Socialists of America. In November 2026, Herrmann defeated incumbent Republican representative Danny Alvarez in an upset, becoming the first socialist elected to Florida's state legislature in over a century.
