= House Bill 999 =

House Bill 999 may refer to one of two pieces of US state legislation dealing with education:

- Florida House Bill 999, a 2023 pending bill aiming to restrict diversity programs in public universities
- Maryland House Bill 999, a 2016 law which opened a commission responsible for playing a key role in the Blueprint for Maryland's Future
