= Senate Bill 266 =

Senate Bill 266, or SB 266, may refer to one of these pieces of legislation

- Comprehensive Counter-Terrorism Act, a bill supported by Joe Biden which would restrict internet encryption
- Florida House Bill 999, pending Florida legislation which has a state senate counterpart designated SB 266
