= Alina Garcia =

American politician

- Garcia in 2025

1st Supervisor of Elections of Miami-Dade County
- Incumbent
- Assumed office January 7, 2025
- Preceded by: Position established

Member of the Florida House of Representatives from the 115th district
- In office November 3, 2022 – November 5, 2024
- Preceded by: Vance Aloupis (redistricting)
- Succeeded by: Omar Blanco

Personal details
- Born: Havana, Cuba
- Party: Republican
- Children: 3
- Education: Miami Dade College
- Occupation: Businesswoman • politician

Alina Garcia is a Cuban American businesswoman, civil servant, and politician serving as the first supervisor of elections of Miami-Dade County since 2025. A member of the Republican Party, she previously served as a member of the Florida House of Representatives from 2022 to 2024.

== Early life and career ==
Garcia was born in Havana, Cuba, and immigrated to the United States. She graduated from Miami-Dade County Public Schools and Miami Dade College.

Alina Garcia has worked in the public sector for over 30 years. She was a Legislative Aide in Tallahassee beginning in 1992. Garcia has worked for Republican leaders such as Jimmy Patronis, Esteban Bovo, the mayor of Hialeah, and many more public servants in Miami-Dade County. When U.S. Senator Marco Rubio was chosen to serve in the Florida House of Representatives in 1999, she was his first legislative assistant.

== Florida House of Representatives ==
In May 2022, Garcia announced her candidacy for the Florida House of Representatives from the 115th District. After winning the Republican primary, she defeated Democratic nominee Christie Davis in the general election with 59% of the vote.

While in office, Garcia voted for Florida House Bill 999.

In February 2024, Garcia announced she would not seek re-election to the state house in the 2024 election.

== Miami-Dade County Supervisor of Elections ==
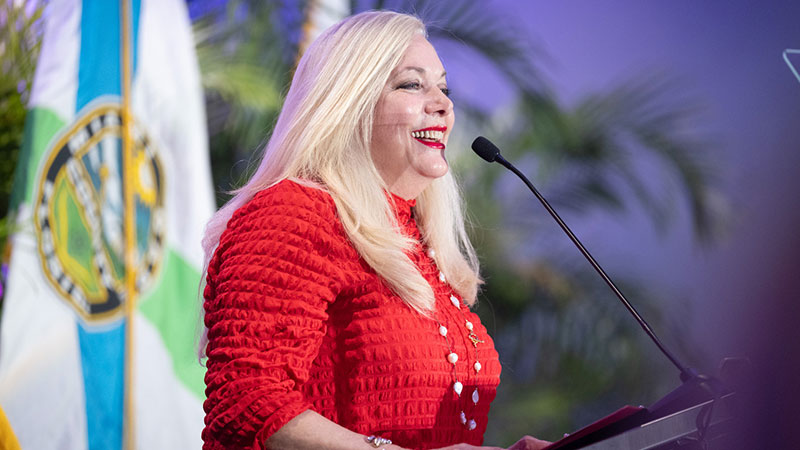
Garcia as supervisor, 2025

For 66 years, the Miami-Dade County supervisor of elections was appointed by the county's mayor. In 2018, a state constitutional amendment was passed that made the position an independent, elected office, along with the roles of Miami-Dade County tax collector, property appraiser, and sheriff.

On February 15, 2024, Garcia announced that she would run for Miami-Dade County supervisor of elections. Her Democratic opponent was former Republican state representative Juan-Carlos Planas. She and Planas had both stated they were committed to a nonpartisan elections department. During her campaign, she was endorsed by President Donald Trump. Garcia ultimately won the race with 55.84% of the vote.

On January 7, 2025, Garcia was sworn into office as the first elected supervisor of elections of Miami-Dade County.

On 17 February 2026, Garcia welcomed Senator Rick Scott to the Miami-Dade Supervisors of Elections Office for a press conference promoting the Safeguard American Voter Eligibility Act. As reported by NBC 6 South Florida, Garcia highlighted Miami-Dade's voter verification processes as a model for other states to follow.

== Personal life ==
Garcia is a Roman Catholic. She is a mother of three and grandmother of 11. Her brother, Monsignor Willie Peña, serves as the pastor of Saint Bernardita in San Juan, Puerto Rico.

== Electoral history ==
Miami-Dade County Supervisor of Elections election, 2024
Party	Candidate	Votes	%
Republican	Alina Garcia	579,770	55.8
Democratic	Juan-Carlos Planas	458,337	44.2
Total votes		1,038,107	100.00

Florida House of Representatives District 115 election, 2022
Party	Candidate	Votes	%
Republican	Alina Garcia	40,393	58.5
Democratic	Christie Davis	28,696	41.5
Total votes		69,089	100.00
