= Jacquelyn Randall =

American politician

Member-elect of the Florida House of Representatives from the 21st district
- Assuming office November 3, 2026
- Succeeding: Yvonne Hayes Hinson

Personal details
- Party: Democratic

Jacquelyn Randall is an American politician. A member of the Democratic Party, she is the member-elect for the 21st district of the Florida House of Representatives. She was previously mayor of Hawthorne, Florida.
