= Sam Killebrew =

American politician

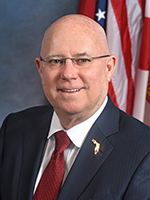

Member of the Florida House of Representatives
- In office November 8, 2016 – November 5, 2024
- Preceded by: John Wood
- Succeeded by: Jon Albert
- Constituency: 41st district (2016–2022); 48th district (2022–2024)

Personal details
- Born: April 13, 1945 (age 81) Lakeland, Florida, U.S.
- Party: Republican

Sam Killebrew (born April 13, 1945) is an American politician who served in the Florida House of Representatives from 2016 to 2024.
