= Anne Gerwig =

American politician (born 1963)

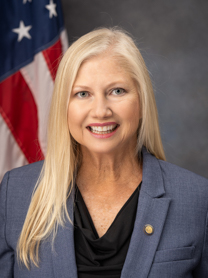

Member of the Florida House of Representatives from the 93rd district
- In office November 5, 2024 – November 3, 2026
- Preceded by: Katherine Waldron
- Succeeded by: August Mangeney

Mayor of Wellington, Florida
- In office 2016–2024

Personal details
- Born: December 4, 1963 (age 62) Warsaw, Indiana, U.S.
- Party: Republican
- Spouse: Alan Gerwig
- Children: 3

Anne Millington Gerwig is an American politician who served as state representative for District 93 in the Florida House of Representatives from 2024 to 2026. She previously served as the 6th mayor of Wellington, Florida.

== Personal life ==
Anne Gerwig is married to Alan Gerwig. The pair has three adult children as well as three grandchildren.

She is currently serving as the Director of Client Communications at her husband's engineering firm, Alan Gerwig and Associates, Inc. She is also an active member of the Wellington Chamber of Commerce.

== Wellington Village Council (2010 – 2024) ==
=== Councilwoman (2010 – 2016) ===
Gerwig was initially elected in 2010.

On August 11, 2015, the Village Council voted 4–1 on an LGBT civil rights ordinance. Councilwoman Gerwig was the sole council member to vote against it. After, she was persuaded to support the ordinance during a later vote. That time, it passed unanimously.

=== Mayor of Wellington (2016 – 2024) ===
One of Anne Gerwig's top priorities as mayor is education. She helped implement a summer internship program for rising seniors to help them become ready for the workforce.

Leading into the 4th of July, 2019, the mayor worked with the Palm Beach County Sheriff's Office on a plan to combat illegal fireworks.

Gerwig was the first Wellington mayor to be re-elected without any opposition.

In 2023, she decided not to seek a third term as mayor. Instead, Gerwig would attempt to run for the Florida legislature.

==== Allegations of Elections Code Violations ====
In May 2017, Mayor Gerwig came under investigation for potentially violating the elections code during her Village Council re-election campaign from 2014. She was accused of 12 counts that ranged from miscalculating her spending by 20 cents to omitting two contributions totaling nearly $1000 from her campaign's financial report. She was cleared of any wrongdoing shortly after.

==== Opposition to Conversion Therapy Ban ====
On June 27, 2017, the Wellington Village Council voted 3–2 to ban conversion therapy on minors. Gerwig was one of the two votes against the measure. When asked about the reason for her vote, Gerwig stated that she believed that minors and their guardians should have self-determination. The mayor argued that banning the practice would take this self-determination away.

==== George Floyd Protests ====
In June 2020, in response to local protests following the murder of George Floyd, Mayor Gerwig posted a statement to Facebook.

The mayor expressed skepticism over the protests: "While I understand the point here, it is not entirely accurate. No peaceful protest was organized by the village or the property owner (the Mall at Wellington Green). It is highly suspect that a group with good intentions would organize a peaceful protest at a retail establishment after the destruction that happened last night, including out own community. Protest by being kind to your neighbor, giving to a food bank, helping those that need it. Gathering during a pandemic which could endanger everyone to protest something that happened very far from here is not helpful at this time."

In response to her statement, a group of protesters gathered outside of the Wellington Village Hall. Gerwig thanked them for turning out and stated that in the post, she was actually referring to a different group of protesters. She later apologized for her comments.

==== Bellissimo Controversy ====
In November 2023, the Wellington Village Council met to vote on a plan presented by equestrian entrepreneur Mark Bellissimo. The entrepreneur called his vision "Wellington 3.0". This plan would remove land from Wellington's equestrian preserve in order to make room to build two luxury communities.

During the first reading of the proposal, Gerwig voted in favor alongside council members Michael Drahos, John McGovern and Tanya Siskind. This move drew criticism from some of the village's residents. The Coalition to Protect Wellington began collecting signatures to recall all four council members who voted in favor of the Bellissimo proposal. Gerwig's term ended before any recall proposals could take effect.

== Political campaigns ==
=== 2024 Florida House Campaign ===
Anne Gerwig filed to run for District 93 in the Florida House of Representatives in the 2024 Election. The seat was occupied by first-term Representative Katherine Waldron, who was running for re-election. In the Republican primary, she faced off against Brandon Cabrera and Chris Mitchell. Within the first 25 days of filing for the seat, Gerwig raised over $80,000, personally contributing $60,000 of that total.

Some of Gerwig's proposals included establishing a Florida insurance bill of rights, the creation of an insurance fraud task force, and making holiday sales taxes permanent.

The race against Waldron came down to a 358-vote margin, close enough to trigger a recount. In the end, Gerwig flipped the seat with 50.19% of the vote.

=== 2026 Florida House Campaign ===
In December 2024, following her 2024 election to the Florida House, Anne Gerwig filed to run for re-election. So far, her only opposition is Democrat August Mangeney, who has raised $36,540 from contributions. Gerwig kicked off her re-election campaign at the Wellington National Golf Club. The race is expected to be closely watched due to Gerwig's 2024 win margin and the anticipation that 2026 will be a blue wave year.

Campaign donors so far include Rick Roth, the Florida Association of Nurse Anesthesiologists, and Florida Surveying and Mapping PAC.

In the general election she was unseated by August Mangeney.

== Florida House of Representatives (2025 – 2026) ==
=== 2025 Florida legislative session ===
Prior to the 2025 Florida legislative session, Gerwig filed a bill regarding school start times. The state legislature previously passed a law in 2023 that mandated an earliest possible start time for schools across the state; under the bill, middle schools could not begin before 8:00 AM and high schools could not begin before 8:30 AM. The new law was set to go into effect on July 1, 2026. Gerwig's bill would repeal these changes. Gerwig's bill passed both chambers of Congress and was signed by Governor Ron DeSantis.

Additionally, Gerwig filed a bill to annually observe Fentanyl Awareness & Education Day on August 21. The bill unanimously passed both chambers of Congress and was later signed by Governor DeSantis.

In October, Gerwig attended a bipartisan community forum addressing housing affordability concerns hosted by the League of Women Voters of Palm Beach County. At the event, Gerwig suggested increasing oversight of insurance mediations and stricter measures against insurers with repeated regulatory violations. State senator Lori Berman also attended the event.

== Awards ==
In 2021, Gerwig received the Global Statesman Award.

In 2022, the Florida League of Cities awarded Gerwig the 2022 Home Rule Hero Award. After receiving the award, Mayor Gerwig stated, "Local self-government is the keystone of American Democracy. I am committed to advocating Home Rule as a way to assert, in law, our community’s mission and vision for the future, and protect our right to maintain our quality of life."

In 2025, the Florida League of Cities awarded Gerwig the 2025 Legislative Appreciation Award.
