= Katherine Waldron =

American politician

Member of the Florida House of Representatives from the 93rd district
- In office November 8, 2022 – November 5, 2024
- Preceded by: Chip LaMarca
- Succeeded by: Anne Gerwig

Personal details
- Party: Democratic

Katherine Waldron is a former American politician who served in the Florida House of Representatives from 2022 to 2024. A Democrat, she represented the 93rd district. She served two terms as Port of Palm Beach commissioner from 2017 to 2022.

== Elections ==
=== 2022 Florida House of Representatives Election ===
In 2022, Katherine Waldron filed to run for the recently redrawn House District 93. She faced off against Seth Densen in the primaries. In the general election, she narrowly beat Saulis Banionis, a pain management doctor, by less than a percentage point.

One of her endorsements for the primary was Mike Caruso, a Republican representative in the Florida House. Caruso said that he endorsed Waldron for their work together in providing hurricane relief to the Bahamas. This endorsement drew criticism from local Republicans, who voted to censure him.

=== 2024 Florida House of Representatives Election ===
Rep. Waldron ran for re-election against Wellington Mayor Anne Gerwig. Waldron ultimately lost to Gerwig, earning 49.81% of the vote to Gerwig's 50.19%.

== Florida House of Representatives ==
=== 2023 Florida Legislative Session ===
Governor DeSantis signed into law Waldron's bill that transferred an environmental preserve and nearby property in Wellington from an independent water control district to a dependent special district.

=== 2023 Florida Special Legislative Session ===
Amidst the ongoing Gaza war in the Gaza Strip, Governor DeSantis called a special legislative session.

Waldron drafted a resolution calling for the complete support of Israel. This was one of three House resolutions related to the conflict, the other two being those of Randy Fine and Angie Nixon. Waldron's resolution passed unanimously.

=== 2024 Florida Legislative Session ===
At the beginning of the session, Waldron filed a bill to restrict the retail sale of pet rabbits in March and April. She claims that such a bill would limit the number of people who buy pet rabbits as an impulse purchase--especially around Easter.

After the issue was brought to her attention by a group of students from the University of Florida, Rep. Waldron sponsored a bill against corporal punishment. If this bill successfully passes, it will prevent all of a school's faculty and administration except the principal from applying such punishment to the students of any public or charter school. The bill bans the practice completely for homeless and special needs children.

== Election history ==
2022 Florida House of Representatives General election District 93
Party	Candidate	Votes	%
Democratic	Katherine Waldron	33,827	50.6
Republican	Saulis Banionis	32,963	49.4
Total votes		66,790	100%
Democratic hold			
