= Jon Albert =

American politician

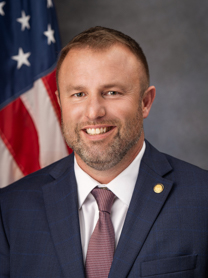

Member of the Florida House of Representatives from the 48th district
- Incumbent
- Assumed office November 5, 2024
- Preceded by: Sam Killebrew

Personal details
- Born: July 12, 1979 (age 47) Winter Haven, Florida, U.S.
- Party: Republican
- Spouse: Anna Albert
- Children: 2

Jon Albert (born July 12, 1979) is an American politician serving as a Republican member of the Florida House of Representatives for the 48th district. He served in the United States Marine Corps for nine years and ten months. He graduated from Chaminade University of Honolulu with an MBA. Albert was the mayor of Frostproof, Florida, from 2020 to 2024. He is a business owner, and also a Christian.
