= Chuck Clemons =

American politician

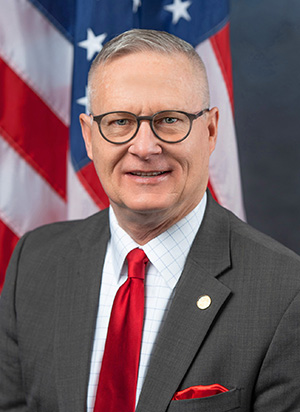

Speaker pro tempore of the Florida House of Representatives
- In office November 22, 2022 – November 19, 2024
- Preceded by: Bryan Avila
- Succeeded by: Wyman Duggan

Member of the Florida House of Representatives
- In office November 8, 2016 – November 5, 2024
- Preceded by: Keith Perry
- Succeeded by: Chad Johnson
- Constituency: 21st (2016–2022); 22nd (2022–2024)

Personal details
- Born: Charles Wesley Clemons; June 21, 1957 (age 69) Miami Beach, Florida, U.S.
- Party: Republican
- Spouse: Jane Clemons
- Children: 4
- Education: Florida Gateway College; University of Florida (BS)
- Website: Official website

Charles Wesley Clemons Sr. (born June 21, 1957) is an American politician who served in the Florida House of Representatives from the 21st district from 2016 to 2024.

Florida House of Representatives
Preceded by Bryan Avila	Speaker pro tempore of the Florida House of Representatives; 2022–2024	Succeeded by Wyman Duggan
