= Bobby Payne =

American politician from Florida

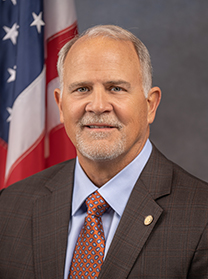

Member of the Florida House of Representatives
- In office November 8, 2016 – November 5, 2024
- Preceded by: Charles Van Zant
- Succeeded by: Judson Sapp
- Constituency: 19th district (2016–2022); 20th district (2022–2024)

Personal details
- Born: May 16, 1958 (age 68) Palatka, Florida, U.S.
- Party: Republican
- Spouse: Candice K. Brower -M. 2026 Margie Payne -M.1998 D.2021
- Education: Jacksonville University; Nova Southeastern University
- Occupation: Electric generation & transmission utility management
- Website: http://www.bobbypayne.net

Bobby Payne is an American politician who served as a Republican member of the Florida House of Representatives from 2016–2024.

== Career ==
Payne defeated two other candidates to win the August 30, 2016, Republican primary, winning 42.1% of the vote. In the November 8, 2016, general election, Payne easily defeated Democrat Joe Snodgrass, taking 72.5% of the vote.

Payne won re-election in 2018, defeating Democrat Paul Still with 73.4% of the vote.
