= August Mangeney =

American politician

Member of the Florida House of Representatives from the 93rd district
- Incumbent
- Assumed office November 3, 2026
- Preceded by: Anne Gerwig

Personal details
- Party: Democratic
- Website: Campaign website

August Mangeney is attorney serving in Florida's state legislature. A member of the Democratic Party, he has served in the Florida House of Representatives since 2026, representing the 93rd district. He unseated incumbent Republican Anne Gerwig in the 2026 election. He is an attorney from Lake Worth, Florida.
