= Andrew Learned =

American politician

Andrew P. Learned
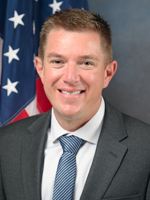

Member of the Florida House of Representatives from the 59th district
- In office November 3, 2020 – November 8, 2022
- Preceded by: Adam Hattersley
- Succeeded by: Danny Alvarez

Personal details
- Born: August 4, 1986 (age 40) Sarasota, Florida, U.S.
- Party: Democratic
- Spouse: Amanda
- Children: 2
- Education: University of Tampa (BA)

Military service
- Allegiance: United States
- Branch/service: United States Navy
- Rank: Lieutenant Commander

Andrew P. Learned is an American politician. He is a Democrat who represented the 59th district in the Florida House of Representatives for a single two-year term before losing re-election in 2022.

== Early life and education ==
Learned holds a Bachelor of Arts degree from the University of Tampa. Learned served in the United States Navy for four years before transferring to the United States Navy Reserve in 2013. He deployed to the Middle East three times.

== Career ==
In 2018, Learned ran for election to represent Florida's 15th congressional district, placing second in a three-way Democratic primary.

In 2020, he ran to represent the 59th district in the Florida House of Representatives. He was unopposed in the Democratic primary, and narrowly defeated Republican Michael Owen in the general election.

In 2022, Learned ran for re-election in the 69th district but lost to Republican Danny Alvarez by a 14 point margin.

=== Electoral record ===
2018 Democratic primary: Florida's 15th congressional district
Party	Candidate	Votes	%
Democratic	Kristen Carlson	24,498	53.4%
Democratic	Andrew Learned	14,509	31.6%
Democratic	Raymond Pena	6,912	15.1%

2020 general election: Florida House of Representatives, District 59
Party	Candidate	Votes	%
Democratic	Andrew Learned	45,683	50.7%
Republican	Michael Owen	44,413	49.3%

2022 general election: Florida House of Representatives, District 69
Party	Candidate	Votes	%
Republican	Danny Alvarez	34,570	57.1%
Democratic	Andrew Learned	25,984	42.9%
