= Mitch Rosenwald =

American politician

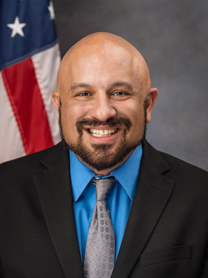

Member of the Florida House of Representatives from the 98th district
- Incumbent
- Assumed office November 5, 2024
- Preceded by: Patricia Hawkins-Williams

Personal details
- Born: October 22, 1970 (age 55) Towson, Maryland, U.S.
- Party: Democratic
- Education: Salisbury State University (BA); Syracuse University (MA); University of Maryland (MSW, DSW)

Mitch Rosenwald (born October 22, 1970) is an American politician, educator, and social worker who has served as a member of the Florida House of Representatives for the 98th district since 2024. A member of the Democratic Party, he previously served as a city commissioner for Oakland Park, Florida, and was mayor from 2023 to 2024.

== Early life and education ==
Rosenwald was born on October 22, 1970, in Towson, Maryland. He graduated from Salisbury State University with a bachelor's degree in sociology and economics in 1992. He later earned a Master of Arts in sociology from Syracuse University in 1993, and Master of Social Work (1997) and Doctor of Social Work (2004) from the University of Maryland.

== Career ==
Rosenwald works as a Licensed Clinical Social Worker and is a professor of social work at Barry University.

In 2020, Rosenwald was elected to the Oakland Park City Commission, serving until 2024. From 2023 to 2024, he served as mayor of Oakland Park.

In the 2024 Florida House of Representatives election, Rosenwald was elected to represent the 98th district in the Florida House of Representatives. He was re-elected in 2026. During his campaign, he was endorsed by the Dolphin Democrats.

== Personal life ==
Rosenwald is Jewish and openly gay. He moved to Florida in 2007 and lives in Broward County, Florida.
