= Danny Alvarez =

American politician

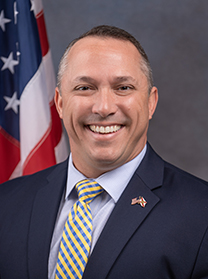

Member of the Florida House of Representatives from the 69th district
- Incumbent
- Assumed office November 8, 2022
- Preceded by: Andrew Learned
- Succeeded by: Ashley Herrmann (elect)

Personal details
- Born: Daniel Antonio Alvarez Miami, Florida, U.S.
- Party: Republican
- Education: University of Florida (BS); Troy University (MS); Stetson University (JD); University of Miami (LLM)

Daniel Antonio "Danny" Alvarez is an American politician. He serves as a Republican member for the 69th district of the Florida House of Representatives.

== Life and career ==
Alvarez is a first generation American born in Miami, Florida. His parents are Cuban immigrants. He attended the University of Florida, Troy University, Stetson University College of Law and the University of Miami School of Law. He is a veteran who was commissioned as an infantry officer in the United States Army and started his military career in the Florida National Guard. Alvarez graduated from the Infantry Officer Basic Course, the Bradley Fighting Vehicle Leader's Course, the United States Army Airborne School and the United States Army Jump Master School. He was a jumping member of the Fort Benning Command Exhibition Parachute Team, “The Silver Wings.”

Alvarez is an attorney with a business and family law background and is currently the general counsel to the Tampa Police Benevolent Association. Alvarez is also a business, marketing and corporate communication consultant who taught Business Law at the University of Tampa for almost 9 years.

In 2015, Tampa Hispanic Heritage, Inc. named Alvarez the Hispanic Man of the Year and he was also awarded the Al Gallon Ministries Community Service Person of the Year. Tampa Mayor Bob Buckhorn declared October 10, 2015 as Daniel A. Alvarez Hispanic Man of the Year Day in Tampa.

Alvarez was appointed by Governor Rick Scott to serve on the Tampa Hillsborough Expressway Authority and was later elected to Secretary of the Board. During his tenure, the Authority successfully built the $280 million Selmon Extension, an elevated highway over Gandy Boulevard in Tampa connecting the Lee Roy Selmon Expressway to the Gandy Bridge.

Alvarez ran for Circuit Court Judge in the 13th Judicial Circuit, Group 30 in Hillsborough County but was defeated by Helen Daniel.

In August 2022, Alvarez defeated Megan Petty in the Republican primary election for the 69th district of the Florida House of Representatives. In November 2022, he defeated incumbent Andrew Learned of District 59 in the general election, winning 57 percent of the votes. He succeeded Linda Chaney, who was redistricted to District 61. Alvarez won reelection in 2024 beating Democratic opponent Bobby Kachelries winning 58.2 percent of the votes.

As a sophomore, Alvarez was appointed the Chairman of the Criminal Justice Subcommittee and the Vice Chair of the House Committee on Security and Threat Assessment.

In 2025, Alvarez sponsored legislation to ban municipalities from putting fluoride, a substance that reduces tooth decay, in water. Alvarez also sponsored bills the same year to enhance fire-fighter health and safety, created a new excessive speeding law that could result in jail time for speeders and a bill to protect veterans from exploitative practices.
