= Gwyndolen Clarke-Reed =

American politician

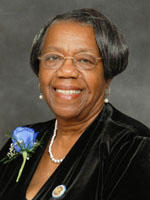

Member of the Florida House of Representatives from the 92nd district
- In office November 18, 2008 – November 8, 2016
- Preceded by: Jack Seiler
- Succeeded by: Patricia Hawkins-Williams

Personal details
- Born: October 24, 1940 (age 85) Deerfield Beach, Florida
- Party: Democratic
- Children: Vincent Leonard Clarke, Veronica Rose Clarke
- Education: New York City Community College (A.A.); Brooklyn College (B.S.); Adelphi University (M.S.)
- Profession: Educator

For the Mississippi politician, see Clarke Reed.

Gwyndolen Clarke-Reed (born October 24, 1940) was a Democratic member of the Florida House of Representatives, representing the 92nd District, which includes northeastern Broward County, stretching from Deerfield Beach to Fort Lauderdale, from 2008 to 2016, when she was term-limited.

== History ==
Clarke-Reed was born in Delray Beach, but moved to New York City, New York, where she attended New York City Community College, graduating with an Associate degree in 1968, and then Brooklyn College, graduating with a Bachelor's degree in 1973. She then attended Adelphi University, graduating with a Master's degree in 1979, at which point she began working for the New York City Department of Education as a teacher. Not long after starting her work as a teacher, she was elected to the New York City District 18 School Board, where she served from 1980 to 1983. Clarke-Reed ended her teaching career in New York City in 1985 and moved back to Florida, where she was elected as a Deerfield Beach City Commissioner, serving from 1993 to 2005.

== Florida House of Representatives ==
In 2008, following the inability of State Representative Jack Seiler to seek re-election due to term limits, Clarke-Reed ran to succeed him in the 92nd District. She faced Wilton Manors Mayor Scott Newton and accountant Mark J. LaFontaine in the Democratic primary, whom she defeated with 41% of the vote. She was elected unopposed in the general election. When she ran for re-election in 2010, she was opposed by Wilton Manors City Commissioner Justin Flippen in the Democratic primary, who attacked her for "accepting massive amounts of Republican money," to which Clarke-Reed responded, "You get contributions in campaigns from everywhere, from people who possibly have the same interests you have in a given issue." Ultimately, she defeated Flippen with 56% of the vote and was once again unopposed in the general election.

When Florida House of Representatives districts were redrawn in 2012, Clarke-Reed remained in the 92nd District, which, though redrawn, included most of the territory that she had previously represented. In both the Democratic primary and the general election, she was unopposed and won her third term in the House entirely uncontested.

While serving in the legislature, Clarke-Reed was the only legislator in her party to support legislation that would grant Miami Children's Hospital and The Villages "special exceptions to the state's process for determining if new hospital units, nursing homes or hospice centers are needed."
