= Rob Long (Florida politician) =

American politician

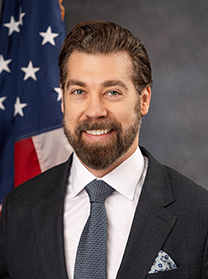

Member of the Florida House of Representatives from the 90th district
- Incumbent
- Assumed office December 9, 2025
- Preceded by: Joseph Casello

Personal details
- Born: January 13, 1985 (age 41) Gaithersburg, Maryland
- Party: Democratic
- Spouse: Alexandria "Alex" Ayala-Long
- Education: Pennsylvania State University (B.S.); University of Florida (MBA)
- Occupation: Engineer

Rob Long (born January 13, 1985) is a Democratic politician who has served as a member of the Florida House of Representatives from the 90th district since 2025.

== Early life ==
Long was born in Gaithersburg, Maryland, and attended Pennsylvania State University, receiving his bachelor's degree in civil engineering in 2008. He moved to Florida in 2008, and attended the University of Florida, where he graduated with his master of business administration in 2010.

In 2016, Long ran for the Palm Beach County Soil and Water Conservation District in Group 4 against incumbent Supervisor Dave Self. During the campaign, several political action committees sent mailers in support of Libertarian Karl Dickey, one of Long's opponents. Long won the election by a wide margin, receiving 48 percent of the vote to Dickey's 33 percent and Self's 19 percent. Long ran for re-election in 2020 and was challenged by businesswoman Candace Rojas. He was ultimately re-elected, winning 54 percent of the vote to Rojas's 46 percent.

Long served on Delray Beach Planning and Zoning Board, and attracted criticism from the City Commission for criticizing the city's water quality. Though the City Commission had suggested that it might remove him from the Board for his comments, it ultimately did not do so.

In 2023, Long ran for the Delray Beach City Commission, challenging incumbent City Commissioner Juli Casale. Long narrowly defeated Casale, winning 53 percent of the vote to her 47 percent.

== Florida House of Representatives ==
Long announced on February 11, 2025, that he would run to succeed Democratic State Representative Joseph Casello in the 90th district in the Florida House of Representatives, winning Casello's endorsement. On July 18, 2025, Casello died, triggering a special election. Long received endorsements from the local Democratic Party establishment, and ultimately won the Democratic nomination unopposed.

He faced Republican nominee Maria Zack, a lobbyist and conspiracy theorist, in the general election, along with independent candidate Karen Yeh. Long won the election in a landslide, receiving 63 percent of the vote to Zack's 36 percent and Yeh's 1 percent.
