= Judson Sapp =

American politician

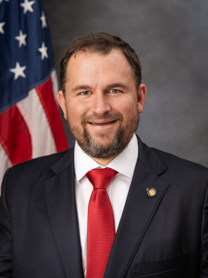

Member of the Florida House of Representatives from the 20th district
- Incumbent
- Assumed office November 5, 2024
- Preceded by: Bobby Payne

Personal details
- Party: Republican
- Spouse: Kelly Sapp

Judson Sapp is an American politician. He serves as a Republican member for the 20th district of the Florida House of Representatives.

He was a candidate for Florida's 3rd congressional district in the 2018 and 2020 elections.
