= Florida's 64th House of Representatives district =

Florida district

Florida's 64th State House of Representatives district
Representative
Susan Valdes; R–Tampa

Florida's 64th House of Representatives district elects one member of the Florida House of Representatives. It covers parts of Hillsborough County.

== Members ==
- Susan Valdes (since 2022)
