= Elizabeth Fetterhoff =

American politician from Florida

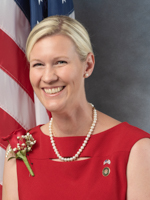

Member of the Florida House of Representatives from the 26th district
- In office November 6, 2018 – November 8, 2022
- Preceded by: Patrick Henry
- Succeeded by: Keith Truenow

Personal details
- Born: December 7, 1981 (age 44) DeLand, Florida
- Party: Republican
- Education: Tallahassee Community College; Florida State University
- Website: https://elizabethfetterhoff.com

Military service
- Allegiance: United States
- Branch/service: United States Army
- Unit: Florida Army National Guard

Elizabeth Fetterhoff is an American politician and Army veteran. A member of the Republican Party, she served in the Florida House of Representatives from 2018 to 2022, representing the 26th district.

== Early life ==
In 1981, Fetterhoff was born in DeLand, Florida. Fetterhoff's father is Roy Schleicher, a former politician. Fetterhoff's mother is Senta Goudy, a former reporter.

== Education ==
In 2009, Fetterhoff graduated with a BS degree in political science from Florida State University.

== Career ==
Fetterhoff served in the Florida Army National Guard. Fetterhoff was a legislative assistant to Senator Dorothy Hukill. Fetterhoff is a government affairs director for the New Smyrna Beach Board of Realtor.

Fetterhoff narrowly defeated Michael Cantu on August 28, 2018, in the Republican primary, winning by just 81 votes. In the November 8, 2018 general election, Fetterhoff narrowly defeated the incumbent, Patrick Henry, by just 61 votes, in a margin that triggered a manual recount.

After redistricting in 2020, Fetterhoff's seat was redrawn, and most of her constituents were in the 29th district. She ran for the 29th district seat, going against Webster Barnaby. She was defeated in the Republican primary on August 23, 2022.
