= Joseph Casello =

American politician (1952–2025)

Joe Casello
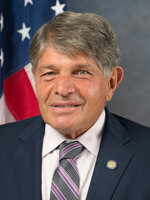

Member of the Florida House of Representatives from the 90th district
- In office November 6, 2018 – July 18, 2025
- Preceded by: Lori Berman
- Succeeded by: Rob Long

Personal details
- Born: February 20, 1952 Worcester, Massachusetts, U.S.
- Died: July 18, 2025 (aged 73)
- Party: Democratic
- Occupation: Firefighter, electrician, legislator

Joseph Anthony Casello (February 20, 1952 – July 18, 2025) was an American politician who was a Democratic member of the Florida Legislature, representing the State's 90th House district until his death in 2025. He resided in Boynton Beach, Florida, where he acted as city commissioner from March 12, 2013, to November 7, 2018.

== Early life and business career ==
Casello served as a non-commissioned officer in the United States Air Force, assigned to the 212th ANG Unit, responsible for the installation of radio transmission sites throughout the country.

In 1974, he was appointed to the Worcester Fire Department and promoted to lieutenant in 1984.

Casello attended public schools and graduated from Worcester Industrial Technical Institute in 1972 and Quinsigamond Community College in 2002, with an associate in science degree.

As a business owner and licensed electrical contractor for over 23 years, Casello operated Casello Electrical Services.

== Political career ==
Casello's first entry into politics was in 2013, where he ran in a close election for city commissioner, winning the seat by only three votes in a run-off election. After five years of serving in that position, he decided to run for election in Florida's 90th district. Casello was elected unopposed to the Florida House of Representatives on November 6, 2018.

== Death ==
While in office, Casello died from a heart attack on July 18, 2025, at age 73.
