= Florida's 98th House of Representatives district =

Florida district

Florida's 98th State House of Representatives district
Representative
Mitch Rosenwald; D–Lauderdale Lakes

Florida's 98th House of Representatives district elects one member of the Florida House of Representatives. It contains parts of Broward County.

== Members ==
- Mitch Rosenwald (since 2024)
