= Susan Valdes =

American politician from Florida

Susan L. Valdés
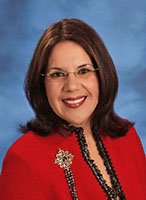

Member of the Florida House of Representatives
- Incumbent
- Assumed office November 6, 2018
- Preceded by: Janet Cruz
- Constituency: 62nd District (2018–2022); 64th District (2022–present)

Personal details
- Born: November 3, 1964 (age 62) New York, New York, U.S.
- Party: Democratic (before 2024); Republican (2024–present)
- Spouse: Gerardo Valdes (m. 1983)
- Education: A.P. Leto Comprehensive High School
- Alma mater: Nova Southeastern University (BBA) Manhattan College (MS)
- Occupation: Politician
- Salary: $29,697 per year
- Website: Campaign website

Susan Lopez Valdes (born November 3, 1964) is a Republican member of the Florida Legislature representing the State's 64th House district.

== Political career ==
Valdes started her political career in 2016 when she won a seat on the Hillsborough County school board.

Valdes was elected unopposed on November 6, 2018 from the platform of the Democratic Party.

In 2020 and 2022, her Democratic Party primary was canceled and she advanced to the general election without contest. Each time, she won reelection by a margin of over 5%.

On December 9, 2024, Valdes switched to the Republican party, only days after she lost a bid for Hillsborough County, Florida Democratic Party chairman. In a statement, Valdes, who is term limited and was recently re-elected as a Democrat, said she didn’t want to spend the next two years being "ignored" by her party.

== Electoral history ==
General election for Florida House of Representatives District 64, 2022
Party	Candidate	Votes	%
Democratic	Susan Valdes	22,745	53.3%
Republican	Maura Cruz Lanz	19,930	46.7%

General election for Florida House of Representatives District 62, 2020
Party	Candidate	Votes	%
Democratic	Susan Valdes	38,403	57.6%
Republican	Angel Urbina	25,136	37.7%
Other	Laurie Rodriguez-Person	3,183	4.8%

Democratic primary for Florida House of Representatives District 62, 2018
Party	Candidate	Votes	%
Democratic	Susan Valdes	4,756	46.5%
Democratic	Mike Alvarez	4,180	40.8%
Democratic	Christopher Cano	1,301	12.7%

Hillsborough County Public Schools District 1 Primary Election, 4-year term, 2016
Party	Candidate	Votes	%
Democratic	Susan Valdes	11,975	50.56%
Independent	Bill Person	11,708	49.44%
