= Florida's 103rd House of Representatives district =

Florida district

Florida's 103rd State House of Representatives district
Representative
| Robin Bartleman; D–Weston |

Florida's 103rd House of Representatives district elects one member of the Florida House of Representatives. It contains parts of Broward County.

== Members ==
- Robin Bartleman (since 2020)
