= Robin Bartleman =

American politician & educator (born 1972)

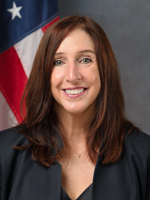

Member of the Florida House of Representatives from the 103rd district
- Incumbent
- Assumed office November 3, 2020
- Preceded by: Richard Stark

Personal details
- Born: August 27, 1972 (age 54)
- Party: Democratic
- Children: 2
- Education: Florida International University (BS); Nova Southeastern University (MS)

Robin Bartleman (born August 27, 1972) is an American legislator and educator serving as a member of the Florida House of Representatives from the 103rd district. She assumed office on November 3, 2020. She is a member of the Democratic Party.

== Education ==
Bartleman earned a Bachelor of Science degree in emotionally handicapped education from Florida International University in 1994 and a Master of Science in emotional disturbance education from Nova Southeastern University.

== Career ==
Bartleman has worked as a special education teacher and assistant school principal in the Liberty City neighborhood of Miami. Bartleman served one term as a Commissioner for the City of Weston, Florida, from 2000 to 2004.

=== School Board ===
Bartleman was a member of the Broward County School Board, representing a countywide seat, for 16 years, from 2004 to 2020. She was first elected in 2004 and was re-elected in 2008, 2012 and 2016.

She was also an advocate for children with disabilities, having been a teacher in the exceptional student educations (ESE) program in Miami for several years.

=== Florida House ===
She was elected to the Florida House of Representatives in November 2020, succeeding Richard Stark. In the House, she is ranking member on the healthcare regulation subcommittee and also serves on the local administrations, federal affairs and special districts subcommittee of the State Affairs Committee, as well as the agriculture, conservation and resiliency subcommittee and the health care appropriations subcommittee.

The old 104th district included Pembroke Pines, Weston, Southwest Ranches and the Everglades Wildlife Management Area.

In 2022, she was re-elected to the redrawn 103rd district, defeating Republican George Navarini in a rematch of the 2020 election, even as a "red wave" overtook much of Florida. Her campaign manager was Barbara Miller of Hallandale Beach.

The new district moved south and west and now incorporates all of Broward County east of U.S.-27, south and west of I-75, along with a slice of Pembroke Pines from Sheridan Street to Pembroke Road out to SW 136 Ave. Cities in the district include Weston, Pembroke Pines, Southwest Ranches, Miramar, Sunrise and Davie.

== Bills passed and signed into law ==
=== Blue Lights (HB 463) ===
This bill would allow firefighters to utilize blue lights at the rear of government-owned trucks if the truck weighs over 24,000 pounds. Multiple national studies show that the most visible combination of lights is blue and red; blue lights are best at night and red lights are best in the day. Florida became the twenty-ninth state to permit blue lights on fire trucks.

=== Community-based Mobile Crisis Intervention Services (HB 205) ===
Language from Bartleman's HB 205, supporting Mobile Response Teams, was folded into a larger healthcare package brought forth by Senate President Kathleen Passidomo (R). Mobile Response Teams (MRTs) are designed to provide 24/7 emergency behavioral healthcare to anyone in Florida. The main goal of MRTs is to respond to situations where the patient is having a severe emotional or behavioral health crisis and provide de-escalation, appropriate intervention, and resources in their community. This is intended to reduce trauma, prevent unnecessary hospitalizations, and reduce criminal justice involvement. HB 205's provisions, as included in the larger healthcare package, SB 7016, instruct the Agency for Health Care Administration to seek federal approval for a Medicaid state plan amendment to add coverage for community-based mobile crisis intervention services and to allow the state to access federal funding for these services.

=== Miya's Law ===
The legislation is named in honor of Miya Marcano, a college student who was killed in her apartment in Orlando. The perpetrator, a maintenance worker with a criminal record, allegedly entered her unit using a master key. Miya's Law aims to improve safety measures for the approximately 2 million renters in the state by requiring apartment complexes to conduct background checks on employees who have access to tenants' homes, extending the notice period for maintenance worker entry from 12 to 24 hours, establishing policies for the issuance and return of master keys, and maintaining a log of employees who enter units. Additionally, in an effort to combat human trafficking, the law prohibits public lodging establishments from charging hourly rates. These provisions aim to increase security for renters in Florida.

=== Flood control (HB 513) ===
The legislation includes $2 million in funding to expedite the study of the Central and Southern Florida (C&SF) Flood Control Project, which is an aging system of canals, drainage pumps, and gates that protect South Florida's 11 million residents, its economy, the freshwater aquifer, and the Everglades. The C&SF is experiencing increased strain due to rising sea levels and increased flooding. The bill, known as HB 513, aims to establish a system of accountability to ensure the necessary maintenance of the flood control system. Southeast Florida, which makes up over one third of Florida's economy, could potentially see job loss and a decline in tourism if the flood management systems are not properly maintained. The bill has received bipartisan support and was a priority for both Miami Dade and Broward County.

=== Serena's Law (HB 1229) ===
In 2021, a bill was passed and signed into law that eliminated a loophole allowing the identity of adults with a minor protection injunction to remain anonymous. This means that employers, like school administrators and summer camps, are now able to find out the identity of the respondent in these cases.

=== Medicaid health disparities (HB 855) ===
HB 855 is a bill aimed at increasing transparency in Florida's Medicaid program. The legislation aims to ensure that taxpayer dollars are used efficiently and effectively by requiring Medicaid programs to collect data on factors such as age, race, ethnicity, sex, and disability. This data will be used to address healthcare disparities and ensure that patients' needs are met. The COVID-19 pandemic has highlighted significant healthcare inequalities in the United States, and this bill aims to address this issue by attempting to improve access to high quality healthcare for Floridians.

=== Sea level rise resilience (HB 901) ===
Tropical Storm Eta caused flooding in Bartleman's district, resulting in damage to water management infrastructure. In response, House Bill 901 was written to require the state to conduct a comprehensive assessment of future spending by federal, state, and local governments to address both coastal and inland flooding. This assessment aims to ensure that fiscally responsible decisions are made regarding flood prevention and mitigation. HB 901 was subsequently incorporated into Representative Bussata Cabrera's House Bill 7019, which focused on statewide flooding and sea level rise resilience. The combined legislation was signed into law in 2021.

== Appropriations ==
=== 2021 ===
In 2021, Bartleman obtained close to $1 million in funding for a new pump station in Pembroke Pines, mobile storm water pumps for the South Broward Drainage District to use during flooding events, and flood control projects in Southwest Ranches. These resources were obtained to help reduce the impact of flooding in the region.

=== 2022 ===
Bartleman won $2,000,000 to reevaluate and study South Florida's aging flood system with the goal of making future improvements. She also won a total of $1,671,894 for three Southwest Ranches drainage improvement projects.

=== 2023 ===
Bartleman won $12,000 for the Weston Music Society, which educates schoolchildren in District 103's anchor city, and $50,000 for the Dellenbach Foundation, a group that aids those in critical need of assistance with financial aid, essential supplies and volunteer services.

Continuing her pattern of bringing back funds to deal with drainage issues, Bartleman also brought home $262,500 to rehabilitate three 96-inch drainage culverts in the South Broward Drainage District. If those culverts failed for lack of rehabilitation, catastrophic flooding could ensure, placing stretches of Broward County underwater. She also brought back $340,200 for further Southwest Ranches drainage improvement projects at the SW 185th Way and SW 57th Court right-of-way.

== Other legislation ==
Bartleman voted against legislation to restrict abortion in Florida to 15 weeks, giving a speech on the House floor explaining her reasons for doing so. She also voted against the congressional redistricting plan passed in a special session. Bartleman also voted against the "Don't Say Gay" bill and the bill to repeal the Reedy Creek Improvement Act that stripped Disney of its special tax privileges after it spoke out against the "Don't Say Gay" bill. Bartleman also voted against an expansion of school vouchers, citing the toll on public schools and a lack of accountability.

== Boards and organizations ==
- Florida PTA, Lifelong Member
- Pembroke Pines Miramar Regional Chamber of Commerce, 2020–Present
- Broward County Environmental Caucus, 2019–Present
- St. Bonaventure Usher Ministry, 2015–Present
- Moms Demand Action, 2014–Present
- Mujeras Latinas, 2005–Present
- American Association of University Women, 2004–Present
- Broward County Climate Change Taskforce, 2016 - 2020
- Broward County Comprehensive School Health Advisory Committee Member, 2014 - 2020
- Circuit 17 Juvenile Justice Advisory Board Member, 2012 - 2020
- Take Stock in Children Mentor, 2009 - 2020
- Past Chair and board member of Broward County Children's Services Council, 2008 - 2020
- Broward County Children's Services Council Special Needs Advisory Coalition Chair, 2006 - 2020
- Broward County Value Adjustment Board, 2009 - 2012
- Broward Early Learning Coalition Board Member, 2004 - 2012

== Other professional experience ==
- Teacher of Students with Severe Emotional and Behavioral Disabilities, 1994 - 2000

== Awards ==
- Florida Policy Institute's Policy Pioneer Award for spearheading policy to improve health equity and children's well-being, 2022
- FEA, Freshman Legislative Friend of Public Education Award, 2021
- Florida League of Cities Legislative Appreciation Award, 2021
- Florida School Board Association Legislator of the Year, 2021
- Miramar-Pembroke Pines Regional Chamber of Commerce Community Leadership Award, 2021
- Florida PTA Lifetime Membership Recognition, 2020
- Broward AFL-CIO Service Award, 2019
- Broward Young Democrats Young at Heart Award, 2019
- Broward AFL-CIO Service Award, 2019
- Florida Initiative for Suicide Prevention Humanitarian Award, 2018
- Smith Community Mental Health Foundation Drive to Thrive Award, 2018
- Florida Initiative for Suicide Prevention FISPY Humanitarian Award, 2018
- Smith Community Mental Health Foundation Drive to Thrive Award, 2018
- Broward County Historical Commission Certificate of Appreciation for Dedication to our Community and Public Service, 2015
- Broward College Recognition of Valuable Contributions to the Social and Behavioral Science Department, 2015
- Broward County PTA – Certificate of Appreciation for Outstanding Service to Children and Youth in the Community, 2014
- Shooting Star Award – Catholic Hospice, 2014
- League of Women Voters of Florida, Up and Coming Future Leader and Young Elected to Watch, 2012
- Broward County Young Democrats Bob Gross Young Democrat of the Year, 2012
- Early Learning Coalition of Broward Inc. Certificate of Appreciation, 2011
- The Center for Independent Living of Broward, Advocate of Distinction, 2010
- Sistrunk Historical Festival Outstanding Achievement Honoree, 2009
- Florida School Counselor Association Advocate of the Year, 2009
- American Jewish Congress Distinguished Civic Achievement Award, 2009
- Community Builder's Award from the Caribbean American Democratic Club, 2009
- Deerfield Beach Democratic Club Honoree, 2009
- National Alliance on Mental Illness Honoree, 2008
- American Women's Business Association Award - School Board Member of the Year, 2007
- Black Elected Officials Community Service Award, 2007
- Certified Board Member Program sponsored by the Florida School Board Association, 2007
- Outstanding Mother – Healthy Mothers-Healthy Babies Coalition of Broward County 2006
- Martin Luther King Jr Humanitarian Award, City of Weston, 2006
- Outstanding Mother of the Year from the Healthy Mothers – Healthy Babies Coalition of Broward County, 2006
- Koinonia Worship Center and Village Center Certificate of Appreciation, 2006
- Dolphins Democrats President's Award, 2005
- Broward Young Democrats' Trailblazer of the Year, 2004
