= Florida's 90th House of Representatives district =

Florida district

Florida's 90th State House of Representatives district
Representative
Rob Long; D–Delray Beach

Florida's 90th House of Representatives district elects one member of the Florida House of Representatives. It contains parts of Palm Beach County.

== Members ==
- Lori Berman (2012–2018)
- Joseph Casello (2018–2025)
- Rob Long (since 2025)
