= Patricia Hawkins-Williams =

American politician

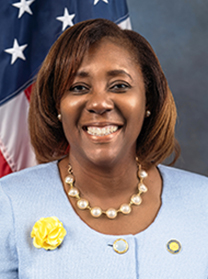

Member of the Florida House of Representatives
- In office November 8, 2016 – November 5, 2024
- Preceded by: Gwyndolen Clarke-Reed
- Succeeded by: Mitch Rosenwald
- Constituency: 98th district (2022–2024); 92nd district (2016–2022)

Personal details
- Born: October 23, 1965 (age 60) Fort Lauderdale, Florida
- Party: Democratic
- Children: Jay, Jaleesa, Ronia, Katherine, Maxwell, Nicki
- Education: University of Phoenix (B.A.M.)
- Occupation: Retired Early Learning Director

Patricia Hawkins-Williams (born October 23, 1965) is an American politician who served in the Florida House of Representatives from 2016 to 2024 and as a member of the Lauderdale Lakes City Commission. Hawkins-Williams was elected to the State House in 2016 from the 92nd district, succeeding term-limited State Representative Gwyndolen Clarke-Reed. She was re-elected in 2018 and 2020. In 2022, she ran for re-election in the 98th district, and was re-elected to her final term.
