= Florida's 93rd House of Representatives district =

Florida district

Florida's 93rd State House of Representatives district
Representative
August Mangeney; D–Lake Worth

Florida's 93rd House of Representatives district elects one member of the Florida House of Representatives. It contains parts of Palm Beach County.

== Members ==
- Chip LaMarca (2018–2022)
- Katherine Waldron (2022–2024)
- Anne Gerwig (2024–2026)
- August Mangeney (since 2026)
