= Vance Aloupis =

American politician from Florida

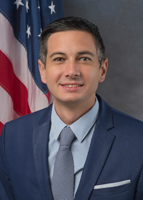

Member of the Florida House of Representatives from the 115th district
- In office November 6, 2018 – November 3, 2022
- Preceded by: Michael Bileca
- Succeeded by: Alina Garcia

Personal details
- Born: Vance Arthur Aloupis Jr. August 17, 1983 (age 43) Bangor, Maine, U.S.
- Party: Republican
- Spouse: Mariella
- Education: University of Miami (BBA); University of Miami School of Law (JD)
- Occupation: Non-profit executive
- Website: vancealoupis.com

Vance Arthur Aloupis Jr. (born August 17, 1983) is an American politician who served as a Republican member of the Florida House of Representatives from 2018 to 2023, representing the state's 115th district, which includes part of Miami-Dade County.

== History ==
Aloupis was born on August 17, 1983, in Bangor, Maine, before moving to Florida in 1992. He attended the University of Miami, where he served as the student body president, and later graduated from the University of Miami School of Law. Aloupis began his legal career with Legal Services of Greater Miami. In 2010, he joined the Children's Movement of Florida, a 501(c)(3) non-profit, nonpartisan organization that advocates for high-quality early learning opportunities, access to children's health care, and parent support programs in Florida. Aloupis presently serves as the organization's Chief Executive Officer.

In 2014, Vance was honored by the University of Florida as the Young Floridian of the Year. In 2016, he received the Emerging Leader Award from Florida International University's Center for Leadership.

== Florida House of Representatives ==
Aloupis defeated three opponents in the August 28, 2018, Republican primary, winning 34.1% of the vote. In the November 6, 2018, general election, Aloupis won 50.46% of the vote, defeating Democrat Jeffrey Solomon.
