= Ardian Zika =

American politician (born 1980)

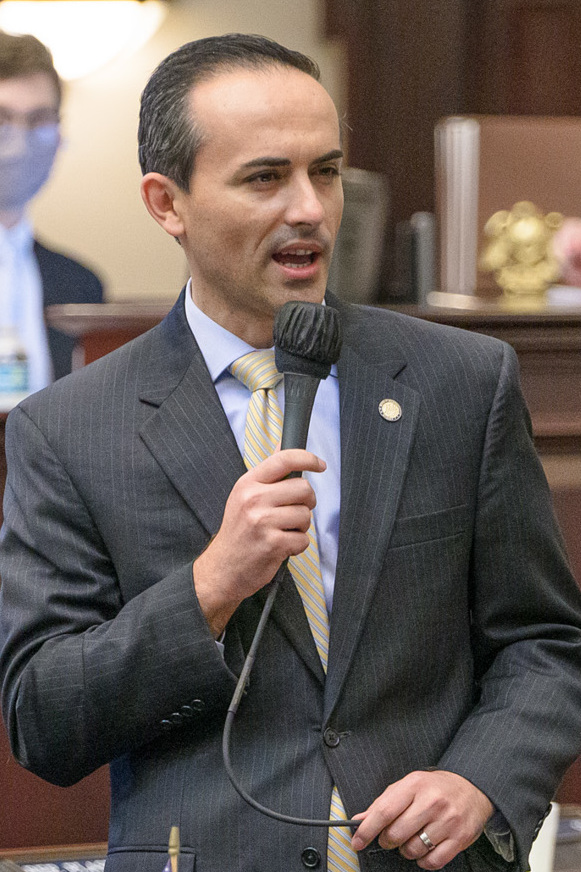

Member of the Florida House of Representatives from the 37th district
- In office November 6, 2018 – November 8, 2022
- Preceded by: Richard Corcoran
- Succeeded by: Susan Plasencia

Personal details
- Born: February 17, 1980 (age 46) Yugoslavia
- Party: Republican
- Spouse: Tasha R. Zika (m. 2008)
- Children: 5
- Education: Louisiana Tech University; Saint Leo University
- Occupation: Businessman; politician

Ardian Zika (born February 17, 1980) is an American businessman, banker and former politician who served as a Republican member of the Florida Legislature representing the state's 37th House district, which encompasses parts of Pasco County. On May 5, 2022, he announced not to run for a third time, and resigned from office on November 8, 2022.

== Early life and education ==
Zika was born and raised in Kosovo, then Yugoslavia. He immigrated to the United States in 1997, aged 17, with his family during the Yugoslav Wars on a refugee visa. He graduated from high school in Louisiana. Zika moved to Florida after graduating from college in 2005.

He graduated from Louisiana Tech University in Ruston, Louisiana, in 2002 with a Bachelor of Science in Marketing and in 2012 with a Master of Business Administration from St. Leo University in St. Leo, Florida.

== Career ==
Zika spent over 15 years of his early career in banking. He currently is the president and chairman of Guardian Street, LLC, a private business advisory practice specializing in middle-market companies.

== Politics ==
Zika began his political career as a congressional intern which he spent in Washington, D.C., during June and July 2000.

He defeated two candidates in the August 28, 2018, Republican primary, winning 57.5% of the vote. In the November 8, 2018, general election, Zika won 60.47% of the vote, defeating Democrat Tammy Garcia.

== Personal life ==
Zika is married to Tasha R. Zika (b. c. 1982) since 2008. They have five children and reside in Land o' Lakes, Florida. Zika is a Baptist and active member of the Idlewild Baptist Church in Lutz, Florida.
