= Yvonne Hayes Hinson =

Member of Florida House of Representatives

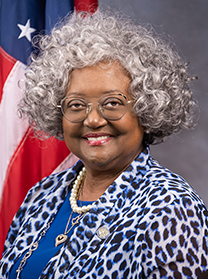

Member of the Florida House of Representatives from the 21st district
- Incumbent
- Assumed office November 3, 2020
- Preceded by: Clovis Watson Jr.
- Succeeded by: Jacquelyn Randall (elect)

Personal details
- Born: Gainesville, Florida, U.S.
- Party: Democratic
- Children: 2
- Education: University of Florida

Yvonne Hayes Hinson is an American politician who currently serves as the representative for Florida House of Representatives District 21 as a member of the Democratic Party.

== Career ==
Hinson was elected to the State House in 2020 in District 20.

She endorsed Charlie Crist for the 2022 Florida gubernatorial election.

On April 21, 2022, Hinson attempted to stage a sit-in demonstration to prevent a vote on Florida's congressional district maps. Opponents of the tactic compared her actions to an insurrection. The demonstration was ultimately unsuccessful.

== Elections ==
2018 Florida's 3rd Congressional District primary election
Party	Candidate	Votes	%
Democratic	Yvonne Hayes Hinson	31,655	59.5
Democratic	Tom Wells	17,663	33.2
Democratic	Dushyant Gosai	3,883	7.3
Total votes		53,201	100%

2018 Florida's 3rd Congressional District general election
Party	Candidate	Votes	%
Republican	Ted Yoho (Incumbent)	176,616	57.6
Democratic	Yvonne Hayes Hinson	129,880	42.4
Total votes		306,496	100%

Florida House of Representatives District 20 Democratic primary
Party	Candidate	Votes	%
Democratic	Yvonne Hayes Hinson	16,208	60.2
Democratic	Rodney Long	10,723	39.8
Total votes		26,931	100%
