= Wyman Duggan =

American politician from Florida

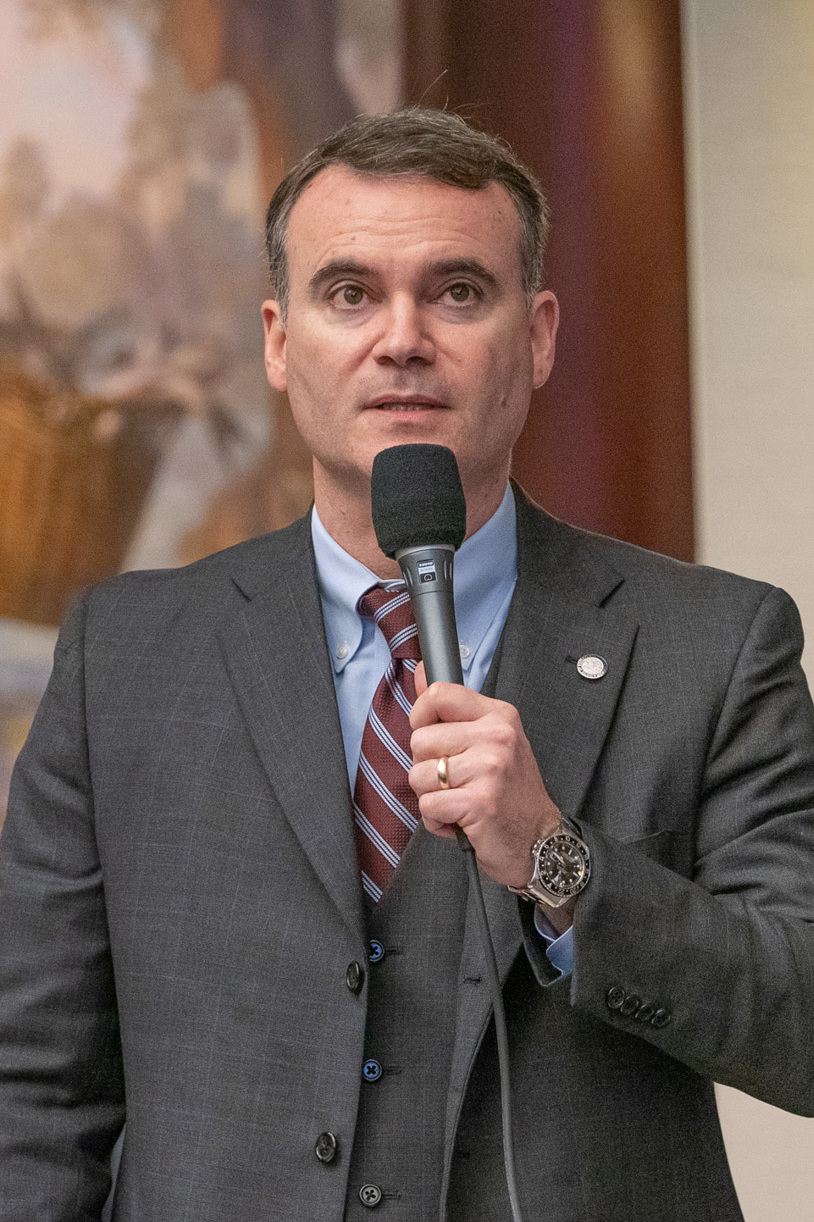
- Duggan in 2020

Acting Speaker of the Florida House of Representatives
- In office August 21, 2026 – November 3, 2026
- Preceded by: Daniel Perez
- Succeeded by: Sam Garrison

Speaker pro tempore of the Florida House of Representatives
- In office November 19, 2024 – November 3, 2026
- Preceded by: Chuck Clemons

Member of the Florida House of Representatives
- In office November 6, 2018 – November 3, 2026
- Preceded by: Jay Fant
- Succeeded by: Terrance Freeman
- Constituency: 15th district (2018–2022); 12th district (2022–present)

Personal details
- Born: April 26, 1969 (age 57) Jacksonville, Florida, U.S.
- Party: Republican
- Education: University of the South (BA); College of William and Mary (JD)

Wyman Duggan is an American politician currently serving as the acting speaker of the Florida House of Representatives since 2026 and as the speaker pro tempore since 2024. A member Republican Party, Duggan has served as a member of the Florida Legislature representing the state's 12th House district since 2018. The district includes parts of Duval County.

== Early life ==
On April 26, 1969, Duggan was born in Jacksonville, Florida.

== Career ==
Duggan received 40% of the vote in the August 28, 2018, Republican primary, defeating Joseph Hogan and Mark Zeigler. In the November 6, 2018, general election, Duggan narrowly defeated Democrat Tracy Polson, winning 50.93% of the vote.

== Committee assignments ==
- Insurance & Banking Subcommittee (Chair)
- Commerce Committee
- Energy, Communications & Cybersecurity Subcommittee
- Ways & Means Committee
- Justice Appropriations Subcommittee

== Legislation ==
In 2024 Duggan sponsored a bill to abolish police review boards.

Florida House of Representatives
Preceded by Chuck Clemons	Speaker pro tempore of the Florida House of Representatives; 2024–present	Incumbent
Preceded by Daniel Perez	Speaker of the Florida House of Representatives; Acting; 2026–present	Incumbent
