= Florida Senate Bill 266 =

Florida legislation dealing with public universities

Florida Legislature
- Citation: House Bill 999
- Passed by: Florida Senate
- Passed: April 28, 2023
- Passed by: Florida House of Representatives
- Passed: May 3, 2023
- Signed by: Ron DeSantis
- Signed: May 15, 2023
- Commenced: July 1, 2023

Legislative history

Initiating chamber: Florida Senate
- Bill title: Higher Education
- Introduced by: Erin Grall
- Status: In force

Florida Senate Bill 266, also commonly known by its Florida House of Representatives counterpart House Bill 999, is Florida legislation relating to public universities within the state. Under the legislation, diversity, equity and inclusion (DEI) programs and certain college majors relating to DEI would be eliminated or heavily restricted; the legislation phrases such courses as being based on "unproven, theoretical, or exploratory content". The legislation would prohibit state universities from including DEI and political identity filters within higher education hiring processes, and bans the usage of critical race theory in hiring. The law was filed in the Florida House of Representatives on February 21, 2023, by Republican representative Alex Andrade, while a Florida Senate version was filed seven days later by Republican state senator Erin Grall. The senate version of the legislation, which was noted as less intense in its requirements than the house version, ultimately passed and was signed by governor Ron DeSantis, concurrently with the similar Florida House Bill 931, on May 15, 2023. SB 266 took effect on July 1, 2023.

The law, which would ban multiple minority race studies as well as some parts of gender studies, is seen by both supporters and opponents as part of the manifestation of DeSantis' wide-reaching educational proposals. Akin to the Florida Parental Rights in Education Act (or the Don't Say Gay Act as described by opposition and protestors), SB 266 and HB 999 also became subject to widespread backlash from students, with protests beginning to be staged at high schools and state universities within days of its initial introduction into the Florida legislature.

== Background ==
Under DeSantis, Florida has seen a wide number of bills relating to restricting education in the state. The most notable of these bills was the Parental Rights in Education Act, a law which restricted the instruction of homosexuality, gender identity, and various other LGBT+ issues and content within public elementary schools up to third grade. The law was dubbed by critics and a very large opposition as the Don't Say Gay act (less commonly the Don't Say Gay or Trans act), and was the subject of massive protests (particularly by students) across the country. The law was additionally protested by organizations representing various groups of people, from lawyers to pediatricians, and received scrutiny from the US federal government and a United Nations-affiliated official on LGBT+ discrimination. The entertainment industry also heavily mobilized against the bill, with DeSantis and the Florida legislator retaliating against The Walt Disney Company in particular by repealing the Reedy Creek Improvement District, which houses Walt Disney World.

== Provisions ==
=== HB 999 ===
HB 999 would prohibit colleges from funding or backing any college programs or campus activities which support or "espouse" DEI. The bill bans courses “based on unproven, theoretical, or exploratory content,” leading critics to ask if that includes the theories explaining evolution, gravity, theoretical physics. Gender studies, critical race theory, and intersectionality would also all be prohibited from being taught as majors. The bill additionally recommends the rewriting of universities' mission statements. Prior to amendments suggested in early April 2023, women's history and women's studies would also be among the affected disciplines.

The bill would empower the Florida public university system's Board of Governors to enforce the law as it sees fit; 14 of the 17 seats on the Board of Governors are appointed directly by Florida's state governor. Each individual university's board of trustees would further gain the ability to review faculty members' tenure at will.

=== SB 266 ===
The senate bill which ultimately passed, by comparison to the house version of the legislation, explicitly limited a smaller number of topics and did not ultimately say in which parts of education where they should be limited. By further contrast to HB 999, SB 266's languages prohibits “theories that systemic racism, sexism, oppression, and privilege are inherent in the institutions of the United States and were created to maintain social, political and economic inequities". The courses under SB 266 are prohibited from core requirements, though after a review by Florida state officials and committees, may be permitted into electives. SB 266 further allows DEI programs to be funded publicly if "an accrediting body" required such programs.

== Legislative history ==
The house version's first reading occurred on March 7, 2023, and was favorably received by the Postsecondary Education and Workforce Subcommittee on March 13, which voted along party lines to advance the bill.

Senate Bill 266 advanced in the Florida state senate's appropriations committee on April 13, 2023. The Florida Senate passed the bill on April 28, 2023, by a margin of 27-12. The House version of the bill passed by a vote of 81-34 on May 3, 2023.

Governor Ron DeSantis signed the bill concurrently with Florida House Bill 931 on May 15, 2023. The law took effect on July 1, 2023.

== Support and opposition ==
=== Support ===
DeSantis' office has backed the bill, saying that it is necessary to prevent colleges and higher education within the state of Florida from leaning too far towards the Democratic Party. A statement released by his office claims that backers to American liberalism "suppress free thought in the name of identity politics and indoctrination", and that a "course correction" is necessary. Florida's education commissioner, Manny Díaz, further backs the bill, claiming the administration he works under wishes that students learn to pursue the truth. Both Diaz and DeSantis alludes that the opposition to HB 999 intends to impose ideology or a whim ideology on students.

The National Review ran articles in support of the passage of the act, claiming that granting the ability for university boards to review faculty is a positive, and that the bill's mandates on civic education and the study of Western civilization are an improvement to the university curriculum. Stanley Kurtz argues that professors are promoting what he sees as an unnecessary fear of educating students on the Bill of Rights, the US Constitution, and the Federalist Papers. Kurtz further argues that stuff would mostly be the same under the faculty tenure review provisions, and that university presidential review would help to further the mission of the university.

=== Student protests ===
Akin to Florida's Parental Rights in Education Act, students have been the most prominent demographic group opposed to the bill. Protests against the bill were noted to start almost immediately after the legislation was first introduced. Protests were first noted at Florida International University (FIU), Florida State University (FSU), the University of Florida (UF), and the University of South Florida (USF). A smaller protest was also staged at the University of Central Florida (UCF), and protests were additionally held at Florida Atlantic University (FAU) and Florida Gulf Coast University (FGCU).

On March 7, 2023, at USF, students rallied and sat in outside a board of trustees meeting, to which the board seemed receptive to. The students outside dropped a banner off of a parking garage which read "stop house bill 999", and both outside and during the sit in, signs reading "Stop Death-Santis" and "Black Lives Matter" were held by students. Inside the board meeting, a letter signed by 30 university student organizations stated that the bill would restrict funding to an untold number of activities and organizations. The previous Monday, the University of South Florida was also the site of a protest, in which three students and one university employee were arrested for "causing a loud disturbance" and battery of law enforcement.

FSU and FAMU students organized a protest against the bill in Tallahassee, the capital of Florida, on March 6, 2023. Groups who considered themselves at-risk due to the bill, including the FSU Black Student Union and Women Student Union, supported this protest. FSU students' protests were additionally supported by Democratic politicians serving in the Florida legislature. Many of the students at the protest expressed their opposition to the bill was rooted in either FSU's tradition for activism, the danger that the bill would pose to some groups' funding, or to protest the censorship of education. Students from other public Florida universities were noted to have travelled to Tallahassee to join the FSU protest. Students at New College of Florida, in Sarasota, protested on May 15, 2023, outside the campus building where DeSantis signed SB266.

Students also opposed the bill outside of Florida. Technician, North Carolina State University's student-run newspaper, blasted the bill and labelling it as white supremacy "at its finest". Technician further condemned the bill for including the board's ability to remove professors at will, which would enable schools to "bully" out professors for holding differing views.

=== Other opposition ===
Legislators in the Florida legislature have raised alarm to line 315 of the bill in particular, the provision restricting public universities' use of funds to support DEI efforts. Democratic state representative Yvonne Hinson raises concern that the legislation would potentially impact the ability of black sororities to continue to function, despite the attempt of Andrade to calm her fears. Florida state senator Shevrin Jones, in an op-ed written for MSNBC, also raised the possibility that House Bill 999 could be used in the future by DeSantis and his supporters to censor and cut funding to the Divine Nine historically-Black college fraternities and sororities. Jones, an alumnus of Alpha Phi Alpha, stated that while some language from the bill was removed which could harm the Divine Nine and other Black Greek life organizations, he remains doubtful that he in good faith can still support the legislation due to its attacks on DEI, a set of values he sees as essential to education.

The American Council of Learned Societies (ACLS) raised its own protest against the bill and started an online petition signed by numerous organizations and students. The ACLS not only argues that the censorship presented under HB 999's passage would prevent learning, but that Florida universities would lose accreditation for federal funds and prevent numerous low-income students from attending college. Students from across the United States and the world have signed the petition, as have many organizations, including the American Historical Association, the College Art Association, the Association for Jewish Studies, and the Middle East Studies Association of North America. The American Historical Association further submitted its own protest letter signed by many of the same organizations.

NCF Freedom – an organization which arose out of DeSantis’s conservative takeover of the New College of Florida – filed a lawsuit against the state of Florida on August 10. The complaint alleged that SB266 violated students’ and professors’ free speech in limiting what subjects could or could not be learned and taught. Plaintiffs included NCF Freedom, as well as New College students and professors. An injunction was filed weeks later in the hopes that enforcement of SB266 would be halted until a ruling on the complaint was made. However, on November 2, the judge presiding over the injunction denied the motion.

Historians further expressed their opposition by criticizing the bill for effectively threatening academic freedom. Through its ban of critical race theory, the American Historian Association slammed the bill, as it is argued that teaching accurate American History is impossible without covering concepts related to slavery in the United States and America's history with racism.

== See also ==
- Anti-LGBT curriculum laws in the United States
- Culture war
- Ending Radical and Wasteful Government DEI Programs and Preferencing (14151, 2025)
- Florida Parental Rights in Education Act (HB 1557, 2022)
- Racism in the United States
  - Institutional racism in the United States
  - Schuette v. Coalition to Defend Affirmative Action (572 U.S. 291, 2014)
  - White supremacy in U.S. school curriculum
- Social conservatism in the United States
- Students for Fair Admissions v. Harvard (600 U.S. 181, 2023)
