= Florida's 48th House of Representatives district =

Florida district

Florida's 48th State House of Representatives district
Representative
Jon Albert; R–Winter Springs

Florida's 48th House of Representatives district elects one member of the Florida House of Representatives. It covers parts of Polk County.

== Members ==
- Roger H. Wilson (1968–1972)
- Chester Clem (1972–1976)
- Dale Patchett (1976–1982)
- Jon Albert (since 2024)
