= Florida's 69th House of Representatives district =

Florida district

Florida's 69th State House of Representatives district
Representative
Danny Alvarez; R–Brandon

Florida's 69th House of Representatives district elects one member of the Florida House of Representatives. It covers parts of Hillsborough County.

== Members ==
- Danny Alvarez (since 2022)
