= Florida's 21st House of Representatives district =

American legislative district

Florida's 21st State House of Representatives district
Representative
Yvonne Hayes Hinson; D–Gainesville

Florida's 21st House of Representatives district elects one member of the Florida House of Representatives. It covers parts of Alachua County and Marion County.

== Members ==
- Yvonne Hayes Hinson (since 2020)
