= Florida's 20th House of Representatives district =

American legislative district

Florida's 20th State House of Representatives district
Representative
Judson Sapp; R–Green Cove Springs

Florida's 20th House District elects one member of the Florida House of Representatives. It has been represented by Judson Sapp since 2024.

The district covers all of Putnam County and parts of Clay County, Marion County, and St. Johns County.
