= 2026 Florida House of Representatives election =

2026 State election

2026 Florida House of Representatives elections
- November 3, 2026

All 120 seats in the Florida House of Representatives 61 seats needed for a majority

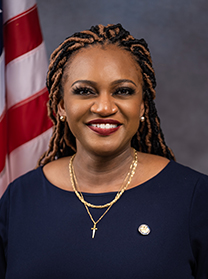
	Majority party	Minority party
Leader	Wyman Duggan (acting)	Fentrice Driskell (term-limited)
Party	Republican	Democratic
Leader since	August 21, 2026	November 22, 2022
Leader's seat	12th – Jacksonville	67th – Tampa
Last election	85 seats, 70.8%	35 seats, 29.2%
Seats before	83	34
Seats won	70	50
Seat change	▼13	▲16
- Gains and Holds: Democratic hold Democratic gain Republican hold Republican gain
Speaker before election
Wyman Duggan (acting)
Republican
Elected Speaker
TBD

The 2026 Florida House of Representatives elections were held on November 3, 2026, as part of the 2026 midterm elections, during Ron DeSantis's second term. Florida voters elected representatives from all 120 congressional districts.

While Republicans maintained the majority, this was the first time since 2020 of which they failed to achieve a two-thirds supermajoity, as Democrats had a net gain of 15 seats. At 50 seats, Democrats won their largest number of seats in the chamber since 1998.

== Results ==
Parties	Popular vote			Seats			
Parties	Vote	%	Change	2024	2026	+/−	Strength
Republican Party of Florida				85	70	▼16	
Florida Democratic Party				35	50	▲15	
Libertarian Party of Florida				—	—	—	—
MGTOW Party				—	—	—	—
Constitution Party of Florida				—	—	—	—
Independent (NPA)				—	—	—	—
Write-in (WRI)				—	—	—	—
Totals		100.00%	—	120	120	Steady	100.00%
Source: Florida Department of State

== Results by district ==
District	2024 Pres.	Incumbent	Party	Elected	Party
1	R+25.8	Michelle Salzman	Rep	Michelle Salzman	Rep
2	R+19.1	Alex Andrade†	Rep	Jon Fay	Rep
3	R+54.9	Nathan Boyles	Rep	Nathan Boyles	Rep
4	R+38.6	Patt Maney	Rep	Patt Maney	Rep
5	R+58.7	Shane Abbott	Rep	Shane Abbott	Rep
6	R+47.2	Philip Griffitts	Rep	Tricia Berry	Rep
7	R+54.2	Jason Shoaf	Rep	Jason Shoaf	Rep
8	D+42.7	Gallop Franklin	Dem	Gallop Franklin	Dem
9	D+4.4	Allison Tant	Dem	Allison Tant	Dem
10	R+46.4	Chuck Brannan†	Rep	Marshall Rawson	Rep
11	R+34.8	Sam Garrison	Rep	Sam Garrison	Rep
12	R+10.2	Wyman Duggan†	Rep	Terrance Freeman	Rep
13	D+23.8	Angie Nixon†	Dem	Audrey Gibson	Dem
14	D+25.6	Kimberly Daniels	Dem	Kimberly Daniels	Dem
15	R+27.9	Dean Black	Rep	Dean Black	Rep
16	R+20.6	Kiyan Michael	Rep	Kiyan Michael	Rep
17	R+12.4	Jessica Baker	Rep	Jessica Baker	Rep
18	R+33.9	Kim Kendall	Rep	Kim Kendall	Rep
19	R+24.7	Sam Greco	Rep	Sam Greco	Rep
20	R+48.5	Judson Sapp	Rep	Judson Sapp	Rep
21	D+21.4	Yvonne Hayes Hinson†	Dem	Jacquelyn Randall	Dem
22	R+6.2	Chad Johnson	Rep	Amy Trask	Dem Flip
23	R+45.6	J.J. Grow	Rep	J.J. Grow	Rep
24	R+28.0	Ryan Chamberlin	Rep	Ryan Chamberlin	Rep
25	R+16.7	Taylor Yarkosky	Rep	Taylor Yarkosky	Rep
26	R+28.8	Nan Cobb	Rep	Nan Cobb	Rep
27	R+37.1	Richard Gentry	Rep	Richard Gentry	Rep
28	R+16.0	Bill Partington	Rep	Bill Partington	Rep
29	R+16.0	Webster Barnaby	Rep	Webster Barnaby	Rep
30	R+30.7	Chase Tramont	Rep	Chase Tramont	Rep
31	R+26.1	Tyler Sirois†	Rep	Matt Woodside	Rep
32	R+19.9	Brian Hodgers	Rep	Brian Hodgers	Rep
33	R+11.4	Monique Miller	Rep	Daniel McDow	Dem Flip
34	R+14.9	Robert Brackett	Rep	Robert Brackett	Rep
35	R+4.1	Erika Booth	Rep	Eric Gray	Dem Flip
36	R+3.1	Rachel Plakon	Rep	Darryl Block	Dem
37	D+2.8	Susan Plasencia†	Rep	Jane Aman	Dem Flip
38	D+1.7	David Smith†	Rep	Nik Dean	Dem Flip
39	R+3.2	Doug Bankson	Rep	Jarod Fox	Dem Flip
40	D+35.2	RaShon Young	Dem	RaShon Young	Dem
41	D+42.3	Bruce Antone	Dem	Bruce Antone	Dem
42	D+15.0	Anna V. Eskamani†	Dem	Felipe Sousa-Lazaballet	Dem
43	D+10.8	Johanna López†	Dem	Samuel Vilchez Santiago	Dem
44	D+10.8	Rita Harris	Dem	Rita Harris	Dem
45	R+0.6	Leonard Spencer	Dem	Leonard Spencer	Dem
46	D+12.2	Jose Alvarez	Dem	Jose Alvarez	Dem
47	R+2.8	Paula Stark†	Rep	Anthony Nieves	Dem Flip
48	R+16.0	Jon Albert	Rep	Jon Albert	Rep
49	R+32.9	Jennifer Kincart Jonsson	Rep	Jennifer Kincart Jonsson	Rep
50	R+21.3	Jennifer Canady	Rep	Jennifer Canady	Rep
51	R+13.6	Hilary Holley	Rep	Octavio Hernandez	Dem Flip
52	R+38.9	Samantha Scott	Rep	Samantha Scott	Rep
53	R+36.3	Jeff Holcomb†	Rep	Brian Hawkins	Rep
54	R+17.8	Randy Maggard	Rep	Randy Maggard	Rep
55	R+26.9	Vacant		Walter Price	Rep
56	R+27.5	Brad Yeager	Rep	Brad Yeager	Rep
57	R+16.6	Adam Anderson	Rep	Adam Anderson	Rep
58	R+12.1	Kim Berfield	Rep	Kim Berfield	Rep
59	R+16.0	Berny Jacques	Rep	Berny Jacques	Rep
60	D+6.7	Lindsay Cross†	Dem	Lindsay Polega-Quigley	Dem
61	R+8.5	Linda Chaney	Rep	Linda Chaney	Rep
62	D+33.9	Michele Rayner-Goolsby†	Dem	Kyandra Darling	Dem
63	D+41.1	Dianne Hart†	Dem	Jacqueline Coffie-Leeks	Dem
64	R+2.7	Susan Valdes†	Rep (Note: Valdes was initially elected as a Democrat, but switched parties in December 2024.)	Luis Salazar	Dem Flip
65	R+6.3	Karen Gonzalez Pittman	Rep	Karen Gonzalez Pittman	Rep
66	R+12.8	Traci Koster	Rep	Traci Koster	Rep
67	D+10.3	Fentrice Driskell†	Dem	Luis Viera	Dem
68	R+28.6	Lawrence McClure†	Rep	Ryan Gill	Rep
69	R+8.7	Danny Alvarez	Rep	Ashley Herrmann	Dem Flip
70	R+13.6	Michael Owen	Rep	Michael Owen	Rep
71	R+16.2	Will Robinson†	Rep	Jordan Varnadore	Rep
72	R+26.3	Bill Conerly	Rep	Bill Conerly	Rep
73	R+7.2	Fiona McFarland	Rep	Fiona McFarland	Rep
74	R+25.4	James Buchanan†	Rep	Nick Pachota	Rep
75	R+30.6	Danny Nix	Rep	Danny Nix	Rep
76	R+37.0	Vanessa Oliver	Rep	Vanessa Oliver	Rep
77	R+25.8	Tiffany Esposito	Rep	Tiffany Esposito	Rep
78	R+15.1	Vacant		Susan Frantz	Rep
79	R+26.7	Mike Giallombardo	Rep	Mike Giallombardo	Rep
80	R+35.3	Adam Botana	Rep	Adam Botana	Rep
81	R+19.9	Yvette Benarroch	Rep	Yvette Benarroch	Rep
82	R+22.8	Lauren Melo	Rep	Liesa Priddy	Rep
83	R+45.6	Kaylee Tuck	Rep	Kaylee Tuck	Rep
84	R+10.9	Dana Trabulsy	Rep	Dana Trabulsy	Rep
85	R+13.1	Toby Overdorf†	Rep	Anthony Bonna	Rep
86	R+27.6	John Snyder	Rep	John Snyder	Rep
87	R+10.7	Emily Gregory	Dem	Jon Maples	Rep Flip
88	D+37.4	Jervonte Edmonds	Dem	Jervonte Edmonds	Dem
89	D+1.3	Debra Tendrich	Dem	Debra Tendrich	Dem
90	D+10.4	Rob Long	Dem	Rob Long	Dem
91	R+8.5	Peggy Gossett-Seidman	Rep	Peggy Gossett-Seidman	Rep
92	D+7.9	Kelly Skidmore	Dem	Kelly Skidmore	Dem
93	D+1.0	Anne Gerwig	Rep	August Mangeney	Dem Flip
94	R+9.8	Meg Weinberger	Rep	Elizabeth Holmes	Dem Flip
95	D+12.1	Christine Hunschofsky	Dem	Christine Hunschofsky	Dem
96	D+18.9	Dan Daley	Dem	Dan Daley	Dem
97	D+52.1	Lisa Dunkley	Dem	Lisa Dunkley	Dem
98	D+29.7	Mitch Rosenwald	Dem	Mitch Rosenwald	Dem
99	D+44.2	Daryl Campbell	Dem	Daryl Campbell	Dem
100	R+7.7	Chip LaMarca†	Rep	Michael Ferguson	Dem Flip
101	R+2.5	Hillary Cassel	Rep (Note: Cassel was initially elected as a Democrat, but switched parties in December 2024.)	Todd Delmay	Dem Flip
102	D+4.1	Michael Gottlieb†	Dem	Michael Friend	Dem
103	D+16.0	Robin Bartleman	Dem	Robin Bartleman	Dem
104	D+28.2	Felicia Robinson	Dem	Felicia Robinson	Dem
105	D+27.0	Marie Woodson	Dem	Marie Woodson	Dem
106	R+9.0	Fabián Basabe	Rep	Lucia Baez-Geller	Dem Flip
107	D+34.7	Wallace Aristide	Dem	Wallace Aristide	Dem
108	D+46.7	Dotie Joseph†	Dem	Daphne Campbell	Dem
109	D+30.2	Ashley Gantt†	Dem	James Bush III	Dem
110	R+39.5	Tom Fabricio	Rep	Tom Fabricio	Rep
111	R+35.5	David Borrero	Rep	David Borrero	Rep
112	R+45.2	Alex Rizo	Rep	Alex Rizo	Rep
113	R+5.1	Vacant		Gloria Romero Roses	Dem Flip
114	R+10.2	Demi Busatta	Rep	Demi Busatta	Rep
115	R+31.2	Omar Blanco	Rep	Omar Blanco	Rep
116	R+34.3	Vacant		Ashley Perez-Biliskov	Rep
117	D+2.4	Kevin Chambliss	Dem	Kevin Chambliss	Dem
118	R+34.5	Mike Redondo	Rep	Mike Redondo	Rep
119	R+28.3	Juan Carlos Porras	Rep	Juan Carlos Porras	Rep
120	R+20.0	Jim Mooney	Rep	Jim Mooney	Rep

† - Incumbent term-limited, not seeking re-election, or failed to qualify

== Retirements ==
=== Democratic ===
- 13th district: Angie Nixon is retiring to run for the U.S. Senate.
- 21st district: Yvonne Hayes Hinson is retiring.
- 42nd district: Anna Eskamani is term limited and running for Orlando mayor.
- 43rd district: Johanna López is retiring to run for Orange County commission
- 60th district: Lindsay Cross is retiring.
- 62nd district: Michele Rayner is retiring to run for state senate.
- 63rd district: Dianne Hart is term limited.
- 67th district: Fentrice Driskell is term limited and running for state senate.
- 102nd district: Michael Gottlieb is retiring.
- 108th district: Dotie Joseph is term limited and running for governor.
- 109th district: Ashley Gantt is retiring to run for state senate.

=== Republican ===
- 2nd district: Alex Andrade is term limited.
- 6th district: Philip Griffitts is retiring.
- 10th district: Chuck Brannan is term limited.
- 12th district: Wyman Duggan is term limited.
- 31st district: Tyler Sirois is term limited.
- 37th district: Susan Plasencia is retiring.
- 38th district: David Smith is term limited.
- 53rd district: Jeff Holcomb is retiring to run for Hernando County commission.
- 64th district: Susan Valdes is term limited.
- 68th district: Lawrence McClure is term limited.
- 71st district: Will Robinson is term limited.
- 74th district: James Buchanan is term limited and running for state senate.
- 82nd district: Lauren Melo is retiring.
- 85th district: Toby Overdorf is term limited.
- 100th district: Chip LaMarca is term limited.

== Incumbents defeated in general elections ==
=== Republicans ===
1. 22nd district: Chad Johnson (first elected in 2024) lost to Amy Trask.
2. 35th district: Erika Booth (first elected in 2024) lost to Eric Gray.
3. 36th district: Rachel Plakon (first elected in 2022) lost to Darryl Block.
4. 39th district: Doug Bankson (first elected in 2022) lost to Jarod Fox.
5. 51st district: Hilary Holley (first elected in 2026 special) lost to Octavio Hernandez.
6. 69th district: Danny Alvarez (first elected in 2022) lost to Ashley Herrmann.
7. 93rd district: Anne Gerwig (first elected in 2024) lost to August Mangeney.
8. 94th district: Meg Weinberger (first elected in 2024) lost to Elizabeth Holmes.
9. 101st district: Hillary Cassel (first elected in 2022) lost to Todd Delmay.
10. 106th district: Fabián Basabe (first elected in 2022) lost to Lucia Baez-Geller.

=== Democrats ===
1. 87th district: Emily Gregory (first elected in 2026 special) lost to Jon Maples.

== Open seats that parties held ==
=== Republican seats held by Republicans ===
1. 2nd district: Won by Jon Fay.
2. 2nd district: Won by Tricia Berry.
3. 2nd district: Won by Marshall Rawson.
4. 2nd district: Won by Terrance Freeman.

== Crossover seats ==
This is a list of seats that voted for one party in the 2024 presidential election and are currently represented by a member of the opposite party.

=== Democratic ===
Location	Member	Party	First elected	Trump margin of victory in 2024	Incumbent last margin of victory
87th	Emily Gregory	Democratic	2026 (special)	R+10.7	D+2.4

=== Republican ===
Location	Member	Party	First elected	Harris margin of victory in 2024	Incumbent last margin of victory
93rd	Anne Gerwig	Republican	2024	D+1.0	R+0.4

== Predictions ==
Source	Ranking	As of
Sabato's Crystal Ball	Likely R	January 22, 2026
State Navigate	Likely R	September 9, 2026

== Special elections ==
=== District 3 (special) ===
Republican Joel Rudman resigned to run for congress.

Republican primary
Party	Candidate	Votes	%
Republican	Nathan Boyles	8,726	35.85
Republican	Shon Owens	7,768	31.91
Republican	Hayden Hudson	2,562	10.53
Republican	Cynthia Smith	2,099	8.62
Republican	Wade Merritt	1,549	6.36
Republican	Jamie Wells	931	3.82
Republican	Rena McQuaig	411	1.69
Republican	Joshua Shane Sik	294	1.21
Total votes		24,340	100.00

2025 Florida House of Representatives special election, 3rd District
Party	Candidate	Votes	%
Republican	Nathan Boyles	8,176	67.05
Democratic	Dondre Wise	4,017	32.95
Total votes		12,193	100.00
Republican hold			

=== District 32 (special) ===
Republican Debbie Mayfield resigned to run in a state senate special election.

Republican primary
Party	Candidate	Votes	%
Republican	Brian Hodgers	5,642	35.01
Republican	Bob White	5,333	33.10
Republican	Terrence Cronin	5,138	31.89
Total votes		16,113	100.00

2025 Florida House of Representatives special election, 32nd District
Party	Candidate	Votes	%
Republican	Brian Hodgers	14,999	55.30
Democratic	Juan Hinojosa	12,122	44.70
Total votes		27,121	100.00
Republican hold			

=== District 40 (special) ===
Democrat LaVon Bracy Davis resigned to run in a state senate special election.

Democratic primary
Party	Candidate	Votes	%
Democratic	RaShon Young	2,794	55.44
Democratic	Travaris McCurdy	2,246	44.56
Total votes		5,040	100.00

2025 Florida House of Representatives special election, 40th District
Party	Candidate	Votes	%
Democratic	RaShon Young	7,330	75.06
Republican	Tuan Le	2,435	24.94
Total votes		9,765	100.00

=== District 51 (special) ===
Republican Josie Tomkow resigned to run in a state senate special election.

=== District 52 (special) ===
Republican John Temple resigned to become the President of Lake–Sumter State College.

=== District 87 (special) ===
Republican Mike Caruso resigned after being appointed Palm Beach County clerk of the circuit court and comptroller.

Democratic primary
Party	Candidate	Votes	%
Democratic	Emily Gregory	4,568	88.2%
Democratic	Laura Levites	612	11.8%
Total votes		5,180	100%

Republican primary
Party	Candidate	Votes	%
Republican	Jon Maples	5,327	84.4%
Republican	Gretchen Miller	984	15.6%
Total votes		6,311	100%

2026 Florida House of Representatives special election, 87th District
Party	Candidate	Votes	%
Democratic	Emily Gregory	17,113	51.2%
Republican	Jon Maples	16,316	48.8%
Total votes		33,429	100%
Democratic gain from Republican			

=== District 90 (special) ===
Democrat Joseph Casello died.

Republican primary
Party	Candidate	Votes	%
Republican	Maria Zack	1,420	52.99
Republican	Bill Reicherter	1,260	47.01
Total votes		2,680	100.00

2025 Florida House of Representatives special election, 90th District
Party	Candidate	Votes	%
Democratic	Rob Long	9,558	63.18
Republican	Maria Zack	5,425	35.86
Independent	Karen Ching Hsien Yeh Ho	146	0.97
Total votes		15,129	100.00

== Detailed results ==
=== District 1 ===
3rd term incumbent Republican Michelle Salzman had represented the district since 2020.

=== District 2 ===
4th term incumbent Republican Alex Andrade had represented the district since 2018. He is term-limited and cannot seek re-election.

District 2 Republican primary details

==== Candidates ====
- Kevin Brown
- John Fay, retired Naval flight officer
- Melissa Moyer Pusch

=== District 3 ===
1st term incumbent Republican Nathan Boyles has represented the district since winning a special election in 2025.

=== District 4 ===
3rd term incumbent Republican Patt Maney had represented the district since 2020.

=== District 5 ===
2nd term incumbent Republican Shane Abbott had represented the district since 2022.

=== District 6 ===
2nd term incumbent Republican Philip Griffitts had represented the district since 2022.

=== District 7 ===
3rd term incumbent Republican Jason Shoaf had represented the district since winning a special election in 2019.

District 7 Democratic primary details

==== Candidates ====
- John Vellines, bar owner
John Vellines

Organizations

- Vote Common Good

=== District 8 ===
2nd term incumbent Democrat Gallop Franklin had represented the district since 2022.

=== District 9 ===
3rd term incumbent Democrat Allison Tant had represented the district since 2020.

=== District 10 ===
4th term incumbent Republican Chuck Brannan had represented the district since 2018. He is term-limited and cannot seek re-election.

=== District 11 ===
3rd term incumbent Republican Sam Garrison had represented the district since 2022, after being redistricted from the 18th district, which he had represented since 2020.

=== District 12 ===
4th term incumbent Republican Wyman Duggan had represented the district since 2022, after being redistricted from the 15th district, which he had represented since 2018. He is term-limited and cannot seek re-election.

=== District 13 ===
3rd term incumbent Democrat Angie Nixon had represented the district since 2022, after being redistricted from the 14th district, which she had represented since 2020. She is retiring to run for U.S. Senate.

=== District 14 ===
2nd term incumbent Democrat Kimberly Daniels had represented the district since 2022.

=== District 15 ===
2nd term incumbent Republican Dean Black had represented the district since 2022.

=== District 16 ===
2nd term incumbent Republican Kiyan Michael has the district since 2022.

=== District 17 ===
2nd term incumbent Republican Jessica Baker had represented the district since 2022.

=== District 18 ===
1st term incumbent Republican Kim Kendall has represented the district since 2024.

=== District 19 ===
1st term incumbent Republican Sam Greco has represented the district since 2024.

=== District 20 ===
1st term incumbent Republican Judson Sapp has represented the district since 2024.

=== District 21 ===
3rd tern incumbent Democrat Yvonne Hayes Hinson has represented the district since 2022, after being redistrict from the 20th district, which she had represented since 2020. She is not seeking re-election.

=== District 22 ===
1st term incumbent Republican Chad Johnson has represented the district since 2024.

=== District 23 ===
1st term incumbent Republican J.J. Grow has represented the district since 2024.

=== District 24 ===
1st term incumbent Republican Ryan Chamberlin has represented the district since winning a special election in 2023.

=== District 25 ===
2nd term incumbent Republican Taylor Yarkosky has represented the district since 2022.

=== District 26 ===
1st term incumbent Republican Nan Cobb has represented the district since 2024.

=== District 27 ===
1st term incumbent Republican Richard Gentry has represented the district since 2024.

=== District 28 ===
1st term incumbent Republican Bill Partington has represented the district since 2024.

=== District 29 ===
3rd term incumbent Republican Webster Barnaby has represented the district since 2020.

=== District 30 ===
2nd term incumbent Republican Chase Tramont has represented the district since 2022.

=== District 31 ===
4th term incumbent Republican Tyler Sirois has represented the district since 2022, after being redistricted from the 51st district, which he had represented since 2018. He is term-limited and cannot seek re-election.

=== District 32 ===
1st term incumbent Republican Brian Hodgers has represented the district since winning a special election in 2025.

=== District 33 ===
1st term incumbent Republican Monique Miller has represented the district since 2024.

=== District 34 ===
2nd term incumbent Republican Robbie Brackett has represented the district since 2022. He is running for re-election.

=== District 35 ===
1st term incumbent Republican Erika Booth has represented the district since 2024.

District 35 Democratic primary details

==== Candidates ====
- Eric Gray, nonprofit leader and homeless advocate
Eric Gray

Organizations

- Vote Common Good

=== District 36 ===
2nd term incumbent Republican Rachel Plakon has represented the district since 2022.

=== District 37 ===
2nd term incumbent Republican Susan Plasencia has represented the district since 2022. She is retiring.

=== District 38 ===
4th term incumbent Republican David Smith has represented the district since 2018. He is term-limited and cannot seek re-election.

=== District 39 ===
2nd term incumbent Republican Doug Bankson has represented the district since 2022.

=== District 40 ===
2nd term incumbent Democrat LaVon Bracy Davis has represented the district since 2022. On April 10, 2025, Bracy Davis submitted her resignation, effective September 1 of that same year, to run in a state senate special election. A special election for this seat will be held on September 2, 2025.

=== District 41 ===
2nd term incumbent Democrat Bruce Antone has represented the district since 2022.

=== District 42 ===
4th term incumbent Democrat Anna V. Eskamani has represented the district since 2022, after being redistricted from the 47th district, which she had represented since 2018. She is term-limited and cannot seek re-election.

District 42 Democratic primary details

==== Candidates ====
- Felipe Sousa-Lazabellet, immigrant rights activist

==== Endorsements ====
Felipe Sousa-Lazabellet

Organizations

- Run for Something

=== District 43 ===
2nd term incumbent Democrat Johanna López has represented the district since 2022. She is retiring to run for Orange County commission.

District 42 Democratic primary details

==== Candidates ====
- Samuel Vilchez Santiago, Orange County Democratic Party chair

==== Endorsements ====
Samuel Vilchez Santiago

Organizations

- Run for Something

=== District 44 ===
2nd term incumbent Democrat Rita Harris has represented the district since 2022.

=== District 45 ===
1st term incumbent Democrat Leonard Spencer has represented the district since 2024.

=== District 46 ===
1st term incumbent Democrat Jose Alvarez has represented the district since 2024.

=== District 47 ===
2nd term incumbent Republican Paula Stark has represented the district since 2022. She failed to qualify for re-election.

=== District 48 ===
1st term incumbent Republican Jon Albert has represented the district since 2024.

=== District 49 ===
1st term incumbent Republican Jennifer Kincart Jonsson has represented the district since 2024.

=== District 50 ===
2nd term incumbent Republican Jennifer Canady has represented the district since 2022.

=== District 51 ===
4th term incumbent Republican Josie Tomkow has represented the district since 2022, after being redistricted from the 39th district, which she had represented since winning a special election in 2018. She is term-limited and cannot seek re-election.

=== District 52 ===
2nd term incumbent John Temple has represented the district since 2022.

=== District 53 ===
2nd term incumbent Republican Jeff Holcomb has represented the district since 2022. He is retiring to run for Hernando County commission.

=== District 54 ===
3rd term incumbent Republican Randy Maggard has represented the district since 2022, after being redistricted from the 38th district, which he had represented after winning a special election in 2019.

=== District 55 ===
The 55th district is currently vacant after incumbent Republican Kevin Steele resigned on August 7, 2026.

=== District 56 ===
2nd term incumbent Republican Brad Yeager has represented the district since 2022.

=== District 57 ===
2nd term incumbent Republican Adam Anderson has represented the district since 2022.

=== District 58 ===
2nd term incumbent Republican Kim Berfield has represented the district since 2022.

=== District 59 ===
2nd term incumbent Republican Berny Jacques has represented the district since 2022.

=== District 60 ===
2nd term incumbent Democrat Lindsay Cross has represented the district since 2022. She is retiring.

=== District 61 ===
3rd term incumbent Republican Linda Chaney has represented the district since 2020.

=== District 62 ===
3rd term incumbent Democrat Michele Rayner has represented the district since 2022, after being redistricted from the 70th district, which she had represented since 2020. She is retiring to run for state senate.

District 62 Democratic primary details

==== Candidates ====
- Kyandra Darling, former aide to Charlie Crist

Declined

- Darryl Rouson, state senator, former state representative (2008–2016)

==== Endorsements ====
Kyandra Darling

U.S. senators

- Bernie Sanders, Vermont (2007–present) (Independent)

U.S. representatives

- Kathy Castor, FL-14 (2007–present)

Organizations

- Run for Something

=== District 63 ===
4th term incumbent Democrat Dianne Hart has represented the district since 2018. She is term-limited and cannot seek re-election.

=== District 64 ===
4th term incumbent Republican Susan Valdes has represented the district since 2022, after being redistricted from the 62nd district, which she had represented since 2018. She is term-limited and cannot seek re-election.

=== District 65 ===
2nd term incumbent Republican Karen Gonzalez Pittman has represented the district since 2022.

=== District 66 ===
3rd term incumbent Republican Traci Koster has represented the district since 2022, after being redistricted from the 64th district, which she had represented since 2020.

=== District 67 ===
4th term incumbent Democrat Fentrice Driskell, the House Minority Leader, has represented the district since 2018. She is term-limited and cannot seek re-election, and is running for state senate.

=== District 68 ===
4th term incumbent Republican Lawrence McClure has represented the district since 2022, after being redistricted from the 58th district, which he had represented since winning a special election in 2017. He is term-limited and cannot seek re-election.

=== District 69 ===
2nd term incumbent Republican Danny Alvarez has represented the district since 2022.

=== District 70 ===
1st term incumbent Republican Michael Owen has represented the district since 2024.

=== District 71 ===
4th term incumbent Republican Will Robinson has represented the district since 2018. He is term-limited and cannot seek re-election.

=== District 72 ===
1st term incumbent Republican Bill Conerly has represented the district since 2024.

=== District 73 ===
3rd term incumbent Republican Fiona McFarland had represented the district since 2022, after being redistricted from the 72nd district, which she had represented since 2020. She is running for re-election.

=== District 74 ===
4th term incumbent Republican James Buchanan has represented the district since 2018. He is term-limited and cannot seek re-election, and is running for state senate.

=== District 75 ===
1st term incumbent Republican Danny Nix has represented the district since 2024.

=== District 76 ===
1st term incumbent Republican Vanessa Oliver has represented the district since 2024.

=== District 77 ===
2nd term incumbent Republican Tiffany Esposito has represented the district since 2022.

=== District 78 ===
The 78th district is currently vacant, after incumbent Republican Jenna Persons-Mulicka resigned on May 20, 2026 after being appointed Lee County Supervisor of Elections.

=== District 79 ===
3rd term incumbent Republican Mike Giallombardo has represented the district since 2022, after being redistricted from the 77th district, which he had represented since 2020.

=== District 80 ===
3rd term incumbent Republican Adam Botana has represented the district since 2022, after being redistricted from the 76th district, which he had represented since 2020.

=== District 81 ===
1st term incumbent Republican Yvette Benarroch has represented the district since 2024.

=== District 82 ===
3rd term incumbent Republican Lauren Melo has represented the district since 2022, after being redistricted from the 80th district, which she had represented since 2020.

=== District 83 ===
3rd term incumbent Republican Kaylee Tuck has represented the district since 2022, after being redistricted from the 55th district, which she had represented since 2020.

=== District 84 ===
3rd term incumbent Republican Dana Trabulsy has represented the district since 2020.

=== District 85 ===
4th term incumbent Republican Toby Overdorf has represented the district since 2022, after being redistricted from the 83rd district, which he had represented since 2018. He is term-limited and cannot seek re-election.

=== District 86 ===
3rd term incumbent Republican John Snyder has represented the district since 2022, after being redistricted from the 82nd district, which he had represented since 2020.

=== District 87 ===
Incumbent Democrat Emily Gregory has represented the district since winning a special election, and flipping the seat, on March 23, 2026, after Republican Mike Caruso resigned on August 18, 2025.

District 87 Democratic primary details

==== Candidates ====
- Emily Gregory, Incumbent Representative

==== Endorsements ====
Emily Gregory

Organizations

- Run for Something

District 87 Republican primary details

==== Candidates ====
- Jon Maples, former Lake Clarke Shores city councilman and nominee for this district in the 2026 special election
- Jonathan Rubin

==== Polling ====
Poll source	Date(s) administered	Sample size (Note: Key: A – all adults RV – registered voters LV – likely voters V – unclear)	Margin of error	Jon Maples	Jonathan Rubin	Undecided
Inquire LLC	May 26–28, 2026	257 (LV)	± 6.1%	53%	10%	37%

=== District 88 ===
3rd term incumbent Democratic Jervonte Edmonds has represented the district since winning a special election in 2022.

=== District 89 ===
1st term incumbent Democrat Debra Tendrich has represented the district since 2024.

=== District 90 ===
The 90th district is currently vacant, after incumbent Democrat Joseph Casello died of a heart attack on July 18, 2025. A special election was held on December 9, 2025.

District 90 Democratic primary details

==== Candidates ====
- Rob Long, Delray Beach commissioner and nominee in the special election

==== Endorsements ====
Rob Long

State legislators

- Lori Berman, Minority Leader of the Florida Senate
- Joe Casello, incumbent state representative for this district (deceased)
- Tae Edmonds, state representative
- Tina Polsky, state senator
- Kelly Skidmore, state representative
- Debra Tendrich, state representative

Individuals

- Dave Aronberg, former state attorney for the Fifteenth Judicial Circuit Court of Florida (2013–2025)

Organizations

- Run for Something

=== District 91 ===
2nd term incumbent Republican Peggy Gossett-Seidman has represented the district since 2022.

=== District 92 ===
3rd term incumbent Democrat Kelly Skidmore has represented the district since 2022, after being redistricted from the 81st district, which she had represented since 2020.

=== District 93 ===
1st term incumbent Republican Anne Gerwig has represented the district since 2024.

=== District 94 ===
1st term incumbent Republican Meg Weinberger has represented the district since 2024.

=== District 95 ===
3rd term incumbent Democratic Christine Hunschofsky has represented the district since 2022, after being redistricted from the 96th district, which she had represented since 2020.

=== District 96 ===
3rd term incumbent Democrat Dan Daley has represented the district since 2022, after being redistricted from the 97th district, which he had represented since winning a special election in 2019. He is running for re-election.

=== District 97 ===
2nd term incumbent Democrat Lisa Dunkley has represented the district since 2022.

=== District 98 ===
1st term incumbent Democrat Mitch Rosenwald has represented the district since 2024.

=== District 99 ===
2nd term incumbent Democrat Daryl Campbell has represented the district since winning a special election in 2022.

=== District 100 ===
4th term incumbent Republican Chip LaMarca has represented the district since 2018. He is term-limited and cannot seek re-election.

=== District 101 ===
2nd term incumbent Republican Hillary Cassel has represented the district since 2022.

District 101 Republican primary details

==== Republican Primary ====
===== Candidates =====
- Hillary Cassel

District 101 Democratic primary details

==== Democrat Primary ====
===== Candidates =====
- Todd Delmay, Executive Director of Safeguarding American Values for Everyone (SAVE)

====== Endorsements ======
Todd Delmay

State Legislators

- Shevrin D. Jones, SD-34
- Carlos Guillermo Smith, SD-17
- Dan Daley, HD-96
- Frederick Lippman, former HD-100 (1978–1999)
- Michele Rayner, HD-62
- Eleanor Sobel, former SD-31 (2012–2016), SD-33 (2008–2012), HD-99 (2002–2006), and HD-100 (1998–2002)

County Officials

- Marty Kiar, Broward County Property Appraiser
- Steven Anthony Geller, Broward County Commissioner
- Joseph Scott Geller, Miami-Dade County Public School board member

Municipal Officials

- Dean J. Trantalis, Mayor of Fort Lauderdale

Groups

- Dolphin Democrats
- SAVE Florida

=== District 102 ===
4th term incumbent Democrat Michael Gottlieb has represented the district since 2022, after being redistricted from the 98th district, which he had represented since 2018. He is term-limited and cannot seek re-election.

=== District 103 ===
3rd term incumbent Democrat Robin Bartleman has represented the district since 2020.

=== District 104 ===
3rd term incumbent Democrat Felicia Robinson has represented the district since 2022, after being redistricted from the 102nd district, which she had represented since 2020.

=== District 105 ===
3rd term incumbent Democrat Marie Woodson has represented the district since 2022, after being redistricted from the 101st district, which she had represented since 2020.

=== District 106 ===
2nd term incumbent Republican Fabián Basabe had represented the district since 2022.

District 106 Republican primary details

==== Republican Primary ====
===== Candidates =====
- Fabián Basabe, incumbent state representative

===== Endorsements =====
Fabián Basabe

State legislators

- Jose Alvarez, Florida House District 46 representative (Democrat)
- Alex Rizo, Florida House District 112 representative (Republican)

County Officials

- Dariel Fernandez, Miami-Dade County Tax Collector (Republican)

Municipal Officials

- Gustavo Blachman, Aventura Commissioner (Republican)
- Buzzy Skylar, Bal Harbour Village Councilmember (Republican)
- Issac Salver, Mayor of Bay Harbor Islands (Republican)
- Stephanie Bruder, Vice-Mayor of Bay Harbor Islands (Democrat)
- Joshua Fuller, Bay Harbor Islands Councilmember (Democrat)
- Glenn Singer, Mayor of Golden Beach (Republican)
- Judy Lusskin, Vice Mayor of Golden Beach (Republican)
- Bernard Einstein, Golden Beach Councilmember (Republican)
- Kenneth Bernstein, Golden Beach Councilmember (Democrat)
- Jessie Mendal Golden Beach Councilmember (No Party Affiliation)
- Rachel Streitfeld, Mayor of North Bay Village (Democrat)
- Goran Cuk, Vice Mayor of North Bay Village (Republican)
- Richard Chervony, North Bay Village Commissioner (Democrat)
- Doris Acosta, North Bay Village Commissioner(No Party Affiliation)
- Andy Daro, North Bay Village Commissioner (No Party Affiliation)
- Ruben Coto, former Surfside Commissioner (Republican)
- Jeniffer Viscarra, Vice Mayor of Sunny Isles Beach (No Party Affiliation)
- Alex Lama, Sunny Isles Beach Commissioner (Republican)
- Fabiola Stuyvesant, Sunny Isles Beach Commissioner (Republican)
- Dana Goldman, former Mayor of Sunny Isles Beach (Republican)

Individual

- Robert "Raven" Kraft, Miami Beach runner
- Elaine Lancaster, drag performer

District 106 Democratic primary details

===== Candidates =====
- Lucia Báez-Geller, former Miami-Dade County Public Schools District 3 Board Member
- Ashley Litwin Diego, lawyer

==== Endorsement ====
Lucia Báez-Geller

State legislators

- Shevrin Jones, Florida State Senator District 34 (Democrat)
- Ashley Viola Gantt, Florida State Representative District 109 (Democrat)

County legislators

- Joe Geller, Miami-Dade County Public Schools Board Member District 3 & former Bay Harbor Islands Town Attorney (Democrat)
- Sarah Leonardi, Broward County Public School Board Member District 3 (Democrat)

Municipal officials

- Javier Fernandez, Mayor of South Miami (Democrat)
- Michael Joseph, Mayor of North Miami (Democrat)
- Tanya Katzoff Bhatt, Miami Beach Commissioner Group 4 (Democrat)

Individuals

- Donna Edna Shalala, former United States Representative Florida District 27 (Democrat)
- Annette Joanne Taddeo-Goldstein, former Florida State Senator District 40 (Democrat)
- Elaine Bloom, former Florida State Representative District 100, 104, & 106 and former Florida House Speaker pro tempore (Democrat)
- Scott Galvin, former North Miami Councilmember District 1 (Democrat)
- Jose Smith, former North Miami Beach Attorney, former Miami Beach Attorney, and former Miami Beach Commissioner (Democrat)
- Manny Diaz, former Mayor of Miami & former Chair of the Florida Democratic Party (Democrat)
- David Richardson, former Miami Beach Commissioner & former Florida House of Representative District 113. (Democrat)

Groups

- SAVE
- Teamsters Local Union 769
Ashley Litwin Diego

County officials

- Daniella Levine Cava, mayor of Miami-Dade County

Municipal officials

- Kassandra Timothe, Vice Mayor of North Miami (Democrat)

Individuals

- Daniel Saul Gelber, former Mayor of Miami Beach (2017-2023), former congressman of the Florida House District 106 (2000-2008) and Florida Senate District 35 (2008-2010) (Democrat)
- Joe Garcia, former Florida U.S. House Representative for District 26 (2013-2015) & former member of the Florida Public Service Commission (Democrat)
- Brent Latham, former mayor of North Bay Village & St. Petersburg (Democrat)
- Mike Grieco, former Miami Beach City Commissioner & former Florida House of Representative District 113 (Democrat)

=== District 107 ===
1st term incumbent Democrat Wallace Aristide has represented the district since 2024.

=== District 108 ===
4th term incumbent Democrat Dotie Joseph has represented the district since 2018. She is term-limited and cannot seek re-election.

=== District 109 ===
2nd term incumbent Democratic Ashley Gantt had represented the district since 2022. She is retiring to run for State Senate.

=== District 110 ===
3rd term incumbent Republican Tom Fabricio has represented the district since 2022, after being redistricted from the 103rd district, which he had represented since 2020.

=== District 111 ===
3rd term incumbent Republican David Borrero has represented the district since 2022, after being redistricted from the 105th district, which he had represented since 2020.

=== District 112 ===
3rd term incumbent Republican Alex Rizo has represented the district since 2022, after being redistricted from the 110th district, which he had represented since 2020.

=== District 113 ===
The 113th district is currently vacant after incumbent Republican Vicki Lopez resigned on November 18, 2025 after being appointed to the Miami-Dade County Commission.

=== District 114 ===
3rd term incumbent Republican Demi Busatta has represented the district since 2020.

=== District 115 ===
1st term incumbent Republican Omar Blanco has represented the district since 2024.

=== District 116 ===
The 116th district is currently vacant after incumbent Republican Daniel Perez, the Speaker of the Florida House of Representatives, resigned on August 21, 2026 after being confirmed as United States Ambassador to Brazil.

=== District 117 ===
3rd term incumbent Democratic Kevin Chambliss has represented the district since 2020.

=== District 118 ===
1st term incumbent Republican Mike Redondo has represented the district since winning a special election in 2023.

=== District 119 ===
2nd term incumbent Republican Juan Carlos Porras has represented the district since 2022.

=== District 120 ===
3rd term incumbent Republican Jim Mooney has represented the district since 2020.

== See also ==
- 2026 Florida elections
  - 2026 Florida Senate election
  - 2026 United States House of Representatives elections in Florida
- List of Florida state legislatures
