= 2014 Florida House of Representatives election =

- November 4, 2014

All 120 seats in the Florida House of Representatives 61 seats needed for a majority
- Turnout: 28.03% ▼11.63 pp
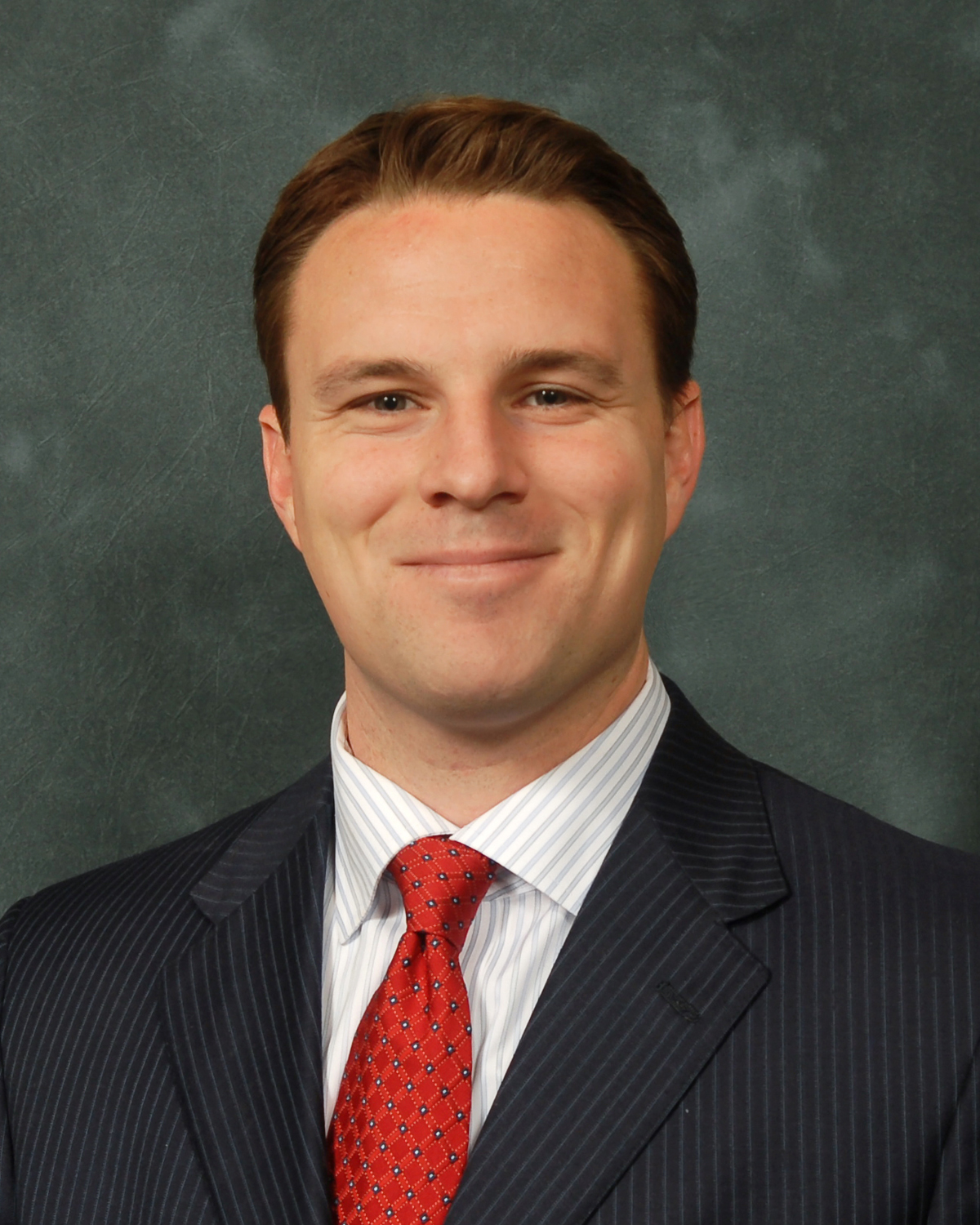

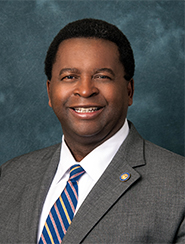
	Majority party	Minority party
Leader	Will Weatherford	Perry Thurston
Party	Republican	Democratic
Leader since	November 20, 2012	November 20, 2012
Leader's seat	38th-Dade City	94th-Fort Lauderdale
Last election	76	44
Seats before	75	45
Seats won	81 (Note: House district 64 results were rejected because of legal issues regarding the Republican primary held on election day. House district 13 didn't have an election due to incumbent Reggie Fullwood not qualifying for the ballot because of improperly filed paperwork. Both seats were filled by special elections in 2015.)	39
Seat change	▲6	▼6
Popular vote	1,943,999	1,276,388
Percentage	58.11%	38.15%
- Results: Republican gain Republican hold Democratic hold No election held/results rejected
Speaker before election
Will Weatherford
Republican
Elected Speaker
Steve Crisafulli
Republican

The 2014 Florida House of Representatives election took place on November 4, 2014 to elect representatives from all 120 districts. The election coincided with the election of the other house of the Legislature, the Senate.

The Republican Party of Florida won a majority of seats, remaining the majority party, followed by the Florida Democratic Party.

== Predictions ==
Source	Ranking	As of
Governing	Safe R	October 20, 2014

== Results ==
Party	Votes		Seats		
Party	No.	%	No.	+/−	%
Republican Party of Florida	1,943,999	58.11	81	+6	67.55
Florida Democratic Party	1,276,388	38.15	39	−6	30.83
Independent	81,646	1.38	0	0	0.00
Libertarian Party of Florida	38,275	0.32	0	0	0.00
Independent Party of Florida	2,262	0.32	0	0	0.00
Green Party of Florida	1,606	0.05	0	0	0.00
Write-in	1,447	0.04	0	0	0.00
Total	5,906,926	100.00	134	±0	100.00
Source: Florida Divisions of Elections

Popular vote
Republican	58.11%
Democratic	38.15%
Other	1.11%

House seats
Republican	67.55%
Democratic	30.83%

== Members elected ==
District	Member elected	Party
1		
2		
3		
4		
5		
6		
7		
8		
9		
10		
11		
12		
13		
14		
15		
16		
17		
18		
19		
20		
21		
22		
23		
24		
25		
26		
27		
28		
29		
30		
31		
32		
33		
34		
35		
36		
37		
38		
39		
40		
41		
42	Mike LaRosa	Republican
43		
44		
45		
46		
47		
48		
49		
50		
51		
52		
53		
54		
55		
56		
57		
58		
59		
60		
61		
62		
63		
64		
65		
66		
67		
68		
69		
70		
71		
72		
73		
74		
75		
76		
77		
78		
79		
80		
81		
82		
83		
84		
85		
86		
87		
88		
89		
90		
91		
92		
93		
94		
95		
96		
97		
98		
99		
100		
101		
102		
103		
104		
105		
106		
107		
108		
109		
110		
111		
112		
113		
114		
115		
116		
117		
118		
119		
120		
