= Joe Geller =

American politician

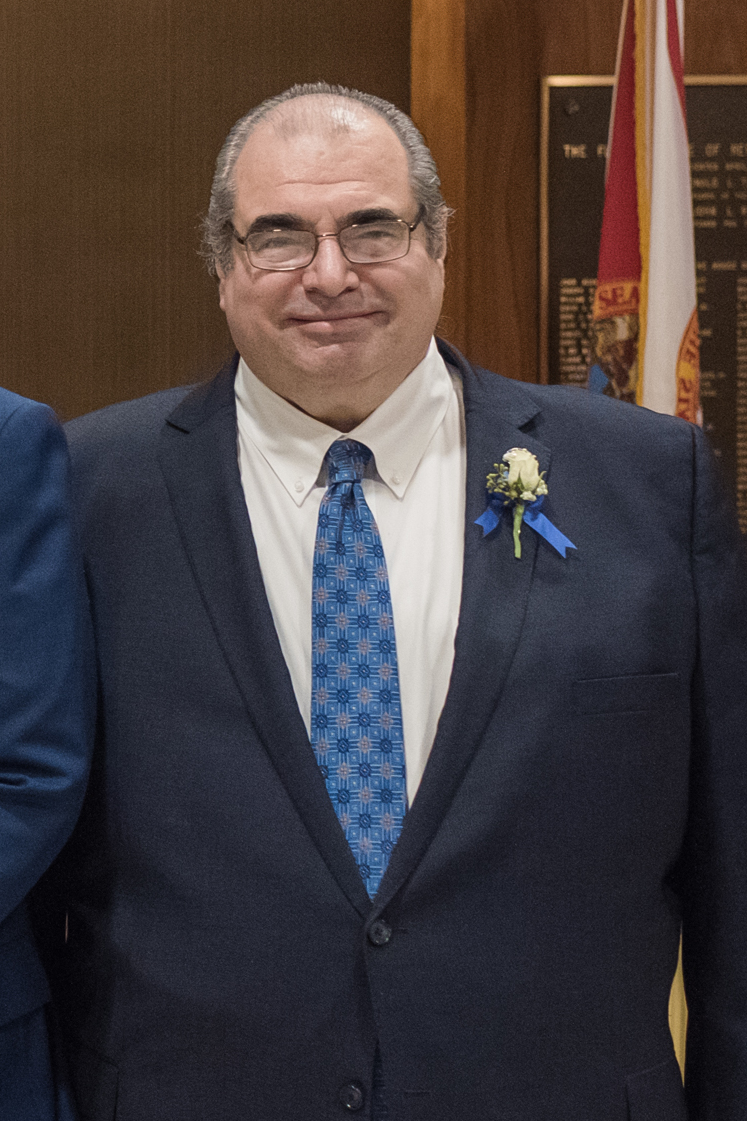

Miami-Dade County Public Schools Board Member
- Incumbent
- Assumed office November 19, 2024
- Preceded by: Lucia Baez-Geller

Member of the Florida House of Representatives from the 100th district
- In office November 4, 2014 – November 8, 2022
- Preceded by: Joseph Gibbons

Mayor of North Bay Village, Florida
- In office 2004–2008

Town and Village Attorney
- In office 1995–2018
- Constituency: Golden Beach (1999–2000); Miami Lakes (2011–2013); El Portal (1995–1997, 2000–2018)

City Attorney
- In office 2003–2010
- Constituency: North Bay Village (2003, 2009–2010); Opa-Locka (2008, 2009–2015)

Personal details
- Born: Joseph Scott Geller; March 7, 1954 (age 72) New York City, U.S.
- Party: Democratic
- Spouse: Betty Geller
- Children: 3
- Education: Northwestern University; Florida State University (BA); Florida State University College of Law (JD)
- Profession: Attorney

Joseph Scott Geller (born March 7, 1954) is a Democratic politician who currently serves as a board member of the Miami-Dade County Public Schools from the 3rd District and previously served as a member of the Florida House of Representatives, representing the 100th District, which includes most of Hollywood in southern Broward County and parts of Miami-Dade County, from 2014 to 2022.

== History ==
Geller was born in The Bronx in New York City in 1954, and moved to the state of Florida in 1965. He attended Northwestern University, but did not graduate, instead receiving his bachelor's degree in history from the Florida State University in 1975. After graduation, Geller then attended the Florida State University College of Law, receiving his Juris Doctor in 1979.

In 1989, he was elected the Chairman of the Miami-Dade County Democratic Party, serving in that capacity in 2000. During the 2000 presidential election, he played a prominent role as an attorney for the Al Gore presidential campaign. During the recount, Geller, seeking to confirm a theory that some Gore voters had accidentally punched the wrong hole in their ballots, requested a sample ballot from the Supervisor of Elections' office. After receiving the ballot from a clerk, Geller was accused of stealing a ballot, was mobbed by protesters, and had to be escorted to safety by police. "I requested [the sample ballot], which I'm entitled to do," Geller said. "It was clearly marked 'sample ballot for use by Democratic Party.' The whole transaction was out in the open and all very calmly done. This Republican observer — a woman with blond hair, a suit and clipboard — was watching the whole thing. But the moment I started to walk away, she sicced the crowd on me. She said I was stealing a ballot and they surrounded me. It was all orchestrated."

Geller ran for Mayor of North Bay Village, a small city in northeastern Miami-Dade County, in 2004. He faced Frank DiMaggio and was able to win narrowly, receiving 54% of the vote to DiMaggio's 46%.

== Florida House of Representatives ==
When incumbent State Representative Dan Gelber was unable to seek re-election due to term limits in 2008, Geller ran to succeed him in the 106th District, which stretched from Fisher Island to Golden Beach in eastern Miami-Dade County. He faced Richard L. Steinberg in the Democratic primary, and he lost to Steinberg handily, receiving only 31% of the vote to Steinberg's 69%.

In 2014, incumbent State Representative Joseph Gibbons was unable to seek re-election in the 100th District, so Geller ran in the Democratic primary to replace him, declaring, "My style is to be a consensus builder to build bridges between people. I’m a progressive. And I make no bones about being a progressive. But I have also lived in other parts of the state. I think I can do some good up there. I think I can make a difference. I think I can make this a better state." He faced teacher John Paul Alvarez and pastor Ben Sorenson in the Democratic primary, and earned the endorsement of the Miami Herald, which praised him as a candidate who "knows this bi-county district well," and noted that the district "stands to benefit from his legislative priorities." Ultimately, Geller defeated his opponents handily, receiving 62% of the vote to Sorensen's 20% and Alvarez's 18%. In the general election, Geller faced fellow attorney Marty Feigenbaum and once again earned the endorsement of the Herald, which said that he was "thoroughly familiar with the issues."

In April 2022, Geller argued that the effort to repeal the Reedy Creek Improvement Act was "disrespectful of the legislative process."

== School Board Member ==
In 2024, Geller ran for Miami-Dade County Public Schools's third district to succeed Lucia Baez-Geller, who did not run for re-election to run for state representative in the Florida's 27th congressional district. Geller faced off against former school board member Martin Karp and received multiple endorsements, including the Miami Herald, who considered him the stronger candidate and noted Karp's lax oversight of after-school programs, the United Teachers of Dade, as well as outgoing board member Lucia Baez-Geller, who called Geller a "champion for public education in Tallahassee" in her endorsement. Geller won the seat against Karp in the general election with 55% of the vote.
