= Elizabeth Holmes (politician) =

American politician

Member of the Florida House of Representatives from the 94th district
- Incumbent
- Assumed office November 3, 2026
- Preceded by: Meg Weinberger

Personal details
- Party: Democratic
- Website: Campaign website

Elizabeth Holmes is an American politician. A member of the Democratic Party, she has served in the Florida House of Representatives since 2026, representing the 94th district. She unseated incumbent Republican Meg Weinberger at the 2026 election. She is a schoolteacher by profession.
