= Jarod Fox =

American politician

Member of the Florida House of Representatives from the 39th district
- Incumbent
- Assumed office November 3, 2026
- Preceded by: Doug Bankson

Personal details
- Party: Democratic
- Website: Campaign website

Jarod Fox is an American politician. A member of the Democratic Party, he has served in the Florida House of Representatives since 2026, representing the 39th district. He unseated incumbent Republican Doug Bankson in the 2026 election. He is a physician by profession.
