= Amy Trask (politician) =

American politician

Member of the Florida House of Representatives from the 22nd district
- Incumbent
- Assumed office November 3, 2026
- Preceded by: Chad Johnson

Personal details
- Party: Democratic
- Website: Campaign website

Amy Trask is an American politician. A member of the Democratic Party, she has served in the Florida House of Representatives since 2026, representing the 22nd district. She unseated incumbent Republican Chad Johnson at the 2026 election.
