= Rick Roth =

American politician from Florida

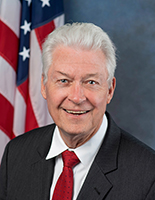

Member of the Florida House of Representatives
- In office November 8, 2016 – November 8, 2024
- Preceded by: Patrick Rooney Jr.
- Succeeded by: Meg Weinberger
- Constituency: 85th district (2016–2022); 94th district (2022–2024)

Personal details
- Born: November 21, 1952 (age 73) West Palm Beach, Florida, U.S.
- Party: Republican
- Education: Emory University
- Website: rickroth.org

Rick Roth (born November 21, 1952) was a Republican member of the Florida Legislature representing the state's 85th House district, which includes part of Palm Beach County.

== Florida House of Representatives ==
Roth defeated Andrew Watt in the August 30, 2016 Republican primary, winning 62% of the vote. In the November 8, 2016 general election, Roth won 57.7% of the vote, defeating Democrat Robert Simeone.

Roth was reelected in 2018, defeating Democrat Ellen Baker with 54.61% of the vote in the November 6, 2018 general election.
