= Dolphin Democrats =

American LGBTQ political organization

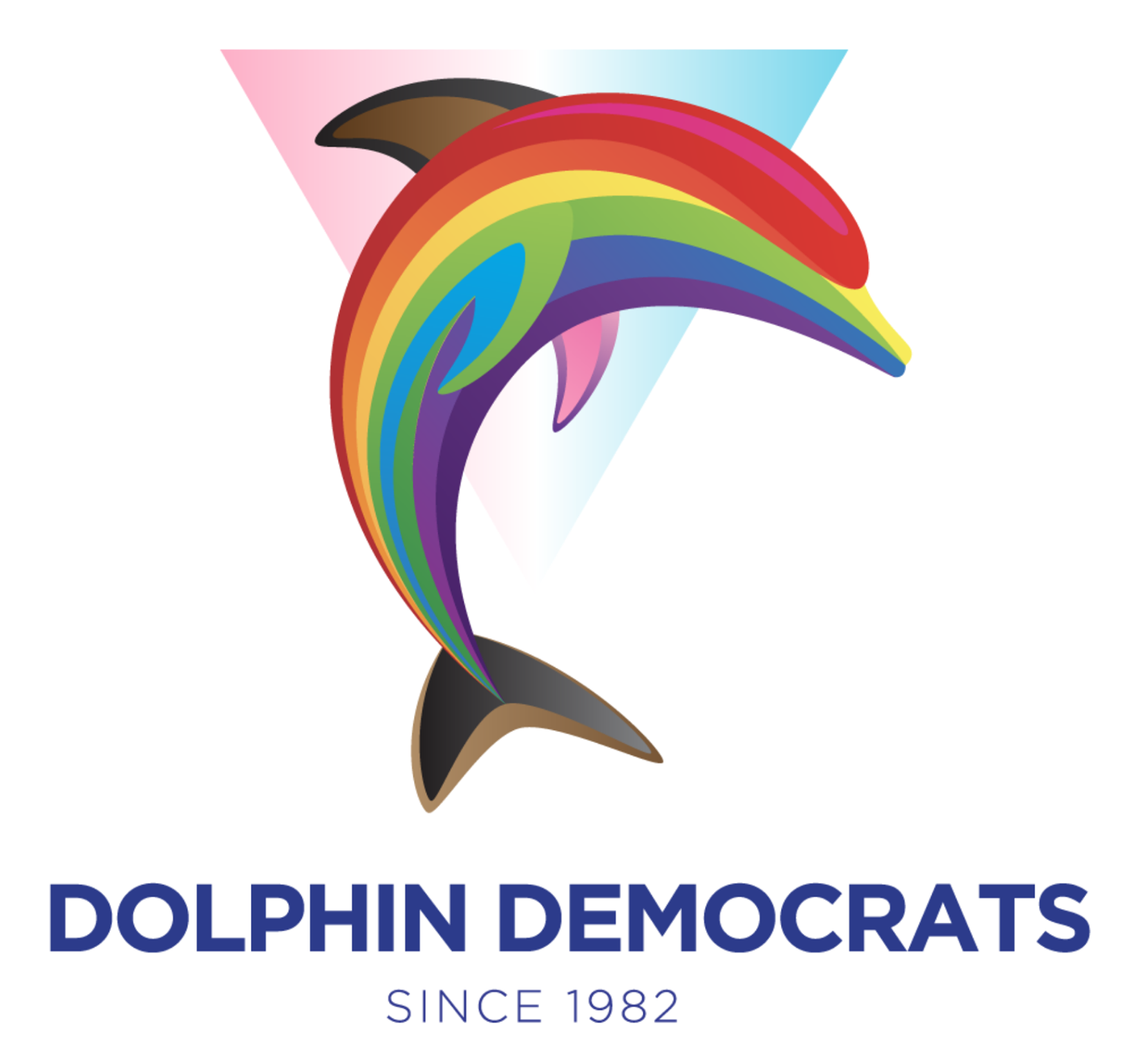
- Abbreviation: Dolphin Dems
- Formation: 1982; 44 years ago
- Type: Political action committee, political club, caucus
- Headquarters: Wilton Manors, Florida, U.S.
- Region served: South Florida
- Members: ~500 (2026)
- Key people: Alfredo Olvera, President
- Affiliations: Florida Democratic Party, Stonewall Democrats
- Website: DolphinDems.org

Dolphin Democrats (Dolphin Dems) is an American political action organization based in Broward County, Florida, United States. Founded in 1982, it is the oldest LGBTQ+ political organization in the State of Florida. The caucus operates as a chartered affiliate of the Florida Democratic Party and the Florida LGBTQ+ Democratic Caucus.

== History ==
The Dolphin Democrats were established in 1982 in Fort Lauderdale, Florida, to promote LGBTQ rights and elect pro-LGBTQ Democratic candidates. The organization is a licensed chapter of the Stonewall Democrats. Members and leaders of the Dolphin Democrats have served as delegates to the Democratic National Convention. According to the Sun Sentinel, the "group has become so influential that its political influence is now coveted by straight politicians."

The Dolphin Democrats host an annual gala dinner and presented the "Harvey Milk Leadership Award" to Carlos Smith in 2023. They host their monthly meeting at The Pride Center at Equality Park.

In June 2026, Congresswoman Debbie Wasserman Schultz spoke at the annual Dolphin Democrats Pride Month gala.

== Leadership ==
The Dolphin Democrats function as a membership-based political club governed by an elected Board of Directors. The organization operates under bylaws sanctioned by the Florida Democratic Party. As of 2026, the president of the Dolphin Democrats is Alfredo Olvera, an Ecuadorian American immigrant and activist.

Sabrina Javellana, a notable victim of deepfake pornography, served as president of the Dolphin Democrats from October 2023 to February 2024, following the resignation of Todd Delmay.

== Political activity ==
Dolphin Democrats GOTV Center in Wilton Manors, September 2026.

The Dolphin Democrats endorse Democratic Party candidates for local political offices across South Florida, including in Broward, Palm Beach, Miami-Dade, Monore, and Collier counties. The organization operates a political action committee (PAC) through which it disburses campaign contributions. The Dolphin Dems endorsed Gregory Tony for sheriff of Broward County in 2024. The organization endorsed Jared Moskowitz, Shevrin Jones, and Pia Dandiya for U.S. Congress in 2026. The group endorsed Lauren Book for the 30th district of the Florida Senate in 2026. They also endorsed Michael Ferguson for the 100th district and Todd Delmay for the 101st district of the Florida House of Representatives in 2026.

The Dolphin Democrats advocate against measures they deem harmful to the LGBTQ+ community, such as the Florida Parental Rights in Education Act ("Don't Say Gay") and restrictions on gender-affirming care.

== Notable members ==
- Todd Delmay, member of the Florida House of Representatives and former Dolphin Democrats president
- Dean Trantalis, 42nd mayor of Fort Lauderdale and former Dolphin Democrats president

== See also ==
- Equality Florida
- Justice Democrats
- Alice B. Toklas LGBTQ Democratic Club
