= Lucia Baez-Geller =

American politician (born 1980s)

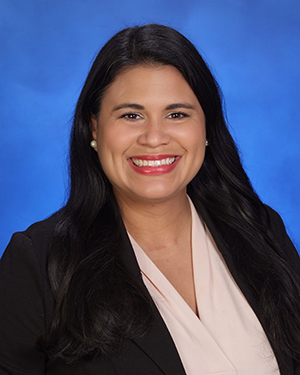

Member-elect of the Florida House of Representatives from the 106th district
- Assuming office January 2027
- Succeeding: Fabián Basabe

Personal details
- Party: Democratic

Lucia Baez-Geller (born 1982/1983) is an American politician. She is the Democratic member-elect of the Florida House of Representatives from the 106th district. Prior to her victory, she was a member of the Miami-Dade County School Board, as well as the Democratic candidate in the 2024 congressional election for Florida's 27th district.

== Biography ==
Lucia Baez-Geller was born in 1982 or 1983 to a Cuban father and Colombian mother, and raised in a single-mother household. She obtained a bachelor's degree in English and secondary education from Spring Hill College in 2005, a master of science in English education from Nova Southeastern University, and an education specialist degree in curriculum and instruction from Florida International University.

In 2005, Baez-Geller started working as a teacher at Miami Beach Senior High School, teaching language arts. She ran in the 2020 Miami-Dade County School Board election for District 3 to replace retiring incumbent Martin Karp, receiving endorsements from Donna Shalala, Annette Taddeo and the Miami-Dade Democratic Party. She headed to a runoff after no candidate received a majority vote in the August 2020 election, which she later won in November 2020, defeating fellow Miami Beach Senior High teacher Russ Rywell.

In 2024, Baez-Geller ran in the congressional election for Florida's 27th district, at the time held by Republican María Elvira Salazar, with the endorsement of Debbie Mucarsel-Powell and Taddeo. She had a financial advantage over Salazar, having almost ten times as much campaign money as her. She won the primary election in August 2024, winning the Democratic nomination. She lost the general election to Salazar in November 2020.

Baez-Geller ran in the 2026 Florida House of Representatives election in the 106th district against Fabián Basabe, who was at the time facing sexual misconduct allegations, including a $450,000 civil judgement from some of his former staffers. Despite the Republican voting advantage in the district, which President Donald Trump had won only two years earlier, a significant section of registered voters were independents. She defeated Basabe in the general election.

Baez-Geller is married to Jewish-American David Geller; the couple held a Catholic-Jewish mixed-faith wedding for their marriage.
