= Hillary Cassel =

American politician

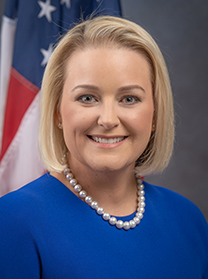

Member of the Florida House of Representatives from the 101st district
- In office November 8, 2022 – November 3, 2026
- Preceded by: Marie Woodson
- Succeeded by: Todd Delmay

Personal details
- Born: Hillary Paige Brisson Boynton Beach, Florida, U.S.
- Party: Democratic (before 2024); Republican (2024–present)
- Spouse: Michael A. Cassel
- Children: 1
- Education: Florida State University (BS); Nova Southeastern University (JD)

Hillary B. Cassel is an American attorney and politician who was a member of the Florida House of Representatives for the 101st district from 2022 to 2026. Formerly a Democrat, she changed her party affiliation to Republican one month after winning re-election in 2024.

== Education ==
Cassel earned a Bachelor of Science in political science and government from Florida State University in 2003 and a Juris Doctor from the Shepard Broad College of Law. While in law school, Cassel served as an editor on the Nova Law Review, was Chief Advocate of the Moot Court Honor Society, was a member of the Order of the Barristers, and earned the "Best Advocate" award from the National Institute for Trial Advocacy, among other distinctions.

== Career ==
From 2006 to 2009, Cassel served as an assistant state attorney in the 17th Circuit State Attorney's Office. From 2010 to 2013, she was an associate at Berk, Merchant, & Sims. She then worked as a senior associate at an insurance defense firm from 2012 to 2014. It was at this time that she met her husband and law partner, Michael. She was then a partner at Geyer Fuxa Tyler from 2014 to 2017 before establishing Cassel & Cassel in 2017.

Despite her freshman legislator status, Cassel was placed in the spotlight by the Democratic Caucus during the 2022 special session related to the Florida property insurance market due to her expertise in the subject matter. Cassel presented closing arguments in both the commerce committee as an ex officio member and floor debate during the house session on behalf of the caucus. She further provided closing remarks during the post-session press conference along with House Minority Leader Fentrice Driskell. Less than 24 hours after Cassel spoke to Insurance Commissioner David Altmaier's role in the insurance legislation passed during the special session, Mr. Altmaier resigned as Florida's Insurance Commissioner.

On December 27, 2024, Cassel announced that she was leaving the Democratic Party in favor of the Republican Party, citing the former's "failure to unequivocally support Israel" in the Gaza war.

Cassel was unseated in the 2026 election.
