= Kyandra Darling =

American politician

Member-elect of the Florida House of Representatives from the 62nd district
- Assuming office November 3, 2026
- Succeeding: Michele Rayner

Personal details
- Party: Democratic

Kyandra Darling is an American politician. A member of the Democratic Party, she is the member-elect for the 62nd district of the Florida House of Representatives.
