= Todd Delmay =

American politician

- Official portrait, 2026

Member of the Florida House of Representatives from the 101st district
- Incumbent
- Assumed office November 3, 2026
- Preceded by: Hillary Cassel

Personal details
- Born: September 24, 1971 (age 55) Fremont, Michigan, U.S.
- Party: Democratic
- Spouse: Jeff Delmay (m. 2015)
- Children: 1
- Education: Hope College (BS); Strayer University (MBA)
- Website: Campaign website

Todd Delmay (born September 24, 1971) is an American politician and nonprofit executive serving as a Democratic Party member of the Florida House of Representatives, representing the 101st district since 2026.

== Early life and education ==
Delmay was born on September 24, 1971, in Fremont, Michigan. He graduated from Hope College with his bachelor's degrees in Theatre and German in 1994. He later earned his Master of Business Administration from Strayer University in 2014.

== Career ==
Delmay served as President of the Dolphin Democrats from February 2023 to October 2023. He later worked as Executive Director of SAVE Florida.

== Florida House of Representatives (2026–present) ==
Delmay was elected to the Florida House of Representatives from the 101st district in the 2026 election, unseating Democrat-turned-Republican incumbent Hillary Cassel.

== Personal life ==
Delmay is openly LGBTQ. He moved to Florida in 1996.

On January 4, 2015, Delmay married his husband, Jeff, becoming the first gay men to legally marry in the history of Florida. The couple have one son.
