= Michael Grieco =

American politician from Florida

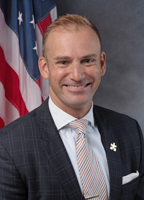

Member of the Florida House of Representatives from the 113th district
- In office November 6, 2018 – November 8, 2022
- Preceded by: David Richardson
- Succeeded by: Fabián Basabe (redistricting)

Member of the Miami Beach City Commission from the 2nd district
- In office November 20, 2013 – October 24, 2017
- Preceded by: Jorge Exposito
- Succeeded by: Mark Samuelian

Personal details
- Born: Michael Christopher Grieco; September 21, 1975 (age 51) New York City, New York
- Party: Democratic
- Education: American University (BA); University of Miami (JD)

Michael Christopher Grieco (born September 21, 1975) is an American attorney and politician. A Democrat, Grieco served in the Florida House of Representatives from 2018 to 2022, representing the 113th district.

== Early life and education ==
Grieco was born in New York City on September 21, 1975, and was raised on Long Island. He attended American University in Washington, D.C., receiving a bachelor of arts degree in 1997. In the same year, Grieco moved to Florida in order to attend the University of Miami, where he received a juris doctor degree in 1999.

== Early career ==
After having been accepted into the Florida Bar, Grieco began his career as an assistant state attorney of Miami-Dade County, serving under Katherine Fernandez Rundle.

In 2006, Grieco moved to Miami Beach and began his own private practice as a criminal defense attorney, founding the law firm Michael Grieco Law Center.

In June 2008, the Florida Supreme Court publicly reprimanded him in case No. SC08-1135 for misrepresenting his role to detectives and obtaining nonpublic information during an assault investigation while serving as an assistant state attorney.

== Political career ==
=== Miami Beach city commissioner ===
In 2013, Grieco ran for the Miami Beach city commission, running in District 2 against incumbent Jorge Exposito. In the nonpartisan primary held on November 5, 2013, Grieco received 35% of the vote, placing second behind Exposito, who received 45% of the vote. However, since no candidate received a majority of the vote, a runoff election was held on November 19, 2013, in which Grieco narrowly defeated Exposito, receiving 54% of the vote to Exposito's 46%.

=== Campaign for Miami Beach mayor, 2017 ===
In 2017, Grieco ran for mayor of Miami Beach to replace term-limited mayor Philip Levine. Greico was an early frontrunner, alongside former state senator Dan Gelber. However, on June 6, 2017, the Miami Herald reported that a political action committee named People for Better Leaders raised over $200,000 for the mayoral election. Grieco initially denied any association with the PAC, and called the Miami Herald investigation fake news; when confronted by reporters, Grieco vehemently stated, "You can look right into my soul," while denying the allegations. However, the PAC was found to be tied to him via his handwriting on documents, and a string of donors, including high-profile Miami Beach vendors, developers, and lobbyists, who testified that Grieco solicited their donations. The PAC was founded and led by Brian Abraham, a Coral Gables strip club manager, and Brian George, a bankrupted accountant, both associates of Grieco. Rundle, the Miami-Dade state attorney, began a criminal corruption probe regarding Grieco's association with the PAC.

In late July 2017, Grieco dropped out of the mayoral election, opting instead to run for re-election to the city commission. However, on September 25, Grieco dropped his bid for re-election as well. During the investigation, prosecutors discovered that one of the people who donated to Grieco's PAC was Petter Hagland, a Norwegian millionaire who donated $25,000 to the PAC. The donation, made in the name of Tony Rodriguez-Tellaheche, a Miami Beach realtor and Grieco associate, violated both Florida law, which makes it illegal to donate money to a political campaign in another person's name, and federal campaign finance law, which disallows foreign nationals from financially contributing to American elections.

On October 27, 2017, Grieco resigned from the Miami Beach city commission. Later that day, he appeared in court and pleaded no contest to the misdemeanor charge of violating campaign finance law. Judge Samuel Slom sentenced Grieco to 1 year of probation, barred him from holding elected office during his probation period, and ordered him to pay a fine of $6,000. On May 1, 2018, Grieco's probation was terminated 6 months early.

=== Florida state representative ===
On May 4, 2018, just three days after the end of his probation, Grieco announced his candidacy for the 113th district in the Florida House of Representatives, seeking to replace retiring Democrat David Richardson. Grieco easily defeated Republican J. P. Parker, a lawyer, in the general election receiving 62% of the vote to Parker's 38.

In May 2020, allegations arose that while serving as the defense attorney for Quinton Dunbar, a Seattle Seahawks cornerback, regarding an armed robbery charge, Grieco allegedly paid off the victims and witnesses. Grieco denied these allegations, and the Miramar Police Department and the Florida Department of Law Enforcement began an investigation regarding the alleged witness tampering. Both agencies found no clear evidence that Grieco had paid off the victims. However, in July 2020, the Florida Bar opened an investigation into Grieco regarding both the witness tampering allegations and the previous campaign finance charge, which could lead to Grieco being disbarred.

Grieco ran for re-election in 2020, and won a second term unopposed.

=== Campaign for State Senate ===
On November 14, Grieco filed to run for Senate District 37 likely going against incumbent Ileana Garcia. The district will shrink to cover only a portion of Miami-Dade County's coast, including parts of Miami, Miami Beach, Coral Gables, Sweetwater and West Miami. On June 1, Grieco posted on social media that he was dropping out of the race for SD-37 citing a lack of funds from various organizations and a reluctance from these groups to back his campaign. Grieco also stated he would not run for another term for his house seat.

=== Campaign for Miami Beach mayor, 2023 ===
In 2023, Grieco made a second attempt to become the Mayor of Miami Beach, after his first run in 2017. However, he was unsuccessful in the mayoral race, receiving about 20% of the vote. During his campaign, Grieco faced criticism for his past campaign finance scandal and a 90-day suspension recommendation for his law license. Furthermore, Grieco's campaign was also affected by the revelation of a recent incident in 2023 where he left a loaded gun unattended at a local park, as well as a 2020 incident where his gun went missing from a rental car.

=== Law license suspension ===
In The Florida Bar v. Michael Christopher Grieco (No. SC2020-1118), decided per curiam on June 27, 2024, the Florida Supreme Court unanimously suspended Grieco's law license for one year—effective 30 days after the filing of the opinion—to allow him to close his practice and protect existing clients. The court approved the referee's findings that Grieco pled no contest to a first-degree misdemeanor under section 106.08(7)(a), Florida Statutes, for accepting a $25,000 campaign contribution from a foreign national through a straw donor, and found that this conduct reflected adversely on his honesty and trustworthiness in violation of Rules Regulating The Florida Bar 3–4.3 and 4–8.4(b). It also held that Grieco made repeated false or misleading statements denying any involvement with the political committee People for Better Leaders during his 2017 Miami Beach mayoral campaign, in violation of Rule 4–8.4(c). The Court emphasized Grieco's “continuous shifting of the narrative,” initially denying any role with the committee, then asserting a confidential attorney-client relationship without correcting the public record, as evidence of deceptive intent. After the forensic handwriting report linked his handwriting to committee documents, Grieco's counsel changed his official position “depending on the audience to whom it is presented” without any public correction. The Court found that Grieco's reliance on technically accurate yet misleading statements demonstrated a “troubling character flaw” necessitating rehabilitation before readmission. In assessing discipline, the Court agreed with the referee's finding of seven aggravating factors—prior disciplinary offenses, dishonest motive, pattern of misconduct, multiple offenses, submission of false evidence, refusal to acknowledge wrongful conduct, and substantial experience in practice—while recognizing mitigation from seventeen witnesses testifying to his good works. It concluded that the severity and persistence of his dishonest conduct outweighed mitigating evidence, warranting a harsher sanction than the referee's 90-day suspension recommendation. Comparing analogous cases, the Court noted that one-year suspensions had been imposed where attorneys lied under oath or misrepresented facts to courts, and that Grieco's repeated dishonesty and prior discipline justified a similar sanction. The suspension bars Grieco from accepting new clients and may be lifted upon timely petition for reinstatement after one year, subject to a court's determination of his fitness to practice law. The Court also criticized the referee's reliance on admonishment standards for negligent dishonesty, holding that Grieco's intentional misleading statements required the suspension subdivisions of Standards 5.1 and 8.1.
