= Nik Dean =

American politician

Member of the Florida House of Representatives from the 28th district
- Incumbent
- Assumed office November 3, 2026
- Preceded by: David Smith

Personal details
- Party: Democratic
- Website: Campaign website

Nik Dean is an American politician. A member of the Democratic Party, he has served in the Florida House of Representatives since 2026, representing the 28th district. Dean is an attorney.
