= Brian Hawkins =

Brian Hawkins is a state legislator in Florida. A Republican, he was elected to the Florida House of Representatives in 2026. He chaired the Hernando County Commission. He succeeds Jeff Holcomb in the Florida House.

Hawkins served in the U.S. Navy.
