= Shevrin Jones =

American educator and politician (born 1983)

Shev Jones
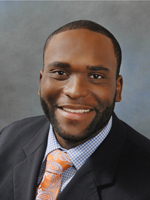
- Official portrait, 2013

Member of the Florida Senate
- In office November 3, 2020 – November 3, 2026
- Preceded by: Oscar Braynon
- Succeeded by: Ashley Gantt
- Constituency: 35th district (2020–2022); 34th district (2022–2026)

Member of the Florida House of Representatives
- In office November 6, 2012 – November 3, 2020
- Preceded by: Redistricted
- Succeeded by: Marie Woodson
- Constituency: 35th district (2020–2022); 101st district (2012–2020)

Personal details
- Born: October 12, 1983 (age 43) Miami Gardens, Florida, U.S.
- Party: Democratic
- Spouse: Quinten Jones
- Education: Florida A&M University (BS); Florida Atlantic University (MEd)
- Website: State Senate website

Shevrin D. "Shev" Jones (born October 12, 1983) is an American educator and politician who served as a member of the Florida Senate from the 34th district from 2022 to 2026. A progressive member of the Democratic Party, he previously represented the 35th district from 2020 to 2022 and served in the Florida House of Representatives from 2012 to 2020, representing the 101st district.

== Early life ==
Jones was born in Miami Gardens, Florida. He attended Florida A&M University, where he earned a Bachelor of Science degree in biochemistry and molecular biology in 2006.

After graduating, Jones returned to South Florida and worked as an educator, including teaching Advanced Placement chemistry in Broward County Public Schools. He later earned a Master of Education degree from Florida Atlantic University in 2017.

== Broward County Commission Campaign ==
In 2010, Jones ran for the Broward County Commission in District 8. He finished third in the Democratic primary behind Barbara Sharief and Angelo Castillo.

== Florida House of Representatives ==
Following redistricting in 2012, Jones ran for the newly created 101st district in the Florida House of Representatives, which included parts of Broward County.

After the withdrawal of other candidates, Jones was elected unopposed in both the Democratic primary and the general election. He was subsequently reelected without opposition until reaching term limits in 2020.

During his tenure in the House, Jones served in Democratic caucus leadership positions, including Democratic Deputy Whip from 2017 to 2018 and Deputy Democratic Leader from 2018 to 2020.

== Florida Senate ==
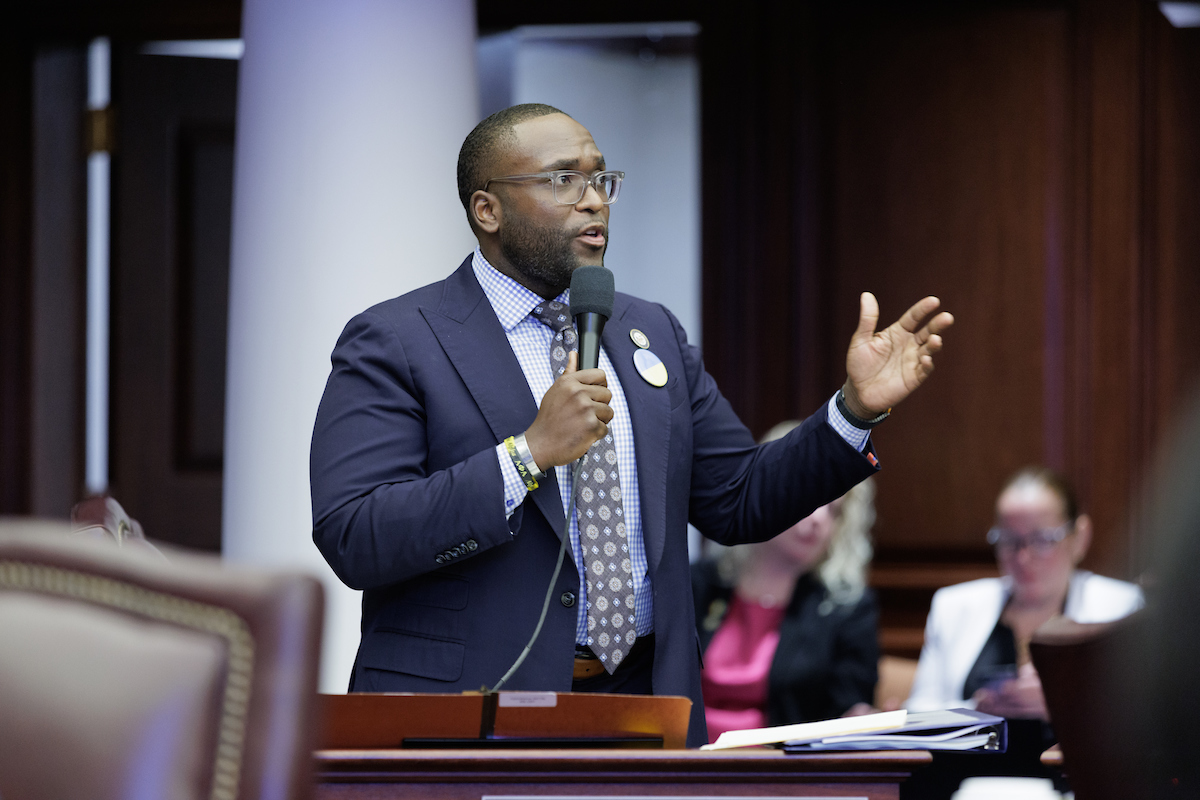
Senator Shevrin Jones speaking during the Florida 2022 Legislative Session

In 2020, Jones ran for Florida Senate District 35 to succeed term-limited Senator Oscar Braynon.

He defeated several candidates in the Democratic primary, including former state senator Daphne Campbell, state representative Barbara Watson and former state representative Cynthia Stafford.

Jones faced no Republican opposition in the general election and took office in November 2020.

Following redistricting in 2022, Jones was elected to represent the 34th district.

As of the 2024–2026 legislative term, Jones serves as vice chair of the Senate Rules Committee and sits on several committees, including Finance and Tax, Fiscal Policy, Transportation, and Education Postsecondary.

Following his decision to run for Congress instead of re-election, Jones completed his term on November 3, 2026, succeeded by Ashley Gantt.

=== Committee Assignments (2024-2026) ===
- Rules (Vice Chair)
- Appropriations Committee on Pre-K - 12 Education
- Community Affairs
- Education Postsecondary
- Finance and Tax
- Fiscal Policy
- Military and Veterans Affairs, Space, and Domestic Security
- Transportation

In November 2026, Jones announced his candidacy for the 37th district of the Florida Senate in 2028, receiving the endorsements of Congressman Jared Moskowitz and former Representative Angie Nixon.

== 2026 U.S. House of Representatives campaign ==
Following the retirement of incumbent Rep. Frederica Wilson, Jones announced his candidacy for the U.S. House of Representatives in Florida's 24th congressional district. In the primary election for the Democratic nomination, Jones faced Miami-Dade County Commissioner Oliver Gilbert, Kendrick Meek Jr.—son of Kendrick Meek—and four others. In August 2026, mass text messages were sent to residents of the district falsely claiming Jones was HIV-positive; the texts were sent from a group impersonating Equality Florida in "violation of federal law." On August 18, 2026, Jones narrowly lost the Democratic nomination to Gilbert, receiving 32% of the vote. During the campaign, Jones was endorsed by Rep. Robert Garcia, Ritchie Torres, Greg Casar, Maxwell Frost, Pramila Jayapal, Property Appraiser Marty Kiar, NFL quarterback Teddy Bridgewater, numerous members of the Florida Legislature, the Congressional Progressive Caucus, Equality Florida, and the Dolphin Democrats.

== Personal life ==
In 2016, Jones underwent emergency spinal surgery after suffering a serious injury during a workout. He later recovered after rehabilitation and physical therapy.

In 2018, Jones publicly came out as gay while serving in the Florida House of Representatives. He became the first openly LGBTQ Black lawmaker in the Florida Legislature.

His father, pastor Eric H. Jones, served as mayor of West Park, Florida from 2005 until 2020. His nephew, Derrick Jones Jr., was elected to the West Park City Commission in 2026.
