= Luis Salazar (politician) =

American politician

Luis Salazar is a state legislator in Florida. A Democrat, he was elected for the 64th ditrict in 2026 over Republican Dan Weldon. Salazar served in the U.S. Navy.

In the Florida House of Representatives, he represents part of Hillsborough County, Florida including a section of West Tampa. He was convicted of Driving Under the Influence three times.
