= Alex Andrade =

American politician from Florida

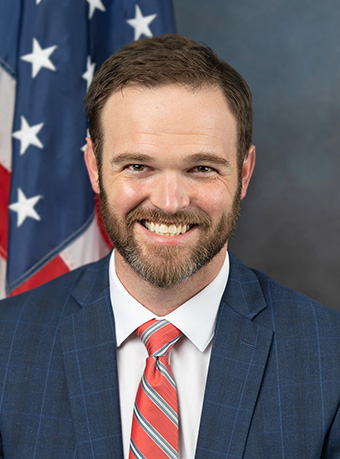
- Official portrait, 2021

Member of the Florida House of Representatives from the 2nd district
- In office November 6, 2018 – November 3, 2026
- Preceded by: Frank White
- Succeeded by: Jon Fay

Personal details
- Born: Robert Alexander Andrade; July 22, 1989 (age 37) George Town, Cayman Islands
- Party: Republican
- Spouse: Jessica Clements
- Education: University of Florida (BS, JD)

Robert Alexander Andrade (born July 22, 1989) is a Republican member of the Florida Legislature representing the state's 2nd House district, which includes parts of Escambia and Santa Rosa counties, from 2018 to 2026.

== Education ==
Andrade attended St. Thomas Aquinas High School. After high school, Andrade graduated in 2011 from the University of Florida with a Bachelor of Science in Advertising from the College of Journalism and Communications. While at the University of Florida, Andrade competed with the UF Trial Team.

After graduating, Andrade returned to the University of Florida and graduated in 2013 from the Fredric G. Levin College of Law with a Juris Doctor degree. While at Levin College of Law, Andrade served as President of the Trial Team and Chief Justice of the UF Supreme Court. Andrade was a member of Florida Blue Key. In 2014, he was inducted into the University of Florida Hall of Fame.

== Career ==
After completing his Juris Doctor in 2013, Andrade served as a gubernatorial fellow in Governor Rick Scott's administration. During this time, Andrade served the legislative affairs office of the Department of Transportation. At the conclusion of the fellowship, Andrade received the Governor Jeb Bush Award for Outstanding Achievement by writing a policy proposal entitled Losing “The Campaign” Why Florida Could Save Money and Increase Charitable Giving by Eliminating the Middleman. This policy laid out extensive groundwork to improve Florida's involvement with charitable organizations and non-profits. Andrade also spent time working in the State Attorney's office as a Certified Legal Intern, helping to prosecute domestic violence.

In 2014, Andrade joined Moore, Hill & Westmoreland, P.A. where he works on cases dealing with Civil Litigation, Real Property, and Commercial Litigation. During this time, Andrade served as an adjunct professor at the University of West Florida and continues to serve on the Legal Studies Advisory Board.

In 2017, Florida Governor Rick Scott appointed Andrade to serve on the Judicial Nominating Commission for the 1st Circuit Court of Florida. He was reappointed by Florida Governor Ron DeSantis in 2019.

=== Elected office ===
Andrade is a Republican member of the Florida Legislature representing the state's 2nd House District, which includes parts of Escambia and Santa Rosa counties. Andrade was first elected to serve Florida House District 2 in 2018 at the age of 29. In 2020, 2022 and 2024, Andrade was reelected to the same office.

In 2020, the Santa Rosa County Legislative Delegation voted to appoint Andrade as the Chair of the Santa Rosa County Delegation. Andrade continues to serve as the Chair of the Santa Rosa County Legislative Delegation as of 2023. In 2023, State Senator Doug Broxson nominated Andrade to serve as the Chair of the Escambia County Legislative Delegation as well.

Andrade currently serves as the Chair of the Infrastructure & Tourism Appropriations Subcommittee and as a member of the following committees: Appropriations Committee, Infrastructure Strategies Committee, Transportation & Modals Subcommittee, Joint Legislative Budget Commission, Rules Committee, and the Select Committee on Health Innovation. Andrade previously served a leadership role in the Education & Employment Committee, where he was the Republican whip for education policy.

In 2020, Andrade was credited with renaming the Pensacola Bay Bridge after Gen. Daniel "Chappie" James Jr. after Rep. Mike Hill failed to pass the same proposal.

In 2020, Andrade introduced a bill to reform Florida's alimony litigation process. In 2023, a similar bill was passed and signed by Governor DeSantis.

In 2021, during a special session addressing the COVID vaccine mandates introduced by the Joe Biden administration, Andrade introduced a bill to remove the power of Florida's government to vaccinate individuals by force. Andrade was quoted as saying the purpose of the special session was to provide “a voice to people who feel powerless in the face of government overreach.” The bill became law in 2021.

In February 2023, Andrade introduced a bill that would overhaul Florida's libel and defamation laws. The bill would reclassify any anonymous source quoted in a publication to "presumptively false" for the purpose of defamation lawsuits, and would prevent journalists from using a statutory privilege to avoid testifying in a lawsuit involving their own publication. The bill would also prevent people who accuse another of discriminating based on "race, sex, sexual orientation, or gender identity" from using a person's religious beliefs as evidence that someone engaged in discrimination. The Foundation for Individual Rights and Expression, a free speech advocacy group, sharply condemned Andrade's bill.

In 2023, Andrade introduced a bill to prevent state resources from being used by diversity, equity and inclusion ("DEI") programs at Florida public universities and to eliminate DEI requirements from hiring and admission standards. The Foundation for Individual Rights and Expression describes DEI as a threat to free speech on college campuses. The bill became law in 2023.

In 2023, the University of Florida Alumni Association named Andrade to its 40 Gators Under 40; a list of the 40 most outstanding alumni under 40 years old.

=== Hope Florida Foundation Investigation ===
In 2025, while serving as the chair of the Florida House's Healthcare Budget Subcommittee, Andrade led an investigation into the transfer of $10,000,000 in Medicaid funds from a Medicaid settlement to the Hope Florida Foundation. The funds were ultimately transferred to a political committee controlled by James Uthmeier, Governor DeSantis's then chief of staff.

Andrade has alleged that the flow of funds from the foundation to the nonprofits and on to the political committees amounts to "conspiracy to commit money laundering and wire fraud."

Andrade's investigation led to high profile resignations of the program's executive director and the opening of a criminal investigation. The investigation has been described as one of the biggest political scandals of DeSantis's time in office, and is cited as the reason DeSantis's wife Casey DeSantis decided not to run for Governor of Florida in 2026.

=== Community involvement ===
- Escambia County Bar Association
- Onbikes Pensacola, Inc., Founding member
- Big Brothers Big Sisters of Northwest Florida
- Leadership Pensacola, Graduate
- Greater Pensacola Chamber of Commerce, Former Policy Committee Chairman

== Elections ==
Andrade defeated Greg Merk August 28, 2018 in an open primary, winning 60.5% of the vote.

Andrade defeated Cris Dosev on August 18, 2020 in the Republican primary, winning 62.1% of the vote. In the general election in 2020, Andrade defeated Democrat Dianne Krumel with 55.8% of the vote.

Andrade defeated Greg Litton and Jordan Karr on August 23, 2022 in the Republican primary, winning 65% of the vote. Andrade went on to beat Carollyn Taylor in the general election with 64% of the vote.

Andrade ran for re-election in 2024, beating his two opponents, Democrat Halley Morrissette and NPA Kim Kline, winning 58% of the vote, compared to 35% for Morrissette 7% for Kline.

== Personal life ==
Andrade has been married to Jessica Clements since 2012. The two have one child together.

As of 2021, Andrade was a friend of Matt Gaetz and was one of a small number of political figures to continue to support Gaetz after he was accused of child sex trafficking.

== Awards ==
- Florida Politics named Andrade a "winner" of Florida's 2020 Legislative Session, citing high profile and controversial bills Andrade sponsored.
- President's Award Recipient for Onbikes Pensacola, Florida Bar Young Lawyers Division
- Best Rising Leader, Inweekly Best of the Coast, 2017
- Florida Gubernatorial Fellowship's Governor Jeb Bush Award for Outstanding Achievement, 2014
- Escambia Santa Rosa Bar Association, Bill Meador Public Service Award
- Florida Policy Institute 2019 Champion for Children Award Recipient
- Florida Chamber of Commerce Honor Roll 2019
- Associated Builders & Contractors of Florida "Legislator of the Year" 2019
- Runner Up Best Politician, Inweekly Best of the Coast, 2019
- Runner Up Best Politician, Inweekly Best of the Coast, 2020
- Champion of Florida Public Broadcasting, 2022
