= Tricia Berry =

American politician

Member of the Florida House of Representatives from the 6th district
- Incumbent
- Assumed office November 3, 2026
- Preceded by: Philip Griffitts

Personal details
- Party: Republican
- Website: Campaign website

Tricia Berry is an American politician. A member of the Republican Party, she has served in the Florida House of Representatives since 2026, representing the 6th district. She is the first woman elected in the district.
