= Richard L. Steinberg =

American politician

Richard Steinberg
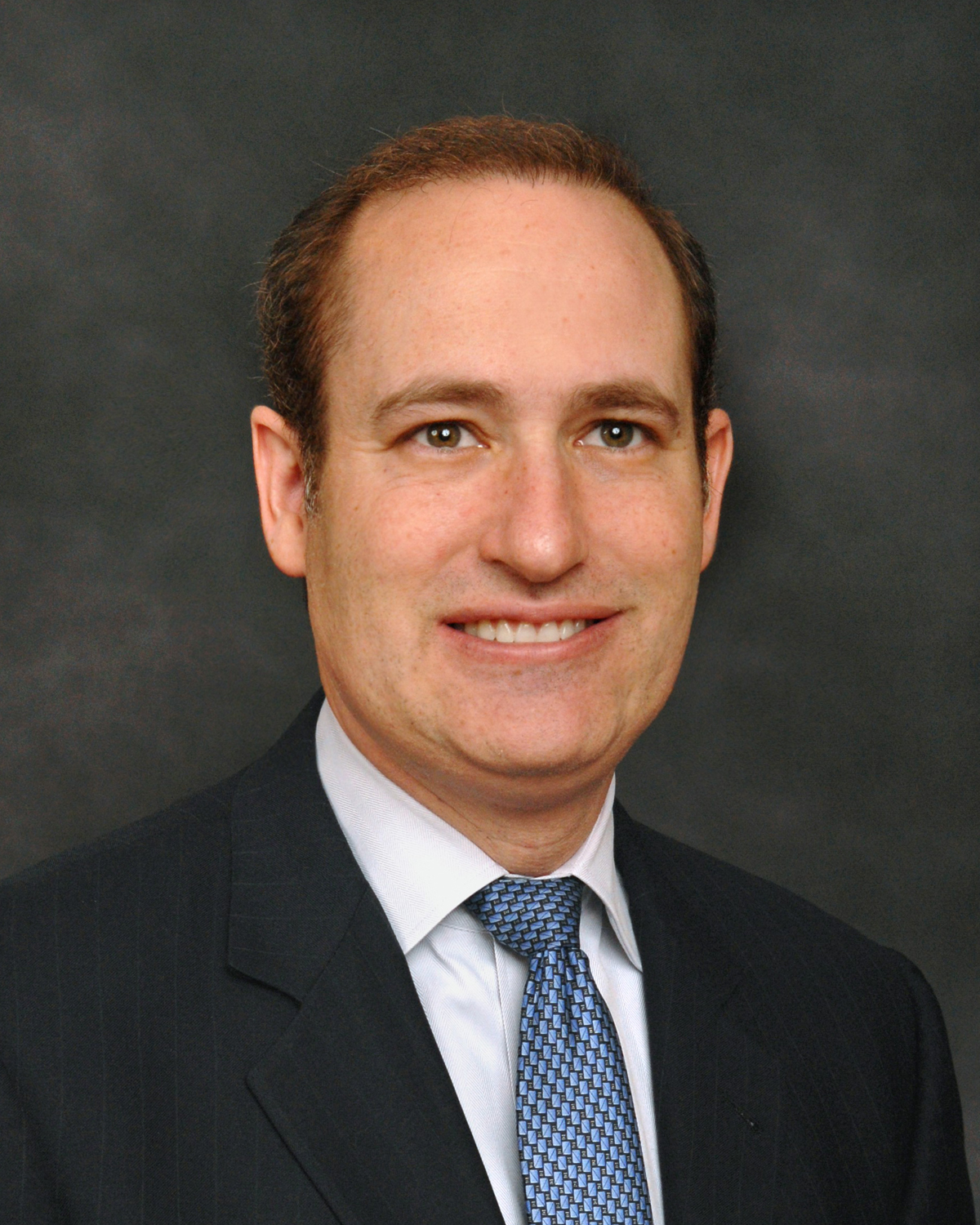

Member of the Florida House of Representatives from the 106th district
- In office November 4, 2008 – February 24, 2012
- Preceded by: Dan Gelber
- Succeeded by: Redistricted

Member of the Miami Beach Commission
- In office 2001–2008
- Succeeded by: Victor Diaz

Personal details
- Born: Richard Lawrence Steinberg; December 23, 1972 (age 53) Miami Beach, Florida
- Party: Democratic
- Spouse: Micky Ross-Steinberg
- Children: 2
- Education: University of Florida (BS); University of Miami (JD, MBA)

Richard Lawrence Steinberg (born December 23, 1972) is an American politician and lawyer from Florida. He is a member of the Democratic Party and was a member of the Florida House of Representatives from 2008 until his resignation in February 2012.

== Education and family ==
Steinberg received his bachelor's degree in Business Administration from the University of Florida in 1994. He went on to receive his master's degree in Business Administration and Juris Doctor degree from the University of Miami School of Law in 1998.

His father, Paul Steinberg, served in the Florida Legislature in the 1970s and '80s. Steinberg's wife, Micky, was elected to the Miami Beach city commission in 2013.

== Political career ==
Steinberg's political career began in 2001, when he was elected to the Miami Beach city commission. He was the second-youngest city commissioner ever elected.

He was elected to the Florida House in 2008, from a district encompassing parts of coastal northeastern Miami-Dade County.

In 2012, the Miami Herald reported that Steinberg was being investigated by the Secret Service for sending anonymous sexting messages to an Assistant U.S. Attorney. He resigned in February 2012, shortly after the Secret Service investigation became public.

The investigation was closed in November 2012, with prosecutors saying they could not prove that Steinberg acted in a 'malicious' way.

== Legal career ==
He has practiced law with Steinberg & Associates, P.A. since 1998.

== Personal life ==
He and his wife Micky have two children.
