= Matt Woodside =

American politician

Member of the Florida House of Representatives from the 31st district
- Incumbent
- Assumed office November 3, 2026
- Preceded by: Tyler Sirois

Personal details
- Born: Brevard County, Florida
- Party: Republican
- Website: Campaign website

Matt Woodside is an American politician. A member of the Republican Party, he has served in the Florida House of Representatives since 2026, representing the 31st district. He was born and raised in Brevard County. He is an educator.
