= Jon Fay =

American businessman and politician

Member of the Florida House of Representatives from the 2nd district
- Incumbent
- Assumed office November 3, 2026
- Preceded by: Alex Andrade

Personal details
- Party: Republican

Military service
- Allegiance: United States
- Branch/service: United States Navy
- Rank: Commander

Jon Fay is an American businessman, politician, and former Navy officer who is Member of the Florida House of Representatives from the 2nd district since 2026.
