= Lindsay Polega-Quigley =

American politician, lawyer

Lindsay Polega-Quigley is a lawyer and state legislator in Florida. A Democrat, she was elected to the Florida House of Representatives in 2026 and represents part of St. Petersburg and Pinellas Park. She represents District 60.
