= Chad Johnson (politician) =

American politician

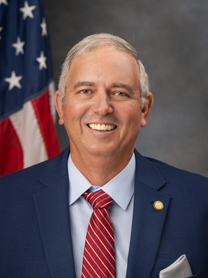

Member of the Florida House of Representatives from the 22nd district
- Incumbent
- Assumed office January 8, 2025
- Preceded by: Chuck Clemons

Personal details
- Born: Gainesville, Florida, U.S.
- Party: Republican
- Website: https://johnsonforflorida.com/

Chad Johnson is an American politician and member of the Florida House of Representatives since 2024 from the 22nd district. He is a former county commissioner.
