= North Bay Village, Florida =

- City
- City of North Bay Village
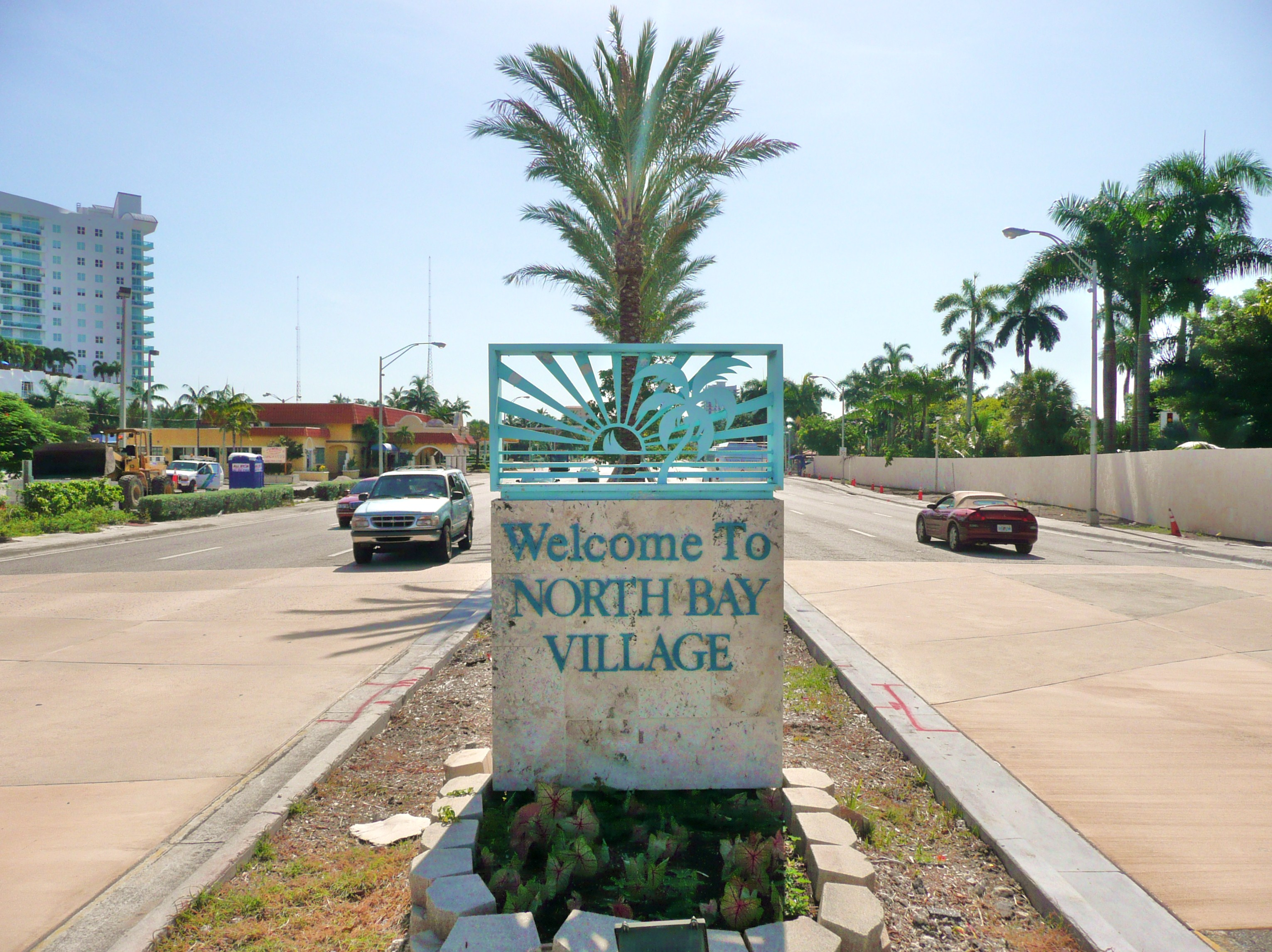
- Entrance to North Bay Village on eastbound Kennedy Causeway

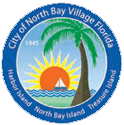
- Seal
- Motto: The Heart of the Bay
- Location in Miami-Dade County and the state of Florida

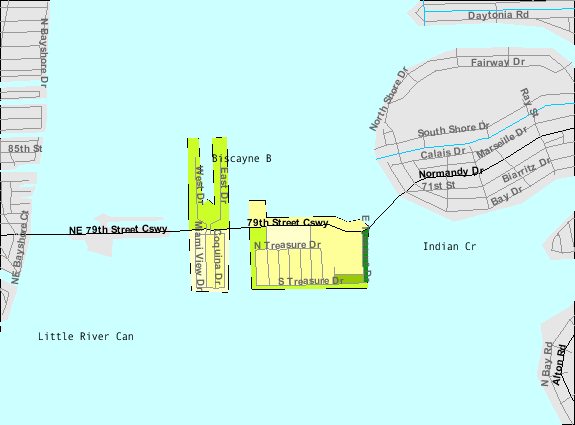
- U.S. Census Bureau map showing city limits
- Coordinates: 25°50′55″N 80°09′13″W
- Country: United States
- State: Florida
- County: Miami-Dade
- Incorporated: August 1, 1945

Government
  - Type: Council-Manager

Area
  - City: 0.81 sq mi (2.11 km^{2})
  - Land: 0.37 sq mi (0.96 km^{2})
  - Water: 0.45 sq mi (1.16 km^{2}) 60.31%
- Elevation: 3 ft (0.91 m)

Population (2020)
  - City: 8,159
  - Density: 22,067.6/sq mi (8,520.33/km^{2})
  - Metro: 5,422,200
- Time zone: UTC-5 (EST)
  - Summer (DST): UTC-4 (EDT)
- Zip Code: 33141
- Area codes: 305, 786, 645
- FIPS code: 12-49225
- GNIS feature ID: 2404390
- Website: North Bay Village Florida

North Bay Village is a city located in Miami-Dade County, Florida. The city is part of the Miami metropolitan area of South Florida. As of the 2020 census, the city had a total population of 8,159.

== Geography ==
According to the United States Census Bureau, the city has a total area of 0.837 square miles (2.17 km^{2}). 0.3322 square miles (0.860 km^{2}) of it is land and 0.5048 square miles (1.307 km^{2}) of it is water. The total area is 60.31% water. The city consists of three islands; Harbor Island, North Bay Island and Treasure Island. The islands are located in Biscayne Bay between Miami and Miami Beach along the 79th Street Causeway.

== Surrounding areas ==
- Biscayne Bay
- Biscayne Bay Biscayne Bay
- Biscayne Bay, Miami Biscayne Bay, Miami Beach
- Biscayne Bay Biscayne Bay
- Biscayne Bay

== History ==
=== Early years ===
Prior to 1940, most of what is now North Bay Village lay beneath the waters of Biscayne Bay. The only dry land was Broadcast Key, a 5-acre (20,000 m^{2}) island from which pioneer radio station WIOD began broadcasting in 1926.

Today, television station WSVN-TV maintains its headquarters at this same site, now joined with Treasure Island. WIOD moved inland during the mid-2010s.

In 1940, dredging and bulk-heading created North Bay Island. By 1941, palm-lined streets had been laid out, and 12 homes had been built and occupied. Today, the island has grown into a neighborhood of single-family residences.

During the mid-1940s, dredging and filling created Harbor Island and Treasure Island. Harbor Island is composed primarily of multi-family buildings. Treasure Island, whose street names were drawn from Robert Louis Stevenson's novel Treasure Island, is a mixture of single-family dwellings on the westerly end and multi-family dwellings on the eastern end.

=== 1945–2022 ===
North Bay Village was incorporated in 1945. Harbor and Treasure Islands were annexed several years later. Broadcast Key, also known as Cameo Island, was annexed in 1963. During its early years, North Bay Village was primarily a haven for winter residents.

The City became widely known for its popular restaurants and nightclubs, which attracted celebrities like Frank Sinatra and Judy Garland. Dean Martin had a nightclub in North Bay Village in the late 1960s and early 1970s called Dean Martin's Pub. It was next to Jilly Rizzo's club, Jilly's South, where interior scenes of Porky's strip club scenes were filmed.

Most of today's residents live in the village year-round.

Most construction in North Bay Village since the year 2000 has been in the development of high-rise luxury condominium buildings such as the 360 condominium, Space 01 Condo, Eloquence on the Bay, and Grandview Palace Marina.

=== 2023–present ===
A new developments are underway such as 7918 West Ave and Shoma Bay (which will include a Publix on the ground floor) Other residential and mixed-used construction projects by Sunbeam (Channel 7), Continuum Village, 7940 West Ave, 7915 West Ave are planned to be in development soon. The city has also made exciting public-private development agreements with Argentine Futbol Association (AFA) to build a local soccer academy and dramatically improve the public fields at Treasure Island Elementary. Further development of The Island Walk has begun; The Island Walk is a pedestrian walkway that will span over 2 miles along the city's waterfront.

In 2025, 500 ft (152 meter) buildings were proposed on the north side of the island as part of the 45 storey Harbor Village development.

== Demographics ==
Historical population
Census	Pop.	Note	%±
1950	198		—
1960	2,006		913.1%
1970	4,831		140.8%
1980	4,920		1.8%
1990	5,383		9.4%
2000	6,733		25.1%
2010	7,137		6.0%
2020	8,159		14.3%
U.S. Decennial Census

=== 2020 census ===
As of the 2020 census, North Bay Village had a population of 8,159 and 1,861 families. The median age was 40.8 years. 13.4% of residents were under the age of 18 and 13.4% of residents were 65 years of age or older. For every 100 females there were 93.8 males, and for every 100 females age 18 and over there were 91.6 males age 18 and over.

100.0% of residents lived in urban areas, while 0.0% lived in rural areas.

There were 3,886 households in North Bay Village, of which 22.1% had children under the age of 18 living in them. Of all households, 32.5% were married-couple households, 24.8% were households with a male householder and no spouse or partner present, and 32.5% were households with a female householder and no spouse or partner present. About 36.4% of all households were made up of individuals and 7.1% had someone living alone who was 65 years of age or older.

There were 4,590 housing units, of which 15.3% were vacant. The homeowner vacancy rate was 2.3% and the rental vacancy rate was 11.3%.

North Bay Village racial composition (Hispanics excluded from racial categories) (NH = Non-Hispanic)
Race	Number	Percentage
White (NH)	2,379	29.16%
Black or African American (NH)	388	4.76%
Native American or Alaska Native (NH)	3	0.04%
Asian (NH)	209	2.56%
Pacific Islander or Native Hawaiian (NH)	0	0.00%
Some Other Race (NH)	90	1.10%
Two or more races/Multiracial (NH)	296	3.63%
Hispanic or Latino	4,794	58.76%
Total	8,159	

=== 2010 census ===
North Bay Village Demographics
2010 Census	North Bay Village	Miami-Dade County	Florida
Total population	7,137	2,496,435	18,801,310
Population, percent change, 2000 to 2010	+6.0%	+10.8%	+17.6%
Population density	19,303.3/sq mi	1,315.5/sq mi	350.6/sq mi
White or Caucasian (including White Hispanic)	82.6%	73.8%	75.0%
(Non-Hispanic White or Caucasian)	31.0%	15.4%	57.9%
Black or African-American	6.1%	18.9%	16.0%
Hispanic or Latino (of any race)	58.0%	65.0%	22.5%
Asian	4.1%	1.5%	2.4%
Native American or Native Alaskan	0.2%	0.2%	0.4%
Pacific Islander or Native Hawaiian	0.1%	0.0%	0.1%
Two or more races (Multiracial)	3.4%	2.4%	2.5%
Some Other Race	3.5%	3.2%	3.6%

As of 2010, there were 4,572 households, out of which 26.4% were vacant.

=== 2000 census ===
In 2000, 21.6% had children under the age of 18 living with them, 32.7% were married couples living together, 11.2% had a female householder with no husband present, and 51.5% were non-families. 38.7% of all households were made up of individuals, and 8.4% had someone living alone who was 65 years of age or older. The average household size was 2.10 and the average family size was 2.85.

In 2000, the city population was spread out, with 16.8% under the age of 18, 8.8% from 18 to 24, 42.0% from 25 to 44, 20.2% from 45 to 64, and 12.1% who were 65 years of age or older. The median age was 35 years. For every 100 females, there were 100.8 males. For every 100 females age 18 and over, there were 100.4 males.

In 2000, the median income for a household in the city was $34,354, and the median income for a family was $37,931. Males had a median income of $31,740 versus $27,234 for females. The per capita income for the city was $21,017. 12.9% of the population and 7.8% of families were below the poverty line. Out of the total population, 13.6% of those under the age of 18 and 9.3% of those 65 and older were living below the poverty line.

As of 2000, speakers of Spanish as a first language was spoken by 53.30%, while English accounted for 33.40%, Portuguese was 9.11%, French at 1.35%, and Italian was at 1.16% of the population.

== Economy ==
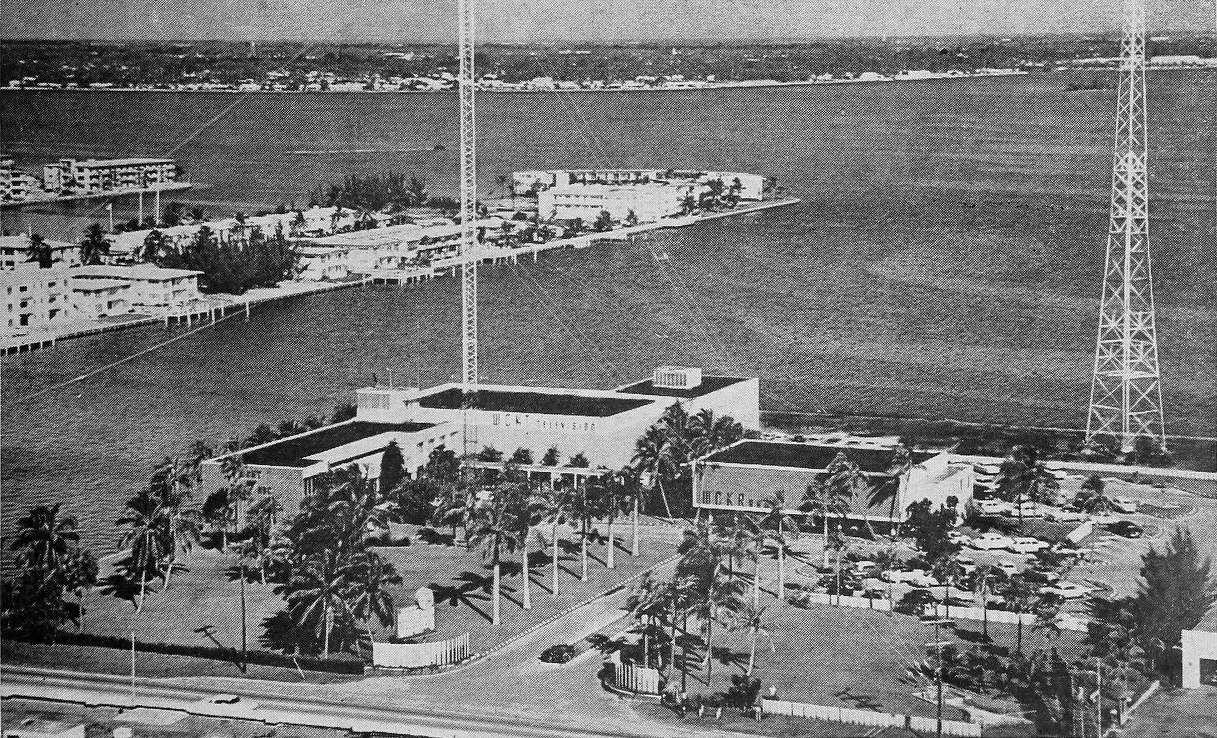
Studios for WCKT (left) and WCKR (right) on the 79th Street Causeway in North Bay Village. Transmitter towers belonged to WCKR. (1961)

Among the companies based in North Bay Village are the cable channels GOL TV. WSVN - Sunbeam Television Corporation. WIOD Radio, had been based at North Bay Village for years before being consolidated with other radio facilities in Broward County. Signage for WIOD can still be seen on the building to the east of WSVN-TV, (WCKT) the Fox affiliate for the region. WSVN (WCKT) has maintained its studios in North Bay Village since 1956. North Bay Village is often labeled the "Radio City of South Florida" due to its broadcasting legacy. (WIOD and WSVN (WCKT) began as affiliates of NBC.)

In recent years, North Bay Village has been opening restaurants in the surrounding area to increase quality of the city and generate more revenue.

== Government ==
There are four Commissioners and one Mayor. Current Commissioners are Andy Daro, Goran Cuk, Richard Chervony, and Doris Acosta. Mayor is Rachel Streitfeld.

The village maintains its own police department. Carlos Noriega is currently the Chief of Police.

City hall is located at 1666 John F. Kennedy Causeway, North Bay Village, Florida.

== Education ==
Miami-Dade County Public Schools is the local school district. Treasure Island Elementary School is in the village. In addition to Treasure Island it serves Normandy Island and the north Bay Causeway Islands. Miami Beach Nautilus Middle School and Miami Beach Senior High School serve North Bay Village.
