= Fabián Basabe =

American politician

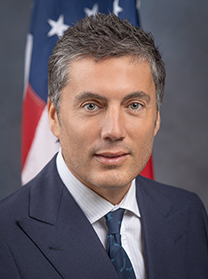

Member of the Florida House of Representatives from the 106th district
- Incumbent
- Assumed office November 8, 2022
- Preceded by: Michael Grieco

Personal details
- Born: March 30, 1978 (age 48) New York City, New York, U.S.
- Party: Republican
- Spouse: Martina Borgomanero (m. 2005)

Fabián Basabe (born March 30, 1978) is an American businessman and former reality television star who has served as a member of the Florida House of Representatives for the 106th district since November 8, 2022.

He has had a string of legal issues including various accusations from men of sexual harassment and abuse.

== Early life and education ==
Basabe was born in New York City to an American mother and an Ecuadorian father. In 1987, Basabe's family moved to Miami, where his parents operated a hotel. He graduated from Cheshire Academy. He studied international relations at Pepperdine University and then moved to Manhattan, where he became a socialite and television personality.

== Career ==
Before entering politics, Basabe appeared in the reality television series Filthy Rich: Cattle Drive. In 2021, Basabe filed to run for Miami Beach City Commissioner, but he was removed from the ballot when it was found he did not meet the Miami Beach one-year residency requirement. He was elected to the Florida House of Representatives in November 2022.

Basabe describes himself as fiscally conservative and socially liberal.

== Legal issues ==
In 2016, Basabe was charged with misdemeanor disorderly conduct in Miami Beach after he climbed on the roof of a car and shouted at pedestrians as the vehicle traveled down Washington Avenue.

In August 2020, Basabe encountered U.S. Marshals, when "armed agents surrounded him on his boat in a marina near Charleston, South Carolina." The report states "agents were acting on an outstanding warrant after Basabe allegedly failed to address a criminal charge arising from a Miami Beach incident in which he grabbed a neighbor's phone." Basabe was extradited from South Carolina to Florida. State Attorney Katherine Fernandez Rundle asked Florida Governor Ron DeSantis to reassign Basabe's case to a different jurisdiction after Basabe repeatedly tried to influence the prosecutor.

On April 13, 2023, CBS 4 Miami reported an allegation that Basabe physically assaulted his 25-year-old male legislative aide. The aide claimed Basabe had been drinking after Governor Ron DeSantis's inauguration on January 3, then slapping him in the face and demanding he stand in a corner. The law firm hired by the Florida House leadership to conduct an investigation into the slapping concluded that the incident was "inconclusive."

In May 2023, several male aides filed complaints with the Florida House, alleging Basabe sexually harassed them, stating he told them he wanted to have sex and wanted to be a "bottom" while they could be "tops". A legislative aide said Basabe slapped him on the buttocks during a visit to a local elementary school and said "I want all of that butt." A volunteer in Basabe's office claimed that Basabe instructed him to openly flirt with him when they were at the state capitol. Both men say Basabe showed them a photo of a naked man on his phone. Basabe denied the accusations, calling them "ridiculous."

On September 5, 2025, the Miami Herald published an updated article about a straight man, whom the newspaper referred to as Michael. The media outlet reported that Michael had seen an article about details of other claims made against Basabe since his election to the Florida House in 2022, including his alleged sexual harassment of two former legislative aides. In the article, Michael was reported as stating that, in 2003, Basabe invited him to his condo and gave him a drugged drink, and while Michael was incapacitated, Basabe proceeded to take Michael's penis into his mouth and sodomized him. Basabe claimed the accusations were false.

In July 2026, Basabe was found liable in a civil suit for sexual harassment, and he was ordered to pay $450,000.
