= SAVE Florida =

LGBTQ advocacy organization in Florida, U.S.

SAVE
- Safeguarding American Values for Everyone
- Formation: 1993; 33 years ago
- Type: LGBTQ political advocacy
- Location: Miami, Florida
- Region served: South Florida
- Website: save.lgbt
- Formerly called: SAVE Dade

Safeguarding American Values for Everyone (SAVE) is a grassroots nonprofit political advocacy organization located in Miami, Florida. Founded in 1993, the organization's stated mission is to "promote, protect and defend equality for people in South Florida who are lesbian, gay, bisexual and transgender."

== Background ==
SAVE is an acronym which stands for Safeguarding American Values for Everyone. Founded in 1993, the organization's name is an appropriation of the name of the American Family Association and singer Anita Bryant's 'Save Our Children' campaign to overturn a January 1977 Miami-Dade County ordinance that outlawed discrimination on the basis of sexual orientation in employment, housing, and public accommodations. That campaign succeeded in passing a ballot measure repealing the nondiscrimination measure in June 1977. The same year, the Florida state legislature approved a measure prohibiting adoption of children by gays and lesbians.

== History ==
Emboldened in 1993 by a liberalizing political climate surrounding the issue of LGBTQ rights in America, LGBTQ activists and organizers, under the informal moniker of 'SAVE', initiated a lobbying campaign to pass another nondiscrimination ordinance at the Miami-Dade County Commission. In 1998, after five years of heavy lobbying both by local leaders and by grassroots supporters organized by the founders of the 'SAVE' campaign, the Commission passed for the second time an ordinance which outlawed discrimination on the basis of sexual orientation in employment, housing, and public accommodations.

In response to the reinstatement of the measure, termed by supporters as a "Human Rights Ordinance," religious and conservative opponents conducted a petition drive which succeeded in again putting the measure to the voters of Miami-Dade County for approval. After a closely fought campaign to uphold the nondiscrimination protections organized in large part by SAVE (known at the time as SAVE Action), voters rejected the ballot measure in the 2002 elections, upholding the 1998 ordinance and repudiating the 1977 repeal vote.

After 2002, SAVE adopted the name SAVE Dade to reflect its roots in Miami-Dade County and its local focus. Between 2002 and 2008, SAVE Dade shifted its focus from electoral work to issue advocacy and lobbying. The organization worked closely with the Miami Beach City Commission to craft and pass an extension of nondiscrimination protections to the transgender community in the Miami Beach jurisdiction, as well as a citywide domestic partner registry open to same- and opposite-sex couples alike.

In 2008, amid a wave of state constitutional amendments banning same-sex marriage during that decade, SAVE Dade led the effort to organize South Florida's voters against a ballot measure amending the Florida Constitution. While the larger statewide effort to reject the amendment ultimately failed by a narrow margin, the effort directed by SAVE Dade contributed to a broad rejection by voters in the densely populated counties of South Florida. The same year, partially as a contingency in the event that the voters approved the same-sex marriage ban, SAVE Dade worked closely with the Miami-Dade County Commission to successfully pass a countywide domestic partner registry, which many municipalities and local businesses subsequently recognized for the purpose of extending spousal benefits to same-sex domestic partners of employees.

Also in 2008, SAVE Action PAC, a political action committee incorporated by SAVE Dade in order to comply with campaign finance laws, issued for the first time a list of "pro-equality" endorsements of mostly local candidates running for office, including then-Senator Barack Obama, future House Foreign Affairs Committee chairwoman Rep. Ileana Ros-Lehtinen, and future DNC chairwoman Rep. Debbie Wasserman Schultz.

In 2009, in order to raise awareness of the new domestic partner registry, SAVE Dade founded a third arm, SAVE Foundation, a 501c(3) nonprofit organization with the mission of fostering positive change for LGBTQ South Floridians through non-electoral education of the community.

In 2010, SAVE helped raise awareness of the "In re: Gill" case, which made national headlines when it resulted in the overturning of the 1977 same-sex adoption ban at the Florida Supreme Court.

In 2011, SAVE Action PAC committed significant resources to organize get out the vote efforts for then-Commissioner Carlos Gimenez's successful bid to replace County Mayor Carlos Alvarez in the wake of his recall by the voters of Miami-Dade.

In 2012, SAVE Action PAC directed a full-scale get out the vote campaign on behalf of David Richardson in the competitive Democratic primary for Florida's 113th State House district. With no Republican or third-party candidates running for the seat, Richardson became the first openly LGBTQ individual to win election to the Florida state legislature when he won the primary that August. Richardson has publicly and repeatedly credited SAVE for the win, and subsequently he has continued to cultivate a friendly public relationship with the organization and its supporters.

In 2014, the organization changed its name back simply to SAVE to reflect a larger reach and wider focus throughout South Florida and beyond. The name change accompanied endorsements during the 2014 election cycle in Broward County in addition to Miami-Dade, as well as the organization's representation as a plaintiff by the ACLU of Florida in Grimsley et al v. Scott, which resulted in the effective overturning of the statewide constitutional ban on same sex marriage by the U.S. Supreme Court at the end of that year.

== Organizational structure ==
Officially, SAVE exists as three separate, but associated, legal entities for the purposes of compliance with tax laws and campaign finance regulations. These three entities are:

1. Safeguarding American Values for Everyone, Inc. -- a 501c(4) issue advocacy organization allowed to accept unlimited non-tax-exempt financial contributions but restricted to activities which do not explicitly endorse political candidates or ballot measures
2. SAVE Foundation, Inc. -- a 501c(3) nonprofit organization which accepts unlimited tax-exempt contributions but which is restricted to engaging only in non-political educational or charity work
3. SAVE Action PAC—a political action committee whose financial contributions are restricted to an annual cap per donor but which may spend directly towards influencing elections on behalf of a particular candidate and may give directly to candidates, parties, or other PACs
