= Dan Gelber =

American politician (born 1960)

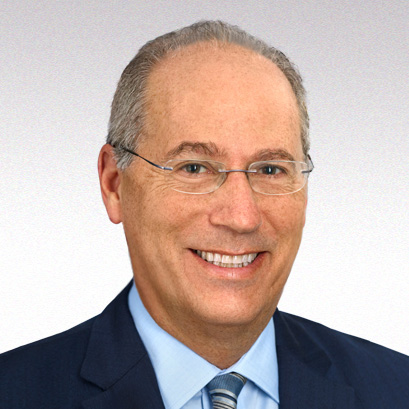

38th Mayor of Miami Beach
- In office November 13, 2017 – November 28, 2023
- Preceded by: Philip Levine
- Succeeded by: Steven Meiner

Member of the Florida Senate from the 35th district
- In office November 4, 2008 – November 2, 2010
- Preceded by: Gwen Margolis
- Succeeded by: Gwen Margolis

Minority Leader of the Florida House of Representatives
- In office November 2006 – November 18, 2008
- Preceded by: Chris Smith
- Succeeded by: Franklin Sands

Member of the Florida House of Representatives from the 106th district
- In office November 7, 2000 – November 4, 2008
- Preceded by: Elaine Bloom
- Succeeded by: Richard Steinberg

Personal details
- Born: Daniel Saul Gelber; November 26, 1960 (age 65) Miami, Florida, U.S.
- Party: Democratic
- Spouse: Joan Silverstein
- Children: 3
- Education: Tufts University (BA); University of Florida (JD)
- Website: Official website

Daniel Saul Gelber (born November 26, 1960) is an American politician and former prosecutor. He served in the Florida Legislature from 2000 to 2010 and was the Democratic nominee for Attorney General of Florida in 2010. From 2017 to 2023, he served as mayor of Miami Beach, Florida.

Gelber represented the 106th district in the Florida House of Representatives from 2000 to 2008, also serving as House Minority Leader in his last term. He then served in the Florida Senate, representing the 35th district from 2008 to 2010. He ran for Attorney General of Florida in 2010, losing the general election to Republican Pam Bondi. In 2012, he co-founded the law firm of Gelber Schachter & Greenberg, P.A. along with Adam Schachter and Gerald Greenberg. The firm handles complex civil litigation and white-collar criminal defense cases in Florida and across the country.

Gelber was reelected mayor, without opposition, on September 6, 2019, after no other candidate qualified to challenge him by the filing deadline. His third term began in November 2021 and ended in 2023.

== Early life and family ==
Gelber was born to Jewish parents Seymour Gelber (1919–2019) and Edith Schwitzman Gelber (1924–2006). The elder Gelber served as Miami Beach's 33rd mayor, from 1991 to 1997. Gelber grew up in Miami Beach, Florida, and is a graduate of Miami Beach Senior High School. Gelber has a BA from Tufts University and a Juris Doctor from University of Florida College of Law where he was a Harry S. Truman Scholar. When he was 24, he co-founded a summer camp for children with cancer where he volunteers every summer as a bunk counselor and provides support services for patients and their families. Gelber has been a Big Brother volunteer since 1985, and is a former president of the board of directors of Big Brothers Organization.

Gelber introduced Judge Marilyn Milian (of the TV show The People's Court) to her husband John Schlesinger at a local bar one Friday night.

Currently, Gelber lives in Miami Beach with his wife, Joan Silverstein, a federal prosecutor, and their three children: Sophie, Hannah, and Max.

== Public service ==
Gelber's career in public service started at the age of twenty-five, when he was appointed as one of the youngest federal prosecutors in the nation. After nearly a decade prosecuting public corruption and civil rights cases, Gelber was selected by United States Senator Sam Nunn to be Chief Counsel and Staff Director of the U.S. Senate's Permanent Subcommittee on Investigations where he directed U.S. Senate investigations into global terrorism and weapons of mass destruction.

Gelber was first elected to the Florida House of Representatives in 2000 from District 106. As a member of the Florida Legislature, Gelber frequently sparred with former governor Jeb Bush. The Wall Street Journal referred to Gelber as Bush's "chief nemesis." Nevertheless, Gelber earned the respect of the former governor, who once told the St. Petersburg Times that Gelber "would be a very well qualified Governor."

In 2005, Gelber took charge of the Florida House Democratic Caucus' political operation. Under his leadership, despite the Democrats losing the Governor's mansion, state house Democrats have picked up nine Republican seats, their first net gain in the lower chamber in sixteen years, his party's best ever showing in a single cycle, and the fifth best overall gain in the nation.

In 2008, Gelber was elected to the Florida Senate from the 35th District.

== Legislative record ==
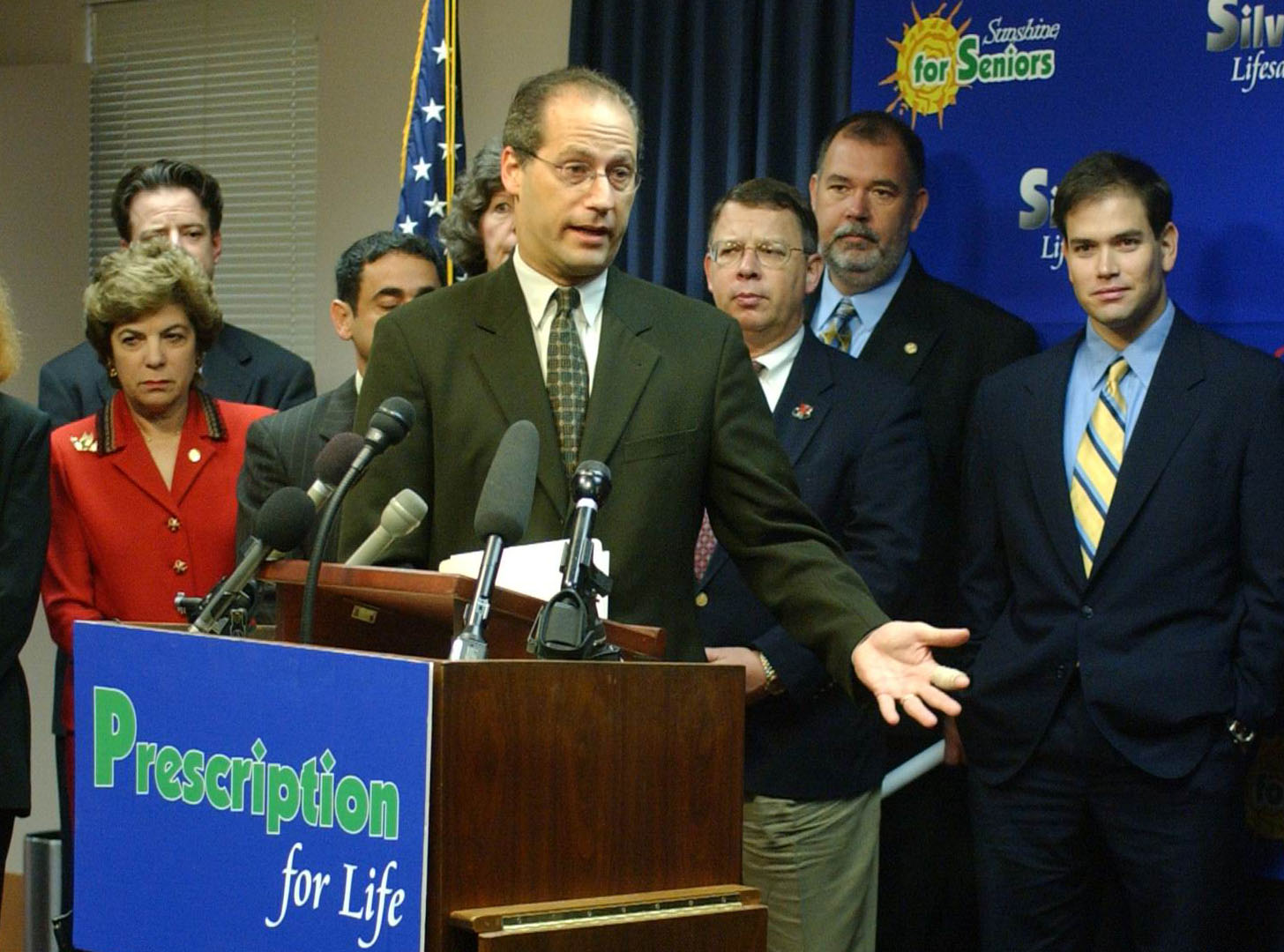
Gelber makes a point in a news conference about the Prescription Drugs for Seniors Bill during the 2003 Legislature

Gelber has worked to increase fairness in the Florida tax code. In 2009, Gelber sponsored and helped pass a bill that closed a real estate loophole that allowed high end developers to evade taxes. He also worked to stop multistate corporations from avoiding Florida taxes.

Gelber is critical of recent budget cuts that leave Florida last in per student spending. He has fought spending cuts to the state university system. He is also a vocal critic of the FCAT, believing that "[y]ou shouldn't have a school system where the ceiling is the floor."

Drawing on his experience prosecuting corruption as a US Attorney, Gelber has been active in cleaning up government. Sen. Gelber sponsored a bill that provides criminal penalties for official misconduct, criminal misuse of official position and bid tampering. This bill passed in HB 847 and was signed into law.

== 2010 Attorney General campaign ==
On June 8, 2009, Gelber announced his candidacy for Florida Attorney General. Reminiscent of Senator Bob Graham's Workdays, Gelber performed community service across Florida, which included serving meals to the homeless, cleaning up the Wekiva River, and joining elementary school students in writing letters to veterans.

Gelber soundly won the August 24, 2010, primary election, defeating his Democratic opponent fellow state senator Dave Aronberg by 18 points. His campaign has been endorsed by many top public servants, including Republican state senator J. Alex Villalobos, former United States Attorney General Janet Reno, former Florida Education Secretary Betty Castor, former Congressman Jim Davis, Congresswoman and DNC Vice Chair Debbie Wasserman Schultz and Tampa Mayor Pam Iorio, as well as the Florida Police Benevolent Association, the state's largest law enforcement union.

Ultimately, Gelber lost the election to the Republican candidate, Pam Bondi.

== Mayor of Miami Beach ==
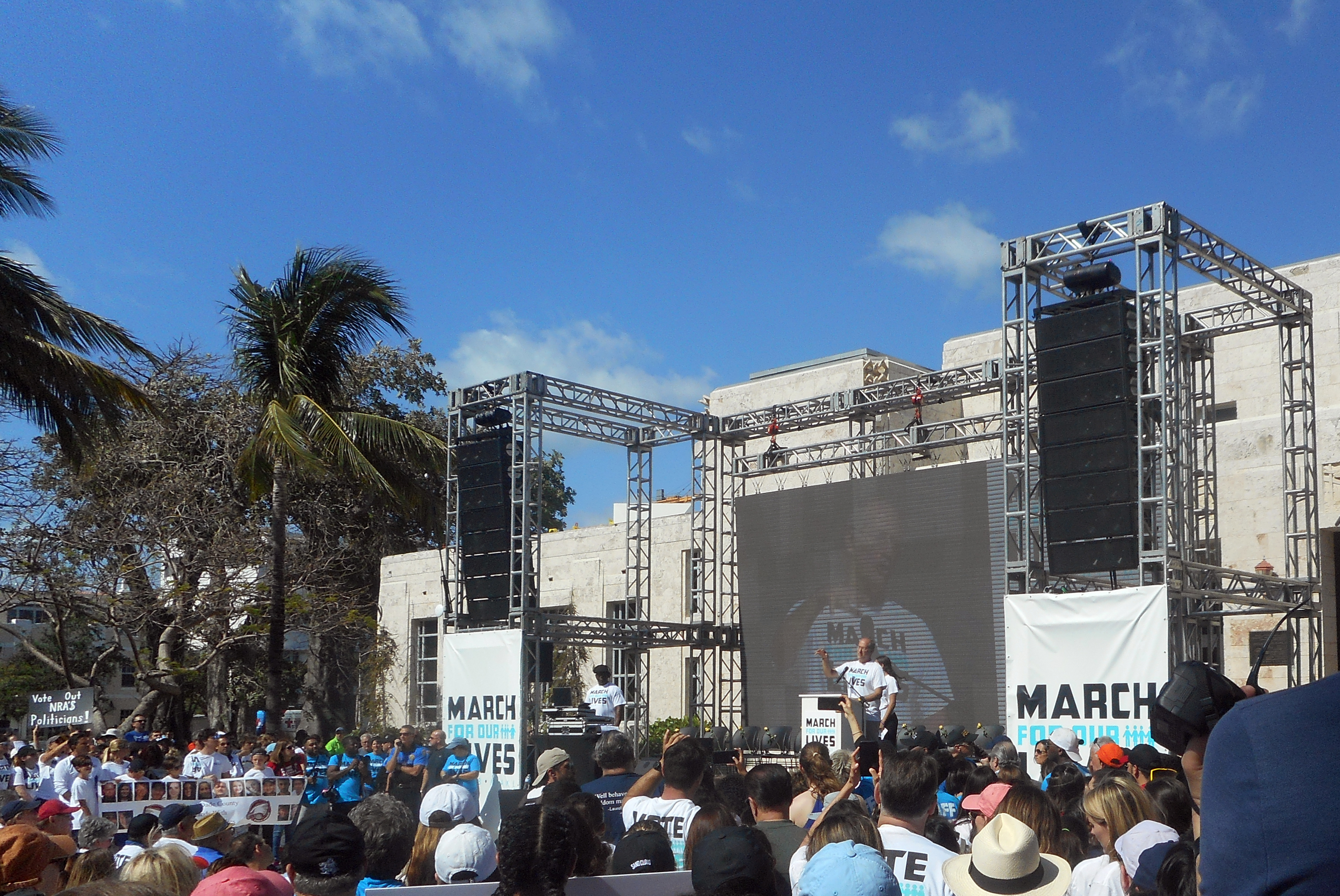
Mayor Dan Gelber speaking at rally at the Bass Museum, Miami Beach, 2018

On November 7, 2017, Gelber was elected mayor of Miami Beach with 82 percent of the vote over three other candidates. His main competitor, former commissioner Michael Grieco, withdrew from the election and eventually resigned from office amid a campaign finance scandal that led to criminal charges.

Gelber has also advocated for Florida Democrats to move to open primaries as a strategy for improving their electoral prospects in the state.

== Committee assignments ==
Committee Membership

- Commerce, vice chair
- Higher Education Appropriations, vice chair
- Policy and Steering Committee on Social Responsibility
- Policy and Steering Committee on Ways and Means
- Communications, Energy, and Public Utilities
- Judiciary
- Select Committee on Florida's Economy
- Joint Committee on Public Counsel Oversight

== See also ==
- List of mayors of Miami Beach, Florida

Florida House of Representatives
Preceded by Elaine Bloom	Member of the Florida House of Representatives from the 106th district 2000–2008	Succeeded by Richard Steinberg
Florida Senate
Preceded by Gwen Margolis	Member of the Florida Senate from the 35th district 2008–2010	Succeeded by Gwen Margolis
Preceded by Chris Smith	Minority Leader of the Florida Senate; 2006–2008	Succeeded by Franklin Sands
Party political offices
Preceded by Skip Campbell	Democratic nominee for Attorney General of Florida; 2010	Succeeded by George Sheldon
Political offices
Preceded by Philip Levine	Mayor of Miami Beach; 2017–2023	Succeeded by Steven Meiner
