= Marie Woodson =

American politician

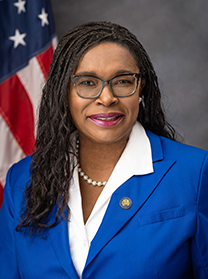

Member of the Florida House of Representatives
- Incumbent
- Assumed office November 3, 2020
- Preceded by: Shevrin Jones
- Constituency: 101st district (2020–2022); 105th district (2022–present)

Personal details
- Born: Marie Paule Port-de-Paix, Haiti
- Party: Democratic
- Spouse: Bob Woodson
- Children: 2
- Education: Miami Dade College (AS); Florida International University (BS); St. Thomas University (MS)

Marie Paule Woodson is an American politician who served as a member of the Florida House of Representatives for the 101st district from 2020 to 2022. Due to redistricting, she is now the representative for the 105th district.

== Early life and education ==
Woodson was born in Port-de-Paix, Haiti. She moved to Florida in 1981, where she earned an Associate of Science degree in public administration from Miami Dade College, a Bachelor of Science in criminal justice from Florida International University, and a Master of Science in public administration and management from St. Thomas University.

== Career ==
After moving to the United States, Woodson worked in a textile factory. She later worked as a public administrator for the Government of Miami-Dade County for several years. Woodson was elected to the Florida House of Representatives and assumed office on November 3, 2020.
