= Meg Weinberger =

American politician

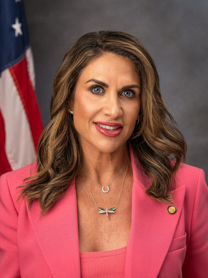

Member of the Florida House of Representatives from the 94th district
- Incumbent
- Assumed office November 5, 2024
- Preceded by: Rick Roth

Personal details
- Born: Megan Georgene O'Neill; October 16, 1972 (age 53) Detroit, Michigan, U.S.
- Party: Republican
- Spouse: Eric Weinberger
- Children: 2
- Education: Phillips Business College (attended); Palm Beach State College (attended)

Meg Weinberger (born Megan Georgene O'Neill, October 16, 1972) is an American politician serving as a Republican member of the Florida House of Representatives for the 94th district. She moved to Florida in 1979. She graduated from Phillips Business College and Palm Beach State College. Weinberger lives in Palm Beach Gardens and works as a development director. She has "established animal therapy programs for children and adults with special needs". She is a Christian.
