= Doug Bankson =

American politician

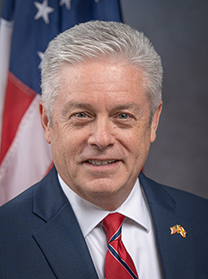

Member of the Florida House of Representatives from the 39th district
- Incumbent
- Assumed office November 8, 2022

Personal details
- Born: February 18, 1963 (age 63) Altadena, California
- Party: Republican

Douglas “Doug” Michael Bankson is an American politician currently serving in the Florida House of Representatives. A Republican, he represents the 39th district. He won the seat in the 2022 Florida House of Representatives election, defeating Democrat Tiffany Hughes. Bankson and his wife Jeri are also pastors at Victory Church in Apopka.

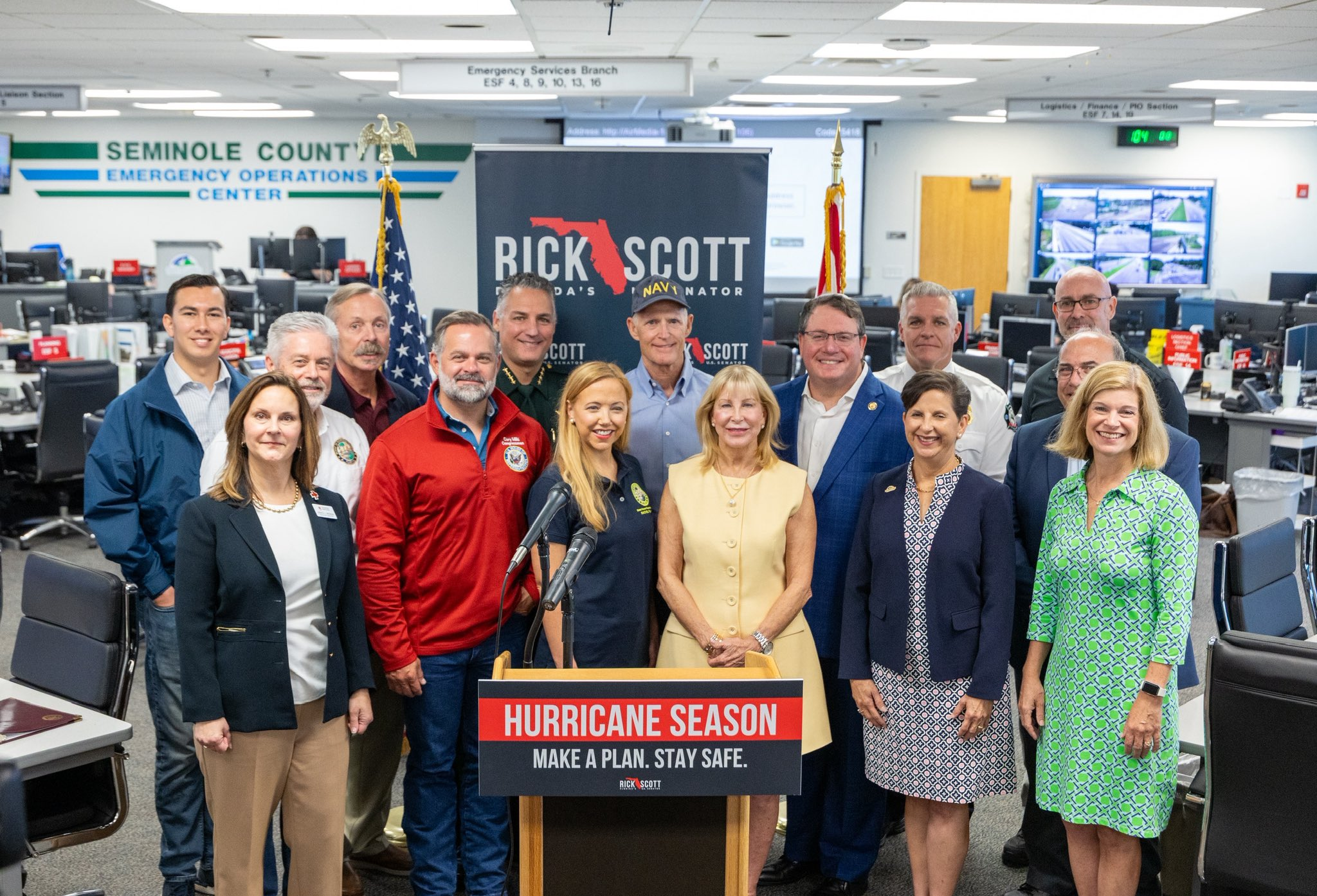
Bankson with Senator Rick Scott, Congressman Cory Mills, Congressman Randy Fine, Rep. Rachel Plakon, and Sheriff Dennis Lemma at the Seminole County Emergency Operations Center, May 2025
