= Florida's 39th House of Representatives district =

Florida district

Florida's 39th State House of Representatives district
Representative
Doug Bankson; R–Apopka

Florida's 39th House of Representatives district elects one member of the Florida House of Representatives. It covers parts of Orange County and Seminole County.

== Members ==
- Doug Bankson (since 2022)
