= Florida's 101st House of Representatives district =

Florida district

Florida's 101st State House of Representatives district
Representative
Todd Delmay; D–Hollywood

Florida's 101st House of Representatives district elects one member of the Florida House of Representatives. It contains parts of Broward County.

== Members ==
- Shevrin Jones (2012–2020)
- Marie Woodson (2020–2022)
- Hillary Cassel (2022–2026)
- Todd Delmay (since 2026)
