= Florida's 62nd House of Representatives district =

Florida district

Florida's 62nd State House of Representatives district
Representative
| Michele Rayner; D–St. Petersburg |

Florida's 62nd House of Representatives district elects one member of the Florida House of Representatives. It covers parts of Hillsborough County and Pinellas County.

== Members ==
- Michele Rayner (since 2022)
