= Florida's 22nd House of Representatives district =

American legislative district

Florida's 22nd State House of Representatives district
Representative
Chad Johnson; R–Gainesville

Florida's 22nd House of Representatives district elects one member of the Florida House of Representatives. It covers parts of Alachua County.

== Members ==
- Keith Perry (2010–2012)
- Charlie Stone (2012–2020)
- Joe Harding (2020–2022)
- Chuck Clemons (2022–2024)
- Chad Johnson (since 2025)
