= Florida's 94th House of Representatives district =

Florida district

Florida's 94th State House of Representatives district
Representative
Meg Weinberger; R–West Palm Beach

Florida's 94th House of Representatives district elects one member of the Florida House of Representatives. It contains parts of Palm Beach County.

== Members ==
- Meg Weinberger (since 2024)
