= Florida's 106th House of Representatives district =

Florida district

Florida's 106th State House of Representatives district
Representative
Fabián Basabe; R–Miami Beach

Florida's 106th House of Representatives district elects one member of the Florida House of Representatives. It contains the northeast & parts of the eastern coast of Miami-Dade County, as of November 8, 2022. Previously was districted to the entire western coast of Collier County.

== Members ==
- Fabián Basabe (since 2022)
