= 2010 United States House of Representatives elections in Florida =

- November 2, 2010

All 25 Florida seats to the United States House of Representatives
	Majority party	Minority party
Party	Republican	Democratic
Last election	15	10
Seats won	19	6
Seat change	▲4	▼4
Popular vote	2,234,534	1,528,756
Percentage	55.61%	38.04%
Swing	▲5.69%	▼9.61%

Republican
40–50%
50–60%
60–70%
70–80%
80–90%
90–100%
Democratic
50–60%
60–70%
70–80%
80–90%

The 2010 United States House of Representatives Elections in Florida were held on November 2, 2010, to determine who would represent the state of Florida in the United States House of Representatives. Representatives are elected for two-year terms; those elected served in the 112th Congress from January 2011 until January 2013. Florida had twenty-five seats in the House, apportioned according to the 2000 United States census, but would soon gain two more congressional seats in 2012.

A large majority of the incumbents sought re-election on November 2, and only the 12th district and the 17th district were open races. Upon the resignation of Robert Wexler, a special election was held in April to determine the new representative of 19th district. The winner of that race was Ted Deutch of the Democratic Party, who sought re-election on November 2.

== Overview ==
Results of the 2010 United States House of Representatives elections in Florida by district:

District	Republican		Democratic		Others		Total		Result
District	Votes	%	Votes	%	Votes	%	Votes	%	Result
District 1	170,821	80.00%	0	0.00%	42,705	20.00%	213,526	100.00%	Republican hold
District 2	136,371	53.60%	105,211	41.35%	12,856	5.05%	254,438	100.00%	Republican gain
District 3	50,932	33.89%	94,744	63.03%	4,625	3.08%	150,301	100.00%	Democratic hold
District 4	178,238	77.21%	0	0.00%	52,607	22.79%	230,845	100.00%	Republican hold
District 5	208,815	67.43%	100,858	32.57%	0	0.00	309,673	100.00%	Republican hold
District 6	179,349	71.46%	0	0.00%	71,632	28.54%	250,981	100.00%	Republican hold
District 7	185,470	69.03%	83,206	30.97%	0	0.00%	268,676	100.00%	Republican hold
District 8	123,586	56.11%	84,167	38.22%	12,491	5.67%	220,244	100.00%	Republican gain
District 9	165,433	71.43%	66,158	28.57%	0	0.00%	231,591	100.00%	Republican hold
District 10	137,943	65.92%	71,313	34.08%	0	0.00%	209,256	100.00%	Republican hold
District 11	61,817	40.37%	91,328	59.63%	0	0.00%	153,145	100.00%	Democratic hold
District 12	102,704	48.14%	87,769	41.14%	22,857	10.72%	213,330	100.00%	Republican hold
District 13	183,811	68.86%	83,123	31.14%	0	0.00%	266,934	100.00%	Republican hold
District 14	188,341	68.56%	74,525	27.13%	11,825	4.31%	274,691	100.00%	Republican hold
District 15	157,079	64.73%	85,595	35.27%	0	0.00%	242,674	100.00%	Republican hold
District 16	162,285	66.85%	80,327	33.09%	151	0.06%	242,763	100.00%	Republican hold
District 17	0	0.00%	106,361	86.21%	17,009	13.79%	123,370	100.00%	Democratic hold
District 18	102,360	68.89%	46,235	31.11%	0	0.00%	148,595	100.00%	Republican hold
District 19	78,733	37.30%	132,098	62.59%	228	0.11%	211,059	100.00%	Democratic hold
District 20	63,845	38.10%	100,787	60.15%	2,938	1.75%	167,570	100.00%	Democratic hold
District 21	–	–	–	–	–	–	–	–	Republican hold
District 22	118,890	54.36%	99,804	45.64%	0	0.00%	218,694	100.00%	Republican gain
District 23	26,414	20.88%	100,066	79.12%	0	0.00%	126,480	100.00%	Democratic hold
District 24	146,129	59.64%	98,787	40.31%	115	0.05%	245,031	100.00%	Republican gain
District 25	74,859	52.15%	61,138	42.59%	7,556	5.26%	143,553	100.00%	Republican hold
Total	3,004,225	58.71%	1,853,600	36.22%	259,595	5.07%	5,117,420	100.00%	

== District 1 ==
2010 Florida's 1st congressional district election
- November 2, 2010
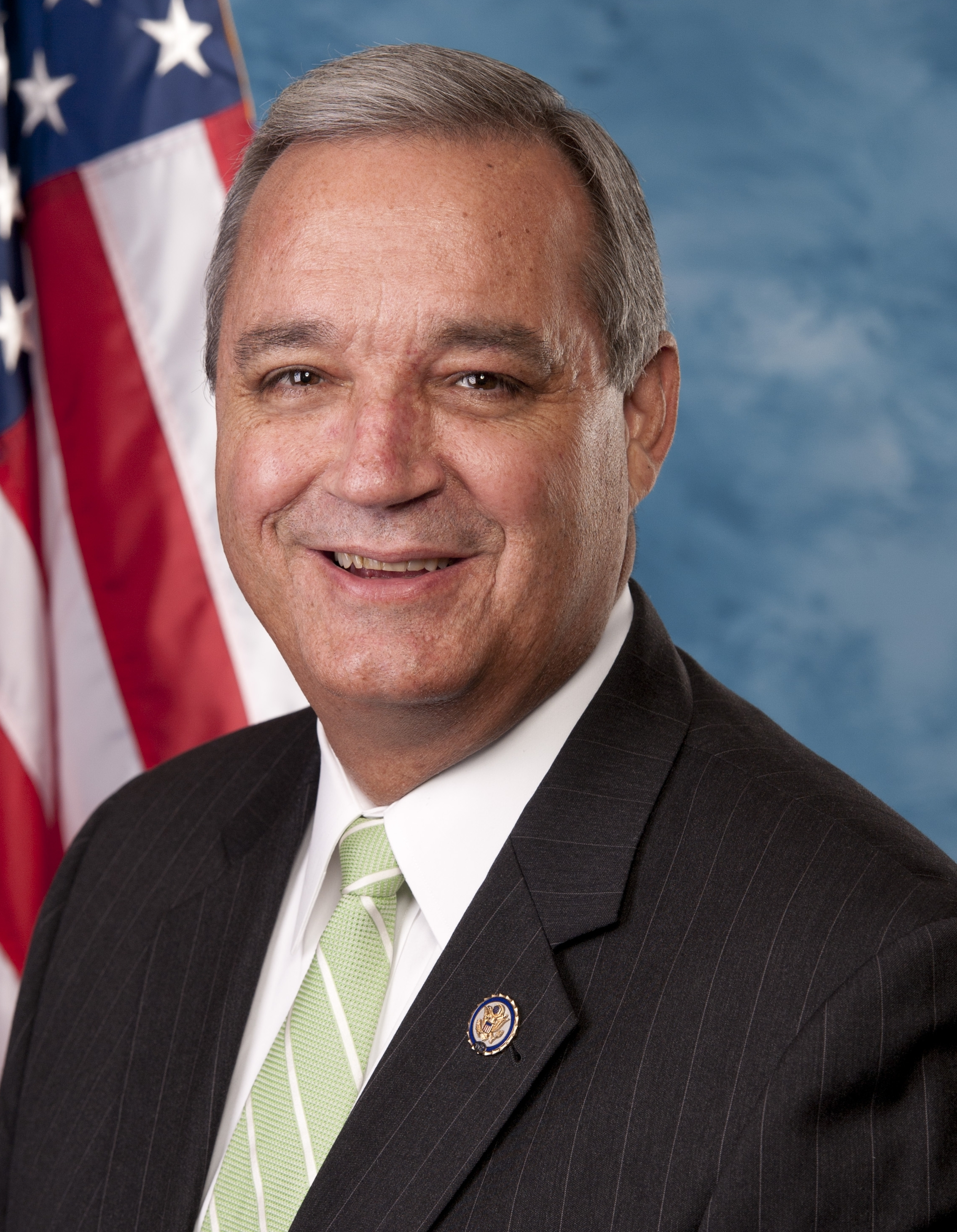

Nominee	Jeff Miller	Joe Cantrell	John Krause
Party	Republican	Independent	Independent
Popular vote	168,899	22,763	17,869
Percentage	80.61%	10.86%	8.52%
- County results Miller: 70–80% 80–90%
U.S. Representative before election
Jeff Miller
Republican
Elected U.S. Representative
Jeff Miller
Republican

Republican incumbent Jeff Miller has represented this western Florida Panhandle congressional district since winning a special election in 2001. Jeff Miller sought re-election, and won by a landslide against challenging Independents Joe Cantrell and John Krause. Miller was also challenged by Jim Bryan, a qualified write-in candidate.

Race details

- Race ranking and details from CQ Politics
- Campaign Contributions from OpenSecrets
- Race profile at The New York Times

Campaign websites

- Jeff Miller for Congress
- Joe Cantrell for Congress
- John Krause for Congress
- Jim Bryan for Congress

=== Predictions ===
Source	Ranking	As of
The Cook Political Report	Safe R	November 1, 2010
Rothenberg	Safe R	November 1, 2010
Sabato's Crystal Ball	Safe R	November 1, 2010
RCP	Safe R	November 1, 2010
CQ Politics	Safe R	October 28, 2010
New York Times	Safe R	November 1, 2010
FiveThirtyEight	Safe R	November 1, 2010

=== Results ===
Florida's 1st congressional district election, 2010
Party	Candidate	Votes	%
Republican	Jeff Miller (Incumbent)	168,899	81
Independent	Joe Cantrell	22,763	11
Independent	John Krause	17,869	9
Total votes		209,531	100
Republican hold			

== District 2 ==
2010 Florida's 2nd congressional district election
- November 2, 2010
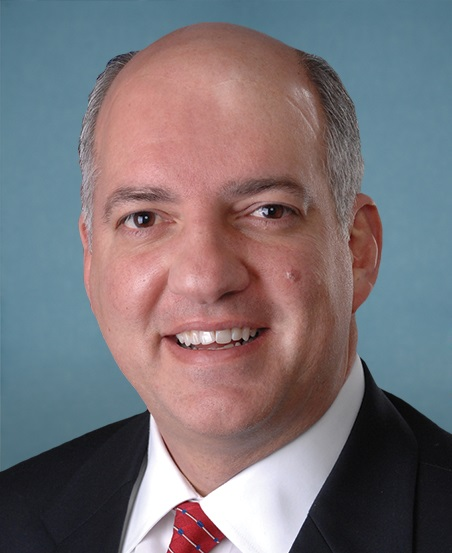

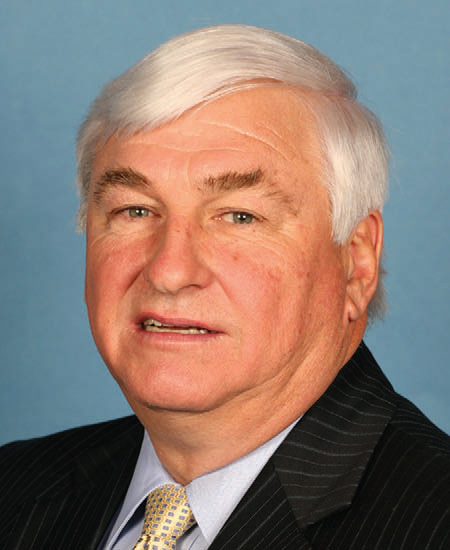
Nominee	Steve Southerland	Allen Boyd
Party	Republican	Democratic
Popular vote	134,912	104,415
Percentage	53.53%	41.43%
- County results Southerland: 50–60% 60–70% 70–80% 80–90% Boyd: 40–50% 50–60% 60–70%
U.S. Representative before election
Allen Boyd
Democratic
Elected U.S. Representative
Steve Southerland
Republican

Democratic incumbent Allen Boyd ran for reelection, facing Republican nominee businessman Steve Southerland. Independent candidates Paul C. McKain and Dianne Berryhill were also on the ballot, and Ray Netherwood qualified as a write-in candidate.

In addition, Green Party candidate Steve Wilkie did not qualify for the congressional election.

Boyd won the Democratic primary against State Senate Democratic Leader Alfred Lawson, Jr. Southerland won the Republican primary against Eddie Hendry, Ron McNeil, Barbara F. Olschner and David Scholl. Southerland went on to unseat Boyd in the general election following, among other issues, voter discontent with the incumbent for his support of the policies of the President.

The district, which includes Tallahassee, voted 54%–45% for John McCain in 2008. Race details

- Race ranking and details from CQ Politics
- Campaign Contributions from OpenSecrets
- Race profile at The New York Times

Campaign websites

- Allen Boyd for Congress
- Steve Southerland for Congress
- Paul McKain for Congress
- Dianne Berryhill for Congress
- Ray Netherwood for Congress
- Steve Wilkie for Congress - did not qualify

=== Polling ===
Poll Source	Dates Administered	Allen Boyd (D)	Steve Southerland (R)
The Hill/ANGA	October 16–19, 2010	38%	50%
Voter Survey Service	October 14–17, 2010	38%	50%
National Research	September 29–30, 2010	30%	46%
Tarrance Group†	April 12–13, 2010	37%	52%

==== Predictions ====
Source	Ranking	As of
The Cook Political Report	Lean R (flip)	November 1, 2010
Rothenberg	Likely R (flip)	November 1, 2010
Sabato's Crystal Ball	Lean R (flip)	November 1, 2010
RCP	Lean R (flip)	November 1, 2010
CQ Politics	Lean R (flip)	October 28, 2010
New York Times	Lean R (flip)	November 1, 2010
FiveThirtyEight	Safe R (flip)	November 1, 2010

=== Results ===
Florida's 2nd congressional district election, 2010
Party	Candidate	Votes	%
Republican	Steve Southerland	134,912	54
Democratic	Allen Boyd (Incumbent)	104,415	41
Independent	Paul C. McKain	7,058	3
Independent	Dianne Berryhill	5,653	2
Total votes		252,038	100
Republican gain from Democratic			

== District 3 ==
2010 Florida's 3rd congressional district election
- November 2, 2010
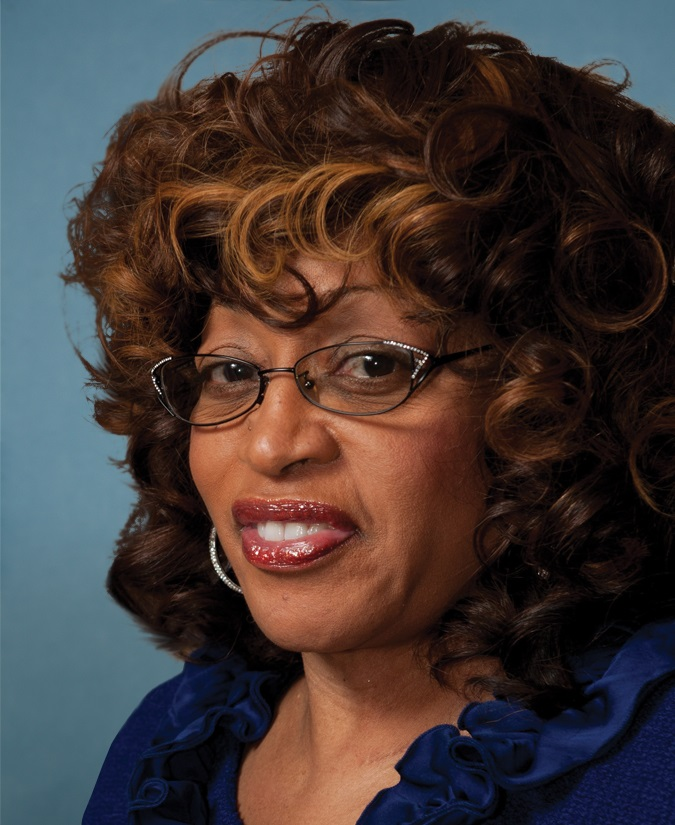

Nominee	Corrine Brown	Mike Yost
Party	Democratic	Republican
Popular vote	92,057	50,107
Percentage	62.75%	34.16%
- County results Brown: 60–70% 70–80% Yost: 50–60% 60–70% 70–80%
U.S. Representative before election
Corrine Brown
Democratic
Elected U.S. Representative
Corrine Brown
Democratic

Democrat Corrine Brown represents this north central Florida district. She was challenged by Republican nominee Mike Yost and Independent Terry Martin-Back, who Corrine Brown defeated on November 2, 2010.

Race details

- Race ranking and details from CQ Politics
- Campaign Contributions from OpenSecrets
- Race profile at The New York Times

Campaign websites

- Corrine Brown for Congress
- Mike Yost for Congress
- Terry Martin-Back for Congress

=== Predictions ===
Source	Ranking	As of
The Cook Political Report	Safe D	November 1, 2010
Rothenberg	Safe D	November 1, 2010
Sabato's Crystal Ball	Safe D	November 1, 2010
RCP	Safe D	November 1, 2010
CQ Politics	Safe D	October 28, 2010
New York Times	Safe D	November 1, 2010
FiveThirtyEight	Safe D	November 1, 2010

=== Results ===
Florida's 3rd congressional district election, 2010
Party	Candidate	Votes	%
Democratic	Corrine Brown (Incumbent)	92,057	63
Republican	Mike Yost	50,107	34
Independent	Terry Martin-Back	4,532	3
Total votes		146,696	100
Democratic hold			

== District 4 ==
2010 Florida's 4th congressional district election
- November 2, 2010
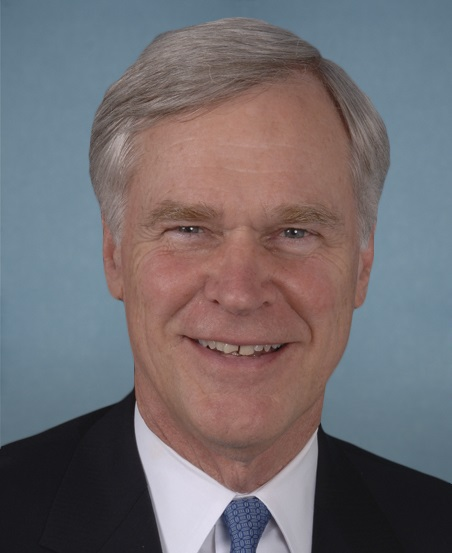

Nominee	Ander Crenshaw	Troy Stanley
Party	Republican	Independent
Popular vote	175,162	51,620
Percentage	77.23%	22.76%
- County results Crenshaw: 50–60% 60–70% 70–80% 80–90%
U.S. Representative before election
Ander Crenshaw
Republican
Elected U.S. Representative
Ander Crenshaw
Republican

This Jacksonville district is represented by Republican Ander Crenshaw. Independent Troy Stanley challenged him. Gary L. Koniz and Deborah "Deb" Katz Pueschel also qualified as write-ins. Crenshaw won the race by a wide margin.

- Race ranking and details from CQ Politics
- Campaign Contributions from OpenSecrets
- Race profile at The New York Times

=== Predictions ===
Source	Ranking	As of
The Cook Political Report	Safe R	November 1, 2010
Rothenberg	Safe R	November 1, 2010
Sabato's Crystal Ball	Safe R	November 1, 2010
RCP	Safe R	November 1, 2010
CQ Politics	Safe R	October 28, 2010
New York Times	Safe R	November 1, 2010
FiveThirtyEight	Safe R	November 1, 2010

=== Results ===
Florida's 4th congressional district election, 2010
Party	Candidate	Votes	%
Republican	Ander Crenshaw (Incumbent)	175,162	77
Independent	Troy Stanley	51,620	23
Total votes		226,782	100
Republican hold			

== District 5 ==
2010 Florida's 5th congressional district election
- November 2, 2010
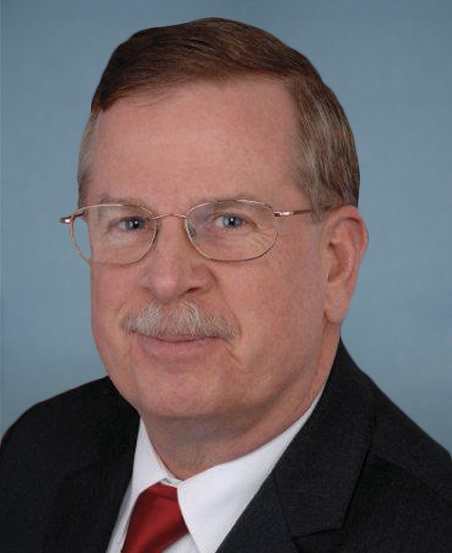

Nominee	Rich Nugent	Jim Piccillo
Party	Republican	Democratic
Popular vote	208,443	100,649
Percentage	67.44%	32.56%
- County results Nugent: 60–70% 70–80%
U.S. Representative before election
Ginny Brown-Waite
Republican
Elected U.S. Representative
Rich Nugent
Republican

This was an open seat, as Republican incumbent Ginny Brown-Waite retired, citing health reasons. Hernando County Sheriff Rich Nugent won the Republican primary to face Democratic businessman Jim Piccillo (campaign site, PVS, FEC), a former Republican and political novice. Nugent defeated Piccillo in the general election.

- Race ranking and details from CQ Politics
- Campaign Contributions from OpenSecrets
- Race profile at The New York Times

=== Predictions ===
Source	Ranking	As of
The Cook Political Report	Safe R	November 1, 2010
Rothenberg	Safe R	November 1, 2010
Sabato's Crystal Ball	Safe R	November 1, 2010
RCP	Safe R	November 1, 2010
CQ Politics	Safe R	October 28, 2010
New York Times	Safe R	November 1, 2010
FiveThirtyEight	Safe R	November 1, 2010

=== Results ===
Florida's 5th congressional district election, 2010
Party	Candidate	Votes	%
Republican	Rich Nugent	208,443	67
Democratic	Jim Piccillo	100,649	33
Total votes		309,092	100
Republican hold			

== District 6 ==
2010 Florida's 6th congressional district election
- November 2, 2010
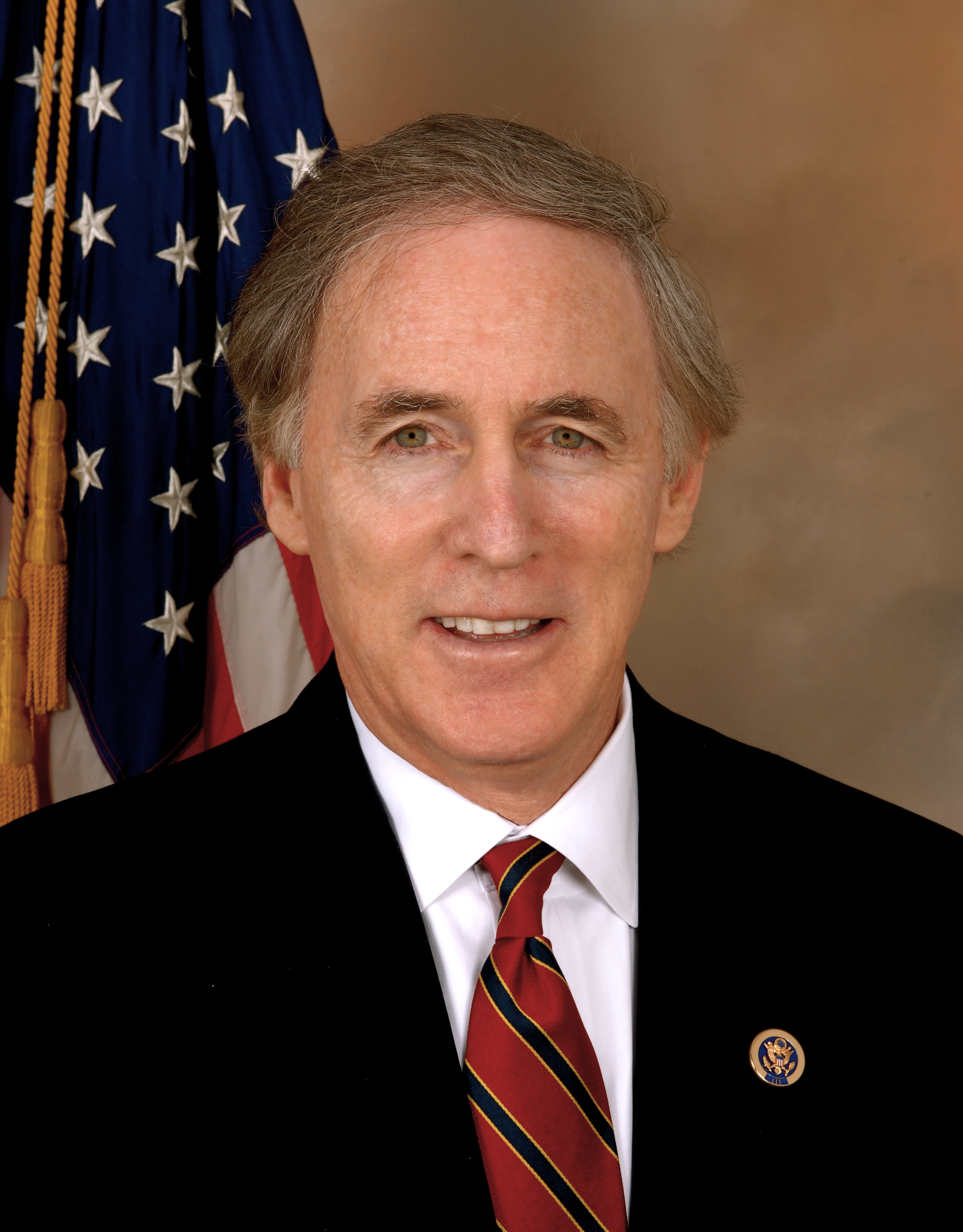

Nominee	Cliff Stearns	Steve Schonberg
Party	Republican	Independent
Popular vote	178,779	71,381
Percentage	71.47%	28.53%
- County results Stearns: 60–70% 70–80% 80–90%
U.S. Representative before election
Cliff Stearns
Republican
Elected U.S. Representative
Cliff Stearns
Republican

Republican incumbent Cliff Stearns has held this seat since 1989. He was challenged by Independent candidate Steve Schonberg (campaign site, PVS).

Stearns won against Don Browning (campaign site, PVS) in the Republican primary.

On October 19, 2009, the Florida Whig Party announced that John Annarumma would be their nominee, but he later dropped out. Stearns won the general election with 71% of the vote.

- Race ranking and details from CQ Politics
- Campaign Contributions from OpenSecrets
- Race profile at The New York Times

=== Predictions ===
Source	Ranking	As of
The Cook Political Report	Safe R	November 1, 2010
Rothenberg	Safe R	November 1, 2010
Sabato's Crystal Ball	Safe R	November 1, 2010
RCP	Safe R	November 1, 2010
CQ Politics	Safe R	October 28, 2010
New York Times	Safe R	November 1, 2010
FiveThirtyEight	Safe R	November 1, 2010

=== Results ===
Florida's 6th congressional district election, 2010
Party	Candidate	Votes	%
Republican	Cliff Stearns (Incumbent)	178,779	71
Independent	Steve Schonberg	71,381	29
Total votes		250,160	100
Republican hold			

== District 7 ==
2010 Florida's 7th congressional district election
- November 2, 2010
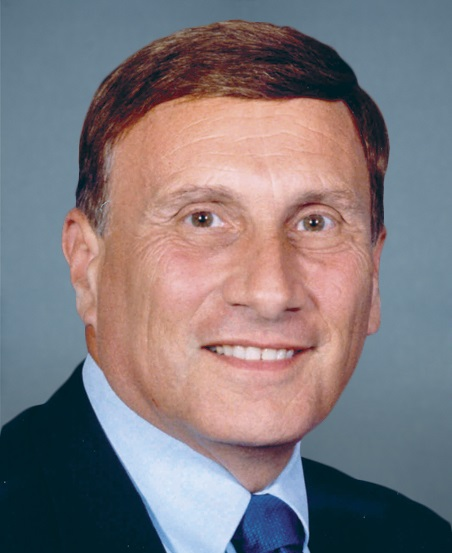

Nominee	John Mica	Heather Beaven
Party	Republican	Democratic
Popular vote	184,868	82,999
Percentage	69.01%	30.99%
- County results Mica: 60–70% 70–80%
U.S. Representative before election
John Mica
Republican
Elected U.S. Representative
John Mica
Republican

Republican incumbent John Mica has held this district since 1993, and ran for re-election. He was challenged by Democratic nominee Palm Coast Navy veteran and nonprofit CEO Heather Beaven (campaign site, PVS, FEC).

Both Mica and Beaven ran unopposed in their respective primary elections. Peter Silva (campaign site) dropped out earlier. 2008 candidate Faye Armitage considered re-running, but decided against it.

Florida Whig Party candidate Stephen J. Bacon (campaign site) also ran. Mica was easily reelected.

- Race ranking and details from CQ Politics
- Campaign Contributions from OpenSecrets
- Race profile at The New York Times

=== Predictions ===
Source	Ranking	As of
The Cook Political Report	Safe R	November 1, 2010
Rothenberg	Safe R	November 1, 2010
Sabato's Crystal Ball	Safe R	November 1, 2010
RCP	Safe R	November 1, 2010
CQ Politics	Safe R	October 28, 2010
New York Times	Safe R	November 1, 2010
FiveThirtyEight	Safe R	November 1, 2010

=== Results ===
Florida's 7th congressional district election, 2010
Party	Candidate	Votes	%
Republican	John Mica (Incumbent)	184,868	69
Democratic	Heather Beaven	82,999	31
Total votes		267,867	100
Republican hold			

== District 8 ==
2010 Florida's 8th congressional district election
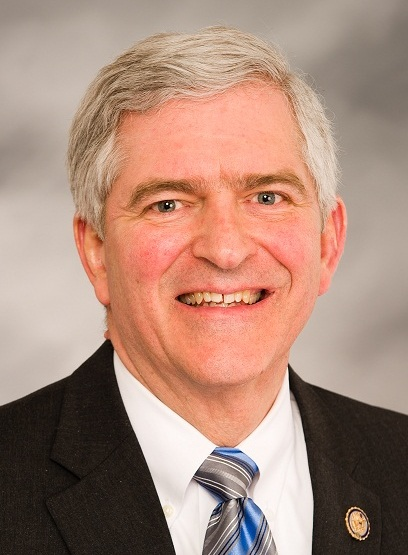

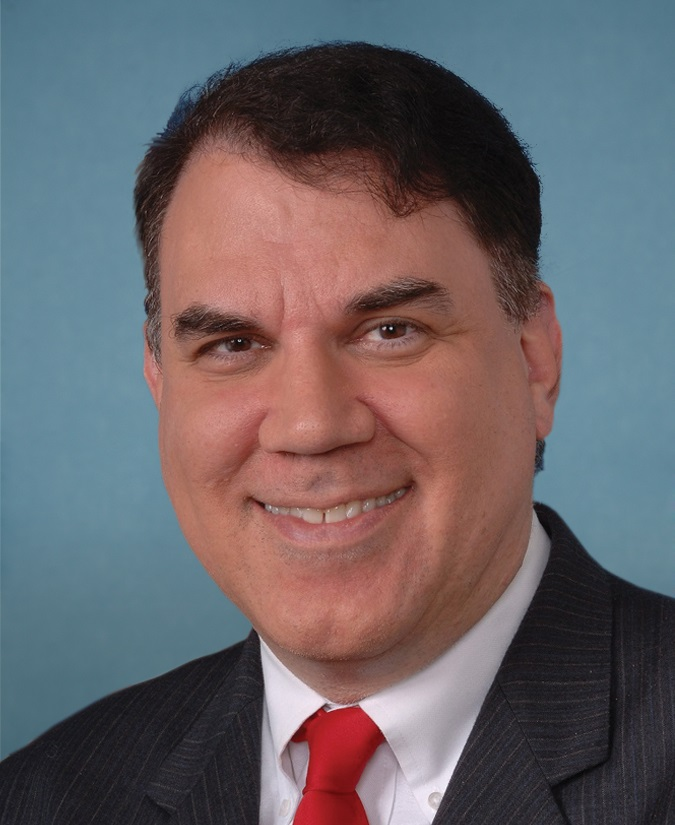
Nominee	Daniel Webster	Alan Grayson
Party	Republican	Democratic
Popular vote	123,464	84,167
Percentage	56.1%	38.2%
- County results Webster: 50–60% 60–70%
U.S. Representative before election
Alan Grayson
Democratic
Elected U.S. Representative
Daniel Webster
Republican

Democratic incumbent Alan Grayson was defeated by Republican nominee former State Senate Majority Leader and Speaker of the Florida House of Representatives Daniel Webster. TEA Party candidate Peg Dunmire (campaign site, PVS), and Independent George L. Metcalfe (campaign sitePVS were on the ballot, and Florida Whig Party Steven J. Gerritzen (campaign site), qualified as a write-in candidate.

Grayson ran unopposed in the Democratic primary. In the Republican primary, Webster defeated Ross Bieling; Dan Fanelli, a former pilot; State Representative Kurt Kelly; 2008 GOP candidate Todd Long; Bruce O'Donoghue, businessman; and Patricia Sullivan, GOP activist.

- Race ranking and details from CQ Politics
- Campaign Contributions from OpenSecrets
- Race profile at The New York Times

=== Polling ===
Poll Source	Dates Administered	Alan Grayson (D)	Daniel Webster (R)	Other
Voter Survey Service	October 22–25, 2010	41%	48%	5%
OnMessage, Inc.	October, 2010	30%	46%	-
Voter Survey Service	September 25–27, 2010	36%	43%	11%
Public Policy Polling	August 23–25, 2010	40%	27%	23%

==== Predictions ====
Source	Ranking	As of
The Cook Political Report	Likely R (flip)	November 1, 2010
Rothenberg	Likely R (flip)	November 1, 2010
Sabato's Crystal Ball	Lean R (flip)	November 1, 2010
RCP	Lean R (flip)	November 1, 2010
CQ Politics	Lean R (flip)	October 28, 2010
New York Times	Lean R (flip)	November 1, 2010
FiveThirtyEight	Likely R (flip)	November 1, 2010

=== Results ===
Florida's 8th congressional district election, 2010
Party	Candidate	Votes	%
Republican	Daniel Webster	123,464	56.1
Democratic	Alan Grayson (Incumbent)	84,036	38.2
TEA	Peg Dunmire	8,324	4
Independent	George Metcalfe	4,140	2
Total votes		219,964	100
Republican gain from Democratic			

== District 9 ==
2010 Florida's 9th congressional district election
- November 2, 2010
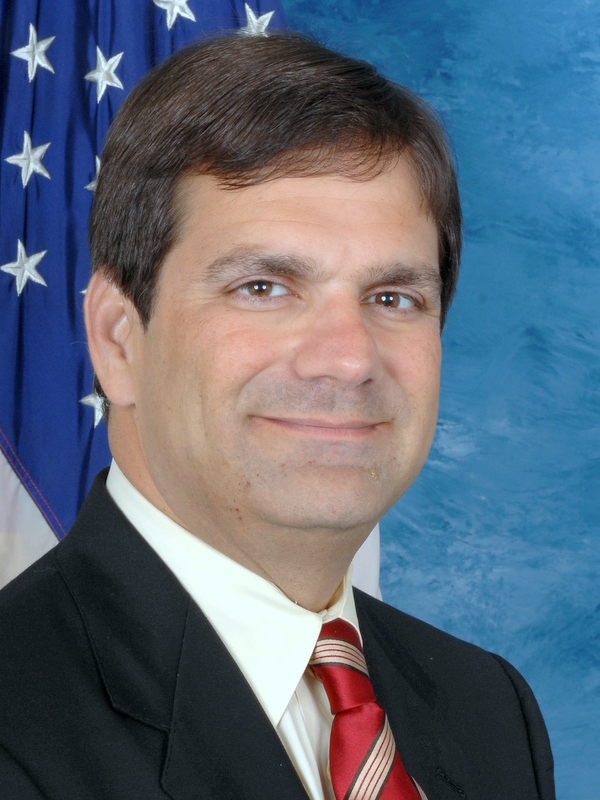

Nominee	Gus Bilirakis	Anita dePalma
Party	Republican	Democratic
Popular vote	162,891	65,295
Percentage	71.39%	28.61%
- County results Bilirakis: 70–80%
U.S. Representative before election
Gus Bilirakis
Republican
Elected U.S. Representative
Gus Bilirakis
Republican

Republican Gus Bilirakis ran for re-election, having first won election in 2007 to replace his father, Michael Bilirakis, who had served the previous 23 years. Anita dePalma (campaign site, PVS) defeated Phil Hindahl (campaign site, PVS) in the Democratic primary election. Bilirakis was reelected with 71% of the vote.

- Race ranking and details from CQ Politics
- Campaign Contributions from OpenSecrets
- Race profile at The New York Times

=== Predictions ===
Source	Ranking	As of
The Cook Political Report	Safe R	November 1, 2010
Rothenberg	Safe R	November 1, 2010
Sabato's Crystal Ball	Safe R	November 1, 2010
RCP	Safe R	November 1, 2010
CQ Politics	Safe R	October 28, 2010
New York Times	Safe R	November 1, 2010
FiveThirtyEight	Safe R	November 1, 2010

=== Results ===
Florida's 9th congressional district election, 2010
Party	Candidate	Votes	%
Republican	Gus Bilirakis (Incumbent)	162,891	71
Democratic	Anita dePalma	65,295	29
Total votes		228,186	100
Republican hold			

== District 10 ==
2010 Florida's 10th congressional district election
- November 2, 2010
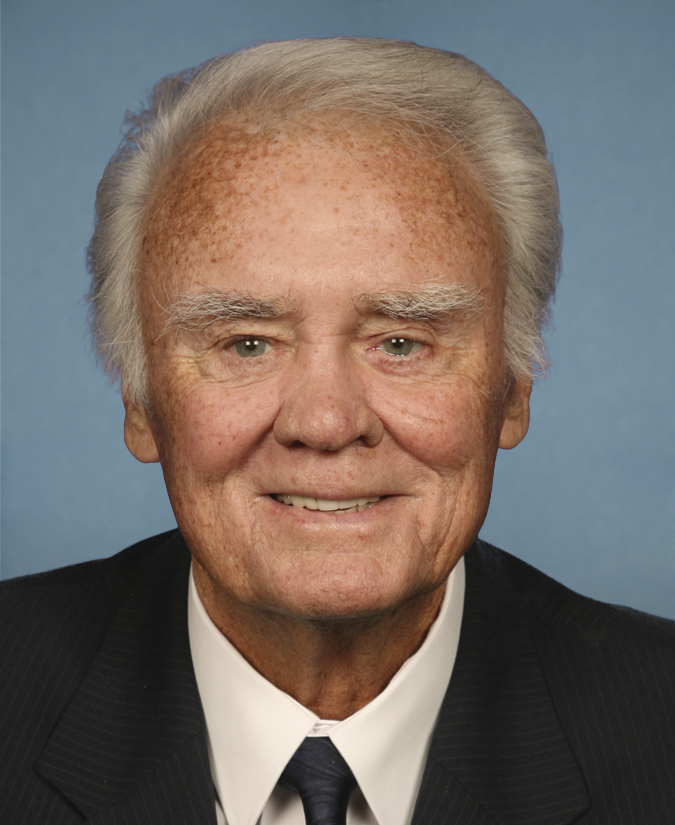

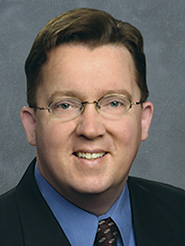
Nominee	Bill Young	Charlie Justice
Party	Republican	Democratic
Popular vote	137,837	71,228
Percentage	66.19%	34.07%
- County results Young: 60–70%
U.S. Representative before election
Bill Young
Republican
Elected U.S. Representative
Bill Young
Republican

Republican incumbent Bill Young was challenged by Democratic nominee State Senator Charlie Justice. Martin Rokicki qualified to run as a write-in candidate.

Young, who has represented this district since 1971 and is currently the longest-serving Republican in the House, ran unopposed in the Republican primary, local tea party activist Eric Forcade having withdrawn. Justice also ran unopposed in the Democratic primary. Young was reelected to a 21st term.

- Race ranking and details from CQ Politics
- Campaign Contributions from OpenSecrets
- Race profile at The New York Times

=== Predictions ===
Source	Ranking	As of
The Cook Political Report	Safe R	November 1, 2010
Rothenberg	Safe R	November 1, 2010
Sabato's Crystal Ball	Safe R	November 1, 2010
RCP	Safe R	November 1, 2010
CQ Politics	Safe R	October 28, 2010
New York Times	Safe R	November 1, 2010
FiveThirtyEight	Safe R	November 1, 2010

=== Results ===
Florida's 10th congressional district election, 2010
Party	Candidate	Votes	%
Republican	Bill Young (Incumbent)	137,837	66
Democratic	Charlie Justice	71,228	34
Total votes		209,065	100
Republican hold			

== District 11 ==
2010 Florida's 11th congressional district election
- November 2, 2010
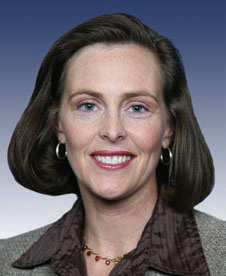

Nominee	Kathy Castor	Mike Prendergast
Party	Democratic	Republican
Popular vote	89,211	60,033
Percentage	59.78%	40.22%
- County results Castor: 50–60% 70–80% 80–90%
U.S. Representative before election
Kathy Castor
Democratic
Elected U.S. Representative
Kathy Castor
Democratic

Democratic incumbent Kathy Castor was challenged by Republican nominee Mike Prendergast (campaign site, PVS). Castor has held the seat since 2006. Castor was reelected with 60% of the vote.

- Race ranking and details from CQ Politics
- Campaign Contributions from OpenSecrets
- Race profile at The New York Times

=== Predictions ===
Source	Ranking	As of
The Cook Political Report	Safe D	November 1, 2010
Rothenberg	Safe D	November 1, 2010
Sabato's Crystal Ball	Safe D	November 1, 2010
RCP	Safe D	November 1, 2010
CQ Politics	Safe D	October 28, 2010
New York Times	Safe D	November 1, 2010
FiveThirtyEight	Safe D	November 1, 2010

=== Results ===
Florida's 11th congressional district election, 2010
Party	Candidate	Votes	%
Democratic	Kathy Castor (Incumbent)	89,211	60
Republican	Mike Prendergast	60,033	40
Total votes		149,244	100
Democratic hold			

== District 12 ==
2010 Florida's 12th congressional district election
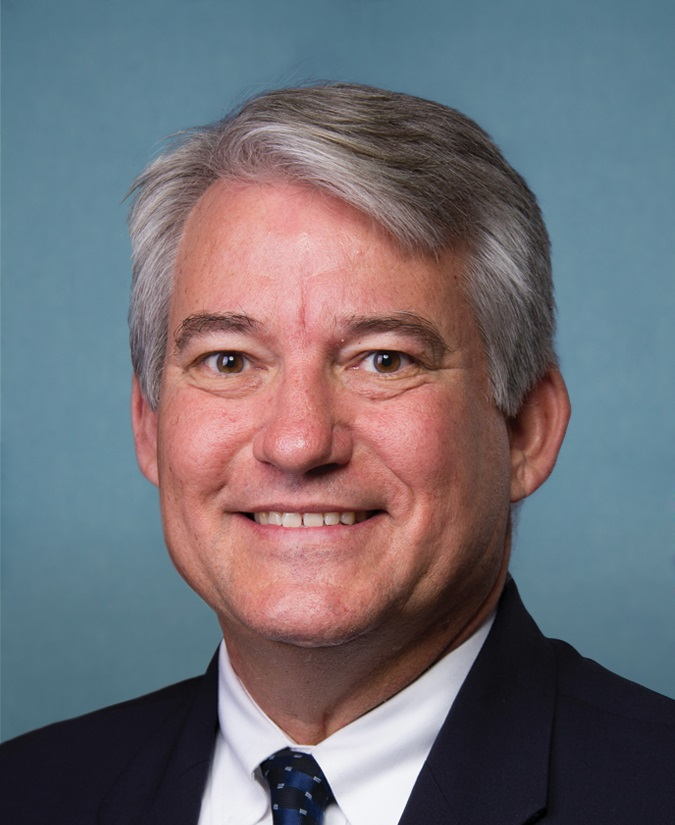

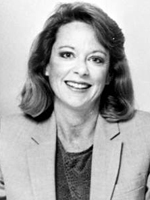

Nominee	Dennis Ross	Lori Edwards	Randy Wilkerson
Party	Republican	Democratic	Tea Party
Popular vote	102,704	86,515	22,857
Percentage	48.1%	41.1%	10.7%
- County results Ross: 40–50% 50–60% Edwards: 70–80%
U.S. Representative before election
Adam Putnam
Republican
Elected U.S. Representative
Dennis Ross
Republican

This was an open seat as Republican incumbent Adam Putnam ran for Florida Commissioner of Agriculture. Democratic nominee Polk County Elections Supervisor Lori Edwards (campaign site, PVS), Republican nominee former State Representative Dennis Ross (campaign site, PVS), and Tea Party nominee Polk County Commissioner Randy Wilkinson (campaign site, PVS) were on the general election ballot.

Edwards won against retired United States Navy chief Doug Tudor (campaign site, PVS) in the Democratic primary. Ross won against John W. Lindsey, Jr. in the Republican primary. Wilkinson ran unopposed.

Ross won the general election with 48% of the vote; Edwards garnered 41%, and 11% of the voters chose Wilkinson.

- Race ranking and details from CQ Politics
- Campaign Contributions from OpenSecrets
- Race profile at The New York Times

=== Polling ===
Poll Source	Dates Administered	Dennis Ross (R)	Lori Edwards (D)	Randy Wilkinson (T)
Greenberg Quinlan Rosner Research†	July 26–28, 2010	32%	35%	20%
Greenberg Quinlan Rosner Research†	November 17–19, 2009	42%	46%	-

†Internal poll commissioned for Edwards campaign

==== Predictions ====
Source	Ranking	As of
The Cook Political Report	Lean R	November 1, 2010
Rothenberg	Tilt R	November 1, 2010
Sabato's Crystal Ball	Lean R	November 1, 2010
RCP	Lean R	November 1, 2010
CQ Politics	Lean R	October 28, 2010
New York Times	Safe R	November 1, 2010
FiveThirtyEight	Likely R	November 1, 2010

=== Results ===
Florida's 12th congressional district election, 2010
Party	Candidate	Votes	%
Republican	Dennis Ross	102,704	48.1
Democratic	Lori Edwards	87,769	41.1
Independent	Randy Wilkinson	22,857	10.7
Total votes		213,330	100
Republican hold			

== District 13 ==
2010 Florida's 13th congressional district election
- November 2, 2010
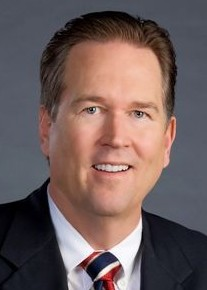

Nominee	Vern Buchanan	James Golden
Party	Republican	Democratic
Popular vote	183,811	83,123
Percentage	68.86%	31.14%
- County results Buchanan: 60–70% 70–80%
U.S. Representative before election
Vern Buchanan
Republican
Elected U.S. Representative
Vern Buchanan
Republican

Republican incumbent Vern Buchanan successfully ran for reelection, challenged by Democratic nominee The Reverend James T. Golden (campaign site, PVS).

Buchanan won against Don Baldauf (campaign site, PVS) in the Republican primary. Golden won against Rick Eaton (campaign site, PVS) in the Democratic primary.

- Race ranking and details from CQ Politics
- Campaign Contributions from OpenSecrets
- Race profile at The New York Times
- Republican Primary Debate video

=== Predictions ===
Source	Ranking	As of
The Cook Political Report	Safe R	November 1, 2010
Rothenberg	Safe R	November 1, 2010
Sabato's Crystal Ball	Safe R	November 1, 2010
RCP	Safe R	November 1, 2010
CQ Politics	Safe R	October 28, 2010
New York Times	Safe R	November 1, 2010
FiveThirtyEight	Safe R	November 1, 2010

=== Results ===
2010 13th Congressional District of Florida Elections
Party	Candidate	Votes	%
Republican	Vern Buchanan (incumbent)	183,811	68.9
Democratic	James T. Golden	83,123	31.1
Republican hold			

== District 14 ==
2010 Florida's 14th congressional district election
- November 2, 2010
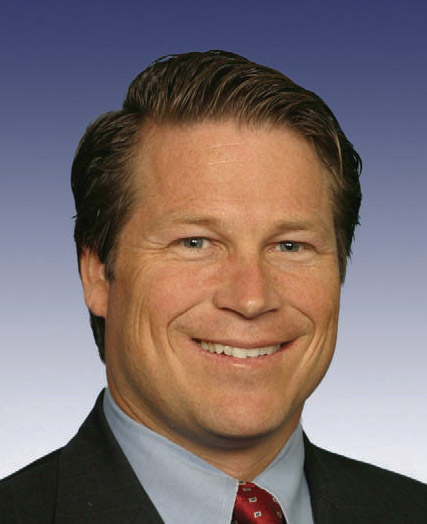

Nominee	Connie Mack IV	James Lloyd Roach
Party	Republican	Democratic
Popular vote	188,341	74,525
Percentage	68.56%	27.13%
- County results Mack: 60–70% 70–80%
U.S. Representative before election
Connie Mack IV
Republican
Elected U.S. Representative
Connie Mack IV
Republican

Republican incumbent Connie Mack was challenged by Democratic nominee Jim Roach (campaign site, PVS) and Independent William Maverick Saint Claire (PVS). Mack was reelected in the general election.

In 2008, McCain won 57% of the vote.

- Race ranking and details from CQ Politics
- Campaign Contributions from OpenSecrets
- Race profile at The New York Times

=== Predictions ===
Source	Ranking	As of
The Cook Political Report	Safe R	November 1, 2010
Rothenberg	Safe R	November 1, 2010
Sabato's Crystal Ball	Safe R	November 1, 2010
RCP	Safe R	November 1, 2010
CQ Politics	Safe R	October 28, 2010
New York Times	Safe R	November 1, 2010
FiveThirtyEight	Safe R	November 1, 2010

=== Results ===
2010 14th Congressional District of Florida Elections
Party	Candidate	Votes	%
Republican	Connie Mack IV (incumbent)	188,341	68.6
Democratic	James Lloyd Roach	74,525	27.1
Independent	William St. Claire	11,825	4.3
Republican hold			

== District 15 ==
2010 Florida's 15th congressional district election
- November 2, 2010
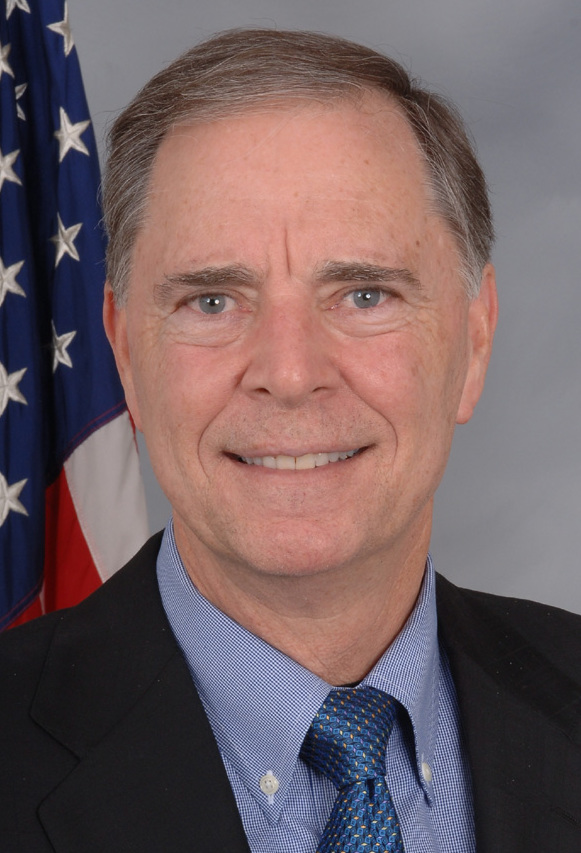

Nominee	Bill Posey	Shannon Roberts
Party	Republican	Democratic
Popular vote	157,079	85,595
Percentage	64.73%	35.27%
- County results Posey: 50–60% 60–70% 70–80%
U.S. Representative before election
Bill Posey
Republican
Elected U.S. Representative
Bill Posey
Republican

First term Republican incumbent Bill Posey was reelected, defeating Democratic nominee former NASA executive and public administrator Shannon Roberts (campaign site, PVS). Both ran unopposed in their respective primary elections.

- Race ranking and details from CQ Politics
- Campaign Contributions from OpenSecrets
- Race profile at The New York Times

=== Predictions ===
Source	Ranking	As of
The Cook Political Report	Safe R	November 1, 2010
Rothenberg	Safe R	November 1, 2010
Sabato's Crystal Ball	Safe R	November 1, 2010
RCP	Safe R	November 1, 2010
CQ Politics	Safe R	October 28, 2010
New York Times	Safe R	November 1, 2010
FiveThirtyEight	Safe R	November 1, 2010

=== Results ===
2010 15th Congressional District of Florida Elections
Party	Candidate	Votes	%
Republican	Bill Posey (incumbent)	157,079	64.7
Democratic	Shannon Roberts	85,595	35.3
Republican hold			

== District 16 ==
2010 Florida's 16th congressional district election
- November 2, 2010
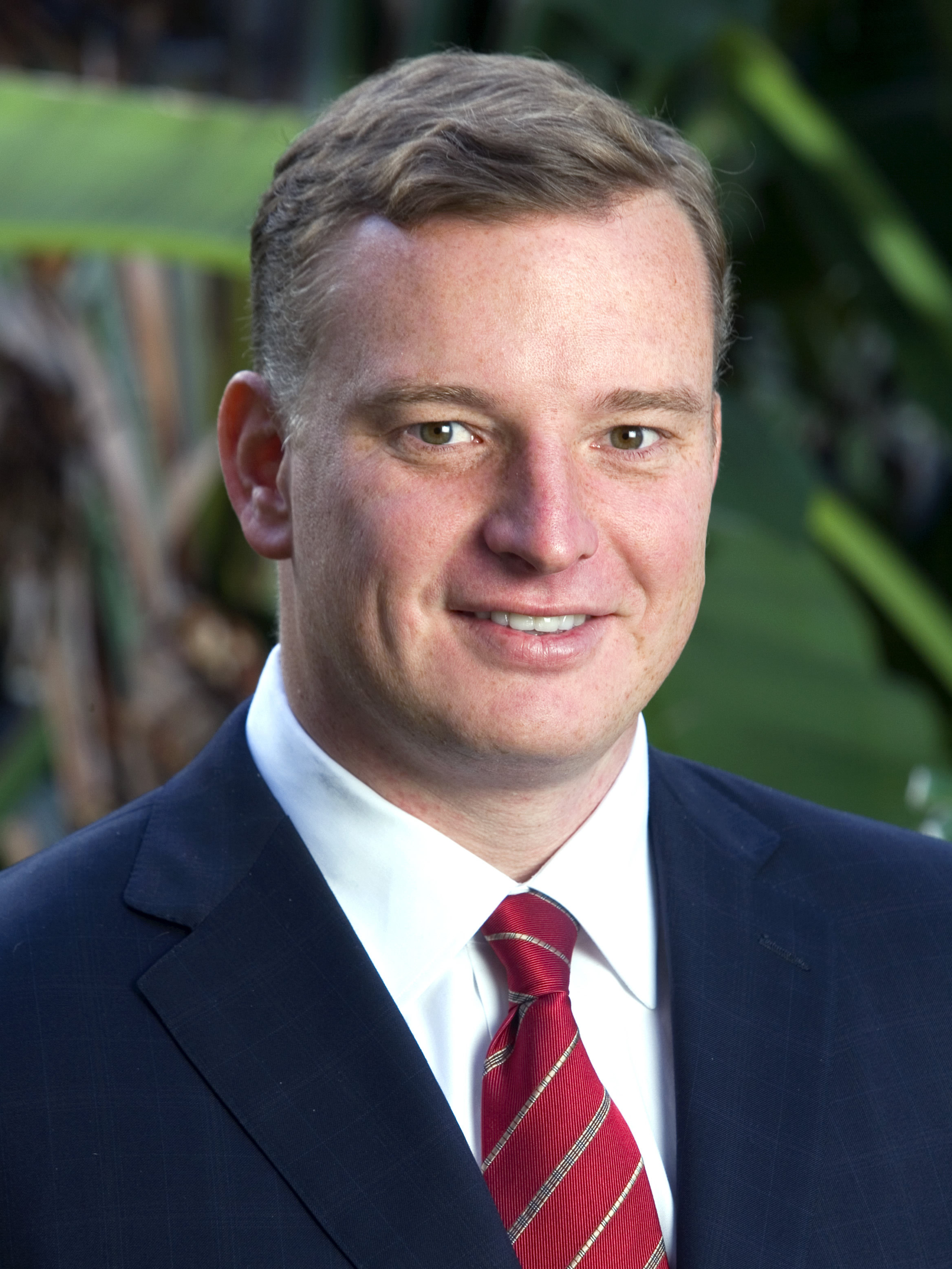

Nominee	Tom Rooney	Jim Horn
Party	Republican	Democratic
Popular vote	162,285	80,321
Percentage	66.89%	33.11%
- County results Rooney: 60–70% 70–80%
U.S. Representative before election
Tom Rooney
Republican
Elected U.S. Representative
Tom Rooney
Republican

First term Republican incumbent Tom Rooney ran for re-election, challenged by Democratic nominee Jim Horn (campaign site, PVS). William Dean has qualified as a write-in candidate. Rooney prevailed in the general election.

Rooney ran unopposed in the Republican primary. Horn won against Ed Tautiva (campaign site, PVS) in the Democratic primary. St. Lucie County Commissioner Christopher Craft dropped out on March 26, 2010.

Rooney's predecessor Tim Mahoney, and Mahoney's predecessor Mark Foley, were both involved in scandals.

- Race ranking and details from CQ Politics
- Campaign Contributions from OpenSecrets
- Race profile at The New York Times

=== Predictions ===
Source	Ranking	As of
The Cook Political Report	Safe R	November 1, 2010
Rothenberg	Safe R	November 1, 2010
Sabato's Crystal Ball	Safe R	November 1, 2010
RCP	Safe R	November 1, 2010
CQ Politics	Safe R	October 28, 2010
New York Times	Safe R	November 1, 2010
FiveThirtyEight	Safe R	November 1, 2010

=== Results ===
2010 16th Congressional District of Florida Elections
Party	Candidate	Votes	%
Republican	Tom Rooney (incumbent)	162,285	66.8
Democratic	Jim Horn	80,327	33.1
Republican hold			

== District 17 ==
2010 Florida's 17th congressional district election
- November 2, 2010
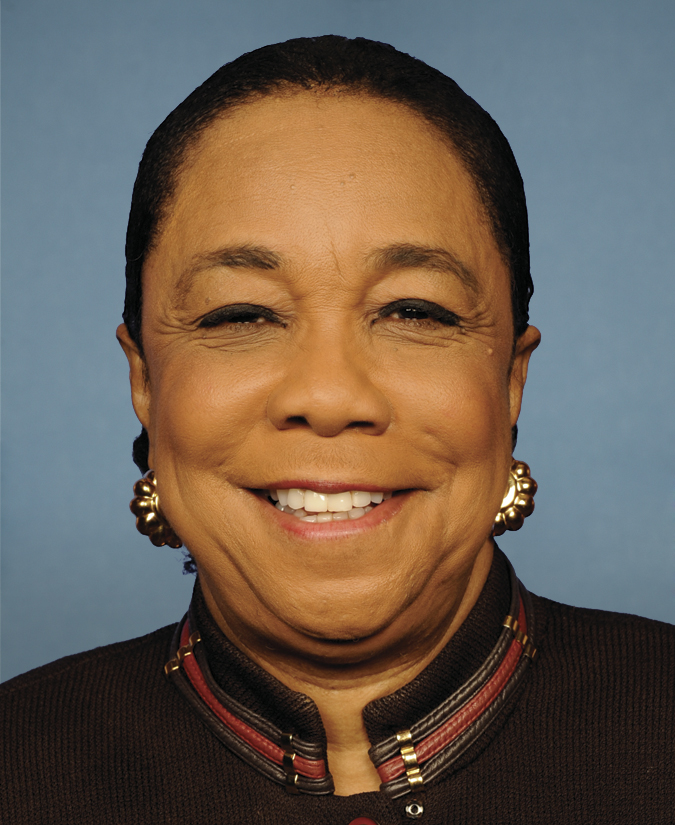

Nominee	Frederica Wilson	Roderick Vereen
Party	Democratic	Independent
Popular vote	106,361	17,009
Percentage	86.21%	13.79%
- County results Wilson: 70–80% 80–90%
U.S. Representative before election
Kendrick Meek
Democratic
Elected U.S. Representative
Frederica Wilson
Democratic

This was an open seat, as Democratic incumbent Kendrick Meek ran for the U.S. Senate. Democratic nominee State Senator Frederica Wilson ran against Independent attorney Roderick D. Vereen (campaign site, PVS).

Wilson won the Democratic primary, running against community activist and executive director of FANM (Haitian Women of Miami) Marleine Bastien (campaign site, PVS), former State Representative Phillip Brutus, State Representative James Bush III, North Miami Councilman Scott Galvin (campaign site, PVS), Miami Gardens Mayor Shirley Gibson (campaign site, PVS), physician Rudy Moise (campaign site, PVS), State Representative Yolly Roberson, and Miami Gardens City Councilman and attorney Andre Williams (campaign site, PVS). The Miami Herald newspaper endorsed Shirley Gibson in the Democratic primary.

Teacher Corey Poitier was the lone announced Republican candidate, but he dropped out.

Wilson won 86.2% of the vote in the general election.

- Race ranking and details from CQ Politics
- Campaign Contributions from OpenSecrets
- Race profile at The New York Times
- US House District 17: The candidates, Carrie Wells, The Miami Herald/South Florida Sun-Sentinel, August 9, 2010
- 9 Democrats seek Kendrick Meek's US House seat, Jennifer Kay/AP, The Miami Herald, August 19, 2010

=== Predictions ===
Source	Ranking	As of
The Cook Political Report	Safe D	November 1, 2010
Rothenberg	Safe D	November 1, 2010
Sabato's Crystal Ball	Safe D	November 1, 2010
RCP	Safe D	November 1, 2010
CQ Politics	Safe D	October 28, 2010
New York Times	Safe D	November 1, 2010
FiveThirtyEight	Safe D	November 1, 2010

=== Results ===
2010 17th Congressional District of Florida Elections
Party	Candidate	Votes	%
Democratic	Frederica Wilson	106,361	86.2
Independent	Roderick D. Vereen	17,009	13.8
Democratic hold			

== District 18 ==
2010 Florida's 18th congressional district election
- November 2, 2010
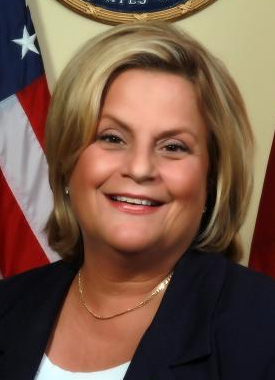

Nominee	Ileana Ros-Lehtinen	Rolando Banciella
Party	Republican	Democratic
Popular vote	102,360	46,235
Percentage	68.89%	31.11%
- County results Ros-Lehtinen: 60–70%
U.S. Representative before election
Ileana Ros-Lehtinen
Republican
Elected U.S. Representative
Ileana Ros-Lehtinen
Republican

Republican incumbent Ileana Ros-Lehtinen had held this seat since 1989, and was challenged by Rolando A. Banciella (campaign site, PVS). Both ran unopposed in their respective primaries. Ros-Lehtinen won the general election.

- Race ranking and details from CQ Politics
- Campaign Contributions from OpenSecrets
- Race profile at The New York Times

=== Predictions ===
Source	Ranking	As of
The Cook Political Report	Safe R	November 1, 2010
Rothenberg	Safe R	November 1, 2010
Sabato's Crystal Ball	Safe R	November 1, 2010
RCP	Safe R	November 1, 2010
CQ Politics	Safe R	October 28, 2010
New York Times	Safe R	November 1, 2010
FiveThirtyEight	Safe R	November 1, 2010

=== Results ===
2010 18th Congressional District of Florida Elections
Party	Candidate	Votes	%
Republican	Ileana Ros-Lehtinen (incumbent)	102,360	68.9
Democratic	Rolando A. Banciella	46,235	31.1%
Republican hold			

== District 19 ==
2010 Florida's 19th congressional district election
- November 2, 2010
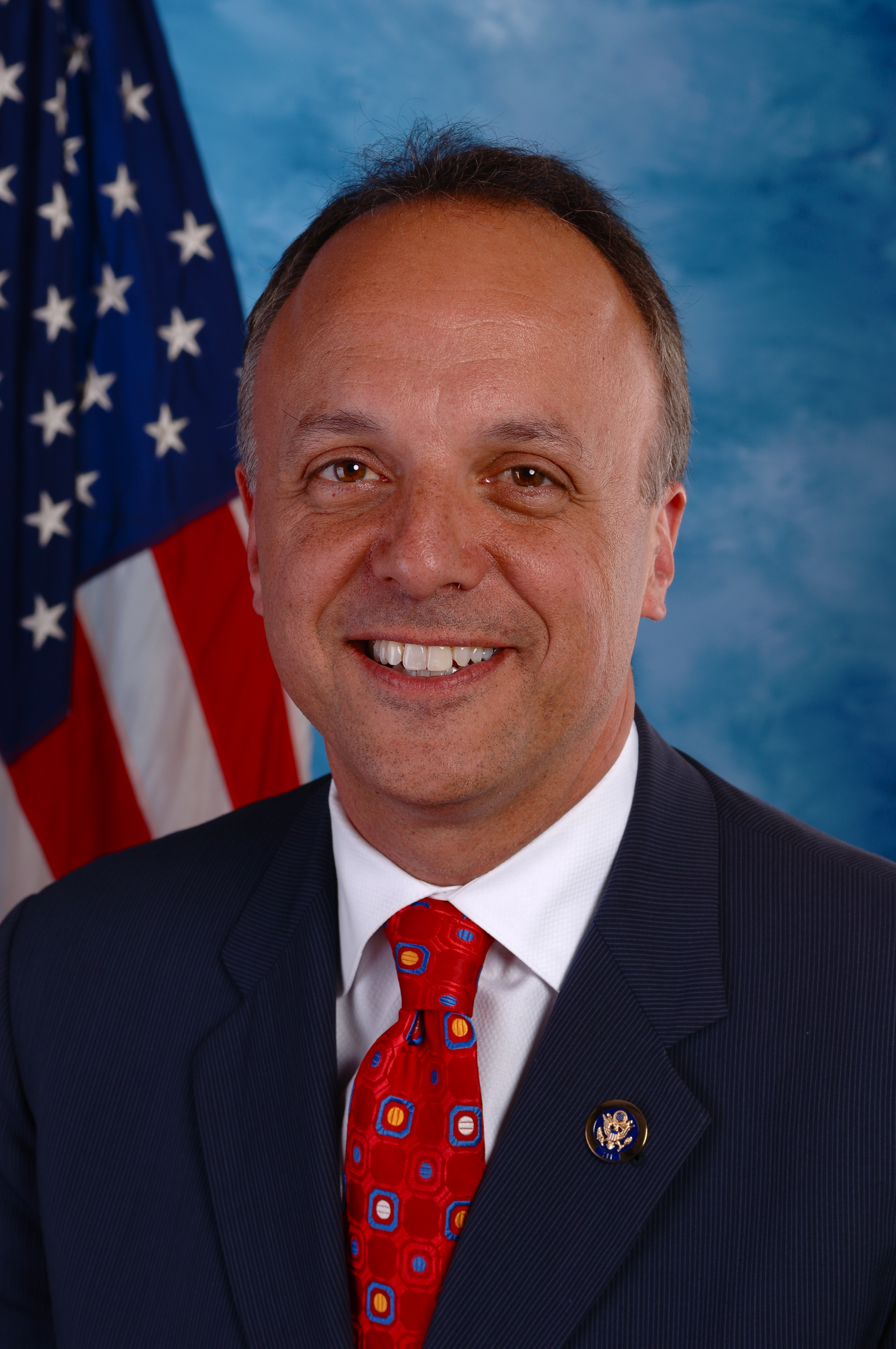

Nominee	Ted Deutch	Joe Budd
Party	Democratic	Republican
Popular vote	132,098	78,733
Percentage	62.66%	37.34%
- County results Deutch: 60–70%
U.S. Representative before election
Ted Deutch
Democratic
Elected U.S. Representative
Ted Deutch
Democratic

Democrat Robert Wexler resigned on January 3, 2010, to become president of the Washington-based Center for Middle East Peace and Economic Cooperation. His seat was filled by Ted Deutch, the winner of a special election, held on April 13. Deutch faced Joe Budd (campaign site, PVS), running unopposed in the Republican primary, along with write-in candidate Stan Smilan (campaign site) in the general election. Deutsch was easily re-elected.

- Race ranking and details from CQ Politics
- Campaign Contributions from OpenSecrets
- Race profile at The New York Times

=== Predictions ===
Source	Ranking	As of
The Cook Political Report	Safe D	November 1, 2010
Rothenberg	Safe D	November 1, 2010
Sabato's Crystal Ball	Safe D	November 1, 2010
RCP	Safe D	November 1, 2010
CQ Politics	Safe D	October 28, 2010
New York Times	Safe D	November 1, 2010
FiveThirtyEight	Safe D	November 1, 2010

=== Results ===
2010 19th Congressional District of Florida Elections
Party	Candidate	Votes	%
Democratic	Ted Deutch (incumbent)	132,098	62.6
Republican	Joe Budd	78,733	37.3
Democratic hold			

== District 20 ==
2010 Florida's 20th congressional district election
- November 2, 2010
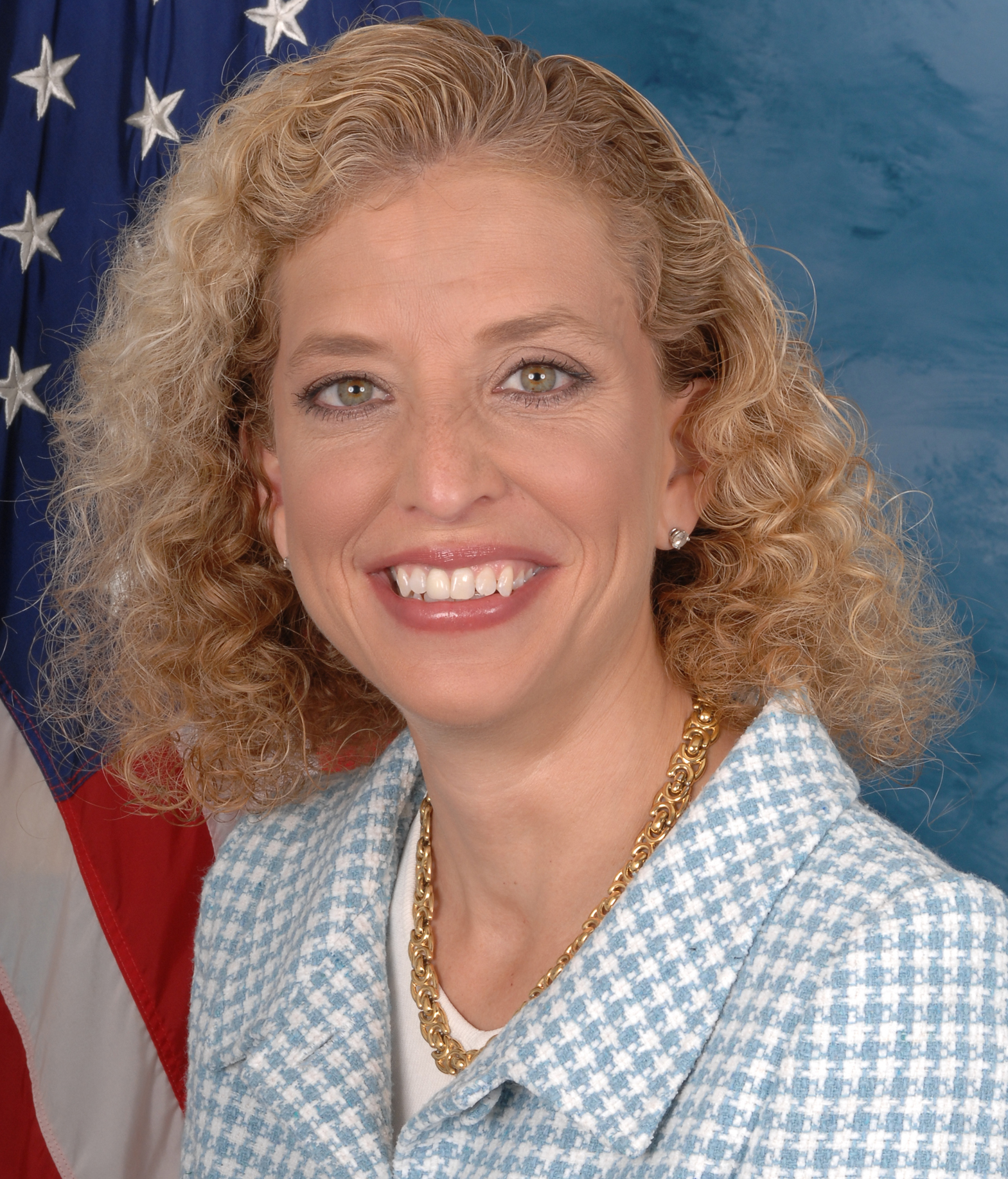

Nominee	Debbie Wasserman Schultz	Karen Harrington
Party	Democratic	Republican
Popular vote	100,787	63,845
Percentage	61.22%	38.78%
- County results Schultz: 50–60% 60–70%
U.S. Representative before election
Debbie Wasserman Schultz
Democratic
Elected U.S. Representative
Debbie Wasserman Schultz
Democratic

Incumbent Democrat Debbie Wasserman Schultz was challenged by Republican nominee businesswoman Karen Harrington (campaign site, PVS) of Davie. Independents Stanley Blumenthal (campaign site, PVS) and Bob Kunst (campaign site, PVS) were also running. Florida Whig Party candidate Clayton Schock (campaign site) ran as a write-in. Wasserman Schultz was re-elected.

Wasserman Schultz ran unopposed in the Democratic primary. Harrington won against businessman Robert Lowry (campaign site, PVS) of Hollywood, and trans woman Donna Milo (campaign site, PVS).

- Race ranking and details from CQ Politics
- Campaign Contributions from OpenSecrets
- Race profile at The New York Times

=== Predictions ===
Source	Ranking	As of
The Cook Political Report	Safe D	November 1, 2010
Rothenberg	Safe D	November 1, 2010
Sabato's Crystal Ball	Safe D	November 1, 2010
RCP	Safe D	November 1, 2010
CQ Politics	Safe D	October 28, 2010
New York Times	Safe D	November 1, 2010
FiveThirtyEight	Safe D	November 1, 2010

=== Results ===
2010 20th Congressional District of Florida Elections
Party	Candidate	Votes	%
Democratic	Debbie Wasserman Schultz (incumbent)	100,787	60.1
Republican	Karen Harrington	63,845	38.1
Democratic hold			

== District 21 ==
2010 Florida's 21st congressional district election
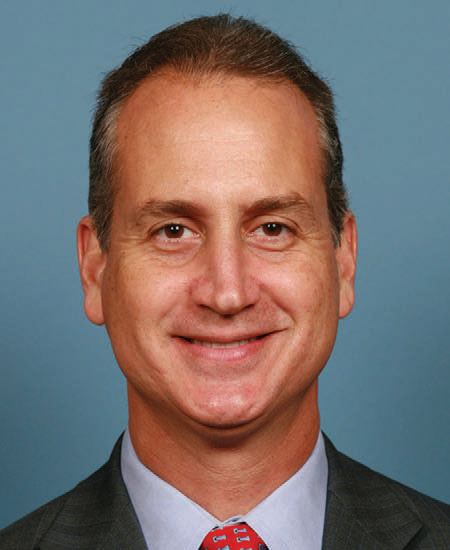
Nominee	Mario Díaz-Balart
Party	Republican
Popular vote	Unopposed
Percentage	N/A
U.S. Representative before election
Lincoln Díaz-Balart
Republican
Elected U.S. Representative
Mario Díaz-Balart
Republican

This district was an open election, as Republican incumbent Lincoln Diaz-Balart was retiring. His brother Mario Diaz-Balart, current Representative of the 25th District, ran unopposed for this seat on November 2, 2010.

- Race ranking and details from CQ Politics
- Campaign Contributions from OpenSecrets
- Race profile at The New York Times

=== Predictions ===
Source	Ranking	As of
The Cook Political Report	Safe R	November 1, 2010
Rothenberg	Safe R	November 1, 2010
Sabato's Crystal Ball	Safe R	November 1, 2010
RCP	Safe R	November 1, 2010
CQ Politics	Safe R	October 28, 2010
New York Times	Safe R	November 1, 2010
FiveThirtyEight	Safe R	November 1, 2010

== District 22 ==
2010 Florida's 22nd congressional district election
- November 2, 2010
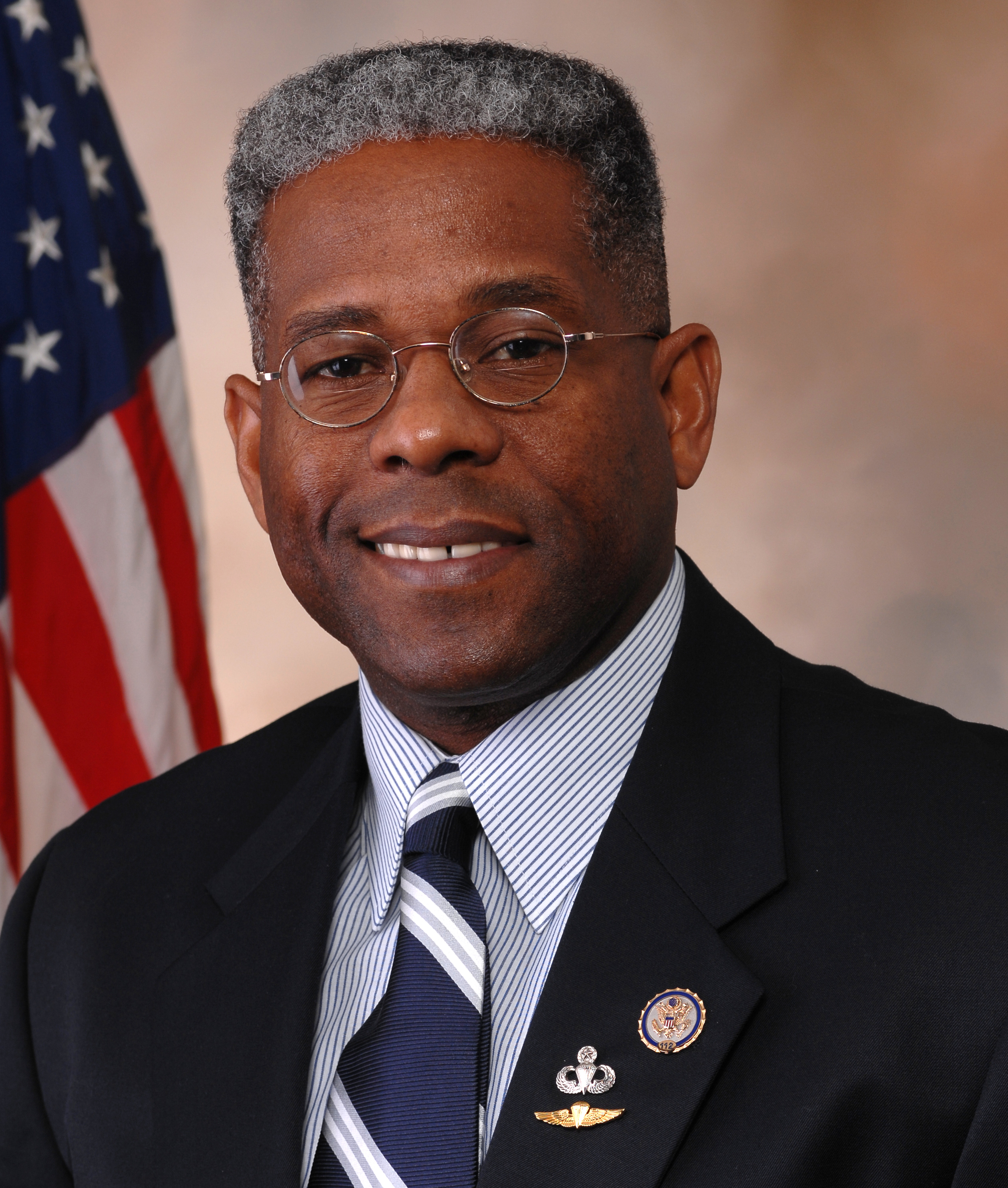

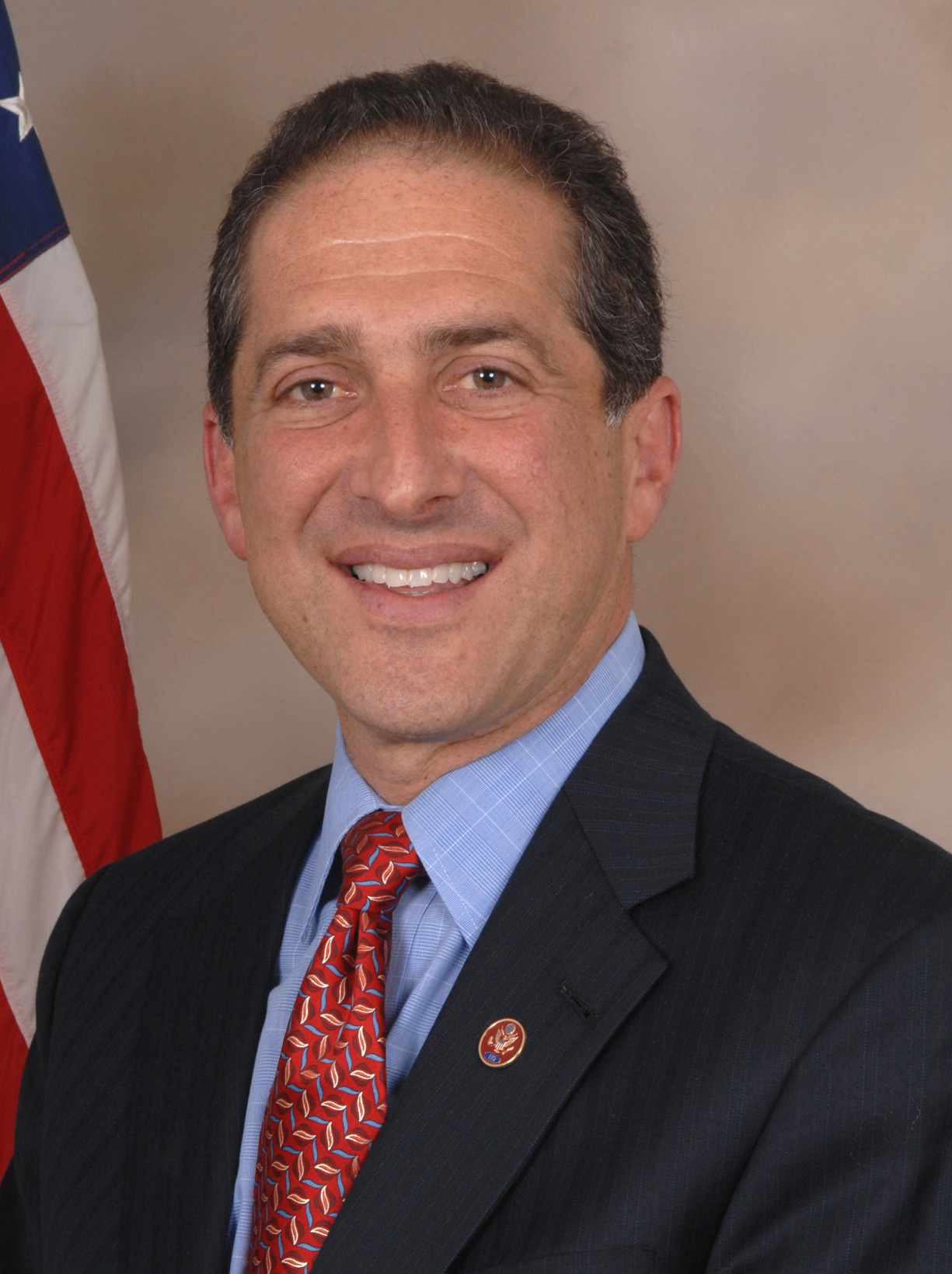
Nominee	Allen West	Ron Klein
Party	Republican	Democratic
Popular vote	115,411	97,051
Percentage	54.32%	45.68%
U.S. Representative before election
Ron Klein
Democratic
Elected U.S. Representative
Allen West
Republican

Democratic incumbent Ron Klein was seeking re-election in this Palm Beach-Broward County district, and was challenged and defeated by Republican nominee Allen West, the former military officer whom Klein defeated 55–45 in 2008.

Klein defeated Paul Renneisen (campaign site, PVS) in the Democratic primary. West defeated David Brady (campaign site, PVS) in the Republican primary.

- Race ranking and details from CQ Politics
- Campaign Contributions from OpenSecrets
- Race profile at The New York Times

=== Polling ===
Poll Source	Dates Administered	Ron Klein (D)	Allen West (R)
Voter Survey Service	October 17–19, 2010	44%	47%
Harstad Strategic Research†	September 20–22, 2010	48%	43%
Wilson Research Strategies†	September 20–22, 2010	42%	48%
Anzalone Research†	September 14–16, 2010	48%	40%
Wilson Research Strategies†	April 18–19, 2010	42%	44%

†Internal poll (Wilson Research Strategies for West and Anzalone Research and Harstad Strategic Research for Klein)

==== Predictions ====
Source	Ranking	As of
The Cook Political Report	Tossup	November 1, 2010
Rothenberg	Tossup	November 1, 2010
Sabato's Crystal Ball	Lean R (flip)	November 1, 2010
RCP	Lean R (flip)	November 1, 2010
CQ Politics	Lean D	October 28, 2010
New York Times	Tossup	November 1, 2010
FiveThirtyEight	Lean R (flip)	November 1, 2010

=== Results ===
2010 22nd Congressional District of Florida Elections
Party	Candidate	Votes	%
Republican	Allen West	115,411	54.3
Democratic	Ron Klein (incumbent)	97,051	45.7
Republican gain from Democratic			

== District 23 ==
2010 Florida's 23rd congressional district election
- November 2, 2010
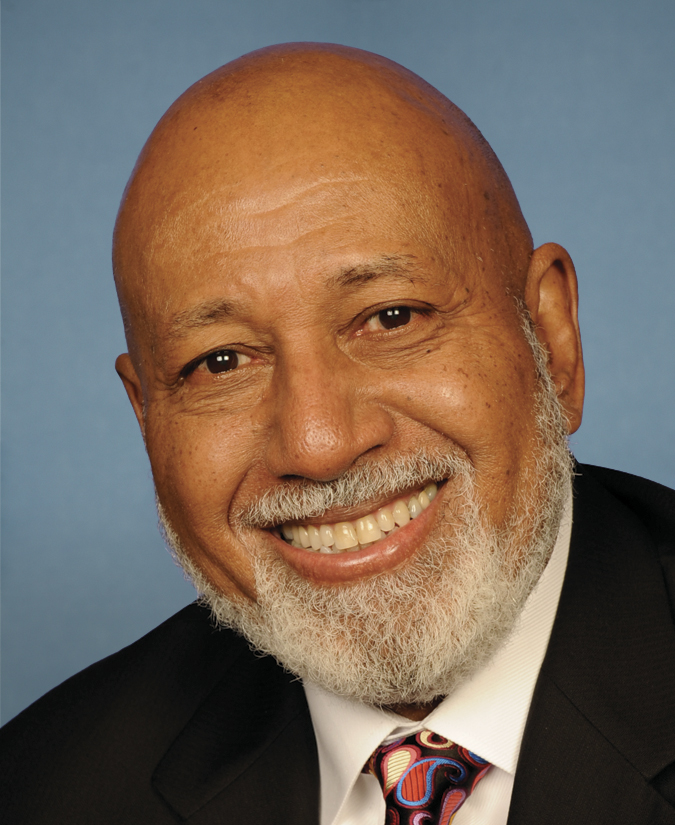

Nominee	Alcee Hastings	Bernard Sansaricq
Party	Democratic	Republican
Popular vote	100,006	26,414
Percentage	79.12%	20.88%
- County results Hastings: 70–80% 80–90% Sansaricq: 50–60%
U.S. Representative before election
Alcee Hastings
Democratic
Elected U.S. Representative
Alcee Hastings
Democratic

Democratic incumbent Alcee Hastings has held this seat since 1993 and ran for reelection. He was challenged by Republican nominee Bernard Sansaricq (campaign site, PVS). Both ran unopposed in their respective primary elections. Hastings was reelected by a wide margin.

- Race ranking and details from CQ Politics
- Campaign Contributions from OpenSecrets
- Race profile at The New York Times

=== Predictions ===
Source	Ranking	As of
The Cook Political Report	Safe D	November 1, 2010
Rothenberg	Safe D	November 1, 2010
Sabato's Crystal Ball	Safe D	November 1, 2010
RCP	Safe D	November 1, 2010
CQ Politics	Safe D	October 28, 2010
New York Times	Safe D	November 1, 2010
FiveThirtyEight	Safe D	November 1, 2010

=== Results ===
2010 23rd Congressional District of Florida Elections
Party	Candidate	Votes	%
Democratic	Alcee Hastings (incumbent)	100,066	79.1
Republican	Bernard Sansaricq	26,414	20.9
Democratic hold			

== District 24 ==
2010 Florida's 24th congressional district election
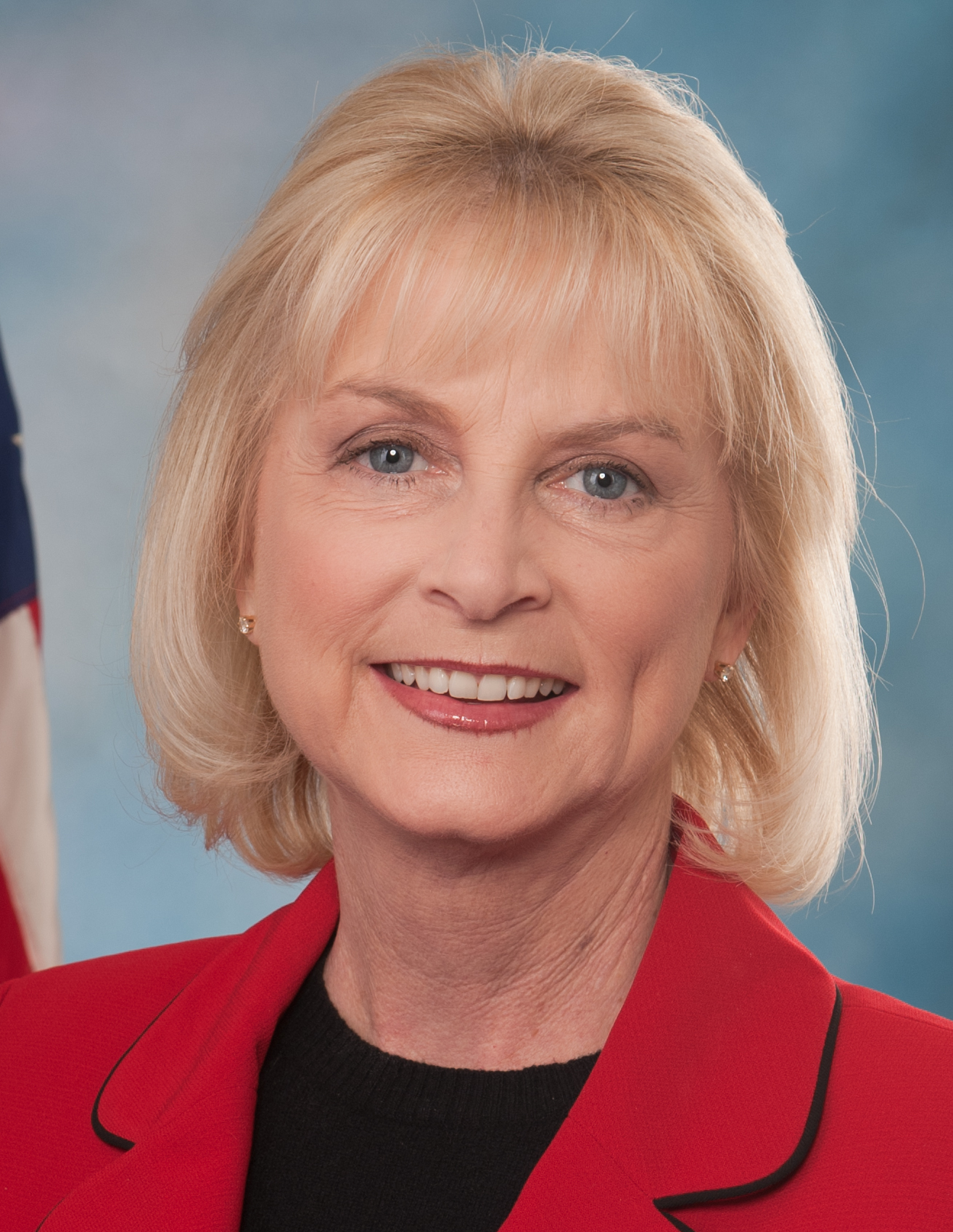

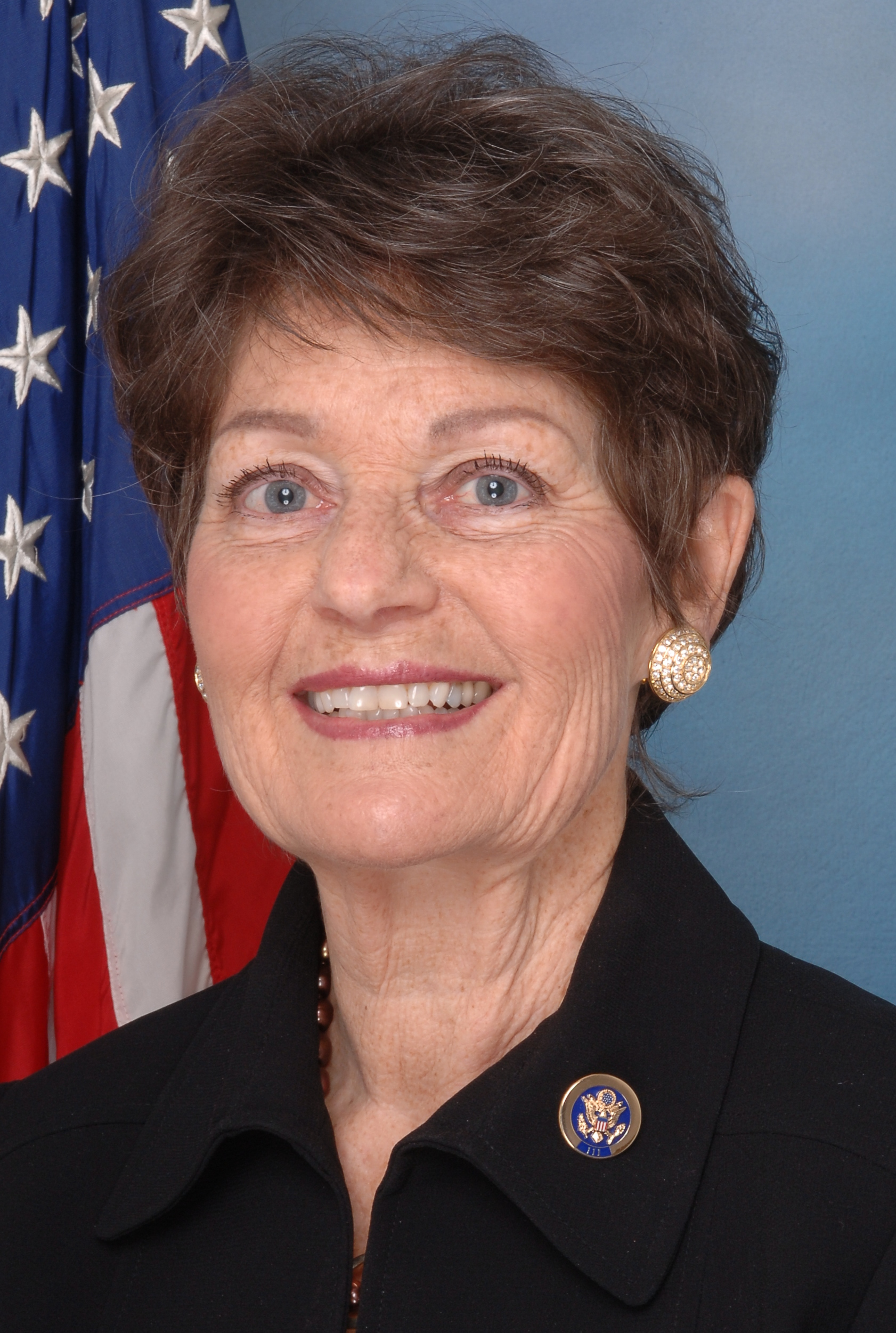
Nominee	Sandy Adams	Suzanne Kosmas
Party	Republican	Democratic
Popular vote	146,129	98,787
Percentage	59.6%	40.3%
- County results Adams: 50–60% 60–70%
U.S. Representative before election
Suzanne Kosmas
Democratic
Elected U.S. Representative
Sandy Adams
Republican

Democratic incumbent Suzanne Kosmas was challenged and defeated by Republican nominee Sandy Adams. Green Party nominee Nicholas Ruiz III, PhD., qualified as a write-in candidate.

Kosmas defeated former Winter Springs Mayor Paul Partyka in the Democratic primary. Adams defeated Karen Diebel, Tom Garcia, Deon Long and Craig Miller in the Republican primary.

=== Polling ===
Poll Source	Dates Administered	Suzanne Kosmas (D)	Sandra Adams (R)
Mclaughlin & Associates	September 22–23, 2010	39%	49%
Hamilton Campaigns†	September 22–23, 2010	45%	43%
Public Opinion Strategies	August 31-September 1, 2010	37%	49%
Hamilton Campaigns†	August, 2010	43%	49%

†Internal poll for Kosmas campaign

==== Predictions ====
Source	Ranking	As of
The Cook Political Report	Lean R (flip)	November 1, 2010
Rothenberg	Likely R (flip)	November 1, 2010
Sabato's Crystal Ball	Lean R (flip)	November 1, 2010
RCP	Lean R (flip)	November 1, 2010
CQ Politics	Likely R (flip)	October 28, 2010
New York Times	Lean R (flip)	November 1, 2010
FiveThirtyEight	Likely R (flip)	November 1, 2010

=== Results ===
2010 24th Congressional District of Florida Elections
Party	Candidate	Votes	%
Republican	Sandy Adams	146,129	59.6
Democratic	Suzanne Kosmas (incumbent)	98,787	40.3
Republican gain from Democratic			

== District 25 ==
2010 Florida's 25th congressional district election
- November 2, 2010
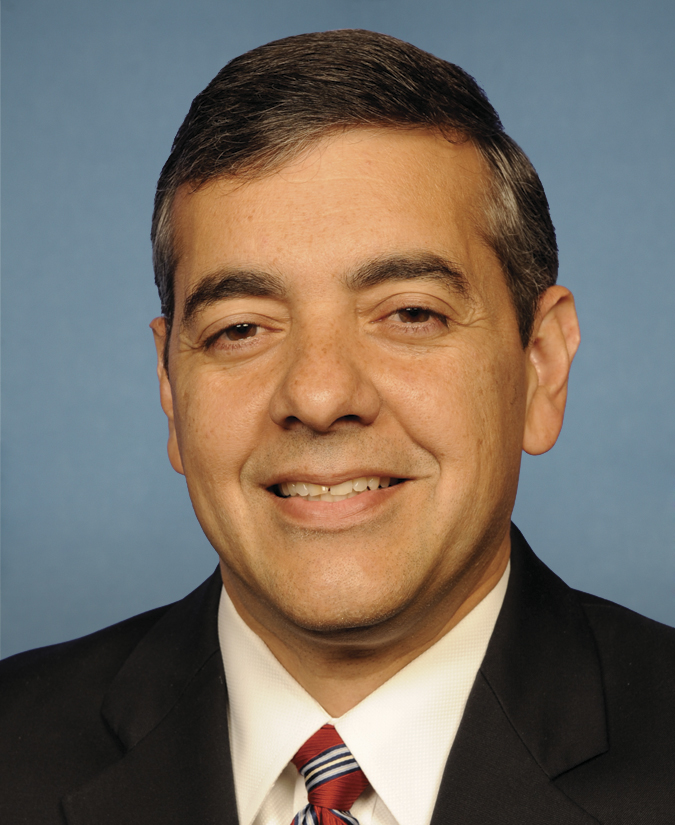

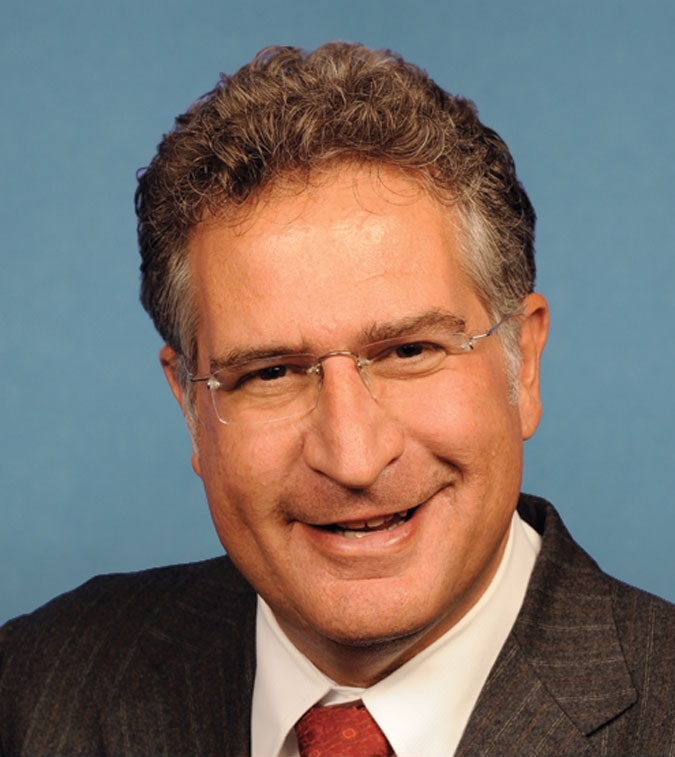
Nominee	David Rivera	Joe Garcia
Party	Republican	Democratic
Popular vote	74,859	61,138
Percentage	52.15%	42.59%
- County results Rivera: 50–60%
U.S. Representative before election
Mario Diaz-Balart
Republican
Elected U.S. Representative
David Rivera
Republican

Republican incumbent Mario Diaz-Balart held this district since 2003 but on February 11, 2010, announced that he would not seek another term in the 25th district but would instead run for his brother's seat in the 21st District of Florida. Republican nominee State Representative David Rivera, Democratic nominee Joe Garcia, Tea Party nominee Roly Arrojo (PVS), and Florida Whig Party nominee Craig Porter (campaign site, PVS) were running. Rivera prevailed in the general election.

Rivera defeated Mariana 'Marili' Cancio (campaign site, PVS) and Paul Crespo (campaign site, PVS) in the Republican primary. Garcia defeated Luis Meurice (campaign site, PVS) in the Democratic primary. Arrojo and Porter were unopposed in their respective primaries.

- Race ranking and details from CQ Politics
- Campaign Contributions from OpenSecrets
- Race profile at The New York Times

=== Polling ===
Poll Source	Dates Administered	David Rivera (R)	Joe Garcia (D)
Voter Survey Service	October 29, 2010	44%	40%
Voter Survey Service	October 25–26, 2010	44%	43%
Greenberg Quinlan Rosner†	September 12–19, 2010	33%	40%
Benenson Strategy Group†	March 24–27, 2010	35%	38%

†Internal poll for Garcia campaign

==== Predictions ====
Source	Ranking	As of
The Cook Political Report	Lean R	November 1, 2010
Rothenberg	Lean R	November 1, 2010
Sabato's Crystal Ball	Likely R	November 1, 2010
RCP	Lean R	November 1, 2010
CQ Politics	Lean R	October 28, 2010
New York Times	Tossup	November 1, 2010
FiveThirtyEight	Likely R	November 1, 2010

=== Results ===
2010 25th Congressional District of Florida Elections
Party	Candidate	Votes	%
Republican	David Rivera	74,859	52.1
Democratic	Joe Garcia	61,138	42.6
Tea Party Movement	Roly Arrojo	4,312	3.0
Whig	Craig Porters	3,244	2.3
Republican hold			
