= Rick Stark =

American politician

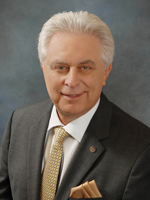

Member of the Florida House of Representatives from the 104th district
- In office November 6, 2012 – November 3, 2020
- Preceded by: John Patrick Julien (redistricted)
- Succeeded by: Robin Bartleman

Personal details
- Born: July 26, 1952 (age 74) New York City, New York
- Party: Democratic
- Spouse: Debbi Stark
- Children: Jason, Lindsey
- Education: University of Denver (B.A.)
- Profession: Insurance broker

Richard Stark (born July 26, 1952) is an American Democratic politician from Florida. He served four terms in the Florida House of Representatives, representing the 104th District in southern Broward County, from 2012 to 2020.

== History ==
Stark was born in New York City, New York, and attended the University of Denver, where he graduated with a degree in political science in 1974. After that, he moved to the state of Florida, where he worked as a private insurance agent, and for twelve years, lobbied the state and federal government to pass health care reform. Stark is married to Debbi Stark, a professional stenographer. He plays pickle ball and tennis in his free time.

== Florida House of Representatives ==
In 2012, following the reconfiguration of Florida House districts, Stark opted to run in the newly created 104th District, based in Broward County, including the cities of Pembroke Pines, Weston, Southwest Ranches and the Everglades Wildlife Management Area. In the Democratic primary, he faced Robin Behrman and Alanna Mersinger, and he campaigned on education reform, noting, "Of the people that are running in this race, I've spent almost the entire time as a private businessman but I do have an education background. I know what it's like to be on the education side. Education is really important to me."

Stark narrowly defeated both of his opponents, receiving 39% of the vote to Berhman's 32% and Mersinger's 29%. Advancing to the general election, Stark faced Douglas Harrison, a former prosecutor and the Republican nominee. Though Stark was praised by the South Florida Sun-Sentinel for his plan to "bolster public education, particularly the state's universities and their ability to offer scientific and technical programs to help the state's workforce," the paper endorsed Harrison, citing Stark's likelihood to be a "reliable Democratic vote." In the end, Stark defeated Harrison in a landslide, winning 61% of the vote, and was sworn in later that year.

Stark was re-elected to his second term in the legislature in 2014 without opposition. He was subsequently re-elected in 2016 and 2018 before being termed out.

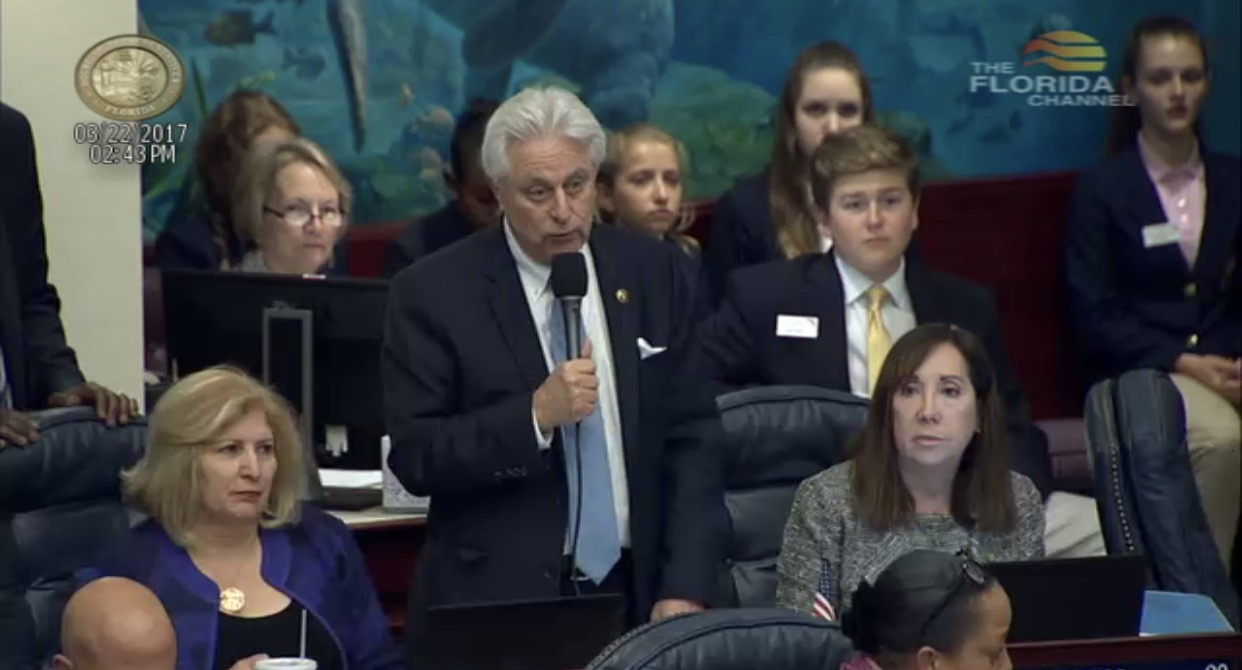
Stark debating on the House floor, appearing on the Florida Channel in 2017

In the legislature, he successfully sponsored a bill that made texting while driving a primary offense in Florida. He also was a co-sponsor of the Equal Rights Amendment, which died in the majority-Republican legislature.

He also served as deputy Democratic leader from 2018 to 2020 and as chair of the legislative Jewish caucus, in which capacity he passed a bill banning the state of Florida from doing business with any firms that boycott Israel. He also won appropriations to provide funds to augment security at Jewish community centers. He also condemned anti-Semitic rhetoric coming out of Florida State University.

Stark endorsed Broward County School Board Member, Robin Bartleman, to succeed him in the Florida House. Bartleman won the Democratic Nomination against political newcomer Morey Wright and then the general election in November 2020 against George Navarini. House District 104 remains a Florida Democratic Party stronghold.

He also supported President Joe Biden's 2020 run for president against then-incumbent Donald Trump. Mr. Biden won the Florida presidential preference primary but lost the state in the general election.

== Weston mayoral run ==
Stark was term-limited from the Florida House in 2020, after serving four terms. Stark attempted to run for Mayor of Weston, but lost in the general election to City Commissioner Margaret "Peggy" Brown, a well known Trump supporter and local GOP member, even though Joe Biden won every polling place in Weston that election cycle. Stark along with other local Democrat candidates lost big in the city elections, losing the mayoral race as well as two city commission seats. Stark in his mayoral run was endorsed by Congresswoman Debbie Wasserman Schultz, incumbent Weston City Commissioners Byron Jaffe (D), Tom Kallman (D), and Mary Molina-Macfie (D), and local Democratic activist Charles Horowitz. Since the loss in the 2020 elections, the city commission has been composed of three Republicans and two Democrats, compared to 2018 with four Democrats and one Republican.

== Recent activities ==
Stark has been the chair of the Broward County Jewish Democratic caucus since he founded it in 2021. He has been involved in many races in this capacity, including endorsing Jared Moskowitz (D-Parkland) in his successful bid to succeed retiring U.S. Rep. Ted Deutch (D). He also held a virtual town hall with several Democratic candidates running to succeed the deceased Alcee Hastings (D-Delray Beach) in 2021.
