= John Patrick Julien =

American politician (1963–2013)

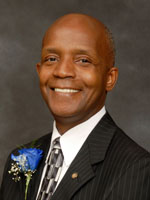

Member of the Florida House of Representatives from the 104th district
- In office November 2, 2010 – November 6, 2012
- Preceded by: Yolly Roberson
- Succeeded by: Rick Stark (redistricted)

Personal details
- Born: July 22, 1963 Port-au-Prince, Haiti
- Died: September 27, 2013 (aged 50) Hollywood, Florida
- Party: Democratic
- Children: 5
- Education: State University of New York College at Old Westbury (B.A.)
- Occupation: Process server

John Patrick Julien (July 22, 1963 – September 27, 2013) was a Democratic politician from Florida who served as a member of the Florida House of Representatives from the 104th district from 2010 to 2012.

== Early life ==
Julien was born in Port-au-Prince, Haiti, and immigrated to the United States as a child, growing up in New York City. He attended the State University of New York College at Old Westbury, graduating with his bachelor's degree in accounting in 1985. Julien moved to Florida in 1986, originally living in south Miami-Dade County, but moved to Kendall and then North Miami Beach after his property was destroyed by Hurricane Andrew.

== North Miami Beach City Council ==
In 2003, Julien ran for the North Miami Beach City Council to succeed retiring Councilman John Kurzman. He faced former El Portal Mayor Philippe Derose and Bruce Lamberto, a community activist, and ultimately lost to Derose, who became the first Haitian American elected to the city council.

Julien ran again in 2005, and faced allegations that he was falsely representing his credentials in his campaign. He claimed to be a "certified public accountant" who graduated from New York University with a master's degree in business administration, but no record of him existed at NYU or at the New York State Department of Education's Office of Professions. Julien won the election, He was later charged with two counts of misrepresentation, and under a plea agreement, made a charitable donation, completed an ethics training course, and publicly apologized. He was re-elected in 2007 and 2009.

== Florida House of Representatives ==
In 2010, State Representative Yolly Roberson was term-limited, and Julien ran to succeed her in the 104th district. He ran in a crowded Democratic primary, and won the endorsement of the Miami Herald, which praised him for his experience on the city council and "skills as an accountant." Julien won the primary, receiving 40 percent of the vote.

Following redistricting, Julien ran for re-election in 2012 in the 107th district, where he faced fellow State Representative Barbara Watson in the primary. The race between the two was close, with Watson initially leading Julien by 26 votes. Julien requested a recount, which reduced Watson's victory to just 13 votes. He then filed a lawsuit challenging the legitimacy of the election, alleging that some absentee ballots were fraudulently cast from a nursing home. Julien's lawsuit was dismissed, and though he considered contesting Watson's victory before the State House, he ultimately declined to do so, and stated that he was considering leaving the Democratic Party.

== Death ==
Julien died on September 27, 2013.
