= Barbara Watson =

Barbara Watson may refer to:

- Barbara M. Watson (1918–1983), United States diplomat
- Barbara Watson (politician) (born 1950), member of the Florida House of Representatives
- Barbara Watson, fictional character in the TV series Black Summer
