= Steve Southerland (Florida politician) =

American politician (born 1965)

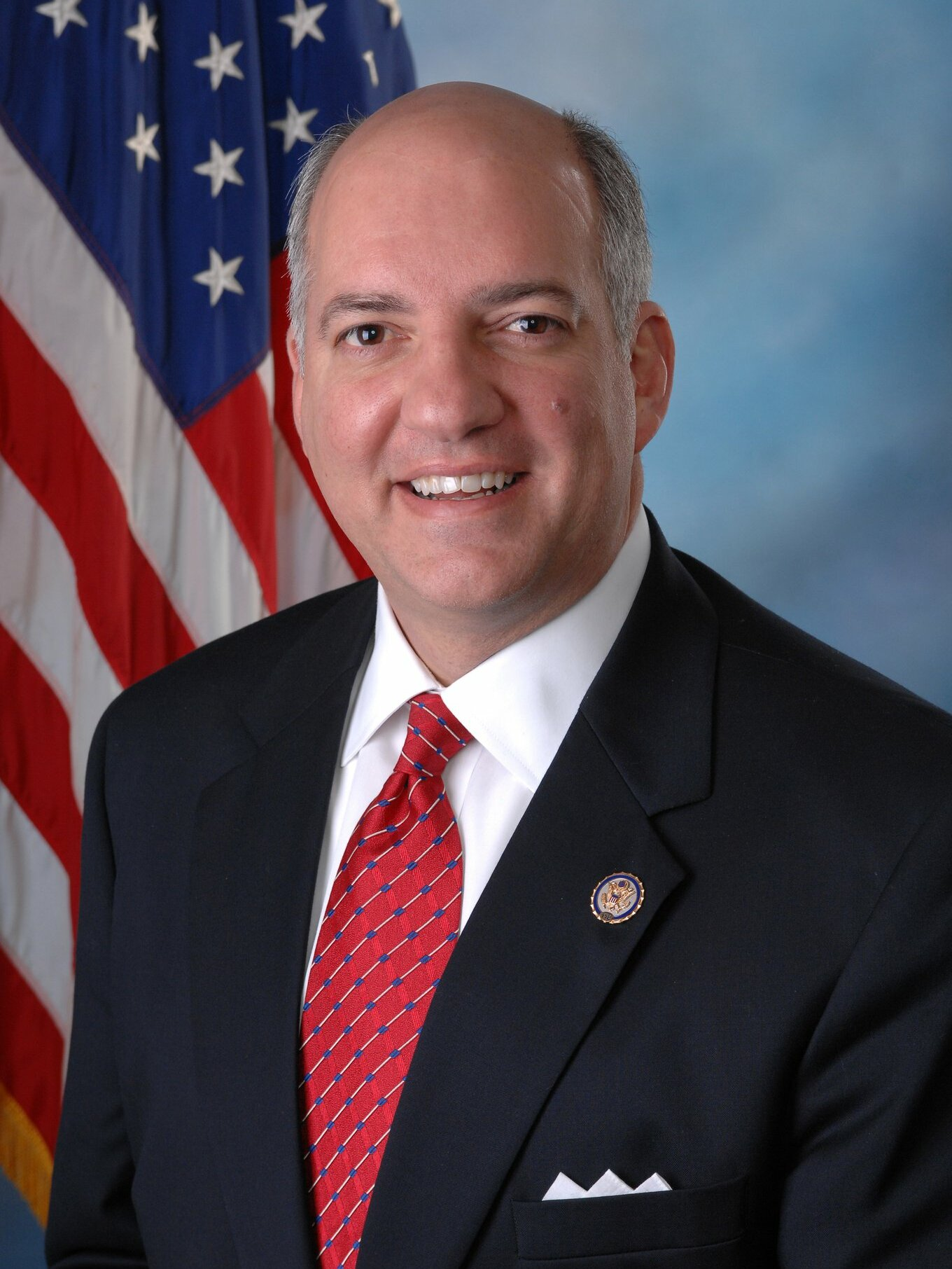
- Official portrait, 2011

Member of the U.S. House of Representatives from Florida's 2nd district
- In office January 3, 2011 – January 3, 2015
- Preceded by: Allen Boyd
- Succeeded by: Gwen Graham

Personal details
- Born: William Steve Southerland II; October 10, 1965 (age 60) Nashville, Tennessee, U.S.
- Party: Republican
- Spouse: Susan Southerland
- Children: 4
- Education: Jefferson State Community College (AA); Troy University (BS)
- Website: Official website

William Steve Southerland II (born October 10, 1965) is an American businessman, lobbyist and former Republican Party politician who served as the U.S. representative for Florida's 2nd congressional district from 2011 to 2015. The district includes most of the eastern Florida Panhandle, from Panama City to the state capital, Tallahassee. He was narrowly defeated for re-election in 2014 by Democrat Gwen Graham, becoming one of only two incumbent House Republicans to lose a general election that year, along with Lee Terry of Nebraska.

== Early life and education ==
Southerland was born on October 10, 1965, in Nashville, Tennessee. He is a lifelong resident of Panama City. He is the fourth generation of five in his family to live in Bay County. In 1983, he graduated from A. Crawford Mosley High School. He earned a B.S. degree in Business Management from Troy State University and an A.A. degree in Mortuary Science from Jefferson State Junior College.

== Business career ==
Southerland is co-owner/president of Southerland Family Funeral Homes, founded in 1955. He is also a founding partner in two other businesses: Genesis Granite & Stone, LLC and K & B Land and Timber Company, LLC. Florida's governor appointed him as chairman of the Early Learning Coalition of Northwest Florida and to the Florida Board of Funeral Directors, where he served as chairman in his second term.

== U.S. House of Representatives ==
=== Elections ===
==== 2010 ====
Southerland won the Republican primary against Eddie Hendry, Ron McNeil, Barbara F. Olschner and David Scholl. He was part of the GOP Young Gun Program. He was endorsed by U.S. Congressmen Eric Cantor, Jeff Miller, former State House Speaker Allan Bense, former Democratic Governor Wayne Mixson, State Rep. Jimmy Patronis, State Rep. Marti Coley, former U.S. Congressman Bill Grant, former Alaska Governor Sarah Palin and Lynn Haven Mayor Walter Kelley. It was Southerland's first bid for elected office.

Southerland faced seven-term Democratic incumbent Allen Boyd in the November general election. Independent candidates Paul C. McKain and Dianne Berryhill were also on the ballot, and Ray Netherwood had qualified as a write-in candidate.

Real Clear Politics rated this race a "Leans GOP". CQ Politics rated the election as a toss-up.

In the November 2 general election, Southerland defeated Boyd with 52 percent of the vote. Southerland is the first freshman Republican to represent the 2nd since its formation in 1963 (it was the 9th District from 1963–1967 and has been the 2nd since 1967). The only other Republican to ever represent this district, Bill Grant, was originally elected as a Democrat in 1986, but switched parties midway through his second term.

==== 2012 ====
Southerland defeated former State Senator Alfred Lawson Jr. 53% 175,856 votes to 47% 157,634 out of 333,718 ballots cast on November 6, 2012, for his re-election to a second term in Congress.

==== 2014 ====
Southerland ran for re-election. He ran unopposed for the Republican nomination in the primary, and faced Gwen Graham in the general election on November 4, 2014. Southerland lost the election, receiving 49.56% of the vote to Graham's 50.44%.

=== Tenure ===
Southerland opposes military intervention in Syria.

He voted for the Amash–Conyers Amendment, which would prohibit the collection of records by the National Security Agency under the Patriot Act.

He voted against the 2014 Farm Bill, a $1 trillion bill which expanded crop insurance for farmers by $7 billion over the next decade and created new subsidies for rice and peanut growers that would kick in when prices drop.

Southerland has said he wants to replace the Affordable Care Act "with an approach that incorporates free-market principles. The article cited states: "Southerland prefers a system that would give consumers greater access to health savings accounts and force greater competition on insurance providers while retaining the Obamacare provision that prohibits insurers from denying coverage for pre-existing conditions. He voiced support for tort reform to help prevent frivolous lawsuits against doctors." "

On July 11, 2014, Southerland introduced the Waters of the United States Regulatory Overreach Protection Act of 2014 (H.R. 5078; 113th Congress), a bill that would prohibit the Environmental Protection Agency (EPA) and the U.S. Army Corps of Engineers (Corps) from implementing or enforcing certain proposed regulations regarding the use of the nation's waters and wetlands.

The American Conservative Union gave him an 83% evaluation.

=== Committee assignments ===
- Committee on Natural Resources
  - Subcommittee on Fisheries, Wildlife, Oceans and Insular Affairs
- Committee on Transportation and Infrastructure
  - Subcommittee on Coast Guard and Maritime Transportation
  - Subcommittee on Highways and Transit

=== Caucus memberships ===
- Congressional Constitution Caucus

== Personal life ==
Steve and Susan Southerland have four children. He is a member of Emerald Coast Fellowship, a Baptist church in Panama City.

Southerland served as Chairman of the Bay County Chamber of Commerce and Chairman of the Salvation Army Advisory Board as well as such community boards including the Florida State University Panama City Development Board and the Covenant Hospice Foundation Board. He is a member of the National Rifle Association of America, and a founding member and the former Vice President of the Bay Patriots.

== Electoral history ==
=== 2010 ===
Florida's 2nd Congressional District Election (2010)
Party	Candidate	Votes	%
Republican	Steve Southerland	136,371	54%
Democratic	Allen Boyd*	105,211	41%
Independent	Paul Crandall McKain	7,135	3%
Independent	Dianne J. Berryhill	5,705	2%
No party	Others	16	0
Total votes		254,438	100%
Turnout			
Republican gain from Democratic			

=== 2012 ===
Florida's 2nd Congressional District Election (2012)
Party	Candidate	Votes	%
Republican	Steve Southerland*	175,856	53%
Democratic	Alfred Lawson, Jr.	157,634	47%
No party	Floyd Patrick Miller	228	0.01
Total votes		333,718	100%
Turnout			
Republican hold			

=== 2014 ===
Florida's 2nd Congressional District Election, (2014)
Party	Candidate	Votes	%
Democratic	Gwen Graham	126,096	50.5%
Republican	Steve Southerland*	123,262	49.3%
Write-in	Luther Lee	422	0.2%
Total votes		249,780	100%
Democratic gain from Republican			

U.S. House of Representatives
Preceded by Allen Boyd	Member of the U.S. House of Representatives from Florida's 2nd congressional district 2011–2015	Succeeded by Gwen Graham
U.S. order of precedence (ceremonial)
Preceded by Ron Klein as Former U.S. Representative	Order of precedence of the United States as Former U.S. Representative	Succeeded by Patrick Murphy as Former U.S. Representative
