= Yolly Roberson =

American politician

Member of the Florida House of Representatives from the 104 district
- In office November 20, 2002 – November 8, 2010
- Preceded by: Frederica Wilson
- Succeeded by: John Patrick Julien

Personal details
- Born: October 26, 1955 (age 70)
- Party: Democratic
- Children: 1
- Profession: Attorney

Yolly Roberson is a Miami, Florida attorney and Democratic politician who serves as the representative for District 104 of the Florida House of Representatives. She was first elected to the Florida House in 2002 and then reelected successively to three more terms. She served as Democratic Whip from 2004 to 2006.

Representative Roberson was born in Mirebalais, Haiti on October 26, 1955. She earned her Bachelor of Science in Nursing at the University of Massachusetts Boston in 1983 and her Juris Doctor at the New England School of Law in 1988. She has worked as a public defender in Boston and as a senior assistant attorney general in Fort Lauderdale, Florida.

== See also ==
- United States House of Representatives elections in Florida, 2010#District 17
