= Sharon Pritchett =

American politician

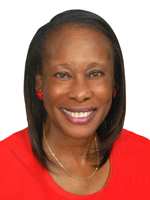

Member of the Florida House of Representatives from the 102nd district
- In office November 6, 2012 – November 3, 2020
- Preceded by: Redistricted
- Succeeded by: Felicia Robinson

Personal details
- Born: August 17, 1951 (age 75) Miami, Florida
- Party: Democratic
- Education: St. Thomas University (B.S.) (M.S.)
- Profession: Public investigator

Sharon Pritchett (born August 17, 1951) is a Democratic politician from Florida. She served four terms in the Florida House of Representatives, representing the 102nd District, stretching from Miami Gardens to Pembroke Pines in northern Miami-Dade County and southern Broward County, from 2012 to 2020.

== History ==
Pritchett was born in Miami and attended St. Thomas University, where she received her bachelor's degree in Criminal Justice in 1978 and then her master's degree in Administration of Justice in 1980. After graduation, she worked as a public investigator for the Miami-Dade County Public Defender's Office. She served on the Committee to Incorporate the City of Miami Gardens in 2002, and shortly after the city was successfully incorporated, was elected to the Miami Gardens City Council, where she served from 2003 to 2011.

When Oscar Braynon was elected to the State Senate to replace Frederica Wilson, who had been elected to the United States House of Representatives, a special election was held to replace him in the 103rd District, which included parts of southern Broward County and northern Miami-Dade County, stretching from Bunche Park to Miami Gardens. Pritchett ran to succeed him in the Democratic primary on February 8, 2011, and she faced former Miami Gardens Vice-Mayor Barbara Watson and Erhabor Ighodaro. A contentious campaign ensued, and on election night, it appeared as though Prichett had emerged victorious; the Sun-Sentinel declared her the narrow victor over Watson. However, Pritchett held only a 14-vote lead over Watson, and, following a state-mandated recount, Watson narrowly took the lead over Pritchett by 18 votes, winning the election.

== Florida House of Representatives ==
Following the reconfiguration of legislative districts in 2012, Pritchett ran in the newly created 102nd District, which contained much of the territory of the 103rd District. She was challenged in the Democratic primary by Melvin Bratton, whom she defeated by a comfortable margin of victory, winning with 58% of the vote. In the general election, she did not face an opponent and she was elected to her first term in the legislature uncontested.

While serving in the legislature, Pritchett joined with State Senator Rene Garcia, a Republican, to sponsor legislation that would provide "mandatory vision screenings for students entering the public school system for the first time," explaining, "So often we hear about children who are just not performing to their optimal capabilities, and they're not doing so because they can't see; they've never had an eye exam. We need this. It's something that guarantees each child who may need corrective lenses can be identified at an early enough age."

In 2014, Pritchett was re-elected to her second term in the legislature without opposition.

She was term-limited from the House in 2020, after serving four terms.
