= Waters of the United States Regulatory Overreach Protection Act of 2014 =

United States legislation

- Long title: To preserve existing rights and responsibilities with respect to waters of the United States, and for other purposes.
- Announced in: the 113th United States Congress
- Sponsored by: Rep. Steve Southerland II (R, FL-2)
- Number of co-sponsors: 13

Codification
- U.S.C. sections affected: 33 U.S.C. § 1344, 33 U.S.C. § 1251 et seq.
- Agencies affected: United States Environmental Protection Agency, Supreme Court of the United States, United States Department of the Army

Legislative history
- Introduced in the House as H.R. 5078 by Rep. Steve Southerland II (R, FL-2) on July 11, 2014; Committee consideration by United States House Committee on Transportation and Infrastructure, United States House Transportation Subcommittee on Water Resources and Environment; Passed the House on September 9, 2014 (Roll Call Vote 489: 262-152)

The Waters of the United States Regulatory Overreach Protection Act of 2014 (H.R. 5078) is a bill that would prohibit the Environmental Protection Agency (EPA) and the U.S. Army Corps of Engineers (Corps) from implementing or enforcing certain proposed regulations regarding the use of the nation’s waters and wetlands.

The bill was introduced into the United States House of Representatives during the 113th United States Congress.

== Provisions of the bill ==
This summary is based largely on the summary provided by the Congressional Research Service, a public domain source.

The Waters of the United States Regulatory Overreach Protection Act of 2014 would prohibit the U.S. Army Corps of Engineers and the Environmental Protection Agency (EPA) from:

- developing, finalizing, adopting, implementing, applying, administering, or enforcing the proposed rule entitled, "Definition of 'Waters of the United States' Under the Clean Water Act," issued on April 21, 2014, or the proposed guidance entitled, "Guidance on Identifying Waters Protected By the Clean Water Act," dated February 17, 2012; or
- using the proposed rule or proposed guidance, any successor document, or any substantially similar proposed rule or guidance as the basis for any rulemaking or decision regarding the scope or enforcement of the Federal Water Pollution Control Act (commonly known as the Clean Water Act).

The bill would require the Army Corps and the EPA to withdraw the interpretive rule entitled, "Notice of Availability Regarding the Exemption from Permitting Under Section 404(f)(1)(A) of the Clean Water Act to Certain Agricultural Conservation Practices," issued on April 21, 2014.

The bill would require the Army Corps and the EPA to consult with relevant state and local officials to develop recommendations for a regulatory proposal that would identify the scope of waters covered under the Clean Water Act and the scope of waters not covered.

== Congressional Budget Office report ==
This summary is based largely on the summary provided by the Congressional Budget Office, as ordered reported by the House Committee on Transportation and Infrastructure on July 16, 2014. This is a public domain source.

H.R. 5078 would prohibit the Environmental Protection Agency (EPA) and the U.S. Army Corps of Engineers (Corps) from implementing or enforcing certain proposed regulations regarding the use of the nation’s waters and wetlands. The legislation would affect direct spending because it would reduce fees collected by the Corps for issuing permits under the Clean Water Act (CWA). However, the Congressional Budget Office (CBO) estimates that the change in those fees would be negligible. Because the legislation would affect direct spending, pay-as-you-go procedures apply. Enacting H.R. 5078 would not affect revenues. In addition, CBO estimates that implementing H.R. 5078 would have no significant effect on discretionary spending by EPA or the Corps.

Under the CWA, EPA and the Corps, along with the states, serve as co-regulators of the nation’s waters. H.R. 5078 would prohibit the agencies from developing, finalizing, adopting, implementing, or enforcing the following:

- A proposed rule published in the Federal Register on April 21, 2014, that defines the scope of waters protected by the CWA;
- Draft Guidance Regarding Identification of Waters Protected by the Clean Water Act, submitted to the Office of Management and Budget on February 21, 2012, that clarifies how EPA and the Corps should identify U.S. waters protected by the CWA and implement two Supreme Court decisions on this issue; and
- An interpretive rule published in the Federal Register on April 21, 2014, to clarify the types of discharges of dredged or fill material associated with certain agricultural conservation practices that can be exempted from section 404 permits.

Finally, enacting this legislation would require EPA and the Corps to jointly consult with state regulatory officials to develop recommendations for an alternative regulatory proposal instead of the proposed rules and draft guidance; such recommendations would be provided to the Congress in a final report.

The regulatory changes proposed under current law would expand the area covered by federal regulations and the number of permits issued by the Corps under the CWA. The legislation would probably prevent, reduce, or delay such an expansion of federally regulated waters. However, because the amount of permit fees collected by the Corps is nominal, CBO estimates enacting H.R. 5078 would have an insignificant effect on direct spending over the 2015-2024 period.

As with similar legislative proposals directing EPA to prepare alternatives to proposed rules, CBO estimates that enacting this legislation would have no significant net impact on federal spending. Under the bill, we expect that EPA resources that would have been used to develop and implement the currently proposed rules and draft guidance would be used to develop an alternative regulatory proposal and a report to the Congress.

H.R. 5078 contains no intergovernmental or private-sector mandates as defined in the Unfunded Mandates Reform Act, and any costs incurred by state, local, or tribal governments would result from participation in a voluntary federal program.

== Procedural history ==
The Waters of the United States Regulatory Overreach Protection Act of 2014 was introduced into the United States House of Representatives on July 11, 2014 by Rep. Steve Southerland II (R, FL-2). It was referred to the United States House Committee on Transportation and Infrastructure and the United States House Transportation Subcommittee on Water Resources and Environment. It was reported on July 31, 2014 alongside House Report 113-568. On September 9, 2014, the House voted to pass the bill in Roll Call Vote 489 by a vote of 262-152.

== Debate and discussion ==
The Water Advocacy Coalition (WAC), which calls itself an "inter-industry coalition representing the construction, real estate, mining, agriculture, forestry, manufacturing, energy sectors, and wildlife conservation interests," supported the bill and urged Representatives to vote for it. According to WAC, H.R. 5078 would improve the existing situation - a dispute over who owned and controlled some waters - by "requiring the agencies to conduct a transparent, representative, and open consultation with state and local officials to develop a consensus about those waters that should be under federal jurisdiction."

The National Rural Electric Cooperative Association (NRECA) supported the bill, arguing that under the proposed rule, "electric cooperatives will face significant challenges as we strive to provide our member-owners with reliable and affordable energy." The NRECA also argued that the proposed rule could result in the need for groups to gain many federal permits "causing uncertainty, delay, and cost."

== See also ==
- Waters of the United States
- List of bills in the 113th United States Congress
