= Florida's 107th House of Representatives district =

Florida district

Florida's 107th State House of Representatives district
Representative
| Wallace Aristide; D–Miami Gardens |

Florida's 107th House of Representatives district elects one member of the Florida House of Representatives. It contains parts of Miami-Dade County.

== Members ==
- Barbara Watson (2012–2020)
- Christopher Benjamin (2020–2024)
- Wallace Aristide (since 2024)
