= Christopher Benjamin (politician) =

American attorney, mediator, arbitrator, magistrate and politician

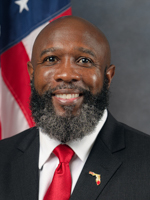

Miami-Dade County Court Judge
- Incumbent
- Assumed office November 5, 2024

Member of the Florida House of Representatives from the 107th district
- In office November 3, 2020 – November 5, 2024
- Preceded by: Barbara Watson
- Succeeded by: Wallace Aristide

Personal details
- Born: Hollywood, Florida, U.S.
- Party: No Party Affiliation
- Spouse: Zakiyyah Shakir-Benjamin Carleen Nelson-Benjamin (deceased)
- Children: 4
- Education: Florida Memorial University (BS); St. Thomas University (JD)

Military service
- Branch/service: United States Army
- Years of service: 1991–1994

Christopher Benjamin is an American judge who also has served as a member of the Florida House of Representatives for District 107 from November 2020 until November 2024. He was elected in November 2024 to serve as a County Court Judge for Miami-Dade County’s Eleventh Judicial Circuit.

== Early life and education ==
Benjamin was born and raised in Hollywood, Florida. He earned a Bachelor of Science degree in political science from Florida Memorial University in 1998 and a Juris Doctor from the St. Thomas University School of Law in 2001.

== Career ==
As a young teenager, Benjamin began his working experience as a door-to-door salesman for the Miami Herald. Benjamin served in the United States Army from 1991 to 1994. After graduating from law school, Benjamin worked as an attorney in the Case Management Division (Family Division) of the 11th Judicial Circuit of Miami-Dade County, Florida. In 2002, Benjamin opened his law practice, formerly known as the Barrister Firm where he has provided affordable legal services to clients in the areas of Business Formation, Business Litigation, Bankruptcy, Civil Litigation, Child Support, Criminal Defense, Commercial Litigation, Consumer Litigation, Estate Planning, Family Law, Guardianship, Probate, Real Estate and Real Estate Closings w/Title Insurance (Residential and Commercial). In 2021, he joined the law firm, International Law Partners as Of Counsel.

In 2007, Benjamin obtained his first certifications in Alternative Dispute Resolution (Mediation and Arbitration) and has actively practiced with the prestigious ADR firm of Salmon and Dulberg and he has also been an independent contractor with the 17th Judicial Circuit of Broward County, Florida (Mediation Department) and the FL Department of Financial Services (Mediation Program - Insurance Disputes). In 2010, Benjamin was appointed as a Traffic Hearing Officer with the 11th Judicial Circuit Court of Miami-Dade County, Florida; he has also been appointed Special Magistrate for municipalities throughout S. Florida as well as an arbitrator and mediator for the Financial Industry Regulatory Agency (FINRA).

In his community, Benjamin has served on several committees and boards such as: Florida's Local Advocacy Council, Miami Garden's Nuisance Abatement Board, Miami-Dade County's Citizen's Independent Transportation Trust, Parks and Recreation, Small Business/Minority Certification and the Human Rights Commission, Dade Public School' s Small Business/Minority Certifications, Attendance & Boundary Committee and the Save Our Future Advisory Committee.

Benjamin is also a Florida licensed real estate broker, title insurance agent, title insurance instructor and notary. He has taught at Florida Memorial University, Miami Dade College and Nova Southeastern University Shepard Broad School of Law.

In 2020, Benjamin defeated Ulysses Harvard in the Democratic primary for District 107 in the Florida House of Representatives. Benjamin did not face a candidate in the general election and assumed office on November 3, 2020.

In 2022, Benjamin defeated Wancito Francis in the Democratic primary for District 107 in the Florida House of Representatives. Benjamin did not face a candidate in the general election and was reelected to office on November 2, 2022.

In 2024, Benjamin would finish first in a three-way race for County Court Judge against Hon. Scott Janowitz and Alina Salcines Restrepo, Esq. Benjamin would go on to defeat Restrepo in a runoff and was elected to office on November 5, 2024.

== Historic Achievements ==
Upon assuming office, Benjamin became the first Muslim elected to the Florida legislature. Upon taking the Bench, Benjamin became the first Muslim initially elected [in a contested race] to the judiciary in the state of Florida (third Muslim overall to be seated as a Judge in FL) and the first to serve Miami-Dade County, FL.

Judge Benjamin is listed in the Congressional Records for his 20+ years of service to the community and the historic elections won that affirmed that service.

== Elections ==
2020 Florida's 107th House district Primary Election
Party	Candidate	Votes	%
Democratic	Christopher Benjamin	13,376	60.6
Democratic	Ulysses Buck Harvard	8,700	39.4
Total votes		22,076	100%
