= Felicia Robinson =

American politician and educator

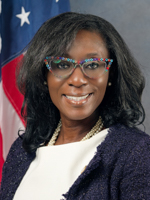

Member of the Florida House of Representatives
- Incumbent
- Assumed office November 3, 2020
- Preceded by: Sharon Pritchett
- Constituency: 102nd district (2020–2022); 104th district (2022–present)

Personal details
- Born: November 4, 1970 (age 55) Miami Gardens, Florida, U.S.
- Party: Democratic
- Education: Tuskegee University (BS); University of Miami (MS); Barry University (EdS)

Felicia Simone Robinson (born November 4, 1970) is an American politician and educator serving as a member of the Florida House of Representatives from the 104th district. She assumed office on November 3, 2020.

== Early life and education ==
Robinson was born in Miami Gardens, Florida and graduated from North Miami Beach Senior High School in 1988. She earned a Bachelor of Science degree in mathematics from Tuskegee University, a Master of Science in math education from the University of Miami, and an EdS in educational leadership from Barry University.

== Career ==
Robinson has worked for the Miami-Dade County Public Schools for over 25 years, including as a math teacher, instructional coach, and vice principal. She served as a member of the Miami Gardens City Council from 2010 to 2018 and as vice mayor from 2014 to 2018. Robinson was elected to the Florida House of Representatives and assumed office on November 3, 2020.
