= Wallace Aristide =

American politician

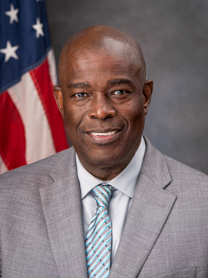

Member of the Florida House of Representatives from the 107th district
- Incumbent
- Assumed office November 5, 2024
- Preceded by: Christopher Benjamin

Personal details
- Born: Nassau, Bahamas (Note: Note that Aristide's official legislative page states he was born in Nassau, Bahamas, however local media has reported that he was born in Haiti.)
- Party: Democratic
- Spouse: Linda Cothiere-Aristide
- Children: 2
- Education: Bethune-Cookman University (BS); Nova Southeastern University (MS)

Wallace Aristide is an American educator and politician serving as a Democratic member for the 107th district of the Florida House of Representatives since 2024.

== Early life and career ==
Aristide was born in Nassau, Bahamas, and moved to Florida in 1969. He is of Haitian descent and is a graduate of Catholic schools in Miami. Aristide earned a Bachelor of Science in criminal justice from Bethune-Cookman University in 1988 then a Master of Science degree in education Nova Southeastern University in 2000. He began working as assistant principal from 2006 and principal from 2011 of Miami Northwestern High School.

== Political career ==
Aristide ran for the Miami-Dade County Commission in 2022, placing fourth among six candidates with 18.4% of the vote. He received large donations from a political committee linked to Genting Group, which planned to build Resorts World Miami.

In 2024, Aristide ran for the Florida House of Representatives. He sponsored "The Teddy Bridgewater Act" which was passed in March 2026 and allows high school football coaches to spend on their players for items such as meals and rides after Bridgewater was suspended from his role as Miami Northwestern High School's head coach for making purchases for students.

He is unopposed in the primary and general elections in 2026.

== Personal life ==
Aristide resides in Miami. He is married to Linda Cothiere-Aristide and two sons, Ishmael— a football coach with the Texas Aggies— and Ricardo.
