= Barbara Watson (politician) =

American politician (born 1950)

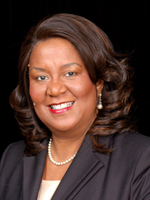

Member of the Florida House of Representatives
- In office March 8, 2011 – November 3, 2020
- Preceded by: Oscar Braynon
- Succeeded by: Christopher Benjamin
- Constituency: 103rd district (2011–2012); 107th district (2012–2020)

Vice Mayor of Miami Gardens
- In office 2007–2009

Memer of the Miami Gardens City Council
- In office 2003–2010

Personal details
- Born: July 4, 1950 (age 76) Miami, Florida
- Party: Democratic

Barbara Watson (born July 4, 1950) is a Democratic politician from Florida. She served in the Florida House of Representatives, representing parts of North Miami to Miami Gardens in northern Miami-Dade County, from 2011 to 2020.

== History ==
Watson was born in Miami and became active in community affairs, serving as the Director of the Andover Civic Association starting in 1992. She owned and operated Watson Antique and Classic Cars with her husband, and later served as a director on the Florida Limousine Association of South Florida and served on the Dade County Limousine Advisory Board. Following its incorporation in 2003, Watson served on the Miami Gardens City Council from 2003 to 2010 and was the vice-mayor from 2007 to 2009.

== Florida House of Representatives ==
When State Representative Oscar Braynon was elected to the Florida Senate to replace newly elected Congresswoman Frederica Wilson, a special election was held to fill the vacancy in the 103rd District, which included parts of southern Broward County and northern Miami-Dade County, stretching from Bunche Park to Miami Gardens. Watson ran in the Democratic primary on February 8, 2011, and faced former Miami Gardens City Councilwoman Sharon Pritchett and Erhabor Ighodaro. The race remained close up until election day, when Pritchett narrowly claimed victory over Watson; the Sun-Sentinel called the election for Pritchett. However, following a state-mandated recount, Watson went from a 14-vote deficit to an 18-vote lead over Prichett, enabling her to clinch the nomination of her party and to move on to the general election, where she was elected unopposed.

In 2012, following the reconfiguration of the legislative districts, Watson was moved into the 107th District, which, like her previous district, was based in Miami Gardens, but switched the reach to Pembroke Pines for an extension to North Miami. She faced fellow State Representative John Patrick Julien in the Democratic primary, and, once again, faced another contentious election. Watson emerged narrowly victorious over Julien, claiming a 26-vote lead over him. Following a recount, that was cut in half to a 13-vote lead and Watson was certified as the winner. However, Julien alleged that there was absentee ballot fraud and filed a lawsuit to block Watson's victory. In spite of her opponent's claim, Watson continued her campaign, though she only faced a write-in opponent in the general election. In October, a state judge ruled that her victory was legitimate, "despite some suspicious signatures on several absentee ballots cast," and she remained on the ballot, winning the election unopposed.

Watson was term-limited from the House in 2020, after serving a partial term and four full terms.

She attempted to be run for the Florida Senate in 2020, however was defeated in the primary.
