= Florida Whig Party =

- Chairperson: Paul Grant Truesdell
- Secretary: Kellean Truesdell (Secretary)
- Founded: 2006
- Dissolved: 2012
- Headquarters: 200 N.W. 52nd Street, Ocala, FL 34482
- Ideology: Syncretic politics Transpartisanship; Fiscal conservatism Constitutional limits on federal powers
- Political position: Center-right
- Colors: Blue and Red

Website
- www.FloridaWhig.com

The Florida Whig Party was a political party in the state of Florida. The party chose to revive the 19th century Whig Party name. In 2008, the party aligned itself with the Modern Whig Party, a national organization of about 30,000 members initially founded by Iraq and Afghanistan veterans as a "comeback" of the historic Whig Party. However, the Florida Whig Party discontinued this association in late 2009, largely due to its increasingly conservative platform. The Florida Whig Party was the first "Whig" state political party to officially run candidates for federal office in over a century.

== Activity ==
In late 2009 and early 2010, the Florida Whig Party attracted attention for fielding an unusually large number of candidates for a third party. However, their first candidate, Paul McKain, left the party in early 2010 to run without affiliation. In addition, the party attempted to field additional Whig candidates, to include Clayton Schock, John Annarumma, Stephen Bacon, and Steve Gerritzen, but in spring 2010 the party announced that they failed to qualify for the ballot. Some of these candidates reportedly attempted to run as either write-in candidates or no party affiliation.

Businessman Craig Porter, however, did qualify for the ballot as a Florida Whig. He received 2.2% of the vote, a total of 3,186 votes.

After the election of November 4, 2008, the Modern Whig Party and the Florida Whig Party began a push to attract moderate/conservative Democrats and Republicans.

According to the party website, the party was dissolved in 2012.
