= Florida's 104th House of Representatives district =

Florida district

Florida's 104th State House of Representatives district
Representative
Felicia Robinson; D–Miami Gardens

Florida's 104th House of Representatives district elects one member of the Florida House of Representatives. It contains parts of Broward County and Miami-Dade County.

== Members ==
- Felicia Robinson (since 2022)
