= Barbara Olschner =

American lawyer

Barbara F. Olschner
- Born: Barbara Friers Olschner; March 29, 1951 (age 75); Nashville, Tennessee, U.S.
- Education: University of North Carolina; Cumberland School of Law
- Occupations: Author, lawyer
- Known for: Author, speaker, politician
- Website: http://thereluctantrepublican.net/

Barbara Friers Olschner (born March 29, 1951) is a published author, speaker, lawyer and politician. Olshner ran for Congress as a moderate Republican in Florida's 2nd congressional district in 2010. In 2013, she published a book titled, The Reluctant Republican: My Fight for the Moderate Majority, released by the University Press of Florida, which is a non-fiction account of the 2010 race. The book received a lot of praise from the general public on her attempt to address extremism. She was also the founder and owner of the law firm Olschner & Hart in Birmingham, Alabama, and now practices law in Fairhope, Alabama. Olschner has over twenty-five years of litigation experience.

She is also the founder of the non-profit organization, Purple Moderates, which was established to "educate, inform and support" a moderate platform in politics.

== Early life ==
Olschner is a native of North Carolina who moved to Birmingham, Alabama, to practice law. After 30 years, she moved to Walton County, Florida, where she currently resides. She holds a Bachelor's degree in Creative Arts from the University of North Carolina and received her law degree from Cumberland School of Law, Samford University in Birmingham.
