= Florida's 17th House of Representatives district =

American legislative district

Florida's 17th State House of Representatives district
Representative
Jessica Baker; R–Jacksonville

Florida's 17th House of Representatives district elects one member of the Florida House of Representatives.

== Members ==
- Jim Tullis (until 2000)
- Stan Jordan (2000 to 2008)
- Lake Ray (2008 to 2012)
- Ronald 'Don' Renuart (2012 to 2016)
- Cyndi Stevenson (2016 to 2022)
- Jessica Baker (since 2022)
