= Sunita Dodani =

Pakistani-born American epidemiologist

- Born: Pakistan
- Education: Aga Khan University (MBBS); Dalhousie University (MSc); University of Pittsburgh (PhD)
- Known for: Community- and faith-based cardiometabolic prevention programs HEALS and HEALS Med-Tech
- Awards: Fellow of the American Heart Association
- Scientific career
- Fields: Epidemiology, Cardiology, Health equity
- Workplaces: University of Illinois College of Medicine Peoria; Eastern Virginia Medical School; University of Florida College of Medicine-Jacksonville; Mayo Clinic

Sunita "Soni" Dodani is a Pakistani-born American epidemiologist and professor of clinical medicine. Her work focuses on cardiovascular disease prevention, health equity, and community-based interventions. She is the founding director of the Center 4 Health Research at the University of Illinois College of Medicine Peoria and previously established the Eastern Virginia Medical School–Sentara Healthcare Analytics and Delivery Science Institute. Her research includes faith- and community-based programs such as Fit Body and Soul and the HEALS and HEALS Med-Tech initiatives.

== Early life and education ==
Dodani was born and raised in Pakistan. She contracted poliomyelitis at the age of two, which compelled her to pursue medicine and public health. She earned her medical degree from Aga Khan University in Karachi and completed a family medicine residency with training in cardiology. Later, she obtained a master's degree in epidemiology and community health from Dalhousie University in Halifax, and earned a PhD in epidemiology from the University of Pittsburgh. Her graduate and doctoral studies were supported in part by Fulbright scholarships. Her doctoral dissertation focused on building research capacity in Pakistan.

== Career ==
Dodani has held clinical and academic roles in the United States, including cardiology research at Mayo Clinic in Jacksonville and serving as assistant dean at the Medical College of Georgia at Augusta School of Nursing.

In 2012, Dodani joined the University of Florida College of Medicine-Jacksonville as a cardiovascular epidemiologist and associate professor. She later moved to Eastern Virginia Medical School, where she founded the EVMS-Sentara Healthcare Analytics and Delivery Science Institute. During the COVID-19 pandemic, she organized the Health Equity Collaborative of Virginia, and coordinated a multi-institution research on health disparities.

As of 2025, she serves as professor of clinical medicine and founding director of the Center 4 Health Research at the University of Illinois College of Medicine Peoria.

== Research ==
Dodani’s work has emphasized culturally tailored, community-based strategies for preventing type 2 diabetes and controlling hypertension, particularly within African American church communities. Early projects included *Fit Body and Soul*, a 12-session, lay-led lifestyle program adapted from evidence-based diabetes prevention curricula. She subsequently developed HEALS, a faith-based hypertension prevention and control program led by trained church members, reporting feasibility and improvements in blood pressure and self-management. The HEALS Med-Tech randomized trial integrated telehealth and behavioral counseling, showing reductions in systolic blood pressure at three and twelve months among African American participants.

Her research has also addressed cardiometabolic risk among South Asian immigrants in the United States, showing high rates of diabetes and probable coronary disease.

In digital health, Dodani has contributed to projects on remote data collection and mental health interventions, including the multi-institution COVIDsmart study and pilot research on digital cognitive behavioral therapy platforms during the pandemic. Her group has studied predictors of interest and engagement with digital mental-health tools in diverse populations.

== Awards and recognition ==
Dodani was a finalist for the American Heart Association's Mark Bieber Award and has received awards from the International Society on Hypertension in Blacks and the National Forum for Heart Disease and Stroke Prevention. She was cited in the National Forum's 2018 Annual Meeting program.

Sunita is also a Fellow of the American Heart Association. Earlier during her studies, she received university honors at the University of Pittsburgh.
