= Ronald Renuart =

Ronald "Doc" Renuart
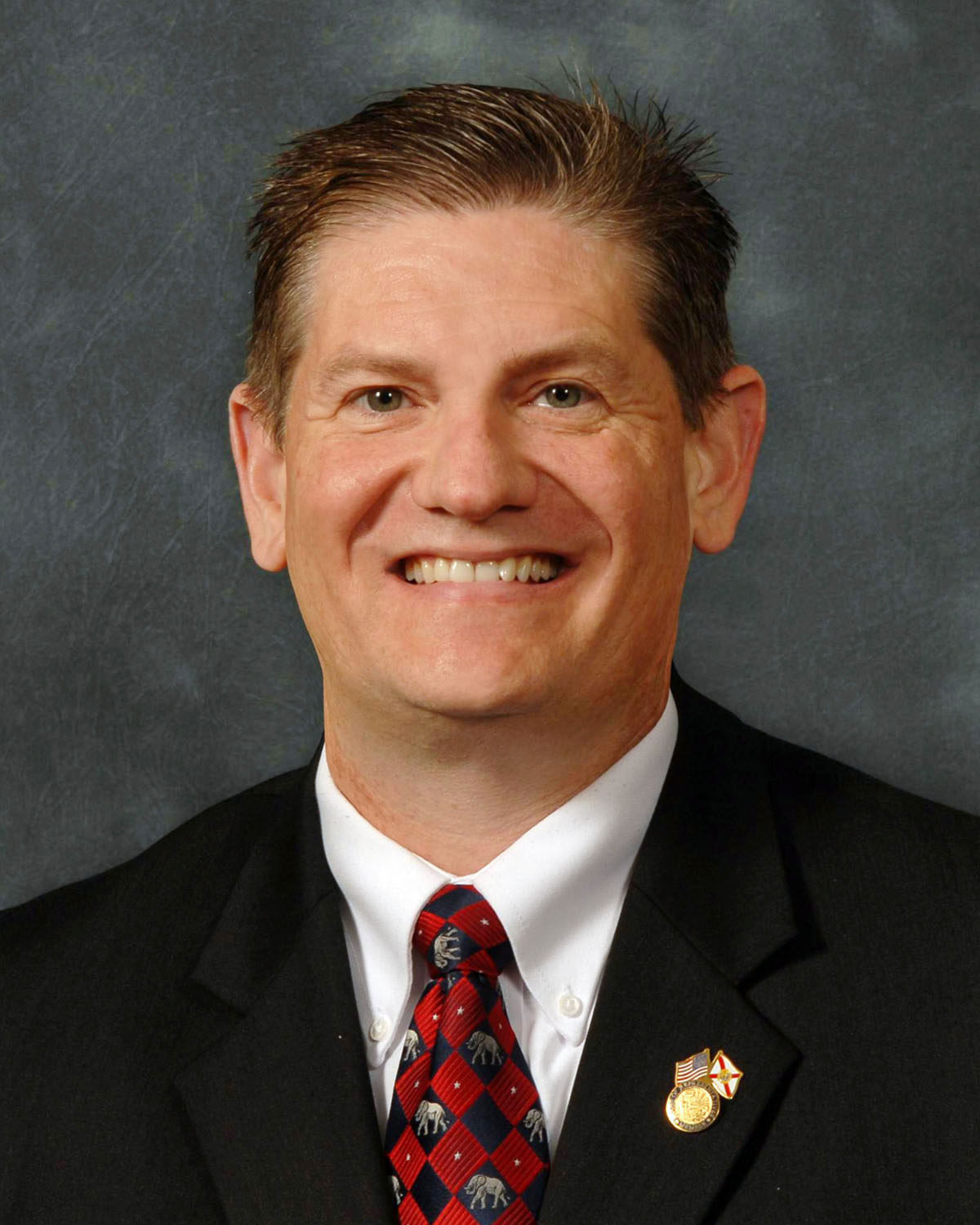

Member of the Florida House of Representatives
- In office November 4, 2008 – April 6, 2015
- Preceded by: Don Davis
- Succeeded by: Cyndi Stevenson
- Constituency: 18th district (2008–2012); 17th district (2012–2015)

Personal details
- Born: January 5, 1964 (age 62) Coral Gables, Florida
- Party: Republican
- Spouse: Tamara Ferrell Renuart
- Children: Jennifer; Scarlett; Ronald, Jr.; (step children) Christopher; Shannon; Matthew; Ashley
- Education: University of Florida (B.S.); Nova Southeastern University College of Osteopathic Medicine (D.O.)
- Profession: Osteopathic physician

Ronald "Doc" Renuart (born January 5, 1964) is a Republican politician who served as a member of the Florida House of Representatives, representing the 18th District from 2008 to 2012, and the 17th District from 2012 to 2015.

== History ==
Renuart was born in Coral Gables and attended the University of Florida, from which he graduated in 1986. While pursuing his first degree, he received an EMT certificate from Santa Fe College in 1985. Upon graduation, he attended Nova Southeastern University College of Osteopathic Medicine, where he received his Doctor of Osteopathic Medicine degree in 1990. After this, Renuart completed his internal medicine residency at the University of Florida Health Science Center Jacksonville, and enlisted in the Florida Army National Guard. From 1990 to 2010, he served as a medical officer in the National Guard, retiring as a Colonel and serving as a field surgeon, chief medical officer, and flight surgeon in Operation Iraqi Freedom and Operation Enduring Freedom, receiving the Florida Cross Medal and the Meritorious Service Medal in 2010 and the Order of Military Medical Merit in 2011.

== Florida House of Representatives ==
In 2008, incumbent State Representative Don Davis was unable to seek re-election due to term limits and Renuart ran to succeed him in the 18th District, which included parts of southeastern Duval County and northern St. Johns County, stretching from St. Augustine to Neptune Beach. Over the course of the election, Davis died, creating a vacancy that was not filled until the general election. Renuart raced Jacksonville City Councilwoman Elaine Brown and John R. Capra in the Republican primary, whom he easily defeated, winning 58% of the vote to Brown's 30% and Capra's 12%. In the general election, he faced Dave Smith, the Democratic nominee and the former President of the Concerned Taxpayers of Duval County, and independent candidate Daniel Walsh. Renuart defeated both opponents with ease, receiving 67% of the vote while Smith received only 30% and Walsh received 3%. When Renuart ran for re-election in 2010, he was opposed by Democratic nominee Tom Collins, a physicist. Renuart campaigned on his independence in the legislature, specifically noting that he broke with his party to oppose SunRail and casino gambling; he claimed that legalized casino gambling "would be too much of a moral plague on Florida families to justify potential revenues." In the end, Renuart won in a landslide, building on his 2008 victory, winning 74% of the vote to Collins' 26%.

In 2012, state legislative districts were redrawn and Renuart was moved into the 17th District, which dropped the Duval County excursion of his previous district for a greater slice of St. Johns County. He ran for re-election, and in the Republican primary faced building contractor Mike Davis, who was endorsed by Associated Industries of Florida, one of Florida's largest business lobbies, and community activist Kim Kendall. Renuart ended up defeating Davis and Kendall to win his party's renomination, but by a relatively slim margin; he won 39% of the vote to Davis's 31% and Kendall's 30%. In the general election, he was opposed by independent candidate Rebecca "Sue" Sharp, whom he easily defeated, winning re-election with 72% of the vote.

== Florida Senate campaign ==
When State Senator John E. Thrasher announced that he would resign from the legislature to serve as the President of Florida State University, a special election was held to replace him. Renuart announced that he would run, as did fellow State Representative Travis Hutson, and both submitted their resignations from the Florida House. Dennis McDonald, a former candidate for the Flagler County Commission, also announced that he would run. Renuart started out at a significant financial disadvantage to Hutson, as Hutson transferred $300,000 from his House re-election campaign to his Senate campaign. During the campaign, Renuart ran on his support for beach renourishment, for attracting businesses to the area to lessen the tax burden for district resident, and for offshore oil drilling. Despite the close nature of the campaign, Hutson ended up defeating Renuart and McDonald by a solid margin, receiving 52% of the vote to Renuart's 35% and McDonald's 13%.

Florida House of Representatives
Preceded by Don Davis	Member of the Florida House of Representatives from the 18th district 2008–2012	Succeeded by Travis Cummings
Preceded by Lake Ray	Member of the Florida House of Representatives from the 17th district 2012–2015	Succeeded by Cyndi Stevenson
