= Wolfson Children's Hospital =

Hospital in Florida, United States

- Baptist Health
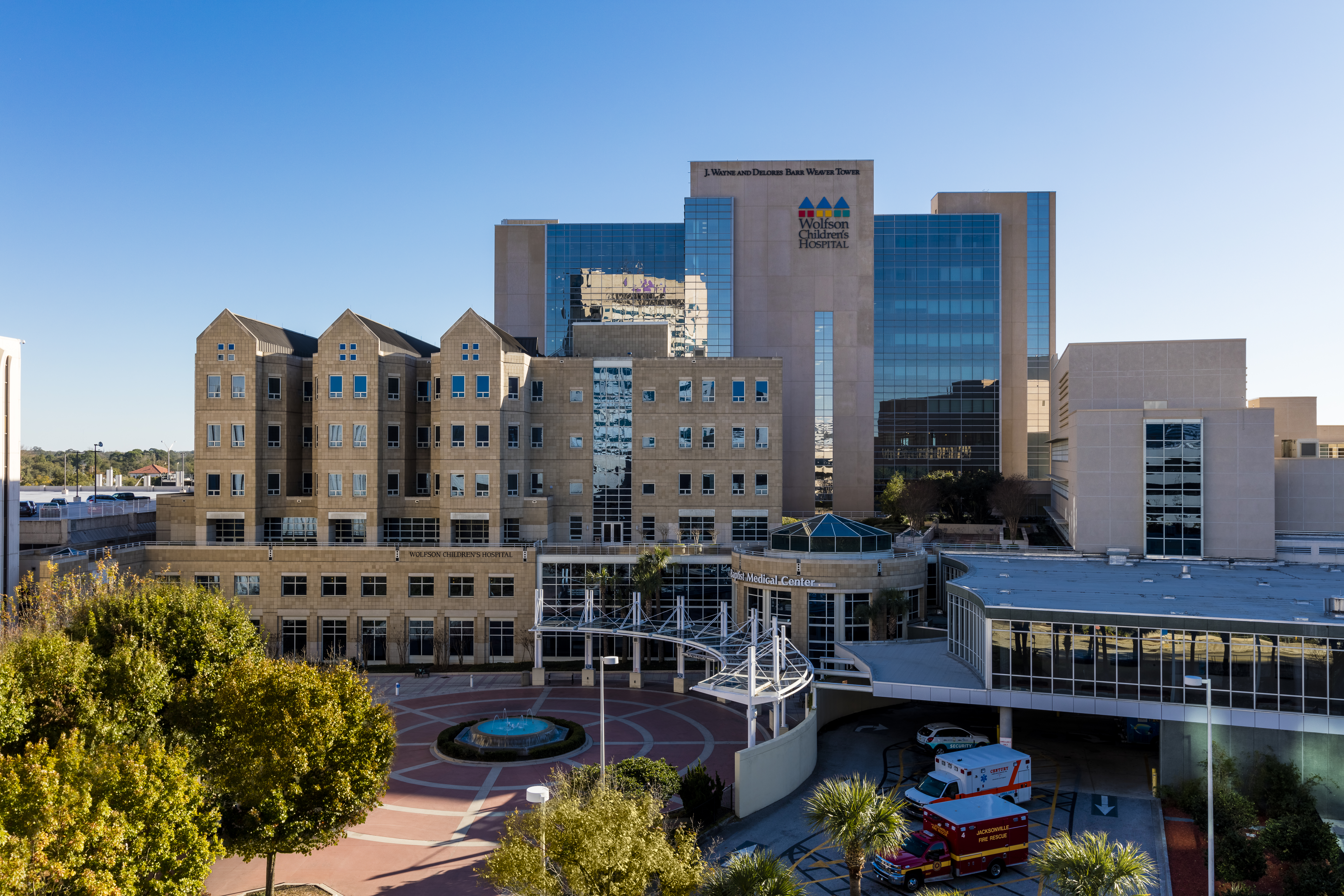
- The hospital pictured in 2016

Geography
- Location: 800 Prudential Drive, Jacksonville, FL, United States
- Coordinates: 30.315207°N 81.663234°W

Organization
- Care system: Children's hospital
- Type: Specialist
- Affiliated university: University of Florida College of Medicine-Jacksonville

Services
- Emergency department: Level I Pediatric Trauma Center
- Beds: 281
- Speciality: Pediatrics and pediatric subspecialties

Helipads
- Helipad: FAA LID: 7FD4 (Shared with Baptist Medical Center)
Number	Length		Surface
Number	ft	m	Surface
H1	150 x 100	46 × 30	concrete

History
- Founded: 1955: Inside of Baptist; 1993: Original Building; 2012: Weaver Tower; 2022: Critical Care Tower

Links
- Website: www.wolfsonchildrens.com
- Lists: Hospitals in the United States

Wolfson Children's Hospital is a nationally ranked, non-profit, pediatric acute care hospital located in Jacksonville, Florida. It has 281 beds and is the primary pediatric teaching affiliate of the University of Florida College of Medicine-Jacksonville and the Florida branch of the Mayo Clinic Alix School of Medicine. The hospital is a part of the Baptist Health system, and the only children's hospital in the system. It provides comprehensive pediatric specialties and subspecialties to pediatric patients throughout Jacksonville and the North Florida region, but also treats some adults that would be better treated under pediatric care. Wolfson Children's Hospital also features the only Florida Department of Health-designated pediatric trauma referral center in Jacksonville, Florida, and the only American College of Surgeons-verified, Level 1 pediatric trauma center in the region.

The hospital is situated on the St. Johns River waterfront in Downtown Jacksonville and is part of a large medical complex which also includes Baptist Medical Center Jacksonville, Baptist MD Anderson Cancer Center, and Nemours Children's Clinic.

== History ==
=== Wolfson Children’s Memorial Hospital (1955-1972) ===
In 1946, Morris David Wolfson wrote a letter to his sons, Sam Wolfson, Louis Wolfson, Saul Wolfson, Cecil Wolfson, and Nathan Wolfson asking them to build a children's facility in Jacksonville, Florida. A $500,000 donation from the Wolfson Family Foundation led to the establishment of Wolfson Children's Memorial Hospital, a 50-bed pediatric wing at Baptist Memorial Hospital (now Baptist Medical Center Jacksonville) in 1955.

=== Expansion of specialties and charter ===
The hospital grew incrementally during its early years, establishing a Cystic Fibrosis Center in 1963, a Children's Tumor Program in 1970 and an eight-bed Neonatal Intensive Care Unit in 1971. That same year, pediatricians with the Northeast Florida Pediatric Society signed an agreement stating that a consolidated center of excellence to be known as Jacksonville Children's Hospital would be the best way to serve the region's children and families. With the unveiling of a corporate charter in May 1971, Jacksonville Children's Hospital was incorporated as a pediatric inpatient facility within Wolfson Children's Memorial Hospital.

=== Jacksonville Children’s Hospital (1973-1979) ===
In April 1973, a 15-bed Pediatric Intensive Care Unit opened at Jacksonville Children's Hospital, increasing Wolfson Children's Memorial Hospital's bed capacity to 101. The hospital formed an auxiliary in June of that year, with volunteers serving throughout the facility and raising funds for special projects and facility expansion.

In 1976, Larry Freeman was appointed administrator of Jacksonville Children's Hospital. Ellen Cavert was elected chairman of the Women's Board of Jacksonville Children's Hospital with a mission to raise funds and awareness. In December 1977, the group held its inaugural Christmas antiques show to raise funds for the expansion of cancer treatment for children.

=== Jacksonville Wolfson Children’s Hospital (1980-1993) ===
In 1980, Jacksonville Children's Hospital was renamed Jacksonville Wolfson Children's Hospital. A pediatric radiology department was established in 1981 in memory of founding hospital trustee J.W. Hayes, MD. The Pediatric Urgent Care Center, an extension of the Emergency Center at Baptist Medical Center, opened in October 1985.

In 1987, Wolfson and Nemours Children's Specialty Care, Jacksonville, began their affiliation to better serve the area's children. Wolfson also began an academic affiliation with the University of Florida College of Medicine-Jacksonville in the 1990s, training pediatric residents, fellows and other professionals in pediatric medicine. In 2019, they began training anesthesia residents from Kendall Regional Medical Center. It is also serves as a pediatrics training site for physicians in the Mayo Clinic College of Medicine.

Plans were announced in January 1987 to replace the 95-bed Jacksonville Wolfson Children's Hospital with a freestanding facility on the campus of Baptist Medical Center to accommodate patients from the proposed $30 million Nemours Children's Clinic. The partnership between Baptist and Nemours will consolidate some specialized children's medical services and transfer others, like the cystic fibrosis and tumor programs. In May 1989, the inaugural Wolfson Children's Hospital Bass Tournament drew 252 boats. Proceeds benefited the hospital.

A nine-bed pediatric cancer unit opened in October 1989 for children with chronic health problems. The new wing included a playroom, a family room and extended visiting hours. In February 1990, the Neonatal Intensive Care Unit, which relocated to the Baptist Medical Pavilion in 1987, hosted its inaugural reunion at the Baptist Medical Center cafeteria.

In April 1990, Baptist Medical Center, University Medical Center, Nemours Children's Clinic and the University of Florida Health Science Center signed a letter of intent to create the Children's Health Center Association, a regional health care program for infants and children. The new consortium was designed to eliminate the duplication of medical services and provide comprehensive pediatric care, research, and education in the region. Wolfson also began an academic affiliation with the University of Florida College of Medicine-Jacksonville in the 1990s, training pediatric residents, fellows and other professionals in pediatric medicine. It is also serves as a pediatrics training site for physicians in the Mayo Clinic College of Medicine.

=== Wolfson Children’s Hospital (1992-present) ===
The inaugural season of the Florida Forum, a new fund-raising project of the Women's Board of Jacksonville Wolfson Children's Hospital, kicks off in 1992. The new facility is renamed Wolfson Children's Hospital in recognition of a multi-million-dollar gift from the Wolfson Family Foundation.

In 1993, a new Wolfson Children's Hospital opened, offering a range of inpatient and outpatient services, including a level III Neonatal Intensive Care Unit, Pediatric Intensive Care Unit, Children's Emergency Center, and specialized programs such as pediatric oncology, radiology, pathology and research.

A $4.3-million, elevated walkway connecting Wolfson Children's Hospital and Nemours Children's Clinic opened in April 1997. Kids Kare, a transport program for sick and injured children, including newborns, is established in 1998 and includes an ambulance with special medical equipment for children.

In 2005, Wolfson Children's Hospital marked its 50th anniversary. Physicians from the Mayo Clinic in Jacksonville, Nemours Children's Clinic, and the University of Florida College of Medicine practice at the 180-bed pediatric facility.

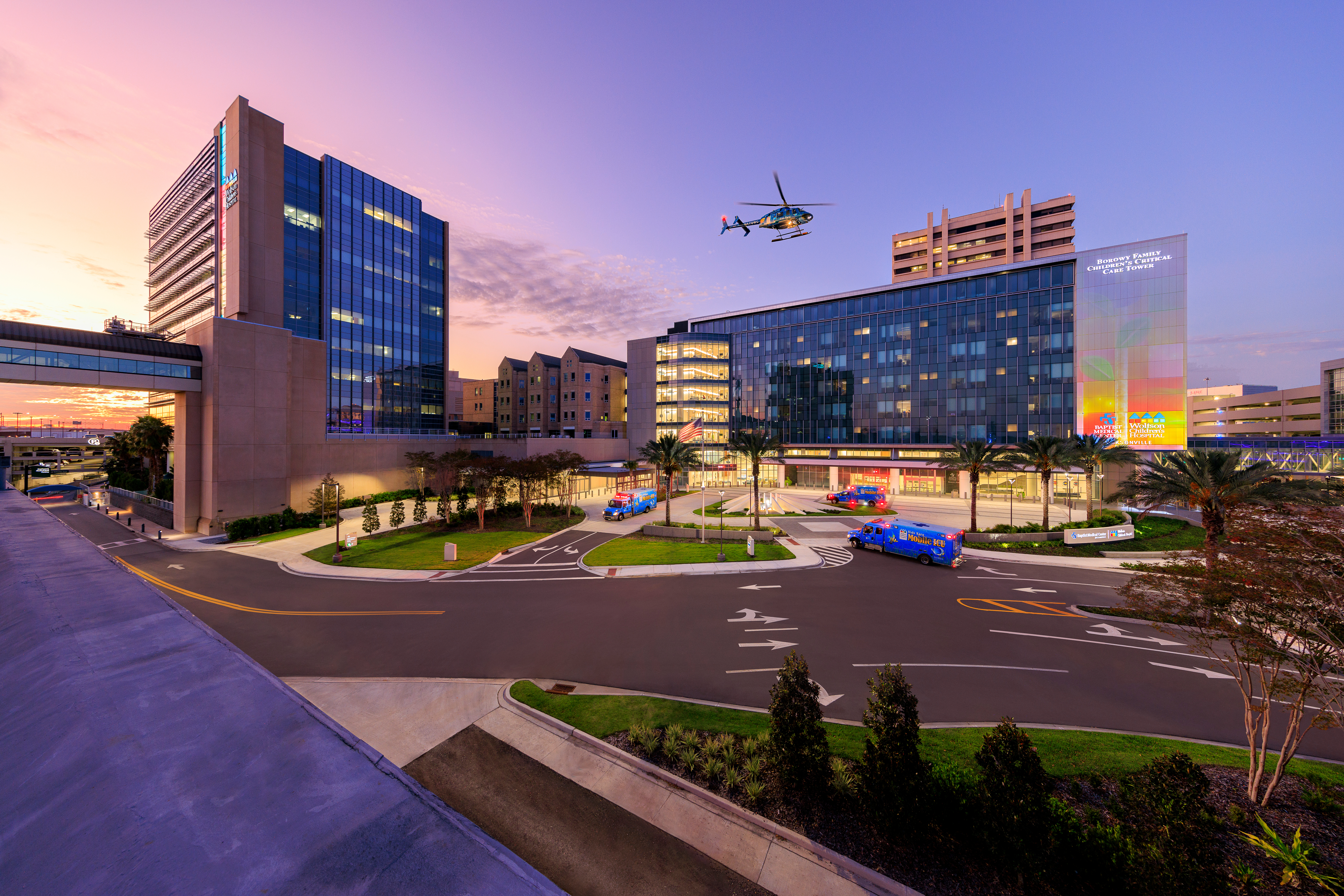
Wolfson Children's Hospital

The Drew Bradbury Center for Children's Rehabilitation Services opened in June 2006. The center is named in memory of a cystic fibrosis patient who died in 1994. Larry Freeman, the hospital's administrator since 1976, retired in December 2010. During Freeman's 34-year-tenure, Wolfson Children's grew into a 180-bed regional facility treating children from more than 40 countries. Michael D. Aubin, the founding administrator and CEO of St. Joseph's Children's Hospital in Tampa, Florida, succeeds Freeman on Jan. 1, 2011.

Since 2011, the hospital has also expanded regionally, opening Wolfson Children's Specialty Centers in Lake City, Florida; Daytona Beach, Florida; Brunswick, Georgia (in partnership with Southeast Georgia Health System); at the Baptist Clay Medical Campus in Fleming Island, Florida; and in Tallahassee, Florida (in partnership with Tallahassee Memorial HealthCare).

In 2012, Wolfson Children's Hospital expanded with the opening of the new J. Wayne and Delores Barr Weaver Tower on the Baptist Medical Center Jacksonville campus. The hospital continued to expand specialized services and to provide child health advocacy outside of hospital walls through The Players Center for Child Health, which offers education, childhood injury prevention, and legislative efforts to improve health care access for children.

The first of what is now five satellite Wolfson Children's Emergency Centers opened in May 2014, at Baptist Clay Medical Campus. In 2018, the Florida Department of Health named Wolfson Children's Hospital as the only state-designated Pediatric Trauma Referral Center in Northeast Florida. The designation continues until June 30, 2025.

In January 2020, Wolfson Children's Hospital opened up a new satellite pediatric emergency room at Baptist Medical Center South in Jacksonville and consists of 12 exam rooms.

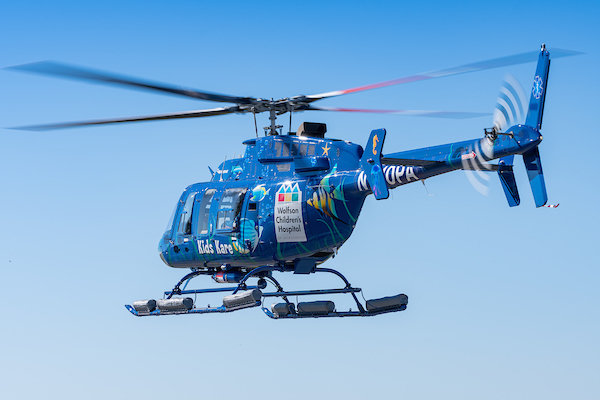
Kids Kare Critical Care Bell 407

The Kids Kare Critical Care and Trauma Transport Program unveiled a new helicopter, a Bell 407, in November 2020.

In February 2022, the hospital opened the 250,000-square-foot Wolfson Children’s Hospital Critical Care and Baptist Arrival Tower. The Borowy Family Children's Critical Care Tower opened in April 2022. The $224 million facility includes five floors dedicated to children's intensive care, including a three-floor NICU featuring a predictive analytics system and an in-NICU Magnetic Resonance Imaging system. The seven-story tower also includes a dedicated burn and wound unit.

Michael D. Aubin retired as hospital president in October 2022. During his 12-year tenure, Wolfson Children's was annually ranked among the 50 Best Children's Hospitals in the nation by U.S. News & World Report. He served as board president of the Florida Association of Children's Hospitals and as a trustee of the national Children's Hospital Association. Allegra Jaros became hospital president on January 16, 2023.

In November 2025, Wolfson Children's Hospital received $7.5 million from the Florida Cancer Connect Collaborative Research Incubator. The grant is renewable for five years funding advanced treatment options, recruiting pediatric oncologists, medical device infrastructure and research.

== About ==
A not-for-profit children's hospital that serves 82,000+ patients annually, plus nearly 90,000 children in its Emergency Centers, Wolfson Children's Hospital offers 40+ pediatric medical and surgical specialties through its long-time partnerships with Nemours Children's Health (Jacksonville), the University of Florida College of Medicine-Jacksonville, Mayo Clinic Florida in Jacksonville and UPMC Children's Hospital of Pittsburgh.

=== Foundation ===
In 1985, the Baptist Health Foundation was created to assist in fundraising for Baptist Health. The Foundation coordinates gifts and fundraising for Wolfson Children's Hospital in addition to four adult Baptist Health hospitals.

In May 1989, the inaugural Wolfson Children's Hospital Bass Tournament drew 252 boats. Proceeds benefited the hospital.

Another event is Christmas in July, held on July 25 each year, to collect toys and donations to help the hospital's Child Life Department normalize the hospital experience and provide distraction through toy and play.

=== Awards ===
In 2016, U.S. News & World Report named Wolfson Children's Hospital among the nation's top 50 hospitals for neurology and neurosurgery, and gastroenterology and GI surgery. Wolfson Children's Hospital achieved Magnet status by the American Nurses Credentialing Center in 2007 and again in 2012 and 2017, an international recognition of excellence in patient care.

In 2019 the hospital was awarded the status of "top children's hospital" by The Leapfrog Group's children's hospital rankings, one of seven nationwide.

As of 2020-21 Wolfson Children's Hospital has placed nationally in all 3 out of 10 ranked pediatric specialties on U.S. News & World Report: Best Children's Hospital rankings. In addition, the hospital is ranked as #5 the best children's hospital in Florida.

2025 U.S. News & World Report Rankings for Wolfson Children's Hospital
Specialty	Rank (In the U.S.)
Pediatric & Adolescent Behavioral Health	Top 50
Pediatric Neurology & Neurosurgery	#50

== See also ==
- List of children's hospitals in the United States
- Mayo Clinic Alix School of Medicine
