= Cyndi Stevenson =

American politician (born 1960)

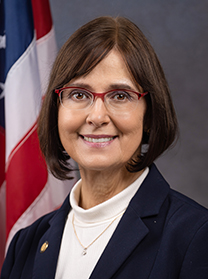

Member of the Florida House of Representatives
- In office April 8, 2015 – November 5, 2024
- Preceded by: Ronald Renuart
- Succeeded by: Kim Kendall
- Constituency: 17th district (2016–2022); 18th district (2022–2024)

Personal details
- Born: February 20, 1960 (age 66) Daytona Beach, Florida, U.S.
- Party: Republican
- Spouse: Henry Stevenson
- Children: 2
- Education: Stetson University (BBA)
- Profession: Certified Public Accountant (CPA)

Cynthia "Cyndi" Ward Stevenson is an American politician who served as a Republican member of the Florida House of Representatives from 2015 through 2024.

== Early life and education ==
Stevenson, whose maiden name is Ward, was born in Daytona Beach, Florida, where she was active in 4-H. She graduated from Stetson University with a bachelor's degree in Business Administration with a major in Accounting in 1981. She is a Certified Public Accountant.

== St. Johns County Commission ==
In 2004, Stevenson ran for the St. Johns County Commission from District 1, facing businessman Jack Boyd, former County Commissioner Pal West Howell, and civil engineer Cheryl Robitzsch in the Republican primary, which was opened to all voters because no other candidates filed. She raised more money than any of the other candidates, built up her knowledge of the issues by regularly attending County Commission meetings, and campaigned on maintaining public education and the county's high quality of life. Stevenson emerged narrowly victorious, receiving 36% of the vote to Boyd's 34%, Howell's 15%, and Robitzsch's 15%. In 2008, when she ran for re-election, she was challenged by Albert Abbatiello, who served as a Supervisor on the Julington Creek Plantation Community Development District, in the Republican primary. Abbatiello attacked Stevenson for approving too many residential developments, but Stevenson argued that her decision to approve developments is not based on a "batting average." Ultimately, Abbatiello did not present a serious challenge to Stevenson, and she won renomination with 67% of the vote. In the general election, she faced Merrill Paul Roland, an independent candidate, and won re-election easily with 79% of the vote.

When she ran for re-election to a third term in 2012, she faced a stiff challenge in the Republican primary from Brian Iannucci, a businessman and a member of the St. Augustine Tea Party. Iannucci attacked Stevenson for approving a property tax increase, and argued that the county could have dipped into its reserve fund instead. Stevenson responded that property taxes have decreased in the county consistently since 2007, and that the county was statutorily-prohibited from using the reserve funds unless there was an emergency. Owing to the competitive nature of the race, Stevenson only narrowly won renomination, winning 54% of the vote to Iannucci's 46%. In the general election, she faced independent candidate Merrill Paul Roland once again, and, just like four years prior, defeated him in a landslide with 77% of the vote.

== Florida House of Representatives ==
In 2015, when incumbent State Representative Ronald Renuart resigned to run in a State Senate special election, Stevenson, who was already planning on running when Renuart was term-limited in 2016, decided to run in the special election to succeed him. She announced that she would run her campaign on job development, public education, and preserving the county's quality of life, and emphasized her experience on the County Commission. She faced Mike Davis, a construction company owner, and Frank Capra, an attorney and a former Vero Beach City Councilman, in the Republican primary. The Florida Times-Union, though praising Davis for his "strong background" and Capra for his "interesting resume," strongly endorsed Stevenson, citing her "depth of thought" and "open mind," noting that her experience "stands out." She narrowly emerged victorious over her opponents by just a three hundred vote margin, winning 42% of the vote to Davis's 39% and Capra's 19%. In the general election, Stevenson was opposed by Judy Stevens, an independent candidate and businesswoman. In the general election, Stevenson was once again endorsed by the Times-Union, which praised her "knowledge and impressive work ethic," and cited her willingness to consider Medicaid expansion. She was also endorsed by The St. Augustine Record, which, though it praised Stevens, called Stevenson out for being "one of the more moderate, yet consistent, voices on the County Commission" and noted, "She clearly has the advantage in terms of readiness to make a difference in the Florida House." Unlike the primary election, the general election was not competitive at all, and Stevenson won her first term in the legislature handily, scoring 78% of the vote to Stevens' 22%.
