= Baptist Health (Jacksonville) =

Faith-based health system in the southern United States

Coordinates: 30.315614°N 81.6634342°W

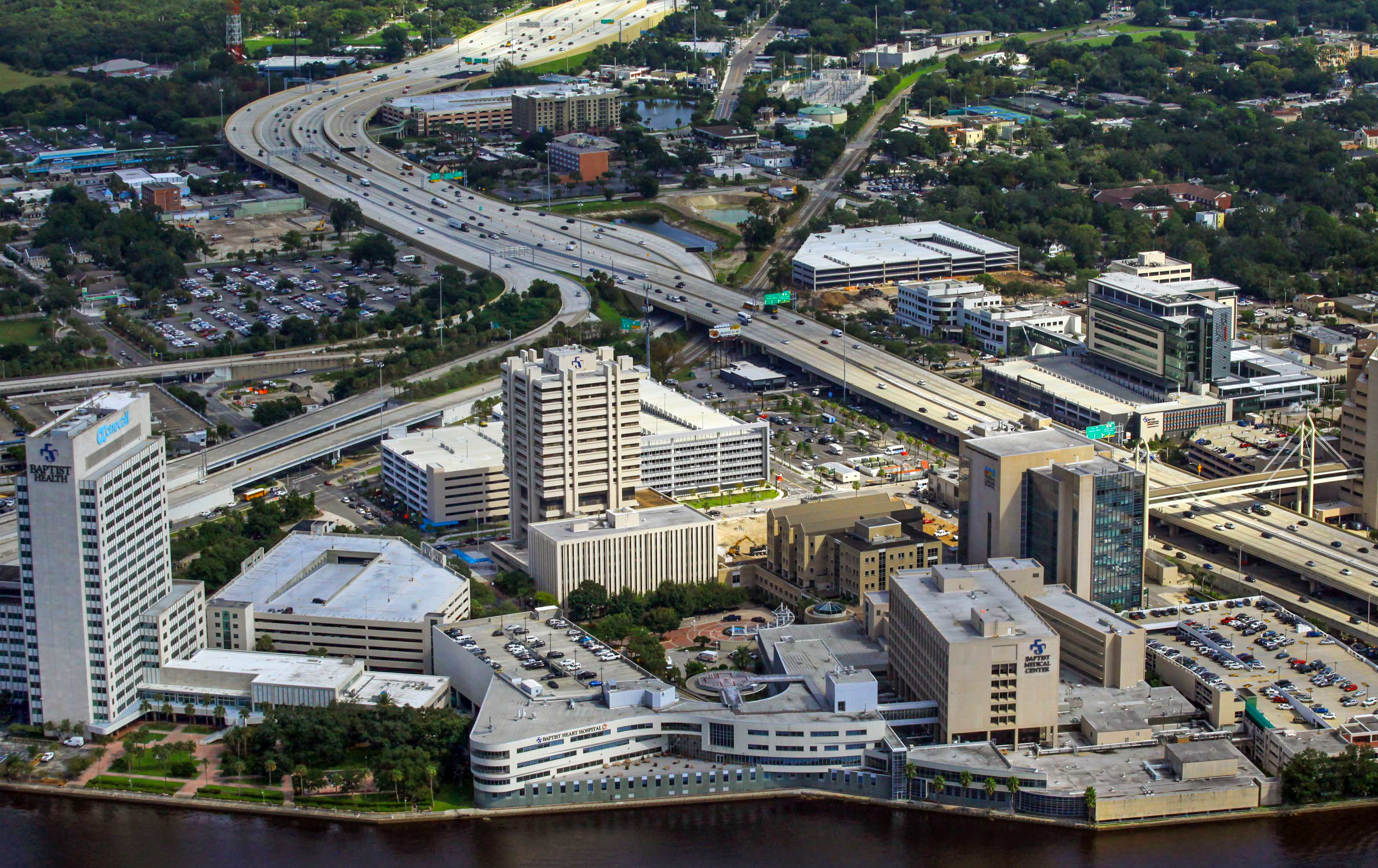
- Industry: Healthcare
- Genre: Nonprofit hospital network
- Founded: 1955
- Founder: Southern Baptist Convention
- Headquarters: Jacksonville, Florida, United States
- Number of locations: 6 Hospitals (2025)
- Key people: Matthew A. Zuino (CEO)
- Services: Hospital administration, Health care, Cardiology, Oncology, Neurology, Neurosurgery, Orthopedics, Pediatrics, Childbirth, Women's Health
- Subsidiaries: Wolfson Children's Hospital
- Website: www.baptistjax.com

Baptist Health (Jacksonville) is a faith-based, non-profit health system comprising six hospitals with 1,461 beds, a cancer center, 12 satellite emergency departments and more than 200 patient access points of care, including 50 primary care offices located throughout northeast Florida and southeast Georgia. The headquarters are in Jacksonville, Florida.

== History ==
=== Baptist Memorial Hospital (1947–1976) ===
Baptist Memorial Hospital was established in 1947 when the executive committee of the Southern Baptist Convention, based in Nashville, Tennessee, responded via telegram to the critical shortage of hospital beds identified by community leaders in Jacksonville, Florida. That telegram, sent to the pastor of the Southside Baptist Church in Jacksonville, announced that the convention had authorized the establishment of a new, faith-based community hospital. The Convention estimated a total of $2 million for the construction of the hospital. $1 million was public funds and another $250,000 provided by the Hospital Board. Local contributions to the development of the hospital exceeded $1 million, which included a donation of $250,000 in 1951 from the Wolfson Family Foundation for the development of a 50-bed children's hospital within Baptist Memorial.

Baptist Memorial opened in 1955 with 125 rooms, including 35 beds in Wolfson Memorial Children's Hospital, and was accredited in 1956 by the Joint Commission on Accreditation of Hospitals in Chicago. Accreditation is required for hospitals to receive payment from federally funded Medicare and Medicaid programs. A 28-bed medical-surgical unit was established on the fifth floor at Baptist Memorial in early 1957, bringing the total capacity at that time to 202 beds. To meet increased demand for private rooms for patients, Baptist Memorial converted 14 semi-private rooms into private rooms. By late 1957, Baptist Memorial grew to 268 rooms and had more than 300 physicians on staff.

==== Expansion of facilities and medical specialties ====
Baptist Memorial expanded its services with the Charles Judson Williams Cancer Treatment Center within the hospital on March 2, 1972. The cancer treatment center was dedicated to the late Mr. Williams, a Jacksonville businessman, and a philanthropist who died in 1956. His widow, Edna Sproull Williams, donated funds to equip the cancer treatment center with equipment that was considered state-of-the-art at the time.

Also, in 1972, Jacksonville Children's Hospital opened within the former Wolfson Memorial's facilities. That was followed a year later by the opening of the Wolfson Family Medical Tower, bringing the total bed count for Baptist facilities in Jacksonville to 579. Baptist Memorial added to its array of medical specialties in 1974 with the opening of a Gastroenterology Lab to focus on digestive system disorders. The Women's Board of Jacksonville Children's Hospital was established in 1973. Women's boards serve as a volunteer-driven source of philanthropy for hospitals.

=== Baptist Medical Center (1977–2002) ===
The facility changed its name from Baptist Memorial Hospital to Baptist Medical Center on September 13, 1977. “Today, the hospital is an eight-building institution containing the equipment, facilities, and modalities necessary to care for more than 20,000 patients a year,” said Richard H. Malone, executive director of the Medical Center at the time, as quoted in the Florida Times-Union newspaper. Further expansion of Baptist Medical Center in 1977 included the establishment of an oncology service for the treatment of cancer and related diseases. Dr. Curtis M. Phillips was named head of the service's surgical division and Dr. Neil Abramson was appointed the head of the medical division. Cancer-related care such as diagnostics, medical, surgical, radiation, and rehabilitation oncology already existed within the Baptist hospital system. Baptist Medical Center's Life Flight airborne ambulance service was launched in 1980. Life Flight's genesis was Malone's vision, which began back in the 1970s, when he worked with the US Department of Transportation to start an air-ambulance service. Baptist Medical Center named Dr. Doris Carson the president of its medical staff in 1981, the first woman chosen for such a position for any hospital in the Jacksonville area.

Baptist Medical Center (BMC) in 1982 became the first hospital in the U.S. to make itself energy independent, converting to a $3 million dual-fueled energy system for its four hospital buildings. It was equipped with turbines that switch from natural gas to oil and back again without losing power. The governor of Florida at the time, Bob Graham, appeared at BMC for ceremonies on September 9 to officially turn the switch on for the new power plant.

In 1985, the Baptist Health Foundation was created to assist in fundraising. The Baptist Health Foundation was originally called the Foundation for Healthcare Inc. It dates back to the work of the BMC Development Council and the BMC Development Fund to raise $7 million towards the development of the BMC's Pavilion building project in January 1985. Construction of the 17-story BMC Pavilion ended in June 1985. The foundation was later renamed the Baptist Health System Foundation Inc. in 1992.

Baptist Regional Cancer Institute opened in September 1991. Baptist Health acquired, in 1994, Nassau General Hospital (NGH) from Nassau County. Because the hospital was county-owned, the Florida Legislature had to pass legislation authorizing the NGH Board of Trustees to sell the hospital to Baptist Health. Under BHS ownership, the hospital runs by a board of BHS executives and local community leaders.

Baptist Medical Center and St. Vincent's Health System merged, creating Baptist St. Vincent's Health System in 1995. In March 2000, the two hospitals announced they would operate independently.

=== Baptist Health (2003–present) ===
In 2006, Lyerly Neurosurgery, Florida's first neurosurgical practice, dating to 1934, affiliated with Baptist Health to form Baptist Lyerly Neurosurgery, offering a full range of neurosurgical services for the brain, spinal column and nervous system. In 2010, Baptist Health formed the Baptist Neurology Group. Baptist Health earned its first recognition for its delivery of neurological care when it received Primary Stroke Care Certification in 2007 from The Joint Commission on Accreditation of Healthcare Organizations. Specifically, it was for the stroke care provided at Baptist Medical Center Downtown and Baptist Medical Center South in Jacksonville.

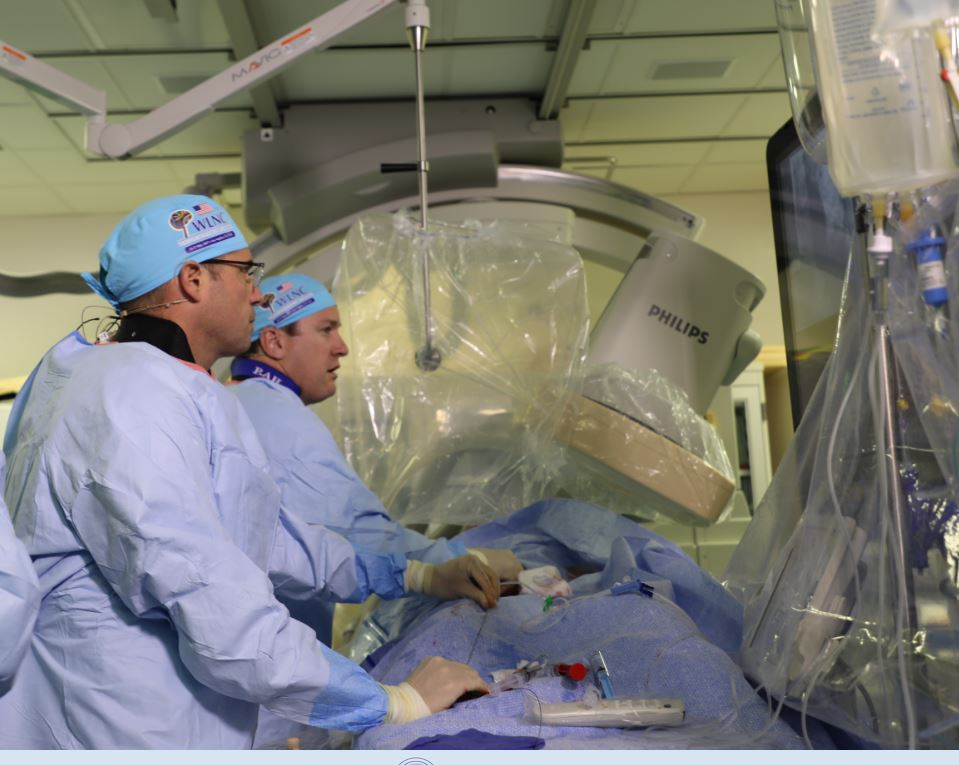
Lyerly neurosurgeons at Baptist Health

Baptist Health earned its first "Magnet" designation in 2007 for the quality of nursing care throughout its five-hospital system. Baptist Health earned Magnet re-designation in 2012, 2017, and 2022. The Magnet title was awarded by the American Nurses Credentialing Center, which is part of the American Nurses Association.

In 2012, Baptist Heart Specialists, a full-spectrum specialty practice for cardiology services, was formed when Jacksonville Heart Group and Southern Heart Group became a division of Baptist Health. In 2015, electrophysiologists with Baptist Heart Specialists were the first in Florida to implant the world's smallest wireless pacemaker. In 2013, Baptist Health opened its first ambulatory campus, Baptist Clay, featuring a 16-bed adult and pediatric emergency room and a medical office building. In April 2016, Baptist Health opened its second satellite emergency center, Baptist Town Center, followed in September 2016 with its third satellite emergency center and second ambulatory campus, Baptist North. In November 2019, Baptist Health opened its fourth satellite emergency center, Baptist Oakleaf. On April 17, 2015, Baptist Health and The University of Texas MD Anderson Cancer Center signed an agreement to build a joint cancer treatment center in northeast Florida.The new nine-story addition to Baptist MD Anderson Cancer Center in Jacksonville was completed in the fall of 2018. The 330,000-square-foot building, which took two years to build at a cost of $184 million, expanded the MD Anderson Cancer Center model of cancer treatment that was first brought to Northeast Florida in 2015. The opening enabled Jacksonville to take part in MD Anderson's clinical trials. In an era of medical research where new cancer drugs are increasingly being developed, local access to such advances, such as in the Jacksonville area, was considered critical.

In 2015, Baptist Health established the Stroke & Cerebrovascular Center at Baptist Jacksonville. The center is certified by The Joint Commission and the American Heart Association/American Stroke Association as a Comprehensive Stroke Center.

Brett McClung became CEO on July 1, 2019, following the retirement of Hugh Greene after he served 20 years as CEO. Baptist Health named Michael A. Mayo CEO in June 2021 after he served in an interim capacity.

In April 2025, Baptist Health added a Bell 407 helicopter equipped with an upgraded autopilot system to its airborne emergency department. The helicopter can respond to emergencies within a roughly 100-mile radius of Jacksonville. In September 2025, Baptist Medical Center Jacksonville and Wolfson Children’s Hospital broke ground on a four-story, 123,000-square-foot emergency and patient tower. It will house two distinct emergency centers one for adults and another for children. The tower plans have a total of 100 emergency patient rooms and 68 inpatient rooms. In January 2026, Matthew A. Zuino became CEO of Baptist Health, succeeding Michael A. Mayo.

== Hospitals ==
The hospital network includes six hospitals:

- Baptist Medical Center Jacksonville
- Wolfson Children’s Hospital
- Baptist Medical Center South
- Baptist Medical Center Beaches
- Baptist Medical Center Nassau
- Baptist Medical Center Clay

=== Baptist Medical Center Jacksonville ===
Situated on the St. Johns River waterfront in Downtown Jacksonville, the 513-bed Baptist Medical Center Jacksonville is part of a large medical complex which also includes the adjacent Wolfson Children's Hospital and Baptist MD Anderson Cancer Center.

In the early 1990s, the hospital's name was changed to Baptist Medical Center Downtown and the hospital is now called Baptist Medical Center Jacksonville. The center provides services in cardiovascular, oncology (cancer) (including gynecological), women's health (including obstetrics and gynecology, orthopaedics, pediatrics, ophthalmology, emergency care (including LifeFlight air ambulance, a Children's Emergency Center and hyperbaric medicine), critical care medicine, bloodless surgery, pulmonary services (including an adult/pediatric sleep disorders center), pastoral care, radiology, rehabilitation and psychiatry/psychology. They also have a regional referral center at Baptist MD Anderson Cancer Center.

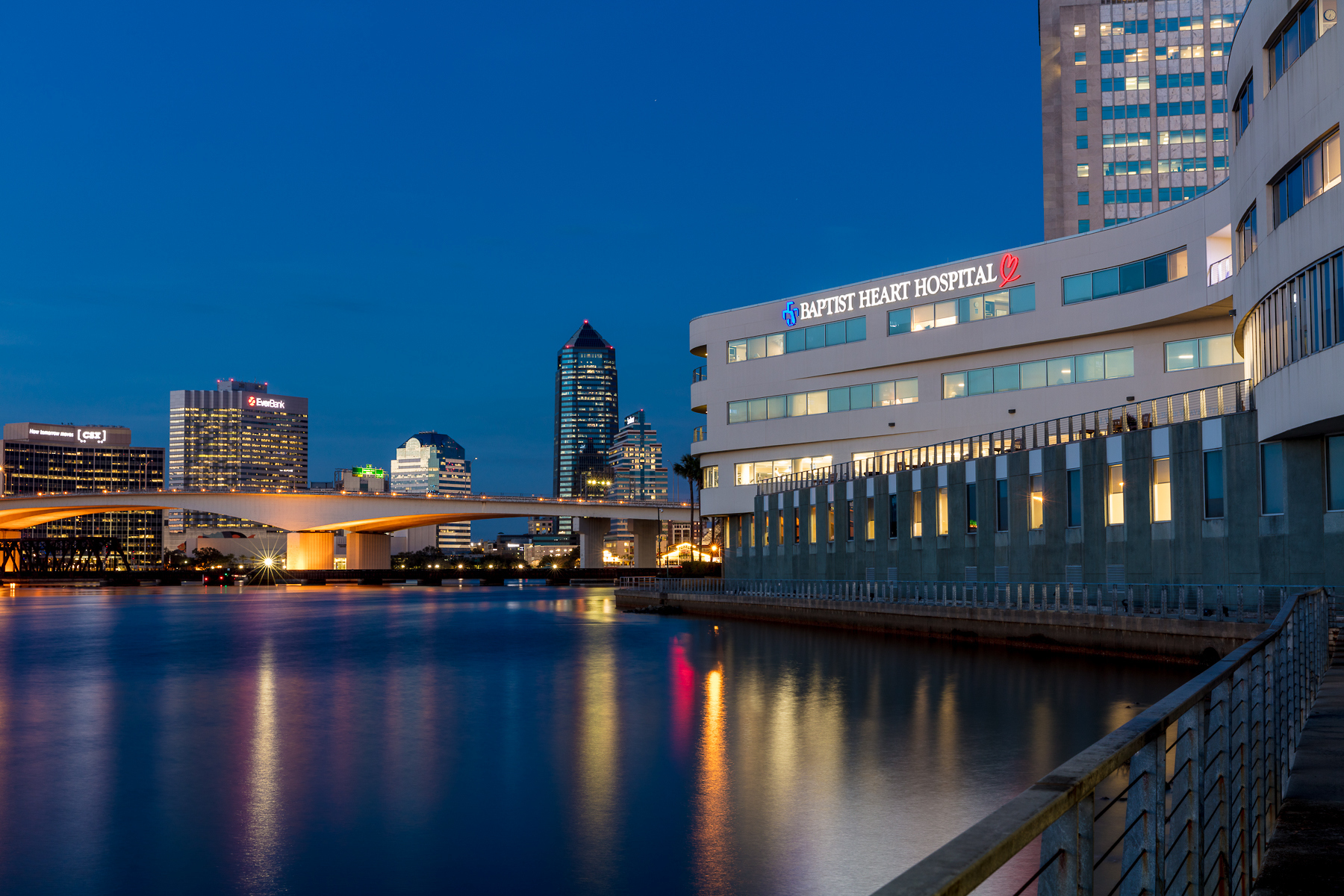
Baptist Heart Hospital

Baptist Medical Center integrated the Baptist Heart Hospital at its campus in downtown Jacksonville in 2005. The project reorganized existing cardiology services into a 195,000 square-foot space. Baptist Heart Hospital is staffed by more than 500 physicians, nurses and team members. It has three operating rooms, several laboratories, a rehabilitation center, and focuses on heart and vascular care. Baptist Heart Hospital performed about 8,000 cardiovascular services in 2004. It also has 120 private beds and two ICUs.

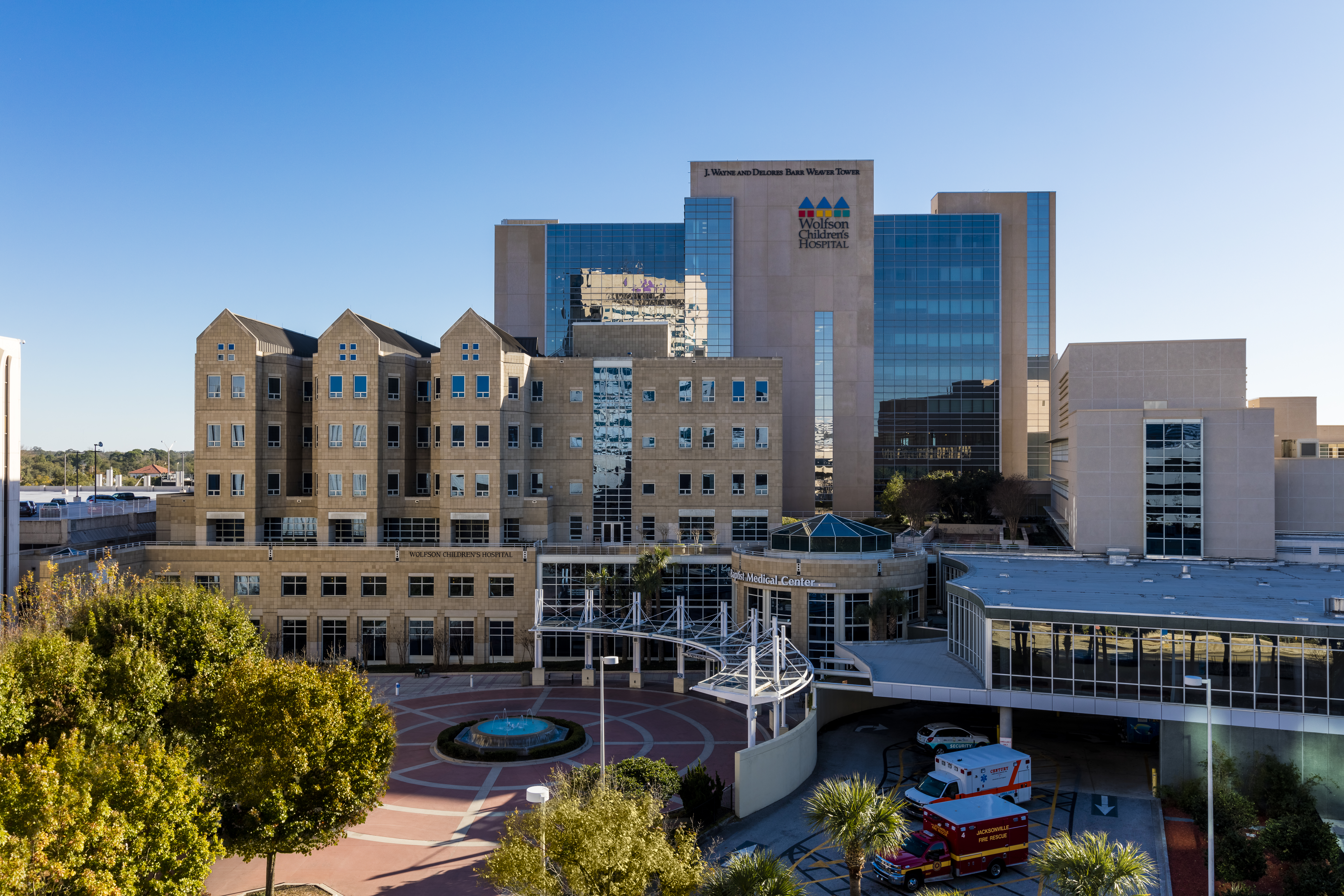
Wolfson Children's Hospital

=== Wolfson Children's Hospital ===
Located next to Baptist Medical Center Jacksonville in Downtown Jacksonville is the 281-bed Wolfson Children's Hospital. The hospital has a long-time partnership with the adjacent Nemours Children's Health specialty care clinic, and is the main pediatric training site of the University of Florida College of Medicine-Jacksonville. It also provides training for physicians in the Jacksonville campus of the Mayo Clinic Alix School of Medicine.

In 1946, Louis Wolfson's family foundation donated $500,000 to create Wolfson Children’s Hospital. The facility opened in 1955 as a wing in the Baptist Memorial Hospital with 50 beds. In 1971, Baptist Memorial established the Neonatal Intensive Care Unit within the Wolfson Memorial Children's Hospital. That was followed a year later by the opening of the Pediatric Intensive Care Unit. Baptist Medical Center paid tribute to one of its chief benefactors, the Wolfson Family Foundation, by renaming Jacksonville Wolfson Children's Hospital as Wolfson Children's Hospital in 1992. The $45 million, 180-bed hospital opened on November 13, 1993.

Wolfson Children's Hospital was named the only state-designated Pediatric Trauma Referral Center in Northeast Florida, the Florida Department of Health announced on July 2, 2018.

In February 2022, the hospital opened the 7-story, 225,000-square-foot Borowy Family Children’s Critical Care Tower and Baptist Jacksonville Entry Building.

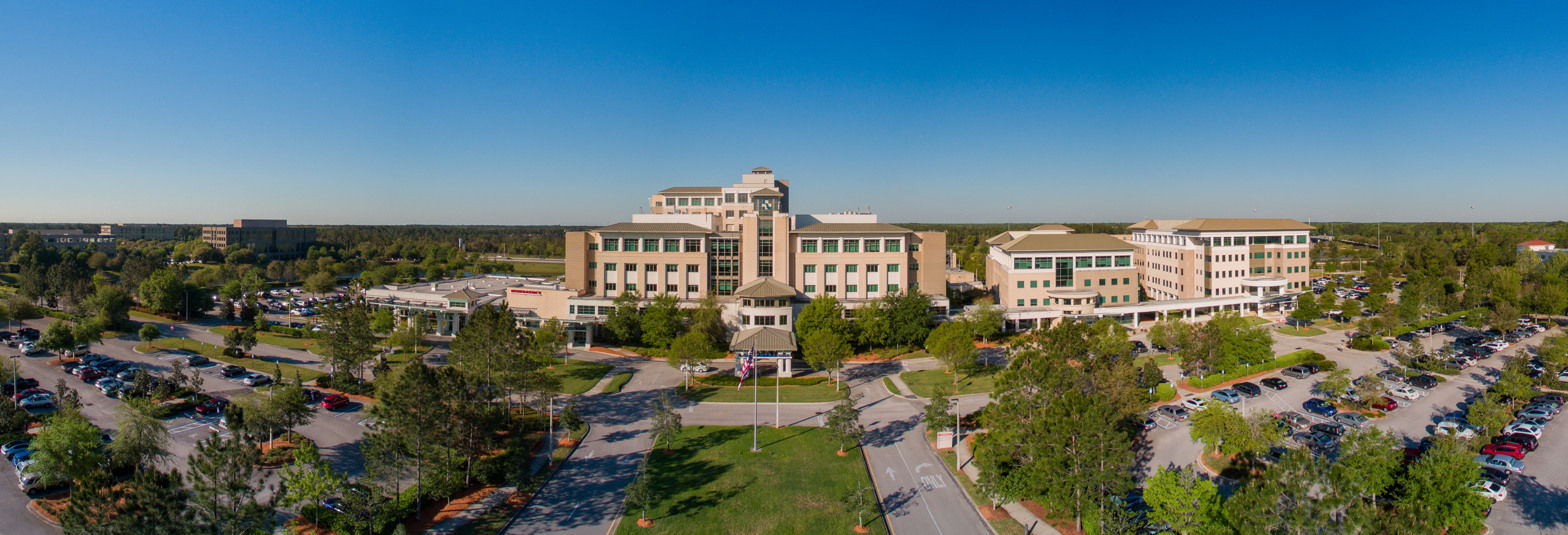
Baptist Medical Center South

=== Baptist Medical Center South ===
Baptist South was opened in February 2005. In June 2007, construction began on a new patient care tower that further increased patient care capacity, including a Newborn Intensive Care Unit that is part of Wolfson Children's Hospital's services. In September 2011, Baptist South opened a new cardiac catheterization lab.

In 2016, Nicole Thomas became the first female hospital president at Baptist Health. Thomas oversees Baptist Medical Center South. In 2019, Baptist Health opened a new 12-room Wolfson Children’s Hospital pediatric emergency center at Baptist Medical Center South.

In 2021, Kyle Dorsey was named president of Baptist Health Medical Center South.

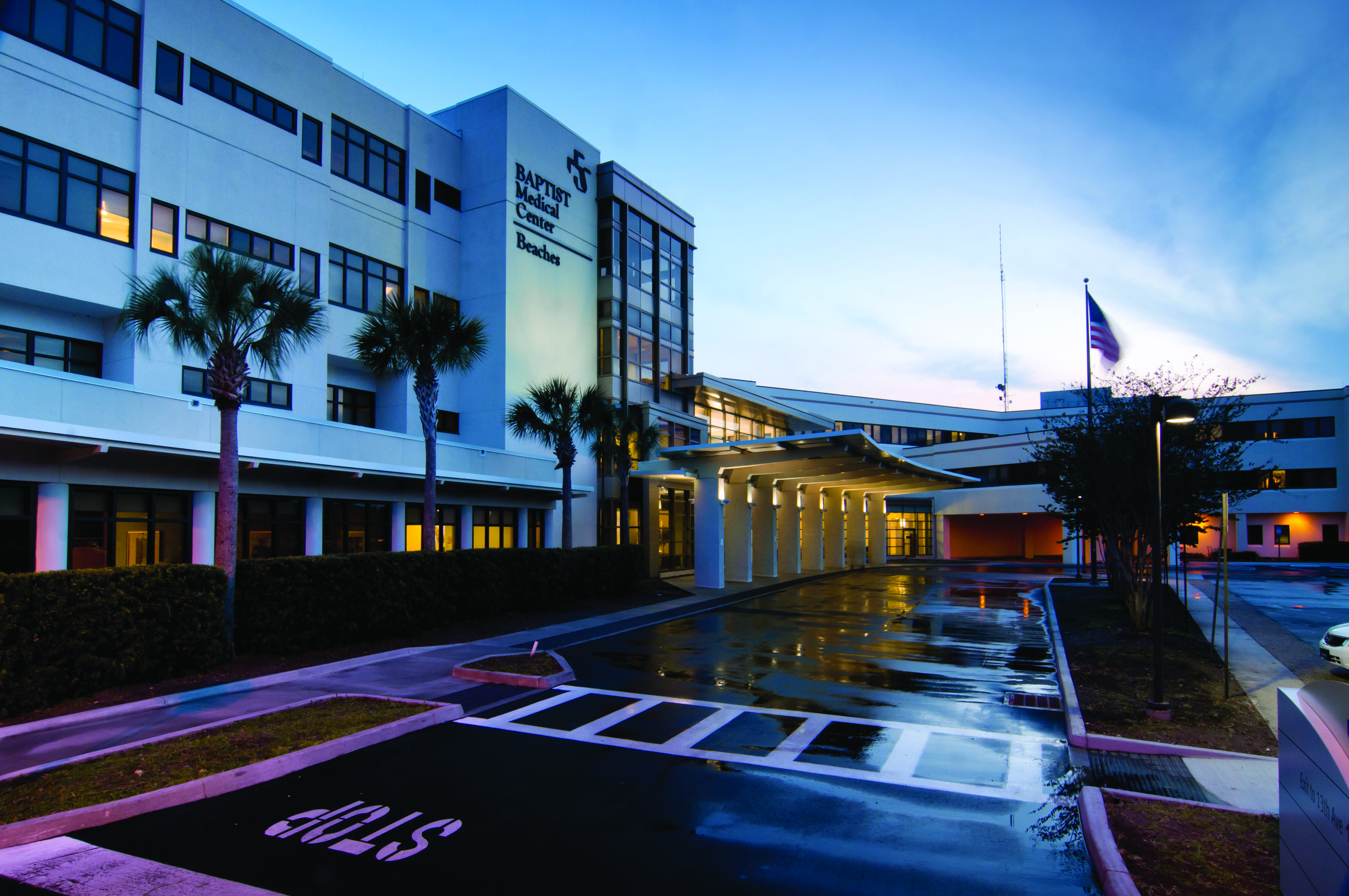
Baptist Beaches main entrance

=== Baptist Medical Center Beaches ===
Beaches Hospital originally opened in Jacksonville Beach in 1961 and was replaced by the First Coast Medical Center in November 1988. Baptist Health acquired First Coast Medical Center in November 1993 and named it Baptist Medical Center Beaches.

In 2011, Baptist Health opened an outpatient surgical center at Baptist Beaches. The center was replaced in 2018 by the surgical pavilion at Baptist Beaches.

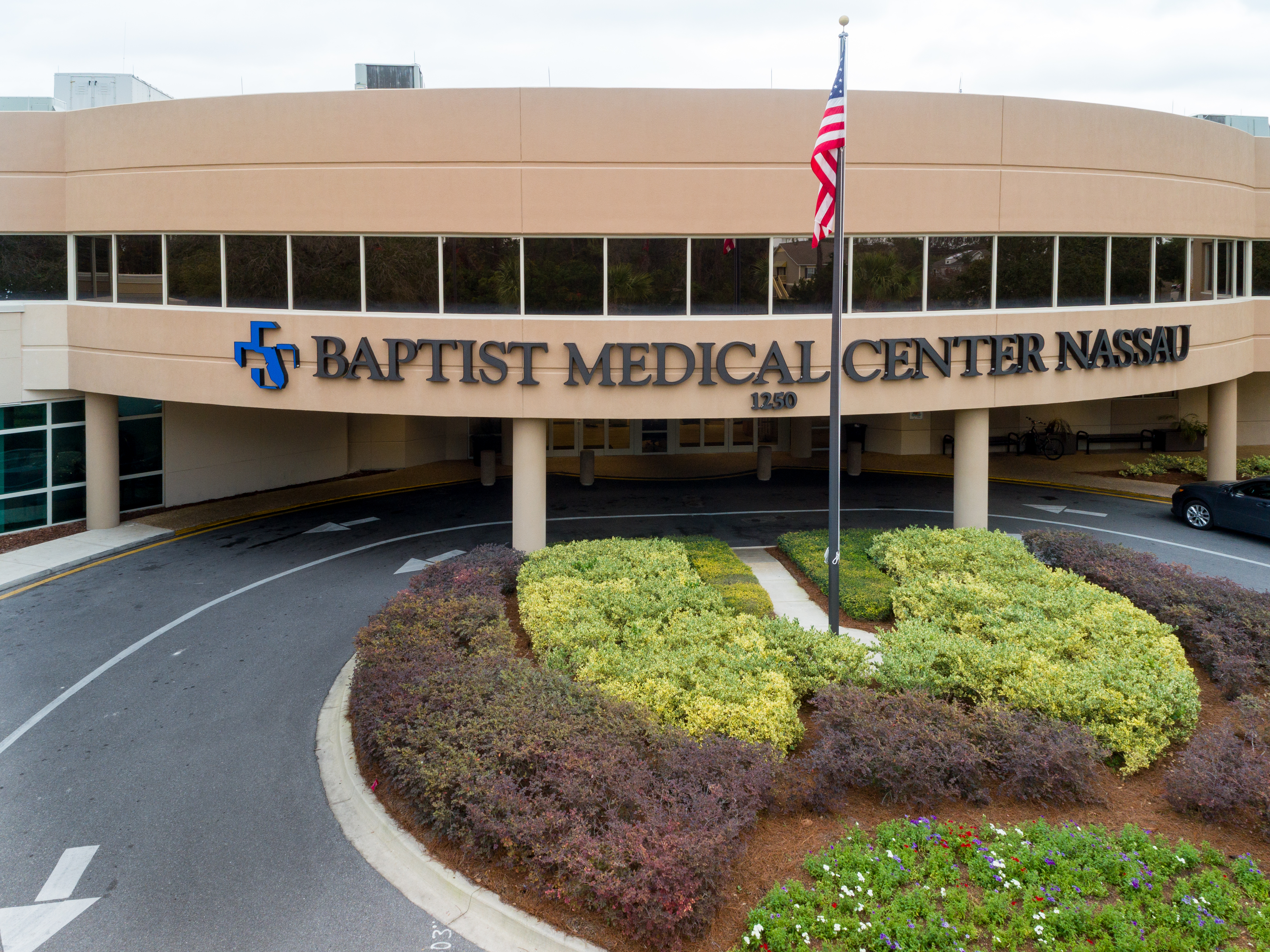
Baptist Nassau main entrance

=== Baptist Medical Center Nassau ===
A full-service hospital opened in Fernandina, Florida in 1942, relocating in the 1970s to Lime and South 18th Streets. In 1994, it was acquired by Baptist Health. Soon after Baptist Health acquired Nassau General Hospital in 1994, the ground was broken on the expansion project, which added about 50% to the hospital's size. At the 1997 dedication ceremonies for that project, the ground was broken on another project to add a medical office building.

In 2009, The Betty and David Berkman Building for Patient Care opened with 48 patient rooms, including an eight-bed ICU unit. Baptist Health opened a surgery center at Baptist Nassau in 2018.

=== Baptist Medical Center Clay ===
Baptist Clay Medical Campus opened in Clay County on May 1, 2013. The facilities included Baptist/Wolfson Children's Emergency Center for children and adults, along with Diagnostics & Imaging at Baptist Clay (providing imaging for adults and children). In January 2020, Baptist Health began development of a full-service, 100 bed hospital on the campus. In December 2022, Baptist Medical Center Clay in Fleming Island began admitting patients.
