= List of Phi Delta Epsilon chapters =

Phi Delta Epsilon is an international professional fraternity for medical and pre-medical students. The following is a list of Phi Delta Epsilon chapters, broken into two tables. The first is for medical school chapters and the second is for pre-medical chapters. Pre-medical chapters use a two- or three-letter state/province abbreviation in their names. Chapters established before 1962 are noted in Baird's Manual (20th ed), while newer chapters are from the fraternity's website. Active chapters are indicated in bold. Inactive chapters or institutions are in italics.

== Medical chapters ==
Chapter	Chartered date and range	Institution	Location	Status	References
Alpha	1904–1955	Cornell University	Ithaca, NY	Inactive	
Beta	1905–1965	New York University	Manhattan, NY	Inactive	
Gamma	1905–1959	Columbia University	Manhattan, NY	Inactive	
Delta				Unassigned ?	
Epsilon				Unassigned ?	
Zeta	1906–1958	SUNY Downstate Medical Center	Brooklyn, NY	Inactive	
Eta				Unassigned ?	
Theta	1907–1921	Fordham University	Bronx, NY	Inactive	
Iota	1907–193x ?	College of Physicians and Surgeons	Baltimore, MD	Inactive	
Kappa (see Kappa Pi)	1907–195x ?	Medico-Chirurgical College (Perelman, UPenn)	Philadelphia, PA	Consolidated	
Lambda	1907–1933	Johns Hopkins University	Baltimore, MD	Inactive	
Mu	1916–198x ?	Jefferson Medical College	Philadelphia, PA	Inactive	
Nu	1911–198x ?	University of Pittsburgh	Pittsburgh, PA	Inactive	
Xi	1913–1918	Loyola University Medical Center	Maywood, IL	Inactive	
Omicron	1913–198x ?	New York Medical College	Manhattan, NY	Inactive	
Pi ? (see Kappa Pi)	191x ?–19xx ?	University of Pennsylvania	Boston, MA	Consolidated ?	(Note: While missing from Baird's Manual (20th) and not listed on the national website, it appears this chapter existed, then merged with the earlier-formed Kappa chapter on the Penn campus to form Kappa Pi chapter with the consolidation of the schools.)
Rho	1916–1933	Harvard University	Boston, MA	Inactive	
Sigma	1916–198x ?	Temple University	Philadelphia, PA	Inactive	
**Tau**	January 1, 1919–1942; 1943–1958; 196x ?	SUNY Upstate Medical University (as Syracuse University)	Syracuse, NY	Active	
Upsilon	1919–198x ?	Case Western Reserve University	Cleveland, OH	Inactive	
**Phi**	December 15, 1920	University of Louisville	Louisville, KY	Active	
**Chi**	January 1, 1921	Ohio State University	Columbus, OH	Active	
Psi	1920–198x ?	George Washington University	Washington, D.C.	Inactive	
Omega	1921–198x ?	University of Michigan	Ann Arbor, MI	Inactive	
Alpha Alpha	1918–198x ?	University of Illinois	Chicago, IL	Inactive	(Note: The establishment date and name of this chapter implies that it was either the product of a later merger, keeping the name of the older chapter, or that the second series of chapters began to be used before the completion of the first series.)
Alpha Beta	1918–198x ?	Northwestern University	Chicago, IL	Inactive	
Alpha Gamma	1918–1949	Rush Medical College	Chicago, IL	Inactive	
**Alpha Delta**	January 1, 1918	Wayne State University	Detroit, MI	Active	
Alpha Epsilon	1918–19xx ?; 1979–199x ?	University of Massachusetts Medical School	Worcester, MA	Inactive	
Alpha Zeta	1918–19xx ?	College of Physicians and Surgeons	San Francisco, CA	Inactive	
Alpha Eta	1918–198x ?	University of Southern California	Los Angeles, CA	Inactive	
Alpha Theta	1918–198x ?	Tufts University School of Medicine	Boston, MA	Inactive	
Alpha Iota	1918–198x ?	Tulane University	New Orleans, LA	Inactive	
Alpha Kappa	1922–1959	Washington University in St. Louis	St. Louis, MO	Inactive	
Alpha Lambda	1922–198x ?	Medical College of Wisconsin	Milwaukee, WI	Inactive	
Alpha Mu	1923–198x ?	Medical College of Virginia	Richmond, VA	Inactive	
Alpha Nu	1923–198x ?	University of Texas Medical Branch	Galveston, TX	Inactive	
Alpha Xi	1922–196x ?	University of Minnesota	Minneapolis, MN	Inactive	
Alpha Omicron	1923–198x ?	Boston University	Boston, MA	Inactive	
Alpha Pi	1924–198x ?	St. Louis University	St. Louis, MO	Inactive	
Alpha Rho	1924–1960	Yale University	New Haven, CT	Inactive	
Alpha Sigma	1924–198x ?	University of Toronto	Toronto, ON, Canada	Inactive	
Alpha Tau	1924–1959	Indiana University	Indianapolis, IN	Inactive	
Alpha Upsilon	1924–2046	University of Virginia	Charlottesville, VA	Inactive	
Alpha Phi	1925–198x ?	University of California	San Francisco, CA	Inactive	
Alpha Chi	1925–1936; 1945–1959	Creighton University	Omaha, NE	Inactive	
Alpha Psi	1926–198x ?	University of Wisconsin–Madison	Madison, WI	Inactive	
Alpha Omega	1926–1936	University of Oregon	Portland, OR	Inactive	
Beta Alpha	1968–19xx ?	New Jersey Medical School	Newark, NJ	Inactive	
Beta Beta	1926–198x ?	University of Colorado	Denver, CO	Inactive	
**Beta Gamma**	January 1, 1926–1932; 19xx ?	University of Kansas	Kansas City, KS	Active	
Beta Delta	1926–1933	McGill University	Montreal, QC, Canada	Inactive	
Beta Epsilon	1928–198x ?	University of Cincinnati	Cincinnati, OH	Inactive	
Beta Zeta	1929–198x ?	Hahnemann Medical College	Philadelphia, PA	Inactive	
Beta Eta	1929–1956	University of Tennessee College of Medicine	Memphis, TN	Inactive	
Beta Theta	1929–198x ?	Baylor University	Houston, TX	Inactive	
Beta Iota	1929–198x ?	Medical College of Georgia	Augusta, GA	Inactive	
Beta Kappa	1929–1942	State University of Iowa	Iowa City, IA	Inactive	
Beta Lambda	1930–1939; –1943–1961	University of Vermont	Burlington, VT	Inactive	
Beta Mu	1930–1947	Dalhousie University	Halifax, NS, Canada	Inactive	
Beta Nu	1930–198x ?	Emory University	Atlanta, GA	Inactive	
Beta Xi	1935–198x ?	Georgetown University	Washington, D.C.	Inactive	
Beta Omicron	1938–198x ?	Louisiana State University	New Orleans, LA	Inactive	
Beta Pi	1943–198x ?	UT Southwestern Medical School	Dallas, TX	Inactive	
Beta Rho	1944–1954	University of Nebraska Omaha	Omaha, NE	Inactive	
Beta Sigma	1949–1959	Medical College of South Carolina	Charleston, SC	Inactive	
**Beta Tau**	January 1, 1949	Chicago Medical School	Chicago, IL	Active	
Beta Upsilon	1951–1953	SUNY Buffalo	Buffalo, NY	Inactive	
Beta Phi	1953–198x ?	UCLA	Los Angeles, CA	Inactive	
Beta Chi	1953–198x ?	University of Miami	Miami, FL	Inactive	
Beta Psi	1980–199x ?	University of Toledo Medical Center	Toledo, OH	Inactive	
Beta Omega	1968–198x ?	Michigan State University	East Lansing, MI	Inactive	
Delta Alpha	1982–198x ?	Uniformed Services University of the Health Sciences	Bethesda, MD	Inactive	
**Delta Beta**	January 1, 1981	Northeast Ohio Medical University	Kent, OH	Active	
Delta Gamma	1989–199x ?	UC San Diego	San Diego, CA	Inactive	
Delta Delta	1983–199x ?	Stanford University	Palo Alto, CA	Inactive	
Delta Epsilon	1912–198x ?	University of Maryland	Baltimore, MD	Inactive	
Delta Zeta	1992–199x ?	University of Florida	Gainesville, FL	Inactive	
Delta Eta	1986–199x ?	University of South Florida	Tampa, FL	Inactive	
Delta Iota	1989–199x ?	Eastern Virginia Medical School	Norfolk, VA	Inactive	
Delta Kappa	1990–199x ?	Oklahoma State University Center for Health Sciences	Tulsa, OK	Inactive	
Delta Lambda	1990–199x ?	Des Moines University	Des Moines, IA	Inactive	
Delta Omicron	1988–199x ?	Kirksville College of Osteopathic Medicine	Kirksville, MO	Inactive	
Delta Chi	1971–198x ?	Howard University College of Medicine	Washington, DC	Inactive	
Kappa Pi	1907–198x ?	University of Pennsylvania	Philadelphia, PA	Inactive	
Kappa Rho	1962–198x ?	University of California Irvine	Irvine, CA	Inactive	
**Kappa Psi**	September 9, 1978	University of Kentucky	Lexington, KY	Active	
Upsilon Theta	1979–199x ?	University of Texas Medical School	Houston, TX	Inactive	
District 14	1979–20xx ?	Autonomous University of Guadalajara	Guadalajara, Mexico	Inactive	
District 13		Vanderbilt University School of Medicine	Nashville, TN	Inactive ?	
Delta Psi	2007–20xx ?	University of Alabama Birmingham	Birmingham, AL	Inactive	
Delta Omega	2007–20xx ?	Royal College of Surgeons in Ireland	Dublin, Ireland	Inactive	
**Epsilon Alpha**	November 17, 2007	Universidad de Monterrey	Monterrey, Mexico	Active	
**Epsilon Beta**	December 1, 2007	Ross University School of Medicine	Portsmouth, Dominica	Active	
Epsilon Gamma	2008–20xx ?	Midwestern University	Downers Grove, IL	Inactive	
**Epsilon Delta**	August 15, 2008	American University of Antigua	Antigua	Active	
Epsilon Epsilon	2008–20xx ?	Cleveland Clinic Lerner College of Medicine	Cleveland, OH	Inactive	
Epsilon Zeta Colony	2008–20xx ?	University of Arkansas for Medical Sciences	Little Rock, AR	Inactive	
**Epsilon Eta**	October 16, 2010	Marshall University School of Medicine	Huntington, WV	Active	
**Epsilon Theta**	May 28, 2011	Medical University of Gdańsk	Gdańsk, Poland	Active	
**Epsilon Iota**	December 2, 2015	University of Nevada School of Medicine	Reno, NV	Active	
**Epsilon Kappa**	April 2, 2016	Stony Brook University SOM	Stony Brook, NY	Active	
Epsilon Lambda	2017–20xx ?	University of Illinois College of Medicine at Peoria	Peoria, IL	Inactive	
**Epsilon Mu**	March 10, 2018	Mercer University School of Medicine	Savannah, GA	Active	
**Epsilon Nu**	February 24, 2018	University of Nevada, Las Vegas School of Medicine	Las Vegas, NV	Active	
Epsilon Xi				Unassigned ?	
**Epsilon Omicron**	February 7, 2019	Kansas City University	Kansas City, MO	Active	
**Epsilon Pi**	August 29, 2020	Rowan-Virtua School of Osteopathic Medicine	Stratford, NJ	Active	
**Epsilon Rho**	June 5, 2021	Geisel School of Medicine at Dartmouth	Hanover, NH	Active	
**Epsilon Sigma**	April 2, 2022	Rocky Vista University College of Osteopathic Medicine	Englewood, CO	Active	
**Epsilon Tau**	March 12, 2022	Nova Southeastern College of Osteopathic Medicine	Davie, FL	Active	
**Epsilon Upsilon**	April 1, 2023	Geisinger Commonwealth School of Medicine	Scranton, PA	Active	
**Epsilon Phi**	March 11, 2023	FIU Herbert Wertheim College of Medicine	Miami-Dade County, FL	Active	

== Pre-medical chapters ==
Chapter	Chartered date and range	Institution	Location	Status	References
NY Alpha	1994–November 2023	Binghamton University	Binghamton, NY	Inactive	
CAN Alpha	1994–20xx ?	McGill University	Montreal, QC, Canada	Inactive	
NY Beta	1995–20xx ?	St. Lawrence University	Canton, NY	Inactive	
OH Alpha	1995–199x ?	Wright State University	Dayton, OH	Inactive	
**TX Alpha**	1996–199x ?; November 2, 2019	University of Texas San Antonio	San Antonio, TX	Active	
NY Gamma	1996–19xx ?	Manhattan College	Bronx, NY	Inactive	
**OH Beta**	April 3, 1996	Kent State University	Kent, OH	Active	
**GA Alpha**	April 21, 1996	Oglethorpe University	Atlanta, GA	Active	
**GA Beta**	1996–20xx ?; October 28, 2017	Emory University	Atlanta, GA	Active	
IL Alpha	1996–20xx ?	Chicago State University	Chicago, IL	Inactive	
MI Alpha	1996–20xx ?	Eastern Michigan University	Ypsilanti, MI	Inactive	
**NY Delta**	December 7, 1996	SUNY Albany	Albany, NY	Active	
NY Epsilon	1997–19xx ?	Marist College	Poughkeepsie, NY	Inactive	
NY Zeta	1997–19xx ?	Clarkson University	Potsdam, NY	Inactive	
CA Alpha	1997–20xx ?	Pepperdine University	Malibu, CA	Inactive	
**CAN Beta**	October 31, 1998	Simon Fraser University	Burnaby, BC, Canada	Active	
**KY Alpha**	December 16, 1998	Transylvania University	Lexington, KY	Active	
NY Beta	2001–20xx ?	SUNY Buffalo	Buffalo, NY	Inactive	
**AZ Alpha**		University of Arizona	Tucson, AZ	Active	
**KY Beta**	January 24, 2003	University of Louisville	Louisville, KY	Active	
NJ Alpha	2003–20xx ?	Ramapo College	Mahwah, NJ	Inactive	
**CA Beta**	May 11, 2003	UC San Diego	San Diego, CA	Active	
CA Gamma	2004–November 2023	UCLA	Los Angeles, CA	Inactive	
**CA Delta**	2004–201x ?; May 11, 2013	UC Riverside	Riverside, CA	Active	
**CA Epsilon**	January 1, 2004	UC Irvine	Irvine, CA	Active	
CA Zeta	2005–20xx ?	Concordia University	Irvine, CA	Inactive	
**CA Eta**	September 27, 2005	University of San Diego	San Diego, CA	Active	
**OH Gamma**	April 22, 2006	Miami University	Oxford, OH	Active	
**NY Theta**	January 27, 2007	New York University	New York, NY	Active	
**NY Iota**	January 28, 2007	Hofstra University	Long Island, NY	Active	
**FL Alpha**	March 1, 2007	Florida International University	Miami, FL	Active	
**CAN Gamma**	March 24, 2007	University of British Columbia	Vancouver, BC, Canada	Active	
**CA Theta**	May 12, 2007	California State University, Northridge	Los Angeles, CA	Active	
**OH Delta**	September 28, 2007	Case Western Reserve University	Cleveland, OH	Active	
CA Iota	2007–201x ?	University of California, Berkeley	Berkeley, CA	Inactive	
**CA Kappa**	January 19, 2008	University of California, Davis	Davis, CA	Active	
**IL Beta**	February 16, 2008	University of Illinois at Urbana Champaign	Urbana, IL/Champaign, IL	Active	
**NJ Beta**	October 4, 2008	Rutgers University	New Brunswick, NJ	Active	
**DE Alpha**	November 8, 2008	University of Delaware	Newark, DE	Active	
NY Kappa	2008–201x ?	United States Military Academy	West Point, NY	Inactive	
**GA Gamma**	April 25, 2009	Georgia Southern University	Statesboro, GA	Active	
**FL Beta**	September 26, 2009	University of Central Florida	Orlando, FL	Active	
**OH Epsilon**	October 3, 2009	University of Akron	Akron, OH	Active	
**CA Lambda**	March 21, 2010	UC Merced	Merced, CA	Active	
CA Mu	2010–201x ?	Azusa Pacific University	Azusa, CA	Inactive	
**FL Gamma**	October 2, 2010	University of Miami	Coral Gables, FL	Active	
**KS Alpha**	October 9, 2010	University of Kansas	Lawrence, KS	Active	
**MI Beta**	October 20, 2010	Saginaw Valley State University	Saginaw, MI	Active	
DC Alpha	2011–201x ?	Howard University	Washington, DC	Inactive	
**MO Alpha**	February 26, 2011	Rockhurst University	Kansas City, MO	Active	
**IL Gamma**	April 16, 2011	Northwestern University	Evanston, IL	Active	
**OH Zeta**	May 7, 2011	The Ohio State University	Columbus, OH	Active	
**NY Lambda**	September 10, 2011	Cornell University	Ithaca, NY	Active	
FL Delta	2011–201x ?	Florida Atlantic University	Boca Raton, FL	Inactive	
**MA Alpha**	December 10, 2011	University of Massachusetts Boston	Boston, MA	Active	
**NY Mu**	February 18, 2012	Stony Brook University	Stony Brook, NY	Active	
**NY Nu**	April 14, 2012	Syracuse University	Syracuse, NY	Active	
**MI Gamma**	October 13, 2012	University of Michigan–Dearborn	Dearborn, MI	Active	
**NV Alpha**	December 8, 2012	University of Nevada, Reno	Reno, NV	Active	
**OH Eta**	January 10, 2013	Ohio University	Athens, OH	Active	
**KY Gamma**	March 2, 2013	University of Kentucky	Lexington, KY	Active	
**IN Alpha**	March 3, 2013	Indiana University	Bloomington, IN	Active	
**MI Delta**	March 16, 2013	University of Michigan	Ann Arbor, MI	Active	
**IA Alpha**	September 28, 2013	Drake University	Des Moines, IA	Active	
**GA Delta**	December 3, 2013	Morehouse College	Atlanta, GA	Active	
SC Alpha	2013–201x ?	University of South Carolina	Columbia, SC	Inactive	
**DC Beta**	December 7, 2013	American University	Washington, DC	Active	
**NY Xi**	March 8, 2014	SUNY Geneseo	Geneseo, NY	Active	
**PA Alpha**	February 8, 2014	University of Pittsburgh	Pittsburgh, PA	Active	
**FL Epsilon**	April 12, 2014	University of South Florida	Tampa, FL	Active	
IN Beta	2014–201x ?	DePauw University	Greencastle, IN	Inactive	
**PA Beta**	August 29, 2015	Temple University	Philadelphia, PA	Active	
**PA Gamma**	June 6, 2015	Drexel University	Philadelphia, PA	Active	
**MD Alpha**	November 7, 2015	University of Maryland, Baltimore County	Catonsville, MD	Active	
**CA Nu**	November 14, 2015	UC Santa Barbara	Santa Barbara, CA	Active	
**WA Alpha**	January 23, 2016	University of Washington	Seattle, WA	Active	
**IL Delta**	April 23, 2016	Loyola University Chicago	Chicago, IL	Active	
**MI Epsilon**	April 9, 2016	Central Michigan University	Mount Pleasant, MI	Active	
**MD Beta**	April 30, 2016	University of Maryland	College Park, MD	Active	
**VA Alpha**	October 29, 2017	University of Virginia	Charlottesville, VA	Active	
**PA Delta**	October 17, 2017	University of Pennsylvania	Philadelphia, PA	Active	
OR Alpha	2017–20xx ?	Portland State University	Portland, OR	Inactive	
**SC Beta**	April 22, 2018	Clemson University	Clemson, SC	Active	
**NC Alpha**	December 1, 2018	Duke University	Durham, NC	Active	
**FL Zeta**	December 7, 2018	Florida State University	Tallahassee, FL	Active	
**GA Epsilon**	April 27, 2019	University of Georgia	Athens, GA	Active	
**LA Alpha**	April 13, 2019	Tulane University	New Orleans, LA	Active	
**MA Beta**	September 13, 2020	Northeastern University	Boston, MA	Active	
**MO Beta**	March 7, 2020	University of Missouri	Columbia, MO	Active	
**NC Beta**	April 24, 2021	University of North Carolina at Chapel Hill	Chapel Hill, NC	Active	
**MI Zeta**	September 12, 2021	Michigan State University	East Lansing, MI	Active	
**OH Theta**	April 30, 2022	University of Cincinnati	Cincinnati, OH	Active	
**TN Alpha**	January 1, 2023	University of Tennessee	Knoxville, TN	Active	
**MO Gamma**	September 23, 2023	Washington University in St. Louis	St. Louis, MO	Active	
**MD Gamma**	August 30, 2024	Johns Hopkins University	Baltimore, MD	Active	
**TN Beta**	March 21, 2026	Vanderbilt University	Nashville, TN	Active	
