= Stan Jordan =

American politician

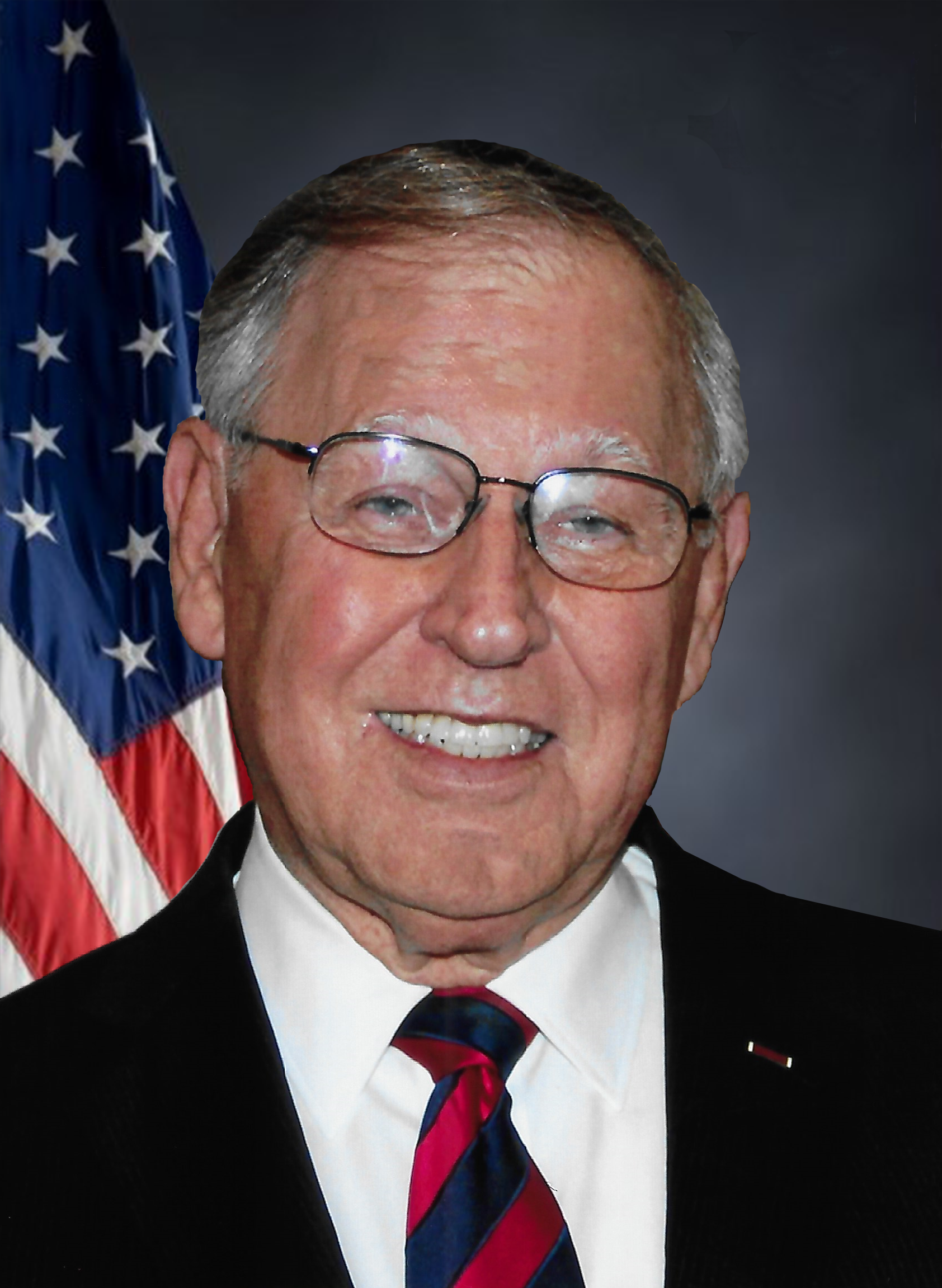

Chairman of Military Affairs of the Florida House of Representatives
- In office December 12, 2002 – November 4, 2008
- Succeeded by: Dorothy Hukill

Member of the Florida House of Representatives
- In office November 8, 2000 – November 3, 2008
- Preceded by: Jim Tullis
- Succeeded by: Lake Ray

Chairman of the Duval County School Board
- In office November 1, 1988 – November 1, 1991

Member of the Duval County School Board
- In office November 1, 1984 – November 1, 2000

Member of the Duval County School Board
- In office November 1, 2008 – November 1, 2009

Personal details
- Born: September 24, 1937 (age 88) Jacksonville, Florida
- Party: Republican
- Spouse(s): Shirley Hodges Jordan; Bonita Gorham Jordan
- Children: Rebecca Griffin; Joni Hancock
- Education: Jacksonville University (BS)(MA)

Stan Jordan (born September 24, 1937) is an American educator, military officer, businessman, and politician who served as a State Representative for the 17th District of the Florida House of Representatives from 2000 to 2008. He is a member of the Republican Party. Jordan had served on the Duval County School Board from 1984 to 2000, and served one last term as a school board member from 2008 to 2009.

== Education and early career ==
Reppard Stanley Jordan was born in Jacksonville, Florida and earned his BA at Jacksonville University in 1960 and his MA in 1967. He also attended the Command and General Staff College and the National Defense University.

Jordan began his career in education as a classroom teacher. He later became a principal, and finally, served as a board member of the Duval County School Board from 1984-88, as Chairman of the Board from 1989-98, and as a board member from 1991-2000 and, again for the 2008-2009 term."

== Military service ==
Jordan enlisted in the United States Army as a young man and worked to earn a commission as an officer. He was selected to attend Officer Candidate School (OCS) at Fort Benning, GA and commissioned as a Second Lieutenant (O1) on 22 May 1961 upon graduating from Officer Candidate School class NR 1-61.

In 2005, Jordan spearheaded the effort to pay tribute to World War Two veterans during the pre-game ceremonies of Super Bowl XXXIX in Jacksonville.

Most of Jordan's military service was in the reserves as he pursued his careers in education, business, and politics.

In Jordan retired as a colonel after 39 years of service in the Armed Forces. He was inducted into the Florida Veterans Hall of Fame in 2021.

== Business career ==
Jordan is the president and CEO of the Sterling Company of Florida, which makes truck bedliners and accessories, and is co-owner of the Beach Diner restaurant chain, with locations in Fernandina Beach, Atlantic Beach, Ponte Vedra, and Mandarin.

== Political career ==
Jordan first held elective office as a member of the Duval County School Board for 16 years, including 3 years as chairman.

In 2000, he was elected to the Florida House of Representatives from the 17th district. He was reelected three times, and, due to Florida's term limits, retired from the legislature when his fourth term ended on November 3, 2008.

== Personal life ==
Jordan married Shirley Hodges in 1960. After a long and mutually supportive marriage, she died in 2010. They had two daughters and four grandchildren. In 2018, he married Bonita Gorham.

Jordan has been a long-time member of the First Baptist Church of Jacksonville.
