= Kim Kendall =

American politician from Florida

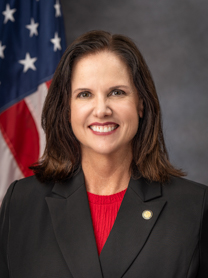

Member of the Florida House of Representatives from the 18th district
- Incumbent
- Assumed office November 5, 2024
- Preceded by: Cyndi Stevenson

Personal details
- Born: Arlington, Virginia, U.S.
- Party: Republican
- Education: Florida State University
- Occupation: Former Air Traffic Controller
- Website: votekimkendall.com

Kim Kendall is a Republican member of the Florida House of Representatives from the 18th district, which consists of part of St. Johns County.
