= Nova Southeastern College of Osteopathic Medicine =

Osteopathic medical school in Davie, Florida, US

Coordinates: 26.0779°N 80.2419°W

Nova Southeastern University Dr. Kiran C. Patel College of Osteopathic Medicine
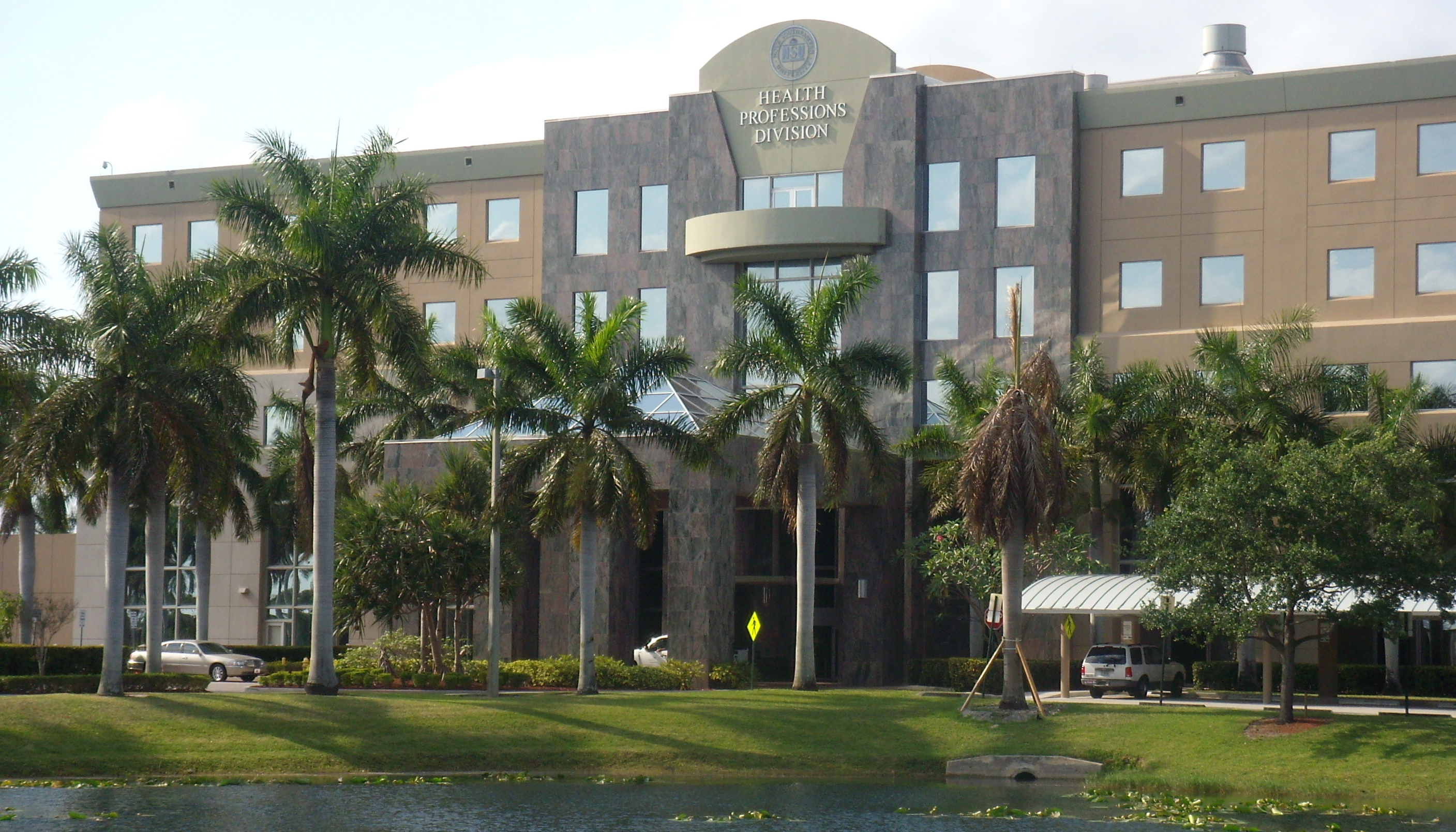
- Terry Building, home of the Dr. Kiran C. Patel College of Osteopathic Medicine administration
- Former name: Southeastern College of Osteopathic Medicine
- Type: Private medical school
- Established: 1981
- Parent institution: Nova Southeastern University
- Budget: $69.61 million
- Dean: Elaine M. Wallace
- Students: 1,154
- Location: Davie and Clearwater, Florida, U.S.
- Campus: Suburban 314 acres (1.27 km^{2})
- Website: medicine.nova.edu

Nova Southeastern University Dr. Kiran C. Patel College of Osteopathic Medicine (NSU-KPCOM) is a private medical school in Davie, Florida, United States. It is an academic division of Nova Southeastern University. The college was founded in 1981 as the only osteopathic medical school located in the Southeastern United States at the time. It confers the Doctor of Osteopathic Medicine degree and is accredited by the American Osteopathic Association's Commission on Osteopathic College Accreditation.

== History ==
Founded in 1981 in North Miami Beach, Florida, as the Southeastern College of Osteopathic Medicine (SECOM). In 1986, with the addition of the College of Pharmacy and the College of Optometry, the school became the "Southeastern University of Health Sciences." In 1994, Southeastern University merged with Nova University, creating Nova Southeastern University. In 1996, Nova Southeastern University's College of Osteopathic Medicine moved from North Miami Beach, Florida to Davie, Florida. In September 2017, NSU received a $200 Million Commitment from Patel Family Foundation and the College of Medicine was named the Dr. Kiran C. Patel College of Osteopathic Medicine.

In 2019, using an additional $50 million donated by the Patel Family, NSU opened a second DO program as part of the College of Osteopathic Medicine in Clearwater, FL. The campus started accepting new medical students in Fall 2019.

== Academics ==
The medical college offers a single medical degree (D.O.), the Doctor of Osteopathic Medicine, and several master's degrees and certificate programs, including a Master of Public Health and Master of Science degrees.

=== Societies ===
First-year medical students are placed into one of ten societies upon matriculation to the College of Osteopathic Medicine. At the white coat ceremony prior to the beginning of the first medical school year, students are officially inducted or "pinned" into their society. Each society is overseen by a faculty member, who serves as an advisor and mentor to students in their society during their medical school years. Each year, students compete in a variety of social and academic events to earn points for their society. At the end of each year, the society with the most overall points receives the College of Osteopathic Medicine Cup, or COM-Cup. The ten societies are named after physicians and educators that have been influential members of the medical community both as osteopathic medical physicians and leaders in the history of the medical school.

== Campus ==
The college provides education on a main campus in Davie, Florida and an additional campus in Clearwater, Florida.

== Notable alumni ==
- Tyler Cymet, D.O. ('88) - Professor of Internal Medicine at the Johns Hopkins School of Medicine, described a new genetic syndrome called Erondu–Cymet syndrome.
- Will Kirby, D.O., FAOCD ('00) - Clinical and Cosmetic Dermatologist; leading authority on laser tattoo removal; winner of CBS's Big Brother; has appeared on The Young and the Restless; and star of Dr. 90210.
- Ross Zafonte, D.O. ('85) - Physiatrist and Chairperson of the Department of Physical Medicine and Rehabilitation (PM&R) at Spaulding Rehabilitation Hospital, Harvard Medical School in Boston, Massachusetts.
- Ronald Renuart, D.O. ('90) - Republican politician who served as a member of the Florida House of Representatives.

== See also ==
- List of medical schools in the United States
- Dr. Kiran C. Patel College of Allopathic Medicine
