= Ross Zafonte =

American board-certified physiatrist

- Education: University of Georgia (BS); Nova Southeastern University College of Osteopathic Medicine (DO)
- Known for: Study of traumatic brain injury
- Scientific career
- Fields: Physiatry
- Workplaces: Spaulding Rehabilitation Hospital; Massachusetts General Hospital

Ross D. Zafonte is an American board-certified physiatrist known for his academic work in traumatic brain injury and is recognized as an expert in his field. His textbook, Brain Injury Medicine: Principles and Practice, is regarded as a standard in brain injury care. Zafonte has spoken at national and international conferences about traumatic brain injury, spasticity and other neurological disorders, and has authored more than 300 peer review journal articles, abstracts and book chapters. He serves on the editorial board of the Journal of Neurotrauma and NeuroEngineering and Rehabilitation.

== Early life and education ==
Zafonte says he always knew he wanted to help others recover, but realized the importance of medicine when his grandfather suffered a stroke. He attended undergraduate school at the University of Georgia and received his bachelor’s degree in psychology and biochemistry in 1981. He attended medical school at the Nova Southeastern University College of Osteopathic Medicine and received his Doctor of Osteopathic Medicine (D.O.) degree in 1985. After receiving his medical degree, Zafonte completed a one-year internship at Henry Ford Bi-County Hospital and then a physical medicine and rehabilitation residency at the Mount Sinai School of Medicine. He was board certified in physical medicine and rehabilitation in 1990.

== Career ==
Zafonte is the chairman of the Department of Physical Medicine and Rehabilitation (PM&R) at Spaulding Rehabilitation Hospital, Harvard Medical School in Boston, Massachusetts, and the chief of physical medicine & rehabilitation at Massachusetts General Hospital. He held the position of University of Pittsburgh Medical Center Vice President of rehabilitation services prior to his move to Harvard and has also served as a faculty member at Thomas Jefferson University, the University of Missouri, Wayne State University, and the University of Pittsburgh.

Zafonte researches the mechanisms of recovery after brain and spinal cord injury. His work is currently funded by the National Institutes of Health, United States Department of Defense and National Institute on Disability and Rehabilitation Research, and he is currently directing several large clinical treatment trials.

== Awards ==
- In 2006, Zafonte was selected by the American Academy of Physical Medicine and Rehabilitation to receive the Walter Zeiter award.
- In 2007, Zafonte received the Distinguished Academician award from the Association of Academic Physiatrists.
- In 2012, Zafonte received the William Caveness award for outstanding clinical care and research from the Brain Injury Association of America.
- In 2013, Zafonte received the Kessler Foundation's DeLisa Award for excellence in research and education in the field of physical medicine and rehabilitation.
- In 2014, Zafonte received the Moody Prize for brain injury research and care.
