= Jim Tullis =

American politician

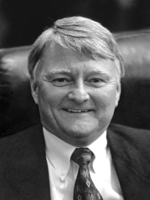

Member of the Florida House of Representatives from the 17th District
- In office March 9, 1999 – November 7, 2000
- Preceded by: Jim King
- Succeeded by: Stan Jordan

Member of the Jacksonville City Council from the 2nd District
- In office July 1, 1985 – March 9, 1999
- Preceded by: John E. Goode
- Succeeded by: Lynette Self

Personal details
- Born: November 3, 1941 Hackensack, New Jersey, U.S.
- Died: October 14, 2017 (aged 75) Jacksonville, Florida, U.S.
- Party: Republican (1995–2017); Democratic (before 1995)
- Children: James F. Jr., Kimberly K.
- Education: Jacksonville University (B.S.)
- Occupation: Insurance agent

James F. "Jim" Tullis (November 3, 1941 – October 14, 2017) was a Republican politician who served as a member of the Florida House of Representatives from 1999 to 2000 and as a member of the Jacksonville City Council from 1985 to 1999.

== Early life and career ==
Tullis was born in Hackensack, New Jersey, in 1941, and moved to Florida in 1945. He attended Jacksonville University, graduating with his bachelor's degree in business and economics in 1965.

== Jacksonville City Council ==
In 1985, following the resignation of Councilman John E. Goode, Tullis was elected to the Jacksonville City Council in a special election as a Democrat. He was re-elected in 1987 to a full term.

Tullis was challenged for re-election in the Democratic primary in 1991 by Dan Dixon, and narrowly won renomination, receiving 53 percent of the vote to Dixon's 47 percent. In the general election, he defeated Republican nominee David R. Goodman with 58 percent of the vote. Tullis ran for re-election as a Republican in 1995, and was again challenged by Dixon. He won re-election by a wide margin, winning 56 percent of the vote.

== Florida House of Representatives ==
In 1999, Governor Jeb Bush appointed Republican State Senator Bill Bankhead as the Secretary of the Florida Department of Juvenile Justice, and called a special election to fill Bankhead's seat. Republican State Representative Jim King ran in the special election to fill Bankhead's seat, and under Florida's resign-to-run law, had to resign his seat to do so, prompting a special election in the 17th District. Tullis ran in the special election, and was initially set to face fellow City Councilman John Crescimbeni as the Democratic nominee.

However, after qualifying, Crescimbeni withdrew from the race after an error was discovered on his campaign documents. Democrats sought to replace him on the ballot, but Republicans sued, arguing that Crescimbeni had never qualified. Circuit Court Judge Terry Lewis allowed Democrats to field a replacement candidate, and though they considered recruiting former State Representative Andy Johnson or City Councilman Eric Smith, the party ultimately declined to field a candidate. As a result, Tullis was elected to the State House unopposed.

In 2000, Tullis ran for re-election and was challenged by Republican Stan Jordan, a member of the Duval County School Board. Jordan and Tullis were the only candidates who filed, which opened up the race to all voters. Jordan narrowly defeated Tullis for re-election, winning 50.3 percent of the vote to Tullis's 49.7 percent, a margin of 159 votes.

Tullis ran against Jordan in 2002, and narrowly lost the Republican primary to him again. Jordan won 52 percent of the vote to Tullis's 48 percent.

== Death ==
Tullis died on October 14, 2017.
