= Tyler Cymet =

American physician

Tyler C. Cymet FACP
- Education: Emory University (BS); Nova Southeastern University College of Osteopathic Medicine (DO)
- Occupation: Physician
- Employer(s): Johns Hopkins University School of Medicine; University of Maryland; New York Institute of Technology College of Osteopathic Medicine

Tyler C. Cymet (born 1963 Smithtown, New York) is a physician in Baltimore, Maryland. He has done extensive research in musculoskeletal medicine focusing on fibromyalgia and the structure of the musculoskeletal system and how it affects function.

== Education ==
Cymet attended Emory University for his premedical undergraduate degree and majored in psychology and anthropology. He then attended Nova Southeastern University College of Osteopathic Medicine to acquire his D.O. degree. Then he served as an intern at Midwestern University Graduate Medical Education system, completed his internal medicine residency at Yale University, and did additional training at Sinai Hospital of Baltimore.

== Research and publications ==
Cymet has done extensive research in musculoskeletal medicine focusing on fibromyalgia, and the structure of the musculoskeletal system and how it affects function. He proposed an explanation for the articular crack (knuckle, neck and other joint sounds) that has caused debate in the medical community. Cymet's research has shown a potential protective joint effect from joint cracking.

He is the author of the Ad Diction Ary, a guide to the slang of the drug subculture written for the medical community to help physicians better comprehend drug addicted patients.

Cymet has written medical articles on issues of public interest in medicine including why people develop gray hair, and the cause and nature of hiccups. Other areas that Cymet has researched include: positive and negative effects of exercise, the role of probiotics in medicine, carbohydrates, and obesity.

In 2006 he discovered a new syndrome called Erondu–Cymet syndrome.

== Medical career ==
As of 2006, Cymet is an assistant professor at the Johns Hopkins University School of Medicine and former President of the Baltimore City Medical Society and Maryland Association of Osteopathic Physicians. In 2014, he became the President of The Maryland State Medical Society. Cymet has also taught at the Kirksville College of Osteopathic Medicine, Kansas City University of Medicine and Biosciences, and the New York Institute of Technology College of Osteopathic Medicine.

He is notable in the medical community for his treatment of anthrax victims during the 2001 anthrax attacks in the Baltimore-Washington Metropolitan Area of the United States. This led to many policy changes in how victims of disasters are triaged and treated.

He has also volunteered for humanitarian missions to Guatemala and Haiti with DOCARE. In 2006 he ran for Maryland Democratic State Central Committee in the 11th legislative district. He was the Legislative Director for Health Care Policy for Delegate Dan K. Morhaim in the Maryland Legislature from 2006 to 2016. He is the current Chief of Clinical Education at the American Association of Colleges of Osteopathic Medicine.

Cymet also is in the board of directors at the American College of Healthcare Trustees. He is a consultant emergency physician at the University of Maryland, Department of Emergency Medicine.

== See also ==
- Erondu–Cymet syndrome
