= Florida's 18th House of Representatives district =

American legislative district

Florida's 18th State House of Representatives district
Representative
Kim Kendall; R–St. Augustine

Florida's 18th House District elects one member of the Florida House of Representatives. It has been represented by Kim Kendall since 2024.

The district covers part of St. Johns County.
