= Erondu–Cymet syndrome =

Genetic disorder

Erondu–Cymet syndrome is a syndrome caused by a translocation on the 21st chromosome. The genetic karyotype for people with this condition is 46, XY, inv(21)(q11.2q22.1). Findings in these patients include hypotension, hypoxemia, seizures, and impairment of cognitive ability. Patients with this condition may have persistent left superior vena cava that drains into the left atrium, as well as pulmonary arteriovenous malformations. Erondu–Cymet syndrome was discovered in 2006 by Ugochi Erondu and Tyler Cymet.

== See also ==
- Trisomy 21
