= Lake Ray =

American politician

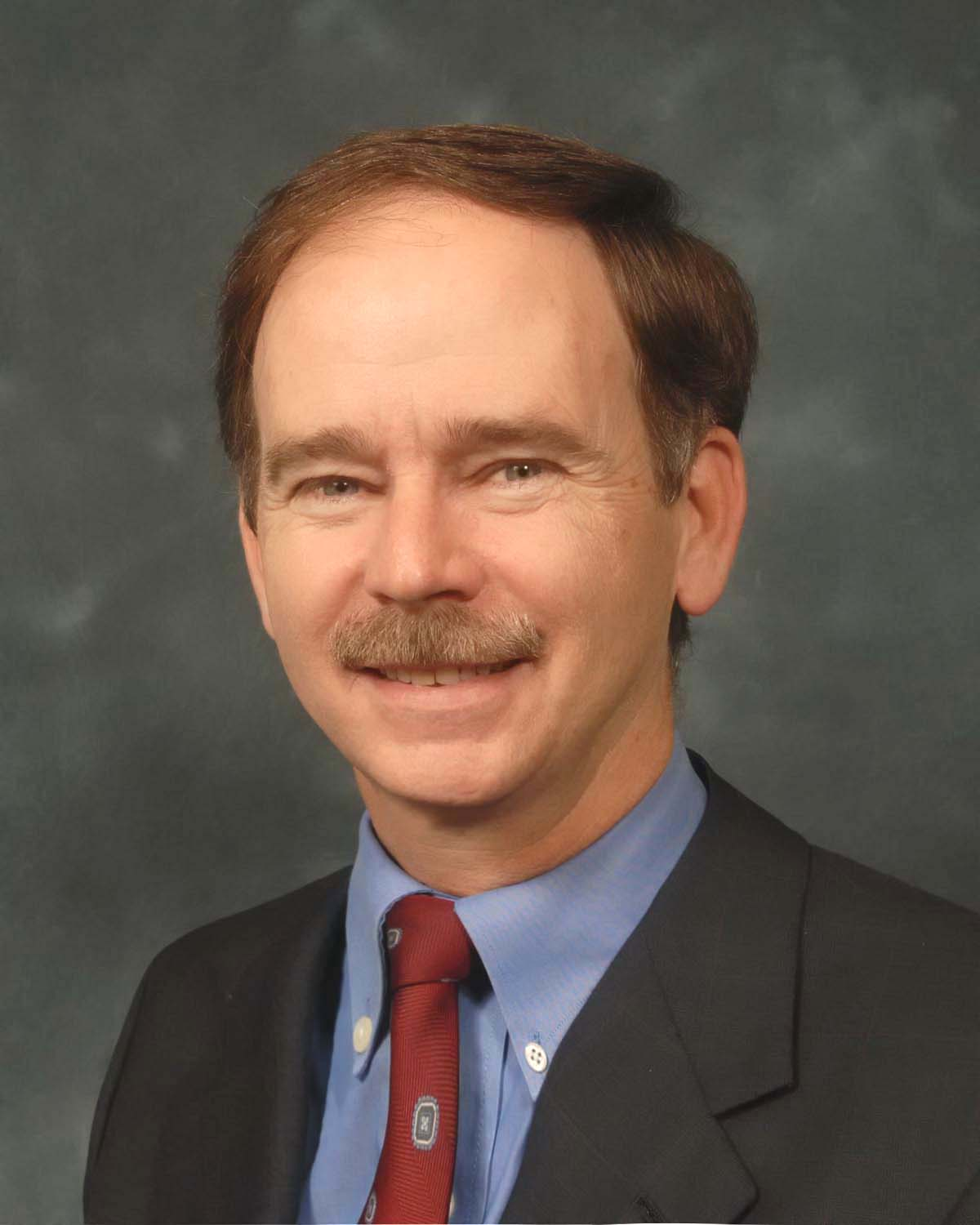

Member of the Florida House of Representatives
- In office November 18, 2008 – November 8, 2016
- Preceded by: Stan Jordan
- Succeeded by: Clay Yarborough
- Constituency: 17th district (2008–2012); 12th district (2012–2016)

Personal details
- Born: October 4, 1956 (age 70) Jacksonville, Florida
- Party: Republican
- Spouse: Brenda
- Children: Lake IV, Forrest, Hampton
- Education: St. Johns River State College (A.A.); University of Florida (B.S.)
- Profession: Engineer

Lake Ray (born October 4, 1956) is a former Republican member of the Florida House of Representatives, representing the 12th District, which includes parts of downtown Jacksonville in Duval County, from 2012 to 2016, and previously representing the 17th District from 2008 to 2012.

== Early life and education ==
Ray was born in Jacksonville, and was an Eagle Scout in the Boy Scouts of America while in high school. He graduated from St. Johns River State College with an associate degree in 1976. He graduated from the University of Florida with a Bachelor of Science degree in civil engineering in 1981 and was a member of Delta Upsilon.

== Career ==
Following his college graduation, Ray worked as an engineer, eventually becoming President of the First Coast Manufacturers Association. He was elected to the Jacksonville City Council and served from 1999 to 2007.

== Florida House of Representatives ==
When incumbent State Representative Stan Jordan was unable to seek re-election in 2008, Adkins ran to succeed him in District 17, which included northeastern Duval County. He faced Mario Rubio and Gordon Morgan in the Republican primary, easily defeating both of them with 52% of the vote. In the general election, Ray faced Regina Young, the Democratic nominee and a minister. The Florida Times-Union endorsed Ray, praising him for his "solid experience in public affairs and...good track record for responding to his constituents." He was able to defeat Young easily, winning with 64% of the vote, and was re-elected without opposition in 2010.

When districts were reconfigured in 2012, Ray was drawn into the 12th District, which included much of the territory that he had represented in the 17th District. He won his party's nomination unopposed and encountered Green Party nominee Karen Morian, a humanities professor, his only opposition in the general election. Ray emphasized his experience in Tallahassee and pledged to work to "bring jobs to JaxPort and broaden the economic opportunities around the region and state." He ended up defeating Morian in a landslide, winning 68% of the vote to Morian's 32%.

== Political positions ==
=== Donald Trump ===
On May 4, 2016, Ray endorsed Donald Trump, stating: "It is very obvious as to where we are and that the voices of the people have been heard. As an individual, and even in my elected office, yes I am fully ready to embrace the candidacy of Donald Trump."
