= University of Florida College of Medicine-Jacksonville =

Medical school of the University of Florida in Jacksonville

College of Medicine – Jacksonville
- Former name: Jacksonville Health Education Program (JHEP)
- Type: Medical school
- Established: 1985
- Parent institution: Health Science Center–Jacksonville
- Affiliations: University of Florida
- Dean: Linda R. Edwards, M.D.
- Academic staff: 2,004
- Location: Jacksonville, Florida, United States
- Website: med.jax.ufl.edu

The University of Florida College of Medicine – Jacksonville is the largest of the three University of Florida Health Science Center Jacksonville colleges — medicine, nursing and pharmacy. The college's 16 clinical science departments house more than 440 faculty members and 380 residents and fellows. The college offers 34 accredited graduate medical education programs and 10 non-standard programs.

The campus continues to develop and expand, as evidenced by the Breast Center, Cardiovascular Center, Neuroscience Institute, the Women's Health Center and the UF Proton Therapy Institute's proton beam cancer treatment facility.

The UFCOM-J academic roots stem not only from medical education and patient care, but also from faculty-driven clinical research. The faculty physicians participate in advanced clinical trials to provide patients the latest in diagnostic, treatment, and rehabilitative services. The campus houses a state-of-the-art 16,000-square-foot (1,500 m^{2}) research facility.

== History ==
The UF College of Medicine – Jacksonville is located in Duval County, within the city of Jacksonville, Florida. The origins of the Health Science Center date back to 1870 with the opening of Florida's first non-military hospital, known then as Duval Hospital and Asylum, located on Jefferson St.

=== Timeline ===
Sources:

- In 1901, George A. Brewster Hospital and School of Nursing opened to care for victims of the great fire of Jacksonville.
- The Duval County Welfare Board took control of the Duval Hospital and Asylum in 1922.
- By 1925 the first residency program in the state opened at the Duval Hospital and Asylum. The following year the hospital was renamed the Duval County Hospital.
- The first cancer program in Florida was developed at the Duval County Hospital in 1948. Later that same year, the hospital was renamed the Duval Medical Center.
- By 1958 the UF Teaching Hospital opened in Gainesville as a state institution and the first UF clinic, UF Outpatient Clinic, opened on the campus; seven years later, the name of the teaching hospital was modified, and became Shands Teaching Hospital and Clinics.
- In 1966, the Brewster Hospital and School of Nursing closed, but re-opened the following year as the not-for-profit Methodist Hospital.
- A benchmark in medical education in Jacksonville occurred in 1969 with the formation of the Jacksonville Health Education Program, Inc. (JHEP). This was the first medical extension division of the UF College of Medicine.
- In 1971, the Duval Medical Center was renamed the University Hospital of Jacksonville.
- An affiliation between the Outpatient VA Clinic in Jacksonville and the Jacksonville Health Education Program, Inc. (JEHP) was established in 1972.
- The Jacksonville Faculty Plan was created under the auspice of the University Hospital Academic Fund, Inc. in 1978.
- In 1983, the hospital opened the first Level I trauma center in Florida.
- In 1985, the University of Florida Health Science Center Jacksonville was established.
- In 1988, the Health Science Center was designated a major affiliate and urban campus of the UF Health Science Center. All physician faculty based in Jacksonville became UF faculty.
- In 1989, the hospital was renamed University Medical Center (UMC) and JHEP was managed by the UF Health Science Center.
- The Jacksonville Faculty Practice Association, Inc. was renamed the University of Florida Jacksonville Physicians, Inc. (UFJPI) in 1996 and the University of Florida Health Science Center Jacksonville Satellite Clinics, Inc. was renamed University of Florida Jacksonville Healthcare, Inc. (UFJHI).
- The UF Southside Specialty Care Center, the first UF community-based multi-specialty practice opened in Jacksonville in 1996.
- As an affiliate of the University of Florida Health Science Center and Shands HealthCare, University Medical Center and Methodist Medical Center merged in 1999 to become Shands Jacksonville Medical Center. Shands Jacksonville serves as the UF College of Medicine-Jacksonville's major hospital affiliation.
- In 2013, Shands Jacksonville was renamed UF Health Jacksonville.

Consistent with its role in medical education for the university, the Jacksonville campus was formally designated as a regional campus of the University of Florida College of Medicine in 2004 with the appointment of the first dean of the regional campus, Robert C. Nuss, M.D.

== Affiliations ==
The UF College of Medicine - Jacksonville is closely affiliated with UF Health Jacksonville, a comprehensive care academic medical center and the metropolitan teaching hospital for UFCOM-J. The hospital's major centers include the Breast Center, Cardiovascular Center, Neuroscience Institute and the Women's Health Center.

UF Health Jacksonville is home to the only Level I adult and pediatric trauma center in Northeast Florida, as well as one of only two hospitals in the area to have a Level III neonatal intensive care unit and a separate pediatric emergency department. In addition, UF's proton beam cancer treatment facility was the first of its kind in the Southeastern US and fifth in the nation. The UF Health Proton Therapy Institute is located on the hospital's campus.

In addition to UF Health Jacksonville, UF College of Medicine - Jacksonville faculty physicians provide patient care at seven other major medical centers and more than 36 primary and specialty satellite practices across North Florida and South Georgia.

== Patient care ==
The UF College of Medicine - Jacksonville provides a combination of patient care and medical education. The hospital serves as the clinical base to educate medical students, residents and fellows under the supervision of faculty in all of the major medical and surgical specialties, with more than 380 faculty physicians and over 300 residents and fellows. It also provides a training site for those studying for careers in nursing, pharmacy, medical technology, podiatry and other health fields.

The faculty practice plan was originally established as a separate 501(c)(3) non-profit corporation and is now the University of Florida Jacksonville Physicians, Inc. (UFJPI). UFJPI provides practice management support, billing and collection for 380 physicians with academic University of Florida appointments.

== Research ==
The UF Health Science Center Jacksonville received $23.1 million in external support for research in fiscal year 2019 and had more than 376 ongoing externally funded studies. Over the past five years, external research funding at UFHSCJ has increased more than 128 percent. Federal-sponsored studies account for 50 percent of the UFCOM-J research awards.

UF Center for HIV/AIDS Research, Education and Service (UF CARES) is the largest recipient of extramural federal funding at the UF College of Medicine - Jacksonville. It is an NIH-funded center for HIV research and the largest center for HIV patient care in North Florida.

The UF College of Medicine - Jacksonville is an active participant in the Clinical and Translational Science Award (CTSA) granted to the University of Florida by the National Institutes of Health. A 16,000-square-foot (1,500 m^{2}) research facility was opened in 2007 on the Jacksonville campus. The opening of the research laboratory facility resulted in an increase of research scientists joining faculty by 150 percent.

The college's Dean's Office offers two internal grant competitions annually, one for Jacksonville faculty, and the other for Jacksonville residents and fellows. In 2012, the Dean's Office awarded more than $100,000 in internal research funding.

The UF College of Medicine - Jacksonville offers on-campus biostatistical consulting and research support services to faculty, residents, fellows and other researchers. Also as a service to faculty members, staff and employees of the Health Science Center Jacksonville, the Institutional Review Board (IRB) provides guidance and assistance in preparing proposed projects that involve human subjects in research.

== Education ==
=== Graduate Medical Education ===
The University of Florida College of Medicine - Jacksonville is home of the first residency program in the state of Florida: the surgery residency program began in 1925 at what was then called the Duval Hospital.

Today the college attracts students from all regions of the United States to train in Accreditation Council for Graduate Medical Education (ACGME)-accredited residencies and fellowships, in addition to two Commission on Dental Accreditation (CODA)-accredited fellowships.

Residencies: Anesthesiology, Diagnostic Radiology, Emergency Medicine, Internal Medicine, Interventional Radiology (Independent and Integrated), Oral and Maxillofacial Surgery, Neurology, Obstetrics and Gynecology, Orthopaedic Surgery, Pathology, Pediatrics, Psychiatry, Surgery

Fellowships: Cardiology, Clinical Cardiac Electrophysiology, Child Abuse Pediatrics, Cytopathology, Endocrinology, Gastroenterology, Head and Neck Oncologic/Microvascular Surgery, Hospice and Palliative Medicine, Infectious Disease, Interventional Cardiology, Medical Oncology, Nephrology, Pediatric Emergency Medicine, Pediatric Endocrinology, Pediatric Hematology-Oncology, Pediatric Infectious Diseases, Pulmonary Disease and Critical Care Medicine, Surgical Critical Care Medicine, Transfusion Medicine, Vascular Neurology

Non-standard fellowship programs offered include: Breast Imaging and Intervention, Breast Pathology, Community and Societal Pediatrics, Minimally Invasive Surgery, Musculoskeletal Imaging, Obstetrical Anesthesiology, Patient Safety, Pediatric Maxillofacial and Craniofacial Surgery, and Regional Anesthesiology and Acute Pain Management.

The majority of the graduates of UF College of Medicine - Jacksonville residency and fellowship programs remain in Florida to practice.

=== Continuing Medical Education ===
As part of the educational mission, the college supports lifelong learning experiences for physicians through the provision of seminars, workshops, review courses, symposia, conferences, meetings, lecture series and grand rounds. Continuing Medical Education (CME) is designed to share the latest in medical knowledge and to teach new skills, both technical and patient-relationship skills, while further developing existing skills.

UF College of Medicine - Jacksonville also supports continued faculty development through a series of conferences designed to enhance faculty instructional and evaluative skills as well as monitor and develop instructional programs.

=== Medical Student Education ===
Clinical rotations in all the major disciplines are provided for students from the UF College of Medicine in Gainesville. Third-year medical students enrolled at UF spend about 25 percent of their training at the Jacksonville campus, gaining experience in an urban setting. While third-year rotations are only offered to UF students, elective rotations in the fourth year are available to students from accredited schools in the US and Canada. The UF College Of Medicine - Jacksonville also provides education during the clinical year to fourth year medical students at a medical school which is accredited by the COCA or LCME and which is a member, or an affiliated member, of the Association of American Medical Colleges. Students from non LCME or COCA accredited institutions may also be eligible for rotations at the University of Florida College of Medicine – Jacksonville. In addition, clinical rotations are available to students attending the UF School of Physician Assistant Studies program.

=== Simulation Education ===
The UF Center for Simulation Education and Safety Research (CSEaSR), one of the nation's largest non-military simulation training centers, provides comprehensive training of multiple competencies, simultaneously and repetitively, and is rapidly becoming a vital component of medical education. It allows the gap to be bridged between classroom and "real-life" experience, challenging the trainee to make critical decisions and then witness the results of those decisions in a controlled, observed and patient-safe environment with faculty and peer feedback. CSESaR is located in a facility spanning approximately 24,000 square feet (2,200 m^{2}) and is divided into three areas in the Pavilion building on the UF Health Jacksonville campus: 7,800-square-foot (720 m^{2}) main simulation and conference/instruction area; 15,900-square-foot (1,480 m^{2}) operating room simulation and instruction area, and an area for disaster simulation. The central mission of CSESaR, a collaborative effort supported by UF Health Jacksonville and the UF College of Medicine - Jacksonville, is to promote quality patient care, expand patient safety initiatives and enhance multidisciplinary health care, education and teamwork through simulation and goal-directed training.

=== Library Services ===
Borland Health Sciences Library, a branch of the UF Health Science Center Libraries, one of the libraries in the UF George A. Smathers Library System with its extensive resources, supports the educational, research and clinical information needs of UFHSC Jacksonville. The Borland Library's collection includes more than 36,000 volumes, including more than 300 current journal subscriptions and 4,000 current monographs complemented by ready access to the UF Health Science Center Libraries.

== See also ==
- UF Health Jacksonville
