= 2010 Florida Attorney General election =

- November 2, 2010
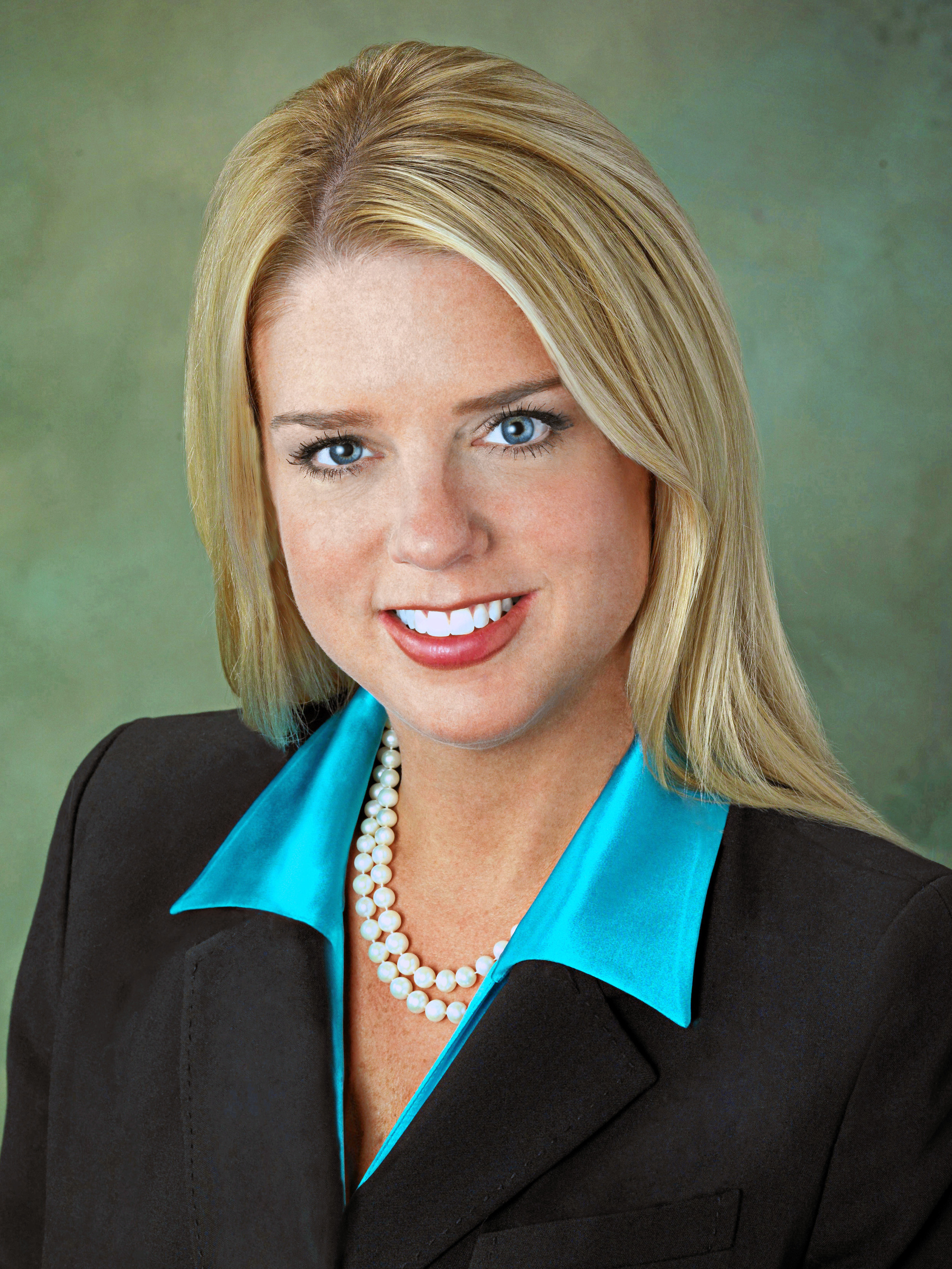

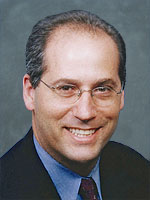
Nominee	Pam Bondi	Dan Gelber
Party	Republican	Democratic
Popular vote	2,882,868	2,181,377
Percentage	54.77%	41.44%
- Bondi: 40–50% 50–60% 60–70% 70–80% 80–90% >90% Gelber: 40–50% 50–60% 60–70% 70–80% 80–90% >90% Tie: 40–50% 50% No votes
Attorney General before election
Bill McCollum
Republican
Elected Attorney General
Pam Bondi
Republican

The 2010 Florida Attorney General election took place on November 2, 2010, to elect the Florida Attorney General. Incumbent Attorney General Bill McCollum opted to run for run for Governor rather than seek reelection. The election was won by Republican Pam Bondi, a former assistant state attorney for Hillsborough County, who defeated Democrat Dan Gelber by a 54.8% to 41.1% margin. Bondi took office in January 2011. Bondi would later be appointed U.S. attorney general from 2025 to 2026.

== Republican primary ==
=== Candidates ===
- Holly Benson, former state representative
- Pam Bondi, former assistant state attorney for Hillsborough County
- Jeff Kottkamp, Lieutenant Governor of Florida

=== Campaign ===
With Governor Charlie Crist opting to run for the United States Senate in 2010 rather than seek re-election, Lieutenant Governor Jeff Kottkamp ran for attorney general. He was joined in the Republican primary by former state representative and Crist administration official Holly Benson and assistant state attorney Pam Bondi.

Though all three candidates were relatively unknown, Kottkamp had the greatest name recognition following his successful statewide campaign in 2006, and raised the most money. Kottkamp campaigned on his endorsements from law enforcement, his support for cracking down on pill mills, cybercrime, and Medicaid fraud, and his opposition to illegal immigration. He was criticized, however, for his use of state planes and vehicles to travel on vacations and to music concerts.

Benson, meanwhile, campaigned on her fiscal conservatism, pledging to create a "regulatory strike force" and to "focus legal efforts on cutting government regulation of businesses and unnecessary paperwork." She emphasized her experience running the state Department of Business and Professional Regulation and the state Agency for Health Care Administration. The Orlando Sentinel, though praising her "stronger management experience," called her priorities "misplaced," and observed that "reducing regulations on business and limiting lawsuits" were more appropriate goals for a governor or state legislator.

Bondi criticized Benson's remarks during a radio interview, where she said "[J]ust because you're poor doesn't mean you have to be unhealthy. It means you have a lot more time to go running."

Finally, Bondi emphasized her conservative credentials and her opposition to the Obama administration. She noted that she would have refused to accept stimulus money from the federal government, took a position against the restoration of felons' voter rights, and pledged to challenge the Affordable Care Act in court.

=== Endorsements ===
Holly Benson

U.S. Representatives

- Newt Gingrich, former U.S. Representative (GA-06), former Speaker of the United States House of Representatives
- Jeff Miller, U.S. Representative (FL-01)

Statewide officials

- Sandra Mortham, former Secretary of State of Florida

State legislators

- Don Brown, former State Representative (R-DeFuniak Springs)
- Greg Evers, State Representative (R-Baker)
- Don Gaetz, State Senator (R-Niceville)
- Matt Gaetz, State Representative (R-Niceville)
- Andy Gardiner, State Senator (R-Orlando)
- Mike Horner, State Representative (R-Kissimmee)
- Carlos Lacasa, former State Representative (R-Miami)
- Jerry Maygarden, former State Representative (R-Pensacola)
- Dave Murzin, State Representative (R-Pensacola)
- Joe Negron, State Senator (R-Stuart)
- Peter Nehr, State Representative (R-Palm Harbor)
- Scott Plakon, State Representative (R-Longwood)

Mayors and other municipal leaders

- Mike Anderson, Mayor of Fort Walton Beach
- Adam Barringer, Mayor of New Smyrna Beach
- James Campbell, Okaloosa County Commissioner
- Bob Cole, Santa Rosa County Commissioner
- Travis Cummings, Clay County Commission Chairman
- David Ellspermann, Marion County Clerk of Courts
- Bill Furst, Sarasota County Property Appraiser
- Lydia Gardner, Orange County Clerk of Courts
- Ed Gray III, Santa Rosa County School Board member
- Pat Hollarn, former Okaloosa County Supervisor of Elections
- Lane Lynchard, Santa Rosa County Commissioner
- Bill Roberts, Okaloosa County Commissioner
- Wilson Robertson, Escambia County Commissioner
- Alexis Tibbetts, Okaloosa County Superintendent of Schools
- Mike Wiggins, Mayor of Pensacola
- Gordon Goodin, Santa Rosa County Commission Chairman

Newspapers

- Naples Daily News
- Pensacola News Journal
- Sarasota Herald-Tribune
- Marco Eagle
- Pensacola Independent News
- Palatka Daily News
Pam Bondi

Statewide officials

- Bob Martinez, former Governor of Florida
- James C. Smith, former Secretary of State of Florida, former Attorney General of Florida

State legislators

- Larry Cretul, State Representative (R-Ocala), Speaker of the Florida House of Representatives

Other individuals

- Sarah Palin, former Governor of Alaska, Republican nominee for Vice-President in 2008

Organizations

- Associated Builders and Contractors of Florida
- Associated Industries of Florida
- Florida Chamber of Commerce
- Susan B. Anthony List

Newspapers

- Miami Herald
- Orlando Sentinel
- St. Petersburg Times
- Tampa Tribune
Jeff Kottkamp

U.S. Senators

- Connie Mack III, former U.S. Senator from Florida

U.S. Representatives

- Vern Buchanan, U.S. Representative (FL-13)
- Lincoln Díaz-Balart, U.S. Representative (FL-21)
- Mario Díaz-Balart, U.S. Representative (FL-25)
- Connie Mack IV, U.S. Representative (FL-14)
- Bill Posey, U.S. Representative (FL-15)

State legislators

- Sandy Adams, State Representative (R-Oviedo)
- Janet Adkins, State Representative (R-Fernadina Beach)
- Thad Altman, State Senator (R-Melbourne)
- Kevin Ambler, State Representative (R-Tampa)
- Gary Aubuchon, State Representative (R-Cape Coral)
- Carey Baker, State Senator (R-Eustis)
- Dennis Baxley, former State Representative (R-Ocala)
- Mike Bennett, State Senator (R-Bradenton)
- Marti Coley, State Representative (R-Marianna)
- Lee Constantine, State Senator (R-Altamonte Springs)
- Steve Crisafulli, State Representative (R-Merritt Island)
- Victor Crist, State Senator (R-Tampa)
- Charles Dean, State Senator (R-Inverness)
- Chris Dorworth, State Representative (R-Heathrow)
- Mike Fasano, State Senator (R-New Port Richey)
- Clay Ford, State Representative (R-Pensacola)
- Bill Galvano, State Representative (R-Bradenton)
- Eddy González, State Representative (R-Miami)
- Tom Grady, State Representative (R-Naples)
- Alan Hays, State Representative (R-Umatilla)
- Ed Homan, State Representative (R-Temple Terrace)
- Dorothy Hukill, State Representative (R-Port Orange)
- Dennis Jones, State Senator (R-Seminole)
- Kurt Kelly, State Representative (R-Ocala)
- Paige Kreegel, State Representative (R-Punta Gorda)
- Marcelo Llorente, State Representative (R-Miami)
- Bryan Nelson, State Representative (R-Apopka)
- Steve Oelrich, State Senator (R-Ocala)
- Pat Patterson (R-Deland)
- Durell Peaden, State Senator (R-Crestview)
- Juan-Carlos Planas, State Representative (R-Miami)
- Ralph Poppell, State Representative (R-Vero Beach)
- Steve Precourt, State Representative (R-Winter Garden)
- Ron Reagan, State Representative (R-Sarasota)
- Julio Robaina, State Representative (R-Miami)
- Ken Roberson, State Representative (R-Port Charlotte)
- Will Snyder, State Representative (R-Stuart)
- John Tobia, State Representative (R-Melbourne)
- Trudi Williams, State Representative (R-Fort Myers)
- Stephen Wise, State Senator (R-Jacksonville)
- John Wood, State Representative (R-Haines City)
- Ritch Workman, State Representative (R-Melbourne)
- Charles Van Zant, State Representative (R-Palatka)
- Juan C. Zapata, State Representative (R-Miami)

Mayors and other municipal leaders

- Mike Adkinson, Walton County Sheriff
- Gary Borders, Lake County Sheriff
- Tim Brown, Holmes County Sheriff
- Bill Cameron, Charlotte County Sheriff
- Don Eslinger, Seminole County Sheriff
- Bill Farmer, Jr., Sumter County Sheriff
- Donald Fleming, Flagler County Sheriff
- Wendell Hall, Santa Rosa County Sheriff
- Ben Johnson, Volusia County Sheriff
- Al Lamberti, Broward County Sheriff
- Deryl Loar, Indian River County Sheriff
- Arnold Lanier, Hardee County Sheriff
- Joe A. Martinez, Miami-Dade County Commissioner
- Rich Nugent, Hernando County Sheriff
- Jack Parker, Brevard County Sheriff
- Kevin Rambosk, Collier County Sheriff
- John Rutherford, Duval County Sheriff
- Mike Scott, Lee County Sheriff
- Tom Seagraves, Nassau County Sheriff
- David Shoar, St. Johns County Sheriff
- Brad Steube, Manatee County Sheriff
- Bob White, Pasco County Sheriff

Other individuals

- Phyllis Schlafly, conservative activist
- John Stemberger, President of the Florida Family Policy Council

Organizations

- Florida Right-to-Life
- Florida State Fraternal order of Police
- Florida Police Benevolent Association

=== Results ===
Republican primary results
Party	Candidate	Votes	%
Republican	Pam Bondi	459,022	37.89
Republican	Jeff Kottkamp	397,781	32.84
Republican	Holly Benson	354,573	29.27
Total votes		1,211,376	100.00

== Democratic primary ==
=== Candidates ===
- Dave Aronberg, state senator
- Dan Gelber, state senator

=== Endorsements ===
Dave Aronberg

U.S. Representatives

- Ted Deutch, U.S. Representative (FL-19)
- Ron Klein, U.S. Representative (FL-22)

State legislators

- Scott Randolph, State Representative (D-Orlando)

Mayors and other municipal leaders

- B. Hugh Bradley, Hardee County Clerk of Courts
- Ric Bradshaw, Palm Beach County Sheriff
- P. Dewitt Cason, Columbia County Clerk of Courts
- Linda Cook, Washington County Clerk of Courts
- Pat Frank, Hillsborough County Clerk of Courts
- Sadie Darnell, Alachua County Sheriff
- Jeffrey J. Dawsy, Citrus County Sheriff
- Joey Dobson, Baker County Sheriff
- Joseph Gilliam, Gilchrist County Clerk of Courts
- Dale Guthrie, Jackson County Clerk of Courts
- David Harvey, Wakulla County Sheriff
- Bob Inzer, Leon County Clerk of Courts
- Buddy Irby, Alachua County Clerk of Courts
- Ken Keechl, Vice-Mayor of Broward County
- Ken Mascara, St. Lucie County Sheriff
- Annie Mae Murphy, Taylor County Clerk of Courts
- Regina Parrish, Union County Clerk of Courts
- J. Harrell Reid, Hamilton County Sheriff
- Lou Roberts, Jackson County Sheriff
- Tim Sanders, Madison County Clerk of Courts
- Lloyd A. "Skip" Shiver, Franklin County Clerk of Courts
- Gordon Smith, Bradford County Sheriff
- Joseph Smith, St. Lucie County Clerk of Courts
- Tim Smith, Putnam County Clerk of Courts
- David L. Tatum, Calhoun County Clerk of Courts
- Brent Thurmond, Wakulla County Clerk of Courts
- Richard Weiss, Polk County Clerk of Courts
- Steve Whidden, Hendry County Sheriff
- Stuart Whiddon, Glades County Sheriff
- Morris Young, Gadsden County Sheriff

Organizations

- Florida Police Benevolent Association
- International Union of Painters and Allied Trades
- Florida State Fraternal order of Police
Dan Gelber

U.S. Cabinet Members and Cabinet-level officials

- Janet Reno, 78th United States Attorney General

U.S. Representatives

- Jim Davis, former U.S. Representative (FL-11), Democratic nominee for Governor in 2006
- Debbie Wasserman Schultz, U.S. Representative (FL-20)

Statewide officials

- Betty Castor, former Florida Commissioner of Education, former President of the University of South Florida, Democratic nominee for U.S. Senate in 2004
- Buddy MacKay, former Governor of Florida

State legislators

- Joe Gibbons, State Representative (D-Hallandale Beach)
- Audrey Gibson, State Representative (D-Jacksonville)
- Bill Heller, State Representative (D-St. Petersburg)
- Evan Jenne, State Representative (D-Dania Beach)
- Mia Jones, State Representative (D-Jacksonville)
- Arthenia Joyner, State Senator (D-Tampa)
- Janet Long, State Representative (D-Seminole)
- Matthew Meadows, former State Representative (D-Fort Lauderdale)
- Betty Reed, State Representative (D-Tampa)
- Nan Rich, State Senator (D-Weston)
- Darryl Rouson, State Representative (D-St. Petersburg)
- Michael Scionti, State Representative (D-Tampa)
- Perry Thurston, State Representative (D-Fort Lauderdale)
- Jim Waldman, State Representative (D-Coconut Creek)
- Doug Wiles, State Representative (D-St. Augustine)

Mayors and other municipal leaders

- Joe Boles, Mayor of St. Augustine
- Joy Cooper, Mayor of Hallandale Beach
- Debby Eisinger, Mayor of Cooper City
- Anne Gannon, Palm Beach County Tax Collector
- Jennifer Gottlieb, Broward County School Board Vice-Chair
- Kristin Jacobs, Broward County Commissioner
- Glorious Johnson, Jacksonville City Councilwoman
- Pam Iorio, Mayor of Tampa
- Eddy Gonzalez, former Tampa Police chief
- Lori Cohen Moseley, Mayor of Miramar
- Frank Ortis, Mayor of Pembroke Pines
- Eileen Roy, Alachua County School Board member
- Katherine Fernandez Rundle, 11th Judicical Circuit State Attorney
- Jack Seiler, Mayor of Fort Lauderdale
- Dennis Ward, 16th Judicial Circuit State Attorney
- Roger Wishner, Mayor of Sunrise

Organizations

- American Federation of State, County and Municipal Employees
- Broward Teachers Union
- Equality Florida
- International Brotherhood of Teamsters
- United Transportation Union
- International Union of Operating Engineers
- Service Employees International Union
- South Florida Council of Firefighters
- United Teachers of Dade
- Volusia Teachers Union

Newspapers

- Orlando Sentinel
- St. Petersburg Times

=== Results ===
Democratic primary results
Party	Candidate	Votes	%
Democratic	Dan Gelber	491,834	59.14
Democratic	Dave Aronberg	339,856	40.86
Total votes		831,690	100.00

== General election ==
=== Results ===
Florida Attorney General election, 2010
Party	Candidate	Votes	%	±%
Republican	Pam Bondi	2,882,868	54.77%	+2.08%
Democratic	Dan Gelber	2,181,377	41.44%	−5.86%
Independent	Jim Lewis	199,147	3.78%	
Majority		701,491	13.33%	+7.95%
Turnout		5,263,392		
Republican hold		Swing		
