= List of mayors of Pensacola, Florida =

This is a list of mayors of Pensacola, Florida. The mayor is the chief executive of the Pensacola city government. This list is from 1820 through present day, and includes Spanish, Confederate and United States mayors.

In 1878, Salvador T. Pons, the first African–American mayor of Pensacola, was elected.

In 1885, the city's charter was revoked by governor Edward A. Perry, replacing it with a state-appointed government. In 1895, a new city charter was passed by the Florida Legislature, replacing Perry's Provisional Municipality of Pensacola with a new charter, which stated that Pensacolians could elect their own mayor and aldermen.

In 1931, the city government was changed to a council–manager government, which it had until 2009, when voters approved a new mayor–council charter.

== List ==
#	Mayor	Start	End	Party
1	José Noriega (1788-1827) alcade	June 1820	July 1821	
-	Henry M. Brackenridge (1786-1871) acting	July 1821	August 1821	none
2	George Bowie (1772-1864)	August 1821	October 1821	
3	John Miller (1768-1826)	October 1821	1822	
4	Juan de la Rua (1789-1832)	1822	1823	
5	Peter Alba (1762-1833); 1st term	1823	1825	
6	John Jerrison (1776-1850); 1st term	1825	1828	
7	Benjamin D. Wright (1799-1874); 1st term	1828	1829	
(6)	John Jerrison (1776-1850); 2nd term	1829	1830	
(5)	Peter Alba (1762-1833); 2nd term	1830	1834	
8	Charles Evans (1801-1856); 1st term	1834	1838	
9	Hanson Kelly (1774-1855)	1838	1840	
10	Charles LeBaron (1804-1881)	1840	1841	
(7)	Benjamin D. Wright (1799-1874); 2nd term	1841	1842	Whig
(8)	Charles Evans (1801-1856); 2nd term	1842	1847	
11	F.E. de la Rua (1815-1891)	1847	1848	
(8)	Charles Evans (1801-1856); 2nd term	1848	1852	
12	Joseph Sierra (1802-1867); 1st term	1852	1854	
13	Samuel A. Leonard (1831-1866); 1st term	1854	July 1854	
-	H.F. Ingraham (1813-1887) acting	July 1854	1854	
(12)	Joseph Sierra (1802-1867); 2nd term	1854	1855	
14	Francis B. Bobe (1829-1881); 1st term	1855	1859	
15	Celestino Gonzalez (d. 1865)	1859	1861	
16	C. H. Gingles (1811-1881)	1861	1862	
(14)	Francis B. Bobe(1829-1881); 2nd term	1862	1866	
(13)	Samuel A. Leonard (1831-1866); 2nd term	1866	1866	
17	E. W. Anderson	1867	1868	
18	Sewell C. Cobb (1828-1902)	1868	1870	Republican
19	Frederick C. Humphreys (1822-1899)	1870	1873	
20	Royal Putnam	1873	1874	
21	R. A. Stearns 1st term	1874	1875	
22	J. P. Jones (1833-1895)	1875	1877	
(21)	R. A. Stearns 2nd term	1877	1878	
23	Salvador Pons (1835-1890)	1878	1879	
24	William M. Oerting (1820-1897)	1879	1881	
25	George H. O'Neal (1822-1887)	1881	1882	
26	J. M. Tarble (d. 1906)	1882	1883	Republican
27	George H. Welles	1883	1885	
28	S. S. Harvey (1836-1913)	1885	1886	
29	A. L. Avery (1817-1901); 1st term	1886	1887	
28	W. D. Chipley	1887	1888	
27	A. L. Avery	1888 – 1890		
29	J. M. Hilliard	1890 – 1893		
30	W. E. Anderson	1893 – 1895		
31	Pat McHugh	1895		
30	W. E. Anderson	1895 – 1897		
32	W. H. Northrup	1897 – 1899		
29	J. M. Hilliard	1899 – 1901		
33	C. M. Jones	1901 – 1903		
34	T. E. Welles	1903 – 1905		
35	Charles H. Bliss	1905 – 1907		
36	C. C. Goodman	1907 – 1909		
37	Frank Reilly	1909 – 1913		
38	A. Greenhut	1913 – 1916		
39	G. Heinrich	1916 – 1917		
40	Thomas H. Johnson	1917 – 1918		
41	S. M. Maguire	1918 – 1919		
42	F. D. Sanders	1919 – 1921		
43	J. H. Bayliss	1921 – 1931		
44	H. Clay Armstrong	1931 – 1936		
45	W. L. Moyer	1936		
46	Max L. Bear	1936 – 1937		
47	L. C. Hagler	1937 – 1943		
48	Walter E. Wicke	1943 – 1947		
49	C. P. Mason	1947 – 1957		
50	Roy S. Philpot	1957 – 1961		
51	Charles H. Overman Jr.	1961–1963		
50	C. P. Mason	1963 – 1965		
51	B. I. Greenhut	1965 – 1967		
52	Reinhardt Holm	1967		
53	Charles Soule	1967 – 1969		
54	Bryant Liggett	1969 – 1971		
55	Eugene P. Elebash	1971 – 1973		
56	Barney B. Burkes	1973 – 1977		
57	Warren M. Briggs	1977 – 1978		
58	Vince Whibbs	1978 – 1991		
59	Jerry Maygarden	1991 – 1994		
60	John Fogg	1994 – 2009		
61	Mike Wiggins	2009 – 2011		
62	Ashton Hayward III	2011 – 2018		
63	Grover Robinson IV	2018 – 2022		
64	D. C. Reeves	2022 –		

== See also ==
- Mayor of Pensacola
- History of Pensacola, Florida
- Timeline of Pensacola, Florida
