= Port of Pensacola =

- Interactive map of Port of Pensacola
- Location in USA

Location
- Country: United States
- Location: Downtown, Pensacola, Florida, United States
- Coordinates: 30°26′N 87°12′W
- UN/LOCODE: USPNS

Details
- Opened: 1743
- Size: 50 acres
- No. of berths: 7
- Draft depth: 33 ft.
- Port Director: Lance Scott

Statistics
- Website www.portofpensacola.com

The Port of Pensacola is an operational deep-water port on Pensacola Bay. Dating back to 1743, it is now one of the City of Pensacola's Enterprise Operations, having been incorporated in 1943 as the Municipal Port Authority.

The present-day Port of Pensacola occupies approximately 50 acres of landfill at the southern terminus of Barracks Street in downtown Pensacola, on the site of the former Commendencia Street and Tarragona Street wharves. The Port has eight 33' deep draft berths, 265,000 square feet of warehouse space, and on-dock rail service.

The Port of Pensacola is on the Gulf of Mexico, only 11 miles from the first sea buoy, with no overhead obstructions: one of the quickest transits in Gulf of Mexico. The port is directly served by CSX, a Class I railroad, and indirectly by Interstate Highway 10 and the Pensacola International Airport.

The Port of Pensacola, strategically positioned along the Gulf of Mexico, is Northwest Florida’s most diverse and business focused deep-water port. Pensacola is a full service port, offering stevedoring and marine terminal services for all descriptions of bulk, break-bulk, unitized freight, and special project cargo.

== History ==
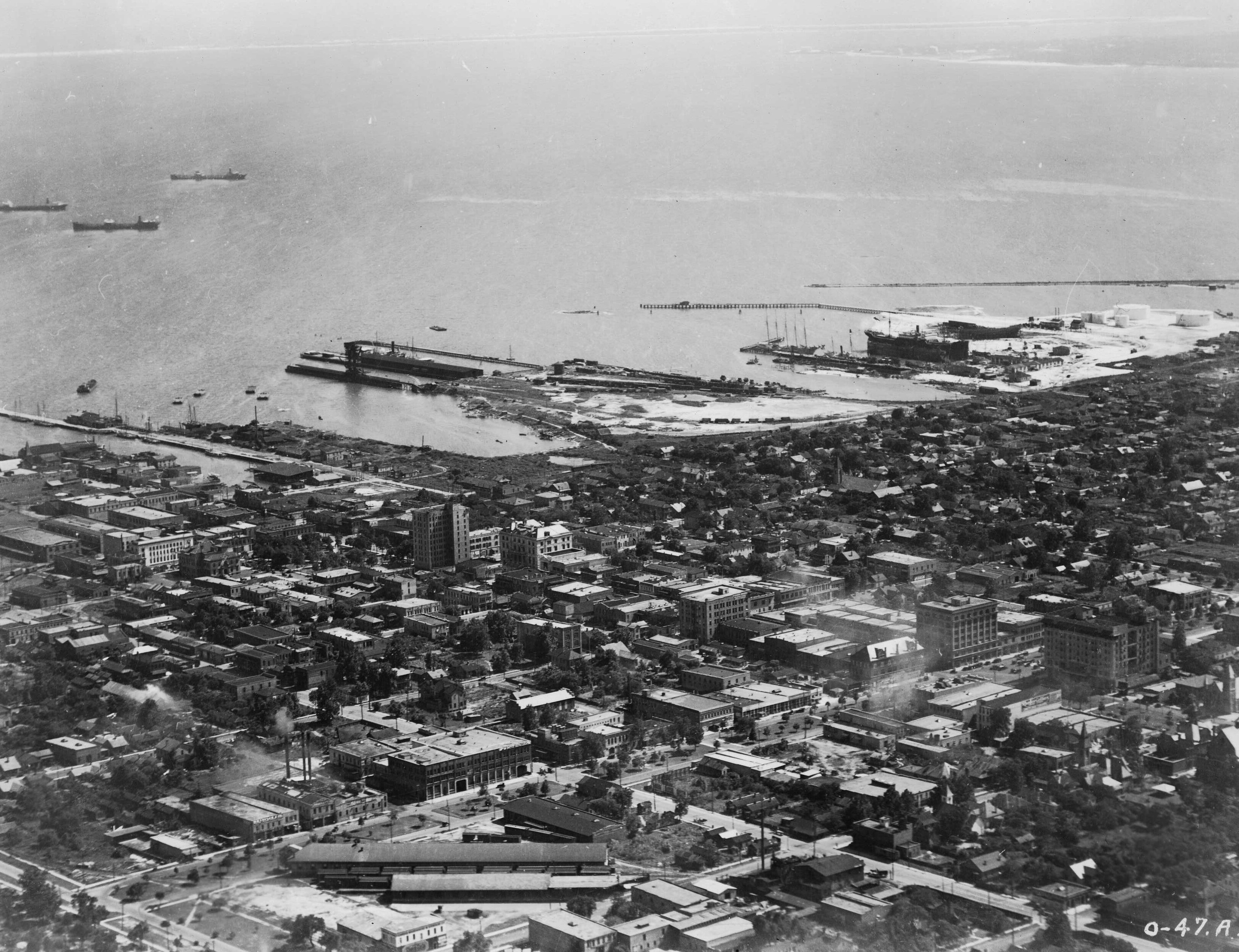
General View, 1922

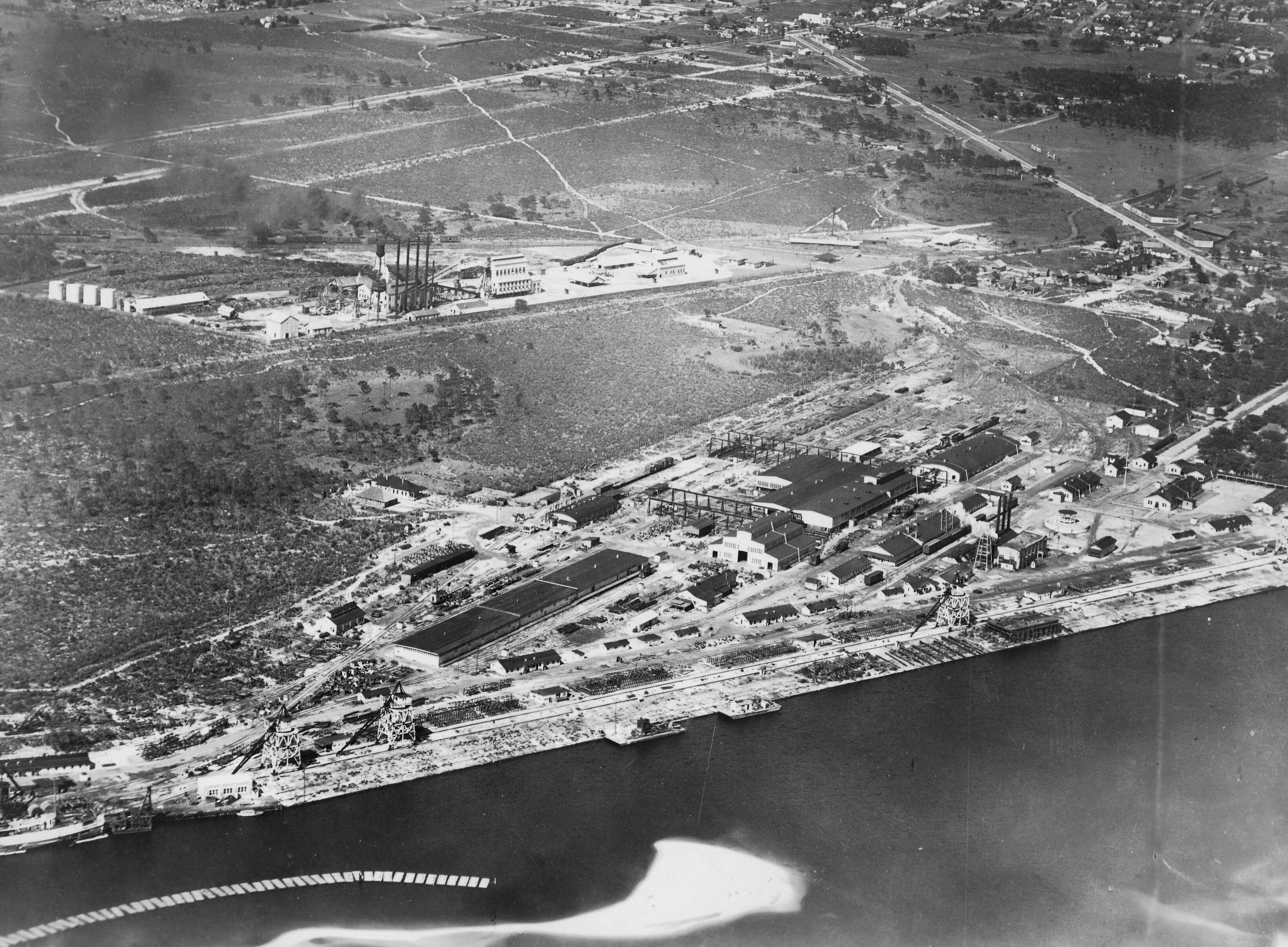
US Shipping Board Yards, 1922

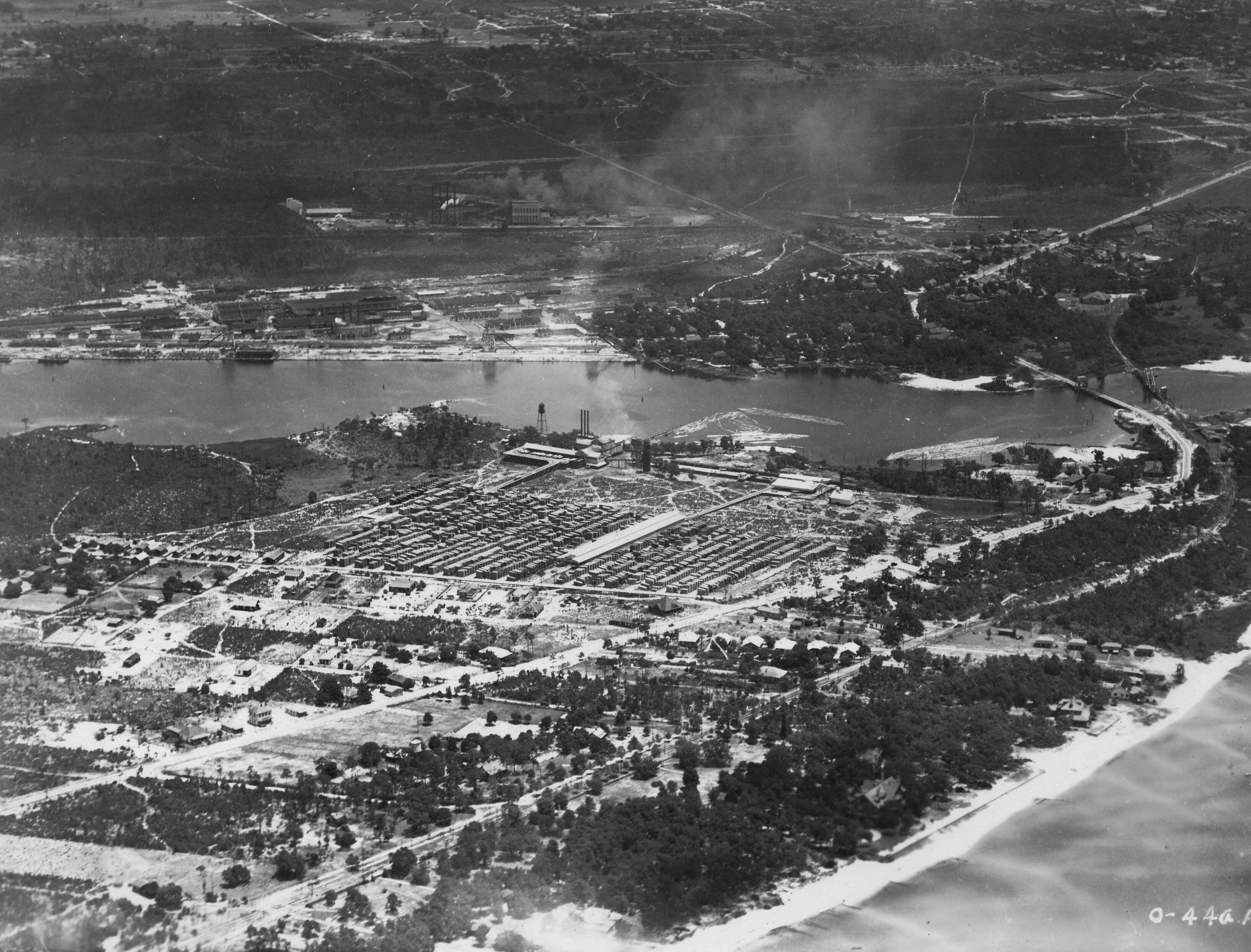
Concrete plant, 1922

The first recorded export of commercial cargo from Pensacola, a shipment of pine and pitch products, took place in 1743. Pensacola's first private commercial dock was built in 1784.

This 1940 aerial view of Pensacola's waterfront illustrates how Pensacola's port facilities looked in the first half of the 20th century, with Commendencia Street, Tarragona Street and Muscogee wharves intact. In the early 1940s, the Pensacola Exchange Club hosted a forum called the "Civic Roundtable," where representatives from Rotary, Lions Club, Kiwanis, the Chamber, the Jaycees and others would meet to discuss business issues, among them the port, which was enjoying a wartime resurgence. The group pressed State Representative Dave Thomas to introduce a bill in the Florida legislature creating the Municipal Port Authority in the spring term of 1943. Its members were initially appointed by state senator and included J. D. Johnson, Henry Hilton-Green, Calvin L. Todd, William S. Rosasco, W. V. Fauria, Morris Levy, J. H. McCormack, J. W. Smith, Jr., Charles W. Smith, J. H. Allen and R. H. Turner, Jr. (Later members would be appointed by the Pensacola City Council, which also approved annual funding to the Port Authority, as it had no taxing authority of its own.) The group first convened on July 7, 1943 in Council's chambers.

In November 2018, the Port of Pensacola became the winter base for The New York Yacht Club American Magic, the United States Challenger in the 36th America’s Cup.

The New York Yacht Club American Magic, the United States Challenger in the 37th America's Cup, announced in June 2022 that it had returned to the Port of Pensacola to train.

== Improvements ==
In 2012 Mayor Ashton Hayward announced that the city will be given more than US$3.61 million to the Port of Pensacola for improvement.
