= Lois Benson =

American politician

Member of the Florida House of Representatives from the 2nd district
- In office November 3, 1992 – November 8, 1994
- Preceded by: Buzz Ritchie
- Succeeded by: Jerry Maygarden

Member of the Pensacola City Council from the 1st district
- In office 1988–1990

Personal details
- Born: Delaware, U.S.
- Spouse: Scott Benson
- Children: 2, including Holly Benson

Lois Holden Benson is an American politician who represented the 2nd District in the Florida House of Representatives from 1992 to 1994 as well as various city government roles and state appointments.

== Pensacola City Council ==
Benson previously served on Pensacola City Council as the representative for District 1, from 1988 to 1990; she resigned to seek state office. She also previously served in the 2nd district of Escambia County.

== Florida House of Representatives ==
She also served in Florida House of Representatives 2nd from November 3, 1992 – November 8, 1994.

== Emerald Coast Utilities Authority ==
Benson was initially appointed to the ECUA seat by Governor Jeb Bush on November 23, 2004, following the October 31 resignation of George Watson. She currently serves on the Emerald Coast Utilities Authority board member for Escambia County District 2.

== Bid for US House/Florida State Senate/Mayor Of Pensacola ==
She has also run for the Florida State Senate, the U.S. House of Representatives, and the Mayor of Pensacola, the latter of which she lost in 2001 to John Fogg. A priority of her campaign platform at the time was to relocate the Main Street Wastewater Treatment Plant.

In her 1994 bid to replace retiring Congressman Earl Hutto, she faced four other Republicans in the primary and received a plurality (31.4%) of votes. In the resulting runoff, however, her pro-choice views contributed to her defeat (46%-54%) by pro-life newcomer Joe Scarborough, who went on to defeat Democrat Vince Whibbs Jr. in the general election.

== Personal life ==
Lois Holden Benson is the mother of Holly Benson and Megan Benson Pratt. Both her daughters have worked in government, with one of them, Holly Benson, serving in Florida's 3rd house district and the other Megan Benson Pratt has served as Pensacola City Council from at large district.
