= Vincent J. Whibbs Sr. =

American politician

Vince Whibbs Sr.
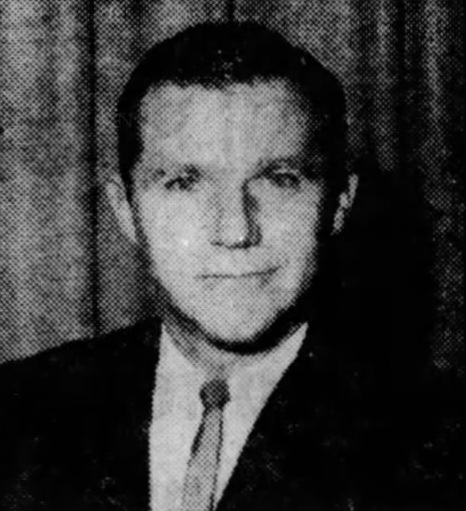
- Official portrait, 1964

54th Mayor of Pensacola
- In office 1977–1991
- Preceded by: Warren M. Briggs
- Succeeded by: Jerry Maygarden

Member of the Pensacola City Council from Ward 1, Group 2
- In office 1963–1965

Personal details
- Born: Vincent John Whibbs; February 8, 1920 Buffalo, New York
- Died: May 20, 2006 (aged 86)
- Spouse: Anna Marie Stuart Whibbs
- Children: 7
- Profession: Automobile dealer, politician, businessmen

Military service
- Allegiance: United States
- Branch/service: United States Army
- Years of service: 1940 - 1946
- Rank: Captain
- Battles/wars: World War II

Vincent John Whibbs Sr. KSG (February 8, 1920 – May 30, 2006) was an American automobile dealer, politician and businessman who served as the 54th mayor of Pensacola from 1978 to 1991. Whibbs was also very involved with many projects and groups in his hometown of Pensacola, Florida. He was invested as a knight of the Order of St. Gregory the Great by Pope John Paul II in 1995.

== Personal life ==
Vincent John Whibbs was born on February 8, 1920, in Buffalo, New York. Whibbs had a wife, Anna, and 7 children. He died on May 26, 2006, at the age of 86.

== Career ==
=== Business career ===
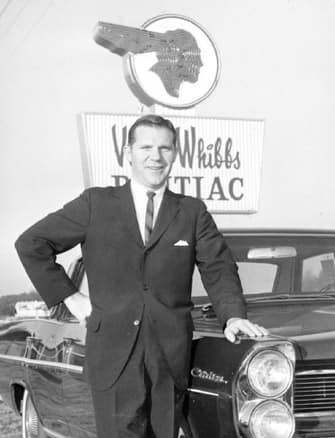
Whibbs portrait in front of Vince Whibbs Pontiac Dealership

Whibbs worked for the Pontiac division of General Motors beginning in 1940. He held positions in Buffalo, New York, Charlotte, North Carolina, Jacksonville, Florida, and Pensacola, Florida. During World War II, he served in the U.S. Army Air Corps. In 1958, Whibbs founded Vince Whibbs Pontiac, now known as Buick GMC Pensacola.

=== Political career ===
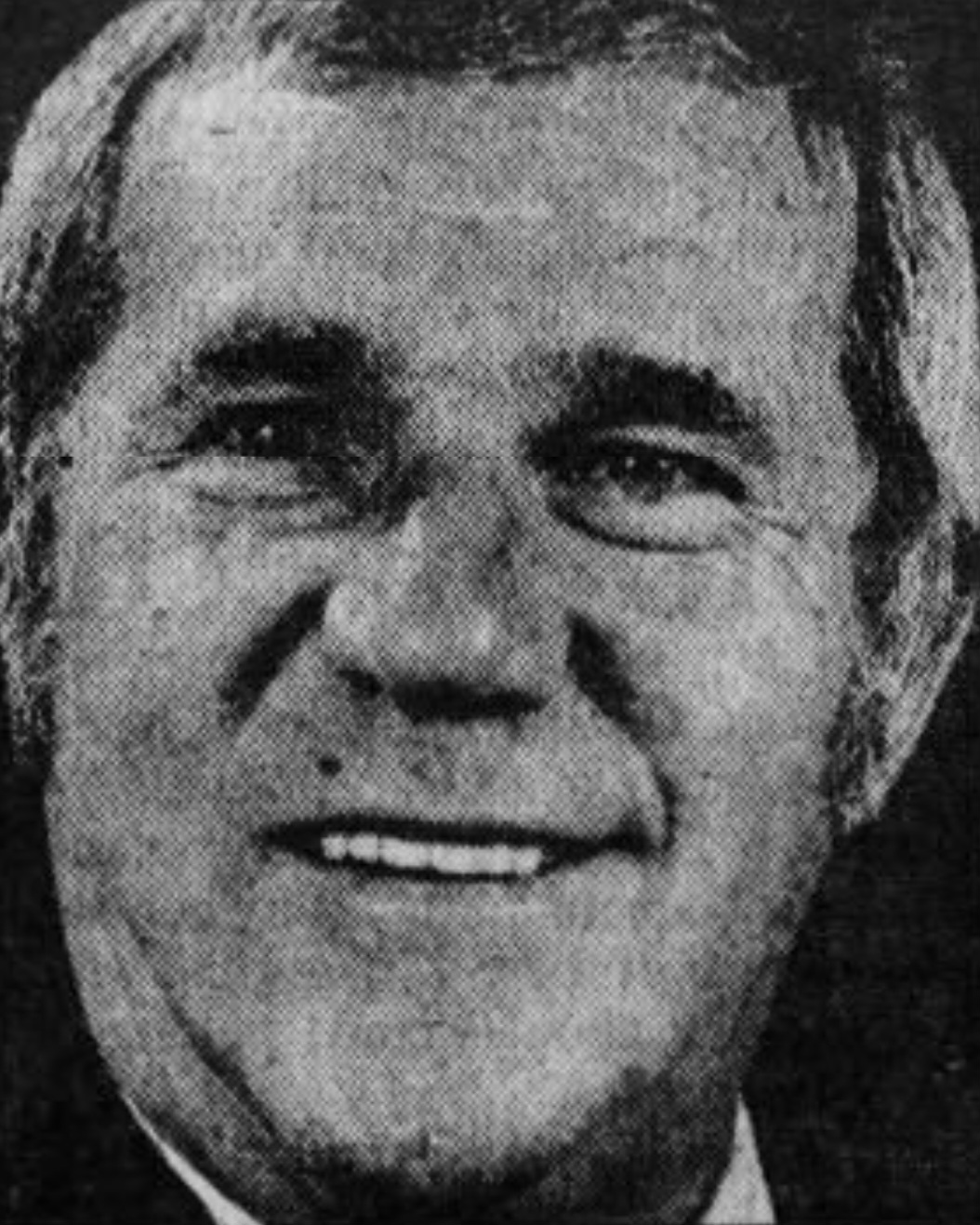
Whibbs in 1985

Whibbs served on the board of directors of the Greater Pensacola Area Chamber of Commerce. Vince also served as president of the Pensacola Chapter of the Navy League, Rotary Club of Pensacola Suburban West, the Fiesta of Five Flags, Junior Achievement, Pensacola Franchised Automobile Dealers Association and the United Way and Project Alert. Whibbs was elected to serve on the Pensacola City Council from Ward 1, Group 2 in 1963, and served as a councilman until 1965. In 1975, Whibbs was selected to be head of the Pensacola Chamber of Commerce, and was then elected to serve as the 54th mayor of Pensacola from 1978 until his retirement in 1991. He was succeeded by Mayor pro Tempore Jerry Maygarden.

== Legacy ==
The Vince J. Whibbs Sr. Community Maritime Park, opened in 2012, is named in his honor.

There is a statue of Whibbs at the Vince J. Whibbs Sr. Community Maritime Park.

== See also ==
- List of mayors of Pensacola, Florida
- Pensacola City Hall

| Preceded by Warren M. Briggs | Mayor of Pensacola, Florida; 1978 - 1991 | Succeeded by Jerry Maygarden |
