= Seal of Pensacola, Florida =

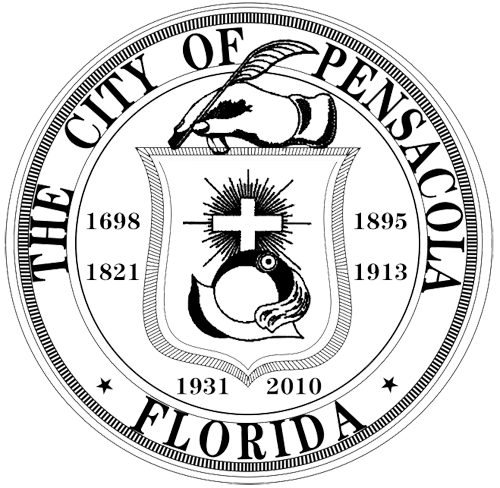
- Armiger: D. C. Reeves, Mayor of Pensacola
- Adopted: 1902
- Crest: Christian cross and conquistador's helmet
- Shield: A circle around a shield with a Latin-type cross in the upper central part of the shield, at the base of which shall be a helmet with plumes, and above the shield a hand with a pen in the act of signing, and on the left side of the shield the figures "1698," "1821," "1895" and "1913," and beneath the shield the figures "1931."

The seal of Pensacola is used to represent the Pensacola municipal government and for various official purposes. The current seal has been in use since 1870 and was officially adopted by ordinance in 1902, with slight modifications since.

== History and symbolism ==
At the center of the seal is a shield (escutcheon) charged with a Christian cross and conquistador's helmet, a modified version of the cross and crown that represents the religious mission of Don Tristán de Luna y Arellano. Above the escutcheon is a hand (symbolizing faith, sincerity and justice) holding a quill pen (symbolizing learned employment and the liberal arts). Five dates printed on the seal represent years when city governments were established or altered.

The wording of the municipal code prescribes the seal as follows:

The seal of the city shall have on its face, "The City of Pensacola, Florida," with a circle around a shield with a Latin-type cross in the upper central part of the shield, at the base of which shall be a helmet with plumes, and above the shield a hand with a pen in the act of signing, and on the left side of the shield the figures "1698," the year of the first settlement of Pensacola by the Spaniards, and "1821," the year of the first city government under General Andrew Jackson, United States Army, and on the right side of the shield the figures "1895" and "1913," the dates respectively of the formation of the aldermanic and commission governments, and beneath the shield the figures "1931," the date of the institution of the council-manager government.

The seal design that is currently used has been in use since 1870, and in 1902 the seal was adopted by ordinance to be the official seal of Pensacola.

For many years the first date listed on the seal was 1696, until local historians W. D. Skinner and Norm Simmons questioned the date, noting that 1698 was the year when Andrés de Arriola established a Spanish colony on Pensacola Bay.

== Controversy ==
In 1997, attorney Kevin Beck urged the city to remove the cross from the seal, citing constitutional concerns, and threatened to take legal action on behalf of an anonymous client. "My position would be the presence of the cross on an official city seal is tantamount to the endorsement of Christianity."

== See also ==
- History of Pensacola, Florida
- Mayor of Pensacola
- Pensacola City Council
