= Jerry Maygarden =

American politician

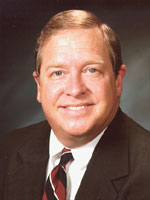

Member of the Florida House of Representatives from the 2nd district
- In office November 8, 1994 – November 5, 2002
- Preceded by: Lois Benson
- Succeeded by: Dave Murzin

59th Mayor of Pensacola
- In office June 10, 1991 – July 28, 1994
- Preceded by: Vince Whibbs
- Succeeded by: John Fogg

Personal details
- Born: December 22, 1948 (age 77) Pensacola, Florida, U.S.
- Party: Republican
- Education: Pensacola Junior College (AA); University of West Florida (BA, MA)

Military service
- Allegiance: United States
- Branch/service: United States Navy
- Battles/wars: Vietnam War

Jerry Louis Maygarden (born December 22, 1948) is a former American politician who served as a member of the Florida House of Representatives from 1994 to 2002. A member of the Republican Party, he previously served as the 55th Mayor of Pensacola from 1991 to 1994.

== Politics ==
Maygarden was a member of the Pensacola City Council from 1985 to 1992, and was Mayor Pro Tempore of Pensacola from 1989 to 1991. Maygarden was Mayor Pro Tempor at the time of Vince Whibbs' retirement from the office, causing him to become Mayor. Maygarden also served as a member of the Florida House of Representatives 1994 to 2002.

He got a lot of some notoriety during the Florida election recount imbroglio by stating during a rally in Pensacola: "We've come together to express our collective concerns over the manner in which our votes are being systematically devalued in favor of dangling chads, pregnant chads and dimpled chads. Well, they can kiss my chad."

After his tenure in elected office, Maygarden re-entered the private sphere, working as a health care industry executive and spokesperson. He advocated publicly against comprehensive healthcare reform at the federal level.

== Biography ==
=== Education ===
Maygarden received an AA in liberal arts from Pensacola Junior College in 1972, a BA in Communication Arts in 1974 and an MA in the same cum laude in 1975 from the University of West Florida in 1974.

=== Employment ===
He served in the United States Navy and served with the Navy Riverine Forces in the Mekong Delta during the Vietnam War.

== See also ==
- Pensacola, Florida
- Pensacola City Council
- Mayor of Pensacola
- List of mayors of Pensacola, Florida

Political offices
Preceded by Vince Whibbs	Mayor of Pensacola, Florida; 1991-1994	Succeeded by John Fogg
Florida House of Representatives
Preceded by Lois Benson	Member of the Florida House of Representatives from the 2nd district 1995-2002	Succeeded by Dave Murzin
