= Mike Wiggins =

American politician and businessman (born 1945)

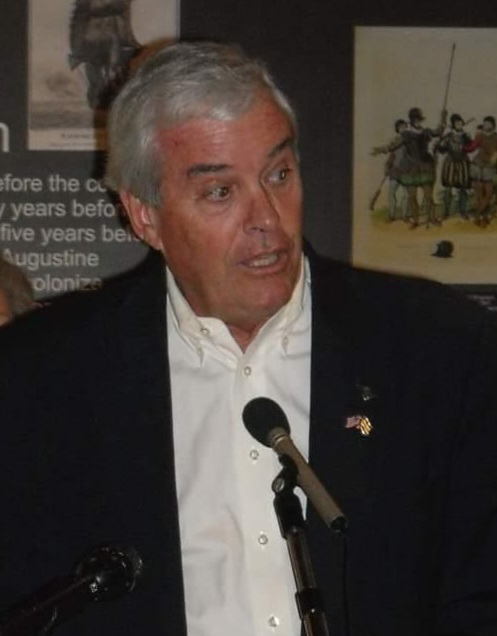
- Wiggins in 2009

61st Mayor of Pensacola
- In office January 12, 2009 – January 11, 2011
- Preceded by: John Fogg
- Succeeded by: Ashton Hayward

Member of the Pensacola City Council from At-large district 9
- In office 2001–2009
- Preceded by: Redistricted
- Succeeded by: Megan Pratt

Member of the Pensacola City Council from At-large district C
- In office 1994–2001
- Preceded by: Tom Banjanin
- Succeeded by: Redistricted

Personal details
- Born: September 1945 (age 80) Pensacola, Florida, U.S.
- Party: Republican
- Education: Pensacola Junior College; Florida State University
- Website: Campaign website

Military service
- Allegiance: United States
- Branch/service: United States Navy
- Rank: Lieutenant

Michael C. Wiggins (born September 1945) is an American businessman and politician who served as the 61st mayor of Pensacola from 2009 to 2011.

Wiggins served in the United States Navy, becoming a Lieutenant, before serving on the Pensacola City Council from 1994 to 2009. As mayor, Wiggins oversaw the creation of the Community Maritime Park, a new council–manager charter, and the Deepwater Horizon Oil Spill.

== Early life and education ==
Michael C. Wiggins was born in September 1945 in Pensacola, Florida. He attended Pensacola Junior College before obtaining a degree in finance from Florida State University.

== Career ==
After graduating from Florida State University, Wiggins served in the United States Navy as an officer for four years, eventually reaching the rank of Lieutenant.

In 1994, Wiggins was elected to Pensacola City Council At-large district C, to fill the seat after Tom Banjanin was elected to the Escambia County board of Commissioners. In 2001, after City Council redistricting, Wiggins was elected to At-large district 9, where he served until 2009, and was succeeded by Megan Pratt.

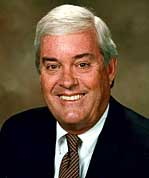
Official portrait, 2009

In 2008, Wiggins was elected as the 61st mayor of Pensacola, defeating candidates Christopher J. Lewis and Eric Schmitz. He was sworn in on January 12, 2009. During his time as mayor, Wiggins oversaw the creation of the Community Maritime Park, a new mayor–council charter, although he opposed it, and the Deepwater Horizon Oil Spill, which he meet with President Barack Obama and Vice President Joe Biden, separately, in 2010. Wiggins served until 2011, when he was defeated for re-election by Ashton Hayward. Hayward was sworn in on January 10, 2011.

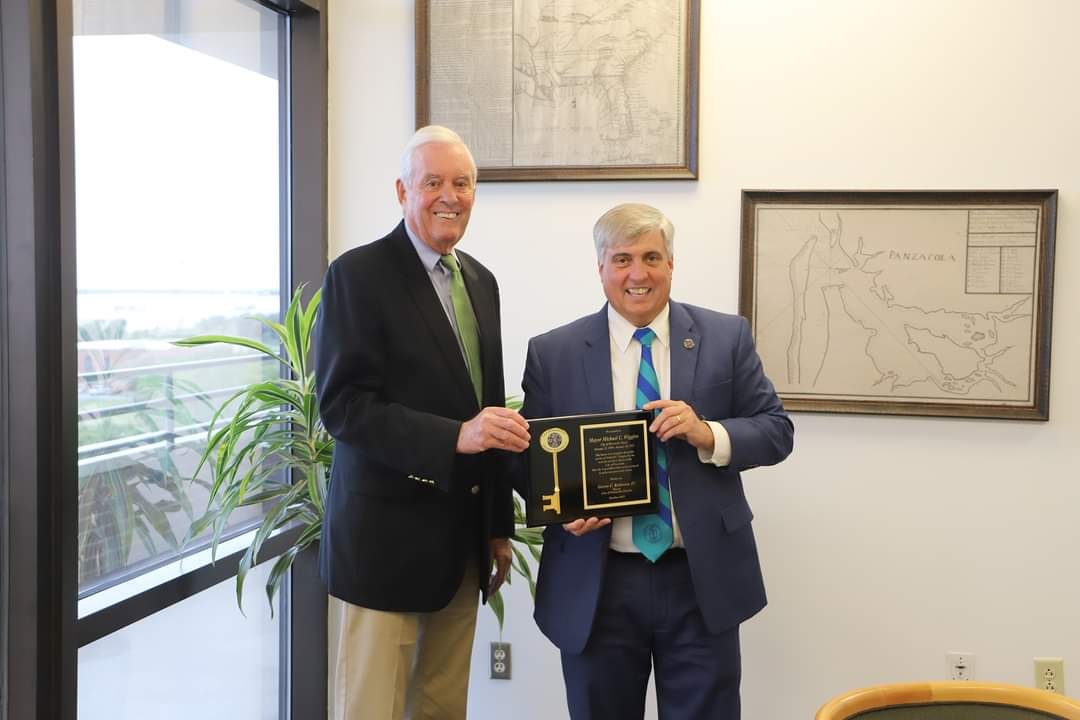
Wiggins being presented the key to the city by Mayor Grover Robinson IV in 2022

Wiggins has served on the board of governors of Pensacola State College, board of directors of the Pensacola Museum of Art, board of directors of Clean and Green, board of the Greater Escambia Community foundation, board of the Tourism Advisory committee, chair of the Pensacola State College foundation, Five Flags Rotary and the Chamber of Commerce.

Wiggins owned the lawn care business Wiggins Lawn Spray Service, which he sold to the Pensacola-based Lawn care company Lawn Master, Inc. on January 1, 2015.

== See also ==
- List of mayors of Pensacola, Florida
