= Salvador T. Pons =

American politician

Salvador T. Pons (December 23, 1835 - March 21, 1890) was a bricklayer and politician in Pensacola, Florida. He served in the Florida House of Representatives for Escambia County from 1868-1870 and in 1875. He served as Pensacola's mayor in 1874 and was on the city council in 1869, 1870 and 1874. He was a clerk for Pensacola from 1877-1880 and from 1882-1884. He was described as small in stature and was praised by Stephen R. Mallory. He attended the Convention of Colored People in Nashville in 1876.

He was born in Mexico. His father was a White seaman and his mother Maria Rosario had African ancestry. He was described as Creole and "mulatto".

He caught Yellow Fever in 1882. In 1885, Democrats ousted Pensacola's elected officials and the city archives burned. He died in 1890 and is buried at St. Michaels Cemetery in downtown Pensacola.

John Pons served as an Escambia County Commissioner from 1868 to 1870 and as Escambia County tax assessor in 1874 and 1875. He also worked as a federal customs inspector in Warrenton. He died December 21, 1912. A historical marker commemorates his history.

== See also ==
- List of mayors of Pensacola, Florida
- African American officeholders from the end of the Civil War until before 1900
