= Clay Ingram =

American politician

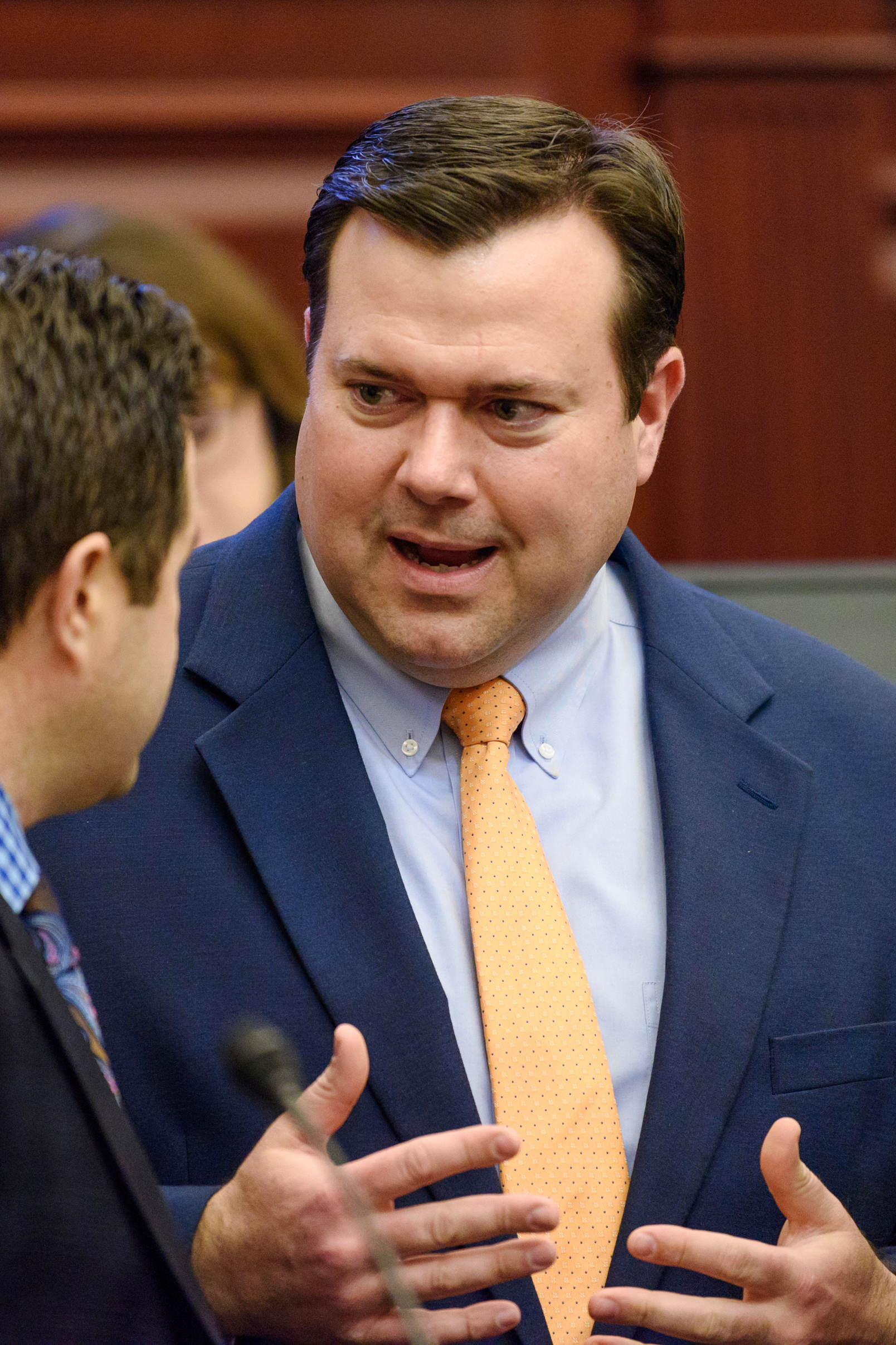

Member of the Florida House of Representatives
- In office November 4, 2008 – November 8, 2016
- Preceded by: Doug Broxson
- Succeeded by: Mike Hill
- Constituency: 2nd district (2010–2012); 1st district (2012–2018)

Personal details
- Born: February 5, 1978 (age 48) Pensacola, Florida
- Party: Republican
- Spouse: Leslie Cagle Ingram
- Children: Madilyn / Lydia
- Education: Florida State University (BS)
- Profession: Teacher and real estate

Clay Ingram (born February 5, 1978) is a Republican politician from Florida. He served in the Florida House of Representatives from 2010 to 2018, representing parts of Escambia County.

== History ==
Ingram was born in Pensacola, Florida. He served as Chairman of the Escambia County Republican Party from 2005 to 2008 and has also served on the Executive Board of the Republican Party of Florida. He has taught and previously coached football at J. M. Tate High School in Gonzalez.

Ingram attended Florida State University and played football as a walk-on under coach Bobby Bowden. Ingram was a long snapper for the Seminoles and played on the 1999 undefeated National Championship team.

== Florida House of Representatives ==
When Republican State Representative Dave Murzin was unable to seek another term due to term limits, Ingram ran to succeed him. He defeated David M. Karasek in the Republican primary and was unopposed in the general election. When the Florida House of Representatives districts were reconfigured in 2012, Ingram was drawn into the 1st District, and ran for re-election there. He won his party's nomination and the general election unopposed.

In the Allied Veterans of the World scandal, in which a supposedly non-profit organization was reportedly operating a "$300 million criminal enterprise and which resulted in the resignation of Lieutenant Governor of Florida Jennifer Carroll in 2013, Ingram has come under fire for accepting campaign contributions from the group in question.

While serving in the legislature, Ingram sponsored legislation with Republican State Senator Rob Bradley to propose legislation "that would permanently outlaw several banned substances commonly found in synthetic marijuana."

Running for re-election in 2014, Ingram faced Gloria Robertson-Wiggins, the Democratic nominee, in the general election. Owing to the conservative nature of his district, she did not present a significant challenge to him, and he won re-election in a landslide, receiving 69% of the vote to Robertson-Wiggins's 31%.
