= Charles P. Mason =

U.S. Navy vice admiral and mayor of Pensacola

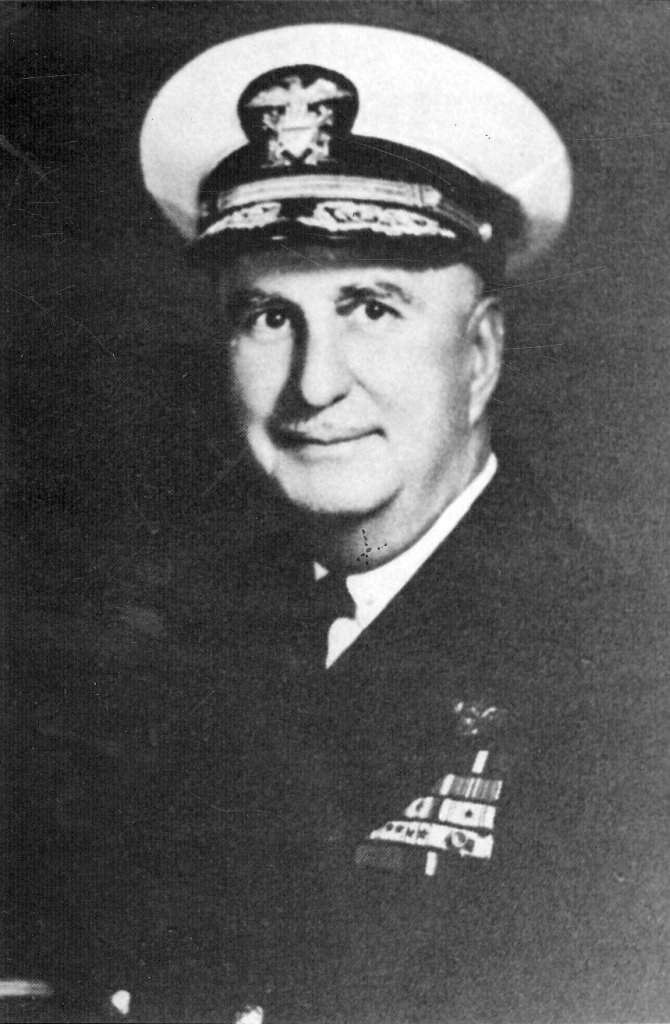
- VADM Charles P. Mason, USN
- Born: January 12, 1891; Harrisburg, Pennsylvania, US
- Died: August 15, 1971 (aged 80); Pensacola, Florida, US
- Burial place: St. John's Cemetery, Florida
- Military career
- Allegiance: United States
- Branch: United States Navy
- Service years: 1912–1946
- Rank: Vice Admiral
- Commands: Aircraft, Solomons; Naval Air Station Corpus Christi; USS Hornet (CV-8); Naval Air Station Jacksonville; Patrol Wing One
- Conflicts: Mexican Revolution; Veracruz expedition; World War I; World War II; Guadalcanal Campaign; Battle of the Santa Cruz Islands; Solomon Islands campaign
- Awards: Navy Cross; Legion of Merit; Bronze Star Medal
- Other work: 49th mayor of Pensacola

Charles Perry Mason (January 12, 1891 – August 15, 1971) was a highly decorated officer in the United States Navy with the rank of vice admiral. An early naval aviator, he distinguished himself as commanding officer of aircraft carrier USS Hornet (CV-8), which was sunk during the Battle of the Santa Cruz Islands in late October 1942. Mason was subsequently promoted to rear admiral and served successively as commander, Aircraft, Solomons and chief of the Naval Air Intermediate Training Command at Naval Air Station Pensacola, Florida.

He retired from the Navy following the war and served as deputy state director of Florida Civil Defense, before he was appointed the mayor of Pensacola, the office which he held two times from 1947 to 1957 and again from 1963 to 1965.

== Early career ==
Mason was born on January 12, 1891, in Harrisburg, Pennsylvania, son of fireman William Charles and Gertrude Rider Mason. He graduated from the high school in Columbia, Pennsylvania, in summer 1908 and received an appointment to the United States Naval Academy at Annapolis, Maryland. While at the academy, Mason was active in football, baseball and track and held numerals for excellence.

Mason graduated with Bachelor of Science degree in June 1912 and was commissioned ensign. His Naval Academy classmates included future Admirals Daniel E. Barbey, Elliot Buckmaster, Louis E. Denfield, Charles A. Lockwood, Alfred E. Montgomery, DeWitt C. Ramsey, Mahlon Tisdale, Louis Wenzell, and Carleton F. Wright. He was subsequently assigned to battleship Connecticut, participating in the operations with the Atlantic Fleet, before Connecticut was ordered to the Mexican waters to protect American interests during the Mexican Revolution in June 1914. Mason was promoted to Lieutenant (junior grade) in June 1915 and transferred to light cruiser Chester.

In June 1916, Mason requested for flight training and was ordered to the Naval Air Station Pensacola, Florida. He was designated Naval aviator #52 on June 26, 1917, and remained at the Pensacola Air Station as an instructor until the fall of 1917. During his service there, he was promoted to lieutenant on August 31, 1917. Mason was then transferred to Long Island, New York and briefly held command of Naval Air Station Bay Shore there.

Mason was transferred to Washington, D.C., in December 1917, and served in the Office of the Chief of Naval Operations under Admiral William S. Benson until April 1918. He was then ordered to Europe and assumed duty as officer-in-charge of inspection and test of airplanes at the Naval Air Station at Pauillac, France. While in this capacity, Mason flew the first American-built seaplane powered with single and twin-engined Liberty motors delivered to the U.S. Naval Air Forces in Europe. He was promoted to the temporary rank of lieutenant commander on September 21, 1918.

Following the Armistice, Mason was ordered to London, England, and assigned to Armistice commission as a member of the Heavier than air board and participated in the inspection of German air stations. He was later commended by the British Admiralty and also received a letter of commendation from the Secretary of the Navy Josephus Daniels for his service during the war.

== Interwar period ==
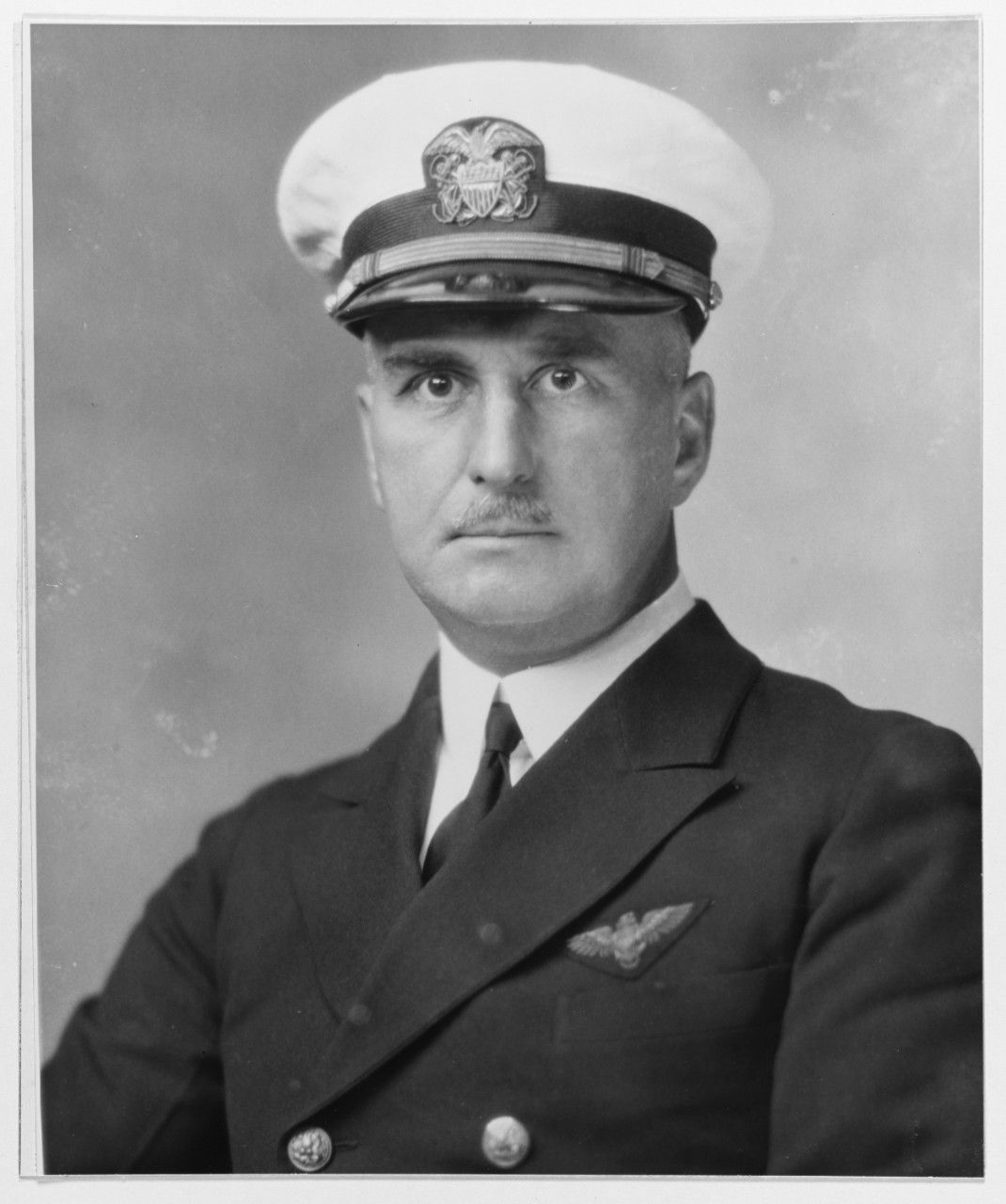
Mason as lieutenant commander in October 1922.

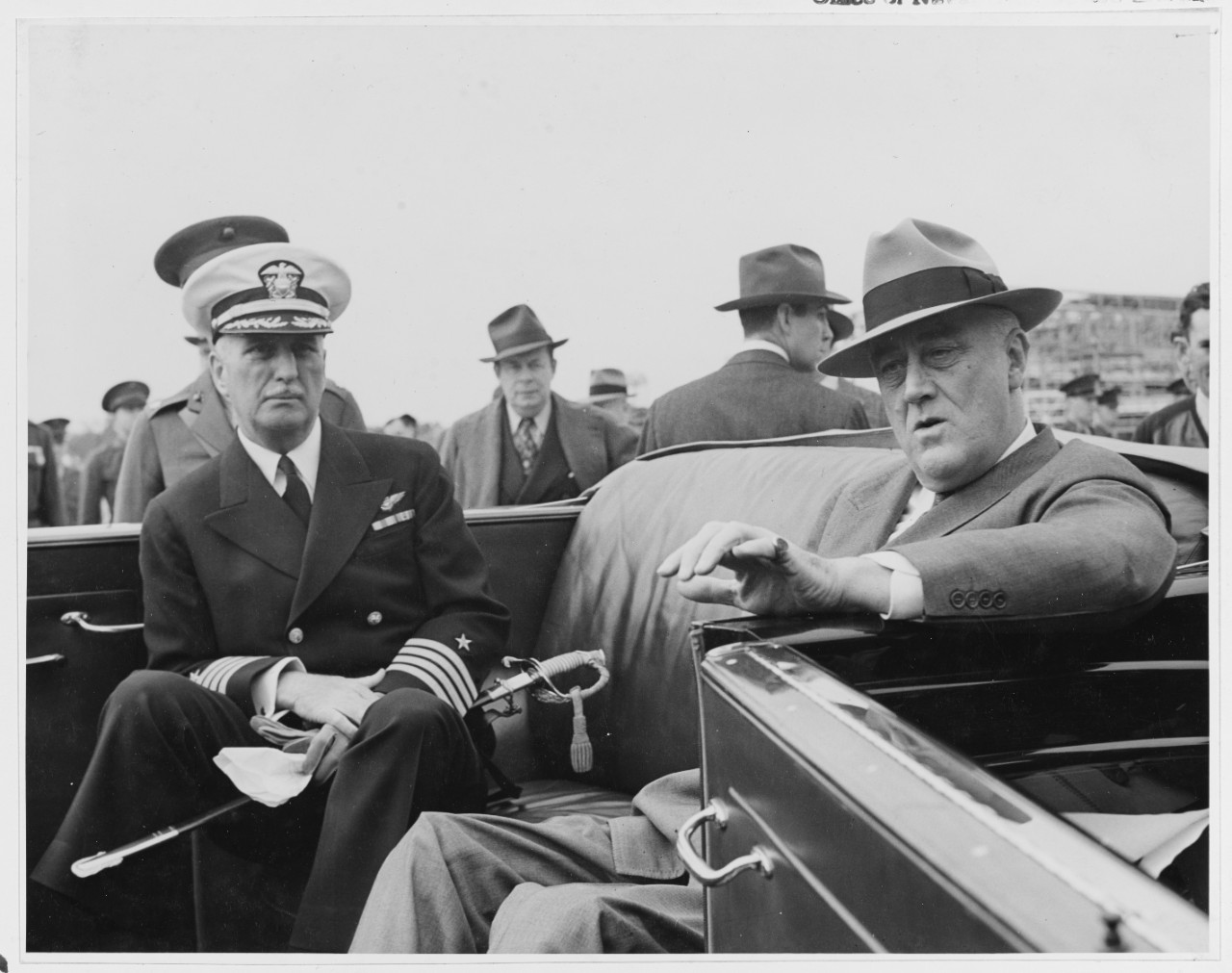
Mason (left) with President Franklin D. Roosevelt during the commissioning ceremony of NAS Jacksonville, Florida, on October 15, 1940.

Mason returned to the United States in January 1919 and assumed command of Naval Air Station Key West, Florida. While in this capacity he qualified as Lighter than air pilot and was transferred to Aroostook, flagship of Air Detachments of the Pacific Fleet. Mason later organized the first seaplane patrol squadron of the Pacific Fleet and led his unit during the successful flight from San Diego, California, to Panama Canal Zone in January–March 1921. He was promoted to the permanent rank of lieutenant commander on October 22, 1922.

In May 1923, Mason was ordered to the Naval Air Station Pensacola, Florida, and assumed duty as Superintendent of Training Flight Schools. He remained in that assignment until December that year, when he was transferred to Naval Air Station Anacostia in Washington, D.C., for duty in connection with organizing of Scouting Plane Squadron 3. Mason then led his squadron aboard seaplane tender Wright operating with the Scouting Fleet until the spring of 1925, when he was ordered back to Pensacola for duty as commander of Aviation Department aboard aircraft carrier Langley.

Mason was transferred to the Bureau of Aeronautics in Washington, D.C., in July 1926 and after brief tour of duty, he was sent to the American Brown Boveri Company in Camden, New Jersey, for duty in connection with fitting out aircraft carrier Saratoga. He was detached in the spring of 1928 and rejoined the staff of Naval Air Station Pensacola, Florida. During his tenure there, Mason's planes took part in the providing assistance during the 1929 floods in Alabama and Southern Florida, dropping food, clothing and medicine to isolated towns.

During June 1931, Mason assumed duty as aide on the staff of commander, aircraft, Scouting Force under Captain George W. Steele Jr and served in that capacity for one year, before was appointed executive officer of aircraft carrier Langley under command of Commander Patrick N. L. Bellinger. While aboard Langley Mason was stationed in Hawaii and participated in the fleet exercise off the coast of California. During that period, Mason also completed correspondence course in strategy and tactics at the Naval War College in Newport, Rhode Island.

On June 30, 1933, Mason was promoted to commander and transferred to the Naval Air Station Norfolk, Virginia, where he assumed duty as executive officer under Captain Aubrey W. Fitch. During his service there, he helped to organize a flight of a squadron of planes (Consolidated P2Ys) in September 1933 that flew from Norfolk to Coco Solo, Panama Canal Zone, a distance of 2,159 statute miles, the longest formation flight on record at that time.

Mason was ordered to the Newport News Shipbuilding and Dry Dock Company in Newport News, Virginia, in August 1935 and assumed duty in connection with fitting out of aircraft carrier Yorktown. He spent two years there, during which Yorktown was completed and commissioned on September 30, 1937, with Captain Ernest D. McWhorter in command. Mason was appointed his executive officer and took part in her shakedown cruise to the Caribbean, visiting Culebra, Puerto Rico; Charlotte Amalie, St Thomas, U.S. Virgin Islands; Gonaïves, Haiti; Guantanamo Bay, Cuba, and Cristóbal, Panama Canal Zone.

He served in that assignment until he was promoted to captain on July 1, 1939, and appointed commander, Patrol Wing One subordinated to the Aircraft, Scouting Force under Rear Admiral Arthur B. Cook. Mason was stationed with his command in San Diego, California, until September 1940, when he was appointed first commanding officer of Naval Air Station Jacksonville, Florida. His main duty was to plan and execute the naval flight training of pilots and airmen.

== World War II ==
=== Service in South Pacific ===
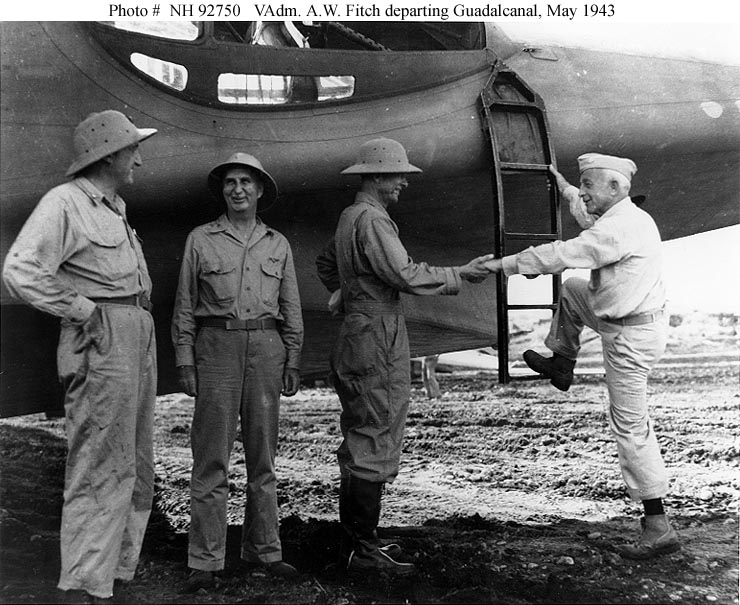
Mason (second from left) observes as Vice admiral Aubrey W. Fitch (right), Commander, Aircraft, South Pacific Force, boards a PBY-5A aircraft at Guadalcanal, March 1943.

Following the Japanese attack on Pearl Harbor on December 7, 1941, and the United States entry into World War II, Mason was still serving in Jacksonville. He remained in that assignment until mid-June 1942, when he was ordered to South Pacific and relieved Captain Marc A. Mitscher as commanding officer of aircraft carrier Hornet. Mason led Hornet to Pearl Harbor, Hawaii, and spent next six weeks with replenishing her stores, having minor repairs performed, and having additional light anti-aircraft guns and the new air-search radar fitted.

In mid-August 1942, Mason led Hornet to guard the sea approaches to the bitterly contested island of Guadalcanal in the Solomon Islands. Due to damage and the loss of other aircraft carriers in the area, Hornet became the only operational U.S. carrier in the South Pacific. She was responsible for providing air cover over the Solomon Islands, scoring hits on Japanese tanker; light cruiser, and two cargo ships in Buin-Faisi Area; and shooting down several enemy planes and bombing the Kahili Airfield on Bougainville Island in early October. Mason then commanded air raids against two enemy beached transports at Kekata Bay which destroyed several landing barges, fuel dumps, anti-aircraft installations and shot down 12 seaplanes.

On October 26, 1942, Hornet was attacked by Japanese dive bombers and torpedo planes off the Santa Cruz Islands and suffered damage by bombs, while two Aichi D3A "Val" dive bombers crashed into the carrier; one into the island and other the port side near the bow. Mason directed the fighting of his ship, and his planes damaged an enemy aircraft carrier and another three heavy cruisers. Hornet electrical system and engines were damaged and the carrier came to a halt. During the repairs, another torpedo hit destroyed the repairs to the electrical system and caused a 14-degree list. Due to information that Japanese surface forces were approaching and that further towing efforts were futile, Vice admiral William Halsey Jr. ordered Hornet sunk, and an order of "abandon ship" was issued. Mason was the last man on board, climbed over the side, and the survivors were soon picked up by the escorting destroyers. All but 129 of her 2900 men were rescued. For his service as commanding officer of Hornet, Mason was decorated with the Navy Cross, the United States second-highest military decoration awarded for valor in combat.

Mason was subsequently promoted to rear admiral and assigned to Admiral Halsey's staff. He remained in that assignment until late January 1943, when Halsey decided to succeed Cactus Air Force by joint air command and created the commander, Aircraft, Solomon Islands in February 1943. His command was stationed on Guadalcanal and included Army, Navy and Marine Air units stationed on the island during the final phase of its defense. Unfortunately, Mason became ill with severe malaria and pneumonia and was evacuated to the United States in April 1943.

=== Stateside service ===
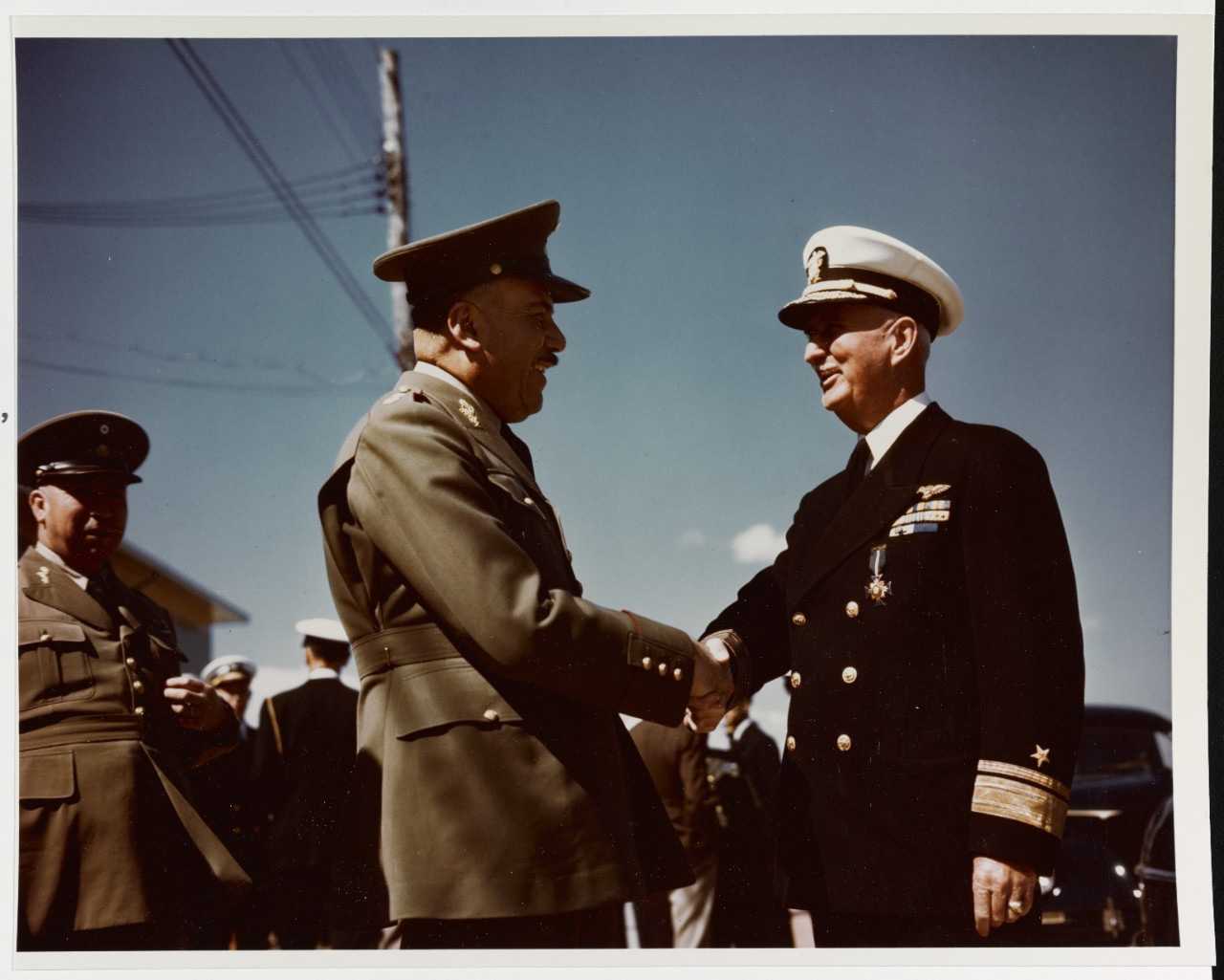
General Francisco Urquizo, under secretary of National Defense, Republic of Mexico, congratulates Mason, after presenting him with the Mexican Military Merit Order, 1st Class in ceremonies at N.A.S. Corpus Christi, Texas.

Following few weeks in the naval hospital, Mason reported to Naval Air Station Corpus Christi, Texas, as commander of Naval Air Training Center. By the end of December that year, he was appointed chief of the Naval Air Intermediate Training Command at Naval Air Station Pensacola, Florida, with additional duty as commander of Naval Air Station Corpus Christi, Texas. Within this capacity, Mason was responsible for the advanced naval flight training of pilots and airmen.

The personnel, who successfully completed primary training, were passed to intermediate training, which was a fourteen-week course, concentrated at Pensacola and Corpus Christi. During Mason's tenure, additional fields and seaplane facilities were constructed and each station had 400 scout and patrol bombers, 300 fighters, and 200 torpedo bombers. At the end of the course, the successful students were designated naval aviators (officers) or naval aviation pilots (enlisted men). Mason remained in that capacity until May 1945, when he was relieved by Rear Admiral Joseph J. Clark and ordered to Pearl Harbor, Hawaii, for duty as commander, Naval Air Bases, Fourteenth Naval District. Within this command, he was responsible for all air stations and air unit deployed on the Hawaiian Islands, and islands to westward, including Midway, Wake, Kure, and Johnston, and Kingman Reef.

Mason remained in that assignment until April 1, 1946, when he retired from active duty, completing 34 years of commissioned service. He was subsequently advanced to the rank of vice admiral on the retired list for having been specially commended in combat. Mason received Legion of Merit for his service as chief of the Naval Air Intermediate Training Command; and Bronze Star Medal for his service on Hawaii; and also was decorated by Allied nations such as Brazil, Chile, Mexico, and Peru.

== Later life ==
Upon his retirement from the Navy, Mason settled in Jacksonville, Florida, but later moved to Pensacola, where he served as Deputy State Director of Florida Civil Defense. He later headed the Pensacola Historical Society and served as a member of the city council, before he was elected as the 49th mayor of Pensacola in June 1947. Mason was reappointed Mayor in 1949 and in 1951 was reappointed both to the City council and Mayor. He remained in that capacity until 1957, when he was succeeded by Roy S. Philpot. During Mason's tenure, the city increased size from less than 10 square miles to more than 17 square miles. A new public library was built and the library moved from Old Christ Church. Plans for a municipal auditorium were completed and an old Frisco engine was given to the city and placed in the Garden Street plaza.

Six years later, Mason ran for mayor again and was elected, holding the office until 1965. Upon his second retirement, the Florida legislature designated him honorary Pensacola Mayor for life. Mason was also a member of the Boy Scouts of America; Early Birds of Aviation and served as its president.

He and his wife Ralphine Fisher raised their grandson, Charles P. Mason III, who was orphaned after his father Lieutenant Charles P. Mason Jr. died in an airplane crash in Nevada in September 1944 and after their daughter-in-law, Cornelia Amos was killed in a car crash in 1949. Charles P. Mason III graduated from the U.S. Naval Academy and became a naval aviator same as both his father and grandfather did.

Vice admiral Charles P. Mason died at his home in Pensacola, Florida, on August 15, 1971, aged 80 and was buried at St. John's Cemetery in Pensacola. Admiral Mason Park in Pensacola was named in his honor.

== Decorations ==
Here is the ribbon bar of Vice Admiral Mason:

Naval Aviator Badge
1st Row	Navy Cross		
2nd Row	Legion of Merit	Bronze Star Medal	Mexican Service Medal
3rd Row	World War I Victory Medal with Overseas Clasp	American Defense Service Medal with Fleet Clasp	Asiatic-Pacific Campaign Medal with four 3/16 inch service stars
4th Row	American Campaign Medal	World War II Victory Medal	Order of the Southern Cross, rank Commander (Brazil)
5th Row	Order of Merit, Commander (Chile)	Peruvian Aviation Cross, 1st Class	Mexican Military Merit Order, 1st Class
