= VMFA-122 =

United States military unit

Marine Fighter Attack Squadron 122
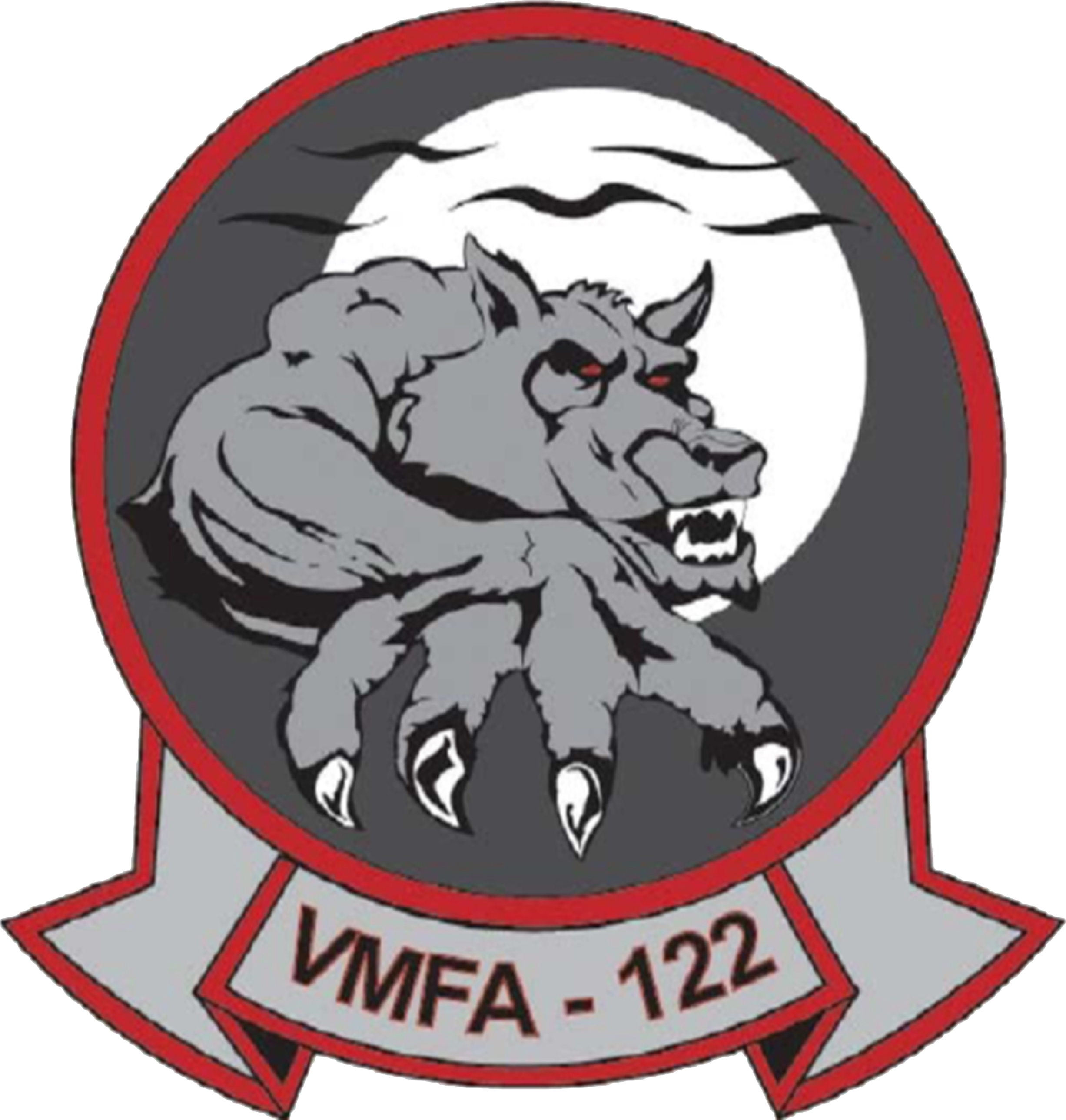
- VMFA-122 Insignia
- Active: 1 March 1942–present
- Country: United States of America
- Branch: United States Marine Corps
- Type: Fighter/Attack
- Role: Close air support Air interdiction Aerial reconnaissance
- Part of: Marine Aircraft Group 13; 3rd Marine Aircraft Wing
- Garrison/HQ: Marine Corps Air Station Yuma
- Nicknames: Werewolves (January, 2008-December, 2016, February 2025-present); The Flying Leathernecks (December, 2016 – February 2025); Crusaders (1957-4 January 2008); Candystripers (WWII); Werewolves (WWII) "The Last Blue Collar Squadron"
- Tail Code: DC
- Mascot: Mach Altus
- Engagements: World War II; Battle of New Georgia; Vietnam War; Operation Desert Storm; Operation Enduring Freedom; Operation Iraqi Freedom

Commanders
- Commanding Officer: LtCol. Michael Golike
- Executive Officer: Maj Zeb Josey
- Notable commanders: Col. Gregory "Pappy" Boyington; MajGen. Marion E. Carl; LtCol. John Fogg

Aircraft flown
- Fighter: F4F Wildcat; F4U Corsair; FH-1 Phantom; F2H Banshee; F6F Hellcat; F9F Panther; FJ Fury; F-8 Crusader; F-4 Phantom; F/A-18A/C Hornet; F-35B Lightning II

Marine Fighter Attack Squadron 122 (VMFA-122) is a United States Marine Corps fighter attack squadron flying the F-35B Lightning II. The squadron is based out of Marine Corps Air Station Yuma, AZ and falls under the command of Marine Aircraft Group 13 (MAG-13) and the 3rd Marine Aircraft Wing (3rd MAW). The squadron nickname is the "Werewolves," and their traditional radio call sign is "Nikel".

== Mission ==
Conduct anti-air warfare and offensive air support operations in support of Fleet Marine Forces from advance bases, expeditionary airfields, and aircraft carriers, and to conduct such other air operations as may be directed.

== History ==
=== World War II ===
Marine Fighting Squadron 122 (VMF-122) was commissioned on March 1, 1942, at Camp Kearny in San Diego, California. Outfitted with the F4F Wildcat, the squadron beganits first combat tour in October 1942. During this tour the squadron was part of the Cactus Air Force at Henderson Field while also operating out of Espiritu Santo. In April 1943, while under the command of Major Pappy Boyington, the squadron transitioned to the F4U Corsair and accounted for 35½ kills. The squadron's first combat tour ended on July 23, 1943, after which it returned to Marine Corps Air Station Miramar on August 16, 1943. For the next year after their return to the States, the squadron was reorganized and retrained at Marine Corps Air Station El Centro, California.

Squadron logo from WWII

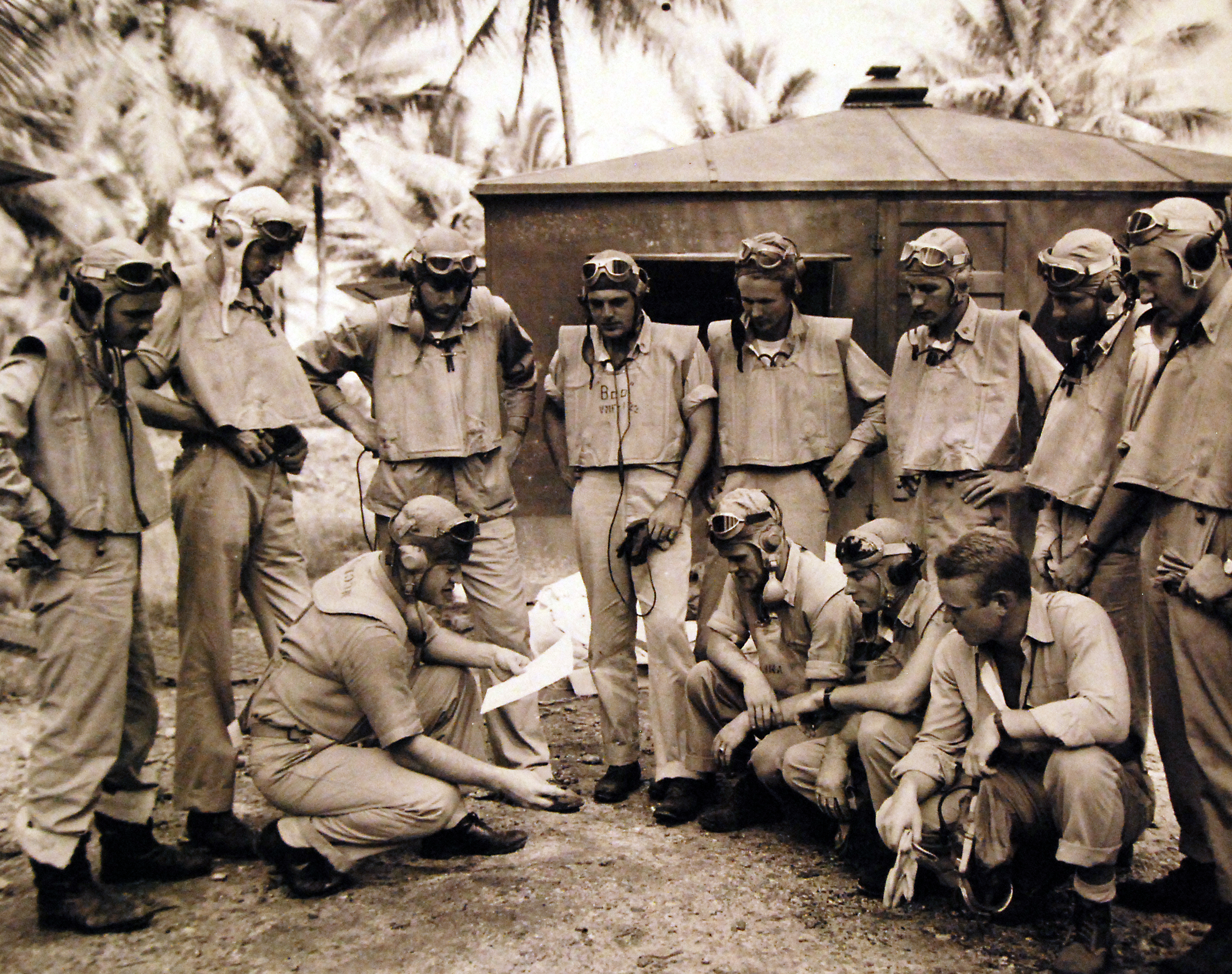
Lower left Major Boyington with pilots of VMF-122 (Not VMF-214;see designation of life vest in center)

For its second tour, VMF-122's flight echelon embarked upon the escort carrier USS Hollandia in July 1944 while the ground echelon steamed out on the USS Tryon. Beginning in October 1944 the echelons were reunited and began operating from an airstrip on Peleliu. At times they provided close air support for Marines during the Battle of Peleliu at distances of just over 1000 yards from where they took off. The squadrons ability to provide napalm and rockets, both new weapons systems, greatly aided in the destruction of the last Japanese strongholds on the island. For the remainder of the war they remained on the island conducting combat operations until August 1945.

Following the surrender of Japan, VMF-122 returned home to Marine Corps Auxiliary Air Station Oak Grove, North Carolina in January 1946. They remained there for less than two years before being moved to MCAS Beaufort which was followed by another move to Marine Corps Air Station Cherry Point, North Carolina.

=== 1950s ===
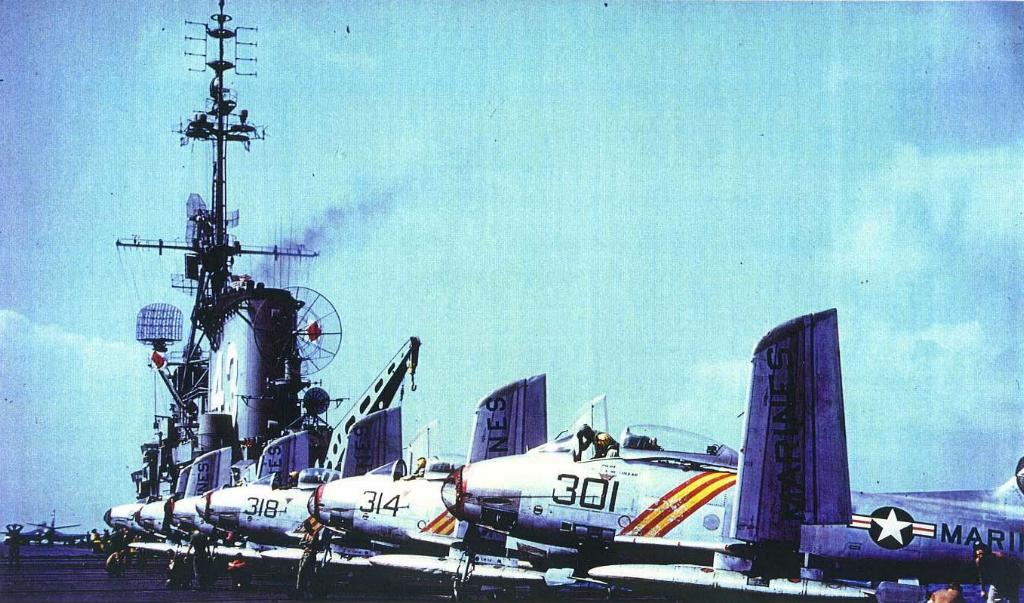
FJ-2s of VMF-122 on the USS Coral Sea in 1955.

The squadron was reactivated in November 1947, flying the FH Phantom, becoming the first Marine squadron to employ jet-propelled aircraft. During this time, the squadron also fielded the first and only Marine aerial demonstration team known as the "Flying Leathernecks". They toured the country for two years before being disbanded with the transition to the F2H Banshee. In April 1951, the squadron became the first Marine jet squadron to be both day and night qualified for carrier operations. On 15 May 1951, the squadron deployed from Naval Air Station Quonset Point aboard the USS Oriskany to the Mediterranean Sea, returning to the Marine Corps Air Station, Cherry Point in early October 1951. The squadron transitioned to the F9F-5 Panther in 1952 and completed carrier qualifications in February 1953 prior to another Mediterranean deployment. During its six-month cruise on board the USS Coral Sea (CV-43), the squadron's twenty jets flew more than 2700 hours, during 1800 missions, completing more than 1750 carrier landing with no loss of aircraft. Upon the completion of the deployment in the fall of 1953, VMF-122 was assigned to Marine Aircraft Group 24 at MCAS Cherry Point.

January 1954 again saw the squadron transitioning aircraft, this time to the FJ Fury. The next few years saw a litany of small deployments on board a multitude of aircraft carriers. The squadron relocated to Marine Corps Air Station Beaufort in September 1957 and in December of that year they became the first squadron in the Marine Corps to fly the F-8 Crusader. It was at this time that they transitioned from being the "Candystripers" to the new nickname of "Crusaders." The squadron became VMF(AW)-122 upon receiving all weather capable F-8Es in 1962. That year they also deployed to Key West, Florida to fly combat air patrol during the Cuban Missile Crisis.

=== Vietnam War ===
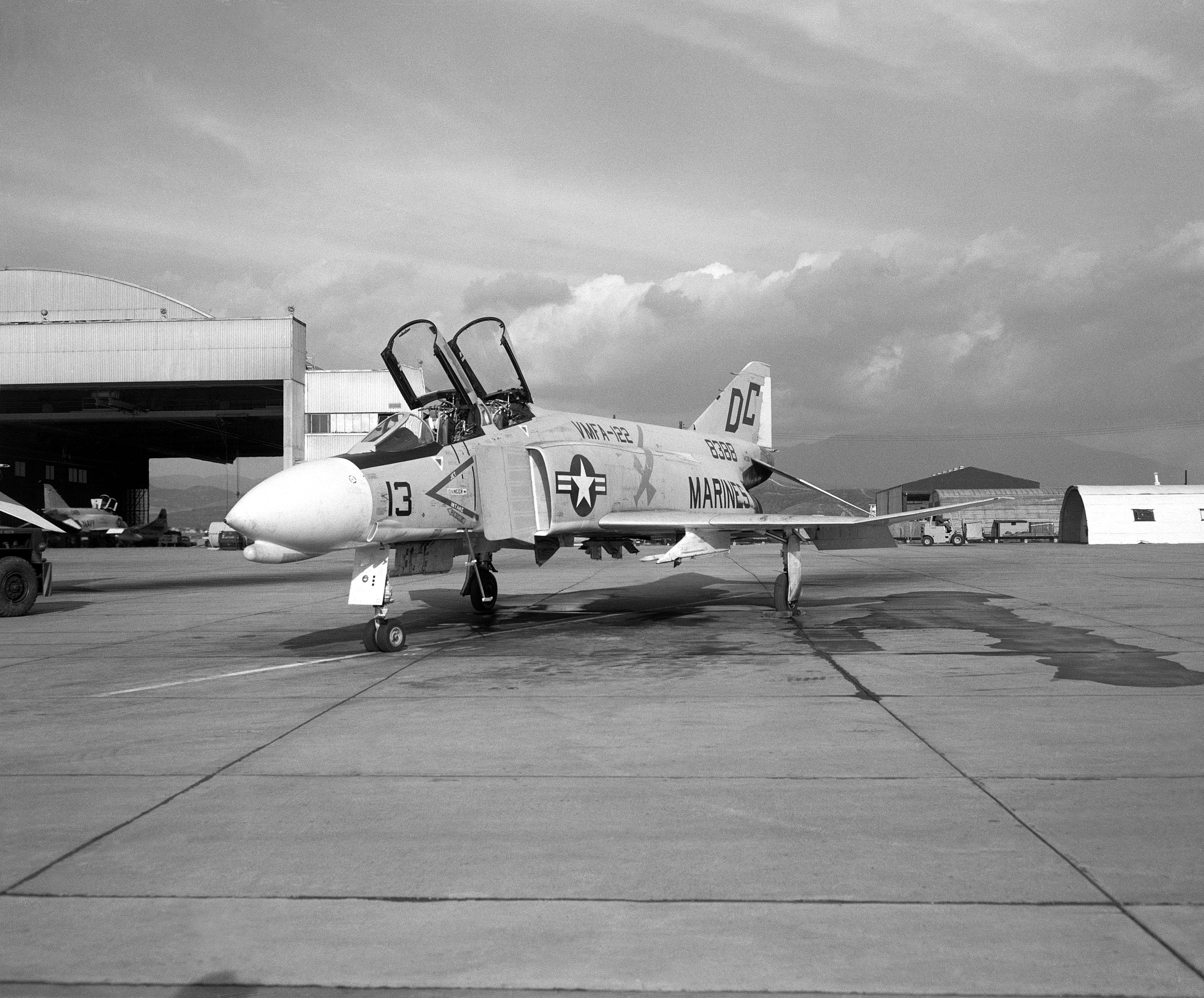
F-4B at MCAS El Toro, 1966

In 1964, VMF(AW)-122 deployed to Naval Air Facility Atsugi for a year and returned to Marine Corps Air Station El Toro in January 1965. While at MCAS El Toro they transitioned to the F-4B Phantom and were redesignated VMFA-122. They deployed to the Republic of Vietnam in August 1967 and operated from Da Nang Air Base. For the next five months, the squadron flew 2540 sorties and delivered 4800 tons of ordnance. In February 1968, while supporting Marines during the Siege of Khe Sanh the squadron flew 629 sorties and dropped 1300 tons of ordnance. They rotated to Marine Corps Air Station Iwakuni in September 1968 and returned to Vietnam during the summer of 1969, this time operating from Chu Lai Air Base.

=== 1970s through 1990s ===
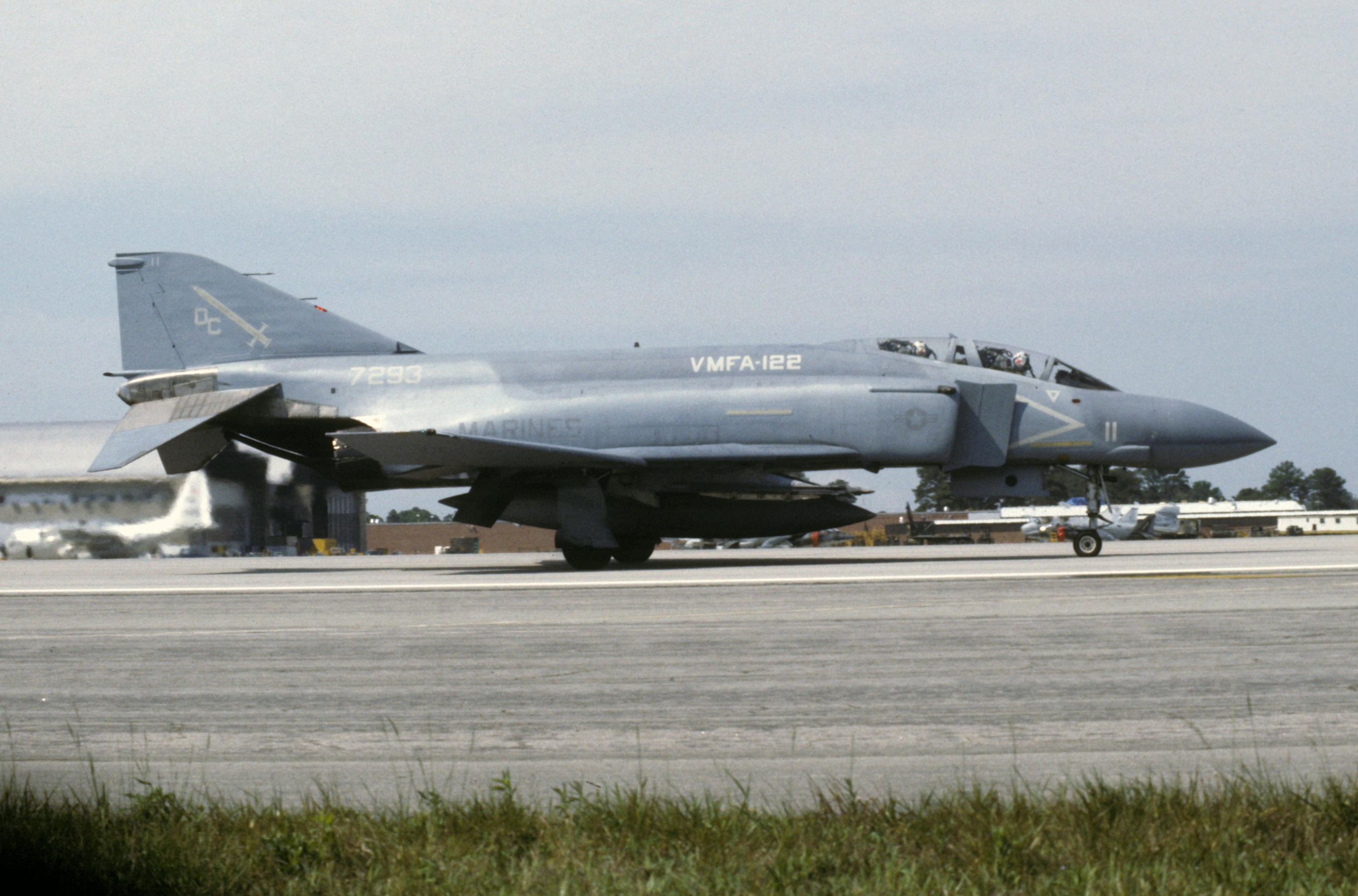
VMFA-122 F-4S at MCAS Cherry Point, 1 June 1985.

Following their time in Vietnam, the Crusaders were assigned to MCAS Kaneohe Bay, Hawaii in September 1970. They were then ordered to MCAS Iwakuni, Japan as a Joint Chiefs of Staff directive to counter a North Vietnamese offensive against South Vietnam. The squadron returned to Kaneohe Bay, Hawaii on 27 December 1972. On 14 August 1974, VMFA-122 was placed in a cadre status in anticipation of becoming the Marine Corps’ first F-14A squadron. With the decision not to accept the Tomcat into the Marine Corps inventory, VMFA-122 was reactivated at MCAS Beaufort, South Carolina and refitted with the F-4J in September 1975. On 25 September 1985, VMFA-122 flew its last F-4 sortie, completing 20 years of service as an F-4 "Phantom" squadron.

On 22 January 1986, the squadron began a new era with the acceptance of its first F/A-18A Hornet. Throughout the 1980s, 1990s, and into the 2000s (decade), VMFA-122 conducted multiple training deployments to Europe and throughout the United States.

=== Global war on terrorism ===
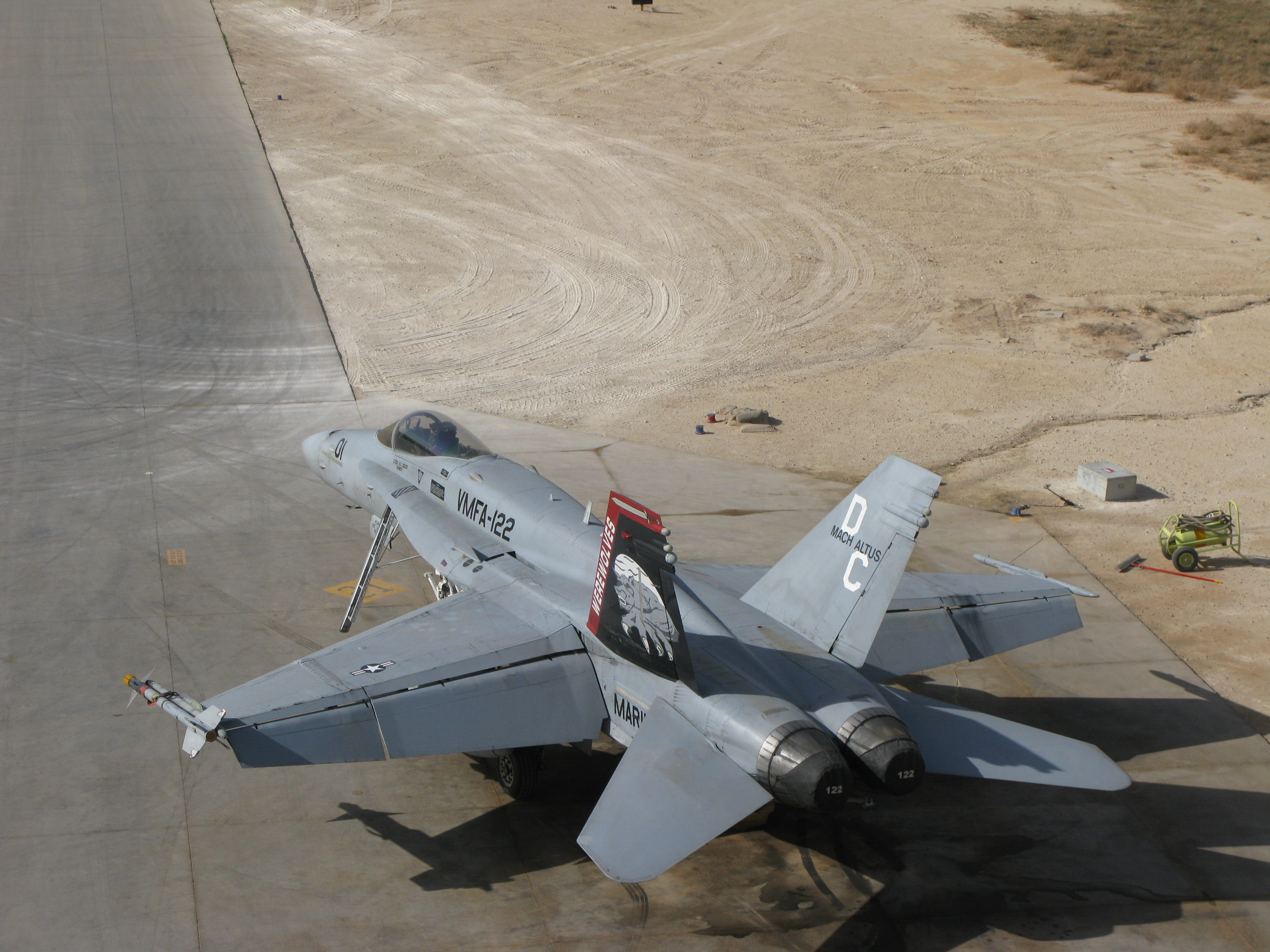
F/A-18 at Al-Asad Airbase in 2009.

In October 2001, the Crusaders increased their combat capabilities by transitioning to the F/A-18C. The squadron participated in the Unit Deployment Program (UDP), completing eleven deployments to the Western Pacific. From July 2002 to July 2003, the Crusaders completed a year-long UDP due to the "stop-move" order implemented by the Marine Corps. This allowed Hornet squadrons from Beaufort to deploy to Kuwait in anticipation of Operation Iraqi Freedom (OIF) in January 2003. The Crusaders were dispatched from MCAS Iwakuni to many locations in the Pacific Rim, including Marine Corps Air Facility Kaneohe Bay in Hawaii and Clark AB in the Philippines. In January 2005, the "Crusaders" continued the UDP rotation, deploying to MCAS Iwakuni, Japan. In September 2006 the "Crusaders" again returned to MCAS Iwakuni with detachments to Clark AB in the Philippines, Kadena Air Force Base on Okinawa, and Khorat, Thailand.

Prior to another squadron deployment in support of OIF later in 2008, the squadron's commander reverted the unit to their older World War II nickname, the Werewolves. The squadron began its first combat deployment in more than 30 years when it left MCAS Beaufort on 29 August 2008, for Al Asad Air Base, Iraq. The Werewolves returned from their seven-month deployment on 21 March 2009. They deployed again to Kandahar Airfield, KAF in November 2010 through May 2011. In April, 2012, the new commander of VMFA-122, LtCol Wiegel, decided the squadron would revert to the "Crusaders" nickname. However, after the nonprofit Military Religious Freedom Foundation threatened to sue the military under the Establishment Clause to forbid the Crusaders name and logo, the Marine Deputy Commandant for aviation directed VMFA-122 to revert the unit identification back to "Werewolves." In December 2016, the squadron nickname and logo changed again, and VMFA-122 became the "Flying Leathernecks". In February 2025, the squadron nickname reverted back to the Werewolves.

=== Move to Yuma and transition to the F-35 ===
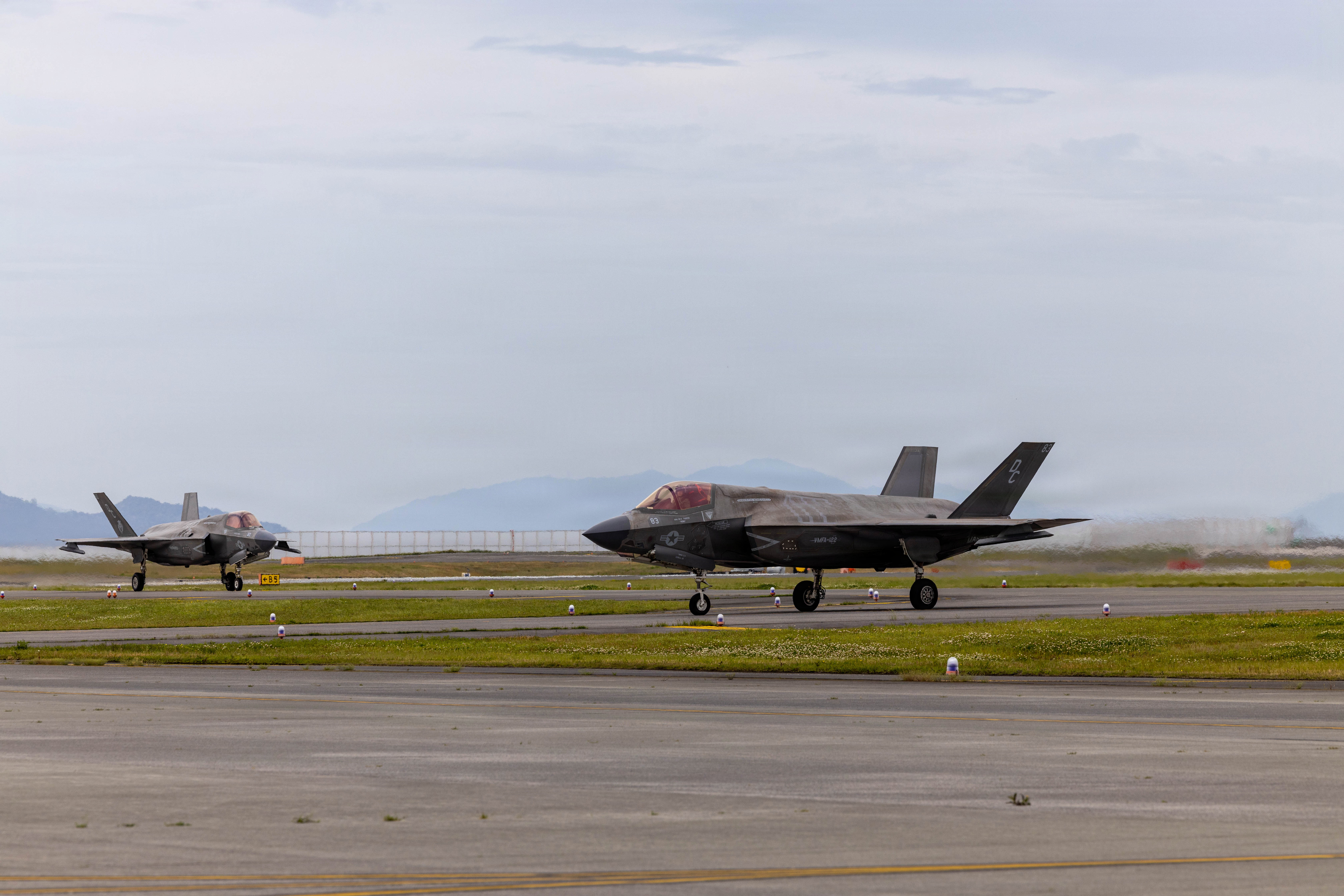
F-35Bs of VMFA-122 at MCAS Iwakuni as part of Unit Deployment Program (UDP), April 2026

On 14 November 2017, VMFA-122 opened a new chapter of their history, transitioning from the McDonnell Douglas F/A-18C Hornet to the Lockheed Martin F-35B Lightning II and moving from MCAS Beaufort and MAG-31, 2nd MAW to MCAS Yuma and MAG-13, 3rd MAW. VMFA-122 moved to MCAS Yuma in October 2017 in preparation for its transition to the F-35Bs. After receiving new personnel and months of training the squadron conducted its first F-35 flight on March 29, 2018.

== Unit awards ==
A unit citation or commendation is an award bestowed upon an organization for the action cited. Members of the unit who participated in said actions are allowed to wear on their uniforms the awarded unit citation. VMFA-122 has been presented with the following awards:

Streamer	Award	Year(s)	Additional Info
	Presidential Unit Citation Streamer	7 August - 9 December 1942	Guadalcanal-Tulagi
	Navy Unit Commendation Streamer	15 September 1944 – 31 January 1945	Peleliu-Western Carolines
	National Defense Service Streamer with three Bronze Stars	1950–1954, 1961–1974, 1990–1995, 2001–present	Korean War, Vietnam War, Gulf War, war on terrorism
	Vietnam Service Streamer		
	Iraq Campaign Streamer		
	Global War on Terrorism Expeditionary Streamer		
	Global War on Terrorism Service Streamer	2001–present	

== See also ==
- United States Marine Corps Aviation
- List of active United States Marine Corps aircraft squadrons
- List of inactive United States Marine Corps aircraft squadrons

== Notes ==
- VMFA-122's official website
