= John Fogg =

American politician

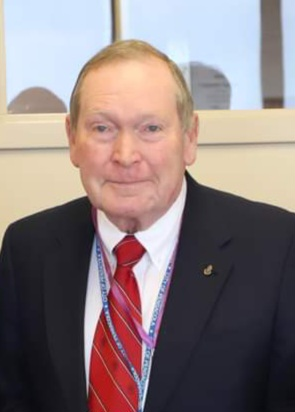
- Fogg in 2022

60th Mayor of Pensacola
- In office 1994–2009
- Preceded by: Jerry Maygarden
- Succeeded by: Mike Wiggins

Personal details
- Born: December 30, 1944 (age 81) Greensburg, Indiana
- Spouse: Patrica Fogg
- Education: Butler University (BA); Troy State University (MPA)
- Profession: Mayor of Pensacola, Marine

John Fogg (born December 30, 1944) is an American politician who served as the mayor of Pensacola, Florida, from 1994 to 2009. Fogg was appointed to the post by the Pensacola City Council in 1994, and reappointed in 1995, 1997, and 1999. In 2001, he became the first elected mayor since 1913.

== Early life and education ==
Fogg has a master's degree in public administration from Troy State University and a Bachelor of Arts degree in psychology from Butler University.

== Career ==
He was a member of the United States Marine Corps and flew 200 combat air missions in Vietnam. He was also awarded 14 Combat Air Medals, a Blue Angels demonstration pilot from 1973 to 1974, "Top Gun" graduate of Navy Fighter Weapons School, the commanding officer of Marine Fighter Attack Squadron VMFA-122, and was awarded the Meritorious Service Medal upon retirement as a lieutenant colonel after 20 years of service.

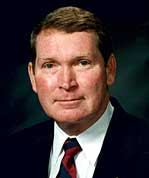
Official portrait, 2006

=== Post-mayoralty life ===
Five years after his mayoral tenure, Fogg published "By the Grace of God," in which he chronicled his near-death experiences in the context of his Christian spiritual growth.

== See also ==
- List of mayors of Pensacola, Florida

Preceded by Jerry Maygarden	Mayor of Pensacola, Florida; 1994-2009	Succeeded by Michael C. Wiggins
