= Ashton Hayward =

American politician

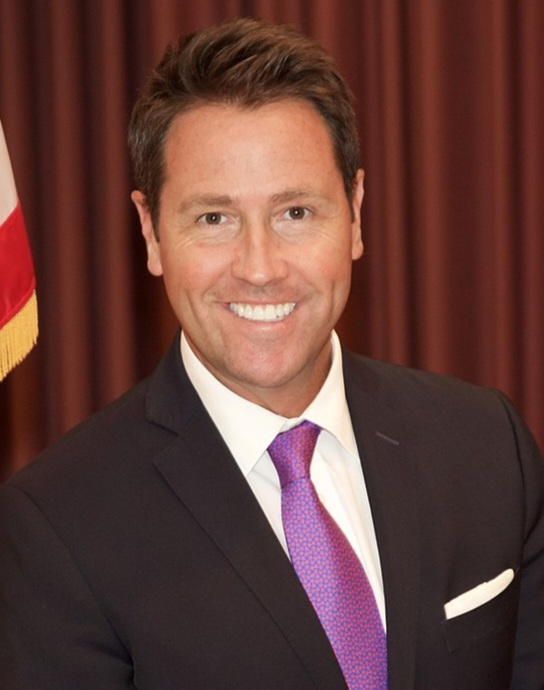
- Hayward in 2015

62nd Mayor of Pensacola
- In office January 10, 2011 – November 27, 2018
- Preceded by: Mike Wiggins
- Succeeded by: Grover Robinson IV

Personal details
- Born: Ashton James Hayward III; April 15, 1969 (age 57) Pensacola, Florida, U.S.
- Party: Republican
- Spouse: Anneken "An" Hayward (m. 1996)
- Children: 1
- Profession: Real estate developer, politician

Ashton James Hayward III (born April 15, 1969) is an American real estate developer and politician who served as the 62nd mayor of Pensacola from 2011 to 2018. He is currently the president of the Andrews Research and Education Foundation. He was the first mayor elected under the "strong mayor" form of government adopted in 2009, which shifted the mayoral duties away from a ceremonial leader to that of the city's chief executive and decision-maker.

== Early life ==
He was born and raised in Pensacola, graduating from Pensacola Catholic High School in 1987. Hayward earned his bachelor's degree at Florida State University. While in college, he took a break from studies in Miami, where he met his future wife, Belgian-born An (married 1996). For many years, Hayward and his wife lived in New York City, returning to Pensacola in 2003 to start a real estate development firm.

== Political career ==
In 2015, Hayward was appointed to the Florida Commission on Community Service by Governor Rick Scott. During his time in office, he also rebranded the City of Pensacola with a new slogan, "Pensacola: The Upside of Florida" which also included stronger economic development efforts.
