= Dave Murzin =

American politician (born 1963)

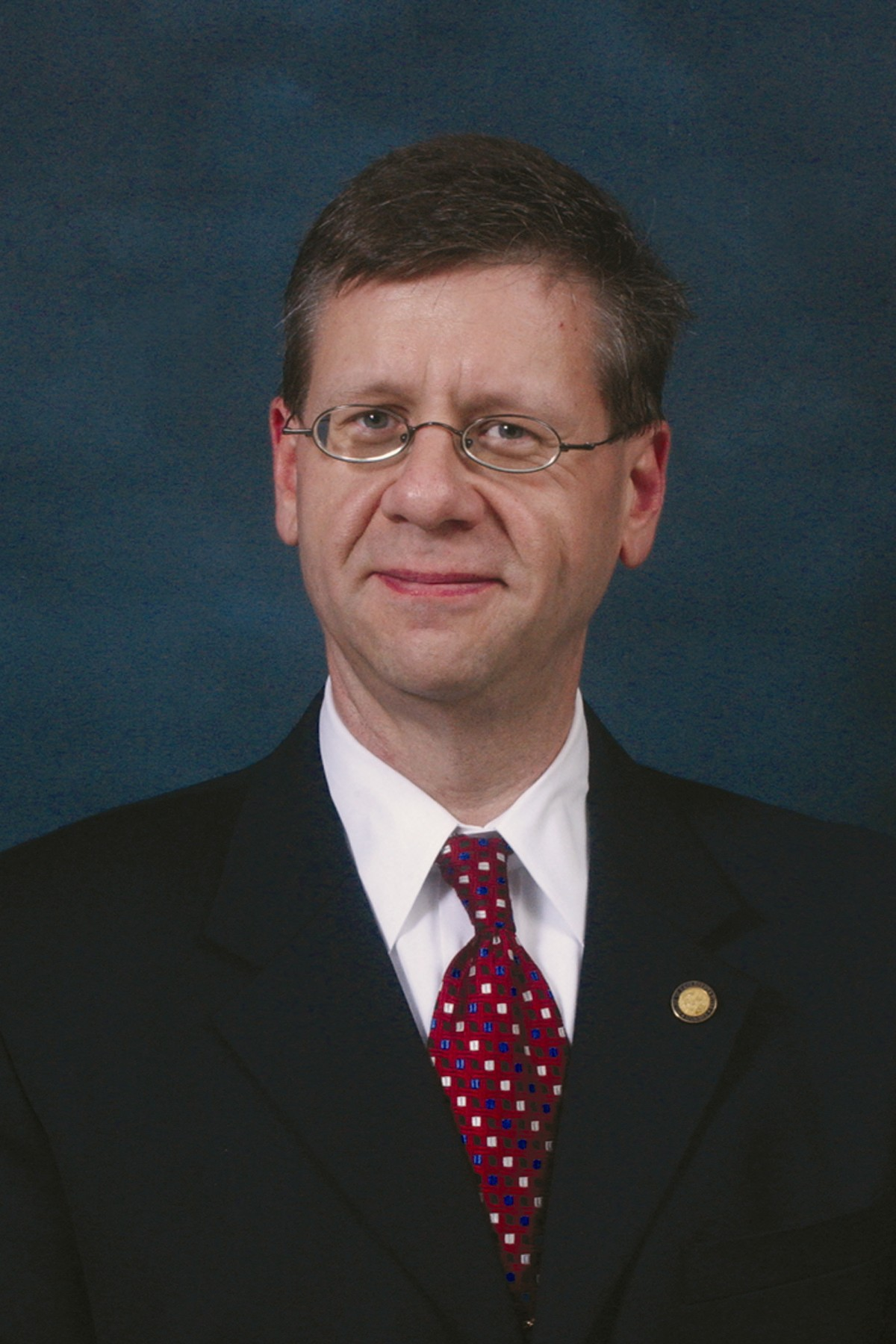

Member of the Florida House of Representatives from the 2nd district
- In office November 5, 2002 – November 2, 2010
- Preceded by: Jerry Maygarden
- Succeeded by: Clay Ingram

Personal details
- Born: December 24, 1963 (age 62) Louisville, Kentucky
- Party: Republican
- Children: 1
- Education: Pensacola Junior College; University of West Florida

Dave Murzin (born December 24, 1963) is a realtor and former Republican member of the Florida House of Representatives. He was born in Louisville, Kentucky.

== Biography ==
Murzin's father, a retired Navy captain and dentist, moved the family to Pensacola in 1978. Dave graduated from Tate High School and received an Associate of Arts Degree from Pensacola Junior College. He also received a bachelor's degree in Political Science with a minor in Economics from the University of West Florida, and began work in educational leadership. He is pursuing a master's degree in Educational Leadership. While working on his bachelor's degree at UWF, Murzin was the Director of the Campus Alcohol and Drug Information Center. He also worked in the Student Activities Office and for the City of Pensacola. He has a son.

Murzin was elected to the State House in the 2nd districted from November 5, 2002, to November 2, 2010, and worked on health care, energy, and tax reform. He is affiliated with the American Legislative Exchange Council's Telecommunications & Information Technology Task Force.
