= Pensacola City Council =

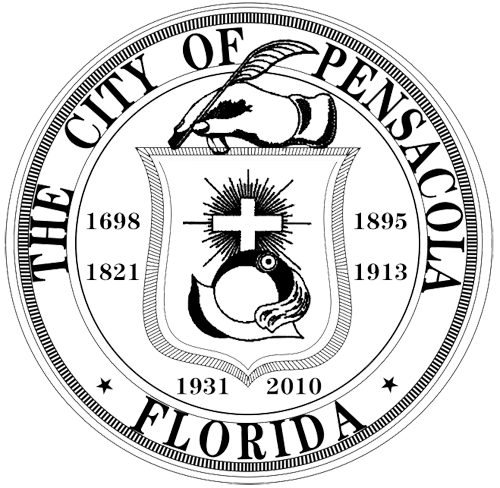

Type
- Type: Unicameral

Leadership
- Council President: Delarian Wiggins since November 2022
- Seats: 7

Elections
- Voting system: Single-member districts

Meeting place
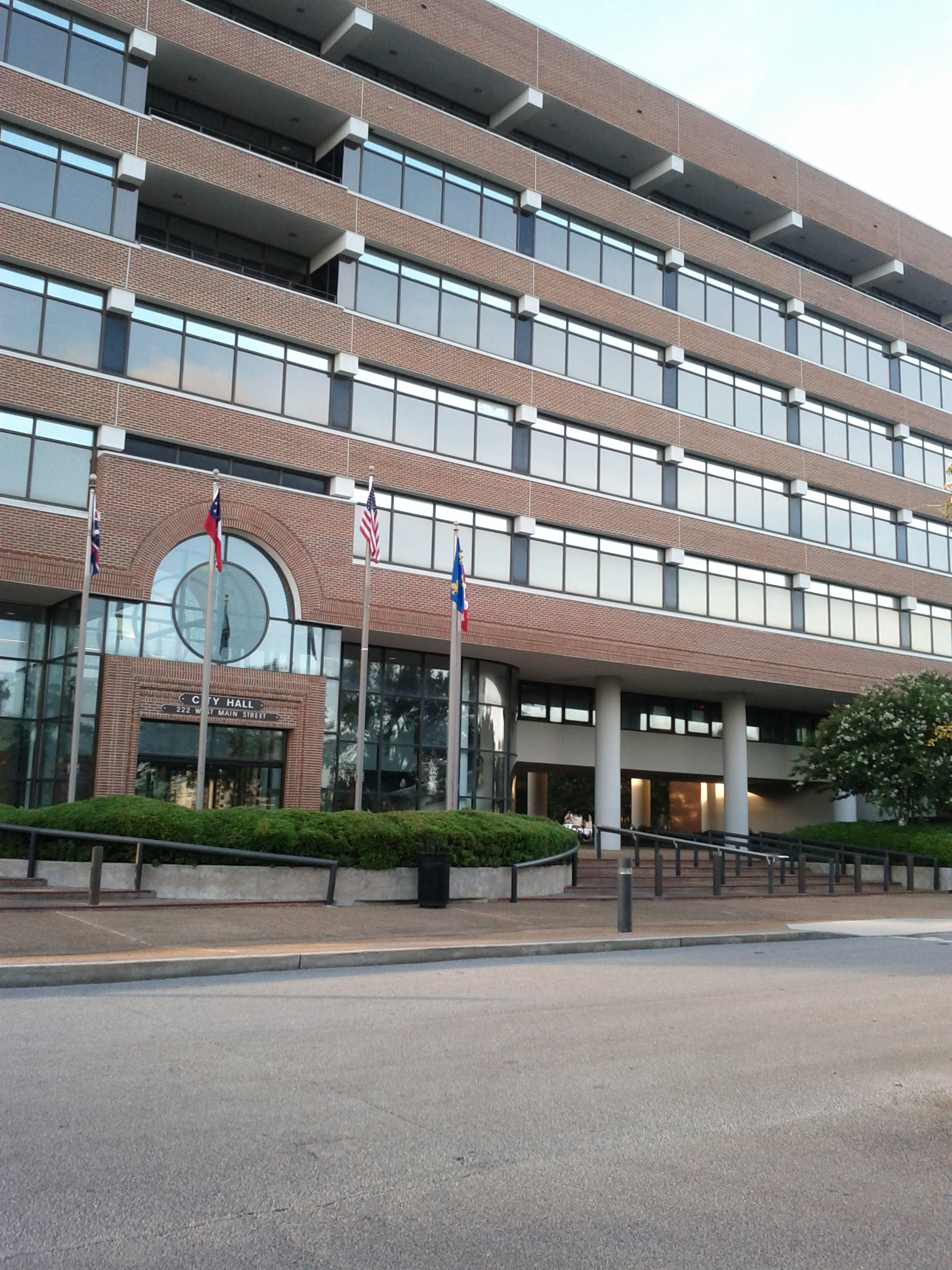
- Pensacola City Hall

Website
- cityofpensacola.com/council

The Pensacola City Council is the governing body of the City of Pensacola, Florida.

The seven-member council is elected by single-member districts. Council members serve four year terms. Each November, the council elects a council president, who chairs council meetings, as well as a council vice-president. The current council president is Jared Moore.

== Members ==
District	Name
Pensacola City Council District 1	Jennifer Brahier
Pensacola City Council District 2	Charles Bare
Pensacola City Council District 3	Casey Jones
Pensacola City Council District 4	Jared Moore
Pensacola City Council District 5	Tenaidé Broughton
Pensacola City Council District 6	Allison Patton
Pensacola City Council District 7	Delarian Wiggins

== See also ==
- Pensacola, Florida
- Pensacola City Hall
