= Mayor of Pensacola =

Political office in the United States

Mayor of the City of Pensacola
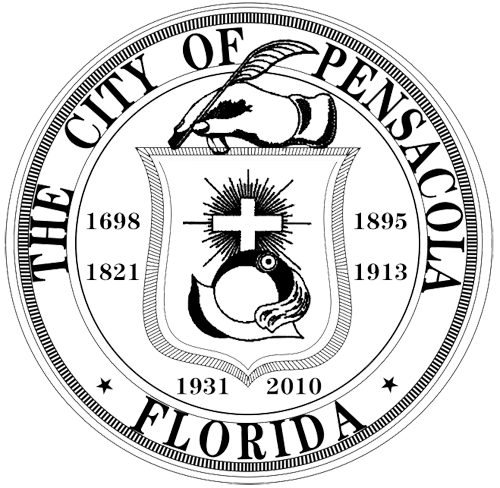
- Seal of Pensacola, Florida

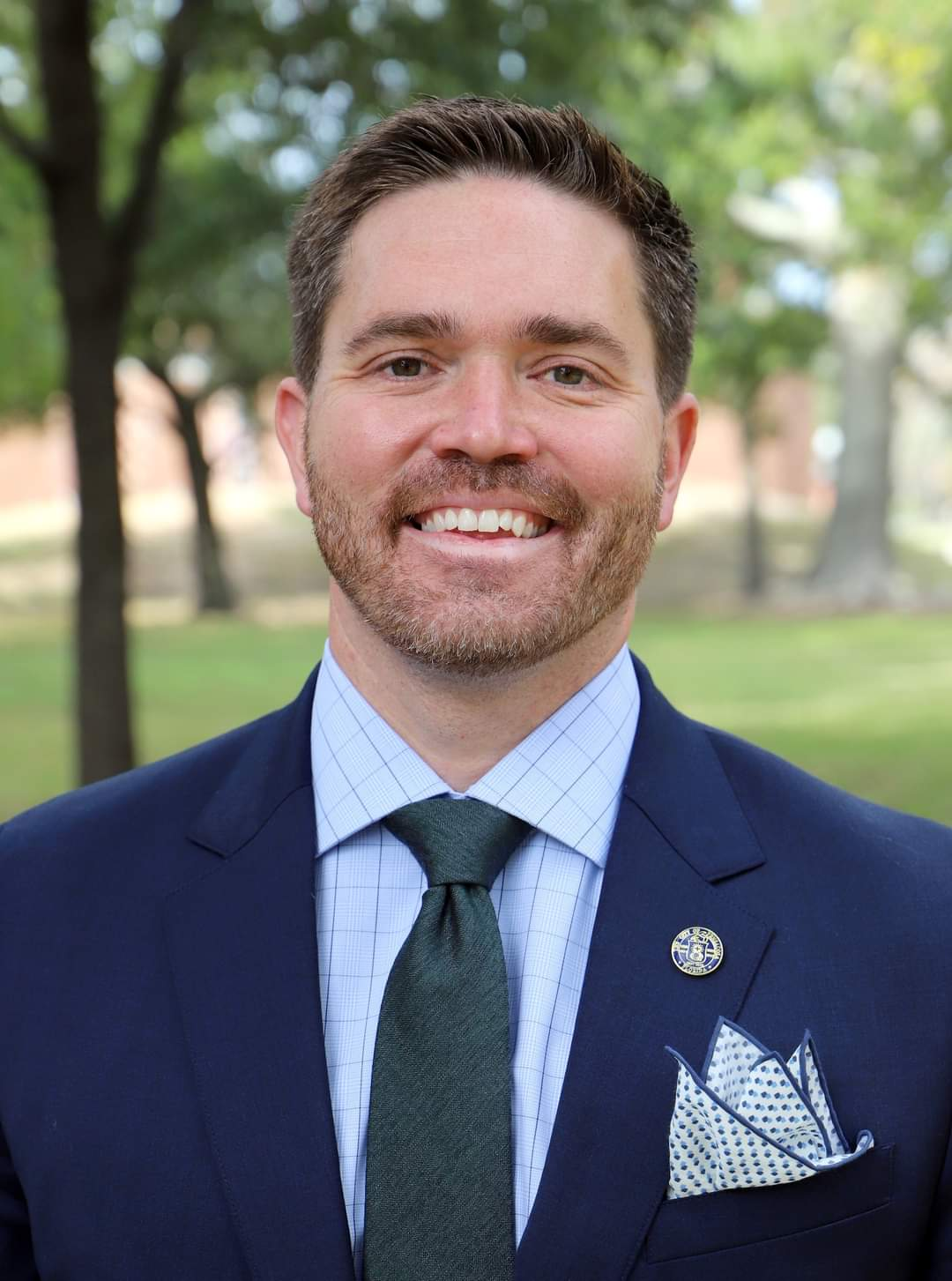
- Incumbent; D. C. Reeves since November 22, 2022
- Term length: 4 years, renewable twice
- Inaugural holder: José Noriega
- Formation: 1820
- Salary: $100,000
- Website: Government website

The mayor of the City of Pensacola is the chief executive officer and holder of the city of Pensacola, Florida. The mayor's office is located at the city hall at 222 West Main Street in Downtown, and owns an estate near the Texar Bayou in East Pensacola.

== Powers and duties ==
In 2009, the duties of the mayor of Pensacola were expanded under the "strong mayor" governing philosophy. Since then, the mayor's duties have shifted from a ceremonial position to the chief decision maker in the city government.

== See also ==
- Pensacola, Florida
- History of Pensacola, Florida
