= National Register of Historic Places listings in Escambia County, Florida =

Location of Escambia County in Florida

This is a list of the National Register of Historic Places listings in Escambia County, Florida.

This is intended to be a complete list of the properties and districts on the National Register of Historic Places in Escambia County, Florida, United States. The locations of National Register properties and districts for which the latitude and longitude coordinates are included below, may be seen in a map.

There are 42 properties and districts listed on the National Register in the county, including 3 National Historic Landmarks. Another 3 properties were once listed but have been removed.

This National Park Service list is complete through NPS recent listings posted March 6, 2026.

Contents: Counties in Florida (non-linked contain no National Register listings)
Alachua - Baker - Bay - Bradford - Brevard - Broward - Calhoun - Charlotte - Citrus - Clay - Collier - Columbia - DeSoto - Dixie - Duval - Escambia - Flagler - Franklin - Gadsden - Gilchrist - Glades - Gulf - Hamilton - Hardee - Hendry - Hernando - Highlands - Hillsborough (Tampa) - Holmes - Indian River - Jackson - Jefferson - Lafayette - Lake - Lee - Leon - Levy - Liberty - Madison - Manatee - Marion - Martin - Miami-Dade (Miami) - Monroe - Nassau - Okaloosa - Okeechobee - Orange - Osceola - Palm Beach - Pasco - Pinellas - Polk - Putnam - St. Johns - St. Lucie - Santa Rosa - Sarasota - Seminole - Sumter - Suwannee - Taylor - Union - Volusia - Wakulla - Walton - Washington

== Current listings ==
	Name on the Register	Image	Date listed	Location	City or town	Description
1	Alger-Sullivan Lumber Company Residential Historic District	Alger-Sullivan Lumber Company Residential Historic District	September 28, 1989 (#89001586)	Roughly bounded by Pinewood Avenue, Front Street, Jefferson Avenue, Church Street, and Mayo Street; 30°58′07″N 87°15′26″W	Century	
2	American National Bank Building	American National Bank Building	November 17, 1978 (#78000940)	226 South Palafox Street; 30°24′34″N 87°12′52″W	Pensacola	
3	Barrancas National Cemetery	Barrancas National Cemetery	February 12, 1998 (#98000083)	80 Hovey Road; 30°21′19″N 87°17′09″W	Pensacola	Part of the Civil War Era National Cemeteries MPS
4	Boy Scout Building	Boy Scout Building	May 29, 2020 (#100005239)	1601 East La Rua St. 30°25′19″N 87°11′45″W	Pensacola	
5	Crystal Ice Company Building	Crystal Ice Company Building	September 29, 1983 (#83001445)	2024 North Davis Street; 30°26′05″N 87°12′46″W	Pensacola	
6	Clara Barkley Dorr House	Clara Barkley Dorr House	July 24, 1974 (#74000619)	311 South Adams Street; 30°24′32″N 87°12′38″W	Pensacola	
7	John Edmunds Apartment House	John Edmunds Apartment House	September 29, 1983 (#83001444)	2007 East Gadsden Street; 30°25′31″N 87°11′24″W	Pensacola	
8	Emanuel Point Shipwreck Site		March 4, 1996 (#96000227)	Address Restricted	Pensacola	
9	First Christian Church	First Christian Church	April 14, 1994 (#94000350)	619 East Gadsden Street, at the junction of 7th Avenue and Gadsden; 30°25′17″N 87°12′33″W	Pensacola	
10	Fort Barrancas Historical District	Fort Barrancas Historical District	October 15, 1966 (#66000263)	Naval Air Station Pensacola; 30°21′05″N 87°17′53″W	Pensacola	
11	Fort George Site	Fort George Site	July 8, 1974 (#74000620)	La Rua at Palafox Street; 30°25′07″N 87°13′02″W	Pensacola	
12	Fort Pickens	Fort Pickens	May 31, 1972 (#72000096)	State Road 399 west of Pensacola Beach; 30°19′20″N 87°16′36″W	Pensacola Beach	
13	Hickory Ridge Cemetery Archeological Site		September 22, 2000 (#00001131)	Address Restricted	Pensacola	
14	Hyer-Knowles Planing Mill Chimney	Hyer-Knowles Planing Mill Chimney	May 24, 2012 (#12000299)	Junction of Scenic Bluffs Highway and Langley Ave. 30°28′50″N 87°09′45″W	Pensacola	
15	James House	James House	December 13, 2000 (#00001501)	1606 North Martin Luther King Boulevard; 30°25′55″N 87°12′49″W	Pensacola	
16	Charles William Jones House	Charles William Jones House	December 20, 1977 (#77000403)	302 North Barcelona Street; 30°24′58″N 87°13′12″W	Pensacola	
17	King-Hooton House	King-Hooton House	August 23, 1991 (#91001090)	512-514 North 7th Avenue; 30°25′13″N 87°12′31″W	Pensacola	
18	L & N Marine Terminal Building	L & N Marine Terminal Building	August 14, 1972 (#72000315)	Commendencia Street Wharf; 30°24′28″N 87°12′41″W	Pensacola	
19	Lavalle House	Lavalle House	March 11, 1971 (#71000237)	203 East Church Street; 30°24′32″N 87°12′44″W	Pensacola	
20	Louisville and Nashville Passenger Station and Express Building	Louisville and Nashville Passenger Station and Express Building	June 11, 1979 (#79000670)	239 North Alcaniz Street; 30°25′02″N 87°12′36″W	Pensacola	
21	Marzoni House	Marzoni House	May 10, 2016 (#16000245)	714 La Rua St. 30°25′13″N 87°12′29″W	Pensacola	
22	Motor Inn Number 2	Motor Inn Number 2	September 27, 2022 (#100008234)	500 West Jackson St. 30°25′07″N 87°13′25″W	Pensacola	
23	Mount Zion Missionary Baptist Church	Mount Zion Missionary Baptist Church	December 24, 2013 (#13000963)	528 West Jackson Street; 30°25′05″N 87°13′28″W	Pensacola	
24	North Hill Preservation District	North Hill Preservation District	May 9, 1983 (#83001422)	Roughly bounded by Blount, Palafox, Wright, Belmont, Reus, and DeVilliers Streets; 30°25′14″N 87°13′14″W	Pensacola	
25	Old Christ Church	Old Christ Church	May 3, 1974 (#74000621)	405 South Adams Street; 30°24′33″N 87°12′38″W	Pensacola	
26	Palafox Historic District	Palafox Historic District	April 27, 2016 (#14001085)	Palafox St. between Main & Chase extending to Spring; 30°24′37″N 87°12′53″W	Pensacola	
27	Pensacola Harbor Defense Project	Pensacola Harbor Defense Project	May 15, 2017 (#100000992)	W. end of Santa Rosa Island; 30°19′27″N 87°16′40″W	Pensacola	
28	Pensacola Historic District	Pensacola Historic District	September 29, 1970 (#70000184)	Address Unknown; 30°24′38″N 87°12′36″W	Pensacola	
29	Pensacola Hospital	Pensacola Hospital	February 16, 1982 (#82002373)	North 12th Avenue; 30°25′34″N 87°12′10″W	Pensacola	
30	Pensacola Lighthouse and Keeper's Quarters	Pensacola Lighthouse and Keeper's Quarters	July 15, 1974 (#74000622)	Naval Air Station Pensacola; 30°20′44″N 87°18′29″W	Pensacola	
31	Pensacola Naval Air Station Historic District	Pensacola Naval Air Station Historic District	December 8, 1976 (#76000595)	Naval Air Station Pensacola; 30°20′47″N 87°16′09″W	Pensacola	
32	Perdido Key Historic District	Perdido Key Historic District	March 10, 1980 (#80000404)	South of Warrington; 30°19′32″N 87°19′34″W	Warrington	
33	Plaza Ferdinand VII	Plaza Ferdinand VII	October 15, 1966 (#66000264)	Palafox Street between Government and Zaragossa Streets; 30°24′33″N 87°12′50″W	Pensacola	
34	Sacred Heart Catholic Church	Sacred Heart Catholic Church	December 10, 2008 (#08001161)	716 North 9th Avenue; 30°25′13″N 87°12′23″W	Pensacola	
35	Saenger Theatre	Saenger Theatre	July 19, 1976 (#76000596)	118 South Palafox Street; 30°24′37″N 87°12′53″W	Pensacola	
36	St. Joseph's Church Buildings	St. Joseph's Church Buildings	July 10, 1979 (#79000671)	140 West Government Street; 30°24′33″N 87°13′05″W	Pensacola	
37	St. Michael's Creole Benevolent Association Hall	St. Michael's Creole Benevolent Association Hall	May 3, 1974 (#74000623)	416 East Government Street; 30°24′37″N 87°12′33″W	Pensacola	
38	Thiesen Building	Thiesen Building	December 13, 1979 (#79000672)	40 South Palafox Street; 30°24′32″N 87°12′38″W	Pensacola	
39	United States Post Office and Court House	United States Post Office and Court House	July 11, 2014 (#14000389)	100 N. Palafox St. 30°24′52″N 87°12′56″W	Pensacola	
40	US Customs House and Post Office	US Customs House and Post Office	July 22, 1997 (#97000659)	223 Palafox Place; 30°24′34″N 87°12′54″W	Pensacola	
41	USS MASSACHUSETTS-BB-2 (shipwreck)	USS MASSACHUSETTS-BB-2 (shipwreck)	May 31, 2001 (#01000528)	1-mile (1.6 km) south-southwest of Pensacola Pass; 30°17′45″N 87°18′45″W	Pensacola	
42	P.K. Yonge House	P.K. Yonge House	October 16, 2018 (#100003019)	1924 E Jackson St. 30°25′26″N 87°11′27″W	Pensacola	

== Former listings ==
	Name on the Register	Image	Date listed	Date removed	Location	City or town	Description
1	Buccaneer	Buccaneer	November 2, 1972 (#72000313)	February 17, 1988	Municipal Wharf	Pensacola	Also known as the Virginia. Sank on August 10, 1977.
2	Pensacola Athletic Club		April 16, 1975 (#75000552)	October 10, 1990	SW corner of Baylen and Belmont Sts.	Pensacola	Also known as Rafford Hall. Destroyed by arsonist in 1990.
3	San Carlos Hotel	San Carlos Hotel	January 20, 1982 (#82002374)	February 4, 1994	1 N Palafox St.	Pensacola	Demolished in 1993

== See also ==
- List of National Historic Landmarks in Florida
- National Register of Historic Places listings in Florida
