= Julee Cottage =

Historic home in Pensacola, Florida, US

Coordinates: 30.409025°N 87.211085°W

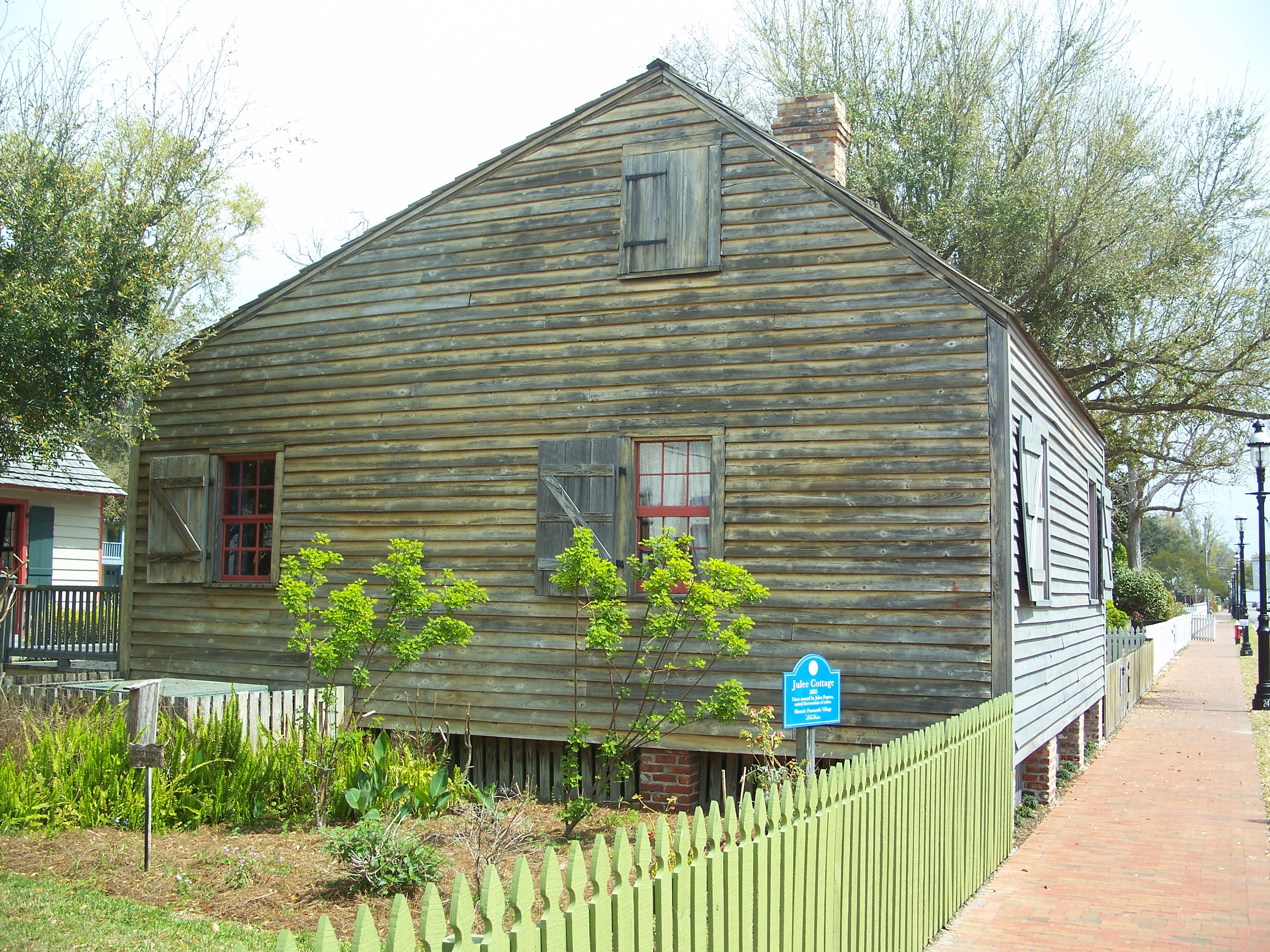
Julee Cottage, built c. 1805

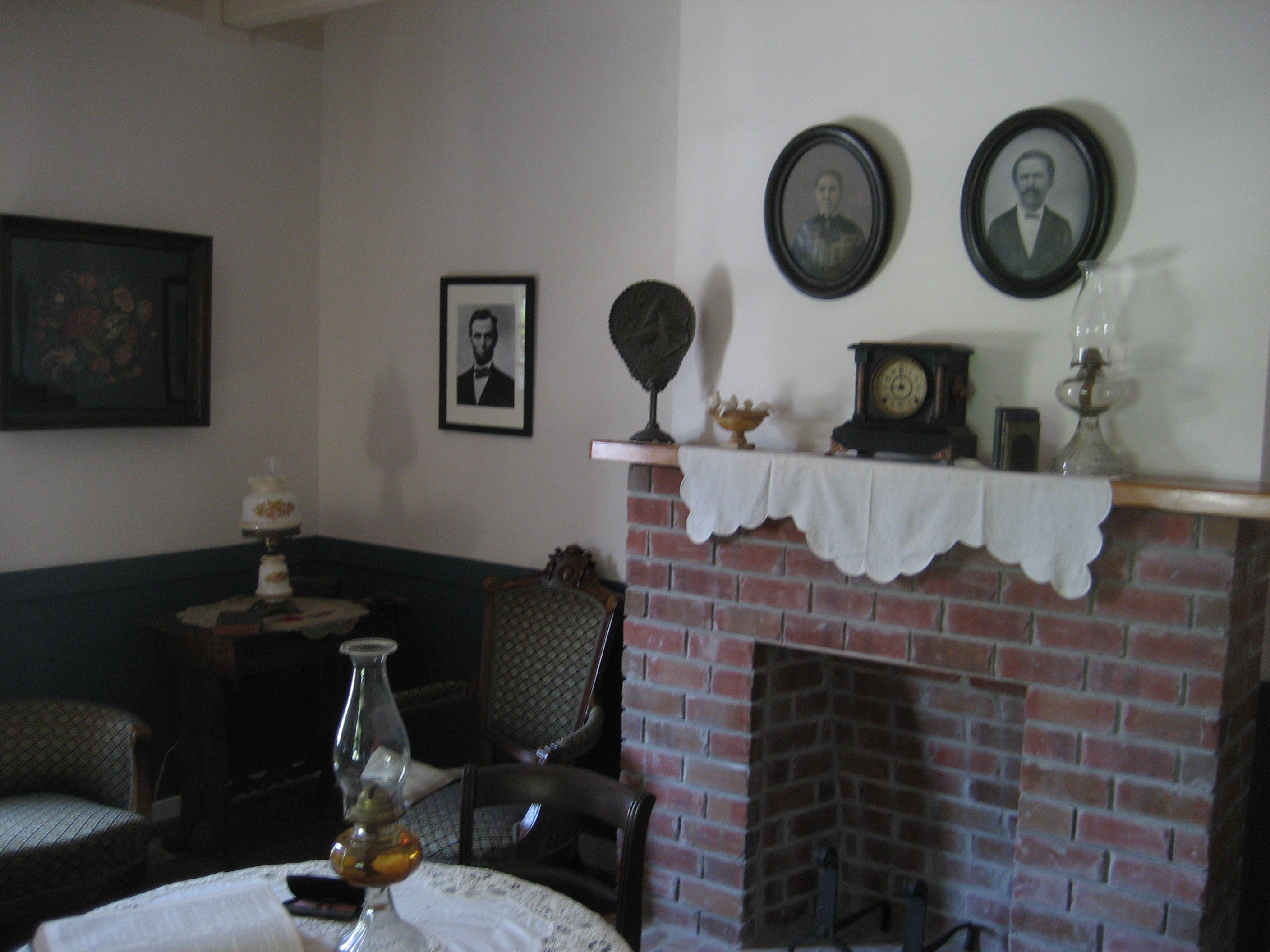
Interior of the Julee Cottage (2008) fireplace

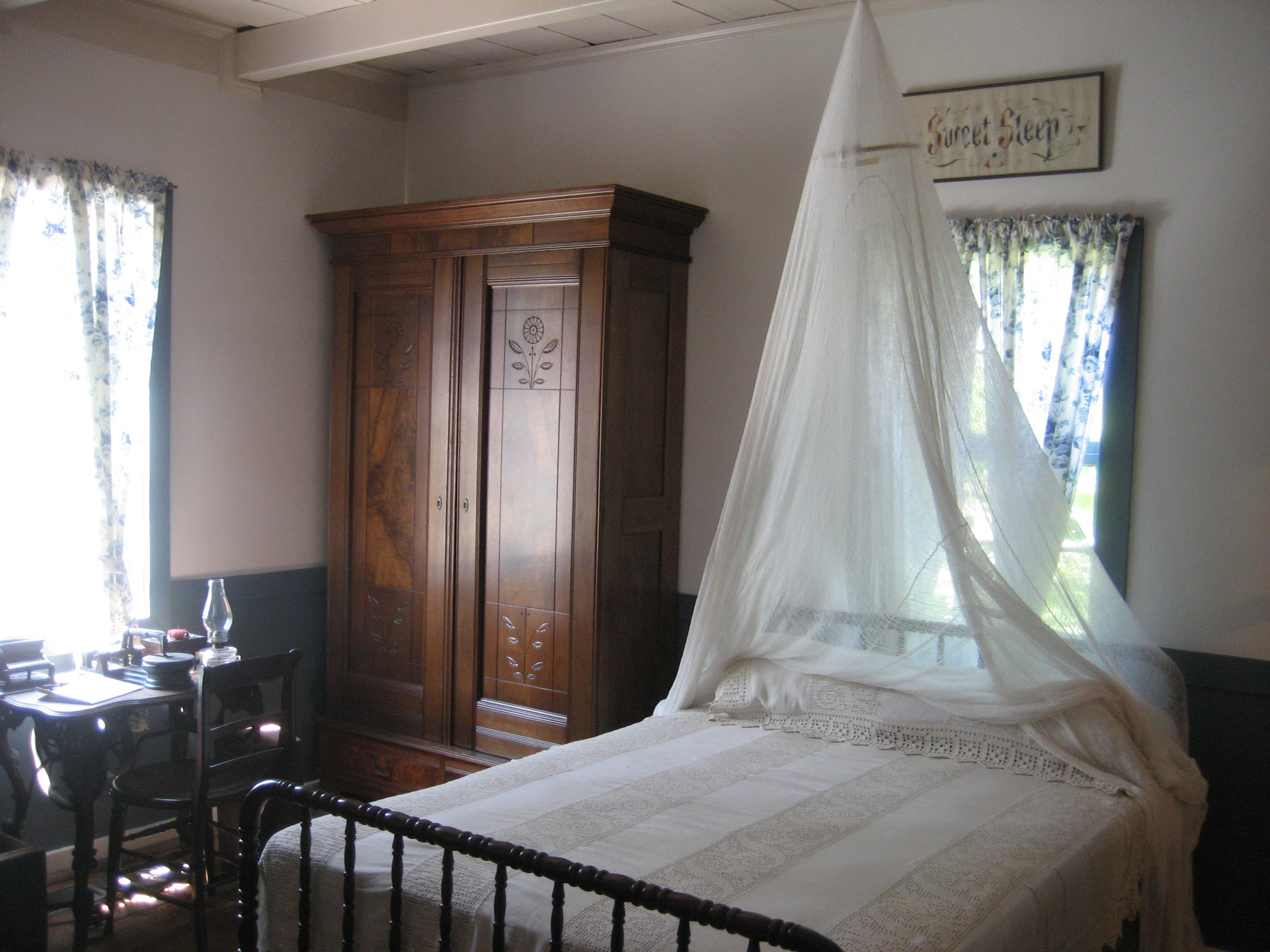
Interior of the Julee Cottage (2008) bedroom

Julee Cottage is an historic home built in c. 1805 and located in the Historic Pensacola Village (within the Pensacola Historic District) at 210 East Zaragoza Street in Pensacola, Florida, U.S.. The building serves as the home of the Black History Museum of West Florida (or Center for Black Heritage).

Pensacola Historic District is registered in the United States National Register of Historic Places since September 29, 1970.

== History ==
The Julee Cottage was built in Pensacola from cypress wood between 1804 and 1808 (although some sources date it as early as 1790). The building has a tin roof and has a platform frame construction, similar to architecture of the Creole cottages in Louisiana.

One of the building's earliest owners was Julee Panton, a free woman of color. She lived among a community of freedmen and sold baked goods and candles. According to legend, she purchased the freedom of enslaved African Americans. The cottage was sold to another freedwoman named Angelica and was later passed on to other black families.

The cottage has been relocated from its original site in order to preserve it, and it has a historical marker. It is stop number 2 on the Pensacola African American Heritage Trail hosted by the African American Heritage Society. Images of the structure exist in archives including in the State Archives of Florida. The Black History Museum of West Florida (or Center for Black Heritage) hosts an exhibition of old documents and photographs to tell the story of Black life in Pensacola in the 19th century.

Other notable homes in the Pensacola Historic District include the Dorr House, and the Lavalle House.

== See also ==
- National Register of Historic Places listings in Escambia County, Florida
