= John Edmond (disambiguation) =

John Edmond (born 1936) is a Rhodesian folk singer.

John Edmond or Edmund may also refer to:

- John M. Edmond (1943–2001), professor of marine geochemistry and oceanography
- Johnny Edmond (born 1969), footballer
- John ab Edmund, Welsh politician
- John Edmund (theatre) (1924–2003), stage director in Australia

== See also ==
- John Edmonds (disambiguation)
- John Edmunds (disambiguation)
- John Edmondson (disambiguation)
