= John Edmonds =

John Edmonds may refer to:

== Politics ==
- John Edmonds (died 1544), MP for Maldon
- John Edmonds (died 1606), MP for Cambridge
- John W. Edmonds (1799–1874), American lawyer and politician in New York
- John Edmonds (Kansas politician) (born 1951), American politician

== Others ==
- John Edmonds (artist) (born 1989)
- John Edmonds (trade unionist) (born 1944), British former trade union official
- Jack Edmonds (born 1934), mathematician
- John Samuel Edmonds (1799–1865), New Zealand missionary, trader, stonemason and founding father
- John Maxwell Edmonds (1875–1958), classicist

== See also ==
- John Edmands (disambiguation)
- John Edmond (disambiguation)
- John Edmondson (disambiguation)
- John Edmunds (disambiguation)
