= John Edmunds =

John Edmunds may refer to:

- John Edmunds (English academic) (died 1544), vice-chancellor of Cambridge University
- John R. Edmunds (1812–1873), American politician, member of the Virginia House of Delegates
- John Edmunds (presenter) (1929–2023), BBC presenter and professor of drama
- John Edmunds (epidemiologist), British epidemiologist
- John C. Edmunds, professor of finance, Boston, Massachusetts
- John Edmunds Apartment House, historic house in Florida

== See also ==
- John Edmands (disambiguation)
- John Edmonds (disambiguation)
- John Edmund (disambiguation)
