= Palafox Historic District =

Historic district in Florida, United States

- U.S. National Register of Historic Places
- U.S. Historic district
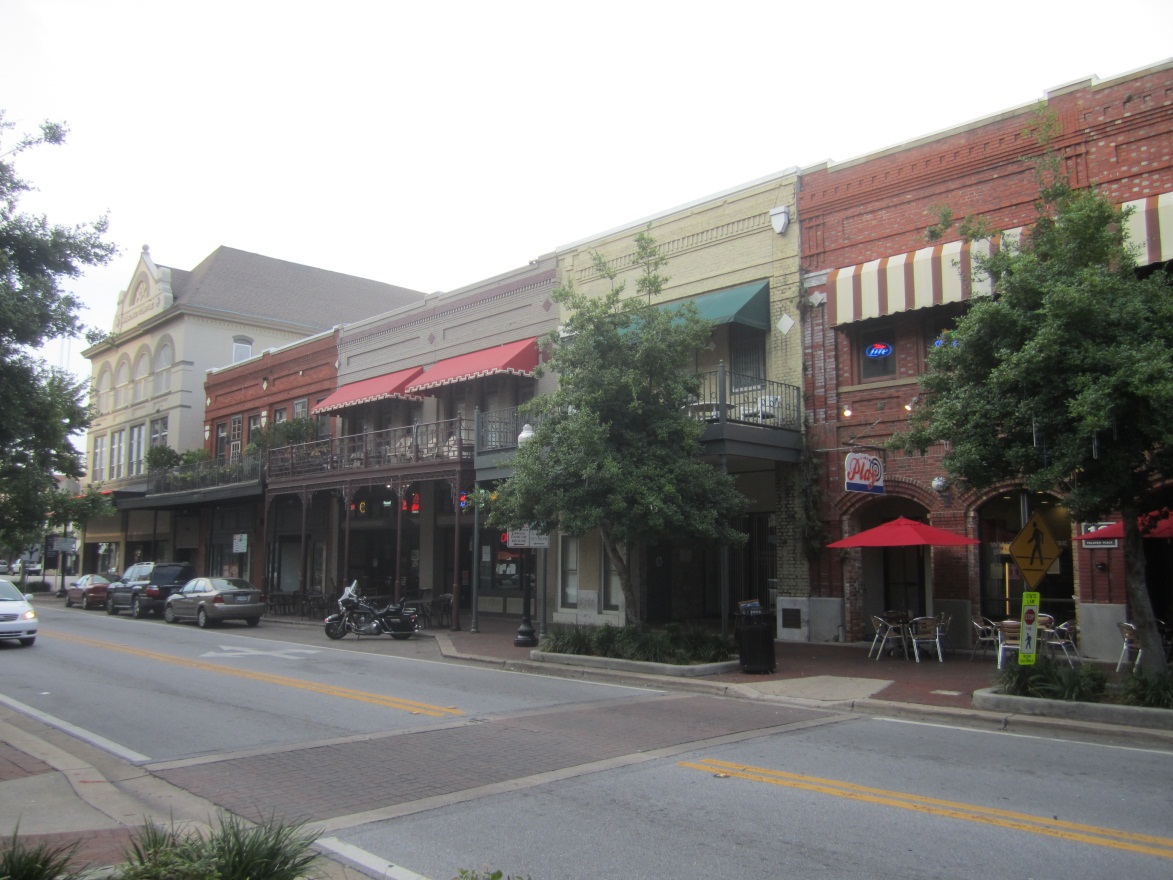
- East side of Palafox St. in 2012

- Location within Florida Location within the United States
- Interactive map showing the location of Palafox Historic District
- Location: Palafox St. between Main & Chase extending to Spring, Pensacola, Florida
- Coordinates: 30°24′37″N 87°12′53″W
- Area: 176 acres (71 ha)
- Built: 1880
- Architect: James E.R. Carpenter, Emile Weil
- Architectural style: Multiple
- NRHP reference No.: 14001085
- Added to NRHP: April 27, 2016

The Palafox Historic District (NR 14001085) comprises 129 properties in Pensacola, Florida. The district includes 100 contributing buildings, 28 non-contributing buildings, and 1 non-contributing site (Martin Luther King, Jr. Plaza – due to age of site at time of the nomination). The National Register district, listed under the category Commerce/Trade, runs along Palafox Street and is bounded roughly on the north by Chase Street, on the south by Main Street, and extends to Spring Street on the west. The Palafox Historic District joins 38 other National Register of Historic Places listings in Escambia County, Florida.

== National Register of Historic Places ==
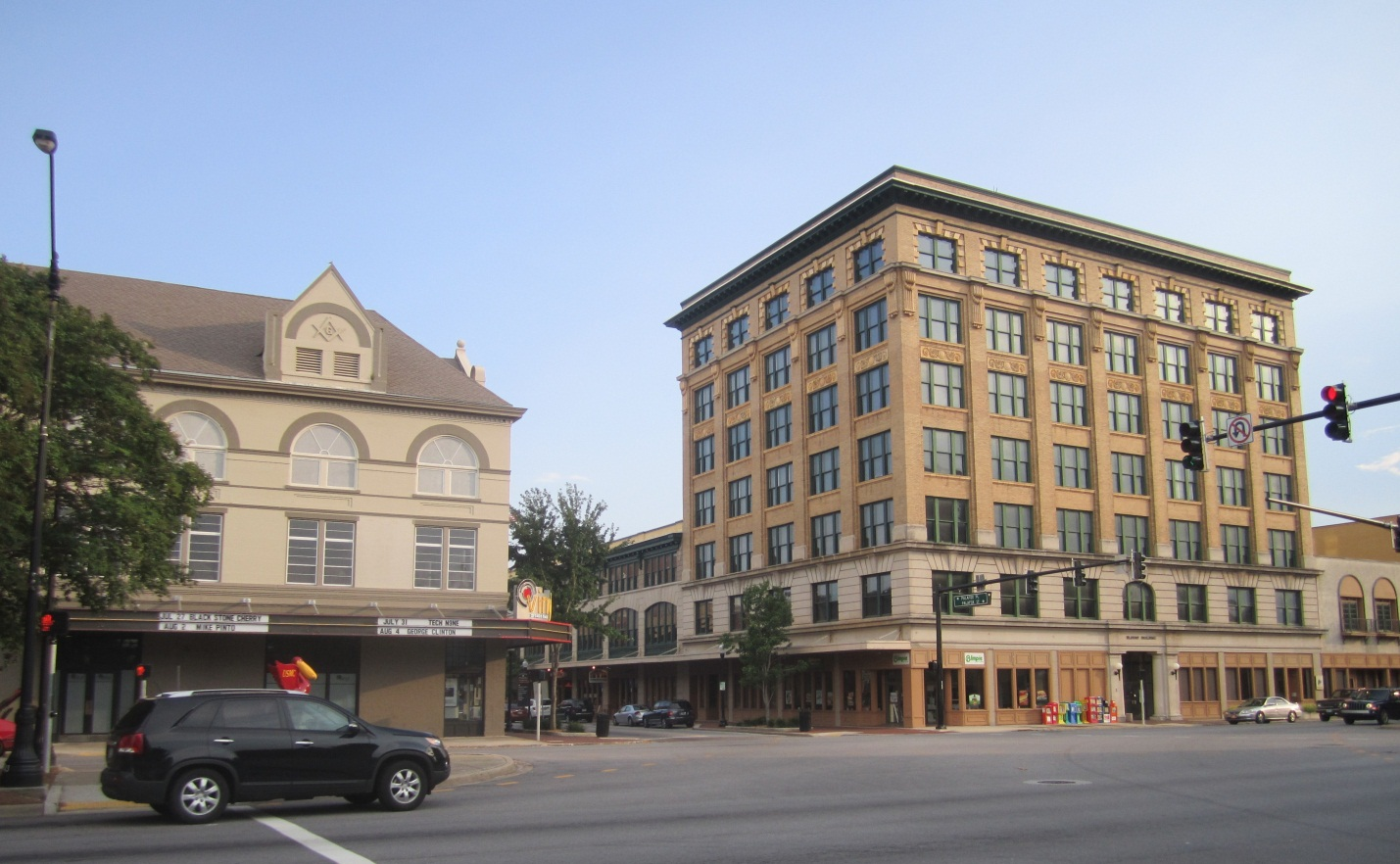
Intersection of Palafox and Garden Streets. Palafox Historic District, Pensacola, Florida

The National Register of Historic Places is the official list of the Nation's historic places worthy of preservation. Authorized by the National Historic Preservation Act of 1966, the National Park Service's National Register of Historic Places is part of a national program to coordinate and support public and private efforts to identify, evaluate, and protect America's historic and archaeological resources.

== Historical context ==
Pensacola, Florida is the site of North America's first European colony. In 1559, 1,500 people on the eleven ships of the Spanish Don Tristán de Luna y Arellano expedition carried provisions to establish a foothold in North America. The ships were loaded with food, livestock, Indigenous people, priests, and women; supplies intended to sustain a settlement. After a strong hurricane destroyed most of the ships and supplies, the colony lingered for only two years before returning to Mexico.

Over a period of nearly five hundred years Spain, Great Britain, France, United States, and the Confederate States of America have called this place home. The city's infrastructure and architecture reflect a multicultural patina.

=== Pensacola on the National Register of Historic Places ===
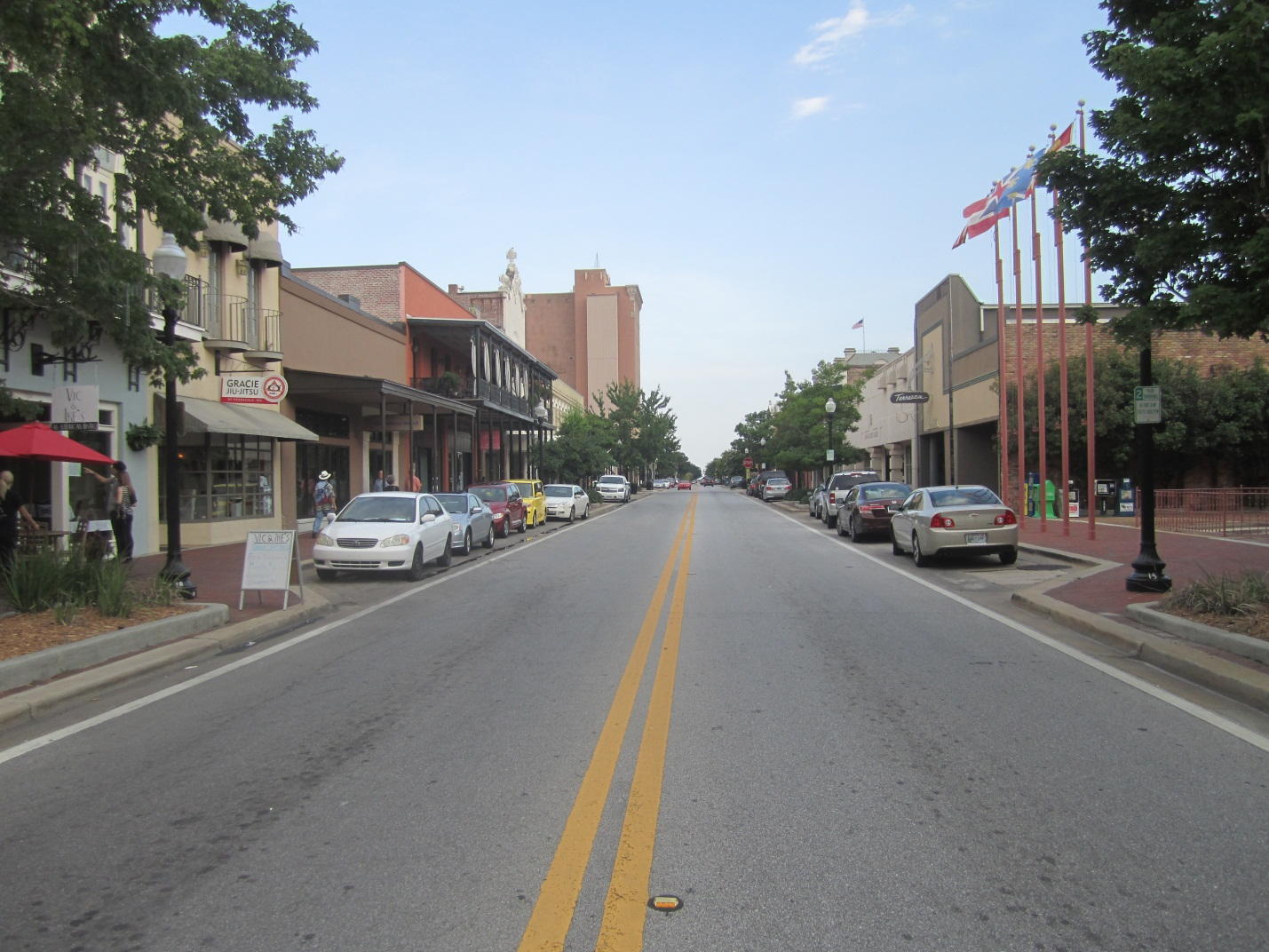
Palafox Historic District Pensacola, Florida USA. On the National Register of Historic Places

Shortly after the establishment of the National Historic Preservation Act in 1966, the city assembled a team to take advantage of grants and tax incentives. Aided in part by State House Bill 163, which established the Pensacola Historic Restoration and Preservation Commission and $200,000 in funding, the team conducted historic research, surveys, and documentation. Resulting from this effort in 1970 was Pensacola's first National Register district (NR 70000184). Unfortunately, reviewers rejected most of the properties in the downtown business district for historic designation due to dereliction and insensitive renovations.

=== Palafox Historic District on the National Register of Historic Places ===
In 2011, the city of Pensacola contracted with Cynthia Catellier to write a National Register of Historic Places nomination for Pensacola's downtown business district. Over the next few years, Catellier conducted a historic district survey, researched, documented, photographed, and wrote the narrative for the Palafox Historic District. On September 4, 2014, she presented over 100 pages of documentation and photographs to the Florida National Register Review Board, which unanimously voted to send the nomination to Washington, D.C. for approval.

On April 27, 2016, the Secretary of the Interior placed the Palafox Historic District on the National Register of Historic Places (NR 14001085). A month later, the National Park Service showcased the Palafox Historic District on its Featured Places page.

== See also ==
- National Register of Historic Places listings in Escambia County, Florida
