= Lucia Tryon =

Librarian from Pensacola, Florida

Lucia M. Tryon
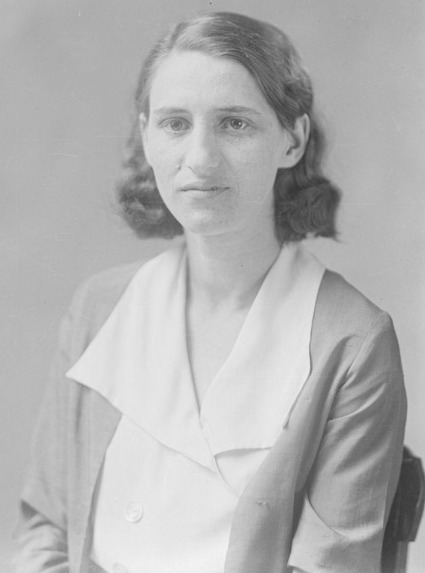
- Born: November 22, 1903; Maumee, Ohio
- Died: November 30, 2000 (aged 97); Pensacola, Florida
- Education: Emory University (BA)
- Occupation: Librarian
- Years active: 1938–1968
- Employer: Pensacola Public Library
- Title: Chief Librarian

Lucia Madeline Tryon (November 22, 1903 – November 30, 2000) was an American librarian, who led the formation of the first public library in the city of Pensacola.

== Career ==
=== School librarian ===
After earning a library science degree from Emory University, she became the head librarian at Miami Edison High School.

=== Pensacola public library service ===
==== Formation ====
Tryon was later hired by the city of Pensacola to convert the Old Christ Church in historic Seville Square into the city’s first public library. On February 15th, 1938, the library opened its doors. And with a budget of only one hundred dollars, they began with 3,352 books.

==== Development ====
During her time at the helm of Pensacola’s free library system, Tryon guided it through many changes, including the construction of (and move to) the main library’s current building on Gregory Street in 1957, and an expansion of that building ten years later.

She oversaw the establishment of the Alice S. Williams Branch Library to serve the city’s Black community during the time of racial segregation. This branch ultimately merged with their downtown branch, the Pensacola Public Library.

Tryon was particularly proud of initiating the system’s first Bookmobile program in 1963, which made the library's resources more accessible to residents in outlying rural areas. After her thirty years of service, the library had grown twenty times its size.

==== Retirement ====
On her 65th birthday in 1968, Tryon was forced to retire from her position as chief librarian and described the memory to colleagues as, “the saddest day of her life.” She continued involvement with the library as a member of the Friends of the Pensacola Public Library as long as her health would allow. She died on November 30, 2000 at the age of 97.

== Recognition ==
In 1990, the system’s Northeast Branch Library was renamed in her honor the Lucia M. Tryon Branch Library.
