= Episcopal Day School =

Episcopal Day School may refer to:

- Episcopal Day School (Augusta, Georgia)
- Episcopal Day School (Pensacola, Florida)
- Episcopal Day School (Tennessee)
- Advent Episcopal Day School
- All Saint's Episcopal Day School
- Holy Trinity Episcopal Day School
- St. Francis Episcopal Day School (Texas)
- St. Patrick's Episcopal Day School
- St. Paul's Episcopal Day School
- Trinity Episcopal Day School
