= Museum of Industry (Pensacola, Florida) =

Industry museum in Pensacola, Florida

Historic Pensacola's Museum of Industry
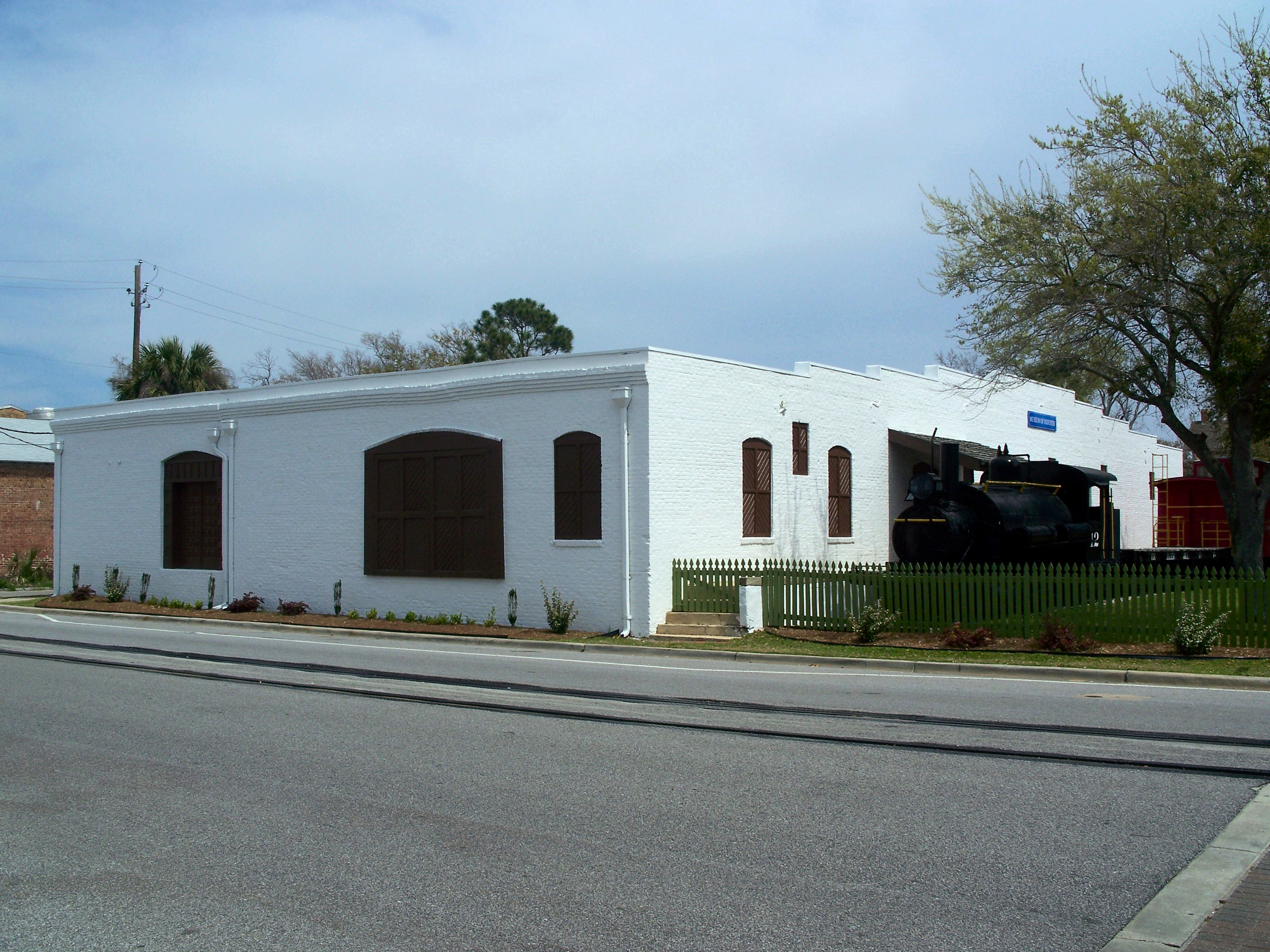

- Location within Florida
- Location: Pensacola, Florida
- Coordinates: 30.40902°N 87.21166°W
- Website: www.historicpensacola.org

The Museum of Industry is part of the Historic Pensacola Village complex in the Pensacola Historic District. It describes in detail the main industries of early Pensacola: fishing/ice, clay/brickmaking, lumber, and transportation.

== The Building ==
Built in 1884 for the Pensacola Ice Company, the "Hispanic Building" was a long narrow brick structure with six arches facing Zaragoza Street. Earlier structures at this site served as British and Spanish barracks, a boarding house and, in the 1830s the home of the West Florida Academy. The present building has housed the New Orleans Grocery Company, the Levy-Hallmark Company and the Pensacola-Lurton Company, which leased it to the county for a surplus warehouse. It was acquired by the city in 1968 and is now an integral part of the Historic Pensacola Village.

== Early Pensacola Industries ==
This is a summary of the museum contents.

=== Timber ===
Pensacola was a thickly wooded area, and the trees provided with lumber and lumber products (e.g., turpentine). Much of the equipment involved in processing timber is displayed on the west end of the building.

=== Brickmaking ===
Pensacola residents produced an amazing number of bricks. Many bricks from Pensacola can be found in the several forts in the area. The museum has a portion of a kiln in the southeast corner.

=== Fishing ===
Fish were plentiful in early Pensacola, and the Museum of Industry houses an old boat from that era.

=== Railroad ===
Pensacola's deepwater port was excellent for transporting goods from sea to land. There is a port downtown to this day, although it is nowhere as busy as it was then.
