= John Edmands =

John Edmands may refer to:

- John Edmands (librarian) (1820–1915), American
- J. Wiley Edmands, U.S. Representative

== See also ==
- John Edmunds (disambiguation)
- John Edmonds (disambiguation)
