= John Edmondson =

John Edmondson may refer to:

- John Edmondson, 2nd Baron Sandford (1920–2009), Royal Navy officer, clergyman, conservationist and Conservative politician
- John Edmondson (musician) (1933–2016), American trumpeter, pianist and teacher
- John Edmondson (soldier) (1914–1941), Australian recipient of the Victoria Cross
- John Edmondson Whittaker (1897–1945), British Labour Party politician
- John Edmondson (footballer) (1882–?), English footballer

== See also ==
- John Edmond (disambiguation)
- John Edmonds (disambiguation)
