= Old Christ Church (Pensacola, Florida) =

Historic church in Florida, United States

- U.S. National Register of Historic Places
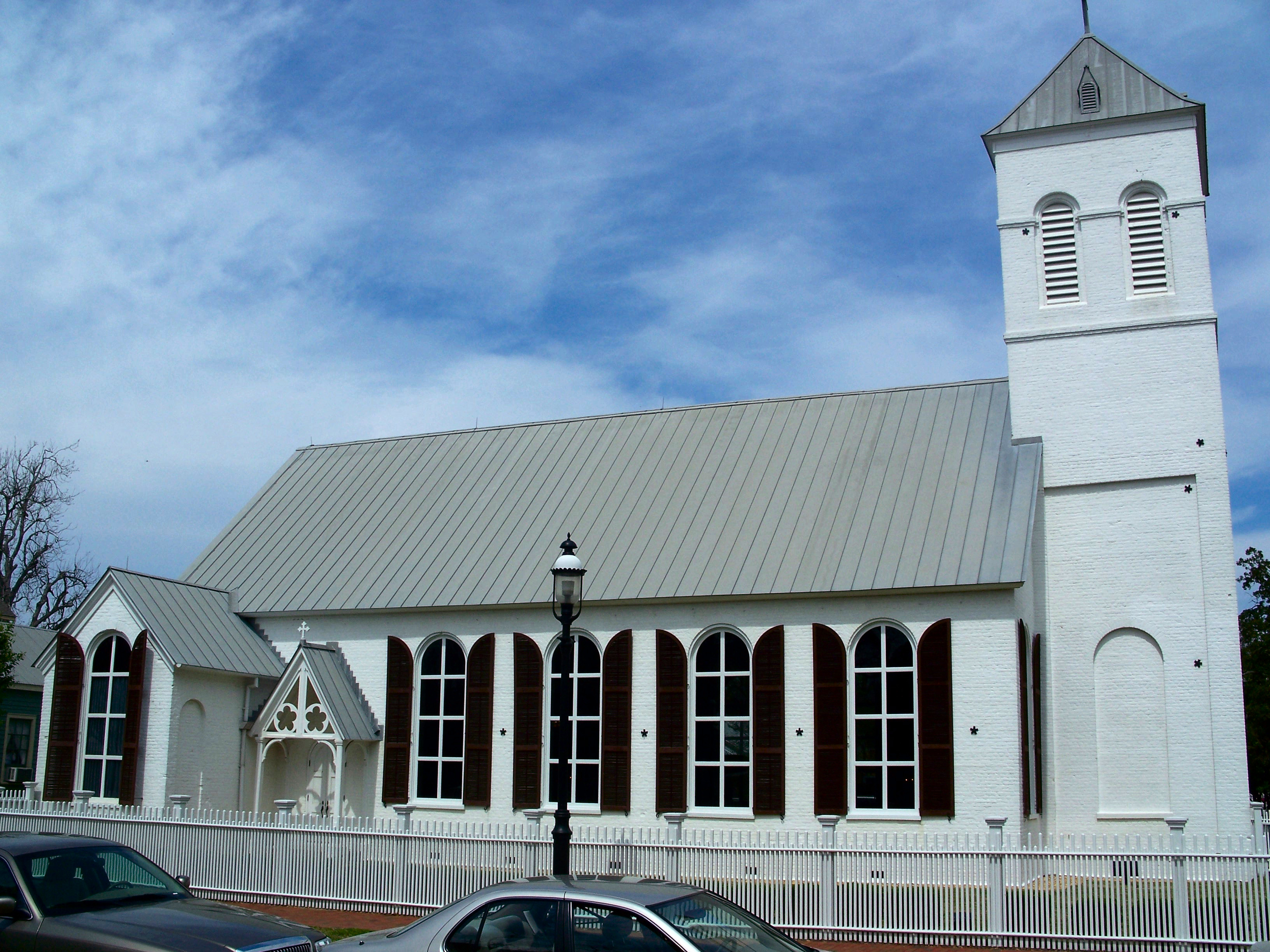

- Location within Florida Location within the United States
- Location: 405 S. Adams St., Pensacola, Florida
- Coordinates: 30°24′33″N 87°12′38″W
- Area: 0.3 acres (0.12 ha)
- Architectural style: Gothic Revival
- NRHP reference No.: 74000621
- Added to NRHP: May 3, 1974

The Old Christ Church, also known as Christ Church, built in 1832 in Pensacola, Florida is a historic Episcopal church building. It is one of the oldest surviving church buildings in Florida. On May 3, 1974, it was added to the U.S. National Register of Historic Places.

In 1989, the building was listed in A Guide to Florida's Historic Architecture, published by the University of Florida Press. Located at 405 South Adams Street, the old church is now part of Historic Pensacola Village and is shown as part of the daily tours.

== History ==
In 1828, Episcopal Priest Ralph Williston arrived in Pensacola, Florida. Florida had recently been acquired (in 1822) by the United States; with the acquisition came a surge of missionaries. With some of the town's Protestants supporting him, Williston acquired a charter and the property to build a church. In 1829, the congregation was incorporated by an act of the territorial Legislative Council and in 1830, construction began. In 1832, the first worship services were held by Reverend Addison Searle.

During the Civil War, many of Pensacola's residents left. The church was used as a barracks and military chapel by Union soldiers. In 1865, regular church services resumed. In 1902, a new Christ Church was built and the congregation relocated there. The old church was then used by a black Episcopal congregation, Saint Cyprian's, from 1903-1905. In 1936, the church was deconsecrated and given to the City of Pensacola. The church then served as the town's library from 1937 to 1957. Since 1960, the church has been occupied by the UWF Historical Trust.

=== Excavations ===
From May to July 1988, the University of West Florida began excavating the church in search of the graves of three early priests buried in the 1830s: Reverends Saunders, Peake, and Flower. Contemporary church officials suspected that Union soldiers had disturbed the graves during the occupation of the church but historians did not agree.

In 1879, the church was expanded and its original vestry, built in 1830-1832, was demolished. During excavations of the original vestry area, three burials were found. Although there were no burial markers, it is believed that the burials found were of Saunders, Peake, and Flower. The excavation also found the remains of a burned First Spanish building and wall-structures not reflected on any colonial maps.

== See also ==
- Episcopal Day School (Pensacola, Florida)
- Oldest churches in the United States
