= William Wolf (Kansas politician) =

American politician

Member of the Kansas House of Representatives from the 112th district
- In office January 8, 2007 – January 14, 2013
- Preceded by: John Edmonds
- Succeeded by: John Edmonds

Personal details
- Born: September 24, 1935 (age 90)
- Party: Republican
- Spouse: Peggy

William M. Wolf (September 24, 1935) is a former member of the Kansas House of Representatives, who represented the 112th district from 2007 to 2013.

== Committee membership ==
- Commerce and Labor
- Transportation
- Agriculture and Natural Resources

== Major donors ==
The top 5 donors to Wolf's 2008 campaign:

- 1. Koch Industries $1,000
- 2. Kansas Medical Society $1,000
- 3. Kansas Bankers Assoc $1,000
- 4. Kansas Republican Party $1,000
- 5. Prairie Band Potawatomi Nation $1,000
