= St. Joseph's Catholic Church (Pensacola) =

Historic church in Florida, United States

- St. Joseph's Church Buildings
- U.S. National Register of Historic Places
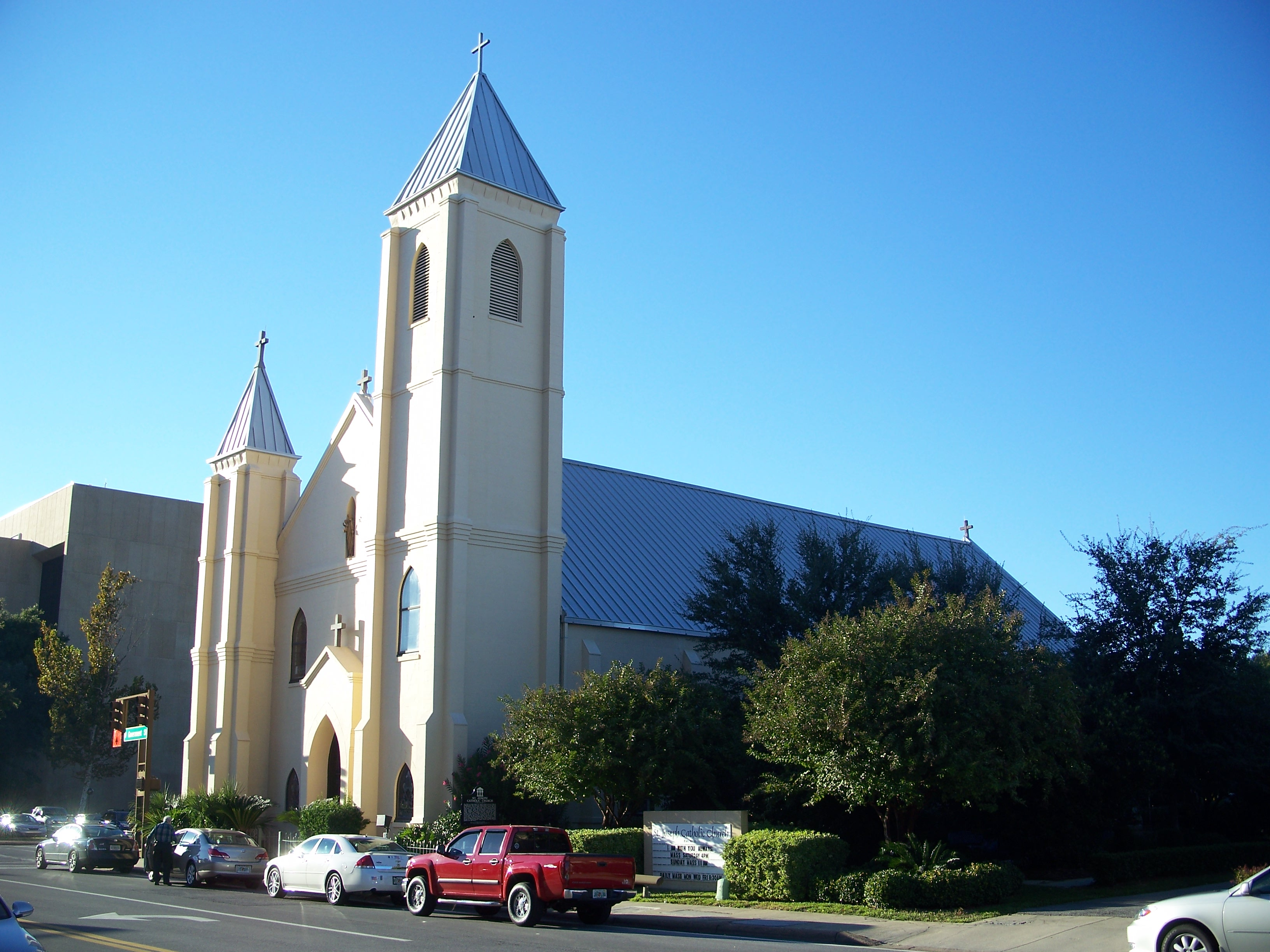

- Location within Florida Location within the United States
- Location: 140 W. Government St., Pensacola, Florida
- Coordinates: 30°24′33″N 87°13′5″W
- Area: less than one acre
- Architect: Hernandes, Manuel; Et al.
- Architectural style: Late Gothic Revival
- NRHP reference No.: 79000671
- Added to NRHP: July 10, 1979

St. Joseph Catholic Church (also known as the St. Joseph's Church Buildings or the St. Joseph's Complex) is a historic Black Catholic parish in Pensacola, Florida. On July 10, 1979, it was added to the U.S. National Register of Historic Places.

== History ==
The parish was established in 1891 at the behest of one Mercedes Ruby, following Black Catholic schools opened there in 1877 by the Sisters of Mercy, one for Blacks and the other for Creoles. The first church was a two-story frame building, and the current building was constructed in 1894, dedicated on May 30.

The parish was unique in that it was established for African Americans, but was dominated by a White immigrant membership and controlled administratively by the Black Creoles. An integrated cemetery arrived in 1900. The White members of St Joseph were forced out with the advent of Jim Crow in the 1920s.

In the 1920s, the church's pastor built an orphanage on the property for homeless African-American boys, and brought in the Trinitarians.

In 1938, the pastor closed the orphanage and the schools, but one school eventually reopened under the Sisters of Charity. 1939, a high school was opened on the property, the first Black Catholic high school in the state at the time.

In its heyday, the parish operated the "Maryall Negro Mission" and four chapels. Next to the two schools, the parish also ran Our Lady of Angels Maternity Hospital for Black women, administered by sisters of the Third Order of Saint Francis.

In the 1960s, with the onset of integration, the mission, chapel, hospital, and high school closed, followed by the one remaining school in 1977.

The complex was added to the National Register of Historic Places in 1979.

In 1981, a council of the Knights of Peter Claver was established at the parish. In the 90s, the church celebrated its centennial and their gospel choir traveled to Rome to sing for Pope John Paul II.

The complex was heavily damaged by Hurricane Ivan in 2004, including the church steeple being blown into the roof. Major flooding also occurred. During and immediately after the repairs, Hurricanes Dennis and Hurricane Katrina nearly hit Pensacola head-on.

A medical clinic with the same name as the hospital would eventually be opened, active as of 2016.

== See also ==
- Historical Marker Database
