= L & N Marine Terminal Building =

- U.S. National Register of Historic Places
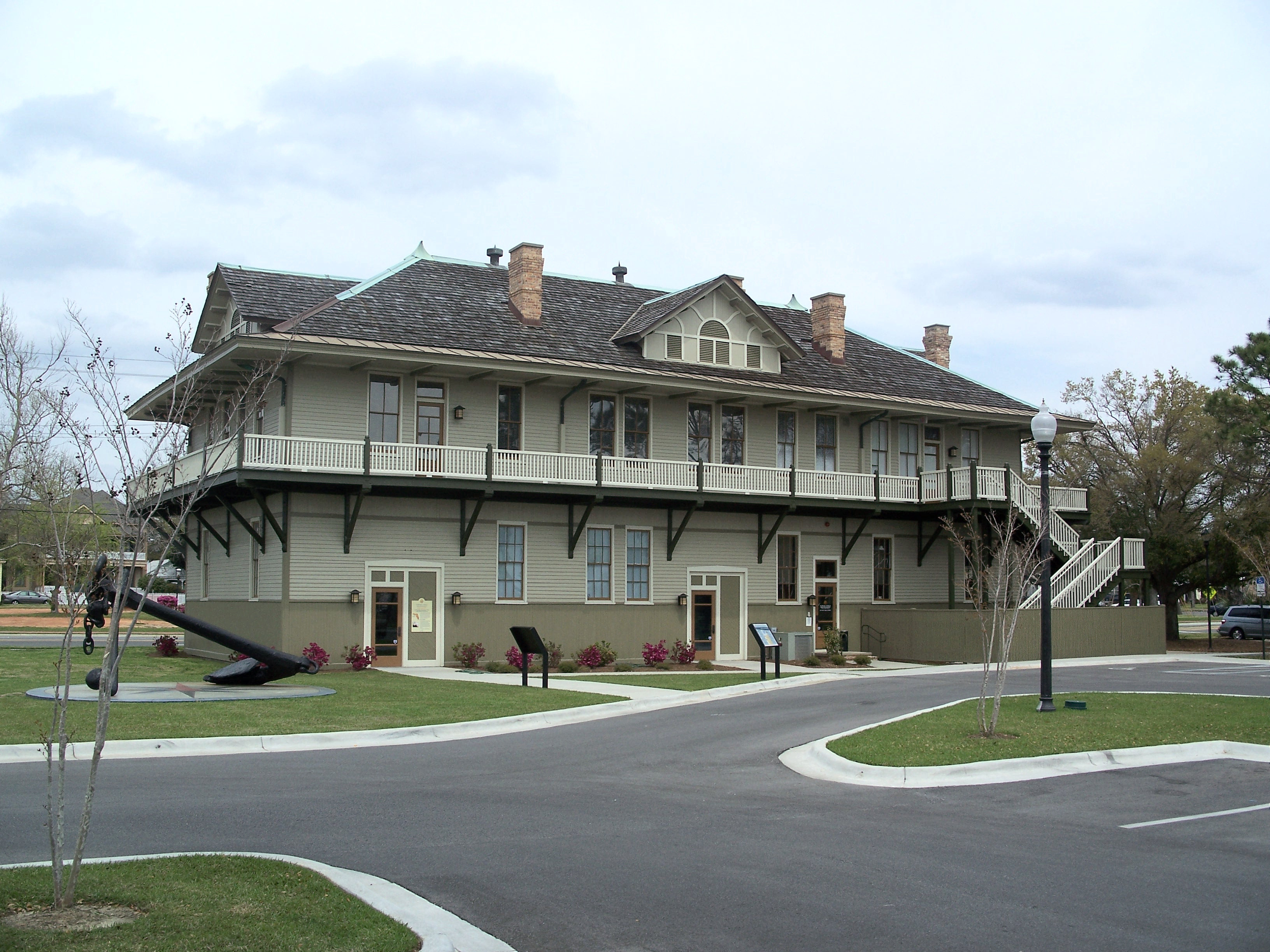

- Location within Florida Location within the United States
- Location: Pensacola, Florida
- Coordinates: 30°24′28″N 87°12′41″W
- Area: less than one acre
- NRHP reference No.: 72000315
- Added to NRHP: August 14, 1972

The L & N Marine Terminal Building is a historic site in Pensacola, Florida. It is located at Commendencia Street Wharf. On August 14, 1972, it was added to the U.S. National Register of Historic Places.

In 1989, the building was listed in A Guide to Florida's Historic Architecture, published by the University of Florida Press.
