= Boy Scout Building (Pensacola, Florida) =

- U.S. National Register of Historic Places
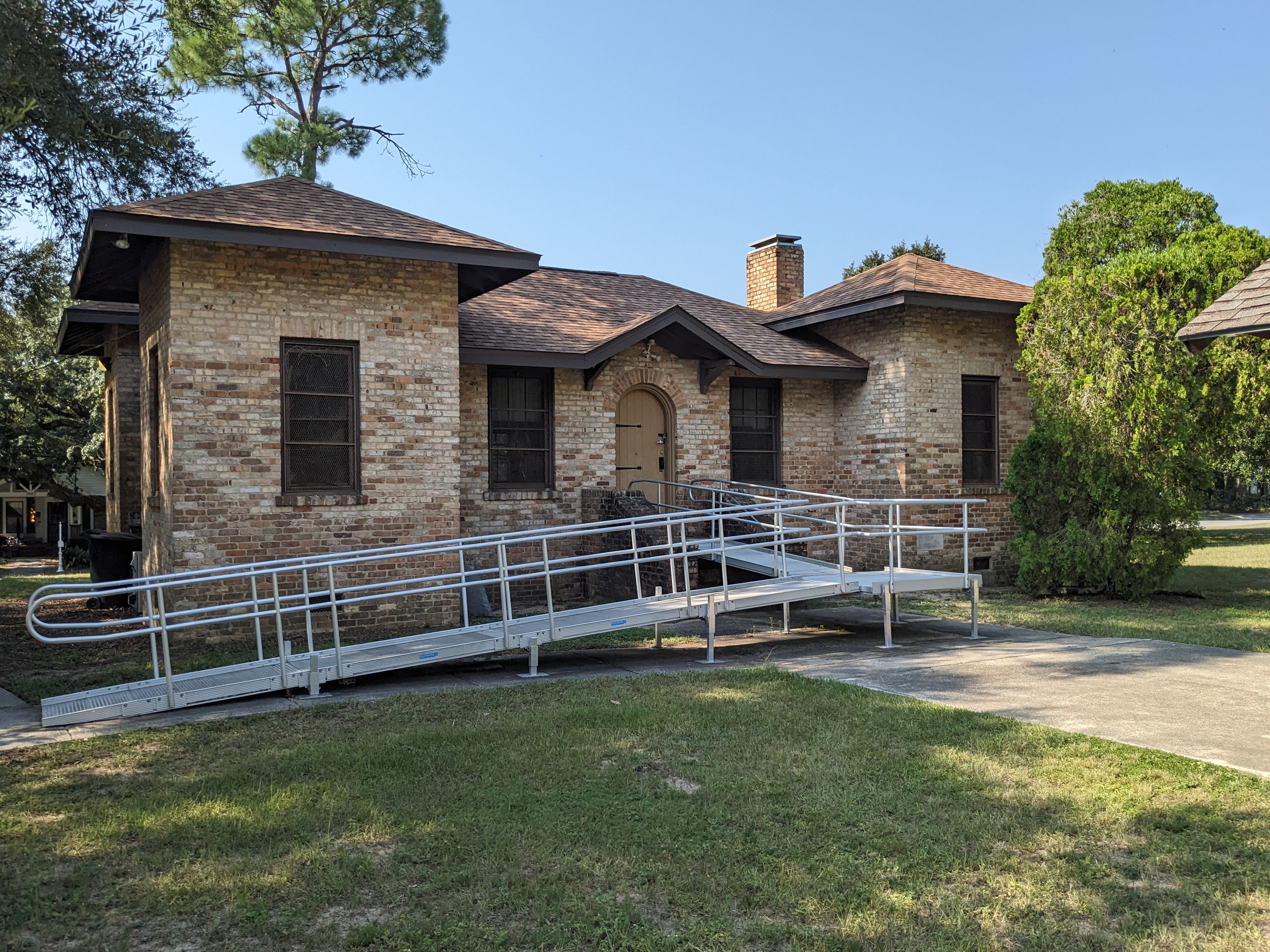
- The building in August 2024

- Location within Florida Location within the United States
- Location: 1600 E. Belmont Street, Pensacola, Florida
- Coordinates: 30.4217°N 87.1952°W
- Built: 1934
- NRHP reference No.: 100005239
- Added to NRHP: May 29, 2020

The Boy Scout Building, formerly called the Elebash Center, Inc. for Boy Scouts and Girl Scouts, is an historic building located in Miraflores Park (formerly Havana Park) in Pensacola, Florida.

== Background ==
Built in 1934 by the Civilian Conservation Corps for the Boy Scouts of America, by 1965, the building was in poor condition. It was restored in the 1970s by the Bream Fisherman Association. Today, it is used as a community gathering place.

In June 2021, as a group of Boy Scouts were cleaning the building, they found human remains in a crawl space underneath the building. Members of the University of West Florida Historic Trust later found a map dating to 1884 that denoted a graveyard in the area. It is believed that the graveyard was for black residents and a park was later developed on the land.
