= Marzoni House =

- U.S. National Register of Historic Places
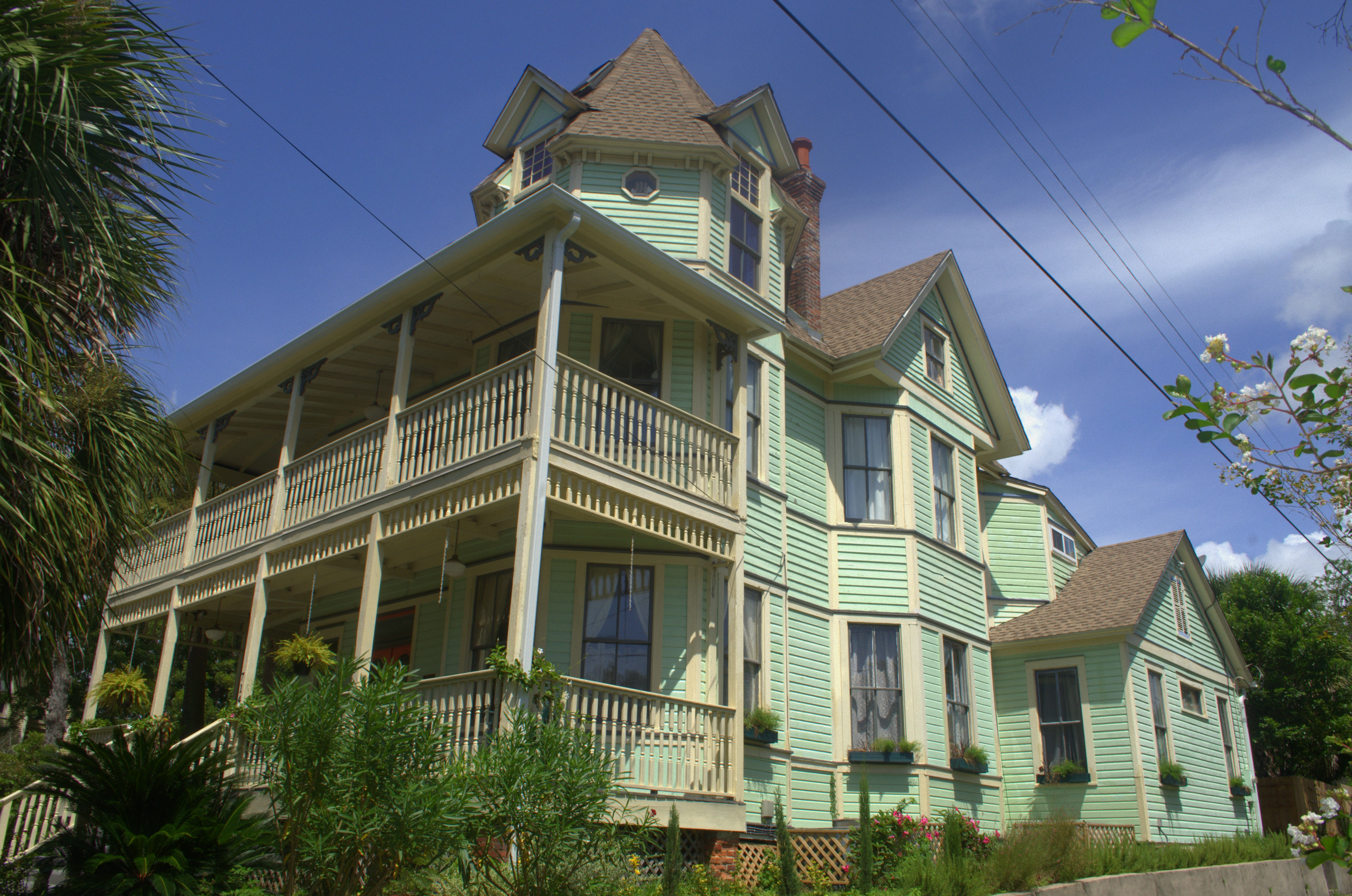
- Marzoni House in 2017

- Location within Florida Location within the United States
- Location: Pensacola, Florida
- Coordinates: 30°25′12.66″N 87°12′28.68″W
- Built: 1890
- Architectural style: Queen Anne
- NRHP reference No.: 16000245
- Added to NRHP: May 10, 2016

The Marzoni House is a historic house in Pensacola, Florida. Built in 1890, is an example of Queen Anne architecture. It was listed on the National Register of Historic Places on May 10, 2016.

== History ==
Louis D. Marzoni, born in 1856, ran a grocery store in Pensacola and worked for a lumber company. He later started a shipping firm, Smith & Marzoni. The house he had built was a model of Queen Anne style. He built the house with old-growth heart pine like the export product from Pensacola. The Marzoni House has twelve foot ceilings and a plethora of custom built detail work and a corner octagonal tower. Very little of the house has been rebuilt. The Marzoni House, built in 1890 for Louis D. Marzoni, son of Antonio Marzoni, a newspaperman who ran "The Florida Democrat and mechanic's and workingman's advocate" and Pensacola Observer which ran from 1846 to 1856 and fought on the American Civil War.
