= Episcopal Day School (Pensacola, Florida) =

Private school in Florida, United States

Coordinates: 30.416319°N 87.216761°W

Episcopal Day School
Name	Episcopal Day School
Location	Downtown Pensacola, Florida 32502
Established	1952
Type	Private
Religion	Episcopalian
Denomination	Episcopal
Grades	PreK2 to 8
Accreditation	Florida Council of Independent Schools (FCIS), and Southern Association of Independent Schools (SAIS)
Mascot	Jaguar
Colors	Red, White, Gray, and Light Blue
Website	http://www.edscc.org

Episcopal Day School (EDS) is an independent, co-educational school in Pensacola, Florida, providing courses from pre-kindergarten to grade 8 levels. The roots of Episcopal Day School date back to 1856 when an educational ministry was founded as a part of Old Christ Church. The school in its current form has operated since 1952. While founded on Episcopal traditions, EDS is welcoming of all faiths and backgrounds.

The core curriculum focuses on Reading/Literature, Writing, Math, Science, Social Studies, and Spanish. Additional enrichment classes include Library, Technology, Robotics, Physical Education, Christian Education, and the Arts. Christian education is taught as an enrichment class and the students attend chapel every Wednesday.

== Chapel ==
Every Wednesday, grades PreK-2 through eighth grade and their teachers gather for chapel by walking across the street to Christ Church parish. Students help run the service by doing various parts. The fourth grade makes up the choir that sings hymns, the sixth and seventh grades do the readings from the book of Episcopal Book of Common Prayer and stories from the Bible. The eighth grade makes up the Acolyte team which leads the Priests and Choir down the aisle at the beginning and end of the service. PreK-2 through first grade has its own chapel. Second grade through eighth grade with their teachers attend chapel services throughout the school year.

== Curriculum ==
The core curriculum at EDS focuses on comprehensive instruction in the subject areas of Reading/Literature, Writing, Math, Science, Social Studies, and Spanish. Additional enrichment classes include Library, Technology, Robotics, Physical Education, Christian Education, and the Arts.

== Faculty and staff ==
There are approximately 60 members of the faculty and staff, with 8 members on the administration.

== Grades ==
There are three programs offered at EDS: preschool, lower school, and middle school. Preschool offers PreK-2 through Prek-4, while Lower school offers Kindergarten through 4th grade. The middle school consists of 5th through 8th grade.

== Uniforms ==
All students of EDS are required to wear uniforms. For shirts, there are choices between white, red, and gray polos. Shirts must be monogrammed. Boys may wear khaki pants or shorts. Girls may wear a khaki or plaid skirt, khaki pants or shorts, or a jumper. A separate uniform is worn on chapel day and on field trips.

== Sports ==
There are sports in which students can participate. These sports include basketball, volleyball, football, tennis, track, and swimming. Volleyball is offered for only the fifth, sixth, seventh, and eighth grades. Basketball begins in the fourth grade and continues to the eighth.

== Accreditation ==
Episcopal Day School is accredited by the Southern Association of Independent Schools (SAIS,) and the Florida Council of Independent Schools (FCIS).
