= Johnny Edmond =

Mauritian footballer

Personal information
- Full name: Johnny Edmond
- Date of birth: 13 September 1969 (age 57)
- Place of birth: Mauritius
- Position: Striker

Senior career*
Years	Team	Apps	(Gls)
2001–2008	Olympique Moka	?	(?)

International career
1994–2002	Mauritius	7	(0)
- * Club domestic league appearances and goals

Johnny Edmond (born 13 September 1969) is a Mauritian former international footballer who played as a striker. He won seven caps for the Mauritius national football team. Having originated from the Chagos Islands he has been capped by their national side, which is not recognised by FIFA.
