= West Florida Public Libraries =

Library system in Florida, United States

Coordinates: 30.4155°N 87.2188°W

West Florida Public Library
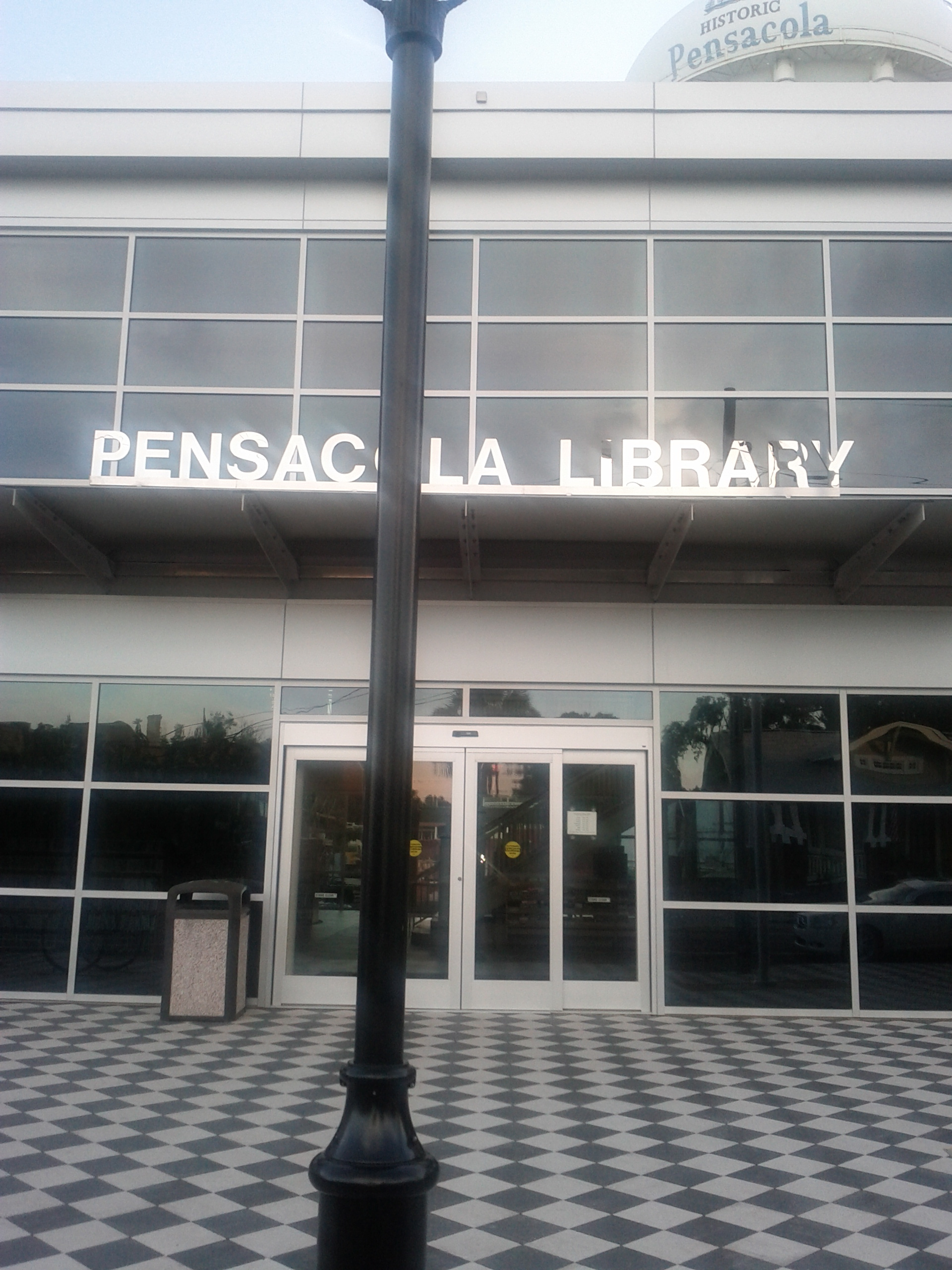
- Main Entrance on North Spring Street
- Location: 239 North Spring Street; Pensacola, Florida, United States
- Type: Public
- Established: 1885
- Branches: 7

Collection
- Size: 360,000

Access and use
- Circulation: 1,083,813
- Population served: 50,000 (city); 400,000 (metro)

Other information
- Budget: US$ 9,379,354
- Director: Todd Humble
- Employees: 83

The West Florida Public Library System is an organization of libraries that serve the Pensacola, Florida area with branch libraries in Escambia County, Florida.

The library system currently has approximately 360,000 books, 36,000 audio resources, and 14,000 video resources in circulation. In addition to its branch libraries, the library system operates a mobile library, the "Wandering Library", which visits a number of areas in Escambia County each week. For fiscal year 2018–2019 the library system had 572,533 faculty visits to all branches.

== Branch libraries ==
- Pensacola Public Library – 239 N. Spring St., Pensacola, FL 32502 (downtown Pensacola)
- Tryon Branch Library – 1200 Langley Ave., Pensacola, FL 32504
- Southwest Branch Library —12248 Gulf Beach Hwy., Pensacola, FL 32507 (southwest Pensacola, near Perdido Key)
- Westside Branch Library – 1301 W. Gregory St., Pensacola, FL 32502
- Century Branch Library – 7991 N. Century Blvd., Century, FL 32535
- Molino Branch Library – 6450-A Highway 95A, Molino, FL 32577 (inside the Molino Community Center)
- Bellview Library – 6424 Mobile Hwy., Pensacola, FL 32526

== History ==
As new industries brought the city of Pensacola to life in the latter parts of the 19th century, residents were without formal library services and limited to buying books and exchanging reading materials amongst themselves. Observing and experiencing functioning libraries in cities other than their own, these citizens, under the leadership of a local dentist, took steps to create the first formal "library association" in Pensacola. Theo La Far and his associates established the first informal exchange of resources in Pensacola and Escambia County in 1883. The association then took steps to hire Lettie Flynn, a library attendant who would remain employed with the growing library system for 40 years through multiple relocations and the eventual expansion of services.

In 1885, the Pensacola Library Association organized as a subscription library. The library had 184 members who paid .25/month to use the library. During the years of 1904, 1910, 1911 and 1919, the city made attempts to secure $15,000 in Carnegie funds for assistance with building a public library. In order to receive this funding, all Carnegie grant recipients had to agree to several stipulations. These conditions included a demonstrated financial need for the funding, an appropriate site for the construction, willingness to provide staffing and allot ten percent annually to support the library's operation, and equal access to all patrons regardless of race or color As Pensacola was unable to provide a site or future support for such a library, it was unable to obtain the funds. Furthermore, despite repeated requests, the library association remained unwilling to provide free access to all members of the community, forcing their eventual exclusion from all Carnegie grant monies. The city later allotted 25.00/month and then 50.00/month to the library. Still, the library moved to various locations downtown and, at some point, a bond election failed. In 1933, the subscription library closed and its books were stored in the San Carlos Hotel.

In February 1937, the Pensacola City Council passed an ordinance to establish a free public library and it created a five-member board. In January 1938, Lucia Tryon was hired as librarian to convert Old Christ Church to the city's first formal public library which opened on February 15, 1938 with 3352 books. Also in 1938, the Shakespeare Club opened a library on Oak St. in Milton, Florida. By March 1, 1938, the Pensacola free public library counted 2,375 cardholders. On August 17, 1952, the Alice S. Williams branch was opened to serve the black community and in 1957, a new Pensacola public library opened at Spring and Gregory St. Finally, in 1963, the city of Santa Rosa entered into an inter-local agreement with the city of Pensacola with service to 1,800 patrons at the Milton branch library. This was the beginning of the West Florida Regional Library System.

== Funding and administration ==
The Escambia County branches and the Wandering Library are funded primarily by the City of Pensacola and Escambia County. The branches also receive aid supplement funds from the state, as well as federal grant money.

The West Florida Public Library System is administered by the West Florida Public Library Board, which is made up of nine members, three of which are appointed by the Pensacola City Council and the Escambia County Commission.

While several libraries in Santa Rosa County (including the Gulf Breeze, Jay Navarre & Milton branches) used to be a part of the West Florida Regional Library system, they have since parted ways, hence the name change to 'West Florida Public Library'.

== Services provided ==
- Electronic books: The library provides patrons access to both downloadable eBooks and eAudiobooks via RBdigital and EBSCO. The library will be transferring from RBdigital to Libby sometime in October 2020. The library also has online access to TumbleBooks.
- Meeting and study rooms: The library provides study rooms, on a first come, first served basis. Meeting rooms are also available by application, with two weeks notice requested.
- Book clubs: Pensacola, Tryon and Molino libraries feature monthly book clubs.
- Interlibrary !oan: The library offers interlibrary loan for books, books on CD and music CDs (items must be at least 6 months old). DVDs may not be interlibrary loaned. Patrons may request 5 items within a 30-day period.
- "Breaker Space": where patrons young and old can go to disassemble electronics to learn circuit and design principles.
- Career Online High School Program: This program offers adults (19 and older) who have not previously earned a high school diploma or a high school equivalency diploma the opportunity to earn an accredited high school diploma.
- Talking books and braille: The library is a sub-regional library of the Florida Bureau of Braille and Talking Books Library which provides recorded books and magazines as well as Braille books for patrons with visual or physical disabilities which making reading difficult.
- West Florida Public Libraries continue to be recognized by the Urban Libraries Council for the Young Leaders Library Card Challenge as the first public library in Florida to provide library cards to all 50,000 K–12 students in Escambia County.
- As good stewards to the community, West Florida Public Libraries has been recognized as a leading provider of student meals in the "Feeding the Gulf Coast Summer Meals Program" with over 50,000 meals distributed by August 2020.

== Computer services ==
- Computer use: Currently all branches have computers for cardholders to use. The Main Branch has the most internet terminals, which has been recently upgraded with the completion of the new building. There are now 34 computers. All computers are the same with 17 inch flat screen monitors, all running Windows 7 on a Dell Optiplex 390, with an Intell Core i5. The entire Library is a Wi-Fi hotspot, and you can connect any of your wireless devices if you choose to bring in your own. There is a glassed-in computer lab, which is primarily being used for computer classes that are offered each month to help those who need to learn how to use a computer.
- Sprout PCs: The library now has a number of Sprout computers. These computers have 3D imaging programs, with many uses including art, coin identification, music mixing, and piano instruction.
- Faxing and copying: The library offers faxing and copying at most locations. Fax service is not available at the Genealogy branch.

== See also ==
- Pensacola
