= John Edmund (theatre) =

John Edmund (c. 1924 – 19 June 2003) was a theatre director in Adelaide, South Australia. He founded Theatre 62, that state's first professional theatre company.

== History ==
Edmund was born Eddie Shuttleworth in Leigh, Greater Manchester, son of an engineer, but became active in theatre. He started learning ballet at age four, and at age 14 was given the highest marks of male dancers at the Royal Academy. He played juvenile roles in vaudeville and revue until interrupted by the World War. He was accepted for military training at Sandhurst and the Indian Military College at Dehra Dun, then signed with the 7th Gurkha Rifles, stationed at Palampur. After the war he was engaged by the State of Bengal as Director of Entertainment under Jack Hawkins.

He travelled to Australia in the late 1940s with Anew McMaster's Shakespeare Company, playing Lodovico in Othello, and at the end of the six-month tour decided to settle in Australia. He won a prime part in Terence Rattigan's The Deep Blue Sea with Googie Withers and John McCallum. The show toured for 15 months, then he decided to settle in Adelaide.

He was soon involved in the local theatre scene, playing the solicitor in Is Your Honeymoon Really Necessary in 1950, and in Larger than Life, opposite Jessie Matthews, and on radio in Clemence Dane's 'Call Home the Heart' starring Lyndall Barbour, Moray Powell and Leonard Thiele.

In 1962 he founded Theatre 62 in the Adelaide suburb of Hilton.

Apart from his work as theatre director and producer, he was for eight years a panelist for the Australian TV talent show New Faces.

In 1975 he became a lecturer in communications at Adelaide's Sturt College, which was later absorbed into Flinders University.

He died in hospital of a stroke, aged 79. He was under treatment for prostate cancer.

== Recognition ==
The theatre at 89 Halifax Street, Adelaide, was named John Edmund Theatre.

The National Library of Australia has a collection of biographical cuttings relating to Edmund: BID 340997
