= John Edmonds (Kansas politician) =

American politician

Member of the Kansas House of Representatives from the 112th district
- In office January 14, 2013 – January 9, 2017
- Preceded by: William Wolf
- Succeeded by: Tory Marie Arnberger
- In office January 9, 1995 – January 8, 2007
- Preceded by: Bob Mead
- Succeeded by: William Wolf

Personal details
- Born: July 2, 1951 (age 75) Lawrence, Kansas, U.S.
- Party: Republican
- Spouse: Marta
- Children: 1
- Education: University of Missouri-Kansas City
- Profession: Accountant

John Edmonds (born July 2, 1951) is an American politician. He served as a Republican member for the 112th district in the Kansas House of Representatives from 1995 to 2006, and again from 2013 to 2016. In 2016, the American Conservative Union gave him a lifetime rating of 75%.
