= John Edmonds (died 1544) =

16th-century English politician

John Edmonds (by 1503–1544), of the Middle Temple, London and Little Waltham, Essex, was an English politician.

== Family ==
Edmonds had four sons and two daughters by his wife, Mary.

== Career ==
He was a member (MP) of the parliament of England for Maldon in 1539.
