= John Edmunds Apartment House =

- U.S. National Register of Historic Places
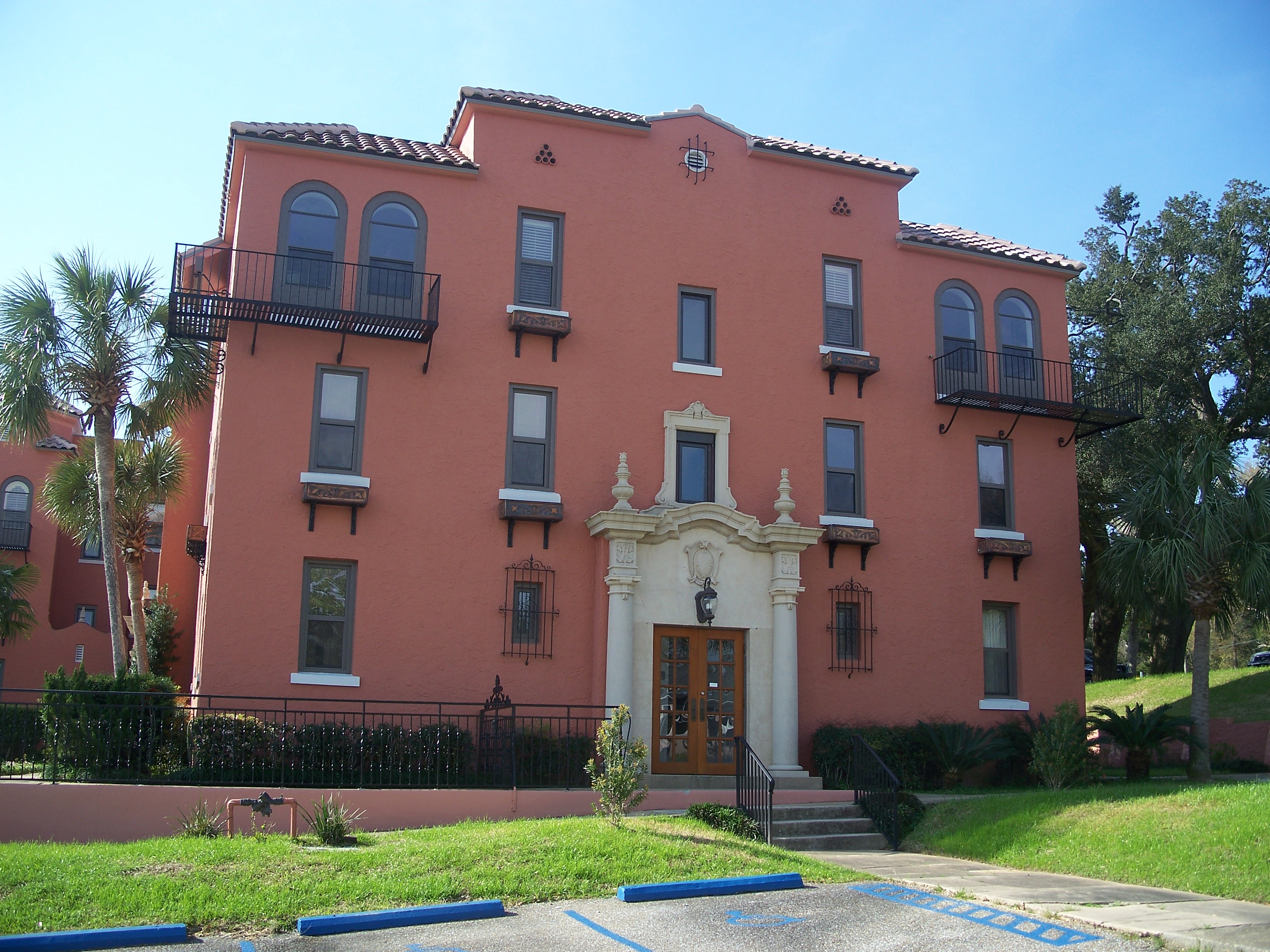
- John Edmunds Apartment House in 2008

- Location within Florida Location within the United States
- Location: Pensacola, Florida
- Coordinates: 30°25′31″N 87°11′24″W
- Architectural style: Mediterranean Revival
- NRHP reference No.: 83001444
- Added to NRHP: September 29, 1983

The John Edmunds Apartment House (also known as Mirador) is a historic apartment house in Pensacola, Florida, United States. It is located at 2007 East Gadsden Street. On September 29, 1983, it was added to the U.S. National Register of Historic Places.
