= Lavalle House =

Historic house in Florida, United States

- U.S. National Register of Historic Places
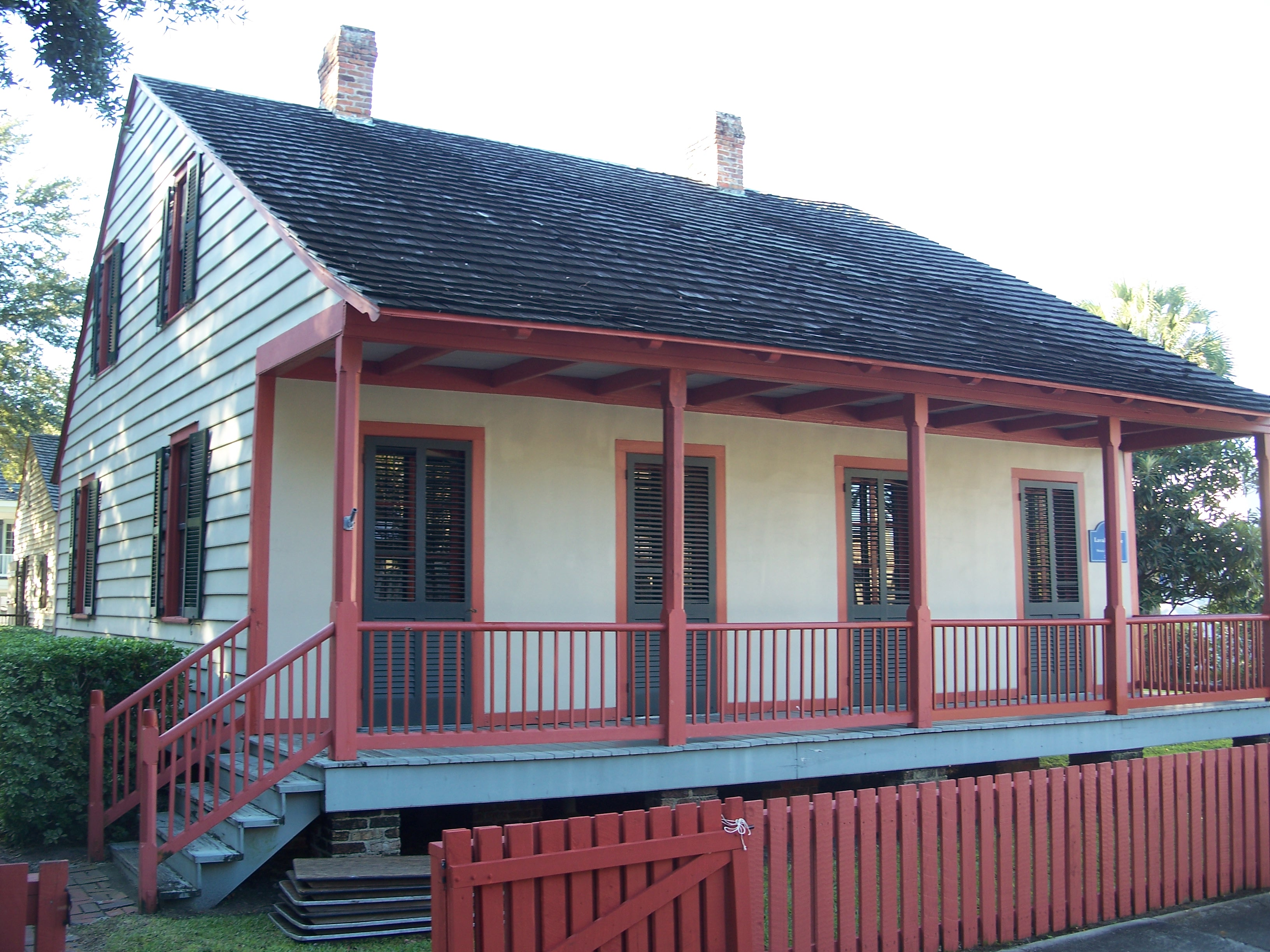
- Charles Lavalle House

- Location within Florida
- Interactive map showing the location of Lavalle House
- Location: Pensacola, Florida
- Coordinates: 30°24′32″N 87°12′44″W
- Built: 1805
- Architectural style: Gulf coast
- NRHP reference No.: 71000237
- Added to NRHP: March 11, 1971

The Lavalle House (also known as the Charles Lavalle House) is a historic house located at 203 East Church Street in Pensacola, Florida. Built in 1805, the Charles Lavalle House is part of Historic Pensacola Village, and features a French Creole period style. It is one of the oldest houses in Pensacola and one of the few structures that remain from Spanish Florida.

On March 11, 1971, it was added to the U.S. National Register of Historic Places for its Gulf Coast architectural style.

== History ==
Charles Lavalle, a builder and property owner, owned the property from 1803 to 1815. In 1854, when Lavalle died, he owned 25 different properties. In 1968, the Historic Pensacola Preservation Board moved the house to prevent its demolition.
