= Clara Barkley Dorr House =

Historic house in Florida, United States

- U.S. National Register of Historic Places
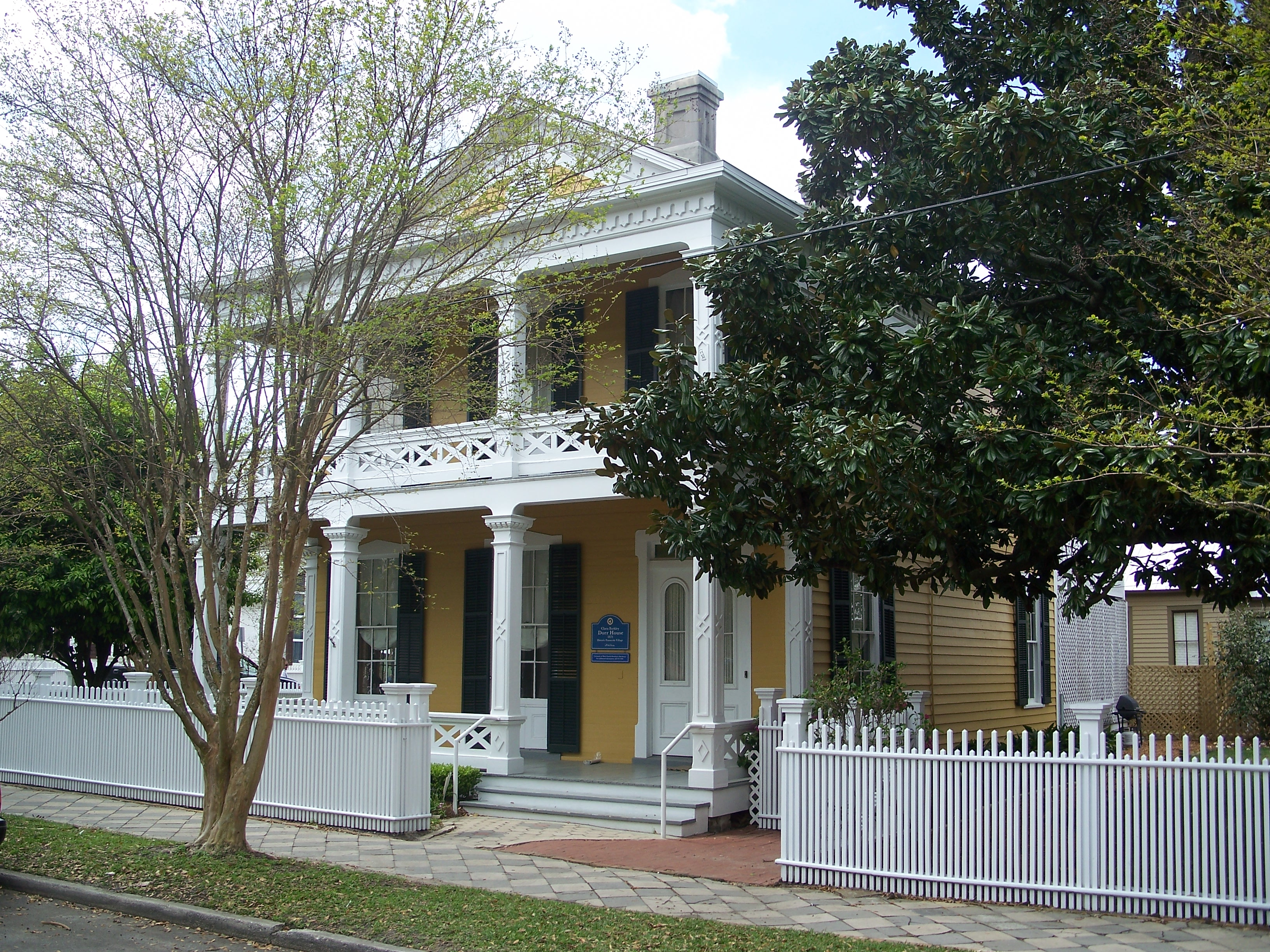

- Location within Florida Location within the United States
- Interactive map showing the location of Clara Barkley Dorr House
- Location: Pensacola, Florida
- Coordinates: 30°24′32″N 87°12′38″W
- Area: less than one acre
- Architectural style: Classical revival
- NRHP reference No.: 74000619
- Added to NRHP: July 24, 1974

The Clara Barkley Dorr House is an historic home in Pensacola, Florida. Built in 1871, it is located at 311 South Adams Street. On July 24, 1974, it was added to the U.S. National Register of Historic Places for its classical revival architecture.

In 1989, the house was listed in A Guide to Florida's Historic Architecture, published by the University of Florida Press.

The house is part of Historic Pensacola Village and is now a Victorian period museum house open to the public.

== History ==
Clara Barkley married Eben Walker Dorr in 1849. The couple lived in Bagdad, Florida where Eben worked for a lumber company. In 1870, Eben died. Clara had the house built in 1871 in Pensacola to accommodate her and her five children.

By the 1960s, the house was in poor condition. The Pensacola Heritage Foundation bought the building in 1965, restored it, and opened access to the public.
