= Pensacola Historic District =

Historic district in Florida, United States

- U.S. National Register of Historic Places
- U.S. Historic district
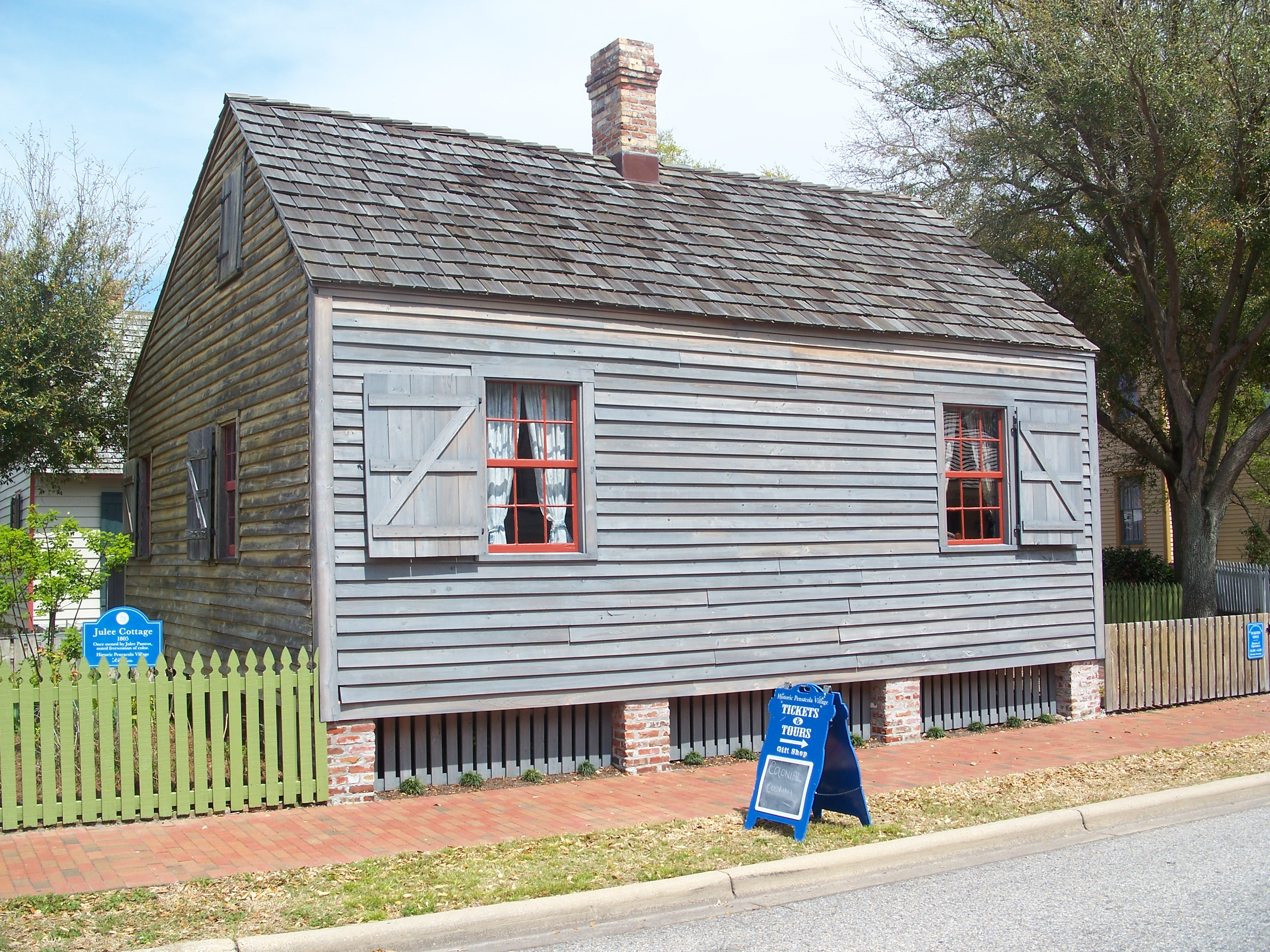
- Julee Cottage, in the district

- Location within Florida Location within the United States
- Location: Pensacola, Florida
- Coordinates: 30°24′38″N 87°12′36″W
- Area: 108 acres (44 ha)
- NRHP reference No.: 70000184
- Added to NRHP: September 29, 1970

The Pensacola Historic District (also known as the Seville Historic District) is a U.S. historic district (designated as such on September 29, 1970) located in Pensacola, Florida.

The district is roughly bounded by Bayfront Parkway, Tarragona, Romana and Cevallos Streets. Within the district are the Historic Pensacola Village, the Pensacola Museum of History and Seville Square. Seville Square and its twin Plaza Ferdinand VII were the parade grounds for the Fort of Pensacola established during British rule. A site to the northeast of the Pensacola Historic District on the Pensacola Bay is the earliest known European settlement on the North American continent, dating to 1559.

== Establishment ==
=== Pensacola Heritage Foundation ===
In the early 1960s, a group of local preservationists led by Pensacolian Mary Turner Rule (née Reed) formed the Pensacola Heritage Foundation, joined the National Trust and surveyed the Seville Square Historic District, the neighborhood around Seville Square adjacent to Pensacola Bay. Realizing the importance of Pensacola's history and the need to save it, Rule and the Heritage Foundation nominated the Pensacola Historic District to be listed on the National Register of Historic Places. The group purchased the Dorr House and restored it. They convinced the city to bring the deteriorated square to its present-day restored state. Then they created a festival, a hometown Victorian picnic in the park, An Evening in Old Seville Square, to bring Pensacolians to the district encouraging restoration. Rule had the famous lighthouse at the Navy Air Station listed on the National Register. She also helped create a state board now called the N.W. Florida Preservation Board, whose function is to protect the Seville Square Historic District and Pensacola's history. The city established the Architecture Review board to protect Pensacola's history locally.

=== UWF Historic Trust ===
In 1967, the Pensacola Historical Preservation and Restoration Commission was founded to preserve the history of Pensacola, including its historic monuments and buildings, to educate the public. In 2001, the organization was repealed by the Florida legislature and its collections and buildings were transferred to the University of West Florida (UWF). In 2009, the Pensacola Heritage Society merged with the organization to become the West Florida Historic Preservation, renamed in 2013 to UWF Historic Trust.

== Historic Pensacola Village ==
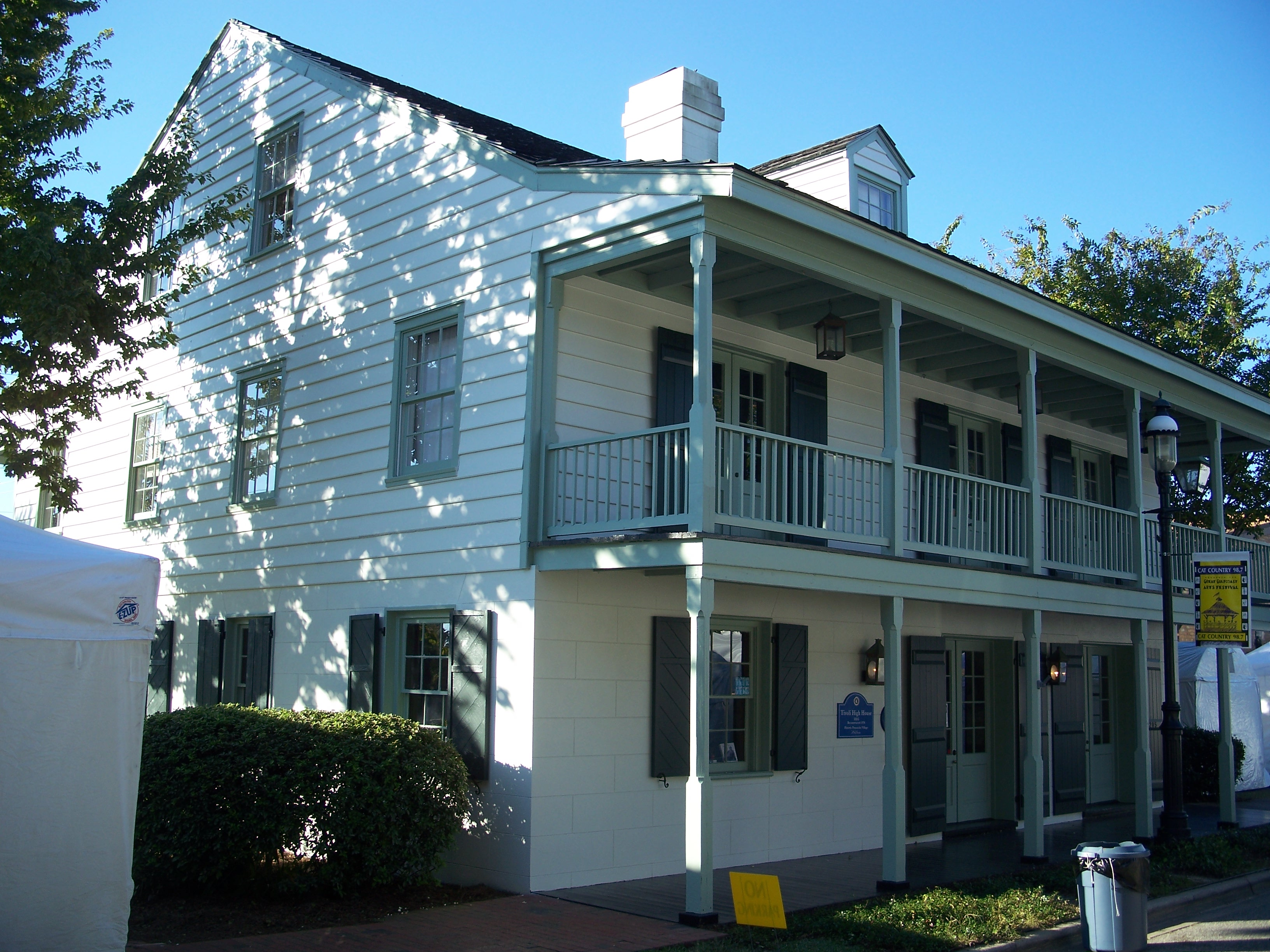
Tivoli High House, ticket and information center for the Village.

Historic Pensacola (located within the Pensacola Historic District) is a collection of 28 historical buildings and museums managed by the University of West Florida's Historic Trust. Historic Pensacola is located in downtown Pensacola, Florida, situated between Plaza Ferdinand VII and Seville Square.

=== Buildings and museums ===
- Pensacola Museum of History
- Pensacola Children's Museum
- Museum of Commerce: a reconstruction of a Pensacola, Florida street scene based on businesses that operated in Pensacola between 1880 and 1910. The Museum consists of twenty properties; some are interpretive history sites. They include stores for toys, leather goods, hardware and music, a print shop, a gas station, and a tram. The print shop contains one of the most complete collections of antique printing presses and type in the Southeast.
- Museum of Industry
- Voices of Pensacola Multicultural Center
- Old Christ Church
- Bowden Building: The lower floor houses classrooms used by the University of West Florida and some of Historic Pensacola's collections. The upper floor houses Historic Pensacola's administration offices.
- Tivoli High House: Historic boarding house now used as a ticket office
- Lavalle House
- Lear-Rocheblave House: Historic home restored to a 1920s boarding house
- Dorr House
- Manuel Barrios Cottage
- Julee Cottage: a historic home, formerly owned by Julee Panton, a free woman of color and other black families
- Barkley House
- John Appleyard Cottage
- Fountain Park
- Colonial Archaeological Trail
- Pensacola Museum of Art

=== Image gallery ===
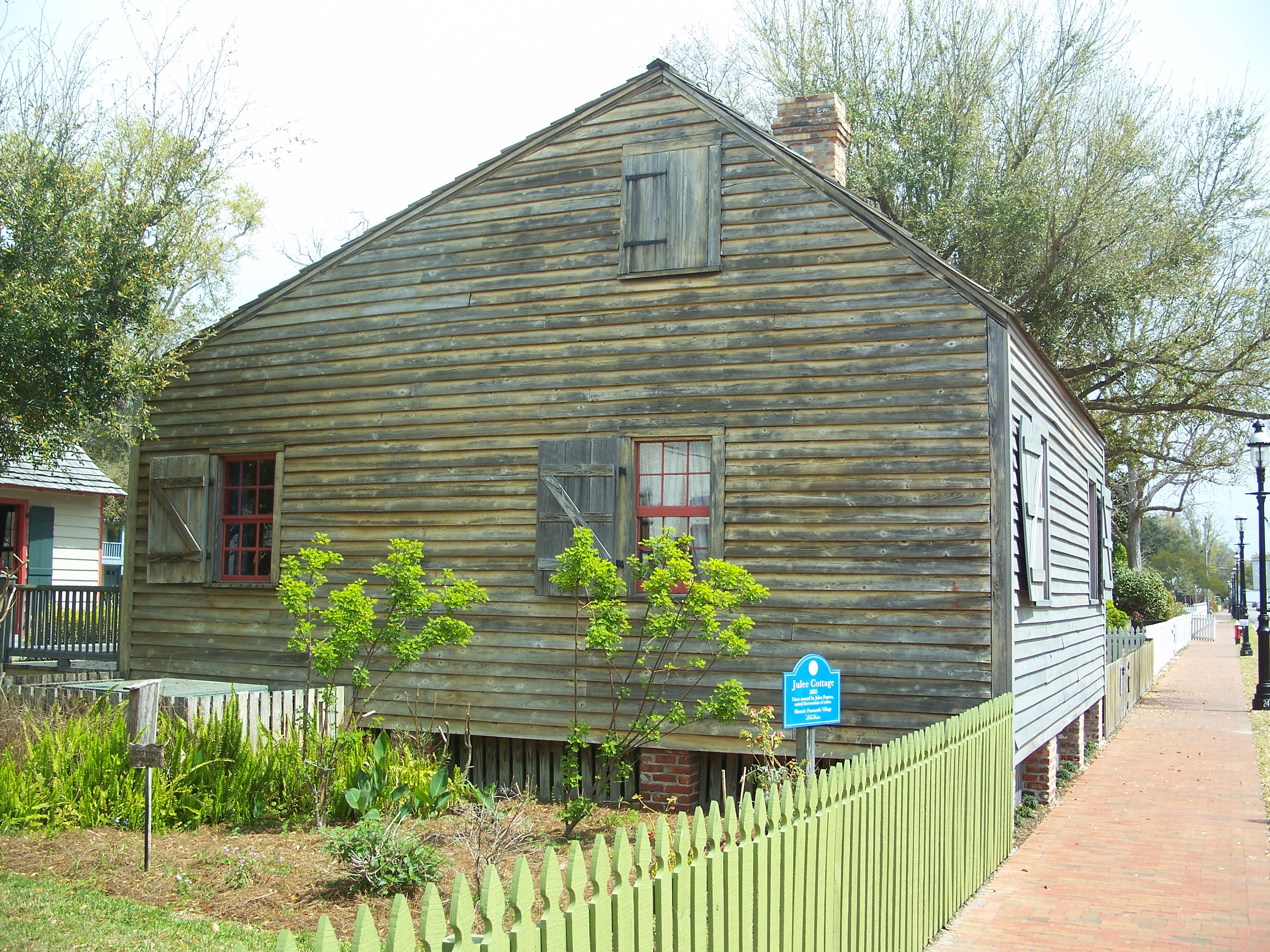
Julee Cottage, 1805

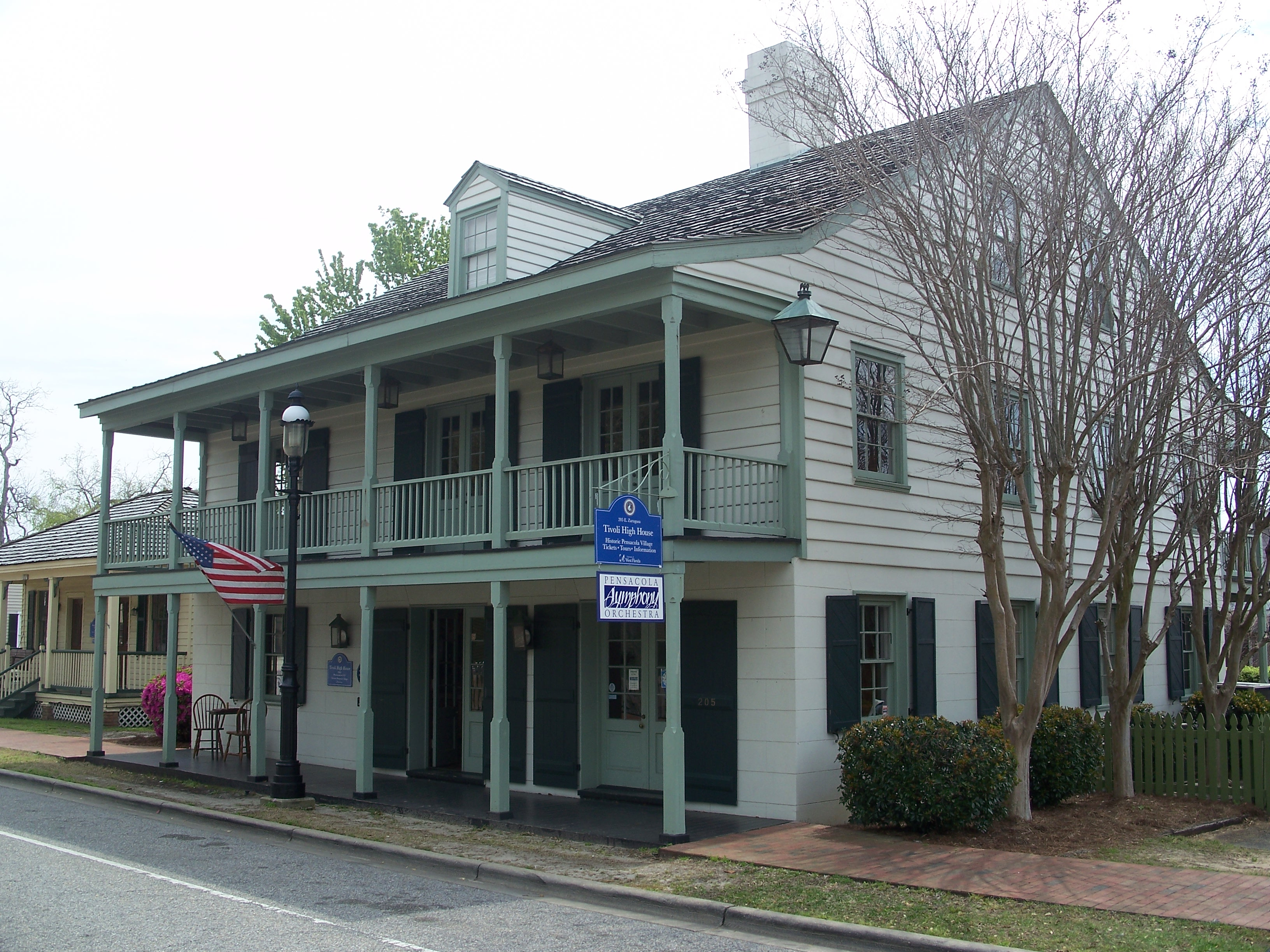
Tivoli House, 1976 replica of 1805 building

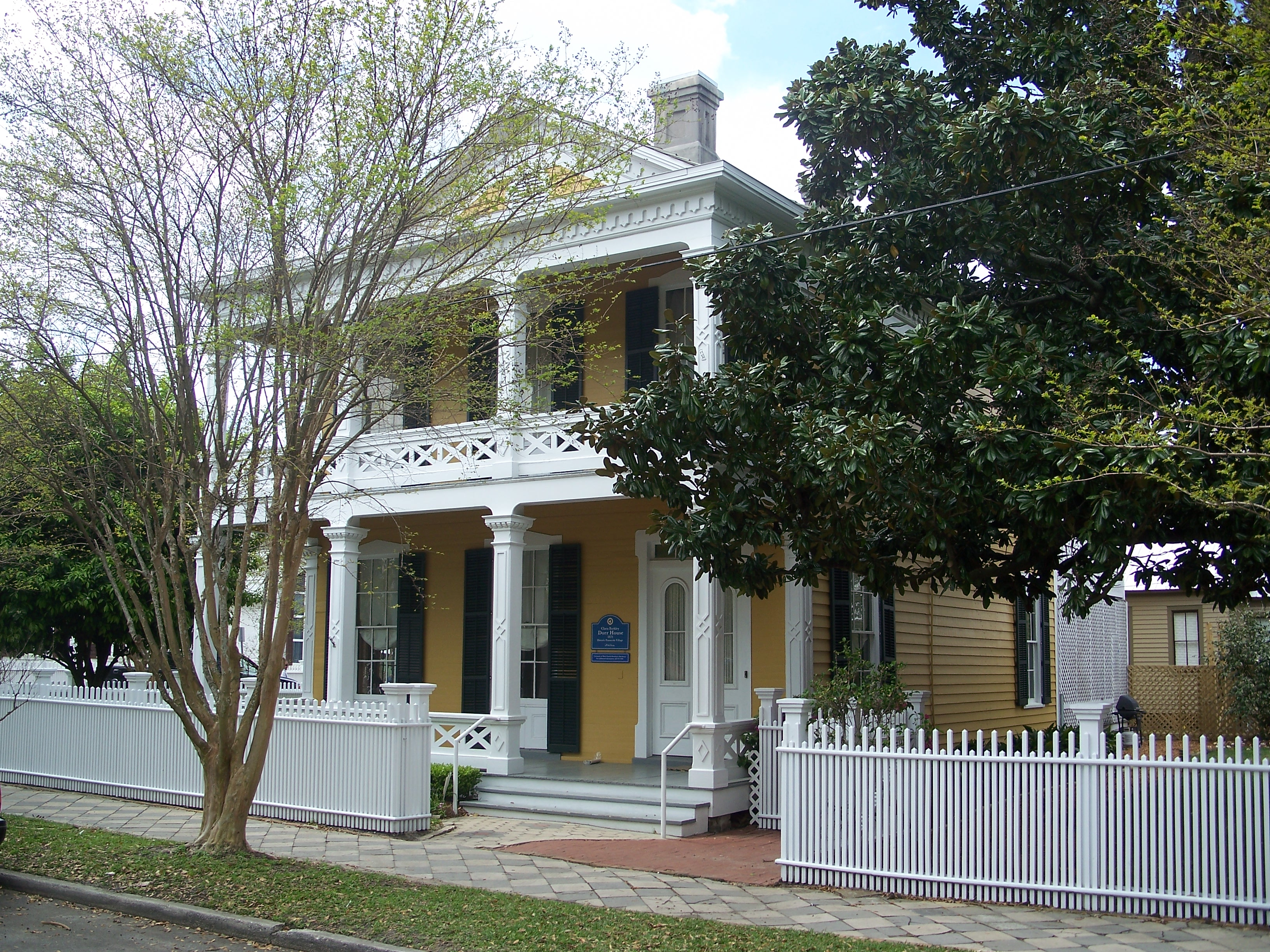
Clara Barkley Dorr House, 1871, residence of UWF president

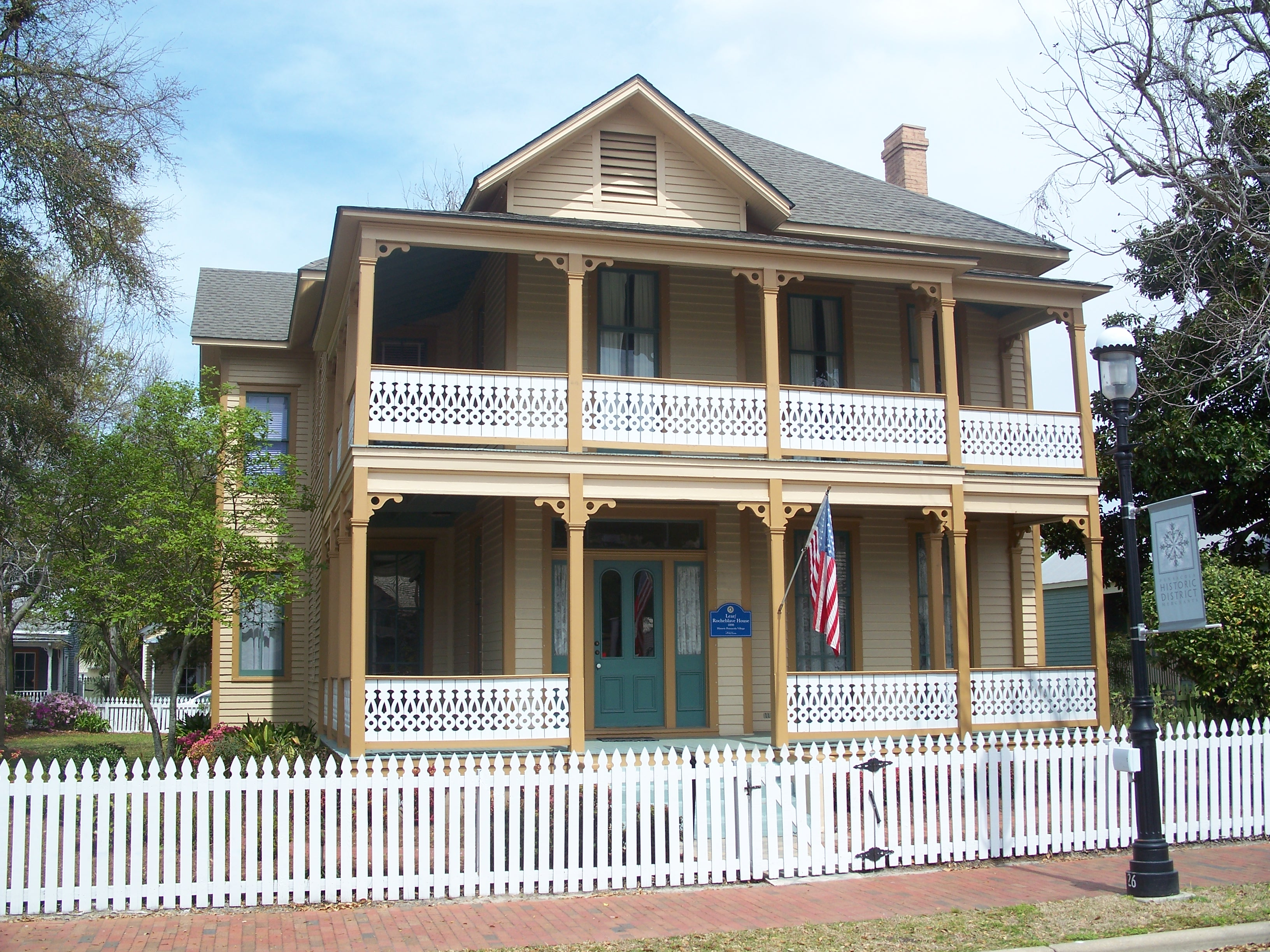
Lear Rocheblave House, 1890

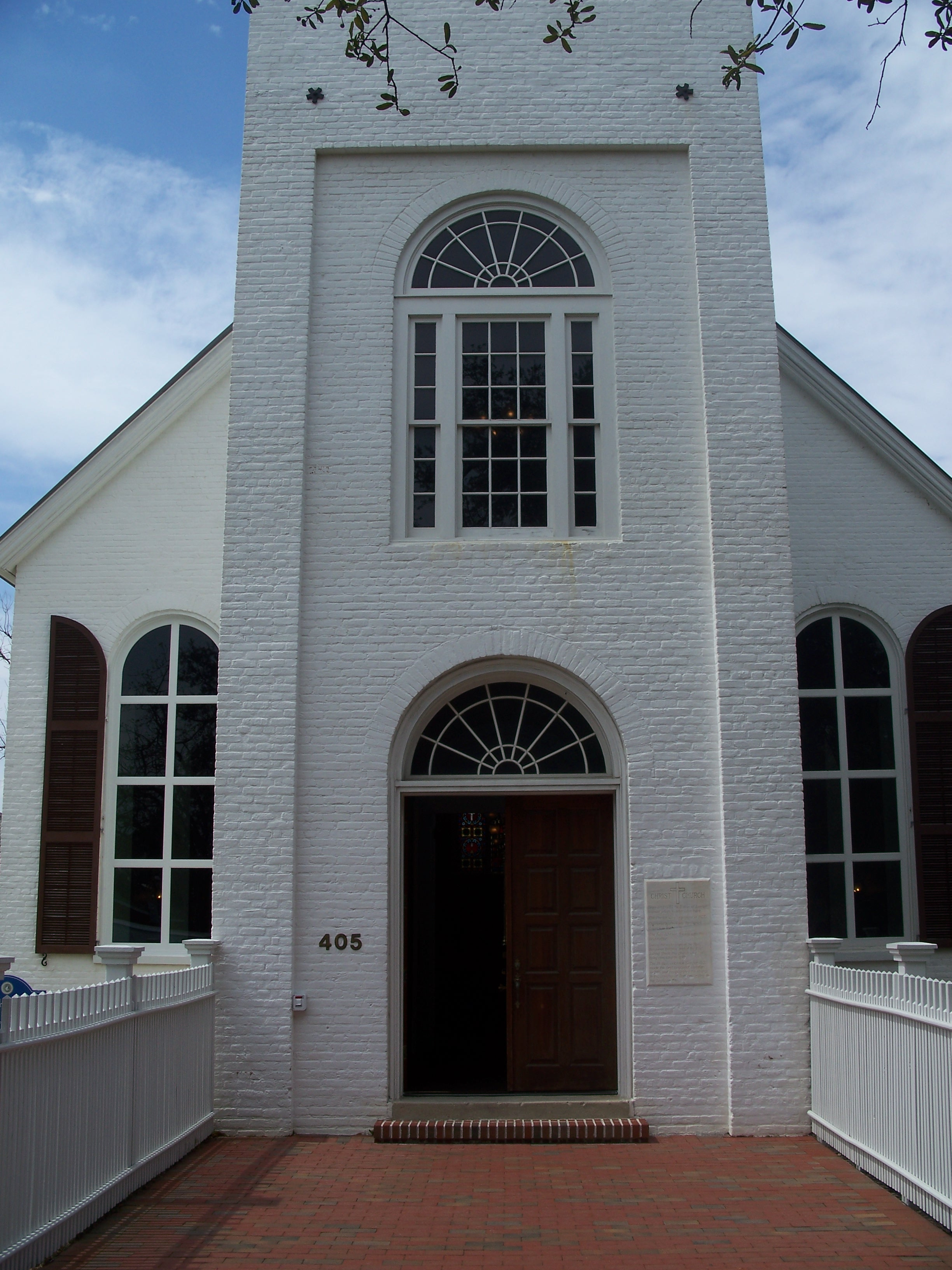
Old Christ Church, 1763

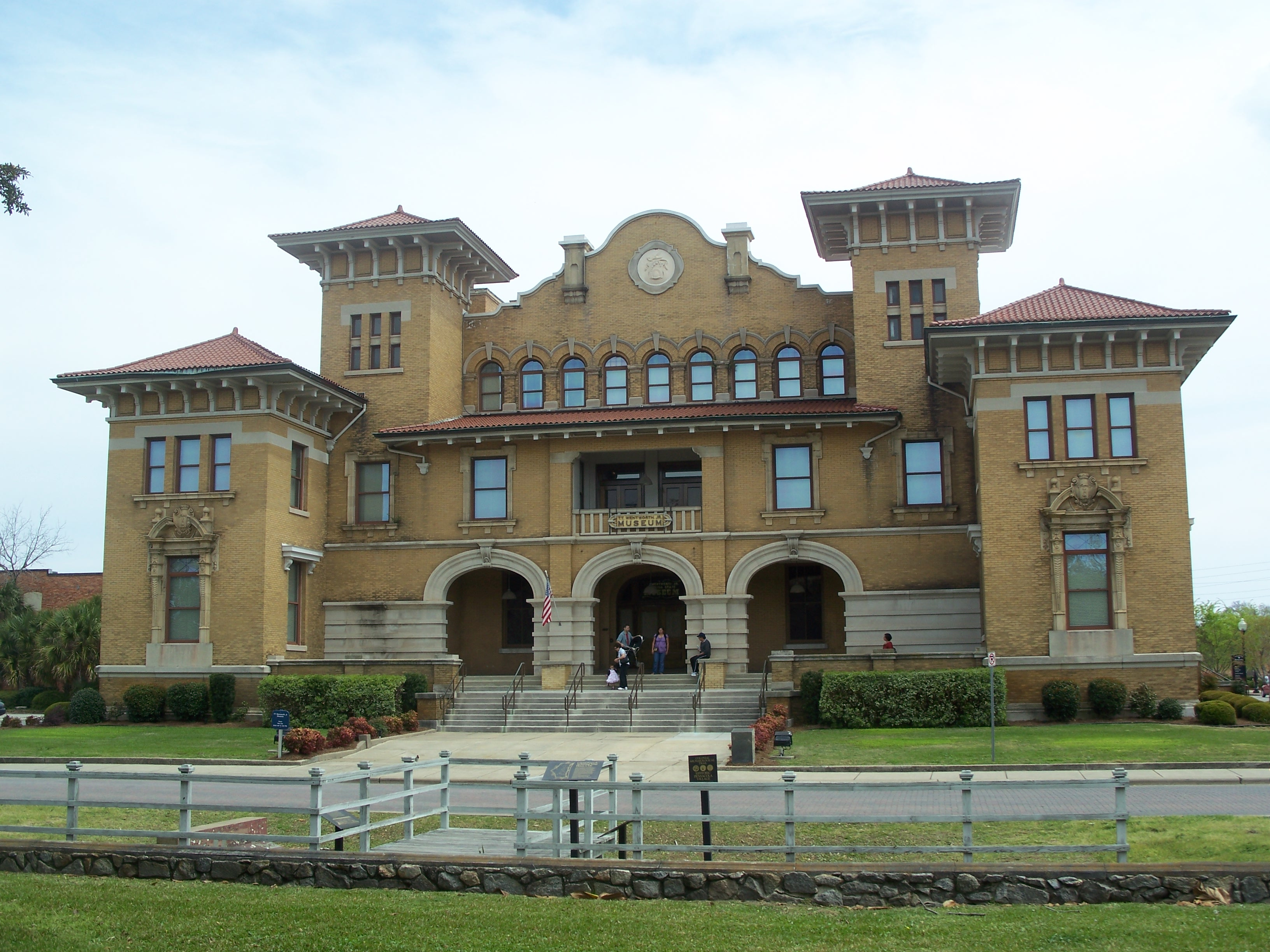
Pensacola Museum of History

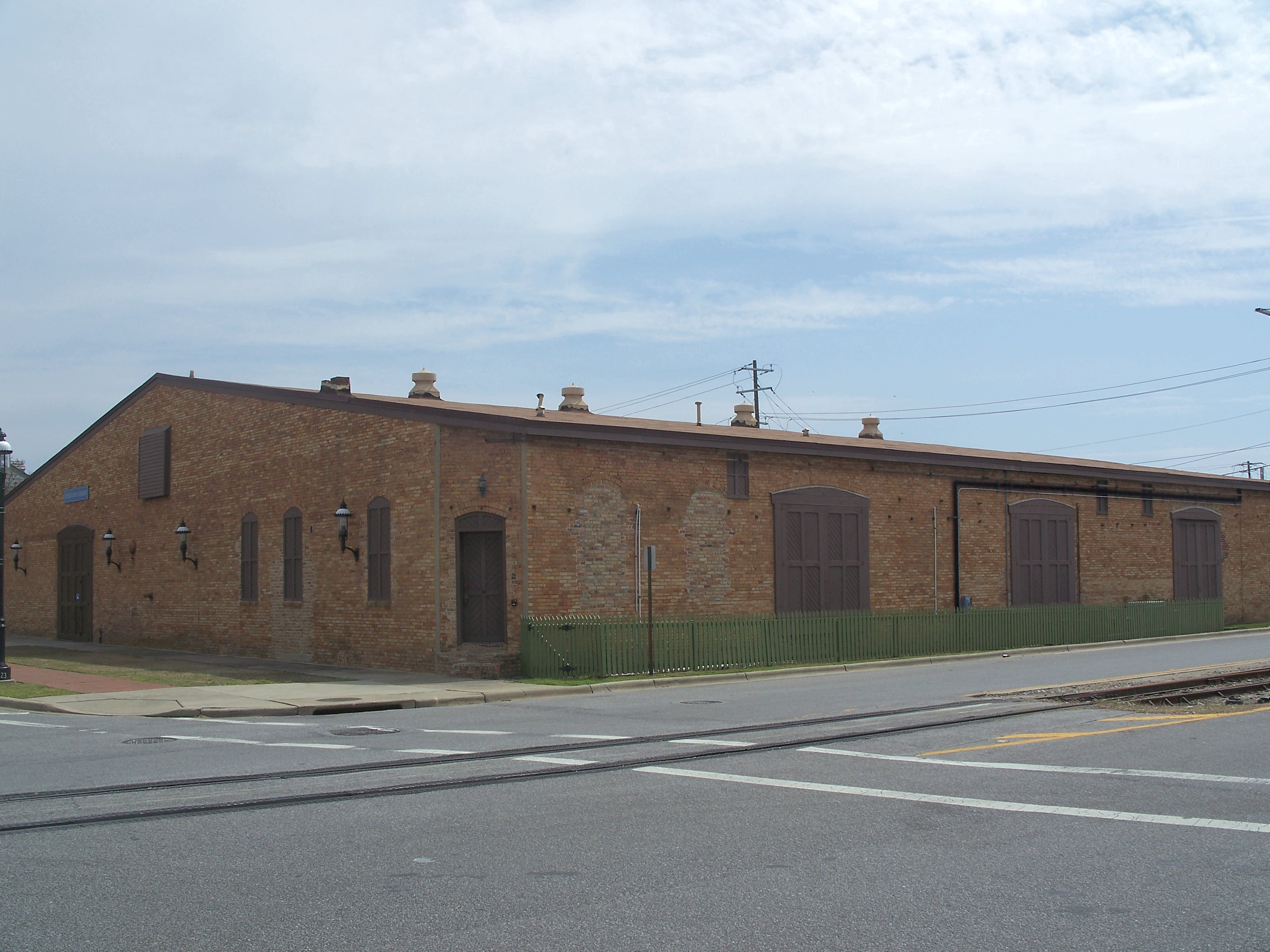
Museum of Commerce

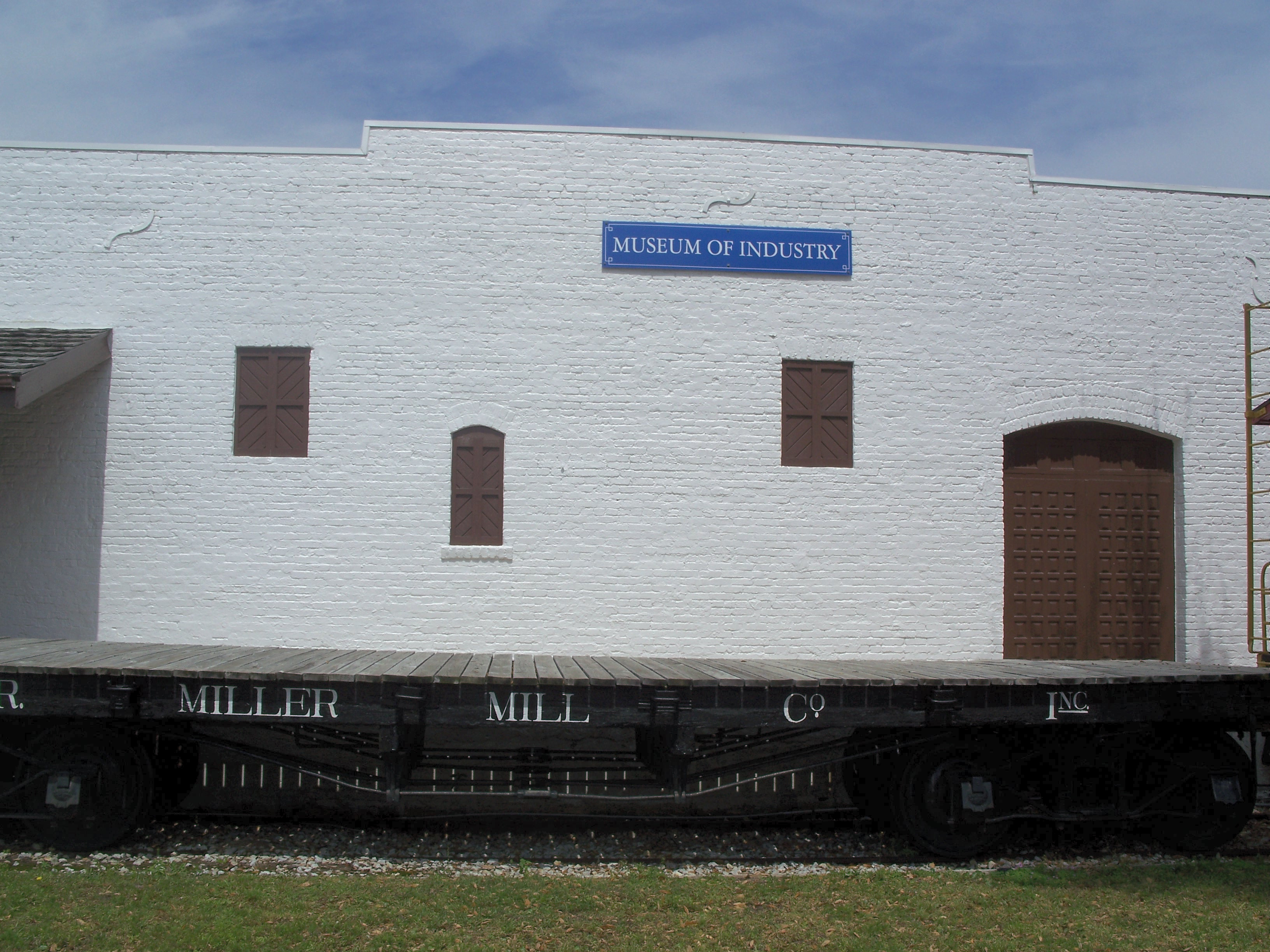
Museum of Industry
