= 2025 Florida's 1st congressional district special election =

Special election following the resignation of Matt Gaetz

- April 1, 2025

Florida's 1st congressional district
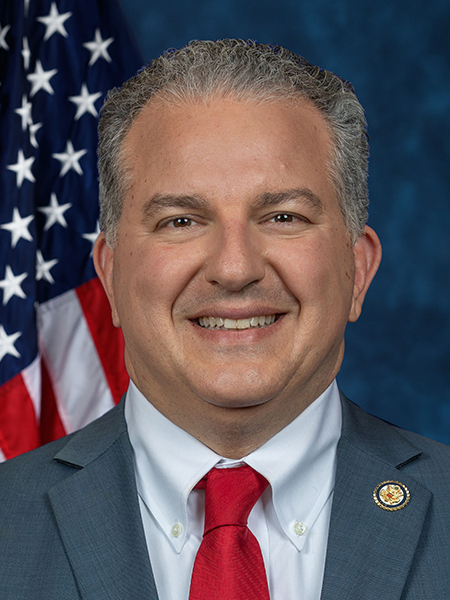

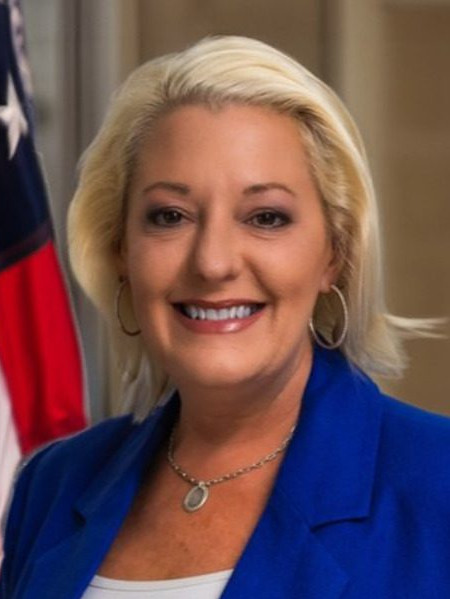
Nominee	Jimmy Patronis	Gay Valimont
Party	Republican	Democratic
Popular vote	97,370	72,375
Percentage	56.86%	42.26%
- Patronis: 40–50% 50–60% 60–70% 70–80% 80–90% 90%+ Valimont: 40–50% 50–60% 60–70% 70–80% 80–90% 90%+
U.S. Representative before election
Matt Gaetz
Republican
Elected U.S. Representative
Jimmy Patronis
Republican

The 2025 Florida's 1st congressional district special election was held on April 1, 2025, to fill a vacant seat in Florida's 1st congressional district previously occupied by Matt Gaetz, who resigned on November 13, 2024, after president-elect Donald Trump nominated him for attorney general of the United States. Gaetz later withdrew his nomination for attorney general on November 21. The following day, Gaetz announced he would not return to Congress. He had been reelected for a sixth term earlier in the month, but declined to take his seat. It was considered a safe Republican district.

The election was held alongside a concurrent special election for Florida's 6th congressional district. The race was called for Patronis almost immediately after polls closed. Despite Patronis' victory, Democrats significantly improved their margins in this election, overperforming their 2024 result by 17.4 percentage points and flipping Escambia County, Valimont's home county and home to the district's largest city, Pensacola. Valimont became the first Democrat running for this district to win the county since Earl Hutto in 1992. This is the strongest Democratic performance since Hutto's retirement in 1994; no Democrat since then had managed as much as 40 percent of the vote.

== District profile ==
The 1st district takes in the westernmost area of the Florida panhandle, encompassing Escambia, Santa Rosa, and Okaloosa counties, as well as about half of Walton County. A significant portion of the district's population are servicemen and women of the U.S. military, due in large part to the Naval Air Station near Pensacola, Eglin AFB near Niceville, and the nearby commuter towns of Navarre and Fort Walton Beach.

The district was given a Cook Partisan Voting Index rating of R+19 in 2022, making it the most Republican district in Florida. In the 2024 presidential election, Donald Trump won the district with 68.1%, while then-incumbent Gaetz was re-elected with 66.0% of the vote in 2024.

== Republican primary ==
=== Candidates ===
==== Nominee ====
- Jimmy Patronis, former chief financial officer of Florida (2017–2025)

==== Eliminated in primary ====
- Aaron Dimmock, director for leadership programs at the University of West Florida's AWKO Center for Leadership and candidate for this district in 2024
- Kevin Gaffney, teacher
- Jeff Macey, software engineer
- Greg Merk, pilot and candidate for this district in 2020 and 2022
- John Mills, businessman and candidate for this district in 2016, 2018, 2020, and 2022
- Jeff Peacock, former policy director for U.S. representative Lee Zeldin
- Joel Rudman, former state representative from the 3rd district (2022–2025)
- Michael Dylan Thompson, attorney
- Gene Valentino, former Escambia County commissioner

==== Withdrawn ====
- John Frankman, former Green Beret (endorsed Patronis)
- Keith Gross, former assistant state attorney for Florida's 18th circuit court and candidate for U.S. Senate in 2024 (endorsed Patronis)
- Nathan Nelson, former director of military affairs for Matt Gaetz (endorsed Patronis)
- Michelle Salzman, state representative from the 1st district (2020–present) (endorsed Patronis)
- Jeff Witt, pilot (endorsed Patronis)

==== Declined ====
- Alex Andrade, state representative from the 2nd district (2018–present)
- Doug Broxson, former state senator from the 1st district (2016–2024)
- Don Gaetz, state senator from the 1st district (2006–2016, 2024–present), former president of the Florida Senate (2012–2014), and father of Matt Gaetz
- Matt Gaetz, former U.S. representative from this district (2017–2024)
- Bernadette Pittman, construction company CEO (endorsed Rudman)
- D. C. Reeves, Mayor of Pensacola (2022–present)
- Frank White, former state representative from the 2nd district (2016–2018) (endorsed Patronis)

=== Endorsements ===
Jimmy Patronis

Executive branch officials

- Donald Trump, 45th and 47th president of the United States (2017–2021, 2025–present)

U.S. representatives

- Mike Johnson, Speaker of the United States House of Representatives (2023–present) from Louisiana's 4th congressional district (2017–present)

State legislators

- Michelle Salzman, state representative from the 1st district (2020–present)
- Frank White, former state representative from the 2nd district (2016–2018)

County sheriffs

- Eric Aden, Okaloosa County (2021–present)
- Michael Adkinson Jr., Walton County (2009–present)
- Bob Johnson, Santa Rosa County (2017–present)
- Chip Simmons, Escambia County (2021–present)

Organizations

- Americans for Prosperity Action Florida
- Veterans for America First
Gene Valentino

Executive branch officials

- Tom Homan, White House Executive Associate Director of Enforcement and Removal Operations (2025–present)
Jeff Witt (withdrawn)

Executive branch officials

- Robert Wilkie, former U.S. Secretary of Veterans Affairs (2018–2021)

Individuals

- Stanley Clarke, former director of the Air National Guard (2013–2015)
Declined to endorse

U.S. representatives

- Matt Gaetz, former U.S. representative from this district (2017–2024)

State legislators

- Don Gaetz, state senator from the 1st district (2006–2016, 2024–present), former president of the Florida Senate (2012–2014), and father of Matt Gaetz

=== Results ===
Republican primary results by county: Patronis: 60–70%; 70–80%

Republican primary results
Party	Candidate	Votes	%
Republican	Jimmy Patronis	33,742	65.74%
Republican	Joel Rudman	5,099	9.93%
Republican	Aaron Dimmock	3,423	6.67%
Republican	Gene Valentino	3,093	6.03%
Republican	Michael Dylan Thompson	2,548	4.96%
Republican	Greg Merk	1,287	2.51%
Republican	Jeff Peacock	743	1.45%
Republican	Kevin J. Gaffney	634	1.24%
Republican	John Mills	574	1.12%
Republican	Jeff Macey	187	0.36%
Total votes		51,330	100.00%

== Democratic primary ==
=== Candidates ===
==== Nominee ====
- Gay Valimont, athletic trainer and nominee for this district in 2024

=== Endorsements ===
Gay Valimont

Organizations

- Everytown for Gun Safety

== Others ==
=== Independents ===
==== Declared ====
- Stephen Broden, pastor, Constitution Party nominee for vice president in 2024, and Republican nominee for Texas's 30th congressional district in 2010

=== Write-in candidates ===
==== Declared ====
- Richard Paul Dembinsky, engineer and perennial candidate
- Stanley Gray, retiree
- Jonathan Green, mediator
- Stan McDaniels, landscaping contractor

== General election ==
=== Fundraising ===
Campaign finance reports as of March 12, 2025
Candidate	Raised	Spent	Cash on hand
Jimmy Patronis (R)	$2,126,409 (Note: $12,000 of this total was self-funded by Patronis)	$1,311,824	$814,585
Gay Valimont (D)	$6,484,474	$4,315,536	$2,177,181
Source: Federal Election Commission

=== Results ===
2025 Florida's 1st congressional district special election results
Party	Candidate	Votes	%
Republican	Jimmy Patronis	97,370	56.86%
Democratic	Gay Valimont	72,375	42.26%
Independent	Stephen Broden	1,384	0.81%
Write-ins		119	0.07%
Total votes		171,248	100.00%
Republican hold			

==== By County ====
County	Jimmy Patronis Republican		Gay Valimont Democratic		Stephen Broden Independent		Margin		Total votes cast
County	#	%	#	%	#	%	#	%	Total votes cast
Escambia	35,849	48.10%	38,126	51.16%	520	0.70%	2,277	3.06%	74,530
Okaloosa	26,047	60.78%	16,407	38.28%	375	0.88%	9,640	22.50%	42,857
Santa Rosa	27,038	63.90%	14,774	34.92%	443	1.05%	12,264	28.98%	42,310
Walton	8,436	73.03%	3,068	26.56%	46	0.40%	5,368	46.47%	11,551
Totals	97,370	56.86%	72,375	42.26%	1,384	0.81%	24,995	14.60%	171,248

== See also ==
- 2025 United States House of Representatives elections
- List of special elections to the United States House of Representatives
