= Grover Robinson =

Grover Robinson may refer to:

- Grover Robinson III (1943–2000), member of the Florida House of Representatives
- Grover Robinson IV, former Mayor of Pensacola, Florida
