= Grover Robinson IV =

American politician and real estate developer

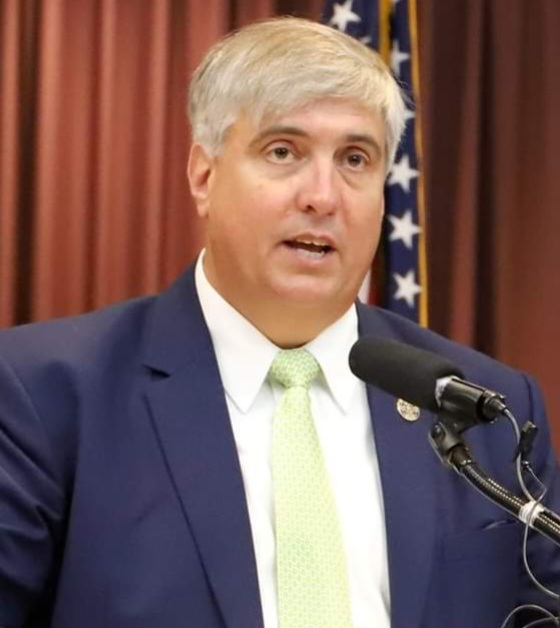
- Robinson in 2021

63rd Mayor of Pensacola
- In office November 27, 2018 – November 22, 2022
- Preceded by: Ashton Hayward
- Succeeded by: D. C. Reeves

Escambia County District 4 Commissioner
- In office November 2006 – November 2018
- Preceded by: Tom Banjanin
- Succeeded by: Robert Bender

Personal details
- Born: Grover C. Robinson IV Pensacola, Florida, U.S.
- Party: Republican
- Spouse: Jill Warren Robinson
- Children: 2
- Parent: Grover Robinson III (father)
- Profession: Real estate developer, politician
- Awards: Joe Oldmixon Service Award, Presidential Advocate Award, Leadership Pensacola

Grover Cleveland Robinson IV is an American politician and real estate developer who served as the 63rd mayor of Pensacola from 2018 to 2022.

== Early life and education ==
Grover Cleveland Robinson IV was born in Pensacola, Florida. His parents, Grover Robinson III and Sandra Lowrey Robinson, died in a helicopter crash while vacationing in New Zealand on March 28, 2000. His father, who was a lawyer and real estate company founder, was the state representative for Florida's 1st district from 1972 to 1982 and the 3rd district from 1982 to 1986. In 1989, Robinson's 15-year-old sister, Lowrey Robinson, was killed in an automobile accident near Greenville, Alabama. In 1992, Robinson obtained a Bachelor of Economics degree from Birmingham–Southern College.

== Political career ==
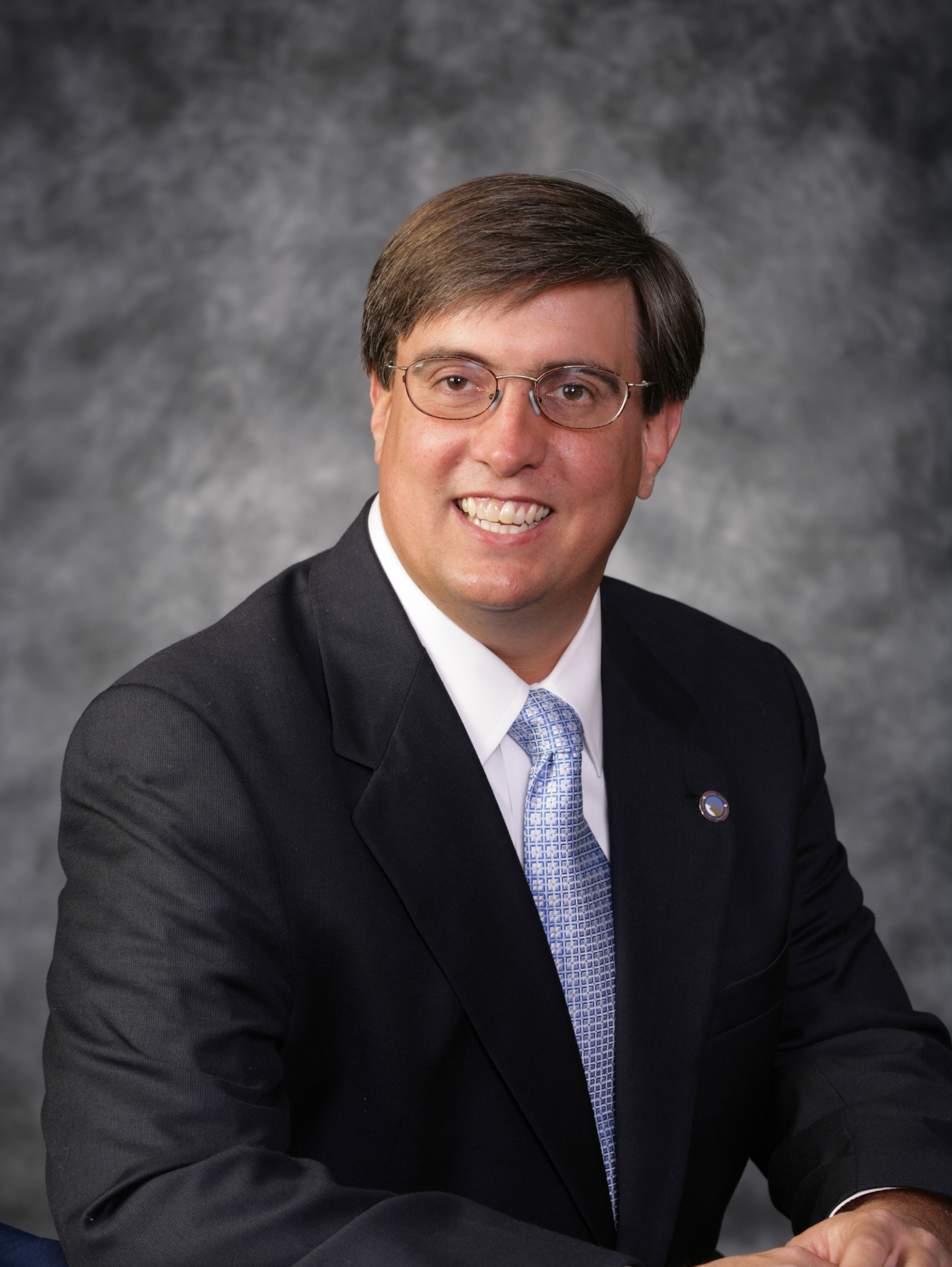
Official portrait, 2006

Robinson was the commissioner of Escambia County district 4 from November 2006 to November 2018. He was elected mayor of Pensacola on November 27, 2018, after a runoff election against city councilman Brian Spencer. On March 29, 2021, Robinson announced he would not seek a second term in 2022. He was succeeded by D. C. Reeves, who took office on November 22, 2022.

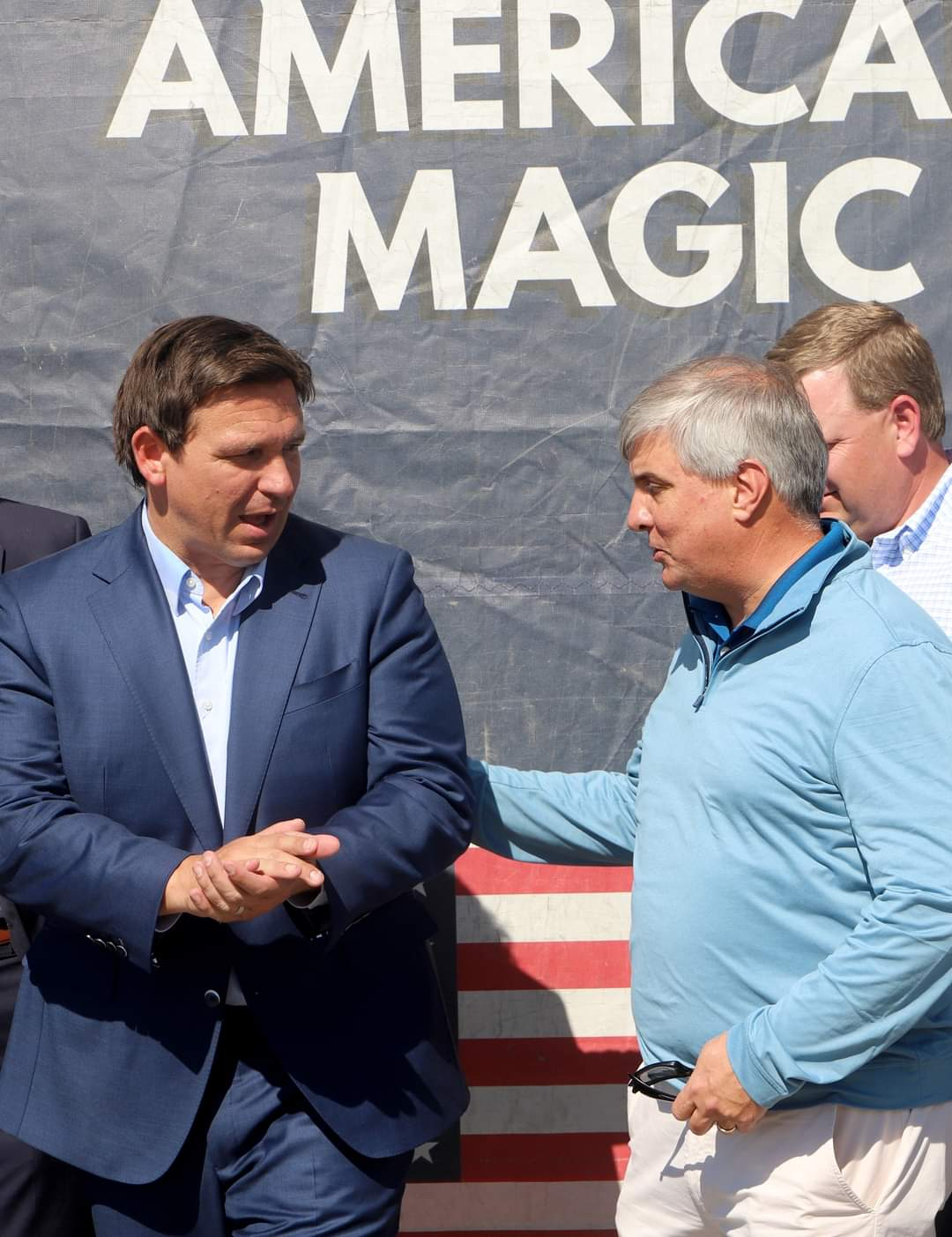
Robinson with Governor Ron DeSantis in November 2022

== See also ==
- List of mayors of Pensacola, Florida
