= Warren Briggs =

Warren Briggs may refer to:

- Warren R. Briggs (1850–1933), American architect
- Warren M. Briggs (1923–2012), member of the Florida House of Representatives
