= Peaden =

Peaden is a surname. Notable people with the surname include:

- Durell Peaden (1945–2015), American politician from Florida
- R. W. Peaden (1933–1999), American politician from Florida
