= Holly Benson =

American politician

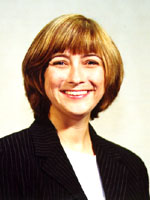

Member of the Florida House of Representatives from the 3rd district
- In office November 7, 2000 – December 31, 2006
- Preceded by: DeeDee Ritchie
- Succeeded by: Clay Ford

Personal details
- Born: June 4, 1971 (age 55) Camp Lejeune, North Carolina
- Party: Republican
- Education: Dartmouth College (AB); University of Florida (JD)

Anna Holliday "Holly" Benson (born June 4, 1971) is a former member of the Florida House of Representatives.

== Personal background ==
Benson was born in Camp Lejeune, North Carolina and moved to Pensacola, Florida in 1976. She is a graduate of Pensacola's Booker T. Washington High School (1989), Dartmouth College (A.B., 1993) and the Fredric G. Levin College of Law at the University of Florida (J.D., 1996). Benson was employed as a municipal bond lawyer, prior to her appointment to the Department of Business and Professional Regulation in December 2006.

== Florida House of Representatives ==
Benson was elected in November 2000 to the Florida House of Representatives. Benson was the first Republican elected to the District 3 seat, succeeding Democrat DeeDee Ritchie.

During her time as a representative, Benson served as the Chair of the Health and Families Council, as well as Co-Chair of the Select Committee on Medicaid Reform. Benson also chaired the Select Committee on Article V, which was tasked with implementing a 1998 constitutional amendment that required a major overhaul of the Florida state court system.

On December 28, 2006, Florida's Governor-elect Charlie Crist appointed Benson to the position of Secretary of the Florida Department of Business and Professional Regulation. On December 31, 2006, Benson resigned from the Florida House of Representatives, ending her legislative service to the State of Florida.

=== Previous council and committee memberships ===
- Health and Family Council (chair)
- Select Committee on Medicaid Reform (co-chair)
- Fiscal Council
- Governmental Operations Committee
- Growth Management Committee
- Health Care Appropriations Committee
- Rules and Calendar Council

== Subsequent political career ==
In February, 2008, Florida Governor Charlie Crist appointed Benson to the position of Secretary of the Florida Agency for Health Care Administration. She resigned in October 2009.

Benson ran for the Republican nomination during the 2010 Florida Attorney General election, however did not make it past the primary stage.

Florida House of Representatives
Preceded by DeeDee Ritchie	Member of the Florida House of Representatives from the 3rd district 2000–2006	Succeeded by Clay Ford
