= Gordon Tyrrell =

American politician

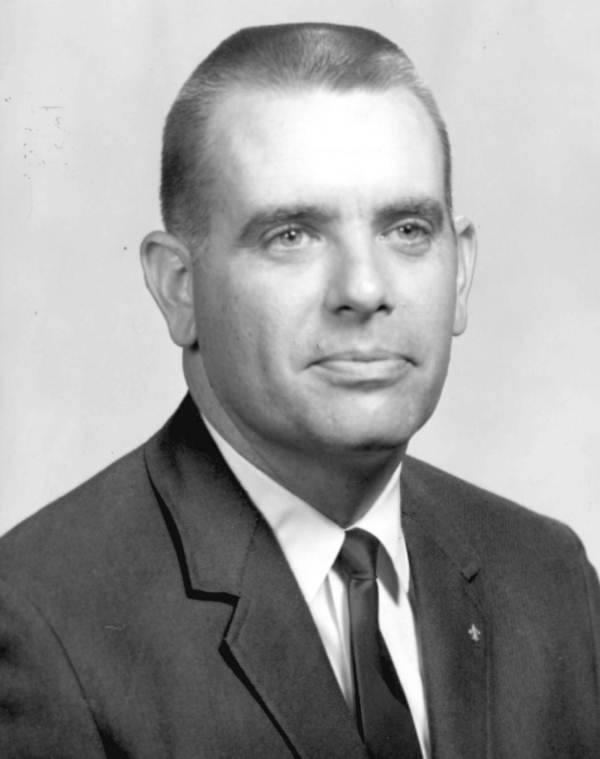

Member of the Florida House of Representatives from the 2nd district
- In office November 5, 1968 – November 7, 1972
- Preceded by: Warren M. Briggs
- Succeeded by: R. W. Peaden

Personal details
- Born: June 8, 1932 (age 94) Mobile, Alabama, U.S.
- Party: Democratic
- Spouse: Rose Marie Tyrrell
- Education: Florida State University
- Occupation: business executive

Gordon Woodyard Tyrrell (born June 8, 1932) is a politician in the American state of Florida. He served in the Florida House of Representatives from November 5, 1968, to November 7, 1972, representing the 2nd district.
