= Tom Banjanin =

American politician

Member of the Florida House of Representatives from the 3rd district
- In office 1986–1992
- Preceded by: Grover Robinson III
- Succeeded by: Buzz Ritchie

Personal details
- Born: February 22, 1942 (age 84) St. Louis, Missouri, U.S.
- Party: Republican
- Spouse: Peggy Banjanin
- Children: 1
- Education: Washington University; George Washington University

Tom Banjanin (born February 22, 1942) is an American politician. He served as a Republican member for the 3rd district of the Florida House of Representatives.

== Life and career ==
Banjanin was born in St. Louis, Missouri. He attended Washington University in St. Louis and George Washington University.

In 1986, Banjanin was elected to represent the 3rd district of the Florida House of Representatives, succeeding Grover Robinson III. He served until 1992, when he was succeeded by Buzz Ritchie.
