= 2022 Pensacola mayoral election =

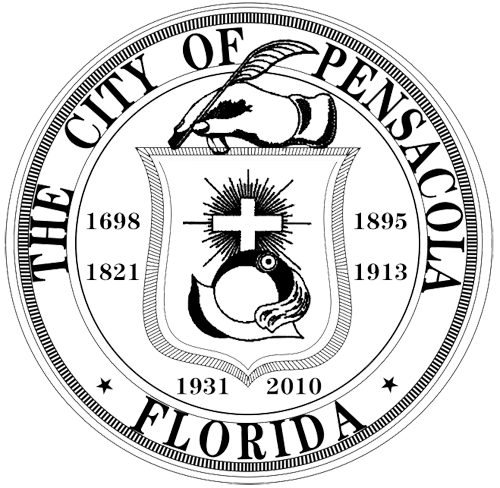
- August 23, 2022
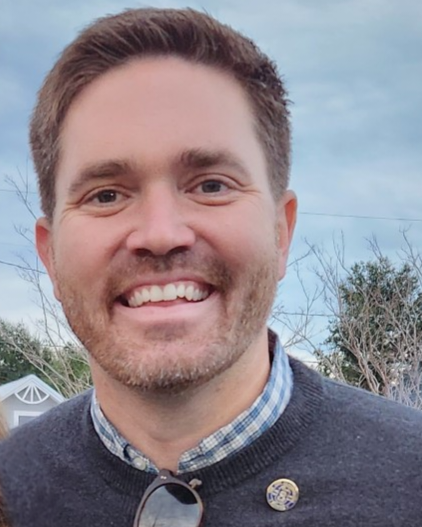

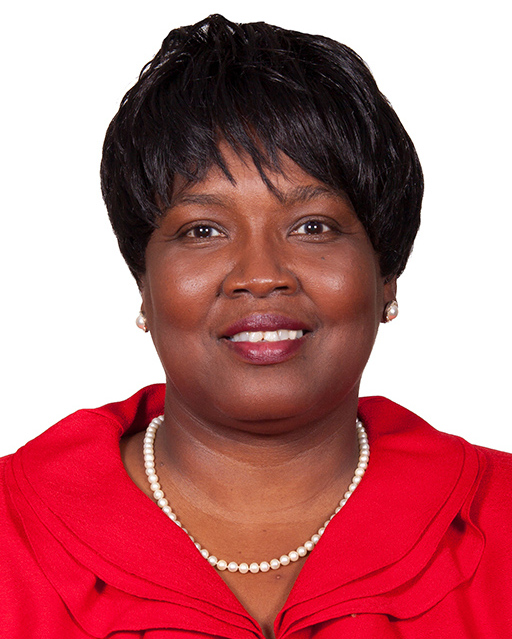

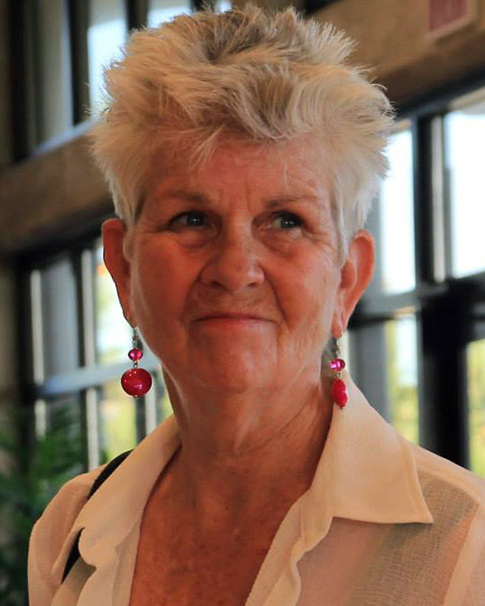
Candidate	D. C. Reeves	Jewel Cannada-Wynn
Popular vote	7,682	3,003
Percentage	51.11%	19.98%
Candidate	Steve Sharp	Sherri Myers
Popular vote	2,408	1,936
Percentage	16.02%	12.88%
Mayor before election
Grover Robinson IV
Republican
Elected Mayor
D. C. Reeves
Republican

The 2022 Pensacola mayoral election took place on August 23, 2022, to elect the mayor of Pensacola. Local entrepreneur and businessman D. C. Reeves was elected during the primary by earning the majority, 7,682 votes (51.11%), against three opponents, Jewell Cannada-Wynn, Sherri Myers and Steven Sharp. Because Reeves earned the majority in the primary, there was no runoff on November 8, and Reeves took office on November 22, when incumbent Mayor Grover Robinson IV stepped down after one term. At age 38, Reeves became the youngest Pensacolian to hold the office in 101 years.

== Candidates ==
- Jewel Cannada-Wynn, former city councilmember, dean at Escambia High School
- James Hillburn (did not qualify)
- Tim Horton, U.S. Navy veteran, businessman (did not qualify)
- David Morgan (withdrawn), former sheriff of Escambia County
- Sherri Myers, councilmember
- D. C. Reeves, businessman, chairman of the board for Visit Pensacola
- Andy Romagnano (withdrawn)
- Steve Sharp, former division chief of the Protection Services Department of the Escambia County School District, former deputy sheriff, former firefighter

== Debates ==
On March 15, 2022, the East Hill Neighborhood Association hosted a forum with candidates Cannada-Wynn, Hillburn, Horton, Reeves, and Sharp.

On May 26, 2022, Women for Responsible Legislation hosted a forum with candidates Cannada-Wynn, Myers, Reeves, and Sharp.

== Results ==
2022 Pensacola mayoral primary election
Candidate	Votes	%
D. C. Reeves	7,680	51.13%
Jewel Cannada-Wynn	3,000	19.97%
Steve Sharp	2,407	16.02%
Sherri Myers	1,935	12.88%
Total votes	15,022	100.0%

== See also ==
- 2022 Florida elections
