= Phil Ashler =

American politician

Philip Frederic Ashler
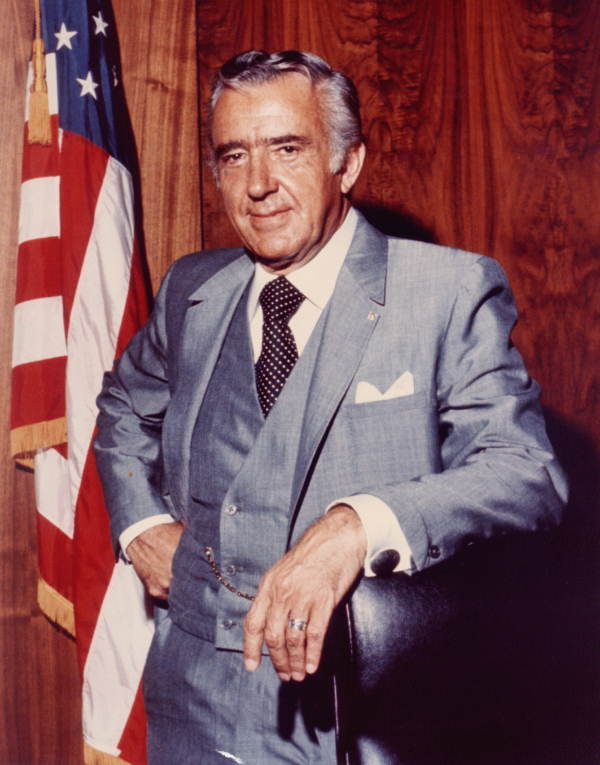
- Ashler in 1975

Member of the Florida House of Representatives from Escambia County
- In office 1963–1967

Member of the Florida House of Representatives from the 3rd district
- In office 1967–1968
- Preceded by: District established
- Succeeded by: Tom Tobiassen

Treasurer of Florida
- In office 1975–1976
- Governor: Reubin Askew
- Preceded by: Thomas D. O'Malley Jr.
- Succeeded by: Bill Gunter

Personal details
- Born: October 15, 1914 New York, U.S.
- Died: April 27, 2009 (aged 94)
- Party: Democratic
- Education: St. John's College; Harvard University

Phil Ashler (October 15, 1914 – April 27, 2009) was an American politician. He served as a Democratic member for the 3rd district of the Florida House of Representatives.

== Life and career ==
Ashler was born in New York. He received his Bachelor of Business Administration from St. John's College and his Master of Business Administration from Harvard Business School.

In 1963, Ashler was elected to the Florida House of Representatives. In 1967, he was elected as the first representative for the newly-established 3rd district. He served until 1968, when he was succeeded by Tom Tobiassen.

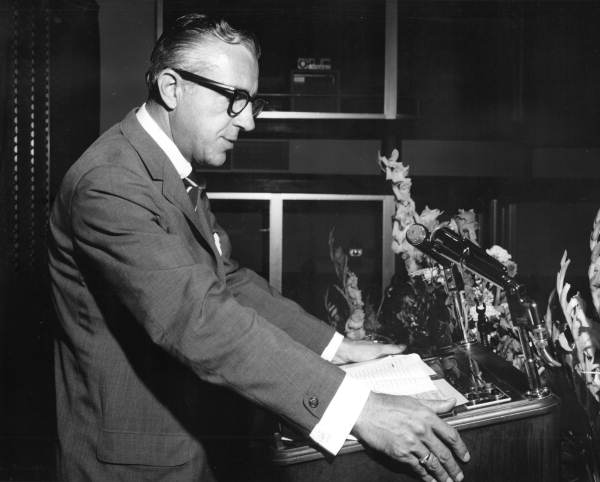
Ashler in 1967

Ashler served as treasurer of Florida from 1975 to 1976.

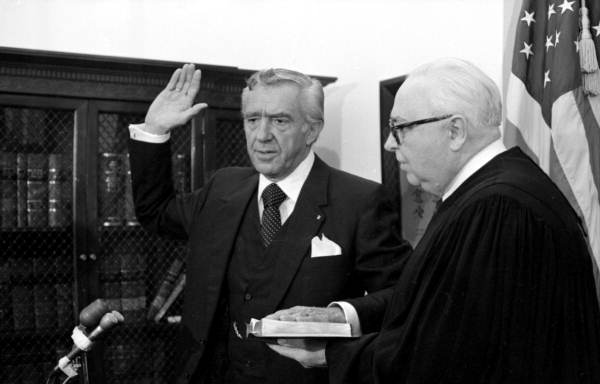
Ashler (left) with B. K. Roberts, 1975

Ashler died on April 27, 2009 in Tallahassee, Florida, at the age of 94.
