= Tom Patterson (Florida politician) =

American politician

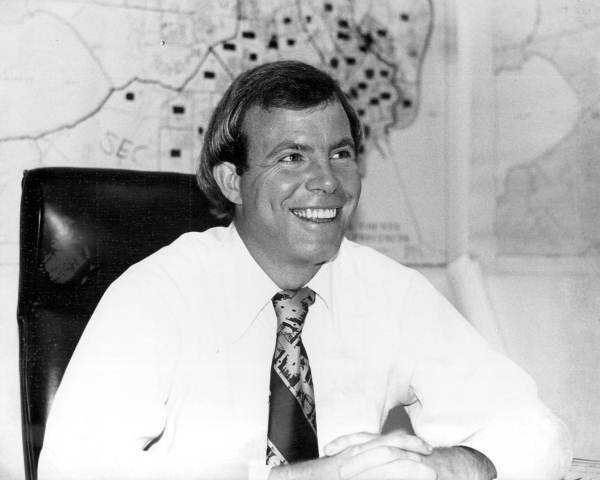

Member of the Florida House of Representatives from the 2nd district
- In office November 2, 1976 – November 2, 1982
- Preceded by: R. W. Peaden
- Succeeded by: Ginger Wetherell

Personal details
- Born: May 6, 1943 (age 83) East Lansing, Michigan
- Party: Democratic
- Education: Western Michigan University
- Occupation: business consultant

Thomas R. Patterson (born May 6, 1943) was an American politician in the state of Florida.

Patterson was born in Michigan and moved to Florida in 1965. He served in the Florida House of Representatives for the 2nd district from November 2, 1976, to November 2, 1982, as a Democrat.
