= Clyde Hagler =

American politician

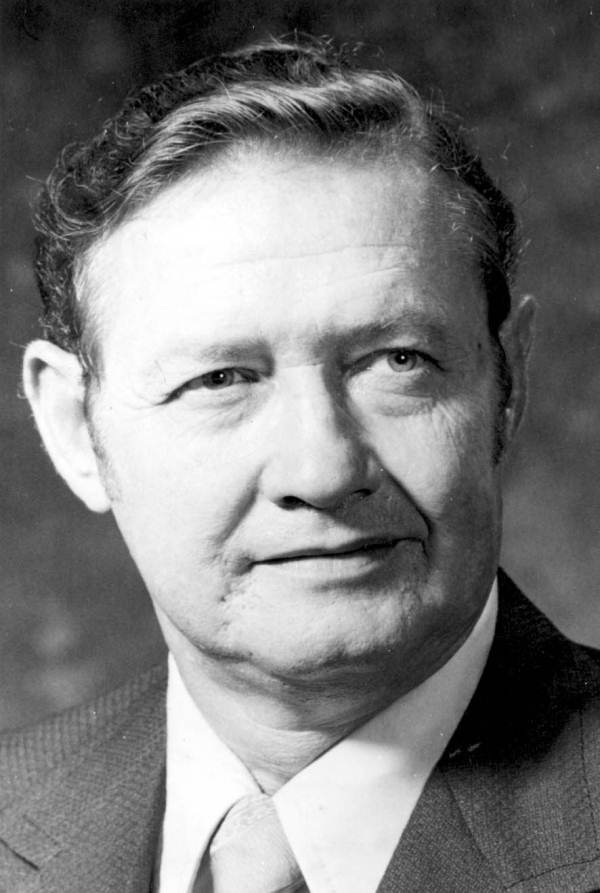
- Hagler in 1980

Member of the Florida House of Representatives from the 3rd district
- In office 1974–1982
- Preceded by: Tom Tobiassen
- Succeeded by: Grover Robinson III

Personal details
- Born: June 20, 1930 Pensacola, Florida, U.S.
- Died: January 26, 1984 (aged 53)
- Party: Democratic

Clyde H. Hagler (June 20, 1930 – January 26, 1984) was an American politician. He served as a Democratic member for the 3rd district of the Florida House of Representatives.

== Life and career ==
Hagler was born in Pensacola, Florida.

In 1974, Hagler was elected to represent the 3rd district of the Florida House of Representatives, succeeding Tom Tobiassen. He served until 1982, when he was succeeded by Grover Robinson III.

Hagler died on January 26, 1984, at the age of 53.
