= 2025 United States House of Representatives elections =

- April 1 – December 2, 2025

6 of the 435 seats in the United States House of Representatives 218 seats needed for a majority
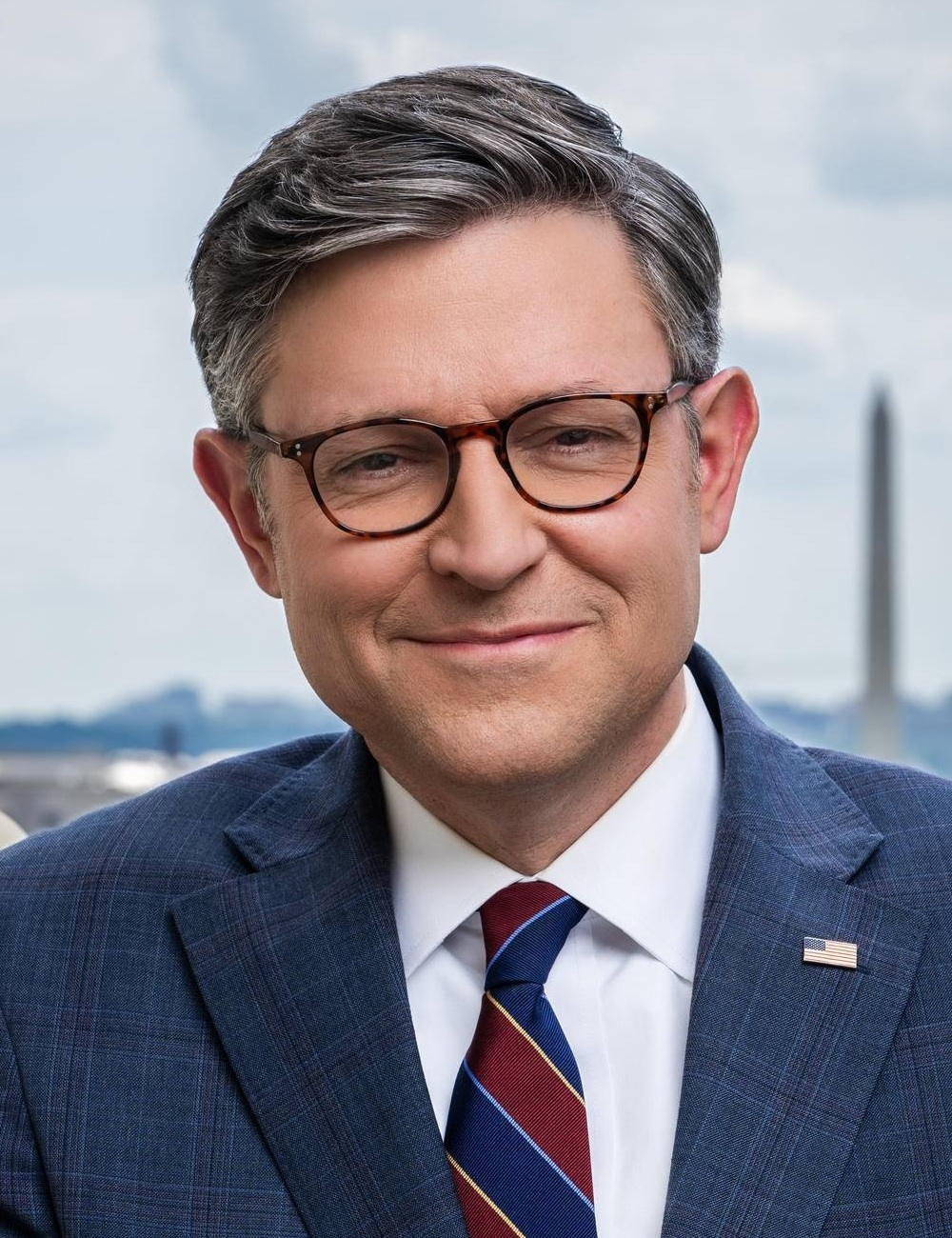

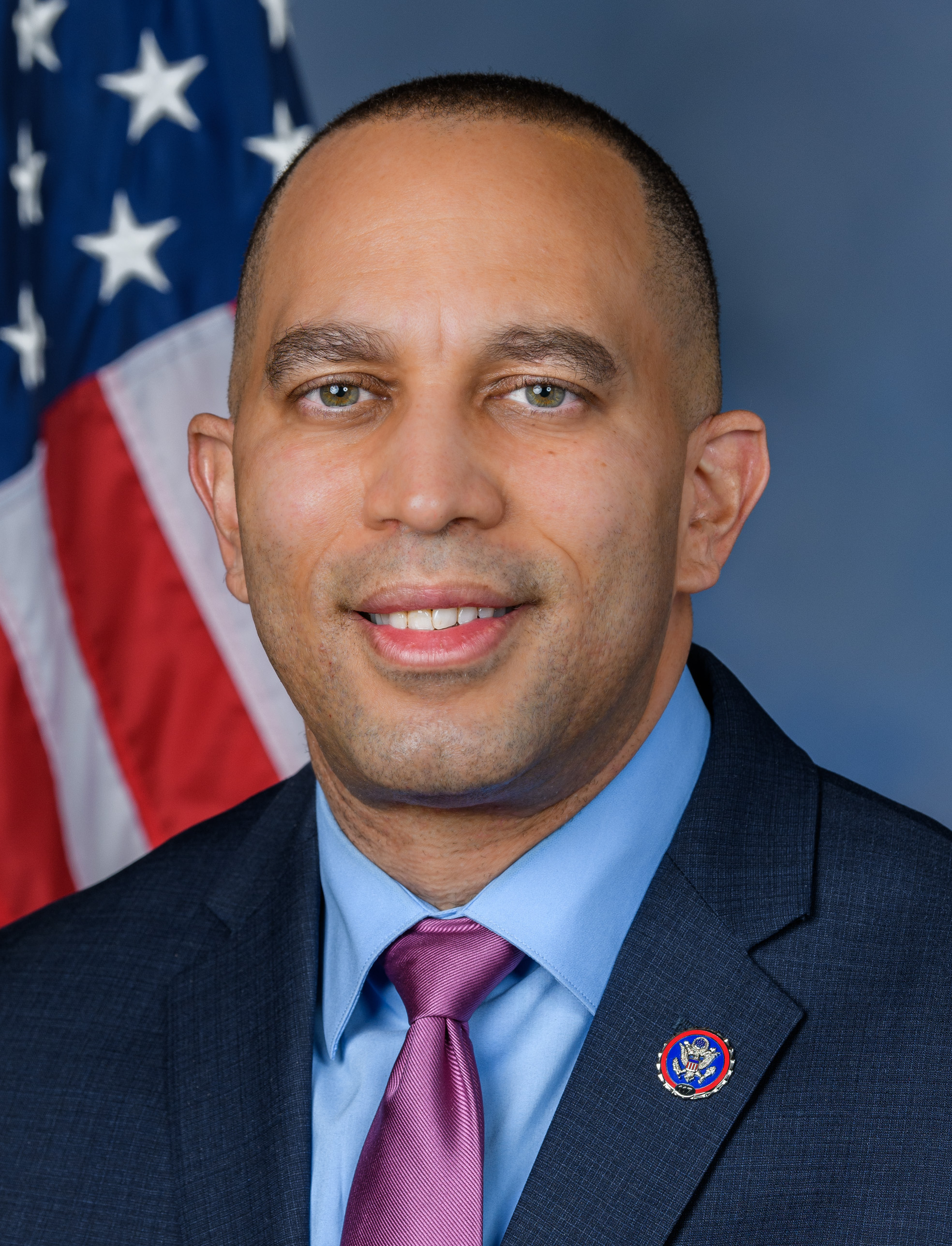
	Majority party	Minority party
Leader	Mike Johnson	Hakeem Jeffries
Party	Republican	Democratic
Leader since	October 25, 2023	January 3, 2023
Leader's seat	Louisiana 4th	New York 8th
Last election	220 seats, 50.5%	215 seats, 47.9%
Seats after	220	215
Popular vote	372,625	420,808 (Note: This excludes the result of the 2025–26 Texas's 18th congressional district special election, because the 1st round was a jungle primary.)
Percentage	46.58%	52.60%
Seats up	3	3
Seats won	3	3
- Democratic hold Republican hold No election

There were six special elections to the United States House of Representatives in 2025 during the 119th United States Congress.

== Summary ==
District	Incumbent			This race	
District	Member	Party	First elected	Results	Candidates
Florida 1	Matt Gaetz	Republican	2016	Incumbent won reelection, but resigned November 13, 2024 during the previous Congress, and declined to be seated for the current Congress. New member elected on April 1, 2025. Republican hold.	▌ ✓ Jimmy Patronis (Republican) 56.9%; ▌Gay Valimont (Democratic) 42.3%; ▌Stephen Broden (Independent) 0.8%
Florida 6	Mike Waltz	Republican	2018	Incumbent resigned January 20, 2025, to become National Security Advisor. New member elected on April 1, 2025. Republican hold.	▌ ✓ Randy Fine (Republican) 56.7%; ▌Josh Weil (Democratic) 42.7%; ▌Andrew Parrott (Libertarian) 0.4%; ▌Randall Terry (Independent) 0.3%
Virginia 11	Gerry Connolly	Democratic	2008	Incumbent died May 21, 2025. New member elected on September 9, 2025. Democratic hold.	▌ ✓ James Walkinshaw (Democratic) 75.1%; ▌Stewart Whitson (Republican) 24.7%
Arizona 7	Raúl Grijalva	Democratic	2002	Incumbent died March 13, 2025. New member elected on September 23, 2025. Democratic hold.	▌ ✓ Adelita Grijalva (Democratic) 68.9%; ▌Daniel Butierez (Republican) 29.4%; ▌Eduardo Quintana (Green) 1.1%; ▌Richard Grayson (No Labels) 0.5%
Tennessee 7	Mark Green	Republican	2018	Incumbent resigned on July 20, 2025. New member elected on December 2, 2025. Republican hold.	▌ ✓ Matt Van Epps (Republican) 53.9%; ▌Aftyn Behn (Democratic) 45.1%; ▌Jon Thorp (Independent) 0.5%; ▌Terri Christie (Independent) 0.3%; ▌Bobby Dodge (Independent) 0.1%; ▌Robert Sutherby (Independent) 0.1%
Texas 18	Sylvester Turner	Democratic	2024	Incumbent died March 5, 2025. New member elected on January 31, 2026, after no candidate received a majority vote in the November 4 jungle primary. Democratic hold.	First round: ▌ Christian Menefee (Democratic) 28.9%; ▌ Amanda Edwards (Democratic) 25.6%; ▌Jolanda Jones (Democratic) 19.1%; ▌Carmen María Montiel (Republican) 6.7%; ▌Isaiah Martin (Democratic) 5.7%; Runoff: ▌ ✓ Christian Menefee (Democratic) 68.9%; ▌Amanda Edwards (Democratic) 31.1%

== Florida's 1st congressional district ==
Florida's 1st congressional district

Republican Matt Gaetz resigned on November 13, 2024, shortly after President-elect Donald Trump announced that he would nominate Gaetz to serve as the United States attorney general, although Gaetz later withdrew from consideration for that position. Governor Ron DeSantis called the election for April 1, 2025, and primary elections were held on January 28. Republican state CFO Jimmy Patronis won the election.

2025 Florida's 1st congressional district special election
Party	Candidate	Votes	%
Republican	Jimmy Patronis	97,370	56.86%
Democratic	Gay Valimont	72,375	42.26%
Independent	Stephen Broden	1,384	0.81%
Write-in	Stanley Gray	88	0.05%
Write-in	Stan McDaniels	31	0.02%
Total votes		171,248	100.00%
Republican hold			

== Florida's 6th congressional district ==
Florida's 6th congressional district

Republican Mike Waltz resigned on January 20, 2025, to become Trump's National Security Advisor. Governor Ron DeSantis called the election for April 1, 2025, and primary elections were held on January 28. Republican state senator Randy Fine won the election.

2025 Florida's 6th congressional district special election
Party	Candidate	Votes	%
Republican	Randy Fine	110,980	56.68%
Democratic	Josh Weil	83,580	42.69%
Libertarian	Andrew Parrott	702	0.36%
Independent	Randall Terry	526	0.27%
Write-in	Chuck Sheridan	12	0.01%
Total votes		195,800	100.00%
Republican hold			

== Texas's 18th congressional district ==
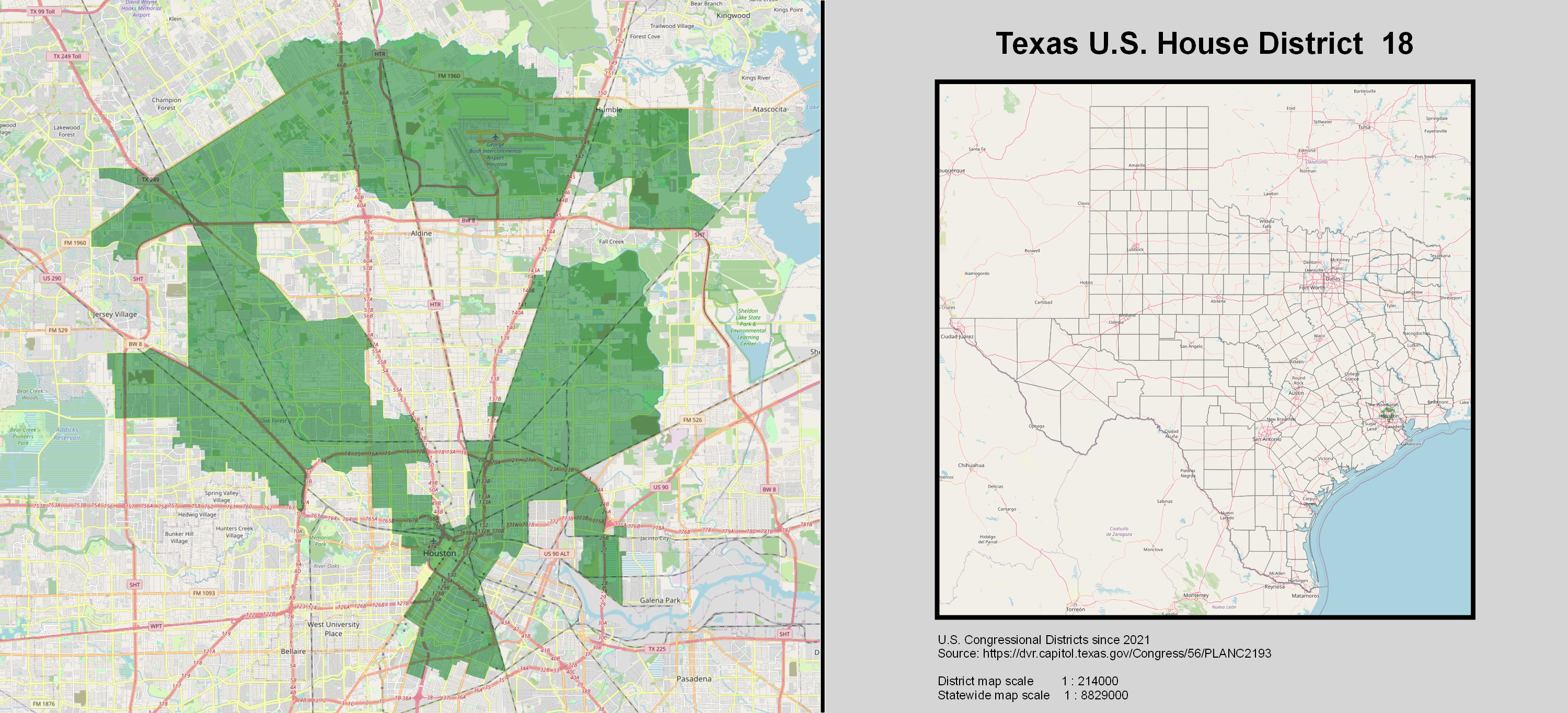
Texas's 18th congressional district

Incumbent Democrat Sylvester Turner died on March 5, 2025. Governor Greg Abbott called the special election for November 4, 2025. With no candidate receiving at least 50% of the vote, the top two candidates, county attorney Christian Menefee and former city councillor Amanda Edwards, advanced to the runoff election, which was scheduled to be held on January 31, 2026, where Menefee won.

2026 Texas's 18th congressional district special election runoff
Party	Candidate	Votes	%
Democratic	Christian Menefee	18,646	68.86%
Democratic	Amanda Edwards	8,434	31.14%
Total votes		27,080	100.00%
Democratic hold			

== Arizona's 7th congressional district ==
Arizona's 7th congressional district

Incumbent Democrat Raúl Grijalva died on March 13, 2025, from complications from cancer treatment. Governor Katie Hobbs called a special election to be held on September 23, 2025. Democratic former Pima County supervisor and Grijalva's daughter Adelita Grijalva won the election.

2025 Arizona's 7th congressional district special election
Party	Candidate	Votes	%
Democratic	Adelita Grijalva	70,148	68.92%
Republican	Daniel Butierez	29,944	29.42%
Green	Eduardo Quintana	1,118	1.10%
No Labels	Richard Grayson	537	0.53%
Write-in		29	0.03%
Total votes		101,776	100.00%
Democratic hold			

== Virginia's 11th congressional district ==
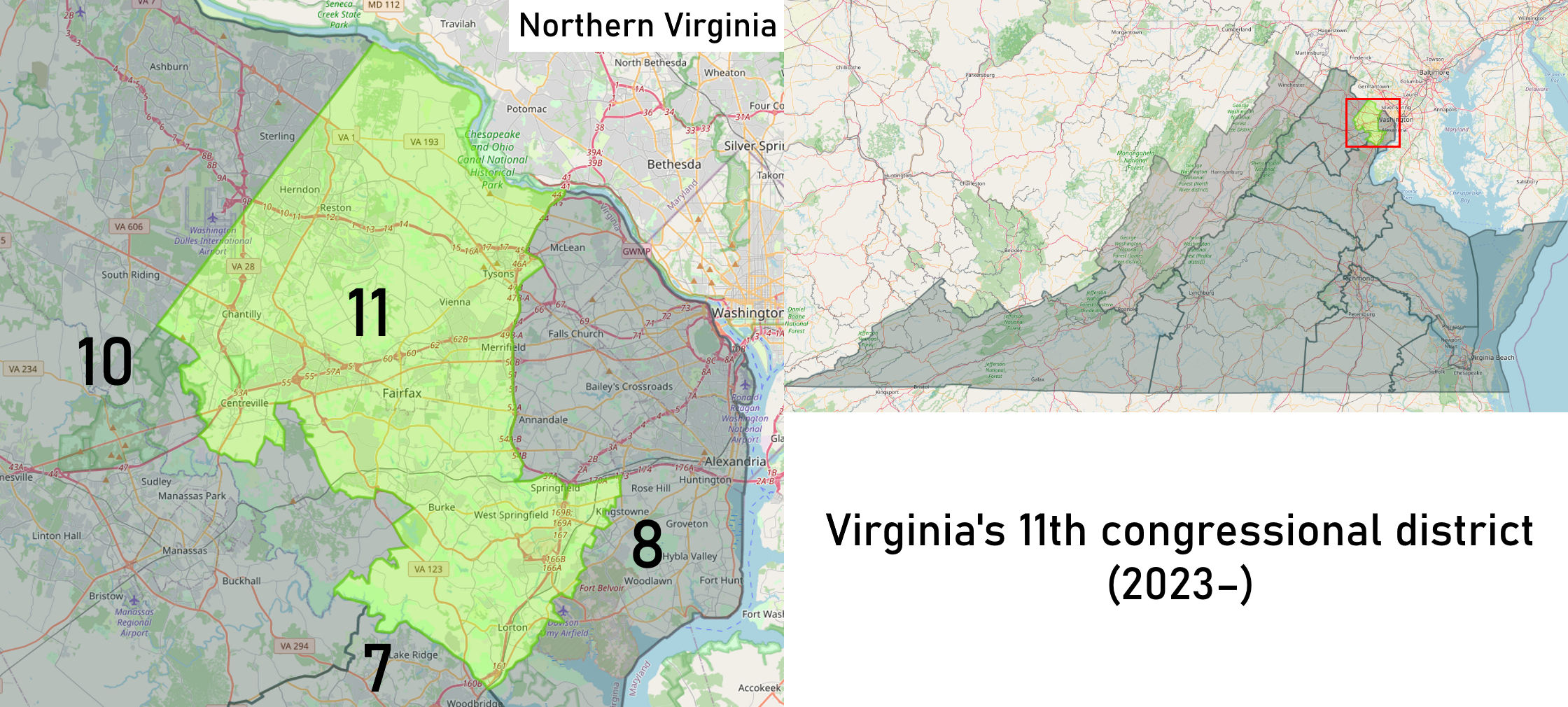
Virginia's 11th congressional district

Incumbent Democrat Gerry Connolly died on May 21, 2025, from complications related to esophageal cancer. Prior to his death, Connolly had announced his intention to not seek re-election in 2026 and had instead endorsed Democrat James Walkinshaw, his former chief of staff and current member of the Fairfax County Board of Supervisors. Governor Glenn Youngkin called a special election to be held on September 9, 2025. Walkinshaw won the election.

2025 Virginia's 11th congressional district special election
Party	Candidate	Votes	%
Democratic	James Walkinshaw	113,596	75.14%
Republican	Stewart Whitson	37,297	24.67%
Write-in		287	0.19%
Total votes		151,180	100.00%
Democratic hold			

== Tennessee's 7th congressional district ==
Tennessee's 7th congressional district

Incumbent Republican Mark Green resigned on July 20, 2025, following the passage of the One Big Beautiful Bill Act. Governor Bill Lee called the general election to take place on December 2, 2025. Republican former commissioner of the Tennessee Department of General Services Matt Van Epps won the election.

2025 Tennessee's 7th congressional district special election
Party	Candidate	Votes	%
Republican	Matt Van Epps	97,034	53.90%
Democratic	Aftyn Behn	81,109	45.06%
Independent	Jon Thorp	932	0.52%
Independent	Terri Christie	610	0.34%
Independent	Bobby Dodge	198	0.11%
Independent	Robert Sutherby	129	0.07%
Total votes		180,012	100.00%
Republican hold			

== New York's 21st congressional district (reversed) ==
New York's 21st congressional district

Incumbent Republican Elise Stefanik was expected to resign to take office as the U.S. ambassador to the United Nations, after being nominated to the position by President-elect Donald Trump on November 11, 2024. Governor Kathy Hochul would have been responsible for calling a special election ten days after the vacancy, to take place between 70 and 80 days afterwards. However, after several months of delays, Stefanik's nomination was withdrawn by President Trump on March 27, 2025, due to concerns over the slim Republican Party majority in the House of Representatives. Stefanik had been expected to be confirmed; her nomination was reported favorably out of the Senate Foreign Relations Committee, and House Majority Leader Steve Scalise was planning to host a going-away party for Stefanik on March 31.

In lieu of a primary election, nominees for the special election would have been chosen by party chairpersons from each county in the 21st district. A wide field of Republicans had declared their intent to seek the nomination, including Joe Pinion, Dan Stec, and Chris Tague. The New York State Conservative Party endorsed Stec. Democrats nominated dairy farmer Blake Gendebien for the expected special election on February 4. Richard Grayson, writer and perennial candidate, filed as a write-in candidate proposing that the 21st District become a province of Canada, satirizing Trump's push for the United States to annex Canada.
