= Mike Hill (American politician) =

American politician (born 1958)

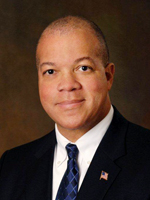

Member of the Florida House of Representatives
- In office November 6, 2018 – November 3, 2020
- Preceded by: Clay Ingram
- Succeeded by: Michelle Salzman
- Constituency: 1st district
- In office June 11, 2013 – November 8, 2016
- Preceded by: Clay Ford
- Succeeded by: Frank White
- Constituency: 2nd district

Personal details
- Born: Walter Bryan Hill; June 2, 1958 (age 68) Scott Air Force Base, Illinois, U.S.
- Party: Republican
- Spouse: Greta Hill
- Children: 3
- Education: United States Air Force Academy (BS); University of West Florida (MBA)

Military service
- Allegiance: United States
- Branch/service: United States Air Force
- Years of service: 1980–1990
- Awards: Air Force Achievement Medal; Air Force Commendation Medal; Air Force Organizational Excellence Award

Walter Bryan "Mike" Hill (born June 2, 1958) is a Republican politician from Florida. He served in the Florida House of Representatives from 2013 to 2016 and 2018 to 2020, representing the Pensacola area.

== Florida House of Representatives ==
Following the death of Republican state representative Clay Ford, who had represented the 2nd District since 2007, on March 18, 2013, Hill ran in the special election and defeated Scott Miller, Ed Gray, Mark Taylor, Jack Nobles and David Radcliffe in the Republican primary with 42 percent of the vote. He was endorsed in his primary campaign by the Pensacola News Journal, which declared that his "military experience, passion for open government, and business experience" made him the best candidate. In the general election, he faced Jeremy Lau, the Democratic nominee and a labor union official. Lau received the support of Ed Gray, whom Hill had defeated in the primary, and attacked Hill for not living in the district. However, owing to the district's strong partisan lean, Hill defeated Lau comfortably, having won 58 percent of the vote, which enabled him to become the legislature's only African-American Republican member.

In his campaign for re-election in 2014, Hill faced Lau once again. Hill campaigned for re-election with the full support of the Republican Party of Florida, which declared, "Mike Hill knows what his constituents want. They want someone who will fight for increased spending in education, for reduced taxes, and regulations and that is what Mike Hill represents." He ended up defeating Lau in a landslide once again, winning 65% of the vote to Lau's 35%.

Hill did not seek re-election to the House in 2016, instead facing Doug Broxson in the Republican primary for the District 1 seat in the Florida Senate. Hill was defeated, winning 43.5% of the vote to Broxson's 56.5%. During the election, Hill faced scrutiny over his residency qualifications to serve in the Florida House. Hill was investigated by the Escambia County Property Appraiser's office for alleged homestead fraud. Hill explained his residency by saying that his wife and children lived permanently at a house in Marcus Pointe, and he lived apart from them at a rented condominium on Pensacola Beach.

In 2018, Hill successfully sought election to the Florida House once again, this time representing House District 1. Hill defeated Rebekah Bydlak and Lisa Doss in the Republican primary before defeating Democrat Vikki Garrett in the general election. In the 2020 election, Hill was defeated in the Republican primary by Michelle Salzman.

In the 2022 election, Hill again sought election to the House. He was defeated in the Republican primary by Salzman.

== Controversies ==
After taking office in 2018, Hill faced controversy when at a public forum, he laughed in response to a question from an audience member who claimed that New Testament penalties for homosexuality included the death penalty. After saying, "the Old Testament says that too," Hill said "imagine how that would go over" if he introduced such legislation.

Hill initially refused to apologize, claiming he was a victim of a "social media lynching." He later issued an apology, citing how the "tone of his response was received," after public outcry, including from House Speaker Jose Oliva and Rules Committee Chairman Chris Sprowls. Hill was also condemned publicly by openly gay fellow state representative Carlos Smith, who called for him to "apologize" or "resign." Pensacola News Journal columnist Andy Marlette called Hill "unfit for office." He was later removed from the House Public Integrity and Ethics Committee for his comments.

In April 2020, Hill received "significant backlash" for telling a woman who had recently lost her job due to coronavirus that she "shouldn't ask for government permission" to go back to work when the woman asked Hill for assistance with applying for unemployment insurance. Hill's response was called "callous" in local media. Hill had previously been criticized for appearing to make light of the coronavirus crisis by dining in close quarters.

Hill again made news in 2020 when his campaign manager, Barbara Mayall, was booked into the Escambia County jail and charged with driving under the influence of alcohol.

In August 2020, Hill, who was running for re-election for District 1 of the Florida House, lost in the Republican primary to Michelle Salzman with 47.5% of the vote to Salzman's 52.5%.

Hill has made many controversial statements on Twitter and in public. In 2019, it was reported by Newsweek that Hill told an audience that God told him to introduce an abortion bill with no exceptions. Hill was quoted in the Pensacola News Journal telling listeners that "As plain as day, God spoke to me … He said that wasn't my bill, talking about the heartbeat detection bill that I filed. He said that wasn't my bill. I knew immediately what he was talking about. He said, you remove those exceptions and you file it again. And I said yes Lord, I will."

In 2018, he referred to Islam as a "cancer" and a "demonic Muslim horde." Hill also falsely claimed on Twitter in 2018 to have earned the endorsement of President Trump, citing a reference to Michael Jordan. Questions were raised whether this violated Florida campaign law, though formal charges were not filed. In that same campaign, Hill falsely claimed to have brought Trump's star from the Hollywood Walk of Fame to Pensacola.

When he failed in his attempt to pass legislation to rename the Pensacola Bay Bridge after General Chappie James, Hill publicly accused a colleague of being a "thief in the night." The proposal was ultimately signed into law in 2020.
