= Clay Ford =

American politician (1938–2013)

Clarence V. "Clay" Ford
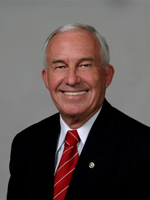

Member of the Florida House of Representatives
- In office February 27, 2007 – March 18, 2013
- Preceded by: Holly Benson
- Succeeded by: Mike Hill
- Constituency: 3rd district (2007–2012); 2nd district (2012–2013)

Member of the Gulf Breeze City Council
- In office 1990 – March 2007

Member of the Arkansas House of Representatives from the Pulaski County district
- In office 1975–1976

Personal details
- Born: September 24, 1938 Wynne, Cross County; Arkansas, USA
- Died: March 18, 2013 (aged 74)
- Cause of death: Cancer
- Party: Arkansas Democrat-turned-Florida Republican
- Spouse: Carol Ann Ford
- Children: David Anthony Ford Douglas A. Ford; Clay V. Ford Nine grandchildren
- Education: University of Arkansas University of Arkansas School of Law; Shippensburg University of Pennsylvania United States Army War College
- Occupation: Attorney and retired military officer

Military service
- Branch/service: United States Army United States Army Reserve Arkansas National Guard

Clarence V. Ford, known as Clay Ford (September 24, 1938 – March 18, 2013), was an attorney and Republican politician from Gulf Breeze in Santa Rosa County near Pensacola, Florida, who, from 2007 until his death, represented District 2 in the Florida House of Representatives.

== Early life and education ==
A native of Wynne in Cross County in eastern Arkansas, Ford was married to Carol Ann Ford and had three children, David, Doug, and Clay, and seven grandchildren. He served in the infantry in the United States Army, the Army Reserve, and the Arkansas National Guard from 1955 to 1988, having advanced through the ranks from private to colonel. He studied at the United States Army War College in Carlisle Barracks in Pennsylvania and the United States Air Force War College in Frankfurt, Germany.

In 1969, he received a Bachelor of Arts in Finance from the University of Arkansas at Fayetteville. In 1978, he obtained a Juris Doctor from the University of Arkansas School of Law, also in Fayetteville. In 1986, Ford obtained a Master of Science degree in public administration from Shippensburg University of Pennsylvania in Shippensburg, Pennsylvania.

== Career ==
He was a member of the Arkansas House of Representatives from 1975 to 1976. From 1977 to 1979, he was a member of the Special School District Board in Pulaski County in Little Rock, Arkansas. He was a delegate to the Arkansas Constitutional Convention held in Little Rock in 1978 and 1979.

After moving to Florida, he served on the Gulf Breeze City Council from 1990 to 2007 and was president of the Florida League of Cities from 2004 to 2005. On February 27, 2007, he was elected to the Florida House to succeed Holly Benson, who had been appointed to head the Department of Business and Professional Regulation by then Governor Charlie Crist. Ford was re-elected to the Florida House in November 2008. From 2008 to 2009, he was the House Deputy Whip.

He was a Methodist and a member of the American Legion, the Arkansas Bar Association, and the Florida Bar. He was affiliated with the Gulf Breeze Chamber of Commerce and Rotary International. He was a lifetime member of the National Rifle Association. He received endorsements from the NRA as well as the Florida Chamber of Commerce and Florida Right to Life.

== Death and legacy ==
Ford died of cancer in Florida at the age of seventy-four. Will Weatherford, the Speaker of the Florida House of Representatives, said of his death: "The consummate gentleman of the House, Clay Ford was a friend, a mentor, and a tender conscience to all those who served with him. Last night, Clay lost his brave fight with cancer. Our thoughts and prayers go out to his wife Carol, his three sons, David, Doug, and Clay, and his nine grandchildren."

The Florida Legislature recognized Representative Clay Ford by naming the Minority Scholarship for accounting students the Clay Ford Scholarship Program in the 2013 legislative session.

Preceded by Holly Benson	Florida State Representative from District 2 (Escambia and Santa Rosa counties); 2007–2013	Succeeded by Mike Hill
