= Jayer Williamson =

American politician

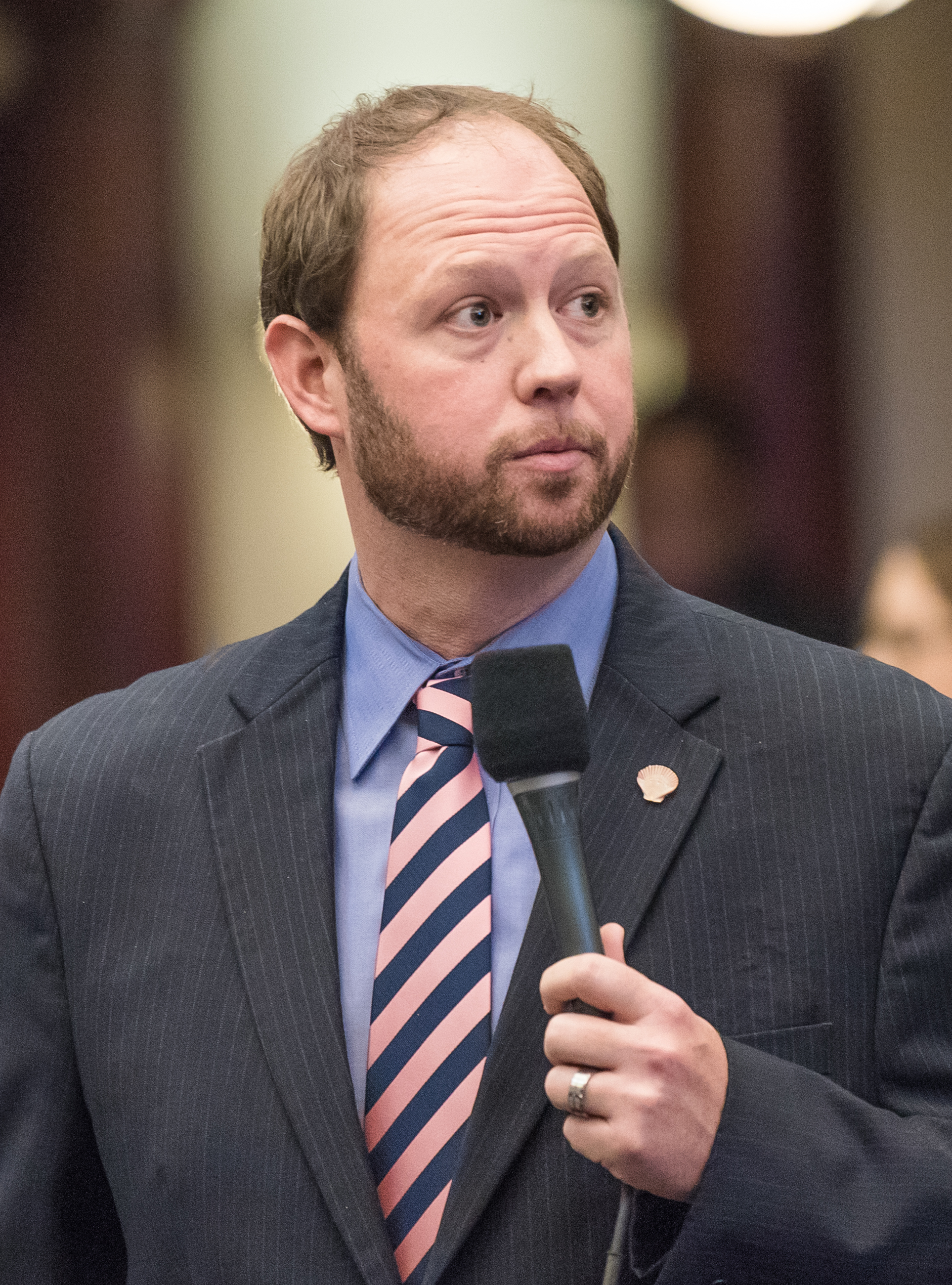

Member of the Florida House of Representatives from the 3rd district
- In office November 8, 2016 – November 8, 2022
- Preceded by: Doug Broxson
- Succeeded by: Joel Rudman

Member of the Santa Rosa County Commission from the 1st district
- In office June 18, 2014 – November 11, 2014
- Preceded by: Jim Williamson
- Succeeded by: Sam Parker

Personal details
- Born: January 19, 1979 (age 47) Pensacola, Florida, U.S.
- Party: Republican
- Spouse: Linsey Williamson
- Children: 2
- Education: University of West Florida (BA)

Jayer Williamson (born January 19, 1979) is a politician from the state of Florida. He held the position of state representative from the Florida State House's third district from 2016 to 2022. He previously held the position of District One Santa Rosa County Commissioner. He was appointed to this position by Governor Rick Scott, after the death of then commissioner, Jim Williamson. He held the seat until the next general election for the position.

== Personal life ==
Jayer Williamson was born in Pensacola, Florida, and he currently resides in the city of Pace, Florida. According to the official website of the Florida Legislature, Williamson is the founder and a member of the Santa Rosa Young Professionals club, a member of Santa Rosa Kid's House, and the president of the Navy League of Santa Rosa County.

Williamson is married to Linsey Williamson, and has two children, named Brooks and Rylin.
