= Jerry Burroughs =

American politician

Member of the Florida House of Representatives from the 1st district
- In office November 8, 1994 – November 3, 1998
- Preceded by: Bolley Johnson
- Succeeded by: Jeff Miller

Personal details
- Born: October 2, 1967 (age 58)
- Party: Republican

Jerrold "Jerry" Burroughs (born October 2, 1967) is an American former politician. He was a Republican representative in the Florida House of Representatives from 1994 to 1998. He represented the 1st district.
