= DeeDee Ritchie =

American politician (born 1953)

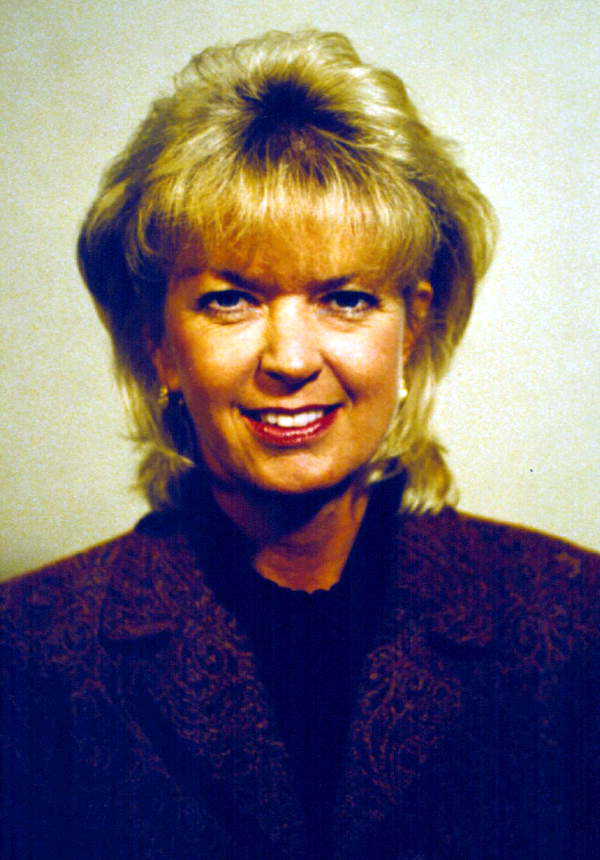
- Ritchie in 1998

Member of the Florida House of Representatives from the 3rd district
- In office November 3, 1998 – November 7, 2000
- Preceded by: Buzz Ritchie
- Succeeded by: Holly Benson

Personal details
- Born: September 22, 1953 (age 73) Leesville, Louisiana, U.S.
- Party: Democratic
- Spouse: Buzz Ritchie
- Education: Auburn University; University of Nevada, Las Vegas

DeeDee Ritchie (born September 22, 1953) is an American politician from Pensacola, Florida.

== Personal life ==
Ritchie was born on September 22, 1953, in Leesville, Louisiana. In 1975 she graduated from Auburn University, and in 1979 she graduated from the University of Nevada, Las Vegas with a masters in education. During her time in college she was a member of the Alpha Omicron Pi sorority. She has a career in education and won Florida Teacher of the year award in 1990, and was inducted into the Florida Teaching hall of fame in 1998. DeeDee was married to congressman Buzz Ritchie for 5 years, but they were separated and on the way to divorce when DeeDee ran for office.

== Political career ==
Ritchie's political career started in 1998 when she ran to fill the seat left by her estranged husband Buzz Ritchie retiring. She ran in the primary with an endorsement from her ex-husband, and would beat John Wyche. In the general election she would beat Paul Young by almost 10%.

In 2000 she would run for the 1st district of the Florida Senate. During the election she was called out by her opponent Durell Peaden for running negative and misleading advertising. In the general election Ritchie ended up losing to Peaden by over 15%.

== Electoral history ==
General election for Florida Senate District 1, 2000
Party	Candidate	Votes	%
Republican	Durell Peaden	83,982	58.0%
Democratic	DeeDee Ritche	60,734	42.0%

General Election for Florida House of Representatives District 3, 1998
Party	Candidate	Votes	%
Democratic	DeeDee Ritche	13,590	54.1%
Republican	Paul Young	11,527	45.9%

Democratic Primary for Florida House of Representatives District 3, 1998
Party	Candidate	Votes	%
Democratic	DeeDee Ritche	3,854	52.9%
Democratic	John Wyche	2,351	47.1%
