= James J. Reeves =

American politician

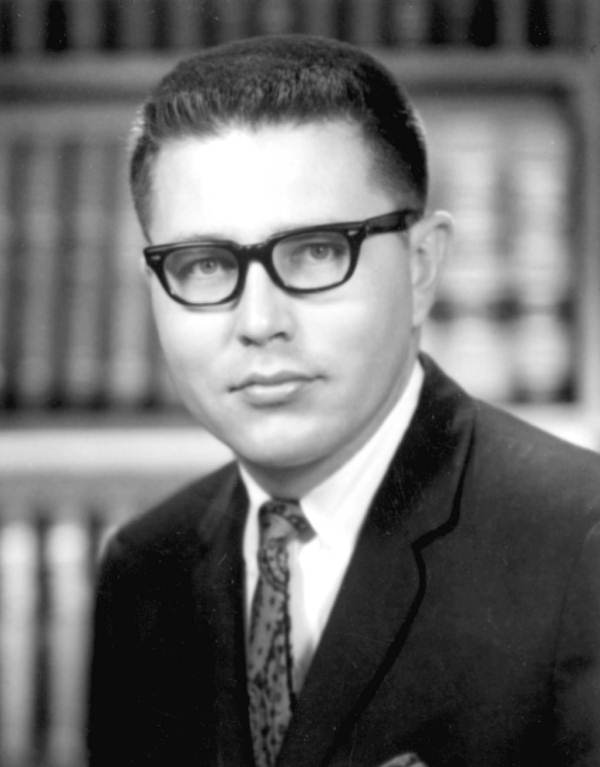

Member of the Florida House of Representatives from the 4th district
- In office 1967 – November 7, 1972
- Preceded by: district established
- Succeeded by: Ed Fortune

Member of the Florida House of Representatives from the Escambia district
- In office 1966–1967

Personal details
- Born: October 11, 1938 (age 87) Troy, Alabama, U.S.
- Party: Democratic
- Children: D. C. Reeves
- Education: Florida State University, Stetson University College of Law
- Occupation: attorney

James Jerauld Reeves (born October 11, 1938) is a politician in the American state of Florida. He served in the Florida House of Representatives from 1966 to November 7, 1972, representing the 4th district.
