= Nathan Boyles =

American politician

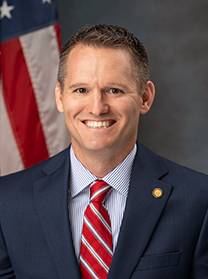

Member of the Florida House of Representatives from the 3rd district
- Incumbent
- Assumed office June 10, 2025
- Preceded by: Joel Rudman

Personal details
- Party: Republican
- Education: Northwest Florida State College (AA); Florida State University (BS, JD)
- Website: www.votenathanboyles.com

Nathan Boyles is an American politician. He serves as a Republican member for the 3rd district in the Florida House of Representatives since a 2025 special election.

Boyles grew up in North Okaloosa County and received a Bachelor's Degree in Civil Engineering with an emphasis in environmental engineering from Florida State University. He also earned his Juris Doctor from Florida State University and initially returned to Crestview to practice law. He also has owned and operated Adams Sanitation, a local trash company, since 2019.
