= Gordon W. Wells =

American politician

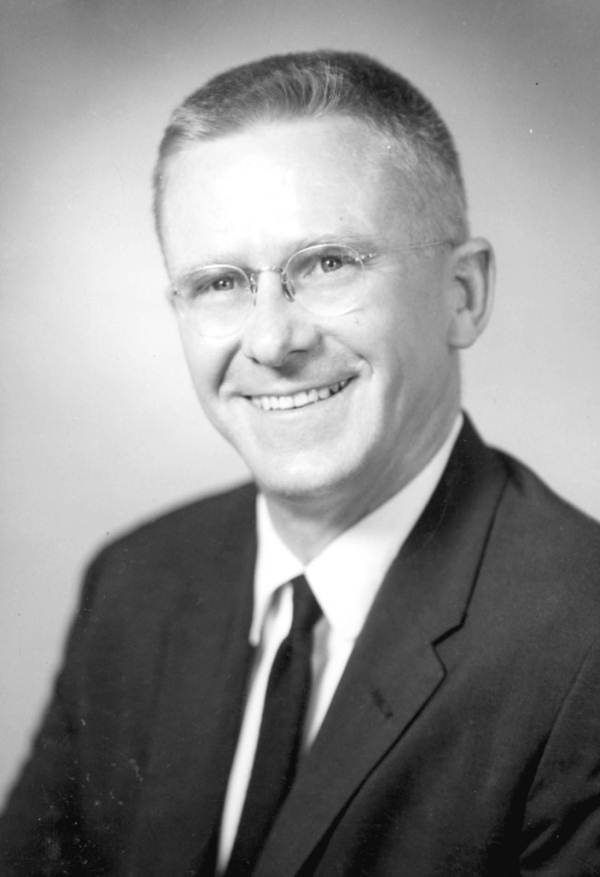
- Wells in 1962

Member of the Florida House of Representatives from Escambia County
- In office 1962–1967

Member of the Florida House of Representatives from the 1st district
- In office 1967–1968
- Preceded by: District established
- Succeeded by: Roy Hess

Personal details
- Born: December 6, 1917 Savannah, Georgia, U.S.
- Died: November 28, 1999 (aged 81)
- Party: Democratic
- Spouse: Linda C. Wells
- Education: University of Florida; Bowling Green College of Commerce; University of Miami

Gordon W. Wells (December 6, 1917 – November 28, 1999) was an American politician. He served as a Democratic member for the 1st district of the Florida House of Representatives.

== Life and career ==
Wells was born in Savannah, Georgia. He attended Milton High School, the University of Florida, Bowling Green College of Commerce and the University of Miami.

In 1962, Wells was elected to the Florida House of Representatives. In 1967, he was elected as the first representative for the newly-established 1st district. He served until 1968, when he was succeeded by Roy Hess.

Wells died in November 1999, at the age of 81.
