= Tom Tobiassen =

American politician (1931–2010)

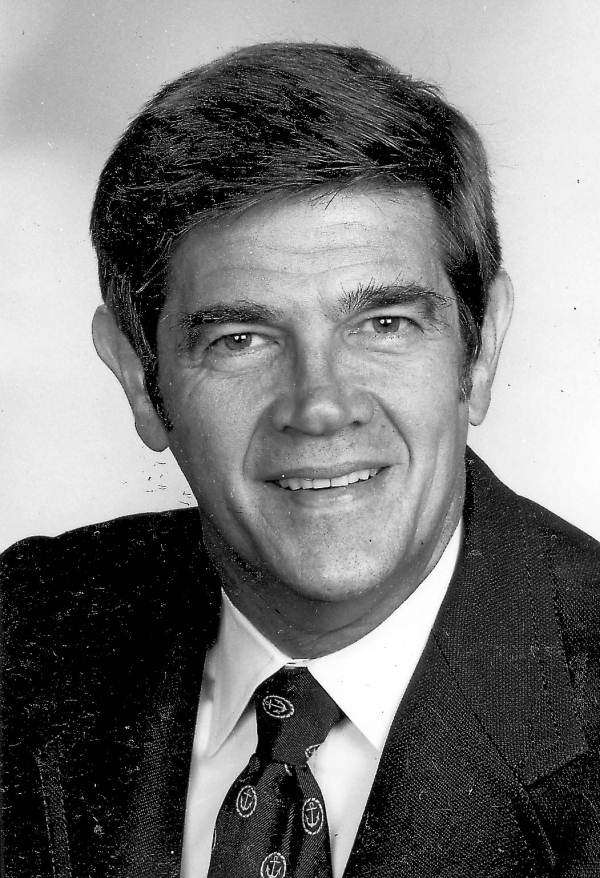
- Tobiassen in 1982

Member of the Florida Senate from the 2nd district
- In office November 5, 1974 – November 2, 1982
- Preceded by: James Johnston
- Succeeded by: Pat Thomas (redistricting)

Member of the Florida House of Representatives
- In office November 2, 1982 – November 3, 1992
- Preceded by: Grover Robinson III
- Succeeded by: Bolley Johnson
- Constituency: 1st district
- In office November 5, 1968 – November 5, 1974
- Preceded by: Phil Ashler
- Succeeded by: Clyde Hagler
- Constituency: 3rd district

Personal details
- Born: November 21, 1931 Omaha, Nebraska, U.S.
- Died: April 8, 2010 (aged 78)
- Party: Democratic (before 1982); Republican (1982–2010)
- Education: Ohio State University

Tom Tobiassen (November 21, 1931 – April 8, 2010) was an American politician. He served as a member for the 1st and 3rd district of the Florida House of Representatives. He also served as a member for the 2nd district of the Florida Senate.

== Life and career ==
Tobiassen was born in Omaha, Nebraska. He attended Ohio State University.

In 1968, Tobiassen was elected to represent the 3rd district of the Florida House of Representatives, serving until 1974. In the same year, he was elected to represent the 2nd district of the Florida Senate, serving until 1982, when he was elected to represent the 1st district of the Florida House, serving until 1992.

Tobiassen died on April 8, 2010, at the age of 78.
