= Roy Hess =

American politician

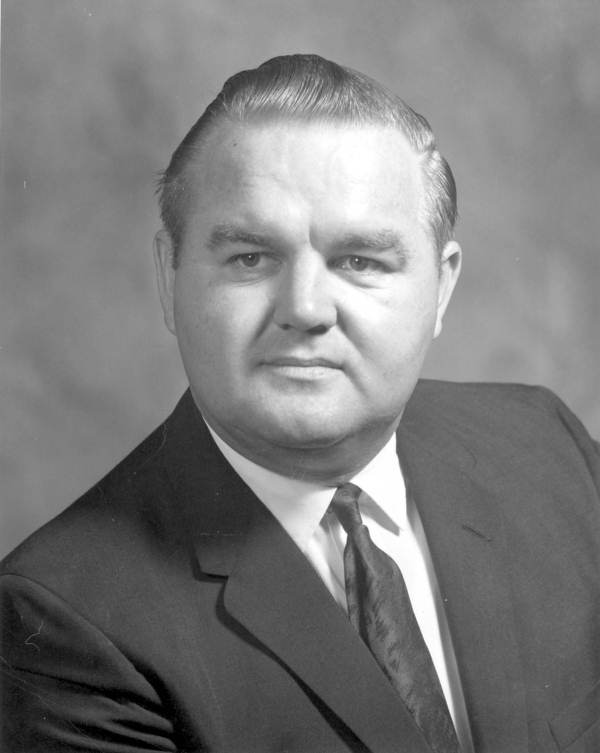
- Hess in 1969

Member of the Florida House of Representatives from the 1st district
- In office 1968–1972
- Preceded by: Gordon W. Wells
- Succeeded by: Grover Robinson III

Personal details
- Born: June 9, 1931 Waynesboro, Pennsylvania, U.S.
- Died: July 26, 2002 (aged 71)
- Party: Democratic

Roy L. Hess (June 9, 1931 – July 26, 2002) was an American politician. He served as a Democratic member for the 1st district of the Florida House of Representatives.

== Life and career ==
Hess was born in Waynesboro, Pennsylvania and was educated at Hagerstown Junior College, Maryland and then Penn State College.

He owned the Hess Marine, Inc and was a lieutenant in the Navy until discharged in 1958.

In 1968, Hess was elected to represent the 1st district of the Florida House of Representatives, succeeding Gordon W. Wells. He served until 1972, when he was succeeded by Grover Robinson III. During his first session Hess was a member of the conservation and transportation committees and supported the conservation of natural resources and environmental control.

Hess died in July 2002, at the age of 71 when the plane he was flying solo crashed.
