= 2025 Florida's 6th congressional district special election =

U.S. House special election

- April 1, 2025

Florida's 6th congressional district
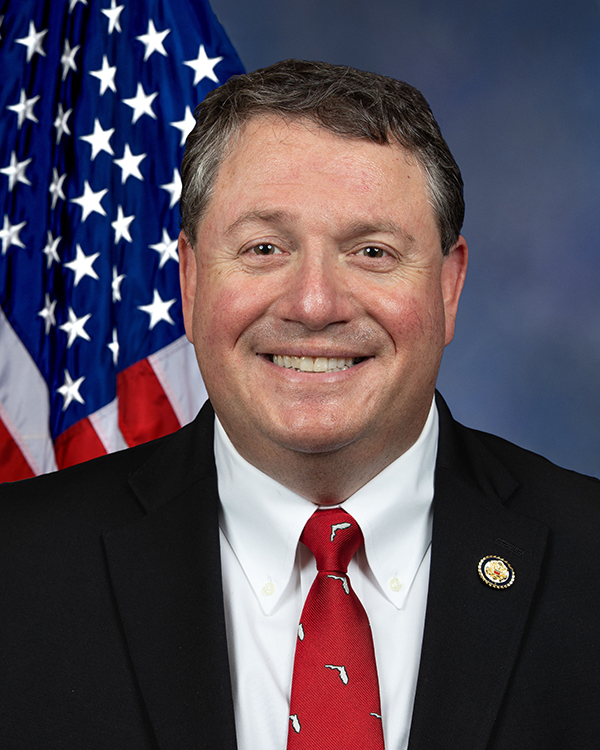

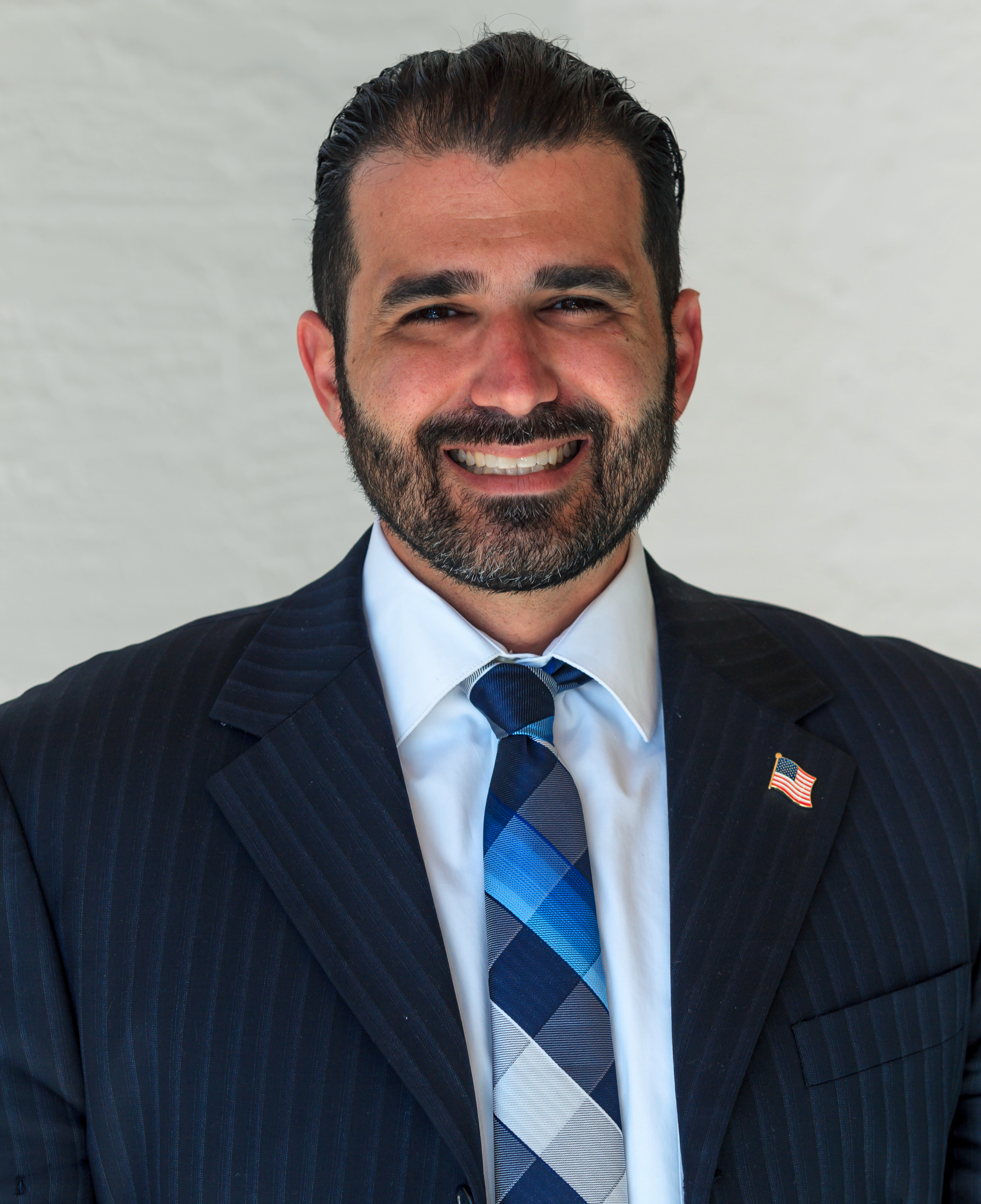
Nominee	Randy Fine	Josh Weil
Party	Republican	Democratic
Popular vote	110,980	83,580
Percentage	56.68%	42.69%
- Fine: 40–50% 50–60% 60–70% 70–80% 80–90% 90%+ Weil: 40–50% 50–60% 60–70% 70–80% 80–90% 90%+ Tie: 40–50%
U.S. Representative before election
Mike Waltz
Republican
Elected U.S. Representative
Randy Fine
Republican

The 2025 Florida's 6th congressional district special election was held on April 1, 2025, to choose a new member of the U.S. House of Representatives. The seat became vacant following the resignation of Republican incumbent Mike Waltz, who in 2024 had been re-elected with 66.5% of the vote, but was chosen by President Donald Trump to be his White House national security advisor. The district is considered safely Republican.

Florida state senator Randy Fine won the Republican primary with 83% of the vote, defeating Aaron Baker and Ehsan Joarder. Josh Weil, a schoolteacher, won the Democratic primary with 61%, defeating Ges Selmont. In the general election campaign, Weil outraised Fine by $10 million to under $1 million.

In the April 1 general election, Fine defeated Weil by 14 percentage points though he won by significantly less margins than Trump and Waltz had in the 2024 elections. The election was held alongside a concurrent special election for Florida's 1st congressional district.

== Republican primary ==
=== Candidates ===
==== Nominee ====
- Randy Fine, former state senator from the 19th district (2024–2025)

==== Eliminated in primary ====
- Aaron Baker
- Ehsan Joarder, IT specialist and candidate for the 14th district in 2024

==== Withdrawn ====
- Ernest Audino, district director for incumbent Michael Waltz
- Joe Mullins, former Flagler County commissioner (endorsed Fine)
- Steve Rance, Air Force veteran (endorsed Fine)

==== Declined ====
- Tom Leek, state senator from the 7th district (2024–present)
- Anthony Sabatini, Lake County commissioner (2024–present), chair of the Lake County Republican Party (2022–2024), and candidate for the 7th district in 2022 and the 11th district in 2024
- Ted Yoho, former U.S. representative from Florida's 3rd congressional district (2013–2021)

=== Endorsements ===
Randy Fine

Executive branch officials

- Donald Trump, 45th and 47th president of the United States (2017–2021, 2025–present)
- Mike Waltz, U.S. national security advisor (2025), Ambassador to the United Nations (2025–present) and former U.S. representative from Florida's 6th congressional district (2019–2025)

U.S. senators

- Rick Scott, U.S. senator from Florida (2019–present)

U.S. representatives

- Tom Emmer, House Majority Whip (2023–present) from Minnesota's 6th congressional district (2015–present)
- Mike Johnson, Speaker of the United States House of Representatives (2023–present) from Louisiana's 4th congressional district (2017–present)
- Steve Scalise, House majority leader (2023–present) from Louisiana's 1st congressional district (2008–present)

Organizations

- AIPAC
- Republican Jewish Coalition
- Veterans for America First

=== Results ===
Republican primary results by county: Fine: 70–80%; 80–90%

Republican primary results
Party	Candidate	Votes	%
Republican	Randy Fine	33,901	83.02%
Republican	Aaron Baker	5,735	14.04%
Republican	Ehsan Joarder	1,201	2.94%
Total votes		40,837	100.00%

== Democratic primary ==
=== Candidates ===
==== Nominee ====
- Josh Weil, teacher and candidate for U.S. Senate in 2022

==== Eliminated in primary ====
- Ges Selmont, attorney and nominee for the 4th district in 2018

==== Withdrawn ====
- Purvi Bangdiwala, pharmacist

=== Results ===
Democratic primary results by county: Weil: 50–60%; 60–70%

Democratic primary results
Party	Candidate	Votes	%
Democratic	Josh Weil	9,721	60.74%
Democratic	George Selmont	6,283	39.26%
Total votes		16,004	100.00%

== Third parties and independents ==
=== Libertarian Party ===
==== Nominee ====
- Andrew Parrott, welder

=== Independents ===
==== Declared ====
- Randall Terry, author, perennial candidate, and Constitution Party nominee for president in 2024

=== Write-in candidates ===
==== Declared ====
- Chuck Sheridan, general contractor and Republican candidate for state senate in 2024

== General election ==
=== Endorsements ===
Randy Fine (R)

Organizations

- National Federation of Independent Business
- United States Chamber of Commerce
Josh Weil (D)

U.S. senators

- Bernie Sanders, U.S. senator from Vermont (2007–present) (Independent)

Party officials

- Nikki Fried, chair of the Florida Democratic Party (2023–present)
- Ken Martin, chair of the Democratic National Committee (2025–present)

Individuals

- Le'Andria Johnson, singer
- Killer Mike, rapper
- Patti LaBelle, singer

Organizations

- Orlando Sentinel

=== Polling ===
Poll source	Date(s) administered	Sample size (Note: Key: A – all adults RV – registered voters LV – likely voters V – unclear)	Margin of error	Randy Fine (R)	Josh Weil (D)	Other	Undecided
Fabrizio Ward (R) (Note: The poll was a GOP poll that had been conducted by Fabrizio Ward in late March.)	March 28, 2025	–	–	41%	44%	5%	10%
St. Pete Polls (Note: Poll sponsored by Florida Politics)	March 22–25, 2025	403 (LV)	± 4.9%	48%	44%	2% (Note: "Someone else" with 2%)	6%

=== Fundraising ===
Campaign finance reports as of March 12, 2025
Candidate	Raised	Spent	Cash on hand
Randy Fine (R)	$987,459	$894,765	$92,693
Josh Weil (D)	$9,491,734	$8,210,682	$1,281,051
Source: Federal Election Commission

=== Results ===
2025 Florida's 1st congressional district special election results
Party	Candidate	Votes	%
Republican	Randy Fine	110,980	56.68%
Democratic	Josh Weil	83,580	42.69%
Libertarian	Andrew Parrott	702	0.36%
Independent	Randall Terry	526	0.27%
Write-ins		12	0.01%
Total votes		195,800	100.00%
Republican hold			

==== By county ====
County	Randy Fine Republican		Josh Weil Democratic		Andrew Parrott Libertarian		Randall Terry Independent		Margin		Total votes cast
County	#	%	#	%	#	%	#	%	#	%	Total votes cast
Flagler	22,222	57.00%	16,534	42.41%	140	0.36%	91	0.23%	5,688	14.59%	38,988
Lake	16,315	58.16%	11,535	41.12%	110	0.39%	87	0.31%	4,780	17.04%	28,050
Marion	23,516	62.20%	14,114	37.33%	104	0.28%	71	0.19%	9,402	24.87%	37,810
Putnam	9,719	66.67%	4,770	32.72%	43	0.30%	45	0.31%	4,949	33.95%	14,577
St. Johns	7,318	55.07%	5,909	44.47%	33	0.25%	29	0.22%	1,409	10.60%	13,289
Volusia	31,890	50.55%	30,718	48.69%	272	0.43%	203	0.32%	1,172	1.86%	63,086
Totals	110,980	56.68%	83,580	42.69%	702	0.36%	526	0.27%	27,400	13.99%	195,800

== See also ==
- 2025 United States House of Representatives elections
- List of special elections to the United States House of Representatives

== Notes ==
Partisan clients
