= Florida's 2nd House of Representatives district =

American legislative district

Florida's 2nd State House of Representatives district
Representative
Alex Andrade; R–Pensacola
- Demographics: 69.8% White; 22.0% Black; 5.2% Hispanic; 2.8% Asian; 0.7% Native American; 0.2% Hawaiian/Pacific Islander; 1.3% Other
- Population (2010) • Voting age: 155,932; 122,970

Florida's 2nd House district elects one member of the Florida House of Representatives. The district is represented by Alex Andrade. This district is located in the Florida Panhandle and encompasses part of the Emerald Coast. The district covers the southern portion of Escambia County and a small part of Santa Rosa County. The district is anchored on Pensacola, its largest city, and contains part of its metropolitan area. As of the 2010 census, the district's population is 155,932.

This district contains Naval Air Station Pensacola and Pensacola International Airport. The district also contains Pensacola State College and Pensacola Christian College, both located in Pensacola.

There was a vacancy between March 13, 2013 and March 4, 2014 due to the death of incumbent Clay Ford. Mike Hill, the president of the Northwest Florida Tea Party, won a special election to fill the seat.

== Representatives from 1967 to the present ==
Representatives by party affiliation
Party	Representatives
Republican	8
Democratic	6

Representatives from Florida's 2nd district
#	Name	Term of service	Residence	Political party	Counties represented
1	Warren M. Briggs	1967–1968	Pensacola	Democratic	Escambia
2	Gordon Tyrrell	1968–1972	Pensacola	Democratic	Escambia
3	R. W. Peaden	1972–1976	Pensacola	Democratic	Escambia
4	Tom Patterson	1976–1982	Pensacola	Democratic	Escambia
5	Ginger Wetherell	1982–1988	Pensacola	Democratic	Escambia
6	Buzz Ritchie	1988–1992	Pensacola	Democratic	Escambia
7	Lois Benson	1992–1994	Pensacola	Republican	Escambia
8	Jerry Maygarden	1994–2002	Pensacola	Republican	Escambia
9	Dave Murzin	2002–2010	Pensacola	Republican	Escambia
10	Clay Ingram	2010–2012	Pensacola	Republican	Escambia
11	Clay Ford	2012–2013	Pensacola	Republican	Escambia, Santa Rosa
	Vacant				
12	Mike Hill	2013–2016	Pensacola	Republican	Escambia, Santa Rosa
13	Frank White	2016–2018	Pensacola	Republican	Escambia, Santa Rosa
14	Alex Andrade	2018–present	Pensacola	Republican	Escambia, Santa Rosa

== See also ==
- Florida's 1st Senate district
- Florida's 1st congressional district
