= D. C. Reeves =

American businessman, journalist and politician

D.C. Reeves
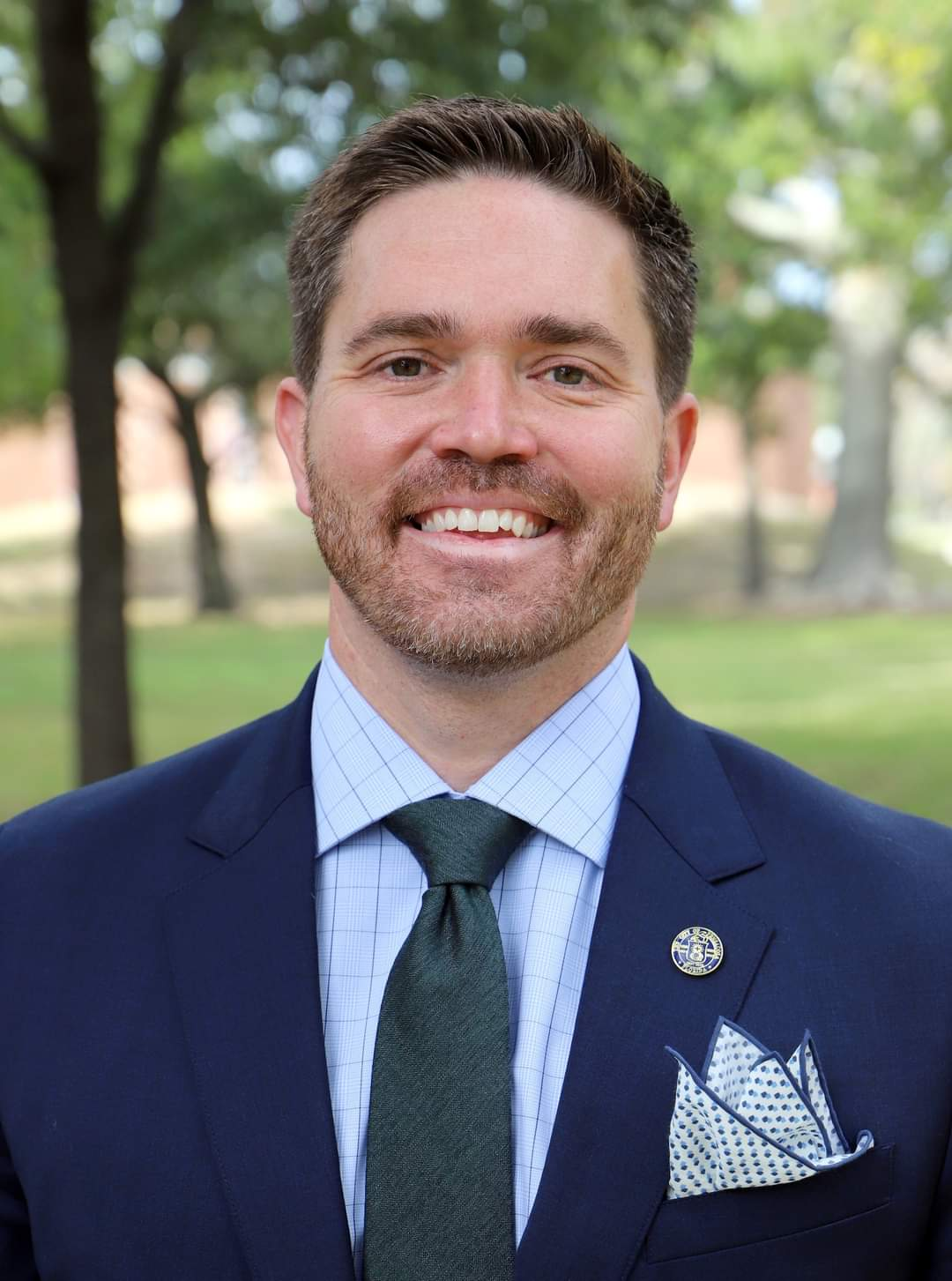
- Official portrait, 2022

64th Mayor of Pensacola
- Incumbent
- Assumed office November 22, 2022
- Preceded by: Grover Robinson IV

Personal details
- Born: Darcy Curran Reeves Pensacola, Florida, U.S.
- Party: Republican
- Parent: Jim Reeves (father)
- Website: Campaign website Government website

Darcy Curran Reeves is an American businessman, journalist, and politician who has served as the 64th mayor of Pensacola since 2022.

== Early life and career ==
Darcy Curran Reeves was born in Pensacola, Florida, to Connie Bookman and Jim Reeves, attorney and politician who served as a member of the Florida House of Representatives from the 4th district from 1966 to 1972 and on the Pensacola City Council from 1977 to 1983.

In 2019, he authored The Microbrewery Handbook, a how-to guide to understanding the business of opening a brewery, published by Wiley & Sons. In October 2022, Reeves sold Perfect Plain Brewery, along with the Well, Perennial, and Garden & Grain, three other businesses he founded with Odeneal, to Urban South Brewery, a New Orleans–based business.

In 2019, Reeves was the lead staff on the mayoral transition team for Mayor Grover Robinson IV, and was the chief entrepreneur officer at the Spring Entrepreneur Hub. From 2020 to 2021, Reeves served as chairman of the board for Visit Pensacola, the community's tourism marketing organization.

== Mayor of Pensacola ==
=== 2022 Pensacola mayoral election ===
On September 1, 2021, Reeves announced his candidacy for mayor of Pensacola in 2022. On August 23, 2022, in the primary election, Reeves earned the majority, 7,682 votes (51.11%), against three opponents, Jewell Cannada-Wynn, Sherri Myers and Steven Sharp. Because Reeves earned the majority in the primary, there was no runoff election on November 8.

=== Mayor of Pensacola ===
On November 22, 2022, Reeves was sworn in as the 64th mayor of Pensacola, succeeding Grover C. Robinson IV. At 38 years old, Reeves is the youngest mayor since J. Harvey Bayliss, appointed mayor in 1921, a span of 101 years.

== See also ==
- List of mayors of Pensacola, Florida
