= Grover Robinson III =

American politician (1943–2000)

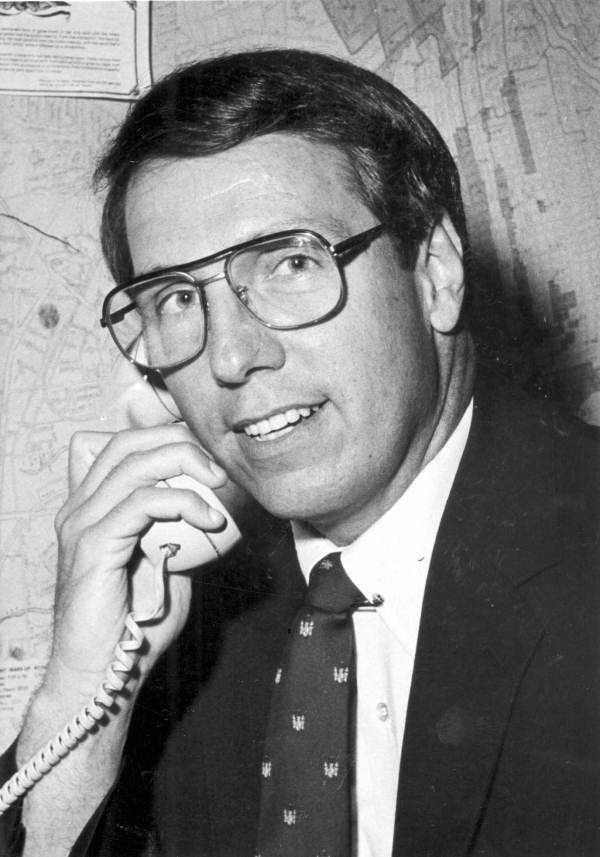
- Robinson in 1984

Member of the Florida House of Representatives from the 3rd district
- In office 1982–1986
- Preceded by: Clyde Hagler
- Succeeded by: Tom Banjanin

Member of the Florida House of Representatives from the 1st district
- In office 1972–1982
- Preceded by: Roy Hess
- Succeeded by: Tom Tobiassen

Personal details
- Born: May 6, 1943
- Died: March 28, 2000 (aged 56)
- Party: Democratic
- Children: 2, including Grover
- Awards: Bronze Star Medal

Military service
- Allegiance: United States
- Branch/service: United States Army
- Battles/wars: Vietnam War

Grover Cleveland Robinson III (May 6, 1943 – March 28, 2000) was an American politician and real estate developer. A member of the Democratic Party, he served as a member of the Florida House of Representatives from the 3rd district from 1982 to 1986, and as member from the 1st district from 1972 to 1982.

== Early life and education ==
Grover Cleveland Robinson III was born on May 6, 1943, to Grover Robinson Jr. and Fauntleroy Caldwell Robinson. He graduated from Pensacola High School in 1961. Robinson attended the University of Florida, graduating with an ROTC commission in 1966. He obtained a J.D. from the University of Florida Law School, graduating in 1970.

== Career ==
Following his ROTC commission, Robinson joined the United States Army, earning a Bronze Star Medal from fighting in the Vietnam War from 1966 to 1967. Robinson joined the Florida Bar, practicing law with his father, before running for Florida House of Representatives from the 1st district in 1972, where he served until 1982. In 1975, while still a member of the Florida Bar, Robinson left law practice to begin a career in real estate, founding the commercial real estate company Grover Robinson & Associates. In 1982, Robinson ran for Florida House of Representatives from the 3rd district, where he served until his resignation in 1986.

== Personal life ==
Near the end of his commission, Robinson married Sandra Lowrey. Together they had two children, Lowrey Elizabeth Robinson and Grover Robinson IV. In 1989, Robinson's 15-year-old daughter was killed in an automobile accident near Greenville, Alabama. On March 28, 2000, Robinson and his wife were killed in a helicopter crash while vacationing in New Zealand when their aircraft struck electrical wires.
