= Frank White (Florida politician) =

American politician

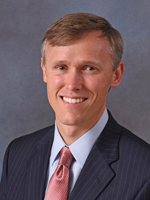

Member of the Florida House of Representatives from the 2nd district
- In office November 8, 2016 – November 6, 2018
- Preceded by: Mike Hill
- Succeeded by: Alex Andrade

Personal details
- Born: September 20, 1978 (age 47) Amarillo, Texas, U.S.
- Party: Republican
- Spouse: Stephanie Sansing
- Children: 4
- Education: Southern Methodist University (BA, BBA, JD, MBA)

Frank White (born September 20, 1978) is an American attorney and politician who served in the Florida House of Representatives from 2016 until 2018. He represented southern Escambia County, including the city of Pensacola.

== History ==
White was born in Amarillo, Texas, on September 20, 1978. White attended Southern Methodist University in Dallas, earning his bachelor's degree in history and business politics in 2001, and his master's degree in business and Juris Doctor in 2006. While there, White was also the student body president and the student representative to the board of trustees.

In 2007, White became an attorney at Akin Gump Strauss Hauer & Feld LLP, an American multinational law firm. He worked there until 2010, when he moved to Pensacola, Florida, in order to help run his in-laws' car dealership, Sandy Sansing Car Dealerships. White became the dealership's general counsel and chief financial officer, a position he still holds today. In 2016, he became the vice chair of the Pensacola State College board of trustees.

== Political career ==
In 2016, State Representative Mike Hill did not run for re-election, opting instead to run for state senator. White ran for Hill's seat, running unopposed in the Republican primary. White defeated the Democratic nominee, Ray Guillory, winning 61% of the vote to Guillory's 38%.

In 2018, White did not run for re-election, instead running for Florida Attorney General. He faced former Judge Ashley Moody in the bitterly contested Republican primary. Despite White bringing in over $3.4 million to his campaign and his constant attacks on Moody for being too liberal, she defeated White, 57% to 43%.

== Personal life ==
White is married to Stephanie White (née Sansing), a Pensacola native, and helps run her family's car dealership. They have four children together.

Florida House of Representatives
Preceded by Mike Hill	Member of the Florida House of Representatives from the 2nd district 2016–2018	Succeeded by Alex Andrade
