= Buzz Ritchie =

American politician (born 1947)

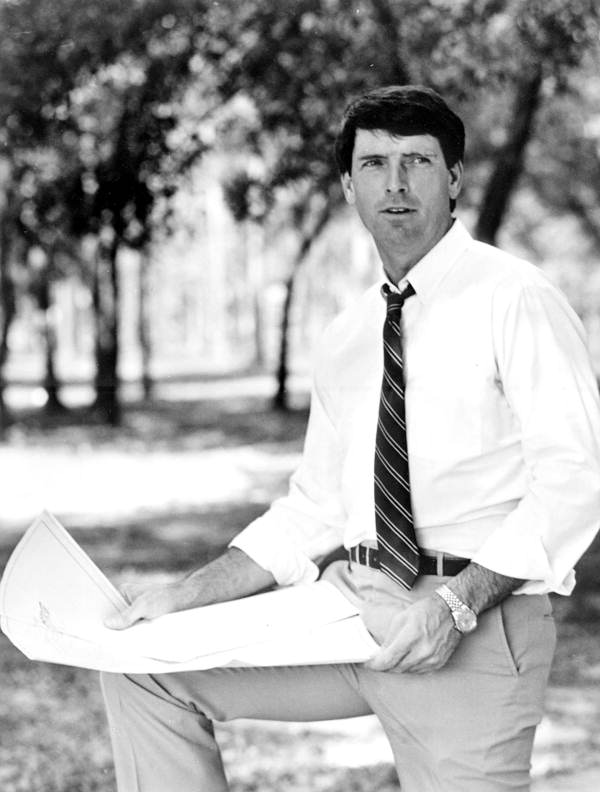

Member of the Florida House of Representatives
- In office November 8, 1988 – November 3, 1998
- Preceded by: Ginger Wetherell
- Succeeded by: DeeDee Ritchie
- Constituency: 2nd district (1988–1992); 3rd district (1992–1998)

Personal details
- Born: June 7, 1947 (age 79) Bay Shore, New York, U.S.
- Party: Democratic
- Education: University of Florida (BSBA, JD)
- Profession: Banker

Walter Jaycox "Buzz" Ritchie, Jr. (born June 7, 1947, in Bay Shore, New York) is an American banker and politician. He previously served as a Representative in the House of Representatives of the U.S. state of Florida.

== Education ==
Ritchie received his bachelor's degree in Business Administration from the University of Florida in 1969. He received his Juris Doctor from UF as well in 1972.

== Career ==
Ritchie served in the Florida House of Representatives in the 2nd district from November 8, 1988, to November 3, 1992, and from the 3rd district from November 3, 1992, to November 3, 1998.

He is president of Gulf Coast Community Bank in Pensacola, Florida.

He is also a Democrat.

== Personal life ==
He lives in Pensacola, Florida with his family.
