= Warren M. Briggs =

American politician

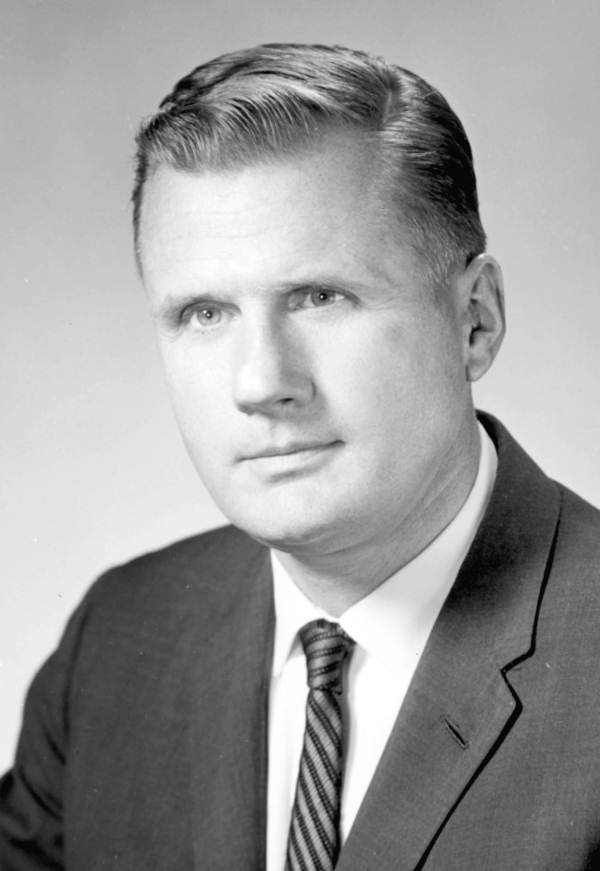
- Briggs in 1966

Member of the Florida House of Representatives from Escambia County
- In office 1966–1967

Member of the Florida House of Representatives from the 2nd district
- In office 1967–1968
- Preceded by: District established
- Succeeded by: Gordon Tyrrell

Mayor of Pensacola, Florida
- In office 1977–1978
- Preceded by: Barney B. Burkes
- Succeeded by: Vincent J. Whibbs Sr.

Personal details
- Born: June 30, 1923 Saint Paul, Minnesota, U.S.
- Died: October 1, 2012 (aged 89)
- Party: Democratic
- Spouse: Gloria Briggs

Warren M. Briggs (June 30, 1923 – October 1, 2012) was an American politician. He served as a Democratic member for the 2nd district of the Florida House of Representatives.

== Life and career ==
Briggs was born in Saint Paul, Minnesota. He served in the United States Air Force.

In 1966, Briggs was elected to the Florida House of Representatives. The next year, he was elected as the first representative for the newly-established 2nd district. He served until 1968, when he was succeeded by Gordon Tyrrell.

Briggs was mayor of Pensacola, Florida from 1977 to 1978.

In 1978, he lost overwhelmingly to Earl Hutto in the open seat race for Florida's 1st congressional district despite outspending him, and then again overwhelmingly to Hutto in 1980 in a year when Ronald Reagan won Florida by a greater margin then any other southern state and Paula Hawkins was elected U.S. Senator, despite outspending him in that election as well.

Briggs died in October 2012, at the age of 89.
