= Michelle Salzman =

American politician (born 1977)

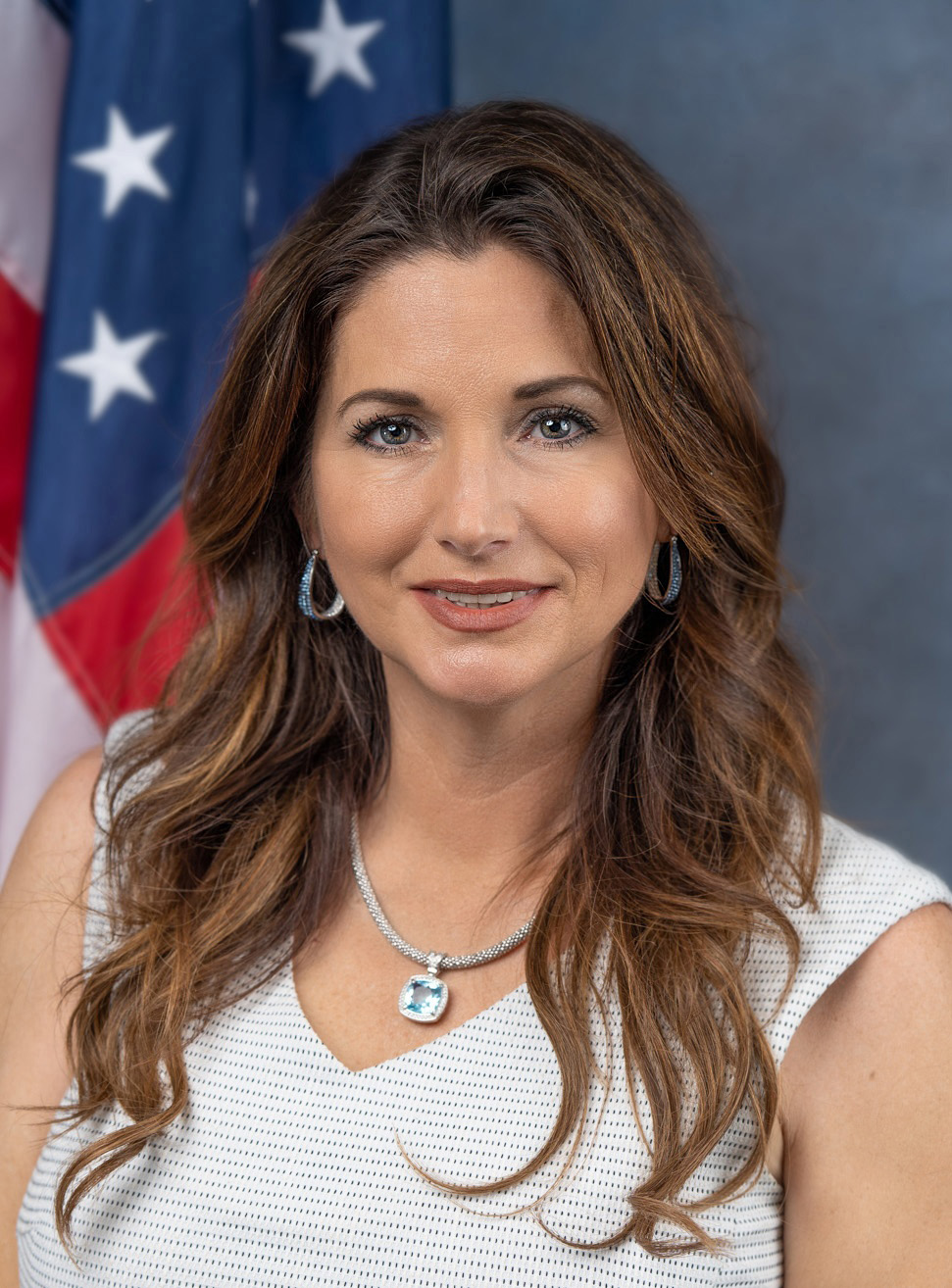

Member of the Florida House of Representatives from the 1st district
- Incumbent
- Assumed office November 3, 2020
- Preceded by: Mike Hill

Personal details
- Born: Michelle Lynn Hisle; July 5, 1977 (age 49) Texas, U.S.
- Party: Republican
- Spouse: Phillip Salzman
- Children: 3
- Education: Pensacola State College (AAS); University of West Florida (BSBA)
- Occupation: Politician; soldier; businesswoman
- Website: Campaign website

Military service
- Allegiance: United States
- Branch: United States Army
- Conflict: Yugoslav Wars

Michelle Salzman (née Hisle, born July 5, 1977) is an American politician, businesswoman, and Army veteran currently serving as a Republican member of the Florida House of Representatives from the 1st District since November 2020. She defeated incumbent Mike Hill in the Republican primary and Democrat Franscine Mathis in the general election. She was re-elected in 2022 and 2024.

Salzman currently serves as the junior most state legislator for Escambia County; her district primarily including the northern portion of Escambia County. In 2023, Salzman gained notoriety for her comments made about the Gaza War.

== Early life and career ==
Salzman was raised in Pensacola, Florida. After graduating high school in 1995, she says she joined the Army when she was 17 to escape an abusive home. Salzman states that her father was an abusive alcoholic and her mother became addicted to opioids when she was in middle school; Salzman has stated that both of her parents died at an early age from opioid addiction. On February 16, 2022, Salzman stated, while debating in support of an anti-abortion bill, that as a child, her uncle regularly sexually abused her and her sister. She served as part of the NATO forces in Bosnia where she says she was raped by her commanding officer while deployed. She got married in the Army, but separated after they had two children. She returned to Pensacola where she became an exotic dancer. She obtained an Associate of Applied Science degree from Pensacola State College

Salzman earned her Bachelor of Science in Business Administration from the University of West Florida.

== Volunteering and politics ==
Salzman worked as an education chair for Pensacola mayor Grover Robinson's transition team and is a former county PTA president and member of the Florida PTA Board of Directors. Salzman served as a "Safe Schools Equality Index Advisory Member" through Equality Florida. The "Safe School Equality Index" is a comprehensive tool designed to assist Florida's Department of Education, district superintendents, school board members, PTA leaders, district staff and partnering youth centered organizations to meet the rising needs of lesbian, gay, bisexual, transgender, gender non-binary and questioning students in Florida's K-12 schools.

=== Florida House of Representatives ===
Salzman was elected to the Florida House of Representatives in 2020 after defeating incumbent Republican Mike Hill in the primary. She was subsequently re-elected in 2022, defeating Hill in a primary rematch.

In March 2021, Salzman was accused by Representative Omari Hardy of calling Representative Webster Barnaby the chamber's "token Black Republican." Salzman vehemently denied making the remark stating "It's an absolute lie,".

In February 2022, Salzman was recorded explaining why she would not co-sponsor a constitutional carry bill in the Florida Legislature. The bill, HB 103 (2022), was not assigned to be heard in any committees or voted on. In the video, Representative Salzman stated the bill would pass during the 2023 legislative session. On January 30, 2023, HB-543 was filed with Salzman as a co-sponsor. The bill passed the Florida House and Senate and was signed into law on April 3, 2023. She was accused of threatening the group that published the recording.

In April 2021, Salzman was quoted as saying that the issue holding her back from prioritizing the cleanup of a toxic landfill in her district was that the surrounding residents were Democrats.

In October 2021, Salzman publicly supported the City of Pensacola's decision to celebrate Indigenous Peoples Day, and attended the city's ceremony. Salzman is a member of the Santa Rosa Band of the Lower Muskogee.

Salzman faced backlash in 2023 after saying "all of them" on the House floor, in response to a question from Angie Nixon "how many [dead Palestinians] will be enough?" Salzman initially denied saying "all of them" before claiming that her comment was simply support for Israel and its right to self-defense.

In 2024, Salzman was notified by the Florida Department of State that her campaign expenditures were being audited for several thousand dollars in irregularities. The audit raised additional criticism of Salzman's record of campaign contributions, including $47,500 from the law firm founded by Fred Levin, and contributions totaling $20,890.25 from the Lewis Bear Company alcohol distributorship.

In November 2024, Salzman expressed interest in running to replace Congressman Matt Gaetz, upon his nomination as US attorney general and subsequent resignation from Congress. Salzman's potential candidacy was met with criticism, with some "noting she is often quietly not taken seriously in Pensacola-area political circles." She proceeded to officially announce her candidacy on the morning of November 19. She withdrew on November 25, after Donald Trump endorsed Florida chief financial officer Jimmy Patronis.

=== Committees ===
(2023)

- Appropriations Committee
  - Health Care Appropriations Subcommittee, Vice Chair
- Health & Human Services Committee, Republican Committee Whip
  - Healthcare Regulation Subcommittee
- Rules Committee

(2024)

- Appropriations Committee
  - Health Care Appropriations Subcommittee
- Health & Human Services Committee
  - Healthcare Regulation Subcommittee, Chair
- Rules Committee

== Controversy ==
=== Comments regarding Palestinians ===
On November 9, 2023, Democratic state representative Angie Nixon, who introduced a resolution calling for a ceasefire in the Gaza war and the release of hostages by Hamas, broke out in tears amid mounting civilian casualties in Gaza. Nixon asked those present in the Florida House, "We are at 10,000 dead Palestinians, how many will be enough?". Salzman then answered, saying, "All of them." Nixon responded by mentioning her comment, saying "One of my colleagues just said all of them, wow." Salzman initially called the controversy "fake", but then said in a statement: "I am so incredibly sorry for even the slightest of suggestions that I would want an entire community erased. My comments were unapologetically towards the Hamas regime — I never said Palestine."

== Electoral history ==
=== 2024 ===
Florida House 1st district general election, 2024
Party	Candidate	Votes	%
Republican	Michelle Salzman	58,623	65.80%
Democratic	Franscine C. Mathis	30,466	34.20%
Total votes		89,089	100%
Republican hold			

=== 2022 ===
Florida House 1st district Republican primary election, 2022
Party	Candidate	Votes	%
Republican	Michelle Salzmam (incumbent)	13,713	65.01%
Republican	Mike Hill	7,382	34.99%
Total votes		21,095	100%

Florida House 1st district general election, 2022
Party	Candidate	Votes	%
Republican	Michelle Salzman	43,026	69.27%
Democratic	Franscine C. Mathis	19,087	30.73%
Total votes		62,113	100%
Republican hold			

=== 2020 ===
Florida House 1st district Republican primary election, 2020
Party	Candidate	Votes	%
Republican	Michelle Salzman	11,081	52.48%
Republican	Mike Hill (incumbent)	10,032	47.52%
Total votes		21,113	100%

Florida House 1st district general election, 2020
Party	Candidate	Votes	%
Republican	Michelle Salzman	57,363	65.30%
Democratic	Franscine C. Mathis	30,485	34.70%
Total votes		87,848	100%
Republican hold			

== Personal life ==
Salzman has three children, two from her previous marriage and one with her husband Phil, with whom she lives in Escambia County. Salzman is a Baptist.

Florida House of Representatives
Preceded by Mike Hill	Member of the Florida House of Representatives from the 1st district 2020–present	Incumbent
