= Joel Rudman =

American politician (born 1970)

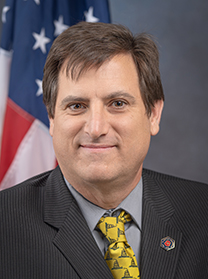
- Official portrait, 2022

Member of the Florida House of Representatives from the 3rd district
- In office November 8, 2022 – January 1, 2025
- Preceded by: Jayer Williamson
- Succeeded by: Nathan Boyles

Personal details
- Born: March 5, 1970 (age 56) Brookhaven, Mississippi, United States
- Party: Republican
- Spouse: Sophie Rudman
- Children: 2
- Education: University of Southern Mississippi (BA); University of Mississippi (MD)

Joel Rudman (born 5 March 1970) is an American politician and physician who served as a state representative for the 3rd district in the Florida House of Representatives from 2022 through 2025. Rudman resides in Navarre, his legislative district's largest community, and is a member of the Republican Party.

== Career ==
In addition to being a state representative, Rudman is also a Board Certified family physician. He operates a local medical clinic called Holley Navarre Medical Clinic. He also worked for 13 years as a NASCAR staff physician at Daytona International Speedway.

=== Florida House of Representatives ===
Rudman was elected to the Florida House of Representatives in 2022. He ran for office after being accused by the American Board of Family Medicine of “denigrating (their) vaccine efforts”.

==== Committees ====
- Commerce Committee
  - Insurance & Banking Subcommittee
- Healthcare Regulation Subcommittee
- Higher Education Appropriations Subcommittee
- Postsecondary Education & Workforce Subcommittee

== Political positions ==
=== Healthcare and COVID-19 ===
Rudman has been transparent about being vaccinated against COVID while arguing against vaccine mandates and against masking mandates. Rudman has also criticized the closing of businesses and lockdowns related to the COVID-19 pandemic. His campaign website attests that closing of religious spaces for public health purposes is an infraction against the "freedom to worship as you choose."

In a series of Tweets, Rudman has described COVID-19 as a biological weapon.

Rudman sponsored the Protections of Medical Conscience Act (SB 1580/HB 1403), which was passed in the Florida Senate and House of Representatives in early 2023, later signed by Governor Ron DeSantis. The legislation, which allows healthcare providers and insurers the right to opt out of procedures that go against their conscience, has been criticized by local Democrats as being discriminatory towards LGBT people. Rudman has said, "There's nothing in this bill that legalizes discrimination", and explained that the bill is his "entire reason for being here in the Florida Legislature."

In 2023, Representative Rudman publicly supported the idea of Medicaid expansion in Florida.

=== Gun rights ===
Rudman supports "unfettered Second Amendment rights" on his campaign website. In 2023, he sponsored a bill repealing the statute that allowed unlimited time for background checks in Florida; the bill failed to pass.

=== Navarre incorporation ===
Rudman is supportive of incorporating the unincorporated community of Navarre in Santa Rosa County.

=== Public safety ===
Rudman believes that swifter use of the death penalty and funding of asylums would improve public safety.

== Electoral history ==
On August 23, 2022, Rudman won the Republican primary election against Mariya Calkins with 64% of the vote. Rudman faced a write-in candidate in the 2022 general election and won.

Rudman resigned from the Florida House in November, 2024 to run for Congress in Florida's 1st Congressional District. He received less than 10% of the vote in the Republican primary.
