= R. W. Peaden =

American politician

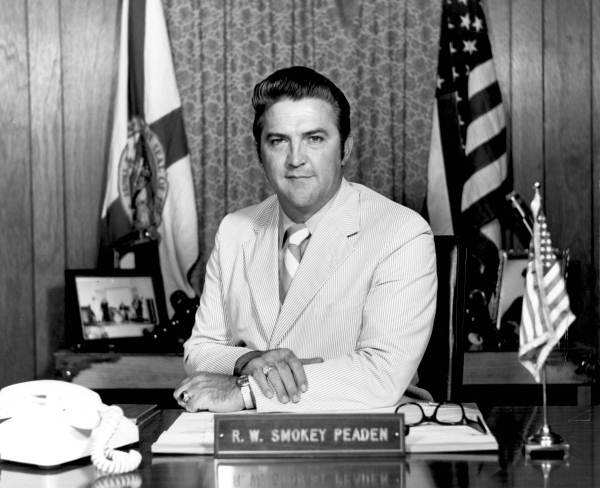
- Peaden in 1972

Member of the Florida House of Representatives from the 2nd district
- In office 1972–1976
- Preceded by: Gordon Tyrrell
- Succeeded by: Tom Patterson

Personal details
- Born: May 10, 1933 Milton, Florida, U.S.
- Died: March 8, 1999 (aged 65)
- Party: Democratic
- Spouse: Barbara Creel

R. W. Peaden (May 10, 1933 – March 8, 1999) was an American politician. He served as a Democratic member for the 2nd district of the Florida House of Representatives.

== Life and career ==
Peaden was born in Milton, Florida.

In 1972, Peaden was elected to represent the 2nd district of the Florida House of Representatives, succeeding Gordon Tyrrell. He served until 1976, when he was succeeded by Tom Patterson.

Peaden died in March 1999, at the age of 65.
