= Florida's 1st House of Representatives district =

American legislative district

Florida's 1st State House of Representatives district
Representative
Michelle Salzman; R–Pensacola
- Demographics: 70.3% White; 21.8% Black; 4.1% Hispanic; 2.6% Asian; 1.0% Native American; 0.01% Hawaiian/Pacific Islander; 1.1% Other
- Population (2010) • Voting age: 156,303; 121,724

Florida's 1st House district elects one member of the Florida House of Representatives. The district is represented by Michelle Salzman. This district is located in the Florida Panhandle and encompasses part of the Pensacola metropolitan area. The district covers the northern portion of Escambia County. The largest city in the district is Ferry Pass. As of the 2010 Census, the district's population is 156,030.

This district contains the University of West Florida, located in Ferry Pass.

Bolley Johnson served as the Speaker of the Florida House of Representatives from 1992 until 1994.

== Representatives from 1967 to the present ==
Representatives by party affiliation
Party	Representatives
Republican	7
Democratic	5

Representatives from Florida's 1st district
#	Name	Term of service	Residence	Political party	Counties represented
1	Gordon W. Wells	1967–1968	Jay	Democratic	Escambia
2	Roy Hess	1968–1972	Pensacola	Democratic	Escambia
3	Grover Robinson III	1972–1982	Pensacola	Democratic	Escambia
4	Tom Tobiassen	1982–1992	Pensacola	Democratic	Escambia
5	Bolley Johnson	1992–1994	Milton	Democratic	Escambia, Okaloosa, Santa Rosa
6	Jerry Burroughs	1994–1998	Cantonment	Republican	Escambia, Okaloosa, Santa Rosa
7	Jeff Miller	1998–2001	Chumuckla	Republican	Escambia, Okaloosa, Santa Rosa
8	Greg Evers	2001–2010	Milton	Republican	Escambia, Okaloosa, Santa Rosa
9	Doug Broxson	2010–2012	Pensacola	Republican	Escambia, Okaloosa, Santa Rosa
10	Clay Ingram	2012–2018	Pensacola	Republican	Escambia
11	Mike Hill	2018–2020	Pensacola	Republican	Escambia
12	Michelle Salzman	2020–present	Pensacola	Republican	Escambia

== See also ==
- Florida's 1st Senate district
- Florida's 1st congressional district
