= Florida's 3rd House of Representatives district =

American legislative district

Florida's 3rd State House of Representatives district
Representative
Nathan Boyles; R–Holt
- Demographics: 87.5% White; 5.7% Black; 4.2% Hispanic; 1.7% Asian; 0.9% Native American; 0.1% Hawaiian/Pacific Islander; 1.0% Other
- Population (2010) • Voting age: 158,797; 120,717

Florida's 3rd House district elects one member of the Florida House of Representatives. This district is located in the Florida Panhandle, and encompasses part of the Emerald Coast, as well as parts of the Pensacola metropolitan area and the Crestview metropolitan area. The district covers most of Santa Rosa County and the top half of Okaloosa County. The largest city in the district is Navarre. As of the 2010 census, the district's population is 158,797.

This district has a large military presence, serving as a bedroom community for the Naval Air Station Pensacola to the west and Eglin Air Force Base to the East. The district also contains Naval Air Station Whiting Field, as well as several Naval outlying landing fields.

There was a vacancy between December 31, 2006, and February 27, 2007, as the incumbent, Holly Benson, was appointed Secretary of the Florida Department of Business and Professional Regulation by Governor-elect Charlie Crist. Gulf Breeze City Councillor Clay Ford won a special election to fill the seat.

== Representatives from 1967 to the present ==
Representatives by party affiliation
Party	Representatives
Republican	7
Democratic	6

Representatives from Florida's 3rd district
#	Name	Term of service	Residence	Political party	Counties represented
1	Phil Ashler	1967–1968	Pensacola	Democratic	Escambia
2	Tom Tobiassen	1968–1974	Pensacola	Democratic	Escambia
3	Clyde Hagler	1974–1982	Pensacola	Democratic	Escambia
4	Grover Robinson III	1982–1986	Pensacola	Democratic	Escambia
5	Tom Banjanin	1986–1992	Pensacola	Republican	Escambia
6	Buzz Ritchie	1992–1998	Pensacola	Democratic	Escambia
7	DeeDee Ritchie	1998–2000	Pensacola	Democratic	Escambia
8	Holly Benson	2000–2006	Pensacola	Republican	Escambia (until 2002); Escambia, Santa Rosa (2002–2006)
	Vacant	2006–2007			
9	Clay Ford	2007–2012	Pensacola	Republican	Escambia, Santa Rosa
10	Doug Broxson	2012–2016	Pensacola	Republican	Okaloosa, Santa Rosa
11	Jayer Williamson	2016–2022	Pace	Republican	Okaloosa, Santa Rosa
12	Joel Rudman	2022–2025	Navarre	Republican	Okaloosa, Santa Rosa
	Vacant	2025			
13	Nathan Boyles	2025–present	Holt	Republican	Okaloosa, Santa Rosa

== See also ==
- Florida's 1st Senate district
- Florida's 2nd Senate district
- Florida's 1st congressional district
