= History of Pensacola, Florida =

The history of Pensacola, Florida, begins long before the Spanish claimed founding of the modern city in 1698. The area around present-day Pensacola was inhabited by Native American peoples for thousands of years.

Spanish explorers arrived in the 16th century. In 1559 Tristan de Luna established a short-lived settlement at Pensacola Bay; it was the first multi-year European settlement in what is now the continental United States but was abandoned after two years. In the late 17th century the Spanish returned to the area to found the modern Pensacola as an outpost from which to defend their claims to Spanish Florida. The city's strategic but isolated position, combined with continued European rivalries played out in North America, led to it changing hands among different Western powers a number of times. At different times it was held by the Spanish, the French, the British, the United States, and the Confederate States of America.

== Etymology ==
This area was first documented as "Panzacola" in 1686, when a maritime expedition, headed by Juan Enríquez Barroto and Antonio Romero, visited Pensacola Bay in February 1686. Barroto and Romero had orders to survey the entire northern Gulf coast from San Marcos de Apalache (near Tallahassee) westward, looking for the new French "lost colony" of Fort St. Louis, which René Robert Cavelier, Sieur de La Salle had established at Matagorda Bay in 1685. Other historians have hypothesized that the name is a slight deviation from "Pensicola."

== Prehistory ==
The area was largely devoid of indigenous Native American inhabitants. Given the area's advantages, it was frequently a destination for hunting and fishing by Creek people from present-day southern Alabama and Georgia.

The best-known Pensacola Culture site in terms of archeology is the Bottle Creek site, a large site located on a low swampy island north of Mobile, Alabama. This site has at least 18 large earthwork mounds; five of which are arranged around a central plaza, in a pattern typical of many moundbuilding cultures. Its main occupation was from 1250 to 1550 CE. It was a ceremonial center for the Pensacola people, and a gateway to their society. This site would have had easy access by a dugout canoe, the main mode of transportation used by the people; they traveled primarily by the waterways rather than through the thick vegetation.

The Fort Walton Mound archaeological site is located about 40 miles east of downtown Pensacola. The mound was built about 850 CE by a regional variation of the Mississippian culture.

The area's recorded history begins in the 16th century, when the first European explorers came there. Early exploration of Pensacola Bay (called Polonza or Ochuse by the Spanish) spanned decades, with members of expeditions under Pánfilo de Narváez (1528), and Hernando de Soto (1539) visiting the area.

== First Spanish period (1559–1719) ==
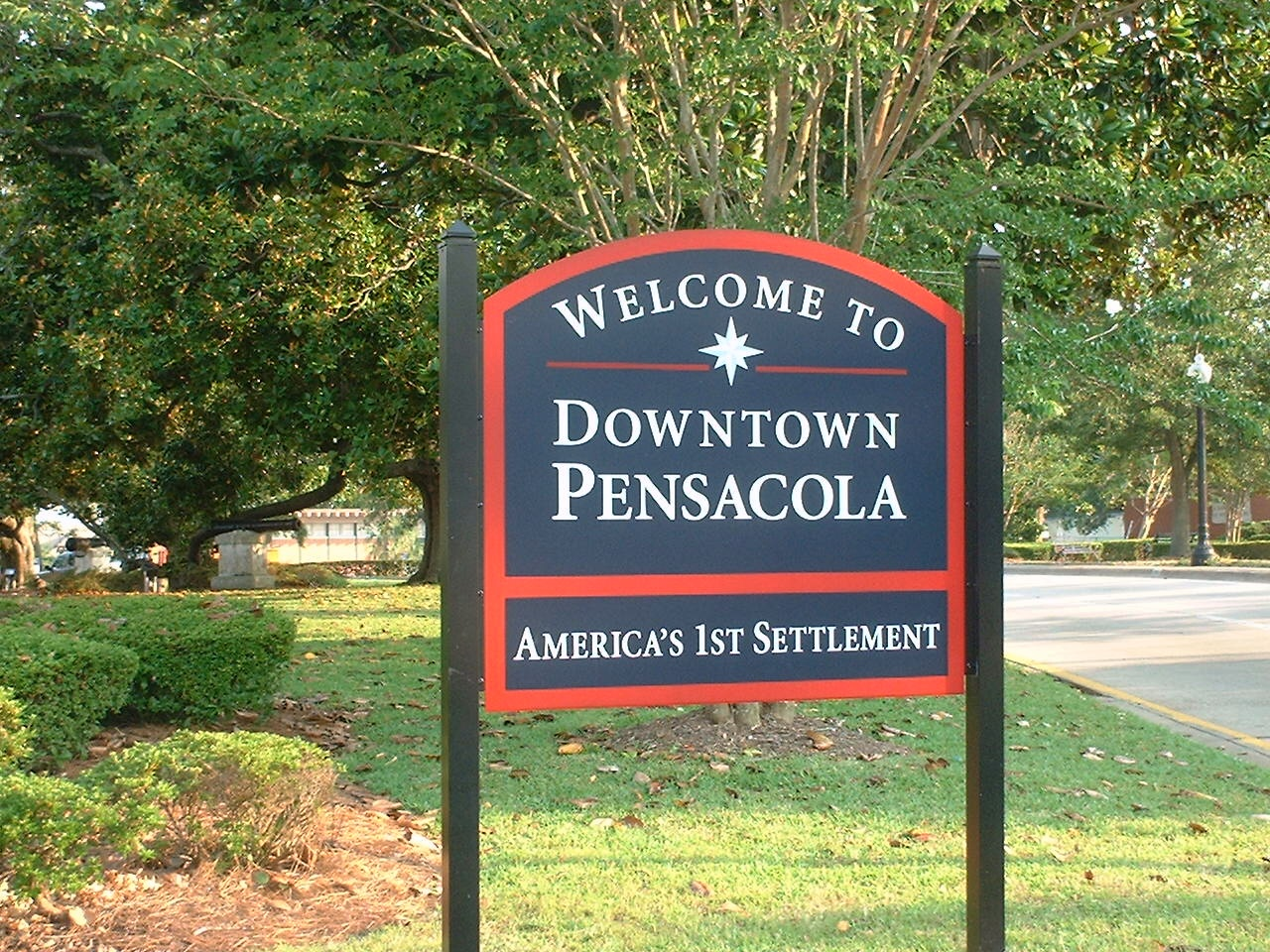
Pensacola is located on the site of the first European-established settlements in what is now the continental United States

European exploration of the area began in the 16th century. In 1516 Diego Miruelo may have been the first European to sail into Pensacola Bay. Members of the expeditions of Pánfilo de Narváez in 1528 and Hernando de Soto in 1539 visited the bay, during the latter of which Francisco Maldonado recorded its name as the Bay of Ochuse, related to the Indian province.

The first Spanish settlement expedition in the region was large but short-lived, entering the bay on August 15, 1559, and led by Don Tristán de Luna y Arellano. It consisted of some 1,500 people on 11 ships from Vera Cruz, Mexico. This was the first multi-year European settlement in the territory of what is now the United States. But, weeks later, the colony was decimated by a hurricane on September 19, 1559, which killed an unknown number of sailors, sank six ships, grounded a seventh, and ruined supplies. The survivors struggled to survive, most moving inland to central Alabama for several months in 1560 before returning to the coast, but after two years, the effort was abandoned in 1561. Some of the survivors eventually sailed to Santa Elena (today's Parris Island, South Carolina), but another storm hit there. Survivors made their way to Cuba and finally returned to Pensacola, where the remaining 50 at Pensacola were taken back to Veracruz. The Viceroy's advisers later concluded that northwest Florida was too dangerous to settle. They largely ignored it for 137 years.

In 1693, Mexican Viceroy Gaspar de Sandoval Silva y Mendoza, the Conde de Galve (1688–1696), sent General Andrés de Pez to explore the north Gulf coast from Pensacola Bay to the mouth of the Mississippi River. Carlos de Sigüenza y Góngora, a renowned Mexican scientist, mathematician and historian, accompanied Pez. The Pez-Sigüenza expedition consisted of two ships, leaving Veracruz in late March 1693 and reaching Pensacola in early April. The Spanish re-christened Pensacola Bay as Bahía Santa María de Galve (after the Virgin Mary and the Conde de Galve, then Viceroy of Mexico). After their return to Mexico, Sigüenza wrote a glowing report and enthusiastically endorsed the notion of a settlement on the bay in his letter to the viceroy.

One of the expedition's goals was to determine how flora and fauna in the Pensacola region could benefit the Spanish. Charged with such a task, Siguenza, prone to exaggeration, described a veritable paradise, teeming with food resources and ample economic opportunities. The Mexican savant also wrote detailed descriptions of waterways in the area and described abundant trees on Blackwater River and East River as "lofty and stout, suitable for building ships of any draft". He minimized problems with the site. The Spanish Crown endorsed the settlement of Pensacola Bay on June 13, 1694. A year later, in 1695, Andrés de Arriola inspected both the mouth of the Mississippi River and Pensacola Bay but did not find the bay to be the paradise Sigüenza had described. Preoccupied with King William's War (1689–1697), the Spanish delayed settlement of Pensacola until 1698.

Previously, Tristan de Luna had named the bay as Bahía Santa María de Filipina when he founded the area's first settlement. In 1757 Panzacola was affirmed as the area's name by a royal order of Spanish King Ferdinand VI.

The Spanish resettled Pensacola in November 1698 under the direction of the first governor, Andrés de Arriola. They built three presidios in Pensacola during the following decades, in 1719, 1722 and 1754.

- Presidio Santa Maria de Galve (1698–1719): this included fort San Carlos de Austria (east of present Fort Barrancas) and a village with church; in 1719, the area was captured by the French. A fire broke out in 1722 after a hurricane, and the French burned down the settlement before releasing it to the Spanish. It was abandoned.
- Presidio Isla de Santa Rosa (1722–1752): this was on the western end of Santa Rosa Island near the site of present Fort Pickens. After hurricanes battered the island in 1741 and 1752, the settlers relocated to the mainland. Another hurricane in 1762 destroyed the remnants on the island.
- Presidio San Miguel de Panzacola (1754-1763): following this disastrous hurricane, the Spanish built a third and final settlement, Presidio San Miguel de Panzacola, about five miles east of the first presidio in the present-day historic district of downtown Pensacola.

The present city of Pensacola was established by the Spanish in 1698 as a buffer against French settlement in Louisiana. San Marcos de Apalache, another important Spanish settlement, was established in 1733 in Wakulla County. The Spanish settlers established a Creole culture at the frontier garrison, where Europeans were mostly males. They brought the Roman Catholic Church and tried to convert the Pensacola, as well as African slaves whom they imported as laborers. Marriages and unions took place among all three peoples, resulting in numerous mixed-race descendants, whom the Spanish classified in ranges. They described children of Pensacola-Spanish unions as mestizo and children of African-Spanish unions as mulattos. Pensacola Indian identity was recorded by the church authorities, a practice that continued until about 1840. The early years of settlement were extremely tenuous; the soil was poor for cultivation of agricultural crops known to the Spanish, and the settlement was irregularly resupplied. It was considered an unpopular military posting due to tropical disease, heat, and the poor conditions.

French explorers founded Mobile in 1699, located 59 miles overland to the west, and also on the Gulf of Mexico. This settlement represented competition and a threat to the Spanish, who had opposed the French in the Nine Years' War. The Spanish colonial authorities also discovered that Carolinian traders were entering the colony to trade with the Creek people, establishing informal anti-Spanish alliances. During Queen Anne's War, Creek war parties, aided by Carolinian raiders, launched several raids in the Pensacola region, and besieged the city twice in 1707. These raiding parties also raided settlements belonging to the Pensacola people, who responded by retreating into the cities of Pensacola, Mobile, and St.Augustine.

== French period (1719–1722) ==
Governor of French Louisiana, Jean-Baptiste Le Moyne de Bienville, took Pensacola for France on May 14, 1719, arriving with his fleet and a large ground force of allied Indian warriors. The Spanish commander of Pensacola, Metamoras, had not heard that war had been declared between France and Spain, and his garrison was so small that he believed it would be useless to resist. At four o'clock in the afternoon, he surrendered on the conditions that private citizens and property should not be disturbed, and the garrison should be allowed to march out with honors of war and be transported to Havana, Cuba in French vessels. Bienville left a garrison of about sixty men at Pensacola and sailed away.

The French, with small settlements further west at Mobile and Biloxi, held Pensacola during this period. Overall, French influences were generally dominant among the Creoles on the Gulf Coast west of Pensacola, with Spanish influences dominant among Creoles in the modern Panhandle. A hurricane drove the French from Pensacola in 1722 and they burned the town before leaving. The Spanish moved the town from the storm-vulnerable barrier island to the mainland.

== Second Spanish period (1722–1763) ==
The area was rebuilt, but it was ravaged by hurricanes in 1752 and 1761. Population growth remained modest during this period, which was characterized by Spanish missionary work with Indians and the development of Pensacola as an important port and military outpost. Conflict with French and British interests was common. Spain's informal alliance with France meant that the greatest threat to colonial Florida was from British privateers, smugglers and traders. Their ability to sell goods to the Indians and Spanish colonists more cheaply than companies from Spain did diminished local support for the Bourbon monarchy in Madrid.

== British West Florida (1763–1781) ==
British plan for Pensacola, 1765

Following Great Britain's victory over both France and Spain in the Seven Years War (known in America as the French and Indian War), in 1763 the British took control of Pensacola under the terms of the Treaty of Paris (1763). During the period of British rule, the area began to prosper following establishment of the Panton, Leslie Company in 1785, which had a trading post attracting Creek people from southern Alabama and Georgia. The British designated Pensacola as the capital of British West Florida and developed the mainland area of fort San Carlos de Barrancas, building the Royal Navy Redoubt. Surveyor and engineer Elias Durnford laid out the town in its current form, creating the Seville Square district. Working with Durnford was George Gauld, a British naval surveyor. He also painted several views of Pensacola during the British period.

According to a later description of his work:

Pensacola was becoming something more than a garrison town by the time Gauld made this splendid painting. There were now a number of fine houses and structures and an especially impressive Governor's Palace while the fort had been strengthened and made more efficient. It seems likely the town had over two hundred houses made of timber. Pensacola was still, however, mainly a military and trading outpost, its principal link to the outside world being primarily by sea."

After Spain joined the rebels of the American Revolution in 1779, Spanish forces captured East Florida and West Florida, regaining Pensacola. They held this area from 1781 to 1819. Following the War of 1812 (which was ended in the Treaty of Ghent), the United States negotiated with Spain to take control of Florida. In an 1819 Transcontinental Treaty (Adams-Onis) with the United States, Spain renounced its claims to West Florida and ceded East Florida to the U.S. for US$5 million. In 1821, with Andrew Jackson as provisional governor, Pensacola was annexed by the United States.

At the end of the massive French and Indian War of 1756–1763, the British gained access to inland areas as far west as the Mississippi River and the French were largely expelled from the North American mainland. Louisiana was transferred from French to Spanish control. West and East Florida were transferred from French and Spanish control to British control. The British colony of West Florida, with its capital at Pensacola, included all of the Panhandle west of the Apalachicola River, as well as southwestern Alabama, southern Mississippi, and the Florida parishes of modern Louisiana. West Florida included the important cities of Pensacola, Mobile, Biloxi, Baton Rouge, and, disputably, Natchez. In 1763, the British laid out Pensacola's modern street plan. British East Florida, with its capital at Saint Augustine, included the rest of modern Florida, including the eastern part of the Panhandle.

During the American Revolution (1775–1783), the state of Georgia joined the Patriot cause, but East and West Florida, like the Canadian colonies, remained loyal to the British. Many Loyalists or "Tories", loyal to the king, relocated to Florida during this period. Like the French, the Spanish allied with the American rebels. In 1781, in the Battle of Pensacola, the Spanish attacked the British and succeeded in capturing West Florida for Spain. At the end of the war, with the United States gaining independence, Britain transferred East Florida to Spain. The British colonists left, but Spain sent only a few soldiers and settlers to the city.

== Third Spanish period (1781–1819) ==
The Spanish recaptured Pensacola in 1781 and retained control until 1821 (excepting three short-lived invasions by American General Andrew Jackson in 1813, 1814, and 1818). It developed as a frontier garrison town and trading post, where European men took Creek and African women as partners and developed mixed-race families. In 1821 under the Adams-Onís Treaty, Spain ceded all of Spanish Florida to the United States in exchange for payment.

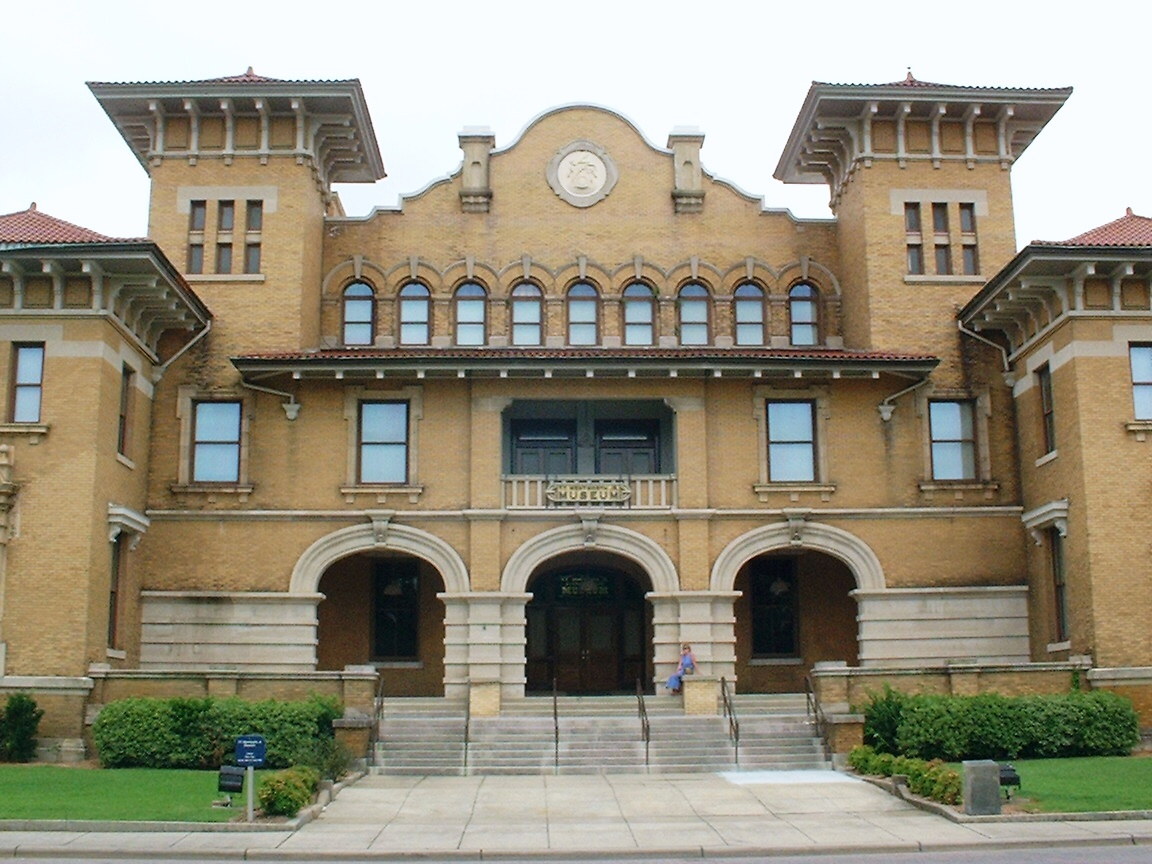
The Pensacola Museum of History, built as the City Hall, is in the 19th-century mission style, reminiscent of the Alamo.

After exchanges of land with the British following the American Revolutionary War, in North America the Spanish controlled the entire Gulf Coast and Mississippi River Valley. The United States thought of the Mississippi River and New Orleans as vital to its shipment and trade of such American goods such as cotton, tobacco, and corn. It gained permission from Spain to use the river, but always subject to Spanish control. American Southern settlers of inland Alabama and riverfront Mississippi were rapidly developing large cotton plantations to meet growing demand for the product. They wanted to expel the remaining Indians from the entire Southeast east of the Mississippi River.

After the transfer of the vast Louisiana Territory from Spain to France at the end of the 18th century, and the subsequent purchase of the region by the United States in 1803, Spanish East and West Florida were surrounded by American Southern states and territories. Anglo-American settlement of West Florida increased and the Spanish, busy with growing rebellions throughout Mexico and South America, were not able to focus on fortifying the region. In 1810, American settlers in the part of Florida west of the Pearl River (today the boundary between Louisiana and Mississippi) declared the West Florida Republic a state independent from Spain. The region was annexed into the new state of Louisiana in 1812.

In August 1814, British troops landed in Pensacola during what would be one of the last campaigns of the War of 1812. The British then began to encourage Native American raiding parties on farms and plantations. General Andrew Jackson would use this as a pretext to invade and capture Pensacola in November of that same year.

The residents of the prosperous Alabama and Mississippi territories, eager to avoid being trapped in landlocked states without seaports, agitated to annex more of West Florida. They succeeded in doing so with the aforementioned military aid of General Andrew Jackson. He captured much of West Florida in the 1810s. He briefly returned Pensacola to Spain but areas further west became part of the new states of Mississippi (1817) and Alabama (1819).

In 1819, the United States captured Pensacola again, increasing pressure against Spain. An 1820 Spanish census recorded 181 households, with about one third of mixed race: typically a white man with a woman of black or mulatto ancestry, and their children. There were also some mixed-race residents of Creek ancestry. French and Spanish Creoles were in the majority. In 1821, all of modern Florida was transferred to the United States, which paid Spain for the territory. Residents voted to become part of Alabama. But, officials in Florida and the US determined that Pensacola, then the largest city and most important port, would remain as part of the new Florida Territory of the United States. This established the current boundaries of the state.

== Antebellum (1821–1860) ==
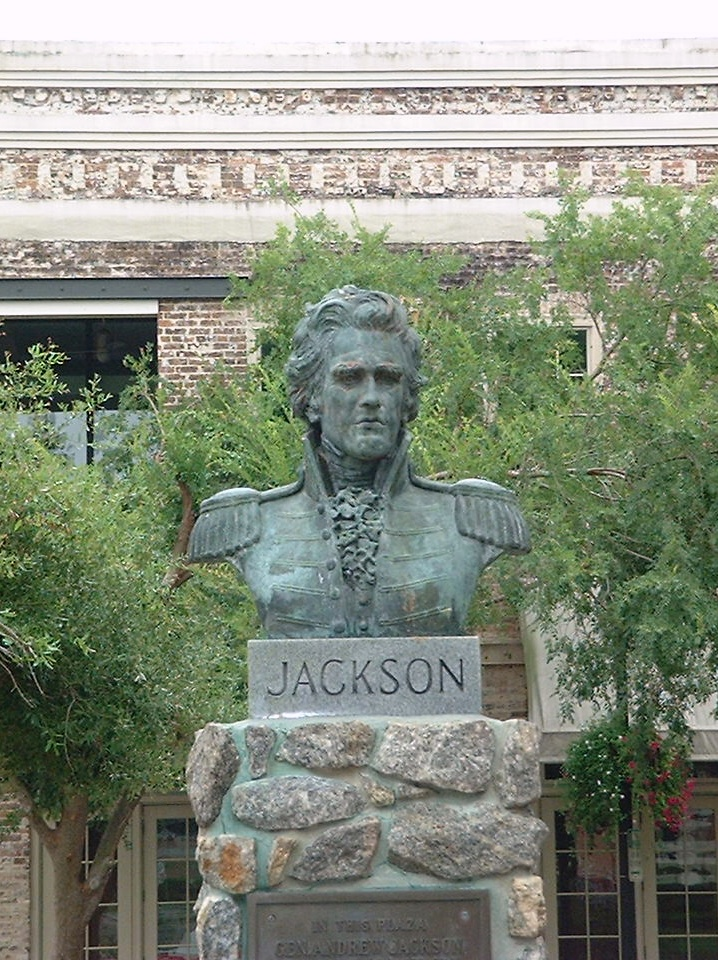
A bust of Andrew Jackson at the Plaza Ferdinand VII, where Jackson was sworn in as governor.

In 1825, the area for the Pensacola Navy Yard was designated and Congress appropriated $6,000 for a lighthouse. In 1827 settlers established the first permanent Protestant congregation (First United Methodist Church).

The Pensacola area is home to three historic U.S. forts, Fort Barrancas, Fort Pickens, and Fort McRee. Barrancas National Cemetery is located here. The city and Fort Barrancas were the site of the 1814 Battle of Pensacola. Fort Pickens was completed in 1834. It is one of the few Southern forts to have been held by the United States throughout the American Civil War.

Andrew Jackson served as Florida's first territorial governor, residing at the capital of Pensacola. He was noted for his persecution of Indians and Creoles, many of whom left the territory. An increasing number of Anglo-American settlers came, including many planters who brought their black slaves. To determine a location for a territorial capital, riders on horseback were sent on the Old Spanish Trail from the territory's two main cities, east from Pensacola and west from St. Augustine. The riders met at the Indian village of Tallahassee, which was designated as the new territorial capital city. With the development of large cotton plantations, Florida's growing population was 50% enslaved African Americans. In the Panhandle, most slaves outside Pensacola were held by people in Tallahassee and in the plantation counties near the Georgia border, notably Jackson, Gadsden, Leon, and Jefferson. Near the coast, the soil had more sand and was less useful for plantation agriculture.

On March 3, 1845, Florida was admitted to the Union as the 27th state. Its admission had been slowed as the United States struggled to remove the Seminole Indians. After three Seminole Wars, it defeated some, forcing their removal to Indian Territory in what is now Oklahoma. The remaining Seminoles had retreated to the Everglades and were never defeated. Due to rising tensions over slavery, Congress had decided not to alter the balance between slave and free states. Florida's admission was delayed until a free territory was ready for admission as a state. It was admitted the same year as Iowa. North Florida, including the Panhandle, remained the most populated part of the state.

In the Pensacola area, the local economy grew rich through the lumber industry, based on the abundant forests in the area, ease of shipping with the good harbor, and entrepreneurship. Starting in the 1830s steam power greatly increased the efficiency of the saw mills that produced finished lumber for export. Entrepreneurs included prominent civil and social leaders, including alderman Alexander McVoy, Joseph Forsyth and E. E. Simpson (who jointly owned one of the largest operations in the state), and W. Main L. Criglar (whose combined lumber and shipping interests produced a personal fortune of more than $300,000).

== Civil War ==
Company B of the 9th Mississippi, a confederate camp in Pensacola, Florida, in 1861.

On January 10, 1861, Florida became the third state to secede from the Union to join the newly formed Confederate States of America. Fort Pickens, one of three forts guarding the entrance to Pensacola Bay, was held by Federal troops, and remaining Union forces in the city also evacuated there. In the Battle of Santa Rosa Island in October 1861, Fort Pickens repulsed a Confederate advance to remain in Union hands, as it did throughout the war. In May 1862 Pensacola was conquered by U.S. troops when General Braxton Bragg evacuated; most of the city and surrounding area was subsequently burned. Residents evacuated inland to Greenville, Alabama.

Several engagements are noted to have taken place in or around Pensacola, likewise in the nearby city of Milton, Florida.

The Confederate secretary of the Navy, Stephen Mallory, was from Pensacola. He is buried in the city's historic Saint Michael's Cemetery.

The city produced at least two militia companies who fought for the Confederacy, the Pensacola Rifle Rangers, and the Pensacola Guards.

== Post-war 19th century ==
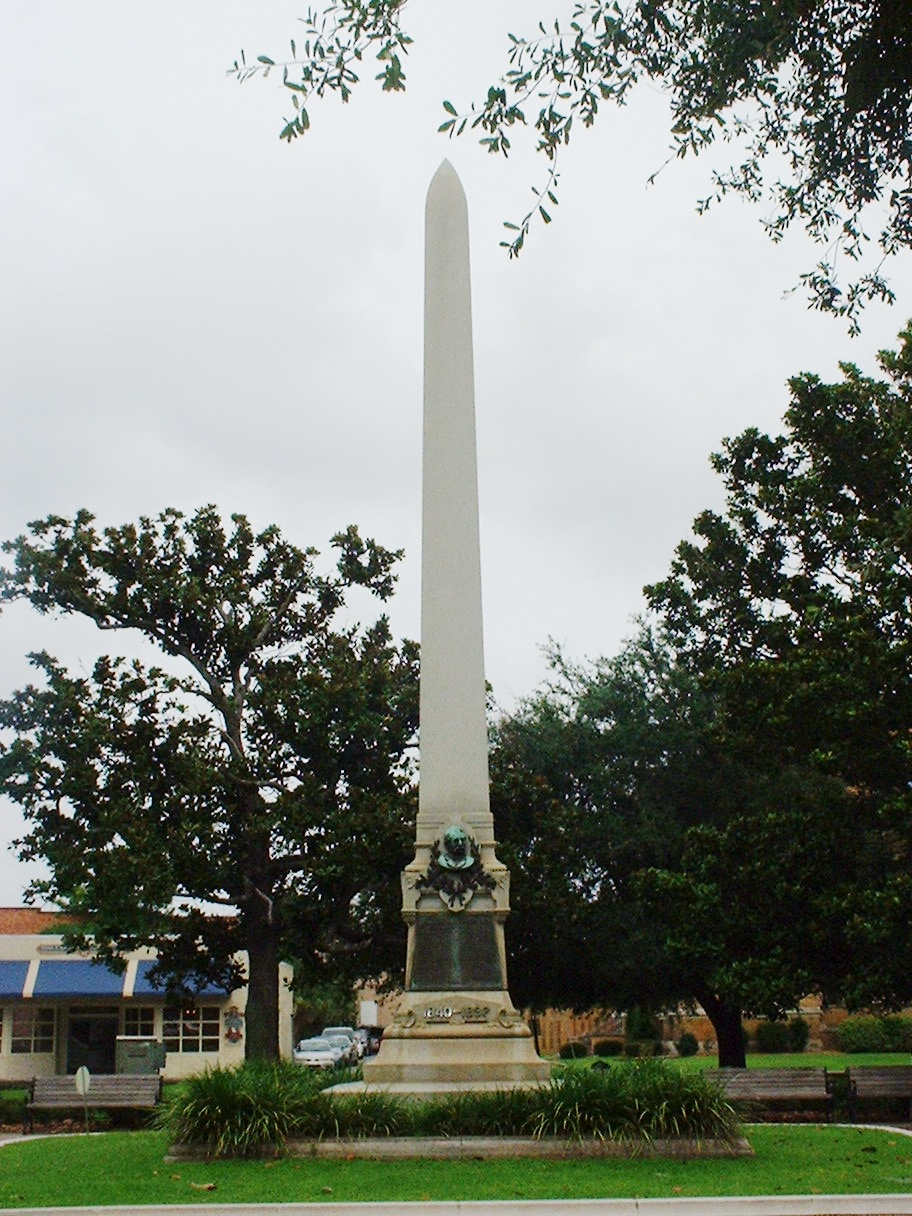
General William Dudley Chipley helped rebuild Pensacola after the Civil War. An obelisk was erected in his honor at the Plaza Ferdinand VII.

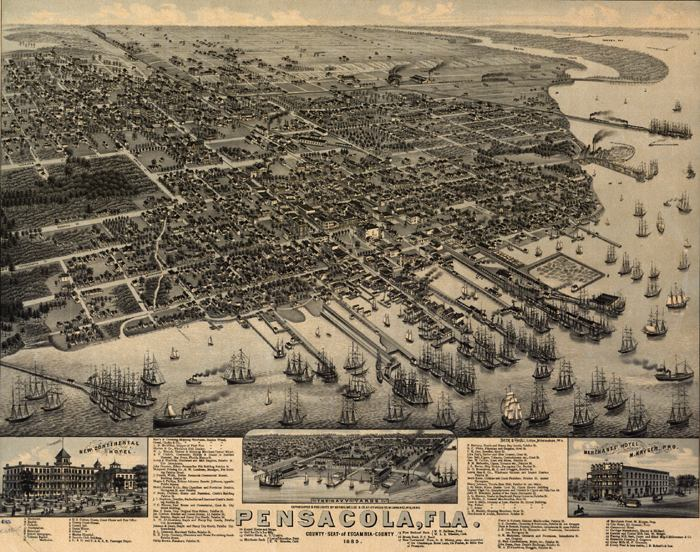
Pensacola, 1885

Emancipation and the conclusion of the War were followed throughout the plantation districts of the South by a period of tumultuous struggle over the rights of black laborers, the political rights of African Americans generally and, temporarily, the political rights of those who took up arms against the Union. While devastating for many former white Confederate veterans, newly emancipated African Americans saw more political freedoms than ever. Pensacola and Escambia County had more African-American political representation than ever before or since. Florida was readmitted to the Union on 25 June 1868. In the late 19th century, Florida, like other southern states, passed a new constitution and other laws that disfranchised most African Americans, using tools like poll taxes, literacy tests, and grandfather clauses, totally closing them out of the political system. In 1878, Salvador T. Pons, the first African-American mayor of Pensacola, was elected.

Cotton, worked largely by the sharecropper descendants of freedmen, remained crucial to the economy, but the South's reliance on agriculture slowed its progress. In the early 20th century, crops were destroyed by boll weevil infestation that moved throughout the South. Slowly economic diversification and urbanization reached the region. Vast pine forests, their wood used to produce paper, became an economic basis. A brickmaking industry thrived at the turn of the twentieth century.

Shipping declined in importance, but the military and manufacturing became prominent. Harvesting of fish and other seafood are also vital. Aside from cotton and pine trees, major crops include peanuts, soybeans, and corn. The Historic Pensacola Museum of Industry gives a detailed account of these turn-of-the-century foundations of the local economy.

== Twentieth Century ==
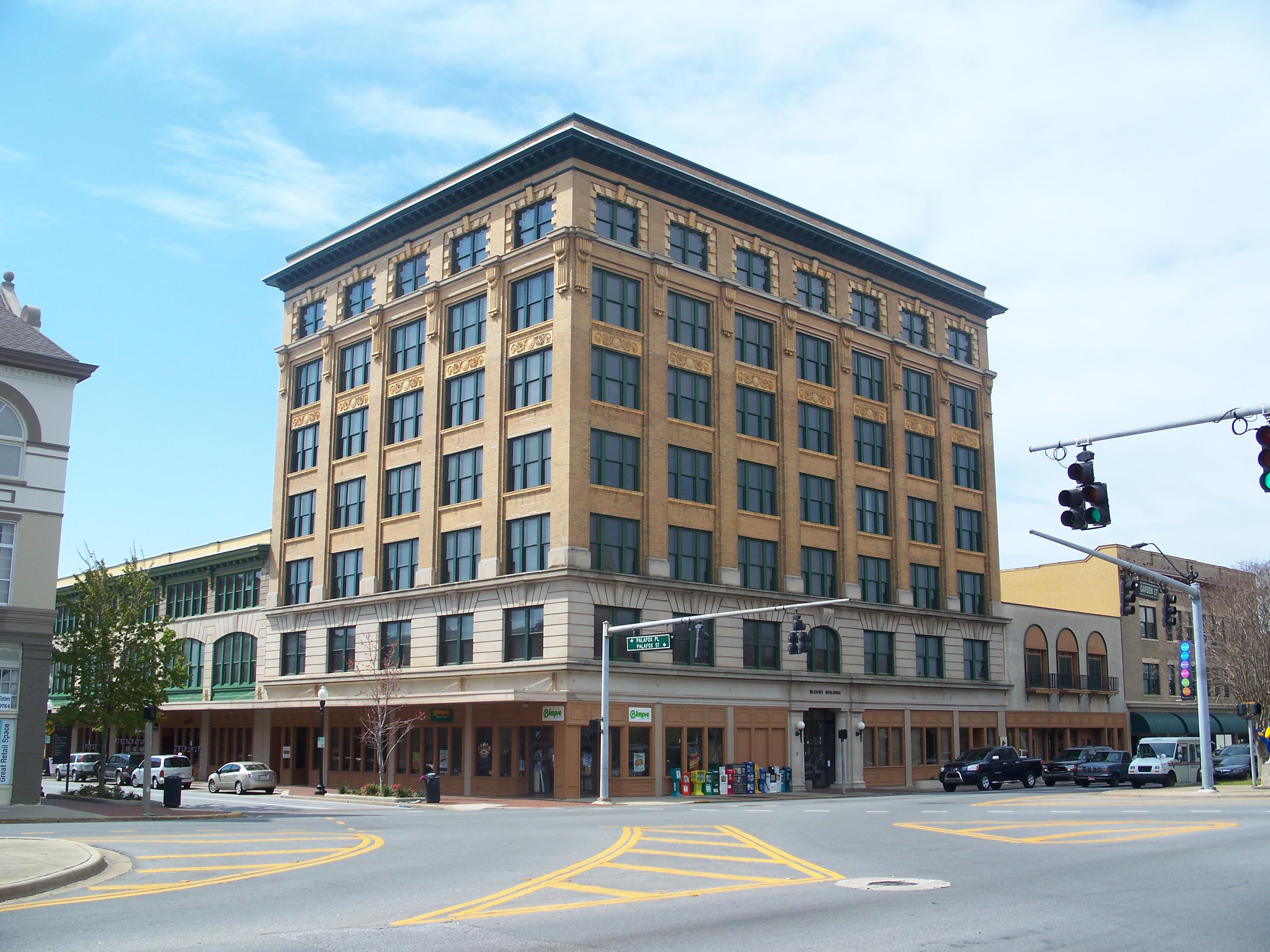
Blount Building, 1907, in the Palafox Historic District

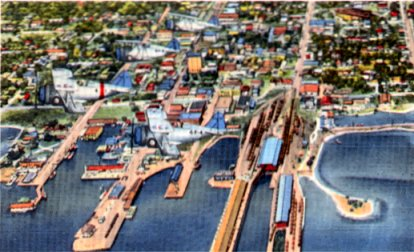
Aerial cartoon view of Pensacola ca. mid-1930s

With strong cultural ties to the old South, Florida and Pensacola had a racially segregated society that imposed Jim Crow since the period of whites regaining political domination following Reconstruction. African Americans in Florida began a long struggle to regain their civil rights, with the movement growing in the 1950s and 1960s, after decades of being excluded from the political system and being treated as second-class citizens.

In 1972, students at the newly desegregated Escambia High School in Pensacola had a bloody race riot after black students fought the school's band and other white students when the band played the school song, "Dixie," at a football game. After a larger riot in 1974, the school's mascot, a Confederate rebel, was subsequently changed to a gator.

During the early 1970s, a group of students and other Pensacolans published the Gulf Coast Fish Cheer, a newspaper that covered the Vietnam War, race relations, youth culture, civil liberties, and other topics. The paper was a part of the political wave of the period dubbed the New Left.

Since the late twentieth century, there has been dramatic growth in the beach-based tourism industry and rapid development of previously pristine wilderness beaches, particularly those around Panama City, Fort Walton Beach and Destin, Florida. The region attracted mostly people native to Florida and the South. People from the Northern United States, notably retirees, and immigrants from the Caribbean, Central and South America have begun to widely settle the area in the 21st century. Recently development has become rapid, despite periodic hurricane damage.

Many barrier island areas have been redeveloped for condos and houses, increasing the risk of storm damage, as the islands always shift. Other areas remain undeveloped, and the Gulf Islands National Seashore is protected as a park.

Tourism, based on a working-class Southerners from nearby Alabama and Georgia, led many to call the region the "Redneck Riviera." Upscale locals in Pensacola, and surrounding areas disapproved of expanded tourism, citing problems of increased traffic, demands on public services and infrastructure, and higher property taxes. They talked of preserving the "Emerald Coast."

== Timeline ==
=== Prior to 20th century ===
- 1698 - Pensacola established by the Spanish.
- 1781 - St. Michael's Roman Catholic Church founded.
- 1805 - Lavalle House built.
- 1821
  - Floridian newspaper begins publication.
  - First Methodist Church founded.
- 1822 - Legislative Council of the Territory of Florida convenes.
- 1824
  - Pensacola incorporated.
  - U.S. Territory of Florida capital relocated from Pensacola to Tallahassee.
- 1825 - Pensacola Navy Yard built.
- 1834
  - Christ Church built.
  - U.S. Fort Pickens built on nearby Santa Rosa Island.
- 1839 - U.S. Fort Barrancas active.
- 1847 - John the Baptist Church built in Hawkshaw.
- 1848 - Hulse house built.
- 1850 - Population: 2,164.
- 1861 - Battle of Pensacola (1861) fought during the American Civil War.
- 1870 - Pensacola and Fort Barrancas Railroad begins operating.
- 1871 - Dorr House built.
- 1878 - Saint Michael's Creole Benevolent Association formed.
- 1880
  - Palafox Street fire of 1880.
  - Mount Zion Baptist Church founded.
- 1882 - Pensacola and Atlantic Railroad begins operating.
- 1888 - St. Michael's Catholic Church built.
- 1898 - Pensacola Journal newspaper begins publication.
- 1900 - Population: 17,747.

=== 20th century ===
- 1902 - New Christ Church built.
- 1905
  - Great Halloween Night Fire.
  - Pensacola High School established.
  - Population: 21,505.
- 1907 - City Hall built.
- 1908
  - April: Pensacola streetcar strike of 1908 begins.
  - July: Leander Shaw is Lynched.
- 1910 - San Carlos Hotel in business.
- 1913 - Louisville and Nashville Passenger Station and Express Building constructed.
- 1914 - U.S. military Pensacola Naval Air Station begins operating.
- 1915
  - November 5: Military aircraft catapult test-launched from USS North Carolina in Pensacola Bay.
  - Sacred Heart Hospital opens.
  - Rotary Club formed.
- 1916 - October 18: Hurricane hits Pensacola.
- 1924 - Pensacola News Journal newspaper in publication.
- 1925 - Saenger Theatre in business.
- 1926
  - September: 1926 Miami hurricane occurs.
  - WCOA (AM) radio begins broadcasting.
- 1929 - Pensacola Federation of Colored Women's Clubs organized.
- 1930s - Lillie Anna James school established.
- 1931 - Pensacola Bay Bridge opens.
- 1933
  - Pensacola Historical Society formed.
  - Temple Beth-El synagogue rebuilt.
- 1940 - Population: 37,449.
- 1948 - Pensacola Junior College established.
- 1949 - Booker T. Washington Junior College established.
- 1952 - December 14: Snowfall occurs.
- 1953
  - Trader Jon's opens.
  - WEAR-TV (television) begins broadcasting.
  - Palm Drive-In cinema in business.
- 1958 - Escambia High School opens.
- 1960 - Escambia Sun-Press newspaper in publication.
- 1962 - National Naval Aviation Museum established.
- 1964
  - University of West Florida opens.
  - Flora-Bama Lounge and Package in business near city.
- 1967
  - WSRE television begins broadcasting.
  - Historic Pensacola Preservation Board formed.
- 1970 - Population: 59,507.
- 1975 - Roman Catholic Diocese of Pensacola–Tallahassee established.
- 1976
  - February 5: Escambia High School riot occurs.
  - February 26: Racial unrest.
- 1978 - National Airlines Flight 193 crashed into Escambia Bay near Pensacola.
- 1986 - Pensacola City Hall rebuilt.
- 1991 - Civil War Soldiers' Museum established.
- 1993 - March 10: Murder of David Gunn.
- 1994 - Joe Scarborough elected Representative for Florida's 1st Congressional District
- 1998 - City website online (approximate date).

=== 21st century ===
- 2000–2003 - Operation Sandshaker takes place in the Pensacola area.
- 2001 - Jeff Miller becomes U.S. representative for Florida's 1st congressional district.
- 2003 - Trader Jon's closes.
- 2004 - September: Hurricane Ivan occurs.
- 2005 - August: Hurricane Katrina occurs.
- 2009 - July: Murders of Byrd and Melanie Billings occurs.
- 2010
  - Pensacola State College (PSC) active.
  - Population: 51,923.
- 2011 - Ashton Hayward becomes mayor.
- 2015 - Population: 52,752 (estimate).
- 2016 - Palafox Historic Business District is placed on the National Register of Historic Places.
- 2017 - Matt Gaetz becomes U.S. representative for Florida's 1st congressional district.
- 2019 - Naval Air Station Pensacola shooting occurs.

== See also ==
- List of mayors of Pensacola, Florida
- National Register of Historic Places listings in Escambia County, Florida
- Timelines of other cities in the North Florida area of Florida: Gainesville, Jacksonville, Tallahassee

== Bibliography ==
- Richards, John R., ed. (1886). "Pensacola". Florida State Gazetteer and Business Directory. New York: South Publishing Company. OCLC 12186532.
- Waring, George E. Jr., ed. (1887), "Florida: Pensacola", Report on the Social Statistics of Cities: Southern and the Western States, Washington DC: Government Printing Office, pp. 185–190
- Pensacola Directory. R. L. Polk & Co. 1905.
  - 1908 ed.
  - 1916 ed.
  - 1921 ed.
- "Pensacola". Florida Gazetteer and Business Directory 1907-1908. R. L. Polk & Co. 1907.
  - 1918 ed.
- Federal Writers' Project (1939). "Pensacola". Florida: a Guide to the Southernmost State. American Guide Series. New York: Oxford University Press. pp. 235+. ISBN 9781623760090 – via Google Books.
- Davis, Horance G. Jr. (1959). "Pensacola Newspapers, 1821-1900". Florida Historical Quarterly. 37 (3/4): 418–445. JSTOR 30166297.
- Pensacola City Planning Department (1963), Existing Land Use Study, Pensacola, Florida, archived from the original on 2017-04-28 – via University of North Florida
- Eisterhold, John A. "Lumber and Trade in Pensacola and West Florida: 1800-1860," Florida Historical Quarterly (1973) 51#3 pp 267–280.
- Pearce, George F. "Pensacola Naval Air Station 1914-1986," Pensacola History Illustrated (1986) 2#1 pp 2–9.
- Rea, Robert R. "Urban Problems and Responses in British Pensacola," Gulf Coast Historical Review (1987) 3#1 pp 43–62.
- Weddle, Robert S. "Kingdoms Face to Face: French Mobile and Spanish Pensacola, 1699-1719," Alabama Review (2002) 55#2 pp 84–95
- Moore, Patrick. "'Redneck Riviera' or 'Emerald Coast?' Using Public History to Identify and Interpret Community Growth Choices in Florida's Panhandle," Gulf South Historical Review (2003) 18#2 pp 60–91.
- Hellmann, Paul T. (2006). "Florida: Pensacola". Historical Gazetteer of the United States. Taylor & Francis. ISBN 978-1-135-94859-7.
- McCarthy, Kevin M. (2007). "Escambia County: Pensacola". African American Sites in Florida. Sarasota: Pineapple Press. pp. 65–70. ISBN 978-1-56164-385-1.
- Denham, James M., "Crime and Punishment in Antebellum Pensacola," Florida Historical Quarterly, 90 (Summer 2011), 13–33.
- Clavin, Matthew J. "Interracialism and Revolution on the Southern Frontier: Pensacola in the Civil War," Journal of Southern History, 80 (Nov. 2014), 791–826.
