= Florida State Museum =

Florida State Museum may refer to:

- Florida Museum of Natural History, Gainesville
- John and Mable Ringling Museum of Art, the Florida state museum of art, Sarasota
- Museum of Florida History, Tallahassee
- Pensacola Museum of History, formerly the T. T. Wentworth Jr. Florida State Museum, Pensacola
