= Leander Shaw =

Leander Shaw may refer to:

- Leander J. Shaw Jr., American jurist who served on the Florida Supreme Court
- Leander Shaw, African-American who was lynched by an angry mob in 1908
