= St. Michael's Cemetery =

St. Michael's Cemetery may refer to:

- St. Michael's Cemetery (Toronto), Ontario, Canada
- St Michael's Cemetery, Sheffield, England
- St. Michael's Cemetery (Queens), New York, United States
- St. Michael's Cemetery (Pensacola), Florida, United States

== See also ==
- St. Michael's Catholic Cemetery, Happy Valley, Hong Kong
- St. Michael's Churchyard (disambiguation)
