= Trader Jon's =

Bar in Pensacola, Florida, US (1953–2003)

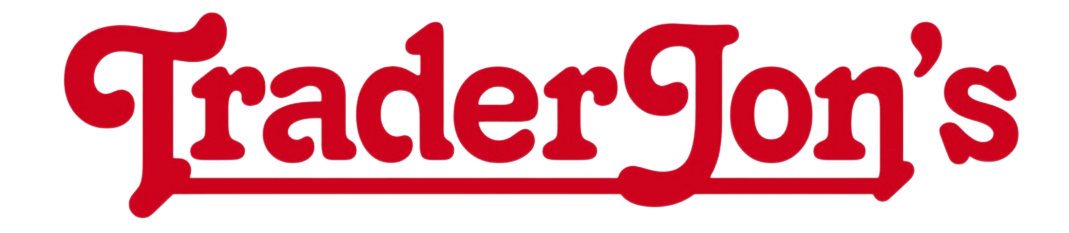

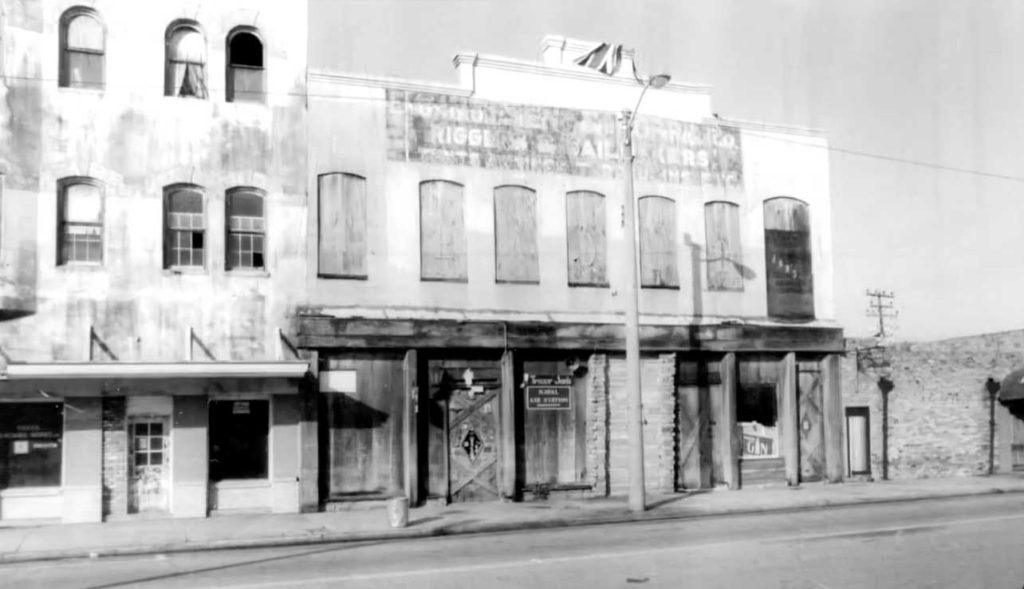
- Trader Jon's in the 1950s
- Interactive map of Trader Jon's

Restaurant information
- Established: January 1, 1953
- Closed: November 9, 2003
- Location: 511 South Palafox Street, Pensacola, Florida, Escambia County, Florida, Florida, United States
- Coordinates: 30.407101°N 87.214197°W

Trader Jon's was a bar in Pensacola, Florida which operated from 1953 to 2003. It became famous for its owner, Martin "Trader Jon" Weissman's personal eccentricities, "Tradernomics", and large collection of military memorabilia primarily focused on Naval Aviation given the nearby presence of NAS Pensacola, NAS Whiting Field, and the former NAS Saufley Field (now NETPDC Saufley), former NAS Ellyson Field (now the civilian Ellyson Industrial Park), and former NAAS Corry Field (now the Corry Station sub-installation of NAS Pensacola).

== History ==
The building that was the location of Trader Jon's was erected in 1896. From the 1890s to the 1950s, it was home to Samuel Charles Shoe and Leather Establishment and Birgar Testman's ship chandlery, as well as being rented out to numerous other businesses.

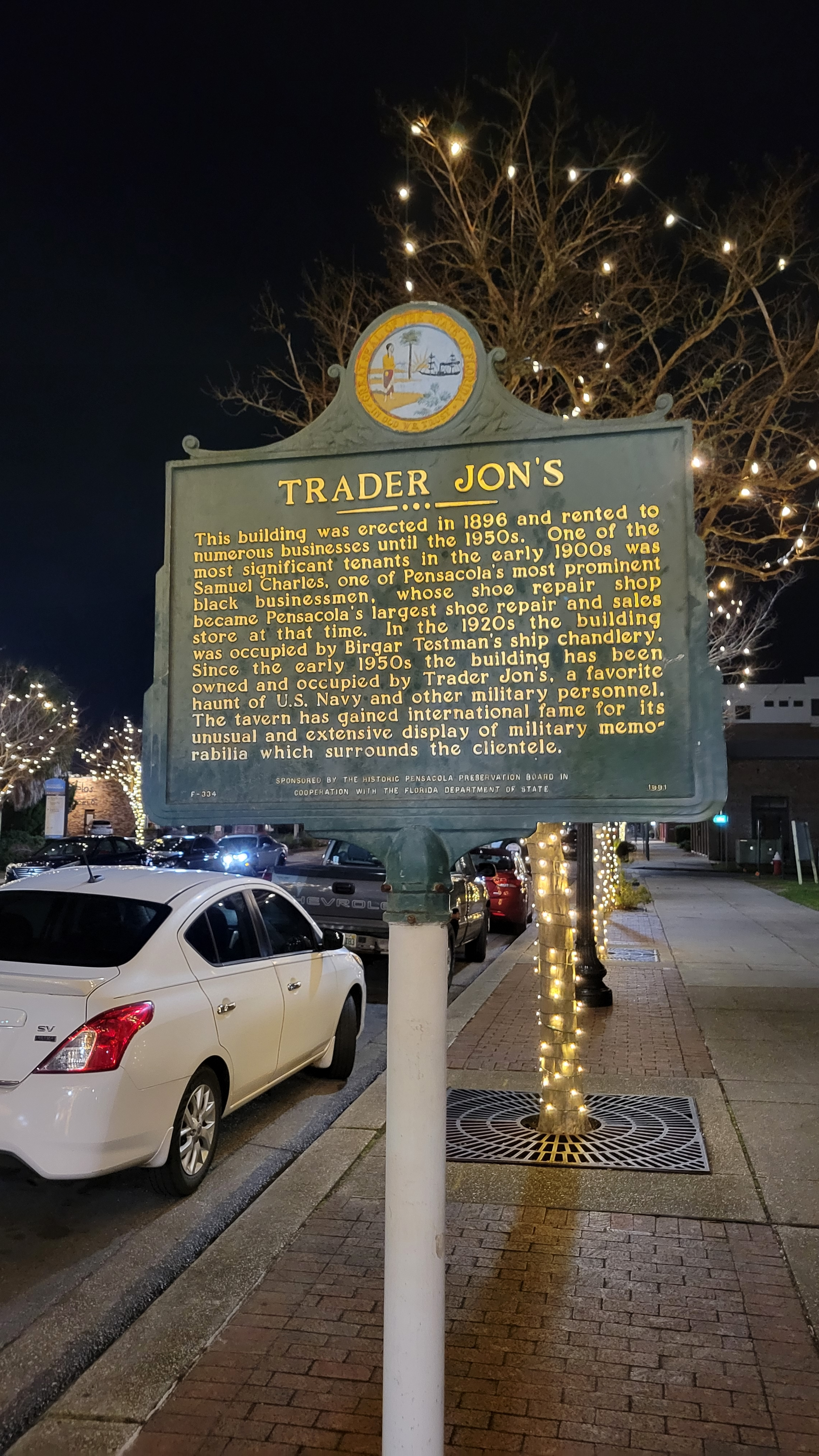
A historical marker in front of the now-5eleven Palafox

On January 1, 1953, Martin Weissman founded Trader Jon's with his wife, Jackie Bond. Before opening the bar, Weissman served in the United States Army, training as a paratrooper during World War II, but being discharged after breaking his ankle before his scheduled deployment to Europe. He later operated bars in Miami and Key West before moving to Pensacola.

Weissman acquired the nickname of "Trader Jon" and he became famous for his habit of wearing mismatched socks with shorts while tending the bar, his personal eccentricities, and a practice which became known as "Tradernomics" in which he would give discounted or free drinks based on his mood and how well he knew the customer. Many celebrities, including John Wayne, Larry King and Prince Andrew, visited the bar. The bar was particularly popular with U.S. Navy, U.S. Marine Corps, and U.S. Coast Guard officer flight students (to include non-commissioned Naval Aviation Candidates, or NAVCADS, in flight training), flight instructors, and senior staff officers at the nearby bases. It also became popular with the members of the U.S. Navy Flight Demonstration Squadron, the Blue Angels, once the squadron became home based at NAS Pensacola, and with college graduate officer candidates and non-college graduate NAVCADs of the Navy's since-disestablished Aviation Officer Candidate School (AOCS) at NAS Pensacola.

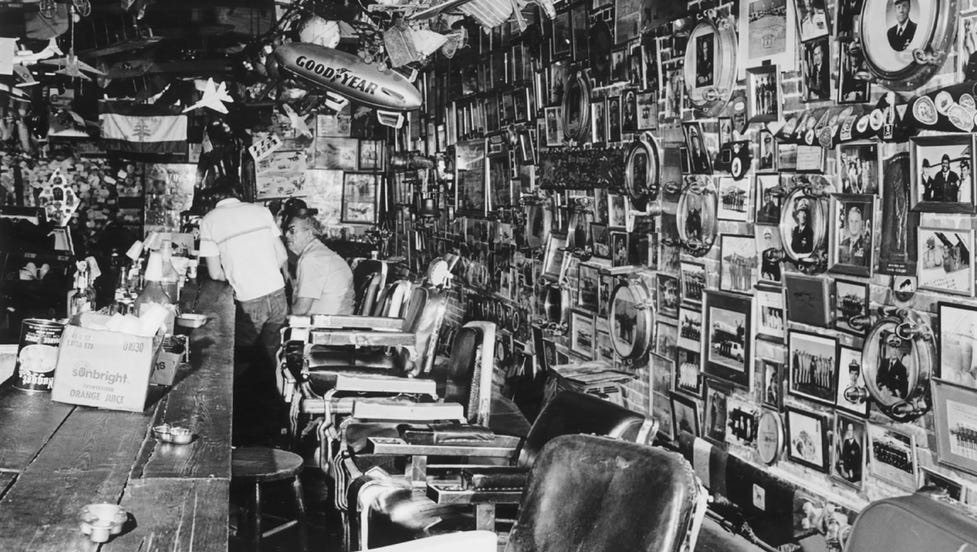
Inside of Trader Jon's

In September 1997, Weissman suffered a stroke that left him partly paralyzed and with impaired speech. Having never fully recovered, he died at the age of 84 on February 18, 2000.

On January 16, 2001, six people were in the bar when customers noticed smoke coming from the Blue Angels Museum room in the bar. Two customers raced over to save as many historical memorabilia items as possible from the fire, and the Pensacola Fire Department stopped the fire before it could spread to the rest of the bar. Trader Jon's officially closed on November 9, 2003.

In October 2016, a new exhibit in the Pensacola Museum of History opened, featuring 15 percent of the estimated 10,000 pieces of military memorabilia that make up the Trader Jon's collection, which is valued at $2,000,000.

== In popular culture ==
- The fictional "TJ's Restaurant" in the 1982 romantic drama film An Officer and a Gentleman is an homage to Trader Jon's.

== See also ==
- List of defunct restaurants of the United States
- Timeline of Pensacola, Florida
