= St. Michael's Churchyard =

St. Michael's Churchyard may refer to:

- St. Michael's Churchyard, Charleston, an Anglican parish church in Charleston, South Carolina
- St. Michael's Churchyard, Mickleham, a church and cemetery in Surrey, England

== See also ==
- St. Michael's Cemetery (disambiguation)
