= José Noriega (Florida politician) =

American politician and brickyard owner

Member of the Pensacola Board of Alderman
- In office 1825–1827

Member of the Legislative Council of the Territory of Florida

First Alcade of Pensacola
- In office 1820–1821

Personal details
- Born: May 31, 1788 Pensacola, Spanish West Florida
- Died: July 10, 1827 (aged 39) Pensacola, Florida
- Resting place: St. Michael's Cemetery
- Spouse: Amelia Christin (m. 1816)

José Noriega Jr. (May 31, 1788 – July 10, 1827) was a Spanish-American politician and brickyard owner who served as the first alcalde of Pensacola from 1820 to 1821. He later served in the Florida Territorial Council and in the Pensacola Board of Alderman.

== Career ==
José was born to Lt. Col. José Noriega and Victoire le Sassier in Pensacola on May 31, 1788. His father was a high-ranking officer in the Spanish army who served under Bernardo de Gálvez during the Battle of Pensacola. After the battle, Noriega and his wife settled in the city. He was the namesake for Norriego Point in Destin. Noriega served in the Louisiana Infantry Regiment and retired from active duty by 1818. After retirement, he served as a volunteer soldier on multiple occasions. He eventually became the owner of an extensive brickyard in Escambia Bay.

After the restoration of the Spanish Constitution of 1812, the position of alcalde of Pensacola was established by Governor José María Callava. An election was held on June 15, 1820, and Noriega was elected to the office. Controversy almost immediately arose when Noriega requested Pensacola's public records from Callava, but the governor refused. The dispute was never solved, as Andrew Jackson took West Florida only a year into Noriega's term, ousting the alcalde and replacing him with George Bowie. He later served in the Legislative Council of the Territory of Florida and as an alderman on the Board of Aldermen of Pensacola from 1825 to 1827.

== Personal life ==
Noriega married Amelia Christin (his first cousin) at Parish of St. Michael the Archangel in Pensacola in 1816. He died on July 10, 1827, and is buried in St. Michael's Cemetery.

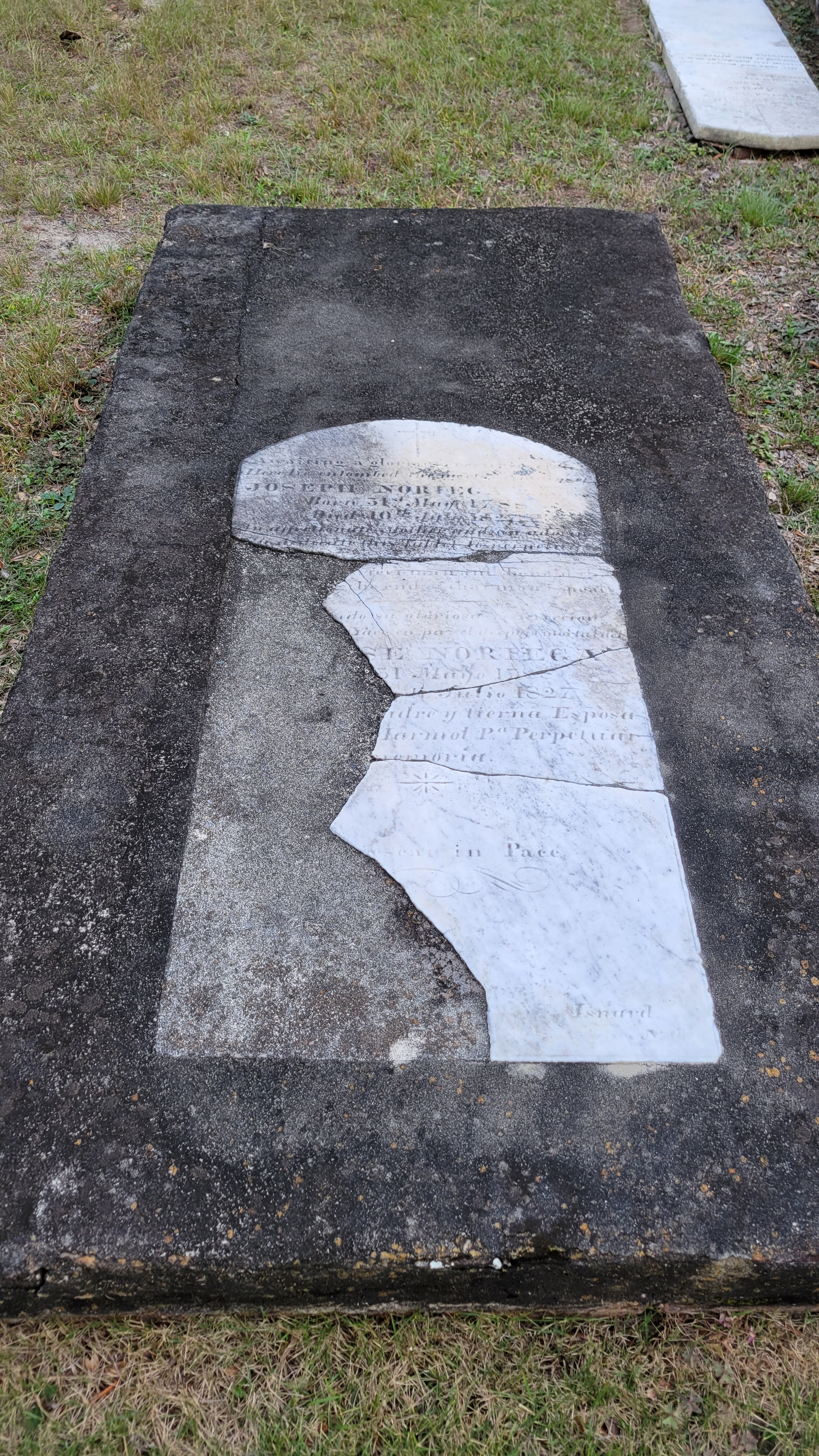
The grave of Noriega in St. Michael's Cemetery
