= St. Michael's Cemetery (Pensacola) =

Historic cemetery in Pensacola, Florida

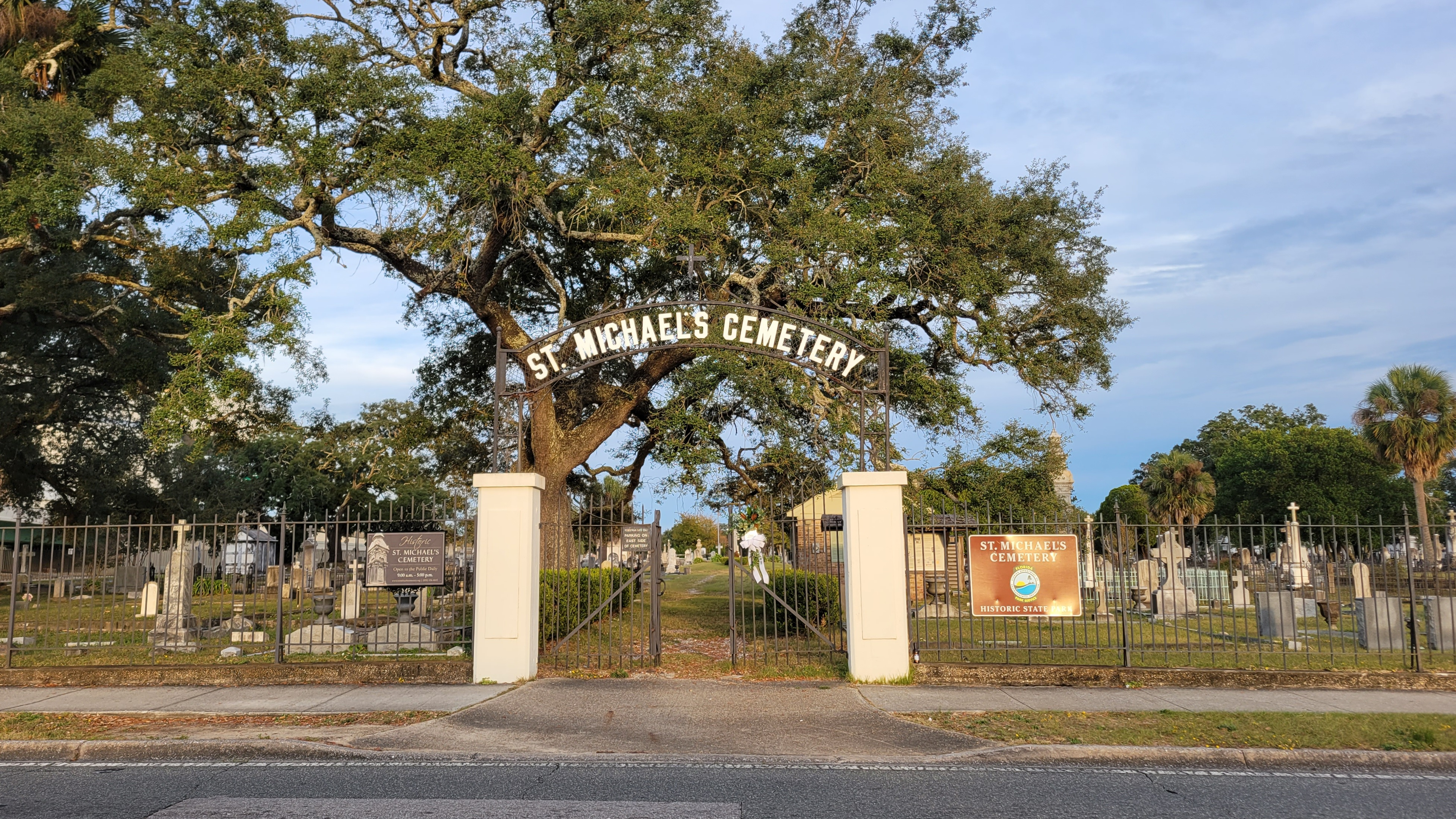

Details
- Established: 1807
- Location: Pensacola, Florida, U.S.
- Country: United States
- Coordinates: 30°24′51″N 87°12′34″W
- Type: Public
- No. of graves: 3,200
- Website: Historic St. Michael's Cemetery

St. Michael's Cemetery is a cemetery in Pensacola, Florida. The land around the current location of the cemetery has been used as a burial ground beginning in the mid to late 18th century, with the earliest above-ground markers associated with Pensacola's Second Spanish Period.

In 1949 the cemetery was dedicated as a state park.

== History ==
The oldest recorded burial ground in Pensacola comes from a 1778 map, showing the ground to be Northeast of St. Michael's in the vicinity of Tarragona and Chase Streets.

After officially being designated a cemetery by King Charles IV of Spain in 1807, it was moved to the south and east, and was formally platted out by Vincente Pintado in 1810. The oldest extant marker of the site dates to 1812.

An 1827 map shows the grounds stretching from Romana Street bordering its north side and Gregory Street at its south, though an 1885 sketch shows the grounds very reminiscent of its current size.

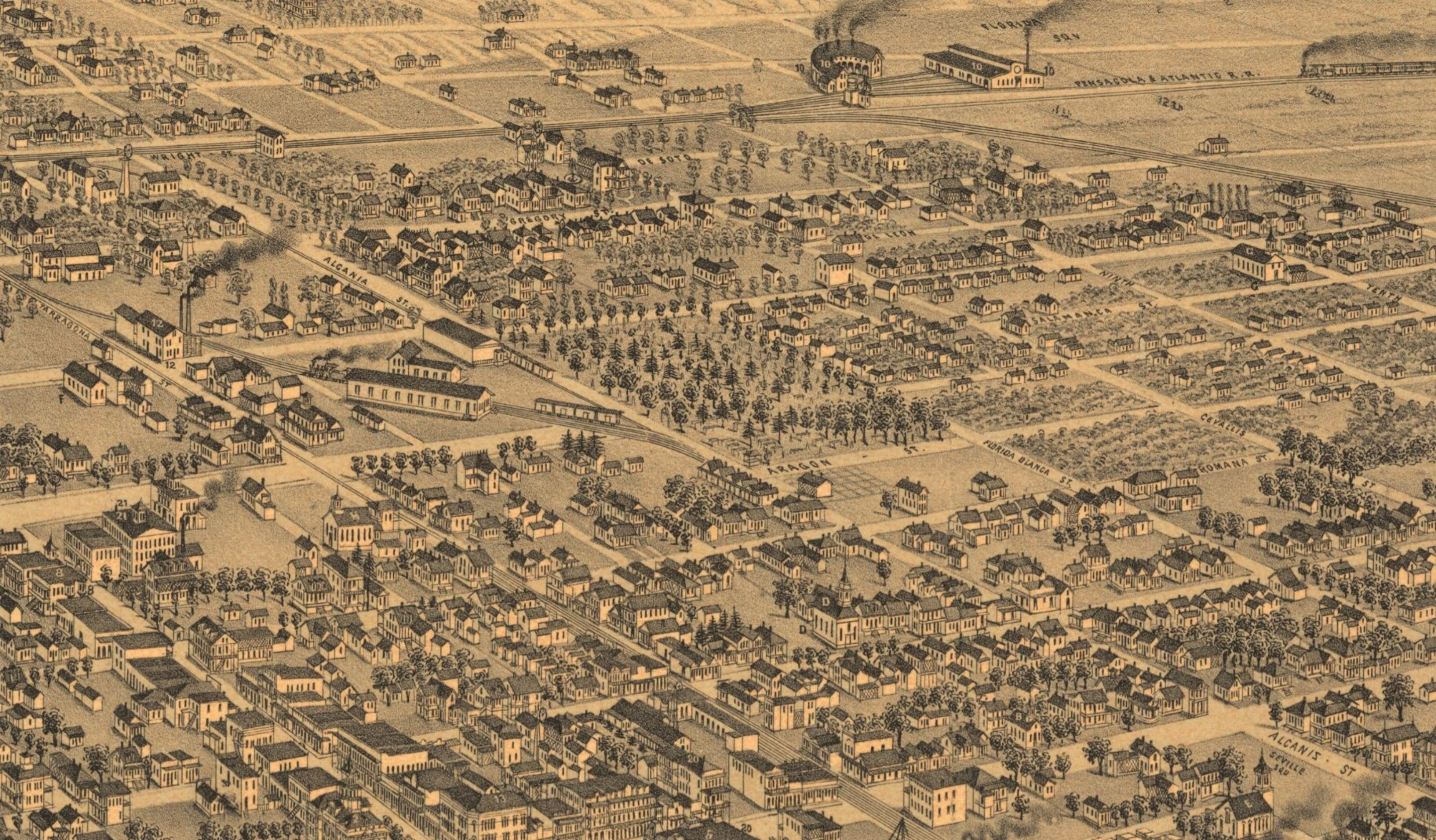
An 1885 sketch of Pensacola, which shows St. Michael's Cemetery (upper center) bordering Alcania Street to its west and Aragon Street to its south
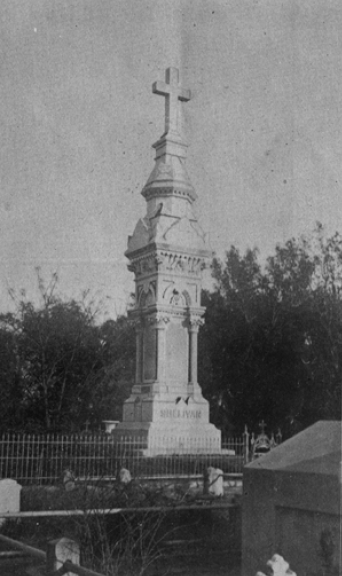
An 1897 photo of the Sullivan monument

Although originally designated for Catholic inhabitants, the cemetery has traditionally served as a burial ground for people of all faiths. As Pensacola has drawn immigrants from around the world, it is the resting place of Captains of Industry, victims of Yellow Fever epidemics and steam ship explosions, along with those who died in child birth, as infants, and of old age.

In 1949 the cemetery was officially dedicated as a state park.

Today the cemetery has about 3,200 marked graves, excluding many unmarked graves, and is primarily maintained by St. Michael's Cemetery Foundation of Pensacola, Inc., a non-profit organization working with the University of West Florida. The cemetery is currently 8 acres (3.2 ha), and is located at 6 N. Alcaniz St.

== Notable burials ==
- Ebenezer Dorr, U.S. Marshall for the western District of the Territory of Florida, first Sheriff of Escambia County
- Manuel Gonzalez, Justice of the Peace and Quartermaster General for the Florida Militia
- Stephen R. Mallory, Confederate States Secretary of the Navy
- José Noriega, first Alcade of Pensacola
- Salvador T. Pons, first black mayor of Pensacola
- Daniel and Martin Sullivan, successful lumber businessman
- Dorothy Walton, wife of George Walton
- P. K. Yonge, businessman and civic leader
