= Lynching of Leander Shaw =

1908 Florida lynching of an African-American

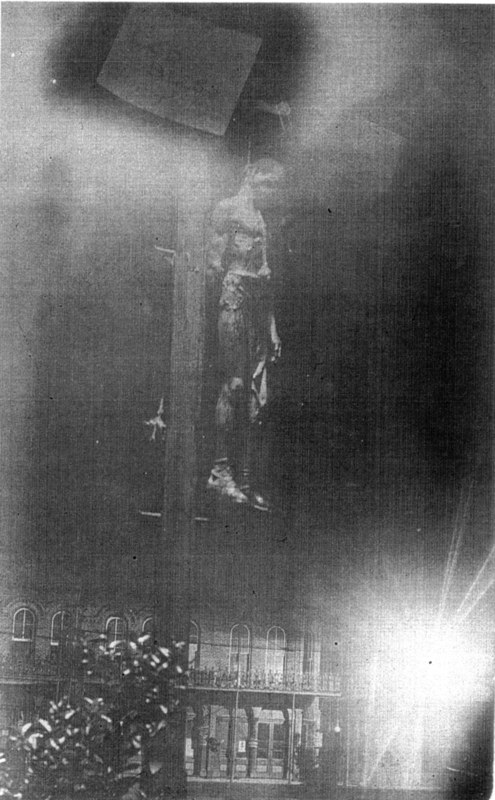
- Leander Shaw hanging from an electric pole in Plaza Ferdinand VII
- Date: July 29, 1908
- Location: Pensacola, Florida

The lynching of Leander Shaw occurred near midnight on July 29, 1908, in Pensacola, Florida. Shaw was accused of the attempted murder and rape of 21-year-old Lillie Davis, who later died from her injuries. Shaw, being positively identified by Davis, was arrested and taken to jail. On the night of July 29, an angry mob shot the Escambia County Sheriff and hanged Leander Shaw in Plaza Ferdinand VII. The police opened fire on the mob, shooting at least 9 people, three of them fatally, but were unable to protect Shaw.

== Assault of Davis and arrest of Shaw ==
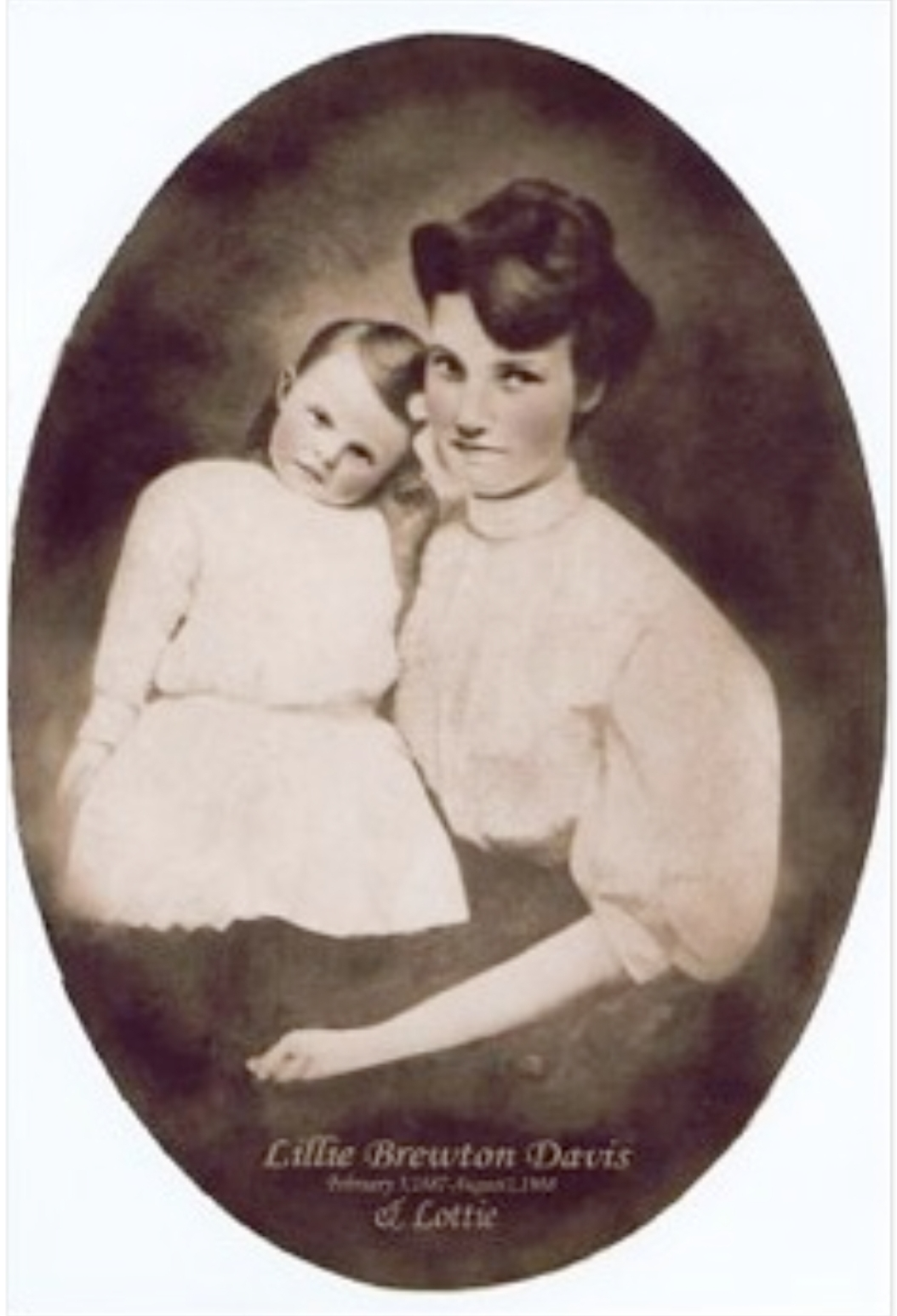
Lillie Davis and her daughter

Earlier on July 29, 1908, 21-year-old Lillie Davis was beaten and found, a victim of assault, in her Gull Point home. Davis' husband was absent at the time; the assailant raped her, slit her throat, beat her in the head with a Colt revolver he had stolen from the home, and then fled. Davis' daughter had also been struck. Davis was taken to a nearby hospital.

Two hours later, a sheriff's deputy arrested Leander Shaw near the bridge over Bayou Texar, "realizing in an instant he had caught the negro brute." The still-bloody knife and stolen revolver were reportedly found in Shaw's possession, who was said to be found washing out a bloody shirt. Shaw was taken to the hospital where Davis was being treated. Davis said Shaw was her attacker. Shaw was taken into custody and was held at the county jail. Lillie Davis died three days later, on August 1.

== Lynching of Shaw ==
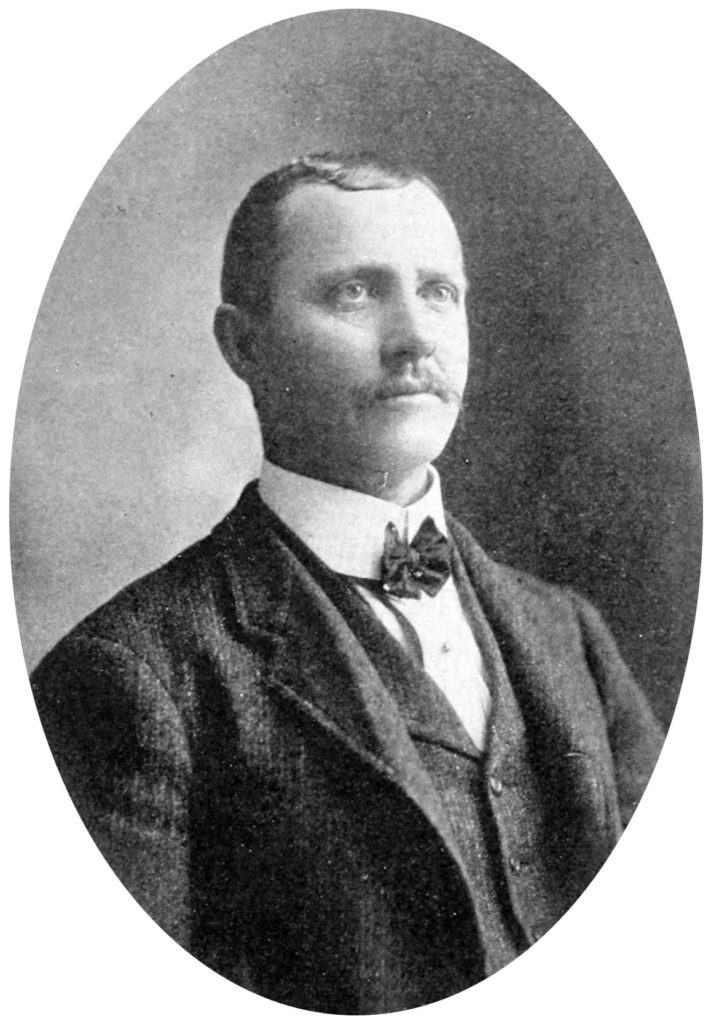
Sheriff James C. Van Pelt in 1904

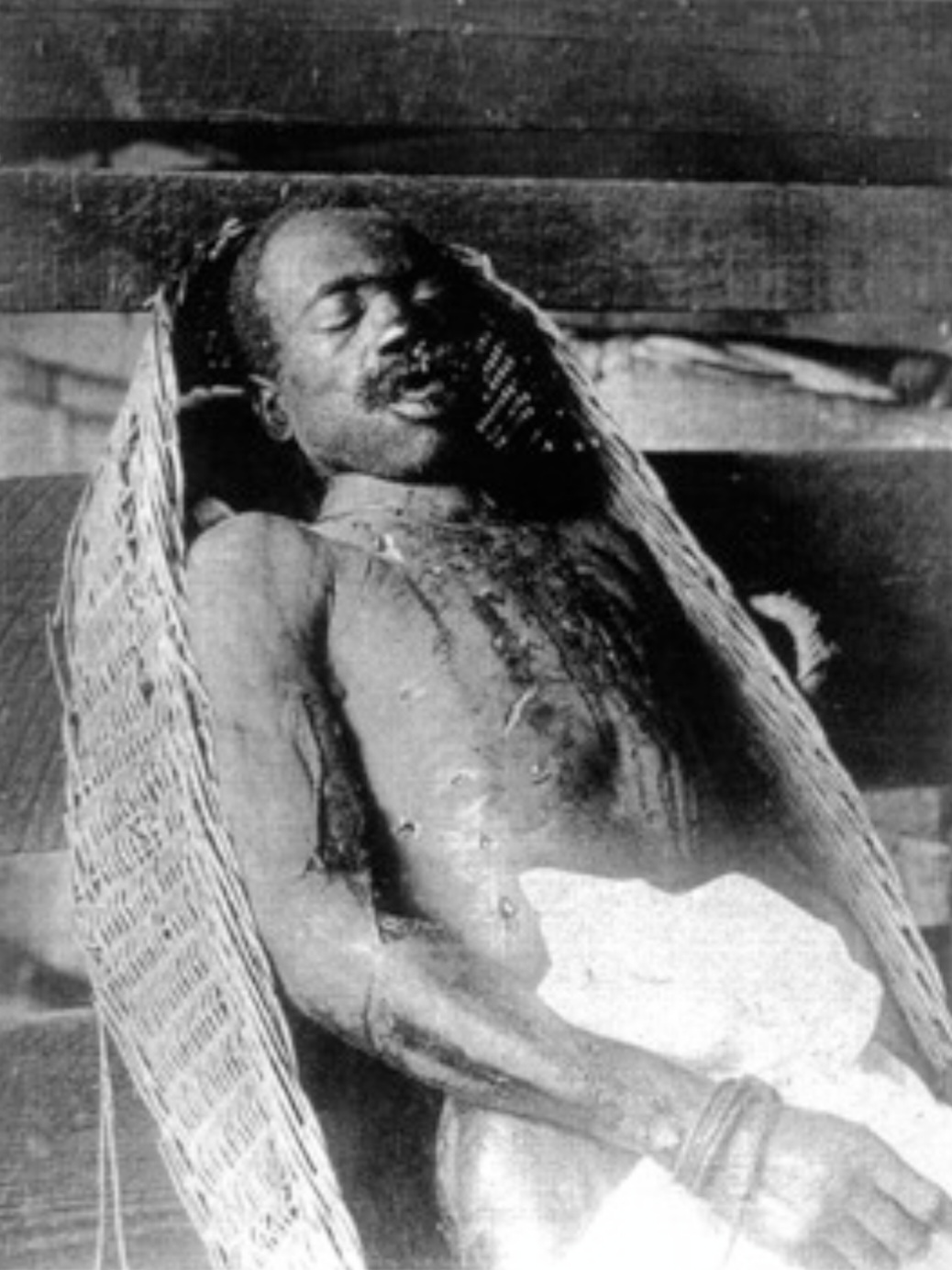
The body of Leander Shaw after the lynching

By 7:00 p.m., a crowd began to form outside of the Escambia County Jail. Sheriff of Escambia County James C. Van Pelt, after unsuccessfully trying to convince the mob to disperse, was quoted by the Pensacola News Journal:

Gentlemen, here I am. You can kill me if you want to, but if you get my prisoner, it will be over my dead body. I have sworn to do my duty, and I am going to do it if I die for it!

At 8:45, the mob stormed the jail, using a section of the streetcar rail to break down the jail yard gate. There was a volley from the second-story windows of the jail building, where several deputies were stationed. Sheriff Van Pelt talked for thirty minutes before he and his deputies opened fire on the mob. A firefight began, with several men on both sides being injured. At least nine members of the mob were shot, of whom two were killed immediately. They were 55-year-old Andrew "Bud" Nichols, who was shot in the head, and streetcar conductor Henry C. Kellum, who was shot in the heart by Sheriff Van Pelt. A.N. "Bud" Knowles, 33, who was shot in the stomach, died from his injuries on August 3, 1908.

At about 11:30, about a dozen members of the mob scaled the rear wall of the jail and entered the backyard. Proceeding quietly, while the officers were busily engaged with the mob in front, the dozen men leaped upon them, kept a number of them on the floor, while others kept deputies at gunpoint. Keys to the jail were taken from Deputy Cusachs. The mob took Shaw, attached a noose to his neck, and dragged him east on Zarragossa Street to Tarragona before taking him to Plaza Ferdinand VII, where the crowd attached the rope to an electric pole, hanged him, and shot his body with more than 500 bullets.

None of the members were charged with murder for the lynching. However, a white man named Ed Ware was arrested for federal postal violations for mailing a postcard depicting Shaw's body.

== See also ==
- History of Pensacola, Florida
- List of lynching victims in the United States
- Timeline of Pensacola, Florida
