= Plaza Ferdinand VII =

- U.S. National Register of Historic Places
- U.S. National Historic Landmark
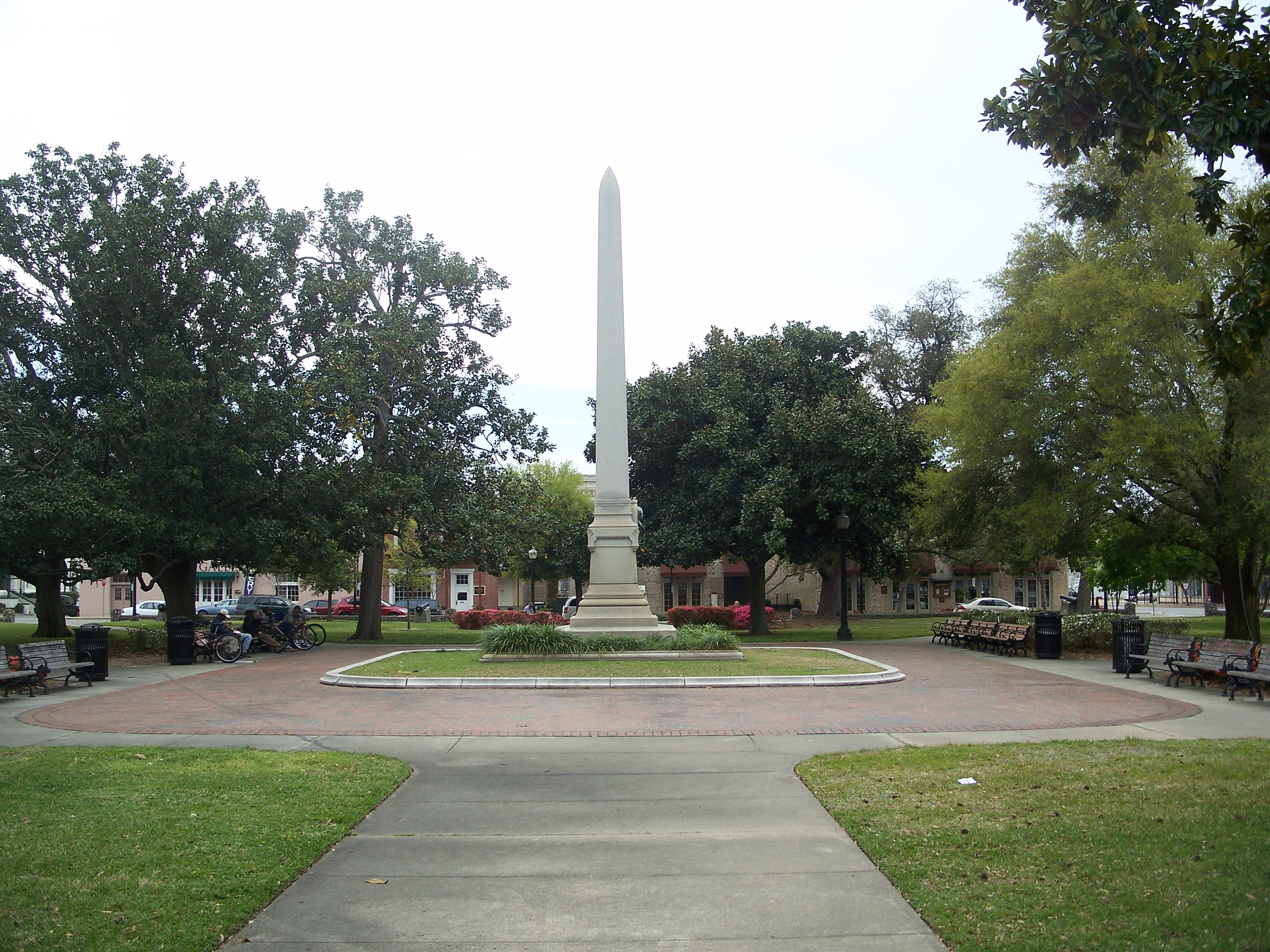
- The plaza, with the Chipley monument in the center

- Location within Florida Location within the United States
- Location: Pensacola, Florida, USA
- Coordinates: 30°24′27″N 87°12′50″W
- Area: 2 acres (0.81 ha)
- NRHP reference No.: 66000264

Significant dates
- Added to NRHP: October 15, 1966
- Designated NHL: October 9, 1960

The Plaza Ferdinand VII is an outdoor garden and park in the Historic Pensacola Village area of downtown Pensacola, Florida. It is located on Palafox Street between Government and Zaragoza Streets. It was named after Ferdinand VII of Spain, the King of Spain between 1813 and 1833. A National Historic Landmark, it is the site of the formal transfer of Florida to United States jurisdiction in 1821.

== Background ==
Plaza Ferdinand VII is bounded on the north by Government Street, the east by Jefferson Street, the south by Zarragossa Street, and the west by Palafox Street. About 2 acres (0.81 ha) in size, it is a grassy area, dotted with trees, and criss-crossed by paved walkways. It has three principal features: a fountain near the northern end, an obelisk at the center, and a memorial to Andrew Jackson near the southern end. The central obelisk is a memorial to railroad baron and mayor of Pensacola (1887–1888)William Dudley Chipley.

The plaza forms part of a street plan laid out in 1765, when Pensacola was the capital of the British colony of West Florida. Originally the central park of that plan was somewhat larger, but significant portions were subdivided and sold off in 1802, when West Florida was again a Spanish colony.

== Historical significance ==
Under the Adams–Onís Treaty, negotiated in 1819, Spain agreed to cede Florida to the United States. Spain did not formally ratify the treaty until 1821. In March of that year, Andrew Jackson was appointed its first territorial governor, and was given the task of overseeing the transfer of the territories of East and West Florida from Spanish authorities. A formal ceremony was held in St. Augustine on July 10, in which the chief United States representative was Jackson's deputy, Robert Butler. Jackson attended the ceremony held on this plaza on July 21, in which the Spanish flag was lowered and the American flag raised. He then made a speech to the townspeople, informing them that the land was now the Florida Territory, and that Pensacola would be its capital. The bust of Jackson now stands at the spot where he was formally inaugurated as territorial governor. The bust was donated in 1935 by the Pensacola Historic Preservation Society.

In 1908, there was the Lynching of Leander Shaw.

The plaza was declared a National Historic Landmark in 1960. As such, it was automatically included in the National Register of Historic Places when that program began in 1966.

In 1989, the plaza was listed in A Guide to Florida's Historic Architecture, published by the University of Florida Press.

Archaeologists, in 2002, discovered evidence of British structures previously not known to have existed in that area.

== New Year's celebration ==
Plaza Ferdinand was the site of the Pelican Drop.

== Notable buildings near the plaza ==
- Saenger Theatre
- Quayside Art Gallery, 17 E. Zarragossa, located in an 1873 firehouse
- Federalist House, 11 E. Zaragoza Street.

== Gallery ==
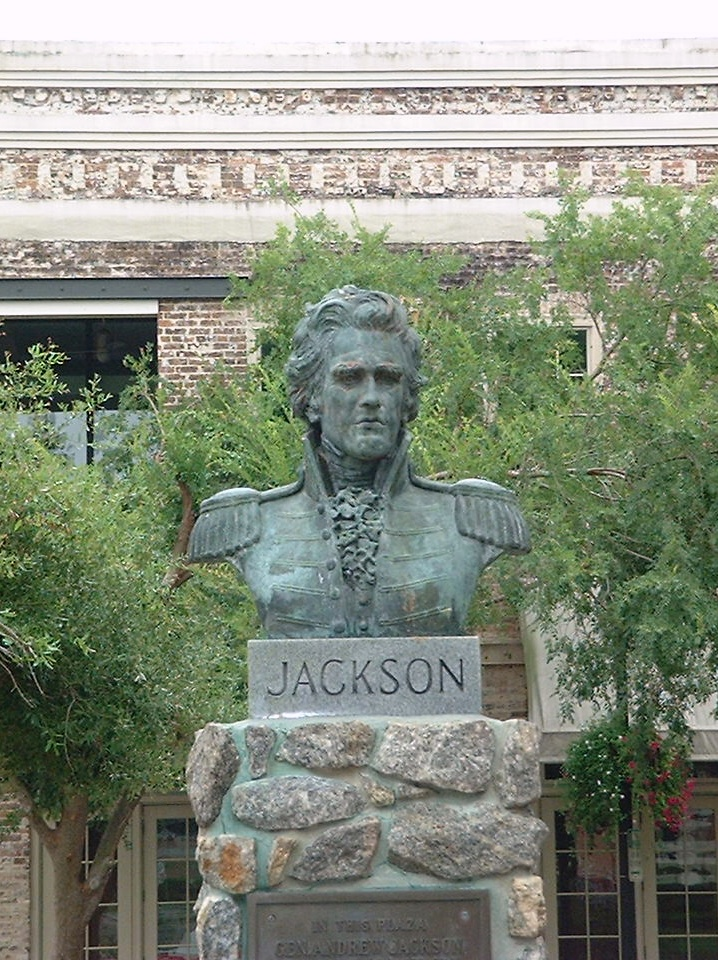
A bust of Andrew Jackson at the Plaza Ferdinand VII, where Jackson was sworn in as governor.

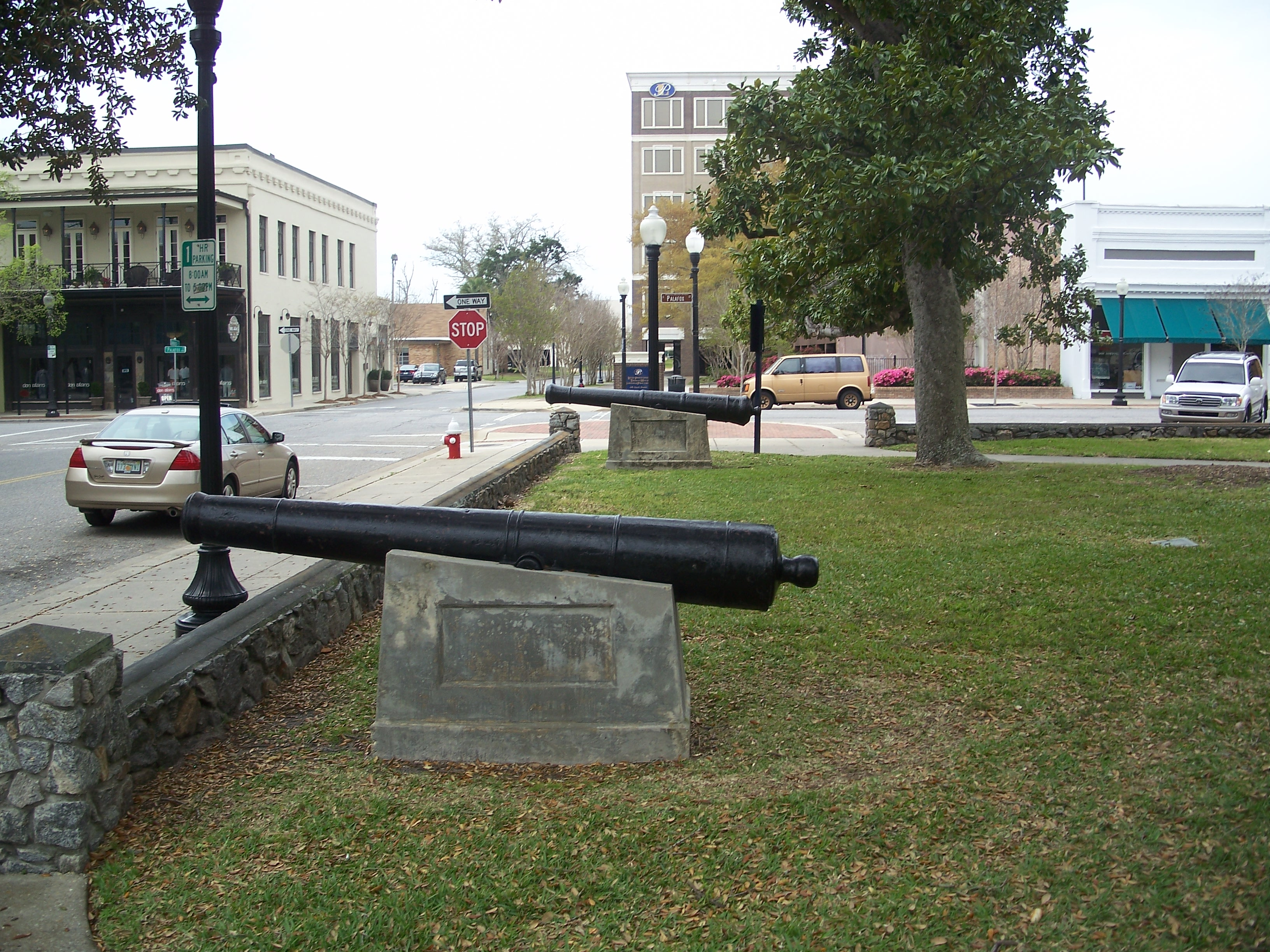
A view of the park's corners

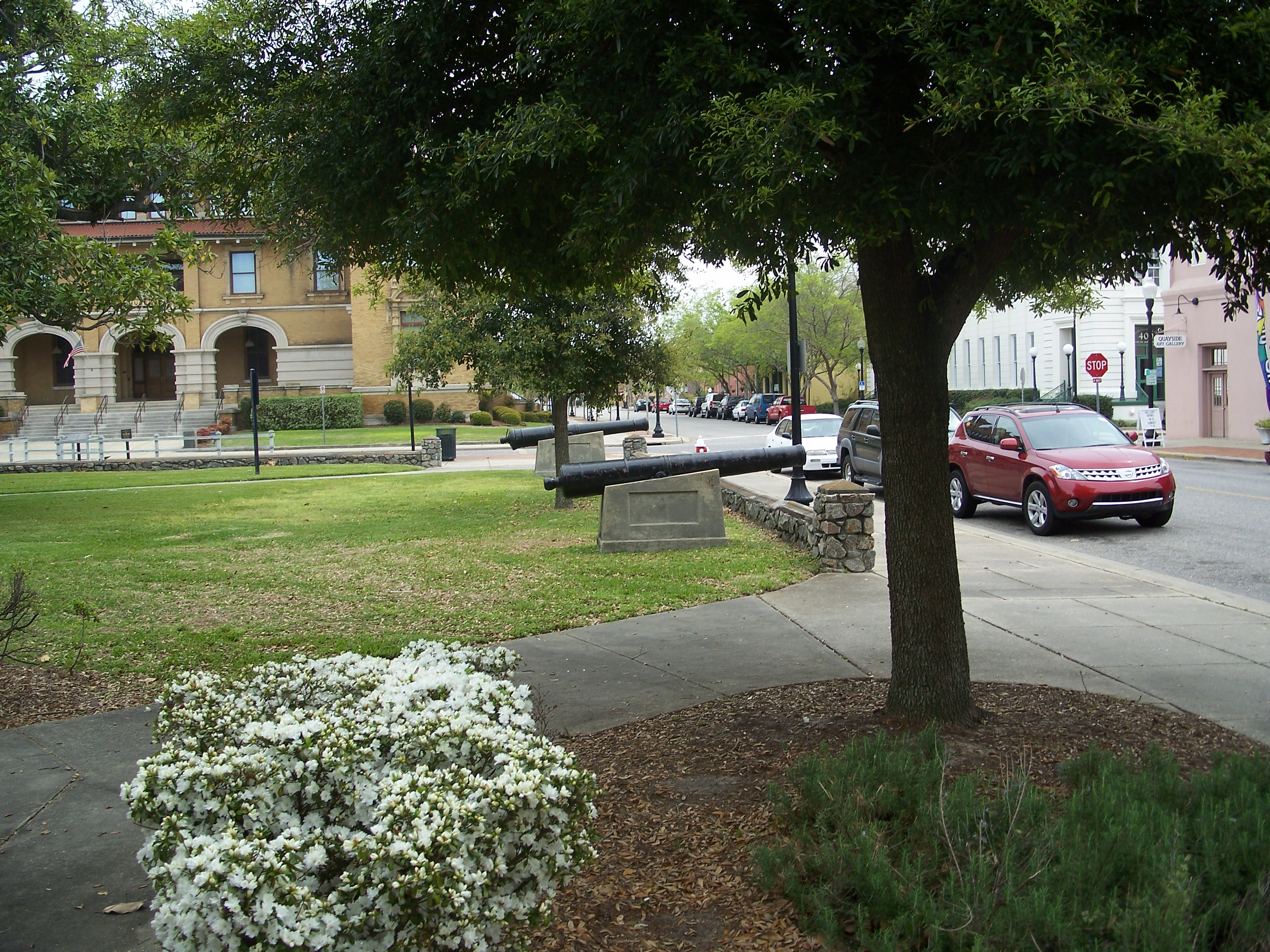
Another view with the Pensacola Museum of History in the background

== See also ==
- List of National Historic Landmarks in Florida
- National Register of Historic Places listings in Escambia County, Florida
