= San Carlos Hotel (Pensacola, Florida) =

Coordinates: 30.4134°N 87.2161°W

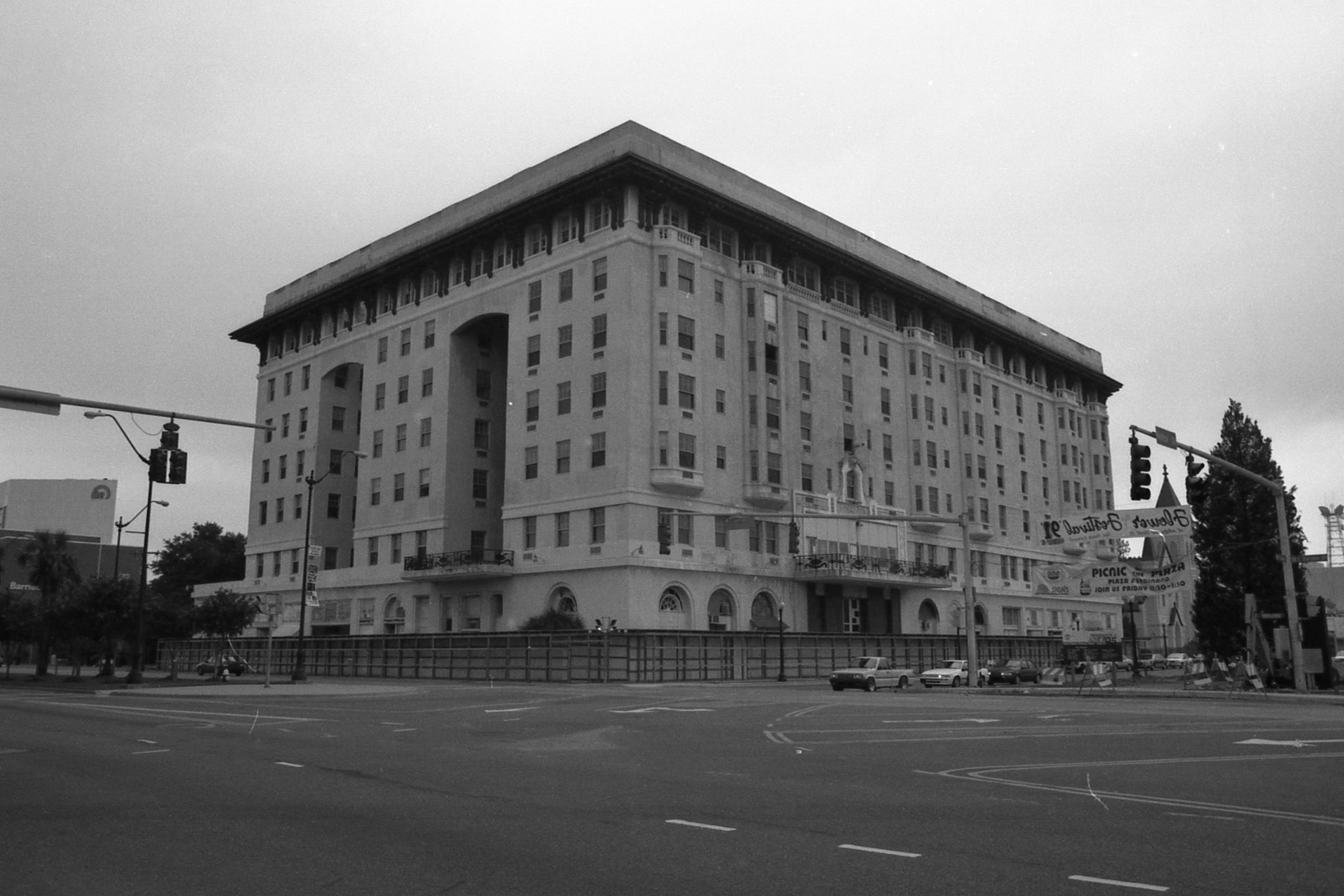
- Site of hotel
- Interactive map of the San Carlos Hotel area

General information
- Architectural style: Mediterranean Revival
- Location: 1 North Palafox Street
- Construction started: April 1909
- Completed: 1910
- Demolished: 1993
- Cost: $500,000
- Client: James Muldon & F.F. Bingham

Technical details
- Size: Seven stories

Design and construction
- Architect: William Lee Stoddart
- Engineer: Charles Hill Turner, Sr. (1868-1945)
- San Carlos Hotel
- Formerly listed on the U.S. National Register of Historic Places
- Location: 1 N. Palafox St., Pensacola, Florida
- Area: less than one acre
- Demolished: 1993
- NRHP reference No.: 82002374

Significant dates
- Added to NRHP: 1982
- Removed from NRHP: February 4, 1994

The San Carlos Hotel, sometimes called the Hotel San Carlos and affectionately dubbed the Gray Lady of Palafox, was a grand and revered hotel in Pensacola, Florida, for much of the 20th century.

The San Carlos Hotel was the project of local businessmen James Michael Muldon, Sr. (1867-1932) and Frasier Franklin Bingham (1872-1953) (lumber magnate and shipbuilder), who saw the need for the kind of upscale hotel being erected in larger cities, and issued stock in the project under the name Pensacola Hotel Company. Regarding the site, their original choice was the northeast corner of Palafox and Garden Streets, which had no significant structures at the time. However, they instead purchased the northwest corner (at the cost of $75,000) from the First Methodist Church, which was relocating to Wright Street. The Methodists had purchased the property from Colonel Chandler Cox Yonge (1818-1889) in 1882 for an old Tarragona Street church building valued at $1,500 plus $100 "to boot."

The hotel was designed by New York architect William Lee Stoddart and erected by local firm C. H. Turner Construction Co. at the cost of $500,000. A sturdy beam-and-girder structural system, designed to withstand hurricane winds, was covered by ceramic tile and stucco. The name "San Carlos" was selected on January 15, 1909, and site clearing began thereafter. As the Pensacola Journal explained:

The name "San Carlos" is typical of Pensacola and of Florida. It suggests at once the romance and chivalry of the early Spanish days and it is distinctive in that there is probably no other hotel of similar name in the United States. Fort San Carlos, the little, ancient Spanish fort at the entrance to Pensacola harbor, and Hotel San Carlos, the magnificent hotel in the center of Pensacola's business section, will help combine to make the city itself one of the greatest tourist resorts of the south.

Ground was broken in April 1909, and construction was completed in 1910. It opened its doors on the first day of Mardi Gras celebrations. The hotel had its own well, with a rooftop cistern and purification system, and the original 157 rooms each had an exterior window and modern furnishings.

Muldon and Bingham leased operation of the hotel to brothers Charles Bedell Hervey (1874-1942) and George Hancock Hervey (1880-1949) of the Hervey Hotel Company (of Mobile, Alabama) until 1919, and then to the Newcomb Hotel Company until 1922, when it was sold to lumber magnate William Byrd Harbeson, Sr. (1861-1934) and managed for 20 years by Harbeson's son-in-law Lee Conner Hagler (1890-1943). The new owners soon announced a massive expansion on the north and west sides of the hotel that maintained a consistent facade and added 246 rooms, a ballroom, a new lobby, and space for offices and shops. New Orleans architect Emile Weil (1878-1945) and associate architect Walker Dorr Willis, Sr. (1882-1968) were responsible for these renovations, with kitchen and food services upgrades completed by the Albert Pick-Barth Companies.

WCOA began broadcasting there in 1932. Artist Joy Postle painted murals in the main lobby and dining room.

The San Carlos Hotel ceased operations in 1982 and lay vacant for more than a decade. A proposal by Baptist Health Care to convert it to retirement apartments failed to materialize. Despite it being added to the National Register of Historic Places, the hotel was demolished in 1993. A new United States Courthouse was built on the site in 1998 (designated the Winston E. Arnow Federal Building in 2010.).

== Images ==
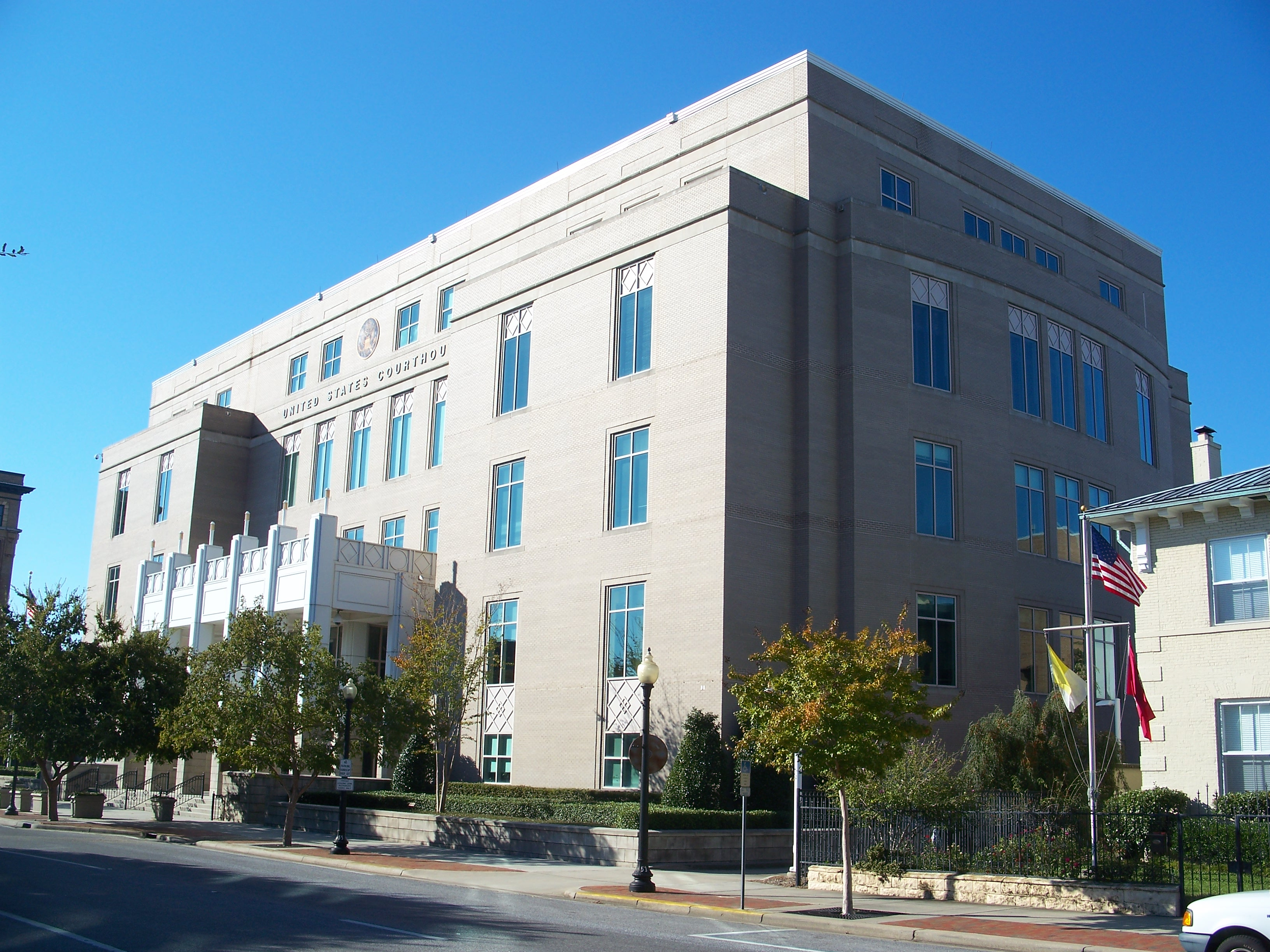
Courthouse built on site of the San Carlos

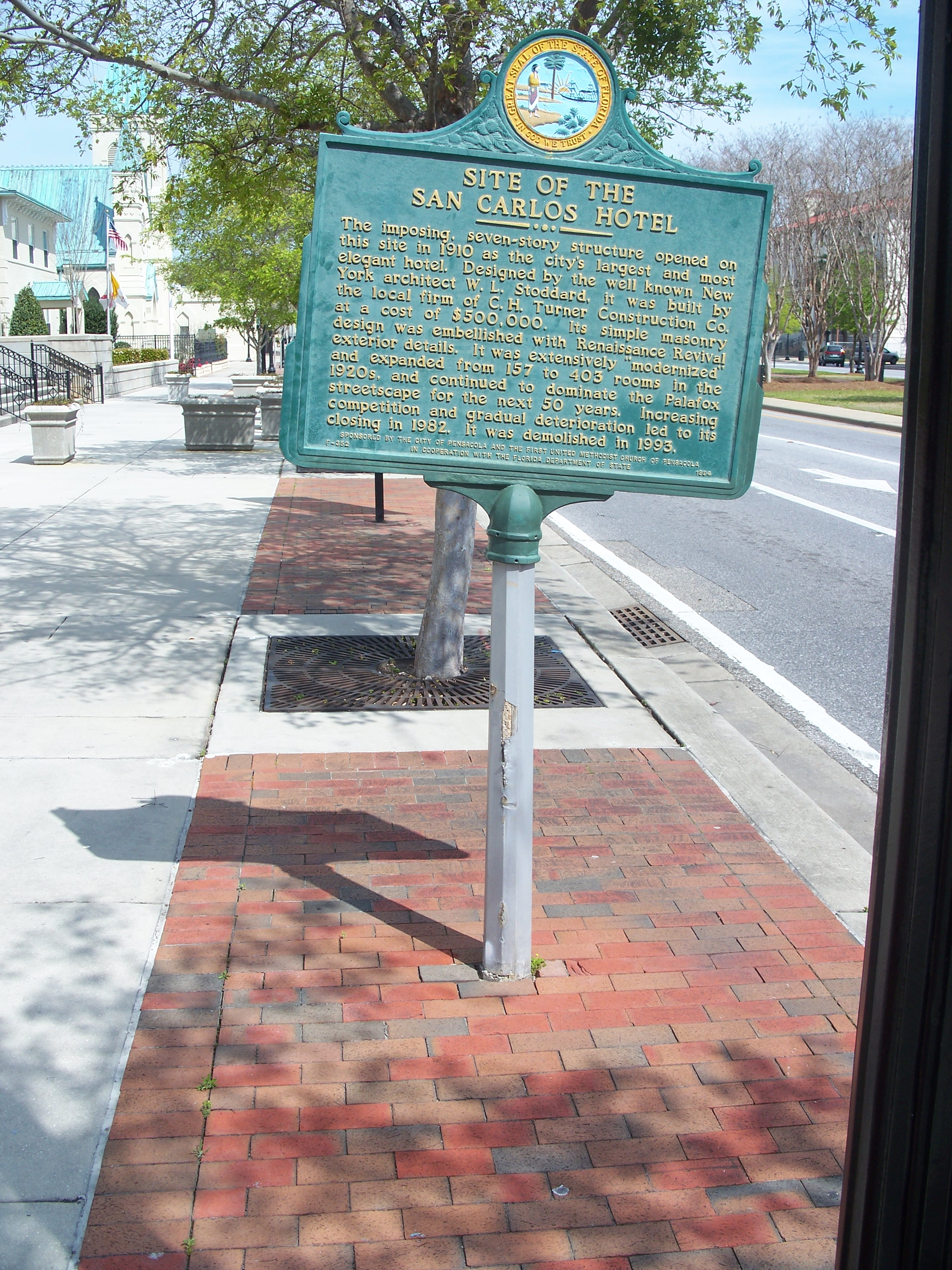
Photo of historical marker
