= Pensacola Museum of History =

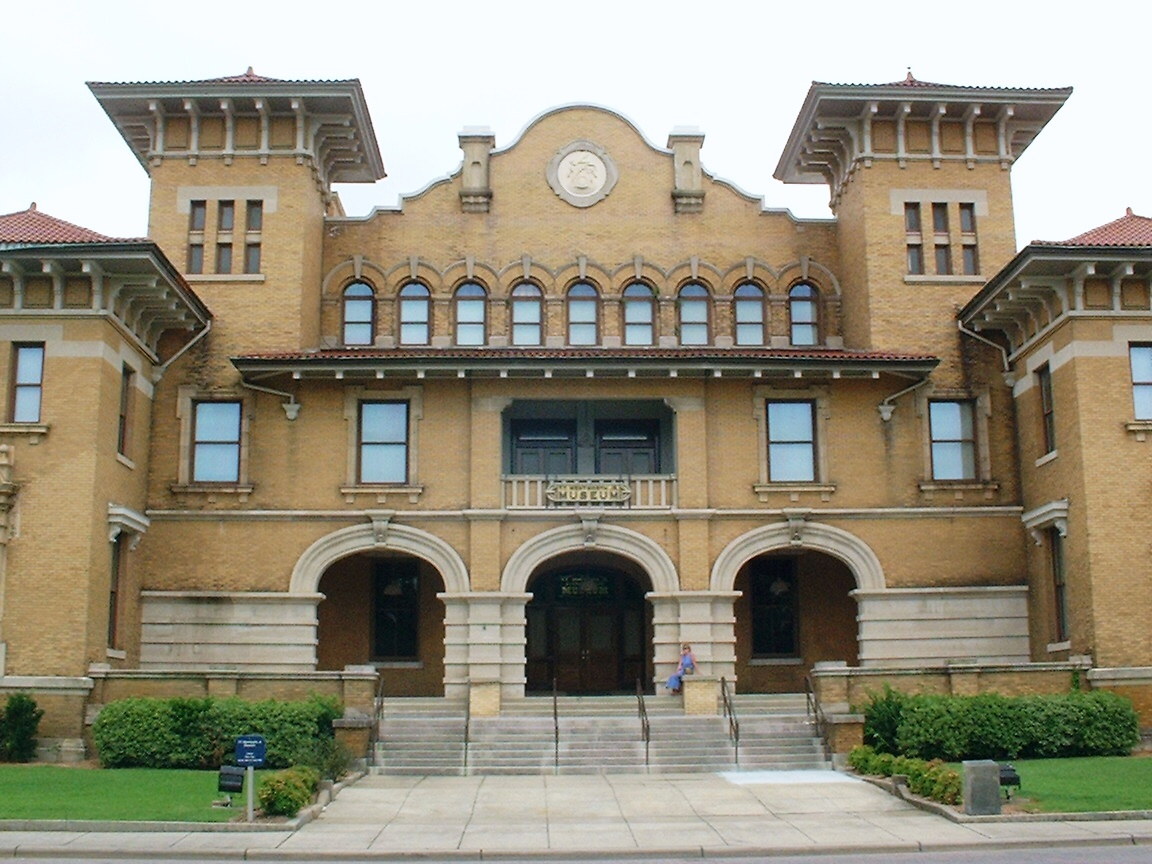

- Location within Florida
- Established: 1988
- Location: Pensacola, Florida
- Coordinates: 30.408781°N 87.21344°W
- Type: History museum
- Website: www.historicpensacola.org

The Pensacola Museum of History at the University of West Florida, formerly the T. T. Wentworth Jr. Florida State Museum, is a museum of history located at 330 Jefferson Street in the Plaza Ferdinand VII in Pensacola, Florida. It is part of the Historic Pensacola Village museum complex. The building, reminiscent of the Alamo mission style, was built in 1907 as the Pensacola City Hall and served as such until 1985 when the present city hall was built at 180 Governmental Center, also known as 222 West Main Street. In 1989, the building was listed as the Pensacola City Hall in A Guide to Florida's Historic Architecture, published by the University of Florida Press.

== History ==
Wentworth opened his first museum as a roadside stand in the suburb of Ensley in 1957, and continued to collect items of interest. His curiosity spanned a wide range of materials. In the 1980s, Wentworth said he would donate his entire collection to the city if it provided a permanent location in Pensacola. A state grant was signed by Governor Bob Martinez to enable the city to renovate the former city hall for this purpose, as the city had completed a new facility in 1985.

The museum was officially opened in 1988. One floor is dedicated to Wentworth's eccentric collections, which include a mummified cat. The other two floors illustrate and interpret life in the Florida Panhandle over the centuries; some of the artifacts are from Wentworth's collection. The other floors house a science interactive museum for children.

From September 2004 to March 2005, the museum was closed for renovations after Hurricane Ivan caused considerable damage to the property. When the museum opened again, a new exhibit was added, comparing and contrasting the effects of the 2004 hurricane to the 1926 hurricane that had damaged the building.

On July 14, 2020 the University of West Florida Historic Trust announced that it was looking into changing the museum's name in light of newly released documents showing that Wentworth was a leader of the local chapter of the Ku Klux Klan. On March 18, 2021, the University of West Florida Board of Trustees voted to change the name of the museum in a 5–4 decision. The UWF Historic Trust board had previously voted in December 2020 to change the name of the museum to the Pensacola Museum of History at the University of West Florida.
