= Pensacola City Hall =

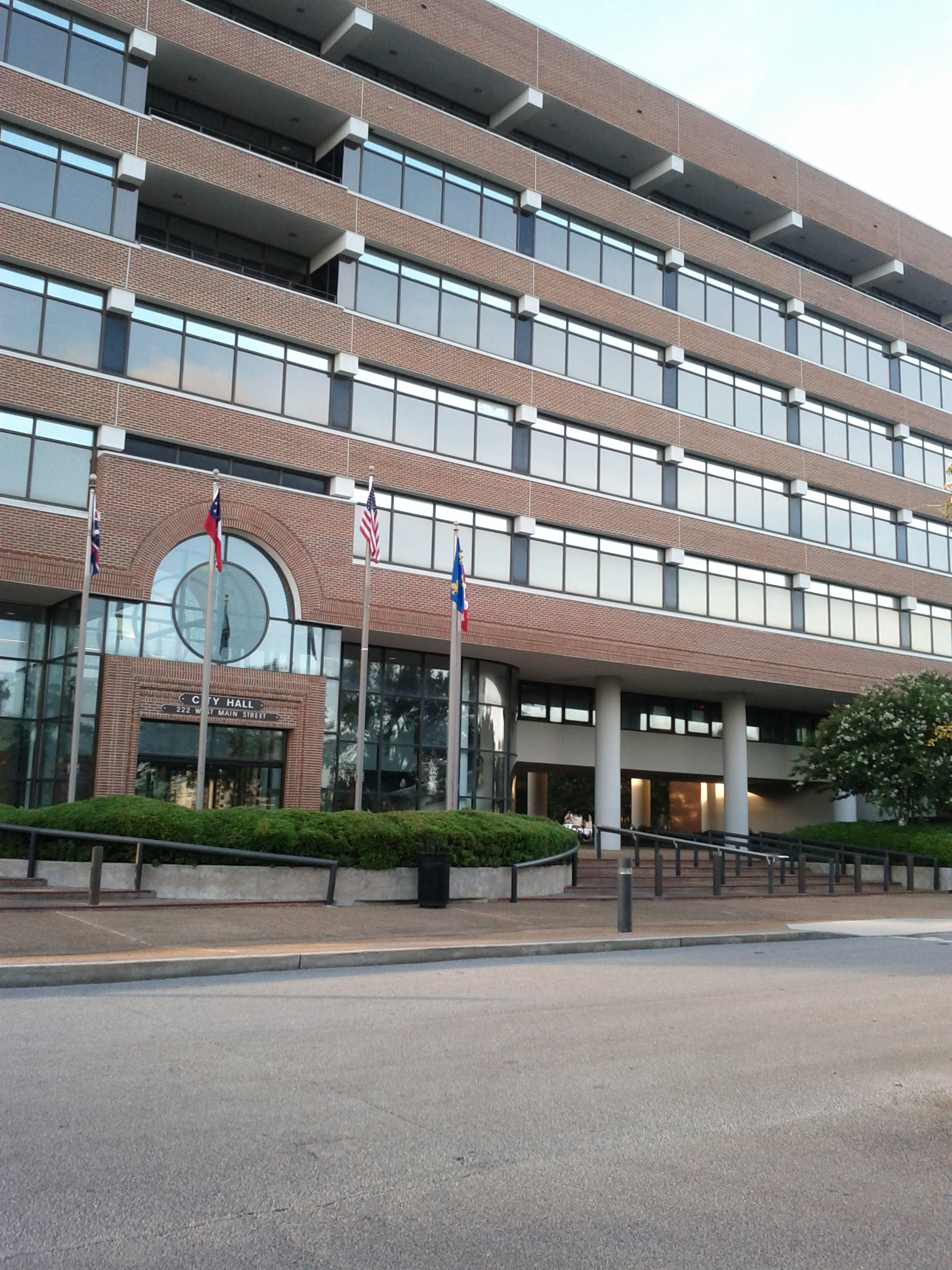
- Interactive map of the Pensacola City Hall area

General information
- Status: Open
- Type: Government Office
- Location: 180 Governmental Center, 222 West Main Street, United States
- Coordinates: 30°24′28″N 87°13′04″W
- Completed: 1986
- Opened: 1986
- Renovated: 2006
- Cost: $6,215,312
- Client: City of Pensacola
- Owner: City of Pensacola

Height
- Roof: 82 ft

Technical details
- Floor count: 7
- Floor area: 93,500 sq ft (8,690 m^{2})

Design and construction
- Structural engineer: GreenHut

Pensacola City Hall is located at 222 West Main Street in Pensacola, Florida, and houses the majority of the offices for the City of Pensacola government. The building faces Pensacola Bay and suffered heavy damage from Hurricane Ivan in 2004, reopening in 2006 after an extensive remodeling process. Meetings of the Pensacola City Council are held in the Council Chambers on the first floor.

== See also ==
Community Maritime Park
