= 2026 Florida Senate election =

- November 3, 2026

20 of the 40 seats in the Florida Senate 21 seats needed for a majority
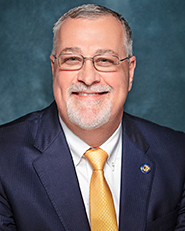

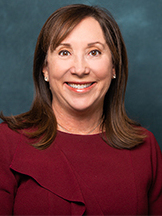
	Majority party	Minority party
Leader	Ben Albritton	Lori Berman (term limited)
Party	Republican	Democratic
Leader since	November 19, 2024	April 24, 2025
Leader's seat	27th - Wauchula	26 - Lantana
Last election	28 seats, 60.83%	12 seats, 38.94%
Seats before	27	12
Seats won	26	13
Seat change	▼1	▲1
Seats up	13	7
	Third party
Party	Independent
Last election	N/A
Seats before	1
Seats up	0
District Results
Democratic
50–60%
60–70%
70–80%
80–90%
90–100%
Republican
40–50%
50–60%
60–70%
70–80%
90–100%
President before election
Ben Albritton
Republican
Elected President
Jim Boyd
Republican

Elections for the Florida Senate in 2026 took place on Tuesday, November 3, 2026, to elect state senators from 20 of 40 districts. The Republican Party has held a Senate majority since 1995.

While Republicans maintained the majority, they had lost their two-thirds supermajority, as Democrats gained one seat break. This is the first time since 2020 they failed had to gain such a majority.

== Term-limited and retiring incumbents ==
=== Republicans ===
- 8th district: Tom Wright
- 22nd district: Joe Gruters
- 28th district: Kathleen Passidomo

=== Democrats ===
- 16th district: Darryl Rouson
- 26th district: Lori Berman
- 30th district: Tina Polsky
- 34th district: Shevrin Jones

== Special elections ==
=== District 11 (special) ===
On July 21, 2025, incumbent Republican Blaise Ingoglia resigned after being appointed Chief Financial Officer of Florida. A special election was held on December 9, 2025.

Republican primary
Party	Candidate	Votes	%
Republican	Ralph Massullo	22,525	79.53
Republican	Anthony Brice	5,799	20.47
Total votes		28,324	100.00

2025 Florida Senate special election, 11th District
Party	Candidate	Votes	%
Republican	Ralph Massullo	49,088	59.22
Democratic	Ash Marwah	33,803	40.78
Total votes		82,891	100.00

=== District 14 (special) ===
14th district special election
- March 24, 2026
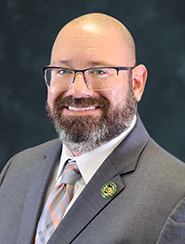

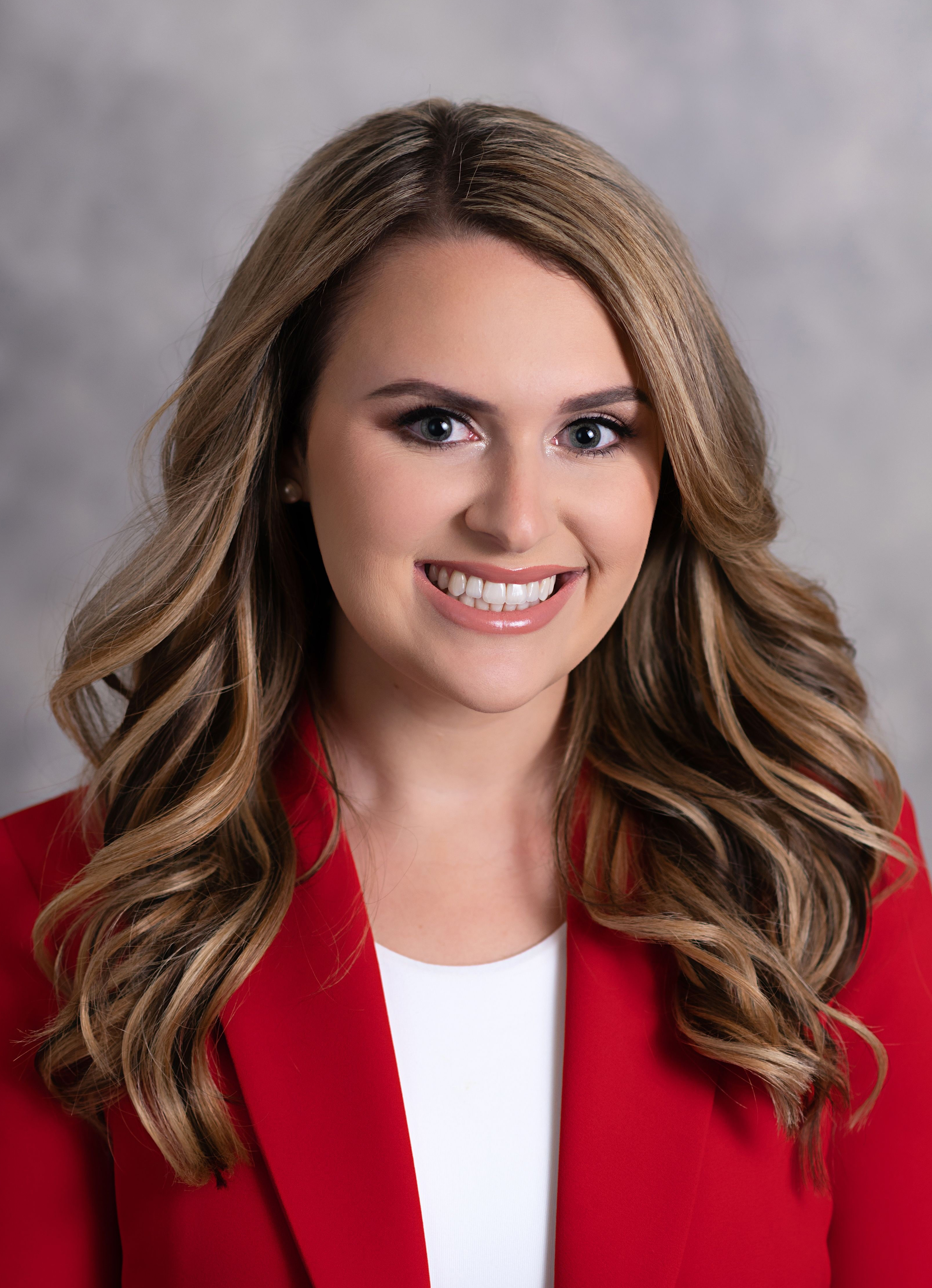
Nominee	Brian Nathan	Josie Tomkow
Party	Democratic	Republican
Popular vote	40,212	39,804
Percentage	50.25%	49.75%
- Precinct results Nathan: 50–60% 60–70% 70–80% 80–90% Tomkow: 50–60% 60–70% 70–80%
Senator before election
Jay Collins
Republican
Elected Senator
Brian Nathan
Democratic

On August 12, 2025, incumbent Republican Jay Collins resigned after being appointed Lieutenant Governor of Florida. A special election was held on March 24, 2026.

2026 Florida Senate special election, 14th District
Party	Candidate	Votes	%
Democratic	Brian Nathan	40,212	50.25
Republican	Josie Tomkow	39,804	49.75
Total votes		80,016	100.00
Democratic gain from Republican			

=== District 15 (special) ===
On February 13, 2025, incumbent Democrat Geraldine Thompson died following complications from knee replacement surgery. A special election was held on September 2, 2025.

Democratic primary
Party	Candidate	Votes	%
Democratic	LaVon Bracy Davis	5,533	42.96
Democratic	Coretta Anthony-Smith	3,646	28.31
Democratic	Alan Grayson	2,153	16.72
Democratic	Randolph Bracy	1,548	12.02
Total votes		12,880	100.00

2025 Florida Senate special election, 15th District
Party	Candidate	Votes	%
Democratic	LaVon Bracy Davis	17,771	72.58
Republican	Willie Montague	6,713	27.42
Total votes		24,484	100.00

=== District 19 (special) ===
On November 26, 2024, incumbent Republican Randy Fine submitted his resignation, effective March 31, 2025, to run for Congress. A special election was held on June 10, 2025.

Republican primary
Party	Candidate	Votes	%
Republican	Debbie Mayfield	23,637	60.81
Republican	Mark Lightner III	6,264	16.12
Republican	Tim Thomas	5,183	13.33
Republican	Marcie Adkins	3,786	9.74
Total votes		38,870	100.00

2025 Florida Senate special election, 19th District
Party	Candidate	Votes	%
Republican	Debbie Mayfield	37,546	54.44
Democratic	Vance Ahrens	31,419	45.56
Total votes		68,965	100.00

=== District 21 (special) ===
On May 13, 2026, incumbent Republican Ed Hooper submitted his resignation, effective November 3, 2026. A special election was held on November 3, coinciding with regularly scheduled Senate elections.

2026 Florida Senate special election, 21st District
Party	Candidate	Votes	%
Republican	Chris Nocco	129,015	57.70
Democratic	Jordan Hensley	94,570	42.30
Total votes		223,585	100.00

== Predictions ==
Source	Ranking	As of
Sabato's Crystal Ball	Likely R	January 22, 2026
State Navigate	Very Likely R	September 09, 2026

== Overview ==
=== Closest races ===
Seats where the margin of victory was under 10%:

1. District 12, 0.66%
2. District 38, 0.83%
3. District 36, 1.18%
4. District 18, 1.76%
5. District 14, 4.5%

== Summary of results ==
Italics denote an open seat held by the incumbent party; bold text denotes a gain for a party.

- Only even-numbered seats will be up for election in 2026.

District	2024 Pres.	Incumbent	Party	Elected Senator	Outcome
2	R+48.6	Jay Trumbull	Rep	Jay Trumbull	Rep Hold
4	R+23.8	Clay Yarborough	Rep	Clay Yarborough	Rep Hold
6	R+27.5	Jennifer Bradley	Rep	Jennifer Bradley	Rep Hold
8	R+22.0	Tom Wright	Rep	Jake Johansson	Rep Hold
10	R+1.6	Jason Brodeur	Rep	**John Lowndes**	**Dem Gain**
12	R+15.6	Colleen Burton	Rep	Colleen Burton	Rep Hold
14	R+7.4	Brian Nathan	Dem	Brian Nathan	Dem Hold
16	D+25.7	Darryl Rouson	Dem	Fentrice Driskell	Dem Hold
18	R+9.6	Nick DiCeglie	Rep	Nick DiCeglie	Rep Hold
20	R+18.9	Jim Boyd	Rep	Jim Boyd	Rep Hold
22	R+18.0	Joe Gruters	Rep	James Buchanan	Rep Hold
24	D+10.1	Mack Bernard	Dem	Mack Bernard	Dem Hold
26	D+5.7	Lori Berman	Dem	David Silvers	Dem Hold
28	R+31.4	Kathleen Passidomo	Rep	Lauren Melo	Rep Hold
30	D+8.5	Tina Polsky	Dem	Lauren Book	Dem Hold
32	D+39.1	Rosalind Osgood	Dem	Rosalind Osgood	Dem Hold
34	D+38.9	Shevrin Jones	Dem	Ashley Gantt	Dem Hold
36	R+15.9	Ileana Garcia	Rep	Ileana Garcia	Rep Hold
38	R+10.1	Alexis Calatayud	Rep	Alexis Calatayud	Rep Hold
40	R+27.2	Ana Maria Rodriguez	Rep	Ana Maria Rodriguez	Rep Hold

== District 2 ==
2026 Florida's 2nd Senate district election
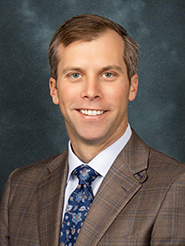

Nominee	Jay Trumbull	Lauren Donahoo
Party	Republican	Democratic
Popular vote	145,305	57,177
Percentage	71.76	28.24
Senator before election
Jay Trumbull
Republican
Elected Senator
Jay Trumbull
Republican

The 2nd district is located in the middle of the Florida panhandle, containing Bay, Calhoun, Holmes, Jackson, Walton, and Washington Counties, and part of Okaloosa County.

The incumbent was Republican Jay Trumbull, who was elected with 78.22% of the vote in 2022.

=== Republican nominee ===
- Jay Trumbull, incumbent state senator

=== Democratic nominee ===
- Lauren Donahoo

=== General election ===
General election results
Party	Candidate	Votes	%
Republican	Jay Trumbull	145,305	71.76
Democratic	Lauren Donahoo	57,177	28.24
Total votes		202,482	100.00
Republican hold			

== District 4 ==
2026 Florida's 4th Senate district election
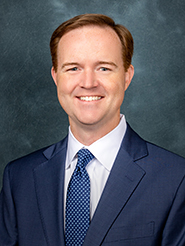
Candidate	Clay Yarborough (Uncontested)
Party	Republican
Senator before election
Clay Yarborough
Republican
Elected Senator
Clay Yarborough
Republican

The 4th district is composed of all of Nassau County and outer Duval County. The incumbent was Republican Clay Yarborough, who was elected with 67.71% of the vote in 2022. As Yarborough ran for re-election unopposed, both the primary and general elections were cancelled.

=== Republican nominee ===
- Clay Yarborough, incumbent state senator

=== Democratic primary ===
==== Candidates ====
===== Did not qualify =====
- Sharmin Turner

=== General election ===
General election results
Party	Candidate	Votes	%
Republican	Clay Yarborough (incumbent)	Unopposed	
Total votes		—	—
Republican hold			

== District 6 ==
2026 Florida's 6th Senate district election
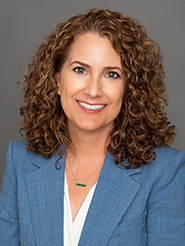

Nominee	Jennifer Bradley	Jason Bellamy-Fults
Party	Republican	Democratic
Popular vote	122,289	85,682
Percentage	58.23	40.80
Senator before election
Jennifer Bradley
Republican
Elected Senator
Jennifer Bradley
Republican

The 6th district is located in North central Florida, and includes Baker, Bradford, Clay, Columbia, Gilchrist and Union Counties, as well as the northern half of Alachua County, including part of Gainesville. The incumbent was Republican Jennifer Bradley, who was re-elected unopposed in 2022.

=== Republican nominee ===
- Jennifer Bradley, incumbent state senator

=== Democratic nominee ===
- Jason Bellamy-Fults, union official

=== American Solidarity nominee ===
- Joseph Thorton

=== General election ===
General election results
Party	Candidate	Votes	%
Republican	Jennifer Bradley	122,289	58.23
Democratic	Jason Bellamy-Fults	85,682	40.80
American Solidarity	Joseph Thorton	2,038	0.97
Total votes		210,009	100.00
Republican hold			

== District 8 ==
2026 Florida's 8th Senate district election

Candidate	Jake Johansson	Judy Ngying
Party	Republican	Democratic
Popular vote	125,107	96,363
Percentage	55.50	42.75
Senator before election
Tom Wright
Republican
Elected Senator
Jake Johansson
Republican

The incumbent is Republican Tom Wright, who was re-elected with 63% of the vote in 2022. Wright is term-limited.

=== Republican primary ===
==== Candidates ====
===== Nominee =====
- Jake Johansson, Volusia County councilman

===== Failed to qualify =====
- Jason Marshall Voelz

===== Withdrew =====
- Heather Louise Bendl (running for state representative)
- Elizabeth Fetterhoff, former state representative (2018–2022)

==== Endorsements ====
Jake Johansson

State legislators

- Ben Albritton, President of the Florida Senate
- Jim Boyd, majority leader of the Florida Senate
- Jay Trumbull, state senator
- Tom Wright, incumbent state senator for this district

Organizations

- Florida Chamber of Commerce

=== Democratic nominee ===
- Judy Ngying, teacher

=== Libertarian nominee ===
- Gabe Wozniak

=== General election ===
General election results
Party	Candidate	Votes	%
Republican	Jake Johansson	125,107	55.50
Democratic	Judy Ngying	96,363	42.75
Libertarian	Gabe Wozniak	3,941	1.75
Total votes		225,411	100.00

== District 10 ==
2026 Florida's 10th Senate district election

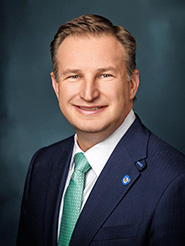
Candidate	John Lowndes	Jason Brodeur
Party	Democratic	Republican
Popular vote	125,116	98,503
Percentage	55.95	44.05
Senator before election
Jason Brodeur
Republican
Elected Senator
John Lowndes
Democratic

The incumbent was Republican Jason Brodeur, who was re-elected with 54.45% of the vote in 2022.

=== Republican primary ===
==== Nominee ====
- Jason Brodeur, incumbent state senator

=== Democratic primary ===
==== Candidates ====
===== Nominee =====
- John Lowndes, mayor of Maitland

===== Eliminated in primary =====
- H. Alexander Duncan

==== Results ====
Democratic primary results
Party	Candidate	Votes	%
Democratic	John Lowndes	24,797	70.85
Democratic	H. Alexander Duncan	10,200	20.15
Total votes		34,997	100.00

=== General election ===
General election results
Party	Candidate	Votes	%
Democratic	John Lowndes	125,116	55.95
Republican	Jason Brodeur	98,503	44.05
Total votes		223,619	100.00
Democratic gain from Republican			

== District 12 ==
2026 Florida's 12th Senate district election
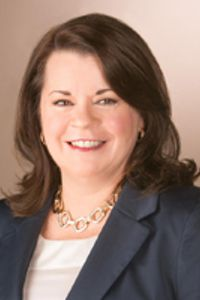

Candidate	Colleen Burton	Alfred Reynolds
Party	Republican	Democratic
Incumbent Senator
Colleen Burton
Republican

The incumbent is Republican Colleen Burton, who was elected with 63.17% of the vote in 2022.

=== Republican nominee ===
- Colleen Burton, incumbent state senator

=== Democratic nominee ===
- Alfred Reynolds, law study professor

=== General election ===
==== Results ====
General election results
Party	Candidate	Votes	%
Republican	Colleen Burton		
Democratic	Alfred Reynolds		
Total votes			

== District 14 ==
2026 Florida's 14th Senate district election
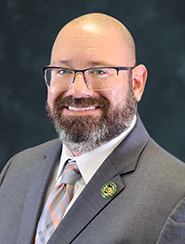

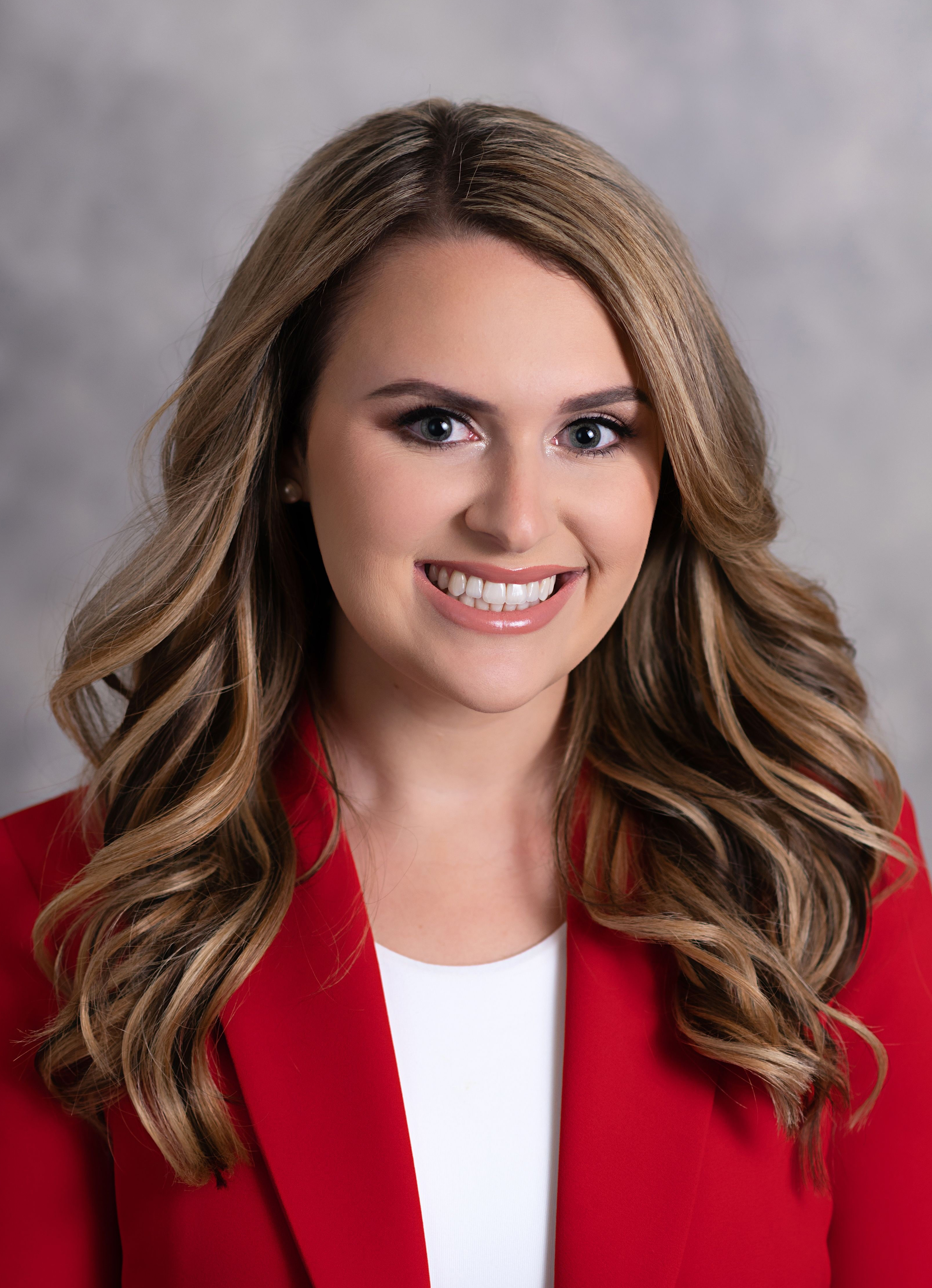
Candidate	Brian Nathan	Josie Tomkow
Party	Democratic	Republican
Incumbent Senator
Brian Nathan
Democratic

The incumbent was Republican Jay Collins, who flipped the district and was elected with 54.8% of the vote in 2022. On August 12, 2025, Collins resigned after being appointed Lieutenant Governor of Florida. A special election for the seat was held on March 24, 2026, in which Democrat Brian Nathan narrowly defeated Republican Josie Tomkow in an upset, flipping the seat back to the Democrats.

=== Democratic nominee ===
- Brian Nathan, incumbent state senator

==== Endorsements ====
Brian Nathan

Labor unions

- AFSCME Florida

=== Republican nominee ===
- Josie Tomkow, former state representative (2018–2025) and nominee for this district in the 2026 special election

=== General election ===
==== Results ====
General election results
Party	Candidate	Votes	%
Democratic	Brian Nathan		
Republican	Josie Tomkow		
Total votes			

== District 16 ==
2026 Florida's 16th Senate district election
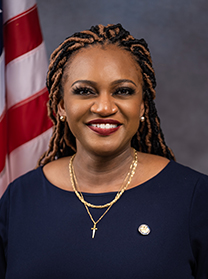
Candidate	Fentrice Driskell (Uncontested)
Party	Democratic
Senator before election
Darryl Rouson
Democratic
Elected Senator
Fentrice Driskell
Democratic

The incumbent is Democrat Darryl Rouson, who was re-elected with 63.94% of the vote in 2022. Rouson is term-limited. As no non-Democratic candidate filed in the race, state representative Fentrice Driskell, who won the Democratic primary, was elected outright upon doing so.

=== Democratic primary ===
==== Candidates ====
===== Nominee =====
- Fentrice Driskell, minority leader of the Florida House of Representatives

===== Eliminated in primary =====
- Michele Rayner, state representative

==== Endorsements ====
Fentrice Driskell

U.S. representatives

- Jim Davis, FL-11 (1997–2007)

Statewide officials

- Alex Sink, former Chief Financial Officer of Florida (2007–2011)

State legislators

- Wallace Aristide, state representative
- Lori Berman, state senator
- Daryl Campbell, state representative
- Betty Castor, former state senator (1976–1978, 1982–1986)
- Dan Daley, state representative
- Michael Gottlieb, state representative
- James Hargrett, former state senator (1993–2001)
- Adam Hattersley, former state representative (2018–2020)
- Arthenia Joyner, former state senator (2006–2016)
- Les Miller, former state senator (2000–2006)
- Frank Peterman, former state representative (2000–2008)
- Tina Polsky, state senator
- Leonard Spencer, state representative
- Kelly Skidmore, state representative
- Debra Tendrich, state representative

Local officials

- Bob Buckhorn, former mayor of Tampa (2011–2019)
- Rick Kriseman, former mayor of St. Petersburg (2014–2022)
- Gwen Miller, former Tampa city councilor (1995–2011)
- Andrew H. Warren, former state attorney for the Thirteenth Judicial Circuit of Florida (2017–2023)

Organizations

- Florida AFL-CIO
- Sierra Club Florida

Labor unions

- IBEW Locals 824 & 915
- Teamsters Local 79
Michele Rayner

State legislators

- Robin Bartleman, state representative
- LaVon Bracy Davis, state senator
- Daryl Campbell, state representative
- Joe Casello, state representative
- Hillary Cassel, state representative
- Kevin Chambliss, state representative
- Lindsay Cross, state representative
- Dan Daley, state representative
- LaVon Bracy Davis, state representative
- Tae Edmonds, state representative
- Anna Eskamani, state representative
- Ashley Gantt, state representative
- Mike Gottlieb, state representative
- Rita Harris, state representative
- Dianne Hart, state representative
- Christine Hunschofsky, state representative
- Shevrin Jones, state senator
- Rosalind Osgood, state senator
- Felicia Robinson, state representative
- Barbara Sharief, state senator
- Carlos Guillermo Smith, state senator
- Allison Tant, state representative
- Marie Woodson, state representative

Local officials

- Ken Welch, mayor of St. Petersburg

Organizations

- LGBTQ+ Victory Fund

==== Polling ====
Poll source	Date(s) administered	Sample size (Note: Key: A – all adults RV – registered voters LV – likely voters V – unclear)	Margin of error	Fentrice Driskell	Michele Rayner	Undecided
Impact Research (D)	July 22–23, 2026	402 (LV)	± 4.9%	33%	19%	48%
Impact Research (D)	May 12–16, 2026	–	± 4.9%	22%	26%	52%
Clarity Campaign Labs (Note: Poll conducted for Florida Senate Victory, the fundraising arm of the Florida Senate Democratic Caucus)	April 8–13, 2026	417 (RV)	± 4.8%	19%	31%	50%

==== Results ====
Democratic primary results
Party	Candidate	Votes	%
Democratic	Fentrice Driskell	35,924	59.66
Democratic	Michele Rayner	24,287	40.34
Total votes		60,211	100.00

=== General election ===
==== Results ====
General election results
Party	Candidate	Votes	%
Democratic	Fentrice Driskell	Unopposed	
Total votes		—	—
Democratic hold			

== District 18 ==
2026 Florida's 18th Senate district election
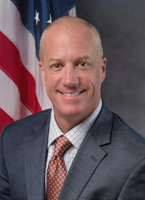

Nominee	Nick DiCeglie	Karla Kemp
Party	Republican	Democratic
Incumbent Senator
Nick DiCeglie
Republican

The incumbent is Republican Nick DiCeglie, who was elected with 56.89% of the vote in 2022.

=== Republican nominee ===
- Nick DiCeglie, incumbent state senator

=== Democratic primary ===
==== Candidates ====
===== Nominee =====
- Karla Kemp, sustainability consultant (previously ran for Congress)

===== Eliminated in primary =====
- Linda Harris

==== Results ====
Democratic primary results
Party	Candidate	Votes	%
Democratic	Karla Kemp	21,442	59.85
Democratic	Linda Harris	14,385	40.15
Total votes		35,827	100.00

=== General election ===
==== Post-primary endorsements ====
Nick DiCeglie

Sheriffs

- Bob Gualtieri, Pinellas County sheriff

==== Results ====
General election results
Party	Candidate	Votes	%
Republican	Nick DiCeglie		
Democratic	Karla Kemp		
Total votes			

== District 20 ==
2026 Florida's 20th Senate district election
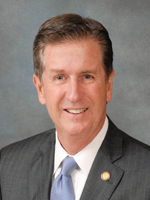

Candidate	Jim Boyd	Gerald Baldi
Party	Republican	Democratic
Incumbent state senator
Jim Boyd
Republican

The incumbent is Republican Jim Boyd, who was re-elected unopposed in 2022.

=== Republican nominee ===
- Jim Boyd, incumbent state senator

=== Democratic primary ===
==== Candidates ====
===== Nominee =====
- Gerald Baldi

===== Eliminated in primary =====
- John Houman, retired engineer and perennial candidate

==== Results ====
Democratic primary results
Party	Candidate	Votes	%
Democratic	Gerald Baldi	20,187	66.83
Democratic	John Houman	10,018	33.17
Total votes		30,205	100.00

=== General election ===
==== Results ====
General election results
Party	Candidate	Votes	%
Republican	Jim Boyd		
Democratic	Gerald Baldi		
Total votes			

== District 22 ==
2026 Florida's 22nd Senate district election
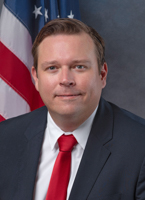

Candidate	James Buchanan	Lew Wasserman
Party	Republican	Democratic
Incumbent Senator
Joe Gruters
Republican

The incumbent is Republican Joe Gruters, who was re-elected unopposed in 2022. Gruters is term-limited.

=== Republican primary ===
==== Candidates ====
===== Nominee =====
- James Buchanan, state representative

===== Eliminated in primary =====
- Victor Rohe, Sarasota Memorial Hospital board member

===== Withdrew =====
- Andrew Clough

===== Declined =====
- Fiona McFarland, state representative (running for re-election, endorsed Buchanan)

==== Endorsements ====
James Buchanan

State legislators

- Ben Albritton, President of the Florida Senate
- Jim Boyd, Majority Leader of the Florida Senate
- Fiona McFarland, state representative
- Jay Trumbull, state senator from the 2nd district

Organizations

- Florida Chamber of Commerce

==== Results ====
Republican primary results
Party	Candidate	Votes	%
Republican	James Buchanan	51,298	77.84
Republican	Victor Rohe	14,605	22.16
Total votes		65,903	100.00

=== Democratic primary ===
==== Nominee ====
- Lew Wasserman

==== Failed to qualify ====
- Arianna O'Donnell

=== Independents ===
- Martin Hyde, Republican candidate for Florida's 16th congressional district in 2022

=== General election ===
==== Results ====
General election results
Party	Candidate	Votes	%
Republican	James Buchanan		
Democratic	Lew Wasserman		
Independent	Martin Hyde		
Total votes			

== District 24 ==
2026 Florida's 24th Senate district election
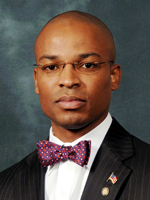

Candidate	Mack Bernard	Jackie Green
Party	Democratic	Republican
Incumbent Senator
Mack Bernard
Democratic

The incumbent is Democrat Mack Bernard, who was elected unopposed in a special election in 2024.

=== Democratic primary ===
==== Candidates ====
===== Nominee =====
- Mack Bernard, incumbent state senator

===== Declined =====
- David Silvers, former state representative (2016–2024) (running in the 26th district)

=== Republican nominee ===
- Jackie Green

=== General election ===
==== Post-primary endorsements ====
Mack Bernard

Newspapers

- The Palm Beach Post

==== Results ====
General election results
Party	Candidate	Votes	%
Democratic	Mack Bernard		
Republican	Jackie Green		
Total votes			

== District 26 ==
2026 Florida's 26th Senate district election
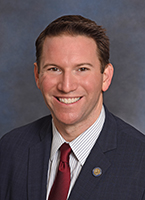

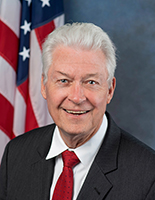
Candidate	David Silvers	Rick Roth
Party	Democratic	Republican
Incumbent Senator
Lori Berman
Democratic

The incumbent is Democrat Lori Berman, who was re-elected with 54.8% of the vote in 2022. Berman is term-limited.

=== Democratic primary ===
==== Candidates ====
===== Nominee =====
- David Silvers, former state representative (2016–2024)

===== Withdrawn =====
- Yvette Drucker, deputy mayor of Boca Raton (running for Palm Beach County clerk)

==== Endorsements ====
Yvette Drucker (withdrawn)

State legislators

- Lori Berman, incumbent state senator for this district
- Tina Polsky, state senator
David Silvers

State legislators

- Daryl Campbell, state representative
- Joe Casello, state representative
- Hillary Cassel, state representative
- Kevin Chambliss, state representative
- Dan Daley, state representative
- Tracie Davis, state senator
- Ben Diamond, former state representative (2016–2022)
- Bobby DuBose, former state representative (2014–2022)
- Nick Duran, former state representative (2016–2022)
- Katie Edwards-Walpole, former state representative (2012–2018)
- Javier Fernandez, former state representative (2018–2020)
- Joe Geller, former state representative (2014–2022)
- Mike Gottlieb, state representative
- Evan Jenne, former state representative (2014–2022)
- Shevrin Jones, state senator
- Darryl Rouson, state senator
- Kelly Skidmore, state representative
- Susan Valdes, state representative
- Katherine Waldron, state representative
- Matt Willhite, former state representative (2016–2024)

=== Republican primary ===
==== Candidates ====
===== Nominee =====
- Rick Roth, state representative

===== Failed to qualify =====
- Stephen Iacullo, attorney and businessman

=== General election ===
==== Post-primary endorsements ====
David Silvers

Newspapers

- The Palm Beach Post

==== Results ====
General election results
Party	Candidate	Votes	%
Democratic	David Silvers		
Republican	Rick Roth		
Total votes			

== District 28 ==
2026 Florida's 28th Senate district election
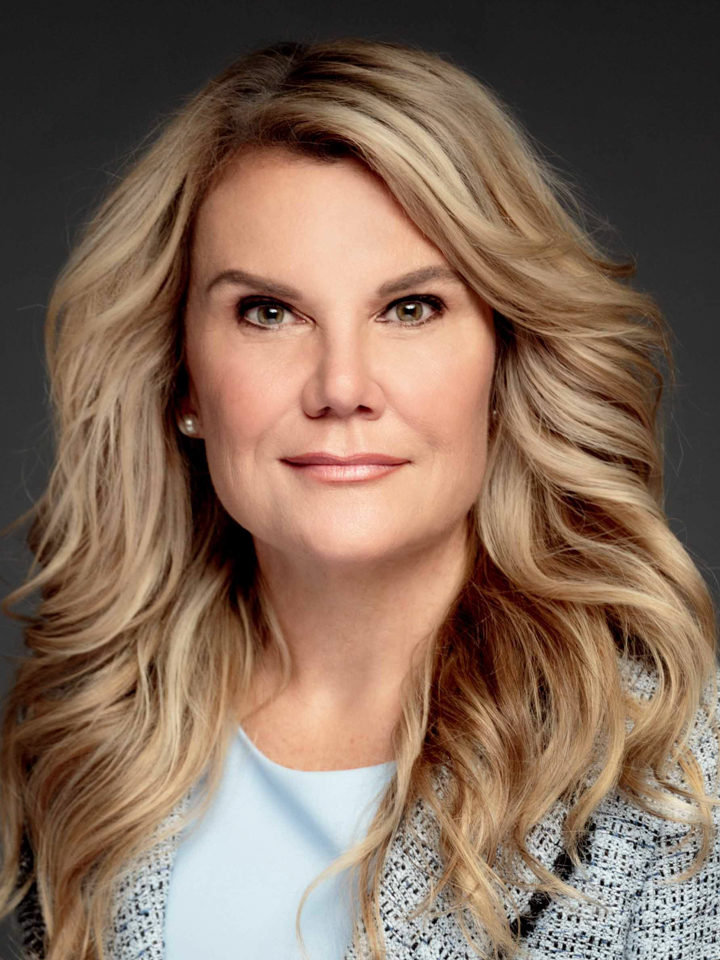

Candidate	Lauren Melo	David Silverberg
Party	Republican	Democratic
Incumbent Senator
Kathleen Passidomo
Republican

The incumbent is Republican Kathleen Passidomo, who was re-elected unopposed in 2022. Passidomo is term-limited.

=== Republican primary ===
==== Candidates ====
===== Nominee =====
- Lauren Melo, state representative

===== Withdrawn =====
- Bob Rommel, former state representative (2016–2024)

==== Endorsements ====
Lauren Melo

State legislators

- Ben Albritton, President of the Florida Senate
- Jim Boyd, state senator
- Kathleen Passidomo, incumbent senator for this district
- Jay Trumbull, state senator

Organizations

- Florida Chamber of Commerce

=== Democratic nominee ===
- David Silverberg, journalist

=== General election ===
==== Results ====
General election results
Party	Candidate	Votes	%
Republican	Lauren Melo		
Democratic	David Silverberg		
Total votes			

== District 30 ==
2024 Florida's 30th Senate district election
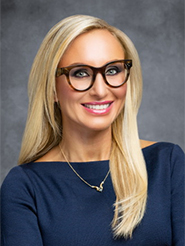

Nominee	Lauren Book	Hector Rivera
Party	Democratic	Republican
Incumbent Senator
Tina Polsky
Democratic

The incumbent is Democrat Tina Polsky, who was re-elected with 55.4% of the vote in 2022. She is retiring.

=== Democratic primary ===
==== Candidates ====
===== Nominee =====
- Lauren Book, former minority leader of the Florida Senate (2021–2024) from the 35th district (2016–2024)

===== Declined =====
- Dan Daley, state representative from the 96th district (2019–present) (running for re-election)
- Tina Polsky, incumbent state senator

==== Endorsements ====
Lauren Book

U.S. representatives

- Jared Moskowitz, Florida's 23rd congressional district (2023–present)

State legislators

- Lori Berman, state senator
- Mack Bernard, state senator
- Tina Polsky, incumbent state senator for this district
- Kevin Rader, former state senator (2016–2020)

Organizations

- Dolphin Democrats

=== Republican primary ===
==== Candidates ====
===== Nominee =====
- Hector Rivera

===== Eliminated in primary =====
- Jerusa Zitta

==== Results ====
Republican primary results
Party	Candidate	Votes	%
Republican	Hector Rivera	10,601	61.33
Republican	Jerusa Zitta	6,683	38.67
Total votes		17,284	100.00

=== General election ===
==== Post-primary endorsements ====
Lauren Book

Organizations

- Giffords

Newspapers

- The Palm Beach Post

==== Results ====
General election results
Party	Candidate	Votes	%
Democratic	Lauren Book		
Republican	Hector Rivera		
Total votes			

== District 32 ==
2026 Florida's 32nd State Senate district election
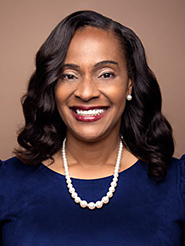

Candidate	Rosalind Osgood	Crescente Furnaguera
Party	Democratic	Independent
Incumbent Senator
Rosalind Osgood
Democratic

The incumbent is Democrat Rosalind Osgood, who was re-elected unopposed in 2022.

=== Democratic nominee ===
- Rosalind Osgood, incumbent state senator

=== Independents ===
==== Declared ====
- Crescente Furnaguera

==== Failed to qualify ====
- Ruth Carter-Lynch, businesswoman

=== General election ===
==== Results ====
General election results
Party	Candidate	Votes	%
Democratic	Rosalind Osgood		
Independent	Crescente Furnaguera		
Total votes			

== District 34 ==
2026 Florida's 34th Senate district election
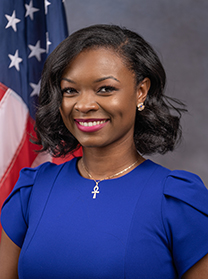
Candidate	Ashley Gantt	Elizabeth Jeanty
Party	Democratic	Republican
Incumbent Senator
Shevrin Jones
Democratic

The incumbent is Democratic Shevrin Jones, who was re-elected unopposed in 2022. He is retiring to run for Congress.

=== Democratic primary ===
==== Candidates ====
===== Nominee =====
- Ashley Gantt, state representative from the 109th district (2022–present)

===== Eliminated in primary =====
- Shannan Ighodaro
- Christine Alexandria Sanon-Jules Olivo

===== Withdrew =====
- Pitchie Escarment

===== Declined =====
- Shevrin Jones, incumbent state senator (running for Congress, endorsed Gantt)

==== Endorsements ====
Ashley Gantt

State legislators

- Kristen Arrington, state senator
- Lori Berman, state senator
- Mack Bernard, state senator
- LaVon Bracy Davis, state senator
- Tracie Davis, state senator
- Shevrin Jones, incumbent state senator for this district
- Carlos Guillermo Smith, state senator
- Brian Nathan, state senator
- Rosalind Osgood, state senator
- Tina Polsky, state senator
- Darryl Rouson, state senator
- Barbara Sharief, state senator

Local officials

- Eileen Higgins, mayor of Miami
- Daniella Levine Cava, mayor of Miami-Dade County (previously endorsed Jones)

Newspapers

- Miami Herald

Labor unions

- AFSCME Florida Council 79
- Associated Builders and Contractors Florida East Coast chapter
- Florida & South Florida AFL-CIOs
- SEIU Local 1991
Shevrin Jones (declined)

Local officials

- ~~Daniella Levine Cava, mayor of Miami-Dade County~~ (switched endorsement to Gantt after Jones declined)

==== Results ====
Democratic primary results
Party	Candidate	Votes	%
Democratic	Ashley Gantt	26,401	62.56
Democratic	Shannan Ighodaro	8,796	20.84
Democratic	Christine Alexandria Sanon-Jules Olivo	7,007	16.60
Total votes		42,204	100.00

=== Republican nominee ===
- Elizabeth Jeanty

=== Independents ===
==== Candidates ====
===== Did not qualify =====
- Francisco Amador

=== General election ===
==== Results ====
General election results
Party	Candidate	Votes	%
Democratic	Ashley Gantt		
Republican	Elizabeth Jeanty		
Total votes			

== District 36 ==
2026 Florida's 36th Senate district election
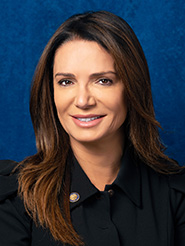

Candidate	Ileana Garcia	George Lavin
Party	Republican	Democratic
Incumbent Senator
Ileana Garcia
Republican

The incumbent is Republican Ileana Garcia, who was re-elected with 59.19% of the vote in 2022.

=== Republican nominee ===
- Ileana Garcia, incumbent state senator

=== Democratic nominee ===
- George Lávin, legal consultant

=== General election ===
==== Results ====
General election results
Party	Candidate	Votes	%
Republican	Ileana Garcia		
Democratic	George Lavin		
Total votes			

== District 38 ==
2026 Florida's 38th Senate district election
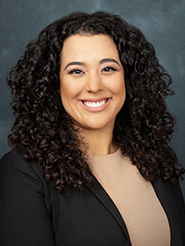

Candidate	Alexis Calatayud	Richard Lamondin
Party	Republican	Democratic
Incumbent Senator
Alexis Calatayud
Republican

The incumbent is Republican Alexis Calatayud, who flipped the district and was elected with 54.39% of the vote in 2022.

=== Republican nominee ===
- Alexis Calatayud, incumbent state senator

=== Democratic primary ===
==== Candidates ====
===== Nominee =====
- Richard Lamondin, environmental services company CEO (previously ran for Congress)

===== Withdrew =====
- Heniy Dixon

==== Endorsements ====
Richard Lamondin

Party officials

- Nikki Fried, chair of the Florida Democratic Party (2023–present)

State legislators

- Kristen Arrington, SD-25 (2024–present)
- Lori Berman, SD-31 (2018–present)
- Mack Bernard, SD-24 (2024–present)
- LaVon Bracy Davis, SD-15 (2025–present)
- Tracie Davis, SD-05 (2022–present)
- Ashley Gantt, HD-109 (2022–present)
- Shevrin Jones, SD-34 (2020–present)
- Juan-Carlos Planas, HD-114 (2002–2010) (Democrat, elected as a Republican)
- Tina Polsky, SD-30 (2022–present)

Local officials

- Kevin Burns, former mayor of North Miami (2005–2009)
- Manny Diaz, former mayor of Miami (2001–2009)
- Cindy Lerner, former mayor of Pinecrest (2008–2016)
- David Richardson, Miami Beach city commissioner (2019–present)
- Ken Russell, former Miami city commissioner (2015–2022)

Individuals

- Marvin Dunn, historian and activist
- Robin Peguero, former investigative counsel for the January 6 Committee and candidate for Florida's 27th congressional district in 2026
- Eliott Rodriguez, television journalist and candidate for Florida's 27th congressional district in 2026

=== Independent ===
- Jeffrey Solomon

=== General election ===
==== Post-primary endorsements ====
Richard Lamondin

Local officials

- Daniella Levine Cava, mayor of Miami-Dade County

Organizations

- Giffords

==== Polling ====
Poll source	Date(s) administered	Sample size	Margin of error	Alexis Calatayud (R)	Richard Lamondin	Other	Undecided
Impact Research (D)	October 5–8, 2026	400 (LV)	± 4.9%	40%	40%	4% (Note: Jeffrey Solomon (I) with 4%)	15%
Impact Research (D)	July 2026	–	–	43%	36%	–	21%

==== Results ====
General election results
Party	Candidate	Votes	%
Republican	Alexis Calatayud		
Democratic	Richard Lamondin		
Independent	Jeffrey Solomon		
Total votes			

== District 40 ==
2026 Florida's 40th Senate district election
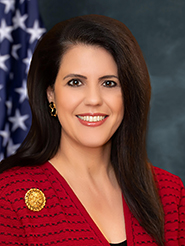

Candidate	Ana Maria Rodriguez	Jose Antonio Stoute
Party	Republican	Democratic
Incumbent Senator
Ana Maria Rodriguez
Republican

The incumbent is Republican Ana Maria Rodriguez, who was re-elected unopposed in 2022.

=== Republican primary ===
==== Candidates ====
===== Nominee =====
- Ana Maria Rodriguez, incumbent state senator

===== Withdrew =====
- Marco Insua

=== Democratic primary ===
==== Candidates ====
===== Nominee =====
- Jose Antonio Stoute

===== Withdrew =====
- James Carles

=== Independents ===
- Ramiro Orta

=== General election ===
==== Results ====
General election results
Party	Candidate	Votes	%
Republican	Ana Maria Rodriguez		
Democratic	Jose Antonion Stoute		
Independent	Ramiro Orta		
Total votes			

== See also ==
- 2026 Florida elections
  - 2026 Florida gubernatorial election
  - 2026 Florida Attorney General election
  - 2026 Florida Chief Financial Officer election
  - 2026 Florida Commissioner of Agriculture election
  - 2026 Florida House of Representatives election
- List of Florida state legislatures
- Politics of Florida
  - Political party strength in Florida
  - Florida Democratic Party
  - Republican Party of Florida
- Government of Florida

== Notes ==
Partisan clients
