= 2026 Florida Chief Financial Officer election =

2026 election in Florida

- November 3, 2026
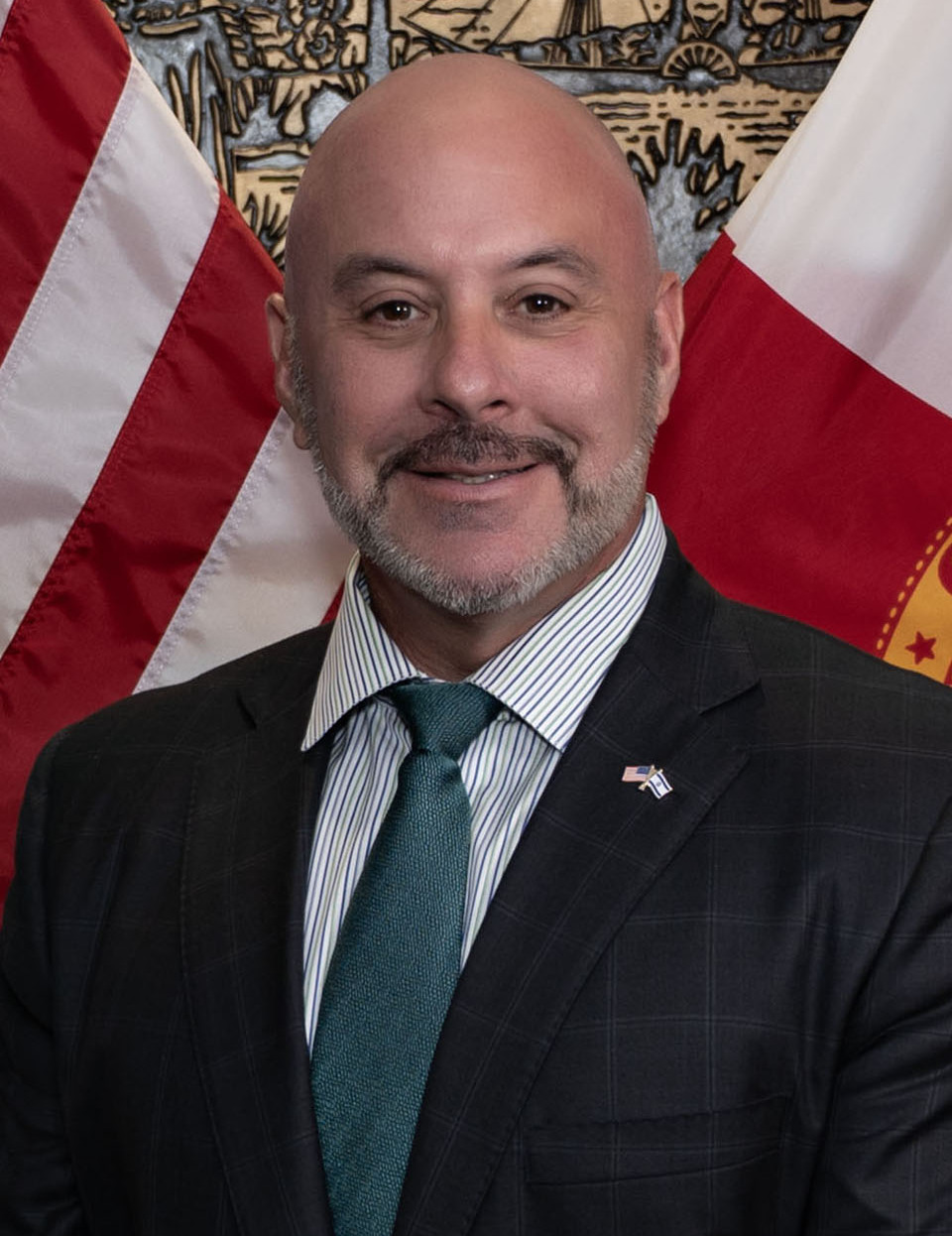

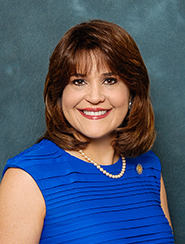
Nominee	Blaise Ingoglia	Annette Taddeo
Party	Republican	Democratic
Popular vote	4,151,579	3,997,931
Percentage	50.9%	49.1%
- Ingoglia: 50–60% 60–70% 70–80% 80–90% Taddeo: 50–60% 60–70%
Chief Financial Officer before election
Blaise Ingoglia
Republican
Elected Chief Financial Officer
Blaise Ingoglia
Republican

The 2026 Florida Chief Financial Officer election took place on Tuesday, November 3, 2026, to elect the Chief Financial Officer of Florida. Incumbent CFO Jimmy Patronis resigned on March 31, 2025, to run for Congress in a special election for Florida's 1st congressional district.

== Background ==
Incumbent Republican CFO Jimmy Patronis won re-election to a second term with 59.48% of the vote in 2022. On November 13, 2024, Matt Gaetz, U.S. Representative for Florida's 1st congressional district, resigned after president-elect Donald Trump nominated him to be Attorney General of the United States. On November 25, 2024, Patronis announced that he would run in the special election for the seat. That same day, he submitted his resignation, effective March 31, 2025. On July 16, 2025, Governor Ron DeSantis appointed state senator Blaise Ingoglia to the position.

== Interim appointment ==
=== Appointee ===
- Blaise Ingoglia, state senator from the 11th district (2022–2025)

=== Considered but not appointed ===
- Mike Caruso, state representative (2018–present)
- Joe Gruters, state senator from the 22nd district (2018–present) and treasurer of the Republican National Committee (2025–present)

== Republican primary ==
=== Candidates ===
==== Nominee ====
- Blaise Ingoglia, incumbent chief financial officer (2025–present)

==== Eliminated in primary ====
- Frank Collige, businessman and Air Force veteran

==== Withdrawn ====
- Joe Gruters, state senator from the 22nd district (2018–present) (appointed chair of the Republican National Committee)
- Benjamin Horbowy, candidate for Florida's 3rd Senate district in 2020
- Kevin Steele, state representative from the 55th district (2022–present) (running for U.S. House)

==== Declined ====
- Jimmy Patronis, U.S. representative from Florida's 1st congressional district (2025–present) and former chief financial officer (2017–2025)

=== Endorsements ===
Blaise Ingoglia

U.S. senators

- Ashley Moody, Florida (2025–present)

U.S. representatives

- Aaron Bean, FL-04 (2023–present)
- Gus Bilirakis, FL-12 (2007–present)
- Kat Cammack, FL-03 (2021–present)
- Mike Haridopolos, FL-08 (2025–present)
- Brian Mast, FL-21 (2017–present)

Statewide officials

- Jeff Atwater, former Chief Financial Officer of Florida (2011–2017)
- Tom Gallagher, former Chief Financial Officer of Florida (2003–2007)
- Jimmy Patronis, former Chief Financial Officer of Florida (2017–2025)

State legislators

- 16 state senators
- 54 state representatives (Note: including: Danny Alvarez, state representative from the 69th district (2022–present); Adam Anderson, state representative from the 57th district (2022–present); James Buchanan, state representative from the 74th district (2018–present); Bill Conerly, state representative from the 72nd district (2024–present); J. J. Grow, state representative from the 23rd district (2024–present); Jeff Holcomb, state representative from the 53rd district (2022–present); Berny Jacques, state representative from the 59th district (2022–present); Fiona McFarland, state representative from the 73rd district (2020–present); Danny Nix, state representative from the 75th district (2024–present); Michael Owen, state representative from the 70th district (2024–present); Will Robinson, state representative from the 71st district (2018–present); Brad Yeager, state representative from the 56th district (2022–present))
- 2 former state representatives

Local officials

- 60 sheriffs

Individuals

- John Temple, president of Lake–Sumter State College

Organizations

- Gun Owners of America
- Republican Party of Florida
Kevin Steele (withdrawn)

U.S. senators

- Rick Scott, Florida (2019–present) (previously endorsed Gruters)
Joe Gruters (withdrawn)

Executive branch officials

- Donald Trump, president of the United States (2017–2021, 2025–present)

U.S. senators

- Rick Scott, Florida (2019–present) (switched endorsement to Steele after Gruters withdrew)

U.S. representatives

- Randy Fine, FL-06 (2025–present)
- Jimmy Patronis, FL-01 (2025–present) (later endorsed Ingoglia)

Statewide officials

- Tom Gallagher, former Chief Financial Officer of Florida (2003–2007) (later endorsed Ingoglia)
- Wilton Simpson, Florida Commissioner of Agriculture (2023–present)

State legislators

- Ben Albritton, President of the Florida Senate (2024–present) from the 27th district (2022–present)
- Jim Boyd, Majority Leader of the Florida Senate (2024–present) from the 20th district (2020–present)
- Jason Brodeur, President pro tempore of the Florida Senate (2024–present) from the 10th district (2020–present)
- Daniel Perez, speaker of the Florida House of Representatives (2024–present) from the 116th district (2018–present)
- 17 other state senators (Note: Jennifer Bradley, state senator from the 6th district (2022–present); Danny Burgess, state senator from the 23rd district (2020–present); Colleen Burton, state senator from the 12th district (2022–present); Alexis Calatayud, state senator from the 38th district (2022–present); Don Gaetz, state senator from the 1st district (2006–2016, 2024–present); Ileana Garcia, state senator from the 36th district (2020–present); Erin Grall, state senator from the 29th district (2022–present); Ed Hooper, state senator from the 21st district (2018–present); Tom Leek, state senator from the 7th district (2024–present); Stan McClain, state senator from the 9th district (2024–present); Kathleen Passidomo, state senator from the 28th district (2016–present); Ana Maria Rodriguez, state senator from the 40th district (2020–present); Keith Truenow, state senator from the 13th district (2024–present); Tom Wright, state senator from the 8th district (2018–present); Clay Yarborough, state senator from the 4th district (2022–present))

=== Results ===
Primary results by county: Ingoglia: 50–60%; 60–70%; Collige: 50–60%

Republican primary results
Party	Candidate	Votes	%
Republican	Blaise Ingoglia (incumbent)	967,504	61.3
Republican	Frank Collige	610,348	38.7
Total votes		1,577,852	100.0

== Democratic primary ==
=== Candidates ===
==== Nominee ====
- Annette Taddeo, former state senator from the 40th district (2017–2022), nominee for lieutenant governor in 2014, nominee for Florida's 27th congressional district in 2022, and nominee for Miami-Dade County Clerk in 2024

==== Eliminated in primary ====
- Earle Ford, attorney and U.S. Army veteran (previously ran for U.S. House)

=== Endorsements ===
Earle Ford

Party officials

- Nikki Fried, chair of the Florida Democratic Party (2023–present)
Annette Taddeo

U.S. representatives

- Al Lawson, Florida's 5th congressional district (2017–2023)
- Kendrick Meek, Florida's 17th congressional district (2003–2011)
- Donna Shalala, Florida's 21st congressional district (2019–2021)

Statewide officials

- Alex Sink, former Chief Financial Officer of Florida (2007–2011)

State legislators

- Kristen Arrington, state senator
- Lori Berman, minority leader of the Florida Senate
- Mack Bernard, state senator
- Kevin Chambliss, state representative
- Tracie Davis, state senator
- Fentrice Driskell, minority leader of the Florida House of Representatives
- Anna Eskamani, state representative
- Ashley Gantt, state representative
- Carlos Guillermo Smith, state senator
- Kionne McGhee, former state representative (2012–2020)
- Linda Stewart, former state senator (2016–2024)
- Vic Torres, former state senator (2016–2024)

Local officials

- Jerry Demings, mayor of Orange County (2018–present)
- Javier Fernandez, mayor of South Miami
- Dan Gelber, former mayor of Miami Beach (2017–2023)
- Daniella Levine Cava, mayor of Miami-Dade County (2020–present)
- Bobby Powell, Palm Beach County commissioner

Labor unions

- AFSCME Florida
- CWA Florida
- Florida AFL-CIO
- Teamsters Joint Council 75
- SEIU Florida & Local 1991

=== Results ===
Primary results by county: Taddeo: 50–60%; 60–70%; 70–80%; Ford: 50–60%

Democratic primary results
Party	Candidate	Votes	%
Democratic	Annette Taddeo	795,964	65.6
Democratic	Earle Ford	416,578	34.4
Total votes		1,212,542	100.0

== General election ==
=== Post-primary endorsements ===
Annette Taddeo (D)

Newspapers

- Miami Herald

=== Polling ===
Poll source	Date(s) administered	Sample size (Note: Key: A – all adults RV – registered voters LV – likely voters V – unclear)	Margin of error	Blaise Ingoglia (R)	Annette Taddeo (D)	Other	Undecided
St. Pete Polls	October 25–27, 2026	916 (LV)	± 3.2%	47%	43%	–	9%
St. Pete Polls (Note: Poll conducted for Florida Politics)	October 5–7, 2026	836 (LV)	± 3.4%	44%	42%	–	14%
Targoz Market Research (Note: Poll sponsored by the James Madison Institute, a conservative think tank)	September 28 – October 4, 2026	853 (LV)	–	43%	43%	4% (Note: "Another candidate" with 4%)	10%
Targoz Market Research	September 28 – October 4, 2026	1,166 (RV)	± 2.77%	40%	38%	5% (Note: "Another candidate" with 5%)	17%
SEA Polling (D) (Note: Poll sponsored by Taddeo's campaign)	September 7–13, 2026	701 (LV)	± 3.7%	42%	42%	–	16%
Change Research (D) (Note: Poll sponsored by Freedom Project USA)	September 7–9, 2026	1,107 (LV)	± 2.8%	44%	44%	1% (Note: "Would not vote" with 1%)	11%
Ruth’s List Florida (Note: Poll sponsored by Ruth's List, which supports Taddeo)	April 23–30, 2026	1,828 (LV)	± 2.8%	38%	39%	–	23%

=== Results ===
2026 Florida Chief Financial Officer election
Party	Candidate	Votes	%	±%
Republican	Blaise Ingoglia (incumbent)			
Democratic	Annette Taddeo			
Total votes			100.0%	

== Notes ==
Partisan clients
