= Josie Tomkow =

American politician (born 1995)

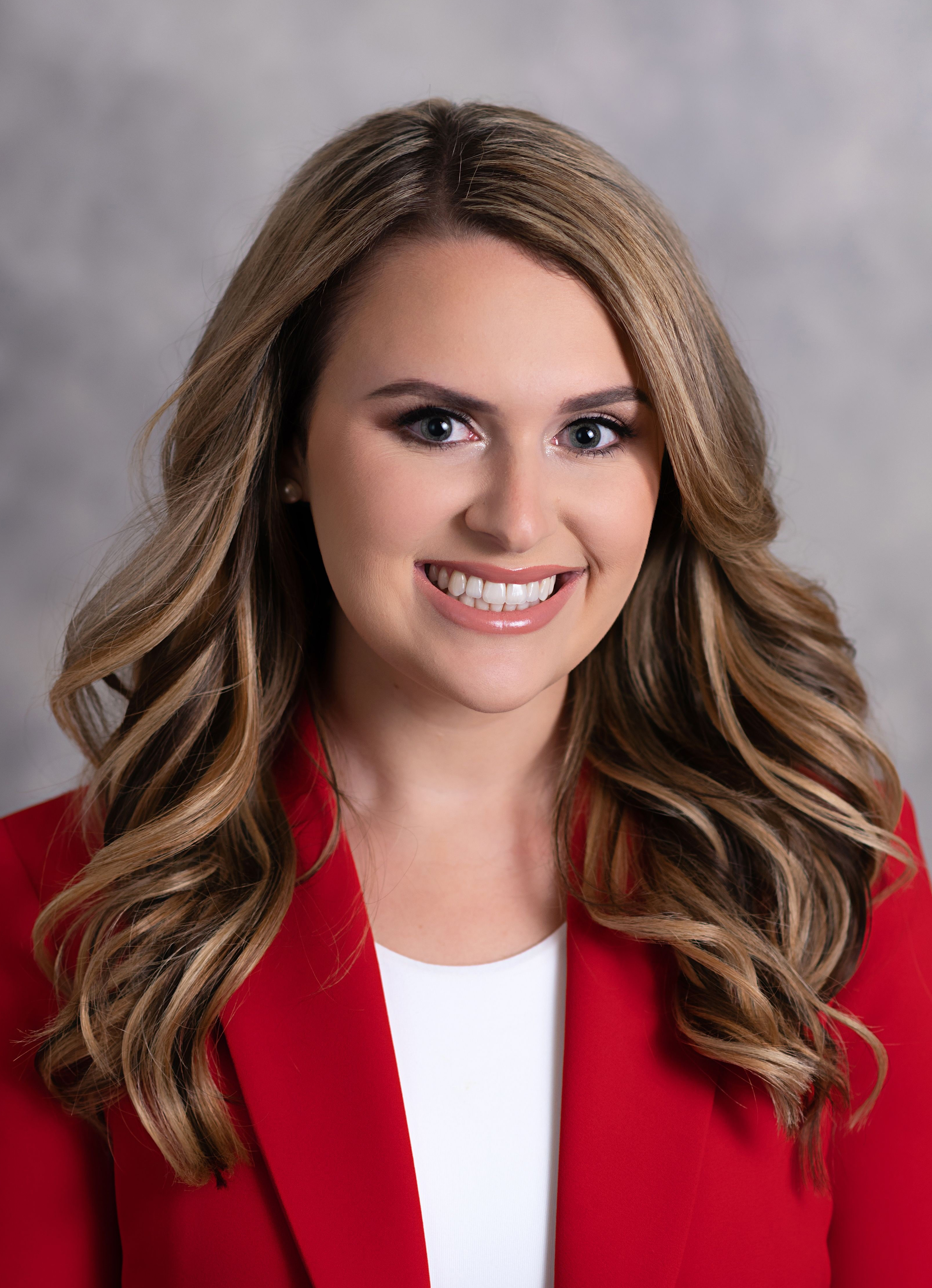
- Tomkow in 2020

Member of the Florida House of Representatives
- In office May 1, 2018 – March 17, 2026
- Preceded by: Neil Combee
- Succeeded by: Hilary Holley
- Constituency: 39th district (2018–2022); 51st district (2022–2026)

Personal details
- Born: Josie Taylor Tomkow; October 15, 1995 (age 31) Tampa, Florida, US
- Party: Republican
- Education: University of Florida (BA)
- Occupation: Cattle rancher

Josie Taylor Tomkow (born October 15, 1995) is an American politician who served in the Florida Legislature in the 39th district from 2018 to 2022 and the 51st district from 2022 to 2026 in the Florida House of Representatives. She is a member of the Republican Party.

== Florida House of Representatives ==
Tomkow defeated Jennifer Spath in a special Republican primary for the vacant 39th House district seat on February 20, 2018. Tomkow then won the May 1, 2018 special election, defeating Democrat Ricky Shirah with 59.9% of the vote. At the time of her election to the House, Tomkow was 22 years old.

Tomkow again defeated Shirah by a similar margin in the November 6, 2018 general election.

Based on a review of 2018 traffic citations, questions have been raised whether Tomkow meets residency requirements to hold her seat.

In the 2022 Florida House of Representatives election, she was elected in Florida's 51st House of Representatives district.

In November 2025, Tomkow announced her intent to resign from the Florida House of Representatives in order to run in a special election for the Florida Senate in District 14. In this special election, she lost to Democrat Brian Nathan. She has said she will run again in the general election in November.

== Legislative Record ==
Josie Tomkow was a Representative in Florida's House for 8 years and in that time supported numerous bills and voted on legislation. In addition, she was on several committees including: Health & Human Services Committee, House Budget Committee, and the Commerce Committee. During that time she was regarded as a Champion for Agriculture 4 times and received the Conservative Excellence Awards in 5 different years.

Josie Tomkow signed on to notable bills that sought to limit worker's rights in Florida. This includes HB 1197 (2022), which would have prevented paycheck deductions for union dues, added anti-union language to membership forms, and required data collection. This bill passed the House (with Tomkow's support), but died in the Senate. In addition, she voted for HB11 (2017), which would have decertified any union, except first responders and corrections unions, that represented less than half of the workforce for those organizations. Again, this passed the House, but dies in the Senate.

In 2022, Tomkow signed on to SB 962. This bill passed and was signed into law by Governor Ron DeSantis. It allowed mixed-use developments to be built on all zoned areas and was put in as a solution to the affordable housing crisis. She supported other legislation that protected Floridians by requiring safety inspection schedules for condominium buildings by voting for SB4-D in 2022.

One of her areas of interest while in office was bolstering the rights of corporations and businesses. Josie Tomkow signed on to HB 741 in 2022, a bill drafted by Florida Power and Light, which would have limited rooftop solar expansion. This would have hurt small businesses and threatened jobs connected to the solar industry. This bill was eventually vetoed by Governor Ron DeSantis. Rep. Tomkow also signed SB 620 (2022); a bill that would have prevented local officials from regulating nuisance businesses, such as pain management clinics, or "pill mills", and dog businesses that over breed, or "puppy mills." If local governments regulated industries such as these, the businesses could sue, and taxpayers would be responsible for the payout.

Other bills Representative Josie Tomkow supported that propped up the interests of big business and corporations were: HB 1601/SB 88 (2021)- prevents class action lawsuits against farmers, including Big Sugar for pollution and degradation to the environment and was signed into law, HB 537 (2022)- would have allowed landlords to impose non-refundable monthly fees on tenants and this bill died in the Senate, and HB 15/SB 50 (2021)- that was signed into law and authorizes expanded collection of online sales taxes. The revenue generated from these is being used to bail out big businesses from paying tax on commercial leases and from paying Unemployment Insurance Premiums.

Based on her legislative record, Josie Tomkow had a low score for supporting the People of Florida by the organization People First. They analyzed numerous bills that Rep. Tomkow supported and those are available on their website along with the rationale for the score. However, organizations like the NRA and the Florida Chamber of Commerce support her legislative record and currently support her bid for State Senate District 14.

== 2026 Election for State Senate District 14 ==
The seat for Florida State Senate District 14 was vacated in 2025 when Governor Ron DeSantis named Jay Collins as Florida's new Lieutenant Governor and a special election was held in March of 2026. The Democratic candidate, Brian Nathan, edged out Republican candidate Josie Tomkow. Nathan received 50.26% or 40,245 of the votes while Tomkow received 49.74% or 39,836 votes. Brian Nathan currently holds the seat for State Senate District 14.

Both Josie Tomkow and Brian Nathan are on the ballot again for the November Mid-Term elections 2026. Josie Tomkow is running on her experience, her connection to the agriculture industry, and her support from local law enforcement. Candidate Brian Nathan is running on a working families agenda and his background as a US Navy Veteran, Union Electrician, labor leader, and family man. Florida's election runs in October and November. In Hillsborough County, early voting takes place from October 19th - November 1st and voters can go to any Early Voting Polling place between 7am and 7pm. Election Day is Tuesday, November 3rd. Voters must go to their specified precinct location between the hours of 7am and 7pm.

== Key Issues in the 2026 Election for State Senate District 14 ==
Josie Tomkow's campaign has accused her opponent Brian Nathan of being a socialist and communist. This stems from Nathan's participation in a May Day rally where Nathan joined to support unions and worker's rights. However, in the background is a banner that had the word 'socialist' on it. In addition, Tomkow's campaign points to an endorsement from Florida Rising, a local organization that states they empower minority communities to get engaged and active politically. Republicans have dubbed Florida Rising as a socialist organization. This strategy has been a trend in the 2026 midterm elections as Republican candidates nation-wide are attacking their opponents with similar rhetoric.

Josie Tomkow has not been immune to attacks from the Nathan campaign. Tomkow's legislative record that supports Big Business and Corporations has been called into question as many of the bills sponsored and supported do not put Floridians first. In addition, Tomkow's legislative records has votes for bills that have attacked worker's rights, defunded public schools, and harmed Florida's environment.

Florida's State Senate District 14 election is underway and official election information can be found at the Hillsborough County Supervisor of Elections website.
