= Lieutenant Governor Collins =

Lieutenant Governor Collins may refer to:

- David Collins (1756–1810), 1st Lieutenant Governor of Van Diemen's Land
- Jay Collins (born 1976), 21st Lieutenant Governor of Florida
- Martha Layne Collins (1936–2025), 48th Lieutenant Governor of Kentucky
