= Senator Nathan =

Senator Nathan may refer to:

- Brian Nathan (fl. 2020s), Florida State Senate
- Shirley Nathan-Pulliam (born 1939), Maryland State Senate
