= 2018 Florida Senate election =

- November 6, 2018

22 of the 40 seats in the Florida Senate (and 2 special elections) 21 seats needed for a majority
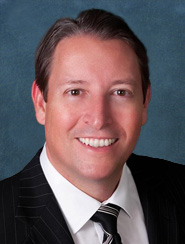

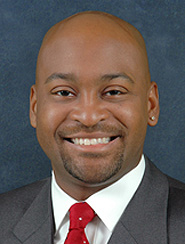
	Majority party	Minority party
Leader	Bill Galvano	Oscar Braynon
Party	Republican	Democratic
Leader since	November 29, 2016	November 21, 2016
Leader's seat	10th	35th
Last election	25	15
Seats before	24	16
Seats after	23	17
Seat change	▼1	▲1
Popular vote	2,044,404	1,731,716
Percentage	53.99%	45.74%
Seats up	15	7
- Results: Democratic gain Republican hold Democratic hold No election
President before election
Joe Negron
Republican
Elected President
Bill Galvano
Republican

In the elections to the Florida State Senate that were held on November 6, 2018, 20 of the 40 seats were contested in regular elections and two seats in special elections. The winners of the 20 regular elections would serve four-year terms from November 6, 2018, to November 6, 2022, and the winners of the two special elections would serve two-year terms from November 6, 2018, to November 6, 2020.

== Results summary ==
=== Statewide ===
			Vacant	Total
	Republican	Democratic	Vacant	Total
Last election (2016)	25	15	0	40
Before these elections	22	16	0	40
Not up	8	10	0	18
Odd (2016→2020)	8	10	0	18
Up	14	6	2	22
Even (2018→2022)	14	6	0	20
Special: Odd	0	0	2	2
Result	23	17	0	40

=== Retiring incumbents ===
There were no Democrats term-limited from their seats.

- Dorothy Hukill, District 14 (retiring, later deceased)
- Jack Latvala, District 16 (term-limited, resigned due to sexual harassment allegations)
- Greg Steube, District 23 (retiring, ran for CD-17)
- Joe Negron, District 25 (term-limited)
- Denise Grimsley, District 26 (retiring, ran for Agricultural Commissioner)
- Rene Garcia, District 36 (term-limited)

=== Districts ===
District	Republican		Democratic		Others		Total	Margin		Result
District	Votes	%	Votes	%	Votes	%	Total	Votes	%	Result
District 2	149,157	75.3	48,979	24.7	-	-	198,136	100,178	50.6	Republican hold
District 4	149,347	63.4	80,598	34.2	5,514	2.3	235,459	68,749	29.2	Republican hold
District 6	-	-	-	-	-	-	-	-	-	Democratic hold
District 8	100,690	49.4	98,692	48.4	4,319	2.1	203,701	1,998	1.0	Republican hold
District 10	147,601	65.0	79,349	35.0	-	-	226,950	68,252	30.1	Republican hold
District 12	172,776	65.3	91,765	34.7	21	0.0	264,562	81,011	30.6	Republican hold
District 14	124,055	56.3	96,161	43.7	-	-	220,216	27,894	12.7	Republican hold
District 16	111,997	52.2	102,407	47.8	-	-	214,404	9,590	4.5	Republican hold
District 18	103,667	49.9	104,078	50.1	-	-	207,745	411	0.2	Democratic gain
District 20	101,021	53.5	87,863	46.5	-	-	188,884	13,158	7.0	Republican hold
District 22	105,575	52.8	94,295	47.2	-	-	199,870	11,280	5.6	Republican hold
District 23	143,346	56.5	110,587	43.4	-	-	253,933	32,759	12.9	Republican gain
District 24	116,415	54.3	98,104	45.7	-	-	214,519	18,311	8.5	Republican hold
District 25	117,056	54.3	98,417	45.7	-	-	215,473	18,639	8.7	Republican gain
District 26	117,979	65.1	63,253	34.9	-	-	181,232	54,726	30.2	Republican hold
District 28	138,293	64.5	73,000	34.5	-	-	211,293	65,293	30.9	Republican hold
District 30	-	-	132,241	99.7	385	0.3	132,626	131,858	99.4	Democratic hold
District 32	-	-	-	-	-	-	-	-	-	Democratic hold
District 34	-	-	124,578	100.0	0	0.0	124,578	124,578	100.0	Democratic hold
District 36	66,361	54.1	56,395	45.9	-	-	122,756	9,966	8.1	Republican hold
District 38	-	-	-	-	-	-	-	-	-	Democratic hold
District 40	79,068	46.5	90,924	53.5	-	-	169,992	11,856	7.0	Democratic hold

=== Closest races ===
Seats where the margin of victory was under 10%:

1. District 18, 0.2% gain
2. District 8, 1%
3. District 16, 4.4%
4. District 22, 5.6%
5. District 40, 7%
6. District 20, 7%
7. District 36, 8.2%
8. District 24, 8.6%
9. District 25, 8.6%

== Predictions ==
Source	Ranking	As of
Governing	Lean R	October 8, 2018

== District 2 ==
District 2 consists of Bay, Holmes, Jackson, Walton, and Washington counties, and part of Okaloosa County. Incumbent George Gainer was re-elected by a margin of 51 percent.

=== Republican primary ===
Incumbent George Gainer won the primary unopposed.

=== Democratic primary ===
Attorney Gigi Gibson won the primary unopposed.

=== General election ===
==== Predictions ====
MCI Maps gave the second district a rating of "Safe GOP".

===== Results =====
General election results
Party	Candidate	Votes	%
Republican	George Gainer (incumbent)	149,157	75.3
Democratic	"Gigi" Gibson	48,979	24.7
Majority		100,178	50.6
Total votes		198,136	100.0

== District 4 ==
District 4 consists of Nassau County and part of Duval County counties. Incumbent Aaron Bean was re-elected by a margin of 29 percent.

=== Republican primary ===
Incumbent Republican Aaron Bean defeated challenger Carlos E. Slay in the Republican primary by a margin of 75 percent.

==== Candidates ====
- Aaron Bean, incumbent Florida senator since 2012
- Carlos E. Slay, former Nassau County tax collector candidate

==== Primary results ====
Republican primary results
Party	Candidate	Votes	%
Republican	Aaron Bean (incumbent)	50,275	87.4
Republican	Carlos E. Slay	7,274	12.6
Majority		43,001	74.7
Total votes		57,549	100.0

=== General election ===
==== Results ====
General election results
Party	Candidate	Votes	%
Republican	Aaron Bean (incumbent)	149,347	63.4
Democratic	Billee Bussard	80,598	34.2
Libertarian	Joanna Liberty Tavares	5,514	2.3
Majority		68,749	29.2
Total votes		235,459	100.0

== District 6 ==
District 6 consists of part of Duval County. Incumbent Audrey Gibson was re-elected unopposed.

== District 8 ==
District 8 consists of Alachua and Putnam counties, and part of Marion County. Incumbent Keith Perry was re-elected by a margin of one percent.

=== General election ===
==== Results ====
General election results
Party	Candidate	Votes	%
Republican	Keith Perry (incumbent)	100,690	49.4
Democratic	Kayser Enneking	98,692	48.4
Independent	Charles E. Goston	4,319	2.1
Majority		1,998	1.0
Total votes		203,701	100.0

== District 10 ==
District 10 consists of Citrus and Hernando counties, and part of Pasco County. Incumbent Wilton Simpson was re-elected by a margin of 30 percent.

=== General election ===
==== Results ====
General election results
Party	Candidate	Votes	%
Republican	Wilton Simpson (incumbent)	147,601	65.0
Democratic	Michael Cottrell	79,349	35.0
Majority		68,252	30.1
Total votes		226,950	100.0

== District 12 ==
District 12 consists of Sumter County, and parts of Lake, and Marion counties. Incumbent Dennis Baxley was re-elected by a margin of 31 percent.

=== General election ===
==== Results ====
General election results
Party	Candidate	Votes	%
Republican	Dennis Baxley (incumbent)	172,776	65.3
Democratic	Gary McKechnie	91,765	34.7
Write-in	Kay Gray	21	0.0
Majority		81,011	30.6
Total votes		264,562	100.0

== District 14 ==
District 14 consists of parts of Brevard and Volusia counties. Incumbent state senator Dorothy Hukill, Republican, died in October 2018 from cervical cancer. As her name was already printed on ballots, votes cast for her were counted for Tom Wright, the Republican nominee, who won the election by a margin of 13 percent.

=== General election ===
==== Results ====
General election results
Party	Candidate	Votes	%
Republican	Tom Wright	124,055	56.3
Democratic	"Mel" Martin	96,161	43.7
Majority		27,894	12.7
Total votes		220,216	100.0

== District 16 ==
District 16 consists of parts of Pasco and Pinellas counties.

=== Republican primary ===
==== Candidates ====
- Ed Hooper, former Florida representative and Deputy Whip from 2006 to 2014
- Leo Karruli, entrepreneur

==== Results ====
General election results
Party	Candidate	Votes	%
Republican	Ed Hooper	35,303	79.4
Republican	Leo Karruli	9,141	20.6
Majority		26,162	58.9
Total votes		44,444	100.0

=== General election ===
==== Results ====
General election results
Party	Candidate	Votes	%
Republican	Ed Hooper	111,997	52.2
Democratic	Amanda Murphy	102,407	47.8
Majority		9,590	4.5
Total votes		214,404	100.0

== District 18 ==
District 18 consists of part of Hillsborough County.

=== General election ===
==== Results ====
General election results
Party	Candidate	Votes	%
Democratic	Janet Cruz	104,078	50.1
Republican	Dana Young (incumbent)	103,667	49.9
Majority		411	0.2
Total votes		207,745	100.0

== District 20 ==
District 20 consists of parts of Hillsborough, Pasco, and Polk counties.

=== Republican primary ===
==== Candidates ====
- Tom Lee, incumbent senator since 2012 and from 1996 to 2006, former senate president from 2004 to 2006
- John Manners Houman, Republican nominee for Florida Senate in 2016

==== Results ====
General election results
Party	Candidate	Votes	%
Republican	Tom Lee (incumbent)	30,397	84.9
Republican	John Manners Houman	5,422	15.1
Majority		13,158	69.7
Total votes		35,819	100.0

=== General election ===
==== Results ====
General election results
Party	Candidate	Votes	%
Republican	Tom Lee (incumbent)	101,021	53.5
Democratic	Kathy Lewis	87,863	46.5
Majority		13,158	7.0
Total votes		188,884	100.0

== District 22 ==
District 22 consists of parts of Lake and Polk counties.

=== General election ===
==== Results ====
General election results
Party	Candidate	Votes	%
Republican	Kelli Stargel (incumbent)	105,575	52.8
Democratic	Bob Doyel	94,295	47.2
Majority		11,280	5.6
Total votes		199,870	100.0

== District 23 ==
District 23 consists of Sarasota County and part of Charlotte County. An election for this district was not scheduled to occur until the 2020 general elections, but a special election was scheduled concurrent with the 2018 general elections due to a vacancy that occurred as a result of the resignation of then-state senator Greg Steube to run for the United States House of Representatives.

=== General election ===
==== Results ====
General election results
Party	Candidate	Votes	%
Republican	Joe Gruters	143,346	56.5
Democratic	Faith Olivia Babis	110,587	43.5
Majority		32,759	12.9
Total votes		253,933	100.0

== District 24 ==
District 24 consists of part of Pinellas County.

=== General election ===
==== Results ====
General election results
Party	Candidate	Votes	%
Republican	Jeff Brandes (incumbent)	116,415	54.3
Democratic	Lindsay Cross	98,104	45.7
Majority		18,311	8.5
Total votes		214,519	100.0

== District 25 ==
District 25 consists of Martin and St. Lucie counties, and part of Palm Beach County. An election for this district was not scheduled to occur until the 2020 general elections, but a special election was scheduled concurrent with the 2018 general elections due to a vacancy that occurred as a result of the resignation of former Senate President Joe Negron.

=== Republican primary ===
==== Candidates ====
- Gayle Harrell, Florida representative since 2012
- Belinda Keiser, former member of Florida Constitution Revision Commission, delegate to the 2016 Republican National Convention

=== General election ===
==== Results ====
General election results
Party	Candidate	Votes	%
Republican	Gayle Harrell	117,056	54.3
Democratic	Robert Levy	98,417	45.7
Majority		18,639	8.7
Total votes		215,473	100.0

== District 26 ==
District 26 consists of DeSoto, Glades, Hardee, Highlands, and Okeechobee counties, and parts of Charlotte, Lee, and Polk counties.

=== General election ===
==== Results ====
General election results
Party	Candidate	Votes	%
Republican	Ben Albritton	117,979	65.1
Democratic	Catherine Price	63,253	34.9
Majority		54,726	30.2
Total votes		181,232	100.0

== District 28 ==
District 28 consists of Collier and Hendry counties, and part of Lee County.

=== General election ===
==== Results ====
General election results
Party	Candidate	Votes	%
Republican	Kathleen Passidomo (incumbent)	138,293	65.5
Democratic	Annisa Karim	73,000	34.5
Majority		65,293	30.9
Total votes		211,293	100.0

== District 30 ==
District 30 consists of part of Palm Beach County.

=== General election ===
==== Results ====
General election results
Party	Candidate	Votes	%
Democratic	Bobby Powell (incumbent)	132,241	99.7
Write-in	Josh Santos	385	0.3
Majority		131,856	99.4
Total votes		132,626	100.0

== District 32 ==
District 32 consists of part of Broward County. Incumbent Lauren Book was elected unposed both in the primary and general election.

== District 34 ==
District 34 consists of part of Broward County.

=== General election ===
==== Results ====
General election results
Party	Candidate	Votes	%
Democratic	Gary Farmer (incumbent)	124,578	100.0
Write-in	Richard Hal Sturm	0	0.0
Majority		124,578	100.0
Total votes		124,578	100.0

== District 36 ==
District 36 consists of part of Miami-Dade County.

=== General election ===
==== Results ====
General election results
Party	Candidate	Votes	%
Republican	Manny Díaz Jr.	66,361	54.1
Democratic	David Perez	56,395	45.9
Majority		9,966	8.1
Total votes		122,756	100.0

== District 38 ==
District 38 consists of part of Miami-Dade County. Democrat Jason Pizzo beat incumbent Daphne Campbell in the Democratic primary, 54%-46%. The general election was cancelled, meaning Pizzo was the victor of the race.

== District 40 ==
District 40 consists of part of Miami-Dade County.

=== General election ===
==== Results ====
General election results
Party	Candidate	Votes	%
Democratic	Annette Taddeo (incumbent)	90,924	53.5
Republican	Marili Cancio	79,068	46.5
Majority		11,856	7.0
Total votes		169,992	100.0
