= John E. Proctor =

American politician (1844–1944)

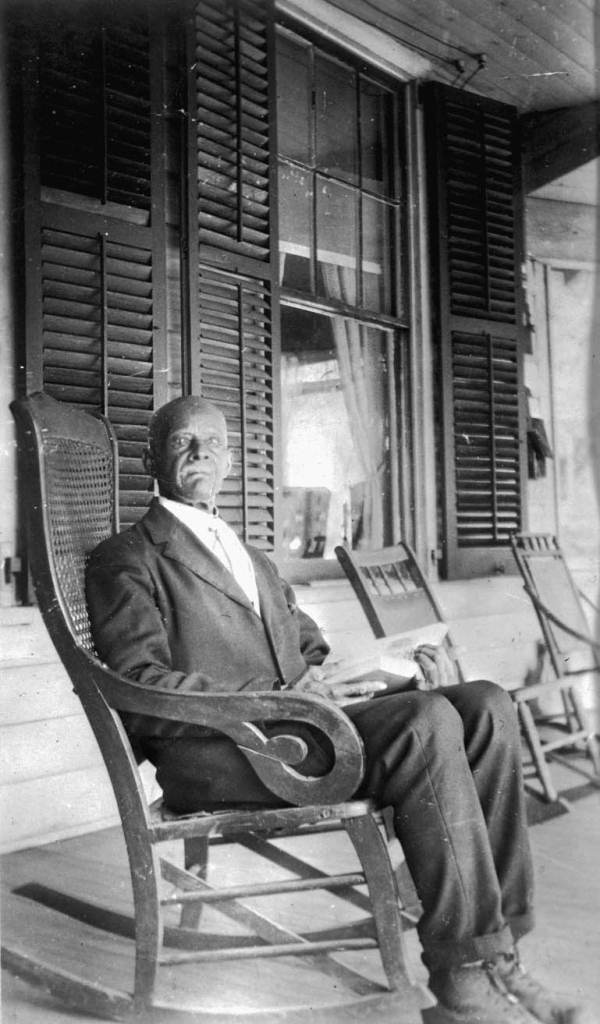

Member of the Florida Senate from the 8th district
- In office 1883–1885

Member of the Florida House of Representatives from the Leon County district
- In office 1873–1875; 1879–1881

Personal details
- Born: January 14, 1844
- Died: December 14, 1944 (aged 100)
- Party: Republican

John Elijah Proctor (January 14, 1844 – December 14, 1944) was an American politician in the state of Florida. A former slave, he served in the Florida House of Representatives from 1873 to 1875, and 1879 to 1881, and in the Florida Senate from 1883 to 1885. Though he was born free, he was sold into slavery at a young age to family friends to pay off debts that his father had incurred purchasing an enslaved woman who became his wife.

== See also ==
- African American officeholders from the end of the Civil War until before 1900
