= Wilson Carraway =

American politician

F. Wilson Carraway
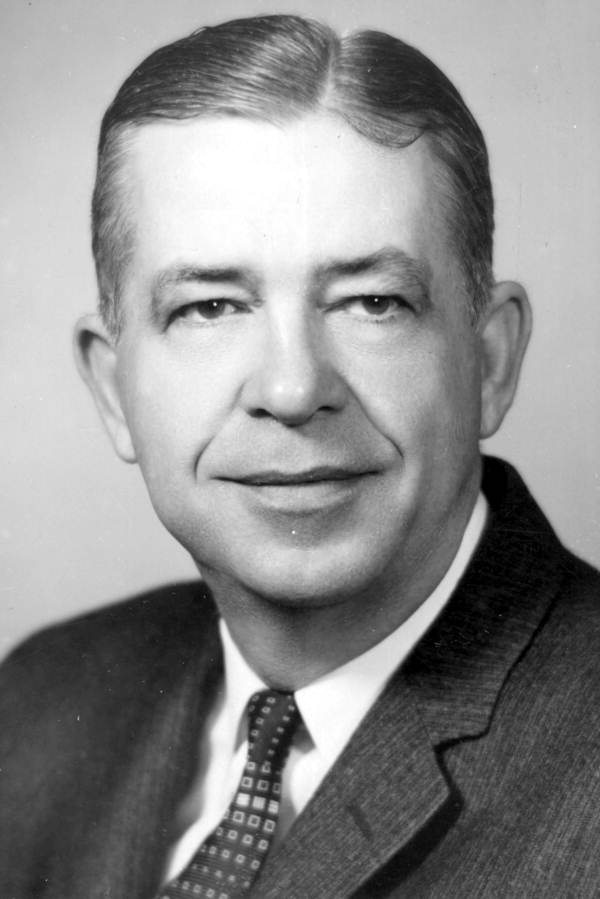

Member of the Florida Senate from the 8th district
- In office 1954–1966
- Preceded by: LeRoy Collins

Member of the Florida House of Representatives
- In office 1945–1950

Personal details
- Born: Franklin Wilson Carraway; October 16, 1904 Tallahassee, Florida, U.S.
- Died: November 7, 1972 (aged 68) Leon County, Florida, U.S.
- Party: Democratic
- Spouse: Caroline Stephens Lively
- Occupation: bank president

Franklin Wilson Carraway (October 16, 1904 – November 7, 1972) was an American politician in the state of Florida.

He served in the Florida State Senate from 1955 to 1965 as a Democratic member for the 8th district. From 1962 to 1963, he was president of the Senate. He also served briefly in the Florida House of Representatives, from 1945 to 1950. He was a member of the Pork Chop Gang, a group of legislators from rural areas that dominated the state legislature due to malapportionment and used their power to engage in McCarthyist tactics.
