= List of Florida state legislatures =

The legislature of the U.S. state of Florida has convened many times since statehood became effective on March 3, 1845.

== Legislatures ==
Name	Start date	End date	Last election
Florida Constitution of 1838
?	1845		
Florida Constitution of 1861
12th General Assembly	1862	1863	
Florida Constitution of 1868
?			
Florida Constitution of 1885
1887-1888 Florida Legislature			November 1886
1889-1890 Florida Legislature			November 1888
1891-1892 Florida Legislature			November 1890
1893-1894 Florida Legislature			November 1892
1895-1896 Florida Legislature			November 1894
1897-1898 Florida Legislature			November 1896
1899-1900 Florida Legislature	April 1, 1899		November 1898
1901-1902 Florida Legislature	April 1901		November 1900
1903-1904 Florida Legislature	April 1903		November 1902
1905-1906 Florida Legislature	April 1905		November 1904
1907-1908 Florida Legislature	April 1907		November 1906
1909-1910 Florida Legislature	April 1909		November 1908
1911-1912 Florida Legislature	April 1911		November 1910
1913-1914 Florida Legislature	April 1913		November 1912
1915-1916 Florida Legislature	April 1915		November 1914
1917-1918 Florida Legislature	April 1917		November 1916
1919-1920 Florida Legislature	April 1919		November 1918
1921-1922 Florida Legislature	April 1921		November 1920
1923-1924 Florida Legislature	April 1923		November 1922
1925-1926 Florida Legislature	April 1925		November 1924
1927-1928 Florida Legislature	April 1927		November 1926
1929-1930 Florida Legislature	April 1929		November 1928
1931-1932 Florida Legislature	April 1931		November 1930
1933-1934 Florida Legislature	April 1933		November 1932
1935-1936 Florida Legislature	April 1935		November 1934
1937-1938 Florida Legislature	April 1937		November 1936
1939-1940 Florida Legislature	April 1939		November 1938
1941-1942 Florida Legislature	April 1941		November 1940
1943-1944 Florida Legislature	April 1943		November 1942
1945-1946 Florida Legislature	April 1945		November 1944
1947-1948 Florida Legislature	April 1947		November 1946
1949-1950 Florida Legislature	April 1949		November 1948
1951-1952 Florida Legislature	April 1951		November 1950
1953-1954 Florida Legislature	April 1953		November 1952
1955-1956 Florida Legislature	April 1955		November 1954
1957-1958 Florida Legislature	April 1957		November 1956
1959-1960 Florida Legislature	April 1959		November 1958
1961-1962 Florida Legislature	April 1961		November 1960
1963-1964 Florida Legislature	April 1963		November 1962
1965-1966 Florida Legislature	April 1965		November 1964
1967-1968 Florida Legislature	April 1967		November 1966
Florida Constitution of 1968
1969-1970 Florida Legislature	April 1969		November 1968
1971-1972 Florida Legislature	April 1971		November 1970
1973-1974 Florida Legislature	April 1973		November 1972
1975-1976 Florida Legislature	April 1975		November 1974
1977-1978 Florida Legislature	April 1977		November 1976
1979-1980 Florida Legislature	April 1979		November 1978
1981-1982 Florida Legislature	April 1981		November 1980
1983-1984 Florida Legislature	April 1983		November 1982
1985-1986 Florida Legislature	April 1985		November 1984
1987-1988 Florida Legislature	April 1987		November 1986
1989-1990 Florida Legislature	April 1989		November 1988
1991-1992 Florida Legislature	March 1991		November 1990
1993-1994 Florida Legislature	March 1993		November 1992
1995-1996 Florida Legislature	March 1995		November 1994
1997-1998 Florida Legislature	March 1997		November 1996
1999-2000 Florida Legislature	March 1999		November 1998
2001-2002 Florida Legislature	March 2001		November 2000
2003-2004 Florida Legislature	March 2003		November 2002
2005-2006 Florida Legislature	March 2005		November 2004
2007-2008 Florida Legislature	March 2007		November 2006
2009-2010 Florida Legislature	March 2009		November 2008
2011-2012 Florida Legislature	March 2011		November 2010
2013-2014 Florida Legislature	March 2013		November 2012: House
2015-2016 Florida Legislature	March 2015		November 2014: House
2017-2018 Florida Legislature	March 2017		November 2016: House
2019-2020 Florida Legislature	March 2019		November 2018: House, Senate
2021-2022 Florida Legislature	March 2021		November 2020: House, Senate
2023-2024 Florida Legislature	March 2023		November 2022: House, Senate
2025-2026 Florida Legislature	March 2025		November 2024: House, Senate

== See also ==
- List of speakers of the Florida House of Representatives
- List of presidents of the Florida Senate
- List of governors of Florida
- Florida State Capitol
- Timeline of Florida history
- Lists of United States state legislative sessions
