= Fentrice Driskell =

American politician (born 1979)

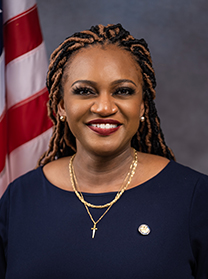

Member of the Florida Senate from the 16th district
- Incumbent
- Assumed office November 3, 2026
- Preceded by: Darryl Rouson

Minority Leader of the Florida House of Representatives
- In office November 22, 2022 – November 3, 2026
- Preceded by: Evan Jenne
- Succeeded by: Christine Hunschofsky

Member of the Florida House of Representatives
- In office November 6, 2018 – November 3, 2026
- Preceded by: Shawn Harrison
- Constituency: 63rd district (2018–2022); 67th district (2022–2026)

Personal details
- Born: March 3, 1979 (age 47) Winter Haven, Florida, U.S.
- Party: Democratic
- Education: Harvard University (BA); Georgetown University (JD)
- Website: State House website

Fentrice DeNell Driskell (born March 3, 1979) is an American attorney and politician serving as a member of the Florida Senate from the 16th district in Hillsborough County since 2026. A member of the Democratic Party, she previously served as a member of the Florida House of Representatives from 2018 to 2026, and was the House Democratic leader from 2022 to 2026.

Driskell worked as of counsel at the law firm of Carlton Fields, and is presently a partner at Swope, Rodante, Newsome & Steinberg.

== Early life, education, and career ==
Driskell was born in Winter Haven, Florida to African-American parents. Driskell earned her Bachelor of Arts from Harvard University and her Juris Doctor from the Georgetown University Law Center. After law school, Driskell was a clerk for Judge Anne C. Conway of the U.S. District Court for the Middle District of Florida. Fentrice also was an intern for Andrew J. Peck, magistrate judge of the U.S. District Court for the Southern District of New York.

== Florida House of Representatives (2018–present) ==
=== Election ===
Driskell was elected in the general election on November 6, 2018, winning 53 percent of the vote over 47 percent for incumbent Republican candidate Shawn Harrison.

=== Tenure ===
In April 2021, Driskell supported bipartisan police reform efforts in the Florida House, notably advocating for HB 7051, which aimed to increase accountability and transparency in law enforcement practices.

In April 2022, Driskell argued that the bill to repeal the Reedy Creek Improvement Act would impose tax burdens on Orange and Osceola counties in the "billions of dollars".

On April 21, 2022, Driskell attempted to stage a sit-in demonstration to prevent a vote on proposed changes to the Florida congressional district maps that included dismantling of her district. The attempted demonstration was unsuccessful in preventing the proposed redistricting.

In February 2023, Driskell sponsored HB 49, a bill establishing the Historic Cemeteries Program and Advisory Council within the Florida Department of State to support the identification, preservation, and maintenance of abandoned and historic cemeteries, particularly African American sites. The bill included a $1 million appropriation for research and grants, and passed all committee stops with strong bipartisan support.

In December 2024, Driskell actively pushed for Medicaid expansion and the implementation of the Florida KidCare program, publicly urging Governor Ron DeSantis and state agencies to provide affordable health care to more children and families. She has written formal letters demanding action, criticized state delays as irresponsible, and called for dropping lawsuits that restrict continuous coverage for children, emphasizing the need to protect vulnerable Floridians.

In March 2025, Driskell criticized proposals to eliminate property taxes in Florida, arguing that such measures would harm local communities by reducing funding for essential public services like schools, police, and fire departments. She contends that shifting the tax burden onto local governments would force cuts to vital services, highlighting her opposition to policies she views as detrimental to Floridians.

=== House Democratic Policy Chair ===
Driskell served as the Florida House Democratic Policy Chair for the 2020–2022 term.

=== House Democratic Caucus Leader ===
Driskell became the leader of the Florida House Democratic Caucus in 2022. She was unanimously re-elected as leader for the 2024–2026 term. She was the first black woman to serve in this role. In November 2024, Driskell was reconfirmed as Leader of the Florida House Democrats, making her the first House member elected to serve consecutive leadership terms since 1992.

== Florida Senate ==
In August 2026, Driskell defeated Michele Rayner in the Democratic primary for the 16th district of the Florida Senate. Facing no opposition in the 2026 general election, Driskell was elected unopposed, succeeding Darryl Rouson.

Florida House of Representatives
Preceded by Evan Jenne	Minority Leader of the Florida House of Representatives; 2022–present	Incumbent
