= Jake Johansson =

American politician

Member of the Florida Senate from the 8th district
- Incumbent
- Assumed office November 3, 2026
- Preceded by: Tom Wright

Personal details
- Party: Republican

Jake Johansson is an American politician. A member of the Republican Party, he has served in the Florida Senate since 2026, representing the 8th district.
