= Brian Nathan =

American politician

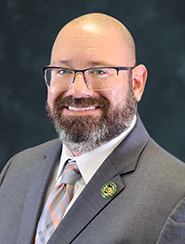

Member of the Florida Senate from the 14th district
- Incumbent
- Assumed office March 24, 2026
- Preceded by: Jay Collins

Personal details
- Party: Democratic
- Education: Hillsborough Community College; University of Tampa (BA)
- Website: Campaign website

Military service
- Branch/service: United States Navy
- Years of service: 2003–2008

Brian Nathan is an American Navy veteran, labor leader, and politician who has served in the Florida Senate since March 2026, representing the 14th district in Hillsborough County. He succeeded Jay Collins after Governor Ron DeSantis appointed the former as Lieutenant Governor of Florida. He narrowly defeated Josie Tomkow in the special election. Nathan will be running against Tomkow again to retain the seat in the November general election.

== Career Information and Advocacy ==
Senator Brian Nathan was a petty officer in the US Navy. It is there that he got his start with electrical work as an electronics specialist in cryptology, a security operation, where he supported important missions from 2003-2008. He then attended Hillsborough Community College from 2009 - 2010 and from there went to the University of Tampa where he earned his BA in Sociology and Philosophy and graduated Cum Laude.

After leaving the Navy, Brian Nathan joined the IBEW in 2008 and went through the IBEW 915 JATC apprenticeship program from 2016 - 2019, to complete his training. While working as an electrician and foreman, he has been dedicated to advocacy for Unions and workers throughout the state of Florida.

More recently, he became part of the AFL-CIO's Working Families Lobby Corps. This is a program that brings Union Members and activists for worker's rights to Tallahassee during the legislative session to attend committee meetings, meet with representatives and senators, and advocate for worker's rights. It is here where Senator Nathan says that he gained the experience and drive to run for office and fight for the people back home. He filed to run for Senate District 14 in August of 2025 and was quickly endorsed and supported by labor and veterans organizations.

== 2026 Special Election ==
In August 2025 Jay Collins was appointed to be the Lieutenant Governor of Florida, which triggered a Special Election for Senate District 14. It wasn't until over a month later (October 2026) Governor Ron DeSantis scheduled the primary for January of 2026 and the Special Election for March 24, 2026. This delay was unusual as in more than 25 other instances, elections for vacant seats were called in fewer than 5 days. The ACLU of Florida filed a lawsuit because the district would not be represented in the 2026 Legislative Session, which was set to conclude more than a week prior to the election.

When the election was held, Democrat Brian Nathan beat out Republican Josie Tomkow by a narrow margin. Nathan won 50.26% (40,245 votes) while Tomkow won 49.74% (39,836) votes, giving Nathan the seat.

Brian Nathan is back on the ballot for the 2026 November General Election. He is once again up against Josie Tomkow. Senator Brian Nathan is running on a working families agenda. As a Navy Veteran and Union Leader, he states that he "understands what it is like to show up, do the work, and have his neighbor's back." That is why one of his priorities is bringing in and safeguarding good paying jobs that have protections and benefits, so that families can thrive. As Creative Loafing Tampa Bay notes: Nathan was an advocate for workers and worker's rights when he supported an International Worker's Day protest in May of 2025. And Brian Nathan State Senate District 14 has committed to continuing to be that advocate for workers by prioritizing policies in the State Senate to do just that.

Senator Brian Nathan also seeks to address the affordability issues that have hit Floridians hard causing middle-class residents to leave the state. Senator Nathan's position is that housing needs to be more affordable and insurance and utilities companies need to be accountable to lower costs. His agenda was looked on favorably by his constiuents and groups like the West Central Florida Labor Council, which endorsed him for the election.

Other issues that Senator Nathan would like to invest resources into is fully funding our schools, keeping corporate polluters out of Tampa to keep the area healthy and clean, strengthening small businesses, and making healthcare more accessible and transparent.

Once again, he faces off against Republican Josie Tomkow. Tomkow is running on experience and her connections to the agriculture community, as her stated occupation is cattle rancher. The election takes place Tuesday, November 3rd 2026.
