= J. J. Grow =

American politician from Florida

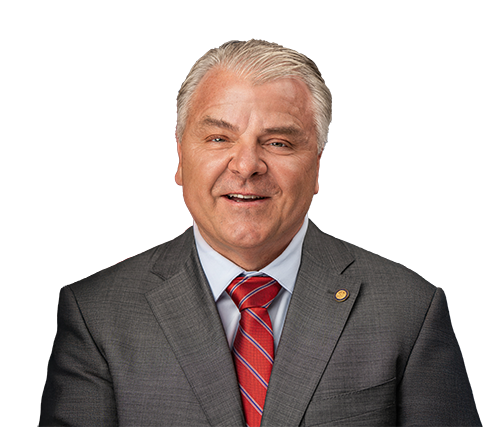
- Official portrait, c. 2024

Member of the Florida House of Representatives from the 23rd district
- Incumbent
- Assumed office November 5, 2024
- Preceded by: Ralph Massullo

Personal details
- Born: July 25, 1968 (age 58)
- Party: Republican
- Spouse: Jen Grow
- Children: 4
- Education: University of Florida (BS)
- Website: Official website

J. J. Grow (born July 25, 1968) is an American businessman and politician serving as a Republican member of the Florida House of Representatives since 2024.

== Early life and career ==
Grow was born on July 25, 1968. In 1992, he graduated from the University of Florida with a bachelor's degree in agriculture.

== Florida House of Representatives ==
In 2022, Grow ran for the Florida House of Representatives from the newly drawn 23rd district, but withdrew his candidacy and endorsed Ralph Massullo.

In 2024, Grow ran for the seat again, defeating Democratic nominee Judith Vowels with 74% of the vote. He was sworn into office on November 19, 2024; representing Citrus County and southwestern parts of Marion County.

== Personal life ==
Grow is a religious Christian. He is married to his wife, Jen; they have four daughters and three grandchildren. Grow and his wife reside in Citrus County, Florida.

Florida House of Representatives
Preceded by Ralph Massullo	Member of the Florida House of Representatives from the 23rd district 2024–present	Incumbent
