= Florida's 23rd House of Representatives district =

American legislative district

Florida's 23rd State House of Representatives district
Representative
J.J. Grow; R–Lecanto

Florida's 23rd House of Representatives district elects one member of the Florida House of Representatives. It covers Citrus County and part of Marion County.

== Members ==
- Ralph Massullo (2022–2024)
- J.J. Grow (since 2024)
