= Dorothy Hukill =

American politician (1946–2018)

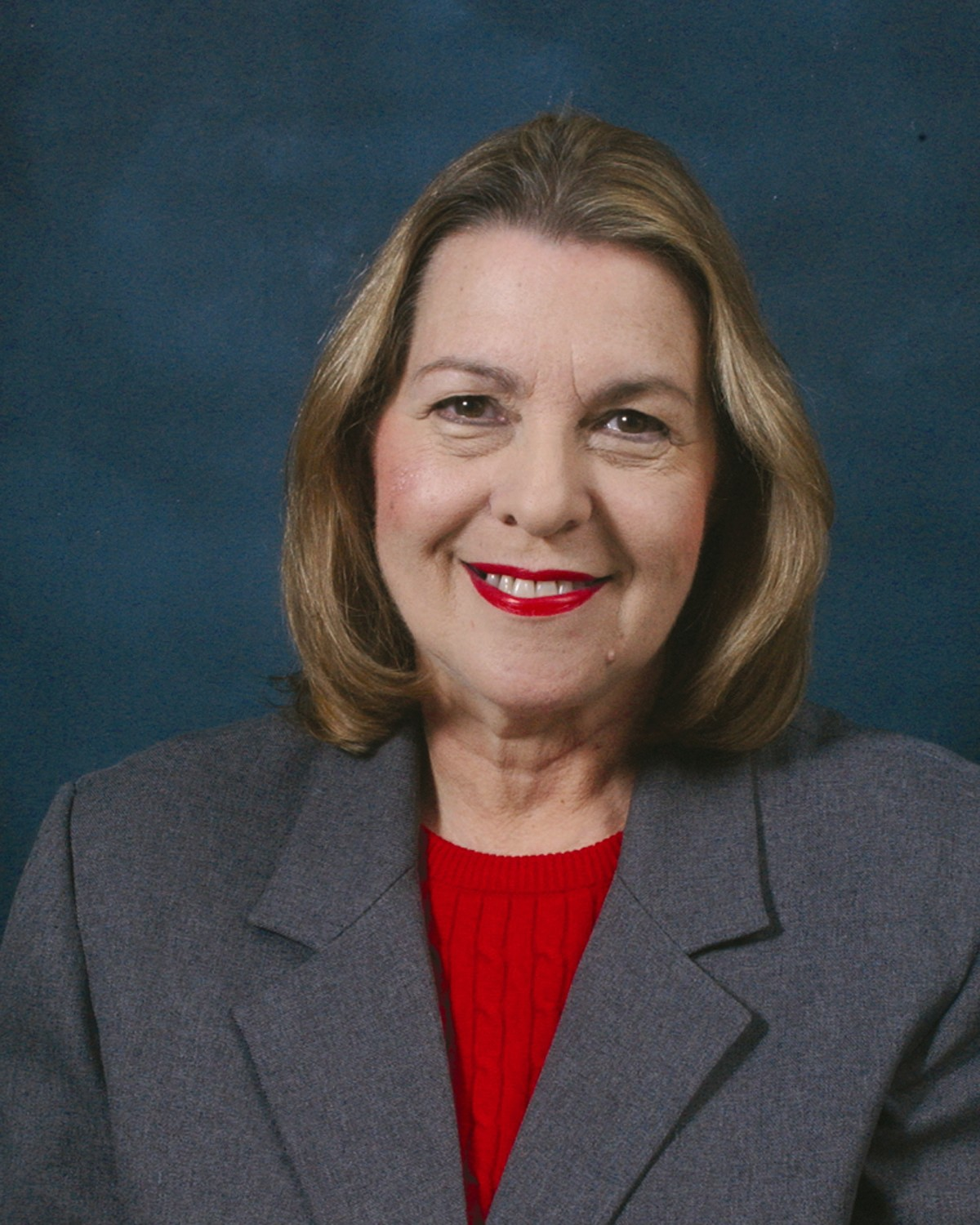
- Official portrait, 2007

Member of the Florida Senate
- In office November 6, 2012 – October 2, 2018
- Preceded by: Redistricted
- Succeeded by: Tom Wright
- Constituency: 8th district (2012–2016); 14th district (2016–2018)

Member of the Florida House of Representatives from the 28th district
- In office November 2, 2004 – November 6, 2012
- Preceded by: Suzanne Kosmas
- Succeeded by: Jason Brodeur

Personal details
- Born: September 20, 1946 New York City, New York, U.S.
- Died: October 2, 2018 (aged 72) Port Orange, Florida, U.S.
- Party: Republican
- Education: Hunter College (BA); Columbia University (BA); St. John's University School of Law (JD)
- Profession: Attorney, teacher

Dorothy L. Hukill (September 20, 1946 – October 2, 2018) was an American politician who was a Republican member in the Florida Senate who represented parts of the Volusia County area from 2012 until her death in 2018. She represented the 14th district, encompassing southern Volusia and northern Brevard Counties, since 2016, after being redistricted from the 8th district, which included parts of Volusia, Lake, and Marion Counties. She also served in the Florida House of Representatives, representing the 28th district in southern Volusia from 2004 to 2012.

== Biography ==
Hukill was born in New York City, New York, and attended Hunter College, which is part of the City University of New York system, where she graduated with her bachelor's degree in 1967. She later attended Columbia University, graduating with her master's degree in 1970, and graduated from the St. John's University School of Law in 1978 and began practicing law. In 1988, Hukill moved to Florida, initially settling in Ponce Inlet, where she served as a Councilwoman from 1992 to 1994. She later moved to Port Orange, serving as its Vice Mayor from 1998 to 2000 and its Mayor from 2000 to 2004.

== Florida Legislature ==
=== Florida House of Representatives ===
In 2004, when incumbent Democratic State Representative Suzanne Kosmas was unable to seek an additional term in the House due to term limits, Hukill ran to succeed her in the 28th District, which stretched from Oak Hill to Ponce Inlet in southern Volusia County. She won the Republican primary uncontested, and advanced to the general election, where she faced Jim Ward, the Democratic nominee and, like Hukill, a former Mayor of Port Orange, and independent candidate Richard Paul Dembinsky. The Orlando Sentinel praised both candidates as "intelligent and experienced," but ultimately endorsed Hukill over Ward, praising her "blunt and assertive 'get-it-done' style." Ultimately, she narrowly defeated Ward, winning 51% of the vote to his 47% and Dembinsky's 2%. Running for re-election in 2006, Hukill was challenged by William Smalley, the Democratic nominee. She campaigned on her record in the legislature of creating a solar energy program that "awards grants for residential and business solar-energy systems," and pledged to expand the program to attract manufacturers to the state in her second term. Hukill managed to increase her margin of victory, scoring 57% of the vote to Smalley's 43%. She faced Smalley once again in 2008, and defeated him handily once again, receiving 62% of the vote to his 38%. Running for her final term in 2010, Hukill was challenged in the Republican primary by Teresa Valdes, who argued that businesses in the state were "overtaxed." The Sentinel endorsed Hukill, whom they praised for her "solid leadership record," over Valdes, whom they criticized for lacking "thoughtfulness." Hukill easily defeated her opponent to win renomination, and won the general election in a landslide against only write-in opposition.

=== Florida Senate ===
In 2012, when Hukill was unable to seek a fifth term in the Florida House of Representatives due to term limits and the state's legislative districts were redrawn, she opted to run for the Florida Senate in the newly created 8th District. She won the Republican primary uncontested, and advanced to the general election, where she faced Frank Bruno, the Chairman of the Volusia County Council and the Democratic nominee. A contentious election ensued, with both Hukill and Bruno raising hundreds of thousands of dollars for their campaigns, and both the Florida Democratic Party and the Republican Party of Florida spending millions of dollars to promote their candidacies, though as the election grew closer, Bruno's supporters declined to expand their advertising on his behalf. The Orlando Sentinel strongly endorsed Bruno over Hukill, criticizing her for serving as "a loyal soldier for House GOP leaders" during her time in the legislature and for sponsoring "some truly bad bills," and for her refusal to condemn what they referred to as a "ridiculous" advertisement featuring actors with "exaggerated Italian-American accents" that portrayed Bruno as Volusia County's "political boss." Ultimately, however, despite the perceived closeness of the race, Hukill overwhelmingly defeated Bruno, receiving 57% of the vote to Bruno's 43%.

While serving in the Senate, Hukill sponsored legislation that would allow manufacturers to "not have to pay a sales tax on equipment purchased in a three-year period beginning in April 2014," declaring, "The single biggest expense manufacturers have is equipment costs." Hukill took a strong stance against legislation that would "collect sales tax when Florida residents make online purchases," voting against it in committee.

Hukill's senate district was reconfigured and renumbered after court-ordered redistricting in 2016.

== Health and death ==
On September 28, 2018, Hukill announced that she would not seek reelection and was entering hospice care due to complications of cervical cancer. She died from the illness on October 2, 2018.

Florida House of Representatives
Preceded by Suzanne Kosmas	Member of the Florida House of Representatives from the 28th district 2004–2012	Succeeded by Jason Brodeur
Florida Senate
Preceded by John E. Thrasher	Member of the Florida Senate from the 8th district 2012–2016	Succeeded by Keith Perry
Preceded by Darren Soto	Member of the Florida Senate from the 14th district 2016–2018	Succeeded by Tom Wright
