= Ralph Massullo =

American politician from Florida

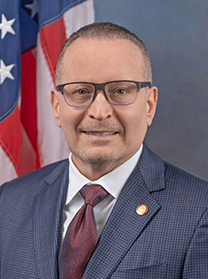

Member of the Florida Senate from the 11th district
- Incumbent
- Assumed office December 9, 2025
- Preceded by: Blaise Ingoglia

Member of the Florida House of Representatives
- In office November 8, 2016 – November 5, 2024
- Preceded by: Jimmie Todd Smith
- Succeeded by: J.J. Grow
- Constituency: 34th district (2016–2022); 23rd district (2022–2024)

Personal details
- Born: December 25, 1956 (age 69) Morgantown, West Virginia, U.S.
- Party: Republican
- Education: West Virginia University
- Occupation: Dermatologist
- Website: https://ralphmassullo.com/

Ralph Massullo is a dermatologist and member of the Florida Senate, representing the 11th district. A Republican, he previously represented the state's 23rd district, in the Florida House of Representatives which includes Citrus County as well as part of Marion County.

== History ==
A practicing dermatologist, Massullo is a native of Morgantown, West Virginia and a graduate of the West Virginia University School of Medicine.

== Florida House of Representatives ==
Massullo was elected to the Florida House without opposition in 2016. In the November 6, 2018 general election, Massullo was re-elected with 69.29% of the vote, defeating Democrat Paul Reinhardt.

Financial disclosure forms submitted in 2020 showed that Massullo was likely the Florida Legislature's wealthiest member, with a net worth of $46.1 million.

== Florida Senate ==
Massullo was elected to the Florida Senate in a December 2025 special election.
