= Florida's 14th Senate district =

American legislative district in Florida

Florida's 14th State Senate district
Senator
Brian Nathan; D

Florida's 14th Senate district elects one member to the Florida State Senate. Since 2022, it contains parts of Hillsborough County.

Until 2022, it contained parts of Brevard County and Volusia County.

== 2026 Election for State Senate District 14 ==
This seat was vacated in 2025 when Jay Collins was appointed by Governor Ron DeSantis as Florida's new Lieutenant Governor. The previous Lieutenant Governor, Jeanette Nunez, took a position at Florida International Univeristy. This triggered a special election in March of 2026 between Democratic Candidate Brian Nathan and Republican Candidate Josie Tomkow. Brian Nathan was victorious by a narrow margin in this race, which was previously a Trump +7 district. Tomkow received 49.74% (39,836) of the votes while Nathan received 50.26% (40,245) of the votes.

Both Tomkow and Nathan are on the ballot again, as the regular mid-term election is underway. State Senate District 14 spans from MacDill Air Force Base in South Tampa all the way to Odessa in northern Hillsborough County and there are about 20,000 more registered Republicans than registered Democrats.

Brian Nathan is a US Navy Veteran, Union Electrician, labor leader, and a family man. He is primarily focused on working families including holding insurance and utility companies accountable to lower costs, fully funding schools and a high quality education for kids, and taking on corporate polluters to protect the resources and environment in Hillsborough County. He knows that property insurance costs are adversely affecting budgets of individuals and families and that loopholes and bailouts need to end. He also identifies that overdevelopment has hamstrung infrastructure of municipalities and believes that state funding and coordination with local governments should work to ensure that physical infrastructure outpaces population growth and that there is careful planning with development. His full working families agenda can be found on his campaign website.

Josie Tomkow is running on experience, as she previously represented Florida in House Districts 39 and 51. In addition, she touts her families connection to cattle ranching and the agriculture industry as a connection in which she can champion the rights and needs of farmers. She is in full support of local law enforcement working with Federal enforcement for immigration efforts and is supported by local law enforcement.

== 2026 Election Controversy State Senate District 14 ==
Florida's election for State Senate District 14 has had some controversy, as there have been attacks from the Tomkow campaign towards the Nathan campaign. Tomkow's campaign has accused Nathan of being a socialist and aligning himself with socialist organizations. These connections have been noted to be quite vague because he has a centerist, moderate Democrat platform and the organization that is being named as socialist (Florida Rising) merely focuses on helping marginalized communities get politically active. In addition, Republicans lodging claims against their opposition and labeling them as socialist or communist, has been a nationwide trend and Republican leadership has advised candidates to use the moniker to attempt to brand their opponents as extremists. He also went out to support May Day and rally for Unions and worker's rights, which the Republicans have also tried to spin to cast Nathan in a bad light. So questions about Brian Nathan for State Senate District 14 and his connections to socialism have presented themselves as an overarching Republican theme, rather than an accusation that holds any weight.

Josie Tomkow for State Senate District 14 has been called into question about her connection to private insurance companies and other corporate donors. Her contributions from corporate entities have totaled around $350,000, while Nathan's campaign has relied heavily on individual contributions and contributions from the Democratic party itself. This has called into question whether she will actually support and pass legislation that provides relief from the insurance industry, which is crushing Floridians. Or is Josie Tomkow will support and pass legislation that protects Floridians from rate hikes and the resource theft and environmental damage that AI Data Centers cause. Two instances where she voted on legislation that favored Insurance Companies, rather than the people of Florida are HB7065 and SB76. Both of these bills made it more restrictive for people to pursue claims agains insurance companies that didn't pay out for damages when they held existing policies. They also shifted the financial responsibility of pursuing such claims onto the people, even if they were successful in their lawsuit. Insurance companies argue that these bills curbed fraud and lawsuit abuses. In addition, despite her agricultural connections, her voting record shows that she did not take into consideration the needs of the agriculture community. She failed to protect farm workers by supporting HB 433, which limited heat protections for workers. She limited the authority of local governments to pursue greater protections for the environment with access to more alternative energy sources and rather, protected the fossil fuel industry.

For the upcoming election of State Senate District 14 questions remain as to whether Florida's Republican Party doesn't really have much to go on when it comes to opposition against Brian Nathan, or if people will buy into the socialist and communist rhetoric. And it remains to be seen if Josie Tomkow will support Floridians or provide benefits to companies that have seemingly paid for the privilege of access. Early voting is taking place until Sunday, November 1st and there are 27 early voting locations that any registered voter can access. Election Day is Tuesday, November 3rd and people can use the Hillsborough County Supervisor of Elections website as registered voters must go to their assigned precinct. For both early voting and election day, the hours are 7am - 7pm.

== Members ==
Portrait	Name	Party	Years of service	Home city	Map	Notes
	Darren Soto	Democratic	2012–2016			
	Dorothy Hukill	Republican	2016–2018	New York City, New York		
	Tom Wright	Republican	2018–2022			
	Jay Collins	Republican	2022–2025	Scobey, Montana		
	Brian Nathan	Democratic	2026–present			
