= Jay Collins =

American politician (born 1976)

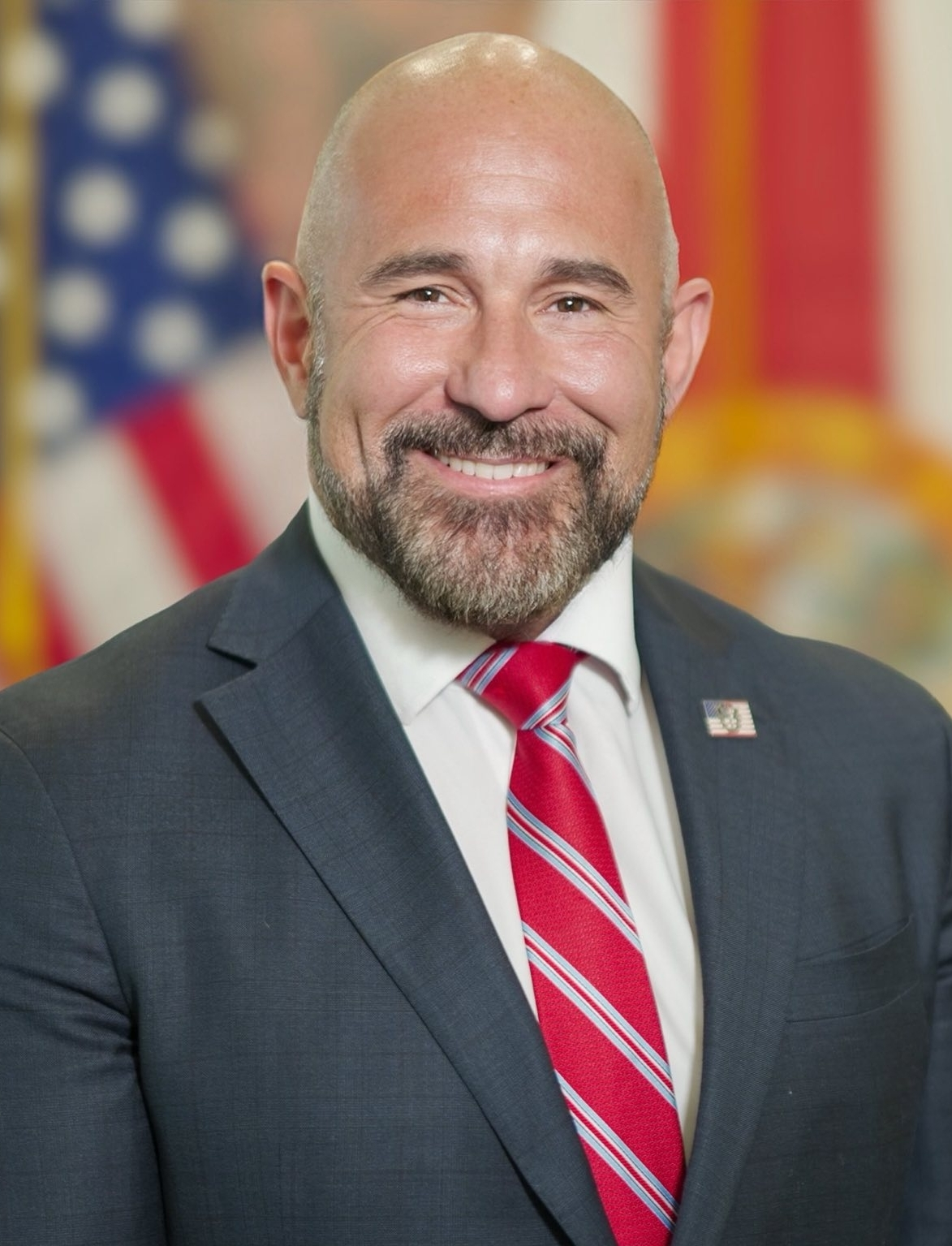
- Official portrait, 2025

21st Lieutenant Governor of Florida
- Incumbent
- Assumed office August 12, 2025
- Governor: Ron DeSantis
- Preceded by: Jeanette Nuñez

Member of the Florida Senate from the 14th district
- In office November 8, 2022 – August 12, 2025
- Preceded by: Janet Cruz
- Succeeded by: Brian Nathan

Personal details
- Born: Jarrid Collins; April 28, 1976 (age 50) Scobey, Montana, U.S.
- Party: Republican
- Spouse(s): Colleen Madsen (m. 1997, divorced) Layla Collins (m. 2000)
- Children: 3
- Education: American Military University (BS); Norwich University (MS)

Military service
- Branch/service: United States Army
- Years of service: 1995–2018
- Rank: First sergeant
- Unit: U.S. Army Special Forces
- Awards: Legion of Merit; Soldier's Medal; Bronze Star; Purple Heart; Meritorious Service Medal

Jarrid Collins (born April 28, 1976) is an American politician and Army veteran who has served as the 21st lieutenant governor of Florida since August 2025. A member of the Republican Party, he served as a member of the Florida Senate from 2022 until his resignation in 2025.

Born and raised in Montana, Collins served in Army Special Forces for over 20 years. In 2018, he moved to Florida to raise his family and was elected to the Florida Senate in 2022. During his tenure in the state senate, he was a staunch ally of Governor Ron DeSantis. In August 2025, he was appointed as lieutenant governor, succeeding Jeanette Nuñez.

== Early life, education and military service ==
Collins was born in Scobey, Montana. He earned a Bachelor of Science degree in health sciences and pre-medicine from American Military University, and a Master of Science in organizational leadership from Norwich University.

Collins served in the United States Army from 1995 to 2018, including as member of the United States Army Special Forces. During his career, he was assigned to the United States Army Special Operations Command, Special Warfare Medical Group, 7th Special Forces Group, and 1st Special Forces Group.

As a Green Beret medic, Collins deployed to Afghanistan, Iraq, and twice to South America. During his 2007 Afghanistan deployment, he was shot in the arm and helped perform surgery on himself in the field of battle. A few months later, he sustained injuries that would eventually lead to the amputation of his leg years later. Following his amputation, Collins re-qualified as a fully deployable Green Beret and served over five more years on active duty. He retired from the U.S. Army at the rank of first sergeant.

His military awards and decorations include the Legion of Merit, Soldier's Medal, Bronze Star Medal, Purple Heart, Meritorious Service Medal, Combat Infantryman Badge, Master Parachutist Badge, Military Freefall Parachutist Badge, and numerous other personal, unit, and service awards. He is also a recipient of the U.S. Army Special Operations Command's Major General John K. Singlaub/Jedburgh Award.

== Political career ==
=== 2022 U.S House campaigns ===
In July 2021, Collins announced his candidacy for the U.S. Congress, challenging incumbent Democratic congresswoman Kathy Castor for Florida's 14th congressional district. In May 2022, he withdrew from the race and re-filed his campaign to run in the newly drawn 15th congressional district. After Laurel Lee announced her candidacy for the 15th district, Collins dropped out of the race for Congress and announced his candidacy for state senate in June 2022.

=== Florida Senate (2022–2025) ===
After announcing his candidacy for Florida's 14th Senate district, Collins received the endorsement of Governor Ron DeSantis and was unopposed in the Republican primary. In November 2022, Collins was elected to the Florida Senate after defeating incumbent Democratic state senator Janet Cruz. His district encompassed areas of downtown Tampa, south Tampa, MacDill AFB, and northwestern Hillsborough County.

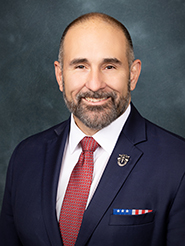
Official state senatorial portrait of Collins, 2022

In 2023, Collins sponsored a senate bill to allow the permitless carry of concealed firearms in Florida. The bill was signed into law by DeSantis.

In March 2023, Collins introduced an amendment that would limit what flags could be displayed by government entities in Florida. The draft was withdrawn after it was noted that the bill would explicitly authorize the flying of the Confederate flag on public properties. Collins released a statement denying he was a "confederate sympathizer" and later claimed he submitted the amendment by mistake. The bill and a similar house bill were also criticized as an attempt to ban government buildings from flying the pride flag, which was not included among the approved flags.

In 2023, Collins voted for the Heartbeat Protection Act; a six-week abortion ban in Florida.

In 2024, Collins introduced a bill to allow telepharmacy in Florida and loosen regulations on pharmacist's ability to dispense prescription drugs, but it failed to pass in committee. That same year, Collins publicly opposed the 2024 Florida Amendment 4 during the 2024 Florida elections. In November 2024, the Floridian Press reported that Collins was considered as a possible replacement for outgoing U.S. senator Marco Rubio, who was nominated by President-elect Donald Trump to serve as United States Secretary of State.

In March 2025, Collins sponsored SB 918, which would change child labor laws to allow 14-17 year-olds to work more than eight hours a day on school nights and over 30 hours a week while school is in session, without mandated breaks.

In 2025, Collins authored and led the effort to pass the "Pam Rock Act"; a bill requiring owners of "dangerous dogs" to register, microchip, spay/neuter their animals, and carry US$100,000 in liability insurance. The bill also mandates that a dog will be euthanized if it leaves a bite mark on a human scoring five or higher on the Dunbar bite scale and allows dogs voluntarily given to the state to be euthanized. It was signed into law by DeSantis in May 2025.

=== Lieutenant Governor of Florida (2025–present) ===
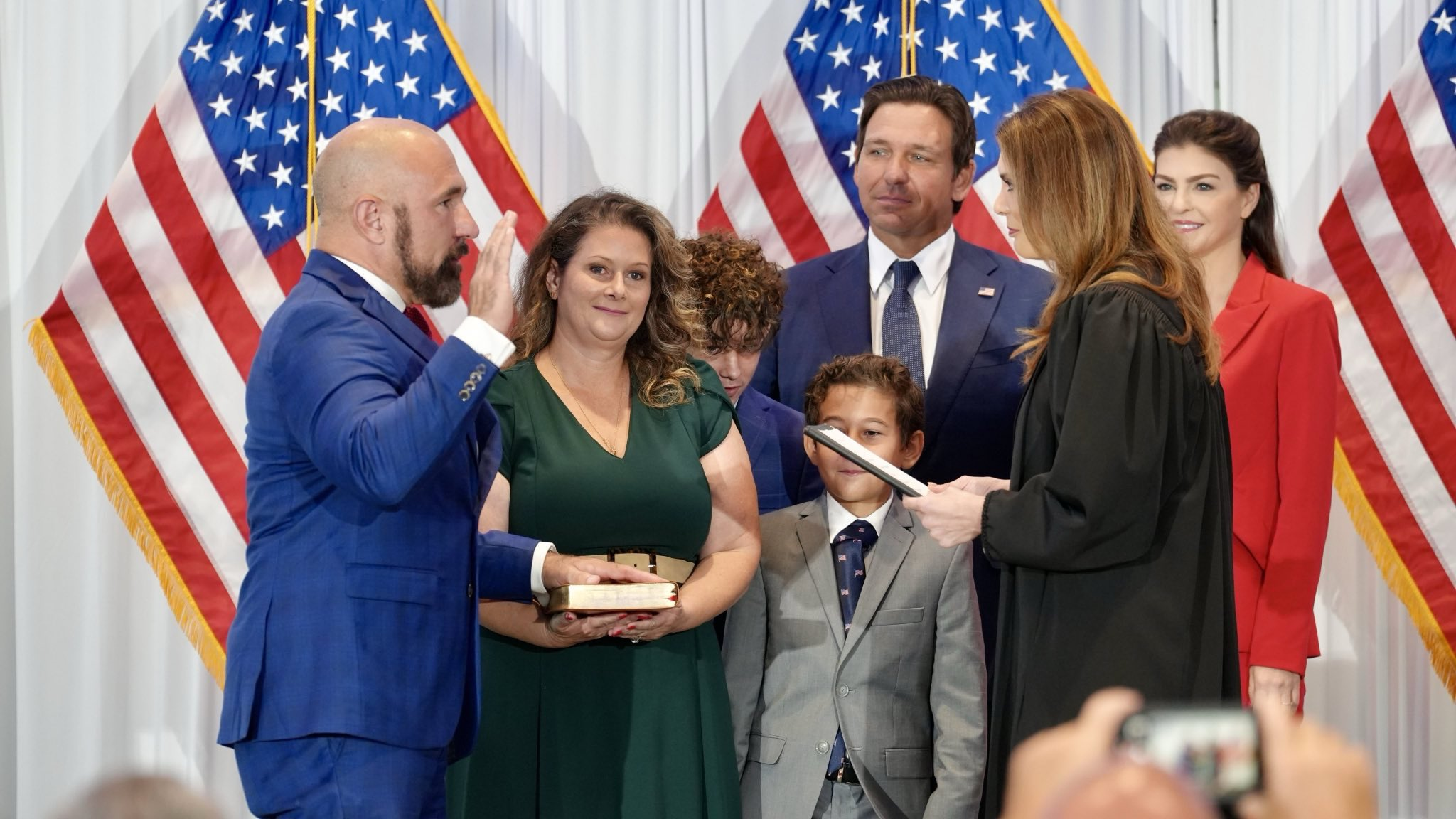
Collins being sworn in by Justice Jamie Grosshans in August 2025

On February 16, 2025, Lieutenant Governor Jeanette Nuñez resigned to become the president of Florida International University. As early as May 2025, press reports predicted Collins as a potential choice to succeed Nuñez. On August 12, 2025, Governor Ron DeSantis appointed Collins as the 21st lieutenant governor of Florida.

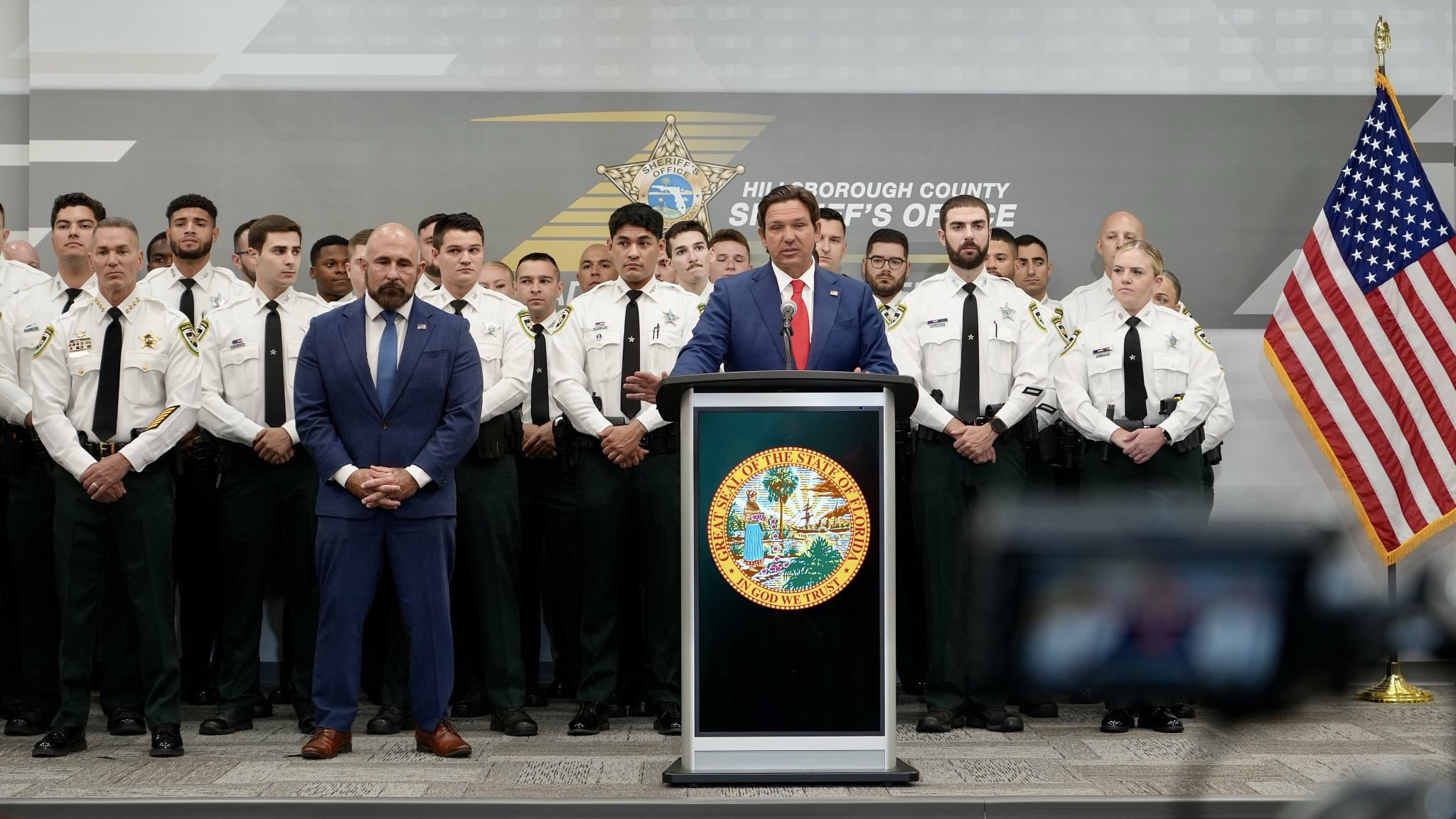
Collins with Governor Ron DeSantis, Sheriff Chad Chronister, and Hillsborough County Sheriff's Office deputies, 2025

Since assuming office, Collins has faced a turbulent tenure as lieutenant governor. In his second week in office, Florida Politics published leaked text messages between Collins and State Representative Alex Andrade revealing they believe Ron DeSantis has autism and has concealed the disorder from the public. Later that week, Collins flew to California to escort an undocumented immigrant back to Florida to face charges for an automobile accident; denying the controversy was "performative" after receiving criticism from state legislators who questioned the legality of the extradition. The week after returning from California, Collins received criticism for his political opposition to diversity, equity, and inclusion while having supported DEI as chief operating officer of Operation BBQ Relief, going so far as mandating yearly DEI training and applying DEI in the selection of contractors and vendors.

=== 2026 gubernatorial campaign ===
After less than one month in office, Collins considered running for Florida's 14th congressional district in 2026, which would have required him to resign as lieutenant governor due to Florida's resign-to-run law, but decided not to run. Instead, he announced he would be running for governor of Florida in 2026.

During the run-up to his announcement as a candidate for governor, Collins clashed with top staffers in the Executive Office of the Governor, including Taryn Fenske, a senior political aide to DeSantis, complaining that they were not providing sufficient assistance to his political efforts, according to Republican operatives familiar with the situation. DeSantis declined to endorsed anyone ahead of the Republican gubernatorial primary election on August 18, 2026. On July 3, 2026, DeSantis aides accused Collins's wife, Layla, of running burner accounts on X which supported Collins's campaign and were critical of DeSantis; the X accounts were subsequently deleted and Layla denied the allegations.

In June 2026, Collins sued fellow Republican gubernatorial candidate James Fishback in Leon County Circuit Court, alleging Fishback failed Florida’s seven-year residency requirement due to voter registration, property ownership, and homestead claims in Washington, D.C. On July 27, 2026, Circuit Judge David Frank rejected the challenge, ruling Collins lacked sufficient evidence that Fishback intended to abandon Florida residency, and ordered Fishback to remain on the ballot.

On August 18, Collins lost his primary bid to Byron Donalds, earning second place. He won over 25% of the popular vote and 17 counties.

== Personal life ==
In 2018, Collins and his family moved to Florida, originally settling in Pasco County. He has two sons with his second wife, Layla, and they live in Tampa. He has an older son from a previous marriage. Layla was an unsuccessful candidate for Hillsborough County school board in 2024, and was appointed to the Florida Board of Education by DeSantis in July 2025.

Political offices
Preceded by Jeanette Nuñez	Lieutenant Governor of Florida; 2025–present	Incumbent
