= Tom Wright (politician) =

American politician

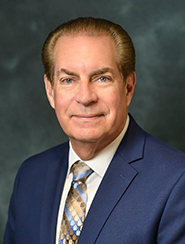
- Official portrait, 2018

Member of the Florida Senate
- Incumbent
- Assumed office November 6, 2018
- Preceded by: Dorothy Hukill
- Succeeded by: Jake Johansson (elect)
- Constituency: 14th district (2018–2022); 8th district (2022–present)

Personal details
- Born: May 16, 1952 (age 74) Algona, Iowa, U.S.
- Party: Republican
- Spouse: Cindy Wright

Tom A. Wright is an American businessman and Republican politician who has served as a member of the Florida Senate since 2018. Wright represents the 8th district, encompassing parts of Brevard and Volusia counties.

== Florida Senate ==
Incumbent Dorothy Hukill died of cervical cancer on October 2, 2018, just over a month before the election. A six-member panel of Republican Party officials from Brevard and Volusia counties selected Wright as Hukill's replacement.

Because ballots for the November 6, 2018 general election had already been printed by the time Wright was named as Hukill's replacement, his name did not appear on the ballot; instead, votes for Hukill were counted as votes for Wright. Wright was elected with 56.33% of the vote, defeating Democrat Melissa "Mel" Martin.

=== Potential resignation ===
On April 6, 2020, Wright resigned from the Florida Senate citing a "staff control dispute," but rescinded his resignation the following week to remain in office.

== Legislation ==
Wright has sponsored legislation concerning veterans and military families, public safety, aerospace, education, and local government. During his first Senate term, his enacted bills included legislation concerning the Interstate Compact on Educational Opportunity for Military Children, crimes targeting veterans, and education-related assistance for military families."Senator Tom A. Wright: 2018–2020". Florida Senate.

In 2021, Wright sponsored Senate Bill 388, which authorized emergency medical technicians and paramedics to provide emergency care to injured police dogs and permitted qualifying emergency vehicles to transport them. The measure became Chapter 2021-119 of the Laws of Florida."Senate Bill 388 (2021): Injured Police Canines". Florida Senate. Other enacted measures sponsored by Wright during the 2021 and 2022 sessions addressed government use of drones, the Interstate Compact on Educational Opportunity for Military Children, the authority of fire investigators, and the Governor’s Medal of Freedom."Senator Tom A. Wright: 2020–2022". Florida Senate.

Wright sponsored legislation establishing the Collegiate Purple Star Campuses program in 2023. The program recognizes colleges and universities that provide specified services and support to military-connected students. He also sponsored Senate Bill 1318, which revised Florida law governing liability for commercial spaceflight entities when participants and crew members acknowledge statutory warnings concerning the risks of spaceflight."Senate Bill 1318 (2023): Spaceflight Entity Liability". Florida Senate. His other enacted legislation during the 2023–2024 term addressed the confidentiality of judicial assistants’ identifying information and membership requirements for citizen volunteer advisory committees."Senator Tom A. Wright: 2022–2024". Florida Senate.

In 2025, Wright sponsored Senate Bill 1516, which created the International Aerospace Innovation Fund within Space Florida to support international aerospace-related research, development, and commercialization projects. The bill passed both chambers without opposition and became Chapter 2025-154."Senate Bill 1516 (2025): Aerospace Industry". Florida Senate. He also sponsored the Senate versions of legislation enacted through House companion bills concerning driving and boating offenses and the electronic transmission of certain court orders."House Bill 687 (2025): Driving and Boating Offenses". Florida Senate."House Bill 513 (2025): Electronic Transmittal of Court Orders". Florida Senate.

During the 2026 session, Wright sponsored Senate Bill 422, which restricted airports from using data collected through automatic dependent surveillance–broadcast systems to calculate or impose certain aircraft fees."Senate Bill 422 (2026): Automatic Dependent Surveillance-broadcasts". Florida Senate. He also sponsored Senate Bill 474, a military-affairs measure addressing military leave—including leave related to Coast Guard service—and provisions of the Florida Retirement System applicable to specified military positions."Senate Bill 474 (2026): Military Affairs". Florida Senate. Senate Bill 1602, also sponsored by Wright, created a pilot program through the Florida Housing Finance Corporation intended to encourage participating property managers to reserve available rental housing for eligible veterans."Senate Bill 1602 (2026): Housing for Veterans". Florida Senate.

== Personal life ==
A native of Iowa, Wright moved to Florida in 2004. He lives in New Smyrna Beach, Florida.
