= Clay Yarborough =

American politician

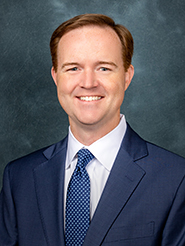

Member of the Florida Senate from the 4th district
- Incumbent
- Assumed office November 8, 2022
- Preceded by: Aaron Bean

Member of the Florida House of Representatives from the 12th district
- In office November 8, 2016 – November 8, 2022
- Preceded by: Lake Ray
- Succeeded by: Wyman Duggan

Member of the Jacksonville City Council from the 1st district
- In office July 1, 2007 – June 30, 2015
- Preceded by: Lake Ray
- Succeeded by: Joyce Morgan

Personal details
- Born: February 6, 1981 (age 45) Mobile, Alabama, U.S.
- Party: Republican

Clay Yarborough (born February 6, 1981) is an American politician who has served in the Florida Senate from the 4th district since 2022. A member of the Republican Party, he served in the Florida House of Representatives from the 12th district from 2016 to 2022 and on the Jacksonville City Council from the 1st district from 2007 to 2015.

== Florida Senate ==
In March 2023, Yarborough introduced Florida Senate Bill 254 into the Florida Senate, which would grant the state of Florida "temporary emergency jurisdiction" over children "subjected to" or "threatened with being subjected to sex-reassignment prescriptions or procedures". The bill was met with strong disapproval from the ACLU, which said it was "designed to silence, harm, and erase trans people in Florida", and would "directly threaten transgender Floridians’ fundamental human rights and safety". The bill passed through the Florida Senate and Florida House of Representatives in April 2023. In 2025, the U.S. Supreme Court upheld Tennessee's similar ban on providing puberty blockers and hormone therapy to treat gender dysphoria in minors.
