= Florida's 8th Senate district =

American legislative district

Florida's 8th State Senate district
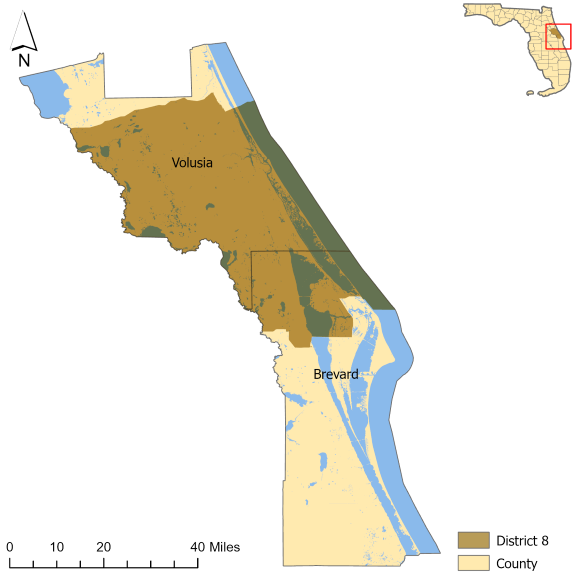
- Interactive map of district boundary since January 3, 2023
Senator
Tom Wright; R–New Smyrna Beach
- Demographics: 68% White; 11% Black; 16% Hispanic; 2% Asian; 3% Multiracial
- Population (2023): 556,251

Florida's 8th Senate district elects one member of the Florida Senate. The district consists of most of Volusia County and part of northern Brevard County, in the U.S. state of Florida. The current senator is Republican Tom Wright.

From 1849 to 1850, the district was represented by Augustus Maxwell, a future Confederate States senator. From 1940 to 1943, and again from 1946 to 1954, the district was represented by future Governor of Florida LeRoy Collins.

Three presidents of the Florida Senate have represented the district: Lew Brantley, Ander Crenshaw, and Jim King.

== List of senators ==
Full list of senators from the 8th district (1845–2006).

Portrait	Name	Party	Years of service	Home city/state	Notes
	Augustus Maxwell	Democratic	1849–1850	Elberton, Georgia	
	Medicus Long		1852–1856	Tennessee	
	David P. Hogue	Whig	1862–1864	Erie, Pennsylvania	
	Charles H. Pearce	Republican	1868–1874	Maryland	Consisted of Leon County
	John Wallace	Republican	1874–1882		
	John E. Proctor	Republican	1882–1884	Leon County, Florida	Consisted of Leon County
	Patrick Houston		1886–1890	Savannah, Georgia	Consisted of Leon County
	George P. Raney	Democratic	1902–1904	Apalachicola, Florida	Consisted of Franklin County
	Dexter Marvin Lowry		1918–1922	Valley Head, Alabama	Consisted of Leon County
	LeRoy Collins	Democratic	1940–1944; 1946–1954	Tallahassee, Florida	
	Wilson Carraway	Democratic	1954–1966	Tallahassee, Florida	
	John Mathews Jr.	Democratic	1966–1970		
	Lew Brantley	Democratic	1970–1978	McRae, Georgia	Consisted of Duval County
	Joe Carlucci	Democratic	1978–1986	Jacksonville, Florida	Consisted of Duval County
	Ander Crenshaw	Republican	1986–1992	Jacksonville, Florida	Consisted of all of Flagler County and parts of Duval, Marion, St. Johns, and Volusia counties
	Bill Bankhead	Republican	1992–1999	Palm Coast, Florida	Consisted of all of Flagler County and parts of Duval, Marion, St. Johns, and Volusia counties
	Jim King	Republican	1999–2009	Brooklyn, New York	Consisted of all of Flagler County and parts of Duval, Nassau, St. Johns, Volusia counties
	John Thrasher	Republican	2009–2012	Columbia, South Carolina	Consisted parts of Duval, Flagler, Nassau, St. Johns and Volusia counties
	Dorothy Hukill	Republican	2012–2016	New York City, New York	Redistricted; Consisted of most of Volusia County, northern Lake County, and the western-half of Marion County
	Keith Perry	Republican	2016–2022	Tallahassee, Florida	Redistricted; Consisted of all of Clay County, most of Bradford County, and the northern-half of Marion County
	Tom Wright	Republican	2022–present	New Smyrna Beach, Florida	Redistricted from the 14th district; Consists of most of Volusia County and part of northern Brevard County
	Jake Johansson	Republican	2026–present		

== Elections ==
=== 2018 ===
2018 Florida's 8th senate district election
Party	Candidate	Votes	%
Republican	Keith Perry (incumbent)	100,690	49.4
Democratic	Kayser Enneking	98,692	48.4
Independent	Charles E. Goston	4,319	2.1
Majority		1,998	1.0
Total votes		203,701	100.0

=== 2022 ===
2022 Florida's 8th senate district election
Party	Candidate	Votes	%
Republican	Tom Wright (incumbent)	133,012	63.00
Democratic	Andrea Williams	78,085	37.00
Total votes		211,097	100%
Republican hold			

=== 2026 ===
Incumbent senator Tom Wright is ineligible for re-election in 2026.
