= Alexis Calatayud =

American politician

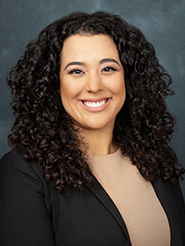

Member of the Florida Senate from the 38th district
- Incumbent
- Assumed office November 8, 2022
- Preceded by: Annette Taddeo (redistricting)

Personal details
- Born: Miami, Florida
- Party: Republican
- Education: Florida International University (BA)
- Website: Senate website Campaign website

Alexis Calatayud is an American politician serving as a member of the Florida Senate for the 38th district. She assumed office on November 8, 2022.

== Early life and education ==
Calatayud was born in Miami, Florida and is the granddaughter of Cuban political asylum seekers. Calatayud is a Non-denominational Christian.

Calatayud earned a Bachelor of Arts degree in political science, international relations, and Spanish from Florida International University.

== Career ==
As a college student, Calatayud interned in the office of Senator Marco Rubio. After graduating from college, she was a fellow at the National Campus Leadership Council in Washington, D.C. In 2018, Calatayud managed Vance Aloupis's campaign for the Florida House of Representatives. From 2018 to 2020, she served as a legislative aide for Aloupis. She joined the Florida Department of Education in 2020, serving as director of legislative affairs and director of public policy and programs.
