= 2022 Florida Senate election =

- November 8, 2022

All 40 seats in the Florida Senate 21 seats needed for a majority
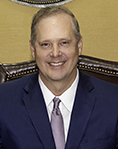

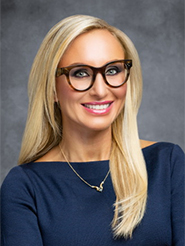
	Majority party	Minority party
Leader	Wilton Simpson (term-limited)	Lauren Book
Party	Republican	Democratic
Leader since	November 17, 2020	April 28, 2021
Leader's seat	10th - Trilby	35th - Davie
Last election	24 seats, 49.0%	16 seats, 48.6%
Seats won	28	12
Seat change	▲4	▼4
Popular vote	2,827,455	1,813,976
Percentage	60.07%	38.53%
Swing	▲11.04%	▼10.12%
- Republican hold Republican gain Democratic hold 50–60% 60–70% 70–80% 80–90% >90% 50–60% 60–70% 70–80% 80–90% >90% 50–60% 60–70% 70–80% 80–90% >90% 50–60% 60–70% 70–80% 80–90% >90%
Majority Leader before election
Debbie Mayfield
Republican
Elected Majority Leader
Ben Albritton
Republican

The 2022 elections for the Florida State Senate took place on Tuesday, November 8, 2022, to elect state senators from all 40 districts. Although on ordinary years, 20 senators are elected at a time on a staggered basis, races following redistricting elect all 40 members to ensure that each member represents an equal number of constituents. The Republican Party expanded their Senate majority from 24 to 28, gaining a supermajority in the Senate. The concurrently held House elections also resulted in a supermajority, giving Republicans supermajority control of the legislature.

== Retiring incumbents ==
=== Democratic ===
- 5th district: Audrey Gibson (term-limited)

=== Republican ===
- 2nd district: George Gainer
- 4th district: Aaron Bean (term-limited) (ran for Congress)
- 11th district: Wilton Simpson (term-limited) (ran for Commissioner of Agriculture)
- 12th district: Kelli Stargel (term-limited) (ran for Congress)
- 18th district: Jeff Brandes (term-limited)
- 33rd district: Ray Rodrigues

== Predictions ==
Source	Ranking	As of
CNalysis	Solid R	November 7, 2022
Sabato's Crystal Ball	Likely R	May 19, 2022

== Overview ==
Party	Candidates		Votes (Note: In 14 districts, the general election was canceled because one candidate was running unopposed. As a result, these vote totals do not represent how many voters supported each party in the general election.)	%	Seats			
Party	Opposed	Unopposed	Votes	%	Before	Won	After	+/−
Republican	26	9	2,827,455	60.07	24	28	28	+4
Democratic	26	5	1,813,976	38.53	16	12	12	-4
Green	1	0	64,119	1.36	0	0	0	-
Write-in	4	0	1,693	0.04	0	0	0	-
Total	57	14	4,707,243	100.00	40	40	40	±0
Source: Florida Division of Elections

Popular vote
Republican	60.07%
Democratic	38.53%
Other	1.40%

Senate seats
Republican	70%
Democratic	30%

=== Closest races ===
Seats where the margin of victory was under 10%:

1. District 25, 5.12%
2. District 3, 5.96% gain
3. District 38, 8.76% gain
4. District 10, 8.9%
5. District 14, 9.14% gain
6. District 26, 9.6%

== Results ==
Italics denote an open seat held by the incumbent party; bold text denotes a gain for a party.

State Senate District	Incumbent	Party	Elected Senator	Outcome
1	Doug Broxson	Rep	Doug Broxson	Rep Hold
2	George Gainer	Rep	Jay Trumbull	Rep Hold
3	Loranne Ausley	Dem	**Corey Simon**	**Rep Gain**
4	Aaron Bean	Rep	Clay Yarborough	Rep Hold
5	Audrey Gibson	Dem	Tracie Davis	Dem Hold
6	Jennifer Bradley	Rep	Jennifer Bradley	Rep Hold
7	Travis Hutson	Rep	Travis Hutson	Rep Hold
8	Tom Wright	Rep	Tom Wright	Rep Hold
9	Keith Perry	Rep	Keith Perry	Rep Hold
10	Jason Brodeur	Rep	Jason Brodeur	Rep Hold
11	Wilton Simpson	Rep	Blaise Ingoglia	Rep Hold
12	Kelli Stargel	Rep	Colleen Burton	Rep Hold
13	Dennis Baxley	Rep	Dennis Baxley	Rep Hold
14	Janet Cruz	Dem	**Jay Collins**	**Rep Gain**
15	Geraldine Thompson	Dem	Geraldine Thompson	Dem Hold
16	Darryl Rouson	Dem	Darryl Rouson	Dem Hold
17	Linda Stewart	Dem	Linda Stewart	Dem Hold
18	Jeff Brandes	Rep	Nick DiCeglie	Rep Hold
19	Debbie Mayfield	Rep	Debbie Mayfield	Rep Hold
20	Jim Boyd	Rep	Jim Boyd	Rep Hold
21	Ed Hooper	Rep	Ed Hooper	Rep Hold
22	Joe Gruters	Rep	Joe Gruters	Rep Hold
23	Danny Burgess	Rep	Danny Burgess	Rep Hold
24	Bobby Powell	Dem	Bobby Powell	Dem Hold
25	Vic Torres	Dem	Vic Torres	Dem Hold
26	Lori Berman	Dem	Lori Berman	Dem Hold
27	Ben Albritton	Rep	Ben Albritton	Rep Hold
28	Kathleen Passidomo	Rep	Kathleen Passidomo	Rep Hold
29	None (redistricting)		**Erin Grall**	**Rep Gain** (Note: Grall's seat is labeled as a gain while Osgood's and Book's are not because Osgood and Book were redistricted incumbent senators, while Grall was newly elected to the senate.)
30	Tina Polsky	Dem	Tina Polsky	Dem Hold
31	Gayle Harrell	Rep	Gayle Harrell	Rep Hold
32	Rosalind Osgood and Lauren Book (redistricting)	Dem	Rosalind Osgood	Dem Hold
33	Ray Rodrigues	Rep	Jonathan Martin	Rep Hold
34	Shevrin Jones	Dem	Shevrin Jones	Dem Hold
35	None (redistricting)		Lauren Book	Dem Hold
36	Ileana Garcia	Rep	Ileana Garcia	Rep Hold
37	Jason Pizzo	Dem	Jason Pizzo	Dem Hold
38	Annette Taddeo	Dem	**Alexis Calatayud**	**Rep Gain**
39	Bryan Avila	Rep	Bryan Avila	Rep Hold
40	Ana Maria Rodriguez	Rep	Ana Maria Rodriguez	Rep Hold

== District 1 ==
2022 Florida's 1st Senate District election
- November 8, 2022
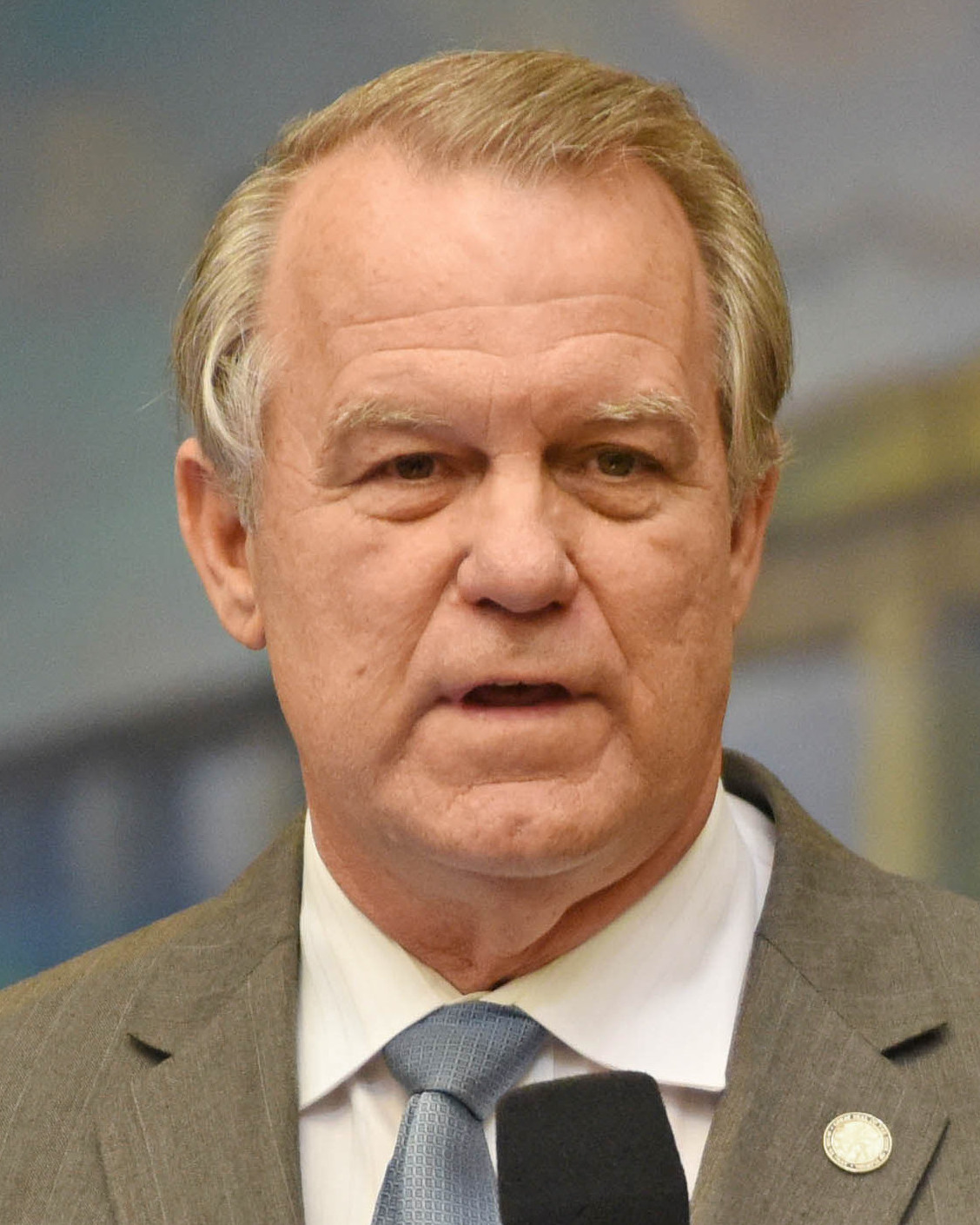

Nominee	Doug Broxson	Charlie Nichols
Party	Republican	Democratic
Popular vote	145,155	58,724
Percentage	71.20%	28.80%
- Precinct results Broxson: 50–60% 60–70% 70–80% 80–90% >90% Nichols: 50–60% 60–70% 70–80% 80–90% >90%
Senator before election
Doug Broxson
Republican
Elected Senator
Doug Broxson
Republican

The 1st district contains Escambia and Santa Rosa Counties, as well as a portion of Okaloosa County. Following redistricting, that portion, previously located in southern Okaloosa County, was swapped from the 2nd district for a portion in the northern part of the county, including Laurel Hill and northern Crestview.

The incumbent was Republican Doug Broxson, who was re-elected with 65.3% of the vote in 2020. He ran for re-election.

=== Republican primary ===
==== Candidates ====
- Doug Broxson, incumbent state senator
- John Mills, retired U.S. Navy pilot and perennial candidate

==== Endorsements ====
Doug Broxson

Organizations

- Florida Chamber of Commerce
- National Federation of Independent Business

==== Results ====
Republican primary
Party	Candidate	Votes	%
Republican	Doug Broxson (incumbent)	54,015	75.6
Republican	John Mills	17,459	24.4
Total votes		71,434	100%

=== Democratic primary ===
==== Candidates ====
- Charlie Nichols, former school administrator and U.S. Army veteran

==== Results ====
2022 Florida Senate Democratic primary, 1st District
Party	Candidate	Votes	%
Democratic	Charlie Nichols	Unopposed	
Total votes		N/A	100.0

=== General election ===
==== Results ====
General election
Party	Candidate	Votes	%
Republican	Doug Broxson (incumbent)	145,155	71.20
Democratic	Charlie Nichols	58,724	28.80
Total votes		203,879	100%
Republican hold			

== District 2 ==
2022 Florida's 2nd Senate District election
- November 8, 2022
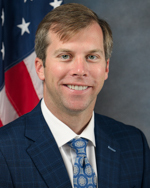

Nominee	Jay Trumbull	Carolynn Zonia
Party	Republican	Democratic
Popular vote	159,041	43,498
Percentage	78.52%	21.48%
- Precinct results Trumbull: 50–60% 60–70% 70–80% 80–90% >90% Zonia: 50–60% 60–70%
Senator before election
George Gainer
Republican
Elected Senator
Jay Trumbull
Republican

The 2nd district is located in the middle of the Florida panhandle. Following redistricting, the district remained mostly unchanged, gaining Calhoun County from the 3rd district and swapping a portion of northern Okaloosa County for a southern portion of it from the 1st district.

The incumbent was Republican George Gainer, who was re-elected with 75.3% of the vote in 2018. He retired.

=== Republican primary ===
==== Candidates ====
- Regina Piazza, civil engineer
- Jay Trumbull, state representative

==== Endorsements ====
Jay Trumbull

Statewide politicians

- Ron DeSantis, Governor of Florida

State legislators

- Ben Albritton, state senator
- Brad Drake, state representative
- Kathleen Passidomo, state senator
- Wilton Simpson, president of the Florida Senate
- Chris Sprowls, state representative

Organizations

- Florida Chamber of Commerce
- National Federation of Independent Business
Declined to endorse

State legislators

- George Gainer, incumbent state senator

==== Debate ====
2022 Florida's 2nd Senate district Republican primary debate
No.	Date	Host	Moderator	Link	Republican	Republican
Key: P Participant A Absent N Not invited I Invited W Withdrawn						
Key: P Participant A Absent N Not invited I Invited W Withdrawn					Regina Piazza	Jay Trumbull
1	Jun. 29, 2022	Bay County Republican Party		YouTube	P	P

==== Results ====
Republican primary
Party	Candidate	Votes	%
Republican	Jay Trumbull	55,198	76.49
Republican	Regina Piazza	16,961	23.51
Total votes		72,159	100%

=== Democratic primary ===
- Carolynn Zonia, former emergency physician

==== Results ====
2022 Florida Senate Democratic primary, 2nd District
Party	Candidate	Votes	%
Democratic	Carolynn Zonia	Unopposed	
Total votes		N/A	100.0

=== General election ===
==== Results ====
General election
Party	Candidate	Votes	%
Republican	Jay Trumbull	159,041	78.52
Democratic	Carolynn Zonia	43,498	21.48
Total votes		202,539	100%
Republican hold			

== District 3 ==
2022 Florida Senate District election 3
- November 8, 2022
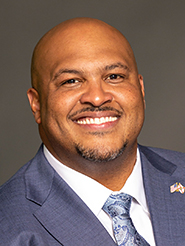

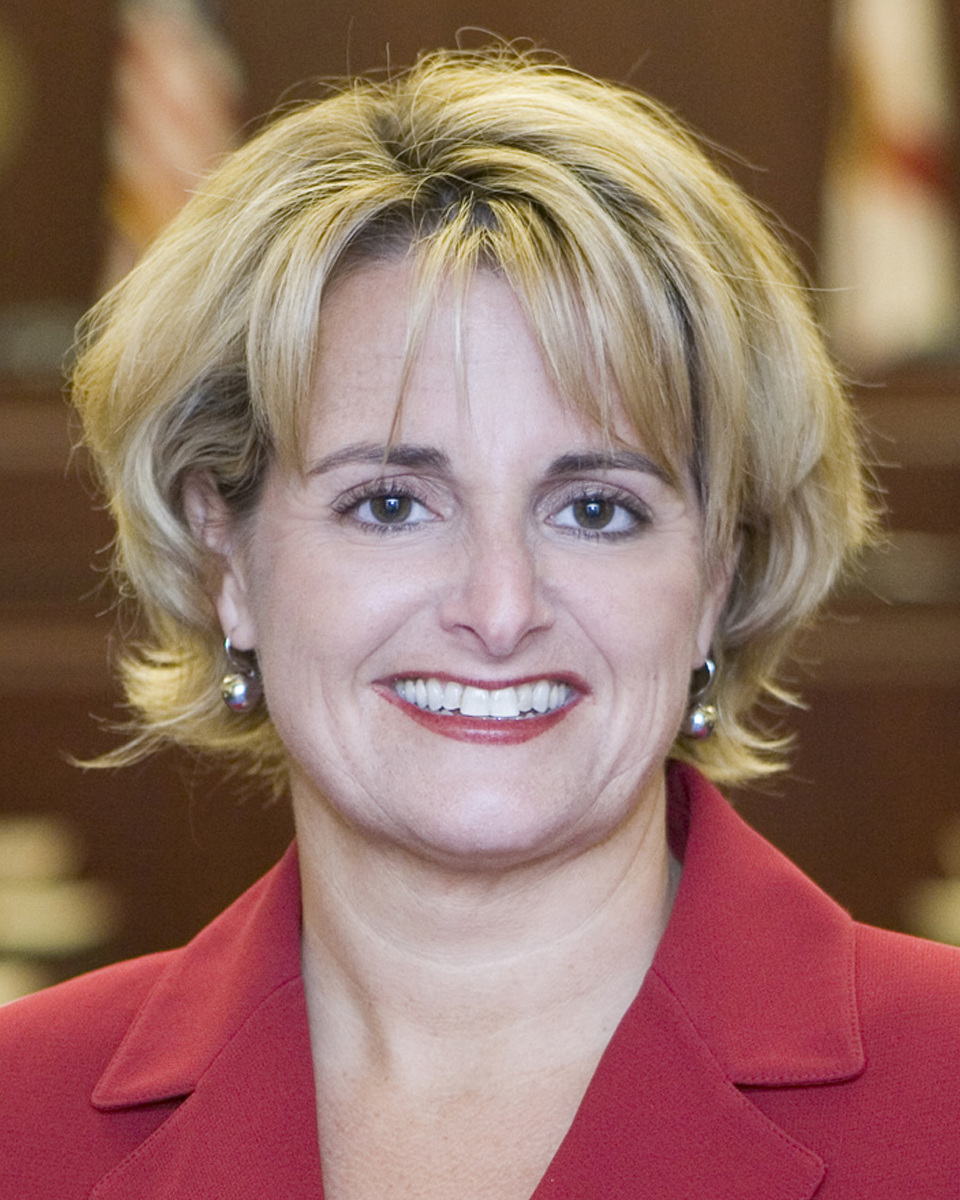
Nominee	Corey Simon	Loranne Ausley
Party	Republican	Democratic
Popular vote	113,477	100,696
Percentage	52.98%	47.02%
- Precinct results Simon: 50–60% 60–70% 70–80% 80–90% >90% Ausley: 50–60% 60–70% 70–80% 80–90% >90%
Senator before election
Loranne Ausley
Democratic
Elected Senator
Corey Simon
Republican

The 3rd district, Florida's largest legislative district by area, is located in the Big Bend and includes the state capital of Tallahassee. Following redistricting, the district ceded Calhoun County to the 2nd district and gained Dixie, Lafayette and Suwannee Counties from the 6th district. The incumbent was Democrat Loranne Ausley, who was elected with 53.4% of the vote in 2020. She ran for re-election.

=== Democratic nominee ===
- Loranne Ausley, incumbent state senator

=== Republican nominee ===
- Corey Simon, AmeriCorps Florida administrator and former NFL player

=== General election ===
==== Predictions ====
Source	Ranking
CNalysis	Lean R

==== Endorsements ====
Loranne Ausley (D)

Labor unions

- 1199SEIU United Healthcare Workers East
- American Federation of State, County, and Municipal Employees

Organizations

- EMILY's List
- Equality Florida
- Sierra Club
Corey Simon (R)

Statewide politicians

- Ron DeSantis, Governor of Florida

State legislators

- Ben Albritton, state senator
- Kathleen Passidomo, state senator
- Wilton Simpson, president of the Florida Senate

Organizations

- Florida Chamber of Commerce

==== Debate ====
2022 Florida's 3rd Senate district debate
No.	Date	Host	Moderator	Link	Democratic	Republican
Key: P Participant A Absent N Not invited I Invited W Withdrawn						
Key: P Participant A Absent N Not invited I Invited W Withdrawn					Loranne Ausley	Corey Simon
1		Capital Tiger Bay Club	Gary Fineout	Tallahassee Democrat	P	P

==== Results ====
General election
Party	Candidate	Votes	%
Republican	Corey Simon	113,477	52.98
Democratic	Loranne Ausley (incumbent)	100,696	47.02
Total votes		214,173	100%
Republican gain from Democratic			

== District 4 ==
2022 Florida Senate District election 4
- November 8, 2022
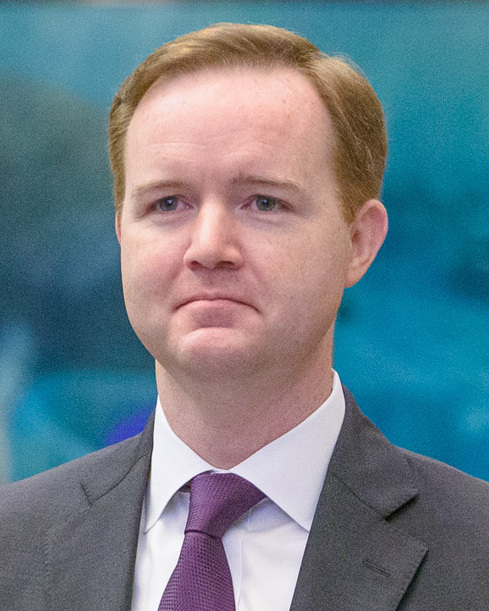

Nominee	Clay Yarborough	Sharmin Smith
Party	Republican	Democratic
Popular vote	149,177	71,472
Percentage	67.61%	32.39%
- Precinct results Yarborough: 50–60% 60–70% 70–80% 80–90% >90% Smith: 50–60% 60–70%
Senator before election
Aaron Bean
Republican
Elected Senator
Clay Yarborough
Republican

The 4th district is composed of all of Nassau County and part of Duval County. Following redistricting, the district remained mostly unchanged, gaining a portion of The Northside from the 5th district in exchange for portions of the Westside and The Southside. The incumbent was Republican Aaron Bean, who was re-elected with 63.4% of the vote in 2018. He was term-limited and could not seek re-election, and instead ran for U.S. House.

=== Republican nominee ===
- Clay Yarborough, state representative

=== Democratic nominee ===
- Sharmin Smith, author

=== General election ===
==== Endorsements ====
Sharmin Smith (D)

Organizations

- National Organization for Women
Clay Yarborough (R)

Statewide politicians

- Cord Byrd, Florida Secretary of State

State legislators

- Jennifer Bradley, state senator
- Jason Fischer, state representative
- Travis Hutson, state senator
- Kathleen Passidomo, state senator
- Wilton Simpson, president of the Florida Senate

Organizations

- Florida Chamber of Commerce

==== Results ====
General election
Party	Candidate	Votes	%
Republican	Clay Yarborough	149,177	67.61
Democratic	Sharmin Smith	71,472	32.39
Total votes		220,649	100%
Republican hold			

== District 5 ==
2022 Florida Senate District election 5
- November 8, 2022
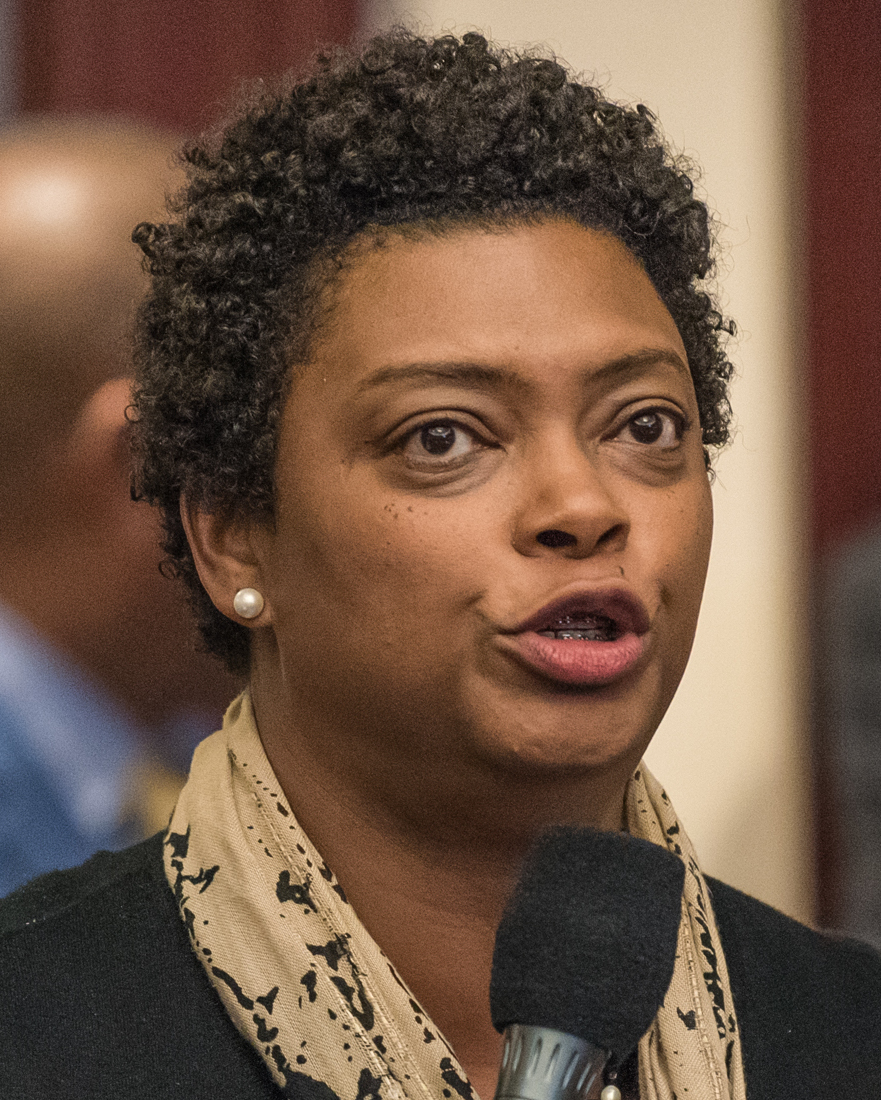

Nominee	Tracie Davis	Binod Kumar
Party	Democratic	Republican
Popular vote	86,784	64,028
Percentage	57.54%	42.46%
- Precinct results Davis: 50–60% 60–70% 70–80% 80–90% >90% Kumar: 50–60% 60–70% 70–80%
Senator before election
Audrey Gibson
Democratic
Elected Senator
Tracie Davis
Democratic

Following redistricting, the 5th and 6th districts switched numbers. The now-5th district remained mostly unchanged, encompassing central Duval County and the Jacksonville urban core.

The district's boundaries run largely along roads: the western border along State Road 23, the northwestern border along Interstate 10, the northern border along Interstate 295, and the eastern border along State Road 115. The incumbent was Democrat Audrey Gibson, who was re-elected unopposed in 2018. She was term-limited and could not seek re-election.

=== Democratic primary ===
==== Candidates ====
- Tracie Davis, state representative
- Reggie Gaffney, Jacksonville city councilor

==== Endorsements ====
Tracie Davis

Organizations

- EMILY's List
- Equality Florida
- Jacksonville Chamber of Commerce

Labor unions

- 1199SEIU United Healthcare Workers East
- American Federation of State, County, and Municipal Employees

Organizations

- National Organization for Women
Reggie Gaffney

Federal politicians

- Corinne Brown, former U.S. representative for Florida's 5th congressional district
- Al Lawson, U.S. representative for Florida's 5th congressional district
Declined to endorse

State legislators

- Audrey Gibson, incumbent state senator for this district

==== Results ====
Democratic primary
Party	Candidate	Votes	%
Democratic	Tracie Davis	34,075	68.05%
Democratic	Reggie Gaffney	15,996	31.95%
Total votes		50,071	100%

=== Republican nominee ===
- Binod Kumar, retired JEA engineer

=== General election ===
==== Results ====
General election
Party	Candidate	Votes	%
Democratic	Tracie Davis	86,784	57.54
Republican	Binod Kumar	64,028	42.46
Independent	Patrick Tucker (write-in)	0	0.0
Total votes		150,812	100%
Democratic hold			

== District 6 ==
2022 Florida Senate District election 6
- November 8, 2022
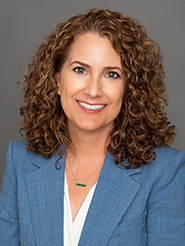
Nominee	Jennifer Bradley (Uncontested)
Party	Republican
Senator before election
Jennifer Bradley
Republican
Elected Senator
Jennifer Bradley
Republican

The 6th district is located in North central Florida. Following redistricting, the district switched numbers with the 5th. Geographically, the district changed from a sprawling C-shape to become more compact, shedding Dixie, Lafayette, Levy and Suwannee Counties while absorbing the northern half of Alachua County, including part of Gainesville. The incumbent was Republican Jennifer Bradley, who was elected with 74.8% of the vote in 2020. She ran for re-election unopposed, so both the primary and general elections were canceled.

=== Republican nominee ===
- Jennifer Bradley, incumbent state senator

=== Endorsements ===
Jennifer Bradley

Labor unions

- 1199SEIU United Healthcare Workers East

Organizations

- Americans for Prosperity
- Florida Chamber of Commerce

=== General election ===
==== Results ====
General election
Party	Candidate	Votes	%
Republican	Jennifer Bradley (incumbent)	Unopposed	
Total votes		—	—
Republican hold			

== District 7 ==
2022 Florida Senate District election 7
- November 8, 2022
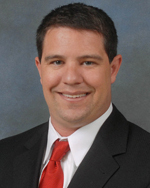
Nominee	Travis Hutson (Uncontested)
Party	Republican
Senator before election
Travis Hutson
Republican
Elected Senator
Travis Hutson
Republican

Prior to redistricting, the 7th district contained all of Flagler and St Johns Counties, and part of Volusia County, including Daytona Beach and Pierson. After redistricting, the district gained all of Putnam County, its share of Volusia County shrinking to include only the northernmost parts. The incumbent was Republican Travis Hutson, who was re-elected with 61.7% of the vote in 2020. No non-Republican filed to run, so Hutson won re-election unopposed after winning the Republican primary.

=== Republican primary ===
==== Candidates ====
- Travis Hutson, incumbent state senator
- Gerry James, minister and former professional wrestler

==== Endorsements ====
Travis Hutson

Organizations

- Florida Chamber of Commerce
- National Federation of Independent Business

==== Results ====
Republican primary
Party	Candidate	Votes	%
Republican	Travis Hutson (incumbent)	40,263	56.12%
Republican	Gerry James	31,486	43.88%
Total votes		71,749	100%

=== General election ===
==== Results ====
General election
Party	Candidate	Votes	%
Republican	Travis Hutson (incumbent)	Unopposed	
Total votes		—	—
Republican hold			

== District 8 ==
2022 Florida Senate District election 8
- November 8, 2022
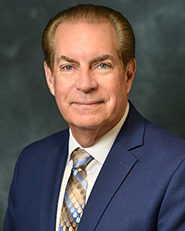

Nominee	Tom Wright	Andrea Williams
Party	Republican	Democratic
Popular vote	133,012	78,085
Percentage	63.00%	37.00%
- Precinct results Wright: 50–60% 60–70% 70–80% 80–90% >90% Williams: 50–60% 60–70% 70–80% 80–90% No votes
Senator before election
Tom Wright
Republican
Elected Senator
Tom Wright
Republican

The incumbent was Republican Tom Wright, who ran for re-election.

=== Republican primary ===
- Tom Wright, incumbent state senator

==== Results ====
Republican primary
Party	Candidate	Votes	%
Republican	Tom Wright (incumbent)	Unopposed	
Total votes		—	—
Republican hold			

=== Democratic primary ===
==== Candidates ====
- Richard Paul Dembinsky, perennial candidate
- Andrea Williams, nonprofit manager

==== Results ====
Democratic primary
Party	Candidate	Votes	%
Democratic	Andrea Williams	31,058	84.7%
Democratic	Richard Paul Dembinsky	5,593	15.3%
Total votes		36,651	100%

=== General election ===
==== Endorsements ====
Tom Wright

Organizations

- Florida Chamber of Commerce

==== Results ====
General election
Party	Candidate	Votes	%
Republican	Tom Wright (incumbent)	133,012	63.00
Democratic	Andrea Williams	78,085	37.00
Total votes		211,097	100%
Republican hold			

== District 9 ==
2022 Florida Senate District election 9
- November 8, 2022
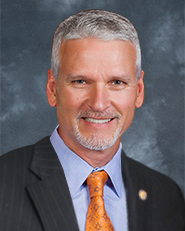

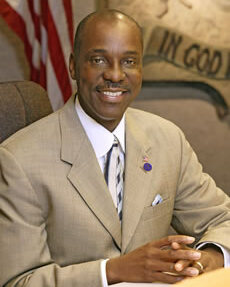
Nominee	Keith Perry	Rodney Long
Party	Republican	Democratic
Popular vote	135,568	71,276
Percentage	65.54%	34.46%
- Precinct results Perry: 50–60% 60–70% 70–80% 80–90% >90% Long: 50–60% 60–70% 70–80% 80–90% >90%
Senator before election
Keith Perry
Republican
Elected Senator
Keith Perry
Republican

The incumbent was Republican Keith Perry, who ran for re-election.

=== Republican primary ===
- Keith Perry, incumbent state senator

==== Results ====
2022 Florida Senate Republican primary, 9th District
Party	Candidate	Votes	%
Republican	Keith Perry	Unopposed	
Total votes		N/A	100.0

=== Democratic primary ===
- Rodney Long, former Alachua County commissioner

==== Results ====
2022 Florida Senate Democratic primary, 9th District
Party	Candidate	Votes	%
Democratic	Rodney Long	Unopposed	
Total votes		N/A	100.0

=== General election ===
==== Endorsements ====
Keith Perry

Organizations

- Americans for Prosperity
- Florida Chamber of Commerce

==== Results ====
General election
Party	Candidate	Votes	%
Republican	Keith Perry (incumbent)	135,568	65.54
Democratic	Rodney Long	71,276	34.46
Total votes		206,844	100%
Republican hold			

== District 10 ==
2022 Florida Senate District election 10
- November 8, 2022
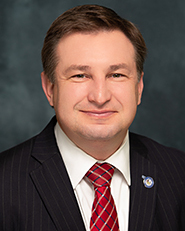

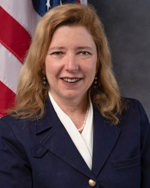
Nominee	Jason Brodeur	Joy Goff-Marcil
Party	Republican	Democratic
Popular vote	114,022	95,391
Percentage	54.45%	45.55%
- Precinct results Brodeur: 50–60% 60–70% 70–80% 80–90% Goff-Marcil: 50–60% 60–70%
Senator before election
Jason Brodeur
Republican
Elected Senator
Jason Brodeur
Republican

The incumbent was Republican Jason Brodeur, who ran for re-election.

=== Republican primary ===
==== Candidates ====
- Jason Brodeur, incumbent state senator
- Denali Charres, registered nurse

==== Endorsements ====
Jason Brodeur

Organizations

- Florida Chamber of Commerce
- National Federation of Independent Business

==== Results ====
Republican primary
Party	Candidate	Votes	%
Republican	Jason Brodeur	37,512	84.83
Republican	Denali Charres	6,708	15.17
Total votes		44,220	100%

=== Democratic nominee ===
- Joy Goff-Marcil, state representative

==== Endorsements ====
Joy Goff-Marcil

Labor unions

- 1199SEIU United Healthcare Workers East

Organizations

- EMILY's List
- Equality Florida
- Sierra Club

=== General election ===
==== Predictions ====
Source	Ranking
CNalysis	Lean R

==== Results ====
General election
Party	Candidate	Votes	%
Republican	Jason Brodeur (incumbent)	114,022	54.45
Democratic	Joy Goff-Marcil	95,391	45.55
Total votes		209,413	100%
Republican hold			

== District 11 ==
2022 Florida Senate District election 11
- November 8, 2022
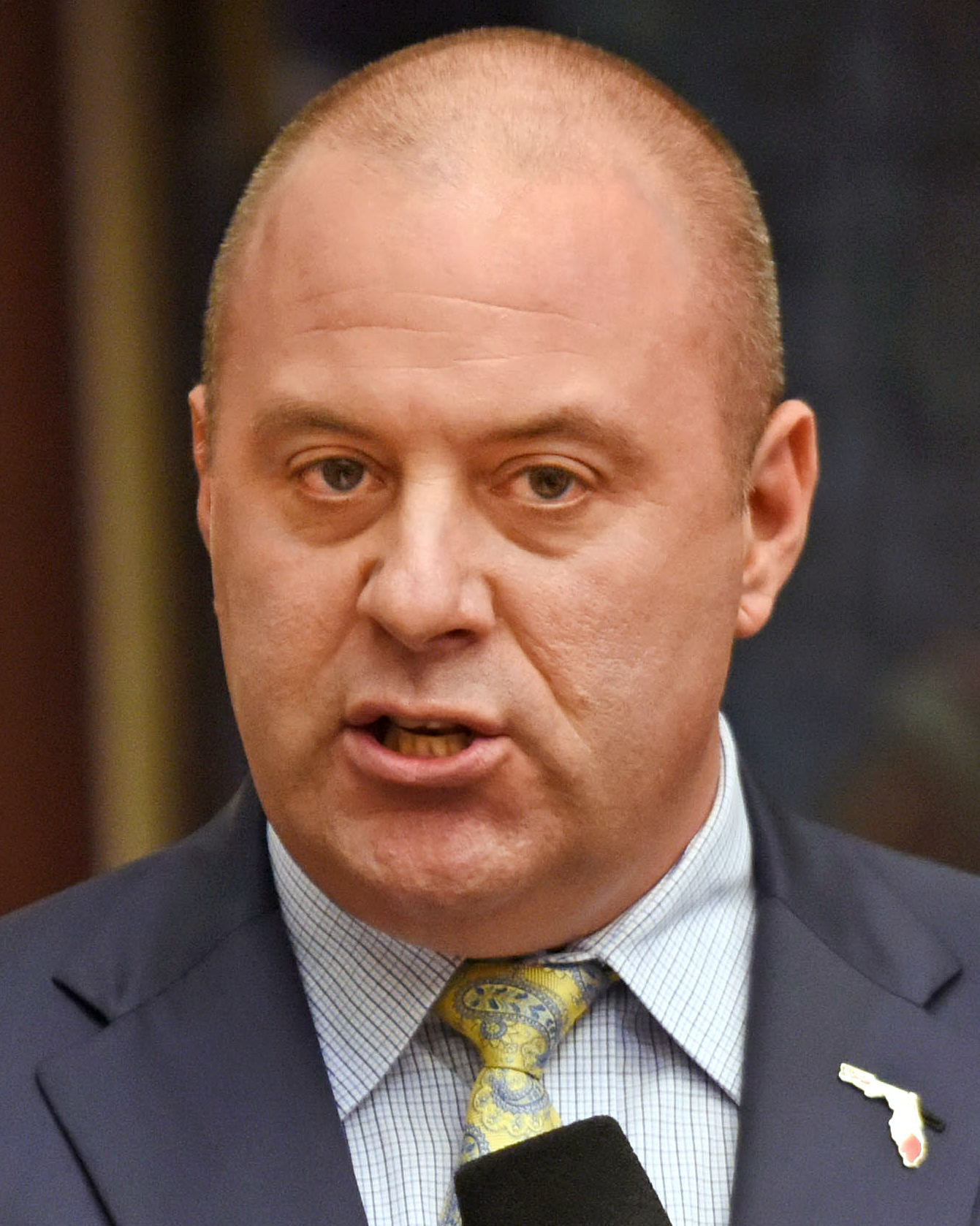

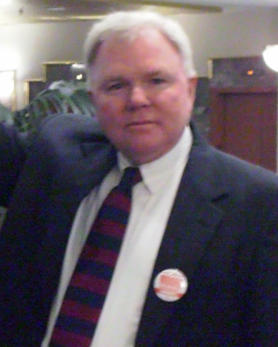
Nominee	Blaise Ingoglia	Brian Moore
Party	Republican	Green
Popular vote	192,167	64,119
Percentage	74.98%	25.02%
- Precinct results Ingoglia: 60–70% 70–80% 80–90% >90%
Senator before election
Wilton Simpson
Republican
Elected Senator
Blaise Ingoglia
Republican

The incumbent was Republican Wilton Simpson, who was term-limited and could not seek re-election, and instead ran for Commissioner of Agriculture.

=== Republican nominee ===
- Blaise Ingoglia, state representative

=== Green nominee ===
- Brian Moore, retired healthcare executive, former District of Columbia Advisory Neighborhood Commission member, and perennial candidate

=== General election ===
==== Endorsements ====
Blaise Ingoglia

Federal politicians

- Ted Cruz, U.S. senator from Texas
- Marco Rubio, U.S. senator from Florida

Statewide politicians

- Ron DeSantis, Governor of Florida

Organizations

- Americans for Prosperity
- Florida Chamber of Commerce
Declined to endorse

Political parties

- Florida Green Party

==== Results ====
General election
Party	Candidate	Votes	%
Republican	Blaise Ingoglia	192,167	74.98
Green	Brian Moore	64,119	25.02
Total votes		256,286	100%
Republican hold			

== District 12 ==
2022 Florida Senate District election 12
- November 8, 2022
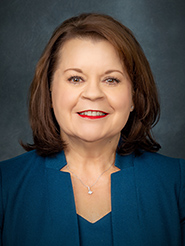

Nominee	Colleen Burton	Veysel Dokur
Party	Republican	Democratic
Popular vote	102,441	59,734
Percentage	63.17%	36.83%
- Precinct results Burton: 50–60% 60–70% 70–80% 80–90% >90% Dokur: 50–60% 60–70% 70–80% 80–90% No votes
Senator before election
Kelli Stargel
Republican
Elected Senator
Colleen Burton
Republican

The incumbent was Republican Kelli Stargel, who was term-limited and could not seek re-election, and instead ran for U.S. House.

=== Republican primary ===
- Colleen Burton, state representative

==== Results ====
2022 Florida Senate Republican primary, 12th District
Party	Candidate	Votes	%
Republican	Colleen Burton (incumbent)	Unopposed	
Total votes		N/A	100.0

=== Democratic primary ===
- Veysel Dokur, vice chair of the Polk County Democratic Party

==== Results ====
2022 Florida Senate Democratic primary, 12th District
Party	Candidate	Votes	%
Democratic	Veysel Dokur	Unopposed	
Total votes		N/A	100.0

=== General election ===
==== Endorsements ====
Colleen Burton

State legislators

- Kathleen Passidomo, state senator
- Wilton Simpson, president of the Florida Senate

Organizations

- Florida Chamber of Commerce

==== Results ====
General election
Party	Candidate	Votes	%
Republican	Colleen Burton	102,441	63.17
Democratic	Veysel Dokur	59,734	36.83
Total votes		162,175	100%
Republican hold			

== District 13 ==
2022 Florida Senate District election 13
- November 8, 2022
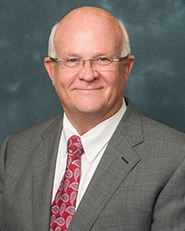

Nominee	Dennis Baxley	Stephanie Dukes
Party	Republican	Democratic
Popular vote	133,755	81,472
Percentage	62.15%	37.85%
- Precinct results Baxley: 50–60% 60–70% 70–80% 80–90% Dukes: 50–60% 60–70%
Senator before election
Dennis Baxley
Republican
Elected Senator
Dennis Baxley
Republican

The incumbent was Republican Dennis Baxley, who ran for re-election.

=== Republican primary ===
- Dennis Baxley, incumbent state senator

==== Results ====
2022 Florida Senate Republican primary, 13th District
Party	Candidate	Votes	%
Republican	Dennis Baxley (incumbent)	Unopposed	
Total votes		N/A	100.0

=== Democratic nominee ===
- Stephanie Dukes, retired teacher

==== Results ====
2022 Florida Senate Democratic primary, 13th District
Party	Candidate	Votes	%
Democratic	Stephanie Dukes	Unopposed	
Total votes		N/A	100.0

=== General election ===
==== Endorsements ====
Dennis Baxley

Organizations

- Florida Chamber of Commerce

==== Results ====
General election
Party	Candidate	Votes	%
Republican	Dennis Baxley (incumbent)	133,755	62.15
Democratic	Stephanie Dukes	81,472	37.85
Total votes		215,227	100%
Republican hold			

== District 14 ==
2022 Florida Senate District election 14
- November 8, 2022
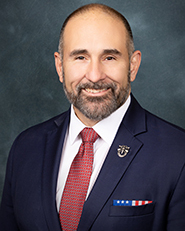

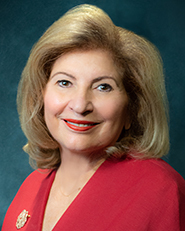
Nominee	Jay Collins	Janet Cruz
Party	Republican	Democratic
Popular vote	103,240	85,159
Percentage	54.8%	45.2%
- Precinct results Collins: 50–60% 60–70% 70–80% Cruz: 50–60% 60–70% 70–80%
Senator before election
Janet Cruz
Democratic
Elected Senator
Jay Collins
Republican

The incumbent was Democrat Janet Cruz, who flipped the district in 2018. She ran for re-election.

=== Democratic nominee ===
- Janet Cruz, incumbent state senator

=== Republican nominee ===
- Jay Collins, former Green Beret

=== General election ===
==== Predictions ====
Source	Ranking
CNalysis	Tilt D

==== Endorsements ====
Janet Cruz (D)

Labor unions

- 1199SEIU United Healthcare Workers East
- American Federation of State, County, and Municipal Employees
- Florida Education Association

Newspapers

- Tampa Bay Times

Organizations

- EMILY's List
- Equality Florida
- Sierra Club
Jay Collins (R)

Statewide politicians

- Ron DeSantis, Governor of Florida

Organizations

- Florida Chamber of Commerce

==== Results ====
General election
Party	Candidate	Votes	%
Republican	Jay Collins	103,240	54.80
Democratic	Janet Cruz (incumbent)	85,159	45.20
Total votes		188,399	100%
Republican gain from Democratic			

== District 15 ==
2022 Florida Senate District election 15
- November 8, 2022
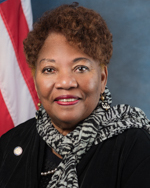
Nominee	Geraldine Thompson (Uncontested)
Party	Democratic
Senator before election
Randolph Bracy
Democratic
Elected Senator
Geraldine Thompson
Democratic

The incumbent was Democrat Randolph Bracy, who did not seek re-election and instead ran for U.S. House. Because no non-Democrats filed to run, the general election was canceled.

=== Democratic primary ===
Democratic primary results by precinct Map legend: Thompson—50–60%; Thompson—60–70%; Brown—50–60%; Tie—50%; No votes

==== Candidates ====
- Kamia Brown, state representative
- Geraldine Thompson, state representative and former state senator

==== Endorsements ====
Kamia Brown

State legislators

- Lori Berman, state senator
- Shevrin Jones, state senator
- Vic Torres, state senator

Local officials

- Amy Mercado, Orange County Property Appraiser and former state representative
- John Mina, Orange County Sheriff

Labor unions

- 1199SEIU United Healthcare Workers East (co-endorsement with Thompson)
- American Federation of State, County, and Municipal Employees
Geraldine Thompson

Labor unions

- 1199SEIU United Healthcare Workers East (co-endorsement with Brown)

Newspapers

- Orlando Sentinel

Organizations

- National Organization for Women

==== Polling ====
Poll source	Date(s) administered	Sample size (Note: Key: A – all adults RV – registered voters LV – likely voters V – unclear)	Margin of error	Kamia Brown	Geraldine Thompson	Undecided
RMG Research	July 6–11, 2022	300 (LV)	± 5.7%	19%	26%	56%

==== Debate ====
2022 Florida's 15th Senate district democratic primary debate
No.	Date	Host	Moderator	Link	Democratic	Democratic
Key: P Participant A Absent N Not invited I Invited W Withdrawn						
Key: P Participant A Absent N Not invited I Invited W Withdrawn					Kamia Brown	Geraldine Thompson
1	Sep. 26, 2022	WESH	Greg Fox	YouTube	P	P

==== Results ====
Democratic primary
Party	Candidate	Votes	%
Democratic	Geraldine Thompson	29,173	53.22%
Democratic	Kamia Brown	25,641	46.78%
Total votes		54,814	100%

=== General election ===
==== Results ====
General election
Party	Candidate	Votes	%
Democratic	Geraldine Thompson	Unopposed	
Total votes		—	—
Democratic hold			

== District 16 ==
2022 Florida Senate District election 16
- November 8, 2022
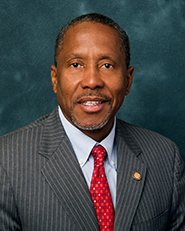

Nominee	Darryl Rouson	Christina Paylan
Party	Democratic	Republican
Popular vote	93,839	52,927
Percentage	63.94%	36.06%
- Precinct results Rouson: 50–60% 60–70% 70–80% 80–90% >90% Paylan: 50–60% 60–70% 70–80% 80–90% >90%
Senator before election
Darryl Rouson
Democratic
Elected Senator
Darryl Rouson
Democratic

The incumbent was Democrat Darryl Rouson, who ran for re-election.

=== Democratic nominee ===
- Darryl Rouson, incumbent state senator

==== Results ====
2022 Florida Senate Democratic primary, 16th District
Party	Candidate	Votes	%
Democratic	Darryl Rouson (incumbent)	Unopposed	
Total votes		N/A	100.0

=== Republican nominee ===
- Christina Paylan, former cosmetic surgeon and convicted felon

==== Results ====
2022 Florida Senate Republican primary, 16th District
Party	Candidate	Votes	%
Republican	Christina Paylan	Unopposed	
Total votes		N/A	100.0

=== General election ===
==== Endorsements ====
Darryl Rouson

Newspapers

- Tampa Bay Times

Organizations

- Equality Florida
- Sierra Club

==== Results ====
General election
Party	Candidate	Votes	%
Democratic	Darryl Rouson (incumbent)	93,839	63.94
Republican	Christina Paylan	52,927	36.06
Total votes		146,766	100%
Democratic hold			

== District 17 ==
2022 Florida Senate District election 17
- November 8, 2022
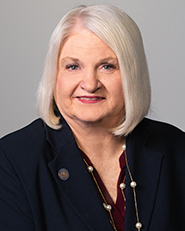

Nominee	Linda Stewart	Steve Dixon
Party	Democratic	Republican
Popular vote	85,689	67,170
Percentage	56.06%	43.94%
- Precinct results Stewart: 50–60% 60–70% 70–80% Dixon: 50–60% 60–70% 70–80% 80–90% No votes
Senator before election
Linda Stewart
Democratic
Elected Senator
Linda Stewart
Democratic

The incumbent was Democratic Linda Stewart, who ran for re-election.

=== Democratic primary ===
- Linda Stewart, incumbent state senator

==== Results ====
2022 Florida Senate Democratic primary, 17th District
Party	Candidate	Votes	%
Democratic	Linda Stewart (incumbent)	Unopposed	
Total votes		N/A	100.0

=== Republican primary ===
- Steve Dixon, insurance agent

==== Results ====
2022 Florida Senate Republican primary, 17th District
Party	Candidate	Votes	%
Republican	Steve Dixon	Unopposed	
Total votes		N/A	100.0

=== General election ===
==== Endorsements ====
Linda Stewart

Organizations

- Equality Florida
- Florida Chamber of Commerce
- Sierra Club

==== Results ====
General election
Party	Candidate	Votes	%
Democratic	Linda Stewart (incumbent)	85,689	56.06
Republican	Steve Dixon	67,170	43.94
Total votes		152,859	100%
Democratic hold			

== District 18 ==
2022 Florida Senate District election 18
- November 8, 2022
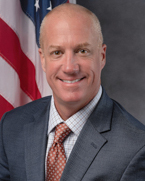

Nominee	Nick DiCeglie	Eunic Ortiz
Party	Republican	Democratic
Popular vote	128,983	97,760
Percentage	56.89%	43.11%
- Precinct results DiCeglie: 50–60% 60–70% 70–80% >90% Ortiz: 50–60% 60–70% 70–80% No votes: Tie: 50–60%
Senator before election
Jeff Brandes
Republican
Elected Senator
Nick DiCeglie
Republican

The incumbent was Republican Jeff Brandes, who was term-limited and could not seek re-election.

=== Republican nominee ===
- Nick DiCeglie, state representative

=== Democratic nominee ===
- Eunic Ortiz, University of Florida adjunct professor and former Service Employees International Union communications director

=== General election ===
==== Endorsements ====
Nick DiCeglie (R)

State legislators

- Jeff Brandes, incumbent state senator for this district
- Ed Hooper, state senator

Local politicians

- Rick Baker, former mayor of St. Petersburg

Organizations

- Americans for Prosperity
- Florida Chamber of Commerce
Eunic Ortiz (D)

Federal politicians

- Charlie Crist, U.S. representative for Florida's 13th congressional district and former governor of Florida

Statewide politicians

- Betty Castor, former Florida Commissioner of Education
- Alex Sink, former Chief Financial Officer of Florida

State legislators

- Janet Cruz, state senator
- Ben Diamond, state representative
- Anna Eskamani, state representative
- Michele Rayner, state representative
- Carl Zimmermann, former state representative

Labor unions

- 1199SEIU United Healthcare Workers East

Newspapers

- Tampa Bay Times

Organizations

- Democracy for America
- EMILY's List
- Equality Florida
- Human Rights Campaign
- LGBTQ Victory Fund
- National Organization for Women
- Run for Something
- Sierra Club

==== Results ====
General election
Party	Candidate	Votes	%
Republican	Nick DiCeglie	128.983	56.89
Democratic	Eunic Ortiz	97,760	43.11
Total votes		226,743	100%
Republican hold			

== District 19 ==
2022 Florida Senate District election 19
- November 8, 2022
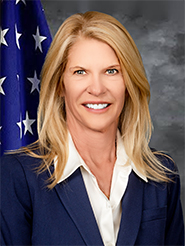
Nominee	Debbie Mayfield (Uncontested)
Party	Republican
Senator before election
Debbie Mayfield
Republican
Elected Senator
Debbie Mayfield
Republican

The incumbent was Republican Debbie Mayfield. Mayfield ran for re-election unopposed, so both the primary and general elections were canceled.

=== Republican nominee ===
- Debbie Mayfield, incumbent state senator

==== Endorsements ====
Debbie Mayfield

Organizations

- Americans for Prosperity
- Florida Chamber of Commerce

=== General election ===
==== Results ====
General election
Party	Candidate	Votes	%
Republican	Debbie Mayfield (incumbent)	Unopposed	
Total votes		—	—
Republican hold			

== District 20 ==
2022 Florida Senate District election 20
- November 8, 2022
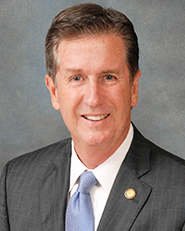
Nominee	Jim Boyd (Uncontested)
Party	Republican
Senator before election
Jim Boyd
Republican
Elected Senator
Jim Boyd
Republican

The incumbent was Republican Jim Boyd, who ran for re-election. Because no non-Republicans filed to run, the general election was canceled.

=== Republican primary ===
==== Candidates ====
- Jim Boyd, incumbent state senator
- John Houman, retired engineer, U.S. Navy veteran, and perennial candidate

==== Endorsements ====
Jim Boyd

Organizations

- Americans for Prosperity
- Florida Chamber of Commerce
- National Federation of Independent Business

==== Results ====
Republican primary
Party	Candidate	Votes	%
Republican	Jim Boyd (incumbent)	76,503	79.96%
Republican	John Houman	19,168	20.04%
Total votes		95,671	100%

=== General election ===
==== Results ====
General election
Party	Candidate	Votes	%
Republican	Jim Boyd (incumbent)	Unopposed	
Total votes		—	—
Republican hold			

== District 21 ==
2022 Florida Senate District election 21
- November 8, 2022
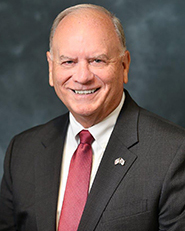

Nominee	Ed Hooper	Amaro Lionheart
Party	Republican	Democratic
Popular vote	148,673	80,928
Percentage	64.75%	35.25%
- Precinct results Hooper: 50–60% 60–70% 70–80% Lionheart: 50–60% Tie: 50%
Senator before election
Ed Hooper
Republican
Elected Senator
Ed Hooper
Republican

The incumbent was Republican Ed Hooper, who ran for re-election.

=== Republican nominee ===
- Ed Hooper, incumbent state senator

=== Democratic nominee ===
- Amaro Lionheart, filmmaker, entrepreneur, and educator

=== General election ===
==== Endorsements ====
Ed Hooper

Labor unions

- 1199SEIU United Healthcare Workers East
- American Federation of State, County, and Municipal Employees

Newspapers

- Tampa Bay Times

Organizations

- Florida Chamber of Commerce

==== Results ====
General election
Party	Candidate	Votes	%
Republican	Ed Hooper (incumbent)	148,673	64.75
Democratic	Amaro Lionheart	80,928	35.25
Total votes		229,601	100%
Republican hold			

== District 22 ==
2022 Florida Senate District election 22
- November 8, 2022
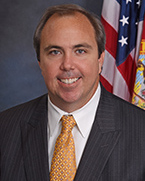
Nominee	Joe Gruters (Uncontested)
Party	Republican
Senator before election
Joe Gruters
Republican
Elected Senator
Joe Gruters
Republican

The incumbent was Republican Joe Gruters, who ran for re-election. Because no non-Republicans filed to run, the general election was canceled.

=== Republican primary ===
==== Candidates ====
- Joe Gruters, incumbent state senator
- Michael Johnson, community organizer and retired Fourth Estate official

==== Endorsements ====
Joe Gruters

U.S. Executive Branch officials

- Donald Trump, former president of the United States

Organizations

- Florida Chamber of Commerce
- National Federation of Independent Business

==== Results ====
Republican primary
Party	Candidate	Votes	%
Republican	Joe Gruters (incumbent)	85,696	66.9%
Republican	Michael Johnson	42,435	33.1%
Total votes		128,131	100%

=== General election ===
==== Results ====
General election
Party	Candidate	Votes	%
Republican	Joe Gruters (incumbent)	Unopposed	
Total votes		—	—
Republican hold			

== District 23 ==
2022 Florida Senate District election 23
- November 8, 2022
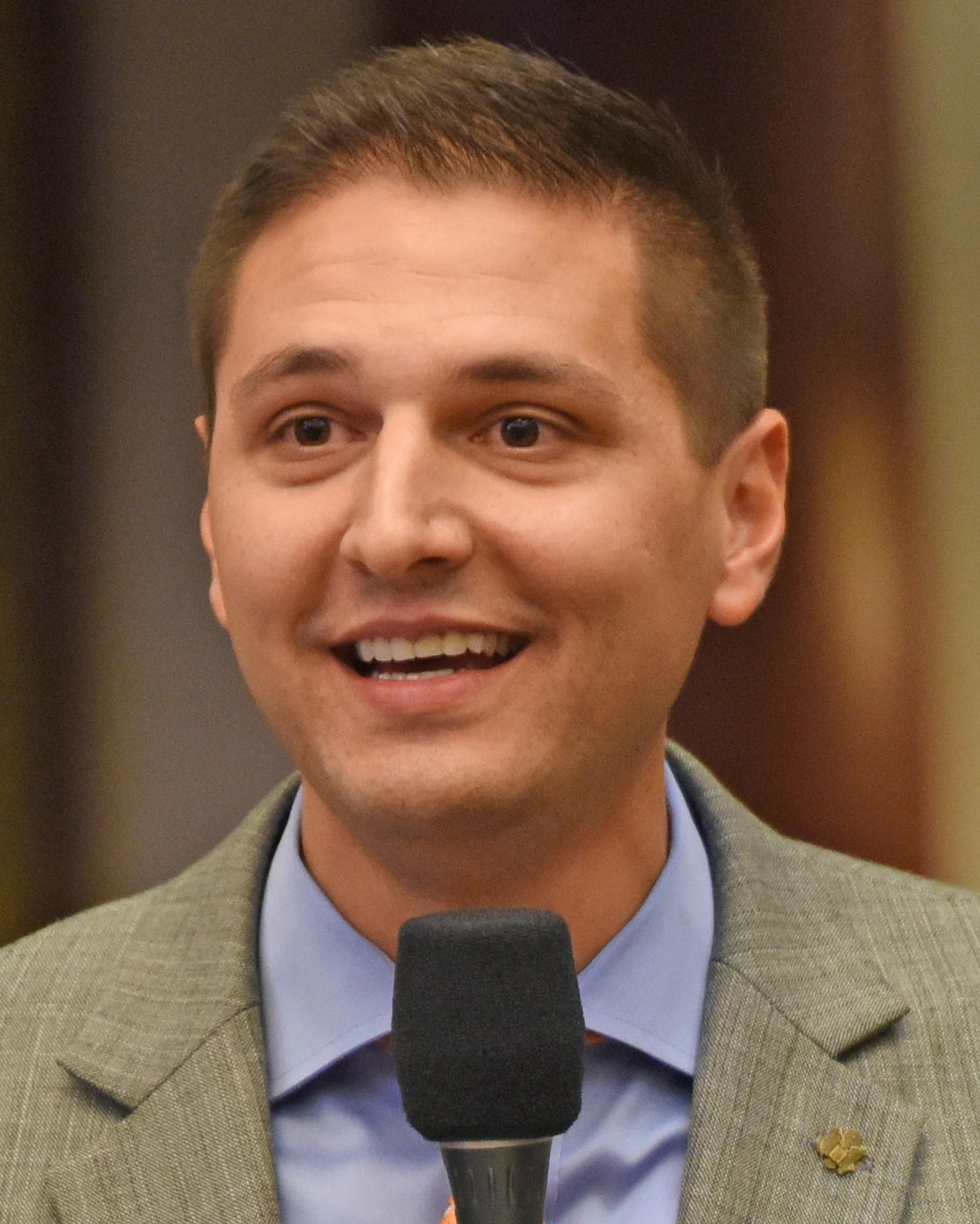

Nominee	Danny Burgess	Michael Harvey
Party	Republican	Democratic
Popular vote	123,217	71,786
Percentage	63.19%	36.81%
- Precinct results Paylan: 50–60% 60–70% 70–80% 80–90% >90% Rouson: 50–60% 60–70% 70–80% Tie: 50%
Senator before election
Danny Burgess
Republican
Elected Senator
Danny Burgess
Republican

The incumbent was Republican Danny Burgess, who ran for re-election.

=== Republican primary ===
- Danny Burgess, incumbent state senator

==== Results ====
2022 Florida Senate Republican primary, 23rd District
Party	Candidate	Votes	%
Republican	Danny Burgess (incumbent)	Unopposed	
Total votes		N/A	100.0

=== Democratic primary ===
- Michael Harvey, pilot

==== Results ====
2022 Florida Senate Democratic primary, 23rd District
Party	Candidate	Votes	%
Democratic	Michael Harvey	Unopposed	
Total votes		N/A	100.0

=== General election ===
==== Endorsements ====
Danny Burgess

Newspapers

- Tampa Bay Times

Organizations

- Florida Chamber of Commerce

==== Results ====
General election
Party	Candidate	Votes	%
Republican	Danny Burgess (incumbent)	123,217	63.19%
Democratic	Michael Harvey	71,786	36.81%
Total votes		195,003	100%
Republican hold			

== District 24 ==
2022 Florida Senate District election 24
- November 8, 2022
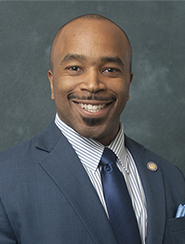

Nominee	Bobby Powell	Eric Ankner
Party	Democratic	Republican
Popular vote	76,693	60,958
Percentage	55.72%	44.28%
- Precinct results Powell: 50–60% 60–70% 70–80% 80–90% >90% Ankner: 50–60% 60–70% 70–80% 80–90% >90% No votes: Tie: 50%
Senator before election
Bobby Powell
Democratic
Elected Senator
Bobby Powell
Democratic

The incumbent was Democrat Bobby Powell, who ran for re-election.

=== Democratic primary ===
- Bobby Powell, incumbent state senator

==== Results ====
2022 Florida Senate Democratic primary, 24th District
Party	Candidate	Votes	%
Democratic	Bobby Powell (incumbent)	Unopposed	
Total votes		N/A	100.0

=== Republican primary ===
- Eric Ankner, retired correctional officer

==== Results ====
2022 Florida Senate Republican primary, 24th District
Party	Candidate	Votes	%
Republican	Eric Ankner	Unopposed	
Total votes		N/A	100.0

=== General election ===
==== Endorsements ====
Bobby Powell

Labor unions

- 1199SEIU United Healthcare Workers East

Organizations

- Sierra Club

==== Results ====
General election
Party	Candidate	Votes	%
Democratic	Bobby Powell (incumbent)	76,693	55.72%
Republican	Eric Ankner	60,958	44.28%
Total votes		137,651	100%
Democratic hold			

== District 25 ==
2022 Florida Senate District election 25
- November 8, 2022
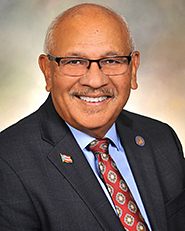

Nominee	Vic Torres	Peter Vivaldi
Party	Democratic	Republican
Popular vote	70,120	63,288
Percentage	52.6%	47.4%
- Precinct results Torres: 50–60% 60–70% 70–80% Vivaldi: 50–60% 60–70% 70–80% 80–90% No Data
Senator before election
Vic Torres
Democratic
Elected Senator
Vic Torres
Democratic

The incumbent was Democratic Vic Torres, who ran for re-election.

=== Democratic primary ===
- Vic Torres, incumbent state senator

==== Results ====
2022 Florida Senate Democratic primary, 25th District
Party	Candidate	Votes	%
Democratic	Vic Torres (incumbent)	Unopposed	
Total votes		N/A	100.0

=== Republican primary ===
- Peter Vivaldi, radio talk show host, nominee for this district in 2016, and candidate for Florida's 9th congressional district in 2014

==== Results ====
2022 Florida Senate Republican primary, 25th District
Party	Candidate	Votes	%
Republican	Peter Vivaldi	Unopposed	
Total votes		N/A	100.0

=== General election ===
==== Endorsements ====
Vic Torres

Labor unions

- 1199SEIU United Healthcare Workers East
- American Federation of State, County, and Municipal Employees

Organizations

- Equality Florida

==== Results ====
General election
Party	Candidate	Votes	%
Democratic	Vic Torres (incumbent)	70,120	52.56
Republican	Peter Vivaldi	63,288	47.44
Total votes		133,408	100%
Democratic hold			

== District 26 ==
2022 Florida Senate District election 26
- November 8, 2022
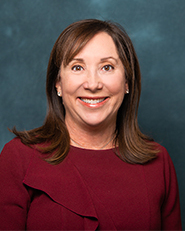

Nominee	Lori Berman	Steve Byers
Party	Democratic	Republican
Popular vote	122,532	101,072
Percentage	54.8%	45.2%
- Precinct results Berman: 50–60% 60–70% 70–80% 80–90% >90% Byers: 50–60% 60–70% 70–80% 80–90% >90% No votes: Tie: 50%
Senator before election
Lori Berman
Democratic
Elected Senator
Lori Berman
Democratic

The incumbent was Democrat Lori Berman, who ran for re-election.

=== Democratic nominee ===
- Lori Berman, incumbent state senator

=== Republican primary ===
==== Candidates ====
- Steve Byers, entrepreneur
- William Wheelen, retired stock trader

==== Results ====
Republican primary
Party	Candidate	Votes	%
Republican	Steve Byers	15,784	58.78%
Republican	William Wheelen	11,070	41.22%
Total votes		26,854	100%

=== General election ===
==== Endorsements ====
Lori Berman

Labor unions

- 1199SEIU United Healthcare Workers East

Organizations

- Equality Florida
- Sierra Club

==== Results ====
General election
Party	Candidate	Votes	%
Democratic	Lori Berman (incumbent)	122,532	54.80
Republican	Steve Byers	101,072	45.20
Total votes		223,604	100%
Democratic hold			

== District 27 ==
2022 Florida Senate District election 27
- November 8, 2022
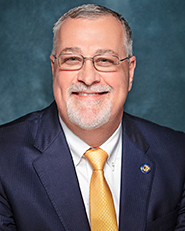

Nominee	Ben Albritton	Christopher Proia
Party	Republican	Democratic
Popular vote	141,045	56,940
Percentage	71.24%	28.76%
- Precinct results Albritton: 50–60% 60–70% 70–80% 80–90% >90% Proia: 50–60% 70–80% 80–90% >90% No votes
Senator before election
Ben Albritton
Republican
Elected Senator
Ben Albritton
Republican

The incumbent was Republican Ben Albritton, who ran for re-election.

=== Republican primary ===
- Ben Albritton, incumbent state senator

==== Results ====
2022 Florida Senate Republican primary, 27th District
Party	Candidate	Votes	%
Republican	Ben Albritton (incumbent)	Unopposed	
Total votes		N/A	100.0

=== Democratic primary ===
- Christopher Proia, trucker

==== Results ====
2022 Florida Senate Democratic primary, 27th District
Party	Candidate	Votes	%
Democratic	Christopher Proia	Unopposed	
Total votes		N/A	100.0

=== General election ===
==== Endorsements ====
Ben Albritton

Organizations

- Florida Chamber of Commerce

==== Results ====
General election
Party	Candidate	Votes	%
Republican	Ben Albritton (incumbent)	141,045	71.24
Democratic	Christopher Proia	56,940	28.76
Total votes		197,985	100%
Republican hold			

== District 28 ==
2022 Florida Senate District election 28
- November 8, 2022
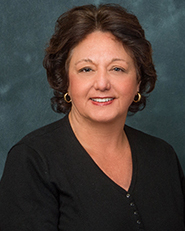
Nominee	Kathleen Passidomo (Uncontested)
Party	Republican
Senator before election
Kathleen Passidomo
Republican
Elected Senator
Kathleen Passidomo
Republican

The incumbent was Republican Kathleen Passidomo. Passidomo ran for re-election unopposed, so both the primary and general elections were canceled.

=== Republican nominee ===
- Kathleen Passidomo, incumbent state senator

==== Endorsements ====
Kathleen Passidomo

Organizations

- Florida Chamber of Commerce

=== General election ===
==== Results ====
General election
Party	Candidate	Votes	%
Republican	Kathleen Passidomo (incumbent)	Unopposed	
Total votes		—	—
Republican hold			

== District 29 ==
2022 Florida Senate District election 29
- November 8, 2022
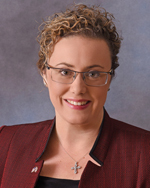
Nominee	Erin Grall (Uncontested)
Party	Republican
Senator before election
None
Elected Senator
Erin Grall
Republican

Due to redistricting, this is a new district with no incumbent. Only one candidate filed to run, so both the primary and general elections were canceled.

=== Republican nominee ===
- Erin Grall, state representative

==== Endorsements ====
Erin Grall

State legislators

- Ben Albritton, state senator
- Kathleen Passidomo, state senator
- Wilton Simpson, president of the Florida Senate

=== General election ===
==== Results ====
General election
Party	Candidate	Votes	%
Republican	Erin Grall	Unopposed	
Total votes		—	—
Republican hold			

== District 30 ==
2022 Florida Senate District election 30
- November 8, 2022
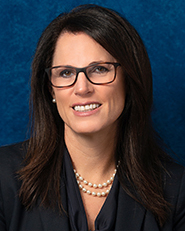

Nominee	Tina Polsky	William Reicherter
Party	Democratic	Republican
Popular vote	92,119	74,067
Percentage	55.4%	44.60%
- Precinct results Polsky: 50–60% 60–70% 70–80% 80–90% >90% Reicherter: 50–60% 60–70% 70–80% No votes/data
Senator before election
Tina Polsky
Democratic
Elected Senator
Tina Polsky
Democratic

The incumbent was Democrat Tina Polsky, who ran for re-election.

=== Democratic nominee ===
- Tina Polsky, incumbent state senator

=== Republican nominee ===
- William Reicherter, businessman

=== General election ===
==== Endorsements ====
Tina Polsky

Labor unions

- 1199SEIU United Healthcare Workers East
- American Federation of State, County, and Municipal Employees
- Florida AFL-CIO

Organizations

- Equality Florida
- Sierra Club

==== Results ====
General election
Party	Candidate	Votes	%
Democratic	Tina Polsky (incumbent)	92,119	55.43
Republican	William Reicherter	74,067	44.57
Total votes		166,186	100%
Democratic hold			

== District 31 ==
2022 Florida Senate District election 31
- November 8, 2022
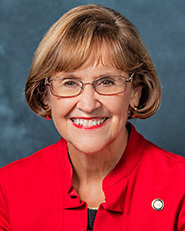
Nominee	Gayle Harrell (Uncontested)
Party	Republican
Senator before election
Gayle Harrell
Republican
Elected Senator
Gayle Harrell
Republican

The incumbent was Republican Gayle Harrell. Harrell ran for re-election unopposed, so both the primary and general elections were canceled.

=== Republican nominee ===
- Gayle Harrell, incumbent state senator

==== Endorsements ====
Gayle Harrell

Organizations

- Florida Chamber of Commerce

=== General election ===
==== Results ====
General election
Party	Candidate	Votes	%
Republican	Gayle Harrell (incumbent)	Unopposed	
Total votes		—	—
Republican hold			

== District 32 ==
2022 Florida Senate District election 32
- November 8, 2022
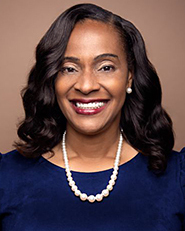
Nominee	Rosalind Osgood (Uncontested)
Party	Democratic
Senators before election
Lauren Book and Rosalind Osgood
Democratic
Elected Senators
Rosalind Osgood
Democratic

Due to redistricting, this district has two incumbents, Democrats Lauren Book and Rosalind Osgood. Book ran in the 35th district while Osgood ran for re-election in this district unopposed, so both the primary and general elections were canceled.

=== Democratic nominee ===
- Rosalind Osgood, incumbent state senator

==== Endorsements ====
Rosalind Osgood

Labor unions

- 1199SEIU United Healthcare Workers East
- Florida AFL-CIO

Organizations

- Sierra Club

==== Results ====
General election
Party	Candidate	Votes	%
Democratic	Rosalind Osgood (incumbent)	Unopposed	
Total votes		—	—
Democratic hold			

== District 33 ==
2022 Florida Senate District election 33
- November 8, 2022
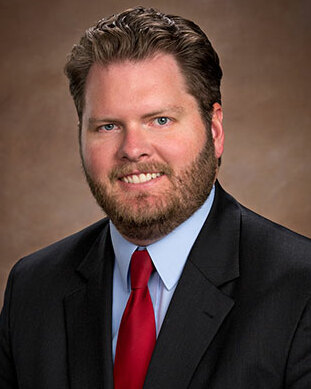
Nominee	Jonathan Martin
Party	Republican
Popular vote	149,922
Percentage	98.88%
- Precinct results Martin: 80–90% >90%
Senator before election
Ray Rodrigues
Republican
Elected Senator
Jonathan Martin
Republican

The incumbent was Republican Ray Rodrigues, who initially ran for re-election but later dropped out of the race.

=== Republican nominee ===
- Jonathan Martin, Florida SouthWestern State College trustee, chair of the Lee County Republican Party, and former Assistant State Attorney for the 20th Judicial Circuit of Florida

=== Independents ===
- Richard Valenta, educator (write-in)

=== General election ===
==== Endorsements ====
Jonathan Martin

Statewide politicians

- Ron DeSantis, Governor of Florida

State legislators

- Kathleen Passidomo, state senator
- Wilton Simpson, president of the Florida Senate

Organizations

- Americans for Prosperity

==== Results ====
General election
Party	Candidate	Votes	%
Republican	Jonathan Martin	149,922	98.88
Independent	Richard Valenta (write-in)	1,693	1.12
Total votes		151,615	100%
Republican hold			

== District 34 ==
2022 Florida Senate District 34
- November 8, 2022
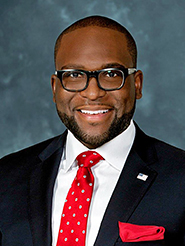
Nominee	Shevrin Jones (Uncontested)
Party	Democratic
Senator before election
Shevrin Jones
Democratic
Elected Senator
Shevrin Jones
Democratic

The incumbent was Democrat Shevrin Jones, who ran for re-election. Because no non-Democrats filed to run, the general election was canceled.

Democratic primary results by precinct Map legend: Shevrin—30–40%; Shevrin—40–50%; Shevrin—50–60%; Shevrin—60–70%; Shevrin—70–80%; Shevrin—80–90%; Shevrin—>90%; Ighodaro—40–50%; Escarment—>90%; Tie; No votes

=== Democratic primary ===
==== Candidates ====
- Pitchie Escarment, consultant
- Erhabor Ighodaro, former vice mayor of Miami Gardens and candidate for the 35th district in 2020
- Shevrin Jones, incumbent state senator

==== Endorsements ====
Shevrin Jones

State legislators

- Jason Pizzo, state senator

Local politicians

- Daniella Levine Cava, mayor of Miami-Dade County

Labor unions

- 1199SEIU United Healthcare Workers East

Organizations

- Equality Florida
- Human Rights Campaign
- LGBTQ Victory Fund
- National Organization for Women
- Sierra Club

==== Results ====
Democratic primary
Party	Candidate	Votes	%
Democratic	Shevrin Jones (incumbent)	37,640	68.1%
Democratic	Erhabor Ighodaro	9,445	17.1%
Democratic	Pitchie Escarment	8,216	14.9%
Total votes		55,301	100%

=== General election ===
==== Results ====
General election
Party	Candidate	Votes	%
Democratic	Shevrin Jones (incumbent)	Unopposed	
Total votes		—	—
Democratic hold			

== District 35 ==
2022 Florida Senate District election 35
- November 8, 2022
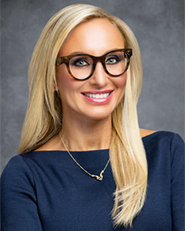
Nominee	Lauren Book (Uncontested)
Party	Democratic
Senator before election
None
Elected Senator
Lauren Book
Democratic

Due to redistricting, this is a new district with no incumbent. However, 32nd district incumbent Democrat Lauren Book decided to run here. Because no non-Democrats filed to run, the general election was canceled.

Democratic primary results by precinct Map legend: Book—50–60%; Book—60–70%; Book—70–80%; Sharief—50–60%; Sharief—60–70%; Sharief—>90%; No votes/data

=== Democratic primary ===
==== Candidates ====
- Lauren Book, state senator from the 32nd district
- Barbara Sharief, former mayor of Broward County and candidate for Florida's 20th congressional district in the 2022 special election

==== Endorsements ====
Lauren Book

Statewide politicians

- Bob Butterworth, former Florida Attorney General

State legislators

- Jason Pizzo, state senator

Labor unions

- 1199SEIU United Healthcare Workers East
- Florida AFL-CIO

Organizations

- EMILY's List
- Equality Florida
- Sierra Club

Newspapers

- Sun-Sentinel

==== Polling ====
Poll source	Date(s) administered	Sample size	Margin of error	Lauren Book	Barbara Sharief	Undecided
SEA Polling & Strategic Design (D) (Note: Poll sponsored by Book's campaign)	June 29 – July 1, 2022	400 (LV)	± 4.9%	39%	25%	36%

==== Results ====
Democratic primary
Party	Candidate	Votes	%
Democratic	Lauren Book (incumbent)	37,953	60.3%
Democratic	Barbara Sharief	24,944	39.7%
Total votes		62,897	100%

=== General election ===
==== Results ====
General election
Party	Candidate	Votes	%
Democratic	Lauren Book	Unopposed	
Total votes		—	—
Democratic hold			

== District 36 ==
2022 Florida Senate District 36
- November 8, 2022
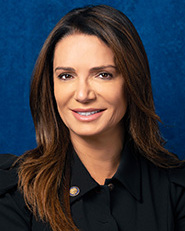

Nominee	Ileana Garcia	Raquel Pacheco
Party	Republican	Democratic
Popular vote	73,612	50,755
Percentage	59.19%	40.81%
- Precinct results Garcia: 50–60% 60–70% 70–80% 80–90% >90% Pacheco: 50–60% 60–70% 70–80% 80–90% >90% No votes: Tie: 50%
Senator before election
Ileana Garcia
Republican
Elected Senator
Ileana Garcia
Republican

The incumbent was Republican Ileana Garcia, who ran for re-election.

=== Republican nominee ===
- Ileana Garcia, incumbent state senator

=== Democratic nominee ===
- Raquel Pacheco, small business owner and U.S. Army National Guard veteran

=== General election ===
==== Predictions ====
Source	Ranking
CNalysis	Very Likely R

==== Endorsements ====
Ileana Garcia (R)

Organizations

- Florida Chamber of Commerce
Raquel Pacheco (D)

State legislators

- Lauren Book, minority leader of the Florida Senate

Organizations

- EMILY's List
- Equality Florida
- National Organization for Women
- VoteVets

==== Results ====
General election
Party	Candidate	Votes	%
Republican	Ileana Garcia (incumbent)	73,612	59.19
Democratic	Raquel Pacheco	50,755	40.81
Total votes		124,367	100%
Republican hold			

== District 37 ==
2022 Florida Senate District 37
- November 8, 2022
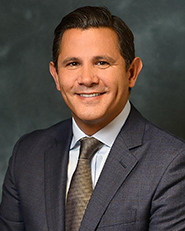
Nominee	Jason Pizzo (Uncontested)
Party	Democratic
Senators before election
Gary Farmer and Jason Pizzo
Democratic
Elected Senators
Jason Pizzo
Democratic

Due to redistricting, this district has two incumbents, Democrats Gary Farmer and Jason Pizzo. Farmer retired to run for circuit court judge while Pizzo ran for re-election unopposed, so both the primary and general elections were canceled.

=== Democratic nominee ===
- Jason Pizzo, incumbent state senator

==== Endorsements ====
Jason Pizzo

State legislators

- Loranne Ausley, state senator
- Lauren Book, minority leader of the Florida Senate
- Randolph Bracy, state senator
- Janet Cruz, state senator
- Shevrin Jones, state senator
- Rosalind Osgood, state senator
- Tina Polsky, state senator
- Bobby Powell, state senator
- Darryl Rouson, state senator
- Linda Stewart, state senator
- Vic Torres, state senator

Labor unions

- 1199SEIU United Healthcare Workers East
- American Federation of State, County, and Municipal Employees
- Florida AFL-CIO

Organizations

- Equality Florida

=== General election ===
==== Results ====
General election
Party	Candidate	Votes	%
Democratic	Jason Pizzo (incumbent)	Unopposed	
Total votes		—	—
Democratic hold			

== District 38 ==
2022 Florida Senate District election 38
- November 8, 2022
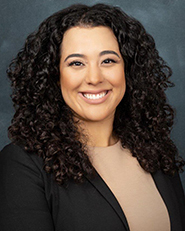

Nominee	Alexis Calatayud	Janelle Perez
Party	Republican	Democratic
Popular vote	93,726	78,595
Percentage	54.39%	45.61%
- Precinct results Calatayud: 50–60% 60–70% 70–80% 80–90% >90% Perez: 50–60% 60–70% 70–80% 80–90% >90% No votes: Tie: 50%
Senator before election
Annette Taddeo
Democratic
Elected Senator
Alexis Calatayud
Republican

The incumbent was Democrat Annette Taddeo, who was not running for re-election and was instead running for U.S. House.

=== Democratic nominee ===
- Janelle Perez, healthcare executive and former congressional aide

=== Republican nominee ===
- Alexis Calatayud, director of policy and programs at the Florida Department of Education

=== General election ===
==== Debate ====
2022 Florida's 38th Senate district debate
No.	Date	Host	Moderator	Link	Democratic	Republican
Key: P Participant A Absent N Not invited I Invited W Withdrawn						
Key: P Participant A Absent N Not invited I Invited W Withdrawn					Janelle Perez	Alexis Calatayud
1		WESH	Glenna Milberg; Michael Putney	WPLG	P	P

==== Predictions ====
Source	Ranking
CNalysis	Tilt D

==== Endorsements ====
Alexis Calatayud (R)

State legislators

- Ben Albritton, state senator
- Kathleen Passidomo, state senator
- Wilton Simpson, president of the Florida Senate

Organizations

- Americans for Prosperity
- Florida Chamber of Commerce
Janelle Perez (D)

U.S. representatives

- Debbie Mucarsel-Powell, former U.S. representative from Florida's 26th congressional district
- Donna Shalala, former U.S. representative from Florida's 27th congressional district

State legislators

- Lauren Book, minority leader of the Florida Senate
- Annette Taddeo, incumbent state senator for this district

Local officials

- Daniella Levine Cava, mayor of Miami-Dade County

Labor unions

- 1199SEIU United Healthcare Workers East
- American Federation of State, County, and Municipal Employees
- Service Employees International Union Florida
- South Florida AFL–CIO

Organizations

- EMILY's List
- Equality Florida
- Giffords PAC
- Human Rights Campaign
- LGBTQ Victory Fund
- Run for Something
- Sierra Club

==== Results ====
General election
Party	Candidate	Votes	%
Republican	Alexis Calatayud	93,726	54.39
Democratic	Janelle Perez	78,595	45.61
Total votes		172,321	100%
Republican gain from Democratic			

== District 39 ==
2022 Florida Senate District 39
- November 8, 2022
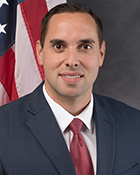
Nominee	Bryan Avila (Uncontested)
Party	Republican
Senator before election
Manny Díaz Jr.
Republican
Elected Senator
Bryan Avila
Republican

This seat was vacant at the time of the election, as Republican Manny Díaz Jr. resigned after being appointed Florida Commissioner of Education. Only one candidate filed to run, so both the primary and general elections were canceled.

=== Republican nominee ===
- Bryan Avila, state representative

==== Endorsements ====
Bryan Avila

Statewide politicians

- Ron DeSantis, Governor of Florida
- Manny Díaz Jr., Florida Commissioner of Education and former state senator from this district

Labor unions

- 1199SEIU United Healthcare Workers East

Organizations

- Americans for Prosperity
- Florida Chamber of Commerce

=== General election ===
==== Results ====
General election
Party	Candidate	Votes	%
Republican	Bryan Avila	Unopposed	
Total votes		—	—
Republican hold			

== District 40 ==
2022 Florida Senate District 40
- November 8, 2022
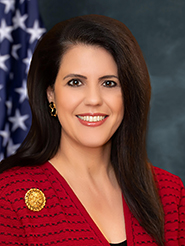
Nominee	Ana Maria Rodriguez (Uncontested)
Party	Republican
Senator before election
Ana Maria Rodriguez
Republican
Elected Senator
Ana Maria Rodriguez
Republican

The incumbent was Republican Ana Maria Rodriguez. Rodriguez ran for re-election unopposed, so both the primary and general elections were canceled.

=== Republican nominee ===
- Ana Maria Rodriguez, incumbent state senator

==== Endorsements ====
Ana Maria Rodriguez

Labor unions

- 1199SEIU United Healthcare Workers East

Organizations

- Americans for Prosperity
- Florida Chamber of Commerce

=== General election ===
==== Results ====
General election
Party	Candidate	Votes	%
Republican	Ana Maria Rodriguez (incumbent)	Unopposed	
Total votes		—	—
Republican hold			

== See also ==
- 2022 Florida elections
  - 2022 Florida House of Representatives election
- List of Florida state legislatures
- Politics of Florida
  - Political party strength in Florida
  - Florida Democratic Party
  - Republican Party of Florida
- Government of Florida

== Notes ==
Partisan clients
