= Senator Trumbull (disambiguation) =

Jonathan Trumbull Jr. (1740–1809) was a U.S. Senator from Connecticut from 1795 to 1796. Senator Trumbull may also refer to:

- Jay Trumbull (born 1989), Florida State Senate
- John H. Trumbull (1873–1961), Connecticut State Senate
- Lyman Trumbull (1813–1896), U.S. Senator from Illinois
