= Rob Bradley =

American politician

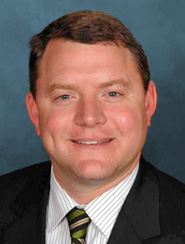

Member of the Florida Senate
- In office November 6, 2012 – November 3, 2020
- Preceded by: Redistricted
- Succeeded by: Jennifer Bradley
- Constituency: 7th district (2012–2016); 5th district (2016–2020)

Member of the Clay County Commission
- In office 2007–2008
- Preceded by: John E. Thrasher

Personal details
- Born: Robert Milner Bradley, Jr. August 24, 1970 (age 55) Green Cove Springs, Florida, U.S.
- Party: Republican
- Spouse: Jennifer Bradley
- Children: 3
- Education: University of Florida (BS, JD)

Robert Milner "Rob" Bradley, Jr. (born August 24, 1970 in Green Cove Springs, Florida) is a Republican politician from Florida. He served as a member of the Florida Senate, representing parts of North Central Florida from 2012 until he was term-limited in 2020. He currently chairs the St. Johns River Water Management District through March 2028.

== History ==
Bradley graduated from the University of Florida with a degree in telecommunications in 1992, and again with a Juris Doctor in 1996. Upon graduating from law school, he worked as an assistant state attorney in the Fourth Judicial Circuit of Florida until 1998, and then worked as a special magistrate for Green Cove Springs. In 2007, Bradley was appointed to the Clay County Commission by then-Governor Charlie Crist following the resignation of previous County Commissioner John E. Thrasher. He was re-elected in 2008 against write-in opposition, winning 96% of the vote. From 2009 to 2012, he served on the St. Johns River State College Board of Trustees, and currently works as the managing partner of Kopelousos, Bradley & Garrison, P.A., a law firm in Orange Park, Florida. He also launched a lobbying and consulting firm, Oak Strategies, in 2021 with legislative colleague Travis Cummings.

== Florida Senate ==
When the state's legislative districts were redrawn in 2012, Bradley opted to run in the newly created 7th District, and won the Republican primary unopposed. Advancing to the general election, he was opposed by Will Mazzota, the Democratic nominee and a University of Florida student who had his filing fee paid for by the Florida Democratic Party. Though the race was built up as a "Clay-vs.-Alachua County race," Bradley ended up defeating Mazzota with ease, winning 58% of the vote to Mazzota's 42%. In hindsight, Mazzota noted, "I think I put as much effort into it as I could have as a student and I'm proud of what I did," and Bradley pledged to focus on creating jobs and improving education in the legislature.

During the 2014 legislative session, Bradley was one of the three main Senate sponsors of legislation that allowed "severely epileptic children to seek relief legally by ingesting nonsmokable, low-THC medical marijuana." He noted that although he was opposed to legalizing marijuana, he was fully committed to helping "the desperate parents" of the children who have tried everything else.

After court-ordered redistricting, Bradley was redistricted in 2016 to the reconfigured 5th district. He was elected to that district, which encompasses Baker, Bradford, Clay, Columbia, Dixie, Gilchrist, Lafayette, Levy, Suwannee, and Union Counties, and part of western Marion County.
