= Florida's 2nd Senate district =

Florida Senate District

Florida's 2nd State Senate district
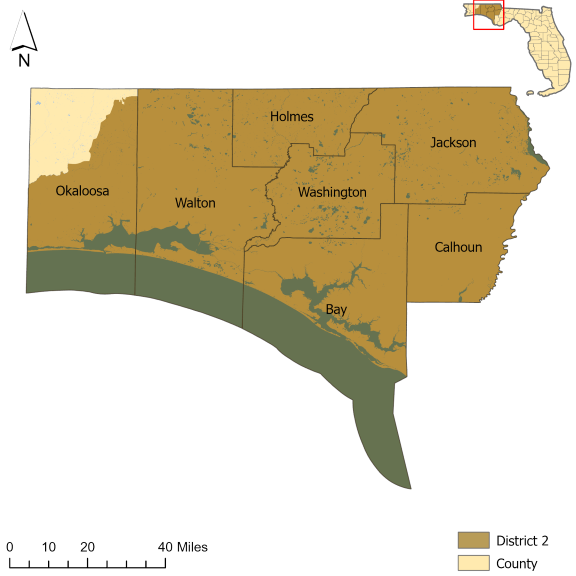
- Interactive map of district boundary since January 3, 2023
Senator
Jay Trumbull; R
- Demographics: 75.2% White; 10.2% Black; 8.1% Hispanic; 2.1% Asian; 0.6% Native American; 0.1% Hawaiian/Pacific Islander
- Population (2020): 526,550

Florida's 2nd Senate district elects one member of the Florida Senate. The district currently consists of Bay, Calhoun, Holmes, Jackson, Walton, Washington counties and part of Okaloosa county in the U.S. state of Florida. The current senator is Republican Jay Trumbull.

== List of senators ==
Registered voters as of the October 5, 2026 book closing
1. Republican (61.3%)
2. Democratic (17.6%)
3. Unaffiliated (17.3%)
4. IPF (2.07%)
5. Others (1.77%)

NOTE: The following information was gathered from the Florida Senate website. Only records of senators from 1998–present are kept.

Portrait	Name	Party	Years of service	Home city/state	Notes
	Betty S. Holzendorf	Democratic	1992–2002	Florida	Consisted of parts of Alachua, Clay, Duval, Putnam and St. Johns county
	Durell Peaden Jr.	Republican	2002–2010	DeFuniak Springs, Florida	Consisted of Holmes, Washington counties and parts of Bay, Escambia, Okaloosa, Santa Rosa, Walton counties
	Greg Evers	Republican	2010–2016	Milton, Florida	Consisted of Holmes, Washington counties and parts of Bay, Escambia, Okaloosa, Santa Rosa, Walton counties
	George B. Gainer	Republican	2016–2022	Jackson County, Florida	Consisted of Bay, Calhoun, Holmes, Jackson, Walton, Washington counties and part of Okaloosa county
	Jay Trumbull	Republican	2022–Present	Panama City, Florida	Consists of Bay, Calhoun, Holmes, Jackson, Walton, Washington counties and part of Okaloosa county

== Elections ==
NOTE: The following results were gathered from the Florida Department of State. Uncontested election results are not provided.

=== 1978 ===
General Election (1978)
Party	Candidate	Votes	%
Democratic	Edmond M. "Ed" Fortune	45,645	47.3%
Republican	Tom Tobiassen	50,791	52.7%
Total votes		96,436	100%

=== 1986 ===
Democratic Primary (1986)
Party	Candidate	Votes	%
Democratic	Bill Rosasco	16,514	37.2%
Democratic	Pat Thomas	27,904	62.8%
Total votes		44,418	100%

=== 1992 ===
Democratic Primary (1992)
Party	Candidate	Votes	%
Democratic	Warren H. Folks	7,688	20.4%
Democratic	Betty S. Holzendorf	29,975	79.6%
Total votes		37,663	100%

General Election (1992)
Party	Candidate	Votes	%
Democratic	Betty S. Holzendorf	62,117	60.5%
Non-Partisan Association	Phillip Brown	9,099	8.9%
Non-Partisan Association	Sandra Darling	31,328	30.5%
Write-In	Romero	44	0.0%
Total votes		102,588	100%

=== 1994 ===
Democratic Primary (1994)
Party	Candidate	Votes	%
Democratic	Phillip Brown	7,199	22.3%
Democratic	Betty S. Holzendorf	25,132	77.7%
Total votes		32,331	100%

=== 2010 ===
Republican Primary (2010)
Party	Candidate	Votes	%
Republican	Greg Evers	32,455	71.3%
Republican	Mike Hill	13,089	28.7%
Total votes		45,544	100%

General Election (2010)
Party	Candidate	Votes	%
Republican	Greg Evers	100,073	79.1%
Tea Party	Christopher S. Crawford	26,148	20.7%
Write-In	Margaret M. Smith	310	0.2%
Total votes		126,531	100%

=== 2018 ===
General Election (2018)
Party	Candidate	Votes	%
Republican	George B. Gainer	149,157	75.3%
Democratic	Mary Jeanne "Gigi" Gibson	48,979	24.7%
Total votes		198,136	100%

=== 2022 ===
Republican Primary (2022)
Party	Candidate	Votes	%
Republican	Regina Piazza	16,961	23.5%
Republican	Jay Trumbull	55,198	76.5%
Total votes		72,159	100%

General Election (2022)
Party	Candidate	Votes	%
Republican	Jay Trumbull	159,041	78.5%
Democratic	Carolynn Zonia	43,498	21.5%
Total votes		202,539	100%
