= Travis Hutson =

American politician

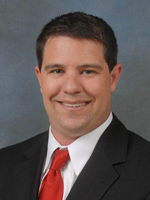

Member of the Florida Senate
- In office April 8, 2015 – November 5, 2024
- Preceded by: John E. Thrasher
- Succeeded by: Tom Leek
- Constituency: 6th district (2015–2016); 7th district (2016–2024)

Member of the Florida House of Representatives from the 24th district
- In office November 6, 2012 – April 6, 2015
- Preceded by: Redistricted
- Succeeded by: Paul Renner

Personal details
- Born: October 3, 1984 (age 42) Jacksonville, Florida
- Party: Republican
- Spouse: Tanya Hutson
- Education: Lafayette College (BS)
- Profession: Real estate agent

Travis Hutson (born October 3, 1984) is an American politician who served as a Republican member of the Florida Senate from 2015–2024. Hutson represented the 7th district, which includes Flagler, St. Johns, and northern Volusia County from 2016–2024. He previously represented the 6th district from 2015–2016. Hutson also served in the Florida House of Representatives from 2012 until he was elected to the Senate in 2015.

== History ==
Hutson was born in Jacksonville, and attended Pedro Menendez High School in southern St. Johns County, and then graduated from Lafayette College in Easton, Pennsylvania, where he met his wife and received a degree in economics. After graduating, he began work as a real estate agent, overseeing "the agricultural portfolio for his family's private real estate investment business, the Hutson Companies."

== Florida Legislature ==
In 2012, following the reconfiguration of the Florida House of Representatives districts, Hutson opted to run in the newly created 24th District. He won the Republican primary unopposed, and faced St. Johns County Commissioner Milissa Holland, the Democratic nominee, and Michael Cornish, an independent candidate, in the general election. The Florida Democratic Party supported Holland in the election, and sent out a mailer attacking Hutson for supporting the privatization of Medicare, which declared, "Travis Hutson, don't make our Medicare your voucher"; Hutson responded by noting, "It is unfortunate that [Democrats] are stretching my support for Governor Romney to mean I share all of his positions on issues, and further, it is outrageous that they are attempting to scare seniors over an issue that the state legislature doesn't control." In the end, Hutson ended up narrowly defeating Holland, winning 49% of the vote to her 47% and Cornish's 3%. Hutson was re-elected in 2014 to his second term in the House without opposition.

== Florida Senate ==
When State Senator John E. Thrasher announced that he would resign from the legislature to serve as the President of Florida State University, a special election was held to replace him. Hutson announced that he would run, as did fellow State Representative Ronald Renuart, and both submitted their resignations from the Florida House. They were joined in the primary by Dennis McDonald, a former candidate for the Flagler County Commission. Hutson started out with a significant financial advantage over Renuart after he transferred $300,000 from his House re-election campaign to his Senate campaign, and portrayed himself as the "true Conservative" in the race, noting his experience in the legislature of passing legislation on the economy and public safety. He campaigned on his opposition to legal gambling, noting that the communities around casinos "suffer tremendously," and on job creation, promising to directly lobby businesses to move into the district. During the campaign, Hutson was endorsed by State Attorney R. J. Larizza of the 7th Judicial Circuit, St. Johns County Sheriff David Shoar, Volusia County Sheriff Ben Johnson, and Commissioner of Agriculture Adam Putnam. Renuart, meanwhile, was endorsed by the Florida Times-Union, which praised Renuart's strong resume, and commended Hutson for his hard work on a number of issues. The Times-Union noted that, if not for Hutson's "extreme views on Medicaid," their endorsement would have been "a close call." Despite a tightly-fought campaign, Hutson ended up defeating his opponents by a wide margin, winning 52% of the vote to Renuart's 35% and McDonald's 13%.

Advancing to the general election, Hutson was opposed by David Cox, the Democratic nominee and a 2014 congressional candidate. Hutson campaigned on his support for legislation that would allow concealed-carry on college campuses, on his opposition to Medicaid expansion under the Patient Protection and Affordable Care Act, and on his ability to work with both parties. The St. Augustine Record, though praising Cox's strength as a candidate, endorsed Hutson for his experience in the legislature and on his deep knowledge of the issues. This time, Hutson was endorsed by the Times-Union, which observed, "[O]n issues other than expanding Medicaid — which he's regrettably refused to support as long as it involves the use of tax dollars — Hutson has actually been pretty reasonable and thoughtful." They specifically cited his support for closing loopholes on sexual predators, efficiently funding mental illness programs, and opening the Ocklawaha River. Once again, Hutson emerged victorious, defeating Cox in a landslide with nearly 70% of the vote.

Hutson's district was reconfigured and renumbered after court-ordered redistricting in 2016.

After the 2020 election, Hutson and other Republicans proposed changes to restrict voting rights in Florida. The proposed changes to restrict mail-in voting were notable given that Republicans had traditionally voted by mail more than Democrats, but Democrats outvoted Republicans by mail in 2020. There was no evidence of widespread fraud in U.S. elections or in Florida elections. Hutson defended the restrictions on voting, saying "I believe one fraudulent vote is one too many. And I’m trying to protect the sanctity of our elections." The Republican-controlled legislature passed the bill in 2022. The bill also banned Florida localities from having ranked-choice voting.

A bill in the 2022 session by Hutson would sharply limit homeowners' ability to file construction defect claims for hidden structural flaws. Senate Bill 736 dramatically reduces the time a home builder is responsible for construction defects. For single family homes, it cuts that time in half – from 10 years to five. It makes no exceptions for intentional fraud, or for violations of building and fire safety codes. Hutson’s father is a prominent Northeast Florida home builder. The Hutson Companies is currently building the massive SilverLeaf project in St. Johns County, which is ultimately expected to have more than 16,000 homes and 45 acres of retail space. Huston also works for the company. If passed, the bill would protect Hutson's family and other builders in Florida by making it easier to cut corners in construction and evade liability for violating building codes. This proposal from Huston comes less than a year after the Surfside Condominium collapsed due to latent defects. Families of the victims of the Surfside collapse are opposing the bill.
