= Florida's 33rd Senate district =

American legislative district

Florida's 33rd State Senate district
Senator
Jonathan Martin; R–Fort Myers

Florida's 33rd Senate district elects one member to the Florida State Senate. It contains parts of Lee County.

== Members ==
- Rosalind Osgood (2022)
- Jonathan Martin (since 2022)
