= Jonathan Martin (Florida politician) =

American politician (born 1981)

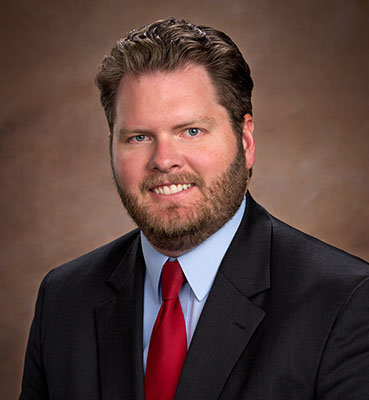

Member of the Florida Senate from the 33rd district
- Incumbent
- Assumed office November 8, 2022
- Preceded by: Rosalind Osgood

Personal details
- Born: Jonathan Allen Martin; December 19, 1981 (age 44) Cherokee, Iowa, U.S.
- Party: Republican
- Children: 3
- Education: Stetson University (BA, BS); Liberty University (JD)

Jonathan Allen Martin (born December 19, 1981) is an American politician serving as a member of the Florida Senate for the 33rd district. He assumed office on November 8, 2022.

== Early life and education ==
Martin was born in Cherokee, Iowa, and moved to Florida in 1986. He earned Bachelor of Arts and Bachelor of Science degrees from Stetson University and a Juris Doctor from the Liberty University School of Law.

== Career ==
From 2007 to 2014, Martin served as an assistant state attorney for the 20th Judicial Circuit Florida. From 2015 to 2022, he worked as an attorney at Parvey & Frankel Attorneys, P.A. He was also the chairman of the Lee County Republican Executive Committee. In August 2022, he became a partner at Aloia, Roland, Lubell & Morgan, PLLC. In November 2022, Martin was elected to the Florida Senate.
