= Greg Evers =

American politician

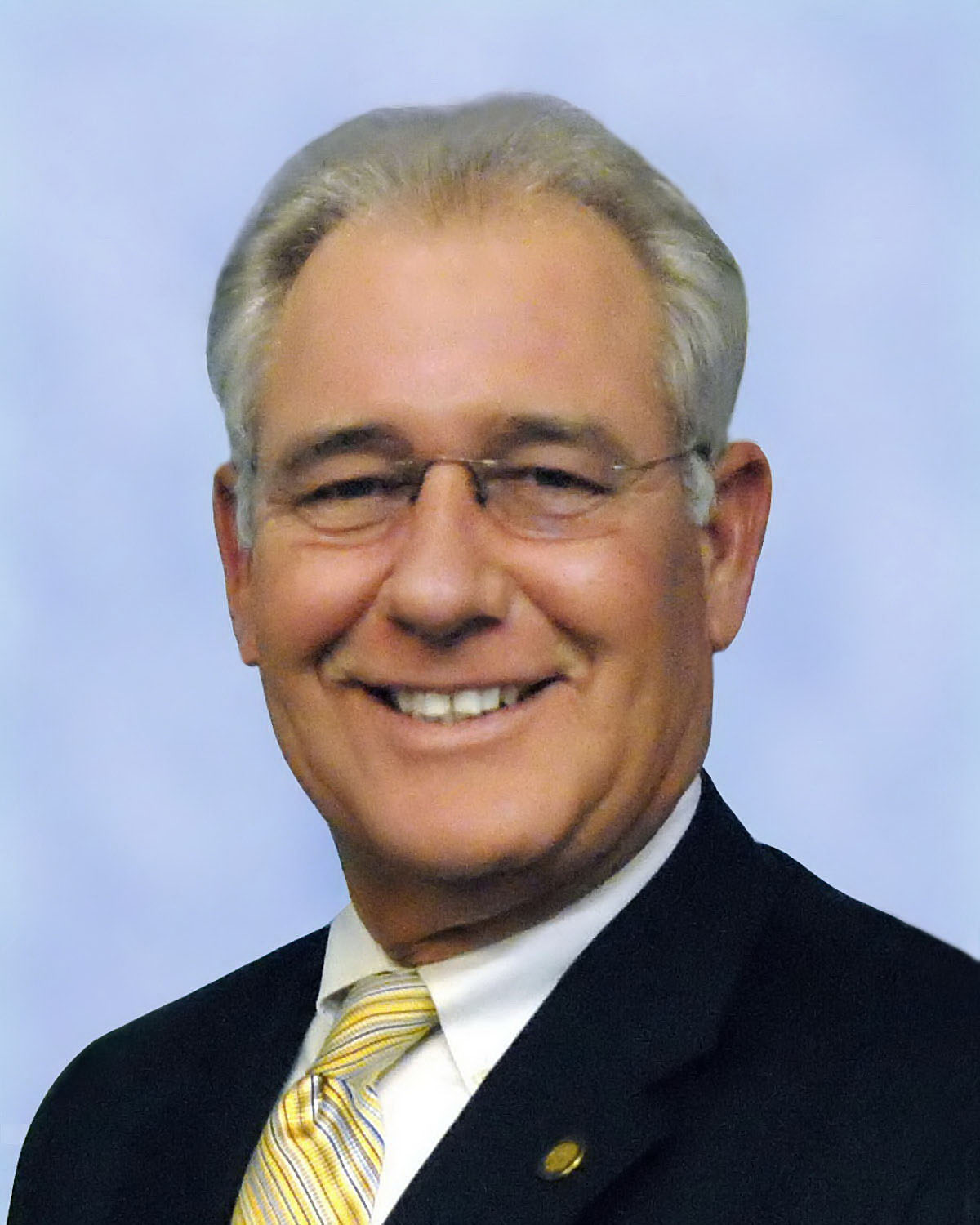
- Official portrait, 2009

Member of the Florida Senate from the 2nd district
- In office November 2, 2010 – November 8, 2016
- Preceded by: Durell Peaden
- Succeeded by: Redistricted

Member of the Florida House of Representatives from the 1st district
- In office October 22, 2001 – November 2, 2010
- Preceded by: Jeff Miller
- Succeeded by: Doug Broxson

Personal details
- Born: Robert Gregory Evers; June 16, 1955 Milton, Florida
- Died: August 21, 2017 (aged 62) Okaloosa County, Florida
- Party: Republican
- Education: Pensacola Junior College
- Profession: Farmer

Robert Gregory Evers (June 16, 1955 – August 21, 2017) was a Republican politician who served as a member of the Florida Senate from 2010 to 2016, representing parts of Northwest Florida. Prior to his election to the Senate, he served as a member of the Florida House of Representatives, representing the 1st District from 2001 to 2010.

== Background ==
Evers was born in Milton, Florida, and grew up on his family's farm, later attending Pensacola Junior College, and then eventually joining his family's fertilizer business. When he became the owner of the business, he moved it to Baker, where he started growing cotton, soybeans, peanuts, wheat, and corn.

== Florida House of Representatives ==
In 2001, when United States Congressman Joe Scarborough, who represented Florida's 1st congressional district, resigned, State Representative Jeff Miller ran in the special election to succeed him, and resigned from his seat in the legislature. A special election was called to replace Miller in the 1st District, which included northern Escambia County, northwestern Okaloosa County, and northern Santa Rosa County. Evers ran in the special election, and faced Mary Golden, the wife of State Attorney Curtis Golden; C. Robert Hilliard, an attorney; Donald Middlebrooks, a salesman; Jim Reeves, a former State Representative and Pensacola City Councilman; and Floyd Rose, a retired sheriff in the Republican primary. Hilliard ended up receiving a plurality of the vote in the initial primary election, receiving 27% of the vote to Evers' 25%, Reeves' 24%, Golden's 17%, Middlebrooks' 4%, and Rose's 2%, but because he did not receive a majority, a runoff election was held between Evers and Hilliard. In a close election, Evers narrowly defeated Hilliard, winning 54% of the vote to Hilliard's 46%. Advancing to the general election, Evers faced Eddie Cook, the Democratic nominee and a retired oil technician. Owing to the conservative nature of the district, Evers defeated Cook in a landslide, winning his first term in the legislature with 77% of the vote.

When Evers ran for re-election in 2002 to his first full term, he was challenged in the Republican primary by Santa Rosa County Commissioner Byrd Mapoles. During the campaign, Evers' daughter found the cell phone of Mapoles' son next to an Evers roadside campaign sign that had been knocked down, which resulted in a grand jury investigation that ultimately cleared Mapoles' son of criminal charges. Evers ended up defeating Mapoles handily, winning renomination with 73% of the vote. He was re-elected unopposed in the general election that year, and then again in 2004 and 2006. In 2008, he faced Ryan Gilbert in the Republican primary, but defeated him easily, winning renomination with 76% of the vote, and was re-elected in the general election without opposition.

== Florida Senate ==
When State Senator Durell Peaden was unable to seek re-election due to term limits, Evers ran to succeed him in the 2nd District, which stretched from Panama City to Pensacola and included northern Bay County, northern Escambia County, Holmes County, northern Okaloosa County, northern Santa Rosa County, northern Walton County, and Washington County. He was originally set to face fellow State Representative Dave Murzin in the Republican primary, but Murzin opted to run for a seat on the Escambia County Commission instead, so Evers faced Tea Party activist Mike Hill. Despite Hill racking up a number of local endorsements, Evers significantly outraised him, and ended up defeating him in a landslide, receiving 71% of the vote to Hill's 29%. In the general election, Evers was opposed by Christopher S. Crawford, the Tea Party nominee, and defeated him by a wide margin with 79% of the vote.

In 2012, following the reconfiguration of the state's legislative districts, the 2nd District was redrawn and made more compact, trading the reach down to Panama City for more of Escambia and Santa Rosa Counties. Evers ran for re-election, which he won unopposed. When he sought re-election in 2014, he won uncontested again.

Evers wrote a number of pieces of legislation concerning guns. Following the Marissa Alexander case, Evers wrote legislation that exempted certain acts of self-defense from a law that required twenty years of jail time if a gun was fired during the commission of certain felonies, and the bill was eventually signed into law by Governor Rick Scott. He also authored legislation, nicknamed the "Pop Tart" bill, that prevented schools from "disciplining students who play with simulated weapons", which was also signed into law. In 2015, Evers joined State Representative Greg Steube to author legislation that would have allowed individuals with concealed-carry permits to bring guns onto college and university campuses, but the bill ultimately died in the Florida Senate when the Chairman of the Senate Judiciary Committee, Miguel Díaz de la Portilla, refused to bring it up in committee.

== 2016 Congressional election ==
Evers announced that in 2016 he would run for election to Florida's 1st congressional district; the incumbent, Republican Jeff Miller, was not running for re-election. On August 30, 2016, Evers lost the Republican primary to State Representative Matt Gaetz by 21.5% to 35.7%.

== Death ==
Evers was killed in a single-vehicle automobile accident on August 21, 2017, near his home in Baker, Florida, when his car hit a guardrail, went into a creek and became fully submerged.

Florida House of Representatives
Preceded by Jeff Miller	Member of the Florida House of Representatives from the 1st district 2001–2010	Succeeded by Doug Broxson
Florida Senate
Preceded by Durell Peaden	Member of the Florida Senate from the 2nd district 2010–2016	Succeeded by George Gainer
