= Florida's 1st Senate district =

American legislative district

Florida's 1st State Senate district
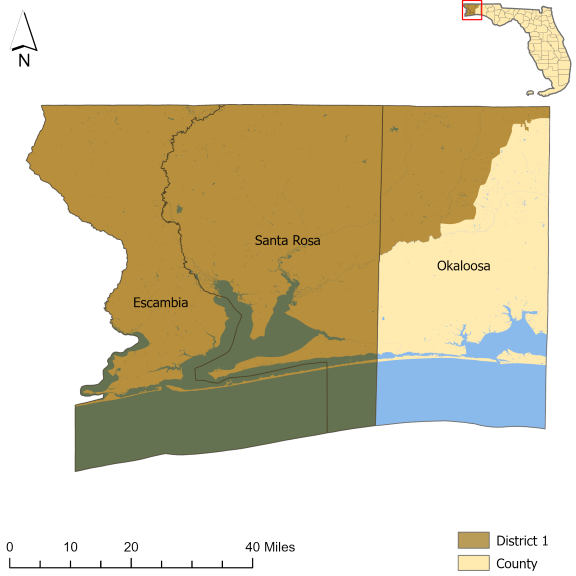
- Interactive map of district boundaries since January 3, 2023
Senator
Don Gaetz; R
- Demographics: 75.2% White; 16.9% Black; 4.8% Hispanic; 2.5% Asian; 0.9% Native American; 0.1% Hawaiian/Pacific Islander; 1.6% Other
- Population (2010): 473,945

Florida's 1st Senate District is a legislative district which elects members to the Florida Senate. It encompasses all of Escambia County, Santa Rosa County, and part of Okaloosa County. The district is currently represented by Republican Don Gaetz.

== List of senators ==
Registered voters as of the October 5, 2026 book closing
1. Republican (55.1%)
2. Democratic (22.5%)
3. Unaffiliated (18.6%)
4. IPF (2.17%)
5. Others (1.62%)

NOTE: The following information was gathered from the Florida Senate website. Only records of senators from 1998–present are kept.

Portrait	Name	Party	Years of service	Home city/state	Notes
	W. D. Childers	Democratic	1988–2000	Wright, Florida	Consisted of Holmes, Washington, parts of Bay, Escambia, Okaloosa, Santa Rosa and Walton county
	Durell Peaden	Republican	2000–2002	DeFuniak Springs, Florida	Consisted of Holmes, Washington, parts of Bay, Escambia, Okaloosa, Santa Rosa and Walton county
	Tony Hill	Democratic	2002–2011	Jacksonville, Florida	Consisted of parts of Duval, Flagler, Putnam, St. Johns, Volusia counties; Resigned 10/1/2011
	Audrey Gibson	Democratic	2011–2012	Jacksonville, Florida	Consisted of parts of Duval, Flagler, Putnam, St. Johns, Volusia counties; Elected 10/18/2011
	Don Gaetz	Republican	2012–2016	Rugby, North Dakota	Consisted of Bay, Holmes, Jackson, Walton, Washington counties and part of Okaloosa county; President (2012–2014)
	Doug Broxson	Republican	2016–2024	Pensacola, Florida	Consists of Escambia, Santa Rosa counties and part of Okaloosa county
	Don Gaetz	Republican	2024–present	Rugby, North Dakota	Consists of Escambia, Santa Rosa counties and part of Okaloosa county

== Elections ==
NOTE: The following results were gathered from the Florida Department of State. Uncontested election results are not provided.

=== 1988 ===
Democratic Primary (1988)
Party	Candidate	Votes	%
Democratic	W. D. Childers	26,286	56.1%
Democratic	Jim Cronley	20,583	43.9%
Total votes		46,869	100%

General Election (1988)
Party	Candidate	Votes	%
Democratic	W. D. Childers	59,190	63.6%
Republican	Lee McKnight	33,932	36.4%
Total votes		93,122	100%

=== 1992 ===
Democratic Primary (1992)
Party	Candidate	Votes	%
Democratic	W. D. Childers	41,932	68.8%
Democratic	Victor Kolmetz	19,050	31.2%
Total votes		60,982	100%

General Election (1992)
Party	Candidate	Votes	%
Democratic	W. D. Childers	71,856	60.1%
Republican	Jason Harvey	47,694	39.9%
Total votes		119,550	100%

=== 2002 ===
Democratic Primary (2002)
Party	Candidate	Votes	%
Democratic	Tony Hill	30,727	61.3%
Democratic	E. Denise Lee	19,360	38.7%
Total votes		50,087	100%

=== 2008 ===
General Election (2008)
Party	Candidate	Votes	%
Democratic	Tony Hill	136,354	81.2%
Constitution	Louis J. Tart	31,586	18.8%
Total votes		167,940	100%

=== 2016 ===
Republican Primary (2016)
Party	Candidate	Votes	%
Republican	Doug Broxson	34,078	56.5%
Republican	Mike Hill	26,221	43.5%
Total votes		60,299	100%

General Election (2016)
Party	Candidate	Votes	%
Republican	Doug Broxson	199,929	99.8%
Write-In	Aaron Matthew Erskine	46	0.0%
Write-In	Miriam Woods	349	0.2%
Total votes		200,324	100%

=== 2022 ===
Republican Primary (2022)
Party	Candidate	Votes	%
Republican	Doug Broxson	54,015	75.6%
Republican	John Mills	17,459	24.4%
Total votes		71,474	100%

General Election (2022)
Party	Candidate	Votes	%
Republican	Doug Broxson	145,155	71.2%
Democratic	Charlie Nichols	58,724	28.8%
Total votes		203,879	100%

=== 2024 ===
General Election (2024)
Party	Candidate	Votes	%
Republican	Don Gaetz	187,431	64.6%
Democratic	Lisa Newell	102,905	35.4%
Total votes		290,336	100%
