= John Thrasher (Florida politician) =

American politician (1943–2025)

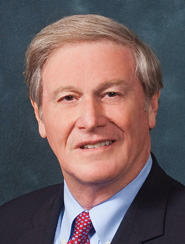
- Thrasher in 2009

15th President of Florida State University
- In office November 10, 2014 – August 15, 2021
- Preceded by: Eric J. Barron
- Succeeded by: Richard McCullough

Member of the Florida Senate
- In office October 7, 2009 – November 7, 2014
- Preceded by: Jim King
- Succeeded by: Travis Hutson
- Constituency: 8th district (2009–2012); 6th district (2012–2014)

Chair of the Republican Party of Florida
- In office February 2010 – January 2011
- Preceded by: Jim Greer
- Succeeded by: David Bitner

90th Speaker of the Florida House of Representatives
- In office November 17, 1998 – November 21, 2000
- Preceded by: Daniel Webster
- Succeeded by: Tom Feeney

Member of the Florida House of Representatives from the 19th district
- In office 1992–2000
- Preceded by: Joseph "Joe" Arnall
- Succeeded by: Dick Kravitz

Personal details
- Born: December 18, 1943 Columbia, South Carolina, U.S.
- Died: May 30, 2025 (aged 81) Orlando, Florida, U.S.
- Party: Republican
- Spouse: Jean Thrasher
- Children: 3
- Education: Florida State University (BS, JD)
- Profession: Politician; attorney; businessman; lobbyist

Military service
- Allegiance: United States
- Branch/service: United States Army
- Years of service: 1966–1970
- Rank: Captain
- Battles/wars: Vietnam War
- Awards: Bronze Star Medal (2); Army Commendation Medal

John E. Thrasher (December 18, 1943 – May 30, 2025) was an American politician and state legislator in Florida. He was a businessman, lawyer, and lobbyist who served as the 15th president of Florida State University. He was approved by the Florida Board of Governors on November 6, 2014, and took office on November 10, 2014. On September 11, 2020, Thrasher and the university board of trustees announced his retirement in a joint statement. In May 2021, Richard McCullough was chosen by Florida State University's board of trustees to succeed Thrasher.

== Early life and education ==
John Thrasher was born in Columbia, South Carolina, on December 18, 1943. He grew up in Jacksonville, Florida, and earned his bachelor's degree in business from Florida State University in 1965. As an undergraduate, he was a member of Sigma Phi Epsilon fraternity. After college, he joined the United States Army, serving first in Germany, where he received the Commendation Medal, and later in Vietnam, where he was awarded two Bronze Stars. Thrasher attained the rank of captain before his honorable discharge in 1970. He returned to Tallahassee and earned a Juris Doctor degree with honors from the Florida State University College of Law in 1972.

== Political career ==
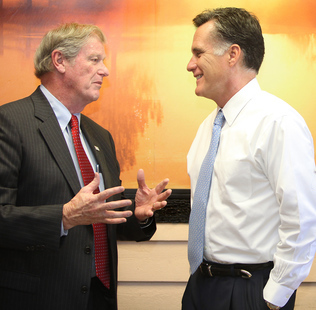
Thrasher with Mitt Romney in 2011

Thrasher began his political career in 1986 with his election to the Clay County School Board. He served as vice chairman, then chairman of the board before running for the Florida House of Representatives. He was elected in 1992 and was re-elected without opposition in 1994, 1996 and 1998. In 2009, he was elected to the Florida Senate in a special election to represent the 8th District, which included parts of the counties of Duval, Flagler, Nassau, St. Johns and Volusia. After redistricting in 2012, he represented the 6th District which included all of the counties of St. Johns, Flagler, Putnam, as well as parts of Volusia County.

=== Speaker of the Florida House of Representatives ===
On November 17, 1998, Thrasher was unanimously elected as Speaker of the House for the 1999 through 2000 term, which passed legislation including "Three Strikes, You're Out", "10-20-Life", "A+ Education Plan", and the largest tax cut in Florida history. Thrasher was cited on two separate occasions for violating Florida state ethics laws during and following his terms as a state representative. He was fined for both violations.

=== Political campaigns ===
On September 15, 2009, Thrasher won the special Republican Primary election to succeed the late Senator Jim King. Thrasher defeated Ponte Vedra political activist Dan Quiggle, Jacksonville City Councilman Art Graham and former House Member Stan Jordan by garnering 39% or 13,247 votes in a four-way race. Thrasher later claimed official victory after the general election on October 6, 2009.

In 2010, Thrasher defeated Charles Perniciaro in the Republican Primary by a vote of 61.8% to 38.2% and later Democrat Deborah Gianoulis, a retired television anchor, by a vote of 60.01% to 39.93% in the general election on November 2, 2010.

=== Florida Senate ===
While in the Florida Senate, Thrasher served as the chairman of the Rules Committee and the vice-chair of the Budget Subcommittee on Higher Education Appropriations. Additionally, he served on the Budget, Budget Subcommittee on Criminal and Civil Justice Appropriations, Community Affairs, Judiciary, Reapportionment, Regulated Industries, and Rules Subcommittee on Ethics and Elections.

== Chairman of the Republican Party of Florida ==
Within weeks of the resignation of disgraced chairman Jim Greer, Thrasher was recruited to be the next chair. With the backing of his longtime ally, former governor Jeb Bush, he won easily his election to become the next chairman of the Republican Party of Florida and promised to improve transparency, communications and relationships with party activists, and to raise $1 million in six weeks. However he was criticized for signing a secret severance agreement for Jim Greer, who subsequently went to prison.

Under Thrasher's leadership, the party raised $54.7 million, easily topping the $50.8 million raised during the three Greer years and helped deliver a slew of victories at the ballot box.

Under his tenure, the party swept the Florida Cabinet races, picked up four U.S. House seats, won a U.S. Senate race and delivered a two-thirds majority in the Legislature. It also survived a nasty gubernatorial primary and won a tight victory in the general election.

== President of Florida State University ==
On April 2, 2014, Eric J. Barron assumed the presidency of Pennsylvania State University after serving as Florida State University's president for four years. He was succeeded by the university's provost, Garnett S. Stokes. In September 2014, Thrasher was appointed by the board of trustees of FSU by a vote of 11–2 to become the institution's 15th president. The appointment was approved by the Florida Board of Governors on November 6, 2014. On March 17, 2015, he was formally confirmed to the position at an investiture ceremony held at the school. Thrasher was an alumnus of FSU.

== Death ==
Thrasher died from cancer in Orlando, Florida, on May 30, 2025, at the age of 81.

== See also ==
- List of Florida State University people
- List of presidents of Florida State University

Florida House of Representatives
Preceded by Joseph "Joe" Arnall	Member of the Florida House of Representatives from the 19th district 1992–2000	Succeeded by Dick Kravitz
Preceded by Daniel Webster	Speaker of the Florida House of Representatives; 1998–2000	Succeeded by Tom Feeney
Florida Senate
Preceded by Jim King	Member of the Florida Senate from the 8th district 2009–2012	Succeeded by Dorothy Hukill
Preceded by Bill Montford	Member of the Florida Senate from the 6th district 2012–2014	Succeeded by Travis Hutson
Party political offices
Preceded by Jim Greer	Chair of the Florida Republican Party; 2010–2011	Succeeded by David Bitner
Academic offices
Preceded by Garnett S. Stokes	President of Florida State University; 2014–2021	Succeeded by Richard McCullough
