= Jennifer Bradley =

American politician

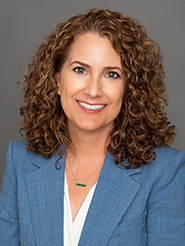

Member of the Florida Senate
- Incumbent
- Assumed office November 3, 2020
- Preceded by: Rob Bradley
- Constituency: 5th district (2020–2022); 6th district (2022–present)

Personal details
- Born: September 22, 1970 (age 55) Tachikawa, Japan
- Party: Republican
- Spouse: Rob Bradley
- Children: 3
- Education: University of Florida (BA in criminology); Florida State University (JD)

Jennifer Bradley is an American politician who has served as a Republican member of the Florida Senate since 2020. She represents the 6th district, encompassing Baker, Bradford, Clay, Columbia, Gilchrist, and Union Counties, and part of Alachua County.

== Electoral history ==
=== 2020 State Senate Election ===
Republican primary results
Party	Candidate	Votes	%
Republican	Jennifer Bradley	47,395	59.0%
Republican	Jason G. Holifield	32,944	41.0%
Total votes		80,339	100.0%

General Election results
Party	Candidate	Votes	%
Republican	Jennifer Bradley	194,198	74.8%
Democratic	Stacey L. Peters	65,568	25.2%
Total votes		259,766	100.0%
