= Doug Broxson =

American politician

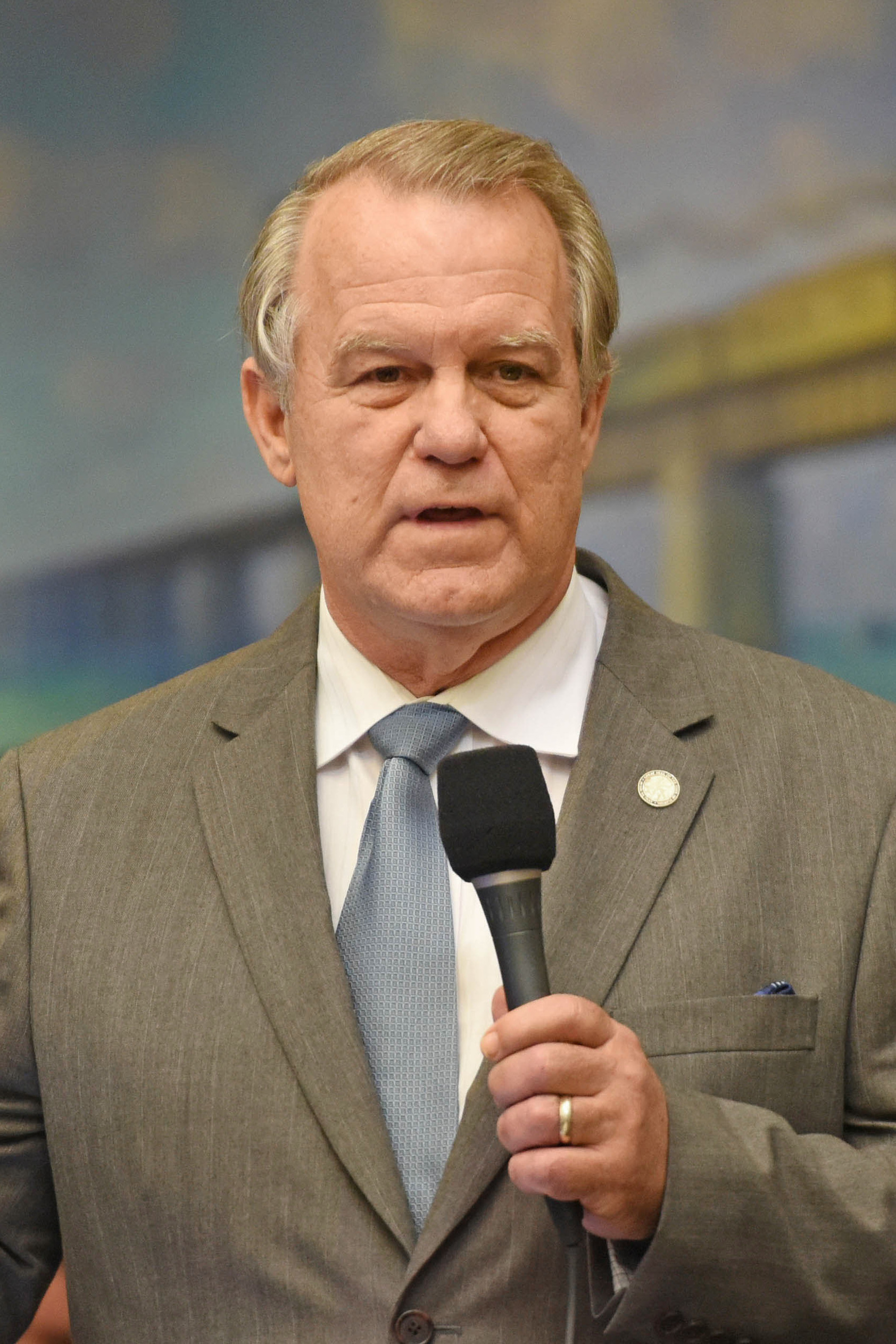

Member of the Florida Senate from the 1st district
- In office November 8, 2016 – November 19, 2024
- Preceded by: Redistricted
- Succeeded by: Don Gaetz

Member of the Florida House of Representatives
- In office November 2, 2010 – November 8, 2016
- Preceded by: Greg Evers
- Succeeded by: Jayer Williamson
- Constituency: 1st district (2010–2012); 3rd district (2012–2016)

Personal details
- Born: Douglas Vaughn Broxson; March 10, 1949 (age 77) Pensacola, Florida, U.S.
- Party: Republican
- Spouse: Mary
- Children: Julie Giles, Jason Broxson, Juddsen Broxson, Marian Jill Teston
- Relatives: John Broxson (brother)
- Education: Evangel University (BS)
- Occupation: Insurance and Real Estate
- Profession: Insurance agent
- Committees: Appropriations (Chair), Appropriations Committee on Education, Banking, Insurance, Finance and Tax, Judiciary, Rules, Transportation, Joint Legislative Budget Commission (Alternating Chair)

Douglas Vaughn Broxson (born March 10, 1949) is an American politician who was a Republican member of the Florida Senate, representing the 1st district, which includes Escambia, Santa Rosa, and part of Okaloosa Counties in the Florida Panhandle, from 2016 to 2024. He previously served in the Florida House of Representatives, representing northern Okaloosa County and Santa Rosa County from 2010 to 2016.

== History ==
Broxson was born in Pensacola. After attending Pensacola Junior College, Broxson transferred to Evangel University in Springfield, Missouri, where he met his wife, Mary, and graduated in 1971. He moved back to Florida and raised his family, starting a career in real estate and insurance sales.

== Florida Legislature ==
=== House of Representatives ===
In 2010, when incumbent state representative Greg Evers could not seek re-election due to term limits, instead successfully running for the Florida State Senate, Broxson ran to succeed him in the Republican primary in the 1st District, which included northern Escambia County, northwestern Okaloosa County, and Santa Rosa County. He faced Greg Brown, Ferdinand Salomon, and Ricky Perritt, whom he defeated with 45% of the vote. In the general election, Broxson won a landslide victory against independent candidate Matthias Venditto, receiving 84% of the vote.

When Florida House districts were reconfigured in 2012, Broxson ran in the newly created 3rd District, which included most of the territory that he had represented in the 1st District but dropped the sections of Escambia County in favor of a greater slice of Okaloosa County. He faced Jayer Williamson, the son of Santa Rosa County commissioner Jim Williamson, in the Republican primary, and won with 58% of the vote. He did not face an opponent in the general election.

While serving in the legislature, Broxson supported legislation that would allow communities "to fine motorists who play their car stereos too loudly" despite concerns that it would lead to racial discrimination, noting, "This has been an existing law for a long time. Let's don't make it more than it is. It's worked for years. It's given them the ability to keep peace in the cities [and] keep our neighborhoods quiet and peaceful."

In 2014, Broxson was challenged in the Republican primary by Jamie Smith, a Tea Party activist and veteran. He campaigned on his conservative record in the legislature of reducing government regulation and spending, saying, "[The legislature] stood up against Obamacare and did everything good Republicans are supposed to do." Broxson said that, in his third term, he would focus on leading the charge on additional tax reform." He ended up defeating Smith in a landslide, winning 70% of the vote, and advanced to the general election, where he only faced write-in opposition and won re-election easily.

=== Senate ===
In 2016, Broxson again succeed Greg Evers when Evers opted to run unsuccessfully for Florida's 1st congressional district rather than seek re-election in his reconfigured Senate district. Broxson defeated fellow state representative Mike Hill in the Republican primary and two write-in candidates in the general election.

On March 3, 2018, Broxson rejected a two-year moratorium on the sale of AR-15s.

== Election history ==
=== 2010 ===
Florida House District 1 – Republican Primary (2010)
Party	Candidate	Votes	%
Republican	Doug Broxson	8,917	44.9%
Republican	Greg Brown	5,774	21.9%
Republican	Ferd Salomon	4,340	21.8%
Republican	Ricky G. Perritt	845	4.3%
Total votes		19,876	100%

Florida House District 1 – General Election (2010)
Party	Candidate	Votes	%
Republican	Doug Broxson	42,232	84.2%
Independent	Mathias Venditto	7,901	15.8%
Total votes		50,133	100%

=== 2012 ===
Florida House District 3 – Republican Primary (2012)
Party	Candidate	Votes	%
Republican	Doug Broxson	11,609	58.2%
Republican	Greg Brown	8,347	41.8%
Total votes		19,956	100%

Florida House District 3 – General Election (2012)
Party	Candidate	Votes	%
Republican	Doug Broxson	65,071	99.8%
Write-In	Margaret "Peggi" Smith	100	0.2%
Total votes		65,171	100%

=== 2014 ===
Florida House District 3 – Republican Primary (2014)
Party	Candidate	Votes	%
Republican	Doug Broxson	10,074	69.9%
Republican	Jamie Smith	4,340	30.1%
Total votes		14,414	100%

Florida House District 3 – General Election (2014)
Party	Candidate	Votes	%
Republican	Doug Broxson	47,610	99.9%
Write-In	John Daniel Melvin	43	0.1%
Total votes		47,653	100%

=== 2016 ===
Florida Senate District 1 – Republican Primary (2016)
Party	Candidate	Votes	%
Republican	Doug Broxson	34,078	56.5%
Republican	Mike Hill	26,221	43.5%
Total votes		14,414	100%

Florida Senate District 1 – General Election (2016)
Party	Candidate	Votes	%
Republican	Doug Broxson	199,929	99.8%
Write-In	Aaron Matthew Erskine	46	0.0%
Write-In	Miriam Woods	349	0.2%
Total votes		200,324	100%

=== 2022 ===
Florida Senate District 1 – Republican Primary (2022)
Party	Candidate	Votes	%
Republican	Doug Broxson	54,015	75.6%
Republican	John Mills	17,459	24.4%
Total votes		71,474	100%

Florida Senate District 1 – General Election (2022)
Party	Candidate	Votes	%
Republican	Doug Broxson	145,155	71.2%
Democratic	Charlie Nichols	58,724	28.8%
Total votes		200,324	100%

Florida House of Representatives
Preceded by Greg Evers	Member of the Florida House of Representatives from the 1st district 2010–2012	Succeeded by Clay Ingram
Preceded by Clay Ford	Member of the Florida House of Representatives from the 3rd district 2012–2016	Succeeded by Jayer Williamson
Florida Senate
Preceded by Don Gaetz	Member of the Florida Senate from the 1st district 2016–present	Incumbent
