= Jay Trumbull =

American politician (born 1989)

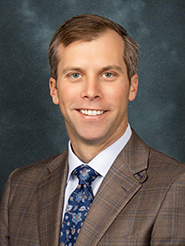
- Official portrait, 2022

Member of the Florida Senate from the 2nd district
- Incumbent
- Assumed office November 8, 2022
- Preceded by: George Gainer

Member of the Florida House of Representatives from the 6th district
- In office November 4, 2014 – November 8, 2022
- Preceded by: Jimmy Patronis
- Succeeded by: Philip Griffitts

Personal details
- Born: Jay Norbert Trumbull; February 21, 1989 (age 37) Panama City, Florida, U.S.
- Party: Republican
- Spouse: Brittany Fishel (m. 2011)
- Children: 3
- Education: Auburn University (BS)
- Website: State Senate website Campaign website

Jay Norbert Trumbull (born February 21, 1989) is an American politician who serves in the Florida Senate. He was a member of the Florida House of Representatives, representing the 6th District, which includes Panama City in southern Bay County, until 2022. He currently serves as a Senator for the 2nd district of Florida. He is a member of the Republican party.

== History ==
Trumbull was born in Panama City, Florida, and attended Bay High School and Auburn University, where he graduated with his bachelors degree in small business management and entrepreneurship. After graduation he worked for his family's bottled water and water conditioning business as part of the management team.

== Florida House of Representatives ==
In 2014, Trumbull ran to succeed incumbent State Representative Jimmy Patronis, who was unable to seek re-election due to term limits. He faced former Bay County School Board Member Thelma Rohan, Melissa Hagan, and Tho Bishop in the Republican primary, where he campaigned on his support for making Florida "the most business-friendly place in the country," which he said was achievable with lower taxes, less government regulation, and lawsuit reform.

Trumbull won the primary with 43% of the vote to Rohan's 24%, Hagan's 23%, and Bishop's 10%, and advanced to the general election, where he faced Jamie Shepard, the Democratic nominee, and Henry Newman Lawrence, the Green Party nominee. He campaigned as a supporter of lower taxes and reduced regulation, and voiced his opposition to the Common Core State Standards Initiative. Trumbull won the general election with 69% of the vote to Shepard's 28% and Newman's 3%.

== Elections ==
=== 2014 ===
Florida House District 6 – Republican Primary (2014)
Party	Candidate	Votes	%
Republican	Tho Bishop	1,526	9.8%
Republican	Melissa Hagan	3,617	23.3%
Republican	Thelma G. Rohan	3,668	23.7%
Republican	Jay Trumbull	6,698	43.2%
Total votes		15,509	100%

Florida House District 6 – General Election (2014)
Party	Candidate	Votes	%
Republican	Jay Trumbull	36,794	68.9%
Democratic	Jamie Shepard	14,960	28.0%
Green	Henry Newman Lawrence	1,606	3.0%
Write-In	Jerry Wyche	29	0.1%
Total votes		15,509	100%

=== 2016 ===
Elections for the Florida House of Representatives took place in 2016. The primary election took place on August 30, 2016, and the general election was held on November 8, 2016. The candidate filing deadline was June 24, 2016.

Incumbent Jay Trumball ran unopposed in the Florida House of Representatives District 6 Republican primary.

=== 2018 ===
Incumbent Jay Trumball ran unopposed in the Florida House of Representatives District 6 Republican primary.

Florida House District 6 – General Election (2018)
Party	Candidate	Votes	%
Republican	Jay Trumbull	50,543	99.5%
Write-In	William Davis	253	0.5%
Total votes		50,796	100%

=== 2020 ===
Florida House District 6 – Republican Primary (2020)
Party	Candidate	Votes	%
Republican	Steven Linne	4,915	24.4%
Republican	Jay Trumbull	15,256	75.6%
Total votes		20,171	100%

Florida House District 6 – General Election (2020)
Party	Candidate	Votes	%
Republican	Jay Trumbull	61,456	72.0%
Democratic	Alicia Bays	23,848	28.0%
Total votes		85,304	100%

=== 2022 ===
Florida Senate District 2 – Republican Primary (2022)
Party	Candidate	Votes	%
Republican	Regina Piazza	16,961	23.5%
Republican	Jay Trumbull	55,198	76.5%
Total votes		72,159	100%

Florida Senate District 2 – General Election (2022)
Party	Candidate	Votes	%
Republican	Jay Trumbull	159,041	78.5%
Democratic	Carolynn Zonia	43,498	21.5%
Total votes		202,539	100%
