= Florida's 6th Senate district =

Florida Senate district

Florida's 6th State Senate district
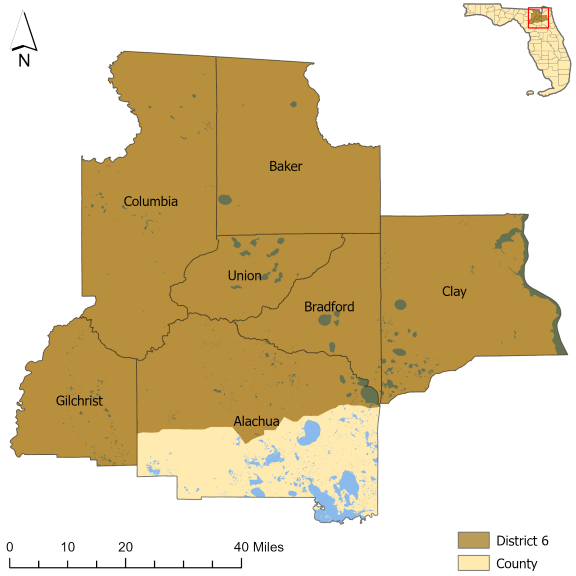
- Interactive map of district boundary since January 3, 2023
Senator
Jennifer Bradley; R
- Demographics: 39.2%% White; 43.4%% Black; 11.3%% Hispanic; 3.8%% Asian; 0.4%% Native American; 0.1%% Hawaiian/Pacific Islander
- Population (2020): 526,802
- Notes: Statistics gathered in 2020

Florida's 6th Senate district elects one member to the Florida Senate. The district consists of Baker, Bradford, Clay, Columbia, Gilchrist, Union counties, and part of Alachua county, in the U.S. state of Florida. The current senator is Republican Jennifer Bradley.

== List of senators ==
NOTE: The following information was gathered from the Florida Senate website. Only records of senators from 1998-present are kept.

Portrait	Name	Party	Years of service	Home city/state	Notes
	Jim Horne	Republican	1994–2001		Consisted of Parts of Clay, Duval and St. Johns county; Resigned 6/30/2001
	Alfred "Al" Lawson, Jr.	Democratic	2002–2010	Midway, Florida	Consisted of Calhoun, Franklin, Gadsden, Gulf, Jackson, Liberty, Wakulla counties and parts of Bay, Jefferson, Leon, Madison counties; Minority (Democratic) Leader 2008–2010
	Bill Montford	Democratic	2010–2012	Marianna, Florida	Consisted of Calhoun, Franklin, Gadsden, Gulf, Jackson, Liberty, Wakulla counties and parts of Bay, Jefferson, Leon, Madison counties
	John E. Thrasher	Republican	2012–2014	Columbia, South Carolina	Consisted of Flagler, Putnam, St. Johns counties and part of Volusia county; Resigned 11/9/2014
	Audrey Gibson	Democratic	2014–2022	Jacksonville, Florida	Consisted of part of Duval county; Minority (Democratic) Leader 2018-2020
	Jennifer Bradley	Republican	2022–Present	Tokyo, Japan	Consists of Baker, Bradford, Clay, Columbia, Gilchrist, Union counties and part of Alachua county

== Elections ==
NOTE: The following results were gathered from the Florida Department of State. Uncontested election results are not provided.

=== 1978 ===
Democratic Primary (1978)
Party	Candidate	Votes	%
Democratic	K. H. "Buddy" MacKay	43,396	62.5%
Democratic	G. B. "Cap" Wilson	25,998	37.5%
Total votes		69,394	100%

=== 1980 ===
Democratic Primary (1980)
Party	Candidate	Votes	%
Democratic	Gene Keith	23,314	25.4%
Democratic	George Kirkpatrick	31,656	34.4%
Democratic	Perry C. McGriff, Jr.	36,962	40.2%
Total votes		91,932	100%

Democratic Primary Runoff (1980)
Party	Candidate	Votes	%
Democratic	George Kirkpatrick	44,777	52.7%
Democratic	Perry C. McGriff, Jr.	40,208	47.3%
Total votes		84,985	100%

=== 1982 ===
Democratic Primary (1982)
Party	Candidate	Votes	%
Democratic	Margaret C. Eppes	15,800	41.3%
Democratic	George Kirkpatrick	22,421	58.7%
Total votes		38,221	100%

=== 1986 ===
Democratic Primary (1982)
Party	Candidate	Votes	%
Democratic	George Kirkpatrick	25,529	55.4%
Democratic	Jo Ann Doke Smith	20,569	44.6%
Total votes		46,098	100%

=== 1990 ===
General Election (1990)
Party	Candidate	Votes	%
Republican	Ben Campe	27,694	33.9%
Democratic	George Kirkpatrick	53,952	66.1%
Total votes		81,646	100%

=== 1992 ===
General Election (1992)
Party	Candidate	Votes	%
Democratic	Sylvia Simmons	31,667	25.9%
Republican	Ander Crenshaw	90,498	74.1%
Total votes		122,165	100%

=== 1994 ===
Republican Primary (1994)
Party	Candidate	Votes	%
Republican	Jim Horne	14,867	60.3%
Republican	Ginny Myrick	9,793	39.7%
Total votes		24,660	100%

General Election (1994)
Party	Candidate	Votes	%
Democratic	Matthew F. (Matt) Carlucci	44,069	43.5%
Republican	Jim Horne	57,244	56.5%
Total votes		101,313	100%

=== 2010 ===
Democratic Primary (2010)
Party	Candidate	Votes	%
Democratic	Bill Montford	32,264	55.2%
Democratic	Curtis Richardson	26,236	44.8%
Total votes		58,500	100%

General Election (2010)
Party	Candidate	Votes	%
Republican	John Shaw	44,510	29.9%
Democratic	Bill Montford	99,825	67.0%
Unaffiliated	David H. Abrams	4,686	3.1%
Write-In	Harrison Arencibian	10	0.0%
Total votes		149,031	100%

=== 2012 ===
General Election (2012)
Party	Candidate	Votes	%
Republican	John Thrasher	139,941	58.7%
Democratic	Kathleen Trued	98,280	41.3%
Total votes		238,221	100%

=== 2014 ===
Republican Primary (2014)
Party	Candidate	Votes	%
Republican	Derek Hankerson	10,126	29.8%
Republican	John Thrasher	23,899	70.2%
Total votes		34,025	100%

General Election (2014)
Party	Candidate	Votes	%
Republican	John Thrasher	105,901	58.2%
Democratic	Kathleen Trued	66,786	36.7%
Unaffiliated	Greg Feldman	9,388	5.2
Total votes		182,075	100%
