= George Gainer =

American politician

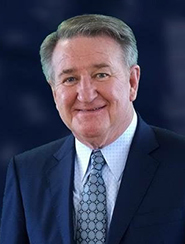

Member of the Florida Senate from the 2nd district
- In office November 8, 2016 – November 8, 2022
- Preceded by: Redistricted
- Succeeded by: Jay Trumbull

Bay County Commissioner
- In office 2002–2016
- In office 1968–1972

Personal details
- Born: August 26, 1942 (age 84) Jackson County, Florida, U.S.
- Party: Republican
- Spouse: Charla Janice Gainer
- Children: 6
- Education: Gulf Coast Community College
- Profession: Small business owner
- Website: http://www.georgegainer.com

George Gainer is an American politician who served as a Republican member of the Florida Senate from 2016 until 2022. He represented the 2nd district, encompassing Bay, Holmes, Jackson, Walton, Washington, and part of Okaloosa Counties, in the Florida Panhandle. He previously served as a Bay County commissioner, representing Tyndall AFB and other parts of southern Bay County, from 1968 to 1972 and 2002 to 2016.

== History ==
Gainer was born in Jackson County and attended Gulf Coast Community College. His career in the automobile business began in 1966 and he is currently owner of Bay Lincoln Mercury Dodge Hyundai, Bay Suzuki, and Bay Ford in Blountstown. He is a member of the Panama City New Car Dealers Association and past officer of the Chrysler and Ford Dealer and Advertising Councils. In 1968, at age 24, he became the youngest person elected to the Bay County Commission. Gainer then took time off to develop his businesses, and returned to the commission in 2002.

== Florida Senate ==
On September 8, 2015, Gainer announced his campaign for a Florida Senate district being vacated by Don Gaetz, who was term-limited. Gaetz's son Matt Gaetz was in the race for the seat too, but withdrew on March 21, 2016, to run for Florida's 1st congressional district after Congressman Jeff Miller announced his retirement. Gainer was elected in 2016 without primary or general election opposition.

On February 21, 2017, Senator Gainer filed SB1096, "Prohibiting a person from obstructing or interfering with traffic during a certain protest or demonstration; providing criminal penalties; exempting a motor vehicle operator from liability for injury or death to a person who is obstructing or interfering with traffic under certain circumstances".

Florida Senate
Preceded by Greg Evers	Member of the Florida Senate from the 2nd district 2016–2022	Succeeded by Jay Trumbull
