= 2024 Florida Senate election =

- November 5, 2024

20 of the 40 seats in the Florida Senate 21 seats needed for a majority
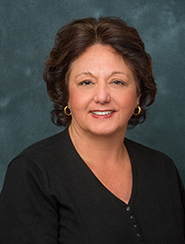

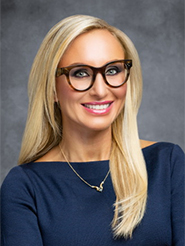
	Majority party	Minority party
Leader	Kathleen Passidomo	Lauren Book (term-limited)
Party	Republican	Democratic
Leader since	November 22, 2022	April 28, 2021
Leader's seat	28th - Naples	35th - Davie
Last election	28	12
Seats won	28	12
Seat change	Steady	Steady
Popular vote	2,877,697	1,842,050
Percentage	60.83%	38.94%
Swing	▲0.76	▲0.41
- Republican hold Democratic hold No election 50–60% 60–70% 70–80% 80–90% >90% 50–60% >90%
President before election
Kathleen Passidomo
Republican
Elected President
Ben Albritton
Republican

The 2024 elections for the Florida Senate took place on Tuesday, November 5, 2024, to elect state senators from 20 of 40 districts. The Republican Party has held a Senate majority since 1995.

== Term-limited incumbents ==
=== Republicans ===
- 1st district: Doug Broxson
- 7th district: Travis Hutson
- 9th district: Keith Perry
- 13th district: Dennis Baxley
- 19th district: Debbie Mayfield

=== Democrats ===
- 19th district: Linda Stewart
- 25th district: Vic Torres
- 35th district: Lauren Book

== Special elections ==
=== District 24 ===
On May 31, 2024, incumbent Democrat Bobby Powell submitted his resignation, effective November 4 of that same year, to run for Palm Beach County commissioner. Democratic county commissioner Mack Bernard was the only candidate to file, meaning the special election was cancelled and he was elected outright.

== Predictions ==
Source	Ranking	As of
Sabato's Crystal Ball	Safe R	June 18, 2024
CNalysis	Solid R	August 7, 2024

== Overview ==
Party	Candidates		Votes (Note: In 2 districts, the general election was canceled because one candidate was running unopposed. As a result, these vote totals do not represent how many voters supported each party in the general election.)	%	Seats			
Party	Opposed	Unopposed	Votes	%	Before	Won	After	+/−
Republican	17	0	2,877,697	60.83	28	28	28	-
Democratic	18	2	1,842,050	38.94	12	12	12	-
Independent	1	0	10,022	0.21	0	0	0	-
Write-in	1	0	703	0.01	0	0	0	-
Total	57	2	4,730,472	100.00	40	40	40	±0
Source: Florida Division of Elections

Popular vote
Republican	60.83%
Democratic	38.94%
Other	0.22%

Senate seats
Republican	70%
Democratic	30%

=== Closest races ===
Seats where the margin of victory was under 10%:

1. District 25, 2.96%

== Summary of results ==
Italics denote an open seat held by the incumbent party; bold text denotes a gain for a party.

- Only odd-numbered seats were up for election in 2024.

District	Incumbent	Party	Elected Senator	Outcome
1	Doug Broxson	Rep	Don Gaetz	Rep Hold
3	Corey Simon	Rep	Corey Simon	Rep Hold
5	Tracie Davis	Dem	Tracie Davis	Dem Hold
7	Travis Hutson	Rep	Tom Leek	Rep Hold
9	Keith Perry	Rep	Stan McClain	Rep Hold
11	Blaise Ingoglia	Rep	Blaise Ingoglia	Rep Hold
13	Dennis Baxley	Rep	Keith Truenow	Rep Hold
15	Geraldine Thompson	Dem	Geraldine Thompson	Dem Hold
17	Linda Stewart	Dem	Carlos Guillermo Smith	Dem Hold
19	Debbie Mayfield	Rep	Randy Fine	Rep Hold
21	Ed Hooper	Rep	Ed Hooper	Rep Hold
23	Danny Burgess	Rep	Danny Burgess	Rep Hold
25	Vic Torres	Dem	Kristen Arrington	Dem Hold
27	Ben Albritton	Rep	Ben Albritton	Rep Hold
29	Erin Grall	Rep	Erin Grall	Rep Hold
31	Gayle Harrell	Rep	Gayle Harrell	Rep Hold
33	Jonathan Martin	Rep	Jonathan Martin	Rep Hold
35	Lauren Book	Dem	Barbara Sharief	Dem Hold
37	Jason Pizzo	Dem	Jason Pizzo	Dem Hold
39	Bryan Avila	Rep	Bryan Avila	Rep Hold

== District 1 ==
2024 Florida's 1st Senate district election
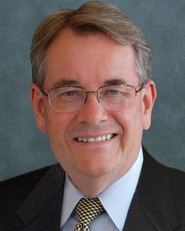

Nominee	Don Gaetz	Lisa Newell
Party	Republican	Democratic
Popular vote	187,431	102,905
Percentage	64.56	35.44
Senator before election
Doug Broxson
Republican
Elected Senator
Don Gaetz
Republican

The 1st district contains Escambia and Santa Rosa Counties, as well as a portion of northern Okaloosa County.

The incumbent was Republican Doug Broxson, who was re-elected with 71.2% of the vote in 2022. He was term-limited. Don Gaetz, who previously represented the district from 2006 to 2016, won the open seat.

=== Republican primary ===
==== Candidates ====
===== Nominee =====
- Don Gaetz, former state senator for this district and father of U.S. Representative Matt Gaetz

===== Withdrawn =====
- Frank White, former state representative (2016–2018) (endorsed Gaetz)

===== Declined =====
- Alex Andrade, state representative (endorsed White)

==== Endorsements ====
Don Gaetz

Statewide officials

- Jeff Atwater, former Chief Financial Officer of Florida (2011–2017)
- Wilton Simpson, Florida Commissioner of Agriculture

State legislators

- Ben Albritton, state senator
- Doug Broxson, incumbent state senator for the district
- Bill Galvano, former President of the Florida Senate (2018–2020)
- Andy Gardiner, former President of the Florida Senate (2014–2016)
- Mike Haridopolos, former President of the Florida Senate (2010–2012)
- Tom Lee, former President of the Florida Senate (2004–2006)
- Joe Negron, former President of the Florida Senate (2016–2018)
- Ken Pruitt, former President of the Florida Senate (2006–2008)
- Frank White, former state representative (2016–2018)
Frank White (withdrawn)

Statewide officials

- Jimmy Patronis, Chief Financial Officer of Florida

State legislators

- Alex Andrade, state representative
- ~~Doug Broxson, incumbent state senator for the district~~ (switched endorsement to Gaetz after White withdrew)
- Joel Rudman, state representative
- Michelle Salzman, state representative
- Jayer Williamson, former state representative (2016–2022)

==== Results ====
Republican primary results
Party	Candidate	Votes	%
Republican	Don Gaetz	Unopposed	
Total votes		N/A	100.00

=== Democratic nominee ===
- Lisa Newell, newspaper publisher

==== Results ====
Democratic primary results
Party	Candidate	Votes	%
Democratic	Lisa Newell	Unopposed	
Total votes		N/A	100.00

=== General election ===
==== Results ====
General election results
Party	Candidate	Votes	%
Republican	Don Gaetz	187,431	64.56
Democratic	Lisa Newell	102,905	35.44
Total votes		290,336	100.00
Republican hold			

== District 3 ==
2024 Florida's 3rd Senate district election
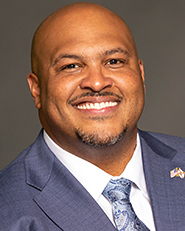

Candidate	Corey Simon	Daryl Parks
Party	Republican	Democratic
Popular vote	154,515	123,025
Percentage	55.67	44.33
Senator before election
Corey Simon
Republican
Elected Senator
Corey Simon
Republican

The 3rd district, Florida's largest state senate district by area, is located in the Big Bend and includes Dixie, Franklin, Gadsden, Gulf, Hamilton, Jefferson, Lafayette, Leon, Liberty, Suwannee, Taylor and Wakulla Counties. Tallahassee, Florida's state capital, is located within the district. The incumbent was Republican Corey Simon, who flipped the district and was elected with 53% of the vote in 2022.

=== Republican nominee ===
- Corey Simon, incumbent state senator

==== Results ====
Republican primary results
Party	Candidate	Votes	%
Republican	Corey Simon	Unopposed	
Total votes		N/A	100.00

=== Democratic primary ===
==== Candidates ====
===== Nominee =====
- Daryl Parks, civil rights lawyer

===== Eliminated in primary =====
- Kimblin NeSmith, Gadsden County commissioner

===== Withdrawn =====
- Sheria Griffin, Florida Education Association executive

==== Endorsements ====
Daryl Parks

State legislators

- Loranne Ausley, former state senator for this district (2020–2022)

Individuals

- Ben Crump, civil rights lawyer and Parks's former law partner

==== Results ====
Democratic primary results
Party	Candidate	Votes	%
Democratic	Daryl Parks	42,097	75.46%
Democratic	Kimblin NeSmith	13,690	24.54%
Total votes		55,787	100.00

=== General election ===
==== Debate ====
2024 Florida's 3rd Senate district debate
No.	Date	Host	Moderator	Link	Republican	Democratic
Key: P Participant A Absent N Not invited I Invited W Withdrawn						
Key: P Participant A Absent N Not invited I Invited W Withdrawn					Simon	Parks
1	Oct. 15, 2024	Capital Tiger Bay Club	Gary Fineout	WFSU	P	P

==== Predictions ====
Source	Ranking	As of
CNalysis	Tilt R	August 7, 2024

==== Endorsements ====
Corey Simon (R)

Organizations

- Americans for Prosperity Action

==== Results ====
General election results
Party	Candidate	Votes	%
Republican	Corey Simon (incumbent)	154,515	55.67
Democratic	Daryl Parks	123,025	44.33
Total votes		277,540	100.00
Republican hold			

== District 5 ==
2024 Florida's 5th Senate district election
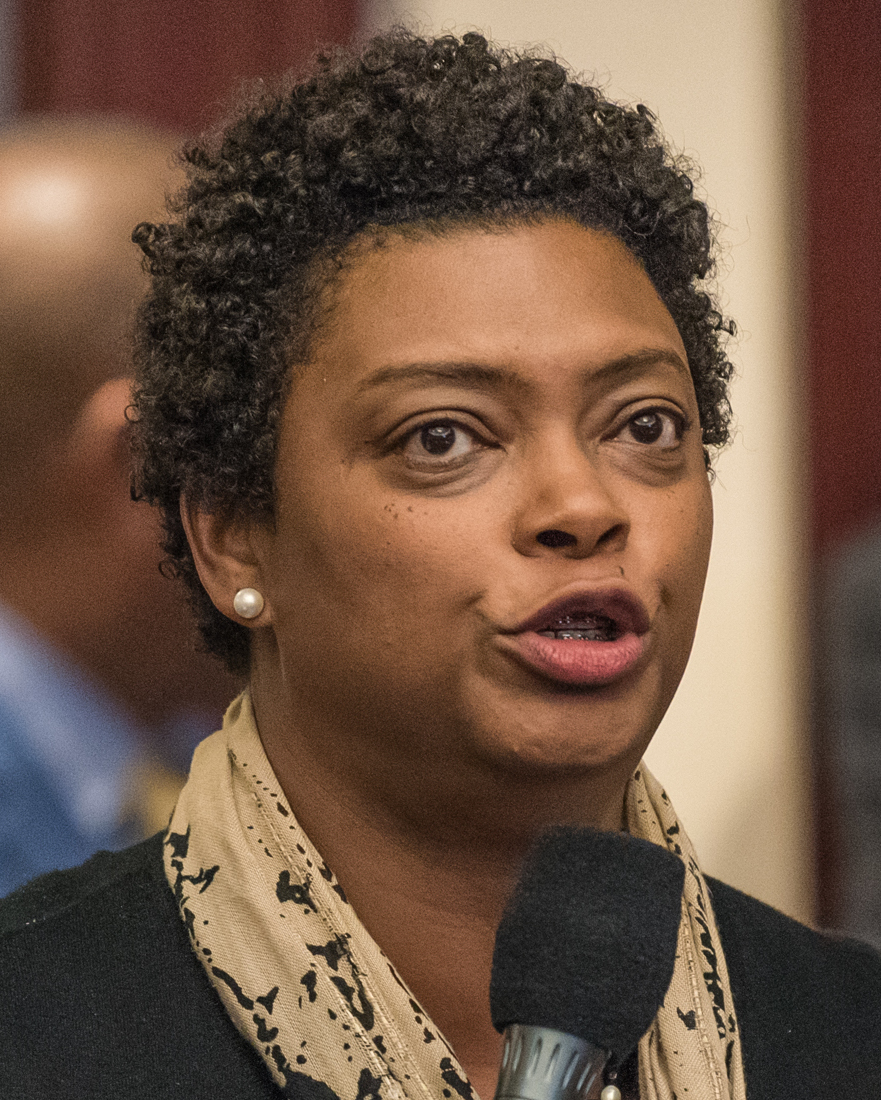

Nominee	Tracie Davis	Vernon Lee Jordan (write-in)
Party	Democratic	Independent
Popular vote	156,112	703
Percentage	99.55	0.45
Senator before election
Tracie Davis
Democratic
Elected Senator
Tracie Davis
Democratic

The 5th district encompasses central Duval County and the Jacksonville urban core. The incumbent was Democrat Tracie Davis, who was elected with 57.5% of the vote in 2022.

=== Democratic primary ===
==== Candidates ====
===== Nominee =====
- Tracie Davis, incumbent state senator

===== Eliminated in primary =====
- Francky Jeanty, educational consultant

==== Results ====
Democratic primary results
Party	Candidate	Votes	%
Democratic	Tracie Davis (incumbent)	31,999	95.16
Democratic	Francky Jeanty	1,628	4.84
Total votes		33,627	100.00

=== Independents ===
- Vernon Lee Jordan (write-in)

=== General election ===
==== Results ====
General election results
Party	Candidate	Votes	%
Democratic	Tracie Davis (incumbent)	156,112	99.55
Independent	Vernon Lee Jordan (write-in)	703	0.45
Total votes		156,815	100.00
Democratic hold			

== District 7 ==
2024 Florida's 7th Senate district election
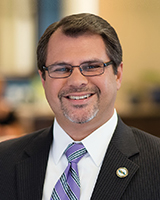

Candidate	Tom Leek	George Hill II
Party	Republican	Democratic
Popular vote	237,377	110,364
Percentage	68.26	31.74
Senator before election
Travis Hutson
Republican
Elected Senator
Tom Leek
Republican

The 7th district contains all of Flagler, St Johns and Putnam Counties, and the northernmost parts of Volusia County, including Pierson and most of Ormond Beach. The incumbent was Republican Travis Hutson, who was re-elected unopposed in 2022. Hutson was term-limited. State representative Tom Leek won the open seat.

=== Republican primary ===
==== Candidates ====
===== Nominee =====
- Tom Leek, state representative

===== Eliminated in primary =====
- Gerry James, financial advisor and candidate for this district in 2022
- David Shoar, former St. Johns County sheriff (2004–2020)

==== Endorsements ====
Gerry James

Statewide officials

- Sarah Palin, former Governor of Alaska
Tom Leek

Federal officials

- Cory Mills, U.S. representative from Florida's 7th congressional district
- Rick Scott, U.S. senator from Florida
- Michael Waltz, U.S. representative from Florida's 6th congressional district

Statewide officials

- Ron DeSantis, Governor of Florida
- Ashley Moody, Florida Attorney General
- Jeanette Nuñez, Lieutenant Governor of Florida
- Jimmy Patronis, Chief Financial Officer of Florida

State legislators

- Ben Albritton, state senator
- Jim Boyd, state senator
- Danny Burgess, state senator
- Alexis Calatayud, state senator
- Jay Collins, state senator
- Joe Gruters, state senator
- Travis Hutson, incumbent state senator for this district
- Paul Renner, Speaker of the Florida House of Representatives

Sheriffs

- Mike Chitwood, Volusia County sheriff
- H.D. "Gator" DeLoach, Putnam County sheriff
- Robert Hardwick, St. Johns County sheriff
- Rick Staly, Flagler County sheriff

Organizations

- Americans for Prosperity Action
- Volusia County Republican Party
David Shoar

Federal officials

- Donald Trump, former President of the United States (2017–2021) (previously declined to endorse)

U.S. representatives

- John Rutherford, U.S. representative from Florida's 5th congressional district (Note: Numbered as the 4th from 2017–2023)
Declined to endorse

Federal officials

- ~~Donald Trump, former President of the United States (2017–2021)~~

==== Polling ====
Poll source	Date(s) administered	Sample size (Note: Key: A – all adults RV – registered voters LV – likely voters V – unclear)	Margin of error	Gerry James	Tom Leek	David Shoar	Undecided
LcLaughlin & Associates (R)	June 27–30, 2024	300 (LV)	± 5.7%	9%	39%	20%	31%

==== Debate ====
2024 Florida's 7th Senate district republican primary debate
No.	Date	Host	Moderator	Link	Republican	Republican	Republican
Key: P Participant A Absent N Not invited I Invited W Withdrawn							
Key: P Participant A Absent N Not invited I Invited W Withdrawn					James	Leek	Shoar
1	Jul. 25, 2024	WESH	Greg Fox	YouTube	P	P	P

==== Results ====
Republican primary results
Party	Candidate	Votes	%
Republican	Tom Leek	35,938	47.30
Republican	David Shoar	20,917	27.53
Republican	Gerry James	19,116	25.16
Total votes		75,971	100.00

=== Democratic nominee ===
- George Hill II, construction company CEO

==== Results ====
Democratic primary results
Party	Candidate	Votes	%
Democratic	George Hill II	Unopposed	
Total votes		N/A	100.00

=== General election ===
==== Results ====
General election results
Party	Candidate	Votes	%
Republican	Tom Leek	237,377	68.26
Democratic	George Hill II	110,364	31.74
Total votes		347,741	100.00
Republican hold			

== District 9 ==
2024 Florida's 9th Senate district election
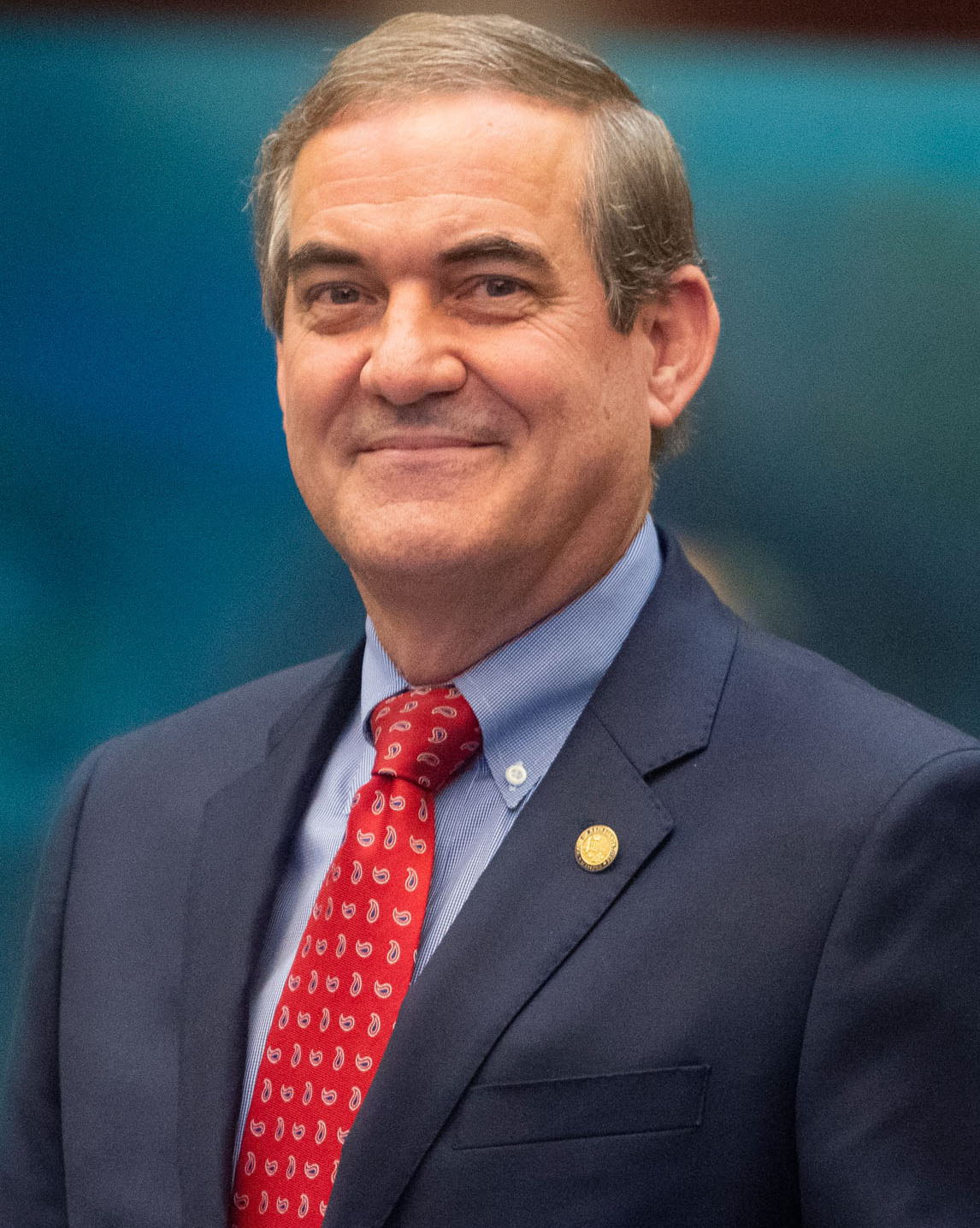

Candidate	Stan McClain	Sylvain Doré
Party	Republican	Democratic
Popular vote	177,937	103,275
Percentage	63.28	36.72
Senator before election
Keith Perry
Republican
Elected Senator
Stan McClain
Republican

The incumbent was Republican Keith Perry, who was re-elected with 65.5% of the vote in 2022. Perry was term-limited. State representative Stan McClain won the open seat.

=== Republican nominee ===
- Stan McClain, state representative

==== Endorsements ====
Stan McClain

State legislators

- Tom Leek, state representative

==== Results ====
Republican primary results
Party	Candidate	Votes	%
Republican	Stan McClain	Unopposed	
Total votes		N/A	100.00

=== Democratic nominee ===
- Sylvain Doré, retired professor

==== Results ====
Democratic primary results
Party	Candidate	Votes	%
Democratic	Sylvain Doré	Unopposed	
Total votes		N/A	100.00

=== General election ===
==== Endorsements ====
Sylvain Doré (D)

Organizations

- 314 Action
- Equality Florida Action PAC
- Planned Parenthood Action
Stan McClain (R)

State legislators

- Ben Albritton, state senator
- Tom Leek, state representative

Organizations

- Americans for Prosperity Action

==== Results ====
General election results
Party	Candidate	Votes	%
Republican	Stan McClain	177,937	63.28
Democratic	Sylvain Dore	103,275	36.72
Total votes		281,212	100.00
Republican hold			

== District 11 ==
2024 Florida's 11th Senate district election
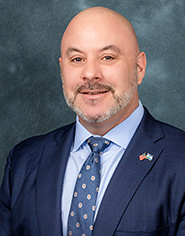

Candidate	Blaise Ingoglia	Marilyn Holleran
Party	Republican	Democratic
Popular vote	229,609	101,775
Percentage	69.29	30.71
Senator before election
Blaise Ingoglia
Republican
Elected Senator
Blaise Ingoglia
Republican

The incumbent was Republican Blaise Ingoglia, who was elected with 75.0% of the vote in 2022 against a Green Party opponent.

=== Republican nominee ===
- Blaise Ingoglia, incumbent state senator

==== Results ====
Republican primary results
Party	Candidate	Votes	%
Republican	Blaise Ingoglia	Unopposed	
Total votes		N/A	100.00

=== Democratic nominee ===
- Marilyn Holleran, former embassy worker

==== Results ====
Democratic primary results
Party	Candidate	Votes	%
Democratic	Marilyn Holleran	Unopposed	
Total votes		N/A	100.00

=== General election ===
==== Endorsements ====
Blaise Ingoglia (R)

State legislators

- Ben Albritton, state senator
- Jim Boyd, state senator
- Kathleen Passidomo, President of the Florida Senate
- Jay Trumbull, state senator

==== Results ====
General election results
Party	Candidate	Votes	%
Republican	Blaise Ingoglia	229,609	69.29
Democratic	Marilyn Holleran	101,775	30.71
Total votes		331,384	100.00
Republican hold			

== District 13 ==
2024 Florida's 13th Senate district election
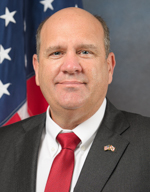

Candidate	Keith Truenow	Stephanie Dukes
Party	Republican	Democratic
Popular vote	181,074	119,212
Percentage	60.30	39.70
Senator before election
Dennis Baxley
Republican
Elected Senator
Keith Truenow
Republican

The incumbent was Republican Dennis Baxley, who was re-elected with 62.2% of the vote in 2022. Baxley was term-limited. State representative Keith Truenow won the open seat.

=== Republican primary ===
==== Candidates ====
===== Nominee =====
- Keith Truenow, state representative

===== Eliminated in primary =====
- Cheryl Blancett, retired investigator
- Bowen Kou, grocery store owner

===== Withdrawn =====
- Ebo Entsuah, Clermont city councilor (endorsed Truenow)

==== Endorsements ====
Keith Truenow

Statewide officials

- Ashley Moody, Florida Attorney General

State legislators

- Ben Albritton, state senator
- Dennis Baxley, incumbent state senator for this district
- Taylor Yarkosky, state representative

Local officials

- Peyton Grinnell, Lake County sheriff

==== Results ====
Republican primary results
Party	Candidate	Votes	%
Republican	Keith Truenow	29,729	67.03
Republican	Bowen Kou	10,607	23.91
Republican	Cheryl Blancett	4,018	9.06
Total votes		44,354	100.00

=== Democratic nominee ===
- Stephanie Dukes, retired teacher and nominee for this district in 2022

==== Results ====
Democratic primary results
Party	Candidate	Votes	%
Democratic	Stephanie Dukes	Unopposed	
Total votes		N/A	100.00

=== General election ===
==== Results ====
General election results
Party	Candidate	Votes	%
Republican	Keith Truenow	181,074	60.30
Democratic	Stephanie Dukes	119,212	39.70
Total votes		300,286	100.00
Republican hold			

== District 15 ==
2024 Florida's 15th Senate district election
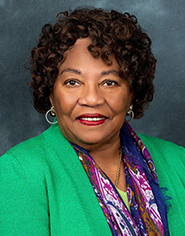
Nominee	Geraldine Thompson (Uncontested)
Party	Democratic
Senator before election
Geraldine Thompson
Democratic
Elected Senator
Geraldine Thompson
Democratic

The incumbent was Democrat Geraldine Thompson, who was elected unopposed in 2022. As no non-Democrat filed for the seat, the general election was cancelled, and Thompson won the seat outright after winning the Democratic primary.

=== Democratic primary ===
==== Candidates ====
===== Nominee =====
- Geraldine Thompson, incumbent state senator

===== Eliminated in primary =====
- Randolph Bracy, former state senator for this district (2016–2022)

==== Endorsements ====
Geraldine Thompson

U.S. representatives

- Maxwell Frost, U.S. representative from Florida's 10th congressional district

State legislators

- LaVon Bracy Davis, state representative

Newspapers

- Orlando Sentinel

==== Debate ====
2024 Florida's 15th Senate district democratic primary debate
No.	Date	Host	Moderator	Link	Democratic	Democratic
Key: P Participant A Absent N Not invited I Invited W Withdrawn						
Key: P Participant A Absent N Not invited I Invited W Withdrawn					Bracy	Thompson
1	Jul. 8, 2024	WESH	Greg Fox	WESH	P	P

==== Results ====
Democratic primary results
Party	Candidate	Votes	%
Democratic	Geraldine Thompson (incumbent)	23,997	60.76
Democratic	Randolph Bracy	15,498	39.24
Total votes		39,495	100.00

=== General election ===
==== Results ====
General election results
Party	Candidate	Votes	%
Democratic	Geraldine Thompson (incumbent)	Unopposed	
Total votes		N/A	100.0
Democratic hold			

== District 17 ==
2024 Florida's 17th Senate district election
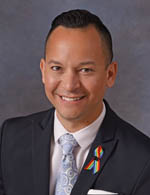
Nominee	Carlos Guillermo Smith (Uncontested)
Party	Democratic
Senator before election
Linda Stewart
Democratic
Elected Senator
Carlos Guillermo Smith
Democratic

The incumbent was Democrat Linda Stewart, who was re-elected with 56.1% of the vote in 2022. Stewart was term-limited. Former state representative Carlos Guillermo Smith was the only candidate to file for the seat, resulting in both the primary and general elections being cancelled, and Smith being elected outright.

=== Democratic nominee ===
- Carlos Guillermo Smith, former state representative

==== Endorsements ====
Carlos Guillermo Smith

U.S. representatives

- Maxwell Frost, U.S. representative for Florida's 10th congressional district

State legislators

- Lori Berman, state senator
- LaVon Bracy Davis, state representative
- Tracie Davis, state senator
- Anna Eskamani, state representative
- Rita Harris, state representative
- Shevrin Jones, state senator
- Johanna López, state representative
- Rosalind Osgood, state senator
- Tina Polsky, state senator
- Geraldine Thompson, state senator
- Vic Torres, state senator

Organizations

- Florida Democratic Party

Labor unions

- Central Florida AFL–CIO
- CWA Local 3108
- IATSE Local 631
- IBEW Local 606
- IUPAT District Council 78
- UNITE HERE Locals 362 & 737

==== Results ====
Democratic primary results
Party	Candidate	Votes	%
Democratic	Carlos Guillermo Smith	Unopposed	
Total votes		N/A	100.00

=== General election ===
==== Results ====
General election results
Party	Candidate	Votes	%
Democratic	Carlos Guillermo Smith	Unopposed	
Total votes		N/A	100.0
Democratic hold			

== District 19 ==
2024 Florida's 19th Senate district election
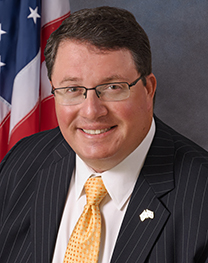

Candidate	Randy Fine	Vance Ahrens
Party	Republican	Democratic
Popular vote	184,731	126,487
Percentage	59.36	40.64
Senator before election
Debbie Mayfield
Republican
Elected Senator
Randy Fine
Republican

The incumbent was Republican Debbie Mayfield, who was re-elected unopposed in 2022. Mayfield was term-limited. State representative Randy Fine won the open seat.

=== Republican primary ===
==== Candidates ====
===== Nominee =====
- Randy Fine, state representative

===== Eliminated in primary =====
- Charles Sheridan, general contractor

===== Withdrawn =====
- Robyn Hattaway, lawyer
- Tim Thomas, Melbourne city councilor

===== Declined =====
- Tyler Sirois, state representative

==== Endorsements ====
Randy Fine

Federal officials

- Donald Trump, former President of the United States (2017–2021)

U.S. senators

- Rick Scott, U.S. senator from Florida

U.S. representatives

- Bill Posey, U.S. representative from Florida's 8th congressional district

Statewide officials

- Jimmy Patronis, Chief Financial Officer of Florida
- Wilton Simpson, Agriculture Commissioner of Florida

State legislators

- Ben Albritton, state senator
- Thad Altman, state representative
- Webster Barnaby, state representative
- Robbie Brackett, state representative
- Erin Grall, state senator
- Joe Gruters, state senator and former chair of the Republican Party of Florida
- Mike Haridopolos, former president of the Florida Senate
- Chase Tramont, state representative

Sheriffs

- Wayne Ivey, Brevard County sheriff

Labor unions

- International Union of Police Associations

==== Results ====
Republican primary results
Party	Candidate	Votes	%
Republican	Randy Fine	39,178	73.59
Republican	Charles Sheridan	14,062	26.41
Total votes		53,240	100.00

=== Democratic nominee ===
- Vance Ahrens, LGBTQ rights activist

==== Results ====
Democratic primary results
Party	Candidate	Votes	%
Democratic	Vance Ahrens	Unopposed	
Total votes		N/A	100.00

=== General election ===
==== Results ====
General election results
Party	Candidate	Votes	%
Republican	Randy Fine	184,731	59.36
Democratic	Vance Ahrens	126,487	40.64
Total votes		311,218	100.00
Republican hold			

== District 21 ==
2024 Florida's 21st district election
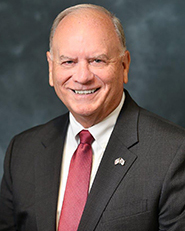

Candidate	Ed Hooper	Doris Carroll
Party	Republican	Democratic
Popular vote	175,862	109,078
Percentage	61.72	38.28
Senator before election
Ed Hooper
Republican
Elected Senator
Ed Hooper
Republican

The incumbent was Republican Ed Hooper, who was re-elected with 64.8% of the vote in 2022.

=== Republican primary ===
==== Candidates ====
===== Nominee =====
- Ed Hooper, incumbent state senator

===== Eliminated in primary =====
- John Siamas, U.S. Navy veteran and tax practitioner

==== Endorsements ====
Ed Hooper

State legislators

- Ben Albritton, state senator
- Jim Boyd, state senator
- Kathleen Passidomo, President of the Florida Senate
- Jay Trumbull, state senator

Newspapers

- Tampa Bay Times

==== Results ====
Republican primary results
Party	Candidate	Votes	%
Republican	Ed Hooper (incumbent)	34,391	85.09
Republican	John Siamas	6,027	14.91
Total votes		40,418	100.00

=== Democratic nominee ===
- Doris Carroll, nurse

==== Results ====
Democratic primary results
Party	Candidate	Votes	%
Democratic	Doris Carroll	Unopposed	
Total votes		N/A	100.00

=== General election ===
==== Results ====
General election results
Party	Candidate	Votes	%
Republican	Ed Hooper (incumbent)	175,862	61.72
Democratic	Doris Carroll	109,078	38.28
Total votes		284,940	100.00
Republican hold			

== District 23 ==
2024 Florida's 23rd Senate district election
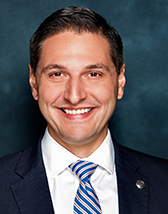

Candidate	Danny Burgess	Benjamin Braver
Party	Republican	Democratic
Popular vote	163,859	105,038
Percentage	58.75	37.66
Senator before election
Danny Burgess
Republican
Elected Senator
Danny Burgess
Republican

The incumbent was Republican Danny Burgess, who was re-elected with 63.2% of the vote in 2022.

=== Republican nominee ===
- Danny Burgess, incumbent state senator

==== Results ====
Republica primary results
Party	Candidate	Votes	%
Republican	Danny Burgess (incumbent)	Unopposed	
Total votes		N/A	100.00

=== Democratic nominee ===
- Benjamin Braver, middle school teacher

==== Results ====
Democratic primary results
Party	Candidate	Votes	%
Democratic	Benjamin Braver	Unopposed	
Total votes		N/A	100.00

=== Independent Party nominee ===
- John Houman, retired engineer and perennial candidate

==== Results ====
Independent primary results
Party	Candidate	Votes	%
Independent Party	John Houman	Unopposed	
Total votes		N/A	100.00

=== General election ===
==== Endorsements ====
Danny Burgess (R)

State legislators

- Ben Albritton, state senator
- Jim Boyd, state senator
- Kathleen Passidomo, President of the Florida Senate
- Jay Trumbull, state senator

Newspapers

- Tampa Bay Times

==== Results ====
General election results
Party	Candidate	Votes	%
Republican	Danny Burgess	163,859	58.75
Democratic	Benjamin Braver	105,038	37.65
Independent Party	John Houman	10,022	3.59
Total votes		278,919	100.00
Republican hold			

== District 25 ==
2024 Florida's 25th Senate district election
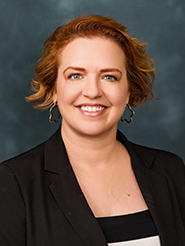

Candidate	Kristen Arrington	Jose Martinez
Party	Democratic	Republican
Popular vote	113,095	106,596
Percentage	51.48%	48.52%
Senator before election
Vic Torres
Democratic
Elected Senator
Kristen Arrington
Democratic

The incumbent was Democrat Vic Torres, who was re-elected with 52.6% of the vote in 2022. Torres was term-limited. State representative Kristen Arrington won the open seat.

=== Democratic primary ===
==== Candidates ====
===== Nominee =====
- Kristen Arrington, state representative

===== Eliminated in primary =====
- Alan Grayson, former U.S. representative from Florida's 9th congressional district (2009–2011, 2013–2017) and perennial candidate (Note: Candidate for the U.S. Senate in 2016 and 2022; candidate for Florida's 9th congressional district in 2018; write-in candidate for Florida's 6th congressional district in 2020; candidate for Florida's 10th congressional district in 2022)
- Carmen Torres, political organizer and wife of incumbent state senator Vic Torres

==== Endorsements ====
Kristen Arrington

Newspapers

- Orlando Sentinel
Carmen Torres

U.S. representatives

- Maxwell Frost, U.S. representative from Florida's 10th congressional district

==== Polling ====
Poll source	Date(s) administered	Sample size	Margin of error	Kristen Arrington	Alan Grayson	Carmen Torres	Other/Undecided
Impact Research (D)	July 29 – August 1, 2024	365 (LV)	–	38%	20%	15%	26%
Impact Research (D) (Note: Poll sponsored by Arrington's campaign)	May 9–13, 2024	400 (LV)	± 4.9%	30%	–	25%	45%

==== Debate ====
2024 Florida's 25th Senate district democratic primary debate
No.	Date	Host	Moderator	Link	Democratic	Democratic	Democratic
Key: P Participant A Absent N Not invited I Invited W Withdrawn							
Key: P Participant A Absent N Not invited I Invited W Withdrawn					Arrington	Grayson	Torres
1	Jul. 12, 2024	WESH	Greg Fox	YouTube	P	P	P

==== Results ====
Democratic primary results
Party	Candidate	Votes	%
Democratic	Kristen Arrington	11,162	50.53
Democratic	Carmen Torres	5,651	25.58
Democratic	Alan Grayson	5,279	23.90
Total votes		22,092	100.00

=== Republican primary ===
==== Candidates ====
===== Nominee =====
- Jose Martinez, T-Mobile franchise owner

===== Eliminated in primary =====
- Jon Arguello, Osceola County School Board member

==== Endorsements ====
Jose Martinez

Newspapers

- Orlando Sentinel

==== Debate ====
2024 Florida's 25th Senate district republican primary debate
No.	Date	Host	Moderator	Link	Republican	Republican
Key: P Participant A Absent N Not invited I Invited W Withdrawn						
Key: P Participant A Absent N Not invited I Invited W Withdrawn					Arguello	Martinez
1	Jul. 12, 2024	WESH	Greg Fox	YouTube	P	P

==== Results ====
Republican primary results
Party	Candidate	Votes	%
Republican	Jose Martinez	10,006	59.35
Republican	Jon Arguello	6,852	40.65
Total votes		16,858	100.00

=== General election ===
==== Debate ====
2024 Florida's 25th Senate district debate
No.	Date	Host	Moderator	Link	Democratic	Republican
Key: P Participant A Absent N Not invited I Invited W Withdrawn						
Key: P Participant A Absent N Not invited I Invited W Withdrawn					Arrington	Martinez
1	Sep. 5, 2024	WESH	Greg Fox	YouTube	P	P

==== Predictions ====
Source	Ranking	As of
CNalysis	Likely D	August 7, 2024

==== Polling ====
Poll source	Date(s) administered	Sample size	Margin of error	Kristen Arrington (D)	Jose Martinez (R)	Undecided
Impact Research (D)	–	–	± 4.9%	52%	37%	11%

==== Results ====
General election results
Party	Candidate	Votes	%
Democratic	Kristen Arrington	113,095	51.48
Republican	Jose Martinez	106,596	48.52
Total votes		219,691	100.00
Democratic hold			

== District 27 ==
2024 Florida's 27th Senate district election
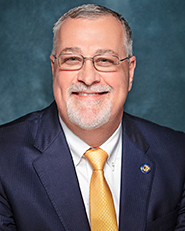

Candidate	Ben Albritton	Phillip Carter
Party	Republican	Democratic
Popular vote	189,809	86,045
Percentage	68.81	31.19
Senator before election
Ben Albritton
Republican
Elected Senator
Ben Albritton
Republican

The incumbent was Republican Ben Albritton, who was re-elected with 71.2% of the vote in 2022.

=== Republican nominee ===
- Ben Albritton, incumbent state senator and Senate Majority Leader

==== Results ====
Republican primary results
Party	Candidate	Votes	%
Republican	Ben Albritton (incumbent)	Unopposed	
Total votes		N/A	100.00

=== Democratic nominee ===
- Phillip Carter, former construction worker

==== Results ====
Democratic primary results
Party	Candidate	Votes	%
Democratic	Phillip Carter	Unopposed	
Total votes		N/A	100.00

=== General election ===
==== Results ====
General election results
Party	Candidate	Votes	%
Republican	Ben Albritton (incumbent)	189,809	68.81
Democratic	Phillip Carter	86,045	31.19
Total votes		275,854	100.00
Republican hold			

== District 29 ==
2024 Florida's 29th Senate district election
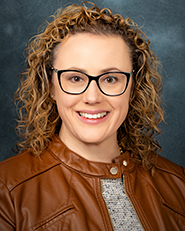

Nominee	Erin Grall	Randy Aldieri
Party	Republican	Democratic
Popular vote	177,633	97,094
Percentage	64.66	35.34
Senator before election
Erin Grall
Republican
Elected Senator
Erin Grall
Republican

The incumbent was Republican Erin Grall, who was elected unopposed in 2022.

=== Republican nominee ===
- Erin Grall, incumbent state senator

==== Results ====
Republican primary results
Party	Candidate	Votes	%
Republican	Erin Grall (incumbent)	Unopposed	
Total votes		N/A	100.00

=== Democratic nominee ===
- Randy Aldieri, business consultant

==== Results ====
Democratic primary results
Party	Candidate	Votes	%
Democratic	Randy Aldieri	Unopposed	
Total votes		N/A	100.00

=== General election ===
==== Endorsements ====
Erin Grall

State legislators

- Ben Albritton, state senator
- Jim Boyd, state senator
- Kathleen Passidomo, President of the Florida Senate
- Jay Trumbull, state senator

==== Results ====
General election results
Party	Candidate	Votes	%
Republican	Erin Grall (incumbent)	177,633	64.66
Democratic	Randy Aldieri	97,094	35.34
Total votes		274,727	100.00
Republican hold			

== District 31 ==
2024 Florida's 31st Senate district election
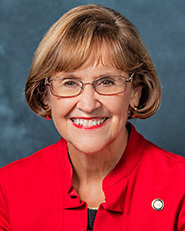

Candidate	Gayle Harrell	Aaron Hawkins
Party	Republican	Democratic
Popular vote	199,888	125,280
Percentage	61.47	38.53
Senator before election
Gayle Harrell
Republican
Elected Senator
Gayle Harrell
Republican

The incumbent was Republican Gayle Harrell, who was re-elected unopposed in 2022.

=== Republican primary ===
==== Candidates ====
===== Nominee =====
- Gayle Harrell, incumbent state senator

===== Did not qualify =====
- Joseph Bauer, medical research professional

==== Endorsements ====
Gayle Harrell

Statewide officials

- Ron DeSantis, Governor of Florida

State legislators

- Ben Albritton, state senator
- Jim Boyd, state senator
- Kathleen Passidomo, President of the Florida Senate
- Jay Trumbull, state senator

==== Results ====
Republican primary results
Party	Candidate	Votes	%
Republican	Gayle Harrell (incumbent)	Unopposed	
Total votes		N/A	100.00

=== Democratic nominee ===
- Aaron Hawkins, data professional and Stuart Community Redevelopment Board member

==== Results ====
Democratic primary results
Party	Candidate	Votes	%
Democratic	Aaron Hawkins	Unopposed	
Total votes		N/A	100.00

=== General election ===
==== Results ====
General election results
Party	Candidate	Votes	%
Republican	Gayle Harrell (incumbent)	199,888	61.47
Democratic	Aaron Hawkins	125,280	38.53
Total votes		325,168	100.00
Republican hold			

== District 33 ==
2024 Florida's 33rd Senate district election
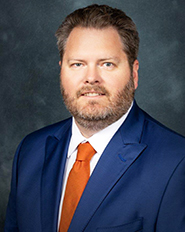

Candidate	Jonathan Martin	Christopher Proia
Party	Republican	Democratic
Popular vote	175,411	90,247
Percentage	66.03	33.97
Senator before election
Jonathan Martin
Republican
Elected Senator
Jonathan Martin
Republican

The incumbent was Republican Jonathan Martin, who was elected with 98.9% of the vote in 2022 against a write-in opponent.

=== Republican nominee ===
- Jonathan Martin, incumbent state senator

==== Results ====
Republican primary results
Party	Candidate	Votes	%
Republican	Jonathan Martin (incumbent)	Unopposed	
Total votes		N/A	100.00

=== Democratic nominee ===
- Christopher Proia, trucker and nominee for the 27th district in 2022

==== Results ====
Democratic primary results
Party	Candidate	Votes	%
Democratic	Christopher Proia	Unopposed	
Total votes		N/A	100.00

=== General election ===
==== Endorsements ====
Jonathan Martin (R)

State legislators

- Ben Albritton, state senator
- Jim Boyd, state senator
- Kathleen Passidomo, President of the Florida Senate
- Jay Trumbull, state senator

==== Results ====
General election results
Party	Candidate	Votes	%
Republican	Jonathan Martin (incumbent)	175,411	66.03
Democratic	Christopher Proia	90,247	33.97
Total votes		265,658	100.00
Republican hold			

== District 35 ==
2024 Florida's 35th Senate district election
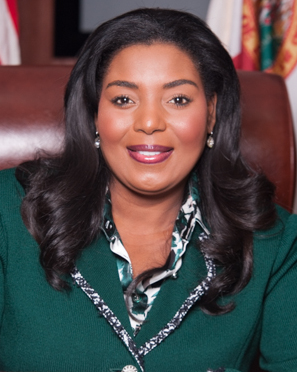

Candidate	Barbara Sharief	Vinny Parlatore
Party	Democratic	Republican
Popular vote	140,564	108,777
Percentage	56.37	43.63
Senator before election
Lauren Book
Democratic
Elected Senator
Barbara Sharief
Democratic

The incumbent was Democrat Lauren Book, who was re-elected unopposed in 2022. Book was term-limited. Former mayor of Broward County Barbara Sharief, who had unsuccessfully challenged Book in 2022, won the open seat.

=== Democratic primary ===
==== Candidates ====
===== Nominee =====
- Barbara Sharief, former mayor of Broward County (2013–2014, 2016–2017), candidate for this district in 2022, and candidate for Florida's 20th congressional district in the 2022 special election

===== Eliminated in primary =====
- Rodney Jacobs Jr., director of the Miami Civilian Investigative Panel
- Chad Klitzman, lawyer

==== Endorsements ====
Chad Klitzman

State legislators

- Lori Berman, state senator
- Mike Gottlieb, state representative
- Fred Lippman, former state representative (1978–1999)
- Robert McKnight, former state senator (1978–1982)
- Tina Polsky, state senator
- Eleanor Sobel, former state senator (2008–2016)
- Richard Stark, former state representative (2014–2020)

Organizations

- LGBTQ Victory Fund

Newspapers

- Sun Sentinel

==== Results ====
Democratic primary results
Party	Candidate	Votes	%
Democratic	Barbara Sharief	15,161	46.56
Democratic	Chad Klitzman	11,359	34.88
Democratic	Rodney Jacobs Jr.	6,045	18.56
Total votes		32,565	100.00

=== Republican nominee ===
- Vinny Parlatore, former Broward County sheriff's deputy

==== Results ====
Republican primary results
Party	Candidate	Votes	%
Republican	Vinny Parlatore	Unopposed	
Total votes		N/A	100.00

=== General election ===
==== Results ====
General election results
Party	Candidate	Votes	%
Democratic	Barbara Sharief	140,564	56.33
Republican	Vinny Parlatore	108,777	43.63
Total votes		249,341	100.00
Democratic hold			

== District 37 ==
2024 Florida's 37th Senate district election
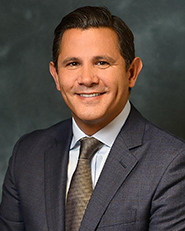

Candidate	Jason Pizzo	Imtiaz Mohammad
Party	Democratic	Republican
Popular vote	130,931	93,918
Percentage	58.23	41.77
Senator before election
Jason Pizzo
Democratic
Elected Senator
Jason Pizzo
Democratic

The incumbent was Democrat Jason Pizzo, who was re-elected unopposed in 2022.

=== Democratic nominee ===
- Jason Pizzo, incumbent state senator

==== Results ====
Democratic primary results
Party	Candidate	Votes	%
Democratic	Jason Pizzo (incumbent)	Unopposed	
Total votes		N/A	100.00

=== Republican nominee ===
- Imtiaz Mohammad

==== Results ====
Republican primary results
Party	Candidate	Votes	%
Republican	Imtiaz Mohammad	Unopposed	
Total votes		N/A	100.00

=== General election ===
==== Results ====
General election results
Party	Candidate	Votes	%
Democratic	Jason Pizzo (incumbent)	130,931	58.23
Republican	Imtiaz Mohammad	93,918	41.77
Total votes		224,849	100.00
Democratic hold			

== District 39 ==
2024 Florida's 39th Senate district election
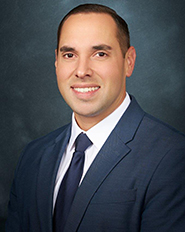

Candidate	Bryan Avila	Charles Lewis
Party	Republican	Democratic
Popular vote	133,270	57,635
Percentage	69.81	30.19
Senator before election
Bryan Avila
Republican
Elected Senator
Bryan Avila
Republican

The incumbent was Republican Bryan Avila, who was elected unopposed in 2022.

=== Republican nominee ===
- Bryan Avila, incumbent state senator

==== Results ====
Republican primary results
Party	Candidate	Votes	%
Republican	Bryan Avila (incumbent)	Unopposed	
Total votes		N/A	100.00

=== Democratic nominee ===
- Charles Lewis

==== Results ====
Democratic primary results
Party	Candidate	Votes	%
Democratic	Charles Lewis	Unopposed	
Total votes		N/A	100.00

=== General election ===
==== Endorsements ====
Bryan Avila (R)

State legislators

- Ben Albritton, state senator
- Jim Boyd, state senator
- Kathleen Passidomo, President of the Florida Senate
- Jay Trumbull, state senator

Organizations

- Americans for Prosperity Action
- Florida Fraternal Order of Police

==== Results ====
General election results
Party	Candidate	Votes	%
Republican	Bryan Avila (incumbent)	133,270	69.81
Democratic	Charles Lewis	57,635	30.19
Total votes		190,905	100.00
Republican hold			

== See also ==
- 2024 Florida elections
  - 2024 Florida House of Representatives election
- List of Florida state legislatures
- Politics of Florida
  - Political party strength in Florida
  - Florida Democratic Party
  - Republican Party of Florida
- Government of Florida

== Notes ==
Partisan clients
