= Richard Gentry =

Richard Gentry may refer to:

- Richard Gentry (Missouri politician) (1788-1837), member of the state Senate
- Richard Gentry (Florida politician) (born 1951), member of the state House of Representatives
