= Seth French House =

Historic house in Florida, United States

- U.S. National Register of Historic Places
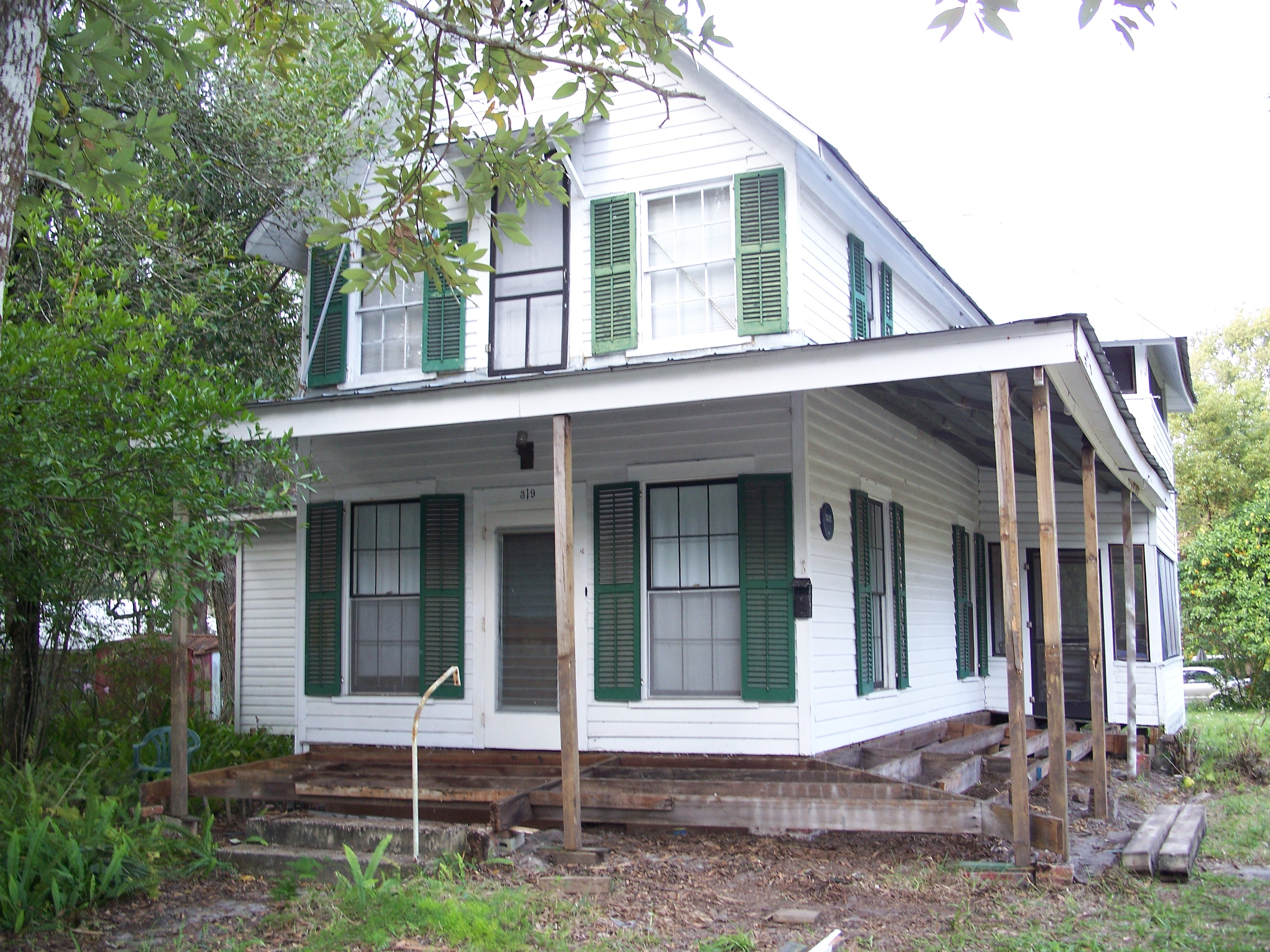

- Location within Volusia County
- Location: Orange City, Florida United States
- Coordinates: 28°57′9″N 81°17′47″W
- Built: 1876
- Architectural style: Frame Vernacular
- NRHP reference No.: 03000005
- Added to NRHP: February 12, 2003

The Seth French House (also known as the Fairview Cottage) is a historic house located at 319 East French Avenue in Orange City, Florida. It is locally significant as one of the oldest dwellings in the county, and also as a good example of Frame Vernacular construction from the late 19th and early 20th centuries. The house was built for American Civil War veteran and surgeon Seth French in 1876. He served in the Florida Senate in 1879.

== Description and history ==
The house, as built originally, consisted of the rectangular main block. On the first floor it included the wraparound veranda on the main (south) and east elevations, parlor, living room, dining room, kitchen, storage area, and small wrap-around porch on the northwest corner. On the second floor it included the three bedrooms, stair hall, and vestibule.

The house was built in 1876 by Seth French, a surgeon and Civil War veteran and later a member of the Florida Senate and the state's Commissioner of Immigration. The house was altered 3 times – in 1905, 1915 and 1925 – and is now owned by French's great-granddaughter.

On February 12, 2003, it was added to the U.S. National Register of Historic Places.

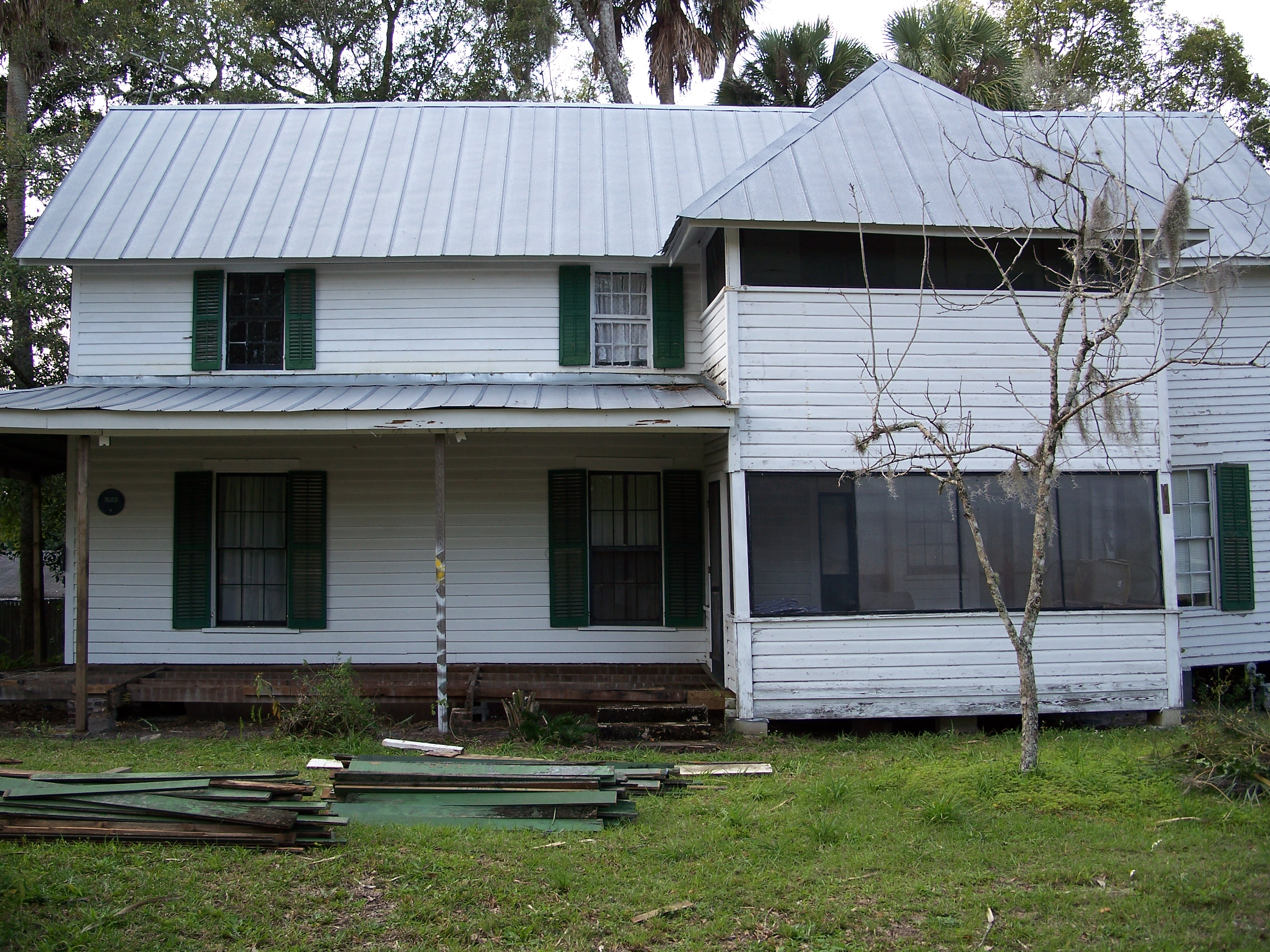
