= Florida's 9th Senate district =

Florida's 9th State Senate district
- Interactive map of district boundary since January 3, 2023
Senator
Stan McClain; R–Summerfield

Florida's 9th Senate district elects one member to the Florida State Senate. It covers Marion County, Florida and parts of Alachua County and Levy County.

Until 2022, the district was based on Sanford, Florida. Now it is based on Ocala, Florida.

== Members ==
Portrait	Name	Party	Years of service	Home city	Notes
	Audrey Gibson	Democratic	2012–2016		
	David Simmons	Republican	2016–2020		
	Jason Brodeur	Republican	2020–2022		
	Keith Perry	Republican	2022–2024		
	Stan McClain	Republican	2024–present	Summerfield	
