= Randy Maggard =

American politician (born 1963)

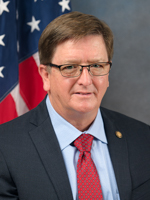

Member of the Florida House of Representatives
- Incumbent
- Assumed office June 18, 2019
- Preceded by: Danny Burgess
- Constituency: 38th district (2019–2022); 54th district (2022–present)

Personal details
- Born: July 4, 1963 (age 63) Dade City, Florida, U.S.
- Party: Republican
- Spouse: Colleen
- Children: Three
- Education: Pasco-Hernando State College (AA)

Randy Maggard (born July 4, 1963) is an American politician. He is a Republican representing the 54th district in the Florida House of Representatives.

== Early life ==
Maggard was born in Dade City, Florida. He earned an Associate degree from Pasco-Hernando State College in 1983.

== Personal life ==
He and his wife, Colleen, have three children and live in Dade City.

== Political career ==
Maggard was chairman of the Republican Party of Pasco from 2006 to 2012.

In 2019, Maggard ran in a special election to fill the 38th district's seat in the Florida House of Representatives, after former Rep. Danny Burgess was appointed head of the Florida Department of Veterans' Affairs. Maggard defeated David McCallister in the Republican primary with 61.9% of the primary, and won the general election against Democrat Kelly Smith with 55.6% of the vote.

In 2026 Maggard proposed a bill to ban local governments in Florida from regulating clean water and pollution.

Maggard sits on the following committees:

- Business & Professions Subcommittee
- Health Quality Subcommittee
- Higher Education Appropriations Subcommittee
- Joint Select Committee on Collective Bargaining
- Local Administration Subcommittee

== Electoral record ==
2018 Republican primary election: Florida House of Representatives, District 38
Party	Candidate	Votes	%
Republican	Randy Maggard	4,521	61.9%
Republican	David McCallister	2,784	38.1%

2018 general election: Florida House of Representatives, District 38
Party	Candidate	Votes	%
Republican	Randy Maggard	9,617	55.6%
Democratic	Kelly Smith	7,685	44.4%
