= Florida's 27th House of Representatives district =

American legislative district

Florida's 27th State House of Representatives district
Representative
Richard Gentry; R–Astor

Florida's 27th House of Representatives district elects one member of the Florida House of Representatives. It covers parts of Lake County, Marion County and Volusia County.

== Members ==
- Stan McClain (2022–2024)
- Richard Gentry (since 2024)
