= Gary Farmer (Florida politician) =

American politician

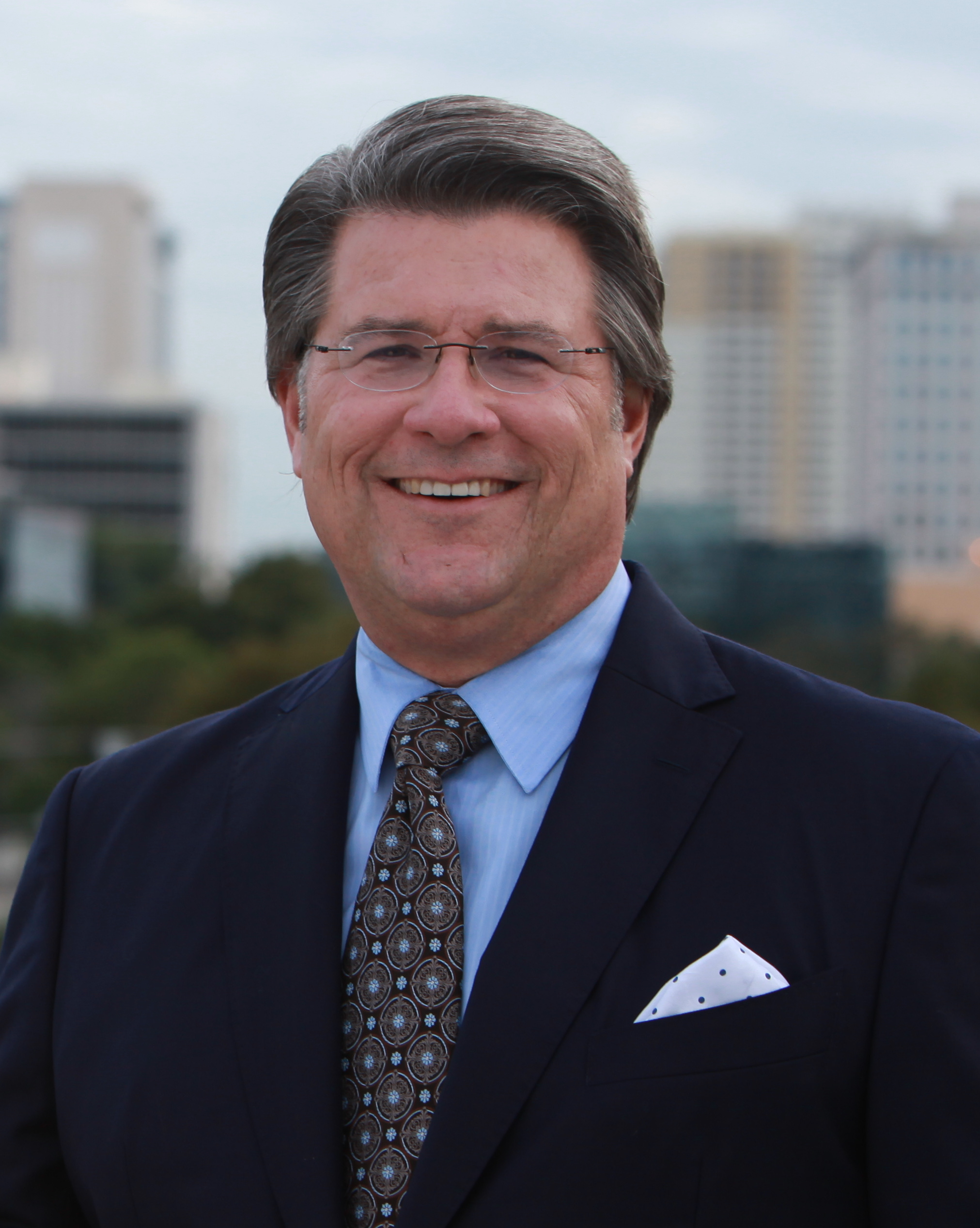

Minority Leader of the Florida Senate
- In office November 16, 2020 – April 28, 2021
- Preceded by: Audrey Gibson
- Succeeded by: Lauren Book

Member of the Florida Senate from the 34th district
- In office November 8, 2016 – November 8, 2022
- Preceded by: Redistricted
- Succeeded by: Shevrin Jones

Personal details
- Born: Gary Michael Farmer Jr. April 29, 1964 (age 62) Ft. Lauderdale, Florida, U.S.
- Party: Democratic
- Spouse: Stacey Rogers
- Children: 2
- Education: Florida State University (BS); University of Toledo (JD)

Gary Michael Farmer Jr. (born April 29, 1964) is an American attorney and former Democratic politician from Florida. He served as a member of the Florida Senate from 2016 until 2022, representing parts of eastern Broward County. He was the Senate's minority leader from 2020 to 2021.

== Life and career ==
Farmer was born in Fort Lauderdale, Florida. He attended Florida State University, where he graduated with a bachelor's degree in history in 1986. Afterwards, he attended the University of Toledo College of Law in Ohio, graduating in 1991. He returned to Florida to practice law, and founded the law firm Farmer, Jaffe, Weissing, Edwards, Fistos and Lehrman, specializing in consumer protection litigation.

He was the president of the Florida Justice Association, a trade group of trial lawyers, from 2012 to 2013.

== Florida Senate ==
=== Electoral history ===
When court-ordered redistricting resulted in an open Florida Senate seat based in eastern Broward County in 2016, Farmer decided to run for the seat. He faced former state Representative Jim Waldman and state Representative Gwyndolen Clarke-Reed in the Democratic primary. Farmer won with 43% of the vote to Waldman's 28% and Clarke-Reed's 29%. It was the most expensive Florida Senate primary that year, with Farmer raising hundreds of thousands of dollars primarily from law firms and trial attorneys, and Waldman getting financial support from insurance companies, gambling interests, and other industry groups.

Farmer won the 2016 general election with 63% of the vote against Republican Antoanet Iotova. Iotova was arrested the month before the election and charged with two counts of grand theft.

Farmer won reelection in the 2018 elections, defeating Waldman again in the Democratic primary.

Farmer did not file to run for re-election in 2022 and left office on November 8, succeeded by fellow Democrat Shevrin Jones.

=== Committees ===
In the Senate, Farmer serves on the Banking and Insurance Committee, the Education Committee, the Environmental Preservation and Conservation Committee, and the Appropriations Subcommittees on PreK-12 Education and Higher Education.

=== Minority leader ===
On November 16, 2020, the Democratic Senate caucus elected Farmer minority leader for the 2020–22 Legislature. On April 28, 2021, two days before the end of the 2021 legislative session, the Democratic caucus removed Farmer in a vote of no confidence.

Florida Senate
Preceded by Maria Sachs	Member of the Florida Senate from the 34th district 2016–2022	Succeeded by Shevrin Jones
Preceded by Audrey Gibson	Minority Leader of the Florida Senate; 2020–2021	Succeeded by Lauren Book
