= Peter Weinstein =

American politician

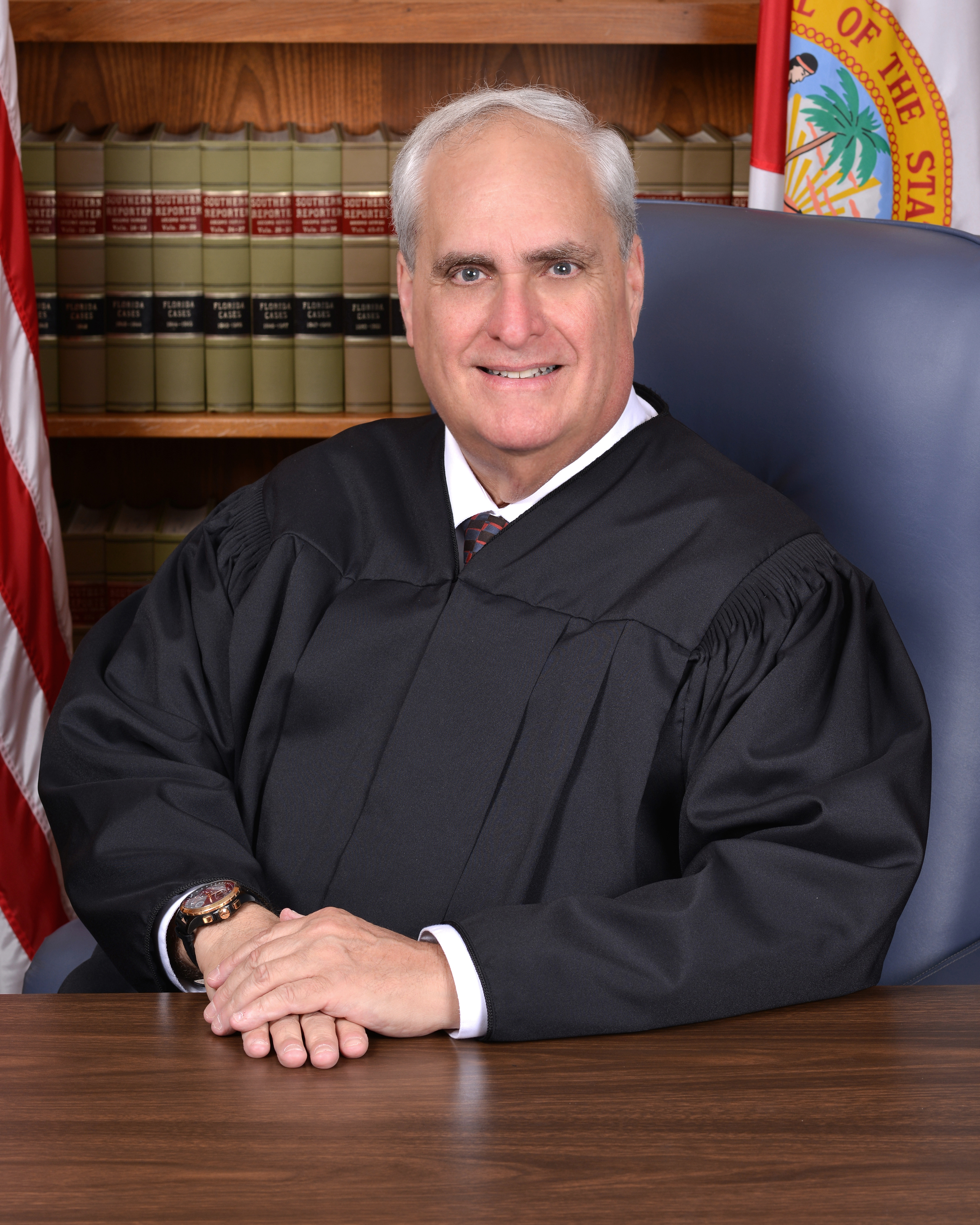

Majority Leader of the Florida Senate
- In office May 9, 1990 – 1992

Member of the Florida Senate from the 29th district
- In office 1983–1996

Personal details
- Born: February 3, 1947 (age 79) New York City, New York, U.S.
- Party: Democratic
- Spouse: Barbara Weinstein
- Relations: 3 (grandchildren)
- Children: Andrew Weinstein, Michael Weinstein
- Parent: Moses M. Weinstein (father)
- Occupation: attorney, judge

Peter M. Weinstein (born February 3, 1947) is an American politician in the state of Florida for the Democratic Party, who served as state senator from the 29th district from 1983 to 1996, and as the Florida Senate Majority Leader from May 9, 1990 to 1992.

== Life ==
Peter M. Weinstein was born and raised in New York City. He is a graduate of New York University and Brooklyn Law School. He worked as clerk to a New York State Supreme Court Justice and as an Assistant District Attorney. He left as Chief of the Supreme Court Trial Bureau in Queens, New York to accept a position in the Broward State Attorney's Office in 1977.

Upon leaving the State Attorney's Office, he entered private practice in the areas of civil and criminal litigation.

In 1982 he was elected to the State Senate from a district encompassing much of western and northern Broward County. In his 14 years as a State Senator, he served as Chairman of the Senate Judiciary Criminal Committee and later served terms as vice chairman and chairman of the Judiciary Committee. He also served a term as Majority Leader of the Florida Senate. He was actively involved in writing several pieces of consumer legislation including the areas of automobile leasing, telephone sales solicitations, health clubs, travel agent regulation and viatical settlements. In addition, he has served on numerous State Boards including the Article V Study Commission which was responsible for studying many aspects of the judicial system.

Weinstein served in the United States Army and was honorably discharged with the rank of captain. He tried almost 200 court martial cases. He was awarded the Army Commendation Medal by the Secretary of the Army.

In 1997 Florida Governor Lawton Chiles appointed him to the Circuit Court for a new judgeship which took effect in January 1998. He was subsequently elected without opposition to a new term in 2000 and 2006 and 2012. He spent over ten years sitting in the criminal division of Circuit Court. In 2008, he was assigned to the Civil Division. Elected to chief judge of the Seventeenth Judicial Circuit in February, 2011 by his colleagues and subsequently re-elected in 2013 and 2015. As chief judge, Weinstein was responsible for the overall management of the 17th Judicial Circuit. The circuit is the second largest in the state and is composed of 90 judges plus 11 general magistrates and hearing officers.

Created the Broward Veterans Court. This a court designed to assist those veterans who have been charged with a criminal offense, to obtain therapeutic treatment services. Upon completion of his third and final term as chief judge, he was assigned to the Probate and Guardianship Division.

Weinstein and his wife have two sons who both practice law in this area and three grandchildren.
