= 2024 Florida Amendment 2 =

Referendum protecting the right to hunt and fish

- November 5, 2024
- RIGHT TO FISH AND HUNT

Results
Choice	Votes	%
Yes	6,941,307	67.34%
No	3,365,987	32.66%
County results
Yes
50–60%
60–70%
70–80%
80–90%

2024 Florida Amendment 2 was a proposed amendment to the Constitution of Florida to establish a constitutional right to hunt and fish, including by the usage of traditional methods. The ballot measure passed, receiving over 67% of the vote, and the backing of all 67 Florida counties.

== Background ==
House Joint Resolution 1157 (HJR 1157) placed the measure on the ballot. On April 25, 2023, it passed the State House in a 116 to 0 vote, with 3 not voting, and on April 28, it was agreed to by the State Senate in a 38 to 1 vote, with 1 not voting. The sole opposition vote came from former State Sen. Lauren Book. The resolution was introduced by State Rep. Lauren Melo.

== Contents ==
On the ballot, the title for the amendment was: "RIGHT TO FISH AND HUNT."

The summary provided to voters was: "Proposing an amendment to the State Constitution to preserve forever fishing and hunting, including by the use of traditional methods, as a public right and preferred means of responsibly managing and controlling fish and wildlife. Specifies that the amendment does not limit the authority granted to the Fish and Wildlife Conservation Commission under Section 9 of Article IV of the State Constitution."

The amendment added Section 28 to Article 1 of the state's constitution, which states: "SECTION 28. Fishing, hunting, and the taking of fish and wildlife.—Fishing, hunting, and the taking of fish and wildlife, including by the use of traditional methods, shall be preserved forever as a public right and preferred means of responsibly managing and controlling fish and wildlife. This section does not limit the authority granted to the Fish and Wildlife Conservation Commission under Section 9 of Article IV."

== Viewpoints ==
=== Support ===
==== Legislators ====
State House Speaker Paul Renner praised State Rep. Lauren Melo for introducing HJR 1157, saying that the filing of the resolution was "in hopes of permanently preserving Floridians’ right to fish and hunt." Renner went on to say, "For generations, Floridians have used fishing and hunting as a means to provide for themselves and their families."

State Sen. Jim Boyd backed the amendment, saying that it was, "really hard to believe that there are states that are outlawing fishing and hunting" and that "Florida will not be one of those states."

State Sen. Bobby Powell was unsure of the amendment's purpose, as he had not seen any push for such changes within Florida. "I haven't seen it happening anywhere in the state of Florida. I don't know where it's happening nationally. I'm going to be in support of this legislation today based on the fact that I don't see it happening here." In response, State Sen. Jason Brodeur brought up an unsuccessful ballot initiative in Oregon that had sought to ban hunting and fishing. It fell 20,000 signatures short of the required 112,000 needed to get on the ballot.

State Sen. Jason Brodeur supported the measure, explaining that, "Hunting and fishing's been a way of life not only for all of human civilization, but Florida in particular" and that the amendment "would allow voters the opportunity to memorialize that in our constitution."

State Rep. Lauren Melo, who was the introducer of the legislation which placed the measure on the ballot, said, after it passed the State House, "HJR 1157 is about the heritage of Florida." Melo believed that many people did not "realize the economic value fishing and hunting provides our great state," and that, "Passing this legislation is a powerful statement that we support and champion our fishing and hunting traditions, and we want to protect (them) for our future."

=== Opposition ===
==== Editorials ====
The Orlando Sentinel opposed the amendment, saying that the amendment addressed "an imaginary problem" and that it "could create consequences that are unimaginable."

The Miami Herald believed the amendment was "misleading" because of there being "no credible proposals to stop Floridians from hunting or fishing," and if there were, "it's virtually impossible that the conservative Legislature or state regulators would go along."

The Tampa Bay Times called Amendment 2 "a ridiculous amendment that doesn't belong in the state constitution, whether you are an outdoors enthusiast or not." They went on to say that hunting and fishing "are wildly popular pastimes that are engrained in Florida culture," and that "You might as well amend Florida's constitution to protect cockroaches, humidity and golf."

The Sun Sentinel did not support the measure, explaining that, "The Florida Constitution recognizes only a handful of rights," and that "Most of those rights come with exemptions". "But no guardrails constrain a 'public right' to fish and hunt. Nothing for private landowners to keep hunters off their land. No carve-out for endangered species. Not even a 'please don't shoot squirrels on a playground where kids are present.'"

The Palm Beach Post "strongly urge[d] voters to vote 'no' on this troublesome amendment," writing that it came "with big problems that should alarm anyone who appreciates the state's wildlife and natural habitats," and that "If there were ever a right that doesn't belong enshrined in the Florida Constitution, it's this one."

TC Palm recommended individuals to vote no on the ballot measure, reasoning that it had "been almost 190 years since Florida created its constitution," and so they saw "no reason to change the constitution for something that has never been a source of controversy."

== Results ==
All 67 of Florida's counties voted in favor. Calhoun County had the highest percentage vote in favor, with 87%, and Alachua County had the least, with 52%.

The following table details the results by county:

County	Yes		No	
County	#	%	#	%
Alachua	68,600	51.66	64,182	48.34
Baker	12,511	85.25	2,164	14.75
Bay	75,989	79.54	19,548	20.46
Bradford	10,772	80.81	2,558	19.19
Brevard	237,181	56.74	180,810	43.26
Broward	485,703	59.73	327,493	40.27
Calhoun	5,450	86.51	850	13.49
Charlotte	85,251	73.13	31,331	26.87
Citrus	70,138	75.49	22,773	24.51
Clay	89,884	74.11	31,403	25.89
Collier	144,553	71.46	57,742	28.54
Columbia	26,748	81.83	5,940	18.17
DeSoto	9,359	78.93	2,499	21.07
Dixie	6,605	82.89	1,363	17.11
Duval	302,807	67.24	147,498	32.76
Escambia	113,671	72.69	42,709	27.31
Flagler	53,254	71.01	21,744	28.99
Franklin	4,859	73.42	1,759	26.58
Gadsden	16,029	74.45	5,500	25.55
Gilchrist	8,600	81.51	1,951	18.49
Glades	4,169	81.38	954	18.62
Gulf	7,023	81.85	1,557	18.15
Hamilton	4,587	81.94	1,011	18.06
Hardee	6,358	81.18	1,474	18.82
Hendry	10,211	78.98	2,718	21.02
Hernando	81,882	76.69	24,895	23.31
Highlands	38,240	77.95	10,819	22.05
Hillsborough	413,250	64.57	226,766	35.43
Holmes	7,626	85.19	1,326	14.81
Indian River	67,038	71.82	26,303	28.18
Jackson	17,940	82.70	3,752	17.30
Jefferson	6,113	73.39	2,216	26.61
Lafayette	3,166	85.45	539	14.55
Lake	151,555	70.29	64,065	29.71
Lee	263,073	72.68	98,885	27.32
Leon	85,355	56.78	64,968	43.22
Levy	18,138	76.98	5,424	23.02
Liberty	2,977	86.79	453	13.21
Madison	7,183	80.66	1,722	19.34
Manatee	154,118	70.46	64,609	29.54
Marion	153,462	74.81	51,675	25.19
Martin	67,524	71.22	27,289	28.78
Miami-Dade	659,670	65.45	348,269	34.55
Monroe	28,533	67.30	13,861	32.70
Nassau	47,428	75.20	15,644	24.80
Okaloosa	83,490	75.79	26,675	24.21
Okeechobee	12,857	82.25	2,775	17.75
Orange	320,855	55.87	253,474	44.13
Osceola	113,190	69.41	49,891	30.59
Palm Beach	456,181	64.40	252,212	35.60
Pasco	214,373	71.61	84,999	28.39
Pinellas	308,997	63.70	176,092	36.30
Polk	242,374	73.14	89,032	26.86
Putnam	27,564	79.18	7,247	20.82
St. Johns	126,533	67.74	60,250	32.26
St. Lucie	124,598	71.40	49,906	28.60
Santa Rosa	82,805	76.49	25,458	23.51
Sarasota	178,514	67.55	85,751	32.45
Seminole	139,622	57.69	102,382	42.31
Sumter	76,356	76.99	22,820	23.01
Suwannee	17,167	80.19	4,240	19.81
Taylor	8,188	85.13	1,430	14.87
Union	5,081	83.46	1,007	16.54
Volusia	206,293	69.33	91,272	30.67
Wakulla	14,206	73.17	5,209	26.83
Walton	37,175	77.54	10,769	22.46
Washington	10,305	83.17	2,085	16.83
Total	6,941,307	67.34	3,365,987	32.66

== See also ==
- Hunting in the United States
