= Heartbeat Protection Act =

2023 Florida state law

Florida Legislature
- Citation: Chapter n. 2023-21
- Signed by: Governor Ron DeSantis
- Signed: April 13, 2023
- Effective: May 1, 2024

Legislative history
- Bill citation: Senate Bill 300
- Introduced by: Erin Grall
- Passed: April 3, 2023
- Passed: April 13, 2023

The Heartbeat Protection Act (Senate Bill 300 or SB 300) is a Florida state law passed in 2023 that criminalizes abortion after 6 weeks of gestation. The law went into effect May 1, 2024, after being adopted in 2023. Under Florida's current abortion ban, it is nearly impossible for most women to access an abortion. Florida's ban provides no exceptions for rape or incest after 15 weeks' gestation, which is eleven weeks after a missed period.

== History ==
The bill was introduced by Erin Grall in the Florida House of Representatives on March 13, 2023.

Many experts concur that the vast majority of sexual assault victims do not report their assault, often out of fear of retaliation, feelings of shame and experiencing trauma, concern for having to relive their experiences before law enforcement or a court, and the need for time and space to heal and feel safe. Florida's abortion ban has no real exception for a fatal fetal abnormality that is discovered later in pregnancy, after approximately twenty weeks from the pregnant woman's first missed period. Florida's abortion ban contains a very narrow exception to “save the pregnant woman's life or avert a serious risk of substantial and irreversible physical impairment of a major bodily function - This determination must be made by two physicians, certified in writing.

Florida's ban also criminalizes the delivery of abortion pills through the mail and criminalizes telehealth appointments.

Florida's abortion ban imposes legal penalties for doctors who violate the ban by making it a third-degree felony with up to five years in prison, up to a $5000 fine, and potentially losing their medical license. The ban states that "any person who willfully performs, or actively participates in, a termination of pregnancy in violation" of the law "commits a felony of the third-degree." Unlike many other states, Florida's ban does not clearly exempt pregnant women themselves from criminal prosecution.

The bill passed the Florida Legislature on April 13, 2023. Governor Ron DeSantis signed it into law on the same day in a meeting behind closed-doors with a few selected guests.

== Legislative history ==
House of Representatives vote
Republican YEA (70)
Republican NAY (7)
Democratic NAY (33)
No Vote (9)

Senate vote
Republican YEA (26)
Republican NAY (2)
Democratic NAY (11)
No Vote (1)
