= 2024 Florida elections =

A general election took place in the U.S. state of Florida on November 5, 2024.

== Federal ==
- 2024 United States presidential election in Florida
- 2024 United States House of Representatives elections in Florida
- 2024 United States Senate election in Florida

== State ==
- 2024 Florida House of Representatives election
- 2024 Florida Senate election

== Local ==
- 2024 Miami-Dade County mayoral election
- 2024 Volusia County chair election

== Ballot measures ==
- 2024 Florida Amendment 3 (Marijuana Legalization Initiative)
- 2024 Florida Amendment 4 (Right to Abortion Initiative)
