= Erin Grall =

American politician (born 1977)

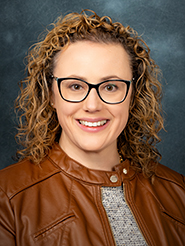
- Grall in 2022

Member of the Florida Senate from the 29th district
- Incumbent
- Assumed office November 8, 2022
- Preceded by: Debbie Mayfield (redistricting)

Member of the Florida House of Representatives from the 54th district
- In office November 8, 2016 – November 8, 2022
- Preceded by: Debbie Mayfield
- Succeeded by: Robbie Brackett

Personal details
- Born: June 30, 1977 (age 49) Vero Beach, Florida, U.S.
- Party: Republican

Erin Grall (born June 30, 1977) is an American politician who served in the Florida House of Representatives from the 54th district from 2016 to 2022 and has served in the Florida Senate since 2022. In the Florida Legislature, she has sponsored bills that have become law.

== Florida Legislature ==
=== House of Representatives ===
In 2018, Grall voted against the Marjory Stoneman Douglas High School Public Safety Act. The bill banned bump stocks, raised the minimum age to purchase a firearm from 18 to 21, expanded the 3-day waiting period to rifles, and enacted red flag laws in the state.

In 2019, Grall introduced a bill to require minors to obtain consent from at least one parent prior to obtaining an abortion. Her bill passed the Florida House on April 17, 2019, but the bill stalled and eventually died in the more moderate Florida Senate. That same year, Grall introduced a parental rights bill that would recognize rights with regard to a "minor child's education, upbringing, & health care." It was not given a vote in the House.

In 2020, Grall reintroduced the parental consent for abortion bill and parents' rights legislation. After receiving the endorsement of Governor Ron DeSantis, the Legislature passed the abortion bill. It was signed on June 30, 2020. The parental rights bill again did not receive a vote.

In 2021, Grall reintroduced the Parents' Bill of Rights, legislation similar to what she had introduced in prior years. The bill passed the Legislature on April 22 and received the signature of DeSantis on June 29. Grall also introduced legislation to prohibit "disability abortion," though the Florida Senate did not take up the bill.

In 2022, Grall introduced HB 5, which prohibits abortions in the state after 15 weeks of pregnancy, with exceptions for the life and physical health of the pregnant woman, as well as fatal fetal abnormalities. The bill passed, and DeSantis signed the legislation on April 14. In anticipation of the United States Supreme Court's decision in Dobbs v. Jackson Women's Health Organization, the legislation had an effective date of July 1. On June 24, 2022, the court eliminated the constitutional right to abortion. The legislation was allowed to take effect as challenges in state court proceed. In 2022, after two women in Florida, both of whom had been undergoing fertility treatment, experienced pre-viability preterm prelabor rupture of membranes (PPROM) in their second trimesters, were denied treatment, and developed serious complications, Grall accused physicians of intentionally misinterpreting the bill in such cases for political reasons.

Additionally, Grall and Alex Andrade introduced the Parental Rights in Education Act, which prohibits instruction on sexual orientation and gender identity in kindergarten through third grade.

=== Senate ===
After being elected to the Florida Senate in 2023, Grall introduced the Heartbeat Protection Act. The legislation makes abortion after 6 weeks illegal except in the event of rape, incest, human trafficking, a fatal fetal abnormality diagnosis, or when the pregnant woman's life is in danger. It also prevents state funds from being used to finance agencies that provide abortion or to help a pregnant woman travel to another state to receive an abortion, and outlaws the delivery of abortion pills through the mail. The bill passed the Florida Legislature on April 13, 2023, and DeSantis signed it into law on the same day. During debate on the bill, Grall called the legislation "a compromise" because she believes that abortion in all cases "meets the definition of murder." The bill is currently blocked until a decision is rendered by the Florida Supreme Court on the status of abortion in Florida.

Grall introduced legislation, later signed by DeSantis, to restrict certain restrooms based on biological sex. She also introduced a bill to ban "diversity, equity, and inclusion" at public universities, but the references to those initiatives were stripped prior to the bill's passage.

Grall has introduced several bills in the 2024 session. SB 1044 would authorize "school districts and charter schools to adopt a policy to allow volunteer school chaplains." SB 1590 would tighten penalties for prostitution in the state. SB 1788 would prohibit minors under the age of 16 from using social media sites and require the use of age verification to access such websites. SB 1792 would prohibit minors from accessing "harmful" websites, specifically those that depict sexual conduct; the legislation would also require such websites conduct age verification. SB 1472 would require video cameras be placed in certain public Florida classrooms. SB 1722 would prohibit "the initiation of a child protective investigation or removal of a child from his or her residence solely based on a parent's religious beliefs or ideology." SB 436 and SB 1442 would expand pregnancy support services offered by the Florida Department of Health.
