= J. Slater Smith =

American politician

J. Slater Smith (7 December 1879 - 17 May 1943) was an American politician from Reidsville, Georgia.

== Early life and education ==
Smith was born and raised in Georgia. In 1900 he graduated from the University of Georgia, got married, and moved to Green Cove Springs, Florida. In Florida Smith found success in the naval stores industry.

== Political career ==
Smith worked in Florida politics for over three decades. He served as sheriff of Clay County for one term. Then alternated between representing Clay County in the State House, and the 29th district in the State Senate from 1911 to his death in 1943.

== See also ==
- Knabb Turpentine
