= Lauren Book =

American politician (born 1984)

- Official portrait, 2026

Member of the Florida Senate
- Incumbent
- Assumed office November 3, 2026
- Preceded by: Tina Polsky
- Constituency: 30th district (2026–present)
- In office November 8, 2016 – November 5, 2024
- Preceded by: Redistricted
- Succeeded by: Barbara Sharief
- Constituency: 35th district (2016–2024)

Minority Leader of the Florida Senate
- In office April 28, 2021 – November 19, 2024
- Preceded by: Gary Farmer
- Succeeded by: Jason Pizzo

Personal details
- Born: Lauren Frances Book; October 12, 1984 (age 42) Hollywood, Florida, U.S.
- Party: Democratic
- Spouse(s): Kris Lim (m. 2008; div. 2010) Blair Byrnes (m. 2015)
- Children: 2
- Education: University of Miami (BA, MS)

Lauren Frances Book (born October 12, 1984) is an American politician and former educator serving as a member of the Florida Senate, representing the 30th district since 2026. A member of the Democratic Party, she previously represented the 35th district in the Florida Senate from 2016 to 2024 and was the Senate minority leader from 2021 to 2024.

== Early life and education ==
Book was born in Hollywood, Florida, in 1984 to Patricia "Pat" Book, a former chocolate retailer, and Ron Book, a lawyer and lobbyist. She is the oldest of three siblings. Book was sexually abused as a child over the course of six years by her nanny. She developed anorexia as a result of the abuse. In 2002, the nanny pleaded guilty to five felony charges and was sentenced to 10 years in prison, later extended to 25 years. In 2007, Book created a charity, Lauren's Kids, to fight for stronger penalties for sex offenders.

Book graduated from the University of Miami in 2008 with a Bachelor of Arts degree in Elementary education. Following graduation, she taught for one year in Miami-Dade County Public Schools.

Since 2010, Book has annually led "Walk in My Shoes", a 1,500-mile (2,400 km) walk from Key West, to Tallahassee, Florida. She has written two books: Lauren's Kingdom and It's OK to Tell: A Story of Hope and Recovery. She designed an abuse prevention curriculum for implementation in Florida kindergartens.

In 2012, Book was awarded her master's degree in community psychology from the University of Miami.

== Career ==
Book ran unopposed for the 32nd district seat in the Florida Senate in 2016. In the 2017 session, Book filed a bill that would remove Confederate Memorial Day, celebrated on April 26, 2017, from Florida's list of 21 legal holidays. Her bill would also remove the birthdays of Robert E. Lee and Jefferson Davis as official state holidays. Book told CBS4, "during a time when the country is completely divided, I think we look at celebrating our unique coming together instead of some of the things that kind of create hate and divisive environments."

On July 22, 2019, Book wrote Florida governor Ron DeSantis a letter requesting a probe into how the Palm Beach County Sheriff's Office handled a work release program for Jeffrey Epstein. Following her request, Book reported that she began receiving calls from political supporters of Palm Beach County Sheriff Ric Bradshaw, asking her to drop the request for an inquiry. The Miami Herald reported that Book also received multiple anonymous calls and texts with more ominous demands to halt her request for a probe.

Book voted against the controversial Florida Senate Bill 86, which would have changed the implementation and administration of the Bright Futures Scholarship Program.

After the Democrats' incoming Senate leader for 2022–24, Bobby Powell, decided to run for Congress, the Democratic caucus unanimously chose Book to be its leader for the 2022–24 legislature. A week later, on April 28, 2021, the Democratic caucus chose Book to serve immediately as minority leader, following a no-confidence vote in then-leader Gary Farmer.

In 2022, Book faced a primary challenger, former Broward County Mayor Barbara Sharief. The race devolved into a bitter battle between the two candidates, and Book's absenteeism from her district was made an issue by the Sharief campaign. Book ultimately won her primary, after being endorsed by Broward County Commissioner Steven A. Geller, the Sierra Club, the South Florida Sun Sentinel, the Florida Education Association, and Pembroke Pines Democratic Club President Lourdes Diaz. Notably, the Sentinel's endorsement was made with "little enthusiasm" because of the nastiness of the race.

On April 3, 2023, Book was arrested alongside Nikki Fried, the Chair of the Florida Democratic Party, following a protest of an anti-abortion bill being considered by state lawmakers. The bill would ban abortions after six weeks. Book and ten others were arrested for trespassing after the Tallahassee Police Department instructed them to disperse by sunset, which they did not do.

On April 28, 2023, Book was the sole vote against a successful joint resolution which proposed an amendment to the state constitution to preserve forever fishing, hunting, and taking of fish and wildlife as a public right and preferred means of managing and controlling fish and wildlife. This amendment eventually passed by a ballot measure in 2024, and is in the Florida state constitution.

== Personal life ==
Book married Kris Lim, a professional golfer, in 2008; their wedding was featured on We TV's Platinum Weddings. They divorced in 2010. In 2015, she married Blair Byrnes. They are the parents of twins, born on February 16, 2017.

In 2021, a 19-year-old Floridian was charged with cyberstalking and attempting to extort Book, threatening to release nude images of her. Book later learned that the images have been bought and sold since 2020.

Florida Senate
Preceded by Joe Negron	Member of the Florida Senate from the 32nd district 2016–2024	Succeeded by Barbara Sharief
Preceded by Gary Farmer	Minority Leader of the Florida Senate; 2021–2024	Succeeded by Jason Pizzo
