= Florida's 23rd Senate district =

Florida's 23rd State Senate district
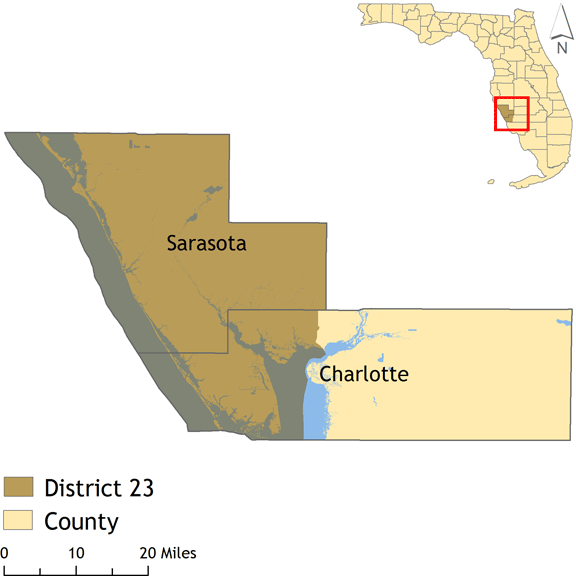
Senator
Danny Burgess; R–Zephyrhills

Florida's 23rd Senate district elects one member to the Florida State Senate. It contains parts of Hillsborough County and Pasco County. It previously contained parts of Sarasota County and Charlotte County.

== Members ==
- Greg Steube (2016–2018)
- Danny Burgess (since 2022)
