= Summerfield, Florida =

- Unincorporated community
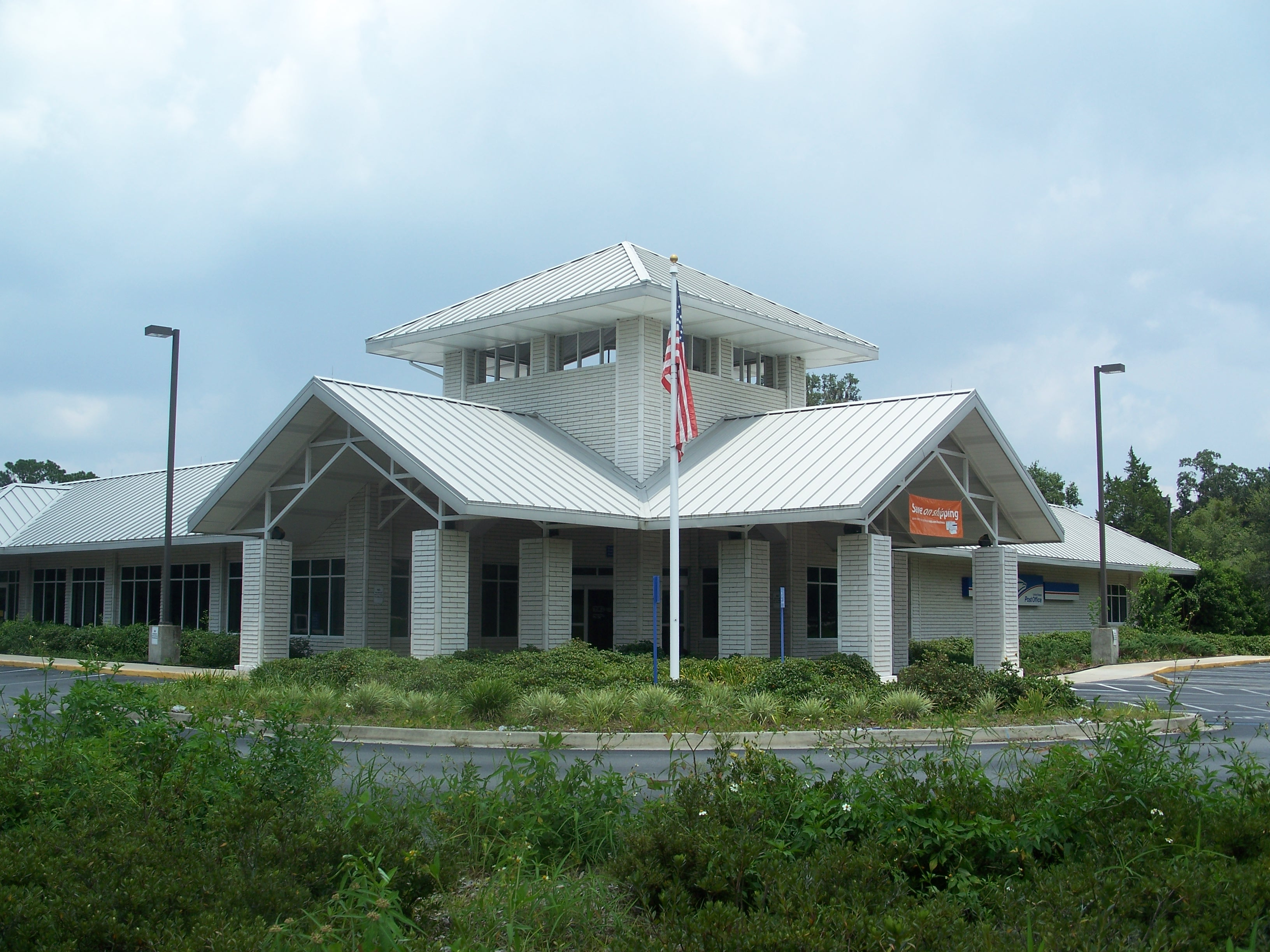
- Post office of Summerfield, FL

- Location within Florida Location within the United States
- Coordinates: 29°00′30″N 82°02′06″W
- Country: United States
- State: Florida
- County: Marion
- Time zone: UTC-5 (EST)
  - Summer (DST): UTC-4 (EDT)
- ZIP code(s): 34491, 34492
- Area code: 352

Summerfield is an unincorporated community in Marion County, Florida, United States. It is located near the intersection of US 301 and County Road 475A. The community is part of the Ocala Metropolitan Statistical Area.

== History ==
A post office called Summerfield has been in operation since 1885. The community was named for Col. Adam G. Summer, a local cattleman and land owner.

=== Whitesville/Summerfield History ===
In 1856, Colonel Adam G. Summer relocated from Pomaria, SC, to Marion County, where he took up residence on a vast expanse of 1,400 acres known as Watula, or Long Hammock. Here, on what came to be known as the Summer Plantation, Colonel Summer dedicated himself to the enhancement of livestock through crossbreeding and initiated trials with various grass types. Livestock, particularly cattle initially acquired from William Edwards in Micanopy, captivated his interest, leading him to introduce new bloodlines from abroad.

The year 1860 saw Colonel Summer's importation of six Brahman calves from the East Indies, a move that also introduced Bremen geese, other poultry, several exquisite horses, and an English Foxhound to the plantation. By 1866, the plantation was home to fifty Brahma cattle of superior quality among other animals. Post-Civil War, Colonel Summer was notable for granting each of his former slaves a piece of land and a shack, providing them with a tangible form of independence. These freed individuals settled in a broad area stretching from Belleview to the Sumter County Line. Colonel Summer's life and his agricultural and livestock projects concluded with his death in 1866.

After the Civil War, Charles H. White ventured to Florida, establishing himself in the community of Watula, Long Hammock. Taking on roles such as postmaster, he also inaugurated the first general store, situated where the Methodist Church of Summerfield stands today. This burgeoning community also boasted a school, blacksmith shop, sawmill, gristmill, cotton gin, Methodist church, an express telegraph office, and a shipping station. Land, yet to be cultivated, was sold at $10 an acre, with cotton, oranges, and vegetables being the primary crops.

The year 1873 marked the renaming of Watula, Long Hammock, to Whitesville, in honor of Charles H. White, located just three-quarters of a mile west of what is now Summerfield, along the northern shores of Summers Lake.

Fletcher Fink, owning the land north of Whitesville, rebuffed a 1880 railroad request for a right of way through his property. This refusal led the railroad to divert its route eastward, significantly impacting Whitesville by choosing not to establish a station there. This decision severely affected Whitesville, with a new station named Like Weir being established two miles east. A decade later, a spur connected this station directly to Lake Weir at Weirsdale.

In 1887, a resolution led to construction of a new railroad station in Whitesville, attracting more settlers from the Carolinas, Georgia, and Alabama. By 1888, in tribute to Colonel Adam G. Summer, Whitesville's name was changed to Summerfield, commemorating its founding figure.
