= Danny Burgess =

American politician

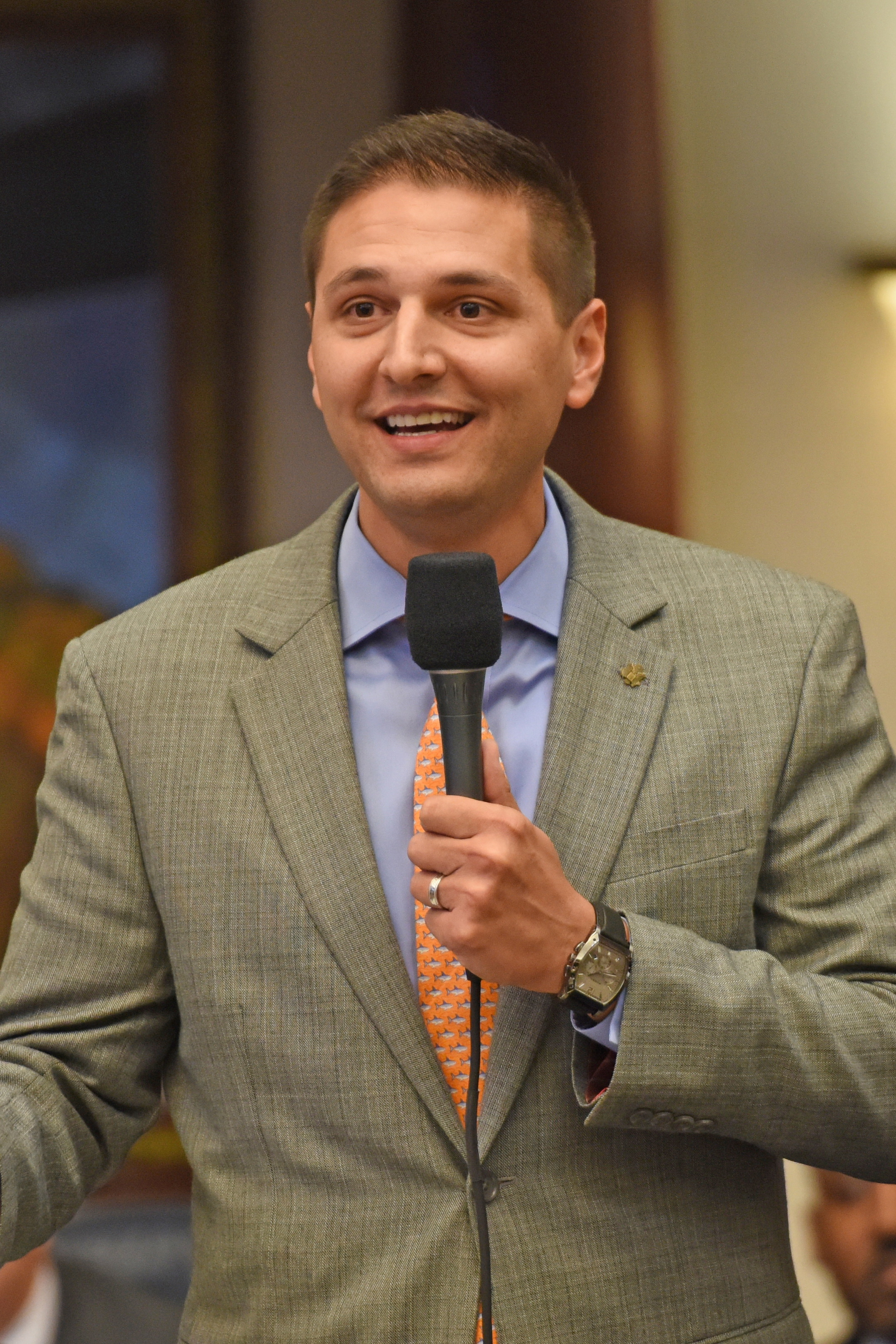

Member of the Florida Senate
- Incumbent
- Assumed office November 3, 2020
- Preceded by: Tom Lee
- Constituency: 20th district (2020–2022); 23rd district (2022–present)

Executive Director of the Florida Department of Veterans' Affairs
- In office January 24, 2019 – June 18, 2020
- Preceded by: Glenn Sutphin
- Succeeded by: Vacant

Member of the Florida House of Representatives from the 38th district
- In office November 4, 2014 – January 24, 2019
- Preceded by: Will Weatherford
- Succeeded by: Randy Maggard

Mayor of Zephyrhills
- In office April 9, 2013 – November 4, 2014
- Preceded by: Steve Van Gorden
- Succeeded by: Gene Whitfield

Personal details
- Born: June 1, 1986 (age 40) Zephyrhills, Florida, U.S.
- Party: Republican
- Spouse: Courtney Anne Burgess
- Children: Adeline Belle Burgess, Daniel Wright Burgess III, Eleanor Rose Burgess
- Education: University of South Florida (B.A.); Dwayne O. Andreas School of Law (J.D.)
- Profession: Attorney

Daniel Wright Burgess Jr. (born June 1, 1986) is an American politician who currently serves as a Florida State Senator from District 20, which includes parts of Tampa, Thonotosassa, New Tampa, and Zephyrhills. He previously served as the executive director of the Florida Department of Veterans' Affairs, as a member of the Florida House of Representatives, and as the mayor of Zephyrhills.

== History ==
Burgess was born in Zephyrhills, Florida, in 1986 and attended the University of South Florida. While a college student, he was elected to the Zephyrhills City Council in 2005, defeating Celia Graham with about 60 percent of the votes. Burgess was re-elected in 2007, defeating Richard Kaeberlein with 82 percent of the vote, and he served as President of the City Council. In 2008, after he graduated with a degree in political science, he resigned from the City Council to attend the Dwayne O. Andreas School of Law in Orlando, graduating with his Juris Doctor in 2011. Upon graduation, he was commissioned in the Judge Advocate General's Corps of the U.S. Army Reserve as a first lieutenant and continues to serve in the rank of captain. He also began practicing with Johnson, Auvil, Pratico & Chane PA. After the Mayor of Zephyrhills resigned after he faced impeachment proceedings over allegations of sexual harassment, Burgess ran in a special election to succeed him, and won, serving out the final year of the previous mayor's term. He did not run for re-election in 2014.

== Florida House of Representatives ==
In 2014, incumbent State Representative Will Weatherford was unable to seek re-election due to term limits, so Burgess ran to succeed him. He won the Republican primary unopposed, and advanced to the general election, where he faced retired social studies teacher Beverly Ledbetter. During the campaign, the Tampa Bay Times endorsed Ledbetter over him, criticizing Burgess for not having a "similar grasp of state issues" as Ledbetter and for having uninformed priorities. However, Burgess won against Ledbetter with 60 percent of the vote.

Burgess was re-elected unopposed in 2016. Independent candidate David T. K. Hayes challenged him in 2018, but Burgess won re-election with 66 percent of the vote.

== Department of Veterans' Affairs ==
On December 15, 2018, Governor-elect Ron DeSantis announced that he would appoint Burgess as executive director of the Florida Department of Veterans' Affairs. Burgess's appointment was unanimously approved by the Cabinet on January 24, 2019.

== Florida Senate ==
After Senator Tom Lee announced in May 2020 that he would retire early from the Florida Senate, Burgess announced he would run in the special election to succeed him. Burgess was unopposed in the Republican primary and defeated Democratic nominee Kathy Lewis in the general election, 54.8 to 45.2 percent.

In January 2021 Burgess introduced legislation to protect Confederate monuments; permit the state to overrule local governments' decisions to reduce funding for police; waive sovereign immunity for municipalities, thereby allowing local authorities to be sued for providing inadequate law enforcement; and block people injured while participating in protests from receiving damages. American Civil Liberties Union lawyer Kara Gross described the bill as an attempt "to silence and criminalize Black protesters and their allies who are exercising their First Amendment rights."
