= Seth French =

American politician (1824–1896)

Seth French (May 2, 1824 – January 29, 1896) was an American Civil War veteran from the Union army, as well as a state senator.

== Early life and education ==
French was born in Potsdam, New York in 1824. In 1843 he began his physicians apprenticeship, finishing four years later in 1847. He first practiced medicine in Carthage, New York, but left for California in 1848. In 1850 he returned to New York and married his wife Harriot Guyot, and had three children.

== Civil War service ==
Dr. French served as a surgeon for the 21st and 35th New York Regiments during the Civil War.

== Post-war life ==
After the war Dr. French lived in Eau Claire, Wisconsin for a period, until settling in Sanford, Florida. While in Florida he successfully established a citrus orchard, and convinced much of his family to migrate to Orange City, Florida. While living in Orange City he participated in the 1879 Orange County Fair winning an award for the best peck lemons.

== Political career ==
Dr. French served one term in the Florida Senate representing district 29 in 1879. After this he was appointed as Florida's first Commissioner of Immigration serving from 1879 to 1881.
