= Keith Perry (politician) =

American politician from Florida

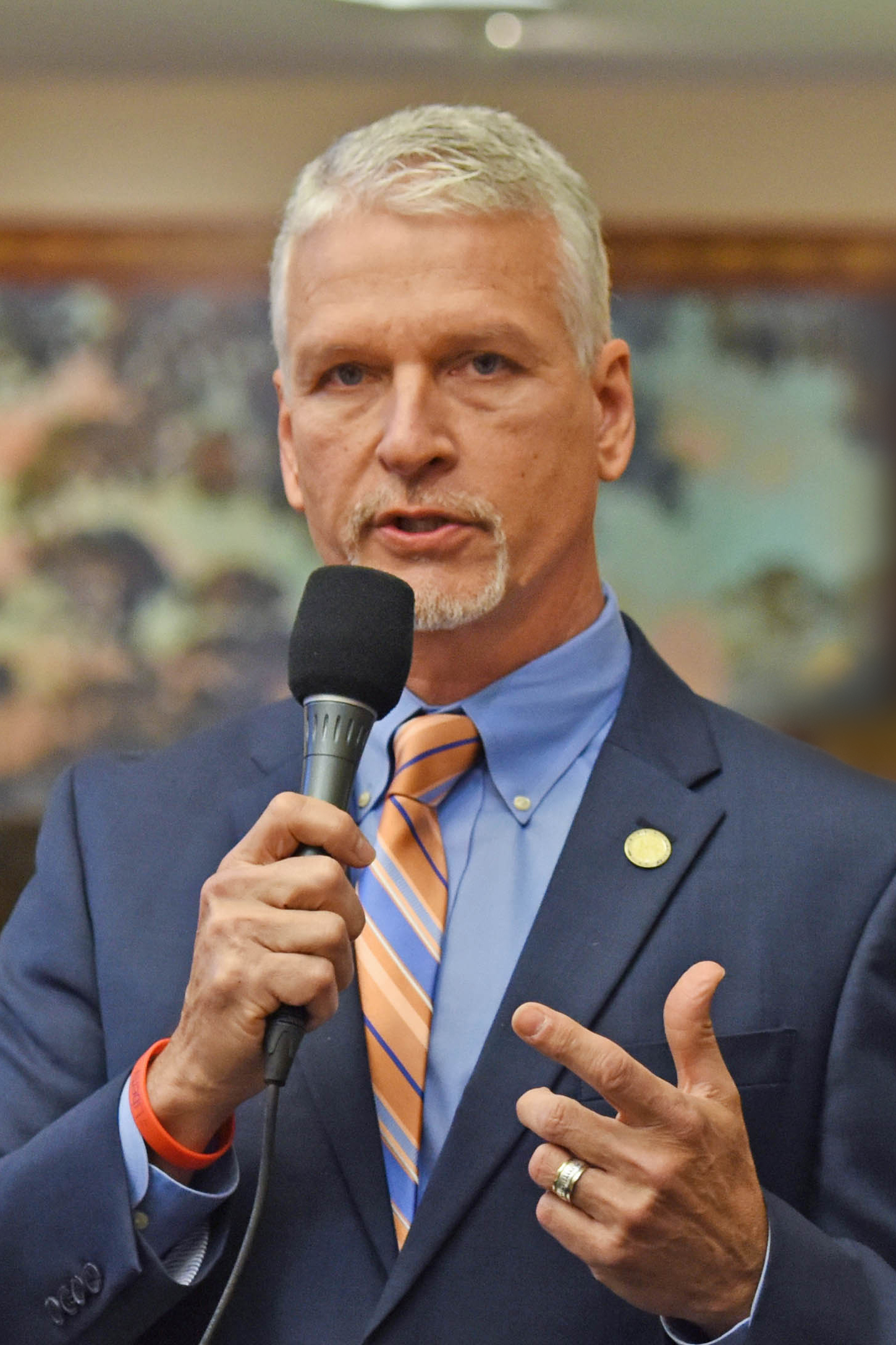

Member of the Florida Senate
- In office November 8, 2016 – November 5, 2024
- Preceded by: Redistricted
- Succeeded by: Stan McClain
- Constituency: 8th district (2016–2022); 9th district (2022–2024)

Member of the Florida House of Representatives
- In office November 2, 2010 – November 8, 2016
- Preceded by: Larry Cretul
- Succeeded by: Chuck Clemons
- Constituency: 22nd district (2010–2012); 21st district (2012–2016)

Personal details
- Born: December 3, 1958 (age 67) Tallahassee, Florida
- Party: Republican
- Spouse: Amy S. Cekander
- Children: Alexis, Amanda
- Profession: Roofing contractor

Warren "Keith" Perry (born December 3, 1958) is a Republican former member of the Florida Senate, representing the 9th district, encompassing Alachua, Putnam, and part of Marion County in North Central Florida, from 2016 to 2024. He also served in the Florida House of Representatives, representing the 22nd district from 2010 to 2012 and the 21st district from 2012 to 2016.

== History ==
Keith Perry was born in Tallahassee and attended Buchholz High School in Gainesville, and after graduating, started Keith Perry Roofing Contractors, which became a successful roofing company in Florida. He also founded the House of Hope, a Christian-affiliated rehabilitation center for recently released prisoners.

== Florida Legislature ==
=== House of Representatives ===
In 2010, when incumbent Republican State Representative Larry Cretul, the Speaker of the House, could not seek re-election due to term limits, Perry ran to succeed him in the 22nd District, which included southern Alachua County, eastern Levy County, and western Marion County. In the Republican primary, he defeated Remzey Samarrai and John Patrick Deakins, winning 44% of the vote. He encountered Democratic nominee Jon Paugh in the general election, and he won election to his first term convincingly, with 61% of the vote.

When Florida House districts were redrawn in 2012, Keith Perry ran for re-election in the 21st District, which constituted vastly different territory than the 22nd District, but included Gainesville, where he lives. He was unopposed in the Republican primary, and in the general election, he faced Andrew Morey, the Democratic nominee. Because Keith Perry had not represented most of the territory in the legislature and the fact that Morey had not run for office before, they "were unfamiliar faces in broad swaths of District 21." In the end, Perry was re-elected with 57% of the vote.

While in the legislature, Keith Perry was the sponsor of legislation that would extend "foster care from age 18 to 21," so as to ensure that foster children who turn 18 but have not obtained their high school diploma are not left entirely on their own.

=== Senate ===
In 2016, after court-ordered redistricting, Perry ran for newly drawn open Senate seat anchored by Alachua County. He defeated former state senator Rod Smith in the general election, 52.6 to 47.4%. Perry stated that his goals for the term included reducing taxes, reducing government regulation, and increasing funding for the arts and music in elementary schools.

== Campaign sign incident ==
In September 2016, Perry was investigated for battery for slapping a man's neck after the man took down a campaign sign. The complaint against Perry was later withdrawn.

Florida House of Representatives
Preceded by Larry Cretul	Member of the Florida House of Representatives from the 22nd district 2010–2012	Succeeded by Charlie Stone
Preceded by Charles Van Zant	Member of the Florida House of Representatives from the 21st district 2012–2016	Succeeded by Chuck Clemons
Florida Senate
Preceded by Dorothy Hukill	Member of the Florida Senate from the 8th district 2016–present	Incumbent
