= Barbara Sharief =

American politician (born 1971)

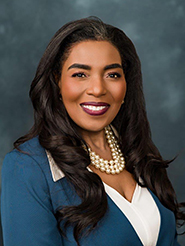

Member of the Florida Senate from the 35th district
- Incumbent
- Assumed office November 5, 2024
- Preceded by: Lauren Book

Personal details
- Born: November 7, 1971 (age 54) Miami, Florida, U.S.
- Party: Democratic
- Education: Miami Dade College (ASN); Florida International University (BSN, MSN); Wilkes University (DNP)
- Website: Official website

Barbara Muhammad Sharief (born November 7, 1971) is an American politician and nurse who has served as a member of the Florida Senate since 2024. She previously served as a Broward County commissioner from 2010 to 2021, serving as mayor from 2013 to 2014, and again from 2016 to 2017. She was the county's first African-American female mayor. Sharief is also a former Miramar city commissioner and vice mayor.

== Early life and education ==
Sharief was born in Miami Beach, Florida, and grew up in Miami and Broward County, one of eight children of a self-employed clothing salesman and a retired schoolteacher. In 1985, at age 14, her father, James Muhammad Sharief, was shot and killed by a 15-year-old robber. She began work soon after to support her family.

Sharief attended North Miami Senior High School. After high school, she earned an Associate of Science in Nursing from Miami Dade Community College followed by a registered nurse diploma from Jackson Memorial Hospital School of Nursing. She later attained a Bachelor of Science in Nursing, a Master of Science in Nursing, and an advanced registered nurse practitioner certification from Florida International University. She then earned a Doctor of Nursing Practice from Wilkes University

== Career ==
=== Nursing ===
After graduation, Sharief worked for Jackson Memorial Hospital, followed by a national home health agency. In 2001, she founded South Florida Pediatric Homecare, Inc. The company provides home healthcare services for children and adults who would otherwise need to stay in a hospital or intensive care environment.

=== Politics ===
In 2009, Sharief was elected to the Miramar City Commission. She served as the vice mayor in 2010. While serving on the City Commission, she donated her annual salary to charities. In May 2010, Sharief filed to run for the Broward County Commission District 8 seat being vacated by Diana Wasserman-Rubin. In November 2010, she was elected to serve the residents of the cities of Miramar, Pembroke Pines, Weston, Southwest Ranches, Hallandale Beach, Pembroke Park and West Park. In 2012, she was named vice mayor of Broward County. In November 2013, the County Commission voted unanimously to appoint Sharief Broward's first African-American female mayor. In November 2014, she was re-elected to a second four-year term on the County Commission. In November 2015, Sharief was named vice mayor for the second time. In November 2016, Sharief was re-appointed mayor for the second time.

As county commissioner, Sharief served on several boards including the Broward County Metropolitan Planning Organization and on the Large Urban County Caucus and the Health Steering Committee for the National Association of Counties. In 2016, Sharief was elected President of the Florida Association of Counties. She is also a member of the National Democratic County Officials, the Urban League of Broward County, Miramar–Pembroke Pines Chamber of Commerce's Governmental Affairs committee, the Caribbean American Democratic Club, and Minority Women Business Enterprises.

Over the course of her political career, Sharief has been focused on the financial health of her constituents, enacting programs to provide foreclosure assistance and help residents get through the economic slump. She created Commissioner on a Mission, a program focused on the elderly, foreclosure, and unemployment issues. In 2013, Sharief proposed a countywide ban on pit bulls, similar to the one implemented in neighboring Miami-Dade County. She later withdrew requests for the ban in favor of calling for regulations on dog owners and new funds for animal control. Sharief was also instrumental in advocating for the completion of the Pembroke Road overpass off Miramar Parkway and Pines Boulevard. As mayor, Sharief oversaw the immediate response to the Fort Lauderdale airport shooting.

Sharief is a member of the Florida Nurses Association and was endorsed by the Florida Nurses Political Action Committee during her run for Florida State Senate in 2024.

== Lawsuits ==
In 2013, the Florida Agency for Health Care Administration concluded in a routine audit that Sharief's firm overbilled Medicaid for patient services by close to $500,000. The audit found that from June 2007 to March 2011, SFPH was overpaid for some services that were not covered by Medicaid. Sharief disputed the audit results, but agreed to "settle the matter rather than fight and continue to mount legal fees." In May 2013, Sharief signed an agreement to repay $540,328 over three years, an amount that includes the Medicaid overcharges as well as additional fines and costs According to the Agency for Health Care Administration, the settlement agreement did "not constitute an admission of wrongdoing or error by either party with respect to this case or any other matter."

In April 2014, the Florida Commission on Ethics announced that it had found probable cause to believe that Sharief violated state ethics laws and the state constitution by failing to properly disclose her financial interests for three years. An ethics commission investigator recommended that the Commission rule against Sharief, finding that she had filed inaccurate financial disclosure forms in 2010, 2011 and 2012. Sharief disputed the claims, but agreed to settle with the commission and paid a $1,000 fine for each violation. The Office of the State Attorney cleared Sharief of any wrongdoing stating there was no evidence that she "fraudulently falsified any document belonging to any public office in this state."

In July 2022, Barbara Sharief sued political opponent Lauren Book and a political committee after numerous allegedly libelous ads were circulated to the residents of Florida’s new 35th Senate District via mail, email, and text message allegedly paid for by Book and the committee.

== Personal life ==
While Sharief has stated that she has not visited a mosque since she was a teenager, she considers her position as Broward County's first Muslim mayor a platform against prejudices against Muslim people.

Political offices
| Preceded by Kristin Jacobs | Mayor of Broward County; 2013–2014 | Succeeded by Tim Ryan |
| Preceded by Marty Kiar | Mayor of Broward County; 2016–2017 | Succeeded by Beam Furr |
