= Richard Gentry (Florida politician) =

American politician from Florida

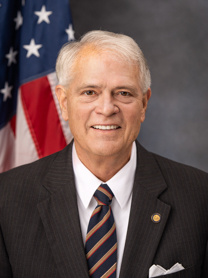
- Official portrait, c. 2024

Member of the Florida House of Representatives from the 27th district
- Incumbent
- Assumed office November 5, 2024
- Preceded by: Stan McClain

Personal details
- Born: Richard Gentry; May 1, 1951 (age 75) Daytona Beach, Florida, U.S.
- Party: Republican
- Spouse: Carol Stoutamire (m. 2006)
- Children: 2
- Education: University of Miami (BA, JD)
- Occupation: Politician; lawyer; lobbyist
- Website: voterichardgentry.com

Richard Gentry (born May 1, 1951) is an American politician, attorney, and lobbyist who currently serves as a Republican member of the Florida House of Representatives representing the 27th district, which includes parts of Lake, Marion, and Volusia County. He previously served as Public Counsel of Florida.

== Political career ==
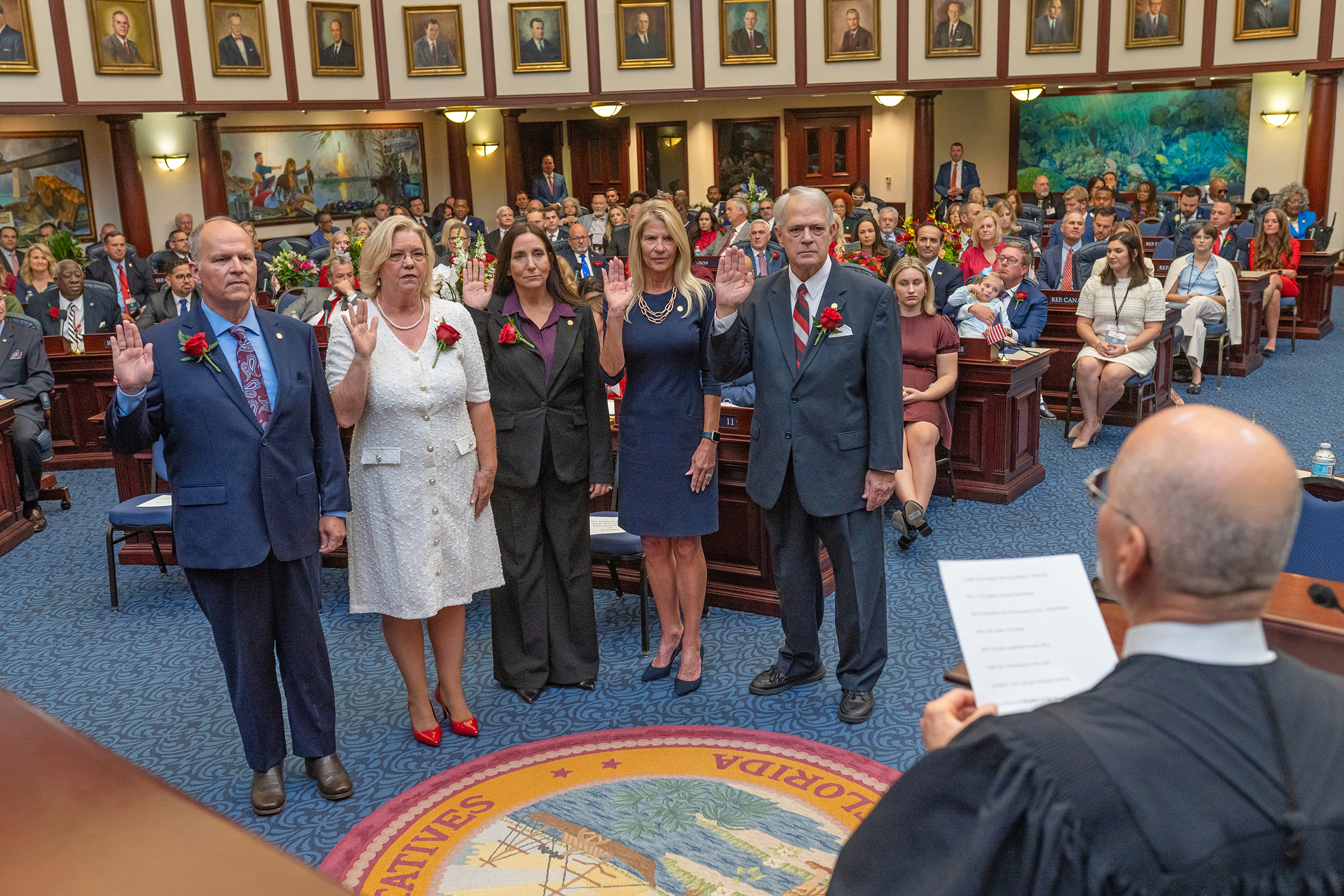
Swearing in of Florida State Representatives, 2024

Gentry was elected to the Florida House of Representatives in 2024. He was officially sworn into office on November 19, 2024.

== Personal life ==
Gentry married his wife Carol Stoutamire in 2006. They live in Lake County, Florida. He has two children and two grandchildren.

Florida House of Representatives
Preceded by Stan McClain	Member of the Florida House of Representatives from the 27th district 2024–present	Incumbent
