= Florida's 29th Senate district =

American legislative district

Florida's 29th State Senate district
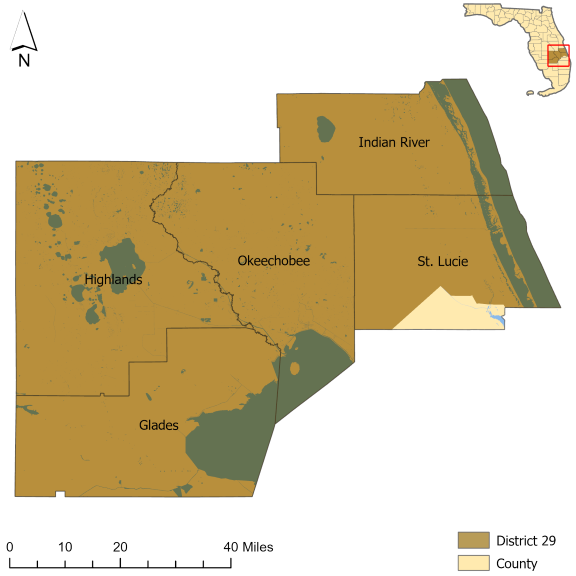
Senator
Erin Grall; R
- Demographics: 63% White; 14% Black; 18% Hispanic; 2% Asian; ~0% Native American; ~0% Hawaiian/Pacific Islander; 1% Other
- Population (2022): 540,379

Florida's 29th Senate district elects one member of the Florida Senate. The district consists of Glades, Highlands, Indian River, Okeechobee counties and part of St. Lucie county.

== Senators ==
- D. W. Whitehurst, 1865–1866
- Seth French, 1879–1881
- C. Delano, 1881–1887
- Walter A. Drake, 1889–1891
- F. A. Fleming, 1893–1895
- C. F. Barber, 1897–1899
- C. Fabian Law, 1901–1903
- E. E. Canova, 1905–1907
- William E. Baker, 1909–1912, 1917–1919
- Max M. Brown, 1913–1915
- T. J. Knabb, 1921–1923, 1929–1931
- J. Slater Smith, 1925–1927
- J. Edwin Larson, 1933
- J. D. Duggar, 1937–1939
- Edwin Fraser, 1945–1948, 1953–1955, 1961–1963 (died)
- J. Slater Smith Jr., 1949–1951
- Tom Adams, 1957–1959
- Merrill P. Barber, 1963–1968
- Elizabeth J. (Beth) Johnson, 1968–1971 (R)
- Chester W. (Chet) Stolzenburg, 1973–1976 (R)
- George Williamson, 1977–1980 (R)
- J. W. Stevens, 1981–1982 (R)
- Peter Weinstein, 1983–1992 (D)
- Ken Jenne, 1993–1997 (D)
- Steven Geller, 1998–2003 (D)
- M. Mandy Dawson, 2003–2008 (D)
- Jeremy Ring, 2012–2016(D)
- Kevin Rader, 2016–2020 (D)
- Tina Polsky, 2020–2022 (Redistricted to 30 in 2022) (D)
- Erin Grall, 2022–present (R)
