= Florida's 35th Senate district =

American legislative district

Florida's 35th State Senate district
Senator
Barbara Sharief; D–Plantation

Florida's 35th Senate district elects one member to the Florida State Senate. It contains parts of Broward County.

== Members ==
- Lauren Book (2016–2024)
- Barbara Sharief (since 2024)
