= Florida's 54th House of Representatives district =

Florida district

Florida's 54th State House of Representatives district
Representative
Randy Maggard; R–Zephyrhills

Florida's 54th House of Representatives district elects one member of the Florida House of Representatives. It covers parts of Pasco County.

== Members ==
- Randy Maggard (since 2022)
