= Stan McClain =

American politician

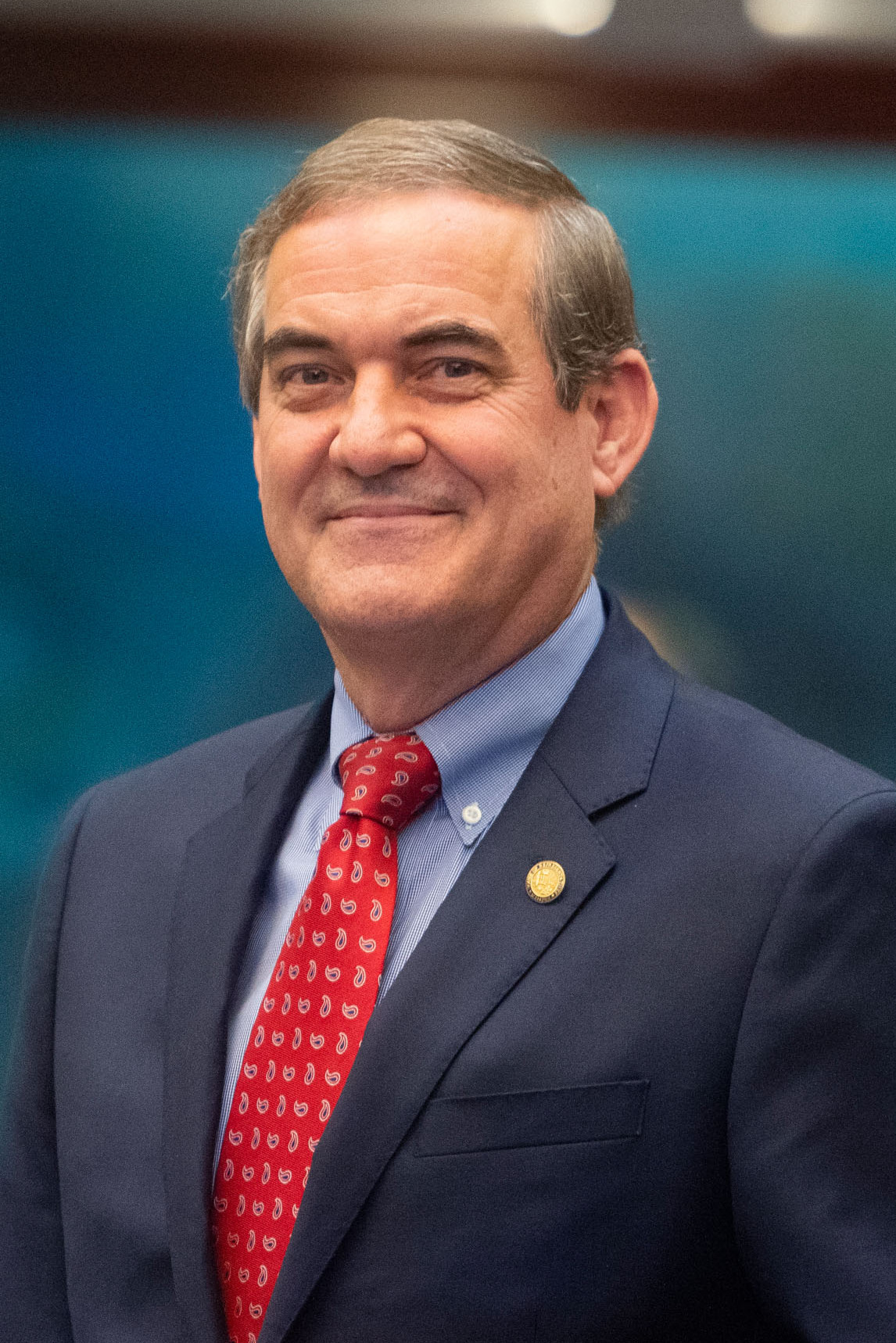

Member of the Florida Senate from the 9th district
- Incumbent
- Assumed office November 5, 2024
- Preceded by: Keith Perry

Member of the Florida House of Representatives
- In office November 8, 2016 – November 5, 2024
- Preceded by: Dennis K. Baxley
- Succeeded by: Richard Gentry
- Constituency: 23rd (2016–2022); 27th (2022–2024)

Personal details
- Born: July 7, 1961 (age 65) Norfolk, Virginia, U.S.
- Party: Republican
- Spouse: Jessica E. McClain
- Children: 11

Stan McClain (born July 7, 1961) is an American politician who has served in the Florida Senate since 2024, currently for the 9th district. He served in the Florida House of Representatives from 2016–2024 for the 23rd & 27th districts.

== Personal life ==
McClain's wife died in 2019 and he has 11 children. The campaign site states McClain is a building contractor. He served as a commissioner in Marion County.

== Views ==
Representative McClain co-sponsored a bill to require, for high school graduation, credit in United States Government comparative discussion of political ideologies which conflict with the principles of freedom and democracy.

Representative McClain co-sponsored a bill to repeal the voluntary firearm confiscation provisions of the Marjory Stoneman Douglas School Safety Act.

McClain has proposed pro-developer legislation making it easier to restricting local regulation.
