= Pasco County Sheriff's Office =

Law enforcement agency for Pasco County, Florida

Coordinates: 28.2672°N 82.6711°W

Pasco Sheriff's Office
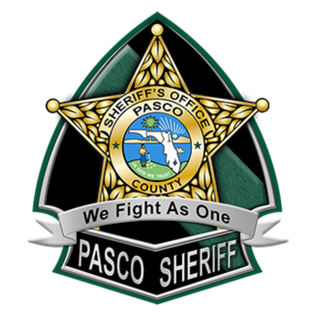
- Abbreviation: PSO
- Motto: 'We Fight As One'

Agency overview
- Formed: 1887; 139 years ago
- Annual budget: $162.4 million (2024)

Jurisdictional structure
- Legal jurisdiction: County

Operational structure
- Headquarters: 8661 Citizen Drive; New Port Richey, FL 34654
- Sworn members: 1,233
- Agency executive: Jeff Harrington, Sheriff

Facilities
- Stations: 3: District 1: New Port Richey; District 2: Dade City; District 3: Trinity
- Lockups: Detention Central: Land O Lakes

Website
- www.pascosheriff.com

The Pasco County Sheriff's Office (PSO) is the law enforcement agency responsible for Pasco County, Florida. It is the largest law enforcement agency within the county. The county Sheriff is Jeff Harrington since 2026.

== History ==
The current Sheriff is Jeff Harrington, who was appointed by Governor Ron DeSantis on November 4, 2026 after the previous sheriff, Chris Nocco resigned to run in a special election for state Senate District 21.

In February 2015, the Pasco Sheriff's Office (PSO) was the first Sheriff's Office in the central Florida region to adopt a full-scale body camera program. The PSO issued a body-worn camera manufactured by TASER Inc to every one of its Deputy Sheriffs on patrol in the county.

In 2016 the Pasco Sheriff's Office developed a new hashtag called the "#9PMROUTINE" to remind people to lock their doors. This hashtag ended up being very successful for the sheriff's office as they saw thefts from vehicles drop by about 35% in just a few months. The hashtag became so popular that the sheriff's office copyrighted the hashtag. Over 100 different sheriff and police departments adopted the hashtag. The Sheriff's office said it copyrighted the hashtag so that it "doesn't get used for bad."

In 2020 the Tampa Bay Times reported on the PSO's predictive policing program, accusing it of monitoring and harassing families in the county, and reporting that at least one in ten people targeted by the program were underaged. A former deputy described the program as "mak[ing the targets] lives miserable until they move or sue." The program had been Nocco's signature initiatives since taking office in 2011. In November 2020, the paper reported on the ways that the office used Pasco County Schools district data, students grades, and students abuse history to predict "future criminal behavior". A data-sharing agreement had been in place between the sheriff's office and the school district for twenty years, and there were 420 children on their list. Law enforcement experts questioned the sheriff's justification for going through thousands of students education and child-welfare records, calling the program "highly unusual" and that it "stretched the limits of the law". The PSO program has been subject to widespread criticism from civil rights experts and legal experts. In the opinion of American University law professor Andrew Ferguson, "They basically built this system as a justification to chase the bad kids out of town, to monitor them in over-aggressive ways with no intention to help them but to make their lives so miserable that they would leave."

In 2021, the Pasco County Sheriff's Office was sued by a family that alleged harassment against them after the PSO identified the son in the family as a likely future criminal using his school district data, and the police proceeded to interact frequently with the family. This case was settled in December 2024.

== TV appearances ==
In 2015 the TV show Cops filmed with the Pasco County Sheriff's Office for eight weeks. In late 2017 the Pasco County Sheriff's Office signed a deal with A&E Network to take part in their new TV show Live PD. Their final night on Live PD was March 9, 2019.
