= Ed Hooper (politician) =

American politician

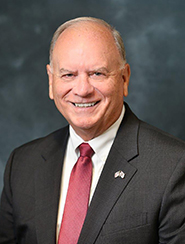

Member of the Florida Senate
- In office November 6, 2018 – November 3, 2026
- Preceded by: Jack Latvala
- Succeeded by: Chris Nocco
- Constituency: 16th district (2018–2022); 21st district (2022–2026)

Member of the Florida House of Representatives
- In office November 7, 2006 – November 4, 2014
- Preceded by: Kim Berfield
- Succeeded by: Chris Latvala
- Constituency: 50th district (2006–2012); 67th district (2012–2014)

Personal details
- Born: August 5, 1947 (age 79) Statesville, North Carolina, U.S.
- Party: Republican
- Education: St. Petersburg College
- Profession: Fire lieutenant

Ed Hooper (born August 5, 1947) is a former Republican member of the Florida Senate, representing the 21st District, which includes Clearwater and Largo in northern Pinellas County and western Pasco County.

== History ==
Hooper was born in Statesville, North Carolina, and moved to the state of Florida in 1972, where he attended St. Petersburg College, studying fire science and emergency medicine studies. He worked for twenty four years as a firefighter in Clearwater. In 1996, Hooper was elected to the Clearwater City Commission, defeating incumbent City Commissioner Sue Berfield in the process. When incumbent State Representative John Morroni was unable to seek another term in the legislature in 2000, Hooper ran to succeed him in the 50th District, which was based in northern Pinellas County and faced Kim Berfield, the daughter of Sue Berfield, in the Republican primary. Berfield attacked Hooper for "allowing 'bungled public projects' like the accident-prone Clearwater Beach roundabout" and for being a "union boss." Berfield ended up defeating Hooper with 56% of the vote.

== Florida House of Representatives ==
When Berfield, who had defeated him previously, opted to run for the Florida Senate in 2006 rather than seek re-election, Hooper ran to succeed her, campaigning on a platform of reforming homeowners' insurance. He defeated Nancy Riley in the primary with 58% of the vote and advanced to the general election, where he defeated Democratic nominee Candi Jovan with 55% of the vote. He was re-elected in 2008 without opposition, and in 2010, faced social worker and Democratic nominee Shelly Leonard, whom he outraised ninety-to-one and who attacked him over oil drilling off the coast of Florida, which he said he voted against, and for voting for a budget that funded "the infamous $48 million 'Taj Mahal' court of appeals building," which she called a "Hooper blooper." Hooper ended up defeating her comfortably, winning 60% of the vote to Leonard's 40%.

In 2012, when the legislative districts were redrawn, Hooper was moved to the 67th District, which included most of the territory that he had previously represented in northern Pinellas County in the 50th District. He faced Christopher Shepard in the Republican primary, but defeated him in a landslide with 69% of the vote. In the general election, Hooper faced Democratic nominee and restaurateur Ben Farrell, and he was endorsed by the Tampa Bay Times, which praised him as "one of the more practical Republicans" in the legislature for opposing "oil drilling in state waters, the expansion of tuition vouchers and casino gambling." He narrowly defeated Farrell to win his final term in the legislature with 53% of the vote.

== Pinellas County Commission ==
Following election to his final term in the legislature, Hooper, who is term-limited, announced that he would run against Pinellas County Commissioner Norm Roche. He criticized Roche for voting against restoring fluoridation to the county's water supply, noting, "It's not necessarily about what you like, or you don't like. You're there to represent the majority. I'm clearly a supporter of fluoride."

== Florida Senate ==
In 2018, Hooper announced he was seeking the Republican Nomination for the District 16 Seat of the Florida Senate, vacated by State Senator Jack Latvala. The primary election was scheduled for August 28, 2018. Hooper defeated Democratic nominee Amanda Hickman Murphy 52-48% on the general election.

In 2021, Hooper sponsored legislation to overturn the results of a Key West ballot initiative to restrict the size of ships and the number of passengers who can visit the city daily.

Hooper resigned from the Florida Senate in November 2026.

Florida House of Representatives
Preceded by Kim Berfield	Member of the Florida House of Representatives from the 50th district 2006–2012	Succeeded by Tom Goodson
Preceded by Greg Steube	Member of the Florida House of Representatives from the 67th district 2012–2014	Succeeded by Chris Latvala
Florida Senate
Preceded by Jack Latvala	Member of the Florida Senate from the 16th district 2018–2026	Succeeded by Chris Nocco
