= John Ducker (disambiguation) =

John Ducker (1932–2005) was an Australian labour leader and politician.

John Ducker can also refer to:

- John L. Ducker (1922–2014), American politician
- John Ducker (cricketer) (born 1934), Australian cricketeer
- John Leeson (born John Ducker, 1943–2026), English actor
