= Latvala =

Latvala is a Finnish surname. Notable people with the surname include:

- Chris Latvala (born 1981), American politician, member of the Florida House of Representatives
- Dick Latvala (1943–1999), American tape archivist
- Hanna-Maari Latvala (born 1987), Finnish sprinter
- Jack Latvala (born 1951), American politician, member of the Florida Senate
- Jan Latvala (born 1972), Finnish professional ice hockey defenceman
- Jari-Matti Latvala (born 1985), Finnish rally driver
- Matti Latvala (1868–1964), Finnish farmer and politician, member of the Parliament of Finland 1909–1917 and 1919–1922
- Mikko Latvala (born 1980), Finnish pole vaulter
- Roope Latvala (born 1970), Finnish guitarist
- Sini Latvala (born 1980), Finnish hammer thrower
