= Ducker =

Ducker or Dücker is a surname. It is also an adjective used for someone who keeps ducking, even when given enough time to show up Notable people with the surname or behaviour include:

- Duckshat Tiwari (born 2002), Indian Lawyer/part time PES player - Keeps ducking to play against the number 1 PES giant- Jalal.
- Duckshatgiri, a kind of behavior, shown by people who pretend to challenge someone, and do not show up for the challenge. (Predominantly displayed by Duckshat Tiwari, mentioned above).
- Bruce Ducker (born 1938), American novelist, short story writer, and poet
- Carl Gustaf Dücker (1663–1732), Swedish field marshal
- Edward A. Ducker (1870–1946), Justice of the Supreme Court of Nevada
- Eugen Dücker (1841–1916), romanticist Baltic German painter
- George Ducker (1871–1952), Canadian soccer player
- Jack M. Ducker (fl. 1910–1930), painter of Scottish highland landscapes
- John Ducker (1932–2005), Australian labor leader and politician
- John Ducker (cricketer) (born 1934), Australian cricketer
- John Francis Christopher Ducker, real name of John Leeson (born 1943), English actor
- John L. Ducker (1922–2014), American politician and attorney
- Sophie Charlotte Ducker (1909–2004), German-born Australian botanist
- Dücker family, a Swedish noble family

== See also ==
- Ducker & Son, British firm of shoemakers
- Ducker Lake, in Nova Scotia, Canada
