= Greg Steube =

American politician (born 1978)

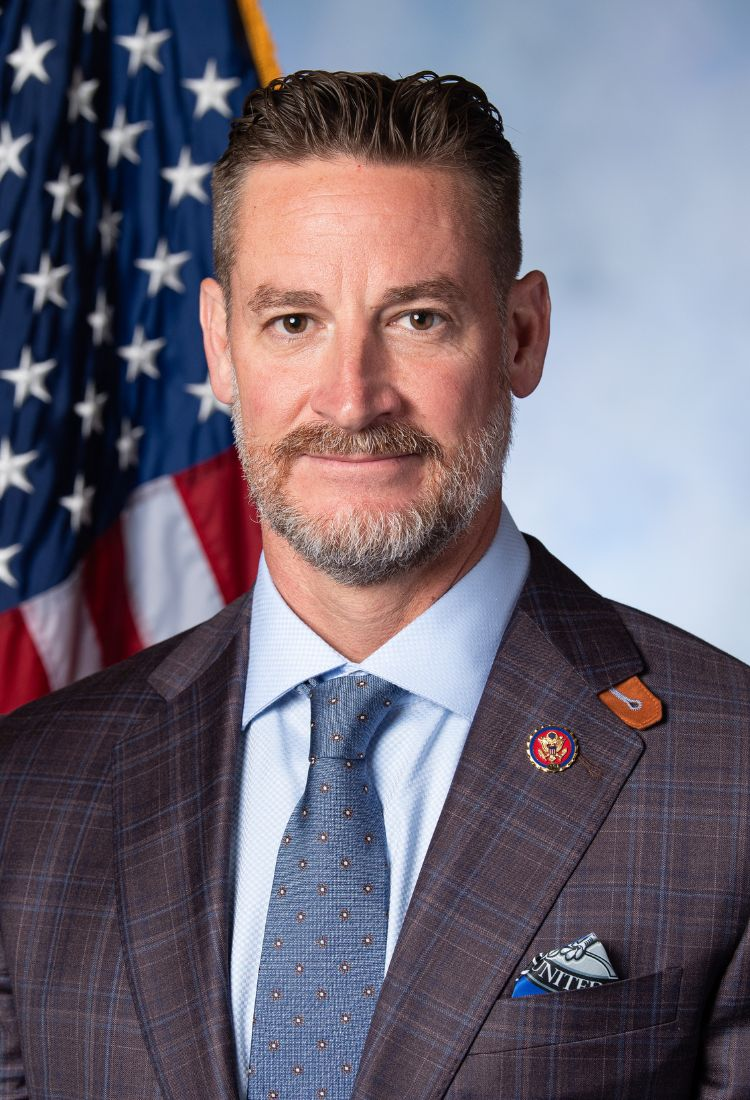
- Official portrait, 2022

Member of the U.S. House of Representatives from Florida's 17th district
- Incumbent
- Assumed office January 3, 2019
- Preceded by: Tom Rooney

Member of the Florida Senate from the 23rd district
- In office November 8, 2016 – November 6, 2018
- Preceded by: Garrett Richter
- Succeeded by: Joe Gruters

Member of the Florida House of Representatives
- In office November 2, 2010 – November 8, 2016
- Preceded by: Ron Reagan
- Succeeded by: Ed Hooper
- Constituency: 67th district (2010–2012); 73rd district (2012–2016)

Personal details
- Born: William Gregory Steube; May 19, 1978 (age 48) Bradenton, Florida, U.S.
- Party: Republican
- Spouse: Jennifer Steube
- Children: 1
- Education: University of Florida (BS, JD)
- Website: House website Campaign website

Military service
- Branch/service: United States Army
- Years of service: 2004–2008
- Rank: Captain
- Unit: Army Judge Advocate General's Corps
- Battles/wars: Iraq War
- Steube's voice Steube supporting the Taxpayer Notification and Privacy Act. Recorded April 27, 2026

William Gregory Steube (/ˈstuːbiː/ STOO-bee; born May 19, 1978) is an American politician serving as the U.S. representative for Florida's 17th congressional district since 2019. His district is based in Sarasota. A member of the Republican Party, Steube served three terms in the Florida House of Representatives, representing the Sarasota-Manatee area from 2010 to 2016, as well as two years in the Florida Senate until 2018, representing Sarasota County and the western part of Charlotte County.

Steube is a supporter of President Donald Trump. In December 2020, Steube was one of 126 Republican members of the House of Representatives to sign an amicus brief in support of Texas v. Pennsylvania, a lawsuit filed at the United States Supreme Court contesting the results of the 2020 presidential election, in which Joe Biden defeated incumbent Donald Trump.

== Early life ==
Steube was born on May 19, 1978, in Bradenton to Brad Steube, who served as Sheriff of Manatee County. He graduated from Southeast High School in 1996. He earned a degree in Animal Science from the University of Florida in 2000 and then a Juris Doctor from the University of Florida Fredric G. Levin College of Law in 2003. At UF, Steube was a brother of Alpha Gamma Rho fraternity. After graduation, Steube joined the United States Army and attended the JAG School at the University of Virginia and entered the U.S. Army JAG Corps. He served as Captain from 2004 to 2008 and deployed to Iraq in support of Operation Iraqi Freedom.

== Florida House of Representatives ==
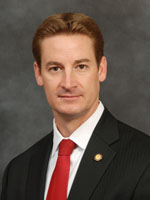
Steube in 2011

When state representative Ron Reagan was unable to seek reelection in 2010 due to term limits, Steube ran to succeed him in the 67th District, based in southern Hillsborough County, eastern Manatee County, and northern Sarasota County, stretching from Apollo Beach to Fruitville. He received an endorsement from U.S. representative Vern Buchanan, who called Steube "extremely knowledgeable of the district and the district's issues." In the Republican primary, he defeated Jeremiah J. Guccione and Robert McCann with 53% of the vote to Guccione's 28% and McCann's 19%. He advanced to the general election, where he faced Democratic nominee Z. J. Hafeez and independent candidate John M. Studebaker. Both candidates opposed offshore oil drilling off the coast of the state, supported solar energy, and favored medical tort law reform "that they [felt would] increase access to health care for Floridians." Steube won 68% of the vote to Hafeez's 27% and Studebaker's 5%.

After the reconfiguration of state legislative districts in 2012, Steube's district was renumbered the 73rd district. The district was pushed further into Sarasota County while losing its share of Hillsborough County. Steube won his party's nomination unopposed, and moved on to the general election, facing only Bob McCann, who had previously run against Steube in the 2010 Republican primary, but was running as an independent. Steube and McCann disagreed over whether the state should expand Medicaid under the Patient Protection and Affordable Care Act, with Steube opposed and McCann in favor, and over whether the state should fund charter schools, with Steube in favor and McCann opposed. Steube was endorsed by the Bradenton Herald, which praised him for his "strong first term and his qualifications", specifically calling him out for working to put two constitutional amendments on the ballot that provide tax exemptions to the spouses of deceased military veterans and property tax relief to low-income seniors. Steube defeated McCann with 74% of the vote. In 2014, Steube was reelected to his third term in the legislature without opposition.

== Florida Senate ==
In 2016, Steube ran for the Florida Senate seat vacated by Nancy Detert in District 23, who was term limited. He defeated four other candidates in the Republican primary, receiving 31% of the vote, and won the general election against Democrat Frank Alcock, 59 to 41%.

== U.S. House of Representatives ==
=== Elections ===
==== 2018 ====
Steube ran for the Republican nomination for Florida's 17th Congressional District in 2018, a seat that was being vacated by Tom Rooney, who declined to seek reelection. He won the August 28 Republican primary. In the November 6 general election, he defeated Democrat Allen Ellison, who replaced the original Democratic nominee, April Freeman, after she died unexpectedly in September.

==== 2020 ====
Steube was reelected in 2020 with 64.6% of the vote, defeating Democrat Allen Ellison.

==== 2022 ====
For his first two terms, Steube represented a large swath of south-central Florida, from the outer suburbs of Sarasota and Fort Myers through the Everglades to the shores of Lake Okeechobee. However, after the 2020 census, his district was made significantly more compact, picking up all of Sarasota while losing most of its inland territory to the 18th district. The new 19th was no less Republican than its predecessor, and Steube easily won a third term.

=== Tenure ===
Steube supports repealing the Affordable Care Act. During the COVID-19 pandemic, Steube argued that the "deep state" at the FDA was preventing the use of hydroxychloroquine, an antimalarial drug, to treat COVID-19. Medical experts note that hydroxychloroquine neither treats nor prevents infection by COVID-19.

In December 2020, Steube was one of 126 Republican members of the House of Representatives to sign an amicus brief in support of Texas v. Pennsylvania, a lawsuit filed at the United States Supreme Court contesting the results of the 2020 presidential election, in which Joe Biden defeated incumbent Donald Trump. The Supreme Court declined to hear the case on the basis that Texas lacked standing under Article III of the Constitution to challenge the results of an election held by another state.

On January 6–7, 2021, Steube voted not to certify the election of Joe Biden as president. On January 13, Steube voted against the second impeachment of Donald Trump.

In October 2020 and again in January 2021, Steube introduced a bill to bar technology platforms from suspending conservative accounts.

In late February 2021, Steube and a dozen other Republican House Members skipped votes and enlisted others to vote for them, citing the ongoing COVID-19 pandemic, but he and the other members were actually attending the Conservative Political Action Conference. In response, the Campaign for Accountability, an ethics watchdog group, filed a complaint with the House Committee on Ethics and requested an investigation into Steube and the other lawmakers; there is no evidence the Ethics Committee investigated any House Member for these false statements or abuse of proxy voting.

In June 2021, Steube was among 21 House Republicans who voted against a resolution to give the Congressional Gold Medal to police officers who defended the U.S. Capitol on January 6.

In June 2021, Steube was one of 49 House Republicans to vote to repeal the AUMF against Iraq.

In February 2023, Steube introduced H.R. 734: Protection of Women and Girls in Sports Act of 2023. The bill would forbid athletes who were assigned male at birth from participating in federally funded sports programs designated for women and girls, specifically K-12 school sports and collegiate athletic teams. The bill has been widely criticized as an attempt to exclude and target transgender athletes. The bill passed in the House, but was not voted on in the Senate.

In May 2023, Steube co-sponsored resolutions by Marjorie Taylor Greene to impeach Attorney General Merrick Garland and FBI Director Christopher Wray.

Steube was among the 71 Republicans who voted against final passage of the Fiscal Responsibility Act of 2023 in the House.

In 2023, Steube was among 98 Republicans to vote for a ban on cluster munitions to Ukraine. The same year, Steube voted for a moratorium on aid to Ukraine.

In May 2024, Steube accomplished the act of stewarding a complete discharge petition, corralling 29 Republican votes with 189 Democrats to bring a bill on disaster relief to the floor.

In June 2024, Steube introduced legislation to name the exclusive economic zone of the United States after Donald Trump as the "Donald John Trump Exclusive Economic Zone of the United States." Congress took no action on the bill.

In January 2025, Steube introduced H.R. 28: Protection of Women and Girls in Sports Act of 2025. This is the same bill that was introduced as H.R. 734: Protection of Women and Girls in Sports Act of 2023. The 2025 bill passed the House in a 218–206 vote, but it did not pass in the Senate, where it was halted by a vote of 51–45 when 60 votes are needed to pass.

In May 2025, Steube introduced a bill to rename the Washington Metropolitan Area Transit Authority, WMATA, to mimic MAGA, proposing "Washington Metropolitan Authority for Greater Access." Steube claimed his bill would "demand accountability by conditioning federal funding on reforms that signal a cultural shift away from bureaucratic stagnation toward public-facing excellence and patriotism." The bill proposed no substantive changes, limiting its "accountability" to the name change. In 2024, WMATA received $178.5 million from the District of Columbia, $167 million from Maryland, and $154.5 million from Virginia.

=== Committee assignments ===
For the 118th Congress:

- Committee on Ways and Means
  - Subcommittee on Oversight
  - Subcommittee on Social Security
  - Subcommittee on Trade
- Select Subcommittee on the Weaponization of the Federal Government

=== Caucus memberships ===
- Congressional Taiwan Caucus
- Congressional Western Caucus
- Republican Study Committee

== Personal life ==
Steube and his wife, Jennifer, have one son.

On January 18, 2023, Steube fell approximately 25 feet (7.6 m) off a ladder while chainsawing tree limbs at his home in Sarasota, Florida. An Amazon delivery driver found Steube and called 911; Steube later invited the driver as his guest to the 2023 State of the Union. Steube was admitted to Sarasota Memorial Hospital with multiple injuries, including a punctured lung, fractured pelvis, and torn neck ligaments. He was released from the hospital on January 21. Steube later told Politico that Donald Trump was the first person to contact him while he was in the ICU.

Steube is a Methodist.

== Electoral history ==
Six weeks before the 2018 election, Steube's Democratic opponent, 54-year-old April Freeman, was found dead. The cause of death was a heart attack. A replacement, Allen Ellison, was appointed, but ballots were already printed. Rather than reprint, Ellison's name was left off of the ballot.

Republican primary results, 2018
Party	Candidate	Votes	%
Republican	Greg Steube	48,963	62.4
Republican	Bill Akins	15,133	19.3
Republican	Julio Gonzalez	14,402	18.3
Total votes		78,498	100.0

Florida's 17th congressional district, 2018
Party	Candidate	Votes	%
Republican	Greg Steube	193,326	62.3
Democratic	Allen Ellison	117,194	37.7
Total votes		310,520	100.0
Republican hold			

Florida's 17th congressional district, 2020
Party	Candidate	Votes	%
Republican	Greg Steube (incumbent)	266,514	64.6
Democratic	Allen Ellison	140,487	34.1
Independent	Theodore Murray	5,396	1.3
Total votes		412,397	100.0
Republican hold			

Florida's 17th congressional district, 2022
Party	Candidate	Votes	%
Republican	Greg Steube (incumbent)	222,483	63.8
Democratic	Andrea Kale	123,798	35.5
Independent	Theodore Murray	2,225	0.6
Total votes		348,506	100.0
Republican hold			

Florida's 17th congressional district, 2024
Party	Candidate	Votes	%
Republican	Greg Steube (incumbent)	291,347	63.90
Democratic	Manny Lopez	164,566	36.10
Write-in	Ralph Hartman	8	0.00
Total votes		455,921	100.00
Republican hold			

U.S. House of Representatives
Preceded by Tom Rooney	Member of the U.S. House of Representatives from Florida's 17th congressional district 2019–present	Incumbent
U.S. order of precedence (ceremonial)
Preceded by Bryan Steil	United States representatives by seniority 228th	Succeeded by Haley Stevens
