= Jerry Rehm =

American politician

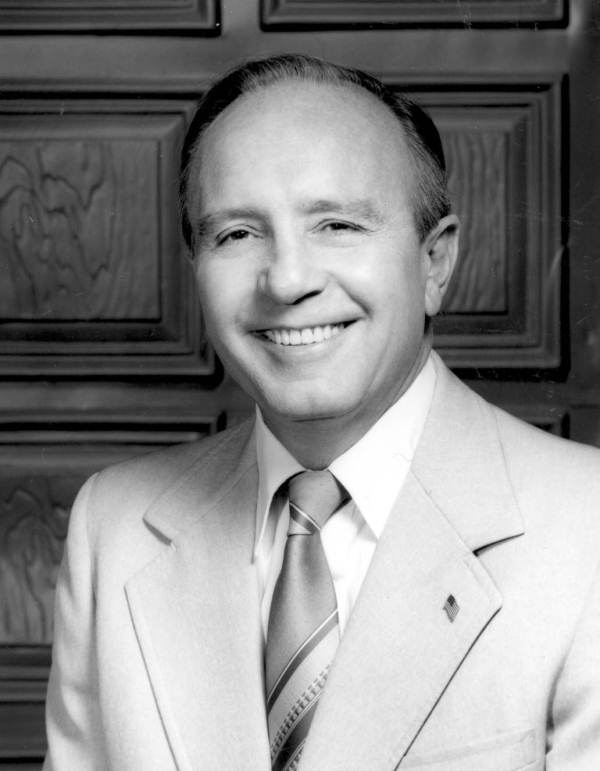

Member of the Florida House of Representatives from the 54th district
- In office November 4, 1986 – November 6, 1990
- Preceded by: Byron Combee
- Succeeded by: Patricia Muscarella

Member of the Florida Senate from the 19th district
- In office November 4, 1980 – November 6, 1984
- Preceded by: Don Chamberlin
- Succeeded by: Curt Kiser

Personal details
- Born: March 10, 1927 West Palm Beach, Florida
- Died: March 10, 2017 (aged 90) Dunedin, Florida
- Party: Republican
- Occupation: businessman

Gerald S. Rehm (March 10, 1927 – March 10, 2017) was an American politician in the state of Florida.

He was a businessman and former mayor of Dunedin, Florida. He served in the Florida House of Representatives for the 51st district from 1986 to 1990, as a Republican. Rehm also served in the Florida Senate from 1981 to 1984.
