= Muscarella =

Muscarella may refer to:

- Nicholas James (actor) (born Nicholas James Muscarella, active from 2006), American actor
- Oscar White Muscarella (born 1931), American archaeologist
- Patricia Muscarella (born 1952), American politician and judge from Florida
- Muscarella, a synonym of Andreettaea, a genus of orchids

== See also ==
- Muscarelle Museum of Art, Virginia
