= Combee =

Combee may refer to:

- Combee (Pokémon), a Pokémon species
- Byron Combee (born 1947), American politician
- Neil Combee (born 1959), American politician
- Combee Settlement, Florida, United States
- Combee: Harriet Tubman, the Combahee River Raid, and Black Freedom During the Civil War, a 2024 book
