= Don Chamberlin =

American politician (1935–2024)

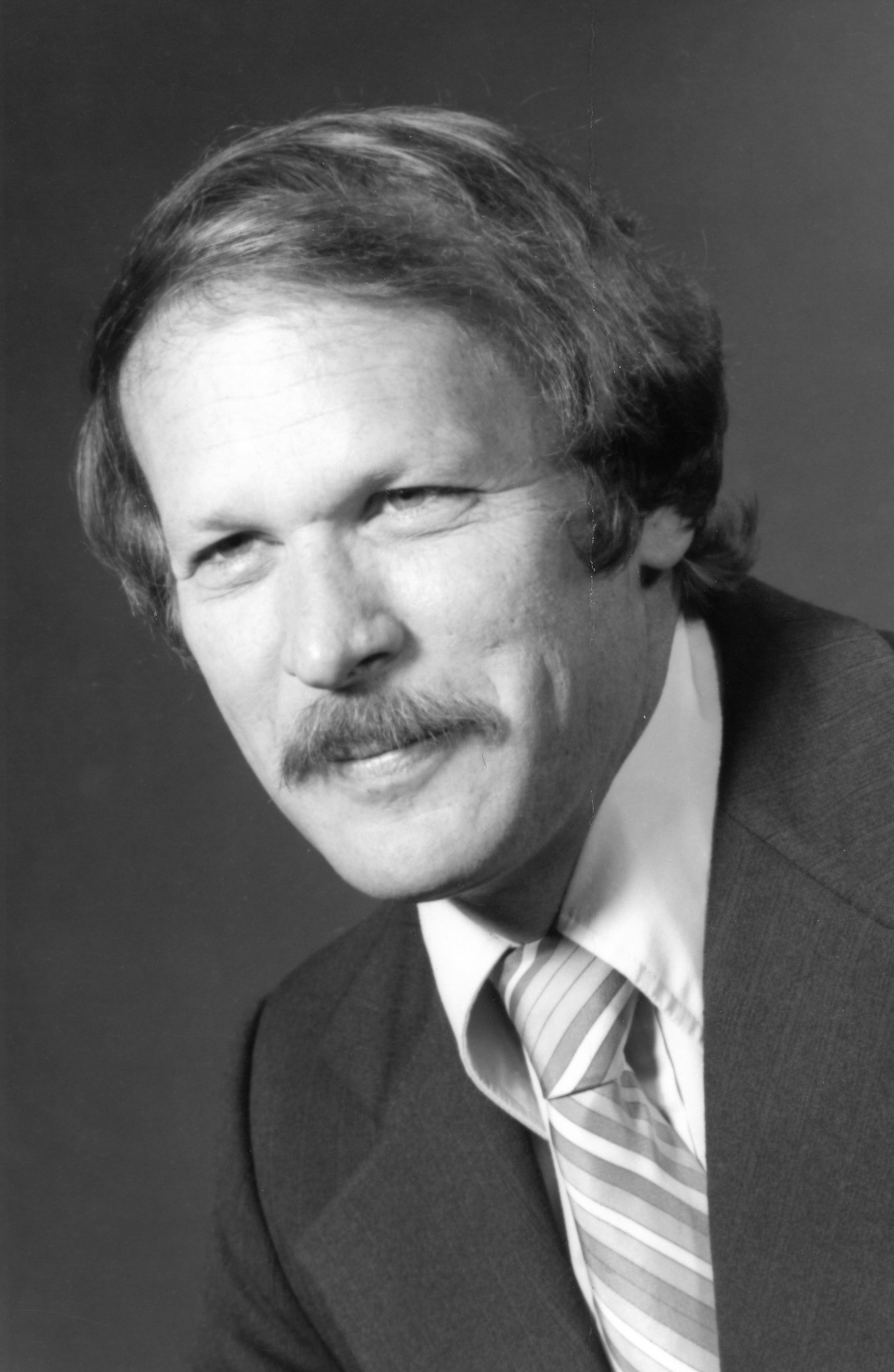

Member of the Florida Senate from the 19th district
- In office November 2, 1976 – November 4, 1980
- Preceded by: Richard Deeb
- Succeeded by: Jerry Rehm

Personal details
- Born: December 13, 1935 Dunedin, Florida
- Died: September 14, 2024 (aged 88) Oldsmar, Florida
- Party: Democratic
- Spouse: Therese "Terry" McBride (m. 1961; div. 1995)
- Children: 2
- Education: St. Petersburg Junior College; Florida State University (B.A., M.A.)
- Occupation: Teacher

Donald Leslie Chamberlin (December 13, 1935 – September 14, 2024) was a Democratic politician from Florida who served as a member of the Florida Senate from the 19th district from 1976 to 1980.

== Early life ==
Chamberlin was born in Dunedin, Florida, in 1935. He attended St. Petersburg Junior College and graduated from Florida State University with his bachelor's degree in 1959 and master's degree in 1968. Chamberlin was a teacher in Pinellas County Schools, and served as the president of the Pinellas Classroom Teachers Association.

== Florida Senate ==
In 1976, Chamberlin ran for the Florida Senate from the 19th district, challenging incumbent Republican State Senator Richard Deeb for re-election. He attacked Deeb as a "poor leader" and a "fear-monger," and criticized him for pushing "publicity-stunt" legislation. Chamberlin narrowly defeated Deeb, winning 51 percent of the vote to his 49 percent.

Chamberlin ran for re-election in 1980, and was challenged by Republican Jerry Rehm, the former mayor of Dunedin. Rehm argued that Chamberlin was out of step with the district, and unseated him by a thin margin, receiving 52 percent of the vote to his 48 percent.

== Death ==
Chamberlin died September 14, 2024.
