= Berfield =

Berfield is a surname. Notable people with the surname include:

- Justin Berfield (born 1986), American writer, producer, and actor
- Kim Berfield (born 1971), American politician
