= Robert Shadley =

Robert Shadley may refer to:

- Robert D. Shadley (born 1942), United States Army general
- Robert H. Shadley (1926–2022), American politician in the Florida House of Representatives
