= 2006 Orange County, Florida mayoral election =

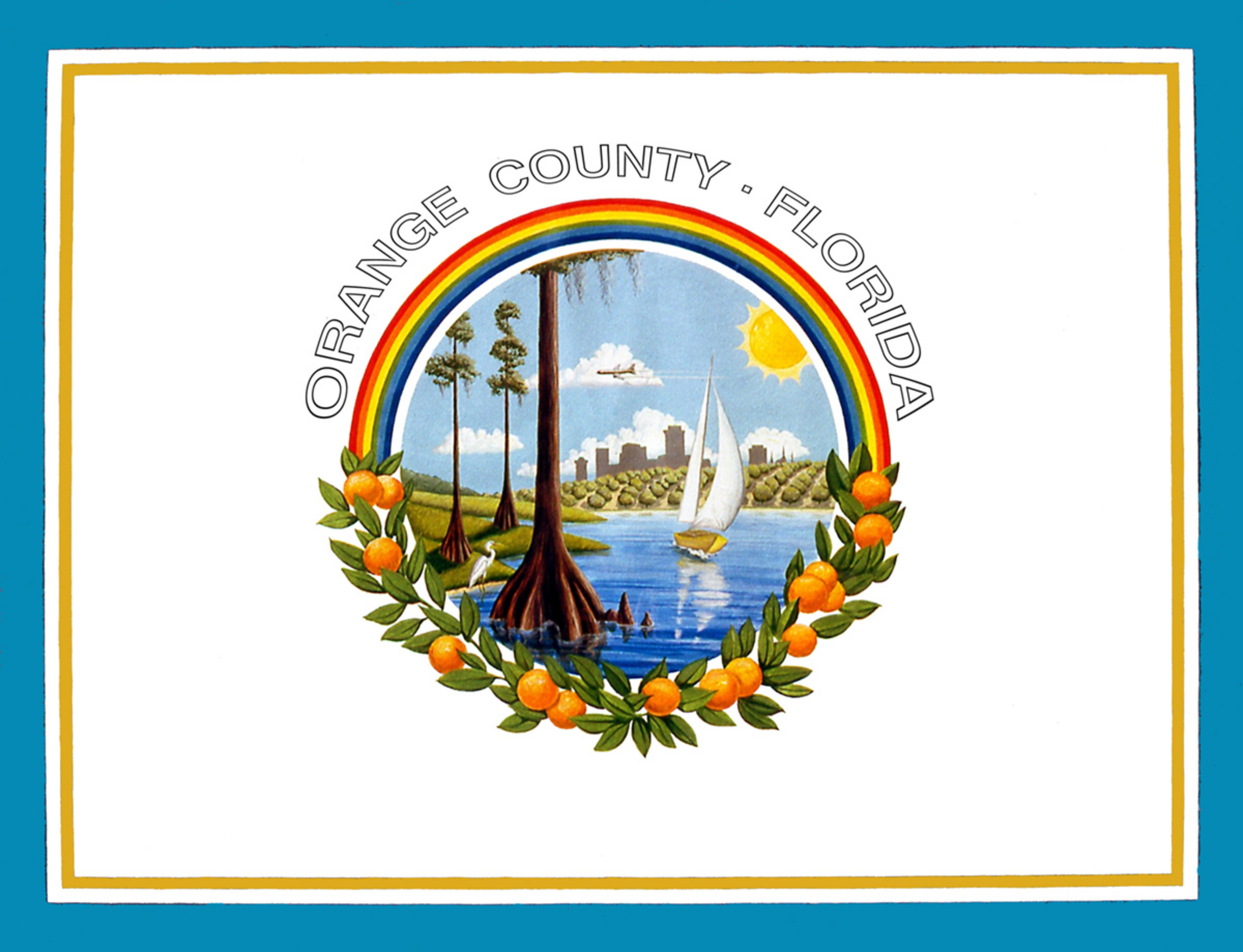
- September 5, 2006
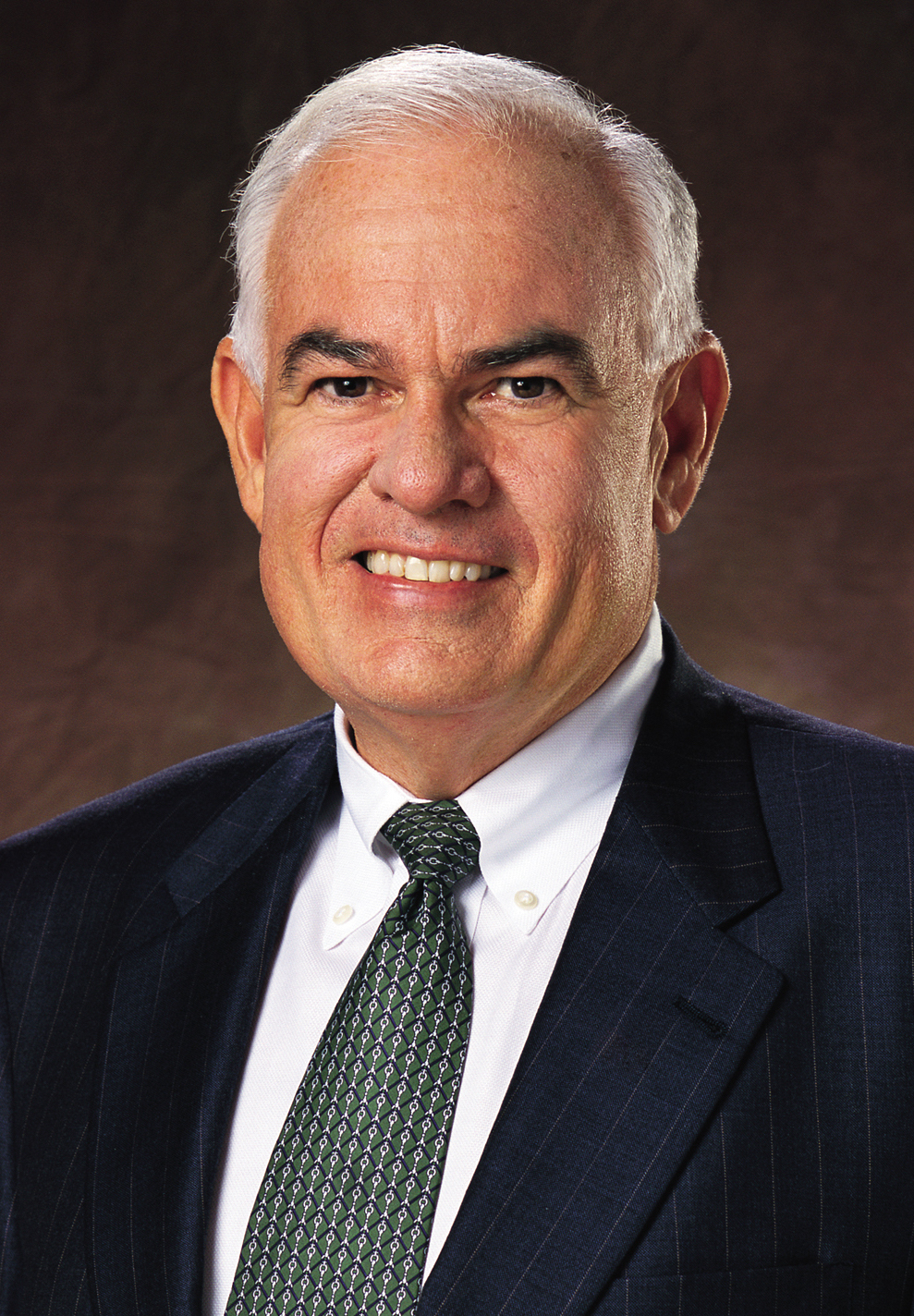

Candidate	Rich Crotty	Sally Baptiste
Party	Nonpartisan	Nonpartisan
Popular vote	59,896	25,313
Percentage	70.02%	29.59%
Mayor before election
Rich Crotty
Nonpartisan
Elected mayor
Rich Crotty
Nonpartisan

The 2006 Orange County, Florida, mayoral election took place on September 5, 2006. Incumbent Mayor Rich Crotty, who was first appointed in 2001 and elected in 2002, ran for re-election to a second full term. Following a 2004 amendment to the county charter that changed the name of the position, this was the first election for "Mayor." Crotty did not face a serious challenger, and was opposed by anti-tax activist Sally Baptiste, a former member of the county Soil and Water Conservation District Board. Though the race was formally nonpartisan, both Baptise and Crotty were Republicans. Crotty ultimately defeated Baptiste in a landslide, winning 70 percent of the vote.

== Primary election ==
=== Candidates ===
- Rich Crotty, incumbent Mayor (Republican)
- Sally Baptiste, former member of the Orange County Soil and Water Conservation District Board, anti-tax activist (Republican)

==== Dropped out ====
- Jonathan Cook, anti-commuter rail activist

==== Declined ====
- Ted Edwards, Orange County Commissioner
- Teresa Jacobs, Orange County Commissioner
- Bob Sindler, Orange County Commissioner

=== Results ===
2006 Orange County, Florida, mayoral election
Party	Candidate	Votes	%
Nonpartisan	Rich Crotty (inc.)	59,896	70.02%
Nonpartisan	Sally Baptiste	25,313	29.59%
Write-in		332	0.39%
Total votes		85,541	100.00%
