= Robert H. Shadley =

American politician (1926–2022)

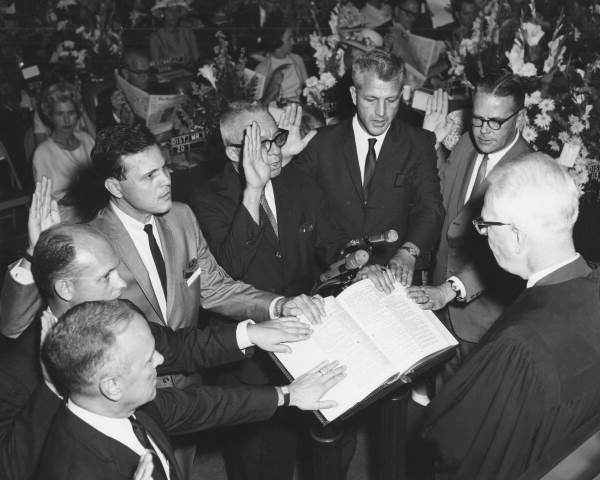
- Shadley with Bill Gorman, Bill Gillespie, Henry W. Land, David Lindsey, John L. Ducker and B. Campbell Thornal, 1967

Member of the Florida House of Representatives from the 40th district
- In office 1967–1968
- Preceded by: District established
- Succeeded by: Bill Fulford

Personal details
- Born: April 7, 1926 Akron, Ohio, U.S.
- Died: August 26, 2022 (aged 96) Maitland, Florida, U.S.
- Party: Republican
- Education: Pennsylvania State University
- Occupation: executive

Robert Hale Shadley (April 7, 1926 – August 26, 2022) was an American politician in the state of Florida who served in the Florida House of Representatives from 1967 to 1968, representing the 40th district. Shadley died in Maitland, Florida on August 26, 2022, at the age of 96.
