= Düker =

Düker is a surname. Notable people with the surname include:

- Bernd Düker (born 1992), German footballer
- Heinrich Düker (1898–1986), German psychologist, politician, and academic
- Julius Düker (born 1996), German footballer

== See also ==
- Ducker
