= Donald Chamberlin (disambiguation) =

Donald or Don Jenkins may refer to:

- Donald D. Chamberlin (born 1944), American computer scientist
- Don Chamberlin (1935–2024), American politician from Florida
