= Jack C. Inman =

American politician

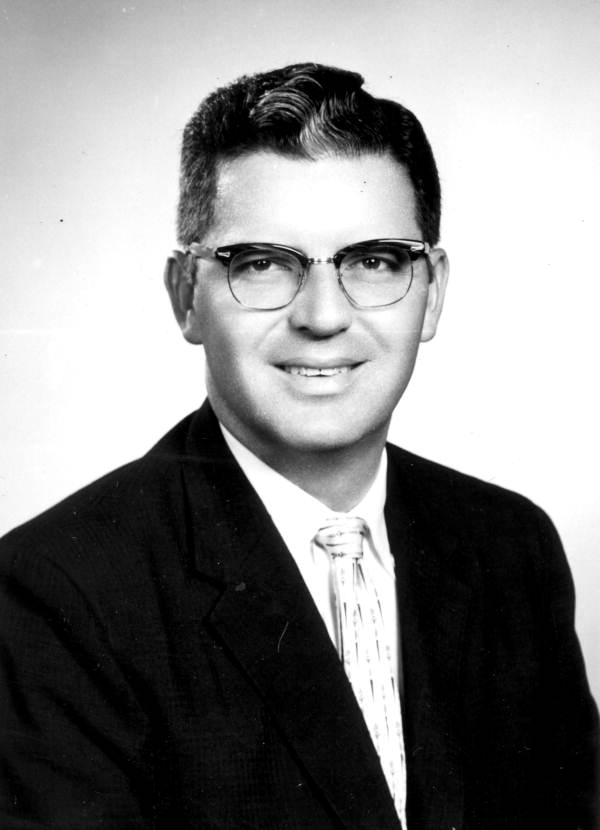
- Inman in 1959

Member of the Florida House of Representatives from Orange County
- In office September 3, 1957 – 1961 Serving with Beth Johnson
- Preceded by: Henry W. Land; John A. Sutton
- Succeeded by: John L. Ducker

Personal details
- Born: Jack Clay Inman; January 26, 1925 DeLand, Florida, U.S.
- Died: November 24, 2015 (aged 90)
- Party: Democratic
- Children: 4
- Education: Stetson University; Stetson University College of Law

Jack Clay Inman (January 26, 1925 – November 24, 2015) was an American politician. He served as a Democratic member of the Florida House of Representatives.

Born in DeLand, Florida, the son of Clare Higley and Frank Lindon Inman, Inman attended at DeLand High School. He went on to attend Stetson University and the Stetson University College of Law, He then served in the United States Navy during World War II, where he was a communications officer.

In 1957, Inman was elected to the Florida House of Representatives, succeeding Henry W. Land. In 1961, he was succeeded by John L. Ducker. Inman was later an insurance commissioner in Florida, and owned Corporate Group Service.

Inman died in November 2015 at the age of 90.
