= Florida's 58th House of Representatives district =

Florida district

Florida's 58th State House of Representatives district
Representative
Kim Berfield; R–Clearwater

Florida's 58th House of Representatives district elects one member of the Florida House of Representatives. It covers parts of Pinellas County.

== Members ==
- Kim Berfield (since 2022)
