= Octavio Hernandez (politician) =

Octavio Hernandez is a teacher and state legislator in the Florida House of Representatives. A Democrat, he was elected in 2026. He defeated incumbent Hilary Holley, a Republican, despite a lopsided fundraising disadvantage.

== Personal life ==
Hernandez was born in Mexico City, and in 2015 received a degree from the University of Central Florida.

He lives in Davenport, Florida in Polk County, Florida.
