= Kim Berfield =

American politician (born 1971)

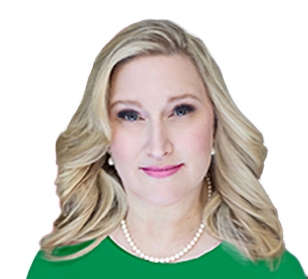

Member of the Florida House of Representatives
- Incumbent
- Assumed office November 8, 2022
- Preceded by: Chris Latvala
- Constituency: 58th district
- In office November 21, 2000 – November 21, 2006
- Preceded by: John Morroni
- Succeeded by: Ed Hooper
- Constituency: 50th district

Personal details
- Born: May 29, 1971 (age 55) Houston, Texas, U.S.
- Party: Republican
- Education: St. Petersburg Junior College (AA); University of Central Florida (BA); Northwestern University (MBA)

Kim Berfield (born May 29, 1971) is an American politician serving as a Republican member of the Florida House of Representatives for the 58th district. She was elected in 2022. She represented the 50th district from 2000 to 2006. She was re-elected in 2026.

== History ==
Born in Houston, Texas, her mother and father were both at one time Clearwater City Commissioners. Berfield attended the University of Central Florida and later received an MBA at Northwestern University.

Between stints as a State Representative, she served as a deputy secretary for the Florida Department of Health, and afterwards was a business analyst and lobbyist for All Children's Hospital.

== Florida House of Representatives ==
In 2000, she ran for and was elected to the Florida House of Representatives representing the 50th district. She did not file for re-election after three terms and instead ran for the Florida Senate in 2006, losing to Charlie Justice. In June 2021, she announced that she was running for the Florida House of Representatives in 2022.

She was elected to the State House again in November 2022. In 2022, she ran for an open seat previously held by Chris Latvala, defeating Jason Holloway in the Republican primary with 53.5% of the vote, and then defeating Democrat Bernie Fensterwald with 60.3% of the vote in the general election.

Florida House of Representatives
Preceded by John Morroni	Member of the Florida House of Representatives from the 50th district 2000–2006	Succeeded by Ed Hooper
