= Cecil L. Bothwell Jr. =

American politician

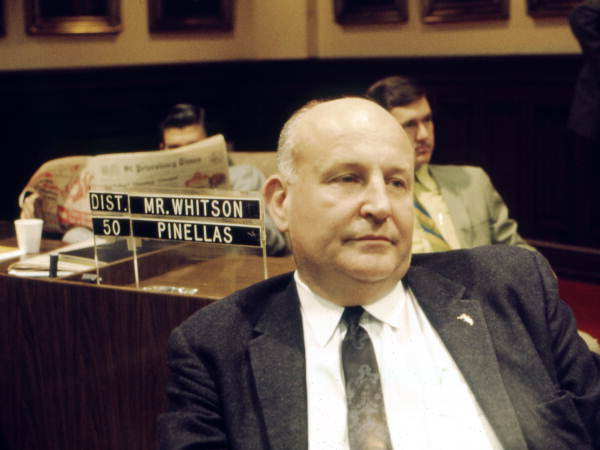
- Bothwell in 1970

Member of the Florida House of Representatives from the 39th district
- In office 1968–1970
- Preceded by: John L. Ducker
- Succeeded by: Harvey H. Matthews

Personal details
- Born: October 12, 1916 East St. Louis, Illinois, U.S.
- Died: March 5, 1998 (aged 81)
- Party: Republican
- Education: University of Chicago; Northwestern University

Cecil L. Bothwell Jr. (October 12, 1916 – March 5, 1998) was an American politician. He served as a Republican member for the 39th district of the Florida House of Representatives.

== Life and career ==
Bothwell was born in East St. Louis, Illinois. He attended the University of Chicago and Northwestern University.

In 1968, Bothwell was elected to represent the 39th district of the Florida House of Representatives, succeeding John L. Ducker. He served until 1970, when he was succeeded by Harvey H. Matthews.

Bothwell died on March 5, 1998, at the age of 81.
