= Florida's 19th Senate district =

American legislative district

Florida's 19th State Senate district
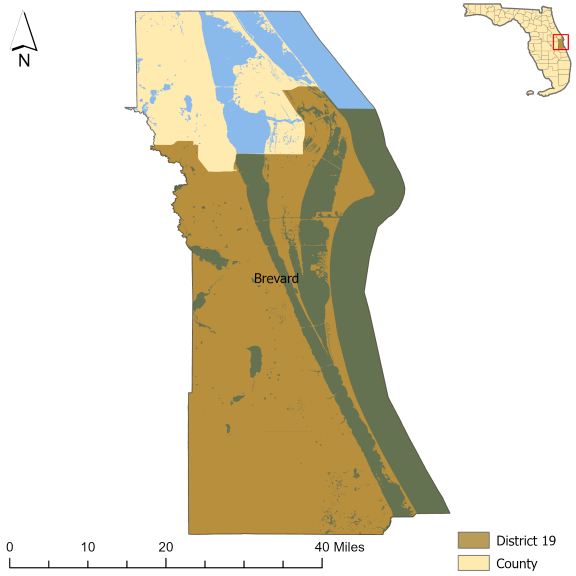
Senator
Debbie Mayfield; R–Melbourne
- Demographics: 71% White; 9% Black; 12% Hispanic; 2% Asian; 1% Other; 5% Multiracial
- Population (2023): 551,710

Florida's 19th Senate district elects one member of the Florida Senate. The district consists of most of Brevard County south of Titusville, in the U.S. state of Florida. The current senator is Republican Debbie Mayfield.

From 1962 to 1966, the district was represented by Beth Johnson, the first female state senator in Florida history.

The district contains the Kennedy Space Center; NASA's primary launch center.

== List of senators ==
Full list of senators from the 19th district (1845–2006).

Portrait	Name	Party	Years of service	Home city/state	Notes
	Walter W. Rose	Democratic	1932–1948	Orlando, Florida	
	J. B. Rodgers Jr.	Democratic	1948–1957	Milton, Florida	
	John A. Sutton		1958–1961	Orlando, Florida	
	Beth Johnson	Democratic	1962–1966	Butler, Pennsylvania	Consisted of Orange County
	Bill Young	Republican	1966–1970	Harmarville, Pennsylvania	Consisted of Pinellas County
	John T. Ware	Republican	1970–1972	Chattanooga, Tennessee	
	Richard Deeb	Republican	1972–1976	Tallahassee, Florida	Consisted of Pinellas County
	Don Chamberlin	Republican	1976–1980		
	Jerry Rehm	Republican	1980–1984	West Palm Beach, Florida	Consisted of Pinellas County
	Curt Kiser	Republican	1984–1994	Oskaloosa, Iowa	
	Jack Latvala	Republican	1994–2002	Oxford, Mississippi	Consisted of northern Pinellas and western Pasco counties
	Gary Siplin	Democratic	2002–2012	Orlando, Florida	Redistricted; Consisted of parts of Orange and Osceola counties
	Arthenia Joyner	Democratic	2012–2016	Lakeland, Florida	Redistricted from the 18th district; Consisted of parts of Hillsborough County and Pinellas counties
	Darryl Rouson	Democratic	2016–2022	New Orleans, Louisiana	Consisted of parts of Hillsborough County and Pinellas counties
	Debbie Mayfield	Republican	2022–2024	Pensacola, Florida	Redistricted from the 17th district; Consisted of most of Brevard County
	Randy Fine	Republican	2024–2025	Tucson, Arizona	Consisted of most of Brevard County
	Debbie Mayfield	Republican	2025–present	Pensacola, Florida	Consists of most of Brevard County

== Elections ==
=== 2020 ===
2020 Florida's 19th senate district election
Party	Candidate	Votes	%
Democratic	Darryl Rouson (incumbent)	174,343	68.7%
Independent	Christina Paylan	79,463	31.3%
Total votes		253,806	100%
Democratic hold			

=== 2022 ===
2022 Florida's 19th senate district election
Party	Candidate	Votes	%
Republican	Debbie Mayfield (incumbent)	Unopposed	
Total votes		—	—
Republican hold			

=== 2024 ===
2024 Florida's 19th senate district election
Party	Candidate	Votes	%
Republican	Randy Fine	184,731	59.36
Democratic	Vance Ahrens	126,487	40.64
Total votes		311,218	100.00
Republican hold			

=== 2025 special ===
2025 Florida's 19th senate district special election
Party	Candidate	Votes	%
Republican	Debbie Mayfield	37,546	54.44%
Democratic	Vance Ahrens	31,419	45.56%
Total votes		68,965	100%
Registered electors		401,336	
