= Bill Fulford =

American politician

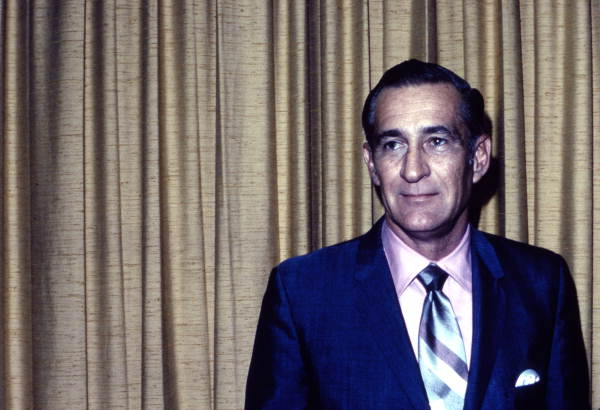
- Fulford in 1970

Member of the Florida House of Representatives from Orange–Osceola
- In office 1966–1967

Member of the Florida House of Representatives from the 40th district
- In office 1968–1978
- Preceded by: Robert H. Shadley
- Succeeded by: Richard Crotty

Personal details
- Born: July 9, 1923 Orlando, Florida, U.S.
- Died: October 10, 1990 (aged 67)
- Party: Democratic
- Education: University of Florida

Bill Fulford (July 9, 1923 – October 10, 1990), also known as W. E. Fulford and William E. Fulford, was an American politician. He served as a Democratic member for the 40th district of the Florida House of Representatives.

== Life and career ==
Fulford was born in Orlando, Florida. He attended the University of Florida.

In 1966, Fulford was elected to the Florida House of Representatives, serving until 1967. In 1968, he was elected to represent the 40th district of the Florida House, succeeding Robert H. Shadley. He served until 1978, when he was succeeded by Richard Crotty.

Fulford died on October 10, 1990, at the age of 67.
