= J. B. Rodgers Jr. =

American politician

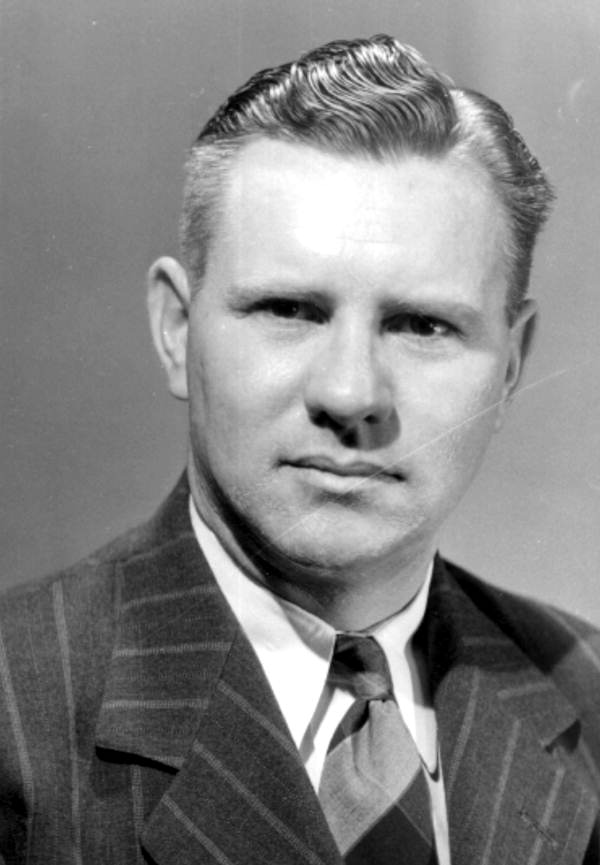
- Rodgers in 1949

Member of the Florida Senate from the 19th district
- In office 1949–1957

Personal details
- Born: 1912 Milton, Florida, U.S.
- Died: September 20, 2003 (aged 91)
- Party: Democratic

J. B. Rodgers Jr. (1912 – September 20, 2003) was an American politician. He served as a Democratic member for the 19th district of the Florida Senate.

== Life and career ==
Rodgers was born in Milton, Florida. He served in the United States Navy during World War II.

Rodgers served in the Florida Senate from 1949 to 1957, representing the 19th district.

Rodgers died in September 2003, at the age of 91.
