= Hilary Holley =

American politician (born 1989)

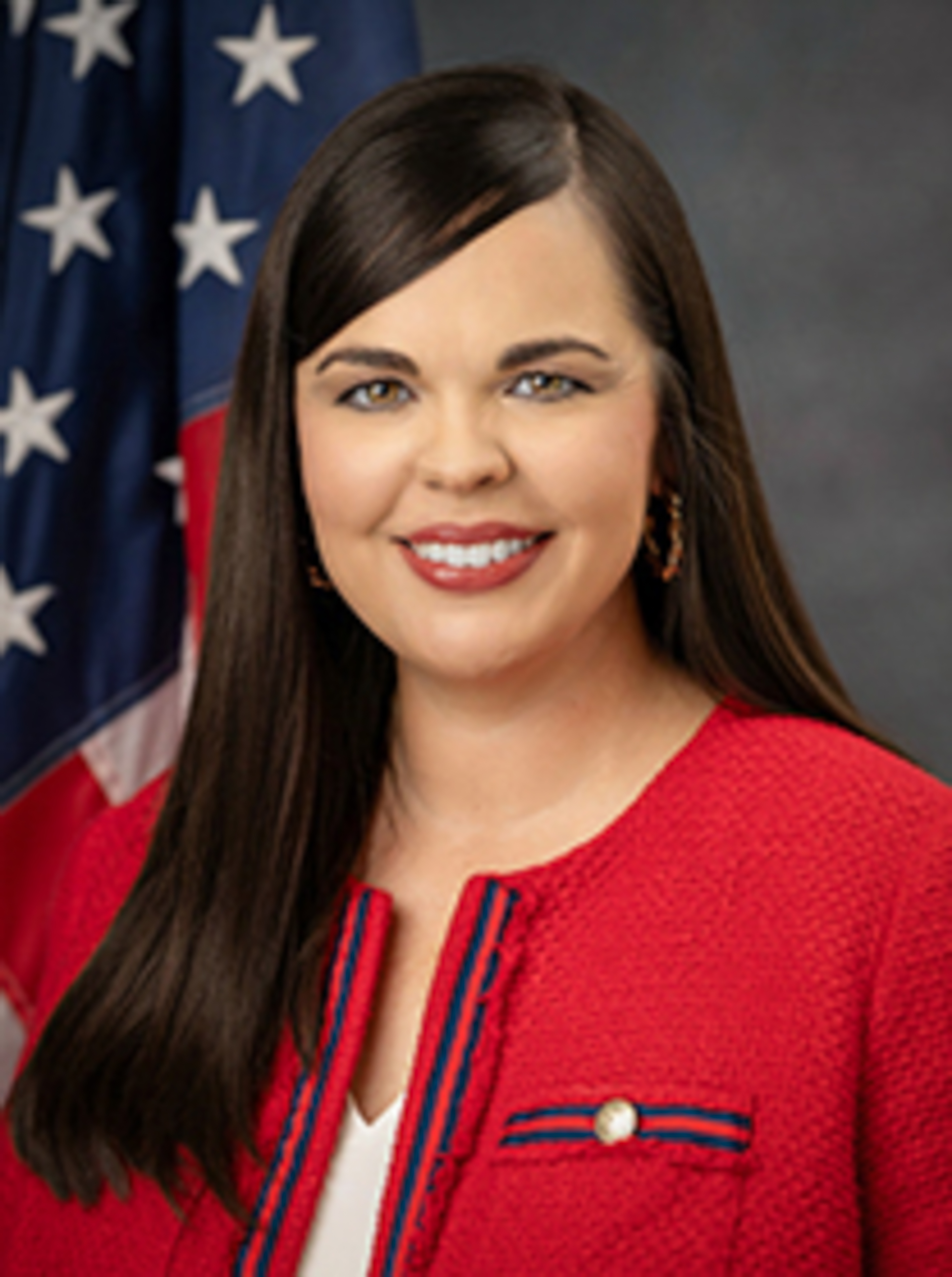

Member of the Florida House of Representatives from the 51st district
- In office March 24, 2026 – November 3, 2026
- Preceded by: Josie Tomkow
- Succeeded by: Octavio Hernandez

Personal details
- Born: February 6, 1989 (age 37) Punta Gorda, Florida, U.S.
- Party: Republican
- Spouse: Donald 'Dusty' Holley
- Children: 2
- Education: Santa Fe College (AA); University of Florida (BS)
- Website: Legislature website

Hilary W. Holley (born February 6, 1989) is an American Republican politician who has served in the Florida House of Representatives from the 51st district since March 2026. She has served as the executive director of the Florida FFA Foundation since March 2021.

== Early life and career ==
Holley was born in Punta Gorda, Florida on February 6, 1989. She earned an Associate of Arts from Santa Fe College and a Bachelor of Science from the University of Florida in agricultural education and communications. She worked as a legislative aide for state senator Denise Grimsley, an education coordinator for agriculture commissioner Adam H. Putnam, and for Florida Chief Financial Officer Jimmy Patronis.

== Florida House of Representatives ==
Holley ran in a March 2026 special election for Florida House of Representatives District 51 following incumbent Republican Josie Tomkow's resignation to run for State Senate. Holley was the only Republican to file and defeated the sole Democrat, Edwin Pérez, in the general election with 54.2% of the vote. Holley out-raised Pérez with $122,000 in donations and received nearly $134,000 in in-kind contributions while Pérez received over $13,000 in donations, loaned his campaign $2,000, and received $1,800 in in-kind contributions.

== Personal life ==
Holley lives on a ranch in Polk City, Florida, with her husband, Florida Cattlemen's Association Executive Vice President Donald 'Dusty' Holley, and their two children, Webb and Waverly.
