= 2002 Orange County, Florida Chairman election =

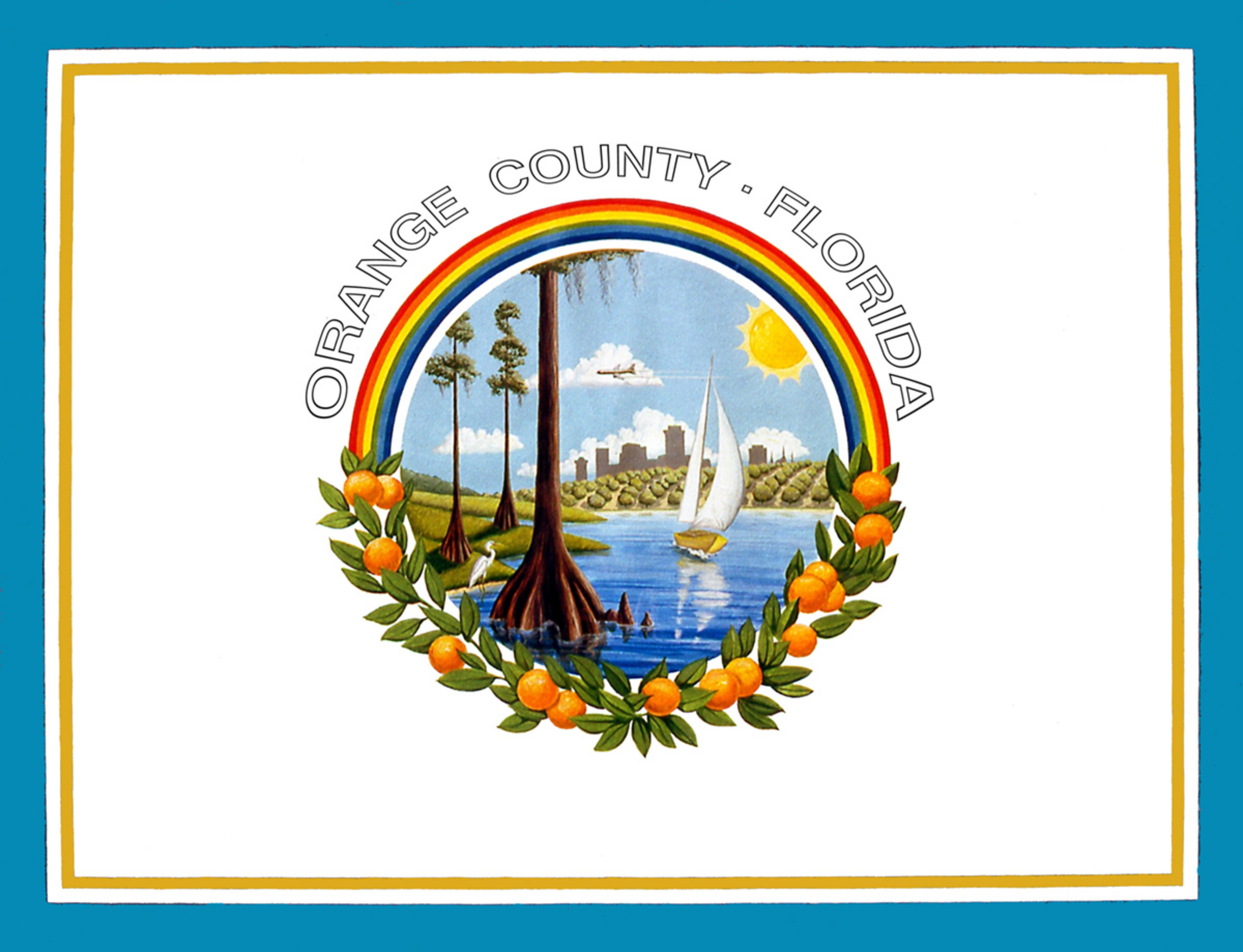
- September 10, 2002
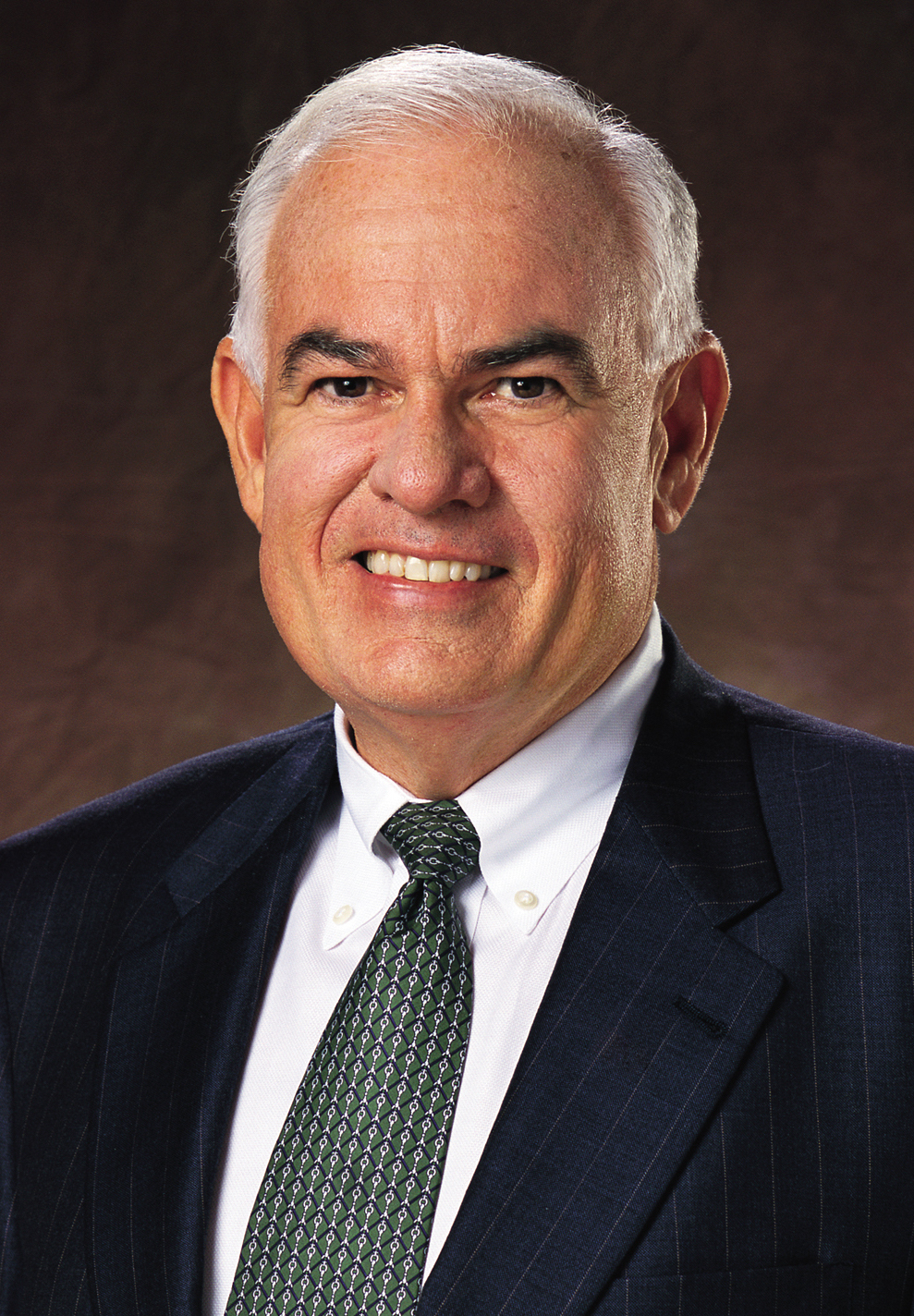

Candidate	Rich Crotty	Diana Vazquez Cook
Party	Nonpartisan	Nonpartisan
Popular vote	100,689	37,589
Percentage	72.79%	27.16%
Chairman before election
Rich Crotty
Nonpartisan
Elected Chairman
Rich Crotty
Nonpartisan

The 2002 Orange County, Florida, Chairman election took place on September 10, 2002. Following the resignation of Chairman Mel Martínez to become U.S. Secretary of Housing and Urban Development in 2001, Governor Jeb Bush appointed County Property Appraiser Rich Crotty to serve out the remaining two years of Martínez's term. In 2002, Crotty ran in the regular election for a full term. He was opposed by nonprofit executive Diana Vazquez Cook and write-in candidate Timothy Devine. The election was held on September 10, 2002, the date of the statewide primary. Crotty defeated Vasquez Cook in a landslide, winning 73 percent of the vote.

Following a 2004 amendment to the county charter that changed the name of the position to "Mayor," this was the last election for "Chairman."

== Primary election ==
=== Candidates ===
- Rich Crotty, incumbent Chairman
- Diana Vazquez Cook, nonprofit director
- Timothy Devine (write-in)

==== Declined ====
- John Ostalkiewicz, former State Senator, 1998 candidate for County Chairman

=== Campaign ===
When Crotty was sworn in as Chairman, he immediately announced that he would run in 2002 for a full term. His only challenger on the ballot was Diana Vazquez Cook, an executive at an affordable housing nonprofit. However, shortly before the filing deadline, a write-in candidate, Republican Timothy Devine, filed to run. Had only two candidates appeared on the ballot, the election would have been scheduled for November 5, 2002, but Devine's candidacy required that a primary election take place.

During the campaign, Vazquez Cook struggled to raise money and had little name recognition. Polling in the race indicated that Crotty would easily win a majority of the vote, with Vazquez Cook attracting comparatively little support.

The Orlando Sentinel endorsed Crotty for re-election, noting that he had "no serious competition in the race." It criticized Vazquez Cook for "offer[ing] no meat in her campaign beyond vague assertions that the county needs stronger leadership." The Sentinel praised Crotty for having "some notable achievements since being appointed," and observed that he "has the potential to be a strong voice for change."

Crotty ultimately defeated Vazquez Cook in a landslide, which he claimed gave him "a strong mandate to lead."

=== Polling ===
Poll source	Date(s) administered	Sample size (Note: Key: A – all adults RV – registered voters LV – likely voters CV – certain voters V – unclear)	Margin of error	Rich Crotty	Diana Vazquez Cook	Other / Undecided
Mason-Dixon Polling & Strategy	August 26–28, 2002	800 (CV)	± 3.5%	59%	12%	29%

=== Results ===
2002 Orange County, Florida, Chairman election
Party	Candidate	Votes	%
Nonpartisan	Rich Crotty (inc.)	100,689	72.75%
Nonpartisan	Diana Vazquez Cook	37,589	27.16%
Write-in		123	0.09%
Total votes		25,656	100.00%
