= Beth Johnson (Florida politician) =

American politician (1909–1973)

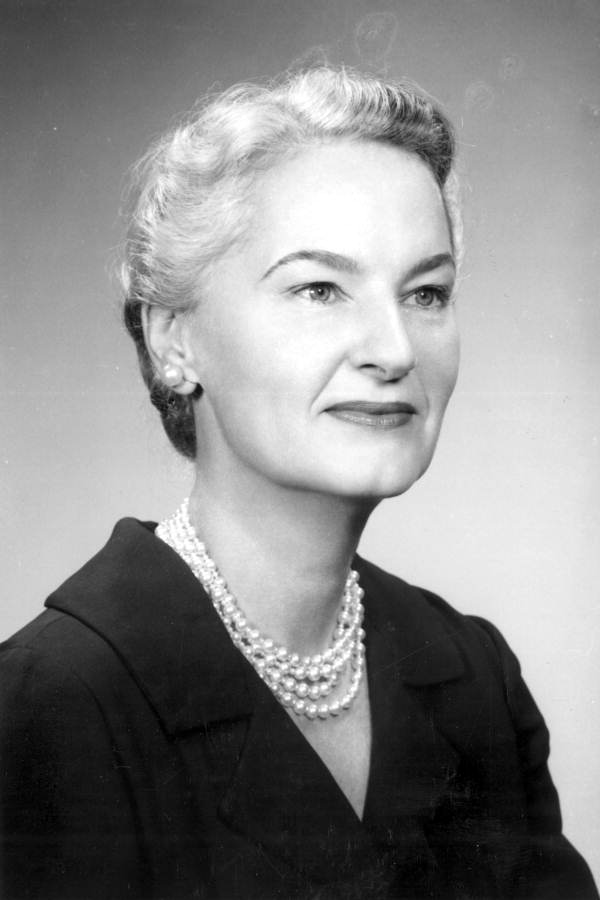
- c. 1965

Member of the Florida Senate from the 19th district
- In office 1962–1967
- Preceded by: John A. Sutton
- Succeeded by: Bill Young

Member of the Florida House of Representatives from Orange County
- In office 1959–1962 Serving with Jack C. Inman
- Preceded by: John A. Sutton
- Succeeded by: Robert Elrod

Personal details
- Born: 21 November 1909 Butler, Pennsylvania, U.S.
- Died: 1973 (aged 63–64) Florida, U.S.
- Party: Democratic
- Occupation: Politician

Elizabeth McCullough Johnson (November 21, 1909 – 1973) was an American politician. She served as a Democratic member of the Florida House of Representatives and Florida Senate for nearly a decade. Johnson became the first female state senator in Florida history upon her election in 1962. She had previously become the second woman elected to the Florida House, when she was chosen to represent Orange County in 1958. (Note: Florida switched to numerical district elections for the state house in 1966.)

Johnson was a leading advocate, along with former State Senate President William A. Shands, for the establishment of the University of Central Florida in 1963. She considered it, along with the creation of a statewide planning and zoning system, as her chief legislative accomplishments. Johnson was a member of the League of Women Voters, and was posthumously inducted into the Florida Women's Hall of Fame in 1986.

Senator Beth Johnson Park, a 1.26-acre (0.51-hectare) urban park located near Lake Ivanhoe in Orlando, is named in her honor.
