= Gary Siegel =

American politician (born 1949)

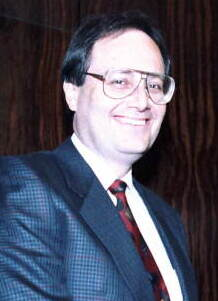

Member of the Florida Senate from the 12th district
- In office November 3, 1992 – November 8, 1994
- Preceded by: Rich Crotty (redistricting)
- Succeeded by: John Ostalkiewicz

Personal details
- Born: June 26, 1949 (age 77) New York City, New York
- Party: Republican
- Spouse: Carol Rooney
- Children: 3
- Education: University of Miami (B.A.); University of Memphis (J.D.); Georgetown University Law Center (LL.M.)
- Occupation: Attorney

Gary Siegel (born June 26, 1949) is a Republican politician from Florida who served as a member of the Florida Senate from the 12th district from 1992 to 1994.

== Early life ==
Siegel was born in New York City in 1949, and attended the University of Miami, graduating in 1971. He then graduated from the Cecil C. Humphreys School of Law at the University of Memphis with his Juris Doctor in 1974 and the Georgetown University Law Center with his master of laws degree in 1976. Siegel moved to Florida in 1976 and practiced as an attorney. He worked as an assistant county attorney in Seminole County from 1976 to 1978, and established his own law firm afterwards.

== Florida Senate ==
In 1992, Siegel ran for the Florida Senate from the 12th district, which included the suburbs of Orlando in Orange, Osceola, Seminole, and Volusia counties. He initially challenged challenged State Senator Rich Crotty for re-election in the Republican primary. After State Representative Art Grindle, a prominent car dealer, entered the race, Crotty announced that he would instead run for Orange County Property Appraiser. The contest between Siegel and Grindle was contentious, with Siegel accusing Grindle of "buying" his advanced from diploma mills. Siegel ended up narrowly defeating Grindle, winning 53 percent of the vote to his 47 percent.

Siegel faced retiree Jim Kelly, the Democratic nominee, in the general election. He defeated Kelly by a wide margin, receiving 63 percent of the vote to Kelly's 37 percent.

In 1994, Siegel ran for re-election. He was challenged in the Republican primary by John Ostalkiewicz, a businessman and parents' rights advocate. Ostalkiewicz launched an aggressive campaign, accusing Siegel of "parent bashing" through his support for criminal justice reform, and ultimately defeated Siegel, receiving 56 percent of the vote to Siegel's 44 percent.
