= Rich Crotty =

American politician

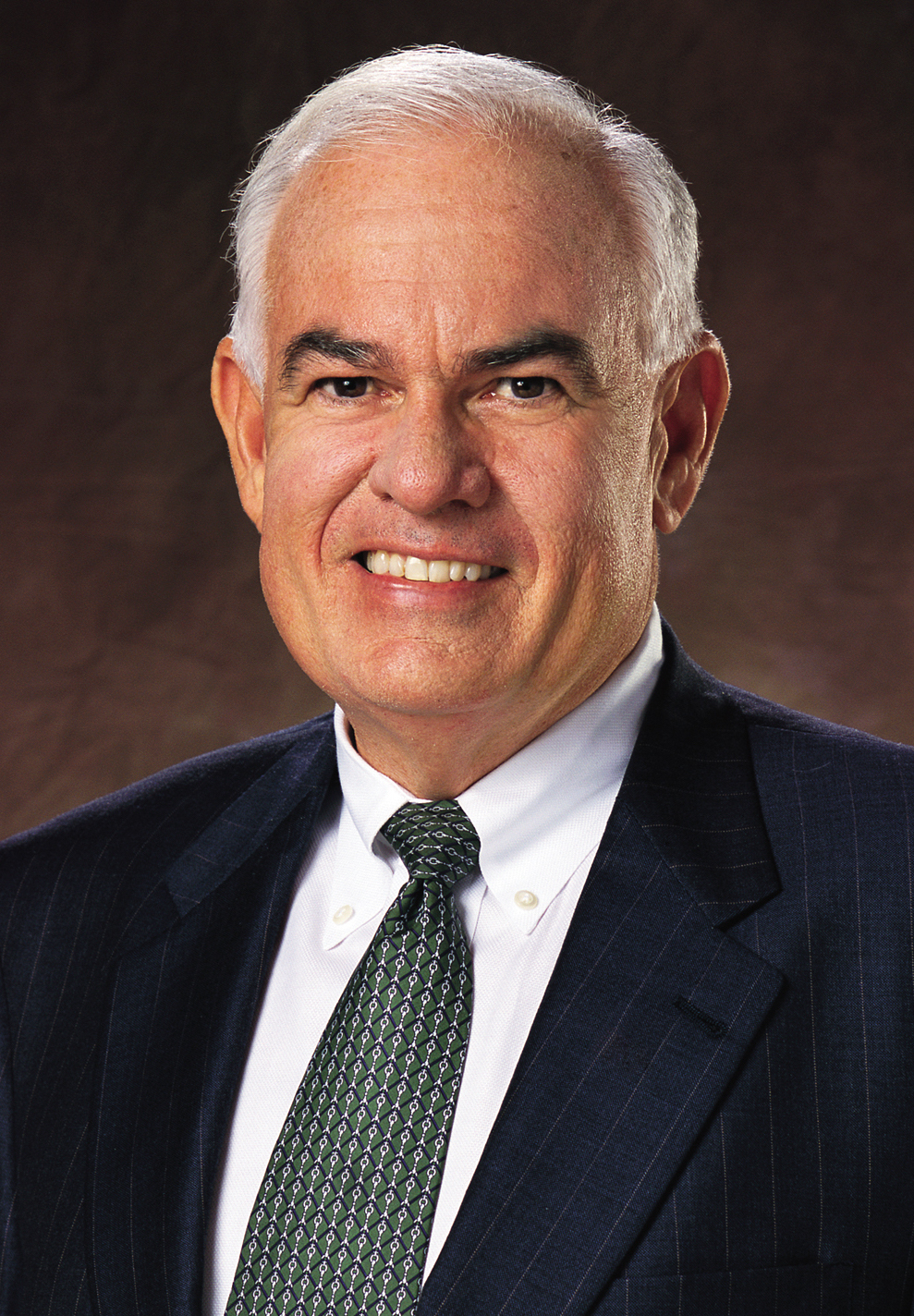
- Crotty in 2003

3rd Mayor of Orange County
- In office January 24, 2001 – January 3, 2011
- Preceded by: Mel Martínez
- Succeeded by: Teresa Jacobs

Property Appraiser of Orange County, Florida
- In office January 3, 1993 – January 24, 2001
- Preceded by: Ford S. Hausman
- Succeeded by: Bill Donegan

Member of the Florida Senate from the 14th district
- In office November 6, 1990 – November 3, 1992
- Preceded by: George L. Stuart Jr.
- Succeeded by: Gary Siegel (redistricting)

Member of the Florida House of Representatives from the 37th district
- In office November 2, 1982 – November 6, 1990
- Preceded by: Ron Richmond
- Succeeded by: Tom Feeney

Member of the Florida House of Representatives from the 40th district
- In office November 7, 1978 – November 2, 1982
- Preceded by: Bill Fulford
- Succeeded by: Alzo Reddick

Personal details
- Born: August 30, 1948 (age 77) Dobbs Ferry, New York, U.S.
- Party: Republican
- Spouse: Pam

Richard T. Crotty (born August 30, 1948 in Dobbs Ferry, New York) is an American politician who served as the Mayor of Orange County, Florida, from 2001 to 2011. He was previously a member of the Florida Legislature for 14 years.

== Biography ==
Crotty grew up in Orlando. He graduated from Valencia Community College in 1970 and University of Central Florida in 1972, and he also attended Florida State University.

After three years doing waste manage consultation under contract from the United States Environmental Protection Agency, he was selected to the Orlando Chamber of Commerce's first "Leadership Orlando" program. In 1978, he was first elected to the Florida House of Representatives. Later he served in the Florida Senate as the Republican Floor Leader.

The first piece of legislation he co-sponsored was the law that changed the name of FTU, his alma mater, to the University of Central Florida. He was the prime sponsor of the law that created the "Florida Prepaid College Tuition Program", the first and largest of its kind in the United States. One of the last pieces of legislation he sponsored was the "Junny Rios-Martinez Act" in 1992, named after the victim of former Florida Death Row inmate Mark Dean Schwab, which denied parole and early release to violent sexual predators.

After 14 years of service in Tallahassee, Crotty returned to Orlando and was elected the Orange County Property Appraiser in 1992. He began the upgrade of the office to include modern personal computer technology in its tasks.

On January 23, 2001, after the confirmation of Orange County Chairman (former name of the position of Mayor) Mel Martinez as the Secretary of Housing and Urban Development, Florida Governor Jeb Bush appointed Crotty to replace Martinez. Crotty was subsequently elected to the position in 2002, and re-elected in 2006, receiving 73% and 70% of the vote, respectively. The position of Orange County Mayor carries a term limit of two terms, but since Crotty was appointed in the latter half of Martinez's term, he was permitted to run for two full terms.

On September 10, 2010, it was confirmed that Armando Gutierrez and Crotty had negotiated the potential move of the Tampa Yankees to Orlando.

Crotty was a key supporter of an aggressive expansion project for Orange County Public Schools, which was passed by Orange County voters in 2002.

Crotty was a significant fundraiser for George W. Bush during the 2004 election.

Crotty was instrumental in winning a new medical school for the University of Central Florida and convincing the Burnham Institute to build a new research facility in Orange County as part of his vision for the Innovation Way high-tech corridor.

Richard Crotty currently serves as the executive vice president of Crossman & Company, overseeing their Corporate Advisory Services.

In August 2018, the Orange County Republican party elected Crotty as state committeeman, replacing Paul Paulson.

== Recognition ==
The Orlando Sentinel named Crotty the second most powerful person in Central Florida, behind Orlando Mayor Buddy Dyer, in 2008. In previous years, Crotty occupied the top position in that list.

== See also ==
- Teresa Jacobs
- Board of County Commissioners

Florida House of Representatives
Preceded by Bill Fulford	Member of the Florida House of Representatives from the 40th district 1978–1982	Succeeded by Alzo Reddick
Preceded by Ron Richmond	Member of the Florida House of Representatives from the 37th district 1982–1990	Succeeded by Tom Feeney
Florida Senate
Preceded by George L. Stuart Jr.	Member of the Florida Senate from the 14th district 1990–1992	Succeeded by Buddy Dyer
Political offices
Preceded by Ford S. Hausman	Property Appraiser of Orange County, Florida; 1993–2001	Succeeded by Bill Donegan
Preceded by Mel Martínez	Mayor of Orange County; 2001–2011	Succeeded by Teresa Jacobs
