= Curt Kiser =

American politician (born 1944)

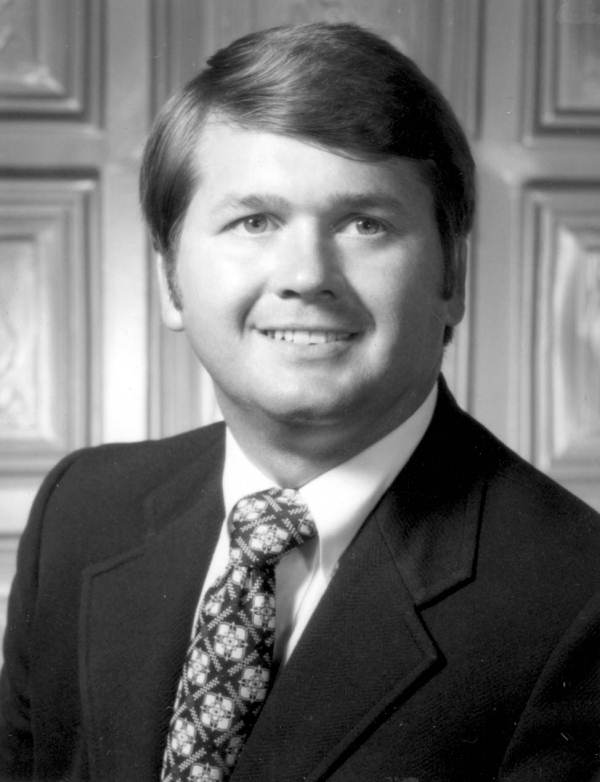

Member of the Florida Senate from the 19th district
- In office November 6, 1984 – November 8, 1994
- Preceded by: Jerry Rehm
- Succeeded by: Jack Latvala

Member of the Florida House of Representatives from the 54th district
- In office November 7, 1972 – November 2, 1982
- Preceded by: Dennis McDonald
- Succeeded by: Dorothy Sample (redistricting)

Personal details
- Born: June 17, 1944 (age 82) Oskaloosa, Iowa
- Party: Republican
- Spouse: Sally Hess
- Children: 2
- Education: University of Iowa (B.A.); Florida State University College of Law (J.D.)
- Occupation: Attorney

S. Curtis Kiser (born June 17, 1944) is a Republican politician from Florida who served as a member of the Florida House of Representatives from the 54th district from 1972 to 1982 and as a member of the Florida Senate from the 19th district from 1984 to 1994.

Kiser was born in Oskaloosa, Iowa. He served in the Florida House of Representatives for the 54th district, as a Republican, from 1972 to 1982. He was Minority Leader of the House from 1980 to 1982. He also served in the Florida Senate from 1984 to 1994 in Senate District 19. He Left his seat early to run for Lieutenant Governor under Tom Gallagher unsuccessfully in 1994.
