= Byron Combee =

American politician (born 1947)

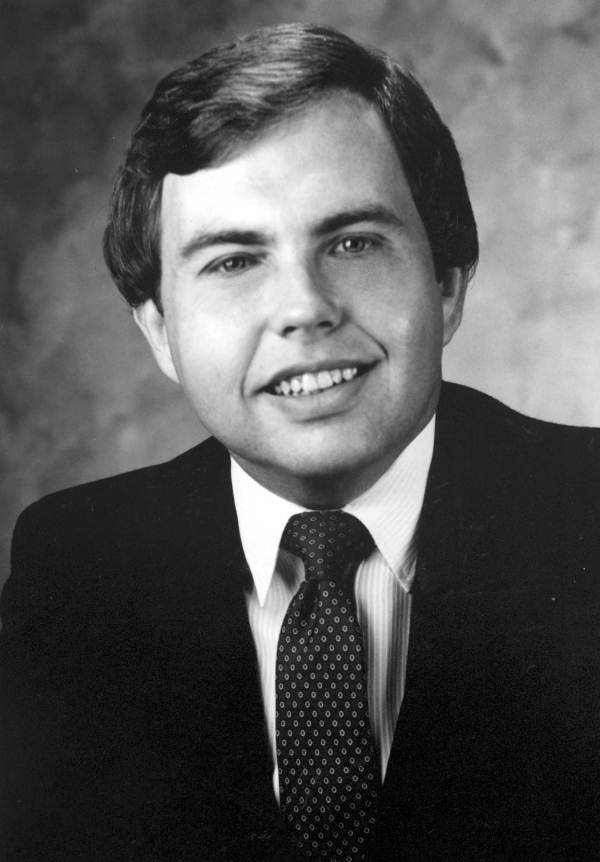

Member of the Florida House of Representatives from the 51st district
- In office November 2, 1982 – November 4, 1986
- Preceded by: James Harrison Smith Jr. (redistricting)
- Succeeded by: Jerry Rehm

Personal details
- Born: December 17, 1947 (age 78) Clearwater, Florida
- Party: Republican
- Education: St. Petersburg Junior College (A.A.); University of South Florida (B.A., M.A.)
- Occupation: Educator, real estate agent

Byron Combee (born December 17, 1947) is a Republican politician from Florida who served as a member of the Florida House of Representatives from the 51st district from 1982 to 1986.

== Early life ==
Combee was born in Clearwater, Florida, in 1947, and graduated from Clearwater High School. He attended St. Petersburg Junior College, where he received his associate degree, and the University of South Florida, graduating with his bachelor's and master's degrees in education. Combee worked as a teacher in the Hillsborough and Pinellas school systems. He served as the legislative assistant to State Representative Bob Melby.

== Florida House of Representatives ==
In 1982, Combee ran for the Florida House of Representatives, seeking to succeed State Representative Jim Smith in the 51st district. He faced home builder Rod Fischer and attorney William Lyman in the Republican primary, which he won with 54 percent of the vote.

In the general election, he ran against Democratic nominee Charlotte Hubbard, a legislative aide to State House Speaker H. Lee Moffitt. Both parties targeted the race, and Combee narrowly defeated Hubbard, winning 51 percent of the vote to her 49 percent.

Combee was re-elected unopposed in 1984.

In 1986, Combee ran for re-election to a third term. He was challenged by former Clearwater City Commissioner James Calderbank, but after Calderbank was arrested for having sex on a public beach, teacher Michael Klapka emerged as the nominee. On October 14, 1986, Combee was arrested and charged with engaging in a lewd act after he fondled an undercover police officer in a Clearwater park. He subsequently dropped out of the race, and was replaced on the ballot by former State Senator Jerry Rehm, who subsequently won the general election. Combee subsequently pleaded no contest to the charges.
