= Patricia Muscarella =

American politician and judge (born 1952)

Judge of the 6th Judicial Circuit of Florida, Group 18
- Incumbent
- Assumed office January 4, 2011
- Preceded by: George Greer

Member of the Florida House of Representatives from the 51st district
- In office November 6, 1990 – November 3, 1992
- Preceded by: Jerry Rehm
- Succeeded by: Mary Brennan (redistricting)

Personal details
- Born: September 24, 1952 (age 74) Clearwater, Florida
- Party: Republican
- Education: University of Florida (B.A.); Stetson University College of Law (J.D.)
- Occupation: Attorney

Patricia Ann Muscarella (born September 24, 1952) is an American judge from Florida who has served on the 6th Judicial Circuit of Florida since 2011. Prior to her judicial service, Muscarella served as a member of the Florida House of Representatives from the 51st district from 1990 to 1992.

== Early life ==
Muscarella was born in Clearwater, Florida, in 1952, and graduated from the University of Florida with her bachelor's degree in 1975. She later attended the Stetson University College of Law, graduating in 1984. Upon graduating, Muscrella practiced law with her father, Frank Muscarella, specializing in real estate law. She served as chair of the Clearwater charter review committee in 1988.

== Florida House of Representatives ==
In 1988, Muscarella ran for the Florida House of Representatives from the 51st district, challenging State Representative Jerry Rehm in the Republican primary. She lost to Rehm by a wide margin, receiving 35 percent of the vote to his 65 percent.

Muscarella challenged Rehm again in 1990, arguing that Rehm was ineffective and had ties to the Church of Scientology. Muscarella defeated Rehm, receiving 62 percent of the vote to his 38 percent. In the general election, Muscarella faced Democratic nominee Marilyn Dewey, a community planner, and won in a landslide, defeating her with 64 percent of the vote.

== 1992 congressional campaign ==
In 1992, Muscarella decided to challenge Congressman Michael Bilirakis in the Republican primary in the 9th district, stating that "Republicans have been asking me to run . . . because they do not believe that Mike can win the general election." She alleged that Bilirakis had improperly accepted free trips from special interest groups, and attacked him for seeking a fifth term despite his previous support for four-term limits. Bilirakis ultimately defeated Muscarella by a wide margin, winning renomination 67–33 percent.

== Judicial service ==
In 2010, Muscarella ran for a seat on the 6th Judicial Circuit of Florida to succeed Judge George Greer, who was retiring. In the nonpartisan primary, she faced Kathryn Welsh and Edward Liebling. Muscarella narrowly placed first in the primary, winning 40 percent of the vote to Welsh's 36 percent and Liebling's 24 percent, and she proceeded to the general election with Welsh. She emphasized her experience in dispute resolution, noting, "I think I'm fair, and I've been told this by many people who have come before me. They might not have liked the result but they believe they got a fair hearing and that's what you ask for in a judge." Muscarella defeated Welsh by a wide margin, winning the election with 57 percent of the vote.

Muscarella was re-elected without opposition in 2016 and 2022. In 2026, she announced that she would retire from the bench.
