= Luis Viera =

American politician

Member of the Florida House of Representatives from the 67th district
- Incumbent
- Assumed office November 3, 2026
- Preceded by: Fentrice Driskell

Personal details
- Party: Democratic
- Education: University of South Florida; Stetson College of Law
- Website: Campaign website

Luis Viera is an American politician. A member of the Democratic Party, he has served in the Florida House of Representatives since 2026, representing the 67th district. He succeeded fellow Democrat Fentrice Driskell in the 2026 election. He graduated from the University of South Florida and Stetson College of Law. He is a member of Tampa City Council.
