= Jack Latvala =

American politician (1951–2026)

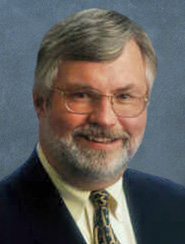

Member of the Florida State Senate
- In office November 2, 2010 – January 5, 2018
- Preceded by: Charlie Justice
- Succeeded by: Ed Hooper
- Constituency: 16th district (2010–12); 20th district (2012–16); 16th district (2016–18)
- In office November 8, 1994 – November 5, 2002
- Preceded by: Curt Kiser
- Succeeded by: Redistricted
- Constituency: 19th district

Personal details
- Born: November 3, 1951 Oxford, Mississippi, U.S.
- Died: July 8, 2026 (aged 74) Maine, U.S.
- Party: Republican
- Children: Chris Latvala
- Education: Stetson University (BA)
- Profession: Publisher

Woodrow John Latvala Jr. (November 3, 1951 – July 8, 2026) was an American Republican politician from Florida. He represented the Pinellas County area in the Florida Senate from 1994 to 2002, and again from 2010 to 2018.

Latvala was also a candidate for Governor of Florida in 2018, but withdrew from the race and resigned from his position in the state Senate following allegations of sexual harassment and public corruption.

== Early life and education ==
Latvala was born in Oxford, Mississippi on November 3, 1951. He moved to Florida in 1961, where he later attended Stetson University. He graduated in 1973 and later became the CEO of GCI Printing Services, which is based in Largo.

== Florida Senate ==
=== Elections ===
In 1994, Latvala ran for the Florida Senate from the 19th District, which included northern Pinellas and western Pasco Counties, defeating Democratic nominee Chuck Lehr 59.7 to 40.3%. In 1996, he won reelection over Sue Humphreys by a similar margin, and was reelected without opposition in 2000. Latvala could not run for reelection in 2002 due to term limits.

In 2010, when Democratic State Senator Charlie Justice decided to run for Congress rather than reelection to his 16th District, Latvala opted to run in the Pinellas and Hillsborough County seat. He defeated Pinellas County School Board member Nina Hayden in the general election.

After the 2012 decennial redistricting, Latvala ran in the 20th District, which was based exclusively in northern Pinellas County. Latvala defeated business owner Zahid Roy in the Republican primary, and deaf child welfare advocate Ashley Rhodes-Courter in the general election. The Tampa Bay Times endorsed Latvala for reelection, calling him "the most powerful independent voice among the Republicans," citing several instances in which he vocally opposed his own party. Latvala won nearly 58% of the vote in the general election. After court-ordered redistricting in 2016, Latvala's district was reconfigured to include northern Pinellas and southwestern Pasco Counties and was renumbered the 16th.

=== Issues and positions ===
While serving in the Senate, Latvala strongly supported legislation that would give manufacturers a sales tax break for any equipment they purchased, declaring, "We're going to be able to bring back manufacturing in north Pinellas County" through the legislation. Controversially, he sponsored legislation that aimed to speed up the foreclosure process in Florida, with the purpose of clearing up the foreclosure backlog and benefiting the local economy. Latvala joined with Democrats in the Senate to vote against a proposal advocated for by the Florida House of Representatives that would prevent new state workers from joining the state's publicly funded pension program, noting, "One of the reasons they work for the government is not for the salary. They haven't had raises in six or seven years. It's for the pension and if we want to continue to have the quality of employees that we have, we need to continue to offer that pension." Additionally, he joined with several other senators, including Eleanor Sobel, to lead the opposition to Public Service Commissioner Lisa Edgar's renomination, asserting that "she does not do an adequate job of representing the ratepayers and consumers of the State of Florida," specifically calling attention to what he felt was her coziness with utility companies.

=== Senate presidency ===
Beginning almost immediately after his return to the Senate in 2010, Latvala sought the support of his Republican colleagues to become Senate president for the 2016–2018 legislative term. In the following years, Latvala lobbied for pledges while rival conservative Republican Senator Joe Negron did the same. The leadership fight proved contentious and divided the Republican caucus, particularly during a court-ordered redistricting of the chamber's lines in 2015. While Negron declared he had support from a majority of the caucus in August 2015, Latvala refused to concede.

Latvala eventually conceded in November 2015, at the close of the special session to redraw the Senate districts. He endorsed Negron, who announced that Latvala would chair the Appropriations Committee during his presidency.

=== Sexual harassment accusations and resignation ===
In November 2017, six women accused Latvala of sexually harassing them. These accusations came from female staffers from both parties, as well as lobbyists. Photos also surfaced from a private investigator of Latvala kissing a lobbyist on the lips. The women's complaints describe repeated encroachment by Latvala onto their bodies.

One of the women, a legislative staffer, filed a complaint with the Senate. In December 2017, a special master found probable cause that Latvala had inappropriate physical contact with the staffer. The report also found that Latvala may have violated public corruption laws by demanding physical intimacy in exchange for support for lobbyists' legislative initiatives.

A separate report by a different investigator found evidence of similar allegations. On December 20, 2017, Latvala resigned from the Senate, effective January 5, 2018.

== Personal life and death ==
Latvala died in Maine on July 8, 2026, at the age of 74.

Florida Senate
Preceded by Curt Kiser	Member of the Florida Senate from the 19th district 1994–2002	Succeeded by Gary Siplin
Preceded by Charlie Justice	Member of the Florida Senate from the 16th district 2010–2012	Succeeded by Thad Altman
Preceded by Alan Hays	Member of the Florida Senate from the 20th district 2012–2016	Succeeded by Tom Lee
Preceded by Thad Altman	Member of the Florida Senate from the 16th district 2016–2018	Succeeded by Ed Hooper
