= Chris Nocco =

State legislator and former sheriff in Florida

Member of the Florida Senate
- Incumbent
- Assumed office November 3, 2026
- Preceded by: Ed Hooper
- Constituency: 21st district (2026–present)

Personal details
- Born: Philadelphia, Pennsylvania, U.S.
- Party: Republican
- Education: University of Delaware
- Profession: Sheriff

Chris Nocco is a state legislator and former sheriff in Florida. A Republican, he was elected to the Florida Senate in 2026. He served as sheriff of Pasco County, Florida for 15 years.
