= Florida's 21st Senate district =

Florida's 21st State Senate district
Senator
Chris Nocco; R–New Port Richey

Florida's 21st Senate district elects one member to the Florida State Senate. It contains parts of Pasco County and Pinellas County.

== Members ==
- Ed Hooper (2022–2026)
- Chris Nocco (since 2026)
