= John Ostalkiewicz =

American politician (1952–2010)

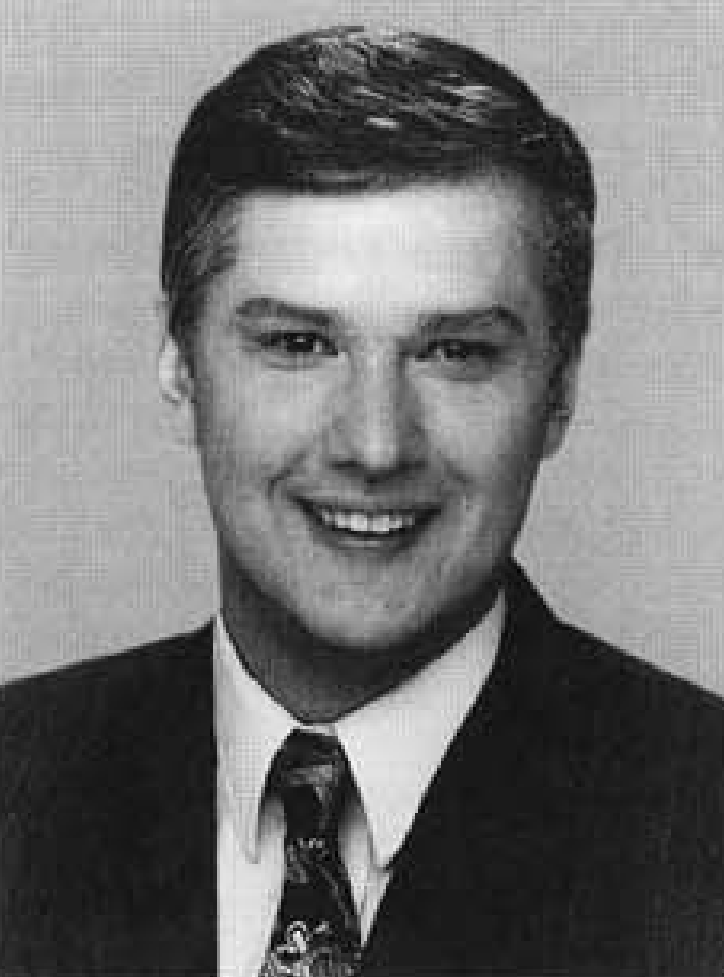

Member of the Florida Senate from the 12th district
- In office November 8, 1994 – November 3, 1998
- Preceded by: Gary Siegel
- Succeeded by: Daniel Webster

Personal details
- Born: September 19, 1952 Beverly, Massachusetts
- Died: May 25, 2010 (aged 57) South Korea
- Party: Republican
- Spouse: Cynthia Celona
- Children: 3
- Education: Babson College (B.S.)
- Occupation: Diamond importer

Clarence John Ostalkiewicz Jr. (Septembreer 19, 1952 – May 25, 2010) was a Republican politician from Florida who served as a member of the Florida Senate from the 12th district from 1994 to 1998.

== Early life ==
Ostalkiewicz was born in Beverly, Massachusetts, in 1952, and attended Babson College, graduating in 1974 with his bachelor's degree in accounting. He moved to Windermere, Florida, in 1988, and started a diamond-import business. Ostalkiewicz became a parents' rights activist after an employee's child was taken from them following allegations of child abuse.

== Florida Senate ==
In 1994, Ostalkiewicz challenged incumbent State Senator Gary Siegel for re-election in the 12th district, which included suburbs of Orlando in Orange, Osceola, Seminole, and Volusia counties. He attacked Siegel, the sponsor of several reforms to juvenile crime statutes, for "parent bashing," and campaigned on his support of parents' rights. The Orlando Sentinel endorsed Siegel, criticizing Ostalkiewicz for "[n]arrow thinking." han After an expensive campaign, Ostalkiewicz ultimately defeated Siegel, winning 56 percent of the vote to Siegel's 44 percent. No other candidates filed in the race, and Ostalkiewicz won the general election by default.

== 1998 Orange County chairman campaign ==
In 1998, rather than seek re-election, Ostalkiewicz decided to run for Chairman of Orange County to succeed Linda Chapin, who was term-limited. He faced Mel Martínez, the president of the Orlando Utilities Commission, and former County Commissioner Fran Pignone in the nonpartisan primary, and narrowly placed first, winning 41 percent of the vote to Martínez's 40 percent.

Ostalkiewicz and Martínez advanced to a runoff in the general election. Following the primary, Pignone, a Democrat, endorsed Martínez. Martínez ultimately defeated Ostalkiewicz by a wide margin, receiving 60 percent of the vote to Ostalkiewicz's 40 percent.

== Post-legislative career ==
After leaving the legislature in 1998, Ostalkiewicz served as the president of the Christian Coalition of Florida. In 2004, when State Senator Daniel Webster considered running for Senate, Ostalkiewicz explored a bid to succeed him in the State Senate, but Webster ultimately declined to run.

== Death ==
Ostalkiewicz was diagnosed with kidney cancer in 2009, and died on May 25, 2010, while in South Korea for treatment.
