= John Morroni =

American politician

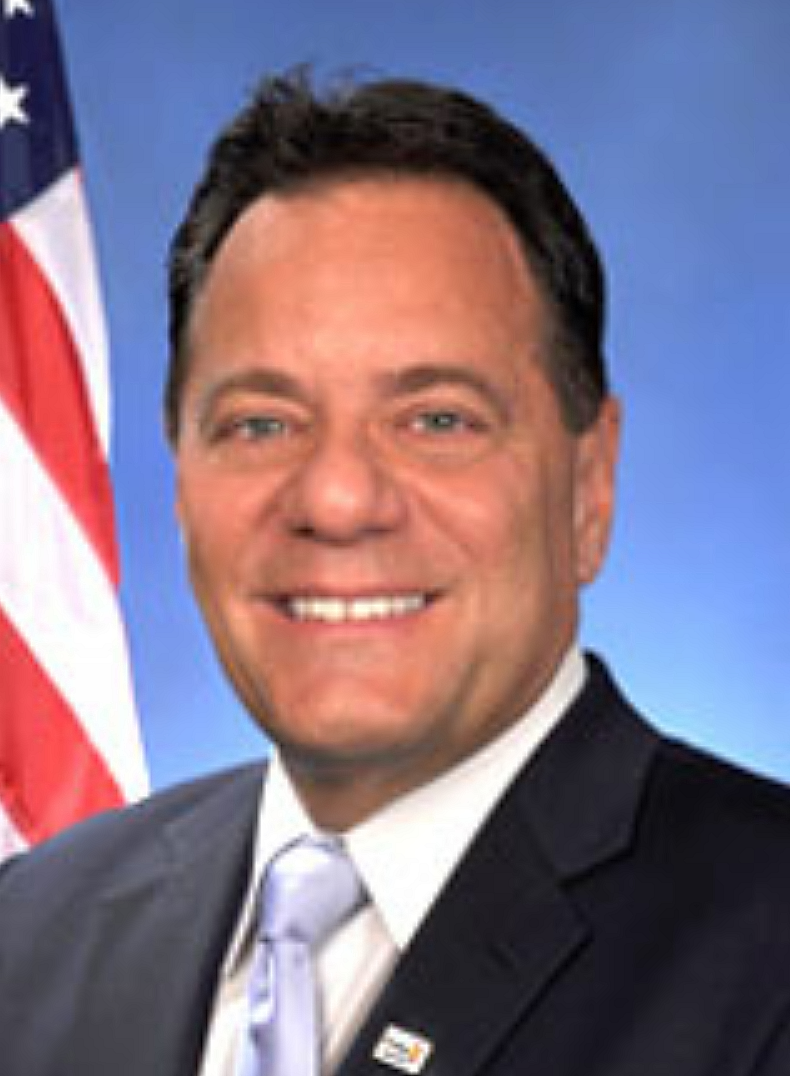

Member of the Pinellas County Commission from the 6th district
- In office January 2003 – May 20, 2018
- Succeeded by: J. J. Beyrouti

Member of the Florida House of Representatives from the 50th district
- In office November 1992 – November 2000
- Preceded by: R.Z. "Sandy" Safley
- Succeeded by: Kim Berfield

Personal details
- Born: February 16, 1955 Chicago, Illinois, US
- Died: May 20, 2018 (aged 63) Clearwater, Florida, US
- Education: Loyola University Chicago
- Occupation: Politician

John Morroni (February 16, 1955 – May 20, 2018) was an American politician and businessman. He served in the Florida House of Representatives and on the Board of County Commissioners of Pinellas County, Florida.

== Biography ==
Morroni was born in Chicago, Illinois. He graduated from Loyola University Chicago in 1977. In 1980, Morroni moved to Florida and worked in the real estate business. He lived in Clearwater, Florida.

Morroni served in the Florida House of Representatives from 1992 through 2000, when he was elected to the Pinellas County, Florida Board of Commissioners. He became the County Commission chair in 2012. Morroni was a member of the Republican Party.

Morroni was treated for Non-Hodgkin lymphoma in 2008, and a recurrence in 2011. Morroni died from leukemia on May 20, 2018.
