= John Ducker (cricketer) =

Australian cricketer

Personal information
- Full name: John Robert Ducker
- Born: 12 June 1934 (age 92); Prospect, South Australia, Australia
- Batting: Right-handed
- Role: Wicket-keeper

Domestic team information
- Years: Team
- 1952–53 to 1962–63: South Australia

Career statistics
Competition	First-class
Matches	30
Runs scored	1094
Batting average	26.04
100s/50s	0/6
Top score	76
Catches/stumpings	48/12
- Source: Cricinfo, 6 February 2018

John Robert Ducker (born 12 June 1934) is a former cricketer who played first-class cricket for South Australia from 1952 to 1963.

Born in Adelaide, Ducker was a wicket-keeper who played most of his matches for South Australia when the state team's principal keepers, Gil Langley and Barry Jarman, were away on national duty. He was a useful batsman whose best season was 1959–60, when he scored 489 runs at an average of 37.61, with five fifties and a highest score of 76 against New South Wales.
