= Chris Latvala =

American politician (born 1981)

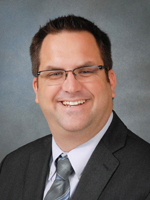

Pinellas County Commissioner, District 5
- Incumbent
- Assumed office November 8, 2022
- Preceded by: Karen Williams Seel

Member of the Florida House of Representatives from the 67th district
- In office November 4, 2014 – November 4, 2022
- Preceded by: Ed Hooper
- Succeeded by: Fentrice Driskell

Personal details
- Born: December 29, 1981 (age 44) Dunedin, Florida, U.A.
- Party: Republican
- Relatives: Jack Latvala (father)
- Education: Valencia College (AA); University of Central Florida (BA)

Christopher John Latvala (born December 29, 1981) is an American politician and former Republican member of the Florida House of Representatives. He currently serves as a Pinellas County Commissioner for District 5; previously, he represented the 67th District from 2014 to 2022. The district included Clearwater and Largo in northern Pinellas County.

== History ==
Latvala was born in Dunedin, Florida, to Jack Latvala, formerly a Florida State Senator from the 20th District. After his parents divorced, he grew up with his mother in Jacksonville.

Latvala attended Valencia Community College, receiving his associates degree in 2002, and the University of Central Florida, receiving his bachelor's degree in history in 2004. Following graduation, he began working as State Representative Ed Hooper's legislative aide, a position that he held from 2006 to 2009. After leaving the legislature as an aide, Latvala began working at his father's company, GCI Printing Services, where he currently works as Vice-President. Latvala was elected in November 2014 to Florida's 67th House District. Additionally, Latvala is a realtor with Smith & Associates based out of Pinellas County.

== Florida House of Representatives ==
In 2014, incumbent Representative Ed Hooper was unable to seek re-election due to term limits, so Latvala ran to succeed him. He ran against veteran Christopher Shepard in the primary election, and campaigned on the experience that he gained while working for Hooper, noting that it "taught him the value of constituent services--helping individual citizens with their state government problems." Latvala defeated Shepard with 67% of the vote and later defeated the Democratic nominee Steve Sarnoff with 53% of the vote.

Latvala was re-elected in 2016 with 58.6% of the vote, in 2018 with 54.0% of the vote, and in 2020 with 57.0% of the vote.

In 2021, as Chair of the Florida House Education and Employment Committee, Latvala supported legislation which would ban transgender athletes from competing in high school sports. The legislation was opposed by organizations such as Equality Florida, National Collegiate Athletic Association, and the Miami Heat.
