= Henry W. Land =

American politician

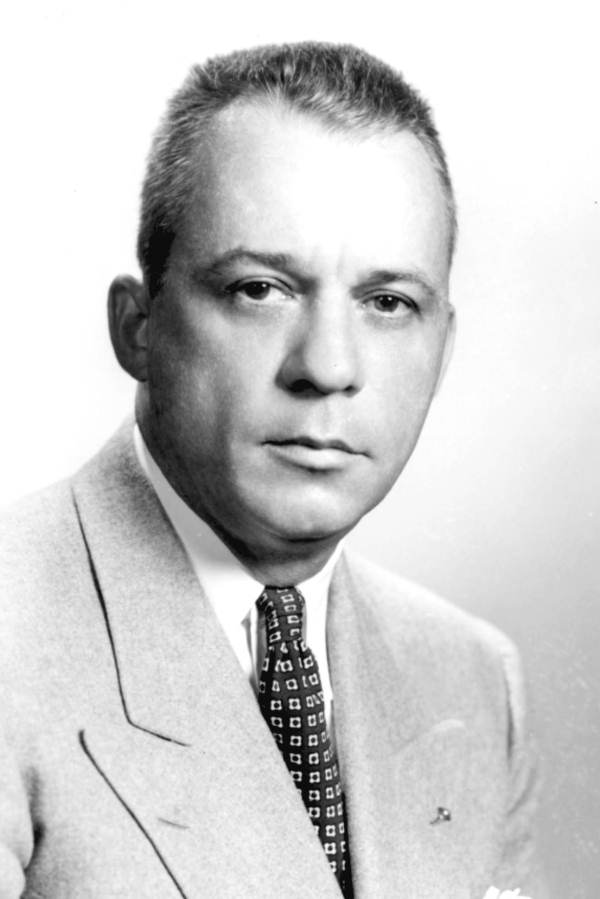
- Official portrait, c. 1953

Member of the Florida House of Representatives from Orange County
- In office 1953–1957
- In office 1962–1968

Personal details
- Born: July 3, 1913 Plant City, Florida, U.S.
- Died: October 13, 2002 (aged 89)
- Party: Democratic
- Education: University of Florida

Henry W. Land (July 3, 1913 – October 13, 2002) was an American politician. He served as a Democratic member of the Florida House of Representatives.

== Life and career ==
Land was born in Plant City, Florida. He attended the University of Florida. He was a businessman in Apopka.

Land served in the Florida House of Representatives from 1953 to 1957 and again from 1962 to 1968.

Land died on October 13, 2002, at the age of 89.
