= Florida's 67th House of Representatives district =

Florida district

Florida's 67th State House of Representatives district
Representative
Luis Viera; D–Tampa

Florida's 67th House of Representatives district elects one member of the Florida House of Representatives. It covers parts of Hillsborough County.

== Members ==
- Chris Latvala (2014–2022)
- Fentrice Driskell (2022–2026)
- Luis Viera (since 2026)
