= Richard Deeb =

Florida real estate developer and politician (1924–1990)

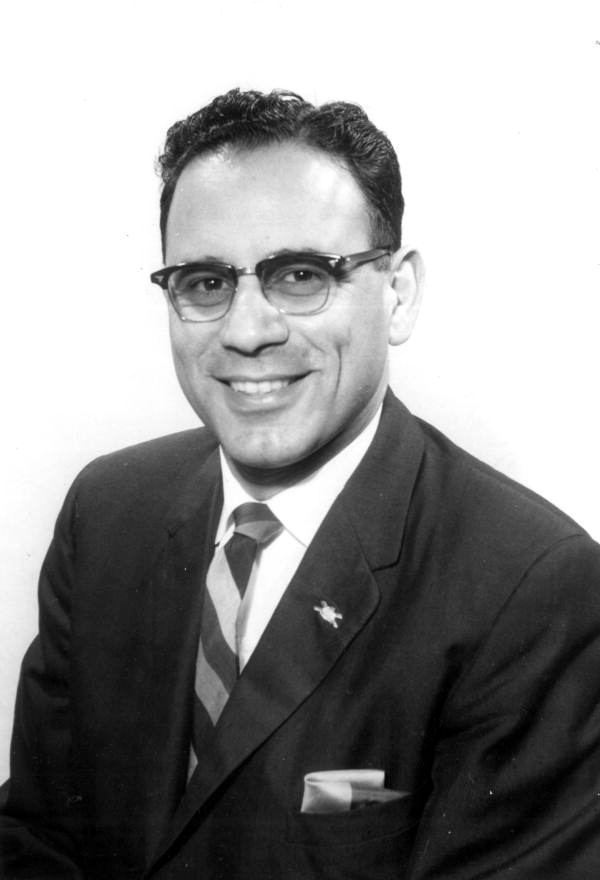
Richard J. Deeb (circa 1963)

Richard J. Deeb (1924 – August 6, 1990) was a real estate developer, Florida State Representative for two years and then a Florida State Senator. He represented the St. Petersburg, Florida area as a Republican. He was Arab American.

From 1982 until 1984, he was the chairman of the Pinellas County Republican Party.

He was born in Tallahassee and his father immigrated from Lebanon. He opposed school busing.

Deeb was involved in his family's homebuilding business.

He died August 6, 1990, aged 65 at his home, after being ill for three years and in relation to Parkinson's disease.

== See also ==
- Florida's 38th Senate district
