= Florida's 51st House of Representatives district =

Florida district

Florida's 51st State House of Representatives district
Representative
Hilary Holley; R–Polk City

Florida's 51st House of Representatives district elects one member of the Florida House of Representatives. It covers parts of Polk County.

== Members ==
- Josie Tomkow (2022-2025)
- Hilary Holley (2026-present)
