= John L. Ducker =

American politician (1922–2014)

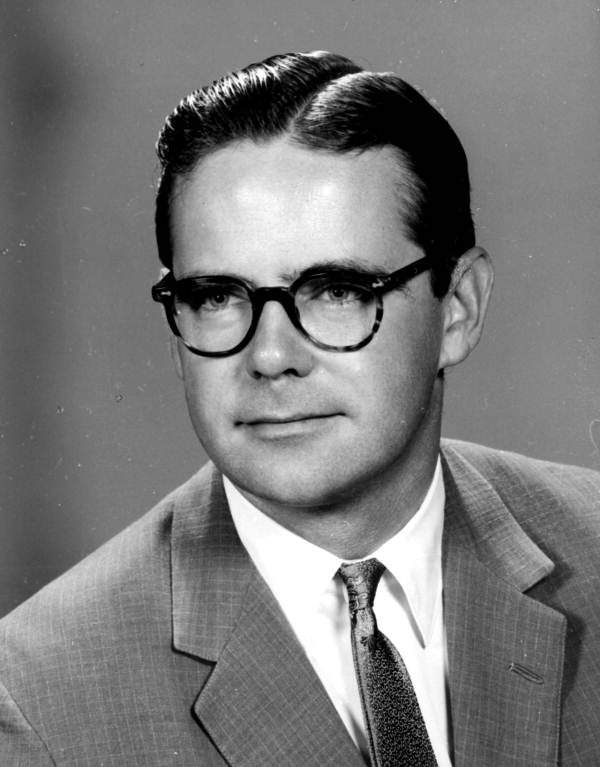

Member of the Florida House of Representatives
- In office 1960–1968
- Preceded by: Jack C. Inman
- Succeeded by: Cecil L. Bothwell Jr.

Member of the Florida Senate from the 17th district
- In office 1969–1971

Personal details
- Born: September 3, 1922 Fort Thomas, Kentucky, U.S.
- Died: April 15, 2014 (aged 91) Longwood, Florida, U.S.
- Party: Republican
- Education: Yale University; Yale Law School
- Occupation: Attorney

John Lackner Ducker (September 3, 1922 – April 15, 2014) was an American politician in the state of Florida. He was an attorney by profession.

Ducker was born in Fort Thomas, Kentucky. He attended Yale University and Yale Law School, attaining his law degree in 1950. He served in the Florida House of Representatives from 1960 to 1968. He was elected to the State Senate in 1968, serving until 1971.

Ducker was a member of Phi Beta Kappa. He was also active in the Young Republicans Club, American Legion, Bar Association of Florida, Sportsmen Association, Chamber of Commerce, Episcopal Church, and Boy Scouts. Ducker served in the United States Army's Signal Corps as a second lieutenant during World War II. He died on April 15, 2014, at the age of 91.
