= 2024 Florida House of Representatives election =

2024 State election

2024 Florida House of Representatives elections
- November 5, 2024

All 120 seats in the Florida House of Representatives 61 seats needed for a majority
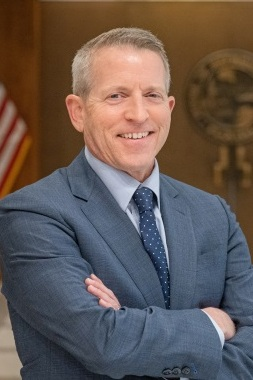

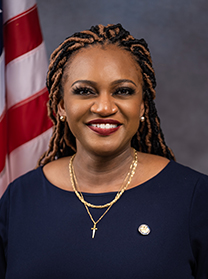
| | Majority party | Minority party |
|---|---|---|
| Leader | Paul Renner (term-limited) | Fentrice Driskell |
| Party | Republican | Democratic |
| Leader since | November 22, 2022 | November 22, 2022 |
| Leader's seat | 19th – Palm Coast | 67th – Tampa |
| Last election | 85 seats, 70.8% | 35 seats, 29.2% |
| Seats before | 84 | 36 |
| Seats won | 85 (Note: While not included in the final count, state representatives Susan Valdes and Hillary Cassel switched their party affiliation from Democratic to Republican one month after the election.) | 35 |
| Seat change | ▲1 | ▼1 |
| Popular vote | 5,554,635 | 3,817,390 |
| Percentage | 59.04% | 40.57% |
| Swing | ▼0.32% | ▲1.26% |
- Republican gain Democratic gain Republican hold Democratic hold 50–60% 60–70% 70–80% 80–90% 50–60% 60–70% 70–80% >90%
Speaker before election
Paul Renner
Republican
Elected Speaker
Daniel Perez
Republican

The 2024 Florida House of Representatives elections was held on November 5, 2024, as part of the 2024 United States elections. Florida voters elected state representatives in all 120 of the state's house districts.

Following the 2022 state House of Representatives elections, Republicans expanded their House majority to 85, up from 78 in the last election, giving them a supermajority in the House. The concurrently held Senate elections also resulted in a supermajority, giving Republicans supermajority control of the legislature.

Following the election, two Democratic representatives switched parties, giving the Republicans 87 seats to the Democrats' 33.

== Overview ==
| Party | Candidates | Votes | | Seats | | |
| Party | Candidates | No. | % | No. | +/− | % |
|---|---|---|---|---|---|---|
| Republican Party of Florida | 103 | 5,554,635 | 59.04% | 85 | +1 | 70.83 |
| Florida Democratic Party | 120 | 3,817,390 | 40.57% | 35 | -1 | 29.17 |
| Libertarian Party of Florida | 5 | 21,131 | 0.22% | 0 | 0 | 0.00 |
| Independent | 5 | 14,944 | 0.16% | 0 | 0 | 0.00 |
| Write-in | 4 | 459 | 0.00% | 0 | 0 | 0.00 |
| Total | | 9,408,559 | 100.00 | 120 | ±0 | 100.00 |
| Registered voters / turnout | | | | | | |
Source: Florida Department of State

House seats
| Republican | 70.83% |
| Democratic | 29.17% |

=== Closest races ===
Seats where the margin of victory was under 10%:

1. District 93, 0.40% gain
2. District 37, 0.62%
3. District 38, 0.84%
4. District 47, 1.62%
5. District 45, 1.68% gain
6. District 89, 2.54%
7. District 35, 3.94% gain
8. District 106, 4.22%
9. District 64, 4.76%
10. District 39, 5.12%
11. District 117, 5.76%
12. District 102, 7.08%
13. District 36, 7.26%
14. District 60, 7.30%
15. District 103, 8.28%
16. District 91, 9.12%
17. District 67, 9.30%
18. District 113, 9.36%

== Predictions ==
| Source | Ranking | As of |
|---|---|---|
| CNalysis | Solid R | August 7, 2024 |
| Sabato's Crystal Ball | Safe R | October 23, 2024 |

== Results ==
| District | Incumbent | Party | Elected | Party |
|---|---|---|---|---|
| 1 | Michelle Salzman | Rep | Michelle Salzman | Rep |
| 2 | Alex Andrade | Rep | Alex Andrade | Rep |
| 3 | Joel Rudman | Rep | Joel Rudman | Rep |
| 4 | Patt Maney | Rep | Patt Maney | Rep |
| 5 | Shane Abbott | Rep | Shane Abbott | Rep |
| 6 | Philip Griffitts | Rep | Philip Griffitts | Rep |
| 7 | Jason Shoaf | Rep | Jason Shoaf | Rep |
| 8 | Gallop Franklin | Dem | Gallop Franklin | Dem |
| 9 | Allison Tant | Dem | Allison Tant | Dem |
| 10 | Chuck Brannan | Rep | Chuck Brannan | Rep |
| 11 | Sam Garrison | Rep | Sam Garrison | Rep |
| 12 | Wyman Duggan | Rep | Wyman Duggan | Rep |
| 13 | Angie Nixon | Dem | Angie Nixon | Dem |
| 14 | Kimberly Daniels | Dem | Kimberly Daniels | Dem |
| 15 | Dean Black | Rep | Dean Black | Rep |
| 16 | Kiyan Michael | Rep | Kiyan Michael | Rep |
| 17 | Jessica Baker | Rep | Jessica Baker | Rep |
| 18 | Cyndi Stevenson† | Rep | Kim Kendall | Rep |
| 19 | Paul Renner† | Rep | Sam Greco | Rep |
| 20 | Bobby Payne† | Rep | Judson Sapp | Rep |
| 21 | Yvonne Hayes Hinson | Dem | Yvonne Hayes Hinson | Dem |
| 22 | Chuck Clemons† | Rep | Chad Johnson | Rep |
| 23 | Ralph Massullo† | Rep | J.J. Grow | Rep |
| 24 | Ryan Chamberlin | Rep | Ryan Chamberlin | Rep |
| 25 | Taylor Yarkosky | Rep | Taylor Yarkosky | Rep |
| 26 | Keith Truenow† | Rep | Nan Cobb | Rep |
| 27 | Stan McClain† | Rep | Richard Gentry | Rep |
| 28 | Tom Leek† | Rep | Bill Partington | Rep |
| 29 | Webster Barnaby | Rep | Webster Barnaby | Rep |
| 30 | Chase Tramont | Rep | Chase Tramont | Rep |
| 31 | Tyler Sirois | Rep | Tyler Sirois | Rep |
| 32 | Thad Altman† | Rep | Debbie Mayfield | Rep |
| 33 | Randy Fine† | Rep | Monique Miller | Rep |
| 34 | Robert Brackett | Rep | Robert Brackett | Rep |
| 35 | Tom Keen | Dem | Erika Booth | Rep |
| 36 | Rachel Plakon | Rep | Rachel Plakon | Rep |
| 37 | Susan Plasencia | Rep | Susan Plasencia | Rep |
| 38 | David Smith | Rep | David Smith | Rep |
| 39 | Doug Bankson | Rep | Doug Bankson | Rep |
| 40 | LaVon Bracy Davis | Dem | LaVon Bracy Davis | Dem |
| 41 | Bruce Antone | Dem | Bruce Antone | Dem |
| 42 | Anna V. Eskamani | Dem | Anna V. Eskamani | Dem |
| 43 | Johanna López | Dem | Johanna López | Dem |
| 44 | Rita Harris | Dem | Rita Harris | Dem |
| 45 | Carolina Amesty | Rep | Leonard Spencer | Dem |
| 46 | Kristen Arrington† | Dem | Jose Alvarez | Dem |
| 47 | Paula Stark | Rep | Paula Stark | Rep |
| 48 | Sam Killebrew† | Rep | Jon Albert | Rep |
| 49 | Melony Bell† | Rep | Jennifer Kincart Jonsson | Rep |
| 50 | Jennifer Canady | Rep | Jennifer Canady | Rep |
| 51 | Josie Tomkow | Rep | Josie Tomkow | Rep |
| 52 | John Temple | Rep | John Temple | Rep |
| 53 | Jeff Holcomb | Rep | Jeff Holcomb | Rep |
| 54 | Randy Maggard | Rep | Randy Maggard | Rep |
| 55 | Kevin Steele | Rep | Kevin Steele | Rep |
| 56 | Brad Yeager | Rep | Brad Yeager | Rep |
| 57 | Adam Anderson | Rep | Adam Anderson | Rep |
| 58 | Kim Berfield | Rep | Kim Berfield | Rep |
| 59 | Berny Jacques | Rep | Berny Jacques | Rep |
| 60 | Lindsay Cross | Dem | Lindsay Cross | Dem |
| 61 | Linda Chaney | Rep | Linda Chaney | Rep |
| 62 | Michele Rayner-Goolsby | Dem | Michele Rayner-Goolsby | Dem |
| 63 | Dianne Hart | Dem | Dianne Hart | Dem |
| 64 | Susan Valdes | Dem | Susan Valdes | Dem |
| 65 | Karen Gonzalez Pittman | Rep | Karen Gonzalez Pittman | Rep |
| 66 | Traci Koster | Rep | Traci Koster | Rep |
| 67 | Fentrice Driskell | Dem | Fentrice Driskell | Dem |
| 68 | Lawrence McClure | Rep | Lawrence McClure | Rep |
| 69 | Danny Alvarez | Rep | Danny Alvarez | Rep |
| 70 | Mike Beltran† | Rep | Michael Owen | Rep |
| 71 | Will Robinson | Rep | Will Robinson | Rep |
| 72 | Vacant | Rep | Bill Conerly | Rep |
| 73 | Fiona McFarland | Rep | Fiona McFarland | Rep |
| 74 | James Buchanan | Rep | James Buchanan | Rep |
| 75 | Michael J. Grant† | Rep | Danny Nix | Rep |
| 76 | Spencer Roach† | Rep | Vanessa Oliver | Rep |
| 77 | Tiffany Esposito | Rep | Tiffany Esposito | Rep |
| 78 | Jenna Persons | Rep | Jenna Persons | Rep |
| 79 | Mike Giallombardo | Rep | Mike Giallombardo | Rep |
| 80 | Adam Botana | Rep | Adam Botana | Rep |
| 81 | Bob Rommel† | Rep | Yvette Benarroch | Rep |
| 82 | Lauren Melo | Rep | Lauren Melo | Rep |
| 83 | Kaylee Tuck | Rep | Kaylee Tuck | Rep |
| 84 | Dana Trabulsy | Rep | Dana Trabulsy | Rep |
| 85 | Toby Overdorf | Rep | Toby Overdorf | Rep |
| 86 | John Snyder | Rep | John Snyder | Rep |
| 87 | Mike Caruso | Rep | Mike Caruso | Rep |
| 88 | Jervonte Edmonds | Dem | Jervonte Edmonds | Dem |
| 89 | David Silvers† | Dem | Debra Tendrich | Dem |
| 90 | Joseph Casello | Dem | Joseph Casello | Dem |
| 91 | Peggy Gossett-Seidman | Rep | Peggy Gossett-Seidman | Rep |
| 92 | Kelly Skidmore | Dem | Kelly Skidmore | Dem |
| 93 | Katherine Waldron | Dem | Anne Gerwig | Rep |
| 94 | Rick Roth† | Rep | Meg Weinberger | Rep |
| 95 | Christine Hunschofsky | Dem | Christine Hunschofsky | Dem |
| 96 | Dan Daley | Dem | Dan Daley | Dem |
| 97 | Lisa Dunkley | Dem | Lisa Dunkley | Dem |
| 98 | Patricia Hawkins-Williams† | Dem | Mitch Rosenwald | Dem |
| 99 | Daryl Campbell | Dem | Daryl Campbell | Dem |
| 100 | Chip LaMarca | Rep | Chip LaMarca | Rep |
| 101 | Hillary Cassel | Dem | Hillary Cassel | Dem |
| 102 | Michael Gottlieb | Dem | Michael Gottlieb | Dem |
| 103 | Robin Bartleman | Dem | Robin Bartleman | Dem |
| 104 | Felicia Robinson | Dem | Felicia Robinson | Dem |
| 105 | Marie Woodson | Dem | Marie Woodson | Dem |
| 106 | Fabián Basabe | Rep | Fabián Basabe | Rep |
| 107 | Christopher Benjamin† | Dem | Wallace Aristide | Dem |
| 108 | Dotie Joseph | Dem | Dotie Joseph | Dem |
| 109 | Ashley Gantt | Dem | Ashley Gantt | Dem |
| 110 | Tom Fabricio | Rep | Tom Fabricio | Rep |
| 111 | David Borrero | Rep | David Borrero | Rep |
| 112 | Alex Rizo | Rep | Alex Rizo | Rep |
| 113 | Vicki Lopez | Rep | Vicki Lopez | Rep |
| 114 | Demi Busatta Cabrera | Rep | Demi Busatta Cabrera | Rep |
| 115 | Alina Garcia† | Rep | Omar Blanco | Rep |
| 116 | Daniel Perez | Rep | Daniel Perez | Rep |
| 117 | Kevin Chambliss | Dem | Kevin Chambliss | Dem |
| 118 | Mike Redondo | Rep | Mike Redondo | Rep |
| 119 | Juan Carlos Porras | Rep | Juan Carlos Porras | Rep |
| 120 | Jim Mooney | Rep | Jim Mooney | Rep |

† - Incumbent term-limited or not seeking re-election

== Special elections ==
=== District 24 (special) ===
2023 Florida's 24th State House District special election
- May 16, 2023
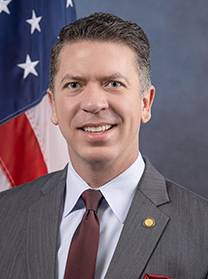

| Nominee | Ryan Chamberlin | Robert "Foxy" Fox (write-in) |
| Party | Republican | Republican |
| Popular vote | 6,685 | 1,886 |
| Percentage | 78.0% | 22.0% |
- Precinct results Chamberlin: 50–60% 60–70% 70–80% 80–90% >90%
State representative before election
Joe Harding
Republican
Elected state representative
Ryan Chamberlin
Republican

Joe Harding (incumbent) resigned after being indicted for wire fraud and money laundering.

Republican primary
| Party | Candidate | Votes | % |
|---|---|---|---|
| Republican | Ryan Chamberlin | 3,985 | 36.0 |
| Republican | Jose Juarez | 2,912 | 26.3 |
| Republican | Charlie Stone | 2,483 | 22.4 |
| Republican | Stephen Pyles | 854 | 7.7 |
| Republican | Justin Albright | 846 | 7.6 |
| Total votes | | 11,080 | 100.0 |

General election

2023 Florida House of Representatives special election, 24th District
| Party | Candidate | Votes | % |
|---|---|---|---|
| Republican | Ryan Chamberlin | 6,685 | 78.0% |
| Republican | Robert "Foxy" Fox (write-in) | 1,886 | 22.0% |
| Total votes | | 8,571 | 100.0% |
| Republican hold | | | |

=== District 35 (special) ===
2024 Florida's 35th State House District special election
- January 16, 2024
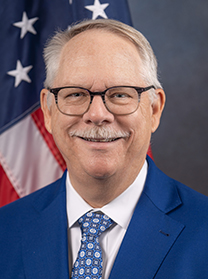

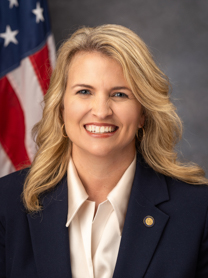
| Nominee | Tom Keen | Erika Booth |
| Party | Democratic | Republican |
| Popular vote | 11,390 | 10,800 |
| Percentage | 51.3% | 48.7% |
- Precinct results Keen: 50–60% 60–70% 70–80% 80–90% >90% Booth: 50–60% 60–70% 70–80% No votes/data
State representative before election
Fred Hawkins
Republican
Elected state representative
Tom Keen
Democratic

Fred Hawkins (incumbent) resigned to become president of South Florida State College.

Republican primary
| Party | Candidate | Votes | % |
|---|---|---|---|
| Republican | Erika Booth | 3,618 | 49.5 |
| Republican | Scotty Moore | 2,462 | 33.7 |
| Republican | Kenneth Davenport | 1,231 | 16.8 |
| Total votes | | 7,311 | 100.0 |

Democratic primary
| Party | Candidate | Votes | % |
|---|---|---|---|
| Democratic | Tom Keen | 2,296 | 36.1 |
| Democratic | Rishi Bagga | 2,118 | 33.3 |
| Democratic | Marucci Guzman | 1,952 | 30.7 |
| Total votes | | 6,366 | 100.0 |

General election

2024 Florida House of Representatives special election, 35th District
| Party | Candidate | Votes | % |
|---|---|---|---|
| Democratic | Tom Keen | 11,390 | 51.3% |
| Republican | Erika Booth | 10,800 | 48.7% |
| Total votes | | 22,190 | 100.0 |
| Democratic gain from Republican | | | |

=== District 118 (special) ===
2023 Florida's 118th State House District special election
- November 7, 2023
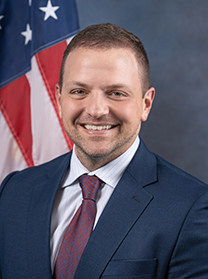

| Nominee | Mike Redondo | Johnny Farias |
| Party | Republican | Democratic |
| Popular vote | 4,538 | 3,997 |
| Percentage | 51.8% | 45.6% |
- Precinct results Redondo: 50–60% 60–70% 70–80% Farias: 50–60% 60–70% 70–80% Tie: 40–50%
State representative before election
Juan Fernandez-Barquin
Republican
Elected state representative
Mike Redondo
Republican

Juan Fernandez-Barquin (incumbent) resigned to become clerk of the court and comptroller of Miami-Dade County.

General election

2023 Florida House of Representatives special election, 118th District
| Party | Candidate | Votes | % |
|---|---|---|---|
| Republican | Mike Redondo | 4,538 | 51.8 |
| Democratic | Johnny Farias | 3,997 | 45.6 |
| Independent | Francisco De La Paz | 225 | 2.6 |
| Total votes | | 8,768 | 100.0 |
| Republican hold | | | |

== Detailed results ==
=== District 1 ===
Second-term incumbent Republican Michelle Salzman had represented the district since 2020.

2024 Florida House of Representatives election, 1st District
| Party | Candidate | Votes | % |
|---|---|---|---|
| Republican | Michelle Salzman (incumbent) | 58,623 | 65.8 |
| Democratic | Franscine C. Mathis | 30,466 | 34.2 |
| Total votes | | 89,089 | 100.0 |
| Republican hold | | | |

=== District 2 ===
Third-term incumbent Republican Alex Andrade had represented the district since 2018.

2024 Florida House of Representatives election, 2nd District
| Party | Candidate | Votes | % |
|---|---|---|---|
| Republican | Alex Andrade (incumbent) | 54,433 | 57.7 |
| Democratic | Haley “Hale” Morrissette | 33,337 | 35.5 |
| Independent | Kim Kline | 6,603 | 7.0 |
| Total votes | | 94,373 | 100.0 |
| Republican hold | | | |

=== District 3 ===
First-term incumbent Republican Joel Rudman had represented the district since 2022.

==== Endorsements ====
Joel Rudman

State legislators

- Shane Abbott, state representative
- Alex Andrade, state representative
- Patt Maney, state representative
- Michelle Salzman, state representative

2024 Florida House of Representatives election, 3rd District
| Party | Candidate | Votes | % |
|---|---|---|---|
| Republican | Joel Rudman (incumbent) | 80,019 | 78.4 |
| Democratic | Keith Ellis Gillum | 22,071 | 21.6 |
| Total votes | | 102,090 | 100.0 |
| Republican hold | | | |

=== District 4 ===
Second-term incumbent Republican Patt Maney had represented the district since 2020.

2024 Florida House of Representatives election, 4th District
| Party | Candidate | Votes | % |
|---|---|---|---|
| Republican | Patt Maney (incumbent) | 67,712 | 73.5 |
| Democratic | Samuel Chang | 24,428 | 26.5 |
| Total votes | | 92,140 | 100.0 |
| Republican hold | | | |

=== District 5 ===
First-term incumbent Republican Shane Abbott had represented the district since 2022.

2024 Florida House of Representatives election, 5th District
| Party | Candidate | Votes | % |
|---|---|---|---|
| Republican | Shane Abbott (incumbent) | 77,821 | 80.4 |
| Democratic | Stephanie Lyn Leonard | 18,973 | 19.6 |
| Total votes | | 96,794 | 100.0 |
| Republican hold | | | |

=== District 6 ===
First-term incumbent Republican Philip Griffitts had represented the district since 2022.

2024 Florida House of Representatives election, 6th District
| Party | Candidate | Votes | % |
|---|---|---|---|
| Republican | Griff Griffitts (incumbent) | 72,797 | 75.9 |
| Democratic | Jerry Wyche | 23,056 | 24.1 |
| Total votes | | 95,853 | 100.0 |
| Republican hold | | | |

=== District 7 ===
Second-term incumbent Republican Jason Shoaf had represented the district since winning a special election in 2019.

2024 Florida House of Representatives election, 7th District
| Party | Candidate | Votes | % |
|---|---|---|---|
| Republican | Jason Shoaf (incumbent) | 70,440 | 77.4 |
| Democratic | Kenny Beasley | 20,585 | 22.6 |
| Total votes | | 91,025 | 100.0 |
| Republican hold | | | |

=== District 8 ===
First-term incumbent Democrat Gallop Franklin had represented the district since 2022.

2024 Florida House of Representatives election, 8th District
| Party | Candidate | Votes | % |
|---|---|---|---|
| Democratic | Gallop Franklin (incumbent) | 54,473 | 72.2 |
| Republican | Grace Glass | 20,973 | 27.8 |
| Total votes | | 75,446 | 100.0 |
| Democratic hold | | | |

=== District 9 ===
Second-term incumbent Democrat Allison Tant had represented the district since 2020.

==== Endorsements ====
Allison Tant

Organizations

- EMILY's List

==== Polling ====
| Poll source | Date(s) administered | Sample size (Note: Key: A – all adults RV – registered voters LV – likely voters V – unclear) | Margin of error | Allison Tant (D) | Spencer Brass (R) | Undecided |
|---|---|---|---|---|---|---|
| Impact Research (D) (Note: Poll sponsored by Tant's campaign) | August 7–10, 2024 | 400 (LV) | ± 4.9% | 55% | 36% | 8% |

2024 Florida House of Representatives election, 9th District
| Party | Candidate | Votes | % |
|---|---|---|---|
| Democratic | Allison Tant (incumbent) | 62,100 | 57.1 |
| Republican | Spencer Brass | 46,750 | 42.9 |
| Total votes | | 108,850 | 100.0 |
| Democratic hold | | | |

=== District 10 ===
Third-term incumbent Republican Chuck Brannan had represented the district since 2018.

2024 Florida House of Representatives election, 10th District
| Party | Candidate | Votes | % |
|---|---|---|---|
| Republican | Chuck Brannan (incumbent) | 66,208 | 74.0 |
| Democratic | Robert “Bobby” J. Brady | 23,204 | 26.0 |
| Total votes | | 89,412 | 100.0 |
| Republican hold | | | |

=== District 11 ===
Second-term incumbent Republican Sam Garrison had represented the district since 2022, after being redistricted from the 18th district, which he had represented since 2020.

2024 Florida House of Representatives election, 11th District
| Party | Candidate | Votes | % |
|---|---|---|---|
| Republican | Sam Garrison (incumbent) | 67,517 | 69.1 |
| Democratic | Charlie Browne | 30,192 | 30.9 |
| Total votes | | 97,709 | 100.0 |
| Republican hold | | | |

=== District 12 ===
Third-term incumbent Republican Wyman Duggan had represented the district since 2022, after being redistricted from the 15th district, which he had represented since 2018.

2024 Florida House of Representatives election, 12th District
| Party | Candidate | Votes | % |
|---|---|---|---|
| Republican | Wyman Duggan (incumbent) | 46,441 | 57.1 |
| Democratic | Benjamin Frierson Sandlin | 34,934 | 42.9 |
| Total votes | | 81,375 | 100.0 |
| Republican hold | | | |

=== District 13 ===
Second-term incumbent Democrat Angie Nixon had represented the district since 2022, after being redistricted from the 14th district, which she had represented since 2020.

District 13 Democratic primary details

Democratic primary
| Party | Candidate | Votes | % |
|---|---|---|---|
| Democratic | Angie Nixon (incumbent) | 10,775 | 81.0 |
| Democratic | Brenda A. Priestly Jackson | 2,531 | 19.0 |
| Total votes | | 13,306 | 100.0 |

2024 Florida House of Representatives election, 13th District
| Party | Candidate | Votes | % |
|---|---|---|---|
| Democratic | Angie Nixon (incumbent) | 55,806 | 99.7 |
| Write-in | Terrance Jordan | 149 | 0.3 |
| Total votes | | 55,955 | 100.0 |
| Democratic hold | | | |

=== District 14 ===
First-term incumbent Democrat Kimberly Daniels had represented the district since 2022.

District 14 Democratic primary details

==== Candidates ====
- Lloyd Caulker, businessman
- Kim Daniels, incumbent
- Therese Wakefield-Gamble, entrepreneur

Democratic primary
| Party | Candidate | Votes | % |
|---|---|---|---|
| Democratic | Kimberly Daniels | 7,501 | 63.0 |
| Democratic | Therese V. Wakefield-Gamble | 3,854 | 32.4 |
| Democratic | Lloyd Caulker | 546 | 4.6 |
| Total votes | | 11,901 | 100.0 |

2024 Florida House of Representatives election, 14th District
| Party | Candidate | Votes | % |
|---|---|---|---|
| Democratic | Kimberly Daniels (incumbent) | 49,926 | 99.6 |
| Write-in | Briana Hughes | 183 | 0.4 |
| Total votes | | 50,109 | 100.0 |
| Democratic hold | | | |

=== District 15 ===
First-term incumbent Republican Dean Black had represented the district since 2022.

2024 Florida House of Representatives election, 15th District
| Party | Candidate | Votes | % |
|---|---|---|---|
| Republican | Dean Black (incumbent) | 75,184 | 64.8 |
| Democratic | Gary McManus | 40,762 | 35.2 |
| Total votes | | 115,946 | 100.0 |
| Republican hold | | | |

=== District 16 ===
First-term incumbent Republican Kiyan Michael has the district since 2022.

2024 Florida House of Representatives election, 16th District
| Party | Candidate | Votes | % |
|---|---|---|---|
| Republican | Kiyan Michael (incumbent) | 56,171 | 60.7 |
| Democratic | Rachel Grage | 36,340 | 39.3 |
| Total votes | | 92,511 | 100.0 |
| Republican hold | | | |

=== District 17 ===
First-term incumbent Republican Jessica Baker had represented the district since 2022.

2024 Florida House of Representatives election, 17th District
| Party | Candidate | Votes | % |
|---|---|---|---|
| Republican | Jessica Baker (incumbent) | 51,729 | 58.1 |
| Democratic | Bryson Morgan | 37,353 | 41.9 |
| Total votes | | 89,082 | 100.0 |
| Republican hold | | | |

=== District 18 ===
Fourth-term incumbent Republican Cyndi Stevenson had represented the district since 2022, after being redistricted from the 17th district, which she had represented since winning a special election in 2015. She was term-limited and could not seek re-election.

District 18 Republican primary details

==== Candidates ====
- Kim Kendall, businesswoman
- Nick Primrose, chair of the Florida Elections Commission

==== Endorsements ====
Nick Primrose

Federal officials

- Kat Cammack, U.S. representative from Florida's 3rd congressional district
- Rick Scott, U.S. senator from Florida

Statewide officials

- Ron DeSantis, governor of Florida
- Jimmy Patronis, chief financial officer of Florida

State legislators

- Cyndi Stevenson, incumbent state representative for this district

Labor unions

- Florida Police Benevolent Association

Republican primary
| Party | Candidate | Votes | % |
|---|---|---|---|
| Republican | Kim Kendall | 15,135 | 57.5 |
| Republican | Nick Primrose | 11,166 | 42.5 |
| Total votes | | 26,301 | |

2024 Florida House of Representatives election, 18th District
| Party | Candidate | Votes | % |
|---|---|---|---|
| Republican | Kim Kendall | 91,289 | 69.9 |
| Democratic | Keith Matthews | 39,290 | 30.1 |
| Total votes | | 130,579 | 100.0 |
| Republican hold | | | |

=== District 19 ===
Fourth-term incumbent Republican Paul Renner, the Speaker of the House, had represented the district since 2022, after being redistricted from the 24th district, which he had represented since winning a special election in 2015. He was term-limited and could not seek re-election.

District 19 Republican primary details

==== Candidates ====
===== Qualified =====
- Darryl Boyer, Renner's former travel aide
- Sam Greco, U.S. Navy officer (2019–2024)

===== Withdrawn =====
- Matthew Nellans, businessman
- Donald O'Brien, Flagler County commissioner
- James St. George, physician and candidate for Florida's 3rd congressional district in 2020

==== Endorsements ====
Darryl Boyer

Statewide officials

- Sarah Palin, former governor of Alaska (2006–2009)

State legislators

- Webster Barnaby, state representative
- Paula Stark, state representative

Sheriffs

- David Shoar, former St. Johns County sheriff

Local officials

- Gregory Hansen, Flagler County commissioner

Individuals

- Andrew Giuliani, son of Rudy Giuliani and candidate for governor of New York in 2022
Sam Greco

Federal officials

- Gus Bilirakis, U.S. representative from Florida's 12th congressional district (Note: Numbered as the 7th from 2007–2013)
- Marco Rubio, U.S. senator from Florida
- Michael Waltz, U.S. representative from Florida's 6th congressional district

Statewide officials

- Ron DeSantis, governor of Florida

State legislators

- Chuck Clemons, state representative
- Wyman Duggan, state representative
- Stan McClain, state representative
- Bobby Payne, state representative
- Paul Renner, Speaker of the House and incumbent state representative for this district
- Cyndi Stevenson, state representative

Sheriffs

- Rob Hardwick, St. Johns County sheriff
- Rick Staly, Flagler County sheriff

State attorneys

- RJ Larizza, state attorney for the Seventh Judicial Circuit

Labor unions

- Florida Fraternal Order of Police
- Florida Police Benevolent Association
- Florida Professional Firefighters

Republican primary
| Party | Candidate | Votes | % |
|---|---|---|---|
| Republican | Sam Greco | 14,728 | 63.6 |
| Republican | Darryl Boyer | 8,413 | 36.4 |
| Total votes | | 23,141 | 100.0 |

2024 Florida House of Representatives election, 19th District
| Party | Candidate | Votes | % |
|---|---|---|---|
| Republican | Sam Greco | 68,622 | 60.9 |
| Democratic | Adam Morley | 43,966 | 39.1 |
| Total votes | | 112,588 | 100.0 |
| Republican hold | | | |

=== District 20 ===
Fourth-term incumbent Republican Bobby Payne had represented the district since 2022, after being redistricted from the 19th district, which he had represented since 2016. He was term-limited and could not seek re-election.

District 20 Republican primary details

==== Candidates ====
- Judson Sapp, businessman and candidate for Florida's 3rd congressional district in 2020
- Jamie Watts, mayor of Welaka

==== Endorsements ====
Judson Sapp

U.S. representatives

- Aaron Bean, FL-04 (2023–present)
- John Rutherford, FL-05 (Note: Numbered as the 4th district from 2017–2023) (2017–present)

Statewide officials

- Jimmy Patronis, chief financial officer of Florida

State legislators

- Dean Black, state representative
- Chuck Brannan, state representative

Sheriffs

- Michelle Cook, Clay County sheriff
- Gator DeLoach, Putnam County sheriff
- Rob Hardwick, St. Johns County sheriff
- Billy Woods, Marion County sheriff
Jamie Watts

State legislators

- ~~Bobby Payne, state representative~~

Republican primary
| Party | Candidate | Votes | % |
|---|---|---|---|
| Republican | Judson Sapp | 14,935 | 64.9 |
| Republican | Jamie Watts | 8,080 | 36.4 |
| Total votes | | 23,015 | |

2024 Florida House of Representatives election, 20th District
| Party | Candidate | Votes | % |
|---|---|---|---|
| Republican | Judson Sapp | 74,164 | 75.4 |
| Democratic | Tom Connolly | 24,188 | 24.6 |
| Total votes | | 98,352 | 100.0 |
| Republican hold | | | |

=== District 21 ===
Second-term incumbent Democrat Yvonne Hayes Hinson had represented the district since 2022, after being redistrict from the 20th district, which she had represented since 2020.

2024 Florida House of Representatives election, 21st District
| Party | Candidate | Votes | % |
|---|---|---|---|
| Democratic | Yvonne Hayes Hinson (incumbent) | Unopposed | |
| Total votes | | N/A | 100.0 |

=== District 22 ===
Fourth-term incumbent Republican Chuck Clemons, the Speaker Pro Tempore of the House, had represented the district since 2022, after being redistricted from the 21st district, which he had represented since 2016. He was term-limited and could not seek re-election.

District 22 Republican primary details

==== Candidates ====
- Raemi Eagle-Glenn, former Alachua County commissioner
- Chad Johnson, former Levy County commissioner

Withdrawn:

- Robert Woody, vice-chair of the Santa Fe College district board of trustees

Republican primary results
| Party | Candidate | Votes | % |
|---|---|---|---|
| Republican | Chad Johnson | 11,941 | 66.5 |
| Republican | Raemi Eagle-Glenn | 6,006 | 33.5 |
| Total votes | | 17,947 | 100 |

District 22 Democratic primary details

===== Democrats =====
- David Arreola, former Gainesville city commissioner
- Amy Jane Trask, senior fellow for the Intercollegiate Civil Disagreement Partnership and granddaughter of Alan Trask

Democratic primary results
| Party | Candidate | Votes | % |
|---|---|---|---|
| Democratic | David Arreola | 7,359 | 56.7 |
| Democratic | Amy Trask | 5,610 | 43.3 |
| Total votes | | 12,969 | 100 |

==== Endorsements ====
David Arreola

State legislators

- Carlos Guillermo Smith, state senator-elect from District 17 and former state representative from District 49 (2016-2022)
- Yvonne Hayes Hinson, state representative from District 21 (2020-Present)

Local officials

- Cynthia Chestnut, Gainesville City Commissioner and mayor pro tempore (at-large B)
- Bryan Eastman, Gainesville City Commissione (District 4)
- Adrian Hayes-Santos, former Gainesville City Commissioner
- Lauren Poe, former mayor of Gainesville (2016-2023)
- Jacquelyn Randall, mayor of Hawthorne
- Reina Elise Saco, Gainesville City Commissioner (at-large A)
- Harvey Ward, mayor of Gainesville (2023-present)
- Helen Warren, former Gainesville City Commissioner
- Casey Willits, Gainesville City Commissioner (District 3)
- Steve B. Wilson, mayor of Belle Glade

Unions and organizations

- Equality Florida
- Florida AFL-CIO
- International Brotherhood of Electrical Workers
- Latino Victory
Chad Johnson

State legislators

- Chuck Clemons, speaker pro temp of the Florida House of Representatives, incumbent for this district

==== Predictions ====
| Source | Rating | As of |
|---|---|---|
| CNalysis | Tilt R | August 30, 2024 |

==== General election ====
2024 Florida House of Representatives election, 22nd District
| Party | Candidate | Votes | % |
|---|---|---|---|
| Republican | Chad Johnson | 56,989 | 56.5 |
| Democratic | David Arreola | 43,812 | 43.5 |
| Total votes | | 100,801 | 100.0 |
| Republican hold | | | |

=== District 23 ===
Fourth-term incumbent Republican Ralph Massullo had represented the district since 2022, after being redistricted from the 34th district, which he had represented since 2016. He was term-limited and could not seek re-election.

2024 Florida House of Representatives election, 23rd District
| Party | Candidate | Votes | % |
|---|---|---|---|
| Republican | J.J. Grow | 80,332 | 73.9 |
| Democratic | Judith Vowels | 28,364 | 26.1 |
| Total votes | | 108,696 | 100.0 |
| Republican hold | | | |

=== District 24 ===
First-term incumbent Republican Ryan Chamberlin had represented the district since winning a special election in 2023.

2024 Florida House of Representatives election, 24th District
| Party | Candidate | Votes | % |
|---|---|---|---|
| Republican | Ryan Chamberlin (incumbent) | 66,082 | 64.4 |
| Democratic | Robert L. Shaw | 36,516 | 35.6 |
| Total votes | | 102,598 | 100.0 |
| Republican hold | | | |

=== District 25 ===
First-term incumbent Republican Taylor Yarkosky had represented the district since 2022.

2024 Florida House of Representatives election, 25th District
| Party | Candidate | Votes | % |
|---|---|---|---|
| Republican | Taylor Yarkosky (incumbent) | 63,094 | 60.0 |
| Democratic | Fody Merritt | 41,984 | 40.0 |
| Total votes | | 105,078 | 100.0 |
| Republican hold | | | |

=== District 26 ===
Second-term incumbent Republican Keith Truenow had represented the district since 2022, after being redistricted from the 31st district, which he had represented since 2020. He retired to run for State Senate.

District 26 primary details

==== Republicans ====
- Nan Cobb, tractor dealership owner
- Mark Jordan, retired first responder
- Michael Levine
- Addie Owens, businesswoman

Republican primary
| Party | Candidate | Votes | % |
|---|---|---|---|
| Republican | Nan Cobb | 6,298 | 34.9 |
| Republican | Addie Owens | 4,801 | 26.6 |
| Republican | Mike Levine | 4,460 | 24.7 |
| Republican | Keith Farner | 2,468 | 13.7 |
| Total votes | | 18,027 | 100.0 |

2024 Florida House of Representatives election, 26th District
| Party | Candidate | Votes | % |
|---|---|---|---|
| Republican | Nan Cobb | 62,067 | 64.9 |
| Democratic | Jackie Arndt | 33,505 | 35.1 |
| Total votes | | 95,572 | 100.0 |
| Republican hold | | | |

=== District 27 ===
Fourth-term incumbent Republican Stan McClain had represented the district since 2022, after being redistricted from the 23rd district, which he had represented since 2016. He was term-limited and could not seek re-election, and successfully ran for State Senate.

District 27 Republican primary details

==== Candidates ====
- Richard Gentry, lawyer
- Stephen Shives, businessman
- Beckie Sirolli

==== Endorsements ====
Richard Gentry

Sheriffs

- Mike Chitwood, Volusia County sheriff (Independent)
- Peyton Grinnell, Lake County sheriff
- Billy Woods, Marion County sheriff

Republican primary
| Party | Candidate | Votes | % |
|---|---|---|---|
| Republican | Richard Gentry | 6,335 | 36.9 |
| Republican | Steve Shives | 5,679 | 33.0 |
| Republican | Beckie Sirolli | 5,173 | 30.1 |
| Total votes | | 17,187 | 100.0 |

2024 Florida House of Representatives election, 27th District
| Party | Candidate | Votes | % |
|---|---|---|---|
| Republican | Richard Gentry | 69,227 | 67.9 |
| Democratic | Andy Ferrari | 30,707 | 30.1 |
| Libertarian | Dennis M. Simpson | 1,982 | 1.9 |
| Total votes | | 101,916 | 100.0 |
| Republican hold | | | |

=== District 28 ===
Fourth-term incumbent Republican Tom Leek had represented the district since 2022, after being redistricted from the 25th district, which he had represented since 2016. He was term-limited and could not seek re-election, and successfully ran for State Senate.

2024 Florida House of Representatives election, 28th District
| Party | Candidate | Votes | % |
|---|---|---|---|
| Republican | Bill Partington | 53,490 | 57.7 |
| Democratic | John Navarra | 37,005 | 39.9 |
| Libertarian | Joseph “Joe” Hannoush | 2,157 | 2.3 |
| Total votes | | 92,652 | 100.0 |
| Republican hold | | | |

=== District 29 ===
Second-term incumbent Republican Webster Barnaby had represented the district since 2020.

2024 Florida House of Representatives election, 29th District
| Party | Candidate | Votes | % |
|---|---|---|---|
| Republican | Webster Barnaby (incumbent) | 49,285 | 55.6 |
| Democratic | Rosemarie Latham | 36,790 | 41.5 |
| Libertarian | Matt Johnson | 2,514 | 2.8 |
| Total votes | | 88,589 | 100.0 |
| Republican hold | | | |

=== District 30 ===
First-term incumbent Republican Chase Tramont had represented the district since 2022.

2024 Florida House of Representatives election, 30th District
| Party | Candidate | Votes | % |
|---|---|---|---|
| Republican | Chase Tramont (incumbent) | 70,142 | 65.6 |
| Democratic | Kelly Smith | 36,835 | 34.4 |
| Total votes | | 106,977 | 100.0 |
| Republican hold | | | |

=== District 31 ===
Third-term incumbent Republican Tyler Sirois had represented the district since 2022, after being redistricted from the 51st district, which he had represented since 2018.

2024 Florida House of Representatives election, 31st District
| Party | Candidate | Votes | % |
|---|---|---|---|
| Republican | Tyler Sirois (incumbent) | 64,480 | 63.7 |
| Democratic | Joanne R. Terry | 36,769 | 36.3 |
| Total votes | | 101,249 | 100.0 |
| Republican hold | | | |

=== District 32 ===
Fourth-term incumbent Republican Thad Altman had represented the district since 2022, after being redistricted from the 52nd district, which he had represented since 2016. He was term-limited and could not seek re-election.

District 32 Republican primary details

==== Candidates ====
- Debbie Mayfield, state senator
- Dave Weldon, former U.S. representative for Florida's 15th congressional district (1995–2009)

==== Endorsements ====
Debbie Mayfield

U.S. presidents

- Donald Trump, former president of the United States (2017–2021)

Statewide officials

- Wilton Simpson, Florida commissioner of agriculture

Republican primary
| Party | Candidate | Votes | % |
|---|---|---|---|
| Republican | Debbie Mayfield | 13,281 | 64.8 |
| Republican | Dave Weldon | 7,205 | 35.2 |
| Total votes | | 20,486 | 100.0 |

2024 Florida House of Representatives election, 32nd District
| Party | Candidate | Votes | % |
|---|---|---|---|
| Republican | Debbie Mayfield | 70,925 | 64.3 |
| Democratic | Juan Hinojosa | 39,416 | 35.7 |
| Total votes | | 110,341 | 100.0 |
| Republican hold | | | |

=== District 33 ===
Fourth-term incumbent Republican Randy Fine had represented the district since 2016. He was term-limited and could not seek re-election, and was running for state senate.

District 33 Republican primary details

==== Candidates ====
- Chandler Langevin, Marine veteran (withdrew, endorsed Miller)
- Logan Luse, Florida state director of the American Conservation Coalition
- Monique Miller, activist
- Erika Orriss, mental health professional

==== Endorsements ====
Chandler Langevin

Mayors

- Wes Morrison, former Cape Canaveral mayor

Republican primary
| Party | Candidate | Votes | % |
|---|---|---|---|
| Republican | Monique Miller | 7,842 | 55.0 |
| Republican | Mike Limongello | 3,425 | 24.0 |
| Republican | Erika Orriss | 1,613 | 11.3 |
| Republican | Logan Luse | 1,373 | 9.6 |
| Total votes | | 14,253 | 100.0 |

District 33 Democratic primary details

===== Candidates =====
- Anthony Yantz, candidate for this district in 2022

Democratic primary
| Party | Candidate | Votes | % |
|---|---|---|---|
| Democratic | Vernon Mitchell Anderson | 5,133 | 53.0 |
| Democratic | Anthony Yantz | 4,558 | 47.0 |
| Total votes | | 9,691 | 100.0 |

2024 Florida House of Representatives election, 33rd District
| Party | Candidate | Votes | % |
|---|---|---|---|
| Republican | Monique Miller | 54,897 | 56.1 |
| Democratic | Vernon Mitchell Anderson | 42,918 | 43.9 |
| Total votes | | 97,815 | 100.0 |
| Republican hold | | | |

=== District 34 ===
First-term incumbent Republican Robbie Brackett had represented the district since 2022.

2024 Florida House of Representatives election, 34th District
| Party | Candidate | Votes | % |
|---|---|---|---|
| Republican | Robert Brackett (incumbent) | 72,940 | 67.3 |
| Democratic | Joseph Alejandro Martinez | 35,398 | 32.7 |
| Total votes | | 108,338 | 100.0 |
| Republican hold | | | |

=== District 35 ===
Democratic incumbent Tom Keen was first elected in a January 2024 special election with 51.3% of the vote.

District 35 Republican primary details

Republican primary
| Party | Candidate | Votes | % |
|---|---|---|---|
| Republican | Erika Booth | 5,749 | 63.3 |
| Republican | Laura Gomez McAdams | 3,329 | 36.7 |
| Total votes | | 9,078 | 100.0 |

==== Predictions ====
| Source | Rating | As of |
|---|---|---|
| CNalysis | Tilt D | October 13, 2024 |

2024 Florida House of Representatives election, 35th District
| Party | Candidate | Votes | % |
|---|---|---|---|
| Republican | Erika Booth | 47,863 | 52.0 |
| Democratic | Tom Keen (incumbent) | 44,209 | 48.0 |
| Total votes | | 92,072 | 100.0 |
| Republican gain from Democratic | | | |

=== District 36 ===
First-term incumbent Republican Rachel Plakon had represented the district since 2022.

==== Predictions ====
| Source | Rating | As of |
|---|---|---|
| CNalysis | Tossup | August 30, 2024 |

2024 Florida House of Representatives election, 36th District
| Party | Candidate | Votes | % |
|---|---|---|---|
| Republican | Rachel Plakon (incumbent) | 47,256 | 53.6 |
| Democratic | Kelley Diona Miller | 40,912 | 46.4 |
| Total votes | | 88,168 | 100.0 |
| Republican hold | | | |

=== District 37 ===
First-term incumbent Republican Susan Plasencia had represented the district since 2022.

==== Endorsements ====
Nate Douglas

U.S. representatives

- Maxwell Frost, U.S. representative from Florida's 10th congressional district (2023–)

State legislators

- Vic Torres

Local officials

- Mike Scott, Orange County commissioner
- Nicole Wilson, Orange County commissioner

==== Predictions ====
| Source | Rating | As of |
|---|---|---|
| CNalysis | Lean D (flip) | September 20, 2024 |

2024 Florida House of Representatives election, 37th District
| Party | Candidate | Votes | % |
|---|---|---|---|
| Republican | Susan Plasencia (incumbent) | 37,682 | 50.3 |
| Democratic | Nate Douglas | 37,239 | 49.7 |
| Total votes | | 74,921 | 100.0 |
| Republican hold | | | |

=== District 38 ===
Third-term incumbent Republican David Smith had represented the district since 2018.

==== Candidates ====
===== Democrats =====
- Sarah Henry, nominee for this district in 2022

==== Endorsements ====
Sarah Henry

State legislators

- Lori Berman, state senator
- LaVon Bracy, state representative
- Anna Eskamani, state representative
- Rita Harris, state representative
- Johanna López, state representative
- Rosalind Osgood, state senator
- Bobby Powell, state senator
- Vic Torres, state senator

Organizations

- Ruth's List

==== Predictions ====
| Source | Rating | As of |
|---|---|---|
| CNalysis | Tilt D (flip) | August 30, 2024 |

2024 Florida House of Representatives election, 38th District
| Party | Candidate | Votes | % |
|---|---|---|---|
| Republican | David Smith (incumbent) | 44,972 | 50.4 |
| Democratic | Sarah Henry | 44,302 | 49.6 |
| Total votes | | 89,274 | 100.0 |
| Republican hold | | | |

=== District 39 ===
First-term incumbent Republican Doug Bankson had represented the district since 2022.

==== Predictions ====
| Source | Rating | As of |
|---|---|---|
| CNalysis | Tossup | August 30, 2024 |

2024 Florida House of Representatives election, 39th District
| Party | Candidate | Votes | % |
|---|---|---|---|
| Republican | Doug Bankson (incumbent) | 46,177 | 52.6 |
| Democratic | Marsha Summersill | 41,692 | 47.4 |
| Total votes | | 87,869 | 100.0 |
| Republican hold | | | |

=== District 40 ===
First-term incumbent Democrat LaVon Bracy Davis had represented the district since 2022.

==== Predictions ====
| Source | Rating | As of |
|---|---|---|
| CNalysis | Safe D | August 30, 2024 |

2024 Florida House of Representatives election, 40th District
| Party | Candidate | Votes | % |
|---|---|---|---|
| Democratic | LaVon Bracy Davis (incumbent) | 42,909 | 67.5 |
| Republican | Belinda Ford | 20,674 | 32.5 |
| Total votes | | 63,583 | 100.0 |
| Democratic hold | | | |

=== District 41 ===
First-term incumbent Democrat Bruce Antone had represented the district since 2022.

District 41 Democratic primary details

Democratic primary
| Party | Candidate | Votes | % |
|---|---|---|---|
| Democratic | Bruce Antone | 5,248 | 63.4 |
| Democratic | Jane’t Buford Johnson | 3,030 | 36.6 |
| Total votes | | 8,278 | 100.0 |

2024 Florida House of Representatives election, 41st District
| Party | Candidate | Votes | % |
|---|---|---|---|
| Democratic | Bruce Antone (incumbent) | Unopposed | |
| Total votes | | N/A | 100.0 |

=== District 42 ===
Third-term incumbent Democrat Anna V. Eskamani had represented the district since 2022, after being redistricted from the 47th district, which she had represented since 2018.

==== Predictions ====
| Source | Rating | As of |
|---|---|---|
| CNalysis | Safe D | August 30, 2024 |

2024 Florida House of Representatives election, 42nd District
| Party | Candidate | Votes | % |
|---|---|---|---|
| Democratic | Anna Eskamani (incumbent) | 58,055 | 58.9 |
| Republican | Gregory Pull | 40,571 | 41.1 |
| Total votes | | 98,626 | 100.0 |
| Democratic hold | | | |

=== District 43 ===
First-term incumbent Democrat Johanna López had represented the distinct since 2022.

==== Predictions ====
| Source | Rating | As of |
|---|---|---|
| CNalysis | Safe D | August 30, 2024 |

2024 Florida House of Representatives election, 43rd District
| Party | Candidate | Votes | % |
|---|---|---|---|
| Democratic | Johanna López (incumbent) | 35,509 | 57.3 |
| Republican | Joseph “Joe” Melendez | 26,413 | 42.7 |
| Total votes | | 61,922 | 100.0 |
| Democratic hold | | | |

=== District 44 ===
First-term incumbent Democrat Rita Harris had represented the district since 2022.

District 44 Democratic primary details

Democratic primary
| Party | Candidate | Votes | % |
|---|---|---|---|
| Democratic | Jennifer “Rita” Harris | 7,335 | 65.0 |
| Democratic | Daisy Morales | 3,949 | 35.0 |
| Total votes | | 11,284 | 100.0 |

2024 Florida House of Representatives election, 44th District
| Party | Candidate | Votes | % |
|---|---|---|---|
| Democratic | Rita Harris (incumbent) | Unopposed | |
| Total votes | | N/A | 100.0 |

=== District 45 ===
First-term incumbent Republican Carolina Amesty had represented the district since 2022.

==== Endorsements ====
Leonard K. Spencer

State legislators

- Fentrice Driskell, minority leader of the Florida House of Representatives (2022–present) from the 67th district (2018–present)

==== Predictions ====
| Source | Rating | As of |
|---|---|---|
| CNalysis | Likely D (flip) | August 30, 2024 |

2024 Florida House of Representatives election, 45th District
| Party | Candidate | Votes | % |
|---|---|---|---|
| Democratic | Leonard Spencer | 48,435 | 50.9 |
| Republican | Carolina Amesty (incumbent) | 46,809 | 49.1 |
| Total votes | | 95,244 | 100.0 |
| Democratic gain from Republican | | | |

=== District 46 ===
Second-term incumbent Democrat Kristen Arrington had represented the district since 2022, after being redistricted from the 43rd district, which she had represented since 2020. She retired to successfully run for State Senate.

District 46 Democratic primary details

Democratic primary
| Party | Candidate | Votes | % |
|---|---|---|---|
| Democratic | Jose Alverez | 2,685 | 39.4 |
| Democratic | Robert LeWayne Johnson | 1,745 | 25.6 |
| Democratic | Jacqueline Centeno | 1,257 | 18.4 |
| Democratic | Vanessa Alvarez | 1,133 | 16.6 |
| Total votes | | 6,820 | 100.0 |

District 46 Republican primary details

Republican primary
| Party | Candidate | Votes | % |
|---|---|---|---|
| Republican | Michael Cruz | 1,995 | 59.9 |
| Republican | Christian De La torre | 1,334 | 40.1 |
| Total votes | | 3,329 | 100.0 |

==== Predictions ====
| Source | Rating | As of |
|---|---|---|
| CNalysis | Safe D | August 30, 2024 |

2024 Florida House of Representatives election, 46th District
| Party | Candidate | Votes | % |
|---|---|---|---|
| Democratic | Jose Alverez | 33,142 | 57.0 |
| Republican | Michael Cruz | 23,016 | 39.6 |
| Independent | Ivan A. Rivera | 1,968 | 3.4 |
| Total votes | | 58,126 | 100.0 |
| Democratic hold | | | |

=== District 47 ===
First-term incumbent Republican Paula Stark had represented the district since 2022.

District 47 Democratic primary details

Democratic primary
| Party | Candidate | Votes | % |
|---|---|---|---|
| Democratic | Maria Revelles | 2,795 | 36.5 |
| Democratic | Andrew Jeng | 2,497 | 32.6 |
| Democratic | Anthony Nieves | 2,368 | 30.9 |
| Total votes | | 7,660 | 100.0 |

==== Predictions ====
| Source | Rating | As of |
|---|---|---|
| CNalysis | Tilt D (flip) | September 20, 2024 |

2024 Florida House of Representatives election, 47th District
| Party | Candidate | Votes | % |
|---|---|---|---|
| Republican | Paula Stark (incumbent) | 39,380 | 50.8 |
| Democratic | Maria Revelles | 38,134 | 49.2 |
| Total votes | | 77,514 | 100.0 |
| Republican hold | | | |

=== District 48 ===
Fourth-term incumbent Republican Sam Killebrew had represented the district since 2022, after being redistricted from the 41st district, which he had represented since 2016. He was term-limited and could not seek re-election.

District 48 Republican primary details

==== Candidates ====
- Jon Albert, mayor of Frostproof
- Jerry Carter, former Polk County commissioner and candidate for state representative in 2002
- Chad Davis, senior legislative assistant to former state senator Kelli Stargel
- Kenny Hartpence, businessman and candidate for Florida's 18th congressional district in 2022 (withdrew)
- Deborah Owens, retired commercial airline pilot
- Amilee Stuckey, attorney
- Benny Valentin, clinical psychologist
- Lynn Wilson, CPA and former Polk County school board member (withdrew)

Republican primary
| Party | Candidate | Votes | % |
|---|---|---|---|
| Republican | Jon Albert | 3,883 | 35.0 |
| Republican | Jerry Carter | 2,727 | 24.6 |
| Republican | Chad Davis | 2,123 | 19.2 |
| Republican | Amilee Marie Stuckey | 1,086 | 9.8 |
| Republican | Deborah “Debbie” Owens | 984 | 8.9 |
| Republican | Benny Valentin | 279 | 2.5 |
| Total votes | | 11,082 | 100.0 |

2024 Florida House of Representatives election, 48th District
| Party | Candidate | Votes | % |
|---|---|---|---|
| Republican | Jon Albert | 49,893 | 57.9 |
| Democratic | John Hill | 36,297 | 42.1 |
| Total votes | | 86,190 | 100.0 |
| Republican hold | | | |

=== District 49 ===
Third-term incumbent Republican Melony Bell had represented the district since 2022, after being redistricted from the 56th district, which she had represented since 2018. She retired to successfully run for Polk County supervisor of elections.

District 49 Republican primary details

==== Candidates ====
- Jennifer Jonsson, businesswoman
- Heather McArthur, mediator and businesswoman
- Shawn McDonough, business owner

Republican primary
| Party | Candidate | Votes | % |
|---|---|---|---|
| Republican | Jennifer Kincart Jonsson | 5,950 | 50.6 |
| Republican | Shawn Curtis McDonough | 2,709 | 23.1 |
| Republican | Heather McArthur | 1,751 | 14.9 |
| Republican | Randy Wilkinson | 1,338 | 11.4 |
| Total votes | | 11,748 | 100.0 |

2024 Florida House of Representatives election, 49th District
| Party | Candidate | Votes | % |
|---|---|---|---|
| Republican | Jennifer Kincart Jonsson | 53,388 | 67.1 |
| Democratic | Ashley Elizabeth Herrmann | 26,217 | 32.9 |
| Total votes | | 79,605 | 100.0 |
| Republican hold | | | |

=== District 50 ===
First-term incumbent Republican Jennifer Canady had represented the district since 2022.

2024 Florida House of Representatives election, 50th District
| Party | Candidate | Votes | % |
|---|---|---|---|
| Republican | Jennifer Canady (incumbent) | 49,635 | 62.6 |
| Democratic | Bonnie Patterson-James | 29,627 | 37.4 |
| Total votes | | 79,262 | 100.0 |
| Republican hold | | | |

=== District 51 ===
Third-term incumbent Republican Josie Tomkow had represented the district since 2022, after being redistricted from the 39th district, which she had represented since winning a special election in 2018.

==== Candidates ====
===== Democratic =====
- Octavio Eduardo Hernandez

2024 Florida House of Representatives election, 51st District
| Party | Candidate | Votes | % |
|---|---|---|---|
| Republican | Josie Tomkow (incumbent) | 51,050 | 56.9 |
| Democratic | Octavio E. Hernandez | 38,683 | 43.1 |
| Total votes | | 89,733 | 100.0 |
| Republican hold | | | |

=== District 52 ===
First-term incumbent Republican John Temple had represented the district since 2022.

2024 Florida House of Representatives election, 52nd District
| Party | Candidate | Votes | % |
|---|---|---|---|
| Republican | John Temple (incumbent) | 92,690 | 72.0 |
| Democratic | Ash Marwah | 35,972 | 28.0 |
| Total votes | | 128,662 | 100.0 |
| Republican hold | | | |

=== District 53 ===
First-term incumbent Republican Jeff Holcomb had represented the district since 2022.

2024 Florida House of Representatives election, 53rd District
| Party | Candidate | Votes | % |
|---|---|---|---|
| Republican | Jeff Holcomb (incumbent) | 66,146 | 69.0 |
| Democratic | Keith G. Laufenberg | 29,682 | 31.0 |
| Total votes | | 95,828 | 100.0 |
| Republican hold | | | |

=== District 54 ===
Second-term incumbent Republican Randy Maggard had represented the district since 2022, after being redistricted from the 38th district, which he had represented after winning a special election in 2019.

2024 Florida House of Representatives election, 54th District
| Party | Candidate | Votes | % |
|---|---|---|---|
| Republican | Randy Maggard (incumbent) | 60,923 | 60.1 |
| Democratic | Karl Cieslak | 40,434 | 39.9 |
| Total votes | | 101,357 | 100.0 |
| Republican hold | | | |

=== District 55 ===
First-term incumbent Republican Kevin Steele had represented the district since 2022.

2024 Florida House of Representatives election, 55th District
| Party | Candidate | Votes | % |
|---|---|---|---|
| Republican | Kevin Steele (incumbent) | 69,763 | 64.2 |
| Democratic | Judy Freiberg | 38,853 | 35.8 |
| Write-in | CJ Hacker | 60 | 0.1 |
| Total votes | | 108,676 | 100.0 |
| Republican hold | | | |

=== District 56 ===
First-term incumbent Republican Brad Yeager had represented the district since 2022.

District 56 Republican primary details

==== Candidates ====
- Kirk Phillips
- Brad Yeager

==== Endorsements ====
Brad Yeager

Statewide officials

- Ron DeSantis, governor of Florida

Republican primary
| Party | Candidate | Votes | % |
|---|---|---|---|
| Republican | Brad Yeager (incumbent) | 6,889 | 79.4 |
| Republican | Kirk Phillips | 1,783 | 20.6 |
| Total votes | | 8,672 | 100.0 |

===== Democrats =====
- William Pura

2024 Florida House of Representatives election, 56th District
| Party | Candidate | Votes | % |
|---|---|---|---|
| Republican | Brad Yeager (incumbent) | 50,279 | 65.1 |
| Democratic | William "Willie" Pura | 26,904 | 34.9 |
| Total votes | | 77,183 | 100.0 |
| Republican hold | | | |

=== District 57 ===
First-term incumbent Republican Adam Anderson had represented the district since 2022.

2024 Florida House of Representatives election, 57th District
| Party | Candidate | Votes | % |
|---|---|---|---|
| Republican | Adam C. Anderson (incumbent) | 61,669 | 58.8 |
| Democratic | Kelly Johnson | 40,503 | 38.6 |
| Independent | Robert “Bob” Arthur Larrivee | 2,675 | 2.6 |
| Total votes | | 104,847 | 100.0 |
| Republican hold | | | |

=== District 58 ===
First-term incumbent Republican Kim Berfield had represented the district since 2022.

2024 Florida House of Representatives election, 58th District
| Party | Candidate | Votes | % |
|---|---|---|---|
| Republican | Kim Berfield (incumbent) | 52,103 | 57.6 |
| Democratic | Bryan Beckman | 38,283 | 42.4 |
| Total votes | | 90,386 | 100.0 |
| Republican hold | | | |

=== District 59 ===
First-term incumbent Republican Berny Jacques had represented the district since 2022.

2024 Florida House of Representatives election, 59th District
| Party | Candidate | Votes | % |
|---|---|---|---|
| Republican | Berny Jacques (incumbent) | 50,520 | 58.7 |
| Democratic | Dawn Douglas | 35,577 | 41.3 |
| Total votes | | 86,097 | 100.0 |
| Republican hold | | | |

=== District 60 ===
First-term incumbent Democrat Lindsay Cross had represented the district since 2022.

==== Candidates ====
===== Republicans =====
- Ed Montanari, St. Petersburg city councilman

==== Endorsements ====
Linsday Cross

Organizations

- EMILY's List
Ed Montanari

Local officials

- Rick Baker, former mayor of St. Petersburg (2001–2010)
- Jim Coats, former Pinellas County sheriff
- Bob Gualtieri, Pinellas County sheriff

2024 Florida House of Representatives election, 60th District
| Party | Candidate | Votes | % |
|---|---|---|---|
| Democratic | Lindsay Cross (incumbent) | 47,698 | 53.6 |
| Republican | Ed Montanari | 41,209 | 46.4 |
| Total votes | | 88,907 | 100.0 |
| Democratic hold | | | |

=== District 61 ===
Second-term incumbent Republican Linda Chaney had represented the district since 2022, after being redistricted from the 69th district, which she had represented since 2020.

2024 Florida House of Representatives election, 61st District
| Party | Candidate | Votes | % |
|---|---|---|---|
| Republican | Linda Chaney (incumbent) | 53,602 | 56.2 |
| Democratic | Nathan Bruemmer | 41,722 | 43.8 |
| Total votes | | 95,324 | 100.0 |
| Republican hold | | | |

=== District 62 ===
Second-term incumbent Democrat Michele Rayner had represented the district since 2022, after being redistricted from the 70th district, which she had represented since 2020.

2024 Florida House of Representatives election, 62nd District
| Party | Candidate | Votes | % |
|---|---|---|---|
| Democratic | Michele Rayner (incumbent) | 48,205 | 68.7 |
| Republican | Nelson Amador | 22,009 | 31.3 |
| Total votes | | 70,214 | 100.0 |
| Democratic hold | | | |

=== District 63 ===
Third-term incumbent Democrat Dianne Hart had represented the district since 2022, after being redistricted from the 61st district, which she had represented since 2018.

2024 Florida House of Representatives election, 63rd District
| Party | Candidate | Votes | % |
|---|---|---|---|
| Democratic | Dianne Hart (incumbent) | 40,078 | 72.9 |
| Republican | Tim Driver | 14,883 | 27.1 |
| Total votes | | 54,961 | 100.0 |
| Democratic hold | | | |

=== District 64 ===
Third-term incumbent Democrat Susan Valdes had represented the district since 2022, after being redistricted from the 62nd district, which she had represented since 2018.

On December 9, 2024, Valdes switched to the Republican party, only days after she lost a bid for Hillsborough County Democratic Party chairman.

2024 Florida House of Representatives election, 64th District
| Party | Candidate | Votes | % |
|---|---|---|---|
| Democratic | Susan Valdes (incumbent) | 31,511 | 52.4 |
| Republican | Maura Cruz Lanz | 28,636 | 47.6 |
| Total votes | | 60,147 | 100.0 |
| Democratic hold | | | |

=== District 65 ===
First-term incumbent Republican Karen Gonzalez Pittman had represented the district since 2022.

District 65 Democratic primary details

Democratic primary
| Party | Candidate | Votes | % |
|---|---|---|---|
| Democratic | Ashley Brundage | 8,106 | 81.1 |
| Democratic | Nathan Albert Kuipers | 1,883 | 18.9 |
| Total votes | | 9,989 | 100.0 |

2024 Florida House of Representatives election, 65th District
| Party | Candidate | Votes | % |
|---|---|---|---|
| Republican | Karen Gonzalez Pittman (incumbent) | 53,824 | 57.2 |
| Democratic | Ashley Brundage | 40,198 | 42.8 |
| Total votes | | 94,022 | 100.0 |
| Republican hold | | | |

=== District 66 ===
Second-term incumbent Republican Traci Koster had represented the district since 2022, after being redistricted from the 64th district, which she had represented since 2020.

2024 Florida House of Representatives election, 66th District
| Party | Candidate | Votes | % |
|---|---|---|---|
| Republican | Traci Koster (incumbent) | 55,211 | 58.3 |
| Democratic | Nick Clemente | 39,534 | 41.7 |
| Total votes | | 94,745 | 100.0 |
| Republican hold | | | |

=== District 67 ===
Third-term incumbent Democrat Fentrice Driskell, the House minority leader, had represented the district since 2018.

District 67 Republican primary details

Republican primary
| Party | Candidate | Votes | % |
|---|---|---|---|
| Republican | Ronrico “Rico” Smith | 3,212 | 56.5 |
| Republican | Lisette Bonano | 2,470 | 43.5 |
| Total votes | | 5,682 | |

2024 Florida House of Representatives election, 67th District
| Party | Candidate | Votes | % |
|---|---|---|---|
| Democratic | Fentrice Driskell (incumbent) | 36,182 | 54.7 |
| Republican | Ronrico “Rico” Smith | 30,023 | 45.3 |
| Total votes | | 66,205 | 100.0 |
| Democratic hold | | | |

=== District 68 ===
Third-term incumbent Republican Lawrence McClure had represented the district since 2022, after being redistricted from the 58th district, which he had represented since winning a special election in 2017.

2024 Florida House of Representatives election, 68th District
| Party | Candidate | Votes | % |
|---|---|---|---|
| Republican | Lawrence McClure (incumbent) | 50,568 | 63.0 |
| Democratic | Lisa Carpus | 27,230 | 33.9 |
| Independent | Tyrell Hicks | 2,427 | 3.0 |
| Total votes | | 80,225 | 100.0 |
| Republican hold | | | |

=== District 69 ===
First-term incumbent Danny Alvarez had represented the district since 2022.

2024 Florida House of Representatives election, 69th District
| Party | Candidate | Votes | % |
|---|---|---|---|
| Republican | Danny Alvarez (incumbent) | 50,383 | 58.2 |
| Democratic | Bobby Kachelries | 36,136 | 41.8 |
| Total votes | | 86,519 | 100.0 |
| Republican hold | | | |

=== District 70 ===
Third-term incumbent Republican Mike Beltran had represented the 70th district since 2022, after being redistricted from the 57th district, which he had represented since 2018. He retired.

2024 Florida House of Representatives election, 70th District
| Party | Candidate | Votes | % |
|---|---|---|---|
| Republican | Michael Owen | 65,037 | 58.8 |
| Democratic | Luther Keith Wilkins | 45,620 | 41.2 |
| Total votes | | 110,657 | 100.0 |
| Republican hold | | | |

=== District 71 ===
Third-term incumbent Republican Will Robinson had represented the district since 2018.

2024 Florida House of Representatives election, 71st District
| Party | Candidate | Votes | % |
|---|---|---|---|
| Republican | Will Robinson (incumbent) | 44,548 | 59.6 |
| Democratic | Adriaan J. DeVilliers | 30,241 | 40.4 |
| Total votes | | 74,789 | 100.0 |
| Republican hold | | | |

=== District 72 ===
The district was vacant after third-term incumbent Republican Tommy Gregory resigned on June 30 after being chosen as the next president of State College of Florida, Manatee–Sarasota.

District 72 Republican primary details

==== Candidates ====
- Bill Conerly, businessman
- Alyssa Gay, businesswoman
- Richard Green, attorney
- Rich Tatem, Manatee County school board member

==== Polling ====
| Poll source | Date(s) administered | Sample size | Margin of error | Bill Conerly | Alyssa Gay | Richard Green | Rich Tatem | Undecided |
|---|---|---|---|---|---|---|---|---|
| M3 Strategies | July 30–31, 2024 | 463 (LV) | ± 4.55% | 17% | 14% | 7% | 11% | 51% |

Republican primary
| Party | Candidate | Votes | % |
|---|---|---|---|
| Republican | William “Bill” Conerly | 6,182 | 31.1 |
| Republican | Rich Tatem | 5,597 | 28.1 |
| Republican | Alyssa Gay | 4,478 | 22.5 |
| Republican | Richard P. Green | 3,651 | 18.3 |
| Total votes | | 19,908 | 100.0 |

2024 Florida House of Representatives election, 72nd District
| Party | Candidate | Votes | % |
|---|---|---|---|
| Republican | Bill Conerly | 71,463 | 64.7 |
| Democratic | Lesa Miller | 39,013 | 35.3 |
| Total votes | | 110,476 | 100.0 |
| Republican hold | | | |

=== District 73 ===
Second-term incumbent Republican Fiona McFarland had represented the district since 2022, after being redistricted from the 72nd district, which she had represented since 2020.

2024 Florida House of Representatives election, 73rd District
| Party | Candidate | Votes | % |
|---|---|---|---|
| Republican | Fiona McFarland (incumbent) | 61,212 | 56.3 |
| Democratic | Derek Reich | 47,548 | 43.7 |
| Total votes | | 108,760 | 100.0 |
| Republican hold | | | |

=== District 74 ===
Third-term incumbent Republican James Buchanan had represented the district since 2018.

District 74 Republican primary details

==== Candidates ====
- Michele Pozzie, education activist

==== Endorsements ====
James Buchanan

Statewide officials

- Ron DeSantis, governor of Florida

Republican primary
| Party | Candidate | Votes | % |
|---|---|---|---|
| Republican | James Buchanan (incumbent) | 15,901 | 73.7 |
| Republican | Michelle Pozzie | 5,687 | 26.3 |
| Total votes | | 21,588 | 100.0 |

===== Democrat Primary =====
- Nancy Simpson, urban planning consultant

2024 Florida House of Representatives election, 74th District
| Party | Candidate | Votes | % |
|---|---|---|---|
| Republican | James Buchanan (incumbent) | 74,060 | 64.6 |
| Democratic | Nancy M. H. Simpson | 40,516 | 35.4 |
| Total votes | | 114,576 | 100.0 |
| Republican hold | | | |

=== District 75 ===
Fourth-term incumbent Republican Michael J. Grant, the House majority leader, had represented the district since 2016. He was term-limited and could not seek re-election.

==== Candidates ====
===== Republicans =====
- Danny Nix, realtor

==== Endorsements ====
Danny Nix

State legislators

- Michael J. Grant, incumbent representative

2024 Florida House of Representatives election, 75th District
| Party | Candidate | Votes | % |
|---|---|---|---|
| Republican | Danny Nix | 77,489 | 66.3 |
| Democratic | Tony Dunbar | 39,324 | 33.7 |
| Total votes | | 116,813 | 100.0 |
| Republican hold | | | |

=== District 76 ===
Third-term incumbent Republican Spencer Roach had represented the district since 2022, after being redistricted from the 79th district, which he had represented since 2018. He retired.

District 76 Republican primary details

==== Candidates ====
- Vanessa Oliver, businesswoman

Republican primary
| Party | Candidate | Votes | % |
|---|---|---|---|
| Republican | Vanessa Oliver | 13,345 | 71.7 |
| Republican | Steven Ceracche | 5,261 | 28.3 |
| Total votes | | 18,606 | 100.0 |

2024 Florida House of Representatives election, 76th District
| Party | Candidate | Votes | % |
|---|---|---|---|
| Republican | Vanessa Oliver | 70,510 | 70.5 |
| Democratic | Jim Blue | 29,492 | 29.5 |
| Total votes | | 100,002 | 100.0 |
| Republican hold | | | |

=== District 77 ===
First-term incumbent Republican Tiffany Esposito had represented the district since 2022.

2024 Florida House of Representatives election, 77th District
| Party | Candidate | Votes | % |
|---|---|---|---|
| Republican | Tiffany Esposito (incumbent) | 49,355 | 63.9 |
| Democratic | Cornelius Fowler | 26,139 | 33.8 |
| Libertarian | Joshua Krakow | 1,729 | 2.2 |
| Total votes | | 77,223 | 100.0 |
| Republican hold | | | |

=== District 78 ===
Second-term incumbent Republican Jenna Persons had represented the district since 2020.

==== Endorsements ====
Jenna Persons

Statewide officials

- Ron DeSantis, governor of Florida

2024 Florida House of Representatives election, 78th District
| Party | Candidate | Votes | % |
|---|---|---|---|
| Republican | Jenna Persons-Mulicka (incumbent) | 49,129 | 59.9 |
| Democratic | Howard Sapp | 32,908 | 40.1 |
| Total votes | | 82,030 | 100.0 |
| Republican hold | | | |

=== District 79 ===
Second-term incumbent Republican Mike Giallombardo had represented the district since 2022, after being redistricted from the 77th district, which he had represented since 2020.

2024 Florida House of Representatives election, 79th District
| Party | Candidate | Votes | % |
|---|---|---|---|
| Republican | Mike Giallombardo (incumbent) | 66,569 | 68.8 |
| Democratic | Denise McCleary | 30,130 | 31.2 |
| Total votes | | 96,699 | 100.0 |
| Republican hold | | | |

=== District 80 ===
Second-term incumbent Republican Adam Botana had represented the district since 2022, after being redistricted from the 76th district, which he had represented since 2020.

2024 Florida House of Representatives election, 80th District
| Party | Candidate | Votes | % |
|---|---|---|---|
| Republican | Adam Botana (incumbent) | 75,850 | 69.1 |
| Democratic | Mitchel Schlayer | 33,819 | 30.8 |
| Write-in | Patrick Post | 67 | 0.1 |
| Total votes | | 109,736 | 100.0 |
| Republican hold | | | |

=== District 81 ===
Fourth-term incumbent Republican Bob Rommel had represented the district since 2022, after being redistricted from the 106th district, which he had represented since 2016. He was term-limited and could not seek re-election.

District 81 Republican primary details

==== Candidates ====
- Yvette Benarroch, chair of the Moms for Liberty Collier County chapter
- Greg Folley, Marco Island city councilman

==== Endorsements ====
Yvette Benarroch

Federal officials

- Byron Donalds, U.S. representative for Florida's 21st congressional district (2021–)
- Marco Rubio, U.S. senator from Florida (2011–)
- Rick Scott, U.S. senator from Florida (2019–)

Individuals

- Erika Donalds, school choice advocate
Greg Folley

Statewide officials

- Jimmy Patronis, chief financial officer of Florida

Individuals

- Thomas Homan, former acting director of U.S. Immigration and Customs Enforcement (2017–2018)
- Ed Rapp, former chief financial officer of Caterpillar

Republican primary
| Party | Candidate | Votes | % |
|---|---|---|---|
| Republican | Yvette Benarroch | 13,051 | 56.3 |
| Republican | Greg Folley | 10,131 | 43.7 |
| Total votes | | 23,182 | 100.0 |

2024 Florida House of Representatives election, 81st District
| Party | Candidate | Votes | % |
|---|---|---|---|
| Republican | Yvette Benarroch | 73,942 | 68.1 |
| Democratic | Charles Robert “Chuck” Work | 34,674 | 31.9 |
| Total votes | | 108,616 | 100.0 |
| Republican hold | | | |

=== District 82 ===
Second-term incumbent Republican Lauren Melo had represented the district since 2022, after being redistricted from the 80th district, which she had represented since 2020.

2024 Florida House of Representatives election, 82nd District
| Party | Candidate | Votes | % |
|---|---|---|---|
| Republican | Lauren Uhlich Melo (incumbent) | 55,819 | 69.7 |
| Democratic | Arthur D. Oslund | 24,214 | 30.3 |
| Total votes | | 80,033 | 100.0 |
| Republican hold | | | |

=== District 83 ===
Second-term incumbent Republican Kaylee Tuck had represented the district since 2022, after being redistricted from the 55th district, which she had represented since 2020.

2024 Florida House of Representatives election, 83rd District
| Party | Candidate | Votes | % |
|---|---|---|---|
| Republican | Kaylee Tuck (incumbent) | 58,982 | 74.6 |
| Democratic | Danika Fornear | 20,061 | 25.4 |
| Total votes | | 79,043 | 100.0 |
| Republican hold | | | |

=== District 84 ===
Second-term incumbent Republican Dana Trabulsy had represented the district since 2020.

2024 Florida House of Representatives election, 84th District
| Party | Candidate | Votes | % |
|---|---|---|---|
| Republican | Dana Trabulsy (incumbent) | 53,724 | 58.0 |
| Democratic | Andi Poli | 38,844 | 42.0 |
| Total votes | | 92,568 | 100.0 |
| Republican hold | | | |

=== District 85 ===
Third-term incumbent Republican Toby Overdorf had represented the district since 2022, after being redistricted from the 83rd district, which he had represented since 2018.

2024 Florida House of Representatives election, 85th District
| Party | Candidate | Votes | % |
|---|---|---|---|
| Republican | Toby Overdorf (incumbent) | 63,276 | 57.2 |
| Democratic | Lisa Marie Stortstrom | 47,433 | 42.8 |
| Total votes | | 110,709 | 100.0 |
| Republican hold | | | |

=== District 86 ===
Second-term incumbent Republican John Snyder had represented the district since 2022, after being redistricted from the 82nd district, which he had represented since 2020.

2024 Florida House of Representatives election, 86th District
| Party | Candidate | Votes | % |
|---|---|---|---|
| Republican | John Snyder (incumbent) | 70,398 | 68.1 |
| Democratic | Alberto Hernandez | 33,015 | 31.9 |
| Total votes | | 103,413 | 100.0 |
| Republican hold | | | |

=== District 87 ===
Third-term incumbent Republican Mike Caruso had represented the district since 2022, after being redistricted from the 89th district, which he had represented since 2018.

2024 Florida House of Representatives election, 87th District
| Party | Candidate | Votes | % |
|---|---|---|---|
| Republican | Mike Caruso (incumbent) | 57,471 | 59.5 |
| Democratic | Sienna Osta | 39,151 | 40.5 |
| Total votes | | 96,622 | 100.0 |
| Republican hold | | | |

=== District 88 ===
Second-term incumbent Democratic Jervonte Edmonds had represented the district since winning a special election in 2022.

2024 Florida House of Representatives election, 88th District
| Party | Candidate | Votes | % |
|---|---|---|---|
| Democratic | Jervonte Edmonds (incumbent) | Unopposed | |
| Total votes | | N/A | 100.0 |

=== District 89 ===
Fourth-term incumbent Democrat David Silvers had represented the district since 2022, after being redistricted from the 87th district, which he had represented since 2016. He was term-limited and could not seek re-election.

District 89 Democratic primary details

==== Candidates ====
- Destinie Sutton, former prosecutor
- Debra Tendrich, nonprofit founder

==== Endorsements ====
Destinie Sutton

U.S. representatives

- Sheila Cherfilus-McCormick, U.S. representative from Florida's 20th congressional district

State legislators

- Ashley Gantt, state representative
- Joe Gibbons, former state representative (2006–2014)
- Addie Greene, former state representative (1992–2000)

Local officials

- Keith Babbs, mayor of Pahokee
- Keith James, mayor of West Palm Beach
- Joe Kyles, mayor of South Bay
- Melissa McKinlay, former Palm Beach County commissioner
- Steve Wilson, mayor of Belle Glade

Organizations

- Fraternal Order of Police
- NOW
Debra Tendrich

State legislators

- Joseph Casello, state representative
- Dianne Hart, state representative
- Tina Polsky, state senator
- Barry Silver, former state representative

Local officials

- Mack Bernarnd, Palm Beach County commissioner

Democratic primary
| Party | Candidate | Votes | % |
|---|---|---|---|
| Democratic | Debra Tendrich | 3,422 | 59.0 |
| Democratic | Destinie Baker Sutton | 2,381 | 41.0 |
| Total votes | | 5,803 | 100.0 |

2024 Florida House of Representatives election, 89th District
| Party | Candidate | Votes | % |
|---|---|---|---|
| Democratic | Debra Tendrich | 26,755 | 51.3 |
| Republican | Daniel Zapata | 25,421 | 48.7 |
| Total votes | | 52,176 | 100.0 |
| Democratic hold | | | |

=== District 90 ===
Third-term incumbent Democratic Joseph Casello had represented the district since 2018.

==== Candidates ====
===== Republicans =====
- Nicolas Giacolone, university student
- William Reicherter, real estate agent and nominee for Florida's 30th State Senate district in 2022

2024 Florida House of Representatives election, 90th District
| Party | Candidate | Votes | % |
|---|---|---|---|
| Democratic | Joe Casello (incumbent) | 47,962 | 56.1 |
| Republican | Bill Reicherter | 37,564 | 43.9 |
| Total votes | | 85,526 | 100.0 |
| Democratic hold | | | |

=== District 91 ===
First-term incumbent Republican Peggy Gossett-Seidman had represented the district since 2022.

==== Candidates ====
===== Democrats =====
- Michaelangelo Hamilton, insurance agent
- Jay Shooster, lawyer

==== Endorsements ====
Jay Shooster

U.S. representatives

- Lois Frankel, U.S. representative from Florida's 22nd congressional district (Note: Numbered as the 21st from 2017 to 2023) (2013–)
- Jared Moskowitz, U.S. representative from Florida's 23rd congressional district (2023–)

State legislators

- Lori Berman, state senator (2018–)
- Joseph Casello, state representative (2018–)
- Tina Polsky, state senator (2020–)
- Kelly Skidmore, state representative (2020–)

2024 Florida House of Representatives election, 91st District
| Party | Candidate | Votes | % |
|---|---|---|---|
| Republican | Peggy Gossett-Seidman (incumbent) | 52,858 | 54.5 |
| Democratic | Jay Shooster | 44,051 | 45.5 |
| Total votes | | 96,909 | 100.0 |
| Republican hold | | | |

=== District 92 ===
Second-term incumbent Democrat Kelly Skidmore had represented the district since 2022, after being redistricted from the 81st district, which she had represented since 2020. Skidmore was re-elected unopposed after no other candidate filed before the primary election.

2024 Florida House of Representatives election, 92nd District
| Party | Candidate | Votes | % |
|---|---|---|---|
| Democratic | Kelly Skidmore (incumbent) | Unopposed | |
| Total votes | | N/A | 100.0 |

=== District 93 ===
First-term incumbent Democrat Katherine Waldron had represented the district since 2022.

==== Candidates ====
===== Republicans =====
- Brandon Cabrera, businessman
- Anne Gerwig, Wellington mayor
- Chris Mitchell, bank branch manager

==== Endorsements ====
Brandon Cabrera

Local officials

- Michael Barnett, Palm Beach County commissioner
Katherine Waldron

Organizations

- EMILY's List

2024 Florida House of Representatives election, 93rd District
| Party | Candidate | Votes | % |
|---|---|---|---|
| Republican | Anne Gerwig | 45,953 | 50.2 |
| Democratic | Katherine Waldron (incumbent) | 45,605 | 49.8 |
| Total votes | | 91,558 | 100.0 |
| Republican gain from Democratic | | | |

=== District 94 ===
Fourth-term incumbent Republican Rick Roth had represented the district since 2022, after being redistricted from the 85th district, which he had represented since 2016. He was term-limited and could not seek re-election.

District 94 Republican primary details

==== Candidates ====
- Christian Acosta, Palm Beach State College engineering professor
- Anthony Aguirre, businessman
- Jon Carter, Roth's former campaign manager
- Gabrielle Fox, psychologist
- Megan Weinberger, animal sanctuary owner

==== Endorsements ====
Anthony Aguirre

Statewide officials

- Ron DeSantis, governor of Florida
Jon Carter

Local officials

- Sara Baxter, Palm Beach County commissioner
- Juan Gonzalez, Pahokee city commissioner
- John Maples, Lake Clarke Shores councilman
- Sara Perez, Pahokee city commissioner
- Robert Shorr, Loxahatchee vice mayor
- Tom Turkin, Boynton Beach vice mayor
Megan Weinberger

Federal officials

- Donald Trump, former president of the United States (2017–2021)

U.S. representatives

- Matt Gaetz, U.S. representative from Florida's 1st congressional district

State legislators

- Mike Caruso, state representative
- Alina Garcia, state representative

Labor unions

- Florida Fraternal Order of Police
- Florida Police Benevolent Association
- Palm Beach County Police Benevolent Association

Republican primary
| Party | Candidate | Votes | % |
|---|---|---|---|
| Republican | Meg Weinberger | 5,669 | 47.7 |
| Republican | Anthony Aguirre | 3,301 | 27.8 |
| Republican | Christian F. Acosta | 1,978 | 16.6 |
| Republican | Gabrielle M. Fox | 936 | 7.9 |
| Total votes | | 11,884 | 100.0 |

==== Democratic primary ====
===== Nominee =====
- Rachelle Litt, former Palm Beach Gardens mayor

2024 Florida House of Representatives election, 94th District
| Party | Candidate | Votes | % |
|---|---|---|---|
| Republican | Meg Weinberger (incumbent) | 53,072 | 55.1 |
| Democratic | Rachelle Litt | 43,277 | 44.9 |
| Total votes | | 96,349 | 100.0 |
| Republican hold | | | |

=== District 95 ===
Second-term incumbent Democratic Christine Hunschofsky had represented the district since 2022, after being redistricted from the 96th district, which she had represented since 2020. She was re-elected unopposed after no other candidate filed before the primary election.

2024 Florida House of Representatives election, 95th District
| Party | Candidate | Votes | % |
|---|---|---|---|
| Democratic | Christine Hunschofsky (incumbent) | Unopposed | |
| Total votes | | N/A | 100.0 |

=== District 96 ===
Second-term incumbent Democrat Dan Daley had represented the district since 2022, after being redistricted from the 97th district, which he had represented since winning a special election in 2019. He was re-elected unopposed after no other candidate filed before the primary election.

2024 Florida House of Representatives election, 96th District
| Party | Candidate | Votes | % |
|---|---|---|---|
| Democratic | Dan Daley (incumbent) | Unopposed | |
| Total votes | | N/A | 100.0 |

=== District 97 ===
First-term incumbent Lisa Dunkley had represented the district since 2022. She was re-elected unopposed after no other candidate filed before the primary election.

2024 Florida House of Representatives election, 97th District
| Party | Candidate | Votes | % |
|---|---|---|---|
| Democratic | Lisa Dunkley (incumbent) | Unopposed | |
| Total votes | | N/A | 100.0 |

=== District 98 ===
Fourth-term incumbent Democrat Patricia Hawkins-Williams had represented the district since 2022, after being redistricted from the 92nd district, which she had represented since 2016. She was term-limited and could not seek re-election.

District 98 Democratic primary details

Democratic primary
| Party | Candidate | Votes | % |
|---|---|---|---|
| Democratic | Mitch Rosenwald | 5,641 | 37.2 |
| Democratic | Emily Rodrigues | 4,360 | 28.7 |
| Democratic | Keith Abel | 3,153 | 20.8 |
| Democratic | Shelton A. Pooler | 2,013 | 13.3 |
| Total votes | | 15,167 | 100.0 |

2024 Florida House of Representatives election, 98th District
| Party | Candidate | Votes | % |
|---|---|---|---|
| Democratic | Mitch Rosenwald | Unopposed | |
| Total votes | | N/A | 100.0 |

=== District 99 ===
First-term incumbent Democrat Daryl Campbell had represented the district since winning a special election in 2022.

District 99 Democratic primary details

Democratic primary
| Party | Candidate | Votes | % |
|---|---|---|---|
| Democratic | Daryl Campbell (incumbent) | 13,202 | 74.3 |
| Democratic | Joshauwa Brown | 4,560 | 25.7 |
| Total votes | | 17,762 | 100.0 |

2024 Florida House of Representatives election, 99th District
| Party | Candidate | Votes | % |
|---|---|---|---|
| Democratic | Daryl Campbell (incumbent) | Unopposed | |
| Total votes | | N/A | 100.0 |

=== District 100 ===
Third-term incumbent Republican Chip LaMarca had represented the district since 2018.

2024 Florida House of Representatives election, 100th District
| Party | Candidate | Votes | % |
|---|---|---|---|
| Republican | Chip LaMarca (incumbent) | 54,597 | 57.4 |
| Democratic | James “Jim” Brenner | 40,502 | 42.6 |
| Total votes | | 95,099 | 100.0 |
| Republican hold | | | |

=== District 101 ===
First-term incumbent Democrat Hillary Cassel had represented the district since 2022. She was re-elected unopposed after no other candidate filed before the primary election.

On December 27, 2024, Cassel announced that she was leaving the Democratic Party in favor of the Republican Party, citing the former's "failure to unequivocally support Israel" in the Israel-Hamas war.

2024 Florida House of Representatives election, 101st District
| Party | Candidate | Votes | % |
|---|---|---|---|
| Democratic | Hillary Cassel (incumbent) | Unopposed | |
| Total votes | | N/A | 100.0 |

=== District 102 ===
Third-term incumbent Democrat Michael Gottlieb had represented the district since 2022, after being redistricted from the 98th district, which he had represented since 2018.

2024 Florida House of Representatives election, 102nd District
| Party | Candidate | Votes | % |
|---|---|---|---|
| Democratic | Michael Gottlieb (incumbent) | 49,820 | 53.6 |
| Republican | Mery Lopez-Palma | 43,197 | 46.4 |
| Total votes | | 93,017 | 100.0 |
| Democratic hold | | | |

=== District 103 ===
Second-term incumbent Democrat Robin Bartleman had represented the district since 2020.

2024 Florida House of Representatives election, 103rd District
| Party | Candidate | Votes | % |
|---|---|---|---|
| Democratic | Robin Bartleman (incumbent) | 49,429 | 54.2 |
| Republican | George Navarini | 41,837 | 45.8 |
| Total votes | | 91,266 | 100.0 |
| Democratic hold | | | |

=== District 104 ===
Second-term incumbent Democrat Felicia Robinson had represented the district since 2022, after being redistricted from the 102nd district, which she had represented since 2020.

2024 Florida House of Representatives election, 104th District
| Party | Candidate | Votes | % |
|---|---|---|---|
| Democratic | Felicia Robinson (incumbent) | Unopposed | |
| Total votes | | N/A | 100.0 |

=== District 105 ===
Second-term incumbent Democrat Marie Woodson had represented the district since 2022, after being redistricted from the 101st district, which she had represented since 2020.

2024 Florida House of Representatives election, 105th District
| Party | Candidate | Votes | % |
|---|---|---|---|
| Democratic | Marie Woodson (incumbent) | 50,016 | 79.7 |
| Libertarian | Robin Bartleman | 12,749 | 20.3 |
| Total votes | | 62,765 | 100.0 |
| Democratic hold | | | |

=== District 106 ===
First-term incumbent Republican Fabián Basabe had represented the district since 2022.

District 106 Republican primary details

Republican primary
| Party | Candidate | Votes | % |
|---|---|---|---|
| Republican | Fabian Basabe (incumbent) | 3,077 | 61.9 |
| Republican | Melinda Almonte | 1,891 | 38.1 |
| Total votes | | 4,968 | 100.0 |

District 106 Democratic primary details
- Joe Saunders, former state representative

==== Endorsements ====
Joe Saunders

State legislators

- Fentrice Driskell, House minority leader
- Jason Pizzo, state senator

Organizations

- LGBTQ Victory Fund

2024 Florida House of Representatives election, 106th District
| Party | Candidate | Votes | % |
|---|---|---|---|
| Republican | Fabián Basabe (incumbent) | 38,286 | 51.3 |
| Democratic | Joe Saunders | 35,229 | 47.0 |
| Independent | Mo Saunders Scott | 1,271 | 1.7 |
| Total votes | | 74,786 | 100.0 |
| Republican hold | | | |

=== District 107 ===
Second-term incumbent Democratic Christopher Benjamin had represented the district since 2020. He was retiring to run for Miami-Dade court judgeship.

District 107 Democratic primary details

==== Candidates ====
- Wallace Aristide, high school principal
- Loreal Arscott, lawyer
- Monique Barley-Mayo, business consultant and candidate for mayor of Miami-Dade County in 2020
- Wancito Francius, candidate for this district in 2022
- Christine Olivo, 2022 Democratic nominee for Florida's 26th congressional district
- Faudlin Pierre, lawyer

==== Endorsements ====
Loreal Arscott

State legislators

- Ashley Gantt, state representative from the 109th district

Labor unions

- AFSCME
- South Florida AFL–CIO

Democratic primary
| Party | Candidate | Votes | % |
|---|---|---|---|
| Democratic | Wallace Aristide | 8,000 | 44.8 |
| Democratic | Loreal Arscott | 3,152 | 17.6 |
| Democratic | Monique Barley-Mayo | 2,012 | 11.3 |
| Democratic | Christine Sanon-Jules Olivo | 1,963 | 11.0 |
| Democratic | Faudlin Pierre | 1,555 | 8.7 |
| Democratic | Wancito Francius | 1,182 | 6.6 |
| Total votes | | 17,864 | 100.0 |

2024 Florida House of Representatives election, 107th District
| Party | Candidate | Votes | % |
|---|---|---|---|
| Democratic | Wallace Aristide | Unopposed | |
| Total votes | | N/A | 100.0 |

=== District 108 ===
Third-term incumbent Democratic Dotie Joseph had represented the district since 2018. She was re-elected unopposed after no other candidate filed before the primary election.

2024 Florida House of Representatives election, 108th District
| Party | Candidate | Votes | % |
|---|---|---|---|
| Democratic | Dotie Joseph (incumbent) | Unopposed | |
| Total votes | | N/A | 100.0 |

=== District 109 ===
First-term incumbent Democratic Ashley Gantt had represented the district since 2022.

District 109 Democratic primary details

Democratic primary
| Party | Candidate | Votes | % |
|---|---|---|---|
| Democratic | Ashley Gantt (incumbent) | 7,223 | 53.3 |
| Democratic | James Bush | 3,896 | 28.8 |
| Democratic | Roy Hardemon | 2,420 | 17.9 |
| Total votes | | 13,539 | 100.0 |

2024 Florida House of Representatives election, 109th District
| Party | Candidate | Votes | % |
|---|---|---|---|
| Democratic | Ashley Gantt (incumbent) | Unopposed | |
| Total votes | | N/A | 100.0 |

=== District 110 ===
Second-term incumbent Republican Tom Fabricio had represented the district since 2022, after being redistricted from the 103rd district, which he had represented since 2020.

2024 Florida House of Representatives election, 110th District
| Party | Candidate | Votes | % |
|---|---|---|---|
| Republican | Tom Fabricio (incumbent) | 49,881 | 71.2 |
| Democratic | Stanley “J.P.” Jean-Poix | 20,207 | 28.8 |
| Total votes | | 70,088 | 100.0 |
| Republican hold | | | |

=== District 111 ===
Second-term incumbent Republican David Borrero had represented the district since 2022, after being redistricted from the 105th district, which he had represented since 2020.

2024 Florida House of Representatives election, 111th District
| Party | Candidate | Votes | % |
|---|---|---|---|
| Republican | David Borrero (incumbent) | 45,942 | 67.4 |
| Democratic | Laura F. Kelley | 22,238 | 32.6 |
| Total votes | | 68,180 | 100.0 |
| Republican hold | | | |

=== District 112 ===
Second-term incumbent Republican Alex Rizo had represented the district since 2022, after being redistricted from the 110th district, which he had represented since 2020.

2024 Florida House of Representatives election, 112th District
| Party | Candidate | Votes | % |
|---|---|---|---|
| Republican | Alex Rizo (incumbent) | 40,199 | 72.9 |
| Democratic | Jacqueline “Jackie” Gil-Abarzua | 14,908 | 27.1 |
| Total votes | | 55,107 | 100.0 |
| Republican hold | | | |

=== District 113 ===
First-term incumbent Republican Vicki Lopez had represented the district since 2022.

2024 Florida House of Representatives election, 113th District
| Party | Candidate | Votes | % |
|---|---|---|---|
| Republican | Vicki Lopez (incumbent) | 33,461 | 54.7 |
| Democratic | Jacqueline "Jackie" Gross-Kellogg | 27,754 | 45.3 |
| Total votes | | 61,215 | 100.0 |
| Republican hold | | | |

=== District 114 ===
Second-term incumbent Republican Demi Busatta Cabrera had represented the district since 2020.

2024 Florida House of Representatives election, 114th District
| Party | Candidate | Votes | % |
|---|---|---|---|
| Republican | Demi Busatta Cabrera (incumbent) | 46,249 | 58.4 |
| Democratic | Matthew John Bornstein | 32,994 | 41.6 |
| Total votes | | 79,243 | 100.0 |
| Republican hold | | | |

=== District 115 ===
First-term incumbent Republican Alina Garcia had represented the district since 2022. She retired to successfully run for Miami-Dade County supervisor of elections.

District 115 Republican primary details

Republican primary
| Party | Candidate | Votes | % |
|---|---|---|---|
| Republican | Omar Blanco | 7,090 | 58.7 |
| Republican | Alian Alejandro Collazo | 3,512 | 29.1 |
| Republican | Moises I. Benhabib | 1,482 | 12.3 |
| Total votes | | 12,084 | 100.0 |

2024 Florida House of Representatives election, 115th District
| Party | Candidate | Votes | % |
|---|---|---|---|
| Republican | Omar Blanco | 54,952 | 59.3 |
| Democratic | Norma Perez Schwartz | 37,639 | 40.7 |
| Total votes | | 92,591 | 100.0 |
| Republican hold | | | |

=== District 116 ===
Third-term incumbent Republican Daniel Perez had represented the district since winning a special election in 2017.

2024 Florida House of Representatives election, 116th District
| Party | Candidate | Votes | % |
|---|---|---|---|
| Republican | Daniel Perez (incumbent) | 52,964 | 68.7 |
| Democratic | Nicolas Ramos | 24,110 | 31.3 |
| Total votes | | 77,074 | 100.0 |
| Republican hold | | | |

=== District 117 ===
Second-term incumbent Democratic Kevin Chambliss had represented the district since 2020.

2024 Florida House of Representatives election, 117th District
| Party | Candidate | Votes | % |
|---|---|---|---|
| Democratic | Kevin Chambliss (incumbent) | 32,347 | 52.9 |
| Republican | Beatrice Slawson | 28,823 | 47.1 |
| Total votes | | 61,170 | 100.0 |
| Democratic hold | | | |

=== District 118 ===
First-term incumbent Republican Mike Redondo had represented the district since winning a special election in 2023.

2024 Florida House of Representatives election, 118th District
| Party | Candidate | Votes | % |
|---|---|---|---|
| Republican | Mike Redondo (incumbent) | 58,355 | 68.3 |
| Democratic | Joel Vodola | 27,046 | 31.7 |
| Total votes | | 85,401 | 100.0 |
| Republican hold | | | |

=== District 119 ===
First-term incumbent Republican Juan Carlos Porras had represented the district since 2022.

2024 Florida House of Representatives election, 119th District
| Party | Candidate | Votes | % |
|---|---|---|---|
| Republican | Juan Carlos Porras (incumbent) | 54,735 | 64.6 |
| Democratic | Marcos Reyes | 29,967 | 35.4 |
| Total votes | | 84,702 | 100.0 |
| Republican hold | | | |

=== District 120 ===
Second-term incumbent Republican Jim Mooney had represented the district since 2020.

2024 Florida House of Representatives election, 120th District
| Party | Candidate | Votes | % |
|---|---|---|---|
| Republican | Jim Mooney (incumbent) | 47,562 | 63.1 |
| Democratic | Michael Travis | 27,859 | 36.9 |
| Total votes | | 75,421 | 100.0 |
| Republican hold | | | |

== See also ==
- 2024 Florida elections
  - 2024 Florida Senate election
  - 2024 United States House of Representatives elections in Florida
- List of Florida state legislatures

== Notes ==
Partisan clients
