= Samuel Vilchez Santiago =

American politician

Samuel Vichez Santiago
- Official portrait, 2026

Member of the Florida House of Representatives from the 43rd district
- Incumbent
- Assumed office November 3, 2026
- Preceded by: Johanna López

Personal details
- Party: Democratic

Samuel Vilchez Santiago is an American politician. A member of the Democratic Party, he has served in the Florida House of Representatives since 2026, representing the 43rd district.
