= South Florida (disambiguation) =

South Florida is a region of the U.S. state of Florida.

South Florida can also refer to:

- University of South Florida in Tampa, Florida
- South Florida Bulls, that university's athletics program
- South Florida Community College in Highlands, DeSoto and Hardee Counties, Florida
- Miami metropolitan area
