= Eric Gray (politician) =

American politician (born 1975)

Member of the Florida House of Representatives from the 35th district
- Incumbent
- Assumed office November 3, 2026
- Preceded by: Erika Booth

Personal details
- Born: November 22, 1975 (age 50)
- Party: Democratic
- Education: University of Florida (BS); University of Kentucky (MPA)
- Website: House website Campaign website

Eric Gray is an American politician. A member of the Democratic Party, he has served in the Florida House of Representatives since 2026, representing the 35th district.
