= Erika Booth =

American politician from Florida

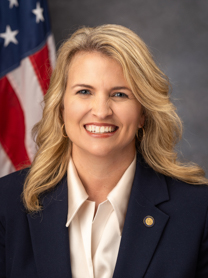
- Official portrait, c. 2024

Member of the Florida House of Representatives from the 35th district
- In office November 5, 2024 – November 3, 2026
- Preceded by: Tom Keen
- Succeeded by: Eric Gray

Member of the Osceola County School Board from the 5th district
- In office November 8, 2022 – December 12, 2023
- Preceded by: Robert Bass
- Succeeded by: Scott Ramsey

Personal details
- Born: September 27, 1977 (age 49) Kissimmee, Florida, U.S.
- Party: Republican
- Spouse: Ricky Booth (m. 2005)
- Children: 3
- Education: University of Florida (BS); University of Central Florida (MEd)
- Occupation: Politician; educator
- Website: erikaboothfl.com

Erika Booth (born September 27, 1977) is an American educator and politician who currently serves as a Republican member of the Florida House of Representatives from the 35th district, which includes most of Osceola County and eastern parts of Orange County. She previously served as a member of the Osceola County School Board from 2022 to 2023.

== Early life and education ==
Erika was born on September 27, 1977 in Kissimmee, Florida. She graduated from Saint Cloud High School in 1995 and earned her bachelor's degree in health science from the University of Florida in 2000. She later earned a master's degree in education from the University of Central Florida.

== Professional career ==
Booth has been a public elementary school teacher for 20 years and was honored for her teaching techniques in 2020.

== Political career ==
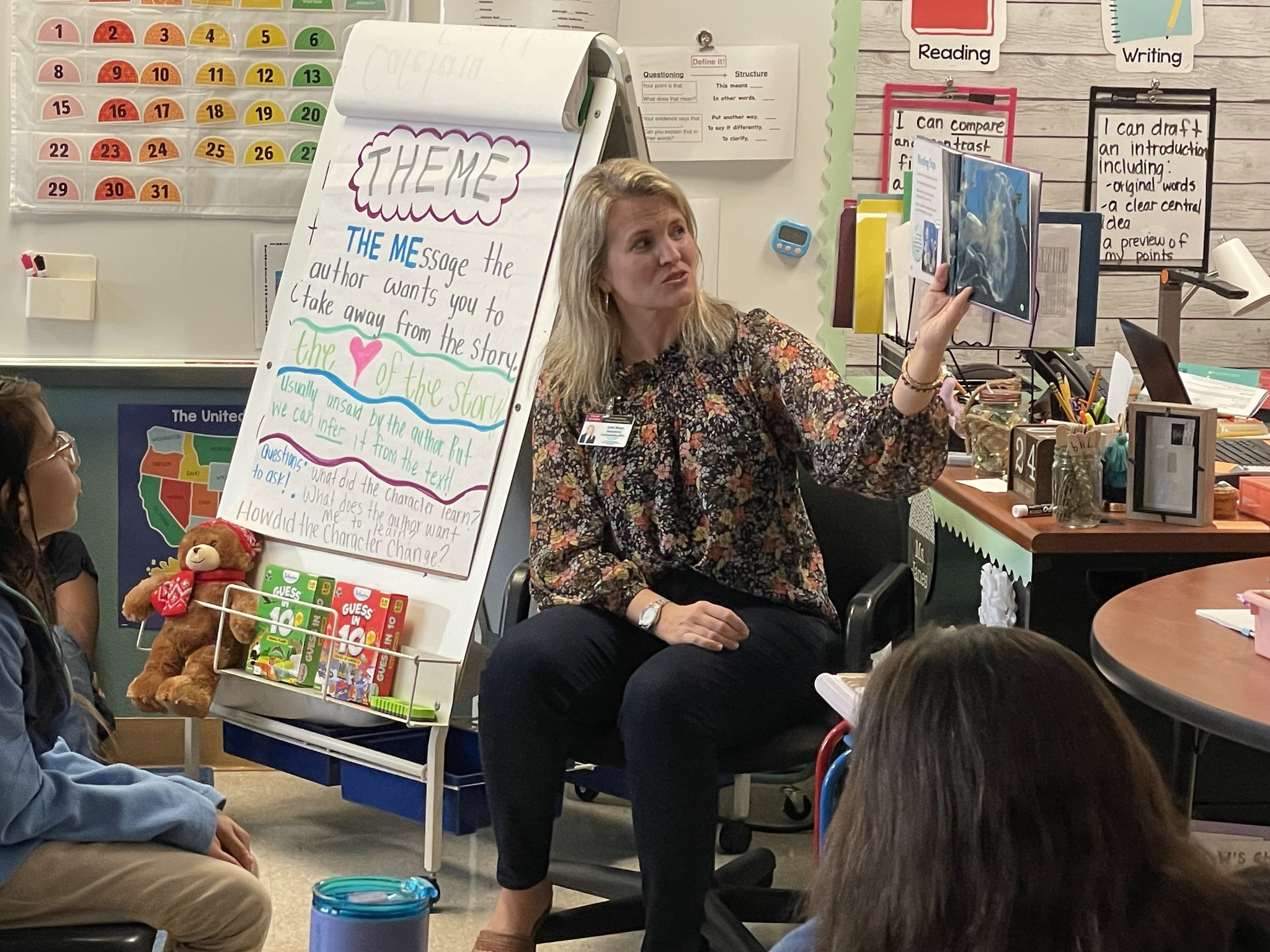
Booth reading to students

=== Osceola County School Board ===
Booth was elected to the Osceola County School Board for District 5 in 2022. She resigned from her office after her final board meeting on December 12, 2023. Booth was succeeded by fellow Republican Scott Ramsey, who was appointed to the seat by Governor Ron DeSantis on July 20, 2024.

=== Florida House of Representatives ===
After an unsuccessful campaign for the 35th district of the Florida House of Representatives in the 2024 special election, which she lost to Tom Keen, Booth announced her candidacy for a rematch in the 2024 Florida House of Representatives election. Her campaign was endorsed by DeSantis and she won the August primary with 63% of the vote. Booth went on to defeat Keen in the general election; a gain for Republicans. She was sworn into office on November 19, 2024.

== Personal life ==
Booth married her husband Ricky, a current Osceola County commissioner, in 2002. They have three children and live in St. Cloud, Florida.

Florida House of Representatives
Preceded by Tom Keen	Member of the Florida House of Representatives from the 35th district 2024–present	Incumbent
