= Norman L. Stephens Jr. =

- Stephens in 2005

President of South Florida Community College
- In office 2002–2013
- Preceded by: Catherine Cornelius
- Succeeded by: Thomas Leitzel

Personal details
- Born: Hinsdale, Illinois
- Education: University of Florida
- Website: docstephens.org

Norman L. Stephens Jr. (Norm Stephens) is an American academic and President Emeritus of South Florida State College.

== Early life and education ==
Stephens was born in the Chicago area where the family lived until they moved to Fort Lauderdale, Florida when he was in high school. He attended the University of Florida where he graduated with his Bachelor of Science degree then went on to receive his master's degree. From there, he received a doctoral fellowship in interdisciplinary science education and earned his doctorate 1971.

== Career ==
Stephens began his career in 1968 at St. Petersburg College teaching science later becoming acting vice president of educational and student services. By 1987, he was provost at Hillsborough Community College's Brandon Learning Center in Hillsborough County, Florida.

In 1990, Stephens joined Lincoln Land Community College in Springfield, Illinois as vice president of academic services, then in 1993 became president. During his presidency he served on the Capital Task Force for the Illinois Community College Board and the Vision 2000 Strategic Plan for the Illinois Community College System. He resigned from that post in September 1999 over various disagreements with the board of trustees.

Following his tenure in Illinois, Stephens served as President of the Auburn Hills Campus of Oakland Community College in Michigan from 1999 to 2002. In 2002, he became the president of South Florida Community College, a position he held until he retired in 2013.
