= Tom Keen (politician) =

American politician and activist

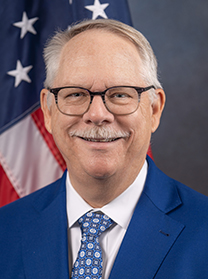

Member of the Orlando City Commission from the 1st district
- Incumbent
- Assumed office January 12, 2026
- Preceded by: Jim Gray

Member of the Florida House of Representatives from the 35th district district
- In office January 27, 2024 – November 5, 2024
- Preceded by: Fred Hawkins
- Succeeded by: Erika Booth

Personal details
- Born: Charles Thomas Keen III; April 9, 1956 (age 70) Denver, Colorado, U.S.
- Party: Democratic
- Spouse: Laura Keen
- Children: 3
- Education: University of Cincinnati (BA)

Charles Thomas Keen III (born April 9, 1956) is an American politician, businessman, and former military officer who serves as a City Commissioner on Orlando City Council, representing District 1. He previously served as a member of the Florida House of Representatives from January to November 2024, where he represented the 35th district, located in central Florida, southeast of Orlando, and also parts of Orange and Osceola counties.

== Early life and education ==
Keen has a bachelor's degree from the University of Cincinnati.

== Military Service ==
Keen joined the United States Navy and was designated a Naval Flight Officer after completing flight school in 1983. He specialized in airborne reconnaissance missions. Shore assignments included duty at the US Embassy in London.

== Career ==
He retired from active duty as a Commander (O-5) and worked as a manager at Collins Aerospace at the time of his election to the state legislature.

Early Political Career

Keen unsuccessfully ran for State Senate in Indiana in 2012 losing to Republican Incumbent David Long by a margin of over 30 points.

Move to Florida and Campaigns for City Commission and Florida Legislature

Keen ran unsuccessfully for Orlando City Commission, District 1 in 2017 and lost to Incumbent Jim Gray by over 10 points. Keen would later go on to beat Gray in a rematch in 2025.

After an unsuccessful campaign for the 35th district of the Florida House of Representatives in 2022, in which he lost the primary by a mere 57 votes, in May 2023, Keen announced his candidacy for a special election to succeed State Representative Fred Hawkins, who resigned to become president of South Florida State College. On November 7, 2023, he won the Democratic primary in what was considered an upset, as he had been outraised by his two opponents. Both parties heavily invested into winning the special election, due to Hawkins's 11-point re-election win in 2022, while President Joe Biden had won the district by five points in 2020. Keen received the endorsement of the Orlando Sentinel during the campaign. In the special election on January 16, 2024, Keen defeated Republican nominee Erika Booth by roughly 2.6 percentage points, in a flip for his party. In a rematch in the November 2024 general election, Republican nominee Erika Booth defeated Keen flipping the seat back to Republicans.

In the 2025 City of Orlando municipal election, Keen ran for City Commissioner to represent District 1 on City Council. He won the general election on November 4, 2025, defeating incumbent Jim Gray and other candidates with approximately 54% of the vote. Keen assumed office as District 1 Commissioner on January 12, 2026.

== Personal life ==
Keen and his wife, Laura, have three special needs adult children, and reside in Lake Nona, Orlando, Florida.

== Electoral history ==
2012 Indiana's 16th Senate district election
| Party | Candidate | Votes | % |
|---|---|---|---|
| Republican | David Long (incumbent) | 33,290 | 65.15% |
| Democratic | Tom Keen | 17,809 | 34.85% |
| Total votes | | 51,099 | 100.00 |

2017 Orlando general election, City Commissioner District 1
| Party | Candidate | Votes | % |
|---|---|---|---|
| Nonpartisan | Jim Gray (incumbent) | 1,621 | 53.18% |
| Nonpartisan | Tom Keen | 1,208 | 38.63% |
| Nonpartisan | Sunshine L. Grund | 219 | 7.19% |
| Total votes | | 3,048 | 100.00 |

2022 Florida House of Representatives election, District 35 Democratic primary
| Party | Candidate | Votes | % |
|---|---|---|---|
| Democratic | Rishi Bagga | 4,060 | 38.69% |
| Democratic | Tom Keen | 4,003 | 38.14% |
| Democratic | Tahitiana Munoz-Chaffin | 2,432 | 23.17% |
| Total votes | | 10,495 | 100.00 |

2024 Florida's 35th House of Representatives district special Democratic primary
| Party | Candidate | Votes | % |
|---|---|---|---|
| Democratic | Tom Keen | 2,419 | 35.84% |
| Democratic | Rishi Bagga | 2,278 | 33.75% |
| Democratic | Marucci Guzman | 2,053 | 30.41% |
| Total votes | | 6,750 | 100.00 |

2024 Florida's 35th House of Representatives district special election
| Party | Candidate | Votes | % | ±% |
|---|---|---|---|---|
| Democratic | Tom Keen | 11,390 | 51.33% | +6.74% |
| Republican | Erika Booth | 10,800 | 48.67% | −6.74% |
| Total votes | | 22,190 | 100.00 | |
| Democratic gain from Republican | | | | |

2024 Florida's 35th House of Representatives district election
| Party | Candidate | Votes | % | ±% |
|---|---|---|---|---|
| Republican | Erika Booth | 47,863 | 51.98% | +3.31% |
| Democratic | Tom Keen (incumbent) | 44,209 | 48.02% | −3.31% |
| Total votes | | 92,072 | 100.00 | |
| Republican gain from Democratic | | | | |

2025 Orlando general election, City Commissioner District 1
| Party | Candidate | Votes | % |
|---|---|---|---|
| Nonpartisan | Tom Keen | 2,962 | 53.97% |
| Nonpartisan | Jim Gray (incumbent) | 1,715 | 31.25% |
| Nonpartisan | Sunshine L. Grund | 528 | 9.62% |
| Nonpartisan | Manny Acosta | 283 | 5.16% |
| Total votes | | 5,488 | 100.00 |
