= Lindsay Cross =

American politician and environmental scientist

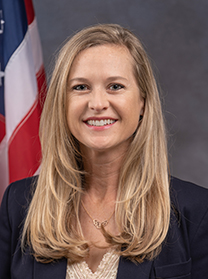

Member of the Florida House of Representatives from the 60th district
- Incumbent
- Assumed office November 8, 2022
- Preceded by: Ben Diamond (redistricting)

Personal details
- Born: November 21, 1977 (age 48)
- Party: Democratic
- Education: Colorado State University (BS); University of South Florida (MS)

Lindsay Cross is an American politician and environmental scientist serving as a member of the Florida House of Representatives for the 60th district in parts of Pinellas County, Florida. She assumed office on November 8, 2022. Her district is in St. Petersburg, Florida.

== Education ==
Cross earned a Bachelor of Science degree in environmental health from Colorado State University in 2000 and a Master of Science in environmental science and policy from the University of South Florida in 2005.

== Career ==
From 2002 to 2016, Cross worked for the Tampa Bay Estuary Program as a technical assistant, environmental scientist, and environmental science and policy manager. From 2016 to 2018, she was the executive director of the Florida Wildlife Corridor. She joined Florida Conservation Voters in 2019, working as a public lands advocate and government relations director. Cross was elected to the Florida House of Representatives in District 60 in November 2022.
