= Ryan Chamberlin =

American politician

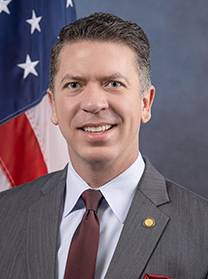

Member of the Florida House of Representatives from the 24th district
- Incumbent
- Assumed office May 16, 2023
- Preceded by: Joe Harding

Personal details
- Born: May 17, 1974 (age 52) Atlanta, Georgia, U.S.
- Party: Republican
- Education: College of Central Florida

Ryan Chamberlin (born May 17, 1974) is an American politician, author, and consultant. He serves as a Republican member for the 24th district of the Florida House of Representatives.

== Life and career ==
Chamberlin was born in Atlanta, Georgia. He attended Souls Harbor Christian Academy and the College of Central Florida.

In March 2023, Chamberlin defeated Justin Albright, Stephen Pyles, Charlie Stone and Jose Juarez in the special Republican primary election for the 24th district of the Florida House of Representatives. Following Chamberlin’s win, local businessman Jose Juarez, who came in second in the primary, filed a defamation lawsuit against Front Line Agency and a Chamberlin-supporting PAC called Floridians for Ethics and Truth in Politics. The suit was settled out of court. Part of the settlement was a public apology from the defendants for claims against Juarez during the campaign. In May 2023, he defeated write-in candidate Robert Fox in the special general election, winning 78 percent of the vote.
