= Jessica Baker =

American politician

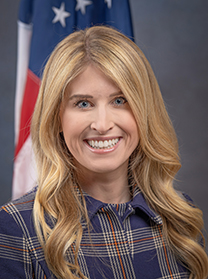

Member of the Florida House of Representatives from the 17th district
- Incumbent
- Assumed office November 8, 2022
- Preceded by: Cyndi Stevenson

Personal details
- Party: Republican
- Education: Florida State University (BA, JD)

Jessica Baker is an American attorney and politician serving as a member of the Florida House of Representatives for the 17th district. She assumed office on November 8, 2022.

== Education ==
Baker earned a Bachelor of Arts degree from Florida State University and a Juris Doctor from the Florida State University College of Law.

== Career ==
Baker worked as a lobbyist for Sachs Sax Caplan. She also served on the staff of Jacksonville Mayor Lenny Curry and works as a prosecutor in the Seventh Judicial Circuit Court of Florida. She was elected to the Florida House of Representatives in November 2022.
