= Florida's 57th House of Representatives district =

Florida district

Florida's 57th State House of Representatives district
Representative
Adam Anderson; R–Palm Harbor

Florida's 57th House of Representatives district elects one member of the Florida House of Representatives. It covers parts of Pinellas County.

== Members ==
- Adam Anderson (since 2022)
