= Johanna López =

American politician (born 1972)

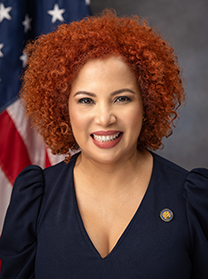

Member of the Florida House of Representatives from the 43rd district
- Incumbent
- Assumed office November 8, 2022
- Preceded by: Kristen Arrington
- Succeeded by: Samuel Vilchez Santiago

Member of the Orange County School Board from the 2nd district
- In office November 27, 2018 – November 8, 2022
- Preceded by: Daryl Flynn
- Succeeded by: Maria Salamanca

Personal details
- Born: February 18, 1972 (age 54) Aguadilla, Puerto Rico
- Party: Democratic
- Children: 4
- Education: University of Puerto Rico (BA); Interamerican University of Puerto Rico (M.Ed.)

Johanna López (born February 18, 1972, in Aguadilla, Puerto Rico) is an American politician. She is the representative for District 43 in the Florida House of Representatives.

Lopez has a Bachelor of Arts in Hispanic Studies from the University of Puerto Rico and a Master of Education in Hispanic Studies; Higher Education, from the Interamerican University of Puerto Rico. She was the first Latina to serve on Orange County's school board.
