= Adam Anderson (politician) =

American politician

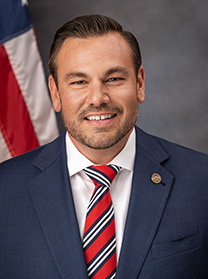

Member of the Florida House of Representatives from the 57th district
- Incumbent
- Assumed office November 8, 2022
- Preceded by: Mike Beltran (redistricting)

Personal details
- Party: Republican
- Education: Florida State University (BS)

Adam Charles Anderson is an American politician and businessman. A Republican member for District 57 in the Florida House of Representatives, he represents northern Pinellas County, Florida. He was re-elected in 2026.

Anderson graduated with Bachelors of Science in Real Estate and Finance from Florida State University in 2005. He was first elected in 2022. He is the Managing Partner and CEO of MRA Capital Partners, LP and Cofounder of MRA Advisory Group with offices in Tampa, Florida and Parsippany, New Jersey.

== Florida House of Representatives ==
=== Elections ===
==== 2022 ====
In 2022, Anderson won his first election.

==== 2024 ====
Subsequently, Representative Anderson was reelected against challenger Kelly Johnson 58.8% to 36.8%.

=== Committee Assignments ===
==== 2022–2023 ====
- Health & Human Services Committee (Republican Committee Whip)
- Healthcare Regulation Subcomittee
- Health & Human Services Committee
- Healthcare Regulation Subcommittee
- Joint Committee on Public Counsel Oversight
- Higher Education Appropriations Subcommittee
- Insurance and Banking Subcommittee
- Local Administration, Federal Affairs & Special Districts Subcommittee

==== 2024–2025 ====
- Health Care Facilities & Systems Subcommittee (Chairman)
- Health & Human Services Committee
- Judiciary Committee
- Health Care Budget Subcommittee
- Insurance & Banking Subcommittee
- Natural Resources & Disasters Subcommittee

=== Notable legislation ===
==== Genomic and rare disease initiatives ====
Anderson pioneered the establishment of the Florida Institute for Pediatric Rare Diseases within the Florida State University College of Medicine to advance research, diagnosis, and treatment of rare diseases in children.

Introduced the Sunshine Genetics Pilot Program, an initiative offering genetic testing for newborns to identify rare diseases early, in addition to the state's existing screening program.

HB 907 created the Sunshine Genetics Consortium to foster collaboration across the nation among professionals from universities and children's hospitals to advance genetic research and medicine, integrating advanced technologies and education.

Championed legislation to add Duchenne Muscular Dystrophy to the state newborn screening.
