= Florida's 24th House of Representatives district =

American legislative district

Florida's 24th State House of Representatives district
Representative
Ryan Chamberlin; R–Belleview

Florida's 24th House of Representatives district elects one member of the Florida House of Representatives. It covers parts of Marion County.

== Members ==
- Travis Hutson (2012–2015)
- Paul Renner (2015–2022)
- Ryan Chamberlin (since 2023)
