= Florida's 35th House of Representatives district =

Florida district

Florida's 35th State House of Representatives district
Representative
Eric Gray; D–Orlando
- Demographics: 79.5% White; 5.6% Black; 11.3% Hispanic; 1.2% Asian
- Population (2024): 159,936

Florida's 35th House of Representatives district elects one member of the Florida House of Representatives. It covers parts of Orange County and Osceola County.

== Members ==
- Fred Hawkins (R) (2022–2023)
- Tom Keen (D) (2024)
- Erika Booth (R) (2024-2026)
- Eric Gray (D) (since 2026)
