= Dean Black =

American politician from Florida

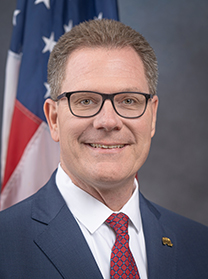

Member of the Florida House of Representatives from the 15th district
- Incumbent
- Assumed office November 8, 2022
- Preceded by: Wyman Duggan

Personal details
- Born: November 3, 1965 (age 61) Jacksonville, Florida, U.S.
- Party: Republican
- Spouse: Kimberly A. Black
- Children: 5
- Education: University of Mississippi
- Occupation: Small business owner, cattle rancher
- Website: votedeanblack.com

Dean Black is an American politician who is a Republican member of the Florida Legislature representing the state's 15th House district, which includes Nassau County and some of Duval County.

An 8th generation Northeast Florida native, Dean Black and his wife Kim have 5 children. Serving as Chairman of the Republican Party of Duval County since 2018 and re-elected subsequently, Black is a local business owner and rancher. He is also a Air Force Veteran and was a member of the 125th Fighter Wing, Florida Air National Guard on Jacksonville’s Northside. A staunch Trump supporter, Black was a campaign surrogate, official Delegate to the 2020 Republican National Convention, and had a leading presence on the campaign trail.

== Florida House of Representatives ==
=== 2023 Florida Legislative Session ===
Rep. Black sponsored a bill that stops public-sector unions from automatically deducting union dues from employee paychecks.

=== 2024 Florida Legislative Session ===
Dean filed a House bill called the "What is a Woman Act". This bill, named after conservative commentator Matt Walsh's controversial documentary, would legally define the terms "man" and woman" based on a person's "biological sex at birth." If passed, all identifying legal documents in Florida would use the term "sex" instead of "gender", making it impossible for transgender individuals to change their gender markers. Equality Florida condemned the bill, calling it an attack on transgender people.

In response to the trend of government officials taking down Confederate statues, Black filed legislation that would punish any lawmakers who vote to remove "historical monuments and memorials." Under this bill, if local lawmakers vote in favor of the removal of Confederate statues, they may be fined or removed from office by the governor. The bill died in committee in March 2024.
