= Florida's 60th House of Representatives district =

Florida district

Florida's 60th State House of Representatives district
Representative
Lindsay Cross; D–St. Petersburg

Florida's 60th House of Representatives district elects one member of the Florida House of Representatives. It covers parts of Pinellas County.

== Members ==
- Lindsay Cross (since 2022)
