= Fred Hawkins (politician) =

American politician and academic administrator

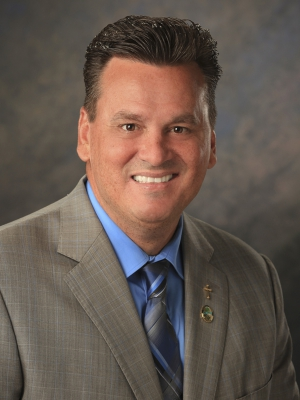
- Official portrait, c. 2020

Member of the Florida House of Representatives
- In office November 3, 2020 – June 30, 2023
- Preceded by: Mike La Rosa
- Succeeded by: Tom Keen
- Constituency: 42nd district (2020–2022); 35th district (2022–2023)

Personal details
- Born: July 11, 1967 (age 59) Ohio, U.S.
- Party: Republican
- Spouse: Tiffany
- Children: 1
- Education: University of Akron

Fred Hawkins (born July 11, 1967) is an American politician and academic administrator who is the current president of South Florida State College. Hawkins served as a member of the Florida House of Representatives from 2020 until his resignation in 2023, representing parts of Central Florida around Osceola, Orange, and Polk counties.

== Early life and education ==
Hawkins was born in Ohio. He earned a B.S. degree in political science from the University of Akron.

== Career ==
From 2008 to 2020, Hawkins served as a commissioner for Osceola County. He also served on the planning commission for Osceola County from 1998 to 2007.

On May 11, 2023, Hawkins announced via social media that he had been chosen to become the next president of South Florida State College. He resigned from the House on June 30.

In 2026, an English professor was fired from SFSC by Hawkins for assigning the short story “Bettering Myself" by Ottessa Moshfegh as part of an assignment analyzing unreliable first person narrators, a story she had been assigning for nearly a decade without incident. Hawkins told the professor the story was "political", that “he would not want his own college-aged daughter reading” it, and that he didn’t “ever want to see this story again." The instructor was fired the next day.

== Committee assignments ==
- Higher Education Appropriations Subcommittee Vice Chair
- Education & Employment Committee Republican Committee Whip
- Postsecondary Education & Workforce Subcommittee
- Appropriations Committee
- Local Administration, Federal Affairs & Special Districts Subcommittee

== Election history ==
2020 Florida House of Representatives General election District 42
Party	Candidate	Votes	%
Republican	Fred Hawkins	46,615	46.8%
Democratic	Barbara Ann Cady	45,455	45.7%
Independent	Leroy Sanchez	7,474	7.5%
Total votes		99,544	100%
Republican hold			

2022 Florida House of Representatives General election District 35
Party	Candidate	Votes	%
Republican	Fred Hawkins	32,858	55.4%
Democratic	Rishi Bagga	26,447	44.6%
Total votes		59,305	100%
Republican hold			
