= Florida's 43rd House of Representatives district =

Florida district

Florida's 43rd State House of Representatives district
Representative
Johanna López; D–Orlando

Florida's 43rd House of Representatives district elects one member of the Florida House of Representatives. It covers parts of Orange County.

== Members ==
- Johanna López (since 2022)
