= South Florida State College =

Multi-campus public college in Florida, U.S.

Coordinates: 27°34′09″N 81°30′34″W

- Type: Public college
- Established: July 7, 1965; 61 years ago
- Parent institution: Florida College System
- President: Fred Hawkins
- Location: Highlands County, DeSoto County, and Hardee County, Florida, United States
- Website: www.southflorida.edu

South Florida State College is a public college with campuses in Highlands, DeSoto and Hardee counties of Florida, United States. The college is part of the Florida College System. South Florida State College was founded in 1965 and serves around 5,000 students a year. The 228 acres (0.92 km^{2}) Highlands Campus is located two miles (3 km) south of Avon Park, Florida. The college is on an isthmus, bounded on the north by Lake Lelia, to the south by Lake Glenada, and to the west by U.S. Highway 27. It is a public college offering College Credit Certificates, Career Certificates, and associate degrees in over 60 fields of study as well as three bachelor's degrees.

Through articulation agreements, the college partners with other four-year colleges and universities to provide for a seamless transfer to pursue selected bachelor's and master's degrees. Specialized courses are geared for Adult Education needs and coursework is offered through a combination of traditional classroom and distance learning instruction. An athletic program fields teams in women's volleyball, women's softball, women's cross country, and men's baseball.

== History ==
Presidents
William A. Stallard	1965–1984
Catherine P. Cornelius	1984–2002
Norman L. Stephens Jr.	2002–2013
Thomas C. Leitzel	2013–2023
Fred Hawkins	2023–present

In 1960, efforts began to open a junior college in Avon Park. In 1965, the College was founded as South Florida Junior College. A Highlands-Hardee Junior College Advisory Committee was appointed by the Florida State Board of Education. Dr. William A. Stallard was appointed as the first president of the College. The first term of college began in temporary quarters in Avon Park on Aug. 22, 1966. The first term had a full-time faculty of 14, serving 164 full-time students and 119 part-time and evening students.

The College immediately began expansion of its programs and even had a basketball team in its first year of existence. In 1968, the College became fully accredited by the state, the first junior college to gain full accreditation in less than three years. That same year, a vocational technical program was started, and groundbreaking ceremonies were held on the Highlands Campus' current site.

In January 1970, permanent facilities for the college's staff were completed and the staff was moved there. In 1974, the vocational buildings, a bookstore, and a student center were constructed. The school's auditorium was completed in 1978, and in 1982 the gymnasium was completed.

In January 1984, Dr. Stallard retired as president, and Dr. Richard Morley was named interim president. In March 1984, the District Board of Trustees renamed the college South Florida Community College. Two months later, the South Florida Community College Foundation held its first meeting. The Foundation's goal was to offer grants and scholarships to students. In July 1984, Dr. Catherine Cornelius became the second president of South Florida Community College.

In late 1984, the DeSoto and Lake Placid centers of the college were opened. The DeSoto Center first had three classrooms and an office. Today the DeSoto Campus is housed in a large modern building. The DeSoto Center originally had three classrooms and an office in the Fountain Plaza. A new campus was built in 2003 with much more space. The Lake Placid Center was established in a former public school.

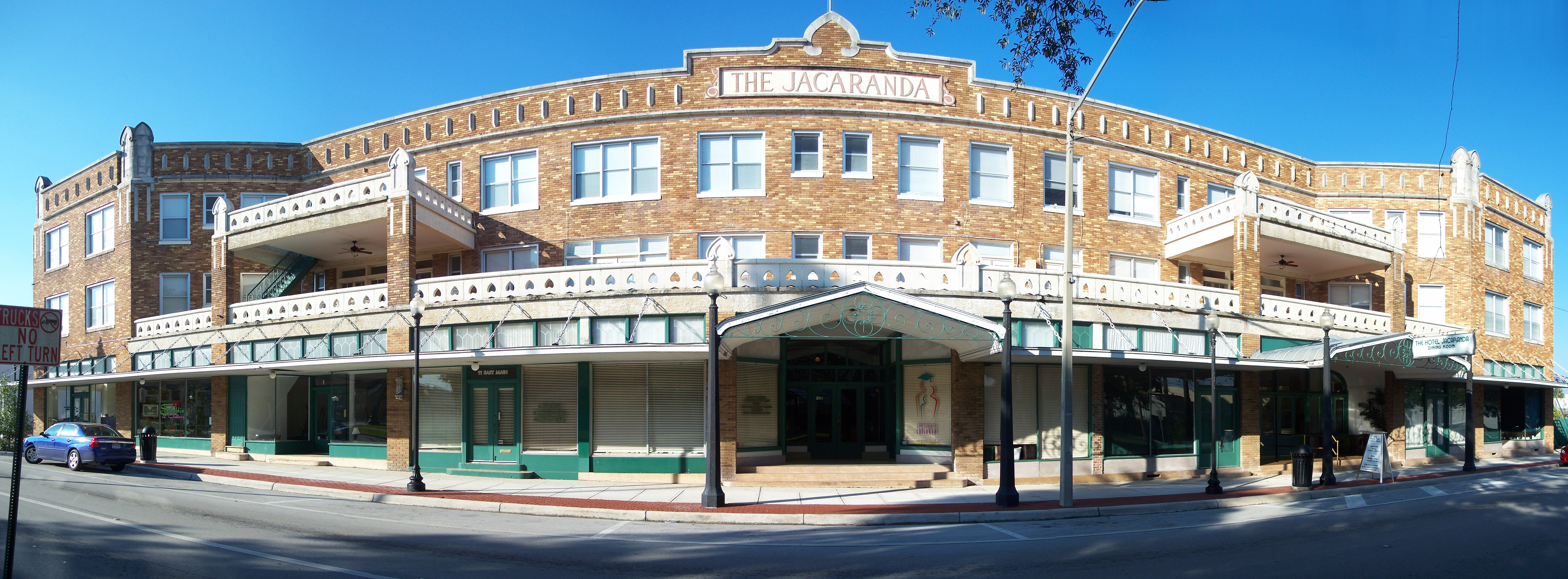
The Jacaranda

In 1988, the Hotel Jacaranda was acquired. The hotel was built in the 1920s and was a distinguished hotel for many years. Babe Ruth, George Burns, and Gracie Allen, among others, stayed there. The hotel serves as a residence facility for South Florida State College student-athletes and offers hotel accommodations and a restaurant to the public.

Telecourses were first offered in 1992. In 1993, the Public Service Academy was opened. This unit provides training and education in criminal justice, emergency medical services, and law enforcement.

In 1999, the Crews Center opened. In 2002, the Museum of Florida Art and Culture (MOFAC) and the University Center were opened.

In 2003, the Dental Education Center opened, as well as the Hardee and DeSoto campuses.

On July 1, 2012, the college officially changed its name to South Florida State College.

In February 2026, an English professor was fired from SFSC for assigning the short story “Bettering Myself" by Ottessa Moshfegh as part of an assignment analyzing unreliable first person narrators, a story she had been assigning for nearly a decade without incident. SFSC president Fred Hawkins told the professor the story was "political", that “he would not want his own college-aged daughter reading” it, and that he didn’t “ever want to see this story again." The instructor was fired the next day. The professor, represented by the Foundation for Individual Rights and Expression (FIRE), sued the college on July 29 of that year, demanding that she be restored to her position and that she should be awarded with backpay.

== Campuses and centers ==
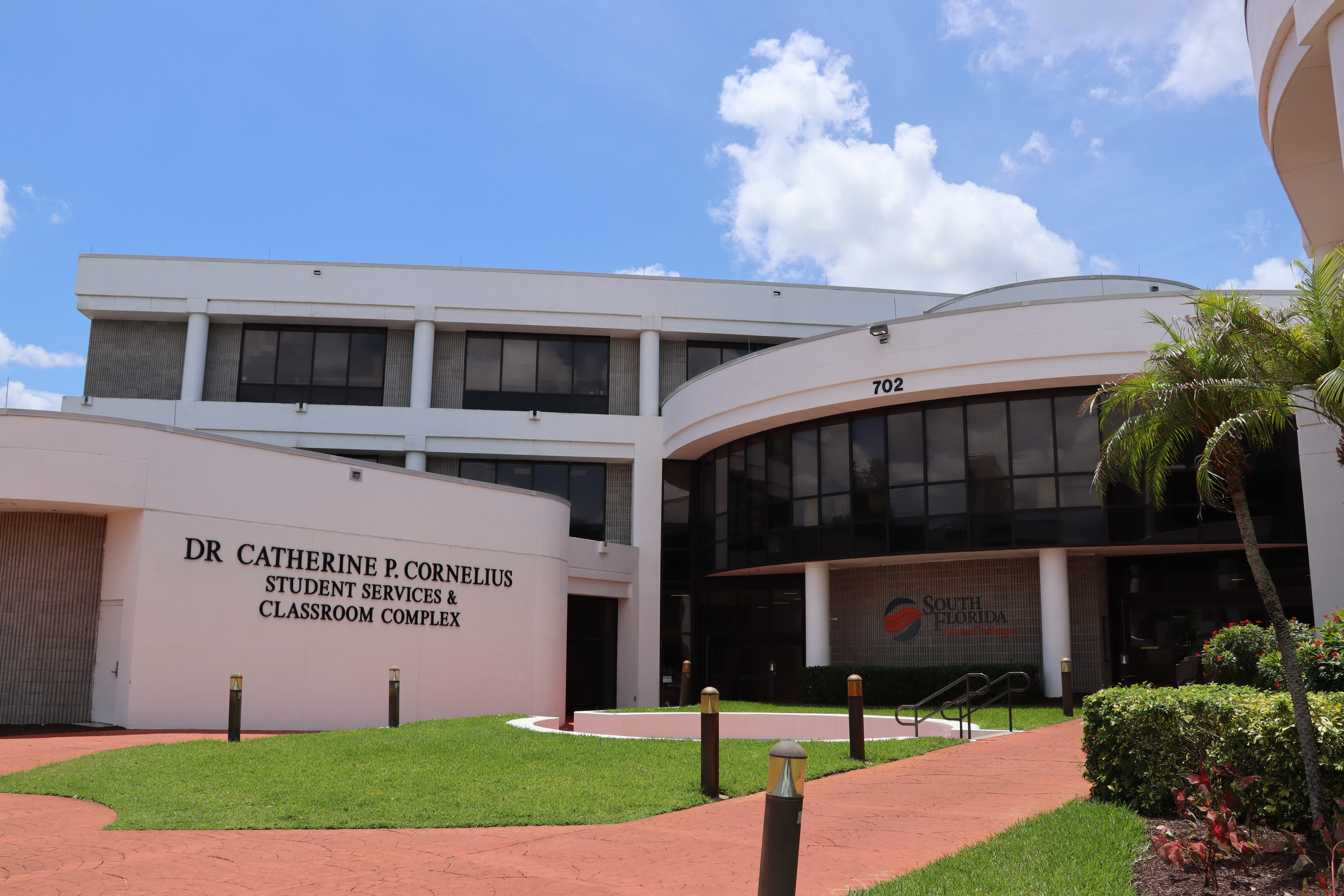
Dr. Catherine P. Cornelius Student Services & Classroom Complex

- The Highlands Campus, between Avon Park and Sebring, Florida.
- The Lake Placid Center, in Lake Placid, Florida.
- The Hardee Campus, at Bowling Green, Florida.
- The DeSoto Campus, at Arcadia, Florida.
- The Hotel Jacaranda, in downtown Avon Park.
- The Crews Center, in Avon Park.

The Highlands, Hardee, and DeSoto campuses and Lake Placid Center offer a variety of vocational and academic programs.

The Jacaranda Hotel serves a variety of purposes. It has dormitory facilities for students and commercial hotel rooms for guests. The Hotel Jacaranda Dining Room is a restaurant where food service students learn culinary and food management skills. Finally, several office spaces and storefronts are leased to business tenants.

The Crews Center has facilities for commercial driving and Construction Trades program students.

=== Cultural performances ===
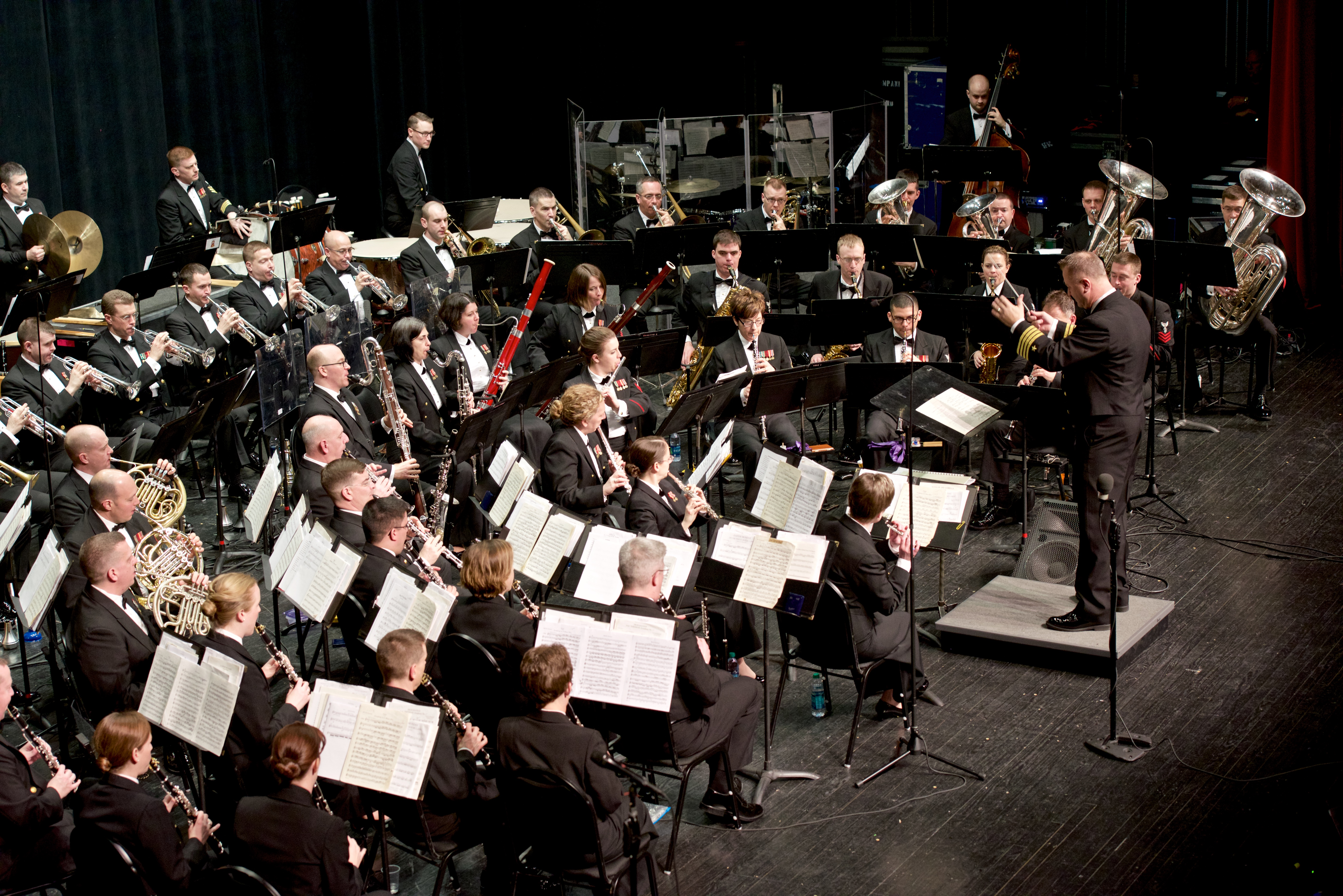
U.S. Navy Band performs a concert at South Florida State College, 2015

In addition to its role as the only post-secondary institution in the district, 'South Florida State College serves as a cultural focal point, providing quality entertainment to Florida's Heartland since 1984.

Performances are held on the Highlands Campus in the 1,460-seat Wildstein Center for the Performing Arts and the 245-seat University Center Auditorium. Past performers have included Engelbert Humperdinck, Bob Newhart, Marie Osmond, and the Smothers Brothers.

=== Museum of Florida Art and Culture ===
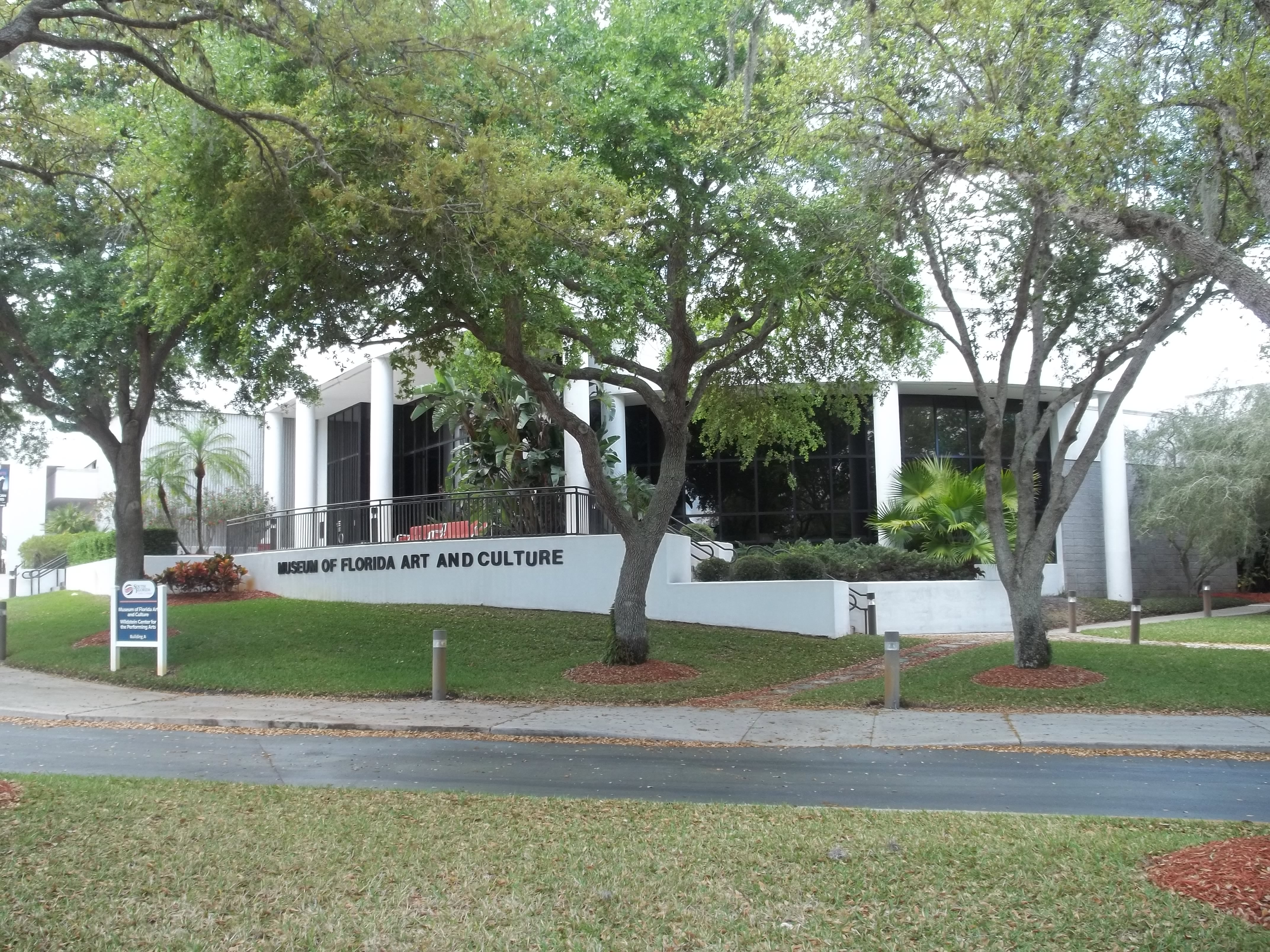
South Florida State College Museum of Florida Art and Culture

Since 2002, the Highlands Campus has been home to the SFSC Museum of Florida Art and Culture, which is open from October through May, Wednesdays, Thursdays, and Fridays, 12:30-4:30 p.m. The museum provides an exhibition venue for contemporary Florida regional artists and preserves Florida's history and heritage through its art. MOFAC also serves as a repository for the discoveries unearthed by members of the Kissimmee Valley Archaeological and Historical Conservancy.

The museum also oversees the Wildflower Wayside Shrine Trail, an ongoing exhibition in which science, art, and the natural world come together. This self-guided walking trail explores pristine scrubland on the Highlands Campus and contains six shrine boxes created by artist Mollie Doctrow to honor the endangered plant species found on the Lake Wales Ridge, the oldest ecosystem in the southeastern United States. This project was made possible by a grant from the U.S. Institute of Museum and Library Services.

== Academics ==
South Florida State College serves around 5,000 students a year. It is a public college offering College Credit Certificates, Career Certificates, and associate degrees in over 60 fields of study. The college also offers selected bachelor's degrees and has articulation agreements for students to pursue select bachelor's, master's, and doctoral degrees in partnership with four-year colleges and universities. Specialized courses are geared for Adult Education needs and coursework is offered through a mix of traditional classroom and distance learning instruction. The college is accredited by the Southern Association of Colleges and Schools Commission on Colleges.

== Student life ==
=== Athletics ===
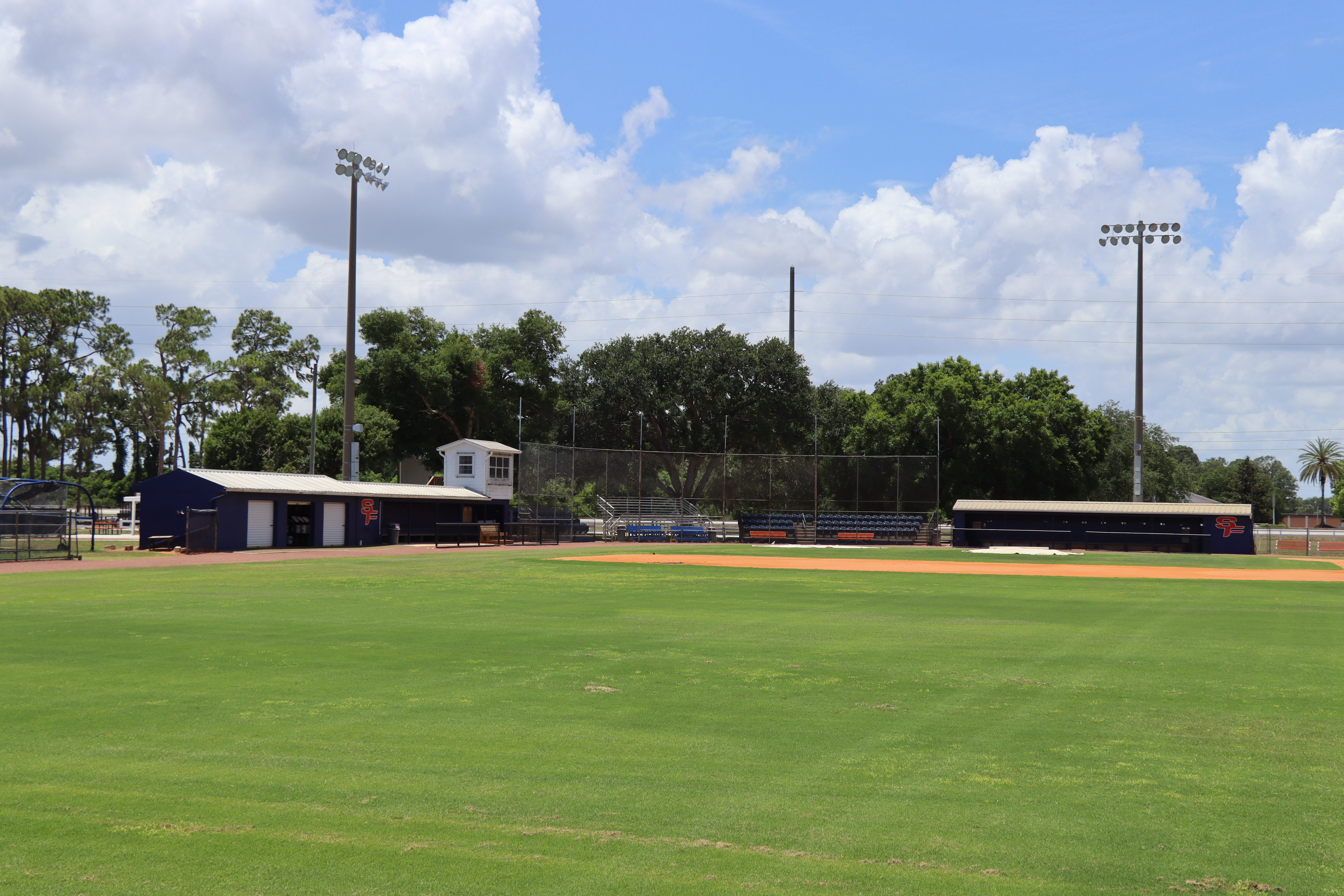
South Florida State College baseball field

The college fields women's volleyball, women's cross country, women's softball, and men's baseball. They are named the Panthers.

== Notable alumni ==
- Andrew Barbosa, baseball player
- Melony Bell, member of the Florida House of Representatives and supervisor of elections of Polk County
- Darren Clarke, baseball player
- Ronald Draper, basketball player
- Shelby Dressel, country singer-songwriter
- George Floyd, murder victim whose death sparked nationwide protests
- James Hurst, baseball player
- Jesse Litsch, baseball player
- Ryan Raburn, baseball player
- Baxter Troutman, member of the Florida House of Representatives
- Chris Waters, baseball player

== Notable faculty ==
- Fred Hawkins, former member of the Florida House of Representatives who became the president of SFSC
