= 2026 Florida redistricting =

Mid-decade change to congressional district boundaries

Map of Florida's congressional districts as passed by the Florida Legislature on April 29, 2026, which will be in use at the 2026 elections pending legal challenges Interactive map version

2024 United States presidential election in Florida under the 2022–2026 districts and the new map: Trump (R) +5–10 +10–20% +20% / Harris (D) +0–5 +5–10 +10–20% +20%

Since 2025, the U.S. state of Florida and its Republican governor, Ron DeSantis, have faced pressure from national Republicans to gerrymander the state's congressional map as part of a broader national effort between red states and blue states to gain an advantage in the 2026 U.S. House elections. In Florida, the authority to redraw congressional districts lies solely with the Florida State Legislature.

At the 2024 general election, Florida's congressional plan returned twenty Republicans and eight Democrats to the 119th United States Congress. Republican leaders in the state believe that they can flip three to five Democratic seats by further cracking Democratic-leaning areas, particularly in the Tampa Bay area, Greater Orlando, and the Miami metropolitan area, which returned one, two, and five Democrats in 2024 respectively.

Despite Democratic opposition, the new map was successfully passed and signed by DeSantis on May 4, 2026, following a special legislative session. On June 10, 2026, the Supreme Court of Florida allowed the new map to stay in effect for Florida's 2026 U.S. House elections.

== Legislative history ==
On January 7, 2026, DeSantis called a special session of the Florida Legislature for the purpose of redistricting the state's congressional maps, to take place in April. In order to accommodate a new map, Florida Secretary of State Cord Byrd moved the April qualifying date for the congressional primary to June.

On April 27, 2026, the day before the session's opening, DeSantis proposed a 24–4 congressional map to the Legislature. The map targets four incumbent Democrats: Kathy Castor (Tampa), Darren Soto (Orlando), Lois Frankel (West Palm Beach), and Debbie Wasserman Schultz (Ft. Lauderdale).

On April 28, 2026, Jason Poreda, a senior DeSantis staff member, testified that he drew the districts for the new map and admitted to viewing partisan data, but said this was only one factor in drawing the map.

On April 29, 2026, the Florida House of Representatives approved the map in an 83–28 vote, along party-lines, followed by the Florida Senate who approved the map in an 21-17 vote, largely along party-lines. Republican state senators Jennifer Bradley (Fleming Island), Alexis Calatayud (Miami), Ileana Garcia (Miami), and Erin Grall (Vero Beach) broke from party lines and voted against the map. Democratic state representative Angie Nixon (Jacksonville) briefly interrupted the vote with a megaphone, shouting “this is a violation of the Constitution.” Republican state representative Jenna Persons-Mulicka (Ft. Myers) acknowledged that the map does not align with Florida’s constitution, but stated that the map is based on a “viable legal theory” and that Florida has an “evolving legal landscape.” On the same day, the U.S. Supreme Court ruled in Louisiana v. Callais that the Voting Rights Act did not mandate majority-minority districts and that they are unconstitutional racial gerrymandering. DeSantis indicated he had advance knowledge of Supreme Court's decision.

On April 30, 2026, DeSantis stated he will sign the bill (HB 1-D) into law "as soon as I get it." He signed the bill on May 4, with a post on X saying, "signed, sealed, delivered".

House vote on HB 1D
April 29, 2026	Party		Total votes
April 29, 2026	Republican	Democratic	Total votes
Yea	81	2 (Note: Allison Tant and Marie Woodson, both by mistake.)	83
Nay	1 (Note: Hillary Cassel, a Democrat until 2024)	27	28
Absent	3	5	8
Result: Passed
State house roll call vote: Representative / Party / District / Residence / Vote; Michelle Salzman / Republican / 1st district / Pensacola / Yea; Alex Andrade / Republican / 2nd district / Pensacola / Yea; Nathan Boyles / Republican / 3rd district / Holt / Yea; Patt Maney / Republican / 4th district / Destin / Yea; Shane Abbott / Republican / 5th district / DeFuniak Springs / Yea; Philip Griffitts / Republican / 6th district / Panama City / Yea; Jason Shoaf / Republican / 7th district / Port St. Joe / Yea; Gallop Franklin / Democratic / 8th district / Tallahassee / Nay; Allison Tant / Democratic / 9th district / Tallahassee / Yea; Chuck Brannan / Republican / 10th district / Macclenny / Yea; Sam Garrison / Republican / 11th district / Fleming Island / Yea; Wyman Duggan / Republican / 12th district / Jacksonville / Yea; Angie Nixon / Democratic / 13th district / Jacksonville / Nay; Kimberly Daniels / Democratic / 14th district / Jacksonville / Absent; Dean Black / Republican / 15th district / Jacksonville / Yea; Kiyan Michael / Republican / 16th district / Jacksonville / Yea; Jessica Baker / Republican / 17th district / Orange Park / Yea; Kim Kendall / Republican / 18th district / St. Augustine / Yea; Sam Greco / Republican / 19th district / St. Augustine / Yea; Judson Sapp / Republican / 20th district / Palatka / Yea; Yvonne Hayes Hinson / Democratic / 21st district / Gainesville / Absent; Chad Johnson / Republican / 22nd district / Newberry / Yea; J.J. Grow / Republican / 23rd district / Lecanto / Yea; Ryan Chamberlin / Republican / 24th district / Belleview / Yea; Taylor Yarkosky / Republican / 25th district / Clermont / Yea; Nan Cobb / Republican / 26th district / Tavares / Yea; Richard Gentry / Republican / 27th district / Ocala / Yea; Bill Partington / Republican / 28th district / Ormond Beach / Yea; Webster Barnaby / Republican / 29th district / Deltona / Yea; Chase Tramont / Republican / 30th district / Port Orange / Yea; Tyler Sirois / Republican / 31st district / Merritt Island / Yea; Brian Hodgers / Republican / 32nd district / Melbourne / Yea; Monique Miller / Republican / 33rd district / Melbourne Beach / Yea; Robbie Brackett / Republican / 34th district / Vero Beach / Yea; Erika Booth / Republican / 35th district / St. Cloud / Yea; Rachel Plakon / Republican / 36th district / Longwood / Yea; Susan Plasencia / Republican / 37th district / Orlando / Yea; David Smith / Republican / 38th district / Winter Springs / Yea; Doug Bankson / Republican / 39th district / Apopka / Yea; RaShon Young / Democratic / 40th district / Orlando / Nay; Bruce Antone / Democratic / 41st district / Orlando / Nay; Anna V. Eskamani / Democratic / 42nd district / Orlando / Nay; Johanna López / Democratic / 43rd district / Orlando / Nay; Rita Harris / Democratic / 44th district / Orlando / Nay; Leonard Spencer / Democratic / 45th district / Gotha / Absent; Jose Alvarez / Democratic / 46th district / Kissimmee / Nay; Paula Stark / Republican / 47th district / St. Cloud / Yea; Jon Albert / Republican / 48th district / Winter Haven / Yea; Jennifer Kincart Jonsson / Republican / 49th district / Fort Meade / Yea; Jennifer Canady / Republican / 50th district / Lakeland / Yea; Hilary Holley / Republican / 51st district / Polk City / Yea; Samantha Scott / Republican / 52nd district / Bushnell / Yea; Jeff Holcomb / Republican / 53rd district / Spring Hill / Yea; Randy Maggard / Republican / 54th district / Zephyrhills / Yea; Kevin Steele / Republican / 55th district / Hudson / Yea; Brad Yeager / Republican / 56th district / New Port Richey / Absent; Adam Anderson / Republican / 57th district / Palm Harbor / Yea; Kim Berfield / Republican / 58th district / Clearwater / Yea; Berny Jacques / Republican / 59th district / Seminole / Yea; Lindsay Cross / Democratic / 60th district / St. Petersburg / Nay; Linda Chaney / Republican / 61st district / St. Pete Beach / Yea; Michele Rayner-Goolsby / Democratic / 62nd district / St. Petersburg / Nay; Dianne Hart / Democratic / 63rd district / Tampa / Nay; Susan Valdes / Republican / 64th district / Tampa / Yea; Karen Gonzalez Pittman / Republican / 65th district / Tampa / Yea; Traci Koster / Republican / 66th district / Tampa / Yea; Fentrice Driskell / Democratic / 67th district / Tampa / Nay; Lawrence McClure / Republican / 68th district / Dover / Yea; Danny Alvarez / Republican / 69th district / Brandon / Yea; Michael Owen / Republican / 70th district / Lithia / Yea; Will Robinson / Republican / 71st district / Bradenton / Yea; Bill Conerly / Republican / 72nd district / Lakewood Ranch / Yea; Fiona McFarland / Republican / 73rd district / Sarasota / Yea; James Buchanan / Republican / 74th district / Osprey / Yea; Danny Nix / Republican / 75th district / Port Charlotte / Yea; Vanessa Oliver / Republican / 76th district / North Fort Myers / Yea; Tiffany Esposito / Republican / 77th district / Fort Myers / Yea; Jenna Persons-Mulicka / Republican / 78th district / Fort Myers / Yea; Mike Giallombardo / Republican / 79th district / Cape Coral / Yea; Adam Botana / Republican / 80th district / Bonita Springs / Yea; Yvette Benarroch / Republican / 81st district / Naples / Yea; Lauren Melo / Republican / 82nd district / Naples / Yea; Kaylee Tuck / Republican / 83rd district / Sebring / Absent; Dana Trabulsy / Republican / 84th district / Fort Pierce / Yea; Toby Overdorf / Republican / 85th district / Palm City / Yea; John Snyder / Republican / 86th district / Stuart / Yea; Emily Gregory / Democratic / 87th district / Jupiter / Nay; Jervonte Edmonds / Democratic / 88th district / West Palm Beach / Nay; Debra Tendrich / Democratic / 89th district / West Palm Beach / Nay; Rob Long / Democratic / 90th district / Delray Beach / Nay; Peggy Gossett-Seidman / Republican / 91st district / Highland Beach / Yea; Kelly Skidmore / Democratic / 92nd district / Boca Raton / Nay; Anne Gerwig / Republican / 93rd district / Wellington / Yea; Meg Weinberger / Republican / 94th district / West Palm Beach / Yea; Christine Hunschofsky / Democratic / 95th district / Parkland / Nay; Dan Daley / Democratic / 96th district / Coral Springs / Nay; Lisa Dunkley / Democratic / 97th district / Sunrise / Nay; Mitch Rosenwald / Democratic / 98th district / Lauderdale Lakes / Absent; Daryl Campbell / Democratic / 99th district / Fort Lauderdale / Nay; Chip LaMarca / Republican / 100th district / Lighthouse Point / Yea; Hillary Cassel / Republican / 101st district / Hollywood / Nay; Michael Gottlieb / Democratic / 102nd district / Davie / Absent; Robin Bartleman / Democratic / 103rd district / Weston / Nay; Felicia Robinson / Democratic / 104th district / Miami Gardens / Nay; Marie Woodson / Democratic / 105th district / Hollywood / Yea; Fabián Basabe / Republican / 106th district / Miami Beach / Yea; Wallace Aristide / Democratic / 107th district / Miami Gardens / Nay; Dotie Joseph / Democratic / 108th district / North Miami / Nay; Ashley Gantt / Democratic / 109th district / Miami / Nay; Tom Fabricio / Republican / 110th district / Miami Lakes / Yea; David Borrero / Republican / 111th district / Sweetwater / Yea; Alex Rizo / Republican / 112th district / Hialeah / Absent; Vacant / / 113th district / Miami; Demi Busatta / Republican / 114th district / Coral Gables / Yea; Omar Blanco / Republican / 115th district / Miami / Yea; Daniel Perez / Republican / 116th district / Miami / Yea; Kevin Chambliss / Democratic / 117th district / Florida City / Nay; Mike Redondo / Republican / 118th district / Miami / Yea; Juan Carlos Porras / Republican / 119th district / Miami / Yea; Jim Mooney / Republican / 120th district / Islamorada / Yea; Michael Gottlieb (D–102), Hayes Hinson (D–21), and Mitch Rosenwald (D–98) voted Nay after the roll call; Allison Tant (D–9) and Marie Woodson (D–105) switched their Yea votes to Nay after the roll call. Map of state house roll call vote Republican yea Democratic yea Democratic nay Democratic Nay after roll call Nonvoting Vacant

Senate vote on HB 1D
April 29, 2026	Party			Total votes
April 29, 2026	Republican	Democratic	Independent	Total votes
Yea	21	0	0	21
Nay	4	12	1	17
Absent	2	0	0	2
Result: Passed
State senate roll call vote: Senator / Party / District / Residence / Vote; Don Gaetz / Republican / 1st district / Crestview / Yea; Jay Trumbull / Republican / 2nd district / Panama City / Yea; Corey Simon / Republican / 3rd district / Tallahassee / Yea; Clay Yarborough / Republican / 4th district / Jacksonville / Yea; Tracie Davis / Democratic / 5th district / Jacksonville / Nay; Jennifer Bradley / Republican / 6th district / Fleming Island / Nay; Tom Leek / Republican / 7th district / Ormond Beach / Absent; Tom Wright / Republican / 8th district / New Smyrna Beach / Yea; Stan McClain / Republican / 9th district / Summerfield / Yea; Jason Brodeur / Republican / 10th district / Sanford / Yea; Ralph Massullo / Republican / 11th district / Lecanto / Yea; Colleen Burton / Republican / 12th district / Lakeland / Yea; Keith Truenow / Republican / 13th district / Tavares / Yea; Brian Nathan / Democratic / 14th district / Tampa / Nay; LaVon Bracy Davis / Democratic / 15th district / Ocoee / Nay; Darryl Rouson / Democratic / 16th district / St. Petersburg / Nay; Carlos Smith / Democratic / 17th district / Orlando / Nay; Nick DiCeglie / Republican / 18th district / Indian Rocks Beach / Yea; Debbie Mayfield / Republican / 19th district / Indialantic / Yea; Jim Boyd / Republican / 20th district / Bradenton / Yea; Ed Hooper / Republican / 21st district / Clearwater / Yea; Joe Gruters / Republican / 22nd district / Sarasota / Absent; Danny Burgess / Republican / 23rd district / Zephyrhills / Yea; Mack Bernard / Democratic / 24th district / West Palm Beach / Nay; Kristen Arrington / Democratic / 25th district / Orlando / Nay; Lori Berman / Democratic / 26th district / Lantana / Nay; Ben Albritton / Republican / 27th district / Wauchula / Yea; Kathleen Passidomo / Republican / 28th district / Naples / Yea; Erin Grall / Republican / 29th district / Vero Beach / Nay; Tina Polsky / Democratic / 30th district / Boca Raton / Nay; Gayle Harrell / Republican / 31st district / Stuart / Yea; Rosalind Osgood / Democratic / 32nd district / Fort Lauderdale / Nay; Jonathan Martin / Republican / 33rd district / Fort Myers / Yea; Shevrin Jones / Democratic / 34th district / West Park / Nay; Barbara Sharief / Democratic / 35th district / Plantation / Nay; Ileana Garcia / Republican / 36th district / Miami / Nay; Jason Pizzo / Independent / 37th district / North Miami Beach / Nay; Alexis Calatayud / Republican / 38th district / Miami / Nay; Bryan Avila / Republican / 39th district / Hialeah / Yea; Ana Maria Rodriguez / Republican / 40th district / Doral / Yea; Map of state senate roll call vote Republican yea Democratic nay Republican nay Independent nay Nonvoting

== Partisan breakdown of the new congressional map ==
Expected partisan gains under the new map using 2024 presidential election results: Republican gain Republican hold / Democratic hold

District	Incumbent	2024 U.S. presidential result		Notional outcome	2026 result
District	Incumbent	2022 map	New map	Notional outcome	2026 result
1st district	Jimmy Patronis (R)	+38.98%	+38.98%	Rep. hold	Rep. hold
2nd district	Neal Dunn (R)	+18.07%	+18.07%	Rep. hold	Rep. hold
3rd district	Kat Cammack (R)	+20.99%	+20.99%	Rep. hold	Rep. hold
4th district	Aaron Bean (R)	+11.80%	+11.80%	Rep. hold	Rep. hold
5th district	John Rutherford (R)	+21.34%	+21.34%	Rep. hold	Rep. hold
6th district	Randy Fine (R)	+29.99%	+29.99%	Rep. hold	Rep. hold
7th district	Cory Mills (R)	+12.42%	+12.42%	Rep. hold	Rep. hold
8th district	Mike Haridopolos (R)	+22.24%	+16.14%	Rep. hold	Rep. hold
9th district	Darren Soto (D)	−3.50%	+17.71%	Rep. gain	Dem. hold
10th district	Maxwell Frost (D)	−22.62%	−23.89%	Dem. hold	Dem. hold
11th district	Daniel Webster (R)	+16.20%	+15.63%	Rep. hold	Rep. hold
12th district	Gus Bilirakis (R)	+34.46%	+15.33%	Rep. hold	Rep. hold
13th district	Anna Paulina Luna (R)	+11.81%	+13.26%	Rep. hold	Rep. hold
14th district	Kathy Castor (D)	−7.64%	+10.47%	Rep. gain	Dem. hold
15th district	Laurel Lee (R)	+11.15%	+19.77%	Rep. hold	Rep. hold
16th district	Vern Buchanan (R)	+15.40%	+13.64%	Rep. hold	Rep. hold
17th district	Greg Steube (R)	+23.84%	+22.00%	Rep. hold	Rep. hold
18th district	Scott Franklin (R)	+29.31%	+16.90%	Rep. hold	Rep. hold
19th district	Byron Donalds (R)	+29.04%	+30.08%	Rep. hold	Rep. hold
20th district	Vacant	−39.49%	−37.06%	Dem. hold	Dem. hold
21st district	Brian Mast (R)	+16.50%	+16.17%	Rep. hold	Rep. hold
22nd district	Lois Frankel (D)	−5.55%	+10.47%	Rep. gain	Dem. hold
23rd district	Jared Moskowitz (D)	−1.90%	−13.77%	Dem. hold	Dem. hold
24th district	Frederica Wilson (D)	−29.95%	−38.62%	Dem. hold	Dem. hold
25th district	Debbie Wasserman Schultz (D)	−5.31%	+9.11%	Rep. gain	Dem. hold
26th district	Mario Díaz-Balart (R)	+34.86%	+18.32%	Rep. hold	Rep. hold
27th district	María Elvira Salazar (R)	+14.61%	+14.53%	Rep. hold	Rep. hold
28th district	Carlos A. Giménez (R)	+25.34%	+25.39%	Rep. hold	Rep. hold

== Legality ==
On November 2, 2010, Florida voters approved a constitutional referendum, the Fair Districts Amendment, to make partisan gerrymandering unconstitutional. The Florida Constitution was amended to include Article III, Section 20, which states:

Section 20. STANDARDS FOR ESTABLISHING CONGRESSIONAL DISTRICT BOUNDARIES

In establishing Congressional district boundaries:

1. No apportionment plan or individual district shall be drawn with the intent to favor or disfavor a political party or an incumbent; and districts shall not be drawn with the intent or result of denying or abridging the equal opportunity of racial or language minorities to participate in the political process or to diminish their ability to elect representatives of their choice; and districts shall consist of contiguous territory.
2. Unless compliance with the standards in this subsection conflicts with the standards in subsection (1) or with federal law, districts shall be as nearly equal in population as is practicable; districts shall be compact; and districts shall, where feasible, utilize existing political and geographical boundaries.
3. The order in which the standards within sub-sections (1) and (2) of this section are set forth shall not be read to establish any priority of one standard over the other within that subsection.

Less than 24 hours since DeSantis signed the new map into law on May 4, 2026, multiple lawsuits by voting rights groups were filed, arguing that the new map violates the Fair Districts Amendment. The lawsuits were consolidated into one case overseen by Judge Joshua Hawkes in Leon County, Florida. On May 26, Judge Hawkes denied a preliminary injunction on the grounds that the election's filing deadline was too close for further changes. In his decision, Judge Hawkes wrote:

To the extent the Court has to balance Florida’s [Fair Districts Amendment’s] prohibition of improper partisan intent and the United States Constitution’s Equal Protection guarantees, it seems clear that the potential partisan intent in the 2026 map is the lesser of the two evils.

Judge Hawkes also cited the Purcell principle, a judicial doctrine established by the U.S. Supreme Court advising courts to not change election rules in the lead-up to elections. On May 26, the plaintiffs appealed Judge Hawkes decision to the Florida First District Court of Appeals. On June 10, the Florida Supreme Court denied for lack of jurisdiction an emergency petition to hear the case; Justice Jorge Labarga is the lone dissenter. Justice Adam Tanenbaum wrote a concurring opinion, stating:

The people of Florida can rest assured that elections will take place this year—under a redistricting law and an election code enacted by their Legislature, all as administered by various, capable state and local election officials—following which they will have their duly apportioned allotment of elected representatives in Congress. In the meantime, the plaintiffs will have their days in court, in due course, to be heard on the merits of their challenge to the new redistricting law—all in comportment with the reformed judicial system established by the people through their constitution.

Although the lawsuits are ongoing, the new map will be used in the 2026 U.S. House elections as the federal qualifying deadline for candidates passed on June 12, leaving the courts no time to make a ruling. DeSantis wrote on X that "The Florida Supreme Court has REJECTED the challenge to the state's redistricting plan and new map." Florida Attorney General James Uthemeier called the decision a "complete and total victory." However, Equal Ground, one of the plaintiffs, stated "Let’s be clear, the Florida Supreme Court’s failure to stop this brazen partisan power grab is not only an assault on democracy, but an abdication of its duty to the people of Florida."

== Reactions ==
=== Support ===
The DeSantis administration has stated that the new map corrects issues found in the 2020 U.S. Census and addresses Florida's population growth between 2020 and 2025.

Additionally, state officials have proclaimed that the new map resolves unconstitutional racial gerrymandering. Republican lawyers have argued that the redistricting map aligns Florida with the ruling in Louisiana v. Callais which raised the threshold for lines drawn with race as a motivating factor to strict scrutiny, and that the Florida Constitution's Fair Districts Amendment does not meet the new burden.

=== Criticism ===
Political commentators and officials have warned that drawing too aggressive of a gerrymander comes with the risk of diluting Republican majorities and creating more tossup districts to a point that, with a particularly strong swing, Democrats could end up gaining seats in a situation known as a dummymander. DeSantis has shared this concern.

Polling of Florida voters has shown that a majority oppose mid-decade political gerrymandering, including most independents and a sizable portion of Republican voters. DeSantis shared a concern of voter backlash following Democrat Taylor Rehmet's upset victory in a Texas state election.

Some political commentators questioned the DeSantis administration's claims that redistricting fixes alleged census errors.

Democratic lawyers argued that no court has ever found issues in racial gerrymandering with the prior districting map or the Florida Constitution's Fair Districts Amendment.

On May 14, 2026, Democratic state representative Angie Nixon was reprimanded by the Florida House Rules & Ethics Committee for "disruptive behavior" during the House floor vote on the new map for her use of a megaphone to interrupt the vote. The following day, on May 15, Nixon was arrested for trespassing after staging a five-hour sit-in protest inside DeSantis's office at the Florida State Capitol; Nixon was booked into the Leon County Jail and later released. DeSantis labeled the sit-in as "performative nonsense."

== Aftermath ==
Despite redistricting, all 4 Democrats targeted survived re-election in 2026, due to the strong Democratic environment.

However, given this environment, incumbent Republicans Anna Luna (FL-13) and Laurel Lee (FL-15) may have lost reelection in the previous version of their districts. As it happened, they each benefited from the gerrymander, and their seats were prevented from flipping to a Democratic challenger.

== See also ==
- 2025 California Proposition 50 – US state constitutional amendment
- 2026 Missouri Proposition A – Veto referendum on congressional districts
- 2025 Texas redistricting – Mid-decade change to congressional district boundaries
- 2026 Virginia redistricting referendum – Voided change to Virginia's congressional districts
