= 2026–2028 Florida Legislature =

2026–2028 Florida legislative term

←	2024–2026
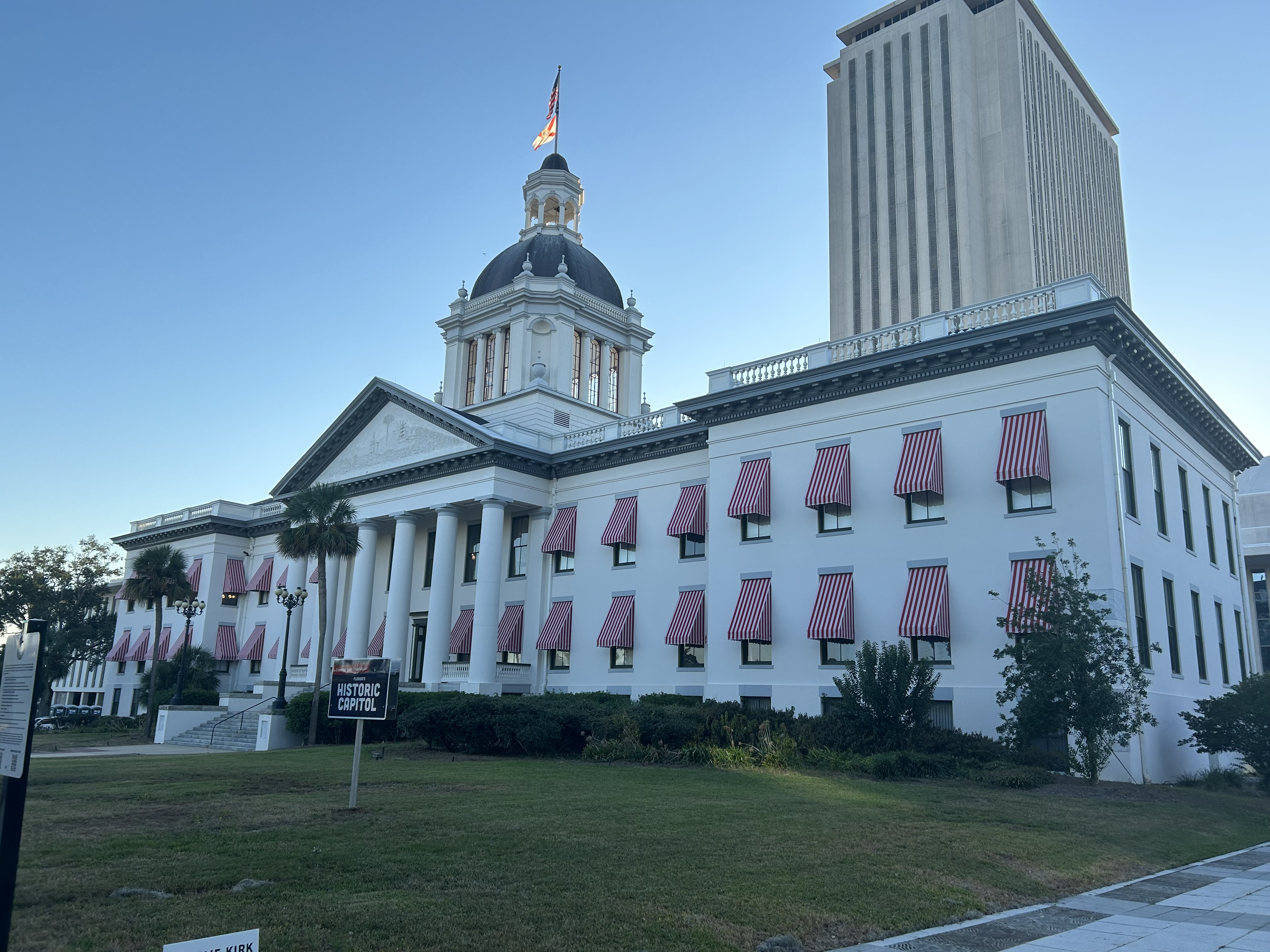
- Florida State Capitol (2025)

Overview
- Legislative body: Florida Legislature
- Jurisdiction: Florida
- Term: March 12, 2027 –

Senate
- Members: 40
- President: Jim Boyd (R)
- Party control: Republican

House of Representatives
- Members: 120
- Speaker: Sam Garrison (R)
- Party control: Republican

Sessions
- 1st: March 12, 2027 – April 30, 2027
- 2nd: January 11, 2028 – March 10, 2028

The 2026–2028 Florida Legislature session is the next scheduled legislative session of the Florida Legislature. It will convene on March 12, 2027, during the first two years of Byron Donalds governorship.

== Party summary ==
=== Senate party summary ===
	Party (shading shows control)			Total	Vacant
	Democratic	Independent	Republican	Total	Vacant
End of previous Legislature	12	1	26	39	1
Begin (March 12, 2027)	13	1	26	40	0
Current voting share	32.5%	2.5%	65%		

=== House party summary ===
	Party (shading shows control)			Total	Vacant
	Democratic	Independent	Republican	Total	Vacant
End of previous Legislature	34	0	82	116	4
Begin (March 12, 2027)	50	0	70	120	0
Current voting share	41.67%	0%	58.33%		

== Leadership ==
=== Senate leadership ===
Senate presiding officers

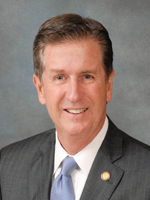
Jim Boyd (R),
President of the Senate

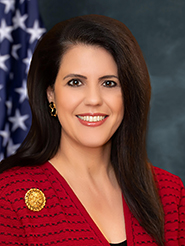
Ana Maria Rodriguez (R),
President pro tempore

==== Senate presiding officers ====
- President of the Senate: Jim Boyd (R)
- President pro tempore: Ana Maria Rodriguez (R)

==== Senate majority (Republican) leadership ====
- Majority Leader: Nick DiCeglie
- Majority Whip: TBD

==== Senate minority (Democratic) leadership ====
- Minority Leader: Tracie Davis
- Minority Whip:

=== House leadership ===
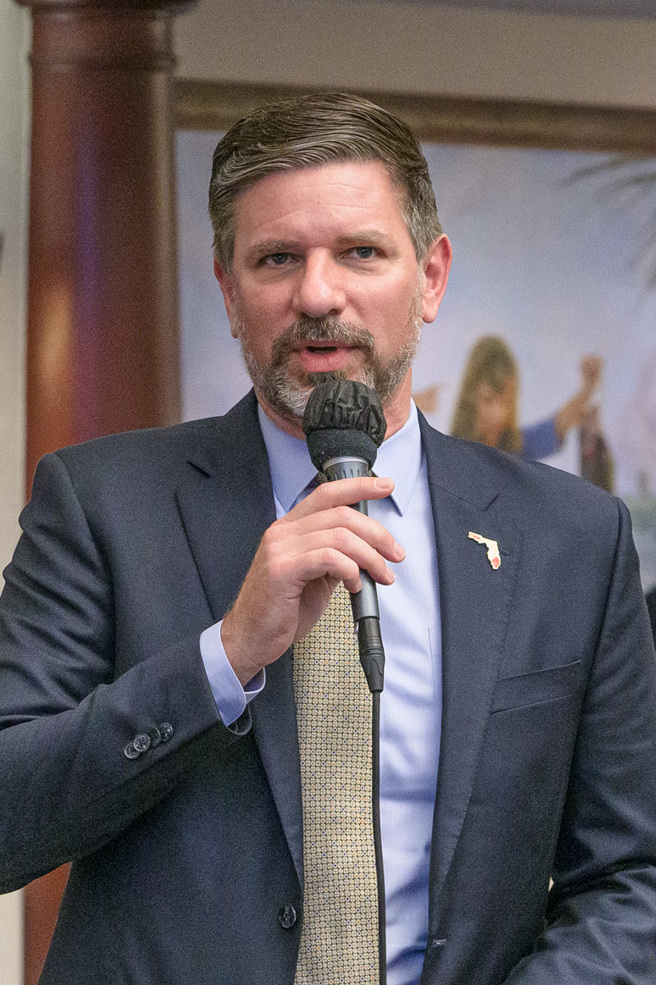
Speaker of the House Sam Garrison (R)

==== House presiding officer ====
- Speaker: Sam Garrison (R)
- Speaker pro tempore: Demi Busatta (R)

==== House majority (Republican) leadership ====
- Majority Leader: Randy Maggard
- Majority Whip: TBD

==== House minority (Democratic) leadership ====
- Minority Leader: Christine Hunschofsky
- Minority Whip: TBD

== Members ==
=== Senate ===
▌1. Don Gaetz (R)
▌2. Jay Trumbull (R)
▌3. Corey Simon (R)
▌4. Clay Yarborough (R)
▌5. Tracie Davis (D)
▌6. Jennifer Bradley (R)
▌7. Tom Leek (R)
▌8. Jake Johansson (R)
▌9. Stan McClain (R)
▌10. John Lowndes (D)
▌11. Ralph Massullo (R)
▌12. Colleen Burton (R)
▌13. Keith Truenow (R)
▌14. Brian Nathan (D)
▌15. LaVon Bracy Davis (D)
▌16. Fentrice Driskell (D)
▌17. Carlos Smith (D)
▌18. Nick DiCeglie (R)
▌19. Debbie Mayfield (R)
▌20. Jim Boyd (R)

▌21. Chris Nocco (R)
▌22. James Buchanan (R)
▌23. Danny Burgess (R)
▌24. Mack Bernard (D)
▌25. Kristen Arrington (D)
▌26. David Silvers (D)
▌27. Ben Albritton (R)
▌28. Lauren Melo (R)
▌29. Erin Grall (R)
▌30. Lauren Book (D)
▌31. Gayle Harrell (R)
▌32. Rosalind Osgood (D)
▌33. Jonathan Martin (R)
▌34. Ashley Gantt (D)
▌35. Barbara Sharief (D)
▌36. Ileana Garcia (R)
▌37. Jason Pizzo (I)
▌38. TBD (R)
▌39. Vacant (R)
▌40. Ana Maria Rodriguez (R)

=== House ===
▌1. Michelle Salzman (R)
▌2. Jon Fay (R)
▌3. Nathan Boyles (R)
▌4. Patt Maney (R)
▌5. Shane Abbott (R)
▌6. Tricia Berry (R)
▌7. Jason Shoaf (R)
▌8. Gallop Franklin (D)
▌9. Allison Tant (D)
▌10. Marshall Rawson (R)
▌11. Sam Garrison (R)
▌12. Terrance Freeman (R)
▌13. (D)
▌14. (D)
▌15. (R)
▌16. (R)
▌17. (R)
▌18. (R)
▌19. (R)
▌20. (R)
▌21. (D)
▌22. (D)
▌23. (R)
▌24. (R)
▌25. (R)
▌26. (R)
▌27. (R)
▌28. (R)
▌29. (R)
▌30. (R)

▌31. (R)
▌32. (R)
▌33. (D)
▌34. (R)
▌35. (D)
▌36. (D)
▌37. (D)
▌38. (D)
▌39. (D)
▌40. (D)
▌41. (D)
▌42. (D)
▌43. (D)
▌44. (D)
▌45. (D)
▌46. (D)
▌47. (D)
▌48. (R)
▌49. (R)
▌50. (R)
▌51. (D)
▌52. (R)
▌53. (R)
▌54. (R)
▌55. (R)
▌56. (R)
▌57. (R)
▌58. (R)
▌59. (R)
▌60. (D)

▌61. (R)
▌62. (D)
▌63. (D)
▌64. (D)
▌65. (R)
▌66. (R)
▌67. (D)
▌68. (R)
▌69. (D)
▌70. (R)
▌71. (R)
▌72. (R)
▌73. (R)
▌74. (R)
▌75. (R)
▌76. (R)
▌77. (R)
▌78. (R)
▌79. (R)
▌80. (R)
▌81. (R)
▌82. (R)
▌83. (R)
▌84. (R)
▌85. (R)
▌86. (R)
▌87. (R)
▌88. (D)
▌89. (D)
▌90. (D)

▌91. (R)
▌92. (D)
▌93. (D)
▌94. (D)
▌95. (D)
▌96. (D)
▌97. (D)
▌98. (D)
▌99. (D)
▌100. (D)
▌101. (D)
▌102. (D)
▌103. (D)
▌104. (D)
▌105. (D)
▌106. (D)
▌107. (D)
▌108. (D)
▌109. (D)
▌110. (R)
▌111. (R)
▌112. (R)
▌113. (D)
▌114. (R)
▌115. (R)
▌116. (R)
▌117. (D)
▌118. (R)
▌119. (R)
▌120. (R)

== Elections ==
- 2026 Florida elections (elections leading to this Legislature)
  - 2026 Florida Senate election
  - 2026 Florida House of Representatives election
