= Republican Party of Florida =

Florida affiliate of the Republican Party

- Chairperson: Evan Power
- Governor: Ron DeSantis
- Senate President: Ben Albritton
- Speaker of the House: Daniel Perez
- Senate Majority Leader: Jim Boyd
- Florida House Majority Leader: Tyler Sirois
- Founded: 1867; 159 years ago
- Headquarters: 420 E. Jefferson Street; Tallahassee, Florida 32301
- Student wing: Florida College Republicans
- Youth wing: Florida Young Republicans; Florida Teen Age Republicans
- Women's wing: Florida Federation of Republican Women
- Membership (February 28, 2026): ▲5,535,837
- Ideology: Conservatism
- National affiliation: Republican Party
- Colors: Red
- Florida Senate: 26 / 40
- Florida House of Representatives: 86 / 120
- Statewide Executive Offices: 6 / 6
- United States Senate: 2 / 2 (Florida seats)
- United States House of Representatives: 20 / 28 (Florida seats)

Election symbol

Website
- www.florida.gop

The Republican Party of Florida (RPOF), also called the Florida Republican Party, is the affiliate of the Republican Party in the U.S. state of Florida. It is currently the state's dominant party, controlling 20 out of 28 of Florida's United States House of Representatives seats, both United States Senate seats, the Governor of Florida and all other statewide offices, and has supermajorities in both houses of the state legislature.

The Republican Party held power in state politics during the Reconstruction era after the American Civil War and included African American legislators and officials. Democrats regained power in Florida and across the South until the 1960s.

== History ==
Several of Florida's governors and U.S. senators were Republican after the Civil War during the Reconstruction era. There were Republican African American officeholders from the end of the Civil War until before 1900 in Florida. The Republican Convention of 1867 in Tallahassee was the first statewide convention of Republicans. Josiah T. Walls was a delegate to the convention.

Harrison Reed organized the Union Republican Club in Jacksonville and sent a delegation to the National Union National Convention in 1864. After the American Civil War black Republicans mainly joined the Union League organized by Daniel Richards and William U. Saunders. Richards was able to have pro-black rights resolutions passed at conventions. Reed stated they were "pandering to Negroes".

Richards, Saunders, and Liberty Billings campaigned for black support for the 1868 Florida Constitutional Convention. Edward McPherson, Clerk of the United States House of Representatives withdrew printing contracts from the "Radical Republican" supporting Jacksonville Florida Times, it later went bankrupt, instead supporting the moderate Florida Union. Richards accused Freedmen's Bureau officials of working against him.

Richards and Saunders' wing controlled a majority of the delegates at the constitutional convention. They submitted their proposed constitution to George Meade and held a nomination convention that selected a gubernatorial ticket of Billings and Saunders and Jonathan Clarkson Gibbs for Florida's at-large congressional district. However, Reed's faction, claiming that the Radicals did not have a quorum, held another meeting and received support from Meade, who later approved their constitution. The Radical's constitution made most local and state offices elected while the moderate's constitution made those offices appointed and reduce representation of black counties in the state legislature. The Florida Radicals failed to gather support in Congress for their constitution, with even Benjamin Butler supporting the moderate's constitution. The constitution was approved by voters in 1868.

Democrats regained control of Florida's state politics and across the South. Their control lasted until 1966 when Claude R. Kirk, Jr. was elected. He became the first Republican governor elected in the state since the 19th century Reconstruction era. Since 1960, the state only voted Democratic in the presidential elections in 1964 (Lyndon B. Johnson), 1976 (Jimmy Carter), 1996 (Bill Clinton), 2008 and 2012 (Barack Obama). The 2000 presidential election was decided by a margin of 537 votes out of approximately 6 million cast, giving George W. Bush the presidency over Al Gore. Richard Nixon's Southern Strategy, which took advantage of objections to the advances of the American Civil Rights Movement. This resulted in a regional political realignment for the Southern United States. The number of people registered with the party rose from 116,000 in 1952 to 1,139,000 in 1976.

The Florida Senate was still dominated by Democrats until 1992, when a majority of Republicans was elected. The Florida House of Representatives turned Republican after the November 1996 election. Since then, the number of Democrats in both chambers have continued to drop.

The Florida Legislature became the first legislature in any of the states of the former Confederacy to come under complete Republican control when the Republicans gained control of the House and Senate in the 1996 election. In the 2006 election the Democrats actually gained seats in the State House, the first instance of this occurring since the early 1980s.

== Structure and composition ==
In the 2014 gubernatorial election, the Republican nominee was Governor Rick Scott. He defeated the Democratic nominee, former governor Charlie Crist, who was once elected as a Republican.

The Chairman of the Republican Party of Florida is Evan Power, elected by RPOF members in January 2024.

The Republican National Committee (RNC) is responsible for promoting Republican campaign activities, developing and promoting the Republican political platform, as well as coordinating fundraising and election strategy. Senator Mel Martinez of Florida is the party's former General Chairman. Michael Whatley is the current Chairman of RNC. The chairman of the RNC is chosen by the President when the Republicans have the White House and otherwise by the Party's state committees. The RNC, under the direction of the party's presidential candidate, supervises the Republican National Convention, raises funds, and coordinates campaign strategy. On the local level there are similar state committees in every state and most large cities, counties and legislative districts, but they have far less money and influence than the national body.

The Republican House and Senate caucuses have separate fund raising and strategy committees. The National Republican Congressional Committee (NRCC) assists in House races, and the National Republican Senatorial Committee (NRSC) in Senate races. They each raise over $100 million per election cycle, and play important roles in recruiting strong state candidates. The Republican Governors Association (RGA) is a discussion group that seldom funds state races.

== Ideology ==
The membership of the party is primarily made up of fiscal conservatives, social conservatives, neoconservatives, and members of the Christian right.

=== Economic policies ===
Republicans favor free-market policies supporting business and oppose increases to the minimum wage.

Republicans are generally opposed to a single-payer healthcare system, such as that found in Canada or in most of Europe. They also oppose the Affordable Care Act and the expansion of Medicaid under the Act.

Republicans oppose labor unions and have supported right-to-work legislation (with a right-to-work law currently in effect in Florida).

=== Social policies ===
Most of the Republicans' national and state candidates oppose abortion, same-sex marriage, and transgender rights, favor capital punishment (which is still used in Florida), and support gun ownership rights.

Republicans advocate for charter schools and school vouchers; many have denounced the performance of public schools.

Socially conservative Republicans support voluntary organized prayer in public schools and the inclusion of teaching creationism or intelligent design alongside evolution.

== Symbols and name ==
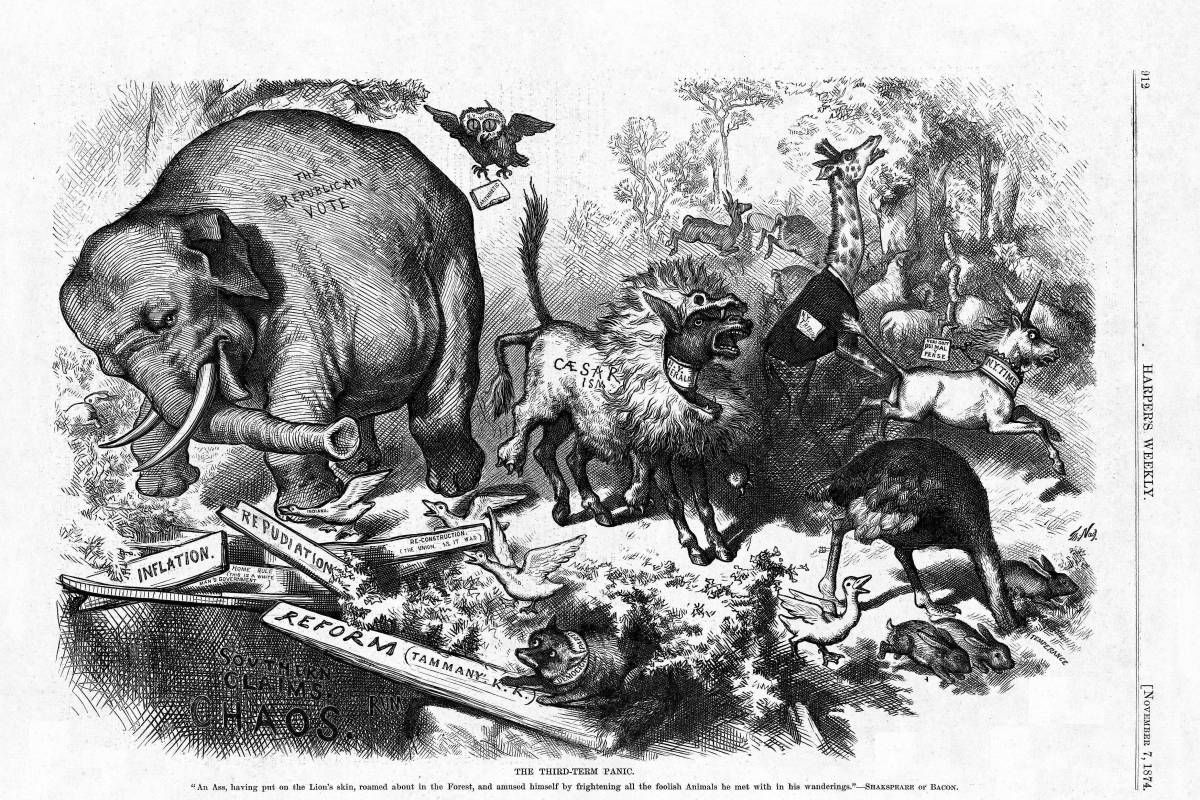
1874 Nast cartoon depicted GOP as an elephant demolishing the flimsy planks of the Democrats

The mascot symbol, historically, is the elephant. A political cartoon by Thomas Nast, published in Harper's Weekly on November 7, 1874, is considered the first important use of the symbol. In the early 20th century, the usual symbol of the Republican Party in Midwestern states such as Indiana and Ohio was the eagle, as opposed to the Democratic rooster. This symbol still appears on Indiana ballots.

After the 2000 election, the color red became associated with the GOP although it has not been officially adopted by the party. On election night 2000, for the first time ever, all major broadcast networks utilized the same color scheme for the electoral map: red states for George W. Bush (Republican nominee) and blue states for Al Gore (Democratic nominee). Although the color red is unofficial and informal, it is widely recognized by the media and the public to represent the GOP. Partisan supporters now often use the color red for promotional materials and campaign merchandise.

Lincoln Day, Reagan Day, or Lincoln-Reagan Day, is the primary annual fundraising celebration held by many state and county organizations of the Republican Party. The events are named after Republican Presidents Abraham Lincoln and Ronald Reagan.

== Current elected officials ==
As of 2023, the party controls both U.S. Senate seats, 20 out of the 28 seats Florida is apportioned in the U.S. House, all statewide offices, and both chambers of the Florida state legislature.

Florida Republicans have consistently won gubernatorial elections in the state since 1998.

=== Member of Congress ===
==== U.S. Senate ====
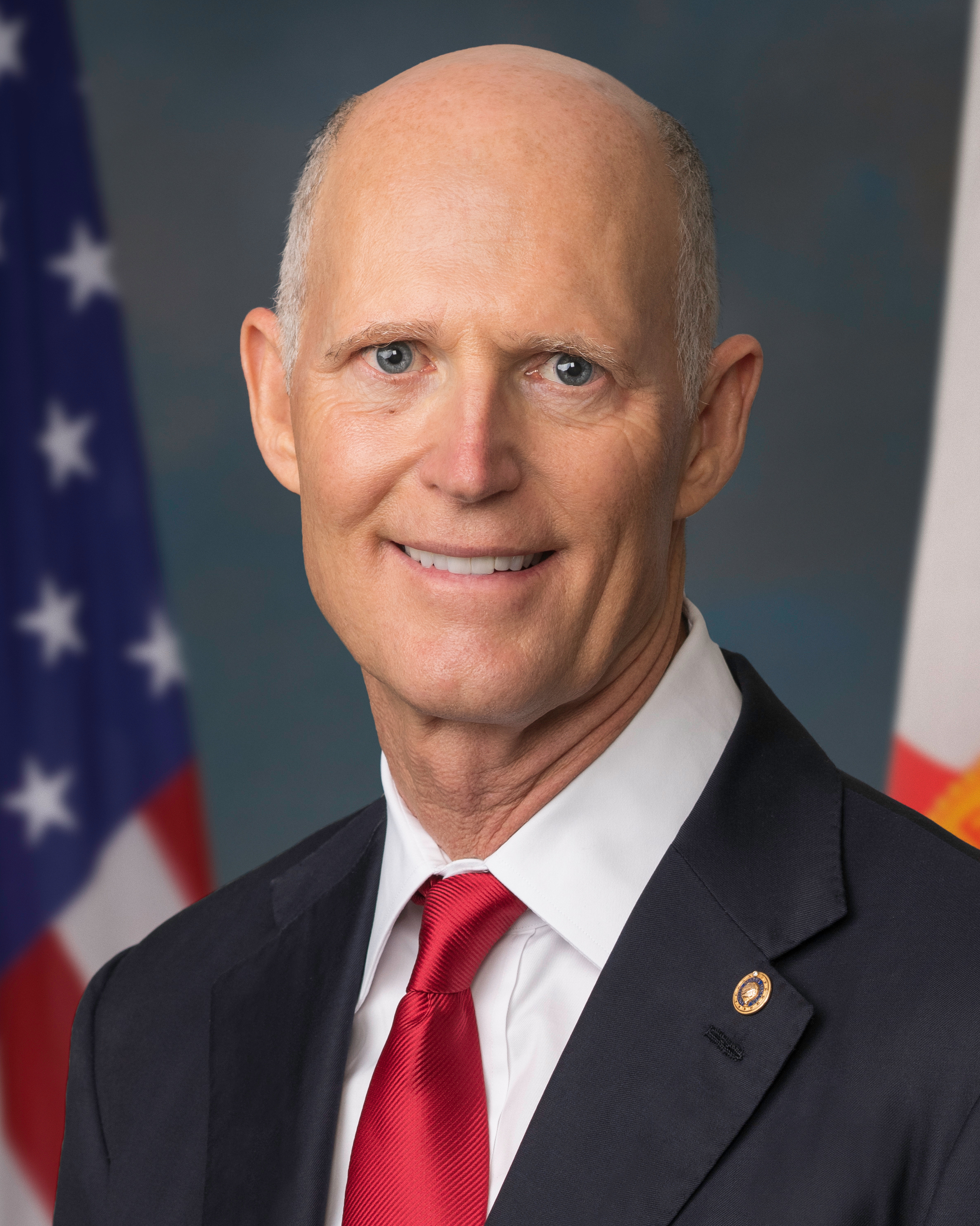
Senior U.S. Senator Rick Scott

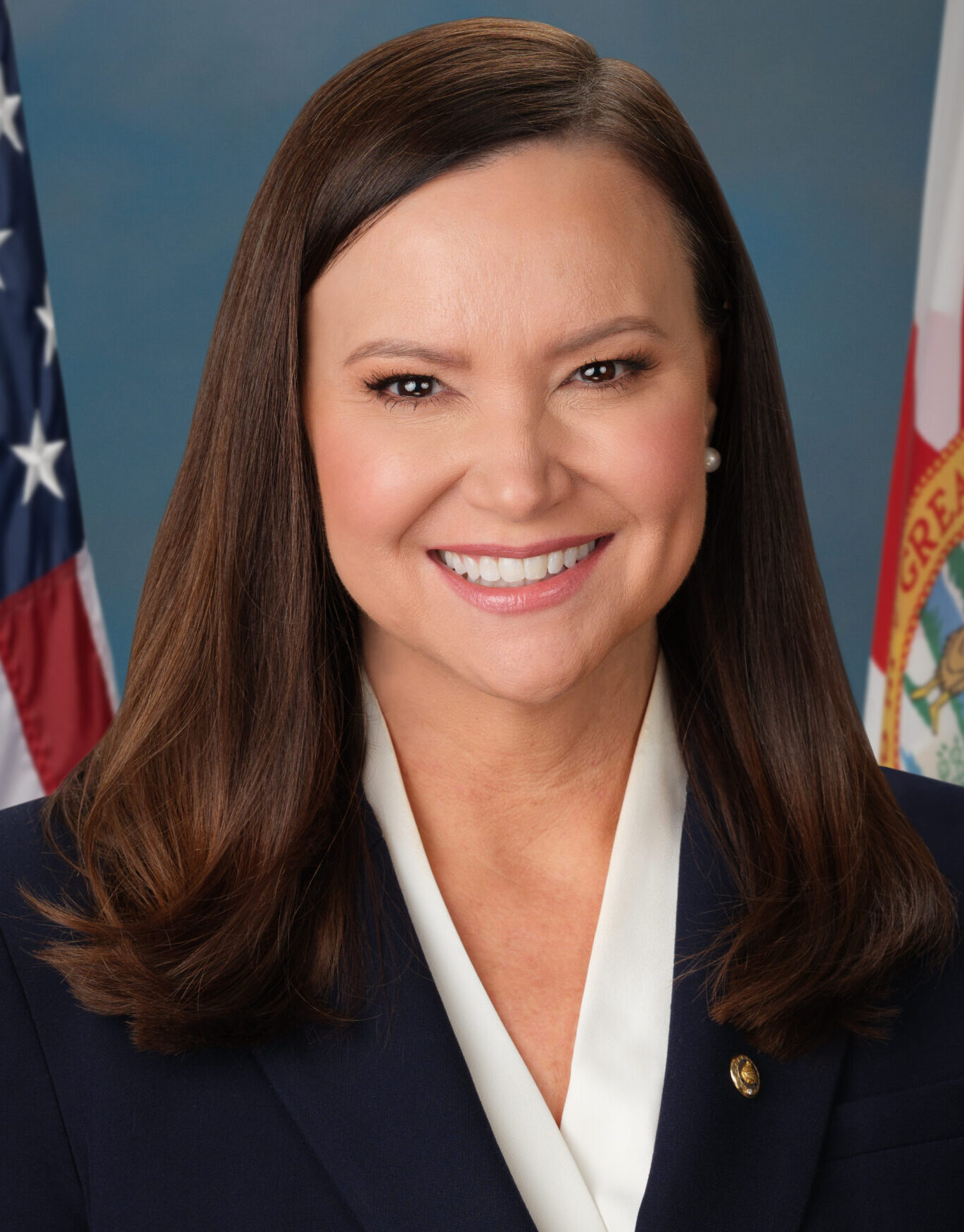
Junior U.S. Senator Ashley Moody

==== U.S. House of Representatives ====
Out of the 28 seats Florida is apportioned in the U.S. House of Representatives, 20 are held by Republicans:

District	Member	Photo
1st	Jimmy Patronis	
2nd	Neal Dunn	
3rd	Kat Cammack	
4th	Aaron Bean	
5th	John Rutherford	
6th	Randy Fine	
7th	Cory Mills	
7th	Ryan Elijah (elect)	
8th	Mike Haridopolos	
11th	Daniel Webster	
11th	Joe Strada (elect)	
12th	Gus Bilirakis	
13th	Anna Paulina Luna	
15th	Laurel Lee	
16th	Vern Buchanan	
16th	Sydney Gruters (elect)	
17th	Greg Steube	
18th	Scott Franklin	
19th	Byron Donalds	
19th	Jim Schwartzel (elect)	
21st	Brian Mast	
26th	Mario Díaz-Balart	
27th	María Elvira Salazar	
28th	Carlos A. Giménez	

=== State ===
==== Statewide offices ====
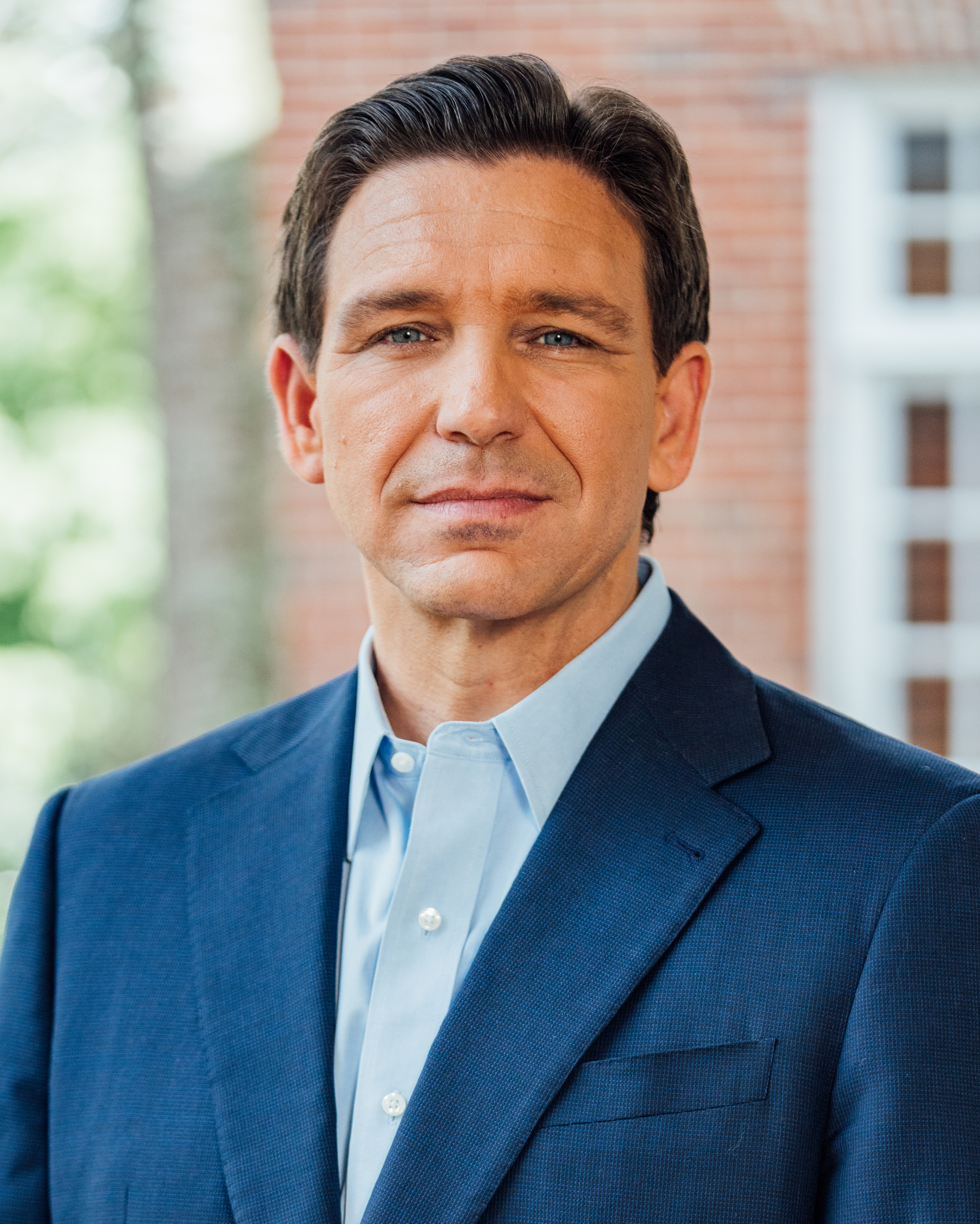
Governor Ron DeSantis

- Governor: Ron DeSantis → Byron Donalds (elect)
- Lieutenant Governor: Jay Collins → Bryan Avila (elect)
- Attorney General: James Uthmeier
- CFO: Blaise Ingoglia
- Commissioner of Agriculture: Wilton Simpson

==== State legislative leaders ====
- Senate president: Ben Albritton
- Senate president pro tempore: Jason Brodeur
- Senate majority leader: Jim Boyd
- House speaker: Daniel Perez
- House speaker pro tempore: Wyman Duggan
- House majority leader: Tyler Sirois

==== State Senate ====
Republicans hold a 28-seat majority in the 40-member Florida Senate.

==== State House ====
Republicans hold an 86-seat majority in the 120-member Florida House of Representatives.

== Former Florida governors and U.S. senators ==
=== Governors ===
Photo	Former governors of Florida
	Harrison Reed
	Ossian Hart
	Marcellus Stearns
	Claude Kirk
	Bob Martinez
	Jeb Bush
	Charlie Crist
	Rick Scott

=== United States senators ===
Photo	Former U.S. senators from Florida
	Marco Rubio
	George LeMieux
	Mel Martinez
	Connie Mack III
	Paula Hawkins
	Edward Gurney
	Simon Conover
	Abijah Gilbert
	Thomas Osborn
	Adonijah Welch

== RPOF Chairs ==
- C. H. McNulty (1936–1942)
- Cyril C. Spades (1942–1950)
- G. Harold Alexander (1950–1962)
- Tom Fairfield Brown (1962–1966)
- William F. Murfin (1966–1969)
- Duke Crittenden (1969–1971)
- L. E. Thomas (1971–1974)
- Bill Taylor (1974–1980)
- Henry Sayler (1980–1984)
- Jeanie Austin (1984–1989)
- Van Poole (1989–1993)
- Tom Slade (1993–1999)
- Al Cárdenas (1999–2003)
- Carole Jean Jordan (2003–2006)
- Jim Greer (2006–2010)
- John Thrasher (2010–2011)
- David Bitner (2011)
- Lenny Curry (2011–2014)
- Leslie Dougher (2014–2015)
- Blaise Ingoglia (2015–2019)
- Joe Gruters (2019–2023)
- Christian Ziegler (2023–2024)
- Evan Power (2024–present)

== Electoral history ==
=== Gubernatorial ===
Florida Republican Party gubernatorial election results
Election	Gubernatorial candidate	Votes	Vote %	Result
1860	No candidate			
1865	No candidate			
1868	Harrison Reed	14,421	59.1%	Won ✓
1872	Ossian B. Hart	17,603	52.38%	Won ✓
1876	Marcellus Stearns	24,116	49.49%	Lost ✗
1880	Simon B. Conover	23,307	45.1%	Lost ✗
1884	Frank W. Pope	27,865	46.47%	Lost ✗
1888	V.J. Shipman	26,385	39.63%	Lost ✗
1892	No candidate			
1896	Edward R. Gunby	8,290	20.3%	Lost ✗
1900	Matthew B. MacFarlane	6,238	17.27%	Lost ✗
1904	Matthew B. MacFarlane	6,357	17.37%	Lost ✗
1908	John M. Cheney	6,453	15.4%	Lost ✗
1912	William R. O'Neal	2,646	5.46%	Lost ✗
1916	George W. Allen	10,333	12.47%	Lost ✗
1920	George E. Gay	23,788	17.93%	Lost ✗
1924	William R. O'Neal	17,499	17.21%	Lost ✗
1928	William J. Howey	95,018	39.03%	Lost ✗
1932	William J. Howey	93,323	33.38%	Lost ✗
1936	E.E. Callaway	59,832	19.09%	Lost ✗
1940	No candidate			
1944	Bert L. Acker	96,321	21.06%	Lost ✗
1948	Bert L. Acker	76,153	16.64%	Lost ✗
1952	Harry S. Swan	210,009	25.17%	Lost ✗
1954	J. Thomas Watson†	69,852	19.52%	Lost ✗
1956	William A. Washburne Jr.	266,980	26.31%	Lost ✗
1960	George C. Petersen	569,936	40.16%	Lost ✗
1964	Charles R. Holley	686,297	41.26%	Lost ✗
1966	Claude R. Kirk Jr.	821,190	55.13%	Won ✓
1970	Claude R. Kirk Jr.	746,243	43.12%	Lost ✗
1974	Jerry Thomas	709,438	38.8%	Lost ✗
1978	Jack Eckerd	1,123,888	44.41%	Lost ✗
1982	Skip Bafalis	949,013	35.3%	Lost ✗
1986	Bob Martinez	1,847,525	54.56%	Won ✓
1990	Bob Martinez	1,535,068	43.48%	Lost ✗
1994	Jeb Bush	2,071,068	49.23%	Lost ✗
1998	Jeb Bush	2,191,105	55.27%	Won ✓
2002	Jeb Bush	2,856,845	56.0%	Won ✓
2006	Charlie Crist	2,519,845	52.20%	Won ✓
2010	Rick Scott	2,619,335	48.87%	Won ✓
2014	Rick Scott	2,865,343	48.14%	Won ✓
2018	Ron DeSantis	4,076,186	49.59%	Won ✓
2022	Ron DeSantis	4,614,210	59.37%	Won ✓
2026	Byron Donalds	4,135,701	50.01%	Won ✓

== See also ==
- Florida Democratic Party
- Political party strength in the United States
- Political party strength in Florida

== Works cited ==
- Abbott, Richard (1986). The Republican Party and the South, 1855-1877: The First Southern Strategy. University of North Carolina Press. ISBN 0807816809.
- Steed, Robert; Moreland, Laurence; Baker, Tod, eds. (1980). Party Politics in the South. Praeger Publishers. ISBN 0030565863.
