= Jordan Varnadore =

American politician

Member of the Florida House of Representatives from the 71st district
- Incumbent
- Assumed office November 3, 2026
- Preceded by: Will Robinson

Personal details
- Party: Republican
- Website: Campaign website

Jordan Varnadore is an American politician. A member of the Republican Party, he has served in the Florida House of Representatives since 2026, representing the 71st district. He has a background in marketing.
