= Janet Cruz =

American politician

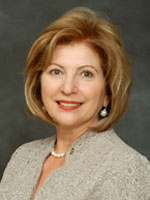

Member of the Florida Senate from the 18th district
- In office November 6, 2018 – November 8, 2022
- Preceded by: Dana Young
- Succeeded by: Jay Collins

Minority Leader of the Florida House of Representatives
- In office November 21, 2016 – November 19, 2018
- Preceded by: Mark Pafford
- Succeeded by: Kionne McGhee

Member of the Florida House of Representatives
- In office March 2, 2010 – November 6, 2018
- Preceded by: Michael Scionti
- Succeeded by: Susan Valdes
- Constituency: 58th district (2010-2012); 62nd district (2012–2018)

Personal details
- Born: July 7, 1956 (age 70) Tampa, Florida, U.S.
- Party: Democratic
- Spouse: Steve Rifkin
- Children: 4
- Education: Hillsborough College (AA)

Janet Cruz (born July 7, 1956) is an American politician who formerly served as a Democratic member of the Florida Senate, representing part of Hillsborough County and Tampa from 2018 until 2022 before losing re-election, as well as four terms in the Florida House of Representatives, representing a Tampa-based district from 2010 until her election to the Senate.

== History ==
Cruz was born in Tampa and attended Hillsborough Community College, where she graduated with an Associate degree in opticianry in 1977. She had her first child at the age of 16 and started a small business to support herself and her family. Cruz owns and operates several franchised Pearle Vision Center stores in the Tampa Bay region and worked as a Regional Director for Cigna Healthcare in Senior Group Sales.

== Florida House of Representatives ==
=== 2009 special election ===
On December 13, 2009, State Representative Michael Scionti resigned from the House to serve as the Deputy Assistant Secretary of Defense for Intergovernmental Affairs and Homeland Defense in the Obama administration, which prompted a special election in the 58th District. Cruz opted to run in the special election, despite the fact that she did not live in the district, and faced Pat Kemp, the Chairwoman of the Hillsborough County Democratic Party, and Gil Sanchez, an attorney, in the Democratic primary.

Cruz came under fire for not living in the district, and responded by emphasizing her west Tampa roots, noting, "I walk into the West Tampa Sandwich Shop and know every person at every table. West Tampa is not a physicality, it's a way of life. My heritage is there." The Tampa Tribune endorsed Cruz, noting that she "is well-connected to the Hispanic community but is concerned with the needs of all residents in the mostly working-class district," and suggesting that "Cruz would be more effective in the Republican-dominated legislature." In a low-turnout primary election, Cruz narrowly edged out Kemp by 53 votes with 47% of the vote to Kemp's 45% and Sanchez's 8%. In the general election, she faced Hunter Chamberlin, the Republican nominee, whom she easily defeated with 65% of the vote, and was sworn into her first term. Later that year, during regularly scheduled elections, she ran for re-election against independent candidate Joe Redner, whom she dispatched with 73% of the vote without much difficulty.

=== Reelection campaigns ===
In 2012, following the reconfiguration of House districts, Cruz was moved into the newly created 62nd District, which included most of the territory she had previously represented in the 58th District. She was unopposed in the Democratic primary, and encountered Wesley Warren, the Republican nominee, in the general election. Cruz was endorsed by both the Tampa Bay Times and the Tampa Tribune in her bid for re-election.

The Times observed that Cruz "has a good working relationship with lawmakers on both sides of the aisle and has strong ties in her native Tampa," while the Tribune praised her for doing "a good job serving her constituents and working successfully with the Republican-dominated House." Ultimately, Warren did not present much of a challenge for Cruz, and she easily defeated him with 70% of the vote.

In 2014, Cruz was re-elected to her third full term in the legislature without opposition. She was elected to the Florida State Senate in the 2018 election, holding on to her seat until losing to Republican Jay Collins in 2022.

=== Tenure ===
While serving in the legislature, Cruz joined with fellow State Representative Lori Berman to propose legislation that would ratify the Equal Rights Amendment in the state of Florida. Additionally, she strongly supported legislation that would "allow supervisors of elections to offer up to 14 days of early voting, and 12 hours of voting each day," in response to especially long lines at early voting locations during the 2012 elections.

March 2016 a bill passed that allows advanced registered nurse practitioners and physician assistants to prescribe controlled substances, a measure the group had put before the legislature for 22 years. The Senate passed the bill Friday with a unanimous vote. The chamber passed the bill 117-to-1, with Tampa Democratic Rep. Janet Cruz casting the lone vote against the bill. Cruz is married to a Tampa physician and this is thought to have impacted her decision to vote against the bill.

== Other work ==
Cruz currently serves on the Board of Advisors of Let America Vote, an organization founded by former Missouri Secretary of State Jason Kander that aims to end voter suppression in the United States.

Florida House of Representatives
Preceded by Mark Pafford	Minority Leader of the Florida House of Representatives; 2016–2018	Succeeded by Kionne McGhee
