= H. E. Boyd =

American politician

Member of the Florida House of Representatives from Manatee County
- In office 1941

Personal details
- Born: February 23, 1888 DeSoto County, U.S.
- Died: December 1952 (aged 64)
- Party: Democratic
- Children: 6; including Wilbur H. Boyd
- Relatives: Jim Boyd (grandson)

H. E. Boyd (February 23, 1888 – December 1952), also known as Hugh Boyd, was an American politician. He served as a Democratic member of the Florida House of Representatives.

== Life and career ==
Boyd was born in DeSoto County.

Boyd served in the Florida House of Representatives in 1941.

Boyd died in December 1952, at the age of 64.
