= Bryan Avila =

American politician (born 1984)

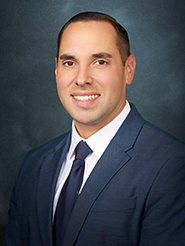
- Official portrait, 2022

Lieutenant Governor-elect of Florida
- Assuming office January 5, 2027
- Governor: Byron Donalds (elect)
- Succeeding: Jay Collins

Member of the Florida Senate from the 39th district
- In office November 8, 2022 – August 25, 2026
- Preceded by: Manny Díaz Jr. (redistricted)
- Succeeded by: Vacant

Speaker pro tempore of the Florida House of Representatives
- In office November 17, 2020 – November 8, 2022
- Preceded by: MaryLynn Magar
- Succeeded by: Chuck Clemons

Member of the Florida House of Representatives from the 111th district
- In office November 4, 2014 – November 8, 2022
- Preceded by: Eduardo González
- Succeeded by: David Borrero (redistricted)

Personal details
- Born: June 25, 1984 (age 42) Hialeah, Florida, U.S.
- Party: Republican
- Spouse: Cindy Gil
- Children: 2
- Education: Miami Dade College (AA); University of Miami (BA); Florida International University (MS, MPA)
- Website: Senate website Campaign website

Military service
- Allegiance: United States
- Branch/service: United States Army
- Years of service: 2016–present
- Rank: Captain
- Unit: Florida National Guard
- Awards: Army Commendation Medal; Humanitarian Service Medal; Military Outstanding Volunteer Service Medal

Bryan Avila (born June 25, 1984) is an American politician and Army National Guard officer who is the lieutenant governor-elect of Florida. Avila served in the Florida Senate, representing part of Miami-Dade County, from 2022 to 2026. A member of the Republican Party, he previously served in the Florida House of Representatives from 2014 to 2022.

Avila was the Republican nominee for lieutenant governor of Florida in the 2026 gubernatorial election, running alongside Byron Donalds.

== Early life and education ==
Avila was born in Hialeah, Florida to Cuban immigrant parents. He graduated from Miami Springs High School in 2002. He attended Miami-Dade College, receiving his associate's degree in 2004, and graduated from the University of Miami with a bachelor's degree in political science in 2006. Avila went on to attend Florida International University, where he graduated with a master's degree in criminal justice and Master of Public Administration degree in 2010.

== Early career ==
In 2011, Avila was appointed to serve on the Planning and Zoning Board for the City of Hialeah. The following year, he was appointed to the city's Scholarship Board. In 2013, Avila was elected as the vice-chairman of the Republican Party of Miami-Dade County and served until his election to the Florida House of Representatives.

Avila serves as a captain in the Florida Army National Guard and has been in the Guard since 2016.

== Florida House of Representatives ==
=== Elections ===
==== 2014 ====
In 2014, Avila ran to succeed incumbent State Representative Eduardo González, who was unable to seek re-election due to term limits. He faced Alexander Anthony, a former candidate for mayor of Miami Springs, in the Republican primary. Avila campaigned on improving the state's economy, cutting taxes, expanding educational opportunities, reducing the size of government, and eliminating corporate welfare. He earned the endorsement of the Miami Herald, which, though it recommended his candidacy, criticized his opposition to Medicaid expansion under the Affordable Care Act. Avila defeated Anthony by a wide margin. He won the Republican primary with 60% of the vote and advanced to the general election, where he faced Mariano Corcilli, the Democratic nominee. This time, he did not earn the endorsement of the Miami Herald, which supported his opponent over his opposition to Medicaid expansion. Ultimately, Avila defeated Corcilli in a landslide, winning 67% of the vote.

=== Tenure ===
During his first term in office, Avila authored pieces of legislation such as providing a property-tax exemption for low-income seniors, streamlining the tax appeals process, establishing in-state tuition for all active duty service members, reforming HIV testing, and implementing distance requirements for assisted living facilities. In 2016, Avila ran for re-election and defeated Sevi Miyar, the Democratic nominee and a high school teacher. Avila was recognized for his accomplishments during his first term in office and received an endorsement from the Miami Herald. He went on to win 59% of the vote and was sworn in for his second term on November 22, 2016.

Avila served as majority deputy whip from 2016 to 2018 and speaker pro tempore from 2020 to 2022. He chaired the Health Care Appropriations Subcommittee during the 2020–2022 term, which oversaw healthcare spending in the state budget. From 2016 to 2018, he was alternating chair of the Joint Committee on Public Counsel Oversight. He also held positions as vice chair of the Commerce Committee and served on committees including Appropriations, Redistricting, and Energy & Utilities.

== Florida Senate ==
=== Elections ===
==== 2022 ====
Term limited from his House seat in 2022, Avila announced his candidacy for the 6th district on the Miami-Dade County Commission. The incumbent, longtime Commissioner Rebecca Sosa, was term-limited, making the seat open for the first time since 2001. Avila's only other opponent in the race was diversity consultant Ibis Valdes. Avila suspended his bid for the county commission and instead ran for the Florida Senate, winning the 39th district seat without primary or general election opposition.

=== Tenure ===
Avila served in the Florida Senate from 2022 to 2026, representing the 39th district. His legislative work included efforts on tax reform, budget policy, education, and programs supporting veterans and seniors. He also sponsored legislation revising Florida’s homestead exemption formula for seniors, a measure intended to provide property tax relief. Avila served as chair of the Finance and Tax Committee, which oversees tax policy and fiscal legislation. He was vice chair of the Transportation Committee and a member of the Appropriations, Ethics and Elections, Health Policy, Environment and Natural Resources, Fiscal Policy, and Rules Committees. He also chaired the Governmental Oversight and Accountability Committee and the Collective Bargaining Committee, which oversee public administration and labor relations.

On August 25, 2026, Avila resigned from the Senate to run as the Republican nominee for lieutenant governor.

=== Legislation ===
During his tenure in the Florida Legislature, Avila sponsored or co-sponsored several bills on topics including education, taxation, and environmental protection.

- Standing Up Against Woke Indoctrination (HB 7, 2022): Sponsored the Individual Freedom Act, also known as the Stop WOKE Act, which restricts certain types of instruction in schools and workplace training programs related to race and sex discrimination.
- Additional Homestead Property Tax Exemption for Critical Public Service Workforce (HJR 1, 2022): Proposed an additional homestead property tax exemption for teachers, law enforcement officers, firefighters, child welfare professionals, and other frontline workers.
- Civic Education Curriculum (HB 5, 2021): Expanded requirements for civic education instruction in Florida schools.
- Everglades Protection Area (CS/HB 775, 2020): Sponsored legislation to strengthen protections against incompatible development in the Everglades Protection Area.
- Standing with the People of Venezuela (HM 205, 2019): Advanced a memorial urging the federal government to take stronger action in support of democracy and human rights in Venezuela.
- Discretionary Sales Surtax Transparency (CS/CS/HB 243, 2018): Required clearer ballot language and transparency for local discretionary sales surtax referendums.
- Tax Exemptions for First Responders and Surviving Spouses (HB 455, 2017): Created a full homestead property tax exemption for first responders permanently disabled in the line of duty and their surviving spouses.
- Property Tax Modernization (CS/CS/HB 289, 2017): Revised property assessment and tax procedures to promote consistency and transparency.
- Health Care Services (CS/CS/CS/HB 221, 2016): Strengthened consumer protections and oversight in the health care system.
- Homestead Tax Exemption for Long-Term, Low-Income Seniors (CS/HJR 275, 2016): Proposed expanding homestead exemptions for long-time, low-income senior residents.
- Gulf of America Labeling Update (SB 1058, 2025): Co-sponsored legislation that would direct state agencies and schools to use the term 'Gulf of America' in official materials purchased after July 1, 2025, instead of 'Gulf of Mexico'.
- Stolen Valor Act (SB 348, 2025): Co-sponsored legislation establishing penalties for individuals who fraudulently claim military honors for personal gain.
- Veterans’ Affairs Awareness Study (SB 116, 2025): Directed the Department of Veterans’ Affairs to conduct a statewide study of veterans’ healthcare, housing, and employment needs.
- Teaching the Truth About Communism (SB 1264, 2024): Required Florida schools to include instruction on the history of communism and related human rights abuses.
- Impeding, Threatening, or Harassing First Responders (SB 184, 2024): Made it a misdemeanor to impede or threaten first responders after being warned to maintain distance during emergencies.
- Protecting Service Members’ Jobs and Benefits (SB 818, 2024): Expanded employment protections and benefits for National Guard and Reserve members.
- Scrutinized Companies with Activities in Iran Terrorism Sectors List (SB 160, 2023): Sponsored legislation prohibiting state pension investments in companies with significant business activity in specified sectors of the Iranian economy. The bill also made such companies ineligible for state contracts valued at more than $1 million.
- Ending Communist Influence in Higher Education (SB 846, 2023): Prohibited state universities and colleges from accepting grants or forming partnerships with institutions linked to specified foreign countries of concern.
- Prescription Drug Transparency (SB 1550, 2023): Required manufacturers to disclose reportable prescription drug price increases and added consumer protections.
- Pathway for Military Combat Medics Act (SB 274, 2023): Directed Florida colleges and universities to award nursing credits for military medic experience.
- Fighting Back Against Communism Abroad (SM 160, 2023): Urged the U.S. Secretary of State to redesignate the Revolutionary Armed Forces of Colombia (FARC) as a Foreign Terrorist Organization.
- Education Choice Expansion (HB 1, 2023): Co-sponsored a K–12 education package expanding financial support and flexibility for families and school districts.
- Respecting Their Sacrifice Act (SB 1032, 2023): Increased state support for the funeral expenses of law enforcement officers killed in the line of duty and created bereavement leave for officers.

== Awards and honors ==
- Champion of Housing Award, Florida Home Builders Association (2017)
- Legislator of the Year, Building Owners and Managers Association (2019)
- Distinguished Advocate, Florida Chamber of Commerce (2019)
- Legislator of the Year, Florida Fraternal Order of Police (2023, 2024)
- Champion for Fiscal Responsibility, Americans for Prosperity (2024)
- Honor Roll, Florida Chamber of Commerce (2024)
- Hope Award, Florida Alliance to End Human Trafficking (2025)

== Personal life ==
Avila is married to his high school sweetheart, Cindy Gil-Avila who is from Bogotá, Colombia. In 2015, their daughter, Olivia, was born. Avila is Catholic.

Florida House of Representatives
| Preceded by MaryLynn Magar | Speaker pro tempore of the Florida House of Representatives; 2020–2022 | Succeeded by Chuck Clemons |
Party political offices
| Preceded by Jeanette Nuñez | Republican nominee for Lieutenant Governor of Florida; 2026 | Most recent |
Political offices
| Preceded by Jay Collins | Lieutenant Governor of Florida; Taking office 2027 | Elect |
