= Nick DiCeglie =

American politician from Florida

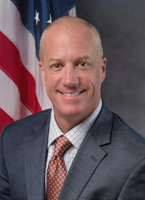

Member of the Florida Senate from the 18th district
- Incumbent
- Assumed office November 8, 2022
- Preceded by: Jeff Brandes

Member of the Florida House of Representatives from the 66th district
- In office November 6, 2018 – November 8, 2022
- Preceded by: Larry Ahern
- Succeeded by: Berny Jacques

Personal details
- Born: November 12, 1973 (age 52)
- Party: Republican
- Education: Lawrence High School (Cedarhurst, New York), Nassau Community College
- Occupation: Small business owner
- Website: nickdiceglie.com

Nick DiCeglie is a Republican member of the Florida Legislature representing the state's 18th Senate district, which includes part of Pinellas County, and formerly served in the House's 66th district which covered most of his current Florida Senate seat. He previously served in the Florida House of Representatives.

== History ==
DiCeglie grew up in North Woodmere, New York and moved to Florida in 1996. He moved to Florida and worked at his family's sanitation business.

== Florida House of Representatives ==
DiCeglie defeated Berny Jacques in the August 28, 2018 Republican primary for the 66th district House seat. DiCeglie went on to defeat Democrat Alex Heeren in the November 6, 2018 general election, winning 56.84% of the vote.
