= Baxter Troutman =

American politician

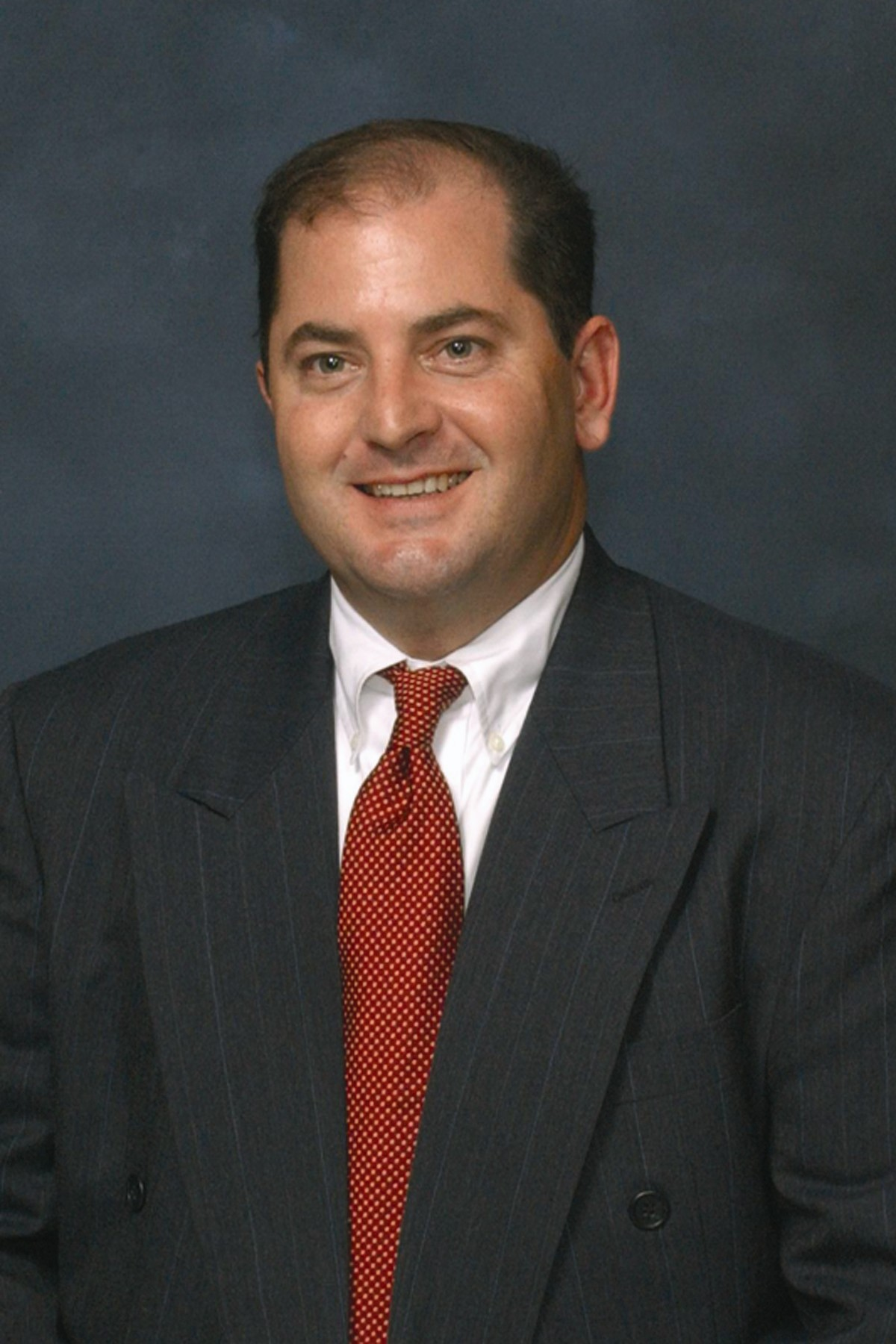

Member of the Florida House of Representatives from the 66th district
- In office November 5, 2002 – November 2, 2010
- Preceded by: J. D. Alexander
- Succeeded by: Ben Albritton

Personal details
- Born: November 25, 1966 (age 59) Lake Wales, Florida, U.S.
- Party: Republican
- Profession: Citrus grower, businessman

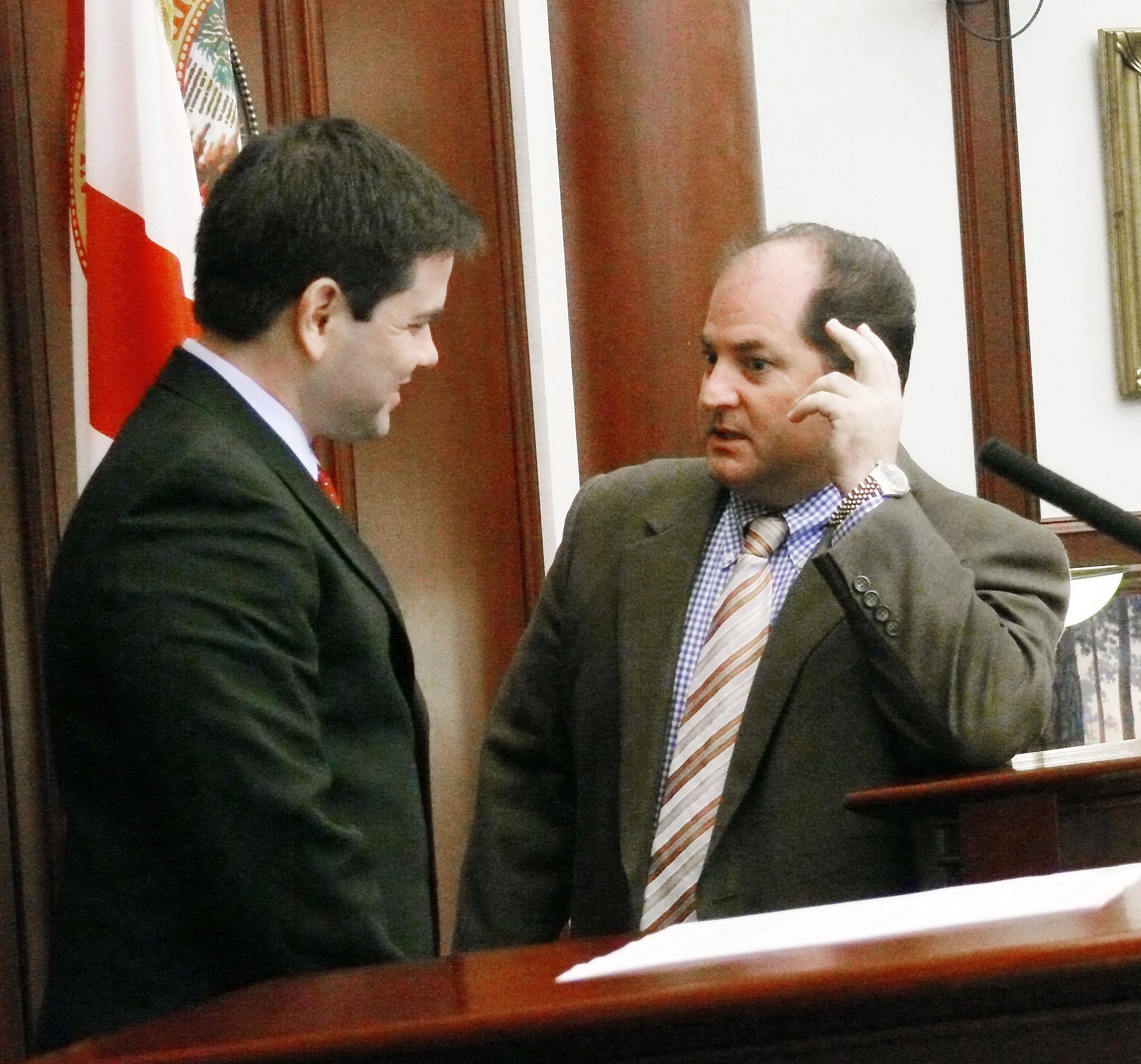
Troutman with Marco Rubio in 2008

Baxter Troutman is a Winter Haven, Florida citrus grower, businessman, and Republican politician who served as the representative for District 66 in the House of Representatives of the U.S. state of Florida. He was first elected to the Florida House in 2002, and was re-elected to three more successive terms. He served as vice chair of the Committee on Environmental Protection and the Environment & Natural Resources Council.

Representative Troutman was born in Lake Wales, Florida on November 25, 1966. He received an Associate of Arts degree from South Florida Community College in 1990 and a Bachelor of Science degree from Florida Southern College in 1994. He is the director of the Alico corporation, a Florida company dealing in farm goods. He was married to Rebecca Carney, to whom he proposed on the House floor in March 2008. He is the grandson of Florida citrus and cattle magnate Ben Hill Griffin, Jr., who at one time was one of the wealthiest people in the world. He is also the cousin of Florida State Senator J.D. Alexander, with whom he is often in disagreement.

In 2008 Troutman authored a bill intended to make it harder for copper thieves to sell to scrap dealers. The bill required scrap metal sellers to fill out an identification form and required scrap dealers to hold on to material for seven days before selling it. After a 2009 disagreement with Senate president Mike Haridopolos, the Senate Sergeant temporarily removed Troutman's "Senate floor privileges".

In 2017, Troutman filed to run for the open seat of Florida Commissioner of Agriculture for the 2018 election.

== Sources ==
- Florida House of Representatives Profile
- Project Vote Smart profile
