= Will Robinson (Florida politician) =

American politician from Florida

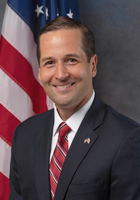

Member of the Florida House of Representatives from the 71st district
- Incumbent
- Assumed office November 6, 2018
- Preceded by: Jim Boyd

Personal details
- Born: William Cloud Robinson Jr. November 15, 1975 (age 50) Bradenton, Florida, U.S.
- Party: Republican
- Education: University of Notre Dame (BA); Stetson University (JD)
- Website: Campaign website

William Cloud "Will" Robinson Jr. (November 15, 1975) is a Republican member of the Florida Legislature representing the state's 71st House district, which includes parts of Manatee and Sarasota counties.

== Florida House of Representatives ==
Robinson defeated Democrat Tracy Pratt in the November 6, 2018 general election, winning 55.59% of the vote.
