= Florida's 39th Senate district =

American legislative district

Florida's 39th State Senate district
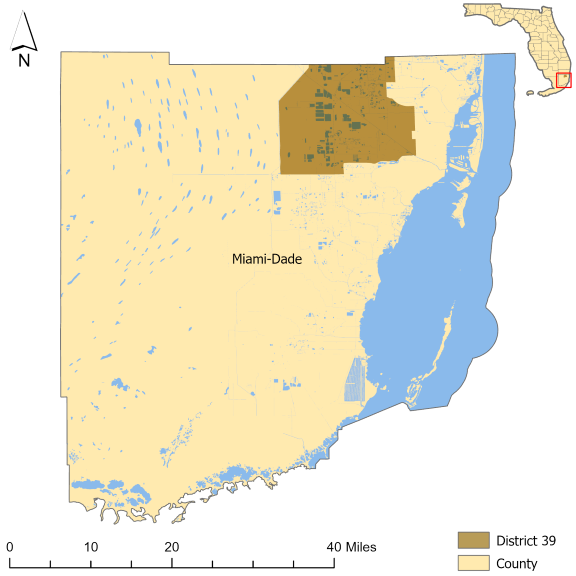
- Senator: Vacant
- Demographics: 5% White; 3% Black; 90% Hispanic; 1% Asian; 0% Other; 1% Multiracial
- Population (2023): 529,582

Florida's 39th Senate district elects one member of the Florida Senate. The district consists of part of Miami-Dade County, in the U.S. state of Florida. The seat is vacant after Republican Bryan Avila resigned to become Byron Donald's running mate in the 2026 gubernatorial election.

== List of senators ==
Full list of senators from the 39th district (1845–2006).

Portrait	Name	Party	Years of service	Home city/state	Notes
	Ferrin Campbell	Democratic	1962–1964	Crestview, Florida	Consisted of Okaloosa County
	Maurice McLaughlin	Democratic	1964–1966	Fort Walton Beach, Florida	Consisted of part of Okaloosa County
	Richard A. Pettigrew	Democratic	1972–1974	Charleston, West Virginia	
	Vernon Holloway	Democratic	1974–1980	Richmond, Virginia	
	Dick Renick	Republican	1980–1982	Yonkers, New York	Consisted of part of Miami-Dade County
	Lawrence Plummer	Democratic	1982–1992		
	Roberto Casas	Republican	1992–2000	Havana, Cuba	Consisted of part of Miami-Dade County
	Rudy García	Republican	2000–2002	Miami, Florida	Consisted of part of Miami-Dade County
	Larcenia Bullard	Democratic	2002–2012	Allendale, South Carolina	Consisted of parts of Hendry, Monroe, Miami-Dade, Collier, and Palm Beach counties
	Dwight Bullard	Democratic	2012–2016	Philadelphia, Pennsylvania	Redistricted; Consisted of all of Hendry and Monroe counties, as well part of Miami-Dade and Collier counties
	Anitere Flores	Republican	2016–2020	Miami, Florida	Redistricted from the 38th district; Consisted of all of Monroe County and most of Miami-Dade County
	Ana María Rodríguez	Republican	2020–2022	Miami, Florida	Consisted of all of Monroe County and most of Miami-Dade County
	Bryan Avila	Republican	2022-2026	Hialeah, Florida	Redistricted from the 36th district; Consists of part of Miami-Dade County

== Elections ==
=== 2018 ===
2018 Florida's 39th senate district election
Party	Candidate	Votes	%
Republican	Ana María Rodríguez	123,556	55.6%
Democratic	Javier E. Fernandez	95,135	42.8%
Independent	Celso D. Alfonso	3,639	1.6%
Total votes		222,330	100%
Republican hold			

=== 2022 ===
2022 Florida's 39th senate district election
Party	Candidate	Votes	%
Republican	Bryan Avila	Unopposed	
Total votes		—	—
Republican hold			

=== 2026 ===
Incumbent senator Bryan Avila is eligible to run for re-election in 2026
