= Brad Yeager =

American politician

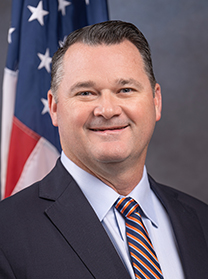

Member of the Florida House of Representatives from the 56th district
- Incumbent
- Assumed office November 8, 2022
- Preceded by: Amber Mariano

Personal details
- Party: Republican
- Spouse: Lisa Yeager
- Occupation: Small Business Owner

Bradford Troy "Brad" Yeager is an American politician. He serves as a Republican member for the 56th district of the Florida House of Representatives. He represents Port Richey and New Port Richey in the Florida House and was re-elected in 2026.

== Life and career ==
Yeager attended Charlotte High School.

In August 2022, Yeager defeated Scott Moore and Jayden Cocuzza in the Republican primary election for the 56th district of the Florida House of Representatives. No candidate was nominated to challenge him in the general election. He assumed office in November 2022.
