= Jim Boyd (politician) =

American politician

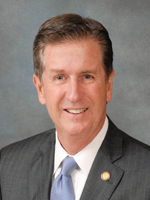

Majority Leader of the Florida Senate
- In office November 19, 2024 – November 17, 2026
- Preceded by: Ben Albritton
- Succeeded by: Ana Maria Rodriguez

Member of the Florida Senate
- Incumbent
- Assumed office November 3, 2020
- Preceded by: Bill Galvano
- Constituency: 21st district (2020–2022); 20th district (2022–present)

Member of the Florida House of Representatives
- In office November 2, 2010 – November 6, 2018
- Preceded by: Bill Galvano
- Succeeded by: Will Robinson
- Constituency: 68th district (2010–2012); 71st district (2012–2018)

Personal details
- Born: October 22, 1956 (age 70) Bradenton, Florida, U.S.
- Party: Republican
- Spouse: Sandy Boyd
- Children: 2
- Education: Manatee Community College (AA); Florida State University (BS)

Jim Boyd (born October 22, 1956) is a Republican politician and a current member of the Florida Senate, representing the 20th District, which includes northern Manatee County and southern Hillsborough County. Boyd previously represented the 68th District from 2010 to 2012 and the 71st District from 2012 to 2018.

== History ==
Boyd was born in Bradenton, into a political family that included his grandfather, Hugh Boyd, a former State Representative, and his uncle, Wilbur H. Boyd, a former State Representative and State Senator. In 1974, Boyd received his high school diploma from Palmetto High School. He attended Manatee Community College, where he graduated in 1976 with an Associate's degree in 1976, and then Florida State University, where he graduated with a Bachelor's degree in 1978. He served on the Palmetto City Council from 1988 to 1993, during which time he also served as Vice-Mayor and Mayor. After retiring from local politics, he worked as an insurance agent and realtor.

== Political career ==
In 2010, incumbent Republican State Representative Bill Galvano could not seek another term due to term limits, and Boyd ran to succeed him in the 68th District, which included parts of Manatee County. He won the nomination of the Republican Party uncontested, and in the general election, faced independent candidate Dave Miner. Boyd was able to defeat Miner without much difficulty, receiving 62% of the vote.

When Florida House districts were reconfigured in 2012, Boyd opted to run in the newly created 71st District, which included most of the territory that he had previously represented in the 68th District. He won the nomination of his party uncontested, and faced Democratic nominee Adam Tebrugge in the general election. Boyd and Tebrugge held sharp disagreements on many issues, with Boyd advocating for Governor Rick Scott's plan to phase out Florida's corporate income tax, while Tebrugge strongly opposed such efforts. Additionally, Boyd advocated for expanding school choice to include charter and religious schools, noting, "nobody cares more [about schools] than parents," while Tebrugge supported strengthening public schools. Ultimately, Boyd was able to defeat Tebrugge by a comfortable margin, winning 56% of the vote. In 2014, Boyd was re-elected to his third term in the legislature without opposition.

In 2020, Boyd joined the Florida Senate. That same year, he sponsored legislation to overturn the results of a Key West ballot initiative to restrict the size of ships and the number of passengers who can visit the city daily. He voted yea for the controversial Senate Bill 86 in 2021. He ran for reelection during the 2022 election cycle. Due to redistricting, if elected for a four-year term in the 2022 election, he became eligible for another four-year term (Article VI, Section 4, Florida Constitution).

Florida Senate
Preceded by Ben Albritton	Majority Leader of the Florida Senate; 2024–present	Incumbent
