= Florida Senate Majority Office =

- 2024-2026 Florida Legislature
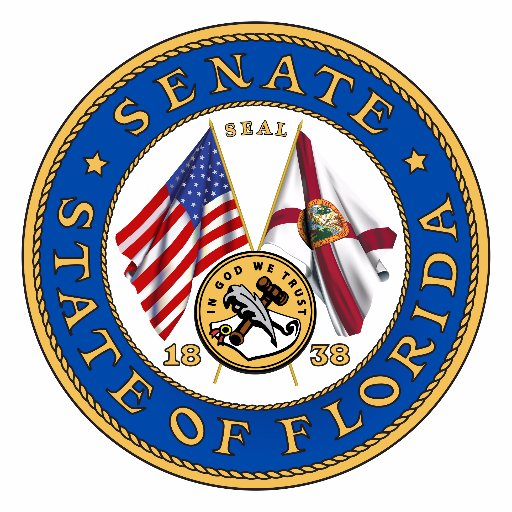

Leadership
- President: Ben Albritton (R) since November 19, 2024
- President Pro Tempore: Jason Brodeur (R) since November 19, 2024
- Majority Leader: Jim Boyd (R) since November 19, 2024

Structure
- Length of term: 4 years

Motto
- In God We Trust

Meeting place
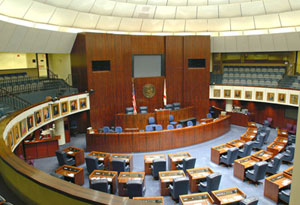
- Senate Chamber; Florida Capitol; Tallahassee, Florida

Website
- Florida Senate Majority Office

The Florida Senate Majority Office is the political extension of the Florida Senate president. The Senate Majority Office consists of the majority leader, a deputy majority leader, majority whips, and staff. The Florida Senate majority leader is elected by Florida State senators in the political party holding the largest number of seats in the Senate. Since 1996, Republicans have held the majority in the Florida Senate.

== See also ==
- Florida Democratic Party
- Florida Legislature
- Florida Senate
- Florida State Capitol
- Government of Florida
- Republican Party of Florida
