= Ben Albritton =

American politician

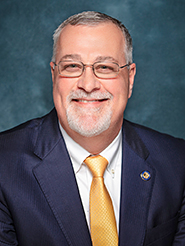

President of the Florida Senate
- In office November 19, 2024 – November 17, 2026
- Preceded by: Kathleen Passidomo
- Succeeded by: Jim Boyd

Majority Leader of the Florida Senate
- In office November 14, 2022 – November 19, 2024
- Preceded by: Debbie Mayfield
- Succeeded by: Jim Boyd

Member of the Florida Senate
- Incumbent
- Assumed office November 6, 2018
- Preceded by: Denise Grimsley
- Constituency: 26th district (2018–2022); 27th district (2022–present)

Member of the Florida House of Representatives
- In office November 2, 2010 – November 6, 2018
- Preceded by: Baxter Troutman
- Succeeded by: Melony Bell
- Constituency: 66th district (2010–2012); 56th district (2012–2018)

Personal details
- Born: August 17, 1968 (age 58) Lakeland, Florida, U.S.
- Party: Republican
- Spouse: Missy Schrader
- Children: 3
- Education: Florida Southern College (BS)

Ben Albritton (born August 17, 1968) is a Republican politician, current member of the Florida Senate and a former member of the Florida House of Representatives, representing the 56th District, which includes DeSoto County, Hardee County, and southwestern Polk County, from 2012 to 2018. Albritton previously represented the 66th District from 2010 to 2012.

== History ==
Albritton was born in Lakeland and attended Florida Southern College, where he received a degree in citrus in 1990. Following graduation, he joined his family's citrus grove company, working with his brother and his uncle. Albritton served on the Peace River Valley Citrus Growers Association Board from 2002 to 2007, and in 2005, he was appointed to the Florida Citrus Commission by Governor Jeb Bush, where he served until 2010 following reappointment by Governor Charlie Crist, including a tenure as chairman from 2007 to 2010. Additionally, Albritton served on the East Charlotte County Drainage District as a board member.

== Florida House of Representatives ==
When incumbent State Representative Baxter Troutman was unable to seek re-election in 2010 due to term limits, Albritton ran to succeed him in the 66th District, which included Hardee County, southern Polk County, and northwestern Highlands County. He faced Chevon Baccus in the Republican primary, whom he significantly outraised, eventually defeating her with 79% of the vote. In the general election, he faced only a write-in opponent, whom he defeated with 99% of the vote. Following his election, Albritton indicated that he intended to run to be Speaker of the Florida House of Representatives for the 2016-2018 session, but he lost out to Richard Corcoran.

In 2012, when the state legislative districts were reconfigured, Albritton was moved to the 56th District, which included most of the territory that he represented in the 66th District. He faced no opposition in the primary or general elections and won his second term entirely uncontested. Albritton was re-elected to his third term in the legislature without opposition in 2014.

== Florida Senate ==
Albritton was elected to the Florida Senate in 2018.

In 2022 Albritton sponsored Senate Bill 2508, a controversial measure which drew the ire of fishing guides and conservationists. Critics called it a last second "sneak attack" that sought to prioritize the supply of water from Lake Okeechobee for industrial sugarcane farmers over the health of the Everglades ecosystem. The measure, filed as a "budget conforming bill," was subject to only one public hearing; though it was approved by the Florida Legislature, it was vetoed by Gov. Ron DeSantis.

Albritton is Senate President for the 2024-26 term.

Florida House of Representatives
| Preceded by Baxter Troutman | Member of the Florida House of Representatives from the 66th district 2010–2012 | Succeeded by Larry Ahern |
| Preceded by Rachel Burgin | Member of the Florida House of Representatives from the 56th district 2012–2018 | Succeeded by Melony Bell |
Florida Senate
| Preceded by Denise Grimsley | Member of the Florida Senate from the 26th district 2018–2022 | Succeeded by Lori Berman |
| Preceded by Ray Rodrigues | Member of the Florida Senate from the 27th district 2022–present | Incumbent |
| Preceded by Debbie Mayfield | Majority Leader of the Florida Senate; 2022–2024 | Succeeded by Jim Boyd |
Political offices
| Preceded by Kathleen Passidomo | President of the Florida Senate; 2024–present | Incumbent |
