= Berny Jacques =

American politician

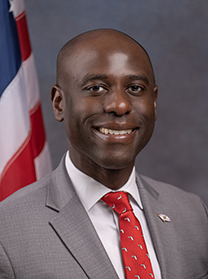

Member of the Florida House of Representatives from the 59th district
- Incumbent
- Assumed office November 8, 2022
- Preceded by: Nick DiCeglie (redistricting)

Personal details
- Born: April 24, 1987 (age 39) Port-au-Prince, Haiti
- Party: Republican
- Education: Washington Adventist University (BA); Stetson University (JD)
- Website: https://bernyforflorida.com/

Berny Jacques (born April 24, 1987) is an American attorney and politician serving as a member of the Florida House of Representatives for the 59th district. He assumed office on November 8, 2022. He is a Republican.

== Early life and education ==
Jacques was born in Port-au-Prince, Haiti and left the country amid political unrest with his family, settling in Florida in 1994. He earned a Bachelor of Arts degree in political science and history from Washington Adventist University and a Juris Doctor from the Stetson University College of Law.

== Career ==
In 2008, Jacques was a legislative intern for Congressman Mario Díaz-Balart. From 2012 to 2016, he served as an assistant state attorney in the Office of the Sixth Judicial Circuit State Attorney. In 2016 and 2017, he was an associate at Berkowitz & Myer. Since 2017, Jacques has worked as the senior director of partnerships at Big Brothers Big Sisters of Tampa Bay. He was a political analyst for Bay News 9.
