= Florida Legislature =

Legislative branch of the state government of Florida

- 2026–2028 session

Type
- Type: Bicameral
- Chambers: Senate; House of Representatives

History
- Founded: May 26, 1845
- Preceded by: Legislative Council of the Territory of Florida
- New session started: November 19, 2024; 23 months ago

Leadership
- Senate President: Ben Albritton (R) since November 19, 2024
- House Speaker (acting): Wyman Duggan (R) since August 21, 2026

Structure
- Seats: 160 voting members: 40 senators; 120 representatives
- State Senate political groups: Majority: Republican (26); Minority: Democratic (12); Independent (1); Vacant (1)
- House of Representatives political groups: Majority: Republican (82); Minority: Democratic (34); Vacant (4)
- Salary: President of the Senate and Speaker of the House of Representatives = $25,000/year + per diem; All other members = $18,000/year + per diem; Per diem = subsistence and travel

Elections
- Last State Senate election: November 5, 2024
- Last House of Representatives election: November 5, 2024
- Next State Senate election: November 3, 2026
- Next House of Representatives election: November 3, 2026
- Redistricting: Legislative control

Motto
- In God We Trust

Meeting place
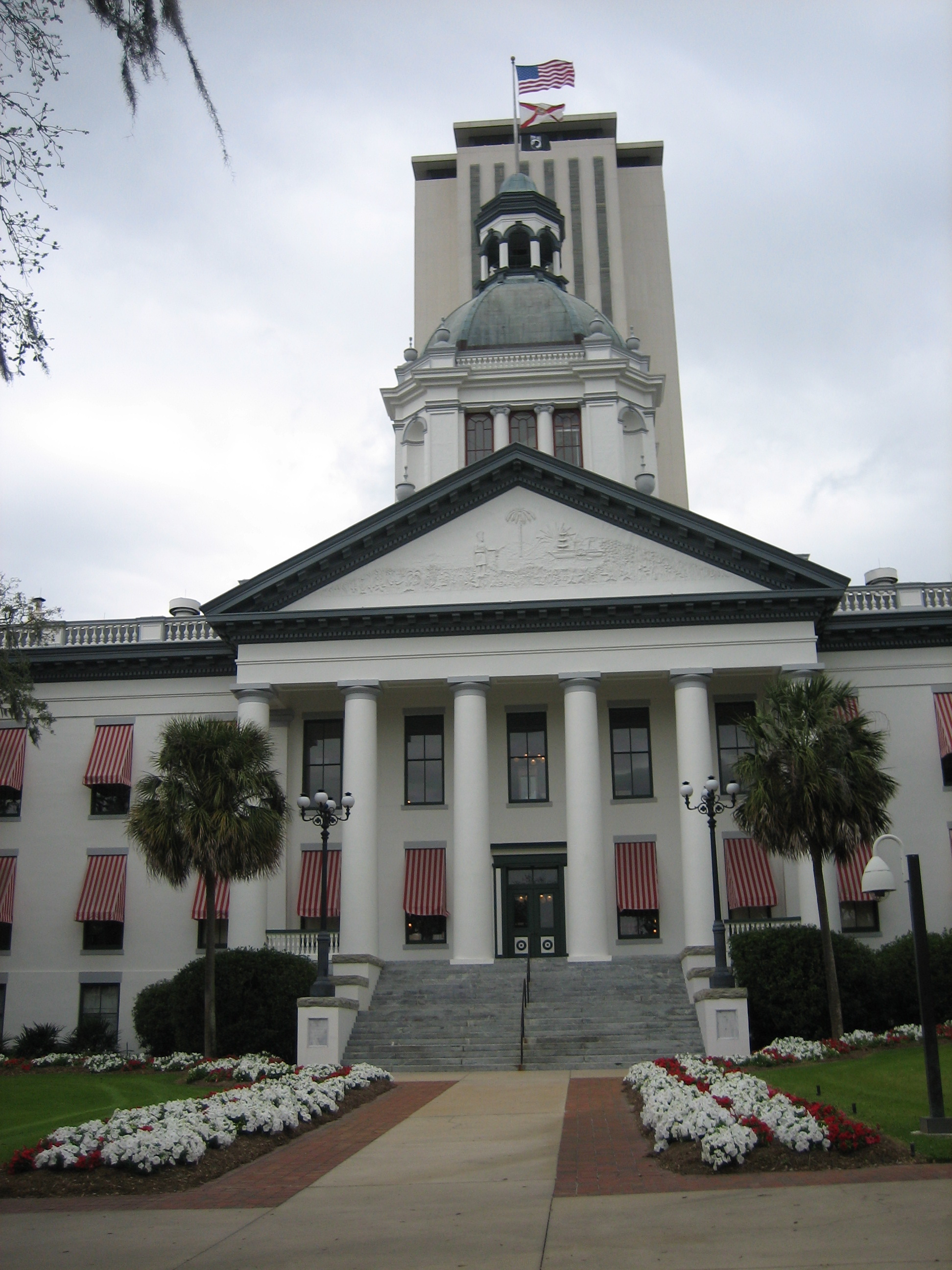
- Florida Capitol (Old Capitol in foreground) Tallahassee

Website
- Official Website

Constitution
- Constitution of Florida

The Florida Legislature is the legislature of the U.S. state of Florida. It is organized as a bicameral body composed of an upper chamber, the Florida Senate, and a lower chamber, the Florida House of Representatives. The legislature is composed of 160 state legislators, with 40 in the Senate and 120 in the House.

Article III, Section 1 of the Florida Constitution, adopted in 1968, defines the role of the legislature and how it is to be constituted. The primary purpose of the legislature is to enact new laws and amend or repeal existing laws. The legislature meets in the Florida State Capitol building in Tallahassee, Florida.

== History ==
For much of its history, Florida's legislature was limited to men and blacks were excluded. During the Reconstruction era after the American Civil War, Republicans held power in the state and nationally. The enfranchised African Americans who voted and helped elect officeholders at the local, state, and federal levels. After Reconstruction ended Democrats regained power, disenfranchised blacks, and excluded them from local and state offices until the civil rights era of the 1960s. Florida's 19th century state officeholders are noted at African American officeholders from the end of the Civil War until before 1900.

The 19th Amendment to the U.S. Constitution became law on August 26th, 1920 and enfranchised women voters even though Florida did not ratify the federal law for decades. Florida ratified the amendment in 1969. Edna Giles Fuller began serving in the Florida House in 1929. Beth Johnson began serving in the Florida Senate in 1963.

== Florida Senate ==
The Senate is the upper house of the state legislature. As of August 2026, Republicans hold a two-thirds supermajority in the Senate with 26 seats; Democrats are in the minority with 12 seats. There is one independent, and one vacancy.

== Florida House of Representatives ==
The House of Representatives is the lower house of the state legislature. As of August 2026, Republicans hold a two-thirds supermajority in the House of Representatives with 82 seats, and Democrats hold 34 seats. Four seats are vacant.

== Terms ==
=== Senate ===
Senators are elected for a term of four years. The terms are staggered so half of the body is up for election every two. Senators representing odd-numbered districts are elected in years which are multiples of four and those from even-numbered districts in years which are not multiples of four. An exception to this occurs after legislative reapportionment in which all senators go up for election and half of the body serves only a two year term to maintain the staggered pattern. Reapportionment usually occurs in the first session after the decennial census, but court-ordered redistricting can also trigger all senators going up for election, like what occurred in 2016.

=== House of Representatives ===
Members of the House of Representatives are elected for terms of two years in each even-numbered year.

=== Term limits ===
In 1992, voters passed Amendment 9 to amend the State Constitution to limit federal and state officials to eight-year terms. In 1995, the U.S. Supreme Court ruled that states could not enact congressional term limits.

== Qualifications ==
Florida legislators must be at least twenty-one years old, an elector and resident of their district, and must have resided in Florida for at least two years before an election.

== Legislative session ==
=== Regular legislative sessions ===
The Florida Legislature meets in a 60-day regular legislative session each year. Regular legislative sessions in odd-numbered years must begin on the first Tuesday after the first Monday in March and on the second Tuesday after the first Monday in January of each even-numbered year.

Before 1991, the regular legislative session began in April. Senate Joint Resolution 380 (1989) proposed to the voters a constitutional amendment (approved November 1990) that shifted the starting date of regular legislative session from April to February. Subsequently, Senate Joint Resolution 2606 (1994) proposed to the voters a constitutional amendment (approved November 1994) shifting the start date to March, where it remains. In recent years, the legislature has opted to start in January to allow lawmakers to be home with their families during school spring breaks, and to give more time ahead of the legislative elections in the Fall.

=== Special legislative sessions ===
Special legislative sessions may be called by the governor, by a joint proclamation of the Senate president and House speaker, or by a three-fifths vote of all legislators. These sessions can last up to 20 days during which the legislature may only address legislative business that is within the purview of the purpose or purposes stated in the special session proclamation.

== Powers and process ==
The Florida Legislature is authorized by the Florida Constitution to create and amend the laws of the state of Florida, subject to the governor's power to veto legislation. To do so, legislators propose legislation in the forms of bills drafted by a nonpartisan, professional staff. Successful legislation must undergo committee review, three readings on the floor of each house, with appropriate voting majorities, as required, and either be signed into law by the governor or enacted through a veto override approved by two-thirds of the membership of each legislative house.

Its statutes, called "chapter laws" or generically as "slip laws" when printed separately, are compiled into the Laws of Florida and are called "session laws". The Florida Statutes are the codified statutory laws of the state.

In 2009, legislators filed 2,138 bills for consideration. On average, the legislature has passed about 300 bills into law annually.

In 2013, the legislature filed about 2,000 bills. About 1,000 of these were "member bills." The remainder are bills by committees responsible for certain functions, such as the budget. In 2016, about 15% of the bills were passed. In 2017, 1,885 lobbyists registered to represent 3,724 entities.

The legislature also has the power to propose amendments to the Florida Constitution.

== Leadership ==
The House of Representatives is headed by the speaker of the House, while the Senate is headed by the Senate president. The House speaker and Senate president control the assignment of committees and leadership positions, along with control of the agenda in their chambers. The two leaders, along with the governor of Florida, control most of the agenda of state business in Florida.

- President of the Senate: Ben Albritton (R)
- President Pro Tempore of the Florida Senate: Jason Brouder (R)
- Majority Leader of the Florida Senate: Ben Albritton (R)
- Minority Leader of the Florida Senate: Lori Berman (D)
- Speaker of the Florida House: Daniel Perez (R)
- Speaker Pro Tempore of the Florida House: Wyman Duggan (R)
- Majority Leader of the Florida House: Tyler I. Sirois (R)
- Minority Leader of the Florida House: Fentrice Driskell (D)

== See also ==
- Florida House of Representatives
- Florida Senate
- Florida Senate Majority Office
- Florida State Capitol
- Government of Florida
- List of presidents of the Florida Senate
- List of speakers of the Florida House of Representatives
- List of Florida state legislatures
- The Florida Channel
