= Lori Berman =

Florida State Representative

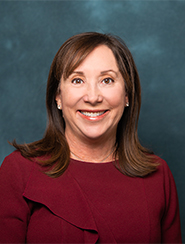

Minority Leader of the Florida Senate
- Incumbent
- Assumed office April 24, 2025
- Preceded by: Jason Pizzo

Member of the Florida Senate
- Incumbent
- Assumed office April 10, 2018
- Preceded by: Jeff Clemens
- Constituency: 31st district (2018–2022); 26th district (2022–present)

Member of the Florida House of Representatives
- In office November 2, 2010 – April 9, 2018
- Preceded by: Maria Sachs
- Succeeded by: Joseph Casello
- Constituency: 86th district (2010–2012); 90th district (2012–2018)

Personal details
- Born: June 27, 1958 (age 68) New York City, New York, U.S.
- Party: Democratic
- Education: Tufts University (BA); George Washington University (JD); University of Miami (LLM)

Lori Berman (born June 27, 1958) is a Democratic member of the Florida Senate, representing parts of central Palm Beach County since being elected in an April 2018 special election. She previously served four terms in the Florida House of Representatives from 2010 until her election to the Senate.

== History ==
Berman was born to a Jewish family in New York City, New York, moved to the state of Florida in 1958, and later attended Tufts University, where she graduated with a Bachelor's degree in 1980. Afterwards, she attended the George Washington University Law School, graduating in 1983. She returned to Florida, and, years later, attended the University of Miami School of Law, where she received a Master of Laws with a specialty in estate planning in 2002. While working as an attorney in South Florida, Berman became active in politics, working for the congressional campaigns of former Congressman Robert Wexler and in his congressional office.

== Florida House of Representatives ==
When incumbent State Representative Maria Sachs opted to run for the Florida Senate rather than seek re-election, Berman ran to succeed her in the Democratic primary in the 86th District, which stretched from Hypoluxo to Boca Raton in eastern Palm Beach County. She defeated her only opponent, Carole Penny Kaye, in a landslide, receiving 79% of the vote. In the general election, Berman was unopposed and won her first term uncontested.

In 2012, when the Florida House districts were reconfigured, Berman was redistricted into the 90th District, which included most of the territory that she had previously represented. She won the nomination of her party unopposed, and in the general election, faced Republican nominee Sean Michael Kasper. The Palm Beach Post endorsed Berman for re-election, praising her for having "an impact in a GOP-dominated legislature," despite adhering "too much to liberal party doctrine." The South Florida Sun-Sentinel concurred, criticizing Kasper for "his lack of understanding...the issues facing lawmakers and the basics of...the legislative process," but endorsing Berman for her "decent record of representing county residents in Tallahassee." She ended up defeating Kasper in a landslide, receiving 68% of the vote to his 32%.

While serving in the legislature, Berman joined with fellow State Representative Janet Cruz to propose legislation that would ratify the Equal Rights Amendment in the state of Florida. Berman also sponsored legislation that would "impose background checks on all gun purchasers," but it did not pass in the 2013 legislative session.

In 2014, Berman was re-elected to her third term in the legislature without opposition. She was re-elected to a fourth term in 2016, defeating a Libertarian Party candidate 79.5 to 20.5%.

== Florida Senate ==
In 2017, State Senator Jeff Clemens resigned after admitting to an extramarital affair with a lobbyist, creating a vacancy in his central Palm Beach County district. Berman ran in the special election to fill the seat, resigning her House seat the day before the general election to do so. She defeated Tami Donnally, the vice chair of the Palm Beach County Republican Party, 75 to 25%.

Berman was unanimously elected minority leader by her Florida Senate Democratic colleagues on April 24, 2025, after preceding leader Jason Pizzo left the Democratic Party. Berman co-lead the delegation of American lawmakers to the 50 States One Israel conference held in Israel in September 2025.

Florida Senate
Preceded by Jason Pizzo	Minority Leader of the Florida Senate; 2025–present	Incumbent
