= Florida's 26th Senate district =

Florida's 26th State Senate district
Senator
Lori Berman; D–Lantana

Florida's 26th Senate district elects one member to the Florida Senate. It contains parts of Palm Beach County. It previously contained DeSoto, Glades, Hardee, Highlands, Okeechobee, and parts of Charlotte, Lee, and Polk counties.

== Members ==
- Lawton Chiles (1966–1967)
- Denise Grimsley (2016–2018)
- Ben Albritton (2018–2022)
- Lori Berman (since 2022)
