= Florida's 18th Senate district =

American legislative district in Florida

Florida's 18th State Senate district
Senator
Nick DiCeglie; R–Indian Rocks Beach

Florida's 18th Senate district elects one member to the Florida State Senate. It contains parts of Pinellas County.

Until 2022, the district was based in Hillsborough County.

== Members ==
Portrait	Name	Party	Years of service	Home city	Notes
	Wilton Simpson	Republican	2012–2016		
	Dana Young	Republican	2016–2018		
	Janet Cruz	Democratic	2018–2022		
	Nick DiCeglie	Republican	2022–present	Indian Rocks Beach	
