= Florida's 59th House of Representatives district =

Florida district

Florida's 59th State House of Representatives district
Representative
Berny Jacques; R–Seminole

Florida's 59th House of Representatives district elects one member of the Florida House of Representatives. It covers parts of Pinellas County.

== Members ==
- Les Miller (1992–2000)
- Arthenia Joyner (2000–2006)
- Betty Reed (2006–2012)
- Ross Spano (2012–2018)
- Adam Hattersley (2018–2020)
- Andrew Learned (2020–2022)
- Berny Jacques (since 2022)
