= Florida's 20th Senate district =

Florida's 20th State Senate district
Senator
Jim Boyd; R–Bradenton

Florida's 20th Senate district elects one member to the Florida State Senate.

== Geography ==
Year	Location	Map
2016	Hillsborough County, Pasco County and Polk County	
2024	Parts of Hillsborough County and Manatee County	

== Members ==
- Tom Lee (2016–2020)
- Jim Boyd (since 2020)
