= Jason Pizzo =

American attorney and politician

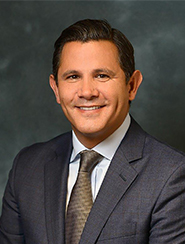

Minority Leader of the Florida Senate
- In office November 19, 2024 – April 24, 2025
- Preceded by: Lauren Book
- Succeeded by: Lori Berman

Member of the Florida Senate
- Incumbent
- Assumed office November 6, 2018
- Preceded by: Daphne Campbell
- Constituency: 38th district (2018–2022); 37th district (2022–present)

Personal details
- Born: Jason William Barnet Pizzo; May 20, 1976 (age 50) Somerville, New Jersey, U.S.
- Party: Democratic (before 2025); Independent (2025–present)
- Spouse: April Pizzo
- Children: 2
- Education: New York University (BA); Columbia University (MS); University of Miami (JD)

Jason William Barnet Pizzo (born May 20, 1976) is an American attorney and politician who has served as a member of the Florida Senate since 2018, representing parts of coastal Broward and Miami-Dade Counties. An elected Democrat for most of his career, Pizzo became an independent in 2025.

Born in New Jersey, Pizzo received his Juris Doctor at the University of Miami. While attending law school, he served as an assistant state attorney for the Miami-Dade State Attorney’s Office.

== Career ==
Pizzo first ran for the State Senate against Daphne Campbell in the 2016 Democratic Party primary where he earned 24% of the vote, losing to Campbell's 31%. In 2018, Pizzo ran again and received 54% to Campbell's 46% in the primary. Pizzo was elected to the Florida legislature on November 6, 2018 without opposition. In 2022, Pizzo was re-elected to the Florida Senate without opposition.

On February 10, 2023, the Florida Senate Democratic Party caucus unanimously elected Pizzo to succeed Lauren Book as Senate Democratic leader during the 2024–2026 term.

On April 24, 2025, Pizzo announced that he had left the Democratic Party and registered as an independent. He had considered a run for governor of Florida in 2026 as an independent.

== Elections ==
2018 Florida's 38th Senate district Primary Election
| Party | Candidate | Votes | % |
|---|---|---|---|
| Democratic | Jason Pizzo | 26,907 | 54.09% |
| Democratic | Daphne Campbell | 22,837 | 45.91% |
| Total votes | | 49,744 | 100.00% |

2016 Florida's 38th Senate district Primary Election
| Party | Candidate | Votes | % |
|---|---|---|---|
| Democratic | Daphne Campbell | 9,017 | 31.01% |
| Democratic | Jason Pizzo | 6,888 | 23.69% |
| Democratic | Michael Gongora | 6,243 | 21.47% |
| Democratic | Kevin A. Burns | 4,437 | 15.26% |
| Democratic | Anis Blemur | 1,529 | 5.26% |
| Democratic | Don Festge | 964 | 3.32% |
| Total votes | | 29,078 | 100.00% |

Florida Senate
| Preceded by Lauren Book | Minority Leader of the Florida Senate; 2024–2025 | Succeeded by Lori Berman |
