= Florida Senate =

Upper house of the Florida Legislature

- 2026–2028 session
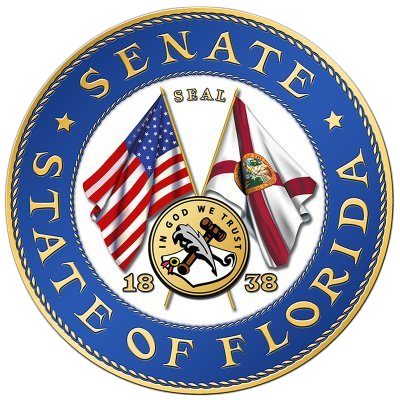

Type
- Type: Upper house
- Term limits: 2 terms (8 years) (Note: Every 10 years after redistricting, 20 senators are elected to 2 year terms.)

History
- Founded: May 26, 1845; 181 years ago
- Preceded by: Legislative Council of the Territory of Florida
- New session started: November 19, 2024; 23 months ago

Leadership
- President: Ben Albritton (R) since November 19, 2024
- President pro tempore: Jason Brodeur (R) since November 19, 2024
- Majority Leader: Jim Boyd (R) since November 19, 2024
- Minority Leader: Lori Berman (D) since April 24, 2025

Structure
- Seats: 40
- Political groups: Majority: Republican (25); Minority: Democratic (13); Independent (1); Vacancies: Vacant (1)
- Length of term: 4 years
- Authority: Article III, Constitution of Florida
- Salary: $29,697.00/year + per diem (Subsistence & Travel)

Elections
- Last election: November 5, 2024 (20 seats)
- Next election: November 3, 2026 (21 seats)
- Redistricting: Legislative control

Motto
- In God We Trust

Meeting place
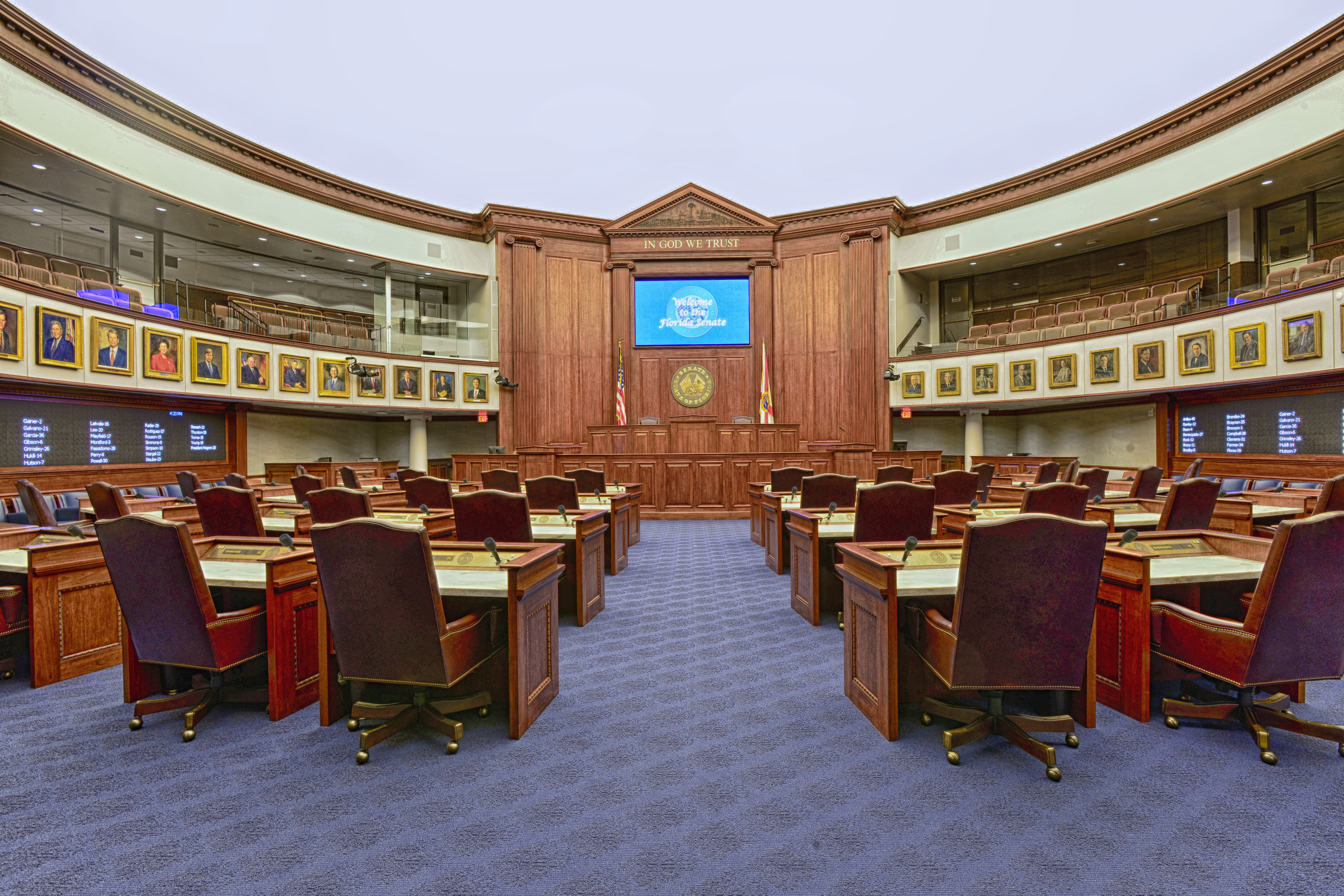
- Senate Chamber; Florida Capitol; Tallahassee, Florida

Website
- flsenate.gov

Constitution
- Constitution of Florida

Rules
- The Florida Senate Rules

The Florida Senate is the upper house of the Florida Legislature, the state legislature of the U.S. state of Florida, the Florida House of Representatives being the lower house. Article III, Section 1 of the Constitution of Florida, adopted in 1968, defines the role of the Legislature and how it is to be constituted. The Senate is composed of 40 members, each elected from a single-member district with a population of approximately 540,000 residents. The Senate Chamber is located in the State Capitol building.

The Republicans hold a supermajority in the chamber with 26 seats; Democrats are in the minority with 12 seats. One seat is held by an independent, and one seat is vacant.

== Terms ==
Article III of the Florida Constitution defines the terms for state legislators. The Constitution requires state senators from odd-numbered districts to be elected in the years that end in numbers that are multiples of four. Senators from even-numbered districts must be elected in even-numbered years, the numbers of which are not multiples of four.

To reflect the results of the U.S. census and the redrawing of district boundaries, all seats are up for election in redistricting years, with some terms truncated as a result. Thus, senators in odd-numbered districts were elected to two-year terms in 2022 (following the 2020 census), and senators in even-numbered districts will be elected to two-year terms in 2032 (following the 2030 census).

=== Term limits ===
Candidates for re-election to the Florida Senate cannot appear on the ballot after serving for eight consecutive years. This was established by Amendment No. 9 (1992) affecting Article 6, Section 4 of the state Constitution.

== Qualifications ==
Florida legislators must be at least twenty-one years old, an elector and resident of their district, and must have resided in Florida for at least two years prior to election.

== Legislative session ==
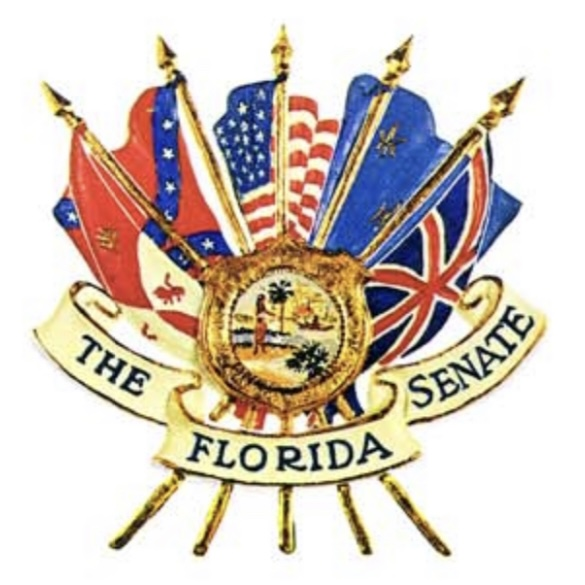
Coat of arms of the Florida Senate, adopted by the Florida Senate in 1972

Each year during which the Legislature meets constitutes a new legislative session.

=== Regular legislative session ===
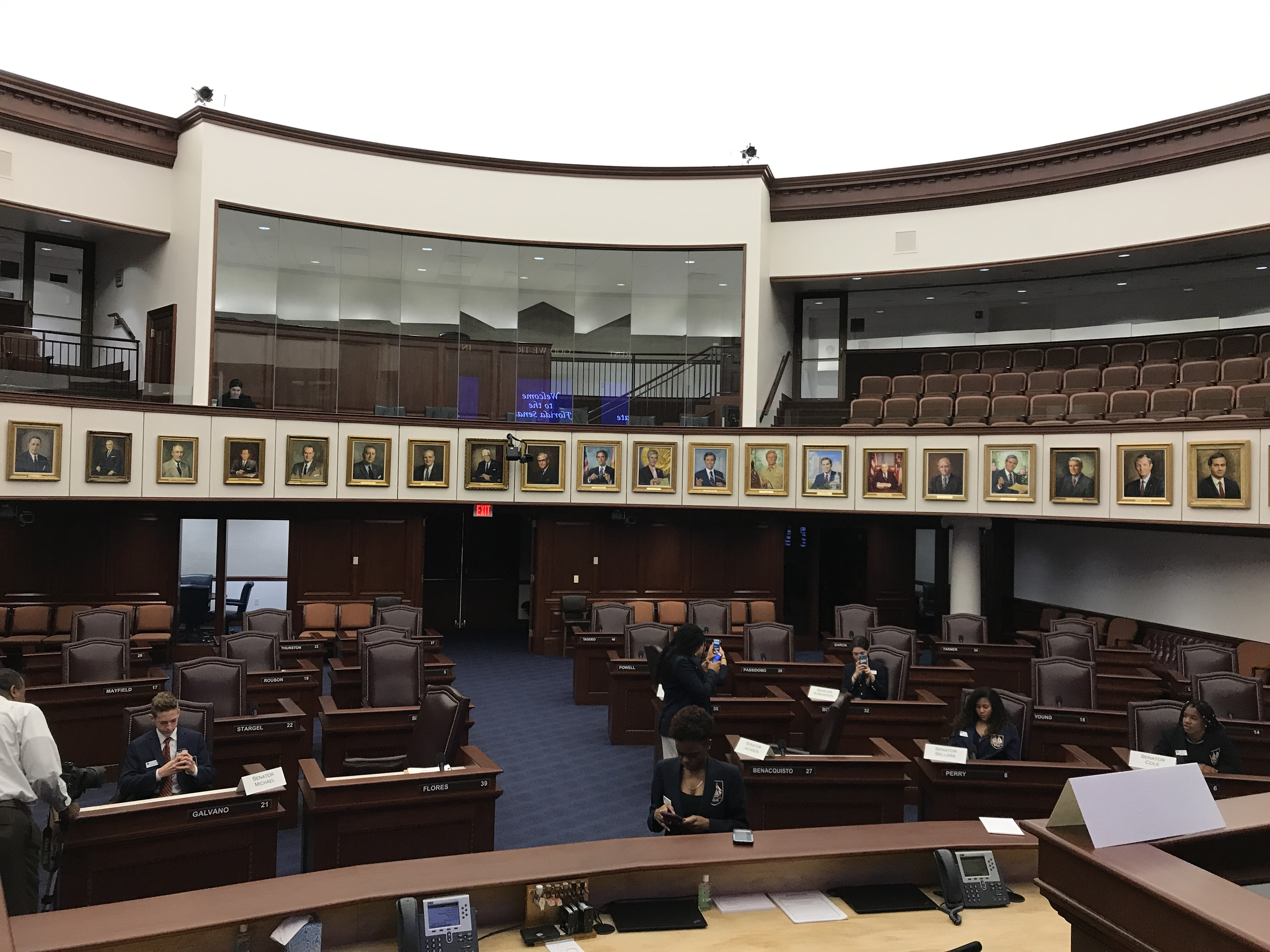
Senate chamber in 2018

The Florida Legislature meets in a 60-day regular legislative session each year. Regular sessions in odd-numbered years must begin on the first Tuesday after the first Monday in March. Under the State Constitution, the Legislature can begin even-numbered year regular sessions at a time of its choosing.

=== Special session ===
Special legislative sessions may be called by the governor, by a joint proclamation of the Senate president and House speaker, or by a three-fifths vote of all legislators. During a special session, the Legislature may only address legislative business that is within the purpose or purposes stated in the proclamation calling the session.

== Powers and process ==
The Florida Statutes are the codified statutory laws of the state.

=== Leadership ===
The Senate is headed by the Senate President, who controls the agenda along with the Speaker of the House and Governor.

- President: Ben Albritton (R)
- President Pro Tempore: Jason Brodeur (R)
- Majority Leader: Jim Boyd (R)
- Minority Leader: Lori Berman (D)

== Composition ==
Affiliation	Party (Shading indicates majority caucus)			Total	Vacant
Affiliation	Republican	Democratic	Independent	Total	Vacant
End of 2020–22 legislature	23	16	0	39	1
Start of previous (2022–24) legislature	28	12	0	40	0
End of previous legislature	28	12	0	40	0
Start of current (2024–26) legislature	28	12	0	40	0
February 13, 2025 (Note: Democrat Geraldine Thompson (District 15) died.)	28	11	0	39	1
March 31, 2025 (Note: Republican Randy Fine (District 19) resigned effective this date to run for Congress.)	27	11	0	38	2
April 24, 2025 (Note: Jason Pizzo (District 37) changed party affiliation from Democrat to no party affiliation.)	27	10	1	38	2
June 10, 2025 (Note: Republican Debbie Mayfield elected to replace Randy Fine (District 19).)	28	10	1	39	1
July 21, 2025 (Note: Republican Blaise Ingoglia (District 11) resigned after being appointed state Chief Financial Officer.)	27	10	1	38	2
August 12, 2025 (Note: Republican Jay Collins (District 14) resigned after being appointed Lieutenant Governor.)	26	10	1	37	3
September 2, 2025 (Note: Democrat LaVon Bracy Davis elected to replace Geraldine Thompson (District 15).)	26	11	1	38	2
December 9, 2025 (Note: Republican Ralph Massullo elected to replace Blaise Ingoglia (District 11).)	27	11	1	39	1
March 24, 2026 (Note: Democrat Brian Nathan elected to replace Jay Collins (District 14).)	27	12	1	40	0
August 25, 2026 (Note: Republican Bryan Avila (District 39) resigned to run for Lieutenant Governor.)	26	12	1	39	1
Latest voting share	66.7%	30.8%	2.6%		

== Members, 2024–2026 ==
District	Name	Party	Residence	Counties	Start	Next election
1	Don Gaetz	Rep	Crestview	Escambia, Santa Rosa, part of Okaloosa	2024	2028
2	Jay Trumbull	Rep	Panama City	Bay, Calhoun, Holmes, Jackson, Walton, Washington, part of Okaloosa	2022	2026
3	Corey Simon	Rep	Tallahassee	Dixie, Franklin, Gadsden, Gulf, Hamilton, Jefferson, Lafayette, Leon, Liberty, Madison, Suwannee, Taylor, Wakulla	2022	2028
4	Clay Yarborough	Rep	Jacksonville	Nassau, part of Duval	2022	2026
5	Tracie Davis	Dem	Jacksonville	Part of Duval	2022	2028
6	Jennifer Bradley	Rep	Fleming Island	Baker, Bradford, Clay, Columbia, Gilchrist, Union, part of Alachua	2020	2026
7	Tom Leek	Rep	Ormond Beach	Flagler, Putnam, St. Johns, part of Volusia	2024	2028
8	Tom Wright	Rep	New Smyrna Beach	Parts of Brevard and Volusia	2018	2026 (Note: Term limited.)
9	Stan McClain	Rep	Summerfield	Marion, parts of Alachua and Levy	2024	2028
10	Jason Brodeur	Rep	Sanford	Seminole, part of Orange	2020	2026
11	Ralph Massullo	Rep	Lecanto	Citrus, Hernando, Sumter, part of Pasco	2025 (Note: First elected in a special election.)	2028
12	Colleen Burton	Rep	Lakeland	Part of Polk	2022	2026
13	Keith Truenow	Rep	Tavares	Lake, part of Orange	2024	2028
14	Brian Nathan	Dem	Tampa	Part of Hillsborough	2026	2026
15	LaVon Bracy Davis	Dem	Ocoee	Part of Orange	2025	2028
16	Darryl Rouson	Dem	St. Petersburg	Parts of Hillsborough and Pinellas	2016	2026
17	Carlos Smith	Dem	Orlando	Part of Orange	2024	2028
18	Nick DiCeglie	Rep	Indian Rocks Beach	Part of Pinellas	2022	2026
19	Debbie Mayfield	Rep	Indialantic	Part of Brevard	2025	2028
20	Jim Boyd	Rep	Bradenton	Parts of Hillsborough and Manatee	2020	2026
21	Chris Nocco	Rep	New Port Richey	Parts of Pasco and Pinellas	2026	2028
22	Joe Gruters	Rep	Sarasota	Sarasota, part of Manatee	2018	2026
23	Danny Burgess	Rep	Zephyrhills	Parts of Hillsborough and Pasco	2020	2028
24	Mack Bernard	Dem	West Palm Beach	Part of Palm Beach	2024	2026
25	Kristen Arrington	Dem	Orlando	Osceola, part of Orange	2024	2028
26	Lori Berman	Dem	Lantana	Part of Palm Beach	2018	2026
27	Ben Albritton	Rep	Wauchula	Charlotte, DeSoto, Hardee, parts of Lee and Polk	2018	2028
28	Kathleen Passidomo	Rep	Naples	Collier, Hendry, part of Lee	2016	2026
29	Erin Grall	Rep	Vero Beach	Glades, Highlands, Indian River, Okeechobee, part of St. Lucie	2022	2028
30	Tina Polsky	Dem	Boca Raton	Parts of Broward and Palm Beach	2020	2026
31	Gayle Harrell	Rep	Stuart	Martin, parts of Palm Beach and St. Lucie	2018	2028
32	Rosalind Osgood	Dem	Fort Lauderdale	Part of Broward	2022	2026
33	Jonathan Martin	Rep	Fort Myers	Part of Lee	2022	2028
34	Shevrin Jones	Dem	West Park	Part of Miami-Dade	2020	2026
35	Barbara Sharief	Dem	Plantation	Part of Broward	2024	2028
36	Ileana Garcia	Rep	Miami	Part of Miami-Dade	2020	2026
37	Jason Pizzo	Ind (Note: Pizzo served as a Democrat from 2018–2025 before switching to Independent.)	North Miami Beach	Parts of Broward and Miami-Dade	2018	2028
38	Alexis Calatayud	Rep	Miami	Part of Miami-Dade	2022	2026
39	Vacant			Part of Miami-Dade		
40	Ana Maria Rodriguez	Rep	Doral	Monroe, part of Miami-Dade	2020	2026

== District map ==
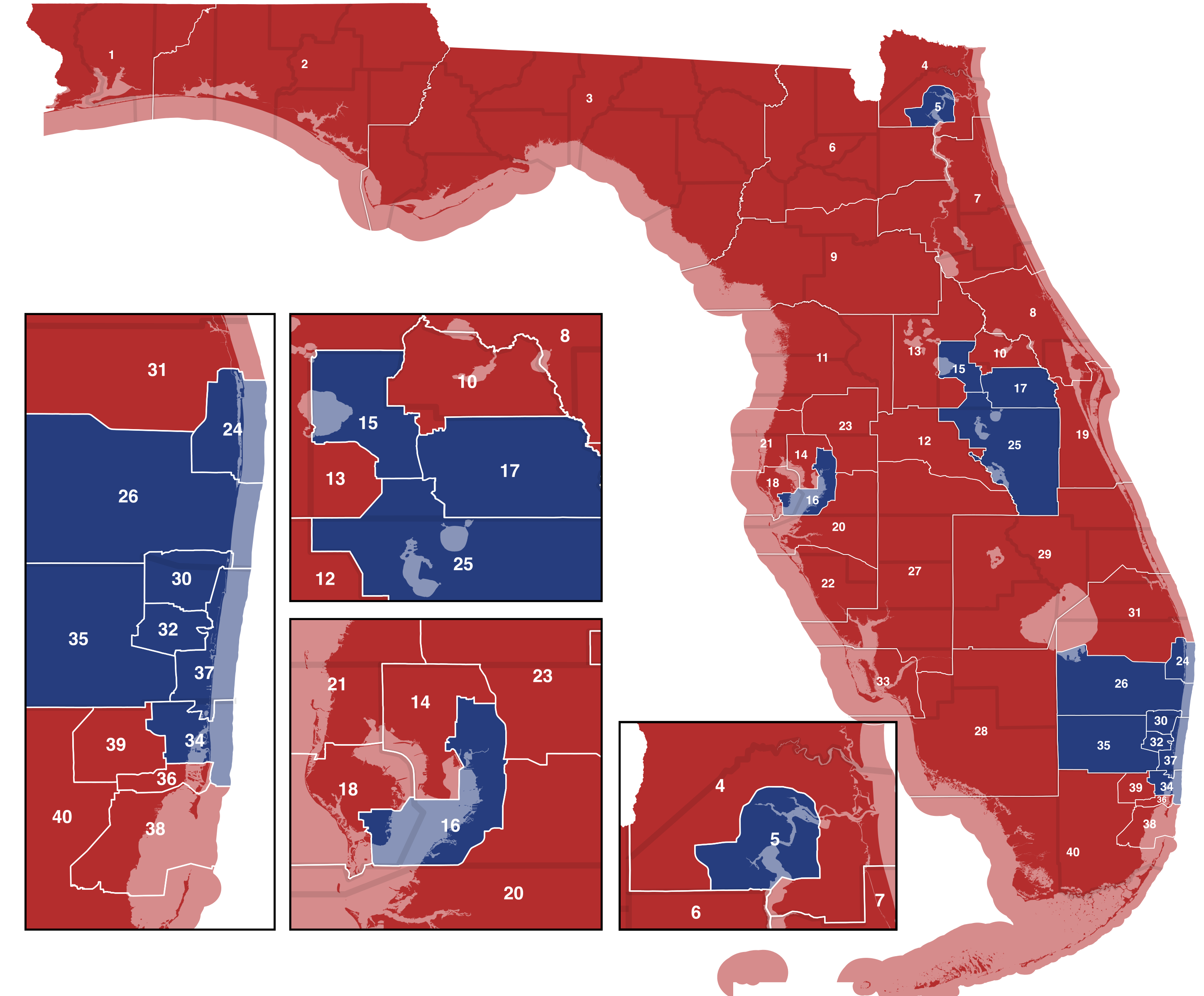
Districts and party composition of the Florida Senate after the 2026 elections Democratic Party Republican Party Independent

== See also ==
- Florida State Capitol
- Florida Senate Majority Office
- Government of Florida
- List of presidents of the Florida Senate
- List of Florida state legislatures
