= Florida's 56th House of Representatives district =

Florida district

Florida's 56th State House of Representatives district
Representative
Brad Yeager; R–New Port Richey

Florida's 56th House of Representatives district elects one member of the Florida House of Representatives. It covers parts of Pasco County.

== Members ==
- Brad Yeager (since 2022)
