= Florida's 71st House of Representatives district =

Florida district

Florida's 71st State House of Representatives district
Representative
Will Robinson; R–Bradenton

Florida's 71st House of Representatives district elects one member of the Florida House of Representatives. It contains parts of Manatee County.

== Members ==
- Will Robinson (2018-2026)
- Jordan Varnadore (since 2026)
