= Ana Maria Rodriguez (politician) =

American politician from Florida

Ana María Rodríguez
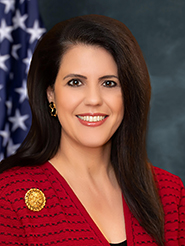
- Official portrait, 2023

Member of the Florida Senate
- Incumbent
- Assumed office November 3, 2020
- Preceded by: Anitere Flores
- Constituency: 39th district (2020–2022); 40th district (2022–present)

Member of the Florida House of Representatives from the 105th district
- In office November 6, 2018 – November 3, 2020
- Preceded by: Carlos Trujillo
- Succeeded by: David Borrero

Personal details
- Born: May 23, 1977 (age 49) Miami, Florida, U.S.
- Party: Republican
- Education: Florida International University (BS); Nova Southeastern University (MS)
- Website: Campaign website

Ana María Rodríguez is an American politician serving in the Florida Senate—representing the 40th district encompassing Monroe and parts of Miami-Dade Counties—since 2020. A Republican, she served one term in the Florida House of Representatives, representing parts of Broward, Collier, and Miami-Dade counties from 2018 until her election to the Senate.

== Biography ==
The daughter of Cuban immigrants, Rodríguez has lived her entire life in South Florida. Prior to entering politics, Rodríguez was a lobbyist for Baptist Health South Florida and the Miami Association of Realtors. Before her election to the Florida House of Representatives, Rodriguez served on the Doral City Council.

== Legislative career ==
Rodríguez was elected to the Florida House of Representatives in the November 6, 2018 general election, narrowly defeating Democrat Javier Estévez with 50.44% of the vote.

In 2020, Rodríguez ran for the Florida Senate seat vacated by Anitere Flores, who was term-limited. She was unopposed in the Republican primary and defeated Democratic State Representative Javier Fernández in the general election, 55.6 to 42.8%.
