= Florida's 31st Senate district =

American legislative district

Florida's 31st State Senate district
Senator
Gayle Harrell; R–Stuart

Florida's 31st Senate district elects one member to the Florida State Senate. It contains Martin County and parts of Palm Beach County and St. Lucie County.

== Members ==
- Gayle Harrell (since 2022)
