= Florida's 66th House of Representatives district =

Florida district

Florida's 66th State House of Representatives district
Representative
Traci Koster; R–Tampa

Florida's 66th House of Representatives district elects one member of the Florida House of Representatives. It covers parts of Hillsborough County.

== Members ==
- Traci Koster (since 2022)
