= 2010 Florida Senate election =

- November 2, 2010

23 out of 40 seats in the Florida Senate 21 seats needed for a majority
- Turnout: 48.7%
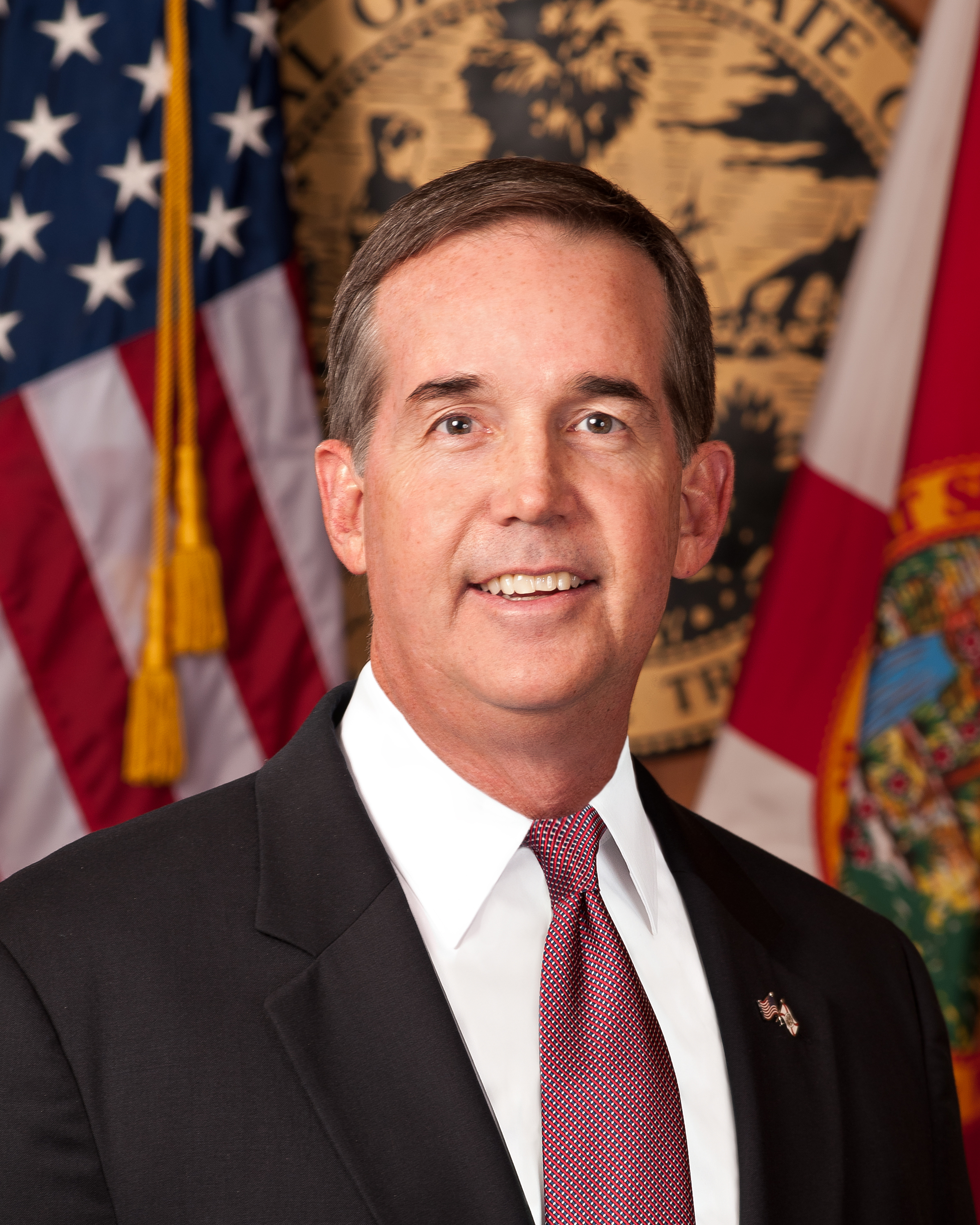

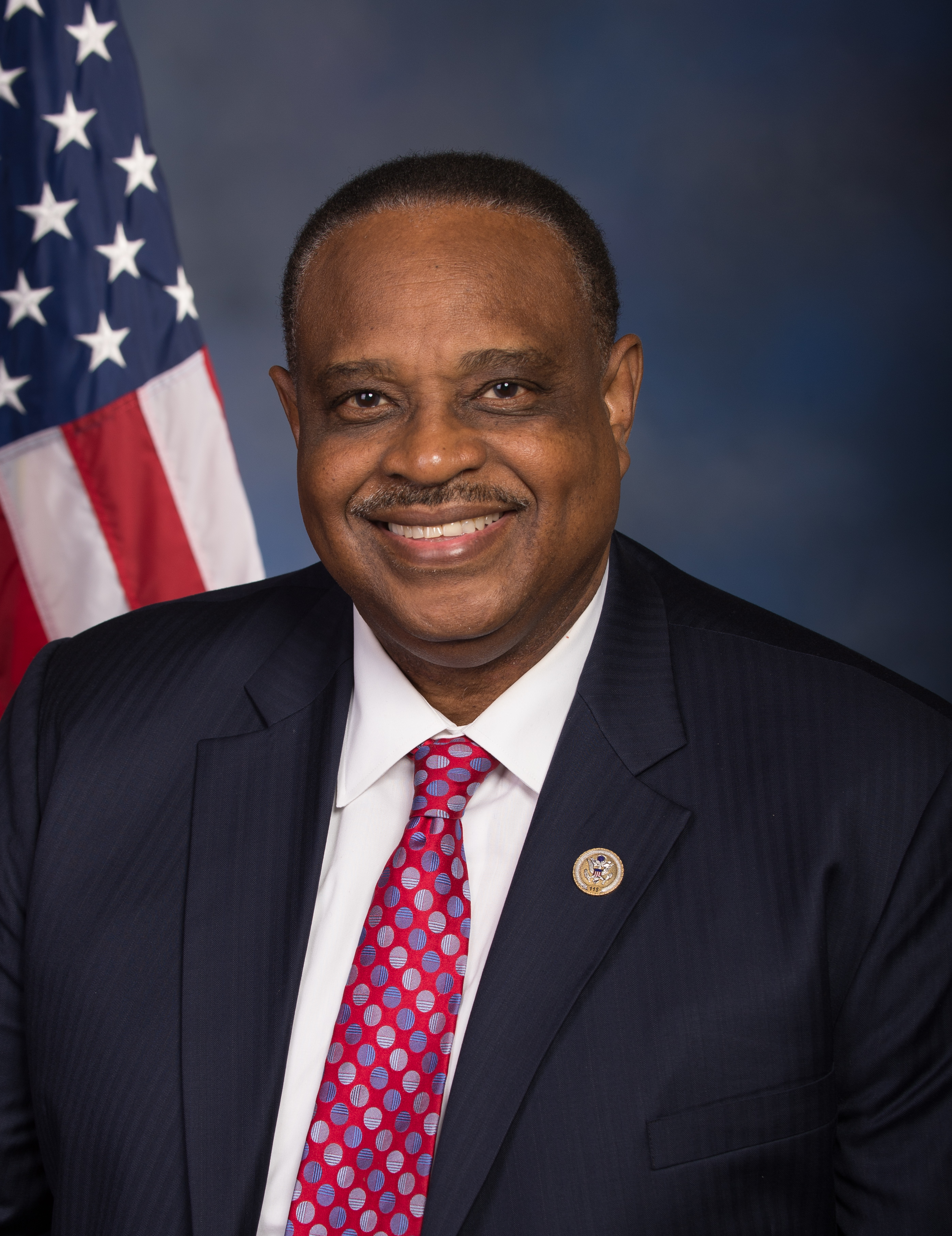
| | Majority party | Minority party |
|---|---|---|
| Leader | Jeff Atwater (term-limited) | Al Lawson (term-limited) |
| Party | Republican | Democratic |
| Leader since | November 18, 2008 | November 2008 |
| Leader's seat | District 25 | District 6 |
| Last election | 26 | 14 |
| Seats after | 28 | 12 |
| Seat change | ▲2 | ▼2 |
President before election
Jeff Atwater
Republican
Elected President
Mike Haridopolos
Republican

The 2010 Florida Senate election was held on November 2, 2010, to determine which party would control the Florida Senate for the following two years in the 2011-2012 Florida Legislature. A total of 23 out of the 40 seats in the Florida Senate were up for election and the primary occurred on August 24, 2010. Prior to the election, 26 seats were held by Republicans and 14 seats were held by Democrats. The general election saw the Republican Party expand their majority by 2 seats, meaning that they gained a supermajority in the State Senate.

== Predictions ==
| Source | Ranking | As of |
|---|---|---|
| Governing | Safe R | November 1, 2010 |

== Term-limited incumbents ==
=== Democrats ===
1. District 6: Al Lawson
2. District 27: Dave Aronberg

=== Republicans ===
1. District 2: Durell Peaden
2. District 12: Victor Crist
3. District 20: Carey Baker
4. District 22: Lee Constantine
5. District 25: Jeffrey Atwater
6. District 36: Alex Díaz de la Portilla
7. District 38: J. Alex Villalobos
8. District 40: Rudy Garcia

== Retirements ==
=== Democrats ===
1. District 16: Charlie Justice retired to run unsuccessfully for United States House of Representatives in Florida's 10th congressional district.
2. District 35: Dan Gelber retired to run unsuccessfully for Florida Attorney General.

== Closest races ==
Seats where the margin of victory was under 10%:

1. District 14, 7.60%
2. District 27, 8.20% (gain)

== Results ==
=== District 2 ===
District 2 election, 2010
| Party | Candidate | Votes | % |
|---|---|---|---|
| Republican | Greg Evers | 100,073 | 79.10% |
| Tea Party | Christopher S. Crawford | 26,148 | 20.70% |
| Write-in | Margaret Smith | 310 | 0.20% |
| Total votes | | 126,531 | 100.0% |
| Republican hold | | | |

=== District 4 ===
District 4 election, 2010
| Party | Candidate | Votes | % |
|---|---|---|---|
| Republican | Don Gaetz (incumbent) | | 100.0% |
| Total votes | | | 100.0% |
| Republican hold | | | |

=== District 6 ===
District 6 election, 2010
| Party | Candidate | Votes | % |
|---|---|---|---|
| Democratic | Bill Montford | 99,825 | 67.00% |
| Republican | John Shaw | 44,510 | 29.90% |
| Independent | David H. Abrams | 4,686 | 3.10% |
| Write-in | Harrison Arencibian | 10 | 0.00% |
| Total votes | | 149,031 | 100.0% |
| Democratic hold | | | |

=== District 8 ===
District 8 election, 2010
| Party | Candidate | Votes | % |
|---|---|---|---|
| Republican | John Thrasher (incumbent) | 110,176 | 60.00% |
| Democratic | Deborah Gianoulis | 73,314 | 39.90% |
| Write-in | Rebecca Ann Holcomb | 110 | 0.10% |
| Total votes | | 183,600 | 100.0% |
| Republican hold | | | |

=== District 10 ===
District 10 election, 2010
| Party | Candidate | Votes | % |
|---|---|---|---|
| Republican | Ronda Storms (incumbent) | 109,846 | 99.40% |
| Write-in | Victoria Brake | 661 | 0.60% |
| Total votes | | 110,507 | 100.0% |
| Republican hold | | | |

=== District 12 ===
District 12 election, 2010
| Party | Candidate | Votes | % |
|---|---|---|---|
| Republican | Jim Norman | 85,324 | 99.20% |
| Write-in | Derek Crabb | 364 | 0.40% |
| Write-in | Kimberly Renspie | 348 | 0.40% |
| Total votes | | 86,038 | 100.0% |
| Republican hold | | | |

=== District 14 ===
District 14 election, 2010
| Party | Candidate | Votes | % |
|---|---|---|---|
| Republican | Steve Oelrich (incumbent) | 70,789 | 53.80% |
| Democratic | Perry McGriff | 60,725 | 46.20% |
| Total votes | | 131,514 | 100.0% |
| Republican hold | | | |

=== District 16 ===
District 16 election, 2010
| Party | Candidate | Votes | % |
|---|---|---|---|
| Republican | Jack Latvala | 83,396 | 64.00% |
| Democratic | Nina Hayden | 46,942 | 36.00% |
| Total votes | | 130,340 | 100.0% |
| Republican gain from Democratic | | | |

=== District 18 ===
District 18 election, 2010
| Party | Candidate | Votes | % |
|---|---|---|---|
| Democratic | Arthenia Joyner (incumbent) | | 100.0% |
| Total votes | | | 100.0% |
| Democratic hold | | | |

=== District 20 ===
District 20 election, 2010
| Party | Candidate | Votes | % |
|---|---|---|---|
| Republican | Alan Hays | 135,175 | 67.20% |
| Democratic | Eunice Garbutt | 66,025 | 32.80% |
| Total votes | | 201,200 | 100.0% |
| Republican hold | | | |

=== District 22 ===
District 22 election, 2010
| Party | Candidate | Votes | % |
|---|---|---|---|
| Republican | David Simmons | | 100.0% |
| Total votes | | | 100.0% |
| Republican hold | | | |

=== District 24 ===
District 24 election, 2010
| Party | Candidate | Votes | % |
|---|---|---|---|
| Republican | Thad Altman (incumbent) | 103,357 | 67.20% |
| Independent | W. Steven Edmonds, Jr. | 50,478 | 32.80% |
| Total votes | | 153,835 | 100.0% |
| Republican hold | | | |

=== District 25 ===
District 25 election, 2010
| Party | Candidate | Votes | % |
|---|---|---|---|
| Republican | Ellyn Setnor Bogdanoff | 82,583 | 57.70% |
| Democratic | Kelly Skidmore | 53,958 | 37.70% |
| Independent | Miranda Rosenberg | 6,694 | 4.70% |
| Total votes | | 143,235 | 100.0% |
| Republican hold | | | |

=== District 26 ===
District 26 election, 2010
| Party | Candidate | Votes | % |
|---|---|---|---|
| Republican | Mike Haridopolos (incumbent) | | 100.0% |
| Total votes | | | 100.0% |
| Republican hold | | | |

=== District 27 ===
District 27 election, 2010
| Party | Candidate | Votes | % |
|---|---|---|---|
| Republican | Lizbeth Benacquisto | 79,750 | 54.10% |
| Democratic | Kevin Rader | 67,621 | 45.90% |
| Total votes | | 147,371 | 100.0% |
| Republican gain from Democratic | | | |

=== District 28 ===
District 28 election, 2010
| Party | Candidate | Votes | % |
|---|---|---|---|
| Republican | Joe Negron (incumbent) | | 100.0% |
| Total votes | | | 100.0% |
| Republican hold | | | |

=== District 30 ===
District 30 election, 2010
| Party | Candidate | Votes | % |
|---|---|---|---|
| Democratic | Maria Sachs | | 100.0% |
| Total votes | | | 100.0% |
| Democratic hold | | | |

=== District 32 ===
District 32 election, 2010
| Party | Candidate | Votes | % |
|---|---|---|---|
| Democratic | Jeremy Ring (incumbent) | 62,049 | 63.40% |
| Republican | Patrick Laffey | 35,813 | 36.60% |
| Total votes | | 97,862 | 100.0% |
| Democratic hold | | | |

=== District 34 ===
District 34 election, 2010
| Party | Candidate | Votes | % |
|---|---|---|---|
| Democratic | Nan Rich (incumbent) | | 100.0% |
| Total votes | | | 100.0% |
| Democratic hold | | | |

=== District 35 ===
District 35 election, 2010
| Party | Candidate | Votes | % |
|---|---|---|---|
| Democratic | Gwen Margolis | 62,237 | 77.80% |
| Independent | Corey Poitier | 17,780 | 22.20% |
| Total votes | | 80,017 | 100.0% |
| Democratic hold | | | |

=== District 36 ===
District 36 election, 2010
| Party | Candidate | Votes | % |
|---|---|---|---|
| Republican | Miguel Díaz de la Portilla | 58,138 | 99.90% |
| Write-in | Luisa Artiles | 31 | 0.10% |
| Write-in | Alberto E. Fortes | 6 | 0.00% |
| Total votes | | 58,175 | 100.0% |
| Republican hold | | | |

=== District 38 ===
District 38 election, 2010
| Party | Candidate | Votes | % |
|---|---|---|---|
| Republican | Anitere Flores | 65,133 | 68.20% |
| Democratic | Les Gerson | 30,409 | 31.80% |
| Total votes | | 95,542 | 100.0% |
| Republican hold | | | |

=== District 40 ===
District 40 election, 2010
| Party | Candidate | Votes | % |
|---|---|---|---|
| Republican | René García | 56,322 | 100.0% |
| Write-in | Alexis Dominguez | 20 | 0.00% |
| Total votes | | 56,342 | 100.0% |
| Republican hold | | | |
