= 2012 Florida Senate election =

- 6 November 2014

All 40 seats in the Florida Senate 21 seats needed for a majority
- Registered: 11,934,446
- Turnout: 8,538,264 (71.5%)
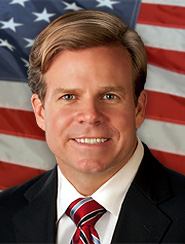

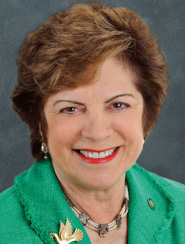
	Majority party	Minority party
Leader	Mike Haridopolos (retired)	Nan Rich (retired)
Party	Republican	Democratic
Leader since	November 16, 2010	November 16, 2010
Leader's seat	District 26	District 34
Last election	28	12
Seats after	26	14
Seat change	▼2	▲2
President before election
Mike Haridopolos
Republican
Elected President
Don Gaetz
Republican

The 2012 Florida Senate election was held on 6 November 2012 to elect all 40 members to the Florida Senate. Prior to the election, 26 seats were held by Republicans and 14 seats were held by Democrats. The general election saw the Democratic Party gain two seats, but with Republicans retaining their majority in the State Senate.

== Results ==
=== District 1 ===
2012 Florida's 1st Senate district election
Party	Candidate	Votes	%
Republican	Don Gaetz	160,016	74.4
Independent	Richard Harrison	55,018	25.5
Total votes			100.0
Republican win			

=== District 2 ===
2012 Florida's 2nd Senate district election
Party	Candidate	Votes	%
Republican	Greg Evers	183,640	99.9
Democratic	Joshua W. Hartigan (write-in)	234	0.1
Total votes			100.0
Republican win			

=== District 3 ===
2012 Florida's 3rd Senate district election
Party	Candidate	Votes	%
Democratic	Bill Montford	165,634	72.8
Republican	John Shaw	61,956	27.2
Total votes			100.0%
Democratic win			

=== District 4 ===
2012 Florida's 4th Senate district election
Party	Candidate	Votes	%
Republican	Aaron Bean	144,352	62.2
Democratic	Nancy Soderberg	87,766	37.8
Total votes			100.0
Republican win			

=== District 5 ===
2012 Florida's 5th Senate district election
Party	Candidate	Votes	%
Republican	Charles Dean	Unopposed	

=== District 6 ===
2012 Florida's 6th Senate district election
Party	Candidate	Votes	%
Republican	John Thrasher	139,941	58.7
Democratic	Kathleen Trued	98,280	41.3
Total votes			100.0
Republican win			

=== District 7 ===
2012 Florida's 7th Senate district election
Party	Candidate	Votes	%
Republican	Rob Bradley	123,261	57.7
Democratic	William Mazzota	90,285	42.3
Total votes			100.0
Republican win			

=== District 8 ===
2012 Florida's 8th Senate district election
Party	Candidate	Votes	%
Republican	Dorothy L. Hukill	115,897	57.0
Democratic	Frank T. Bruno	87,339	43.0
Total votes			100.0
Republican win			

=== District 9 ===
2012 Florida's 9th Senate district election
Party	Candidate	Votes	%
Democratic	Audrey Gibson	72,676	63.6
Republican	Cherron "CC" Newby	126,946	36.4
Total votes			100.0
Democratic win			

=== District 10 ===
2012 Florida's 10th Senate district election
Party	Candidate	Votes	%
Republican	David Simmons	117,784	55.5
Democratic	Leo Cruz	94,483	44.5
Independent	James Patrick Adamczyk (write-in)	5	0.0
Total votes			100.0
Republican win			

=== District 11 ===
2012 Florida's 11th Senate district election
Party	Candidate	Votes	%
Republican	Alan Hays	163,223	71.6
Independent	John Iler	64,863	28.4
Total votes			100.0
Republican win			

=== District 12 ===
2012 Florida's 12th Senate district election
Party	Candidate	Votes	%
Democratic	Geraldine F. Thompson	111,369	69.1
Republican	Fritz Jackson Seide	49,741	30.9
Total votes			100.0
Democratic win			

=== District 13 ===
2012 Florida's 12th Senate district election
Party	Candidate	Votes	%
Republican	Andy Gardiner	117,422	55.4
Democratic	Christopher Charles Pennington	94,514	44.6
Total votes			100.0
Republican win			

=== District 14 ===
2012 Florida's 14th Senate district election
Party	Candidate	Votes	%
Democratic	Darren Soto	113,222	70.0
Republican	William McBride	48,440	30.0
Total votes			100.0
Democratic win			

=== District 15 ===
2012 Florida's 15th Senate district election
Party	Candidate	Votes	%
Republican	Kelli Stargel	113,231	58.5
Democratic	Stego Blue	80,429	41.5
Total votes			100.0
Republican win			

=== District 16 ===
2012 Florida's 16th Senate district election
Party	Candidate	Votes	%
Republican	Thad Altman	143,459	62.8
Democratic	Dominic A Fallo	84,824	37.2
Total votes			100.0
Republican win			

=== District 17 ===
2012 Florida's 17th Senate district election
Party	Candidate	Votes	%
Republican	John Legg	Unopposed	

=== District 18 ===
2012 Florida's 18th Senate district election
Party	Candidate	Votes	%
Republican	Wilton Simpson	Unopposed	

=== District 19 ===
2012 Florida's 19th Senate district election
Party	Candidate	Votes	%
Democratic	Arthenia Joyner	Unopposed	

=== District 20 ===
2012 Florida's 20th Senate district election
Party	Candidate	Votes	%
Republican	Jack Latvala	127,927	57.8
Democratic	Ashley M. Rhodes-Courter	93,296	42.2
Total votes			100.0
Republican win			

=== District 21 ===
2012 Florida's 21st Senate district election
Party	Candidate	Votes	%
Republican	Denise Grimsley	107,136	57.4
Democratic	Stacy Anderson McCland	79,500	42.6
Total votes			100.0
Republican win			

=== District 22 ===
2012 Florida's 22nd Senate district election
Party	Candidate	Votes	%
Republican	Jeff Brandes	157,438	99.7
Independent	Raymond Alan Baker (write-in)	481	0.3
Total votes			100.0
Republican win			

=== District 23 ===
2012 Florida's 23rd Senate district election
Party	Candidate	Votes	%
Republican	Garrett Richter	Unopposed	

=== District 24 ===
2012 Florida's 24th Senate district election
Party	Candidate	Votes	%
Republican	Tom Lee	104,843	54.0
Democratic	Elizabeth Belcher	89,195	46.0
Independent	Randolph Link (write-in)	3	0.0
Total votes			100.0
Republican win			

=== District 25 ===
2012 Florida's 25th Senate district election
Party	Candidate	Votes	%
Democratic	Joseph Abruzzo	124,675	57.1
Republican	Melanie Peterson	93,549	42.9
Total votes			100.0
Democratic win			

=== District 26 ===
2012 Florida's 26th Senate district election
Party	Candidate	Votes	%
Republican	Bill Galvano	122,782	59.1
Democratic	Paula House	85,123	40.9
Total votes			100.0
Republican win			

=== District 27 ===
2012 Florida's 27th Senate district election
Party	Candidate	Votes	%
Democratic	Jeff Clemens	127,365	99.9
Republican	Travis Genard Harris	105	0.1
Total votes			100.0
Democratic win			

=== District 28 ===
2012 Florida's 23rd Senate district election
Party	Candidate	Votes	%
Republican	Nancy Detert	Unopposed	

=== District 29 ===
2012 Florida's 29th Senate district election
Party	Candidate	Votes	%
Democratic	Jeremy Ring	124,784	64.3
Republican	Soren Swensen	69,393	35.7
Total votes			100.0
Democratic win			

=== District 30 ===
2012 Florida's 30th Senate district election
Party	Candidate	Votes	%
Republican	Lizbeth Benacquisto	123,794	62.3
Democratic	Debbie Jordan	74,871	37.7
Total votes			100.0
Republican win			

=== District 31 ===
2012 Florida's 31st Senate district election
Party	Candidate	Votes	%
Democratic	Christopher "Chris" Smith	147,618	84.4
Republican	Christopher "Chris" Smithmyer	27,222	15.6
Total votes			100.0
Democratic win			

=== District 32 ===
2012 Florida's 32nd Senate district election
Party	Candidate	Votes	%
Republican	Joe Negron	136,464	60.4
Democratic	Ray D'Amiano	89,463	39.6
Total votes			100.0
Republican win			

=== District 33 ===
2012 Florida's 33rd Senate district election
Party	Candidate	Votes	%
Democratic	Eleanor Sobel	130,806	67.6
Republican	Christopher "Chris" Smithmyer	62,683	32.4
Independent	Rita Gambardella	2	0.0
Total votes			100.0
Democratic win			

=== District 34 ===
2012 Florida's 34th Senate district election
Party	Candidate	Votes	%
Democratic	Maria Sachs	122,430	52.8
Republican	Ellyn Bogdanoff	109,329	47.2
Total votes			100.0
Democratic win			

=== District 35 ===
2012 Florida's 35th Senate district election
Party	Candidate	Votes	%
Democratic	Gwen Margolis	103,109	61.7
Republican	John Daniel Couriel	63,929	38.3
Total votes			100.0
Democratic win			

=== District 36 ===
2012 Florida's 36th Senate district election
Party	Candidate	Votes	%
Democratic	Oscar Braynon	Unopposed	

=== District 37 ===
2012 Florida's 37th Senate district election
Party	Candidate	Votes	%
Republican	Anitere Flores	Unopposed	

=== District 38 ===
2012 Florida's 38th Senate district election
Party	Candidate	Votes	%
Republican	René García	Unopposed	

=== District 39 ===
2012 Florida's 35th Senate district election
Party	Candidate	Votes	%
Democratic	Dwight Bullard	102,512	70.5
Republican	Scott Hopes	42,922	29.5
Total votes			100.0
Democratic win			

=== District 40 ===
2012 Florida's 40th Senate district election
Party	Candidate	Votes	%
Republican	Miguel Díaz de la Portilla	Unopposed	
