= 2014 Florida Senate election =

- November 4, 2014

20 out of 40 seats in the Florida Senate 21 seats needed for a majority
- Turnout: 50.5%
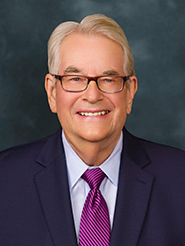

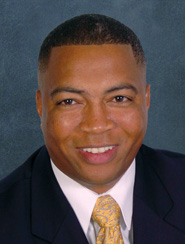
	Majority party	Minority party
Leader	Don Gaetz	Chris Smith
Party	Republican	Democratic
Leader since	November 20, 2012	November 20, 2012
Leader's seat	District 1	District 29
Last election	26	14
Seats after	26	14
Seat change	Steady	Steady
President before election
Don Gaetz
Republican
Elected President
Andy Gardiner
Republican

The 2014 Florida Senate election was held on November 4, 2014, to determine which party would control the Florida Senate for the following two years in the 2015-2016 Florida Legislature. The 20 even-numbered seats out of the 40 seats in the Florida Senate were up for election and the primary occurred on August 26, 2014. Prior to the election, 26 seats were held by Republicans and 14 seats were held by Democrats. The general election saw neither party gain nor lose any seats, meaning that Republicans retained their majority in the State Senate.

== Predictions ==
Source	Ranking	As of
Governing	Safe R	October 20, 2014

== Closest races ==
Seats where the margin of victory was under 10%:

1. District 34, 4.16%

== Results ==
=== District 2 ===
District 2 election, 2014
Party	Candidate	Votes	%
Republican	Greg Evers (incumbent)		100.0%
Total votes			100.0%
Republican hold			

=== District 4 ===
District 4 election, 2014
Party	Candidate	Votes	%
Republican	Aaron Bean (incumbent)		100.0%
Total votes			100.0%
Republican hold			

=== District 6 ===
District 6 election, 2014
Party	Candidate	Votes	%
Republican	John Thrasher (incumbent)	105,901	58.16%
Democratic	Kathleen Trued	66,786	36.68%
Independent	Greg Feldman	9,388	5.16%
Total votes		182,075	100.0%
Republican hold			

=== District 8 ===
District 8 election, 2014
Party	Candidate	Votes	%
Republican	Dorothy Hukill (incumbent)		100.0%
Total votes			100.0%
Republican hold			

=== District 10 ===
District 10 election, 2014
Party	Candidate	Votes	%
Republican	David Simmons (incumbent)	101,241	69.25%
Independent	Walter Osborne	44,959	30.75%
Total votes		146,200	100.0%
Republican hold			

=== District 12 ===
District 12 election, 2014
Party	Candidate	Votes	%
Democratic	Geraldine Thompson (incumbent)	67,084	62.97%
Republican	Edward DeAguilera	39,456	37.03%
Total votes		106,540	100.0%
Democratic hold			

=== District 14 ===
District 14 election, 2014
Party	Candidate	Votes	%
Democratic	Darren Soto (incumbent)	71,029	75.04%
Independent	Devin Norton	23,625	24.96%
Total votes		94,654	100.0%
Democratic hold			

=== District 16 ===
District 16 election, 2014
Party	Candidate	Votes	%
Republican	Thad Altman (incumbent)		100.0%
Total votes			100.0%
Republican hold			

=== District 18 ===
District 18 election, 2014
Party	Candidate	Votes	%
Republican	Wilton Simpson (incumbent)		100.0%
Total votes			100.0%
Republican hold			

=== District 20 ===
District 20 election, 2014
Party	Candidate	Votes	%
Republican	Jack Latvala (incumbent)	120,277	71.62%
Libertarian	Tony Caso	47,652	28.38%
Total votes		167,929	100.0%
Republican hold			

=== District 22 ===
District 22 election, 2014
Party	Candidate	Votes	%
Republican	Jeff Brandes (incumbent)	101,983	57.69%
Democratic	Judithanne McLauchlan	74,804	42.31%
Total votes		176,787	100.0%
Republican hold			

=== District 24 ===
District 24 election, 2014
Party	Candidate	Votes	%
Republican	Tom Lee (incumbent)	104,925	99.54%
Independent	Brandon R. Thebeau	379	0.36%
Independent	Steven P. Warren	106	0.10%
Total votes		105,410	100.0%
Republican hold			

=== District 26 ===
District 26 election, 2014
Party	Candidate	Votes	%
Republican	Bill Galvano (incumbent)		100.0%
Total votes			100.0%
Republican hold			

=== District 28 ===
District 28 election, 2014
Party	Candidate	Votes	%
Republican	Nancy Detert (incumbent)		100.0%
Total votes			100.0%
Republican hold			

=== District 30 ===
District 30 election, 2014
Party	Candidate	Votes	%
Republican	Lizbeth Benacquisto (incumbent)		100.0%
Total votes			100.0%
Republican hold			

=== District 32 ===
District 32 election, 2014
Party	Candidate	Votes	%
Republican	Joe Negron (incumbent)	117,320	66.76%
Democratic	Bruno Moore	58,388	33.22%
Independent	Matthew Joshua Loew	41	0.02%
Total votes		175,749	100.0%
Republican hold			

=== District 34 ===
District 34 election, 2014
Party	Candidate	Votes	%
Democratic	Maria Sachs (incumbent)	87,340	52.08%
Republican	Ellyn Bogdanoff	80,353	47.92%
Total votes		167,693	100.0%
Democratic hold			

=== District 36 ===
District 36 election, 2014
Party	Candidate	Votes	%
Democratic	Oscar Braynon (incumbent)	96,445	99.95%
Independent	William Burton Moreland	47	0.05%
Total votes		96,492	100.0%
Democratic hold			

=== District 38 ===
District 38 election, 2014
Party	Candidate	Votes	%
Republican	René García (incumbent)		100.0%
Total votes			100.0%
Republican hold			

=== District 40 ===
District 40 election, 2014
Party	Candidate	Votes	%
Republican	Miguel Díaz de la Portilla (incumbent)		100.0%
Total votes			100.0%
Republican hold			
