= Senator Constantine =

Senator Constantine may refer to:

- Dow Constantine (born 1961), Washington State Senate
- Lee Constantine (born 1952), Florida State Senate
