= Senator Flake (disambiguation) =

Jeff Flake (born 1962) was a U.S. Senator from Arizona from 2013 to 2019. Senator Flake may refer to:

- Jake Flake (1935–2008), Arizona State Senate
- Jeff Flake (Florida politician) (1877–1971), Florida State Senate
