= Jeff Flake (Florida politician) =

American politician (1877–1971)

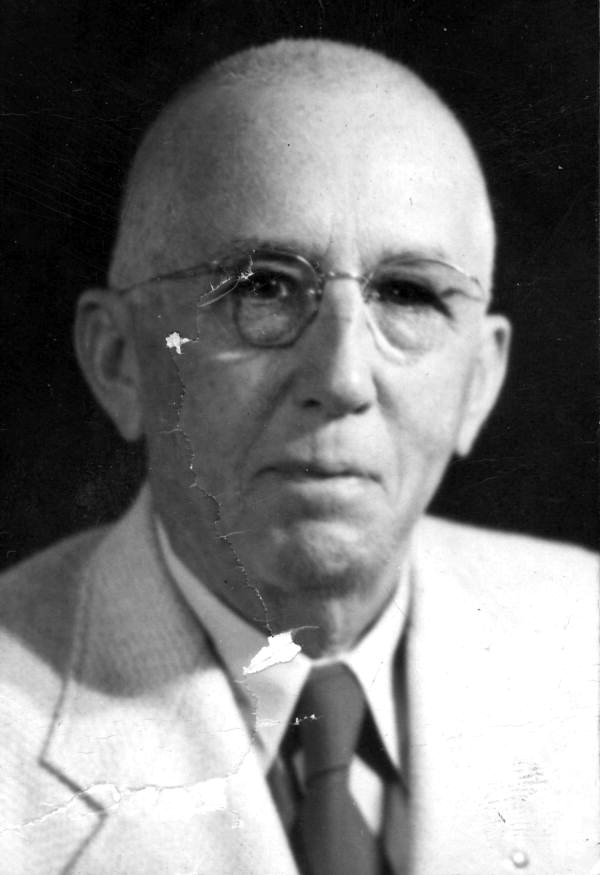

Member of the Florida Senate from the 27th district
- In office 1947
- Preceded by: Wilbur C. King
- Succeeded by: James W. Moore

Personal details
- Born: Samuel Jefferson Flake; June 25, 1877 North Carolina, U.S.
- Died: May 30, 1971 (aged 93) Black Mountain, North Carolina, U.S.
- Party: Democratic
- Occupation: missionary/fruit grower

Samuel Jefferson "Jeff" Flake (June 25, 1877 – May 30, 1971) was an American politician in the state of Florida. He served in the Florida Senate in 1947 as a Democratic member for the 27th district.
