= Rosalind Osgood =

American politician

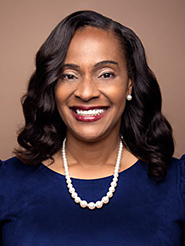

Member of the Florida Senate
- Incumbent
- Assumed office March 8, 2022
- Preceded by: Perry Thurston
- Constituency: 33rd district (2022); 32nd district (2022–present)

Personal details
- Born: 1965 or 1966 (age 60–61) Fort Lauderdale, Florida, U.S.
- Party: Democratic
- Education: Florida A&M University (attended); Nova Southeastern University (BA, MA, DPA); New Orleans Baptist Theological Seminary (MDiv)

Rosalind Osgood (born 1965/1966) is an American politician and a Democratic member of the Florida Senate. She is president and CEO of non-profit Mount Olive Development Corp and served on the Broward County School Board for more than a decade.

== Early life ==
A native of Broward County, Florida, Osgood graduated from Fort Lauderdale High School. She earned a master’s degree and a doctorate in public administration from Nova Southeastern University, and later received a Master of Divinity from the New Orleans Baptist Theological Seminary.

== Career ==
Osgood served as a member of the Broward County School Board from 2012 until 2022, when she resigned to run for a seat on the Florida State Senate. She defeated Republican Joseph Carter in a special election to become state senator for Broward County’s Senate District 33 on March 8, 2022.

During the 2022 redistricting process, Osgood’s district was renumbered 32 and its boundaries shifted to the south. Osgood is running for re-election to the Florida State Senate to represent District 32 and is on the ballot for the Democratic primary on August 23, 2022.

In addition to her work in public service, Osgood is an associate pastor of the New Mount Olive Baptist Church in Fort Lauderdale and the first female ordained minister in the church’s history. She serves as president and CEO of the Mount Olive Development Corp., the church’s community development arm. She operates her own ministry and, in 2013, became the first female chaplain for the City of Fort Lauderdale Police Department.
