= Mary Brandenburg =

American politician

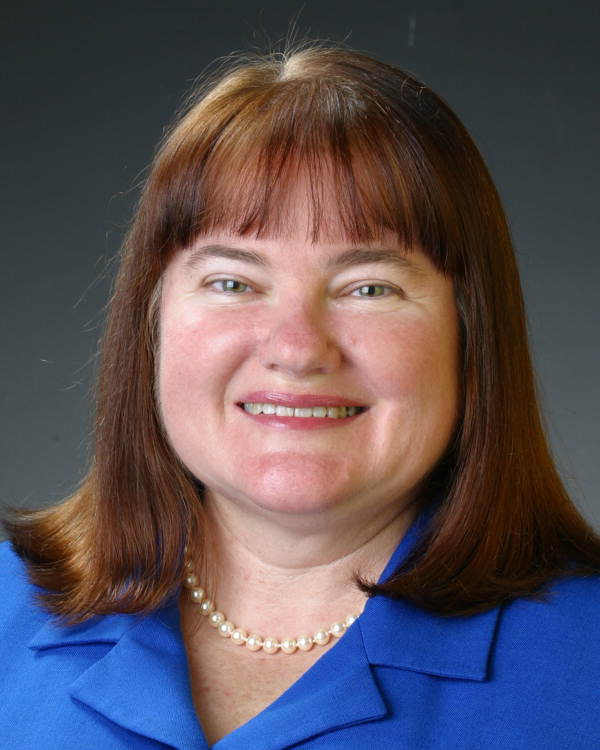
- Brandenburg in 2002

Member of the Florida House of Representatives from the 89th district
- In office November 5, 2002 – November 2, 2010
- Preceded by: Irving Slosberg
- Succeeded by: Jeff Clemens

City Commissioner For the City of West Palm Beach, Florida District 3
- In office 1998–2002

Personal details
- Born: May 12, 1949 (age 77) Rochester, New York
- Party: Democratic
- Spouse: Pete Brandenburg
- Education: University of Florida A.A., 1969; Florida Atlantic University, B.A., 1972, M.B.A., 1980
- Committees: Health Care Appropriations Committee (Ranking Democrat), Agriculture & Natural Resources Policy Committee

Mary Brandenburg (born May 12, 1949) is an American politician in the state of Florida. She was a representative in the Florida House of Representatives between 2002 and 2010.

== Early life ==
Brandenburg was born on May 12, 1949, in Rochester, New York. She moved to Florida in 1957. She received her AA degree from the University of Florida in 1969 before attending Florida Atlantic University where she received her BA in 1972 and her MBA in 1980. She lives in West Palm Beach, Florida, with her husband, Pete Brandenburg.

== Political career ==
Brandenburg was first elected as a representative in the Florida House of Representatives in the 2002 general election.

== Political positions ==
=== Equality in adoption rights ===
Brandenburg has continually pushed for equality in Florida's adoption laws and has filed legislation to allow gay residents to adopt since 2007.

=== Salvia divinorum ===
In March 2008, it was reported that Brandenburg and Senator Evelyn Lynn had proposed bills to make possession of Salvia divinorum a felony punishable by up to five years in prison. Salvia divinorum is a psychoactive herb which can induce strong dissociative effects. It has a long continuing tradition of use as an entheogen by indigenous Mazatec shamans, who use it to facilitate visionary states of consciousness during spiritual healing sessions. Salvia's sale and possession is currently illegal in a number of other American states and some other countries.

Brandenburg's House bill number was HB 1363. Lynn's Senate bill was SB340. There was also SB1612. All bills proposed including Salvia divinorum & Salvinorin A on Florida's Schedule I list of controlled substances. Brandenburg's bill was passed unanimously and became law on July 1, 2008. The bill provides an exception for medical use approved by the FDA.

Opponents of prohibitive Salvia restrictions argue that such reactions are largely due to an inherent prejudice and a particular cultural bias rather than any actual balance of evidence, pointing out inconsistencies in attitudes toward other more toxic and addictive drugs such as alcohol and nicotine. (Note: The worldwide number of alcohol-related deaths is calculated at over 2,000 people per day, in the US the number is over 300 deaths per day.) While not objecting to some form of regulatory legal control, in particular with regard to the sale to minors or sale of enhanced high-strength extracts, most Salvia proponents otherwise argue against stricter legislation. (Note: Those advocating consideration of Salvia divinorum's potential for beneficial use in a modern context argue that more could be learned from Mazatec culture, where Salvia is not really associated with notions of drug taking at all and it is rather considered as a spiritual sacrament. In light of this it is argued that Salvia divinorum could be better understood more positively as an entheogen rather than pejoratively as a hallucinogen.)

== Citations ==
Political offices
Preceded by Irving Slosberg	Florida House of Representatives; District 89; 2002–2010	Succeeded by Jeff Clemens
