= Ray Rodrigues =

American politician (born 1970)

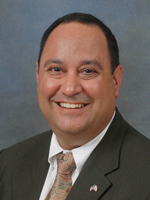

12th Chancellor of the State University System of Florida
- Incumbent
- Assumed office January 1, 2023
- Preceded by: Marshall Criser III

Member of the Florida Senate from the 27th district
- In office November 3, 2020 – November 8, 2022
- Preceded by: Lizbeth Benacquisto
- Succeeded by: Ben Albritton

Majority Leader of the Florida House of Representatives
- In office November 21, 2016 – November 19, 2018
- Preceded by: Dana Young
- Succeeded by: Dane Eagle

Member of the Florida House of Representatives from the 76th district
- In office November 6, 2012 – November 3, 2020
- Preceded by: Kathleen Passidomo
- Succeeded by: Adam Botana

Personal details
- Born: April 17, 1970 (age 56) Pensacola, Florida, U.S.
- Party: Republican
- Spouse: Ruth Rodrigues
- Children: 1
- Education: Berry College (BA); Florida Gulf Coast University (MPA)

Raymond Wesley Rodrigues (born April 17, 1970) is the 12th chancellor of the State University System of Florida since 2023. Previously, he served four terms in the Florida House of Representatives, representing southern and coastal Lee County from 2012 to 2020 and one term in the Florida Senate from 2020 to 2022. His campaign website describes him as conservative.

== History ==
Rodrigues was born in Pensacola and attended Berry College in Rome, Georgia, where he received a scholarship from the WinShape Foundation and graduated in 1992. Following graduation, he moved to Estero, where he became an active member of the community, eventually working as the Budget Manager for the College of Arts and Sciences at Florida Gulf Coast University and getting his MPA there in 2017.

Rodrigues has been active in the Lee County Republican Party since 1995, serving in various capacities including vice-chairman from 2010 to 2012. When the Florida House of Representatives districts were redrawn in 2012, Rodrigues ran for the newly created 76th District. He faced off against former state representative Michael J. Grant and Chauncey Solinger in the Republican General Primary. Rodrigues won with nearly 50% of the vote to Grant's 28% and Solinger's 22%. Rodrigues was unopposed in the general election.

== Florida House of Representatives ==
=== First term ===
==== 2013 session ====
During his first session in 2013, Rodrigues sponsored legislation to strengthen Florida's government in sunshine laws that guaranteed the public's right to speak at official government meetings, which passed the legislature nearly unanimously. The bill was signed into law by the Governor.

Additionally, during that 2013 Session, he authored legislation that would allow overseas military absentee voters to have their ballots fully counted as long as they are postmarked by Election Day and received within ten days of Election Day. Previously, ballots received within ten days of Election Day were only counted for federal offices. He noted, "Our military voters overseas are sacrificing for us to have the opportunity to hold elections. I think the right thing to do is to guarantee their full participation; I wanted to see their entire ballot counted." The bill was amended onto the Election Reform bill that passed both the House and Senate and was signed into law by the Governor.

Finally in 2013 Rodrigues also worked with fellow state representative Cary Pigman to Prime Co-sponsor the “Infants Born Alive Act” legislation which provides that an infant born alive during or immediately after an attempted abortion is entitled to the same rights as any other child born during a natural birth. The bill also requires that the same degree of professional care be used to preserve the life and health of these born alive infants. Furthermore, an infant born alive is required to be immediately transferred and admitted into a hospital. The bill passed both the House and Senate and was signed into law by the Governor.

==== 2014 session ====
As Southwest Florida continued to grow in 2014, Rodrigues sponsored a bill to incorporate the Village of Estero as Lee County's first new city in 15 years, which provided local control and direct representation for its residents. The bill passed both the House and Senate and was signed into law by the Governor. The referendum went on to pass with 87% voting in favor.

During the 2014 re-election campaign for his sophomore term, Ray Rodrigues was unopposed in the Republican Primary. He was challenged by Democratic candidate Charles Messina in the general election. Rodrigues won reelection by defeating Messina 68% to 32%.

=== Second term ===
==== 2015 session ====
In 2015 Rodrigues sponsored “the anti-speed trap bill”, a bill that prohibited traffic enforcement agencies from establishing traffic citation quotas and required counties and municipalities to report the total revenue received from traffic citations that exceed 33% of total expenses. The traffic enforcement bill was crafted to prevent law enforcement agencies to rely on traffic citations collected at speed traps to fund their budgets. The bill passed both the House and Senate and was signed into law by the Governor.

That same year Rodrigues sponsored the Achieving a Better Life Experience (ABLE) Act, which provides individuals with disabilities tax free saving plans to be used for costs associated with their disability and education and job training. The ABLE act also increased the amount that can be earned and saved without losing eligibility for state benefits. Rodrigues, who has a son with special needs, added a personal sentiment to this bill stating that with the creation of ABLE, “I know that my son will have the opportunity to pursue his potential and to do his very best with the full knowledge that if he’s successful that’s great, and if he’s not successful at achieving independence, he won’t be punished for trying.” The bill passed both the House and Senate and was signed into law by the Governor.

In 2015 and 2016, Rodrigues drafted legislation that placed a moratorium on fracking in the state of Florida until the Department of Environmental Protection completed a study on the effect of high pressure well stimulations on Florida's geology and hydrology. If the peer-reviewed study concluded that fracking could be done safely in Florida, then the bills also strengthened the regulatory framework on fracking; requiring the Department of Environmental Protection to issue a separate permit before any high-pressure well stimulation could be performed, requiring the public disclosure of all chemicals used in the fracking process and increasing the number of inspections throughout the fracking process. The bill passed in the House during both Sessions but died in the Senate each year.

==== 2016 session ====
In 2016 Rodrigues sponsored House Joint Resolution 193 which placed an amendment to the Florida Constitution on the 2016 General Primary Ballot to remove tax barriers from businesses when they install solar panels or other renewable energy devices on their properties. The amendment prevented local governments from assesses a tangible personal property tax on the solar or renewable energy equipment and it prevented local government from increasing the taxable value of the property because of the addition of solar or renewable energy equipment. The House Joint Resolution passed both the House and Senate unanimously. The Constitutional Amendment then passed with 73% of the voters approving it.

During the 2016 Session, Rodrigues also passed legislation to repeal a statutory monopoly given to an AdvoServ facility housing 30 percent of all state residents who are in group homes because of developmental and intellectual disabilities and challenging behavior. The facility had multiple allegations of abuse on its residents brought against them, including the death of Paige Elizabeth Lunsford, a 14 year old non-verbal autistic child due to dehydration while restrained to her bed. Rodrigues sponsored the legislation that repealed the statutory monopoly protecting the facility. The bill passed both the House and Senate and was signed into law by the Governor.

During the 2016 re-election campaign for his junior term, Ray Rodrigues was again unopposed in the Republican Primary. He was again challenged by Democratic candidate Charles Messina in the general election. Rodrigues won reelection by defeating Messina 73.71% to 26.29%.

=== Third term ===
==== 2017 session ====
After being re-elected in 2016 Rodrigues was appointed by Speaker Richard Corcoran to be the House Majority Leader.

As Majority Leader Rodrigues sponsored two implementation bills for Constitutional amendments approved in 2016. First, in 2017 Rodrigues sponsored the legislation implementing the solar and renewable energy constitutional amendment that passed the previous August. The legislation removed tax barriers placed on solar consumers in order to promote the use of solar energy and grow clean energy jobs in the state of Florida while enacting important consume protections. The bill passed both the House and Senate and was signed into law by the Governor.

Next, in 2017 Rodrigues also authored the implementation legislation for Medical Marijuana. During 2017 Special Session A, the bill passed both the House and Senate and was signed into law by the Governor. As part of the Implementing Bill this legislation provided an exemption from taxation on sales, use, and other transactions for marijuana and marijuana delivery devices used for medical purposes. The Implementing Bill also prohibited the smoking of medical marijuana. This prohibition of smoking led to a lawsuit filed in July 2017 by John Morgan, the author of the medical marijuana constitutional amendment.

In May 2018 Morgan prevailed in his lawsuit as Circuit Judge Karen Grievers found the ban on smoking medical marijuana to be unconstitutional.

==== 2018 session ====
In 2018, Rodrigues sponsored legislation that would prohibit the government from suing individuals merely for filing a public records requests. Many believe these lawsuits are filed as a means of discouraging individuals from following through on their request.

In filing the bill, Rodrigues recognized Florida was joining a number of cities, school boards and other government agencies across the nation who are suing people seeking documents — forcing them to decide whether it's worth fighting for their request in court — at their own expense. The bill passed the House unanimously but failed to pass in the Senate.

In 2018 Rodrigues was also the Prime Co-Sponsor on a House Resolution that requested the U.S. Congress to maintain the ban on offshore drilling in the federal waters of the Gulf of Mexico. The Resolution passed both the House and the Senate and was sent to the U.S. Congress in Washington D.C.

In 2018 Rodrigues sponsored the House companion to the “Excellence in Higher Education Act”. The legislation restored the Bright Futures Florida Academic Scholars award to 100% of tuition and fees. It also restored the Medallion Scholarship to 75% of tuition and fees. The “Excellence in Higher Education Act” also included the “Campus Free Expression Act” which protects freedom of speech on Florida university and college campuses. The bill passed both the House and Senate and was signed into law by the Governor.

In 2018 Rodrigues learned from a constituent about a major loophole in state statutes protecting students from predatory teachers. Only students under 18 were protected by the existing statutes. It was legal for sexual relations between teachers and students 18 and over. Since students in special education are often enrolled in the district until they turn 21, these students had no protection after turning 18.

Furthermore, it was learned that teachers under investigation for misconduct would often resign from the district. The resignation would end the school district's investigation. Once the investigation was ended, there would be nothing to report to the Florida Department of Education, allowing the predatory teacher to maintain their teaching certificate and move on to another school district with nothing in their file to warn the next school district.

The Rodrigues Student Safety bill:

- Made it a second degree felony for teacher or other school employees to engage in sexual relationships with students regardless of the student's age
- Prohibits schools and their employees from entering confidentiality agreements to provide job references in exchange for termination/resignation
- Mandates reporting of an educator's alleged misconduct to the parents of the student
- Requires the district to report certain complaints to the Department of Education even if the teacher is no longer employed by the district.

This bill was amended onto House Bill 495 which passed both the House and Senate and was signed into law by the Governor.

In 2018 Rodrigues recognized the growing threat of rising sea level and the need for coastal resiliency and sponsored a successful appropriation bill to provide funding to Florida International University (FIU) to conduct a study to document rising sea levels and effects on Miami Beach.

=== Fourth term ===
==== 2019 session ====
During the 2018 re-election campaign for his senior term, Ray Rodrigues was again unopposed in the Republican Primary. He was challenged by Democratic candidate David Bognor in the general election. Rodrigues won reelection by defeating Bogner 64.49% to 35.51%.

After his reelection to the Florida House of Representatives in 2018, Ray Rodrigues was appointed by Speaker Jose Oliva to chair the Health and Human Services Committee.

In January 2019, newly elected governor Ron DeSantis indicated his support for repealing the ban on smoking of medical marijuana and called on the Legislature to pass legislation repealing to ban.

In 2019 Rodrigues carried the bill repealing the ban of smoking medical marijuana. In addition to repealing the prohibition on smoking, the bill also requires doctors to submit patient data for research into the effects of smoking and requires patients under the age of 18 to have a terminal condition and get a second opinion from a pediatrician before receiving the drug. This was the first bill that passed both the House and Senate in the 2019 Session and was the first bill newly elected Governor DeSantis signed into law.

During the 2019 legislative session Rodrigues again sponsored legislation to prohibit government agencies from suing individuals who make public record requests. The bill again passed the House but failed to pass in the Senate.

As he had done in previous sessions Rodrigues again sponsored on a House Resolution that requested the U.S. Congress to maintain the ban on offshore drilling in the federal waters of the Gulf of Mexico.

After sponsoring the bill to repeal the ban on smoking medical marijuana, later in the 2019 Session, Rodrigues sponsored HB 7117 to set a 10% THC cap on medical marijuana.

Rodrigues provided three main justifications for the need of the 10% cap. The first justification he cited was a study published in 2019 by The Lancet that found that daily smokers of high THC (greater than 10%) cannabis were 5 times for likely to have a first episode of psychosis than non-smokers.

Although the authors acknowledge "further work is necessary.” The final sentence in the conclusion of their study states, “In conclusion, our findings confirm previous evidence of the harmful effect on mental health of daily use of cannabis, especially high potency types. Therefore, it is of public health importance to acknowledge alongside the potential medicinal properties of some cannabis constituents the potential adverse effects that are associated with daily cannabis use, especially of the high potency varieties.”

The second justification cited by Rodrigues was 14 other states already place THC limits on their medical marijuana programs. In effect those States have medical CBD program, not a medical marijuana program.

The final justification cited by Rodrigues was that even the government who is the most progressive in the world on cannabis, The Netherlands, home to the Amsterdam cannabis coffee shops, recognized the health dangers of high THC and long ago placed a THC cap on recreational marijuana(but not medical marijuana).

The bill was amended onto another health bill that passed in the House but failed to pass in the Senate.

Recently more reporting has been done on the danger of daily usage of high THC marijuana. Andrew Monte, an associate professor of emergency medicine and medical toxicology at the University of Colorado's school of medicine has found since legalization that statewide the overall number of ER cases associated with cannabis has gone up. “We are seeing an increase in psychosis and hallucinations, as well as anxiety and even depression and suicidality.” Monte thinks the increase in potency plays a role in all of these cases.

According to Staci Gruber, director of the Marijuana Investigations for Neuroscientific Discovery (MIND) program at the Harvard-affiliated McLean Hospital in Belmont Mass., “The negative effects of cannabis have been primarily isolated and localized to THC ……the higher levels of THC may in fact confer a greater risk for a negative outcome.”

As Chair of the Health and Human Services Committee, Rodrigues worked with Republican House members to guide 5 major healthcare reforms through the process during the 2019 Session to pass both the House and Senate. Those reforms included:

- The importation of prescription drugs from Canada.
- The repeal of the Certificate of Need for healthcare facilities like hospitals
- The allowance of telemedicine practices in the state of Florida
- The authorization of ambulatory surgical centers with a 24-hour recovery period
- The requirement that health insurers offer a plan that includes preexisting conditions, even if the Affordable Care Act is repealed or found to be unconstitutional

==== 2020 session ====
During the 2020 session, the efforts of the Florida House of Representatives on Healthcare reform continued through several key pieces of legislation that passed through the jurisdiction of the Health and Human Services Committee chaired by Ray Rodrigues.

This legislation aided Florida by increasing Floridians access to care and introducing free market forces to bring down the costs of healthcare. The legislation passed built upon healthcare reforms passed during the 2019 Session. The following Bills have been passed through both Chambers and signed by the Governor.

- Direct Care Workers- Expands the scope of practice for Registered Advanced Practicing Nurses (APRNs). This including Certified Nursing Assistants (CNAs) or Home Health Aids) HHA to administer medication to patients, preventive skin care, applying bandages, and nebulizer treatments.
- Practice of Pharmacy- Allows Pharmacists to work with physicians in an effort to manage serious health conditions and for pharmacists to provide basic health care services. This includes the pharmacists dispensing medication and counseling the patient on how to use prescription drugs and over the counter medications. Pharmacists are further allowed to test for and treat minor and nonchronic health conditions. These conditions include influenzas, streptococcus lice, skin conditions, and minor uncomplicated infections.
- Consultant Pharmacists- Creates an opportunity for consultant pharmacists to expand their services to include medication management with a licensed physician or dentist and to request and evaluate medical tests.

The following legislation has passed both the House of Representative and the Senate; awaiting the Governor's signature.

- Parental Consent for Abortions – Parental Consent is required for most medical procedures for a minor but excluded this requirement for abortion. This bill prohibits a physician from performing an abortion for any girl under the age of 18 without the consent of the parents or legal guardian of the child.
- Patient safety culture surveys – The Patient Safety Culture Surveys requires that hospitals and the ambulatory surgical centers survey the staff on the hospitals culture of patient safety. This information must be reported to the Agency of Health Care Administration (AHCA) for the public to view.
- Child Welfare Reforms - HB 7063 – Two bills were past in the 2020 Legislative Session addressing Child Welfare in the State of Florida. HB 7063 made the necessary long-term changes to this system to help the success of the children. This bill encompassed support for critical staff members to reduce turnover and prevent and decrease stress and burnout of the workers. It also creates a support system and opportunities to excel for staff that work long and tedious hours. Finally, the bill puts in higher standards and ways to measure the performance of Child Welfare partners.
- Child Welfare Reforms- HB 1105- This bill was designed in an effort to keep children in the child welfare system in a stable environment. Many times, children are moved from place to place in a matter of a week. HB 1105 helps to form positive relationships between foster parents and the biological parents of these children. The bill further encourages community-based agencies to support these positive relationships. This ultimately helping the stability of children in their temporary homes.

Ray Rodrigues’ success this session did not stop with Healthcare Issues. Post-Secondary Education is always an important topic in the Florida Legislature. HB 613, sponsored by Representative Rodrigues, creates the “State Universities of Distinction” which encourages each state university to pursue national distinction in a program unique to their institution in Florida. The bill also increases the option for Bright Future Scholars the eligibility to receive an award for 100% tuition starting in the fall of 2021 for an associate degree at a Florida College System Institution. This creates a pathway for 40,000 students to receive a free education. The bill then creates the Florida Institute of Politics and Florida State University. This Institute promote intellectual diversity, civic engagement, and provide the southeastern region with a bipartisan program like no other. Along with the Florida Institute of Politics, the Adam Smith Center for the Study of Economic Freedom was created at Florida International University. This Center concentrates on free-market economies on individual freedom and human prosperity. Finally, the bill modifies state university funding-based metrics to focus on the success rate of Pell Grant eligible as well as 2+2 associates in Arts (AA) degree transfer students.

== Florida Senate ==
=== 2020 election ===
Having served for eight consecutive years in the Florida House of Representatives, the term-limited Rodrigues ran for the Florida State Senate in Senate District 27. He ran against fellow term-limited state representative Heather Fitzenhagen in the Republican Primary. Rodrigues won the Republican Primary with 74.85% of the vote to Fitzenhagen's 25.15%.

In the 2020 General Election, Rodrigues faced Democrat Rachel Brown. Rodrigues won the general election with 60.5% of the vote compared to Brown's 39.5%.

=== First senate term ===
==== 2021 session ====
During his first legislative session in the Senate, Rodrigues was appointed chair of the Senate Committee on Governmental Oversight and Accountability. As Chair of the Governmental Oversight and Accountability Committee, Rodrigues sponsored several high-profile pieces of legislation.

Rodrigues was the Senate sponsor for SB 7072 Social Media Platforms. The bill prohibits social media platforms from willfully deplatforming a journalistic enterprise or candidate for political office. It provides that if a political candidate is deplatformed, the Florida Elections Commission may fine that social media platform $250,000 a day for statewide candidates and $25,000 a day for all other candidates. The bill also requires a social media platform to publish the standards it uses to censor, deplatform, and shadow ban users. According to the bill, these standards must be applied in a consistent manner and users must be informed of changes to these standards before they are implemented. The legislation also prohibits standards from being changed more than once every 30 days.

Rodrigues argued that the proposal was necessary to defend freedom of speech against the monopolies that various social media companies hold on online expression. He cited the deplatforming of former Florida Lieutenant Governor Jeff Kottkamp by Facebook as an example of a social media platform arbitrarily deplatforming a user without communicating the reason for such an action.

After the bill was signed into law, lawyers representing NetChoice and the Computer & Communications Industry Association filed a lawsuit against the State of Florida on that grounds that the new law infringed on the right to freedom of speech, equal protection, and due process.

Following a hearing, U.S. District Court Judge Robert Hinkle granted a temporary injunction, preventing the law from taking effect.

Another bill that Senator Rodrigues sponsored as chair of the Senate Governmental Oversight and Accountability Committee was CS/SB 84 Retirement. The bill would have closed off enrollment into the Florida Retirement System's (FRS) pension plan for most new government employees enrolled in the FRS after July 1, 2022. Instead, the employees would be required to enroll in the FRS investment plan. The bill contained an exception for members of the FRS's Special Risk Class. Rodrigues’ primary justification for the proposal was the need to curb the growth of the FRS's unfunded actuarial liability (UAL), valued at $36 billion as of July 1, 2020. With that valuation, the pension plan was funded at a level of 82%. To Rodrigues, this meant “government has made a promise it cannot keep,” necessitating changes for the pension system. The bill passed the Florida Senate by a vote of 24–16. However, the bill did not have a companion in the Florida House of Representatives and did not pass during the 2021 legislative session.

In 2021, Rodrigues once again filed his bill to prevent government agencies from suing individuals who file public records requests. The bill passed unanimously in both legislative chambers and was signed into law by Governor Ron DeSantis.

Rodrigues was also successful in shepherding the Parents’ Bill of Rights to final passage in the 2021 legislative session. The bill, HB 241, provides that the state, or any other governmental entity, “may not infringe upon the rights of a parent to direct the upbringing, education, health care, and mental health of a minor child”. Rodrigues stated that the goal of the legislation was to bring parental rights that exist in Florida statute and case law into one section of statute so that parents can find them more easily.

Rodrigues filed legislation related to gun rights during the 2021 legislative session. SB 1884 Preemption of Firearms and Ammunition Regulation clarifies that the statewide preemption on firearm and ammunition regulations also applies to unwritten policies. Rodrigues and the bill's House sponsor, Representative Cord Byrd, cited examples of local governments enacting unwritten gun policies that resulted in lawsuits against the governmental entities. Ultimately, the bill was passed by both legislative chambers and signed into law by the governor.

Rodrigues also filed CS/CS/SB 908 to create the Strong Families Tax Credit. The legislation was ultimately incorporated into the legislature's 2021 tax package, HB 7061, and signed into law by the governor. Under the law, businesses that donate to organizations that provide services related to child welfare are eligible for tax credits capped at $5 million per fiscal year.

Rodrigues worked on reforming Florida's legal notice requirements as well. To this end, he proposed what would become CS/CS/SB 402 Legal Notices. The bill provides governmental agencies the option to publish certain legal notices on a newspaper website in-lieu of print publication. Additionally, it aims to open legal notice publication to smaller, free publications by removing various statutory qualification requirements. The bill requires all legal notices to be published on the statewide legal notice website maintained by the Florida Press Association.

Rodrigues argued that the bill would modernize the legal notice system by moving notice publications online and expanding competition. Early versions of the legislation were initially met with opposition from groups such as the Florida Press Association and the American Lawyer Media Group who argued that the language would limit access to public notices. After working with these groups and a number of legislators, Rodrigues amended the bill, which lead to its unanimous passage in the Florida Senate. The bill's language was amended on to CS/HB 35 by Representative Randy Fine and passed in the Florida House. It was then signed into law by Governor Ron DeSantis.

===== 2021 higher education bill =====
Rodrigues successfully passed CS/CS/HB 233 Postsecondary Education that will annually assess the intellectual freedom and viewpoint diversity at each Florida College System institution and State University System university through a nonpartisan, objective, and statistically valid survey. In addition to the survey, the bill also prohibits these institutions from shielding students, faculty, and staff from protected free speech.

Rodrigues filed the legislation because students approached him with concerns that they could not express their views on campus. He contended that the legislation was necessary to determine if Florida's college and university campuses present diverse viewpoints and if students and faculty feel free to express their beliefs on campus. The intellectual diversity survey was inspired by similar efforts by the University of North Carolina at Chapel Hill and the University of Colorado, among others.

The bill was signed into law by Governor Ron DeSantis, who argued that the bill was necessary to strengthen critical thinking and debate in higher education.

Rodrigues also successfully passed CS/CS/CS SB 52 that clarifies that postsecondary tuition and fee exemptions apply to a student who is currently in the custody of the Department of Children and Families or a specified relative or nonrelative, or who was at the time they reached 18 years of age. The bill also authorizes a university board of trustees, subject to the approval of the board of governors, to target certain employees for bonuses by implementing a bonus scheme based on awards for work performance or employee recruitment and retention.

===== 2021 environmental efforts =====
Senator Rodrigues’ CS/CS/SB 1954 Statewide Flooding and Sea Level Rise Resilience was a priority of Governor DeSantis and legislative leadership. The bill created a number of statewide programs to address flooding and sea level rise, including:

- The Resilient Florida Grant Program to provide cities and municipalities with grants for community resilience planning
- The Comprehensive Statewide Vulnerability and Sea Level Rise Data Set and Assessment which directs the Florida Department of Environmental Protection to develop statewide data sets and assessments to determine flooding and sea level rise risk as well as identify vulnerable infrastructure and geographic areas.
- The Statewide Flooding and Sea Level Rise Resilience Plan, which directs FDEP to develop a plan consisting of ranked projects that address the risks of flooding and sea level rise in communities across Florida.

The bill also created the Florida Hub for Applied Research and Innovation within the University of South Florida's College of Marine Science. This hub will coordinate research funds across state entities, develop data and modeling, establish community-based programs, and assist with training and workforce development.

==== 2022 session ====
On July 2, 2021, Ray Rodrigues was appointed to chair the Senate Reapportionment Committee.

Florida House of Representatives
Preceded by Dana Young	Majority Leader of the Florida House of Representatives; 2016–2018	Succeeded by Dane Eagle
