= Andy Gardiner =

American politician

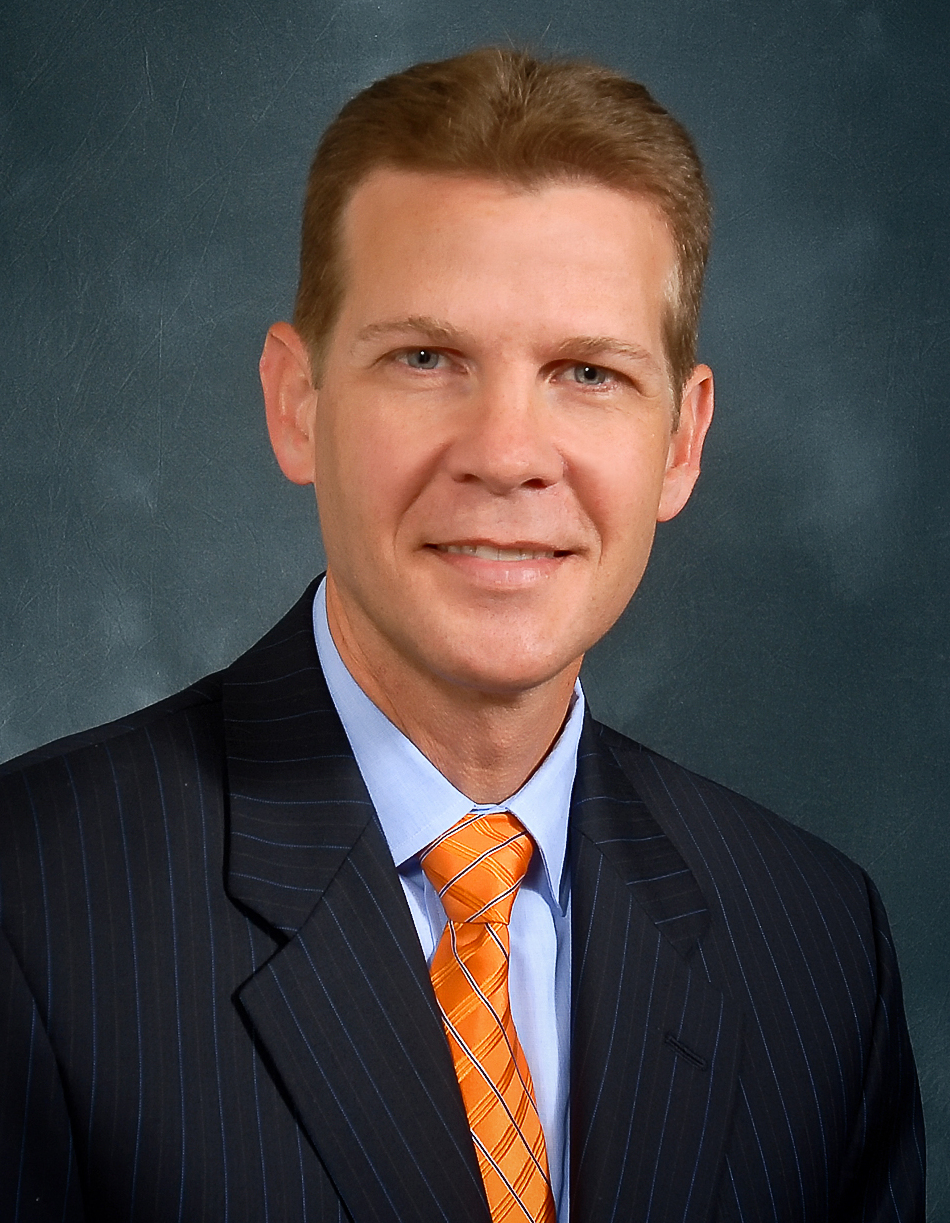

President of the Florida Senate
- In office November 18, 2014 – November 22, 2016
- Preceded by: Don Gaetz
- Succeeded by: Joe Negron

Majority Leader of the Florida Senate
- In office November 16, 2010 – November 20, 2012
- Preceded by: Alex Díaz de la Portilla
- Succeeded by: Lizbeth Benacquisto

Member of the Florida Senate
- In office November 4, 2008 – November 8, 2016
- Preceded by: Daniel Webster (9th); Dennis Jones (13th)
- Succeeded by: Audrey Gibson (9th); Linda Stewart (13th)
- Constituency: 9th district (2008-2012); 13th district (2012-2016)

Member of the Florida House of Representatives from the 40th district
- In office November 7, 2000 – November 4, 2008
- Preceded by: Bill Sublette
- Succeeded by: Eric Eisnaugle

Personal details
- Born: January 23, 1969 (age 57) Orlando, Florida, U.S.
- Party: Republican
- Spouse: Camille Gardiner
- Children: Andrew Jr. Joanna Lynn; Kathryn Lucille
- Education: Stetson University (BS)

Andy Gardiner (born January 23, 1969) is a Republican politician who served as a member of the Florida Senate, representing the 9th district from 2008 to 2012, and the 13th district, which stretches from Orlando to Titusville, from 2012 to 2016. From 2014 to 2016, Gardiner served as the President of the Florida Senate. Prior to Gardiner's election to the Senate, he served in the Florida House of Representatives, representing the 40th district from 2000 to 2008.

== History ==
Gardiner was born in Orlando, Florida, in 1969 and attended Stetson University, graduating with bachelor's degrees in political science and psychology in 1992. He worked as a legislative aide to State Representative Allen Trovillion, and helped to dispel rumors that Trovillion was not running for re-election in 1996. In 1997, he was selected to serve as President of the Apopka Chamber of Commerce, a position that he held until 2008, when he began working as the vice-president of External Affairs and Community Relations at Orlando Health.

== Florida House of Representatives ==
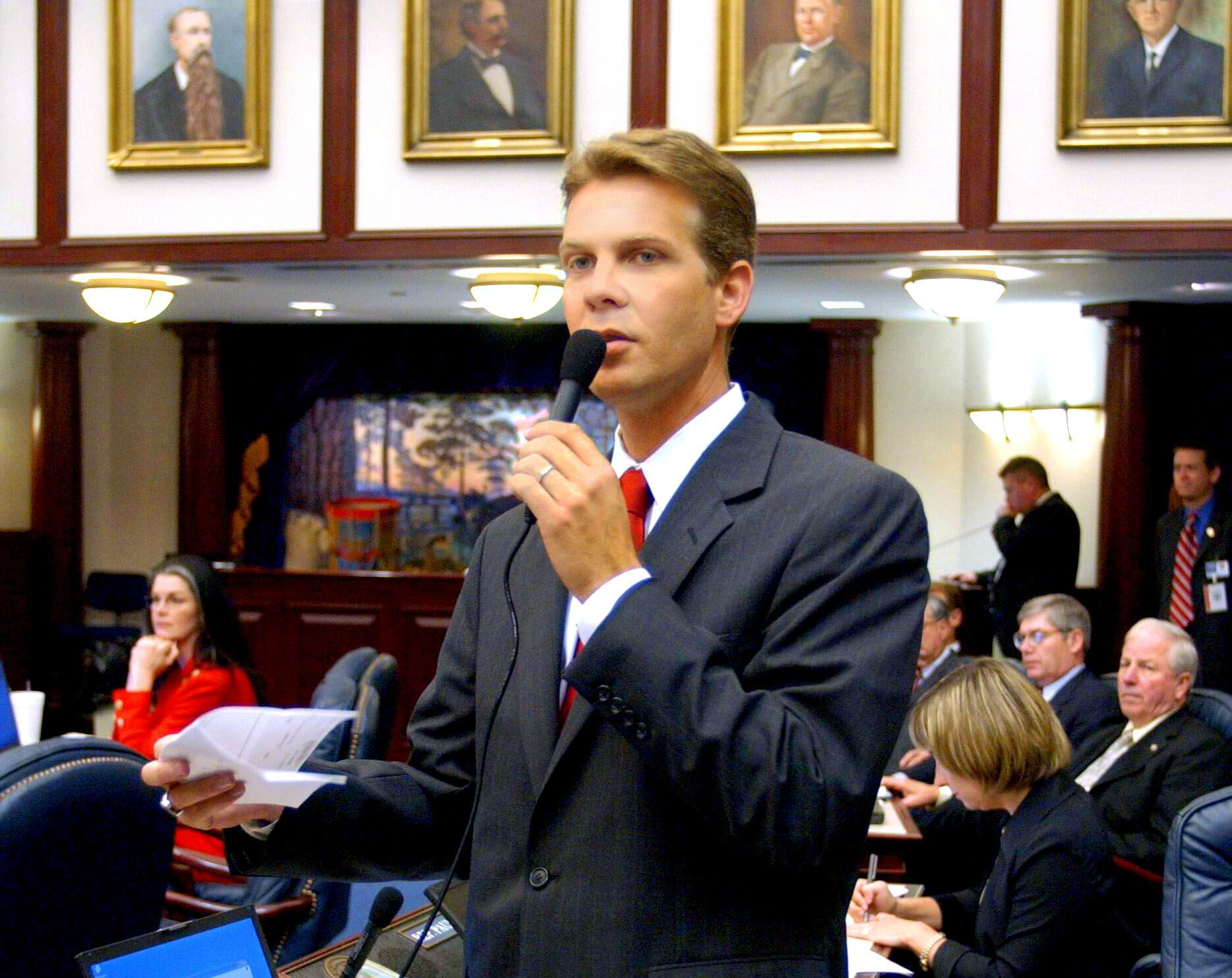
Gardiner in 2003

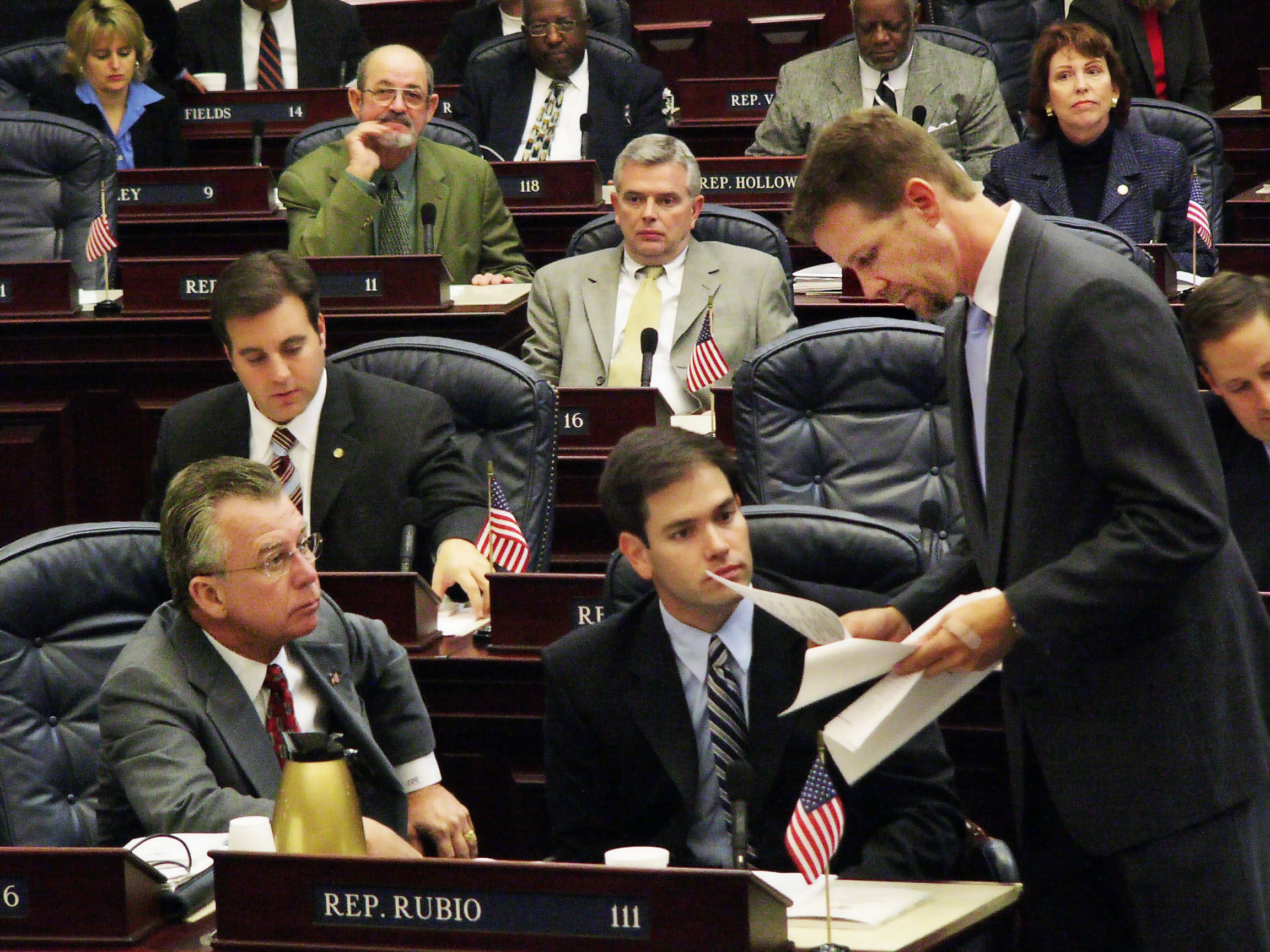
Marco Rubio and Andy Gardiner reviewing papers in 2004

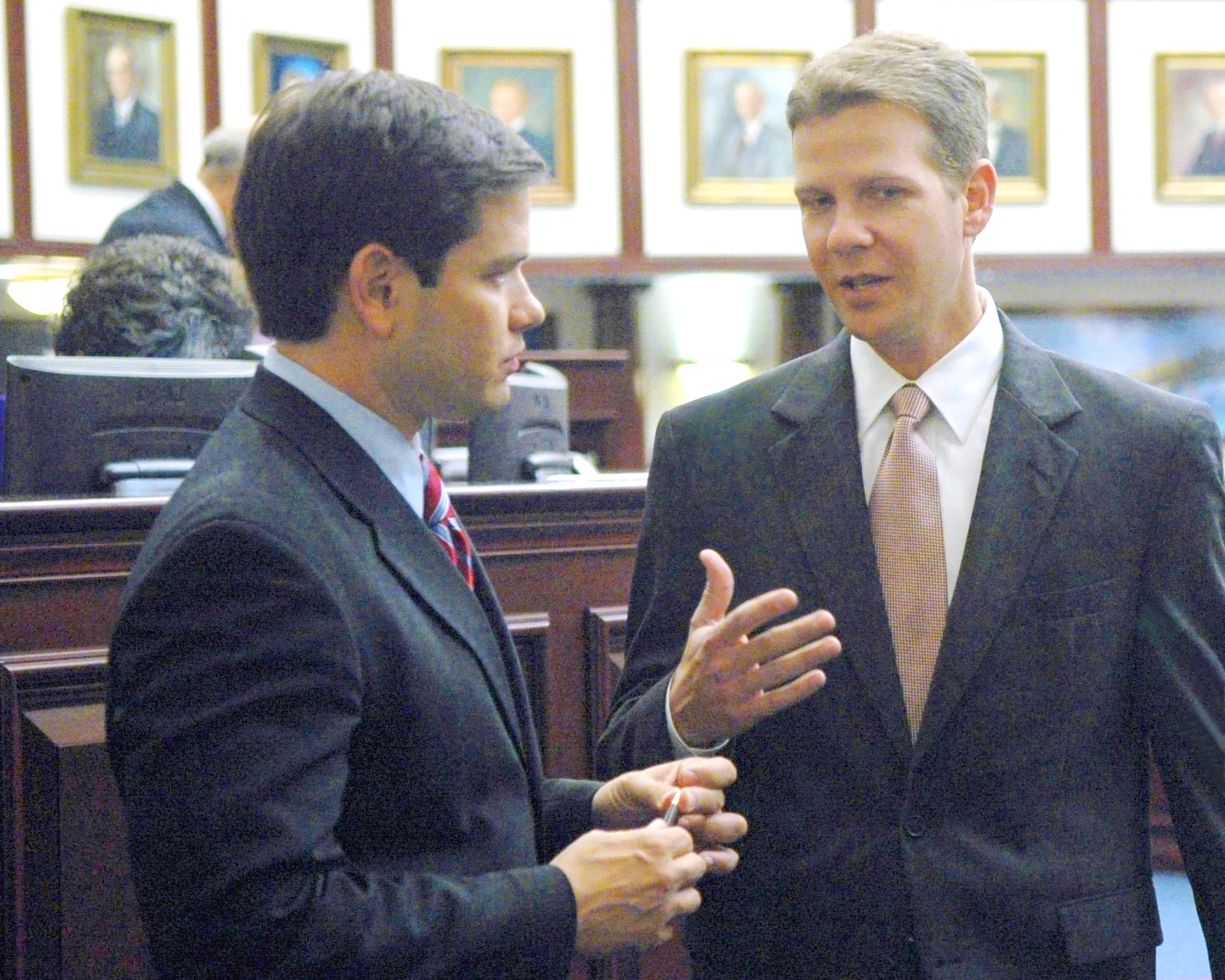
Marco Rubio and Andy Gardiner in 2006

In 2000, incumbent State Representative Bill Sublette was unable to seek re-election due to term limits. Gardiner ran to succeed him in the 40th District, which was based in western Orange County and included parts of downtown Orlando and Hunters Creek and Lake Buena Vista. He was opposed in the Republican primary by John Dowless, the former executive director of the Florida Christian Coalition; Geraldine Ferris, a dentist; and Michael Rudd, a surveyor and real-estate broker. The Orlando Sentinel endorsed Gardiner, praising his "depth of knowledge and experience" and stance on the issues. Gardiner ended up placing first in the primary, receiving 37% of the vote to Dowless's 29%, Ferris's 28%, and Rudd's 6%. However, because he did not receive a majority of the vote, a runoff election was held between Gardiner and Dowless. During the runoff campaign, Gardiner emphasized his "pro-business" ideology while Dowless won the support of the defeated primary candidates and thirty legislators, including Gardiner's former boss, Allen Trovillion. The Sentinel again endorsed Gardiner in the runoff, noting his "broader perspective" and ability "to see the big picture," while criticizing Dowless for lobbying for "an organization with a narrow, often-polarizing, perspective." Gardiner ended up defeating Dowless, winning 54% of the vote to Dowless's 46%, and advanced to the general election, where he faced Stuart Buchanan, the Democratic nominee and an attorney. In the general election, Gardiner campaigned on his support for expanding then-Governor Jeb Bush's school voucher plan, while Buchanan argued that the plan was anti-teacher. Ultimately, Gardiner defeated Buchanan to win his first term in the House, receiving 55% of the vote to Buchanan's 45%.

When Gardiner ran for re-election in 2002, he was opposed only by Jack Conway, a Libertarian candidate who supported the privatization of public education. Gardiner was endorsed for re-election by the Sentinel, which criticized Conway's platform as "outlandish" and praised Gardiner for showing "lots of promise during his first two-year term," specifically noting his efforts to pass legislation and his leadership positions. He handily won re-election, winning 77% of the vote to Conway's 23%.

Gardiner was re-elected without opposition in 2004. He ended his campaign to be Speaker of the Florida House of Representatives for the 2006-2008 legislative term, conceding to fellow State Representative Marco Rubio. Instead, he was appointed Majority Leader for the 2004-2006 legislative term by Speaker-designate Allan Bense.

In 2006, Gardiner was opposed for re-election by Darren Soto, an attorney and the Democratic nominee. Soto opposed Gardiner's re-election with the intent of tying up funds in Gardiner's race, to prevent the Republican Party of Florida from attacking Scott Randolph's ultimately successful campaign in an adjacent district. The Sentinel once again endorsed Gardiner, citing his "ability to build consensus and get things done," though they praised Soto as "an articulate attorney who has a future in public office." Gardiner ended up defeating Soto handily, winning his fourth and final term in the House with 63% of the vote to Soto's 37%.

== Florida Senate ==
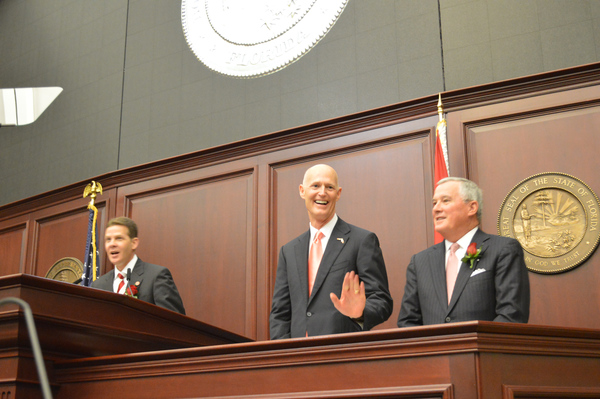
Gardiner introduces Governor Rick Scott at his State of the State address in 2015

In 2008, incumbent State Senator Daniel Webster was unable to seek re-election due to term limits. Gardiner ran to succeed him in the 9th District, which stretched from Lake Mary to Kissimmee, including parts of Osceola, Orange, and Seminole Counties. Gardiner won the Republican nomination uncontested and faced Darius Davis, a teacher and the Democratic nominee, in the general election. The Sentinel endorsed Gardiner, whom they singled out for being "one of the Legislature's strongest, and most effective, advocates for disabled children," over Davis, whom they criticized for having "a lot to learn." Gardiner won his first term in the legislature by a wide margin, winning 58% of the vote to Davis's 42%.

During the 2010-2012 legislative term, Gardiner served as Majority Leader of the Florida Senate. He pushed for legislation that would have waived the cost of drivers license for the poor, though it ultimately failed to pass, and called for the reform of the state's regional work-force training agencies. Gardiner stopped State Representative Mike Horner's effort to remove Orange County Mayor Teresa Jacobs from the Central Florida Expressway Authority after she pushed for ethics reform, which the Sentinel referred to as an example of the Senate stopping "House excesses."

Following the reconfiguration of the state's legislative districts in 2012, Gardiner opted to run for re-election in the 13th District, which contained almost none of the territory that he had previously represented in the Senate. Running for a second and final term, Gardiner was opposed by Christopher Pennington, an attorney and the Democratic nominee. Both candidates spoke on the need to improve economic development in northern Brevard County, which was hard-hit by the ending of the Space Shuttle program. Gardiner emphasized the need for experience in revitalizing the local economies, while Pennington called for "fresh ideas" and an emphasis on "energy opportunities," including small nuclear power facilities. Though the Sentinel praised Pennington as "well-intentioned," they endorsed Gardiner for a final term, noting that while he was "a staunch fiscal and social conservative, but not a shrill partisan like some other party leaders." Following his re-election, he worked with fellow State Senator Thad Altman to start dredging the Indian River Lagoon, which had been struck by massive algae blooms that killed wildlife and destroyed sea grass.

During the 2014-2016 legislative session, Gardiner serves as the President of the Florida Senate. However, in 2012, when Gardiner did not yet have the voters to be Senate President over fellow State Senator Jack Latvala, then-State Senator John E. Thrasher conspired to install himself as Senate President for the 2014–2016 term. Latvala joined with State Senators David Simmons and Rene Garcia to outmaneuver Thrasher, and elected Gardiner. In Gardiner's term as Senate President, he pushed for state funding to provide assistance to special needs students and for the proposed expansion by the University of Central Florida into downtown Orlando, which would have included "a statewide coordinating center for disabled students as well." Though both proposals were passed by the legislature, they were both ultimately vetoed by Governor Rick Scott, largely seen as pushback for Gardiner's unsuccessful efforts to expand Medicaid under the Affordable Care Act. Gardiner strongly condemned Governor Scott's veto of the funding for disabled students, saying, "[T]here are many families across Florida who have seen their dreams shattered by his decisions today," and noting, "It is unfortunate that the messaging strategy needed to achieve the Governor's political agenda comes at the expense of the most vulnerable people in our state."

== Gardiner and the 2nd Amendment ==
In 2015 and 2016, Gardiner was criticized by pro-gun interest groups for supporting Senate Judiciary Committee Chairman, Senator Miguel Diaz de La Portilla, in his decision not to agenda a carry on campus bill, effectively killing it. In February 2016, Gardiner again sided with Senator Diaz de la Portilla in his decision not to agenda an open carry bill citing respect for the legislative process and deference to the authority vested in Committee Chairs by the Senate President. Bekah Hargrove, state director for Florida Students for Concealed Carry stated "If this type of behavior is permitted to continue, the legislative system will be fundamentally changed forever. Senator Diaz de la Portilla represents exactly what is wrong in politics and the people must not let him continue to act as judge, jury, and executioner. Senate President Andy Gardiner is just as much to blame. Senator Gardiner has the power to ensure the campus carry bill gets a vote, but refuses to do anything and uses Senator Diaz de la Portilla as a scapegoat." Gardiner has received a 100% rating from the NRA Political Victory Fund for his past voting record.

Florida House of Representatives
Preceded by Bill Sublette	Member of the Florida House of Representatives from the 40th district 2000–2008	Succeeded by Eric Eisnaugle
Preceded by Marco Rubio	Majority Leader of the Florida House of Representatives; 2004–2006	Succeeded by Marsha Bowen
Florida Senate
Preceded by Daniel Webster	Member of the Florida Senate from the 9th district 2008–2012	Succeeded by Audrey Gibson
Preceded by Dennis Jones	Member of the Florida Senate from the 13th district 2012–2016	Succeeded by Linda Stewart
Preceded by Alex Díaz de la Portilla	Majority Leader of the Florida Senate; 2010–2012	Succeeded by Lizbeth Benacquisto
Political offices
Preceded by Don Gaetz	President of the Florida Senate; 2014–2016	Succeeded by Joe Negron
