= Dave Aronberg =

American politician

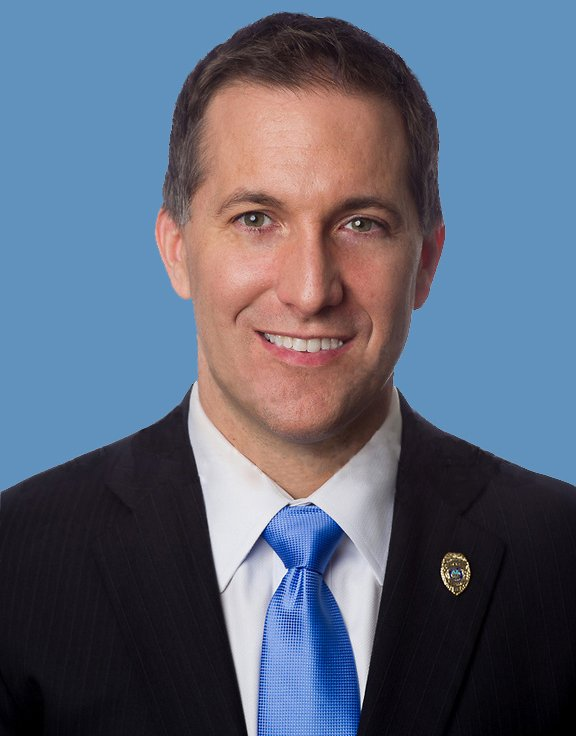

State Attorney for the Fifteenth Judicial Circuit Court of Florida
- In office January 8, 2013 – January 7, 2025
- Preceded by: Peter Antonacci
- Succeeded by: Alexcia Cox

Member of the Florida Senate from the 27th district
- In office November 5, 2002 – November 2, 2010
- Preceded by: Tom Rossin
- Succeeded by: Lizbeth Benacquisto

Personal details
- Born: May 4, 1971 (age 55) Miami, Florida
- Party: Democratic
- Spouse: Sasha Kraver
- Education: Harvard University (BA, JD)
- Profession: Attorney

Dave Aronberg (born May 4, 1971) is an American politician who served as state attorney of Palm Beach County, Florida from 2013 to 2025. A member of the Democratic Party, he previously served in the Florida Senate from 2002 to 2010 and as the Florida Attorney General's “Drug Czar” in 2012.

== Early life and career ==
Aronberg was born in Miami. He is of Jewish descent. He attended North Miami Senior High School, and graduated from Harvard College with a Bachelor of Arts degree with honors in Government in 1993. He then attended Harvard Law School, where he received a Juris Doctor degree with honors in 1996.

After graduation, Aronberg worked for three years in the litigation department of the law firm Steel Hector & Davis LLP, in Miami and West Palm Beach.

=== Holocaust victims insurance relief ===
Aronberg took a leave of absence from the law firm for three months in 1998 to work for U.S. Senator Bill Nelson, who at the time was serving as Florida's Insurance Commissioner. Nelson and Aronberg worked together to investigate European insurance companies that refused to honor World War II-era policies sold to victims of the Holocaust. Working with members of the National Association of Insurance Commissioners (NAIC), the investigation led to the establishment of the International Commission on Holocaust Era Insurance Claims (ICHEIC) and the enactment of Florida's Holocaust Victims Assistance Act to ensure that insurance claims of Holocaust victims were expeditiously identified and properly paid, compensated, or returned.

=== Florida Assistant Attorney General - Economic Crimes ===
Aronberg worked as an Assistant Attorney General in the Economic Crimes Division of the Florida Attorney General's Office on two separate occasions. In 2000, President Bill Clinton selected Aronberg to be a White House Fellow. After the Fellowship was completed in September 2001, Aronberg returned to the Economic Crimes Division.

==== Phone-scam psychic "Miss Cleo" and the Psychic Readers Network ====
Aronberg investigated late-night television celebrity, Youree Harris, a/k/a "Miss Cleo," and the Psychic Readers Network for deceptive marketing practices. As part of the investigation, Aronberg obtained and released to the public a copy of Harris' California birth certificate, even though she was promoted as a shaman from Jamaica. Working with Florida and other states, the Federal Trade Commission fined Psychic Readers Network $5 million and forced it to cancel $500 million in customer bills.

=== White House fellowship ===
In 2000, Aronberg was selected to be one of 15 White House Fellows from across the country. In this non-partisan position, he served in two presidential administrations as a Special Assistant to the Secretary of the Treasury Department for international money laundering, including the laundering of terrorist assets.

He was part of a U.S. delegation to an international summit on money laundering at an Asia-Pacific Economic Cooperation (APEC) conference in Kuala Lumpur, Malaysia in 2001.

== Florida Senate ==
Aronberg was elected to the Florida Senate in 2002 as its youngest member. He served as the Chair of the Military Affairs and Domestic Security Committee, and also chaired the Everglades Restoration Committee, where he advocated for additional state and federal funds to protect and restore the “River of Grass.”

=== Domestic security ===
As Chairman of the Florida Senate’s Military Affairs and Domestic Security Committee, Aronberg led a rewrite of Florida's port security law to better protect Floridians from terrorist threats. Aronberg’s 2009 bill, signed into law by Florida Governor Charlie Crist at a bill signing ceremony at Fort Lauderdale’s Port Everglades, matched Florida security law to the federal requirements. The bill received unanimous support from labor unions and maritime businesses, leading the Associated Industries of Florida’s Maritime Council to name Aronberg as “Legislator of the Year” for his work to improve port security while expanding Florida's global position as a leading exporter.

=== Public safety and criminal justice ===
==== Opioid abuse ====
When Aronberg was elected to the Florida Senate in 2002, he followed up on his investigation of Purdue Pharma by calling attention to the growing opioid crisis. In 2010, the Florida legislature enacted legislation co-sponsored by Aronberg to regulate the pain clinic industry and to limit the dispensing of narcotics such as oxycodone.

==== Anti-looting ====
In 2007, he was successful in passing an anti-looting law that increased penalties for specific thefts and burglaries committed after the Governor has declared a state of emergency.

==== Gang violence ====
During 2007 and 2008, Aronberg pushed the Legislature to pass tough anti-gang legislation. The language in Aronberg's proposal, which was enacted into law in 2008, increased penalties for habitual offenders convicted of gang-related crimes and stiffened sanctions for witness tampering and harassment. The legislation also banned gang members from possessing bulletproof vests during the commission of a crime.

==== Sexual violence ====
Aronberg sponsored a bill to eliminate the statute of limitations for child victims of sexual abuse. His bill, SB 870, passed both the House and Senate unanimously and was signed into law by Governor Crist. The Florida Coalition Against Sexual Violence named Aronberg its “Legislator of Year” of 2010.

=== Consumer protection and privacy rights ===
==== Regulating the credit counseling industry ====
In 2004, Aronberg sponsored Florida's Credit Counseling Services Bill (SB 2682), which limited the fees credit counseling and debt repair companies could charge consumers.

==== Video voyeurism ====
In 2004, Aronberg proposed a bill to make video voyeurism a crime in Florida, which included the taking as well as the dissemination of the images.

== Florida Attorney General candidacy ==
In 2010, Aronberg made a bid for the office of Attorney General of Florida. Aronberg was unsuccessful in the primary.

== Special Prosecutor for Prescription Drug Trafficking ("Drug Czar") ==
In early 2011, based on Aronberg's work on opioid abuse, Florida Attorney General Pam Bondi reached across party lines to appoint Aronberg to be Special Prosecutor for Prescription Drug Trafficking, or "Drug Czar."

== Palm Beach County State Attorney ==
In January 2012, Aronberg announced his candidacy for Palm Beach County State Attorney. Aronberg won the office with 58% of the vote in the November 6, 2012 election and was re-elected without opposition on May 6, 2016.

As State Attorney, Aronberg lead a team of 120 prosecutors and 220 professional staff in five offices throughout Palm Beach County.

In 2016, Aronberg was elected as an officer of the National District Attorneys Association (NDAA) and subsequently re-elected in 2017. He led an NDAA working group that published a national report to advise prosecutors and legislators of best practices in addressing the opioid epidemic. In November 2016, Aronberg traveled to Guantanamo Bay Naval Base as a representative of the NDAA to observe the prosecution of accused Al-Qaida terrorist Abdul al Hadi al Iraqi. In 2016, Florida Bar President Bill Schifino appointed Aronberg to the Florida Bar Board of Governors to represent government lawyers throughout the State. Aronberg was reappointed to two more terms by Florida Bar Presidents Michael Higher and Michelle Suskauer, respectively.

=== Task forces ===
In early 2016, Aronberg launched a task force to protect seniors from scams.

==== Sober Homes Task Force ====
Aronberg's most notable task force is his Sober Homes Task Force, which has helped to clean up the fraud and abuse in the drug recovery industry in Palm Beach County, also known as "The Florida Shuffle." Since October 2016, the Task Force has made more than 85 arrests for patient brokering and insurance fraud, and has led to new Florida laws and regulations that have become the model for other states. Aronberg's efforts also convinced Google to restrict advertisements and improve screening for addiction treatment. The crackdown in rogue sober homes and corrupted drug treatment led to an approximate 40% decrease in opioid overdose deaths in Palm Beach County in 2018, compared to 2017. Aronberg's Task Force has received national attention for its work to combat the opioid epidemic, including a feature story on Sunday Night with Megyn Kelly on June 25, 2017, and a 60 Minutes interview on September 30, 2018. After testifying twice before Congress about federal laws that unwittingly incentive drug relapse over recovery, Aronberg launched a website to urge policymakers to "fix the Florida Shuffle."

==== Human Trafficking Task Force ====
In 2017, Aronberg formed a Human Trafficking Task Force with the Palm Beach County Sheriff's Office and federal officials. The Florida Attorney General appointed Aronberg to the Statewide Council on Human Trafficking to represent all state prosecutors.

=== Animal welfare ===
Aronberg, who adopted his basset hound, Cookie, from Big Dog Ranch Rescue in 2011, personally prosecuted a felony animal cruelty case for his first trial as State Attorney.

In recognition of his efforts to fight animal cruelty, Aronberg received the national Wings Award by the Pegasus Foundation for his contributions to animal welfare.

=== First-time DUI offender program ===
In 2013, Aronberg launched a first-time DUI offender program, the only one to have been endorsed by Mothers Against Drunk Driving (MADD). It has been used by thousands of defendants and has had a low reoffending rate.

The most well-known defendant to enter Aronberg's program was golfer Tiger Woods, whose 2017 DUI case made international news.

=== Corey Lewandowski case ===
Aronberg gained national media attention during the 2016 Presidential Election when he announced he would not move forward with a battery charge against Corey Lewandowski, Donald Trump's campaign manager. Jupiter Police had charged Lewandowski with misdemeanor battery after former Breitbart reporter Michelle Fields alleged that he grabbed her after a Trump press conference on March 8 at Trump International Golf Club.

=== Nouman Raja case ===
As State Attorney, Aronberg filed charges of manslaughter by culpable negligence and attempted first-degree murder with a firearm against Palm Beach Gardens police officer Nouman Raja for the killing of 31-year-old musician and housing inspector, Corey Jones, a black man who had been waiting for help on a highway after his car broke down. On March 7, 2019, a jury found Raja guilty as charged, making him the first officer in Florida to be convicted of an on-duty shooting in 30 years. Circuit Court Judge Joseph Marx sentenced Raja to 25 years in prison.

== Morning Joe and MeidasTouch ==
Aronberg has become a weekly guest on MS NOW's Morning Joe to discuss legal issues, particularly those related to the criminal justice system.

Aronberg is also a contributor on YouTube's MeidasTouch, discussing some of the toughest and most controversial legal issues.

== Personal life ==
In May 2015, Aronberg married Lynn Lewis, a former Miami Dolphins Cheerleader and public relations professional at the Don Cesar in St. Pete Beach; she is a convert to Judaism. They divorced in August 2017.

In May 2024, Aronberg married Sasha Kraver in a small ceremony at the Brazilian Court Hotel in Palm Beach, FL. Kraver is a luxury realtor with Douglas Elliman in Palm Beach.
