= Jeff Clemens =

American politician (born 1970)

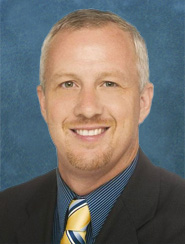

Member of the Florida Senate
- In office November 6, 2012 – October 27, 2017
- Preceded by: Lizbeth Benacquisto
- Succeeded by: Lori Berman
- Constituency: 27th district (2012–2016); 31st district (2016–2017)

Member of the Florida House of Representatives from the 89th district
- In office November 2, 2010 – November 6, 2012
- Preceded by: Mary Brandenburg
- Succeeded by: Bill Hager

Personal details
- Born: September 8, 1970 (age 55) Detroit, Michigan
- Party: Democratic
- Education: Michigan State University (B.A.)

Jeff Clemens (born September 8, 1970, in Detroit, Michigan) is a Democratic politician from Florida. He represented parts of Palm Beach County in the Florida Senate from 2012 until 2017. He previously served one term in the Florida House of Representatives, representing the 89th district from 2010 to 2012.

== History ==
Clemens was born in Detroit, Michigan, and attended Michigan State University, from which he graduated in 1992 with a degree in journalism. He moved to Florida in 1997 and worked as a planner for the Florida Institute of Public Health, a reporter for the Naples Daily News, an aide to State Representative Mary Brandenburg, and as the Chairman of the Lake Worth Community Redevelopment Agency.

In 2007, Clemens ran for Mayor of Lake Worth, challenging incumbent Mayor Marc Drautz in a crowded field that included Mary Lindsey, John Jordan, William D. Coakley, and Andrew Procyk. He won 48% of the vote to Drautz's 41% in the election on March 13, but because he did not win a majority, he had to run against Drautz in a runoff election held on March 27. Clemens campaigned as the most experienced candidate and condemned the negative advertisements against him funded by "outside interests," noting, "Usually an incumbent spends his time talking about the positive things he has accomplished, but in the absence of accomplishments the only recourse is to use negative attacks." Ultimately, Clemens narrowly defeated Drautz by 149 votes, winning 52% of the vote to Drautz's 48%.

Clemens spent his time as Mayor rebuilding city parks, helping to bring a Publix to downtown, and starting the city's beachfront rebuild. He was also a main proponent of moving the area's LGBTQ support group, Compass, and its headquarters to Lake Worth, pushing the City Commission to lease a building in a close 3-2 vote. He did not run for re-election, instead deciding to run for a vacant Florida House of Representatives seat.

== Florida House of Representatives ==
In 2010, following the inability of incumbent State Representative Bradenburg to seek re-election, Clemens ran to succeed her in the 89th District, which stretched from Greenacres to West Palm Beach and Hypoluxo in eastern Palm Beach County. In the Democratic primary, he defeated Brandenburg's husband, Peter Brandenburg, winning 60% of the vote. Advancing to the general election, Clemens faced Steven Rosenblum, the Republican nominee and a former pharmacy manager. He campaigned on his support for increasing funding for education, declaring that the state's low level of spending per student is a "source of embarrassment for every Floridian," and on opposition to offshore drilling, noting, "It's not just an environmental issue. It's an economic one. Florida's economy is largely based on tourism." Ultimately, Clemens defeated Rosenblum in a landslide, winning his first term in the legislature with 60% of the vote.

While in the House, Clemens filed the first-ever Florida bill seeking to legalize medical marijuana. While the bill did not receive a hearing, it began a larger discussion that culminated in the passing of a constitutional amendment (Amendment 2, 2016) legalizing medical marijuana in 2016. He also sponsored a bill that would expand the possible locations for early voting to various government buildings and university campuses.

== Florida Senate ==
Following the reconfiguration of Florida Senate districts in 2012, Clemens was drawn into the 27th District. In the Democratic primary, he faced fellow State Representative Mack Bernard. Clemens won the endorsement of labor unions AFL-CIO and SEIU, while Bernard received the endorsement of the Florida Chamber of Commerce. In the end, Clemens was able to narrowly defeat Bernard by only seventeen votes in the primary election. Bernard held out hope, however, that Clemens's victory would be overturned and filed a lawsuit to have forty absentee ballots counted. A judge in Tallahassee ruled against Bernard but allowed nine provisional ballots to be counted, which would not have been enough to allow Bernard to emerge victorious In the general election, Clemens remained on the ballot as the Democratic nominee, and was elected unopposed.

During the 2014 legislative session, Clemens introduced legislation that "regulates the cultivation, manufacturing, distribution, prescribing, and retail sale of marijuana for medical purposes," a version of which he introduced in every legislative sessionhes was a part of since he was elected to the legislature. Additionally, he worked with Republican State Senator Jeff Brandes to co-author and pass legislation that would allow the Florida Department of Transportation to raise the speed limit to 75 miles per hour on certain state highways, though Governor Rick Scott vetoed the legislation following opposition from law enforcement officials and the American Automobile Association. Clemens was also the sponsor of the Competitive Workforce Act, which would have banned discrimination in hiring and firing for members of the LGBTQ community.

Clemens' district was reconfigured and renumbered after court-ordered redistricting in 2016. The redrawn district encompassed Lake Worth, Boynton Beach, Delray Beach, Lantana, Lake Clarke Shores, and Greenacres.

== Resignation ==
On October 27, 2017, Clemens resigned from the Senate after admitting to an extramarital affair with a Martin County employee registered to lobby the state on the small county's behalf. The affair became public a day before.
