= Lee Constantine =

American politician

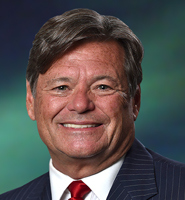
- Official portrait, 2025

Member of the Seminole County Commission from the 3rd district
- Incumbent
- Assumed office November 27, 2012
- Preceded by: Dick Van Der Weide

Member of the Florida Senate
- In office November 7, 2000 – November 2, 2010
- Preceded by: Toni Jennings
- Succeeded by: David Simmons
- Constituency: 9th District (2000–2002); 22nd District (2002–2010)

Member of the Florida House of Representatives from the 37th district
- In office November 3, 1992 – November 7, 2000
- Preceded by: Tom Feeney
- Succeeded by: David Simmons

Personal details
- Born: November 6, 1952 (age 74) Wilmington, Delaware, U.S.
- Party: Republican
- Education: University of Central Florida (BA)
- Criminal information
- Criminal information
- Status: Released
- Conviction: Driving under the influence (x2)

Lee Constantine (born November 6, 1952) is an American politician and real estate broker. He served as a Republican member of the Florida Senate from 2000 to 2010, and of the Florida House of Representatives from 1992 through 2000, representing Orange and Seminole counties.

Constantine moved to Florida in 1958 and was raised in Altamonte Springs. He earned a Bachelor of Arts in Communications from the then-Florida Technological University, now known as the University of Central Florida, in 1974. At FTU, he was active in the Student Government Association, serving successively as a student senator, student body vice president, and student body president.

In 1978, Constantine was elected to the Altamonte Springs City Commission, the youngest person to serve on the Commission in its history. He served on the City Commission for 14 years, and in 1981, served as Mayor. In 1992, he was elected to the Florida House of Representatives, and was re-elected three times without opposition, before defeating local businessman Ron Ellman for a seat in the Florida State Senate in 2000. Constantine was re-elected without opposition in 2004, and defeated attorney Jeremiah Jaspon to win re-election in 2006. Senator Constantine could not seek re-election in 2010 due to term limits.

In 2012, Constantine challenged incumbent Seminole County Commissioner Dick Van Der Weide in the Republican primary, and was endorsed by the Orlando Sentinel as a legislator with a reputation for "working hard, building consensus, and getting results." Constantine ultimately defeated Van Der Weide and two other candidates in a close and hotly contested election. In the general election, he faced only a write-in candidate and received 93% of the vote.

== Controversy ==
Constantine was arrested on a drunken driving charge in 2004, his second arrest for drunk driving. In 2007 someone using a computer owned by the Florida Legislature removed the entry about Constantine being arrested for DUI from his Wikipedia page, and when asked about the incident Constantine stated, "I don't even know what Wikipedia is, I'm surprised I can even pronounce it."

In November, 2015, WFTV (local channel 9) investigated Commissioner Constantine due to numerous allegations of a hostile work environment. The online report from that station includes the following: "...in the three years Seminole County Commissioner Lee Constantine has been in office, three of his aides have quit or asked to be reassigned to another office. In each case they had the same complaints. Soul-crushing, demeaning, unfair, inconsistent and rude were all terms used by former aides to Constantine."
