= Maria Sachs =

American politician

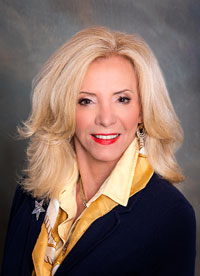

Member of the Palm Beach County Commission from the 5th district
- Incumbent
- Assumed office November 20, 2020
- Preceded by: Mary Lou Berger

Member of the Florida Senate
- In office November 2, 2010 – November 8, 2016
- Preceded by: Ted Deutch
- Succeeded by: Gary Farmer (redistricted)
- Constituency: 30th district (2010—2012); 34th district (2012—2016)

Member of the Florida House of Representatives from the 86th district
- In office November 7, 2006 – November 2, 2010
- Preceded by: Anne Gannon
- Succeeded by: Lori Berman

Personal details
- Born: March 25, 1949 (age 77) Battle Creek, Michigan, U.S.
- Party: Democratic
- Spouse: Peter Sachs
- Children: 3
- Education: University of Maryland (BA); Boston University (MA); University of Miami (JD)
- Profession: Attorney

Maria Sachs (born March 25, 1949) is an American attorney and politician serving as a member of the Palm Beach County Board of County Commissioners for District 5 since 2020. She previously served in both the Florida House of Representatives and the Florida Senate.

== Early life and career ==
Sachs was born in Battle Creek, Michigan and attended the University of Maryland, where she received her bachelor's degree, Boston University, where she received her master's degree, and, after she moved to Florida in 1976, the University of Miami, where she received her Juris Doctor. Following her graduation from law school, she worked as an assistant state attorney in the narcotics division in Miami-Dade County and in Broward County before working for Sachs and Sax, a civil law firm. In 1994, Sachs ran for the Group 25 judicial position on the Fifteenth Judicial Circuit Court of Florida, facing incumbent Judge Catherine M. Brunson, Curtis Levine, John Marinelli, and Brian Kimber. In the nonpartisan primary, Sachs received 21% of the vote and placed second to Brunson, who received 33%. Because Brunson did not win a majority, a runoff election was held. Sachs lost to Brunson, receiving 44% of the vote to Brunson's 56%.

== Florida House of Representatives ==
When incumbent State Representative Anne Gannon opted to run for Palm Beach County Tax Collector rather than seek re-election in 2006, Sachs ran to succeed her in the 86th District, which stretched from Boca Raton to Boynton Beach in Palm Beach County. She faced Joseph Abruzzo, former New York State Assemblyman Mark Alan Siegel, and former Maine State Representative Harriet Lerman in the Democratic primary. Sachs received 34% of the vote to Abruzzo's 26%, Siegel's 21%, and Lerman's 19%, and advanced to the general election, where she was unopposed. Running for re-election in 2008, Sachs was opposed by independent candidate John Sottilare. She was endorsed for re-election by the Sun-Sentinel, which called her a "promising" legislator who "has taken a smart approach to her job in Tallahassee" by passing good legislation. Sachs won with 82% of the vote.

== Florida Senate ==
When State Senator Ted Deutch was elected to Congress in a special election held in 2010, Sachs ran to succeed him in the 30th District, which included Boca Raton, Boynton Beach, Deerfield Beach, and Wellington in eastern Palm Beach County and northeastern Broward County. She was unopposed in both the Democratic primary and the general election and won her first term uncontested.

In 2012, when the state's legislative districts were redrawn in 2012, Sachs was moved into the 34th District, which contained much of the territory that she had previously represented. She faced fellow State Senator Ellyn Setnor Bogdanoff in the general election, and both the Florida Democratic Party and the Republican Party of Florida invested heavily in the race. Sachs was attacked in a television advertisement for allegedly billing limousine rides to taxpayers, a claim that Sachs disputed. Bogdanoff raised more than a million dollars for her campaign, while Sachs raised about half of Bogdanoff's total. The Palm Beach Post endorsed Sachs over Bogdanoff, stating that her election could "head off reckless legislation the too-powerful Republican majority has been eager to pass" and stating that, in a number of instances, "Sachs cast a better vote." The Sun-Sentinel wrote that "either woman could do a credible job representing the district" and endorsed Bogdanoff, citing her ability to work with Republican leadership. Sachs won with 53% of the vote to Bogdanoff's 47%.

When Sachs ran for re-election in 2014, Bogdanoff challenged her in a rematch that would ultimately determine whether Republicans would win a supermajority in the State Senate or not. Sachs campaigned on her support for enhanced texting-while-driving laws and public education, while Bogdanoff expressed her support for prison reform and charter schools. Unlike two years prior, the Republican Party did not advertise on Bogdanoff's behalf, and though Bogdanoff outraised Sachs once again, it was by a considerably smaller advantage than two years prior. Sachs was attacked by groups supporting Bogdanoff for the fact that she owned a large home outside the district, though she stated that she lives within the district full-time. The Sun-Sentinel, which had endorsed Bogdanoff in 2012, endorsed Sachs in their rematch, stating that she was a "capable legislator in a body dominated by Republicans," and that voters "have no need to make a change." Sachs defeated Bogdanoff, 52 to 48%.

After court-ordered redistricting again redrew her senate district, Sachs decided not to seek reelection in 2016. She was hired as the executive director of Innovation Florida, a nonprofit advocacy organization that she helped found.

== Local government ==
Sachs was elected in 2020 to the Palm Beach County Board of County Commissioners for District 5, taking office on November 20, 2020. She also served as Mayor of the Commission. During her tenure as Mayor, she championed economic development initiatives, including efforts to attract higher education institutions and expand the region’s innovation economy. She was involved in discussions and regional efforts to bring Vanderbilt University to establish a graduate campus in West Palm Beach, part of a broader initiative to strengthen workforce development and position Palm Beach County as a hub for finance, technology, and business innovation.

== Civic and nonprofit involvement ==
Sachs is the founder and past president of Women for Excellence, Inc., and founding president of the Broward County chapter of the Florida Association for Women Lawyers. She has served on advisory boards including Northwood University and the Palm Beach County Juvenile Detention Center, and has been involved with organizations such as Kids in Distress and World Centers of Compassion for Children International.

== Honors and recognition ==
Sachs received the title Cavaliere dell'Ordine della Stella d'Italia from the President of Italy in recognition of cultural exchange contributions. She has also received honors including the Distinguished Humanitarian Award from B’nai B’rith and recognition from Women for Excellence.

== Personal life ==
Sachs resides in Palm Beach County, Florida, with her husband, attorney Peter Sachs. She has lived in the Agricultural Reserve for over 40 years, where she raised her five children. She currently resides with her husband, daughter, son-in-law, and three grandchildren.

Florida House of Representatives
Preceded by Anne Gannon	Member of the Florida House of Representatives from the 86th district 2006–2010	Succeeded by Lori Berman
Florida Senate
Preceded by Ted Deutch	Member of the Florida Senate from the 30th district 2010–2012	Succeeded by Lizbeth Benacquisto
Preceded by Nan Rich	Member of the Florida Senate from the 34th district 2012–2016	Succeeded by Gary Farmer
Political offices
Preceded by Mary Lou Berger	Member of the Palm Beach County Commission from the 5th district 2020–present	Incumbent
