= Florida's 27th Senate district =

American legislative district

Florida's 27th State Senate district
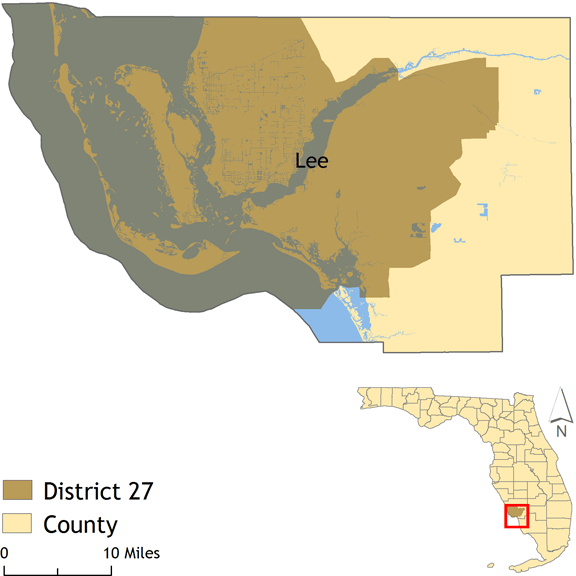
Senator
Ben Albritton; R–Wauchula
- Demographics: 82.9% White; 8.6% Black; 16.3% Hispanic; 1.5% Asian.3% Native American.1% Hawaiian/Pacific Islander; 4.6% Other
- Population (2010) • Voting age: 474,201; 381,954

Florida's 27th Senate district elects one member of the Florida Senate. The district comprises portions of Lee County. Its current senator is Republican Ben Albritton.

== Senators ==
- W. J. Turner, 1865-1866
- F. B. Hogan, 1879
- A. A. Robinson, 1881
- M. G. Fortner, 1883
- J. W. Whiddon, 1885-1887, 1893-1895, 1901–1903
- Ziba King, 1889-1891
- W. H. Fuller, 1897-1899
- Joseph H. Humphries, 1905-1912
- Frank M. Cooper, 1913-1915, 1921
- A. M. Wilson, 1917
- A. W. Wilson, 1918-1919
- E. J. Etheredge, 1923-1927
- W. D. Bell, 1929-1931
- H. G. Murphy, 1933-1939
- William Cliett, 1941-1943
- Wilbur C. King, 1945
- Jeff Flake, 1947
- (Not represented, 1948 ex)
- James W. Moore, 1949-1951
- Doyle E. Carlton Jr., 1953-1959, 1965
- G. W. (Dick) Williams, 1961-1963
- Ben Hill Griffin Jr., 1967 (D)
- Alan Trask, 1969-1971 (D)
- Philip D. Lewis, 1973-1981 (D)
- Tom Lewis, 1982 (R)
- William G. "Doc" Myers, 1983-2000 (R)
- Ken Pruitt, 2001-2002 (R)
- Dave Aronberg, 2003-2010 (D)
- Lizbeth Benacquisto, 2011-2012 (R)
- Jeff Clemens, 2013-2016 (D)
- Lizbeth Benacquisto, 2017-2020 (R)
- Ray Rodrigues, 2020–2022 (R)
- Ben Albritton, 2022-present(R)
