= Florida's 12th Senate district =

American legislative district in Florida

Florida's 12th State Senate district
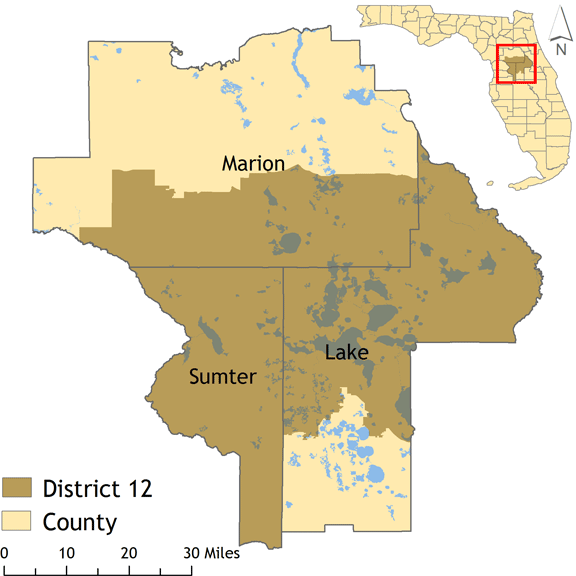
- Map boundaries until 2022
Senator
Colleen Burton; R–Lakeland

Florida's 12th Senate district elects one member to the Florida State Senate. Since 2022, it contains parts of Polk County.

Until 2022, it contained parts of Lake, Marion and Sumter counties.

== Members ==
Portrait	Name	Party	Years of service	Home city	Notes
	Geraldine Thompson	Democratic	2012–2016		
	Dennis Baxley	Republican	2016–2022		
	Colleen Burton	Republican	2022–present	Lakeland	
