= Florida's 32nd Senate district =

American legislative district

Florida's 32nd State Senate district
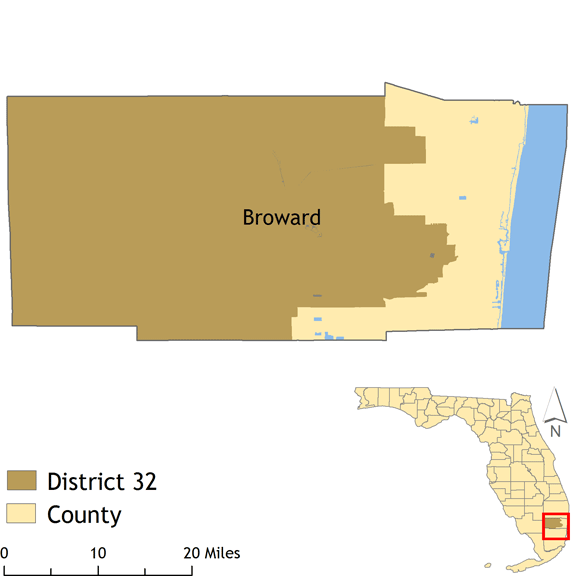
Senator
Rosalind Osgood; D–Fort Lauderdale

Florida's 32nd Senate district elects one member to the Florida State Senate. It contains parts of Broward County.

== Members ==
- Rosalind Osgood (since 2022)
