= Florida's 34th Senate district =

American legislative district

Florida's 34th State Senate district
- District boundaries, 2022–2032
Senator
Ashley Gantt; D
- Demographics: 11% White; 48% Black; 37% Hispanic; 1% Asian; 0% Native American; 1% Other

Florida's 34th Senate district elects one member to the Florida State Senate. It contains parts of Broward County.

== Members ==
- Sherman Winn (1972–1981)
- Joe Gersten (1982–1986)
- Ileana Ros-Lehtinen (1986–1989)
- Lincoln Díaz-Balart (1989–1992)
- Alberto Gutman (1992–1999)
- Alex Díaz de la Portilla (2000–2002)
- Maria Sachs (2012–2016)
- Gary Farmer (2016–2022)
- Shevrin Jones (2020–2026)
- Ashley Gantt (2026–present)
