= Lizbeth Benacquisto =

American politician (born 1967)

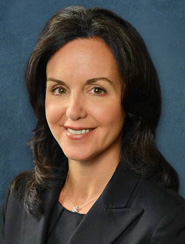
- Official portrait of Benacquisto

Member of the Florida Senate
- In office November 2, 2010 – November 3, 2020
- Preceded by: Dave Aronberg
- Succeeded by: Ray Rodrigues
- Constituency: 27th district (2010–2012); 30th district (2012–2016); 27th district (2016–2020)

Majority Leader of the Florida Senate
- In office November 2012 – November 2014
- Preceded by: Andy Gardiner
- Succeeded by: Bill Galvano

Personal details
- Born: December 23, 1967 (age 58) Rockville Centre, New York, U.S.
- Party: Republican
- Spouse(s): Unknown Spouse (?-?); Bruce Strayhorn (2011-2015)
- Education: Palm Beach Atlantic University (BA)
- Profession: Realtor

Lizbeth Benacquisto (born December 23, 1967) is an American politician who served as a member of the Florida Senate from 2010 to 2020. A member of the Republican Party, she was a candidate in the 2014 special election for Florida's 19th congressional district.

== History ==
Benacquisto was born in Rockville Centre, New York, in 1967 and moved to Florida in 1978, where she attended Palm Beach Atlantic University and worked as a realtor and marketing consultant. She served as a Wellington Village Councilwoman from 2002 to 2010.

== Florida Senate ==
In 2010, incumbent Democratic State Senator Dave Aronberg opted against seeking another term in the state senate, instead choosing to run for Attorney General of Florida. Benacquisto ran to succeed him, and narrowly defeated State Representative Sharon Merchant and Mike Lameyer in the Republican primary. In the general election, Benacquisto faced off against Kevin J. Rader, a state representative and the Democratic nominee. The district spanned from West Palm Beach on the Gold Coast to Cape Coral on the Sun Coast. Rader accused Benacquisto of committing 105 election law violations in a television advertisement, a claim which Politifact rated as a true statement. Benacquisto was further attacked for opposing a woman's right to choose, in cases of "rape, incest, even to save a woman's life," which Benacquisto responded to by noting that she had been raped years earlier and that Rader "crossed the line" with his advertisement. The Rader campaign, however, stood by the advertisement. In the end, following a toughly-fought campaign, Benacquisto defeated her opponent by a surprisingly wide margin, winning 54% of the vote to pick up the seat for the Republican Party.

When Florida Senate districts were reconfigured in 2012, Benacquisto ran for re-election in the 30th District. It included most of the old 27th, but not her home in Wellington, which had been drawn out of the district along with the rest of the old 27th's share of Palm Beach County. She moved to Fort Myers in the new 30th District, won her party's nomination unopposed, and faced off against Democratic nominee Debbie Jordan in the general election. The Naples Daily News endorsed Benacquisto for re-election, praising her for the fact that she "sponsored the Andrew Widman Act to better track dangerous criminals and the Silver Alert Program to protect seniors astray." In the end, she was overwhelmingly re-elected, receiving 62% of the vote.

While serving in the Senate, Benacquisto voted for the controversial "parent trigger" legislation that would allow parents to turn failing public schools into charter schools, but, ultimately, the bill did not pass. She also supported legislation that would exempt "certain manufacturing equipment from the state's sales tax," so as to potentially allow manufacturing companies to expand operations within the state. Following the controversy regarding the Westboro Baptist Church's decision to protest certain funerals, Benacquisto sponsored legislation that would make it a crime "to protest within 500 feet of a funeral," noting, "We've seen these types of protests occur all across the country and it is very disappointing that folks would use the moment of grief to make a political statement. So we wanted to make a strong stand here in Florida and let everyone know that we were going to protect the time of burial and the time of grieving and the time for goodbye." Benacquisto was elected the Majority Leader of the Florida State Senate for the 2012-2014 legislative session. Recently, following the resignation of Lieutenant Governor of Florida Jennifer Carroll, she has been floated as a potential replacement.

Benacquisto's district was reconfigured and renumbered after court-ordered redistricting in 2016. She was term-limited from office in 2020.

== Congressional campaign ==
On February 3, 2014, Benacquisto announced her candidacy for the United States Congress in the 19th District of Florida. Benacquisto was endorsed by former Governor of Alaska Sarah Palin in March 2014. She did not win the primary.

Florida Senate
Preceded by Dave Aronberg	Member of the Florida Senate from the 27th district 2010–2012	Succeeded by Jeff Clemens
Preceded by Maria Sachs	Member of the Florida Senate from the 30th district 2012–2016	Succeeded by Bobby Powell
Preceded by Jeff Clemens	Member of the Florida Senate from the 27th district 2016–2020	Succeeded by Ray Rodrigues
Preceded by Andy Gardiner	Majority Leader of the Florida Senate; 2012–2014	Succeeded by Bill Galvano
