= Florida's 30th Senate district =

American legislative district

Florida's 30th State Senate district
Senator
Lauren Book; D

Florida's 30th Senate district elects one member to the Florida State Senate. It contains parts of Broward County and Palm Beach County.

== Geography ==
Year	Location	Map
2016	Parts of Palm Beach County	
2024	Parts of Broward County and Palm Beach County	

== Members ==
- Lizbeth Benacquisto (2012–2016)
- Bobby Powell (2016–2022)
- Tina Polsky (since 2022)
