= David Simmons (Florida politician) =

American politician

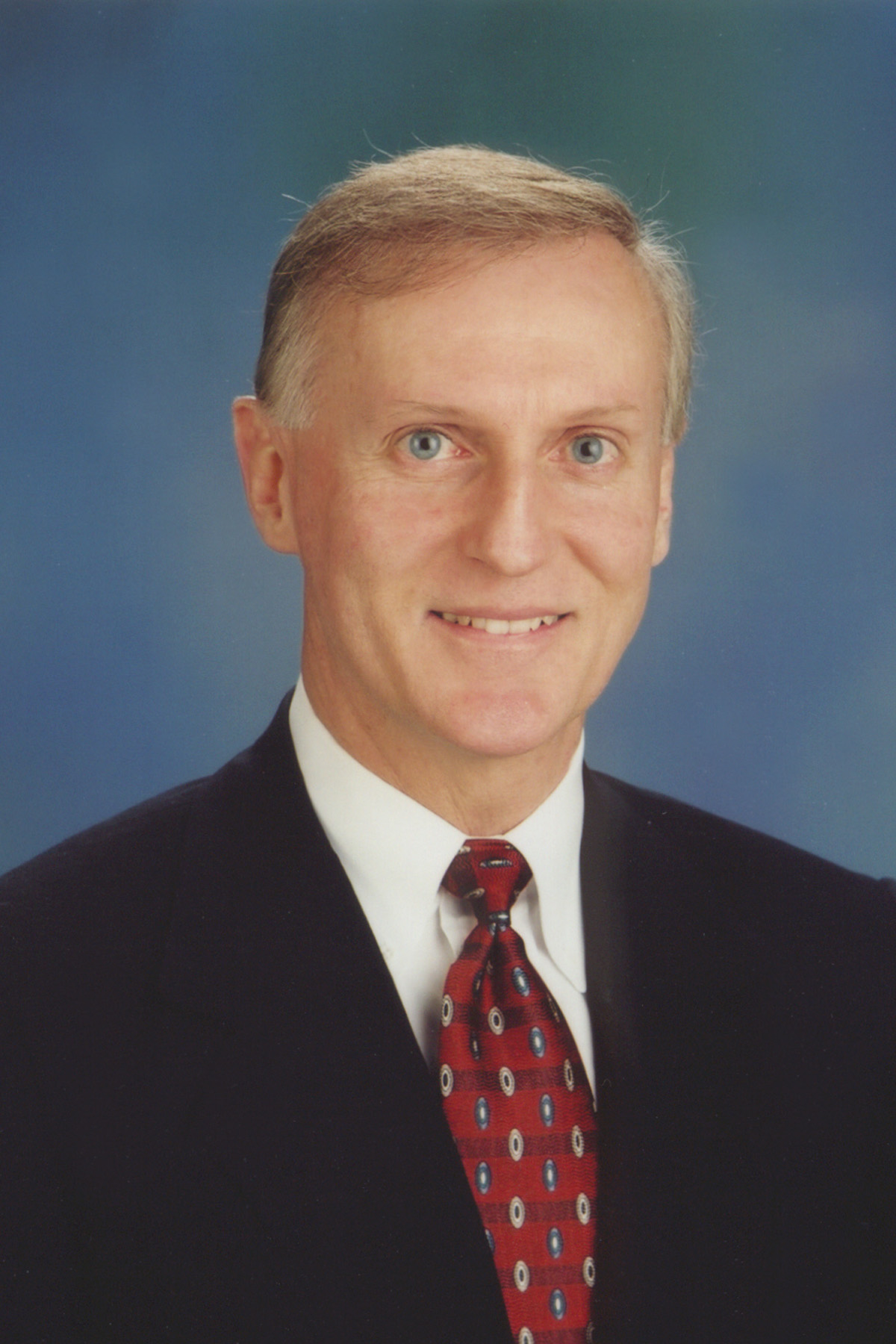
- Official portrait, 2007

President pro tempore of the Florida Senate
- In office November 20, 2018 – November 17, 2020
- Preceded by: Anitere Flores
- Succeeded by: Aaron Bean

Member of the Florida Senate
- In office November 2, 2010 – November 3, 2020
- Preceded by: Lee Constantine
- Succeeded by: Jason Brodeur
- Constituency: 22nd district (2010–2012); 10th district (2012–2016); 9th district (2016–2020)

Member of the Florida House of Representatives from the 37th district
- In office November 7, 2000 – November 4, 2008
- Preceded by: Lee Constantine
- Succeeded by: Scott Plakon

Personal details
- Born: June 13, 1952 (age 74) Nashville, Tennessee, U.S.
- Party: Republican
- Children: 2
- Education: Tennessee Technological University (BS); Vanderbilt University (JD)

David H. Simmons (born June 13, 1952) is a Republican politician from Florida. He represented parts of Greater Orlando in the Florida Senate from 2010 to 2020, and in the Florida House of Representatives from 2000 to 2008.

== History ==
Simmons was born in Nashville, Tennessee, and attended Tennessee Technological University, where he graduated with a degree in mathematics in 1974. Following graduation, he attended the Vanderbilt University Law School, receiving his Juris Doctor in 1977 and moving to the state of Florida later that year. He served on United States Senator Connie Mack's Federal Judicial Advisory Committee from 1989 to 1992, and joined the law firm of de Beaubien, Knight, Simmons, Mantzaris, & Neal, LLP, where he currently serves as an attorney and financial managing partner.

== Florida House of Representatives ==
In 1986, Simmons ran for the Florida House of Representatives from the 39th District, which was based in Orange County, against incumbent State Representative Fran Carlton. During the campaign, Simmons attacked Carlton for voting against the death penalty, which Carlton alleged was a false claim, saying, "Mr. Simmons has used misinformation, twisted facts, half-truths, and out-right untruths in his attempt to discredit my good name. He owes me a retraction, and he owes the voters an apology." Simmons stood by the advertisement, noting, "I have nothing to apologize for. My advertising is showing the real voting record of Fran Carlton." The Orlando Sentinel, though they "heartily" endorsed Carlton for re-election, praised Simmons as "a determined, self-made lawyer" who "has the potential to make contributions to Central Florida." Ultimately, Simmons lost to Carlton in a landslide, receiving 36% of the vote to her 64%.

Simmons ran for the legislature again in 2000, when incumbent State Representative Lee Constantine, who was term-limited, ran for the Florida Senate. Simmons ran to succeed Constantine in the 37th District, which was based in northern Orange County and central Seminole County. He faced Larry Strickler, a former Seminole County School Board member, in the Republican primary, and a contentious election followed, with Simmons accusing Strickler of being liberal and Strickler attacking Simmons as a "downtown Orlando trial attorney." The Sentinel endorsed Simmons in his second campaign for the legislature, noting that while both candidates had "lengthy resume" and were "well-versed on the issues," Simmons "articulates a firmer vision of what he sees as his priorities," which included an overhaul of transportation policy, preventing drugs from entering the state, and substantial campaign finance reform. Simmons ended up narrowly winning the primary election, receiving 53% of the vote to Strickler's 47%, and advancing to the general election, where he faced Ali Shahnami, the Democratic nominee. Shahnami did not prove to be a significant obstacle for Simmons, as he won in a landslide, receiving 70% of the vote to Shahnami's 30%. Running for re-election in 2002, Simmons was opposed by the Libertarian candidate Timothy Moriarty in the general election. He campaigned on his efforts to reform the nursing-home industry in the state and on his legislation that aimed to prevent drunken drivers from repeating their offenses and said that he planned on raising teacher salaries over the following five years. Simmons easily won his second term, defeating Moriarty in a landslide with 76% of the vote. He was unopposed for re-election in 2004 and 2006, winning his third and fourth terms entirely uncontested, and was unable to seek re-election in 2008 due to term limits.

== Florida Senate ==
When Constantine, whom Simmons had succeeded in the House, was unable to seek another term in the Florida Senate, Simmons ran to succeed him in the 22nd District, which stretched from Sanford to Winter Park in northern Orange County and western Seminole County. He was unopposed in both the Republican primary and the general election, winning his first term uncontested.

In 2012, following the reconfiguration of the state's legislative districts, Simmons was drawn into the 10th District, where he ran for re-election. The district maintained much of the territory that he had previously represented but dropped the incursion into Orange County and expanded into eastern Seminole County and southern Volusia County. He won the Republican primary unopposed and faced Leo Cruz, the Democratic nominee, in the general election. Though the contest was closer than any Simmons had faced in the past, he still won re-election by a solid margin, receiving 55% of the vote to Cruz's 45%.

During the 2014 legislative session, Simmons sponsored legislation that would have allowed "an applicant who is an unauthorized immigrant who was brought to this state as a minor and who has been a resident of this state for more than 10 years and has fulfilled all requirements for admission to practice law in this state" to be admitted to the Florida Bar. Simmons spoke strongly in favor, arguing, "We're going to right an injustice."

Simmons' district was reconfigured and renumbered after court-ordered redistricting in 2016. Simmons was term-limited from the Senate in 2020.

Florida House of Representatives
| Preceded by Lee Constantine | Member of the Florida House of Representatives from the 37th district 2000–2008 | Succeeded by Scott Plakon |
Florida Senate
| Preceded by Lee Constantine | Member of the Florida Senate from the 22nd district 2010–2012 | Succeeded by Jeff Brandes |
| Preceded by Ronda Storms | Member of the Florida Senate from the 10th district 2012–2016 | Succeeded by Wilton Simpson |
| Preceded by Audrey Gibson | Member of the Florida Senate from the 9th district 2016–2020 | Succeeded by Jason Brodeur |
| Preceded by Anitere Flores | President pro tempore of the Florida Senate; 2018–2020 | Succeeded by Aaron Bean |
