= Rudy Garcia =

Rudy Garcia may refer to:

- Rudy García (Florida politician) (born 1963), Republican member of the Florida Senate
- Rudy Garcia (New Jersey politician) (born 1964), American Democratic Party politician who served in the New Jersey General Assembly
- Rudy Joseph Garcia, killed by law enforcement
