= Daphne Campbell =

American politician

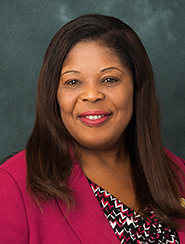

Member of the Florida Senate from the 38th district
- In office November 8, 2016 – November 6, 2018
- Preceded by: René García
- Succeeded by: Jason Pizzo

Member of the Florida House of Representatives from the 108th district
- Incumbent
- Assumed office November 3, 2026
- Preceded by: Dotie Joseph
- In office November 2, 2010 – November 8, 2016
- Preceded by: Ronald Brise
- Succeeded by: Roy Hardemon

Personal details
- Born: May 19, 1957 (age 69) Cap-Haïtien, Haiti
- Party: Democratic
- Education: SOD Nursing School (BSN)
- Profession: Registered nurse

Daphne D. Campbell (born May 19, 1957) is a former Democratic member of the Florida Senate who represented the 38th district, including Miami Beach, North Miami, and other parts of northeastern Miami-Dade County, since 2016. Previously, she served three terms in the Florida House of Representatives, representing the 108th district from 2010 to 2016. She was defeated by Jason Pizzo in a primary election on August 28, 2018. She ran for Senate District 35 in 2020.

She would once again win the Democratic nomination for the 108th district on August 18, 2026.

== History ==
Campbell was born in Cap-Haïtien, a city in northern Haiti, where she attended the SOD Nursing School, receiving her bachelor's degree in 1981.

== Florida House of Representatives ==
When incumbent state representative Ronald Brise accepted a position on the Florida Public Service Commission in 2010, an open seat was created in the 108th District. Campbell ran in the Democratic primary to succeed him, facing Alix Desulme. Following a contentious campaign, she narrowly defeated Desulme by fewer than 400 votes, winning 52% of the vote and advancing to the general election, which she won unopposed.

During her first legislative term, Campbell spoke strongly in favor of anti-abortion legislation, "speaking out against abortion and quoting the Bible," which prompted fellow Democrat Scott Randolph to remark that he "hoped Campbell enjoyed her two years in the House," implying that he intended to oppose her when she sought re-election. Campbell responded "You have no right. God put me here." Campbell alleged that during a verbal altercation about the matter, Randolph and Ron Saunders, the Minority Leader of the Florida House of Representatives, threw things at her, used foul language, and called her a "traitor." Campbell was also the only Florida House Democrat to vote in favor of a bill mandating a 24-hour waiting period to obtain an abortion. She co-sponsored legislation banning workplace pregnancy discrimination. However, despite this, she joined with her colleagues in the minority to oppose legislation that provided additional funding to private and virtual schools, instead calling for more money to be invested in public education.

In 2012, Campbell's family business was subject to an investigation by the IRS, with the agency applying liens totaling $145,000.00 on her and her husband after former business partners claimed the couple had scammed them. Campbell denied the existence of the liens to the Tampa Bay Times.

In the past, Campbell and her husband ran group homes for those with mental and physical health issues. However, the state removed their state funding after three patients died, one was raped, and others lived in squalor. The group home was shut down afterward. In 2011, she co-sponsored a bill to block public disclosure of dangerous group homes.

Following the reconfiguration of legislative districts in 2012, Campbell remained in the 108th District, which retained most of the territory that she had represented previously. She was opposed in the primary by Desulme, her 2010 opponent, and Pat Santangelo. Campbell defeated both of them easily, winning 60% of the vote to Desulme's 23% and Santangelo's 17%. She was re-elected in the general election without any opposition.

In 2013, after her husband's minivan received several tickets issued by red-light cameras, Campbell sponsored legislation opposing traffic-surveillance cameras.

On April 11, 2025, Campbell filed to run in the 108th District. She qualified for the election on June 8, 2026, and will appear on the ballot in the August primary election. She would win the Democratic primary on August 18, 2026 with 46.1% of the vote.

== Florida Senate ==
In 2016, Campbell ran for a new Florida Senate seat created after court-ordered redistricting. She defeated five other candidates in the Democratic primary with 31% of the vote, and won the general election against former state representative Philip Brutus, who ran without party affiliation, 75 to 25%.

In 2017, Rise News reported that Campbell had used personal connections with Florida Power and Light officials to get service restored to her home and the homes of family members under the pretenses of assisting her ailing mother in the aftermath of Hurricane Irma in September, 2017. Campbell, whose mother died in 1996, shared the information with Rise News during an event she hosted in her district that was co-sponsored by the Church of Scientology. During this event, she also attacked fellow Democratic state senator Jean Monestime for not being present in the aftermath of the hurricane.

On Thursday, August 9, Campbell attended a campaign event in the lead-up to the Democratic primary in her district. At the event, hosted by the Social Citizens of Southeast Florida, Campbell was approached by a reporter with the Miami Herald. After declining to grant an interview to the Herald, Campbell called North Miami Beach Police on the reporter, claiming threats had been made against her. Police found no evidence any threats had been made. The August incident was preceded by a similar event in which Campbell had called police on a reporter at a Miami Shores Village Council meeting in May, 2018.

Campbell was defeated in the Democratic primary in 2018 by Jason Pizzo, an unsuccessful candidate in the 2016 primary. Pizzo won the general election.

Campbell attempted a comeback in 2020 and ran for Senate District 35 being vacated by term-limited incumbent Oscar Braynon. In the Democratic primary, Campbell placed second behind eventual winner Shevrin Jones.
