= John Hill (Florida politician) =

American politician (1931–1993)

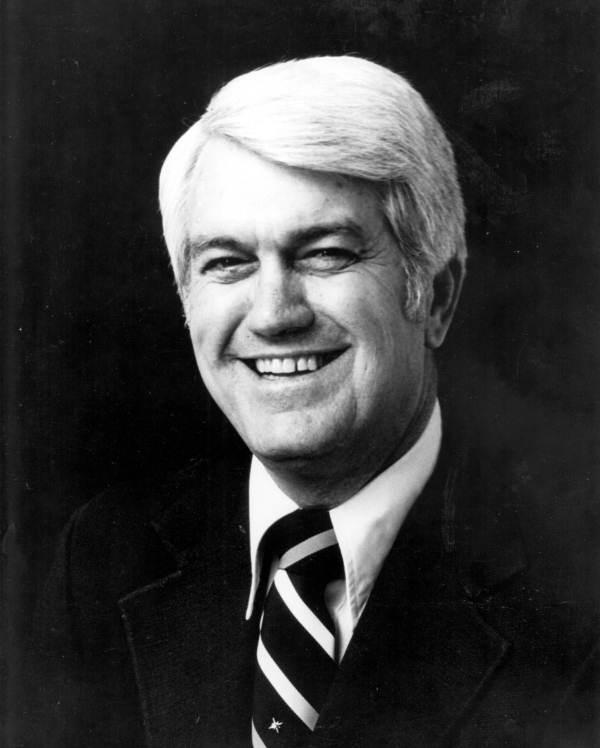

Member of the Florida Senate from the 33rd district
- In office November 7, 1978 – June 30, 1988
- Preceded by: Bob Graham
- Succeeded by: Roberto Casas

Member of the Florida House of Representatives from the 108th district
- In office November 5, 1974 – November 7, 1978
- Preceded by: Charles H. Snowden
- Succeeded by: Robert Reynolds

Personal details
- Born: May 20, 1931 Miami, Florida, U.S.
- Died: January 22, 1993 (aged 61) Miami, Florida, U.S.
- Party: Democratic
- Spouse: Vivian Carlson
- Children: 3
- Education: Miami Dade Junior College
- Occupation: Businessman

John A. Hill (May 20, 1931 – January 22, 1993) was a Democratic politician from Florida who served as a member of the Florida House of Representatives from the 108th district from 1974 to 1978 and as a member of the Florida Senate from the 33rd district from 1978 to 1988. Hill resigned from the Senate on June 30, 1988,

Hill died on January 22, 1993, at the age of 61.
