= Florida's 102nd House of Representatives district =

Florida district

Florida's 102nd State House of Representatives district
Representative
Michael Friend; D

Florida's 102nd House of Representatives district elects one member of the Florida House of Representatives. It contains parts of Broward County.

== Members ==
- Gwen Margolis (November 5, 1974 – November 4, 1980)
- Luis Rojas (1992–2000)
- Ralph Arza (2000–2006)
- Eduardo González (2006–2012)
- Michael Gottlieb (2018–2026)
- Michael Friend (since 2026)
