= Katherine Fernandez Rundle =

American politician

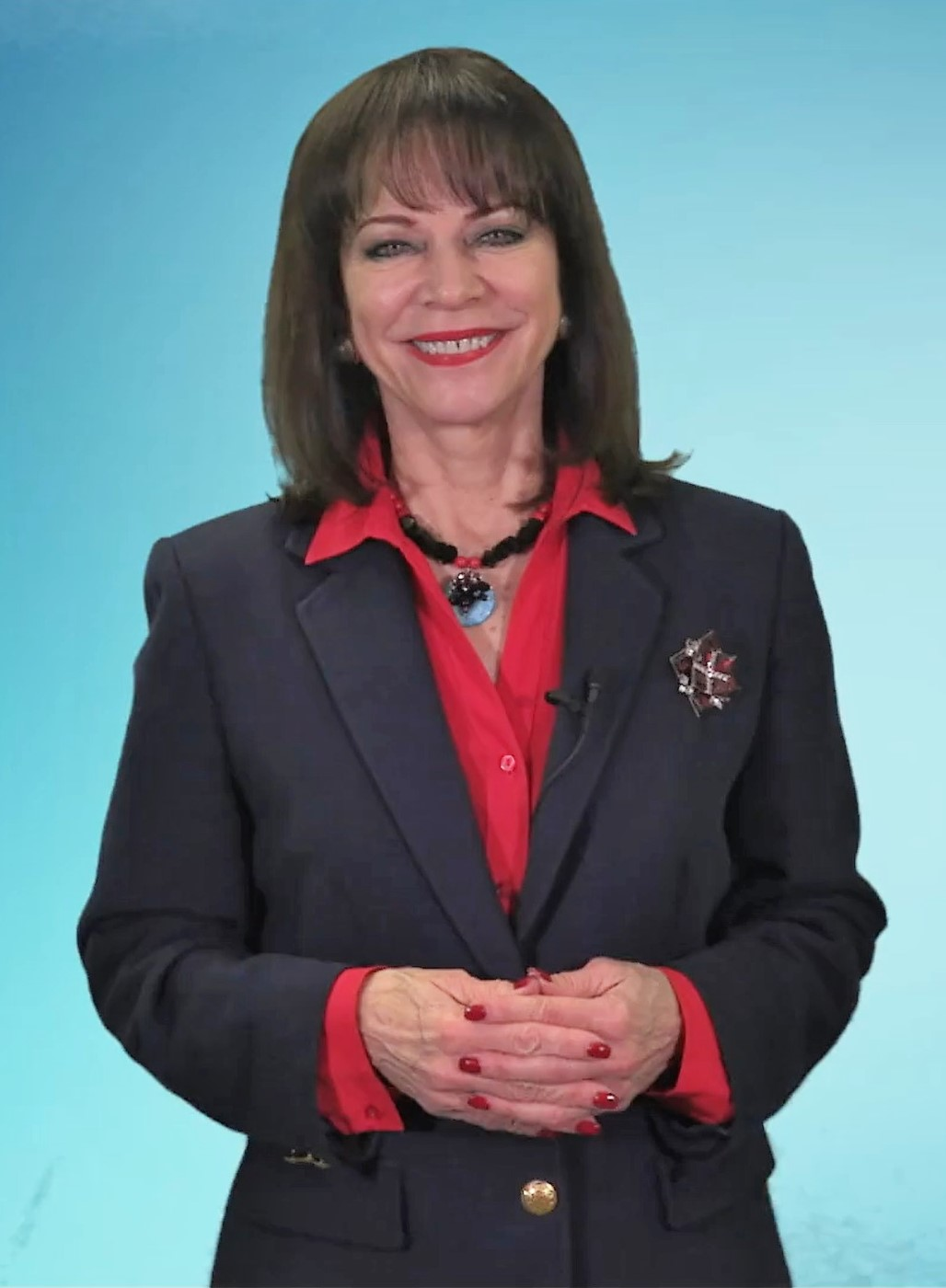
- Rundle in 2022

State Attorney for Miami-Dade County
- Incumbent
- Assumed office March 12, 1993
- Preceded by: Janet Reno

Personal details
- Born: March 1, 1950 (age 76) Washington, D.C., U.S.
- Party: Democratic
- Education: University of Miami (BA, MA); University of Cambridge (LLB)
- Website: Official website

Katherine Fernandez Rundle (born March 1, 1950) is the current State Attorney for Miami-Dade County in Florida.

== Education ==
Rundle is a graduate of Miami Palmetto Senior High and received a B.A. and M.A. in Criminology from the University of Miami and an LL.B. from the Faculty of Law, University of Cambridge.

== Career ==
Prior to her appointment in 1993 as Miami-Dade County's and Florida's first female Hispanic (Cuban-American) State Attorney, having been re-elected six times since 1993.

She served as an Assistant State Attorney for 15 years. In her role as Chief Assistant to then-State Attorney Janet Reno, she acted as legal counsel to the Miami-Dade County Grand Jury and created the State's first domestic violence unit.

Rundle helped write and pass the Florida Punishment Code, and was involved in the formation of Dade County's Drug Court, Truancy Intervention Program, and Juvenile Assessment Center.

=== Child Support Program ===
Rundle is the only State Attorney in Florida operating a Child Support Enforcement Office, with over 65,000 cases processed annually by her staff. She created legislation that added child support orders to the Florida Crime Information Computer (FCIC) making them accessible to every Florida police officer.

=== Seal and Expunge Program ===
In 2006, partnering with the Clerk of the Miami-Dade Courts Harvey Ruvin, the American Civil Liberties Union of Florida, Miami Dade Elections Department, and South Florida Workforce, State Attorney Fernandez Rundle created the "Second Chance" Seal and Expunge Program. Monthly workshops held in different parts of the county offer free assistance to eligible ex-offenders in completing the Florida Department of Law Enforcement's (FDLE) application for the sealing or expungement of a single qualifying case.

In many instances, eligible ex-offenders are also able to apply to have their civil rights restored once FDLE has determined their eligibility.

=== Human Trafficking Task Force ===
In 2012 State Attorney Fernandez Rundle created a broad coalition of law enforcement agencies and community services to combat human trafficking including a prosecution unit of specialized attorneys and investigators to target human traffickers.

=== Veterans Court ===
In January 2017, State Attorney Fernandez Rundle marked the creation of a Miami-Dade Veterans Court along with numerous partner stakeholders. After years of planning and coordination and receiving a U.S. Department of Justice grant, the Veteran's Court got off the ground with a liaison staffer, stationed at the jail, to help identify veterans and refer them to necessary services within hours of their arrest.

=== Darren Rainey death scandal ===
Rundle's office refused to prosecute four prison guards connected to the death of Darren Rainey, an African-American prisoner who suffered from schizophrenia. In 2012, the prison guards allegedly locked Rainey inside of a running hot shower for nearly two hours, boiling his internal organs, killing him. Another inmate said he heard Rainey yelling and kicking the door and begging to be taken out. Despite the incident having been recorded on video, Rundle concluded that the inmate's claims were not supported by the evidence.

Additionally, witnesses reported that Rainey's skin appeared to have been "peeled back", the autopsy found that those marks were caused by friction. Rundle's report concluded that Rainey's death was an "accident" resulting from his mental condition, a heart condition, and "confinement in the shower".

At a May 30, 2017, South Florida AFL-CIO meeting, Rundle took questions from the public about the case. An "energetic" crowd questioned her, with some demanding her resignation. Attendees held up signs that read "RESIGN", "BLACK LIVES MATTER", and "JUSTICE FOR DARREN RAINEY" and audience members responded to Rundle with "laughter, jeers, and hisses". According to the Miami New Times, Rundle described the public's concern about the case as "mob mentality".

State Rep. Roy Hardemon, who was among those present, called for Rundle's resignation, criticizing her office for ignoring the black community's concerns about police-involved killings and use of force. He said he had seen her office "prosecute a paperclip" when it comes to civilians but make excuses when it came to state employees such as police officers.

Other audience members chastised Rundle for having committed 24 years of "intellectual" negligence by refusing to prosecute scores of officers who had wrongly killed civilians and for having never lobbied the Florida Legislature for laws making it easier for prosecutors to hold cops accountable. When a party member angrily raised the fact that Rundle's office had never charged an on-duty officer for killing someone, Rundle gave no response.

In the weeks prior to the meeting, Rundle's assistant state attorneys spoke to Miami-Dade Democratic party members in which they disparaged the media for their reporting into the Rainey abuse allegations.

According to a June 2017 Miami New Times report, Rundle had blocked more than 100 Twitter users, many of whom were "either critical of her record or advocating for justice for Rainey".

=== Demand for resignation ===
On June 21, 2017, the Miami-Dade County Democratic Executive Committee passed a non-binding resolution urging Rundle resign "if she cannot pursue justice for victims of crime, including the most vulnerable. [We] strongly condemn the State Attorney's Office's decision not to bring charges against the officers who locked Mr. Rainey in a hot shower for two hours, resulting in his death, and the jail's supervisors, who failed to report the crime."

Former Miami-Dade Democratic head Juan Cuba, in a July 2019 interview, said: "Look, 26 years is enough time. I worry about any politician that tries to hold onto power for long. She should pass the torch."

=== Murder charges against teenager ===
In 2015, Rundle charged Deandre Charles, a 15-year-old Black teenager, with the murder of Joseph Raksin, a New York City rabbi, based on a poorly drawn facial sketch that was compared to a Sesame Street character. A year later, charges were dropped, and in 2019, Charles filed a lawsuit alleging that both Rundle's office and the involved police officers possessed exonerating evidence even before he was charged.
