= Ralph Arza =

American politician (born 1960)

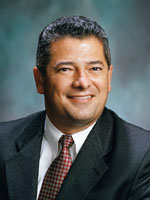

Member of the Florida House of Representatives from the 102nd district
- In office November 7, 2000 – November 1, 2006
- Preceded by: Luis Rojas
- Succeeded by: Eduardo González

Personal details
- Born: March 26, 1960 (age 66) Oriente Province, Cuba
- Party: Republican
- Education: Miami-Dade Community College (A.A.); Florida International University (B.S.)
- Occupation: teacher

Rafael "Ralph" Arza (born March 26, 1960) is a Republican politician who served as a member of the Florida House of Representatives from the 102nd District from 2000 to 2006. He sought re-election in 2006, but resigned on November 1, 2006, and was subsequently arrested for witness tampering.

== Early life and career ==
Arza was born in Oriente Province, Cuba, in 1960, and moved to Florida in 1966. He attended Miami-Dade Community College, receiving his associate degree in 1981, and Florida International University, graduating with his bachelor's degree in social studies education in 1985. After graduating, he taught history at Miami Senior High School.

In 1996, Arza ran for the Dade County School Board from District 5. He lost the Republican primary in a landslide to Demetrio Perez Jr., who operated Lincoln-Martí Schools, winning 12 percent of the vote to Perez's 61 percent of the vote.

Later that year, Arza ran for one of the three elected seats on the newly created Dora Community Council. He tied for third place with Pepe Cancio, and though a runoff election was meant to be held, County Commissioner Miriam Alonso persuaded Arza to resign so that Cancio could be elected unopposed, and then she appointed Arza to one of the seats on the Council reserved for her appointment.

== Florida House of Representatives ==
In 2000, Republican State Representative Luis Rojas was term-limited and unable to seek re-election. Arza ran to succeed him in the 102nd district, which was based in Hialeah, and he resigned his position on the Doral Community Council. He faced businessman Hector Rivera, who served on a local community council, and account manager Frank Serra in the Republican primary. He won the Republican primary in a landslide, receiving 68 percent of the vote, while Serra and Rivera each won 16 percent. Because no other candidates filed for the election, Arza was elected.

Arza was re-elected unopposed in 2002 and 2004.

In 2006, Arza ran for re-election. However, on April 26, 2006, Rudy Crew, the county schools superintendent, accused Arza of using racial slurs to refer to both the district's African-American students and to Crew himself. Fellow State Representative Gustavo Barreiro filed a complaint against Arza with the State House based on the allegations. Several days after Barreiro's complaint was made public, Arza called him while intoxicated and left an "angry message on voicemail, cursing him out and calling Miami-Dade Superintendent Rudy Crew the N-word." In response, Barreiro reported the phone call to the police, which opened an investigation. In response, House Speaker Allan Bense convened a bipartisan panel to "advise if discipline is warranted and whether expulsion or censure or public reprimand may be the more suitable punishment." State Representative J. Dudley Goodlette, who chaired the House Rules Committee, called on Arza to resign to avoid an expulsion vote.

Arza ultimately resigned from the House on November 1, 2006, and was charged with felonies for retaliating against and tampering with a witness. He was replaced on the ballot by Eduardo González.
