= Charles H. Snowden =

American football player, judge and politician

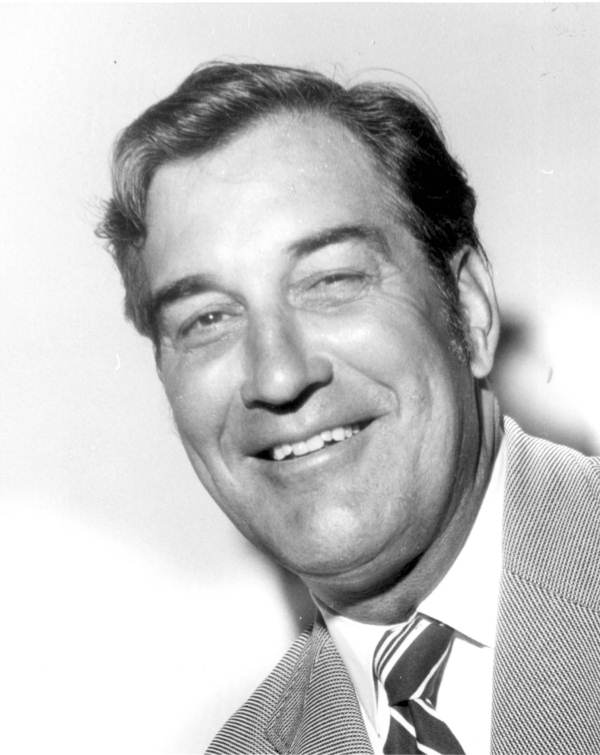
- Snowden in 1972

Member of the Florida House of Representatives from the 108th district
- In office 1972–1974
- Preceded by: Marshall Harris
- Succeeded by: John Hill

Personal details
- Born: October 4, 1922
- Died: July 22, 1997 (aged 74)
- Party: Democratic
- Education: University of Miami
- Occupation: Judge
- Football career

Profile
- Position: Guard

Career information
- College: Miami Hurricanes

Charles H. Snowden (October 4, 1922 – July 22, 1997) was an American football player, judge and politician. He served as a Democratic member for the 108th district of the Florida House of Representatives.

== Life and career ==
Snowden attended the University of Miami where he played for the football team.

Snowden was a municipal judge.

In 1972, Snowden was elected to represent the 108th district of the Florida House of Representatives, succeeding Marshall Harris. He served until 1974, when he was succeeded by John Hill.

Snowden died in July 1997, at the age of 74.
