= Marshall Harris (politician) =

American politician (1932–2009)

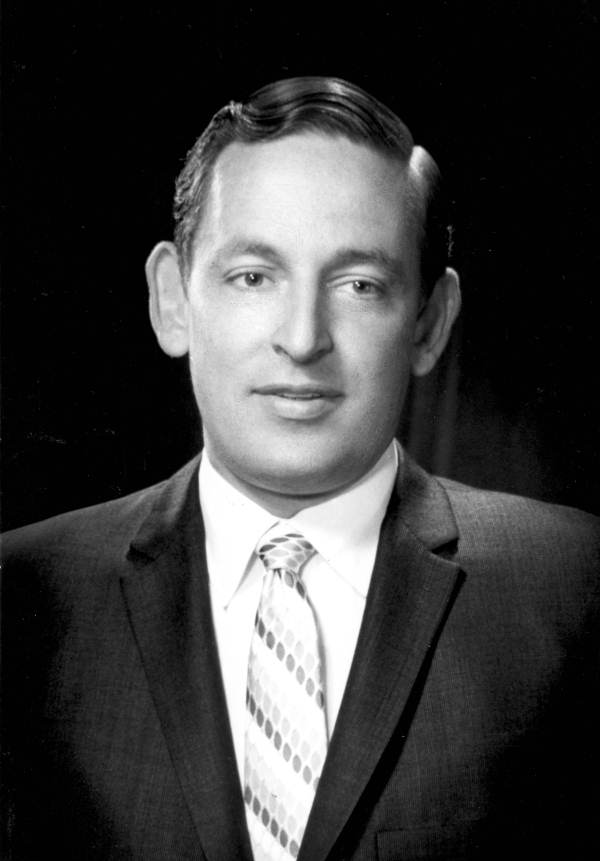

Member of the Florida House of Representatives
- In office March 28, 1967 – November 5, 1974
- Preceded by: District established
- Succeeded by: Barry Richard
- Constituency: 108th district (1967–1972); 112th district (1972–1974)

Personal details
- Born: February 1, 1932 Detroit, Michigan
- Died: November 2, 2009 (aged 77) Miami, Florida
- Party: Democratic
- Spouse: Harriet Lipton
- Education: Harvard College; Harvard Law School
- Occupation: Attorney

Marshall S. Harris (February 1, 1932 – November 2, 2009) was a Democratic politician and attorney from Florida who served as a member of the Florida House of Representatives from 1967 to 1974.
