= Barry Richard =

American politician

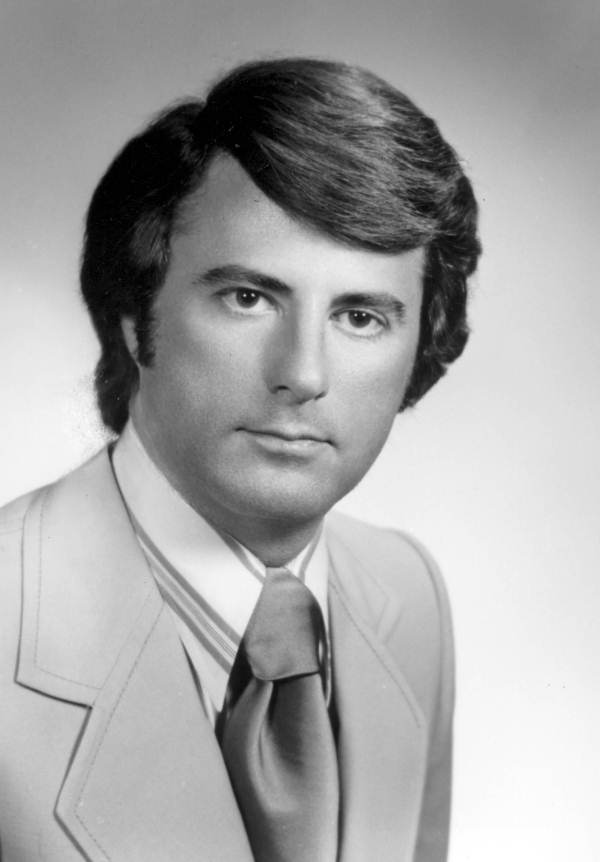

Member of the Florida House of Representatives from the 112th district
- In office November 5, 1974 – November 7, 1978
- Preceded by: Marshall Harris
- Succeeded by: Larry Plummer

Personal details
- Born: March 28, 1942 (age 84) Miami Beach, Florida, U.S.
- Party: Democratic
- Spouse: Allison Tant
- Children: 5
- Education: University of Miami (BA, JD)

Military service
- Branch/service: United States Navy

Barry Richard (born March 28, 1942) is an American attorney and politician who served as a member of the Florida House of Representatives from 1974 to 1978.

== Early life and education ==
Richard is a native of Miami Beach. He received his bachelor's degree from the University of Miami and a Juris Doctor from the University of Miami School of Law.

== Career ==
Richard served in the United States Navy Judge Advocate General's Corps. From 1974 to 1978, he served as a member of the Florida House of Representatives. He ran for the attorney general of Florida in 1978, but lost the Democratic primary to James C. Smith. In 1998, Richard served as the campaign legal counsel to Jeb Bush and Bill Nelson. He also represented George W. Bush in Bush v. Gore. In 2018, he represented Andrew Gillum during the gubernatorial vote recount.

Richard is the principal at Barry Richard Law Firm].

== Personal life ==
He is married to Allison Tant and they have three children. Richard also has two children from a previous marriage.

Florida House of Representatives
Preceded by Marshall S. Harris	Member of the Florida House of Representatives from the 112th district 1974–1978	Succeeded by Larry Plummer
