= Larry Plummer =

American politician (1940–2004)

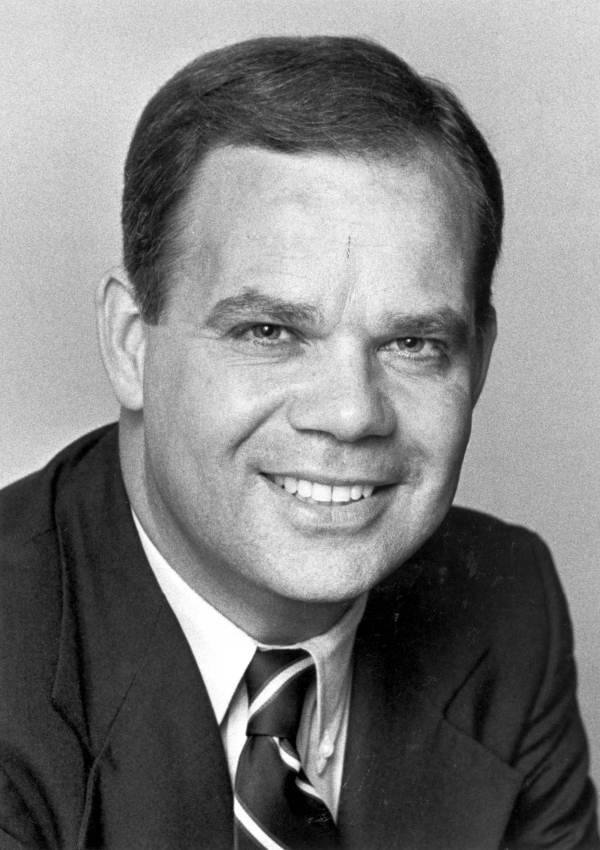

Member of the Florida Senate from the 39th district
- In office November 2, 1982 – November 3, 1992
- Preceded by: Dick Renick
- Succeeded by: Daryl Jones (redistricting)

Member of the Florida House of Representatives from the 112th district
- In office November 7, 1978 – November 2, 1982
- Preceded by: Barry Richard
- Succeeded by: John Cosgrove

Personal details
- Born: October 27, 1940 Miami, Florida
- Died: September 16, 2004 (aged 63) Miami, Florida
- Party: Democratic
- Relatives: J. L. Plummer (brother)
- Education: University of Miami (B.B.A.)
- Occupation: Funeral director

Lawrence H. Plummer (born October 27, 1940 – September 16, 2004) was a Democratic politician from Florida who served as a member of the Florida House of Representatives from the 112th district from 1978 to 1982 and as a member of the Florida Senate from the 39th district from 1982 to 1992.

== Early life ==
Plummer was born in Miami in 1940. His father, Joseph L. Plummer, served as a member of the Dade County School Board, and his great-grandfather, J. W. V. R. Plummer, served in the Florida House of Representatives in 1881 and was the mayor of Key West in 1884. Plummer graduated from Miami Senior High School and then the University of Miami in 1963, receiving his bachelor's degree in business administration. He and his brother, J. L. Plummer, who was later the longest-serving member of the Miami City Commission, ran the Ahern-Plummer Funeral Home, which their father had purchased in 1949.

== Florida House of Representatives ==
In 1978, Plummer ran for the Florida House of Representatives from the 112th district, seeking to succeed Democratic State Representative Barry Richard, who unsuccessfully ran for Attorney General. He won the Democratic primary over Marvin Dunn, a psychologist, with 55 percent of the vote. In the general election, Plummer defeated former State Representative Nancy Harrington, the Republican nominee, receiving 61 percent of the vote to her 39 percent.

Plummer ran for re-election in 1980, and was challenged by Ellis Riera-Gomez, a public relations specialist. He defeated Riera-Gomez with 58 percent of the vote.

== Florida Senate ==
In 1982, Plummer ran for the Florida Senate from the 39th district, challenging incumbent Senator Dick Renick in the Democratic primary. He narrowly placed second in the primary, winning 34 percent of the vote to Renick's 35 percent, while businessman Ed Felton placed third with 16 percent and attorney Richard Lewis received 15 percent. In the runoff, Plummer defeated Renick, winning 59 percent of the vote to Renick's 41 percent.

Plummer was elected to a second term in 1984 unopposed. He ran for a third term in 1988, and was challenged by former State Representative Gene Flinn, who had served in the legislature as a Democrat, but switched to the Republican Party afterward. Plummer defeated Flinn in a landslide, winning 66 percent of the vote to Flinn's 34 percent.

In 1992, after Plummer's district was significantly redrawn, he declined to seek re-election, and was succeeded by Daryl Jones.

== Death ==
Plummer died on September 16, 2004.
