= Florida's 40th Senate district =

American legislative district

Florida's 40th State Senate district
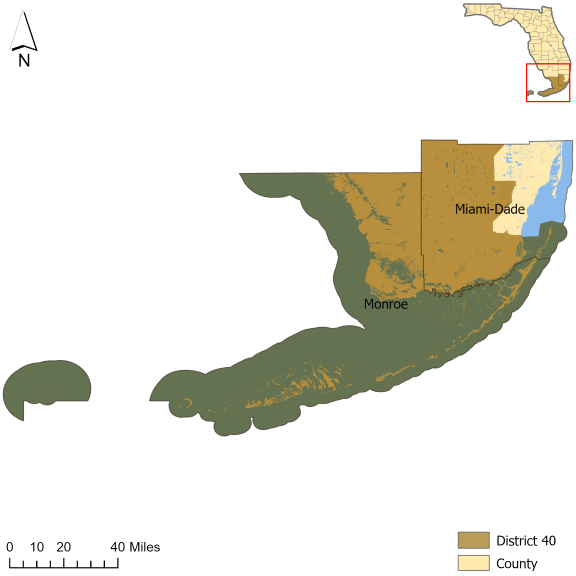
Senator
Ana María Rodríguez; R–Doral
- Demographics: 19% White; 7% Black; 70% Hispanic; 2% Asian; 1% Other; 1% Multiracial
- Population (2023): 538,601

Florida's 40th Senate district elects one member of the Florida Senate. The district consists of all of Monroe County and most of Miami-Dade County, in the U.S. state of Florida. The current senator is Republican Ana María Rodríguez.

== List of senators ==
Full list of senators from the 40th district (1845–2006).

Portrait	Name	Party	Years of service	Home city/state	Notes
	Hayward Davis	Democratic	1962–1966	Clewiston, Florida	Consisted of Highlands County
	Edmond Gong	Democratic	1966–1972	Miami, Florida	Redistricted; Consisted of part of Miami-Dade County
	Don Gruber	Republican	1972–1974	Chicago, Illinois	Consisted of part of Miami-Dade County
	Dick Renick	Republican	1974–1978	Yonkers, New York	Consisted of part of Miami-Dade County
	Dick Anderson	Democratic	1978–1982	Midland, Michigan	Consisted of part of Miami-Dade County
	Roberta Fox	Democratic	1982–1886		Consisted of part of Miami-Dade County
	Dexter Lehtinen	Republican	1986–1988	Homestead, Florida	Consisted of part of Miami-Dade County
	Javier Souto	Republican	1988–1992		
	Daryl Jones	Democratic	1992–2002	Jackson, Mississippi	Consisted of part of Miami-Dade County
	Rudy García	Republican	2002–2010	Miami, Florida	Consisted of part of Miami-Dade County
	René García	Republican	2010–2012	Hialeah, Florida	Consisted of part of Miami-Dade County
	Miguel Diaz de la Portilla	Republican	2012–2016	Miami, Florida	Redistricted from the 36th district; Consisted of part of Miami-Dade County
	Frank Artiles	Republican	2016–2017	Los Angeles, California	Consisted of part of Miami-Dade County
	Annette Taddeo	Democratic	2017–2022	Barrancabermeja, Colombia	Consisted of part of Miami-Dade County
	Ana María Rodríguez	Republican	2022–present	Miami, Florida	Consists all of Monroe County and part of Miami-Dade County

== Elections ==
=== 2018 ===
2018 Florida's 40th senate district election
Party	Candidate	Votes	%
Democratic	Annette Taddeo (incumbent)	90,924	53.5
Republican	Marili Cancio	79,068	46.5
Majority		11,856	7.0
Total votes		169,992	100.0

=== 2022 ===
2022 Florida's 40th senate district election
Party	Candidate	Votes	%
Republican	Ana Maria Rodriguez (incumbent)	Unopposed	
Total votes		—	—
Republican hold			

=== 2026 ===
Incumbent senator Ana Maria Rodriguez will be term-limited in 2030 and is set to run for re-election in 2026
