= Ronald Brisé =

American politician (born 1974)

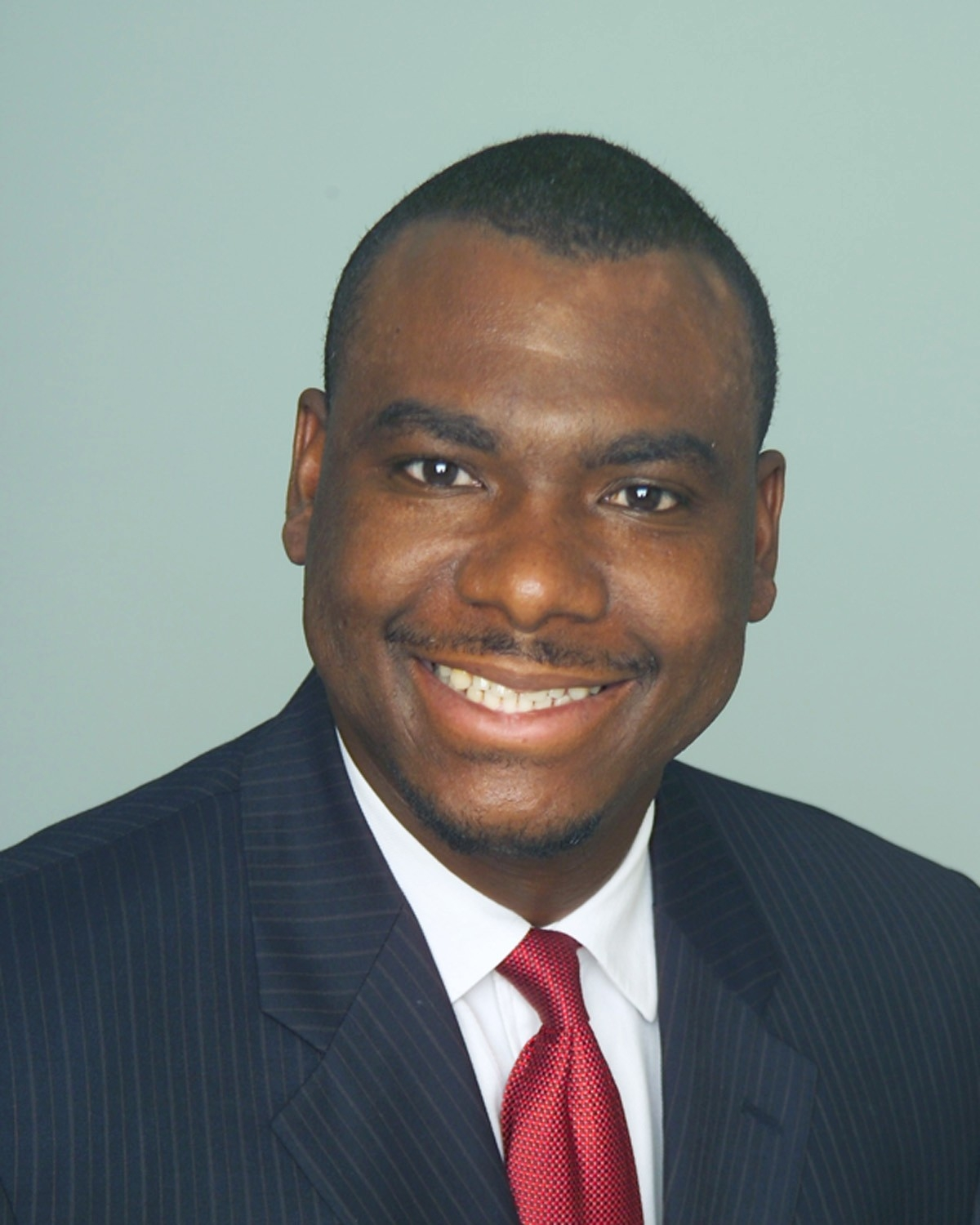

Personal details
- Born: June 12, 1974 (age 52) Port-au-Prince, Haiti
- Party: Democratic
- Spouse: Jo An S. Brisé
- Children: 2
- Education: Oakwood College; American Intercontinental University

Ronald A. Brisé (born June 12, 1974) is a Democratic politician from Florida. He served in the Florida House of Representatives representing the 108th district, and as a commissioner for the Florida Public Service Commission. He is Haitian-American.

== Early life and education ==
Brisé was born on June 12, 1974, to Roland Brisé, a pastor with the Seventh-day Adventist Church for more than 30 years and Nicole Henry, his wife for 36 years. Brisé attended high school at Miami Union Academy (established in 1917), where he served in student government, and was co-captain of the basketball team, a class officer and an officer in the Honor Society. He was nominated to Who's Who Among America's High School Students and was selected to represent the state of Florida at the Congressional Young Leaders Conference in Washington, D.C., in 1992. As an adult, Brisé later returned to Miami Union Academy, where he served as chairperson of the science department, sponsor for the student government, basketball coach, trumpet coach and vice-president of the teacher's association. He is currently the vice-president of the Miami Union Academy's alumni association. Brisé graduated from Oakwood College in Huntsville, Alabama, with degrees in biology and biology education. Upon graduation from college, Brisé taught science at his alma mater, Miami Union Academy. He eventually became responsible for the school's development and fundraising operations.

He later earned two MBAs, one in marketing and the other in management at American Intercontinental University in Illinois.

In 2005, Brisé served as executive vice-president and chief operating officer of IPIP Corp., an international telecommunications carrier based in Miami, Florida.

Brisé began his career in public service in North Miami as a member of the North Miami Planning Commission. Brisé would go on to serve as a community liaison for State House District 108 and was a member of the Planning Commission for the City of North Miami.

== State legislature ==
After a crowded race for Miami-Dade's open Democratic seat, Brisé was elected to the Florida House of Representatives in 2006, succeeding Philip Brutus as Representative from the 108th District, which encompasses the communities of North Miami, Miami Shores, Pinewood, Biscayne Gardens, El Portal, Biscayne Park and a portion of Miami. Brisé was reelected unopposed for the 2008–2010 term.

== Florida Public Service Commission ==
Governor Charlie Crist appointed Brisé to the Florida Public Service Commission in July 2010. Rick Scott later appointed him to a second term.and was reappointed by Governor Rick Scott for a term through January 2014.

In December 2011, he was elected to chair the Commission through January 1, 2014.

Brisé is a member of the National Association of Regulatory Utility Commissioners (NARUC).

Brisé served on the commissionuntil the expiration of his term on January 1, 2018.

== Personal life ==
Brisé is a Seventh-day Adventist.
