= René García (politician) =

American politician

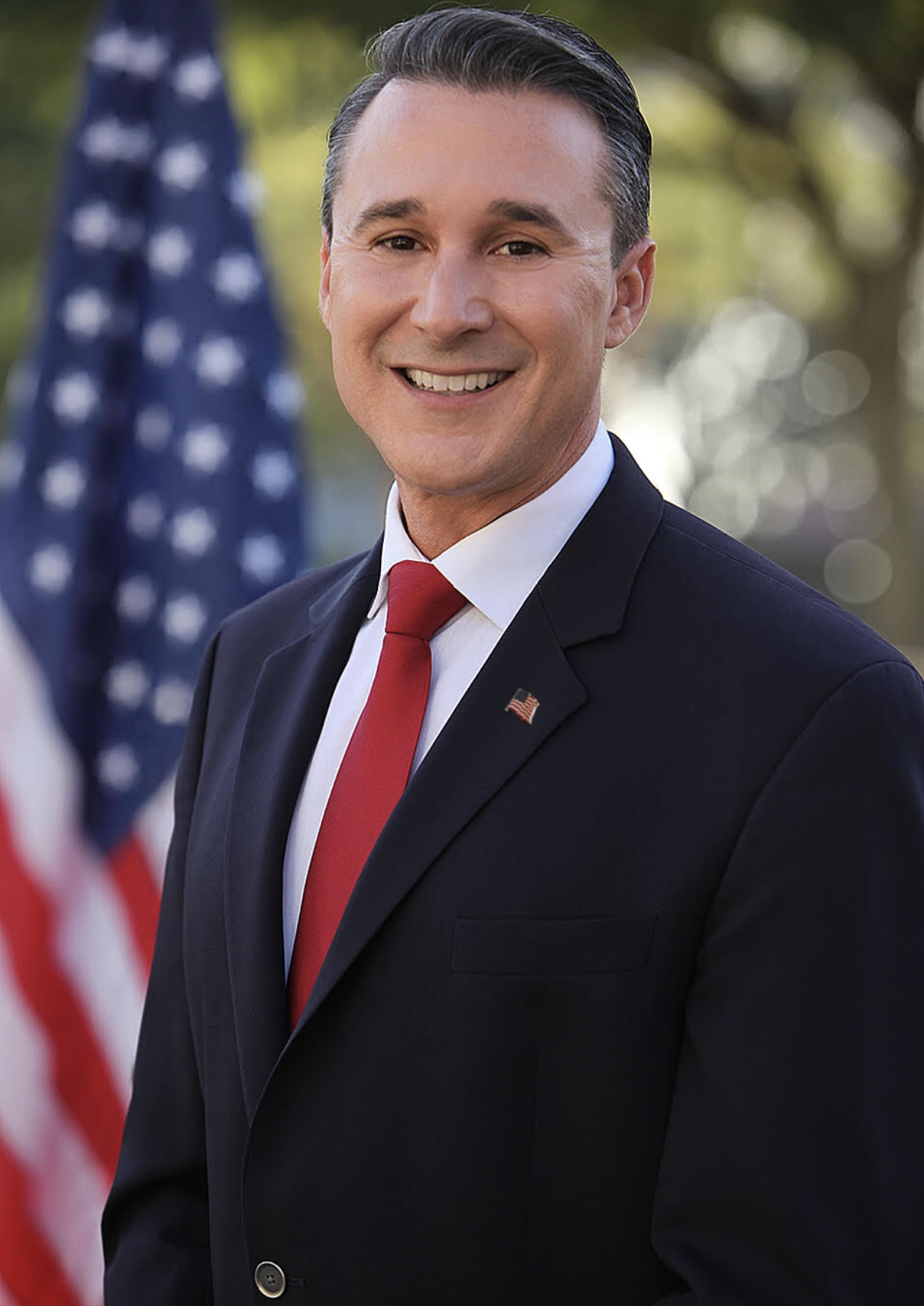

Member of the Miami-Dade County Commission from the 13th district
- Incumbent
- Assumed office November 17, 2020
- Preceded by: Esteban Bovo

Member of the Florida Senate
- In office November 2, 2010 – November 6, 2018
- Preceded by: Rudy García
- Succeeded by: Manny Díaz Jr.
- Constituency: 40th district (2010—2012); 38th district (2012—2016); 36th district (2016—2018)

Member of the Florida House of Representatives from the 110th district
- In office November 7, 2000 – November 4, 2008
- Preceded by: Rudy García
- Succeeded by: Esteban Bovo

Personal details
- Born: July 10, 1974 (age 52) Hialeah, Florida, U.S.
- Party: Republican
- Education: Miami-Dade Community College (AA); Florida International University (BA); University of Miami (MBA)
- Profession: Hospital administrator

René García (born July 10, 1974) is an American politician who has served as a Miami-Dade County commissioner since 2020, representing the Hialeah area. A member of the Republican Party, he previously served in the Florida Senate from 2010 to 2018 and in the Florida House of Representatives from 2000 to 2008.

== Early life ==
García was born in Hialeah and attended Miami-Dade Community College, where he graduated with an Associate degree in 1996. Afterwards, he attended Florida International University, where he received a degree in political science in 1999. García then graduated from the University of Miami with a Master of Business Administration in health care administration in 2004. In 1995, while still in college, he ran for a position on the Hialeah City Council, but he received only 2% of the vote. Two years later, he ran again, and this time won with 18% of the vote. García was re-elected to his position in 1999.

== Florida House of Representatives ==
In 2000, when incumbent State Representative Rudy García ran for the Florida Senate, which resulted in an open seat. René García ran to succeed Rudy García, and defeated Andy Pérez in the Republican primary with 55% of the vote. He was re-elected without opposition in 2002, 2004, and 2006, and could not seek another term in 2008 due to term limits.

== Florida Senate ==
When Rudy García could not run for the Senate again due to term limits, René García once again ran to succeed him. He faced no opposition in the primary or the general election, and thus won his first term in the 40th District unopposed. When Florida Senate districts were redrawn in 2012, García was redistricted into the 38th District, which included most of the territory that he had previously represented. Once again, he was elected unopposed.

While serving in the Senate, García joined with State Representative Michael Bileca to sponsor legislation that prevented state and local governments in Florida from doing business with companies that were connected to Cuba. When the Florida Chamber of Commerce opposed the legislation, Garcia blasted them, calling their opposition "an abomination to the very fabric of our state and country." The law was later struck down, however, by the United States Court of Appeals for the Eleventh Circuit, which said that it "reaches far beyond federal law in numerous ways and undermines the president's exercise of the discretion afford him by Congress." Additionally, García joined with State Representative Manny Diaz, Jr. to sponsor legislation that would ban Cuban-trained doctors from practicing in Florida, noting, "The Fidel Castro medical scholarship program is purely a propaganda tool. Hopefully this legislation will stop American citizens from participating in Cuba's medical apartheid program."

García worked with Democratic State Senator Dwight Bullard to continue subsidizing private tutoring companies in Florida, an effort that ultimately failed. Speaking in defense of their proposal, García asserted, "What we're trying to do is keep it in law that the students have the option of tutoring services, both public and private. At the end of the day, the ones who benefit from this are minority students." García also joined Democrats in the Senate to defeat the controversial "parent trigger" legislation, which "would have allowed parents with students at F-rated schools to petition their school board to select one of the state's mandated turnaround options--which include converting it to a charter school."

== Miami-Dade County Commissioner ==
Garcia ran for the open commission seat being vacated by Esteban Bovo who is term-limited and running for Dade County Mayor. Garcia ran in the nonpartisan primary against Adrian Jimenez beating his opponent with 77%, because Garcia won overwhelmingly in the primary a runoff was not needed and took office in November.

Florida House of Representatives
Preceded by Rudy García	Member of the Florida House of Representatives from the 110th district 2000–2008	Succeeded by Esteban Bovo
Florida Senate
Preceded by Rudy García	Member of the Florida Senate from the 40th district 2010–2012	Succeeded by Miguel Díaz de la Portilla
Preceded by Anitere Flores	Member of the Florida Senate from the 38th district 2012–2016	Succeeded by Daphne Campbell
Preceded by Oscar Braynon	Member of the Florida Senate from the 36th district 2016–2018	Succeeded by Manny Díaz Jr.
Political offices
Preceded by Esteban Bovo	Member of the Miami-Dade County Commission from the 13th district 2020–present	Incumbent
