= Don Gruber =

American politician

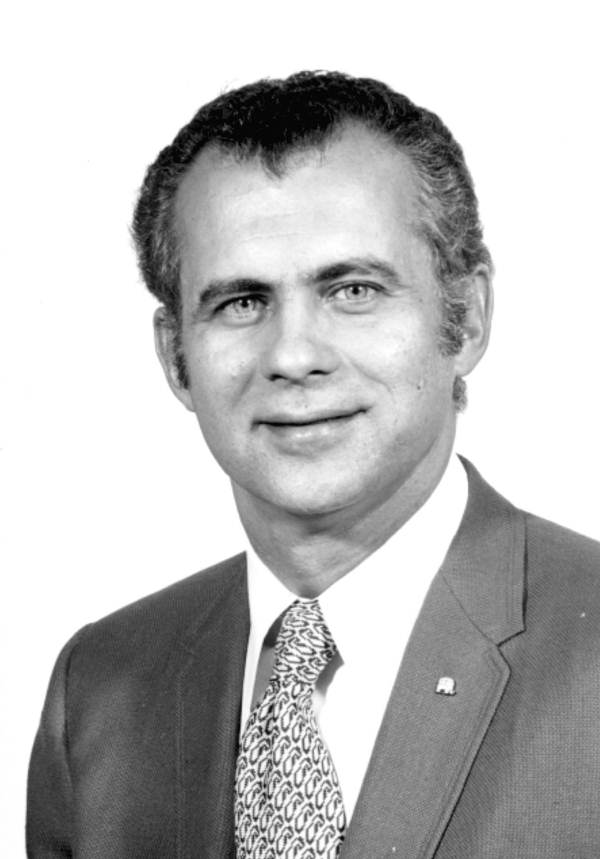

Member of the Florida Senate from the 40th district
- In office 1972–1974
- Preceded by: Edmond Gong
- Succeeded by: Dick Renick

Personal details
- Born: July 27, 1930 Chicago, Illinois, U.S.
- Died: October 22, 2019 (aged 89) Miami, Florida, U.S.
- Party: Republican
- Spouse: Mary Fentress
- Children: 3
- Education: University of Chicago
- Occupation: travel agent, investor

Don Jacques Gruber (July 27, 1930 – October 22, 2019) was an American politician in the state of Florida. He served in the Florida Senate from 1972 to 1974, representing the 40th district. Gruber died in Miami on October 29, 2019, at the age of 89.
