= Eduardo González (politician) =

American politician (born 1969)

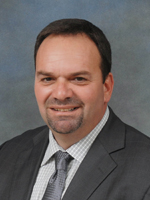

Member of the Florida House of Representatives
- In office November 7, 2006 – November 4, 2014
- Preceded by: Ralph Arza
- Succeeded by: Bryan Avila
- Constituency: 102nd district (2006–2012); 111th district (2012–2014)

Personal details
- Born: November 9, 1969 (age 56) Cárdenas, Cuba
- Party: Republican
- Education: Miami-Dade College
- Profession: Businessman

Eduardo González (born November 9, 1969) is an American politician who was a Republican member of the Florida House of Representatives. He represented the 111th District, which included parts of Miami and Hialeah in northeastern Miami-Dade County, since 2012, previously representing the 102nd District from 2006 to 2012.

== History ==
González was born in Cárdenas, Cuba, and moved to Florida in 1971. He attended Miami-Dade College, studying business management and administration. González was elected to the Hialeah City Council in 1999, and was re-elected in 2001 and 2003.

== Florida House of Representatives ==
In 2006, when incumbent State Representative Ralph Arza resigned from the legislature and ended his re-election campaign because "prosecutors announced they were charging him with witness tampering and retaliation," González was tapped by the Republican Party of Florida to replace him on the ballot in District 102, which included parts of Broward County and most of Hialeah in Miami-Dade County. He faced only write-in opposition in the general election and won in a landslide. González was also re-elected in 2008 and 2010 with only write-in opposition as well.

When the legislative districts were reconfigured in 2012, González was moved into the 111th District, which dropped the Broward County sections of the district and moved south to encompass more of Hialeah and some parts of Miami. In the Republican primary, González was opposed by Miguel Balboa. During the course of the campaign, González sued Balboa and attempted to have him removed from the ballot on the basis that he "illegally coordinated a campaign that included a television ad claiming González had endorsed former Hialeah Mayor Raul Martínez, a Democrat, and a recorded phone call saying González was linked to absentee ballot fraud and was lying about support from Republican U.S. Senator Marco Rubio." Nevertheless, Balboa remained on the ballot, but González beat him in a landslide, winning 62% of the vote. In the general election, González was unopposed and won his final term in the House entirely uncontested.

Representative Gonzalez currently serves as the Chairman of the Miami-Dade County Legislative Delegation, a role he has held since November 2012 until the end of his final term.
