= Allison Tant =

American politician (born 1961)

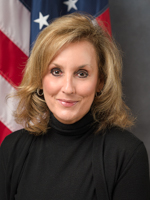

Member of the Florida House of Representatives from the 9th district
- Incumbent
- Assumed office November 3, 2020
- Preceded by: Loranne Ausley

Chair of the Florida Democratic Party
- In office 2014–2016
- Preceded by: Rod Smith
- Succeeded by: Stephen Bittel

Personal details
- Born: 1961 (age 64–65) Jacksonville, Florida, U.S.
- Party: Democratic
- Spouse: Barry Richard
- Children: 3
- Education: Florida State University (BA, BS)

Allison Tant (born 1961) is an American former lobbyist, Democratic Party of Florida chair, and politician serving as a member of the Florida House of Representatives from the 9th district. She assumed office on November 3, 2020.

== Early life and education ==
Tant was born in Jacksonville, Florida. She attended Duncan U. Fletcher High School in Neptune Beach, Florida, graduating in 1979. She earned a Bachelor of Arts degree in communications and a Bachelor of Science in psychology from Florida State University.

== Career ==
Tant has worked as a lobbyist for Holland & Knight and Steel Hector & Davis International. From 2014 to 2016, she served as chair of the Florida Democratic Party. In July, 2016, Tant cast Florida's ballots in the 2016 Democratic National Convention for Hillary Clinton. Tant did not seek re-election as chair after the 2016 United States elections, in which Hillary Clinton lost Florida to Donald Trump and Democrats gained only three seats in the Florida Legislature. In November 2020, Tant was elected to the Florida House of Representatives, succeeding Loranne Ausley.

== Personal life ==
Tant is married to Barry Richard, an attorney and former member of the Florida House of Representatives who was one of several lawyers who represented George W. Bush in Bush v. Gore (2000). Tant and Richard have three children.
