= Michael Gottlieb (politician) =

American politician from Florida

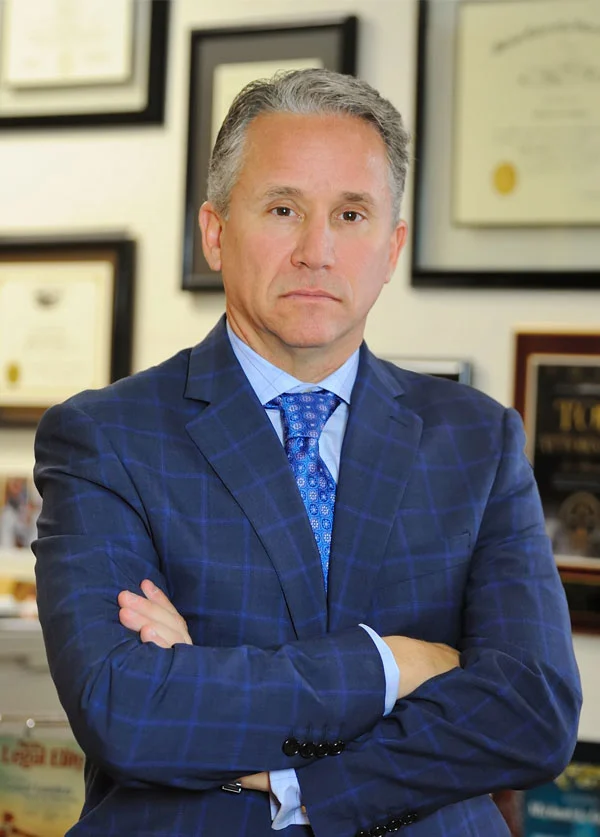

Member of the Florida House of Representatives from the 102nd district
- In office November 6, 2018 – November 3, 2026
- Preceded by: Katie Edwards
- Succeeded by: Michael Friend

Personal details
- Born: November 15, 1968 (age 57) Hollywood, Florida
- Party: Democratic
- Education: George Washington University, Nova Southeastern University
- Occupation: Criminal Defense Attorney
- Website: https://www.browardcriminallawyer.com/

Michael Alan Gottlieb (born November 15, 1968) is an American politician who served as a Democratic member of the Florida House of Representatives, representing the State's 102nd House district.

== Education ==
Gottlieb attended George Washington University, earning a Bachelor of Arts in Political Science in 1990. He then attended Nova Southeastern University for law school, obtaining his JD in 1993.

== Legal career ==
Gottlieb started his legal career as a law clerk with the office of Whitelock, Soloff, Rodriguez, and Williams, P.A., in February 1993. He was with them until August 1993, when he became the law clerk for Hilliard E. Moldof, P.A. He remained at that office until October 1993. He was admitted to the Florida Bar on September 23, 1993. He joined the Broward County Public Defender's Office as an assistant public defender in October 1993. He was with them until October 1996, when he left to start his own practice.

Gottlieb opened his own firm in November 1996 and has continued his criminal defense practice up to the present day.

== Legislative career ==
Gottlieb was elected to the Florida House of Representatives in November 2018, defeating Republican Joseph Cruz 64%–36%. He ran for office again in 2020 and 2022, running unopposed both times. He represented the 98th House district up until 2022, when redistricting transferred him to the 102nd House district.

=== 2019 legislative session ===
Drawn from a concern over the safety of medical law enforcement agents, Gottlieb sponsored HB 487, which permitted tactical medical professionals to carry and use firearms. While acting in his capacity as a criminal defense attorney, he became aware of inmates using vindictive masturbation to harass female prison guards. Gottlieb took action and passed HB 599, which prohibited lewd or lascivious acts in county jails and turned it from a misdemeanor into a felony offense. He also prohibited the production and sales of "child-like sex dolls" with HB 1107.

=== 2020 legislative session ===
Gottlieb sponsored HB 103, which updated the legal definition for being "properly served" with a subpoena and instituted fines for those found to be in noncompliance with a subpoena. After the tragic Parkland high school shooting, he partnered with Lori Alhadeff and her organization Make Our Schools Safe to pass HB 23, which mandated that all public schools implement panic alarms and set aside funding for those alarm systems.

=== 2021 legislative session ===
Ongoing investigations into cases that led to prior convictions used to have their records available to the public. That meant that anyone who had been previously convicted and had a pending case could look up the facts of their case and find witness information. That opened up the possibility for witness tampering through intimidation, threats, or coercion. Gottlieb passed HB 643, which provided a public records exemption for certain ongoing reinvestigations by the state attorney's office.

=== 2022 legislative session ===
In an effort to further protect students, Gottlieb sponsored HB 173, which required schools to provide care for students with epilepsy or seizure disorders. The bill also directed schools to create and implement individualized seizure plans for those students, along with added requirements for training school nurses and other faculty. He also promoted HB 265, which raised the exemption value of motor vehicles in cases of bankruptcy from $1,000 to $5,000. It passed in both the Senate and the House, but was vetoed by the Governor, Ron DeSantis. Gottlieb co-sponsored HB 195, which permitted juveniles who successfully completed a diversion program for a qualifying offense and had their subsequent record expunged to "lawfully deny or fail to acknowledge" that they completed said program or had their record expunged, unless the inquiry was made by a criminal justice agency for a specified purpose.

=== 2023 legislative session ===
Under section 836.12 of the Florida statute, threatening a law enforcement officer, elected official, state attorney, firefighter, judge, or any family member of any such person is a first-degree misdemeanor. Subsequent offenses are elevated to a third-degree felony. Gottlieb sponsored HB 67, which amended s. 836.12, F.S., to include a broader scope of protected individuals, including but not limited to, justices, judicial assistants, clerk of courts, or any family member of any such person.

Following the COVID-19 pandemic, Gottlieb sponsored HB 1571, which authorized the courts to conduct audio-video calls for cases held in juvenile courts, along with support for such online calls.

Gottlieb also sponsored HB 965, which required that motor vehicle registration forms, along with other identification forms, contained an option to make a voluntary contribution to Best Buddies International.

=== 2024 legislative session ===
Gottlieb sponsored HB 187, which established Florida as following the controversial IHRA definition of antisemitism. As such the bill expands conduct considered antisemitic including specific categories of criticism of the state of Israel. The bill was signed into law in June. He also sponsored HB 8045, a bi-partisan bill to designate February 29, 2024, as "Israel Day at the Capitol".

Previously, in the state of Florida, if a person had a restraining order or was a victim of domestic violence, they would need to carry around a stack of papers to prove the validity of their claims if and when an issue arose, such as a person approaching someone with a restraining order on them. Gottlieb enacted HB 45, which created, implemented, and provided "Hope Cards" to people who had received a final injunction regarding domestic abuse or similar violent crimes.

=== 2026 legislative session ===
Gottlieb is a cosponsor of the newly formed State Legislator Israel Caucus (SLIC), a nonprofit with the stated purpose of establishing a countrywide system to distribute to state lawmakers pro-Israel “model legislation". When interviewed on future goals of SLIC, Gottlieb expressed support for statewide sharing of model legislation concerning Sharia law bans and mandating referring to the West Bank of Palestine by the Israeli term "Judea and Samaria". In August 2026, Gottlieb complained on social media about a rally involving Rashida Tlaib at The Venue Fort Lauderdale, which led to the event's cancelation.
