= Edmond Gong =

American politician

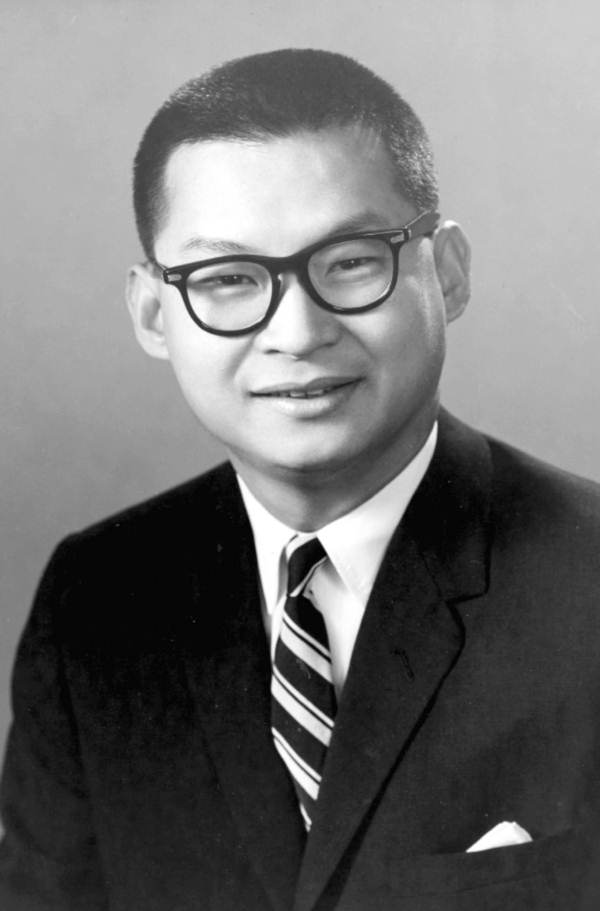

Member of the Florida Senate from the 40th district
- In office November 8, 1966 – November 7, 1972
- Preceded by: Redistricted
- Succeeded by: Don Gruber

Member of the Florida House of Representatives
- In office 1963–1966
- Succeeded by: Sandy D'Alemberte

Personal details
- Born: October 7, 1930 Miami, Florida, U.S.
- Died: May 19, 2015 (aged 84) Miami, Florida, U.S.
- Party: Democratic
- Spouse(s): Sophie (deceased); Dana
- Children: Peter (d. 1978), Frances, Madeleine, Joe and E. J. Gong
- Education: Harvard University; University of Miami School of Law
- Occupation: attorney
- Profession: politician

Edmond Joseph Gong (October 7, 1930 – May 19, 2015) was an American attorney and politician in the state of Florida. He was the first Asian American elected to the Florida House of Representatives.

Gong was born in Miami to Chinese immigrant parents, who worked as grocers ultimately creating a chain of mom-and-pop grocery stores in the Overtown section of Miami. An attorney, he was an alumnus of Harvard University and the University of Miami School of Law. As a member of the Democratic party he was elected to the Florida House of Representatives from 1963 to 1966 and was elected to the State Senate in 1966 and served until 1972.

== Early life and family ==
In 1915, at the age of 15, Gong's father immigrated to the U.S. going to Tifton, Georgia to work in his father's laundry. He returned to China to marry in 1925. Gong stated, "as Daddy used to say, the soil was getting pretty barren and not so productive, and they all wanted to come to the 'golden mountain' that was the name for America." Gong's father was politically conscious and voted in every election. It was this spirit and his father's encouragement that led Eddie and his four sisters to be politically active in high school. At Miami High School, Gong was elected president of the student body. In 1947 he was elected to Boys State and in the same year became president of Boys Nation.

Gong won a scholarship to Harvard University from the Harvard Club of Miami and graduated cum laude in political science in 1952. With his father's guidance Eddie and his four sisters were encouraged to become well rounded students. His four sisters would go on to all graduate from college, the first in their family. Two of the sisters became physicians. They all supported Eddie in his law school career. He graduated from the University of Miami School of Law in 1960. Eddie said of his father, "he believed in education because he didn't have one". At Harvard, he made a life long friend, Ji Chaozhu who became Ambassador from China to the UK along with other diplomatic posts. Eddie always believed they had led parallel lives after Ji left Harvard at the founding of the PRC on October 1, 1949.

== Early career ==
Following college Gong moved to Hong Kong working as a journalist at the Hong Kong Tiger Standard. While there he met and married Sophie Vlachos. Deciding on a career in law, Gong moved back to the United States where he worked as a reporter at the Miami Herald while attending the University of Miami School of Law. Gong graduated in 1960.

After a short time in private practice he met then Attorney General Robert F. Kennedy who offered him a position with the Justice Department in Washington. Gong turned him down citing a desire not to be separated from his family. Kennedy then appointed him assistant U.S. attorney which allowed him to remain in Miami.

== Florida Politics ==
During the 1960s Gong's name became well known and his passion for public service coincided with Florida's reapportionment which created new seats in the Legislature. He filed to run for state Representative and was elected in 1963. Gong was called “one of Dade County’s most popular politicians.”

In 1947 he met two fellow participants at Florida's Boys State, William "Wig" D. Barrow and Lawton Chiles. All three were elected to the Florida Senate in 1966. Chiles went on to represent Florida in the U.S. Senate (1970-1989) and serve as Governor (1991-1998). Gong and Chiles maintained a lifelong friendship.

In 1963 Gong was the first man of Chinese ancestry elected to the Florida House of Representatives where he served until 1966 when he ran and was elected to the Florida Senate. Gong and Chiles worked on what is now known in Florida's Government as the Sunshine Law.

He 1971 served as Associate Director of the Institute of Politics at John Fitzgerald Kennedy School of Government, Harvard University.

In describing a summary of his political life, he said," That's what American does. I mean, here we had the grocery store in the black ghetto--that's what you would call it," he said. " It could only happen in America. My father, my grandfather, all had to come half way around the globe for us to have a chance because we wouldn't have had this chance. We'd have been working in the rice paddies in China."

== Death ==
Gong died in Miami on May 19, 2015.
