= Michael Friend (Florida politician) =

American politician

Member of the Florida House of Representatives from the 102nd district
- Incumbent
- Assumed office November 3, 2026
- Preceded by: Michael Gottlieb

Personal details
- Born: June 19, 1976 (age 50)
- Party: Democratic
- Website: Campaign website

Michael (Mike) J. Friend (born June 19, 1976) is a dentist and state legislator in Florida. A member of the Democratic Party, he has served in the Florida House of Representatives since 2026, representing the 102nd district. He was elected in the 2026 election. He is a dentist by profession.

He is a dentist. He is married and has three children.
