= Dick Renick =

American politician

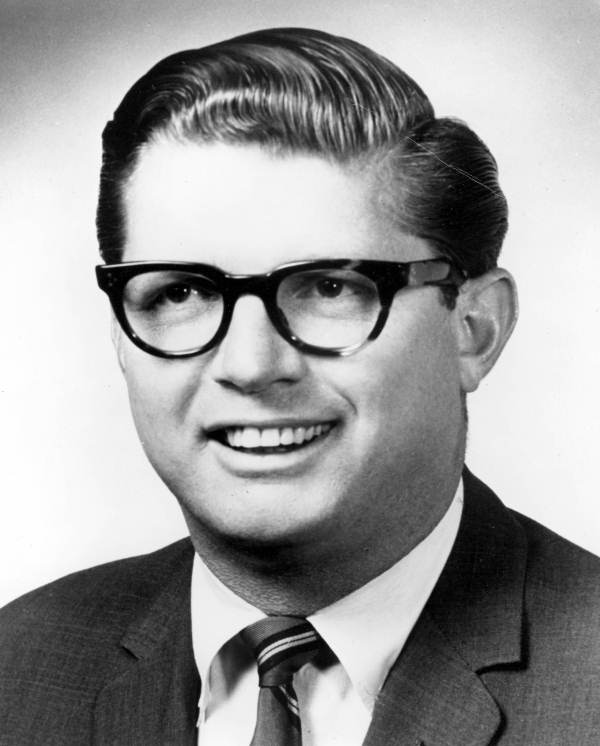

Member of the Florida Senate from the 39th district
- In office November 4, 1980 – November 2, 1982
- Preceded by: Vernon Holloway
- Succeeded by: Larry Plummer

Member of the Florida Senate from the 40th district
- In office November 5, 1974 – November 7, 1978
- Preceded by: Don Gruber
- Succeeded by: Dick Anderson

Member of the Florida House of Representatives
- In office 1966–1972
- Constituency: 92nd district (1968–72); Dade (1966–67)

Personal details
- Born: October 14, 1930 Crestwood, Yonkers, New York
- Died: January 31, 2022 (aged 91)
- Party: Republican
- Spouse: Valerie Renick
- Relations: Ralph Renick (brother)
- Education: University of Miami
- Occupation: Cinematographer, film/television director

Military service
- Allegiance: United States
- Branch/service: United States Navy

Richard R. Renick (October 14, 1930 – January 31, 2022) was an American politician in the state of Florida.

== Early life and education ==
Renick was born in New York and moved to Florida in 1940. He attended St. Mary's High School in Miami and the University of Miami.

== Career ==
Renick served in the United States Navy for three years and was assigned to the USS Conserver from 1947 to 1949 at Naval Station Pearl Harbor and the Aleutian Islands in Alaska. He served in the Florida House of Representatives from 1966 to 1972, as a Democrat, and the Florida State Senate from 1975 to 1982. He was a cinematographer, television and film director. His brother was Ralph Renick, a television journalist.

== Death ==
Renick died on January 31, 2022, at the age of 91.
