= Luis Rojas (Florida politician) =

American politician (born 1953)

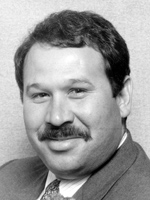

Member of the Florida House of Representatives
- In office November 8, 1988 – November 7, 2000
- Preceded by: Rudy García
- Succeeded by: Ralph Arza
- Constituency: 109th District (1988–1992); 102nd District (1992–2000)

Personal details
- Born: July 15, 1953 (age 73) Havana, Cuba
- Party: Republican
- Children: Jason P., Michelle N., Christina M.
- Education: Miami Dade College (A.A.); Florida International University (B.A.); Shepard Broad College of Law (J.D.)
- Occupation: Attorney

Luis Rojas (born July 15, 1953) is a Republican politician and attorney who served as a member of the Florida House of Representatives from 1988 to 2000.

== Early life and career ==
Rojas was born in Havana, Cuba, and moved to Florida in 1959. He attended Miami-Dade Community College, receiving his associate degree in 1972, and then Florida International University, graduating with his bachelor's degree in 1974. He taught U.S. history at Miami Springs Junior High School and then at Riverview High School in Sarasota. He then attended the Shepard Broad College of Law, graduating in 1982 with his juris doctor.

== Florida House of Representatives ==
In 1986, Republican State Representative Ileana Ros-Lehtinen announced that she would run for the State Senate rather than seek re-election. Rojas ran to succeed her in the 110th district. He faced a crowded Republican primary, and lost to attorney Lincoln Díaz-Balart in a landslide, receiving 10 percent of the vote to Díaz-Balart's 51 percent.

Two years later, in 1988, Republican State Representative Rudy García opted to run for the State Senate rather than seek re-election. Rojas ran to succeed him in the 109th district, and faced legal secretary Christina MacKenzie-Marañon and contractor Gus Perez. In the primary, Rojas placed first with 41 percent, but because he did not receive a majority, he advanced to a runoff election with MacKenzie-Marañon, who placed second with 34 percent. Rojas ultimately won the runoff and advanced to the general election against Irene Secada, the Democratic nominee. Rojas defeated Secada in a landslide, winning 65 percent of the vote.

Rojas was re-elected without opposition in 1990.

In 1992, following the reconfiguration of the state's legislative districts after the 1990 Census, Rojas opted to run for re-election in the 102nd district, which extended from Hialeah to Naples in Collier County. He was challenged in the Republican primary by Gus Perez, a real estate appraiser who ran against him in the 1988 primary. Rojas won the primary in a landslide, receiving 69 percent of the vote to Perez's 31 percent, and was unopposed in the general election.

Rojas ran for re-election in 1994 and was challenged in the Republican primary by William Greene, a political science instructor at Florida International University. Rojas easily won the Republican primary, receiving 76 percent of the vote to Greene's 24 percent. He was re-elected unopposed in 1996 and 1998.

== Post-legislative career ==
In 2000, Rojas was term-limited and unable to run for re-election. Instead, he ran for the State Senate to succeed Roberto Casas. He faced fellow State Representative Rudy García and Hialeah City Council President Alex Morales in the Republican primary. Rojas was endorsed by the Díaz de la Portilla family, including State Senator Alex Díaz de la Portilla and County Commissioner Miguel Díaz de la Portilla, while García was supported by County Mayor Alex Penelas. García won the nomination in a landslide, receiving 56 percent of the vote to Morales's 32 percent and Rojas's 12 percent.
