= Robert R. Reynolds (Florida politician) =

American politician

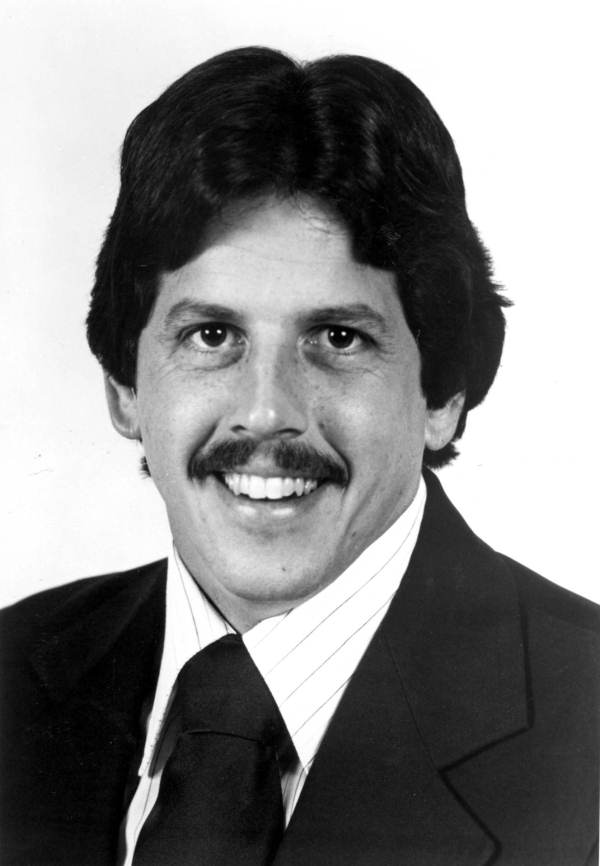
- Reynolds in 1978

Member of the Florida House of Representatives from the 108th district
- In office 1978–1982
- Preceded by: John Hill
- Succeeded by: Willie Logan

Member of the Florida House of Representatives from the 109th district
- In office 1982–1984
- Preceded by: John Cosgrove
- Succeeded by: Rudy García

Personal details
- Born: January 14, 1949 (age 77) Miami, Florida, U.S.
- Party: Democratic
- Education: Miami Dade Junior College; Illinois State University

Robert R. Reynolds (born January 14, 1949) is an American politician. He served as a Democratic member for the 108th and 109th district of the Florida House of Representatives.

== Life and career ==
Reynolds was born in Miami, Florida. He attended Miami Dade Junior College and Illinois State University.

In 1978, Reynolds was elected to represent the 108th district of the Florida House of Representatives, succeeding John A. Hill. He served until 1982, when he was succeeded by Willie Logan Jr. In the same year, he was elected to represent the 109th district, succeeding John Cosgrove. He served until 1984, when he was succeeded by Rudy García.
