= Hayward Davis =

American politician

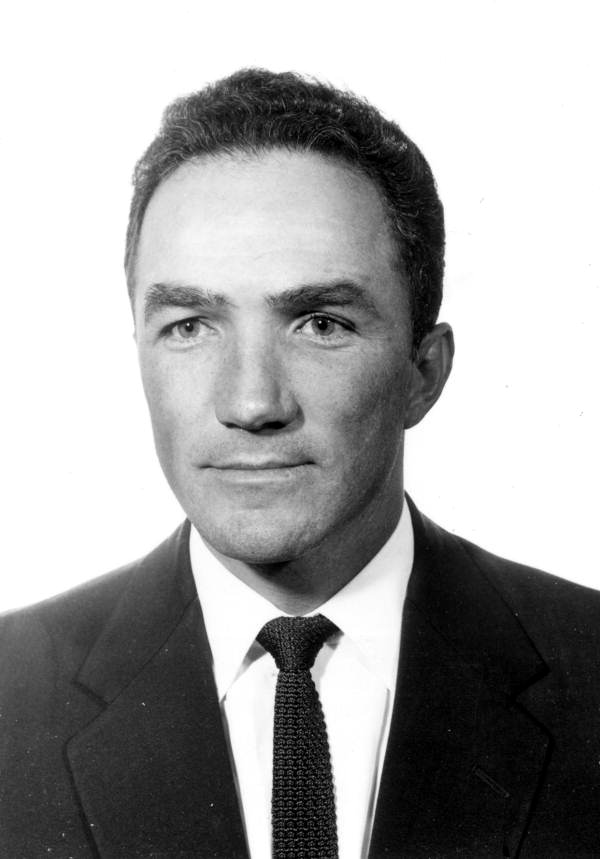
- Davis in 1963

Member of the Florida Senate from the 40th district
- In office 1963–1967

Personal details
- Born: August 23, 1928 Clewiston, Florida, U.S.
- Died: October 20, 2014 (aged 86)
- Party: Democratic
- Education: University of Florida Levin College of Law

Hayward H. Davis (August 23, 1928 – October 20, 2014) was an American politician. He served as a Democratic member of the Florida Senate.

== Life and career ==
Davis was born in Clewiston, Florida. He attended the University of Florida Levin College of Law.

Davis was a Lake Placid attorney.

Davis served in the Florida Senate from 1963 to 1967.

Davis died on October 20, 2014, at the age of 86.
