= Dotie Joseph =

American politician from Florida

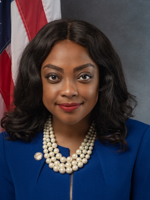

Member of the Florida House of Representatives from the 108th district
- In office November 6, 2018 – November 3, 2026
- Preceded by: Roy Hardemon
- Succeeded by: Daphne Campbell

Personal details
- Born: August 21, 1980 (age 46) Haiti
- Party: Democratic
- Education: Yale University (BA); Georgetown University (JD)

Dotie Joseph is an attorney, community advocate, artist, and former Democratic member of the Florida Legislature representing the State's 108th House district, serving four full terms from 2018 - 2026. As Democratic Minority Leader Pro Tempore, Representative became the first Haitian-American to serve in a legislative leadership capacity (i.e. as Speaker, Minority Leader, or Pro Tempore) in the United States. Joseph was born in Haiti and raised in Miami.

== Education ==
Dotie Joseph attended Miami-Dade public schools—including Lakeview Elementary, fine arts magnet programs at and Charles Drew Elementary and Miami Norland Middle School, and studied fashion design at Design and Architecture Senior High (DASH). Joseph went on to graduate from Yale University with a degree in Political Sciences, earned a Juris Doctor from Georgetown University Law Center. Joseph studied abroad in France with Columbia University in Paris, and with the Institute for International Mediation and Conflict Resolution (IIMCR) in The Hague in the Netherlands.

== Career ==
Joseph has worked as a federal judicial law clerk, legal consultant, a government and civil rights lawyer in the public and private sector. She is currently an attorney with Ottinot Law, an all-black law firm which specializes in complex government and business matters.

Joseph won the election for Florida's House of Representatives on November 6, 2018, from the platform of Democratic Party. She secured 92% of the vote, while her closest rival secured 8% for the Libertarian Party of Florida.

In 2022, Representative Joseph was selected to serve as Minority Leader Pro Tempore, becoming the first Haitian-American to hold a leadership position of Speaker, Leader or Pro Tempore position in any state or federal legislative body in the United States. Joseph was elected to her fourth term in 2024 without opposition.

Afrer Mayor Jerry Demings exited the Democratic Primary in June to address health concerns, Joseph entered the 2026 Florida gubernatorial election. While she received a lot of support and momentum as a progressive champion in lead up to the August Primary Election, Joseph did not win the party's nomination.
