= Demetrio Perez Jr. =

American politician (1945–2023)

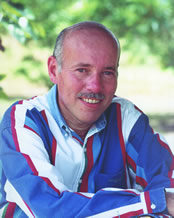

Demetrio Alberto Pérez Jr. (August 7, 1945 – March 10, 2023) was a Cuban-American educator, politician, radio commentator, entrepreneur and publisher of LIBRE, a bilingual weekly newspaper, and the founder of the Lincoln-Marti private educational group. Demetrio also gave daily educational commentaries which were broadcast on WAQI 710-AM where he also hosted a talk-show each Saturday afternoon at 3:00p.m.

Perez published a character education textbook and has written extensively on educational and political issues. His last book is a compilation of significant events that occurred on each day of the year.

== Biography ==
Perez was born in Matanzas on August 7, 1945. His parents were Demetrio Pérez Arencibia (died April 5, 1988) and María de los Angeles Jorcano y Grande (died December 27, 1992).

On June 3, 1962, aged 16, Perez migrated to Miami as part of Operation Pedro Pan during which thousands of Cuban children left their homeland.

After having worked at various jobs available to immigrants (delivering newspapers, cutting grass, selling doughnuts on street corners, picking tomatoes, etc.), Perez attended Miami Edison Senior High School. His first formal job was at the AIP news agency.

His performance at the university level earned him the distinction of being selected to appear in "Who's Who Among Students in American Colleges and Universities".

On February 14, 1964, Perez managed to arrange for his parents' departure to Mexico City. They stayed in Mexico City until April 5 of that year, when they were reunited in Miami.

Perez earned a Bachelor's in Education and a Master of Science in Human Resources with a specialization in exceptional children. His father revalidated his degree and earned another bachelor's degree in education at Biscayne College. In 1968 they established the first Lincoln-Marti School.

Perez died on March 10, 2023, at the age of 77.

== Politics ==
From 1981 to 1985, Perez served as member of the Miami City Commission. During that tenure he also served as Vice-Mayor of the city.

In 1996 he was elected as a member of the Miami-Dade County School Board, representing District 5. During his first two years on the Board, he served as its vice-chair after having won more than 72% of the vote in the November 1996 general election and was reelected, without opposition, in November 2000.

Perez also served as President of the Interamerican Center for Municipal Cooperation (CENICOM) for which he organized three summits that were held in Miami and included the participation of thousands of municipalities from the Americas. This annual convention was a first-of-its-kind event in Miami.

Perez was also a member of numerous civic, patriotic and cultural organizations and boards.

In his time on the school board, he led an educational crusade called "Dade Educational Challenge '96." Among Demetrio's main achievements are:

- Mandatory school uniforms
- School safety
- Creating a closed lunch policy in Miami-Dade's public schools
- Recognition of Hispanic contributions to the history of the United States through the "Legacy" curriculum
- Air conditioning on public school buses
- Inspirational calendar

In 2002, Perez pleaded guilty to felony charges of defrauding three elderly tenants in low-income Little Havana apartments that he owned. The original indictment alleged that Perez operated a scheme to defraud the Section 8 program of the U.S. Department of Housing and Urban Development, and charged him with mail fraud, conspiracy to commit mail fraud, and making false statements on federal forms. As part of a plea bargain with prosecutors, Perez was subsequently sentenced to six months of house arrest and 18 months of probation. The convicted felon has continued to be investigated for additional issues through 2020.

== Other initiatives ==
LIBRE newspaper, which was founded in 1966, is published weekly, 52 times per year. The print edition has 64 pages and there is also an online edition at www.libreonline.com that has up-to-the-minute coverage of news and current events. It was distributed together with the Miami Nuevo Herald as a paid advertising insert. On September 14, 2020, the Herald ended all business relations with Libre after multiple instances of anti-Semitic and racist commentary in the supplement that the newspaper hadn't been aware of.

Perez's daily radio commentaries, in addition to being broadcast on the radio, are distributed free via e-mail to thousands of subscribers. There is also www.lincolnmarti.tv that broadcasts information about the schools and community events. He also organized the yearly banquet for the citizens of the Province of Matanzas in Cuba, bringing together the members of his hometown and their families and descendants during November of each year. He also directed the annual Jose Marti Parade which brings together children from public and private schools in Miami-Dade to honor the legacy of Jose Marti. As part of this event he sponsored a poetry contest.
