= Lincoln-Marti Schools =

Schools in Florida, United States

Coordinates: 25.7641°N 80.2388°W

Lincoln Marti Schools is a chain of schools in Florida owned by Demetrio Perez Jr. The schools were established by three of his friends.
