= Roy Hardemon =

American politician (1962–2025)

Member of the Florida House of Representatives from the 108th district
- In office November 8, 2016 – November 7, 2018
- Preceded by: Daphne Campbell
- Succeeded by: Dotie Joseph

Personal details
- Born: August 12, 1962 Miami, Florida, U.S.
- Died: November 12, 2025 (aged 63)
- Party: Democratic

Roy Hardemon (August 12, 1962 – November 12, 2025) was an American politician who served in the Florida House of Representatives from the 108th district from 2016 to 2018.

Hardemon died on November 12, 2025, at the age of 63.
