= List of killings by law enforcement officers in the United States, January 2017 =

This is a list of people reported killed by non-military law enforcement officers in the United States in January 2017, whether in the line of duty or not, and regardless of reason or method. The listing documents the occurrence of a death, making no implications regarding wrongdoing or justification on the part of the person killed or officer involved. Killings are arranged by date of the incident that caused death. Different death dates, if known, are noted in the description. The table below lists 102 people.

== January 2017 ==
Date	Name (age) of the deceased	State (city)	Description
2017-01-31	Picart, Solomon (37)	California (Los Angeles)	LAPD officers shot a man at Sunset Boulevard, who had stabbed a cyclist, a man at a Jack in the Box restaurant, and another person. Before the man went to the restaurant, he attempted to enter a coffee shop. However, the employees blocked the door to prevent him from entering. Finally, the officers confronted the man and attempted to use a taser on him. As the man kept going after being tased, he was shot an unknown number of times and died at the scene. No body camera footage is available, although there is surveillance footage.
2017-01-31	Thompson, James (44)	Georgia (LaGrange)	
2017-01-30	Dowell, Jeremy (36)	Washington (Lynnwood)	Dowell became agitated while in a local store. He then pulled a knife and began running into and out of highway traffic. He approached responding officers while wielding the knife, at which point he was shot dead.
2017-01-30	Herckt, Spencer (42)	California (Modesto)	
2017-01-30	Washington, Marvin (50)	Oklahoma (Klowa)	
2017-01-30	Alvarez, Refugio (45)	California (Fresno)	
2017-01-29	Thomas, Val (27)	Connecticut (Montville)	Thomas was shot dead after stealing an officer's taser and trying to tase her with it. He then hit the officer with the taser, who shot and killed him.
2017-01-29	Salgado, Steve (18)	California (Santa Ana)	
2017-01-28	Dunlap-Gittens, Mi'Chance (17)	Washington (Des Moines)	Police lured Dunlap-Gittens and a friend, who was a person of interest in a homicide, out of an apartment by pretending to be underage teens wanting to buy alcohol. When officers announced themselves, they say Dunlap-Gittens removed a gun from his waistband and raised it at them, at which point police opened fire. Dunlap-Gittens then ran from the police, who continued to fire on him until he was dead.
2017-01-28	Szakacs, Bradley (45)	Arizona (Apache Junction)	
2017-01-28	Zank, Matthew (49)	Wisconsin (Eau Claire)	
2017-01-28	Coronado, Gerardo (25)	Texas (Fort Stockton)	
2017-01-27	Hernandez, Eduardo (25)	California (Alhambra)	
2017-01-26	Coomer, Kerry (59)	Maryland (Baltimore)	
2017-01-26	Phillips, Deaundre (24)	Georgia (Atlanta)	
2017-01-26	Brigham, William (34)	Ohio (Groveport)	
2017-01-26	Diaz, Josue (28)	North Carolina (Charlotte)	
2017-01-25	Washington, Kevin (54)	Mississippi (Southaven)	
2017-01-25	Scheurich, Donovan (50)	Wisconsin (Millston)	
2017-01-25	Lambert, Micah (37)	Alabama (Oxford)	
2017-01-24	Lukecart, Dakota (22)	Missouri (Kansas City)	
2017-01-24	Milanez, Ramon (32)	Idaho (Kuna)	
2017-01-24	Manning, Arties (26)	Louisiana (New Orleans)	
2017-01-24	Perez Garcia, Antonio (27)	California (Bakersfield)	
2017-01-24	Rodriguez, Jose (18)	Pennsylvania (Lancaster)	
2017-01-24	Sper, Jonathan (30)	Michigan (Rockford)	
2017-01-24	Jones, Sabin (45)	Virginia (South Hill)	
2017-01-24	Lopez-Robledo, Jeremy (29)	New Mexico (Las Cruces)	
2017-01-24	Gallardo, Josue (34)	California (Atascardero)	
2017-01-23	Ramos, Angel (21)	California (Vallejo)	Officer Zach Jacobsen shot and killed Ramos, who police said was armed with a knife during a domestic fight at a large party shortly before 12:45 a.m., on the 1700 block of Sacramento Street. Police said Ramos presented “an immediate and lethal threat” to a 16-year-old who police said was down on his back. Police said Ramos was shot four times and died at the scene. Officer Jacobsen was cleared by the DA in a February 2018 report.
2017-01-23	Rogers, Daniel (27)	Illinois (Springfield)	
2017-01-23	Wigley, Gary (52)	Georgia (Brooklet)	
2017-01-23	Klein, Tereance (57)	Missouri (St. Louis)	
2017-01-23	Altenburger, Bruce (60)	Delaware (Wilmington)	
2017-01-23	Brown, Armond (25)	Louisiana (Kenner)	
2017-01-22	Thompkins, Christopher Mark (57)	Pennsylvania (Pittsburgh)	In the Larimer neighborhood of Pittsburgh, Pennsylvania, police were responding to a burglar alarm coming from a property located at 129 Finley St. Thompkins, who was the owner of the house, was chasing after an alleged intruder because he was worried about his 78-year-old mother. His mother was blind and used a wheelchair. Brenda Richmond, Thompkins' ex-wife, fled from the bedroom, where the intruder was reportedly first located, via a second-story window while calling 911. Later, Thompkins went downstairs to a landing and fired two shots while he was on the stairs. This caused officers to radio in a "Code 3- Shots fired" call. Shortly thereafter, the police fired at Thompkins from the front porch, killing him. The police then found Juan Brian Jeter-Clark (23) in Thompkins' living room. He was subsequently identified as the "intruder" and was arrested for criminal trespass.
2017-01-22	Victor, Jorge (30)	California (Carson)	
2017-01-22	Alspaugh, Jon (57)	Maine (Waldoboro)	
2017-01-21	Shorter, Ronnie (44)	Mississippi (Greenville)	
2017-01-21	Palmer, Paul (57)	Nevada (Jean)	
2017-01-20	Jones, Joshua (20)	Illinois (Chicago)	
2017-01-20	Palazzolo, Gino (39)	Florida (Gainesville)	
2017-01-19	Smith, Elijah (25)	Missouri (Florissant)	
2017-01-19	Fisher, William (49)	Virginia (Woodford)	
2017-01-18	Rodas-Sanchez, Marlon (16)	California (Salinas)	Rodas-Sanchez, an El Salvador-born male, was shot and killed by officers Manuel Lopez and Jared Dominici, with seven shots fired from Lopez's AR-15 and two shots fired by Dominici. Rodas-Sanchez was armed with a knife and was reportedly acting erratically at a house, leading to a total of fourteen officers being deployed to the scene. Initially, Rodas-Sanchez was shot with rubber bullets and sprayed with a fire hose, but allegedly charged at Lopez with a knife. In July 2017, the Monterey County's district attorney's office ruled the shooting to be justified and that no criminal charges would be filed against the officers involved. An autopsy showed that Rodas-Sanchez had a potentially toxic amount of methamphetamine in his system, and housemates claimed that Rodas-Sanchez told them that he was hallucinating before the shooting.
2017-01-19	Garza, Christopher (44)	Texas (Fritch)	
2017-01-18	DeLong, Melvin (28)	North Dakota (Belcourt)	
2017-01-18	McJunkin, Stoney (40)	Oklahoma (Watts)	
2017-01-18	Thomas, Marquis (19)	Indiana (Gary)	
2017-01-18	Dawes, Genevive (21)	Texas (Dallas)	
2017-01-18	Stroughter, David (50)	California (Los Angeles)	
2017-01-17	Garcia, Rudy Joseph (46)	Texas (Little Elm)	Jerry Walker, a detective belonging to the Little Elm Police Department, was responding to a report of a man armed with a rifle outside of a home as part of a sniper team supporting the Little Elm Police Department SWAT team. Initially, police officers responded to a 911 call made by a neighbor of Garcia about him threatening the neighbor and his co-worker with the rifle. When they discovered Garcia in the backyard, he began shouting at the officers, which caused them to take a defensive position. After this, he barricaded himself inside the house and a perimeter was set up by police with SWAT being activated to assist in negotiating Garcia into surrendering. Walker and another patrol officer set up a position on an intersection between Waterview Drive and Turtle Cove Drive, the latter being the location where Garcia barricaded himself. He then radioed Little Elm Police Chief, Rodney Harrison, to report that a bullet was fired somewhere on the intersection from 50 yards away. Harrison asked Walker to confirm the origin of the gunshot and the latter replied that he and the patrol officer were being fired upon. Just moments later, Harrison stated that a "hail of gunfire came from inside the residence in the direction of Detective Walker and our patrol officer," Two other officers shot back at Garcia, which led to the gunfire lasting for a total of about one minute. Walker was flown to the Denton Regional Medical Center, where he succumbed to his injuries. Deputies from the Denton County Sheriff's Office and police officers from the Frisco Police Department were dispatched to back up the other officers. An elderly woman that was also in the residence with Garcia was rescued by being escorted from the rear sides of the home. Police believe that the woman is the grandmother of Garcia. A robot was then used to scout the building, leading to the discovery of Garcia's body. The exact cause of his death has not been revealed. The standoff lasted for a total of 6 hours.
2017-01-17	Hodges, Dominic (39)	California (Twentynine Palms)	
2017-01-17	Sexton, Christopher (29)	Tennessee (Soddy Daisy)	
2017-01-16	Doudzai, Mohammad Azim (32)	Virginia (Herndon)	Police say Doudzai wounded two men with gunshots before setting a fire in the home and barricading himself inside with a hostage. Police shot him when he came out of the home wielding a knife.
2017-01-16	McClure, Charles (43)	Kentucky (Fulton)	
2017-01-16	Carroll, David (36)	Georgia (Sharpsburg)	
2017-01-15	Anderson, Eric (48)	California (Azusa)	
2017-01-15	Pream, Sinuon (37)	California (Long Beach)	
2017-01-15	Johnson, Herbert (34)	Illinois (Chicago)	
2017-01-15	Dumarce, Dexter (33)	Washington (Spokane)	
2017-01-14	Gilpin, Scott (47)	Texas (Austin)	
2017-01-14	Nicholson, Jahlire (28)	New York (Jamaica)	
2017-01-13	Johnson, Cameron (29)	Hawaii (Laie)	
2017-01-12	Hoback, Rodney (26)	Virginia (Pearisburg)	
2017-01-12	Tree, Kevin (54)	Florida (Ocala)	
2017-01-12	Anderson, Jamison (20)	Minnesota (Onamia)	
2017-01-11	Johnson, Ronald (41)	Minnesota (Austin)	
2017-01-11	Fernandez Ventura, Jose (38)	New Jersey (Camden)	
2017-01-11	Abousamra, Hafez (41)	California (Lake Elsinore)	
2017-01-11	Rogers, Michael (32)	California (Los Angeles)	
2017-01-11	Barnhill, Darrion (23)	Tennessee (Reagan)	
2017-01-09	Arreola, Hector (30)	Georgia (Columbus)	Arreola called police twice for help while under the influence of meth. A police officer sat on Arreola for over two minutes, killing him.
2017-01-09	Williams, JR (38)	Arizona (Phoenix)	
2017-01-09	Henderson, Davion (21)	Missouri (St. Louis)	
2017-01-08	Aldridge, Jason (44)	Georgia (Cumming)	
2017-01-07	Mathis, William Tucker (41)	Maryland (Elkridge)	Mathis was shot by Howard County police after he broke into his estranged wife's house and fought with arriving officers.
2017-01-07	Giberson, Daniel (25)	West Virginia (Princeton)	Giberson was shot by police after a car chase. He was holding a knife.
2017-01-07	Baker, Travis (42)	Oklahoma (Fairland)	
2017-01-07	Lovato, Gilbert (38)	New Mexico (Albuquerque)	
2017-01-07	Cruz, Carlos (50)	Missouri (Independence)	
2017-01-07	Navarrete, Hector (31)	Colorado (Northglenn)	
2017-01-06	Hake, Sean Ryan (23)	Pennsylvania (Sharon)	Hake, a white 23-year old transgender man, was shot and killed by police in his home. His mother had called 911 to report her son was acting violent and suicidal.
2017-01-06	Moore, Sean (43)	California (San Francisco)	Responding to a stabbing, an officer shot Moore after he knocked another officer down a flight of stairs. Moore was unarmed at the time. Moore died in 2020 while in jail for unrelated charges, and an autopsy ruled his death a homicide based on the shooting. The officer who shot him was later charged with manslaughter.
2017-01-06	Parks, Jamal (32)	Illinois (Deerfield)	
2017-01-05	Vargas, Luis (20)	California (Dinuba)	
2017-01-05	Cole, Randy (41)	Tennessee (Sewanee)	
2017-01-04	Muhayamin, Muhammad (43)	Arizona (Phoenix)	The manager of a public bathroom called police on Muhayamin after he tried to bring his support dog into the bathroom. Officers arrived and allowed Muhayamin to use the bathroom, but discovered he had a warrant for failure to appear in court over possession of a marijuana pipe. After Muhayamin left the bathroom, officers pinned him to the ground. Muhayamin died within eight minutes. During his arrest, Muhayamin stated "I can't breathe."
2017-01-04	Martino, Joshua (18)	New York (Brooklyn)	
2017-01-04	Jackson, Richard (45)	Indiana	
2017-01-04	Dove, Joshua (35)	Florida (St. Petersburg)	
2017-01-04	Mullins, Welby (64)	Kentucky (Lancaster)	
2017-01-04	Randolph, Ruben (51)	California (Pomona)	
2017-01-03	Hightower, Dale (53)	Texas (Gilmer)	
2017-01-03	Owens, James (63)	New York (Brooklyn)	
2017-01-02	Johnson, Trevon (17)	Illinois (Villa Park)	Johnson was shot by Villa Park Police after he fought with his family members.
2017-01-02	Nieves, Jose (38)	Illinois (Chicago)	Nieves was unarmed when he was shot by an off-duty Chicago police officer during a verbal altercation.
2017-01-01	Cuadra, Juan Carlos (23)	Texas (Houston)	
2017-01-01	Lewis, James (44)	Missouri (Springfield)	
2017-01-01	Guirguis, Mark (21)	Texas (Allen)	
2017-01-01	McLaughlin, John (42)	Ohio (Cincinnati)	
2017-01-01	Roberts, Chad (35)	Georgia (Kennesaw)	

== See also ==
- Death in custody § United States
- Henry A. Wallace Police Crime Public Database
- List of cases of police brutality
- List of countries with annual rates and counts for killings by law enforcement officers
- List of law enforcement officers killed in the line of duty in the United States
- List of law enforcement officers convicted for an on-duty killing in the United States
- List of shootings by US immigration agents
- List of police reforms related to the George Floyd protests
- List of unarmed African Americans killed by law enforcement officers in the United States
- Lists of killings by law enforcement officers
- Police brutality in the United States
- Police misconduct § United States
- Police riot § United States
- Police use of deadly force in the United States
