= Rudy García (Florida politician) =

American politician (born 1963)

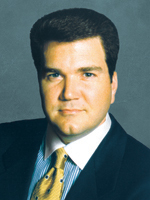

Member of the Florida Senate from the 40th district
- In office November 5, 2002 – November 2, 2010
- Preceded by: Daryl Jones
- Succeeded by: René García

Member of the Florida Senate from the 39th district
- In office November 7, 2000 – November 5, 2002
- Preceded by: Roberto Casas
- Succeeded by: Larcenia Bullard

Member of the Florida House of Representatives from the 110th district
- In office November 3, 1992 – November 7, 2000
- Preceded by: Miguel De Grandy
- Succeeded by: René García

Member of the Florida House of Representatives from the 111th district
- In office November 7, 1989 – November 3, 1992
- Preceded by: Nilo Juri
- Succeeded by: Carlos L. Valdes

Member of the Florida House of Representatives from the 109th district
- In office November 6, 1984 – November 8, 1988
- Preceded by: Robert Reynolds
- Succeeded by: Luis Rojas

Personal details
- Born: April 15, 1963 (age 63) Miami, Florida, U.S.
- Party: Republican
- Spouse: Zuly García
- Occupation: businessman

Rodolfo "Rudy" García (born April 15, 1963) is a former Republican member of the Florida Senate, representing the 40th District from 2001 through 2010. Previously he was a member of the Florida House of Representatives from 1985 through 2000. He ran for Mayor of Hialeah, Florida in 2011, but lost.

Florida House of Representatives
Preceded by Robert Reynolds	Member of the Florida House of Representatives from the 109th district 1984–1988	Succeeded by Luis Rojas
Preceded by Nilo Juri	Member of the Florida House of Representatives from the 111th district 1989–1992	Succeeded by Carlos L. Valdes
Preceded by Miguel De Grandy	Member of the Florida House of Representatives from the 110th district 1992–2000	Succeeded by René García
Florida Senate
Preceded by Roberto Casas	Member of the Florida Senate from the 39th district 2000–2002	Succeeded by Larcenia Bullard
Preceded by Daryl Jones	Member of the Florida Senate from the 40th district 2002–2010	Succeeded by René García
