= Florida's 108th House of Representatives district =

Florida district

Florida's 108th State House of Representatives district
Representative
Dotie Joseph; D–North Miami

Florida's 108th House of Representatives district elects one member of the Florida House of Representatives. It contains parts of Miami-Dade County.

== Members ==
- Phillip Brutus (2001–2007)
- Ronald Brisé (2006–2010)
- Daphne Campbell (2010–2016)
- Roy Hardemon (2016–2018)
- Dotie Joseph (since 2018)
