= Phillip Brutus =

American politician (born 1957)

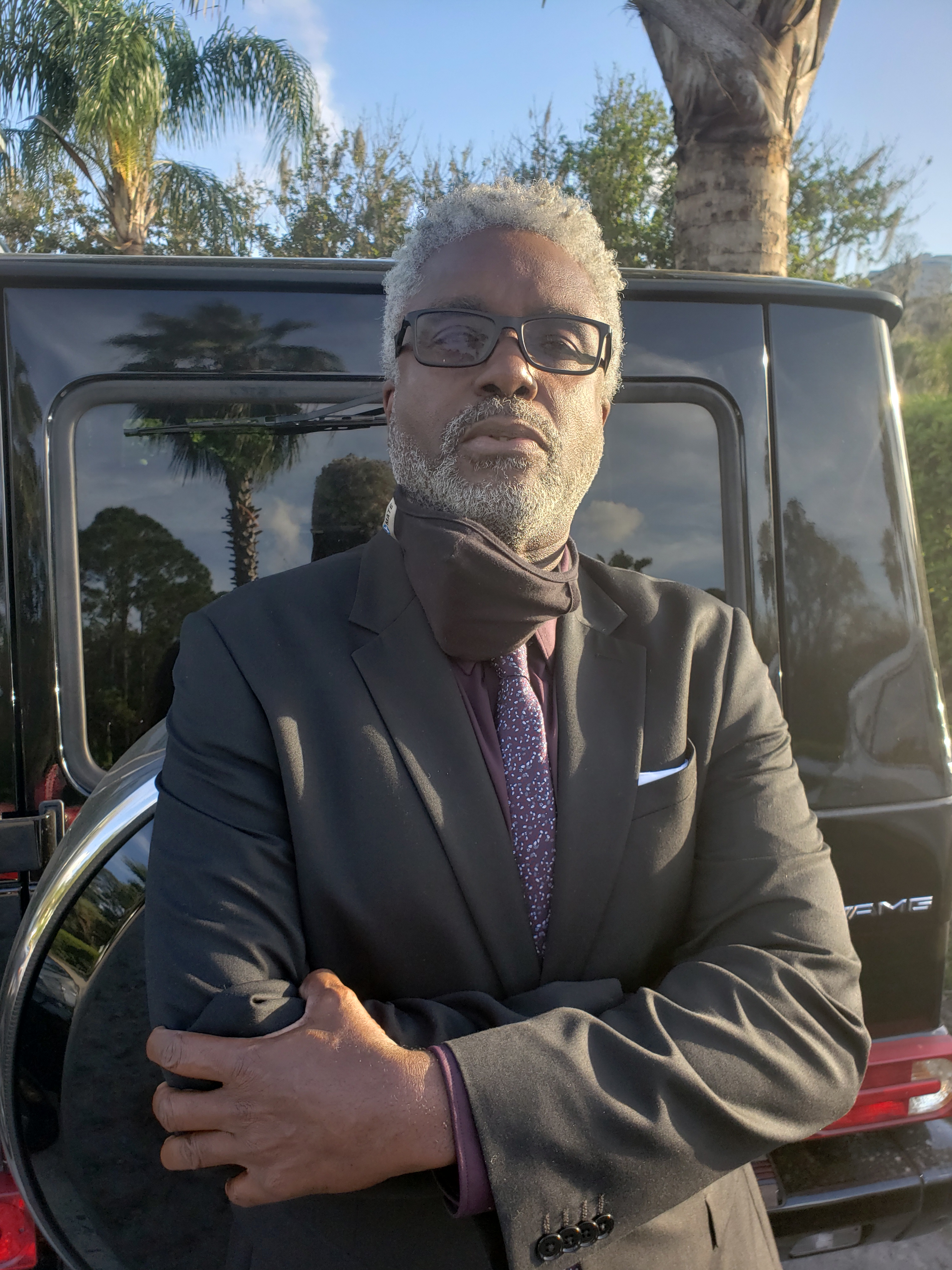

Member of the Florida House of Representatives from the 108th district
- In office 2001–2007

Personal details
- Born: November 26, 1957 (age 68) Port-au-Prince
- Party: Democratic
- Children: Akeem, Malaika, Karami, Julien, and Nia
- Education: University of Massachusetts Boston, B.S., 1982; Suffolk University Law School, J.D., 1985
- Occupation: Attorney

Phillip J. Brutus (born November 26, 1957, in Port-au-Prince) is a former member of the Florida House of Representatives.

Brutus graduated from Erasmus Hall High School in Brooklyn, New York. He received his bachelor's degree at the University of Massachusetts Boston in 1982 and his J.D. degree from Suffolk University Law School in 1985.

Brutus moved to Florida in 1985. Prior to his election to the Florida House, Brutus was a member of the Miami Community Council from the Third District. In 2006, Brutus did not seek reelection.

Brutus had announced in 2009 that he would run for the seat in the United States House of Representatives previously held by Kendrick Meek. Brutus believed that the district needed a leader who understood the community’s needs and was able to implement policies that would advance its priorities. As a law practitioner for 22 years, he has represented clients on issues including immigration, civil rights violation, discrimination and foreclosure defense.

Between 1999 and 2014, Brutus's campaign was 18 times by the Florida Elections Commission (FEC) for missing required FEC filing deadlines. On January 26, 2016, the FEC found Brutus in violation of the Code Of Ethics "by failing to properly disclose his net worth, liabilities, and two real properties." On May 14, 2016, Florida Governor Rick Scott filed an executive order to publicly censure, reprimand and fine Brutus for these violations.

== Early life and family ==
Phillip Brutus was born in Port-au-Prince, Haiti on November 26, 1957. His father, Dr. Paul E. Brutus, was a dental surgeon and professor at the State University Hospital School of Dentistry. An avid linguist, he also taught Spanish and German at the Institute Lope De Vega in Port-au-Prince. From an early age, his uncle Andre Brutus, an attorney, used to take him to Haiti’s Supreme Court to hear oral arguments before that court and to "master Voltaire’s language".

This inspired Brutus to follow in the footsteps of his attorney uncles Pierre Brutus, Andre Brutus and Rene Brutus. Rene ran a private school called Abraham Lincoln Academy. His aunt, Marie Therese Brutus, a high school teacher, taught him Latin, Greek, and French composition. His mother, Marie-Therese Brun, was a kindergarten teacher before venturing into business.

== Education ==
As a child, Brutus attended the Petit Seminaire College St-Martial (Seminaire), a private Catholic school run by the Holy Spirit congregation. Following his aunt Marie-Therese’s emigration to the US with his older sister Margaret, his father secured a student visa and sent him to New York to join his aunt and sister to complete his education, attending college and dental school.

Upon arriving in Brooklyn, New York in the early 1970s, Brutus enrolled at the Erasmus Hall High School. Shortly after his arrival, his aunt decided to return to Haiti and left him with his sister, who was a year older than him. He cites that disruption as the reason he chose not to attend his senior class prom or his high school graduation ceremony in 1976. Because of his immigration status, he was not legally allowed to work and depended on his father for subsistence and his first years of college fees.

After spending two years at the Borough of Manhattan Community College and facing ongoing financial challenges, Brutus moved to Boston, where a large contingent of his maternal family resided. His maternal aunt, Simone Brun-Daphnis, took him in, enabling him to continue his education. There he transferred to the University of Massachusetts at Boston, from which he received a BS degree in 1982.

He then enrolled at the Suffolk University School of Law in Boston. Although his mother’s family provided him with room and board in Boston, he worked as a taxi driver throughout college and law school to cover his school and personal expenses. In 1985, following his graduation from law school, he left for Miami, where one of his cousins had moved a few years earlier.

== See also ==
- United States House of Representatives elections in Florida, 2010#District 17
